= List of Chicago band members =

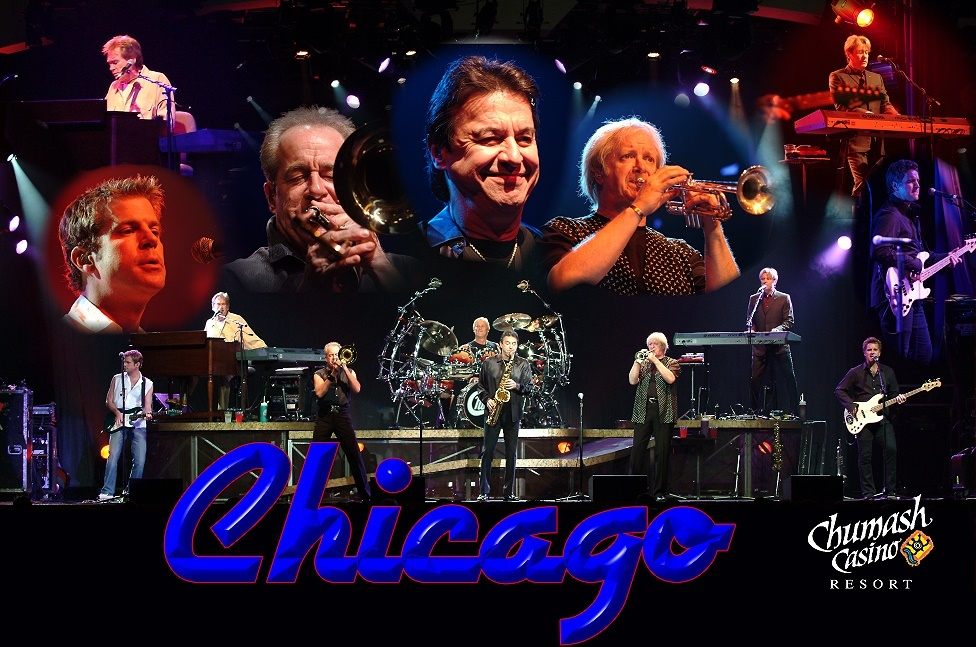
Chicago performing live in 2005.

Chicago is an American rock band from Chicago, Illinois. Formed in February 1967, the group was originally known as The Big Thing and later Chicago Transit Authority, before becoming Chicago in 1969. Initially featuring guitarist and vocalist Terry Kath, keyboardist and vocalist Robert Lamm, drummer Danny Seraphine, saxophonist Walter Parazaider, trumpeter Lee Loughnane and trombonist James Pankow, the band added bassist and vocalist Peter Cetera in December 1967. The group has been through many lineup changes and currently includes Lamm, Loughnane, and Pankow, plus drummer Walfredo Reyes Jr. (since 2012), saxophonist Ray Herrmann (since 2016), percussionist Ramon "Ray" Yslas (since 2018), guitarist Tony Obrohta (since 2021), Eric Baines on bass and vocals (since 2022), Carlos Murguia on keyboards and vocals (since 2025), Justin Avery on keyboards and vocals (since 2026), Rudy Cardenas on lead and back vocals (since 2026) and Nick Lane on trombone and backing vocals (since 2026).

== History ==
=== 1967–2009 ===
Chicago was formed under the name The Big Thing on February 15, 1967, with the original lineup comprising guitarist and vocalist Terry Kath, keyboardist and vocalist Robert Lamm, drummer Danny Seraphine, saxophonist Walter Parazaider, trumpeter Lee Loughnane and trombonist James Pankow. In December, bassist Peter Cetera was added to the band, which was soon renamed Chicago Transit Authority. After the release of a self-titled debut album in April 1969, the band shortened its name to simply Chicago after receiving a threat of legal action from the Chicago Transit Authority. The group's lineup remained stable for over ten years and released a series commercially and critically successful albums. In 1974, percussionist Laudir de Oliveira was added as an eighth member of the band after contributing to Chicago VI and VII as a guest musician. On January 23, 1978, however, the band suffered its first personnel loss when Kath accidentally killed himself with a gunshot to the head.

The band briefly considered breaking up after Kath's death, but ultimately chose to continue and added Donnie Dacus as his replacement in April 1978. After just two albums, Dacus was dismissed from Chicago in February 1980. He was replaced by Chris Pinnick, who was initially credited as an additional contributor but later upgraded to a full band member. After the release of Chicago XIV, the band was complemented on tour by Marty Grebb on saxophone, guitar and keyboards. At the end of the album's touring cycle, de Oliveira left Chicago. In late 1981, after being dropped by Columbia Records, the band started working with David Foster as its new producer, who introduced keyboardist, guitarist and vocalist Bill Champlin to the lineup. Cetera's brother, Kenny, performed background vocals on Chicago 17, and was also added as a touring percussionist and background singer after its release in 1984. Despite renewed commercial success for the group, Cetera left Chicago in July 1985 to focus on his solo career. Pinnick left around the same time.

Cetera was replaced in September 1985 by Jason Scheff, son of former Elvis Presley bassist Jerry Scheff. Pinnick was not replaced until the following July, when former Bob Seger's Silver Bullet Band guitarist Dawayne Bailey joined the group. Chicago lost another founding member in May 1990, when Seraphine was fired and replaced by Tris Imboden. After voicing his frustration with the cancellation of Stone of Sisyphus in 1994, Bailey's contract was not renewed and he was dismissed from the band. Bruce Gaitsch initially filled in on guitar, including the recording of 1995's Night & Day: Big Band, before Keith Howland was hired as Bailey's replacement in January 1995. Chicago's lineup remained stable throughout the rest of the 1990s and the 2000s, save for the addition of several touring substitutes at various times, including trombonist Nick Lane in place of Pankow, saxophonist Larry Klimas in place of Parazaider, and trumpeter Lee Thornburg in place of Loughnane.

=== 2009–present ===
In 2009, after substituting for Imboden on drums at a number of shows, Drew Hester joined Chicago on percussion. Shortly thereafter, Champlin left Chicago after 28 years with the band, reportedly to focus on his solo career. He was replaced on keyboards and vocals by Lou Pardini. Champlin later claimed that he was fired, rather than having left of his own choosing. Hester left in May 2012 to return to focus on drumming. His place was initially taken briefly by Daniel de los Reyes, before his brother Walfredo Reyes Jr. took over more permanently when the former committed full-time to the Zac Brown Band instead. In October 2016, Scheff also left the band after a five-month leave of absence due to "family health issues", with his replacement Jeff Coffey taking over on a permanent basis. The following year, Parazaider retired from touring due to a heart condition, with Ray Herrmann taking his place as an official band member.

Chicago experienced two lineup changes in January 2018. First Imboden announced on January 17 that he was leaving to spend more time with his new wife, then two days later Coffey followed due to the band's heavy touring schedule. Reyes subsequently switched from percussion to take over Imboden's role on drums, while Coffey was replaced by vocalist Neil Donell and bassist Brett Simons. Daniel de los Reyes filled in on percussion again when the band returned to touring, before Ramon "Ray" Yslas took over on a permanent basis. On November 15, 2021, Howland took a leave from the group after breaking his arm in an accident, with guitarist Tony Obrohta substituting for him at concerts. On December 1, 2021, Howland announced he was leaving Chicago after over 26 years, citing the recent accident and lengthy recovery period as bringing about the next phase of his life. Tony Obrohta joined the group to replace Howland in December 2021. On January 21, 2022, Lou Pardini announced his departure from the band. Loren Gold, who had substituted for Pardini in August and September 2021, began appearing with the group on vocals and keyboards for tour dates starting in January 2022. Gold officially joined the band on keyboards and vocals in March 2022. On Friday, May 6, 2022, Chicago announced on their website that Brett Simons had departed the band and Eric Baines (bass, vocals) had joined the group. On March 2, 2025, Carlos Murguia joined the band on keyboards and vocals. In February 2026, Loren Gold departed the band, and was replaced by Justin Avery on keyboards and vocals. In June 2026, Neil Donell was replaced by Rudy Cardenas as tenor vocalist, and Nick Lane officially became a group member on trombone.

== Band members ==
=== Current ===
Image	Name	Years active	Instruments	Release contributions
	Robert Lamm	1967–present (retired from touring since 2025)	keyboards; piano; lead and backing vocals; bass pedals (1967) (plus occasional bass, acoustic guitar and percussion)	all Chicago releases to date
	Lee Loughnane	1967–present	trumpet; flugelhorn; backing and occasional lead vocals (plus occasional keyboards, acoustic and rhythm guitars, and percussion)	all Chicago releases to date
	James Pankow	1967–present (retired from touring since 2025)	trombone; backing and occasional lead vocals (plus occasional percussion and keyboards)	all Chicago releases to date
	Walfredo Reyes Jr.	2012–present	drums (2018–present); percussion (2012–2018)	all Chicago releases from Chicago XXXVI: Now (2014) onwards, except VI Decades Live: This Is What We Do (2018)
	Ray Herrmann	2016–present (Note: Herrmann also featured as a touring substitute for Walter Parazaider at various points between 2005 and 2016.)	saxophones; flute; clarinet; backing vocals	Chicago XXXVI: Now (2014) (as a session musician); Chicago II Live on Soundstage (2018); Greatest Hits Live (2018); Chicago XXXVII: Chicago Christmas (2019); Chicago XXXVIII: Born for This Moment (2022)
	Ramon "Ray" Yslas	2018–present	percussion; congas	Chicago XXXVII: Chicago Christmas (2019); Chicago XXXVIII (2022)
	Tony Obrohta	2021–present (Note: Obrohta was initially a touring substitute for Keith Howland between November and December 2021.)	lead guitar; backing vocals	none to date
	Eric Baines	2022–present	bass; lead and backing vocals	none to date
	Carlos Murguia	2025–present (Note: Murguia was also a touring substitute for Loren Gold during 2023 and Robert Lamm during 2024.)	keyboards; lead and backing vocals	none to date
	Justin Avery	2026–present	keyboards; lead and backing vocals	none to date
	Rudy Cardenas	2026–present	lead and backing vocals	none to date
	Nick Lane	2026–present (Note: Lane was also a touring substitute for James Pankow on various occasions from 1999 to 2026.)	trombone; backing vocals	none to date

=== Former ===
Image	Name	Years active	Instruments	Release contributions
	Walter Parazaider	1967–2018 (retired from touring since 2017; died 2026)	saxophones; flute; clarinet; backing vocals (plus occasional percussion)	all Chicago releases from Chicago Transit Authority (1969) to VI Decades Live: This Is What We Do (2018)
	Danny Seraphine	1967–1990	drums; percussion (plus occasional backing vocals)	all Chicago releases from Chicago Transit Authority (1969) to Chicago 19 (1988); Chicago XXXIV: Live in '75 (2011); VI Decades Live: This Is What We Do (2018)
	Terry Kath	1967–1978 (until his death)	lead guitar; lead and backing vocals (plus occasional bass and percussion)	all Chicago releases from Chicago Transit Authority (1969) to Chicago XI (1977); Chicago XXXIV: Live in '75 (2011); VI Decades Live: This Is What We Do (2018)
	Peter Cetera	1967–1985	bass; lead and backing vocals (plus occasional guitar)	all Chicago releases from Chicago Transit Authority (1969) to Chicago 17 (1984); Chicago XXXIV: Live in '75 (2011); VI Decades Live: This Is What We Do (2018)
	Laudir de Oliveira	1974–1981 (session musician 1973–74; died 2017)	percussion; congas (plus occasional backing vocals)	Chicago VI (1973) and Chicago VII (1974) (as a session musician); all releases from Chicago VIII to Chicago XIV (1980); Chicago XXXIV: Live in '75 (2011)
	Donnie Dacus	1978–1980	lead guitar; lead and backing vocals	Hot Streets (1978); Chicago 13 (1979)
	Chris Pinnick	1980–1985 (session musician 1980)	lead guitar	Chicago XIV (1980); Chicago 16 (1982); Chicago 17 (1984)
	Bill Champlin	1981–2009	keyboards; rhythm guitar; lead and backing vocals (plus occasional piano)	all Chicago releases from Chicago 16 (1982) to Chicago XXXII: Stone of Sisyphus (2008); VI Decades Live: This Is What We Do (2018)
	Jason Scheff	1985–2016	bass; lead and backing vocals (plus occasional keyboards and guitar)	all Chicago releases from Chicago 18 (1986) to Chicago at Symphony Hall (2015), except Chicago XXXIV: Live in '75 (2011); VI Decades Live: This Is What We Do
	Dawayne Bailey	1986–1994	lead guitar; backing and occasional lead vocals	Chicago 19 (1988); Twenty 1 (1991); Chicago XXXII: Stone of Sisyphus (2008); VI Decades Live: This Is What We Do
	Tris Imboden	1990–2018	drums; percussion (plus occasional harmonica)	all Chicago releases from Twenty 1 (1991) to Greatest Hits Live (2018), except Chicago XXXIV: Live in '75 (2011) and VI Decades Live: This Is What We Do (2018)
	Bruce Gaitsch	1994–1995	lead guitar	Night & Day: Big Band (1995); Chicago XXXII: Stone of Sisyphus (2008) (as a session musician); Chicago XXXVIII: Born for This Moment (2022) (as a session musician)
	Keith Howland	1995–2021	lead guitar; backing and occasional lead vocals (plus occasional keyboards)	all Chicago releases from The Heart of Chicago 1967–1997 (1997) to Chicago XXXVIII: Born For This Moment (2022)
	Drew Hester	2009–2012 (touring substitute in early 2009)	percussion; drums (early 2009 touring substitute)	Chicago XXXIII: O Christmas Three (2011)
	Lou Pardini	2009–2022 (touring substitute in 1999 and 2007)	keyboards; lead and backing vocals	all releases from Chicago XXXIII: O Christmas Three (2011) to Chicago XXXVIII: Born For This Moment (2022)
	Daniel de los Reyes	2012; 2018	percussion	none – live performances only
	Jeff Coffey	2016–2018 (touring substitute in early 2016)	bass; lead and backing vocals (plus occasional acoustic guitar)	Chicago II Live on Soundstage (2018); Greatest Hits Live (2018)
	Neil Donell	2018–2026	lead and backing vocals; acoustic guitar	Chicago XXXVII: Chicago Christmas (2019); Chicago XXXVIII (2022)
	Brett Simons	2018–2022	bass; backing vocals	Chicago XXXVII: Chicago Christmas (2019); Chicago XXXVIII (2022)
	Loren Gold	2022–2026 (Note: Gold was also a touring substitute for Lou Pardini between August and September 2021, then a touring member between January and March 2022.)	keyboards; backing and occasional lead vocals	

=== Touring musicians ===
Image	Name	Years active	Instruments	Release contributions and comments
	Marty Grebb	1980–1981 (died 2020)	saxophones; guitar; keyboards; backing vocals	none – live performances only; Grebb joined Chicago on tour for the promotional cycle following the release of Chicago XIV in 1980.
	Kenny Cetera	1984–1985	percussion; keyboards; backing vocals	Chicago 17 – backing vocals; Peter Cetera's brother Kenny also toured with Chicago after the release of Chicago 17, before both left.

=== Touring substitutes ===
Image	Name	Years active	Instruments	Release contributions and comments
	Steve Jankowski	1992; 2006; 2026	trumpet	Jankowski and Thornburg have both substituted for Lee Loughnane on various occasions.
	Lee Thornburg	1992; 2008; 2009; 2012	trumpet	Jankowski and Thornburg have both substituted for Lee Loughnane on various occasions.
	Tom Timko	1992; 2005	saxophones; flute	Timko substituted for Walter Parazaider during the summer of 1992 and again in the summer of 2005.
	Larry Klimas	2003–present	saxophones; flute	Klimas has been a regular substitute for Walter Parazaider and Ray Herrmann since 2003.
	Rob Arthur	2022–2023	keyboards; vocals	Arthur substituted for Loren Gold in 2022.

== Timelines ==
=== Recording ===
Album	Guitar	Bass	Keyboards	Drums	Saxophone, flute, clarinet	Trumpet	Trombone	Percussion	Lead vocals
Chicago Transit Authority (1969)	Terry Kath	Peter Cetera	Robert Lamm	Danny Seraphine	Walter Parazaider	Lee Loughnane	James Pankow	none	Peter Cetera; Terry Kath; Robert Lamm
Chicago (1970)	Terry Kath	Peter Cetera	Robert Lamm	Danny Seraphine	Walter Parazaider	Lee Loughnane	James Pankow	none	Peter Cetera; Terry Kath; Robert Lamm
Chicago III (1971)	Terry Kath	Peter Cetera	Robert Lamm	Danny Seraphine	Walter Parazaider	Lee Loughnane	James Pankow	none	Peter Cetera; Terry Kath; Robert Lamm
Chicago V (1972)	Terry Kath	Peter Cetera	Robert Lamm	Danny Seraphine	Walter Parazaider	Lee Loughnane	James Pankow	none	Peter Cetera; Terry Kath; Robert Lamm
Chicago VI (1973)	Terry Kath	Peter Cetera	Robert Lamm	Danny Seraphine	Walter Parazaider	Lee Loughnane	James Pankow	Laudir de Oliveira (session musician)	Peter Cetera; Terry Kath; Robert Lamm
Chicago VII (1974)	Terry Kath	Peter Cetera	Robert Lamm	Danny Seraphine	Walter Parazaider	Lee Loughnane	James Pankow	Laudir de Oliveira (session musician)	Peter Cetera; Terry Kath; Robert Lamm
Chicago VIII (1975)	Terry Kath	Peter Cetera	Robert Lamm	Danny Seraphine	Walter Parazaider	Lee Loughnane	James Pankow	Laudir de Oliveira	Peter Cetera; Terry Kath; Robert Lamm
Chicago X (1976)	Terry Kath	Peter Cetera	Robert Lamm	Danny Seraphine	Walter Parazaider	Lee Loughnane	James Pankow	Laudir de Oliveira	Peter Cetera; Terry Kath; Robert Lamm
Chicago XI (1977)	Terry Kath	Peter Cetera	Robert Lamm	Danny Seraphine	Walter Parazaider	Lee Loughnane	James Pankow	Laudir de Oliveira	Peter Cetera; Terry Kath; Robert Lamm
Hot Streets (1978)	Donnie Dacus	Peter Cetera	Robert Lamm	Danny Seraphine	Walter Parazaider	Lee Loughnane	James Pankow	Laudir de Oliveira	Peter Cetera; Robert Lamm; Donnie Dacus
Chicago 13 (1979)	Donnie Dacus	Peter Cetera	Robert Lamm	Danny Seraphine	Walter Parazaider	Lee Loughnane	James Pankow	Laudir de Oliveira	Peter Cetera; Robert Lamm; Donnie Dacus
Chicago XIV (1980)	Chris Pinnick	Peter Cetera	Robert Lamm	Danny Seraphine	Walter Parazaider	Lee Loughnane	James Pankow	Laudir de Oliveira	Peter Cetera; Robert Lamm
Chicago 16 (1982)	Chris Pinnick	Peter Cetera	Robert Lamm; Bill Champlin	Danny Seraphine	Walter Parazaider	Lee Loughnane	James Pankow	none	Peter Cetera; Robert Lamm; Bill Champlin
Chicago 17 (1984)	Chris Pinnick	Peter Cetera	Robert Lamm; Bill Champlin	Danny Seraphine	Walter Parazaider	Lee Loughnane	James Pankow	none	Peter Cetera; Robert Lamm; Bill Champlin
Chicago 18 (1986)	session musicians	Jason Scheff	Robert Lamm; Bill Champlin	Danny Seraphine	Walter Parazaider	Lee Loughnane	James Pankow	none	Robert Lamm; Bill Champlin; Jason Scheff
Chicago 19 (1988)	Dawayne Bailey	Jason Scheff	Robert Lamm; Bill Champlin	Danny Seraphine	Walter Parazaider	Lee Loughnane	James Pankow	none	Robert Lamm; Bill Champlin; Jason Scheff
Twenty 1 (1991)	Dawayne Bailey	Jason Scheff	Robert Lamm; Bill Champlin	Tris Imboden	Walter Parazaider	Lee Loughnane	James Pankow	none	Robert Lamm; Bill Champlin; Jason Scheff
Chicago XXXII (2008)	Dawayne Bailey	Jason Scheff	Robert Lamm; Bill Champlin	Tris Imboden	Walter Parazaider	Lee Loughnane	James Pankow	none	Robert Lamm; Bill Champlin; Jason Scheff
Night & Day: Big Band (1995)	Bruce Gaitsch	Jason Scheff	Robert Lamm; Bill Champlin	Tris Imboden	Walter Parazaider	Lee Loughnane	James Pankow	Luis Conte (session musician)	Robert Lamm; Bill Champlin; Jason Scheff
Chicago XXV (1998)	Keith Howland	Jason Scheff	Robert Lamm; Bill Champlin	Tris Imboden	Walter Parazaider	Lee Loughnane	James Pankow	Luis Conte (session musician)	Robert Lamm; Bill Champlin; Jason Scheff
Chicago XXX (2006)	Keith Howland	Jason Scheff	Robert Lamm; Bill Champlin	Tris Imboden	Walter Parazaider	Lee Loughnane	James Pankow	none	Robert Lamm; Bill Champlin; Jason Scheff
Chicago XXXV (2013)	Keith Howland	Jason Scheff	Robert Lamm; Bill Champlin	Tris Imboden	Walter Parazaider	Lee Loughnane	James Pankow	none	Robert Lamm; Jason Scheff
Chicago XXXIII (2011)	Keith Howland	Jason Scheff	Robert Lamm; Lou Pardini	Tris Imboden	Walter Parazaider	Lee Loughnane	James Pankow	Drew Hester	Robert Lamm; Jason Scheff; Lou Pardini
Chicago XXXVI (2014)	Keith Howland	Jason Scheff	Robert Lamm; Lou Pardini	Tris Imboden	Walter Parazaider	Lee Loughnane	James Pankow	Walfredo Reyes Jr.	Robert Lamm; Jason Scheff; Lou Pardini
Chicago XXXVII (2019)	Keith Howland	Brett Simons	Robert Lamm; Lou Pardini	Walfredo Reyes Jr.	Ray Herrmann	Lee Loughnane	James Pankow	Ramon Yslas	Robert Lamm; Lou Pardini; Neil Donell
Chicago XXXVIII: Born For This Moment (2022)	Keith Howland	Brett Simons	Robert Lamm; Lou Pardini	Walfredo Reyes Jr.	Ray Herrmann	Lee Loughnane	James Pankow	Ramon Yslas	Robert Lamm; Neil Donell

== Lineups ==
Period	Members	Releases
February – December 1967 (as The Big Thing)	Robert Lamm – keyboards, vocals; Terry Kath – guitar, vocals; Danny Seraphine – drums, percussion; Walter Parazaider – woodwinds, backing vocals; Lee Loughnane – trumpet, backing vocals; James Pankow – trombone, backing vocals	none
December 1967 – June 1968 (as The Big Thing)	Robert Lamm – keyboards, vocals; Terry Kath – guitar, vocals; Peter Cetera – bass, vocals; Danny Seraphine – drums, percussion; Walter Parazaider – woodwinds, backing vocals; Lee Loughnane – trumpet, backing vocals; James Pankow – trombone, backing vocals	none
June 1968 – mid-1969 (as Chicago Transit Authority)	Robert Lamm – keyboards, vocals; Terry Kath – guitar, vocals; Peter Cetera – bass, vocals; Danny Seraphine – drums, percussion; Walter Parazaider – woodwinds, backing vocals; Lee Loughnane – trumpet, backing vocals; James Pankow – trombone, backing vocals	Chicago Transit Authority (1969)
Mid-1969 – early-1974	Robert Lamm – keyboards, vocals; Terry Kath – guitar, vocals; Peter Cetera – bass, vocals; Danny Seraphine – drums, percussion; Walter Parazaider – woodwinds, backing vocals; Lee Loughnane – trumpet, backing vocals; James Pankow – trombone, backing vocals; Touring musicians: Laudir de Oliveira – percussion (1973–1974)	Chicago (1970); Chicago III (1971); Chicago at Carnegie Hall (1971); Chicago V (1972); Chicago VI (1973); Chicago VII (1974)
Mid-1974 – January 1978	Robert Lamm – keyboards, vocals; Terry Kath – guitar, vocals; Peter Cetera – bass, vocals; Danny Seraphine – drums; Walter Parazaider – woodwinds, backing vocals; Lee Loughnane – trumpet, backing vocals; James Pankow – trombone, backing vocals; Laudir de Oliveira – percussion, congas	Chicago VIII (1975); Chicago X (1976); Chicago XI (1977); Chicago XXXIV: Live in '75 (2011)
April 1978 – February 1980	Robert Lamm – keyboards, vocals; Peter Cetera – bass, vocals; Donnie Dacus – guitar, vocals; Danny Seraphine – drums; Walter Parazaider – woodwinds, backing vocals; Lee Loughnane – trumpet, backing vocals; James Pankow – trombone, backing vocals; Laudir de Oliveira – percussion	Hot Streets (1978); Chicago 13 (1979)
February 1980 – late 1981	Robert Lamm – keyboards, vocals; Peter Cetera – bass, vocals; Danny Seraphine – drums; Walter Parazaider – woodwinds, backing vocals; Lee Loughnane – trumpet, backing vocals; James Pankow – trombone, backing vocals; Laudir de Oliveira – percussion; Chris Pinnick – lead guitar; Touring musicians: Marty Grebb – saxophone, guitar, keyboards, backing vocals (1980–1981)	Chicago XIV (1980)
Late 1981 – July 1985	Robert Lamm – keyboards, vocals; Peter Cetera – bass, vocals; Bill Champlin – keyboards, guitar, vocals; Danny Seraphine – drums; Walter Parazaider – woodwinds, backing vocals; Lee Loughnane – trumpet, backing vocals; James Pankow – trombone, backing vocals; Chris Pinnick – lead guitar; Touring musicians: Kenny Cetera – percussion, keyboards, backing vocals (1984–1985)	Chicago 16 (1982); Chicago 17 (1984)
September 1985 – July 1986	Robert Lamm – keyboards, vocals; Bill Champlin – keyboards, guitar, vocals; Jason Scheff – bass, vocals; Danny Seraphine – drums; Walter Parazaider – woodwinds, backing vocals; Lee Loughnane – trumpet, backing vocals; James Pankow – trombone, backing vocals	Chicago 18 (1986)
July 1986 – May 1990	Robert Lamm – keyboards, vocals; Bill Champlin – keyboards, guitar, vocals; Jason Scheff – bass, vocals; Dawayne Bailey – lead guitar, backing vocals; Danny Seraphine – drums; Walter Parazaider – woodwinds, backing vocals; Lee Loughnane – trumpet, backing vocals; James Pankow – trombone, backing vocals	Chicago 19 (1988)
May 1990 – late 1994	Robert Lamm – keyboards, vocals; Bill Champlin – keyboards, guitar, vocals; Jason Scheff – bass, vocals; Dawayne Bailey – lead guitar, backing vocals; Tris Imboden – drums, percussion, harmonica; Walter Parazaider – woodwinds, backing vocals; Lee Loughnane – trumpet, backing vocals; James Pankow – trombone, backing vocals	Twenty 1 (1991); Chicago XXXII: Stone of Sisyphus (2008)
December 1994 – January 1995	Robert Lamm – keyboards, vocals; Bill Champlin – keyboards, guitar, vocals; Jason Scheff – bass, vocals; Bruce Gaitsch – lead guitar; Tris Imboden – drums, percussion, harmonica; Walter Parazaider – woodwinds, backing vocals; Lee Loughnane – trumpet, backing vocals; James Pankow – trombone, backing vocals	Night & Day: Big Band (1995)
January 1995 – mid-2009	Robert Lamm – keyboards, vocals; Bill Champlin – keyboards, guitar, vocals; Jason Scheff – bass, vocals; Keith Howland – lead guitar, backing vocals; Tris Imboden – drums, percussion, harmonica; Walter Parazaider – woodwinds, backing vocals; Lee Loughnane – trumpet, backing vocals; James Pankow – trombone, backing vocals	Chicago XXV: The Christmas Album (1998); Chicago XXVI: Live in Concert (1999); A&E Network: Live by Request (2002); Soundstage Presents Chicago: Live in Concert... (2003); Live at the Greek Theatre (2004); Chicago XXX (2006); Chicago XXXV: The Nashville Sessions (2013)
Mid-2009	Robert Lamm – keyboards, vocals; Bill Champlin – keyboards, guitar, vocals; Jason Scheff – bass, vocals; Keith Howland – lead guitar, backing vocals; Tris Imboden – drums, harmonica; Drew Hester – percussion; Walter Parazaider – woodwinds, backing vocals; Lee Loughnane – trumpet, backing vocals; James Pankow – trombone, backing vocals	none
August 2009 – May 2012	Robert Lamm – keyboards, vocals; Jason Scheff – bass, vocals; Lou Pardini – keyboards, vocals; Keith Howland – guitar, backing vocals; Tris Imboden – drums, harmonica; Drew Hester – percussion; Walter Parazaider – woodwinds, backing vocals; Lee Loughnane – trumpet, backing vocals; James Pankow – trombone, backing vocals	Chicago XXXIII: O Christmas Three (2011)
May 2012	Robert Lamm – keyboards, vocals; Jason Scheff – bass, vocals; Lou Pardini – keyboards, vocals; Keith Howland – guitar, backing vocals; Tris Imboden – drums, harmonica; Daniel de los Reyes – percussion; Walter Parazaider – woodwinds, backing vocals; Lee Loughnane – trumpet, backing vocals; James Pankow – trombone, backing vocals	none
May 2012 – October 2016	Robert Lamm – keyboards, vocals; Jason Scheff – bass, vocals; Lou Pardini – keyboards, vocals; Keith Howland – guitar, backing vocals; Tris Imboden – drums, harmonica; Walfredo Reyes Jr. – percussion; Walter Parazaider – woodwinds, backing vocals; Lee Loughnane – trumpet, backing vocals; James Pankow – trombone, backing vocals	Chicago XXXVI: Now (2014); Chicago at Symphony Hall (2015)
October 2016 – June 2017	Robert Lamm – keyboards, vocals; Lou Pardini – keyboards, vocals; Jeff Coffey – bass, vocals; Keith Howland – guitar, backing vocals; Tris Imboden – drums, harmonica; Walfredo Reyes Jr. – percussion; Walter Parazaider – woodwinds, backing vocals; Lee Loughnane – trumpet, backing vocals; James Pankow – trombone, backing vocals	none
June 2017 – January 2018	Robert Lamm – keyboards, vocals; Lou Pardini – keyboards, vocals; Jeff Coffey – bass, vocals; Keith Howland – guitar, backing vocals; Tris Imboden – drums, harmonica; Walfredo Reyes Jr. – percussion; Ray Herrmann – woodwinds, backing vocals; Lee Loughnane – trumpet, backing vocals; James Pankow – trombone, backing vocals	Chicago II Live on Soundstage (2018); Greatest Hits Live (2018)
January – May 2018	Robert Lamm – keyboards, vocals; Lou Pardini – keyboards, vocals; Neil Donell – vocals, acoustic guitar; Keith Howland – lead guitar, backing vocals; Brett Simons – bass, backing vocals; Walfredo Reyes Jr. – drums; Daniel de los Reyes – percussion; Ray Herrmann – woodwinds, backing vocals; Lee Loughnane – trumpet, backing vocals; James Pankow – trombone, backing vocals	none
May 2018 – December 2021	Robert Lamm – keyboards, vocals; Lou Pardini – keyboards, vocals; Neil Donell – vocals, acoustic guitar; Keith Howland – lead guitar, backing vocals; Brett Simons – bass, backing vocals; Walfredo Reyes Jr. – drums; Ramon "Ray" Yslas – percussion; Ray Herrmann – woodwinds, backing vocals; Lee Loughnane – trumpet, backing vocals; James Pankow – trombone, backing vocals	Chicago XXXVII: Chicago Christmas (2019); Chicago XXXVIII: Born For This Moment (2022)
December 2021 - January 2022	Robert Lamm – keyboards, vocals; Lou Pardini – keyboards, vocals; Neil Donell – vocals, acoustic guitar; Brett Simons – bass, backing vocals; Walfredo Reyes Jr. – drums; Ramon "Ray" Yslas – percussion; Ray Herrmann – woodwinds, backing vocals; Lee Loughnane – trumpet, backing vocals; James Pankow – trombone, backing vocals; Tony Obrohta - lead guitar, backing vocals	none
January – March 2022	Robert Lamm – keyboards, vocals; Neil Donell – vocals, acoustic guitar; Brett Simons – bass, backing vocals; Walfredo Reyes Jr. – drums; Ramon "Ray" Yslas – percussion; Ray Herrmann – woodwinds, backing vocals; Lee Loughnane – trumpet, backing vocals; James Pankow – trombone, backing vocals; Tony Obrohta - lead guitar, backing vocals; Touring musicians: Loren Gold – keyboards, backing vocals (2022)	none
March – April 2022	Robert Lamm – keyboards, vocals; Neil Donell – vocals, acoustic guitar; Brett Simons – bass, backing vocals; Walfredo Reyes Jr. – drums; Ramon "Ray" Yslas – percussion; Ray Herrmann – woodwinds, backing vocals; Lee Loughnane – trumpet, backing vocals; James Pankow – trombone, backing vocals; Tony Obrohta - lead guitar, backing vocals; Loren Gold – keyboards, vocals	none
May 2022 – March 2025	Robert Lamm – keyboards, vocals; Neil Donell – vocals, acoustic guitar; Walfredo Reyes Jr. – drums; Ramon "Ray" Yslas – percussion; Ray Herrmann – woodwinds, backing vocals; Lee Loughnane – trumpet, backing vocals; James Pankow – trombone, backing vocals; Tony Obrohta – lead guitar, backing vocals; Loren Gold – keyboards, vocals; Eric Baines – bass, vocals	none
March 2025 – February 2026	Robert Lamm – keyboards, vocals (not touring); Neil Donell – vocals, acoustic guitar; Walfredo Reyes Jr. – drums; Ramon "Ray" Yslas – percussion; Ray Herrmann – woodwinds, backing vocals; Lee Loughnane – trumpet, backing vocals; James Pankow – trombone, backing vocals (not touring); Tony Obrohta – lead guitar, backing vocals; Loren Gold – keyboards, vocals; Eric Baines – bass, vocals; Carlos Murguia - keyboards, vocals	none
February 2026 – May 2026	Robert Lamm – keyboards, vocals (not touring); Neil Donell – vocals, acoustic guitar; Walfredo Reyes Jr. – drums; Ramon "Ray" Yslas – percussion; Ray Herrmann – woodwinds, backing vocals; Lee Loughnane – trumpet, backing vocals; James Pankow – trombone, backing vocals (not touring); Tony Obrohta – lead guitar, backing vocals; Eric Baines – bass, vocals; Carlos Murguia - keyboards, vocals; Justin Avery – keyboards, vocals	none
June 2026 – present	Robert Lamm – keyboards, vocals (not touring); Walfredo Reyes Jr. – drums; Ramon "Ray" Yslas – percussion; Ray Herrmann – woodwinds, backing vocals; Lee Loughnane – trumpet, backing vocals; James Pankow – trombone, backing vocals (not touring); Tony Obrohta – lead guitar, backing vocals; Eric Baines – bass, vocals; Carlos Murguia - keyboards, vocals; Justin Avery – keyboards, vocals; Rudy Cardenas – vocals; Nick Lane – trombone, backing vocals	none
