= Chicago XXXV: The Nashville Sessions =

Studio album by Chicago
- Released: April 26, 2013
- Recorded: January 2009
- Genre: Rock
- Length: 55:47
- Label: Chicago Records II
- Producer: Chicago

Chicago chronology
Chicago XXXIV: Live in '75 (2011)	Chicago XXXV: The Nashville Sessions (2013)	Chicago XXXVI: Now (2014)

Chicago XXXV: The Nashville Sessions is the twenty-third studio album, and thirty-fifth overall album by the band Chicago, released in 2013. Recorded at The Sound Kitchen between tour stops, The Nashville Sessions is a collection of new recordings of songs from the band's back catalogue.

== Track listing ==
No.	Title	Writer(s)	Original album	Length
1.	"25 or 6 to 4"	Robert Lamm	Chicago, 1970	4:51
2.	"Make Me Smile"	James Pankow	Chicago	2:57
3.	"Feelin' Stronger Every Day"	Peter Cetera; Pankow	Chicago VI, 1973	4:06
4.	"Beginnings"	Lamm	Chicago Transit Authority, 1969	2:44
5.	"Saturday in the Park"	Lamm	Chicago V, 1972	3:54
6.	"Colour My World"	Pankow	Chicago	2:59
7.	"Does Anybody Really Know What Time It Is?"	Lamm	Chicago Transit Authority	3:22
8.	"Questions 67 and 68"	Lamm	Chicago Transit Authority	4:46
9.	"Old Days"	Pankow	Chicago VIII, 1975	3:21
10.	"Just You 'n' Me"	Pankow	Chicago VI	3:42
11.	"Call on Me"	Lee Loughnane	Chicago VII, 1974	3:56
12.	"Another Rainy Day in New York City"	Lamm	Chicago X, 1976	2:55
13.	"No Tell Lover"	Loughnane; Danny Seraphine; Cetera	Hot Streets, 1978	3:44
14.	"(I've Been) Searchin' So Long"	Pankow	Chicago VII	4:31
15.	"Alive Again"	Pankow	Hot Streets	3:51
Total length:				55:47

== Personnel ==
Adapted from the album liner notes.

=== Chicago ===
- Robert Lamm – keyboards, lead and backing vocals
- Lee Loughnane – trumpet, lead vocals on "Make Me Smile" and "Colour My World"
- James Pankow – trombone
- Walter Parazaider – woodwinds
- Jason Scheff – bass, lead and backing vocals
- Tris Imboden – drums, percussion
- Keith Howland – guitar, lead and backing vocals

=== Production ===
- Kevin Beamish – recording and mix engineer
- Matt Coles – overdub engineer
- Adam Deane – overdub engineer
- Keith Howland – overdub engineer
- Jason Scheff – overdub engineer
