= Beachago =

1975 concert tour by The Beach Boys and Chicago

- Tour by The Beach Boys and Chicago
- Poster to the concert in Anaheim, California
- Location: United States
- Album recording: Chicago XXXIV: Live in '75
- Start date: May 2, 1975
- End date: July 6, 1975
- Legs: 1
- No. of shows: 27
- Box office: $7.5 million (equivalent to $44.9 million in 2025)

In 1975, the American rock bands The Beach Boys and Chicago co-headlined a concert tour that was popularly known as "Beachago". The tour began on May 2 and ended on July 6, with the two bands performing 27 shows at several venues throughout the United States. The tour was developed by James William Guercio, who worked as a talent manager for the two bands. The shows consisted of three sections, with both bands performing largely independently before a finale that involved both bands playing together. The tour was a commercial success, attracting a total of about 700,000 attendees and grossing about $7.5 million (equivalent to $44.9 million in 2025). Contemporary reviews were generally positive towards The Beach Boys' performances and more mixed towards Chicago's, and the tour coincided with a resurgence in popularity for the former. The two bands later toured together again in 1989 and 2022, while a live album of Chicago's performance at one of the shows was released in 2011 as Chicago XXXIV: Live in '75.

== Background and development ==
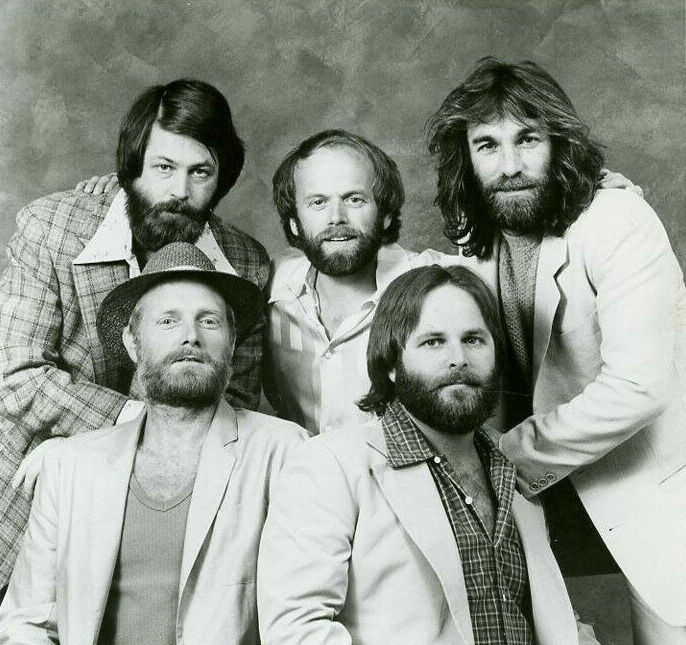
The Beach Boys in 1979 (Note: From left to right: Brian Wilson, Mike Love, Al Jardine, Carl Wilson, Dennis Wilson)

The idea for a concert tour featuring The Beach Boys and Chicago was developed by James William Guercio. In the mid-1970s, he served as the talent manager for both bands, (Note: For The Beach Boys, Guercio served as a co-manager alongside Steve Love.) as well as a bass player for The Beach Boys and a record producer for Chicago. At the time, Chicago was at its peak in terms of commercial success and critical reception, while The Beach Boys were experiencing a revival in popularity owing to nostalgia for the 1960s. In 1974, The Beach Boys album Endless Summer was released, eventually reaching number 1 on record charts. Additionally, the band's live performances had become more popular, with Rolling Stone calling them "band of the year" in part because of their concerts. The New York Times reported that the joint tour was considered a way to counter flagging concert ticket sales due to the ongoing recession.

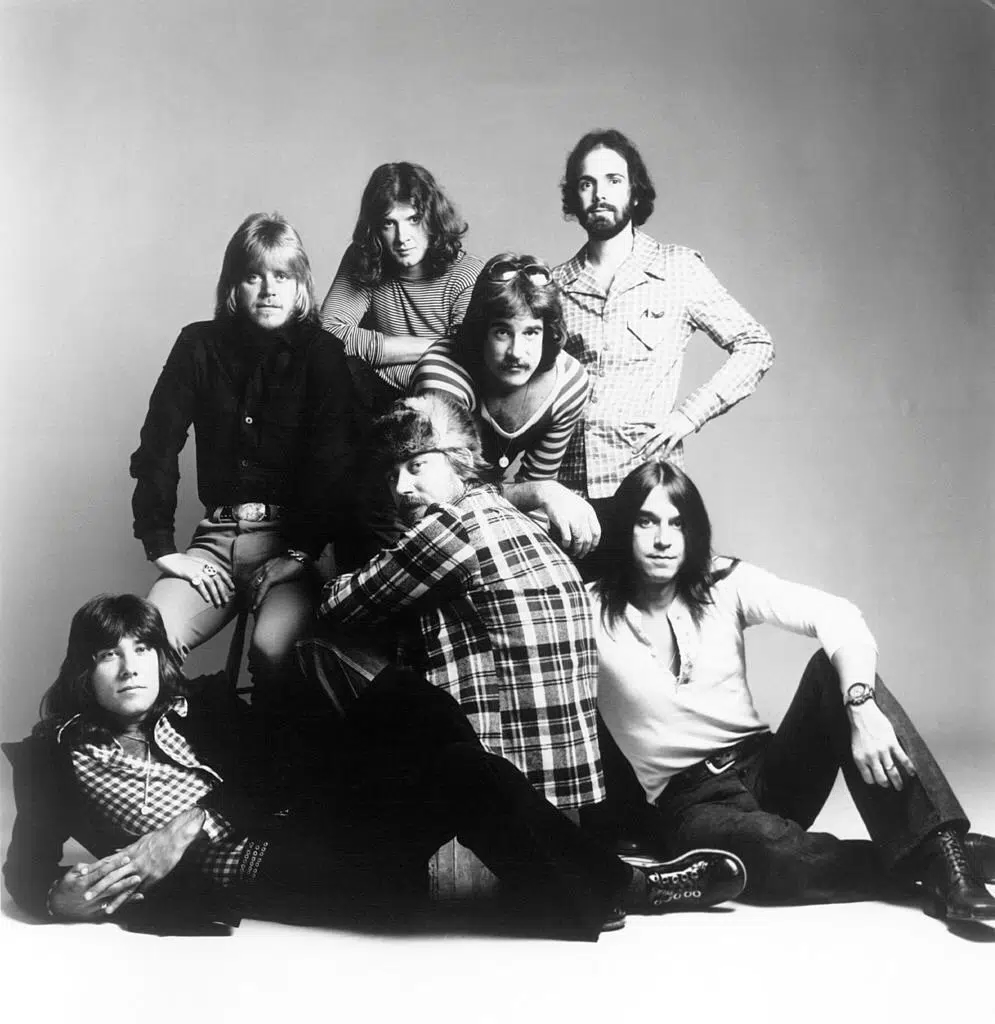
Chicago in 1975 (Note: From left to right, front: Robert Lamm, Terry Kath, Walter Parazaider; back: Peter Cetera, Lee Loughnane, James Pankow, Danny Seraphine)

Through 1974, the two bands collaborated on several occasions. On November 1, 1974, the two bands played together for a television program, and they performed alongside each other for that year's Dick Clark's New Year's Rockin' Eve television special. Additionally, The Beach Boys members Al Jardine, Carl Wilson, and Dennis Wilson, provided vocals for the Chicago song "Wishing You Were Here". According to Chicago member Lee Loughnane, The Beach Boys had been the first band that they had performed with.

Coinciding with the tour, both bands had new albums released in 1975. Chicago released Chicago VIII, while two compilation albums were released featuring music from The Beach Boys: Spirit of America (released by the band's former record label, Capitol Records) and Good Vibrations – Best of the Beach Boys (released by their then-current label, Reprise Records).

== Description ==
The tour, which was dubbed "Beachago", (Note: In a contemporary review in Rolling Stone, the event was called the "Summer of '75" tour.) commenced on May 2, 1975, and ended on July 6 of that year, with performances in 12 cities around the United States. During this time, The Beach Boys took breaks during the tour for other performances, including a June 21 performance at Wembley Stadium in London for the Midsummer Music Show and a July 1 performance with Ambrosia at the Spectrum in Philadelphia. During the May 24 show in Oakland, California, which was promoted by Bill Graham, Bob Seger performed. Brian Wilson, who was a founding member of The Beach Boys, did not participate in the tour.

The shows consisted of about one hour of The Beach Boys performing, followed by an hour of Chicago, and concluding with 45 minutes of the two bands playing together to close the show. According to The New York Times, the June 12 show held at Madison Square Garden lasted over four hours, while some shows lasted as long as six hours. In between the two bands' separate sets, Chicago would join The Beach Boys on stage and perform several songs together, with the set list for both consisting primarily of their greatest hits. For instance, during certain shows, Mike Love and Carl Wilson of The Beach Boys performed vocals for Chicago's song "Saturday in the Park". The bands ended the show with a cover of The Rolling Stones' song "Jumpin' Jack Flash". During some shows, trapeze artists performed above the stage.

== Reception ==
=== Critical response ===
Reviews for the tour generally considered The Beach Boys' performances to be superior to Chicago's. In a mixed review for The New York Times, music critic John Rockwell called the June 12 show at Madison Square Garden "amusingly mindless, although the Beach Boys were more amusing and Chicago more mindless". Additionally, he criticized the last two songs the bands performed—"Feelin' Stronger Every Day" and "Jumpin' Jack Flash"—calling the former "a decided letdown". Robert Christgau of The Village Voice called The Beach Boys' Madison Square Garden performance "a revelation", while Chicago was "tolerable". A review in Rolling Stone of the May 17 show in Kansas City, Missouri, noted that the crowd reacted more positively during The Beach Boys' set and that the peak in audience engagement during Chicago's performance occurred when The Beach Boys joined them onstage. In a 2022 retrospective for Far Out Magazine, Arun Starkey wrote that "the Beachago tour was one of the greatest, if not more surreal, that we’ve ever seen."

=== Commercial performance ===
Discussing the tour in a 2000 book, author Jon Stebbins called Beachago "one of the most lucrative tours of all time". The tour was attended by about 700,000 people in total, with shows averaging over 50,000 people each. In Chicago, the bands added a sixth night after selling out the five nights that they had initially scheduled in the city. The bands' four-night run in Madison Square Garden was performed before sold-out crowds each night, with attendances of about 20,000 people. This run grossed about $750,000 (equivalent to $4.5 million in 2025). In total, the tour grossed about $7.5 million ($44.9 million in 2025). The tour occurred around the same time as a United States tour by The Rolling Stones, with the two directly competing against each other in several markets and the joint tour outperforming them.

== Aftermath ==
Following the tour, The Beach Boys continued to collaborate with other bands and artists on tours, such as Elton John and Crosby, Stills, Nash & Young, and just a week after the tour ended, they headlined the Summerfest music festival in Milwaukee. According to Andy Greene of Rolling Stone, the tour represented the peak of Chicago's popularity.

During the tour, tensions arose between the two bands. According to Love, he had initially proposed that the shows should start with Chicago performing solo before transitioning into a section where both bands performed together. However, Love said that Chicago's bandmembers viewed their band as the bigger act and deserving of headliner status, with The Beach Boys serving as their opening act. Speaking in 2016 of the tour, Love said, "We thought they were condescending toward us, so before we took the stage on our first show in Houston, I told Dennis, 'We'll do an hour, and we'll kick their fucking ass, and they'll wish they never toured with us.'" Guercio also said that members of Chicago got into fights with him with regards to the tour and that he believed that The Beach Boys had been the better performers.

=== Later tours and recordings ===
According to The Beach Boys biographer Mark Dillon, plans by Guercio for an international Beachago tour were scrapped in 1976 after Dennis married actress Karen Lamm, who had previously been married to Chicago's keyboardist, Robert Lamm. The two had started dating around the time that the tour was taking place. Following the tour, Guercio was relieved of his duties as The Beach Boys' manager, with author Steven Gaines saying that some members of the band felt that Guercio's company, Caribou Records, had taken too large of a percentage of the tour's revenue. The two bands later held joint concert tours in 1989 and 2022.

Recordings were made during several shows for a live album, with a tentative release date of late 1975. This album never materialized and it was believed that many of the tapes were destroyed during a fire at the Caribou Ranch. However, in 2002, several tapes were found to be in Guercio's possession. In 2011, Chicago released Chicago XXXIV: Live in '75, which featured recordings taken during a June 1975 show at the Capital Centre during the tour.

== Set list ==
The following is a partial set list of the May 19 show at the St. Louis Arena showing The Beach Boys' individual set and the two bands' combined set.

The Beach Boys' set

1. "Sloop John B"
2. "Do It Again"
3. "Help Me, Rhonda"
4. "In My Room"
5. "Sail On, Sailor"
6. "California Saga/California"
7. "In the Back of My Mind"
8. "God Only Knows" (with Chicago's horn section)
9. "Surf's Up" (featuring Robert Lamm of Chicago on lead vocals)
10. "Darlin'" (with Chicago's horn section, featuring Peter Cetera of Chicago on lead vocals)
11. "Their Hearts Were Full of Spring"
12. "Surfer Girl"
13. "Heroes and Villains"
14. "Little Deuce Coupe"
15. "Catch a Wave"
16. "Wouldn't It Be Nice"
17. "I Get Around"
18. "Good Vibrations"
19. "Barbara Ann" (encore)
20. "Surfin' U.S.A." (encore)

Combined set

1. "Wishing You Were Here"
2. "Saturday in the Park"
3. "California Girls"
4. "Fun, Fun, Fun"
5. "Feelin' Stronger Every Day"
6. "Jumpin' Jack Flash"

== Shows ==
List of 1975 concerts
Date	City	Venue	Attendance
May 2	Houston, Texas	Jefferson Stadium	15,000
May 3	Dallas, Texas	Cotton Bowl	30,000
May 17	Kansas City, Missouri	Arrowhead Stadium	30,000
May 18	St. Louis, Missouri	St. Louis Arena	20,000
May 19	St. Louis, Missouri	St. Louis Arena	—
May 23	Anaheim, California	Anaheim Stadium	48, 371
May 24	Oakland, California	Oakland–Alameda County Coliseum	55,000
May 31	Cleveland, Ohio	Municipal Auditorium	26,000
June 1	Chicago, Illinois	Chicago Stadium	—
June 2	Chicago, Illinois	Chicago Stadium	—
June 3	Chicago, Illinois	Chicago Stadium	—
June 4	Chicago, Illinois	Chicago Stadium	—
June 5	Chicago, Illinois	Chicago Stadium	—
June 7	Chicago, Illinois	Chicago Stadium	—
June 12	New York City, New York	Madison Square Garden	—
June 13	New York City, New York	Madison Square Garden	—
June 14	New York City, New York	Madison Square Garden	—
June 15	New York City, New York	Madison Square Garden	—
June 24	Landover, Maryland	Capital Centre	—
June 25	Landover, Maryland	Capital Centre	—
June 26	Landover, Maryland	Capital Centre	—
June 27	Landover, Maryland	Capital Centre	—
June 28	Landover, Maryland	Capital Centre	—
June 29	Foxborough, Massachusetts	Schaefer Stadium	—
June 30	Foxborough, Massachusetts	Schaefer Stadium	—
July 3	Foxborough, Massachusetts	Schaefer Stadium	—
July 6	Fort Collins, Colorado	Colorado State Stadium	—

== See also ==
- The Beach Boys live performances
- The Beach Boys' unreleased and bootleg recordings

== Sources ==
- Badman, Keith (2004). The Beach Boys: The Definitive Diary of America's Greatest Band, on Stage and in the Studio (1st ed.). San Francisco: Backbeat Books. ISBN 978-0-87930-818-6. OCLC 56611695.
- Burton, Poppy (April 21, 2026). "The 1974 Chicago song that featured The Beach Boys". Far Out Magazine. Archived from the original on April 21, 2026.
- Carlin, Peter Ames (2006). Catch a Wave: The Rise, Fall & Redemption of the Beach Boys' Brian Wilson. Emmaus, Pennsylvania: Rodale, Inc. ISBN 978-1-59486-320-2. LCCN 2006004928. OCLC 63808119.
- Crowley, Kent (2015). Long Promised Road: Carl Wilson, Soul of the Beach Boys: The Biography (1st ed.). London: Jawbone Press. ISBN 978-1-908279-84-2. OCLC 900032104.
- Dillon, Mark (2012). Fifty Sides of the Beach Boys: The Songs that Tell Their Story. Toronto: ECW Press. ISBN 978-1-77041-071-8. OCLC 811407410.
- Edwards, Henry (June 8, 1975). "Recordings View: The Beach Boys Meet Chicago". The New York Times. p. 129. ISSN 0362-4331. OCLC 1645522. Archived from the original on June 25, 2026.
- Greene, Andy (May 2, 2011). "Exclusive: Hear Chicago's 'Introduction' from Their 1975 Tour". Rolling Stone. ISSN 3066-0580. OCLC 969027590. Archived from the original on November 21, 2019.
- Greene, Andy (December 2, 2021). "Flashback: Beach Boys and Chicago Team Up to Play 'Saturday in the Park' in 1975". Rolling Stone. Penske Media Corporation. ISSN 3066-0580. OCLC 969027590. Archived from the original on December 2, 2021.
- Greene, Andy (April 18, 2026). "Chicago's Horn Player Never Thought He'd Outlast His Bandmates". Rolling Stone. Penske Media Corporation. ISSN 3066-0580. OCLC 969027590. Archived from the original on April 18, 2026.
- Love, Mike (2016). Good Vibrations: My Life as a Beach Boy. With James S. Hirsch. New York City: Blue Rider Press. ISBN 978-0-399-17641-8. LCCN 2016026426. OCLC 951557365.
- Rockwell, John (June 14, 1975). "Chicago and the Beach Boys, Combined". The New York Times. p. 22. ISSN 0362-4331. OCLC 1645522. Archived from the original on August 24, 2017.
- Starkey, Arun (October 19, 2022). "Remembering when The Beach Boys and Chicago teamed up for the 'Beachago' tour". Far Out Magazine. Archived from the original on October 20, 2022.
- Stebbins, Jon (2000). Dennis Wilson: The Real Beach Boy. Toronto: ECW Press. ISBN 978-1-55022-404-7. LCCN 00362756. OCLC 45270618.
