= Chicago XXXIV: Live in '75 =

Live album by Chicago
- Released: May 24, 2011
- Recorded: June 24–26, 1975
- Venues: Capital Centre, Largo, Maryland
- Genres: Rock; jazz fusion
- Length: 114:47
- Label: Rhino Handmade

Chicago chronology
Chicago XXXIII: O Christmas Three (2011)	Chicago XXXIV: Live in '75 (2011)	Chicago XXXV: The Nashville Sessions (2013)

Chicago XXXIV: Live in '75 is a live album by the American rock band Chicago, their thirty-fourth album overall, recorded in 1975 and released in 2011. After releasing its eighth consecutive gold album in six years, Chicago embarked upon a stadium tour in 1975. The album includes selections from all of the group's albums through its then-current Chicago VIII.

== Track listing ==
Disc 1
No.	Title	Writer(s)	Length
1.	"Introduction"	Terry Kath	7:49
2.	"Anyway You Want"	Peter Cetera	3:57
3.	"Beginnings"	Robert Lamm	6:08
4.	"Does Anybody Really Know What Time It Is?"	Lamm	3:55
5.	"Call on Me"	Lee Loughnane	5:10
6.	"Make Me Smile"	James Pankow	3:19
7.	"So Much to Say, So Much to Give"	Pankow	0:58
8.	"Anxiety's Moment"	Pankow	0:56
9.	"West Virginia Fantasies"	Pankow	1:23
10.	"Colour My World"	Pankow	3:09
11.	"To Be Free"	Pankow	1:07
12.	"Now More Than Ever"	Pankow	4:06
13.	"Ain't It Blue?"	Lamm	3:47
14.	"Just You 'n' Me"	Pankow	5:05
15.	"(I've Been) Searchin' So Long"	Pankow	4:36
16.	"Mongonucleosis"	Pankow	12:29
17.	"Old Days"	Pankow	3:39
18.	"25 or 6 to 4"	Lamm	7:31
Total length:			76:11

Disc 2
No.	Title	Writer(s)	Length
1.	"Got to Get You into My Life"	Lennon–McCartney	3:32
2.	"Free"	Lamm	5:42
3.	"I'm a Man"	James Miller, Steve Winwood	13:04
4.	"Dialogue"	Lamm	8:00
5.	"Wishing You Were Here"	Cetera	4:54
6.	"Feelin' Stronger Every Day"	Cetera, Pankow	4:29
Total length:			38:36

== Personnel ==
Chicago (1975)

- Robert Lamm – vocals, keyboards
- Terry Kath – vocals, guitar
- Peter Cetera – vocals, bass
- Danny Seraphine – drums
- Laudir de Oliveira – congas, percussion
- Lee Loughnane – trumpet, vocals
- James Pankow – trombone
- Walter Parazaider – woodwinds

Technical personnel

- Andrew Sandoval – mixing
- Paul Smith – mixing assistant
- Charles Benson – mastering
