= Wishing You Were Here =

1974 single by Chicago

Single by Chicago

from the album Chicago VII
- B-side: "Life Saver"
- Released: October 2, 1974
- Recorded: 1973
- Studio: Caribou Ranch, Colorado
- Genre: Soft rock
- Length: 2:54 (Promo Version); 4:37 (Album Version)
- Label: Columbia
- Songwriter: Peter Cetera
- Producer: James William Guercio

Chicago singles chronology
"Call on Me" (1974)	"Wishing You Were Here" (1974)	"Harry Truman" (1975)

"Wishing You Were Here" is a song written by Peter Cetera for the group Chicago and recorded for their album Chicago VII (1974), with lead vocals by Terry Kath (uncredited on the original album package), while Cetera sang the song's bridge. The third single released from that album, it reached No. 11 on the U.S. Billboard Hot 100, No. 9 on the Cash Box Top 100, and hit No. 1 on the Easy Listening chart.

Kath and Cetera swap their usual instruments, with Kath on bass and Cetera on guitar. James William Guercio, Chicago's producer at the time, played guitar on the recording as well. Guercio appeared on stage with the band, playing acoustic guitar, when they performed the song on Chicago's New Year's Rockin' Eve 1975 to ring in 1975.

The instrumental track for the song had been recorded before Cetera realized it was too low for him to sing, so Kath performed the lead vocal instead. The Beach Boys' Al Jardine, Carl Wilson, and Dennis Wilson guested as backing vocalists.

== The Beach Boys' contribution ==
The Beach Boys were at Caribou Ranch when "Wishing You Were Here" was recorded, and three members of that band — Al Jardine, Carl Wilson, and Dennis Wilson — joined Cetera in singing the harmonies.

The Beach Boys' collaboration with Chicago continued into 1975, when the two bands teamed up for the "Beachago" tour. "Wishing You Were Here," as well as other Chicago songs such as "Feelin' Stronger Every Day," were performed by the two bands together. The bands revived their collaboration for a second "Beachago" tour in 1989, during which they also played this song. For the encore of one June 1989 performance, with Kath deceased and Cetera no longer in the band, Beach Boys Mike Love and Carl sang Kath and Cetera's lead vocals, respectively.

In 2022, The Brian Wilson Band and Chicago toured together. During the Chicago set, members of the Brian Wilson Band, including Al and Matt Jardine, joined the stage to perform the harmony parts.

== Critical reception ==
Cash Box called the song "a moving ballad" and "a very well produced and arranged tune, blended with soft brass", stating, "The abounding harmonies with the Beach Boys helping out are superb and the musicianship augments the beautifully lyrical picture the group paints." Billboard called the song a "haunting cut that builds subtly throughout, marked by superb instrumentation and vocal harmonies."

"Wishing You Were Here" was included in Chicago's 1991 four-CD compilation of music from the group's first twelve years, Group Portrait. In a review published by the Chicago Reader, rock music critic Bill Wyman was generally dismissive of Group Portrait, calling it "an altogether fitting testament to Chicago's hippie self-absorption and dopey excesses." However, Wyman singled out "Wishing You Were Here", saying it "stood out creatively from the band's usual unsubtle approach", that it was "to [his] mind Chicago's most notable performance", and that its songwriter, Cetera, "stands out as the most interesting person in the group."

== Personnel ==
- Terry Kath – lead vocals, bass guitar
- Peter Cetera – lead and backing vocals, classical acoustic guitar
- Robert Lamm – keyboards
- Danny Seraphine – drums
- Lee Loughnane – trumpet
- James Pankow – trombone
- Walter Parazaider – tenor saxophone

Additional Personnel

- Laudir de Oliveira – percussion
- James William Guercio – electric guitar
- David J. Wolinski – ARP synthesizer
- Al Jardine, Carl Wilson, and Dennis Wilson – backing vocals

== Chart performance ==
=== Weekly charts ===
Chart (1974)	Peak position
Australia ARIA	51
Canada RPM Top Singles	12
Canada RPM Adult Contemporary	5
US Billboard Hot 100	11
US Billboard Easy Listening	1
U.S. Cash Box Top 100	9

=== Year-end charts ===
Chart (1974)	Rank
Canada RPM Top Singles	124
U.S. (Joel Whitburn's Pop Annual)	111

== See also ==
- List of number-one adult contemporary singles of 1974 (U.S.)
