= Skinny Boy =

Studio album by Robert Lamm
- Released: 1974
- Recorded: 1973–1974
- Studio: Caribou Ranch Nederland, Colorado Sound Labs Hollywood, California
- Genre: Rock; pop; soul
- Length: 33:54
- Label: Columbia
- Producer: Robert Lamm

Robert Lamm chronology
Skinny Boy (1974)	Life Is Good in My Neighborhood (1993)

Singles from Skinny Boy
- 1. "Skinny Boy" Released: 1974

Professional ratings
Review scores
Source	Rating
AllMusic	2/5 stars

Skinny Boy is the debut solo album by Chicago's keyboard player Robert Lamm released in 1974 on Columbia Records. It has the distinction of being the first solo effort by any Chicago band member. The title track, "Skinny Boy," was also used on Chicago VII with horns added and an extended outro.

The release sold poorly and failed to chart.

== Track listing ==
All songs written by Robert Lamm, except where noted.

1. "Temporary Jones" (Robert Lamm, Robert Russell (Note: Some time after Russell's death in 1970, his family gave Lamm some of his unused lyrics, including the ones to this song.)) 3:30
2. "Love Song" 3:10
3. "Crazy Way to Spend a Year" 3:22
4. "Until the Time Runs Out" 2:26
5. "Skinny Boy" 4:30
6. "One Step Forward Two Steps Back" 3:10
7. "Fireplace and Ivy" 3:40
8. "Someday I'm Gonna Go" 1:40
9. "A Lifetime We" 3:10
10. "City Living" 2:30
11. "Crazy Brother John" 2:46

== Personnel ==
- Robert Lamm – lead vocals, piano, electric piano, clavinet
- Terry Kath – bass, acoustic guitar
- James Vincent – electric guitar
- Alan De Carlo – acoustic guitar
- Ross Salomone – drums
- Guille Garcia – congas, percussion
- Gloria Strassner, Jerry Kessler, Jesse Ehrlich, Selene Hurford – cello
- Jan Hlinka, Joseph Reilich, Myer Bello, Myron Sandler, William Hymanson, Yukiko Kamei – viola
- Carl La Magna, Claire Hodgkins, Debbie Grossman, Endre Granat, Jerome Reisler, Joy Lyle, Leonard Malarsky, Robert Sushel, Sidney Sharp, Stanley Plummer, Tibor Zelig, William Kurasch – violin
- William Collette – woodwind
- Pointer Sisters – backing vocals
