= Feel (Chicago song) =

Single by Chicago

from the album Chicago XXX
- A-side: "Feel" (Hot Horn mix)
- B-side: "Feel" (Single mix)
- Released: March 2006
- Recorded: 2005
- Genre: Rock
- Length: 4:01 (single mix); 4:30 (hot horn mix)
- Label: Rhino
- Songwriters: Danny Orton; Blair Daly
- Producer: Jay DeMarcus

Chicago singles chronology
"Back to You" (1999)	"Feel" (2006)	"Love Will Come Back" (2006)

"Feel" is a song by the American rock band Chicago. It was included on their twentieth studio album, Chicago XXX, which features two mixes of the song: the single mix and the hot horn mix. Danny Orton and Blair Daly wrote the track and Robert Lamm sang the lead vocals.

The song was released as a single and peaked at No. 19 on the US Billboard Adult Contemporary chart. It was their first single to be released on Rhino Records.

== Background ==
Lamm recounted his initial thoughts on "Feel" in the liner notes of The Best of Chicago: 40th Anniversary Edition.

When I first heard the demo of that song, I just got chills. Everybody turned around in the control room and looked at me and said, "Guess what? You're singing it". I was surprised, because I wasn't singing a lot of leads. So it was my honor to perform that song. I totally related to it-the first couple times I performed it live, I was getting a lump in my throat. The lyrics resonated with me perfectly.

Commenting on the two mixes of "Feel" on Chicago XXX, the band's trumpet player, Lee Loughnane told Tulsa World that he was "not quite sure why we had two different versions, but that's the way it came out." He also said that "when you hear us live, you're going to hear the one with the brass."

== Critical reception ==
Jimmy Nelson of Something Else! Reviews believed that "Feel" was a formulaic song with a "mechanical rhythm structure" and generic lyrics, although he was more complimentary of the song's horn mix, saying that the brass was "particularly effective".

Stephen Thomas Erlewine of AllMusic felt that the hot mix of "Feel" was the only track on Chicago XXX that suggested elements of 21st-century production. Christa L. Titus reviewed the song for Billboard, where she expressed her belief that the brass on the "Horn Mix" were less prominent than some of Chicago's earlier singles such as "25 or 6 to 4". She also found the lyrics to be unoriginal but effective at conveying the concept of "break[ing] free from a miserable existence."

== Chart performance ==
Chart (2006)	Peak position
US Adult Contemporary (Billboard)	19
