= (I've Been) Searchin' So Long =

Single by Chicago

from the album Chicago VII
- B-side: "Byblos"
- Released: February 21, 1974
- Recorded: 1973
- Genre: Soft rock
- Length: 4:29; 4:19 (7" version)
- Label: Columbia
- Songwriter: James Pankow
- Producer: James William Guercio

Chicago singles chronology
"Just You 'n' Me" (1973)	"(I've Been) Searchin' So Long" (1974)	"Call on Me" (1974)

"(I've Been) Searchin' So Long" is a song written by James Pankow for the group Chicago and recorded for their album Chicago VII (1974). The first single released from that album, it reached number 9 on the U.S. Billboard Hot 100. It also hit number 8 on the Adult Contemporary chart. In Canada, the song peaked at number 5.

== Background ==
Cash Box said that "this dreamy, progressive ballad [is] reminiscent of...Yes and the Beach Boys with that definite patented Chicago drive," and also praised the "sensitive musical execution and slowly intensifying vocals."

Rick Beato dedicated an entire show in trying to determine which Chicago song was the best, and this one was a close #2 in his opinion to "Saturday in the Park".

== Personnel ==
- Peter Cetera – lead vocals, bass guitar, fretless bass
- Robert Lamm – Fender Rhodes electric piano, Minimoog synthesizer, backing vocals
- Terry Kath – phased/fuzzed wah-wah electric guitar, backing vocals
- Danny Seraphine – drums
- Lee Loughnane – trumpet, backing vocals
- James Pankow – trombone, percussion, backing vocals
- Walter Parazaider – tenor saxophone

Additional Personnel

- David J. Wolinski – ARP synthesizer
- Laudir de Oliveira – congas
- Jimmie Haskell – strings

== Chart performance ==
=== Weekly charts ===
Chart (1974)	Peak position
Australia Kent Music Report	44
Canada RPM Top Singles	5
Canada RPM Adult Contemporary	16
U.S. Billboard Hot 100	9
U.S. Billboard Easy Listening	8
U.S. Cash Box Top 100	7

=== Year-end charts ===
Chart (1974)	Rank
Canada RPM Top Singles	76
U.S. Billboard Hot 100	73
