= Chicago XXX =

Studio album by Chicago
- Released: March 21, 2006
- Recorded: Summer 2005
- Genre: Rock
- Length: 52:57
- Label: Rhino
- Producer: Jay DeMarcus

Chicago chronology
Love Songs (2005)	Chicago XXX (2006)	The Best Of Chicago: 40th Anniversary Edition (2007)

Singles from Chicago XXX
- 1. "Feel" Released: March 2006; 2. "Love Will Come Back" Released: April 2006

Professional ratings
Review scores
Source	Rating
AllMusic	3.5/5 stars

Chicago XXX is the twentieth studio album, and thirtieth album overall, by the American band Chicago, released on March 21, 2006. It was Chicago's first album of entirely new material since 1991's Twenty 1, while its gap of eight years from 1998's Chicago XXV: The Christmas Album marks the longest between two of the band's studio albums to date.

== Background ==
The album was recorded in Nashville, Tennessee with horn sessions in Los Angeles, California over the summer of 2005. Production duties were handled by Jay DeMarcus of the country group Rascal Flatts, who came to the project through a friendship with Chicago's bassist-singer Jason Scheff. DeMarcus used several session players for the album.

Chicago XXX peaked at number 41 in the US during a brief chart stay, spawning minor hits "Feel" and "Love Will Come Back." This would be the last new studio album with long-time vocalist and keyboardist Bill Champlin before his departure in 2009 (while he appeared on the band's following album Chicago XXXII: Stone of Sisyphus in 2008, that album consisted of recordings produced in 1993).

== Track listing ==
No.	Title	Writer(s)	Lead vocals	Length
1.	"Feel" (Hot single mix)	Danny Orton, Blair Daly	Robert Lamm	4:01
2.	"King of Might Have Been"	Greg Barnhill, Jason Scheff, Dennis Matkosky	Jason Scheff	3:52
3.	"Caroline"	Scheff, Chas Sandford	Champlin/Scheff	3:39
4.	"Why Can't We"	Bill Champlin, Jay DeMarcus, Scheff, Sandford	Champlin/Shelly Fairchild	4:07
5.	"Love Will Come Back" (featuring Rascal Flatts)	Scheff, DeMarcus, Sandford	Scheff/Gary LeVox/Jay DeMarcus/Champlin/Joe Don Rooney	3:48
6.	"Long Lost Friend"	Scheff, DeMarcus, Brett James	Scheff	4:33
7.	"90 Degrees and Freezing"	Lamm, Scheff, DeMarcus, James	Lamm/Scheff	3:52
8.	"Where Were You"	Scheff, Champlin, DeMarcus	Scheff/Champlin	4:17
9.	"Already Gone"	Champlin, George Hawkins Jr.	Champlin/Scheff	6:51
10.	"Come to Me, Do"	Lamm	Lamm	4:36
11.	"Lovin' Chains"	DeMarcus, Marcus Hummon	Champlin/Scheff	3:56
12.	"Better"	Champlin, Sandford	Champlin	4:41
13.	"Feel" (Horn section mix)	Orton, Daly	Lamm	4:30

== Personnel ==
=== Chicago ===
- Robert Lamm – vocals, acoustic piano, Wurlitzer electric piano, Hammond B3 organ, horn arrangements (10)
- Lee Loughnane – trumpet, flugelhorn, piccolo trumpet
- James Pankow – trombone, horn arrangements (2–9, 11–13)
- Walt Parazaider – saxophones, flutes
- Bill Champlin – vocals, Hammond B3 organ, acoustic piano, Fender Rhodes, BGV arrangements
- Jason Scheff – vocals, bass, BGV arrangements
- Tris Imboden – drums (1, 5, 7–13)
- Keith Howland – guitars

=== Additional musicians ===
- Jay DeMarcus – keyboards, guitars, loops, programming, acoustic piano (2), arrangements
- James Matchack – keyboards, loops, sequencing, arrangements
- Tom Bukovac – acoustic guitar, electric guitar
- Dann Huff – guitars (3–5, 7, 9, 11)
- Jack Kincaid – guitars (6)
- Yankton Mingua – guitars (6)
- Dean DeLeo – guitars (12)
- John Brockman – drums (2, 6)
- Steve Brewster – drums (3, 4)
- Lee Thornburg – trumpet
- Joseph Williams – additional backing vocals (2)
- Bobby Kimball – additional backing vocals (3)
- Shelly Fairchild – lead vocal (4)
- Rascal Flatts (Gary LeVox, Jay DeMarcus and Joe Don Rooney) – guest vocals (5)

=== Production ===
- Produced by Jay DeMarcus
- Production Coordinator – Mike "Frog" Griffith
- Recorded by Jeff Balding, Ben Fowler, James Matchack, Sean Neff and Chas Sanford.
- Assistant Engineers – David Fricks, Jay Goin, Jed Hackett, Jody Sappington, Aaron Walk and Tony Zeller.
- Tracks #1, 2 & 7–13 mixed by Jeff Balding, assisted by Jed Hackett.
- Tracks #3–6 mixed by James Matchack
- Digital Editing – Jed Hackett and Sean Neff
- Mastered by Bob Ludwig at Gateway Mastering (Portland, ME).
- Photography by Jimmy Katz and Hugh Brown, assisted by Andy Strauss.
- Design by Hugh Brown, assisted by Andy Strauss.

== Charts ==
Album - Billboard (United States)

Year	Chart	Position
2006	Billboard 200	41

Singles - Billboard (United States)

Year	Single	Chart	Position
2006	"Feel"	Adult Contemporary	19
2006	"Love Will Come Back"	Adult Contemporary	21
