= Chicago XXXIII: O Christmas Three =

Studio album by Chicago
- Released: October 4, 2011
- Recorded: October 2010
- Genres: Rock; Christmas
- Length: 53:23
- Label: Chicago II Records
- Producer: Phil Ramone

Chicago chronology
Chicago XXXII: Stone of Sisyphus (2008)	Chicago XXXIII: O Christmas Three (2011)	Chicago XXXIV: Live in ‘75 (2011)

Chicago XXXIII: O Christmas Three is the twenty-second studio album, the second full album of Christmas songs, and thirty-third overall by the American rock band Chicago. The album was released on October 4, 2011. The collection includes a variety of holiday classics and a new tune, "Rockin' and Rollin' on Christmas Day", co-written by founding trumpet player Lee Loughnane.

The album was produced by veteran producer Phil Ramone, who co-produced the band's albums Hot Streets (1978) and Chicago 13 (1979). The album features guest artists Dolly Parton on Paul McCartney's "Wonderful Christmas Time", America on "I Saw Three Ships", BeBe Winans on "Merry Christmas Darling", and guitarist Steve Cropper on "Rockin’ and Rollin’ on Christmas Day".

Chicago XXXIII: O Christmas Three was preceded by Chicago XXV: The Christmas Album in 1998, which, itself, was reissued in 1999 with one new track; and in 2003 under a new title, What's It Gonna Be, Santa?, with six new tracks.

== Track listing ==
No.	Title	Writer(s)	Vocals	Length
1.	"Wonderful Christmas Time" (featuring Dolly Parton)	Paul McCartney	Scheff, Dolly Parton	3:50
2.	"Rockin' Around the Christmas Tree"	Johnny Marks	Howland, Scheff	3:38
3.	"I Saw Three Ships" (featuring America)	(Traditional)	Lamm, America	3:15
4.	"Merry Christmas, Happy Holidays"	Justin Timberlake; JC Chasez; Veit Renn	Pardini	4:21
5.	"What Are You Doing New Year's Eve?"	Frank Loesser	Scheff	5:16
6.	"It's the Most Wonderful Time of the Year"	Edward Pola; George Wyle	Loughnane	3:42
7.	"I'll Be Home for Christmas"	Kim Gannon; Walter Kent; Buck Ram	Pardini	3:36
8.	"On The Last Night Of The Year"	Phil Galdston; Michael Whalen	Lamm	3:48
9.	"Merry Christmas Darling" (featuring Bebe Winans)	Richard Carpenter; Frank Pooler	BeBe Winans	3:22
10.	"Rockin' and Rollin' on Christmas Day" (featuring Steve Cropper)	Lee Loughnane; John Durill	Loughnane	4:19
11.	"My Favorite Things"	Richard Rodgers; Oscar Hammerstein II	Lamm	3:30
12.	"O Christmas Tree"	(Traditional)	Howland, Scheff	3:54
13.	"Jingle Bells"	James Lord Pierpont	Pardini	3:40
14.	"Here Comes Santa Claus/Joy to the World" (with Children's Choir)	Gene Autry; Oakley Haldeman/Isaac Watts	Pardini; children's choir	3:03
Total length:				53:23

== Personnel ==
Chicago

- Robert Lamm – keyboards, vocals, arrangements (3, 8, 11), horn arrangement (8, 11)
- Lee Loughnane – trumpets, vocals, arrangements (6, 10), horn arrangement (10)
- James Pankow – trombone, horn arrangement (1, 2, 4–7, 9, 12, 14), arrangements (7, 14)
- Walter Parazaider – saxophones, flute
- Jason Scheff – bass, vocals, arrangements (1, 5, 12)
- Tris Imboden – drums, arrangements (12)
- Keith Howland – guitars, vocals, arrangements (2, 12)
- Lou Pardini – keyboards, vocals, arrangements (4, 7, 13)
- Drew Hester – percussion

Additional personnel

- America (Gerry Beckley and Dewey Bunnell) – vocals, ukuleles, guitars and vocal arrangement ("I Saw Three Ships")
- Hank Linderman – cuatro ("I Saw Three Ships")
- Dolly Parton – vocals ("Wonderful Christmas Time")
- Bebe Winans – vocals ("Merry Christmas Darling")
- Steve Cropper – guitar ("Rockin’ And Rollin’ On Christmas Day")
- Children's Choir: Grace Howland, Hope Howland, Lydia Young, Jillian DeGrie, Lilli Pankow, Carter Pankow, Connor Scheff, Jason Scheff Jr. – vocals ("Here Comes Santa Claus"/"Joy To The World")

Production

- Produced by Phil Ramone
- Management – Peter Schivarelli
- Recorded by Matt Coles and Adam Deane at The Sound Kitchen (Franklin, TN).
- Pre-Mix Crew – Drew Hester and Keith Smith
- Mixed by B.J. Ramone at Morrisound Studios (Tampa, FL) and Shire Studios (CT).
- Art Direction – Bobby Woods

== Sources ==
- Chicago Records II (Chicago XXXIII: O Christmas Three)
- AllMusic: http://www.allmusic.com/album/o-christmas-three-r2324365
