= Guille Garcia =

American singer-songwriter

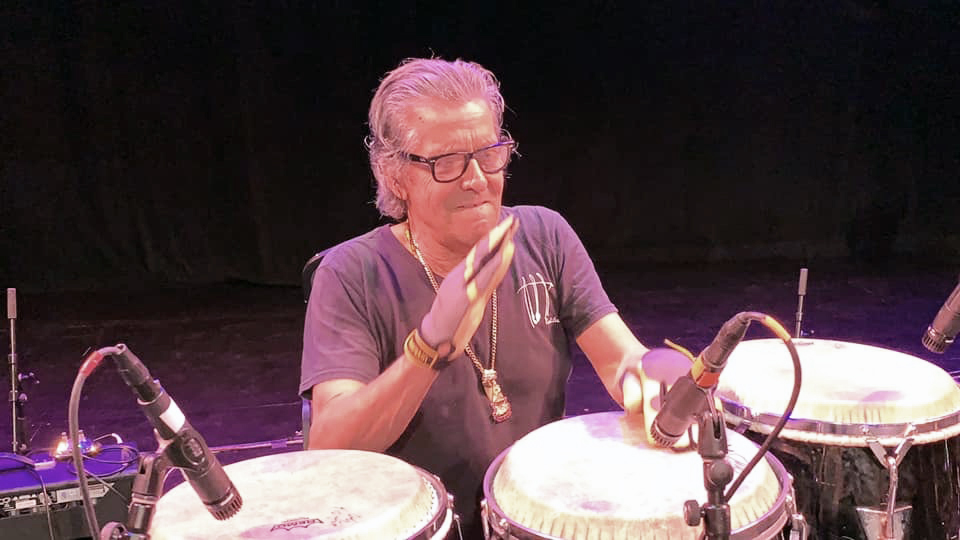

Background information
- Born: Guillermo Garcia Rodiles; 1947 (age 78–79); Havana, Cuba
- Origin: Coconut Grove, Florida, U.S.
- Genres: Latin pop; jazz rock; pop; world fusion
- Occupations: Musician; drummer; businessman
- Instruments: Guitar; drums; percussion
- Years active: 1971–present
- Label: Columbia

Guille Garcia Rodiles (born November 1947) is a Cuban-born American percussionist, singer, and songwriter. He played congas and drums with the jazz rock band Chicago and toured with them in 1973 before being replaced by future full-fledged member Laudir de Oliveira. (Note: In a 2008 interview, Robert Lamm mentions Garcia as having very briefly been a member of Chicago before de Oliveira but doesn't give details. No other source appears to support this.) He has also collaborated with bands and singers such as Manassas and Stephen Stills, Captain Beyond, Bill Wyman, Robert Lamm, Bonnie Koloc, John Lennon, Ringo Starr, Stevie Wonder, and Joe Walsh from The Eagles.
