= Madura (band) =

- Origin: Chicago, Illinois, United States
- Genres: Progressive rock, Psychedelic rock, Jazz rock, Blues rock

Madura was a 1970s Jazz-rock band from Chicago. The band was formed from the remains of Bangor Flying Circus in 1970 by Alan DeCarlo and Hawk Wolinski

== History ==
After the breakup of Bangor Flying Circus (1969), Alan DeCarlo and Hawk Wolinski formed Madura, replacing Bangor Flying Circus drummer Michael Tegza with Ross Salomone.

David "Hawk" Wolinski, previous Shadows of Knight member; Alan DeCarlo and Ross Salomone recorded two albums, produced by the Chicago producer James William Guercio. Madura often opened on tour with Chicago in 1971 and 1972. Hawk Wolinski later became a member of Rufus and Chaka Khan, and a successful producer and songwriter. Alan DeCarlo and Ross Salomone both appeared on Chicago keyboard player Robert Lamm's 1974 solo album Skinny Boy. Ross Salomone also appeared on albums by Chicago, Air Supply, Gerard, and Hollins & Star. Hawk Wolinski co-wrote (with Chicago's Danny Seraphine) 8 songs that appeared on various Chicago albums. Hawk Wolinski also performed on 5 different Chicago albums.

Madura can be seen and heard live on a short concert scene in J.W. Guercio's movie Electra Glide in Blue (1973) playing a part of the song "Free From The Devil". This is also included on the album from the movie. David Wolinski also appears as an actor in the movie, playing the part of a driver.

The band's history is the subject of a documentary, The Unfamous Life of Alan DeCarlo. The band's name "Madura" was inspired by the Meenakshi Temple in Madurai.

== Discography ==
- Madura LP (double album) - Columbia G - 30794 1971
- Madura II LP - Columbia KC - 32545 1973
- Johnny B. Goode part I & II 45 - Columbia - 4-45483 1971
- Save the Miracle 45 - Columbia - 4-46022 1973
