= Bangor Flying Circus =

- Origin: Chicago, Illinois, United States
- Genre: Progressive rock
- Years active: 1967-1969
- Formerly of: Shadows of Knight, H.P. Lovecraft, Madura

Bangor Flying Circus was an American progressive rock trio from Chicago, Illinois, formed in mid-1967 and breaking up in 1969. It is notable for being formed by members of the Shadows of Knight and H.P. Lovecraft and for being a predecessor band to Madura.

== History ==
Bangor Flying Circus consisted of David "Hawk" Wolinski (bass, keyboards, vocals), Alan "Addison Al" DeCarlo (guitar, vocals), and Tom Schiffour (drums), who was replaced in late 1968 by former H.P. Lovecraft member Michael Tegza (drums, percussion). Wolinski and Schiffour had previously been in the Shadows of Knight. They put out one self-titled album in 1969, which peaked at number 190 on Billboard 200. After they broke up, Wolinski and DeCarlo formed Madura, while Tegza participated in two reconfigurations of Lovecraft, a successor band to H.P. Lovecraft.

== Discography ==
- Bangor Flying Circus (1969)
