= Chicago VII =

Studio album by Chicago
- Released: March 11, 1974
- Recorded: August – December 1973
- Studios: Caribou Ranch, Nederland, Colorado
- Genres: Jazz fusion; jazz; soft rock; progressive rock; symphonic rock
- Length: 72:15
- Label: Columbia
- Producer: James William Guercio

Chicago chronology
Chicago VI (1973)	Chicago VII (1974)	Chicago VIII (1975)

Singles from Chicago VII
- 1. "(I've Been) Searchin' So Long" Released: February 1974; 2. "Call on Me" Released: June 1974; 3. "Wishing You Were Here" Released: October 1974

Professional ratings
Review scores
Source	Rating
Allmusic	3/5 stars
Rolling Stone	(not rated)

Chicago VII is the sixth studio album by American rock band Chicago. It was released on March 11, 1974, by Columbia Records. It is notable for being their first double album of new material since 1971's Chicago III and remains their final studio release in that format. It features session percussionist Laudir de Oliveira, who would become a full-fledged band member for the release of Chicago VIII the following year.

== Background ==
While touring in support of Chicago VI in 1973, the band began getting restless and started integrating some lengthy jazz instrumentals into their sets. While audiences' reactions varied, Chicago greatly enjoyed the experience, decided (after years of talking about it) to record a pure jazz-influenced set of tracks, and headed straight to producer James William Guercio's Caribou Ranch studios to cut their ambitious new album.

While the sessions began well, there was soon dissension within the group about the jazz project, with, reportedly, Peter Cetera and Guercio both wary of the commercial risk of such an undertaking. While the band reasoned that some of the jazzy material was too good to throw away, the others finally relented and accepted including the more pop and rock-oriented songs that the band had composed in the meantime. Almost by accident, Chicago had another double album on their hands.

Of the more conventional material, Chicago once again turned in a varied set of songs, with Terry Kath's "Byblos", named after a club that Chicago had played in Osaka, Japan, ranking among his best efforts. Robert Lamm, who was recording a solo album entitled Skinny Boy at the time, turned in several new songs, even donating his solo album's title track, featuring The Pointer Sisters on backing vocals. James Pankow came through with another success, "(I've Been) Searchin' So Long" (#9), and trumpeter Lee Loughnane succeeded on his first try at songwriting with the hit "Call on Me" (#6). Peter Cetera made the biggest strides on Chicago VII, composing "Happy Man" and "Wishing You Were Here" (#11), a lush ballad (signs of the future, taking the band even farther from their original style and sound) that features three of The Beach Boys on backing vocals and which became a big hit in late 1974. "Happy Man" was subsequently covered by Tony Orlando and Dawn on their album To Be With You. Peter Cetera also covered "Happy Man" in 1995 on his solo album One Clear Voice and again in 2005 on his solo album Faithfully which is a re-release of One Clear Voice.

Chicago VII is notable for having writing contributions from all (and only) the members of the band, and for having most of the members stretching out in new ways: Loughnane sang lead ("Song of the Evergreens") and wrote a song, Pankow sang backup, Kath played bass, Cetera played guitar, and Walter Parazaider and Danny Seraphine composed.

Released in March 1974, Chicago VII - despite its first disc being almost exclusively jazz instrumentals - reached #1 in the US, becoming another big success for the band.

The album was mixed and released in both stereo and quadraphonic. In 2002, Chicago VII was remastered and reissued on one CD by Rhino Records with one bonus track: an early rehearsal of Kath's "Byblos". Initial pressings of this edition contained an edited version of the track "Happy Man" that had appeared on Greatest Hits, Volume II, which omitted the "false start" and studio countdown heard on the original Chicago VII LP.

== Track listing ==
Side one
No.	Title	Writer(s)	Vocals	Length
1.	"Prelude to Aire"	Danny Seraphine	Instrumental	2:47
2.	"Aire"	Seraphine, Walter Parazaider, James Pankow	Instrumental	6:27
3.	"Devil's Sweet"	Seraphine, Parazaider	Instrumental	10:07

Side two
No.	Title	Writer(s)	Vocals	Length
4.	"Italian from New York"	Robert Lamm	Instrumental	4:14
5.	"Hanky Panky"	Lamm	Instrumental	1:53
6.	"Life Saver"	Lamm	Lamm	5:18
7.	"Happy Man"	Peter Cetera	Cetera	3:34

Side three
No.	Title	Writer(s)	Vocals	Length
8.	"(I've Been) Searchin' So Long"	Pankow	Cetera	4:29
9.	"Mongonucleosis"	Pankow	Cetera, Lamm, Pankow (briefly at the beginning)	3:26
10.	"Song of the Evergreens"	Terry Kath	Lee Loughnane	5:20
11.	"Byblos"	Kath	Kath	6:18

Side four
No.	Title	Writer(s)	Vocals	Length
12.	"Wishing You Were Here"	Cetera	Kath, Cetera	4:37
13.	"Call on Me"	Loughnane	Cetera	4:02
14.	"Woman Don't Want to Love Me"	Lamm	Cetera	4:35
15.	"Skinny Boy"	Lamm	Lamm	5:12

2002 reissue bonus track
No.	Title	Writer(s)	Length
16.	"Byblos" (Rehearsal)	Kath	5:40

== Personnel ==
=== Chicago ===
- Peter Cetera – bass, lead vocals, backing vocals (6, 8, 9, 12, 13), guitar (12)
- Terry Kath – guitars, lead vocals, backing vocals (6, 8, 10), bass (7, 11, 12, 15), bells (10)
- Robert Lamm – Mellotron (1), keyboards (2), Fender Rhodes (3–8, 13, 15), ARP synthesizer (4), clavinet (6, 14), backing vocals (6, 8, 9, 13), acoustic piano (8, 9, 12, 14), Minimoog (8, 12), lead vocals
- Danny Seraphine – drums, percussion (7, 12), hi-hat (11), bass drum (11)
- Lee Loughnane – trumpet, flugelhorn (3, 5), backing vocals (6, 8, 10, 13), lead vocals (10)
- James Pankow – trombone, percussion (8), backing vocals (8, 9), timbales (9)
- Walter Parazaider – tenor saxophone, flute (1, 2), soprano saxophone (3), alto saxophone (9)
- Brass arrangements (4) by James Pankow and Robert Lamm; (2, 5, 6, 8, 9, 12–15) by James Pankow

=== Additional musicians ===
- David Wolinski – ARP synthesizer (3, 8, 12), acoustic piano (10), Mellotron (11), Fender Rhodes (11)
- Wayne Tarnowski – acoustic piano (11)
- James William Guercio – acoustic guitar (7), bass (10), guitar (12)
- Ross Salomone – drums (15)
- Laudir de Oliveira – percussion (1, 3, 4, 6, 7, 9, 11–13, 16), congas (2, 4, 6, 8)
- Guille Garcia – percussion (7), congas (9, 11, 13, 15)
- Jimmie Haskell – strings (8)
- Bobbi Roen, Camelia Ortiz, Diane Nini, Hank Steiger and Julie Nini – background party noises (9)
- Al Jardine, Carl Wilson and Dennis Wilson – backing vocals (12)
- The Pointer Sisters – backing vocals (15)

== Production ==
- Produced by James William Guercio
- Engineered by Wayne Tarnowski and Jeff Guercio
- Strings recorded by Armin Steiner at Sound Labs (Hollywood, CA).
- Mixed by Phil Ramone
- Cover Photo – John Berg and Nick Fasciano
- Photography – Urve Kuusik

== Charts ==
=== Weekly charts ===
Chart (1974–1975)	Position
Australian Albums (Kent Music Report)	13
Canada Top Albums/CDs (RPM)	4
Japanese Albums (Oricon)	36
Norwegian Albums (VG-lista)	13
US Billboard 200	1

=== Year-end charts ===
Chart (1974)	Position
US Billboard 200	25

Chart (1975)	Position
US Billboard 200	69

== Certifications ==
Region	Certification	Certified units/sales
Canada (Music Canada)	Gold	50,000^{^}
United States (RIAA)	Platinum	1,000,000^{^}
^{^} Shipments figures based on certification alone.
