= Call on Me (Chicago song) =

Single by Chicago

from the album Chicago VII
- B-side: "Prelude to Aire"
- Released: May 31, 1974
- Recorded: 1973
- Genre: Soft rock, jazz fusion
- Length: 4:02
- Label: Columbia
- Songwriter: Lee Loughnane
- Producer: James William Guercio

Chicago singles chronology
"(I've Been) Searchin' So Long" (1974)	"Call on Me" (1974)	"Wishing You Were Here" (1974)

"Call on Me" is a song written by Lee Loughnane for the group Chicago and recorded for their album Chicago VII (1974). Peter Cetera sang lead vocals and the arrangement makes prominent use of conga drums played by Guille Garcia.

== Background ==
"Call on Me" was the first Loughnane composition to be released by the band. It was written with uncredited help from Peter Cetera. Loughnane was the last original Chicago member to receive a songwriting credit.

According to Cetera, though, he needed some help. "I tried to help Lee Loughnane with a song," Cetera says, "and that song turned out to be 'Call On Me.' Lee had written a song. It wasn't called, 'Call On Me,' it was called something else, and it in fact was terrible. I talked to him at the ranch one day, and he was all bent out of shape. He said that he had played the song for the guys, and they had told him in fact to get the heck out of there with the song. I said, 'Well, come on, let's have a go.' So Lee and I went and re-wrote the lyrics and re-wrote the melody and came up with the song called, 'Call On Me,' which was a big hit for him." Loughnane remembers it a little differently. "Peter changed a couple of the words and the way he sang the melody in order for him to be able to play the bass and sing the melody at the same time because that's the way he felt it." Loughnane added, "I appreciate his efforts, and we did make the song a hit."

The actual main lyric is “Count On Me” (rather than “Call On Me”) as that lyric is sung the most in the choruses.

== Reception ==
Billboard described "Call on Me" as a "good, summer sounding disk" that sounds a little like Chicago's earlier single "Saturday in the Park." Record World said that the "light Latin lilt is perfect for summer airwaves." Cashbox characterized it as a "moderately paced tune" that "has a certain summer flair in the group's patented laid back jazz-rock style."

== Personnel ==
- Peter Cetera – lead and backing vocals, bass
- Robert Lamm – Fender Rhodes electric piano, backing vocals
- Terry Kath – phased/delayed wah-wah electric guitars, backing vocals
- Danny Seraphine – drums
- Lee Loughnane – trumpet, backing vocals
- James Pankow – trombone, brass arrangement
- Walter Parazaider – tenor saxophone

Additional Personnel

- Guille Garcia – congas
- Laudir de Oliveira – percussion

== Chart performance ==
The second single released from the album, it reached number six on the US Billboard Hot 100 and number one on the Easy Listening chart.

=== Weekly charts ===
Chart (1974)	Peak position
Canada Top Singles (RPM)	9
US Billboard Hot 100	6
US Billboard Adult Contemporary	1
US Cash Box Top 100	10

=== Year-end charts ===
Chart (1974)	Rank
Canada	100
US Billboard Hot 100	98

== See also ==
- List of number-one adult contemporary singles of 1974 (U.S.)
