= Just You 'n' Me =

"Just You 'N' Me"

Single by Chicago

from the album Chicago VI
- B-side: "Critic's Choice"
- Released: September 7, 1973
- Recorded: 1973
- Genre: Rock, blue-eyed soul
- Length: 3:42
- Label: Columbia
- Songwriter: James Pankow
- Producer: James William Guercio

Chicago singles chronology
| "Feelin' Stronger Every Day" (1973) | "Just You 'N' Me" (1973) | "(I've Been) Searchin' So Long" (1974) |

"Just You 'n' Me" is a song written by James Pankow for the group Chicago and recorded for their fifth studio album Chicago VI (1973). The lead vocals are sung by bassist Peter Cetera.

== Background ==
The second single released from that album, it was more successful than the first single, "Feelin' Stronger Every Day", reaching No. 4 on the U.S. Billboard Hot 100 and No. 1 on the Cash Box Top 100. Walter Parazaider plays a soprano saxophone solo during the instrumental section while guitarist Terry Kath uses a wah-wah pedal and phase shifter on his guitar. "Just You 'n' Me" was written after a fight between Pankow and his future wife Karen:

"We had had a huge fight, it was a nasty lovers' quarrel, if you will. She locked herself in the bathroom and wouldn't come out...'Just You 'n' Me' poured out of me in its entirety. Usually when I write songs I come up with an idea for a chorus or a hook and fill in the blanks in stages. This was a moment of clarity I've never experienced before or after. It remains a special event in my songwriting experience".

Billboard called it one of Chicago's "best singles ever," with a "heartfelt and mature" love lyric. Record World called it a "James Pankow tune that's done in typical Chicago fashion." In 2019, Bobby Olivier, writing for Billboard, judged the song to be the group's "greatest love song, hard stop."

"Just You 'n' Me" was the final song played by Chicago AM radio station WLS before switching to a talk radio format in 1989.

== Personnel ==
- Peter Cetera — bass, lead vocals
- Robert Lamm — keyboards, backing vocals
- Terry Kath — guitar, backing vocals
- Danny Seraphine — drums
- James Pankow — trombone
- Lee Loughnane — trumpet
- Walter Parazaider — soprano saxophone

== Charts ==
=== Weekly charts ===
| Chart (1973–74) | Peak position |
|---|---|
| Australia (Kent Music Report) | 23 |
| Canada RPM Top Singles | 3 |
| US Billboard Hot 100 | 4 |
| US Billboard Easy Listening | 7 |
| US Cash Box Top 100 | 1 |

=== Year-end charts ===
| Chart (1973) | Rank |
|---|---|
| Canada | 49 |
| US Cash Box Top 100 | 62 |

== Certifications ==
| Region | Certification | Certified units/sales |
|---|---|---|
| United States (RIAA) | Gold | 1,000,000^{^} |
^{^} Shipments figures based on certification alone.
