= Chicago VI =

Studio album by Chicago
- Released: June 25, 1973
- Recorded: February 1973
- Studios: Caribou Ranch, Nederland, Colorado
- Genres: Jazz rock; progressive rock
- Length: 38:21
- Label: Columbia
- Producer: James William Guercio

Chicago chronology
Chicago V (1972)	Chicago VI (1973)	Chicago VII (1974)

Singles from Chicago VI
- 1. "Feelin' Stronger Every Day" Released: June 5, 1973; 2. "Just You 'n' Me" Released: September 7, 1973

Professional ratings
Review scores
Source	Rating
AllMusic	4/5 stars
Christgau's Record Guide	C
Rolling Stone	(not rated)

Chicago VI is the fifth studio album by American rock band Chicago and was released on June 25, 1973, by Columbia Records. It was the band's second in a string of five consecutive albums to make it to No. 1 in the US, was certified gold less than a month after its release, and has been certified two-times platinum since. It is the first album to feature percussionist Laudir de Oliveira, who would become a full-fledged member of the band for Chicago VIII. VI is the first studio album (the other being 1975's compilation Chicago IX) to feature the original band members on the cover before the death of leader and co-founder Terry Kath.

== Background ==
After having recorded all of Chicago's first five albums in New York City (except for parts of the second album, which were recorded at CBS in Los Angeles), producer James William Guercio had his own Caribou Studios built in Nederland, Colorado during 1972. It was finished in time for the band to record their sixth album the following February, and would remain their recording base for the next four years.

Robert Lamm authored half of the album's tracks, including his response to some of Chicago's negative reviewers in "Critics' Choice". James Pankow wrote the album's two hits, "Just You 'n' Me", which peaked at No. 4 on the Billboard Hot 100 chart, and "Feelin' Stronger Every Day", which peaked at No. 10. The latter was co-composed with Peter Cetera, who also wrote "In Terms of Two", and sang lead vocal on all three songs.

Released in June 1973, Chicago VI was another commercial success, spending five non-consecutive weeks at No. 1 on the Billboard 200 chart in the US, and was certified gold by the Recording Industry Association of America (RIAA) less than a month after its release. It was certified two-times platinum in 1986, the first year the RIAA awarded platinum certification to albums released before 1976. The album did not chart in the UK, although the band's first three studio albums had charted in the top ten there.

The album was mixed and released in both stereo and quadraphonic. The original US CD release (Columbia CK #32400) was mastered for CD by Joe Gastwirt. Chicago VI was remastered and reissued by Rhino Records in 2002, with two bonus tracks: a Terry Kath demo called "Beyond All Our Sorrows", and a recording of Al Green's "Tired of Being Alone", taken from the 1973 TV special Chicago in the Rockies. In 2013, the audiophile reissue company Mobile Fidelity Sound Lab remastered Chicago VI and released it on Hybrid SACD, which can be played on both CD players and SACD players.

== Track listing ==
Side one
No.	Title	Writer(s)	Lead vocals	Length
1.	"Critics' Choice"	Robert Lamm	Lamm	2:49
2.	"Just You 'n' Me"	James Pankow	Peter Cetera	3:42
3.	"Darlin' Dear"	Lamm	Lamm	2:56
4.	"Jenny"	Terry Kath	Kath	3:31
5.	"What's This World Comin' To"	Pankow	Lamm, Cetera, Kath	4:58

Side two
No.	Title	Writer(s)	Lead vocals	Length
6.	"Something in This City Changes People"	Lamm	Kath, Lamm, Cetera, Lee Loughnane	3:42
7.	"Hollywood"	Lamm	Lamm	3:52
8.	"In Terms of Two"	Cetera	Cetera	3:29
9.	"Rediscovery"	Lamm	Lamm	4:47
10.	"Feelin' Stronger Every Day"	Cetera, Pankow	Cetera	4:15

2002 reissue bonus tracks
No.	Title	Writer(s)	Lead vocals	Length
1.	"Beyond All Our Sorrows" (Terry Kath demo)	Kath	Kath	7:06
2.	"Tired of Being Alone" (with Al Green)	Green	Green	4:09

== Personnel ==
=== Chicago ===
- Peter Cetera – bass, lead vocals, backing vocals, harmonica on "In Terms of Two"
- Terry Kath – electric, acoustic and slide guitars, lead vocals, backing vocals
- Robert Lamm – acoustic piano, Hammond organ, clavinet, Wurlitzer electric piano, Fender Rhodes, ARP synthesizer, Hohner Pianet, lead vocals, backing vocals
- Lee Loughnane – trumpet, backing vocals, percussion, co-lead vocals on "Something in This City Changes People"
- James Pankow – trombone, brass arrangements
- Walter Parazaider – saxophones, flute
- Danny Seraphine – drums, percussion

=== Additional personnel ===
- Laudir de Oliveira – congas
- Joe Lala – congas
- J. G. O'Rafferty – pedal steel guitar

== Production ==
- Produced by James William Guercio
- Engineered by Wayne Tarnowski
- Assistant Engineer – Jeff Guercio
- Mixed by Phil Ramone
- Mix Assistant – Richard Blakin
- Cover Design – John Berg and Nick Fasciano
- Photography by Barry Feinstein

== Charts ==
Chart (1973–1974)	Position
Australian Albums (Kent Music Report)	12
Canada Top Albums/CDs (RPM)	3
Finnish Albums (The Official Finnish Charts)	26
Italian Albums (Musica e Dischi)	22
Japanese Albums (Oricon)	18
Norwegian Albums (VG-lista)	13
US Billboard 200	1

== Certifications ==
Region	Certification	Certified units/sales
Canada (Music Canada)	Platinum	100,000^{^}
United States (RIAA)	2× Platinum	2,000,000^{^}
^{^} Shipments figures based on certification alone.
