= Chicago XXV: The Christmas Album =

1998 studio album by Chicago

Studio album by Chicago
- Released: August 25, 1998
- Recorded: 1998
- Genre: Rock; Christmas
- Length: 50:50
- Label: Chicago Records
- Producer: Roy Bittan

Chicago chronology
The Heart of Chicago 1967–1998 Volume II (1998)	Chicago XXV: The Christmas Album (1998)	Chicago XXVI: Live in Concert (1999)

Professional ratings
Review scores
Source	Rating
AllMusic	4/5 stars

What's It Gonna Be, Santa?

Studio album by Chicago
- Released: October 14, 2003
- Recorded: 1998 and 2003
- Genre: Rock, Adult contemporary
- Length: 74:33
- Label: Rhino
- Producer: Roy Bittan (1998 tracks) and Phil Ramone (2003 tracks)

Professional ratings
Review scores
Source	Rating
AllMusic	4/5 stars

Chicago 25: The Christmas Album is the nineteenth studio album by the American band Chicago, their twenty-fifth overall, released in 1998 on the band's Chicago Records label. It is an album of Christmas songs. The album was re-issued by Rhino Records in 2003 as What's It Gonna Be, Santa? with six additional, newly recorded tracks.

Produced by Roy Bittan, the original album – featuring Chicago's interpretations of well-known Christmas classics plus one original tune (co-penned by Lee Loughnane) – was very well received upon its release in August 1998, peaking at #47 in the US and going gold during a stay of 7 weeks on the charts. After Chicago entered into a long-term partnership with Rhino Records in 2002, that label re-issued Chicago XXV: The Christmas Album that same year. It was further decided to record six additional Christmas songs – with Hot Streets and Chicago 13 producer Phil Ramone – and re-issue the whole package in 2003 under a new design, title and sequencing, entitled What's It Gonna Be, Santa?, deleting its predecessor in the process. Guitarist Keith Howland sang his first lead vocal on the track, "Jolly Old Saint Nicholas". This later release reached #102 in the US during a stay of 5 weeks on the charts.

== Track listings ==
=== Chicago 25: The Christmas Album ===
No.	Title	Writer(s)	Vocals	Length
1.	"Little Drummer Boy"	Katherine Davis, Henry Onorati, Harry Simeone	Champlin/Scheff	4:05
2.	"God Rest Ye Merry Gentlemen"	Traditional	Scheff	3:23
3.	"Have Yourself a Merry Little Christmas"	Hugh Martin, Ralph Blane	Champlin and Scheff	4:02
4.	"The Christmas Song"	Mel Tormé, Robert Wells	Robert Lamm	3:39
5.	"O Come All Ye Faithful"	Traditional	Scheff	4:46
6.	"Child's Prayer"	Lee Loughnane, John Durrill	Children's choir, with Scheff	3:24
7.	"Feliz Navidad"	José Feliciano	Lamm	4:17
8.	"Santa Claus Is Coming to Town"	Fred Coots, Haven Gillespie	Champlin/Scheff	3:56
9.	"Christmas Time Is Here"	Vince Guaraldi, Lee Mendelson	Lamm	3:49
10.	"Let It Snow! Let It Snow! Let It Snow!"	Sammy Cahn, Jule Styne	Loughnane	3:29
11.	"What Child Is This?"	Traditional, William Chatterton Dix	Scheff/Champlin	4:41
12.	"White Christmas"	Irving Berlin	Lamm	2:28
13.	"Silent Night"	Franz Xaver Gruber, Joseph Mohr	Scheff	3:18
14.	"One Little Candle"	George Mysels, J. Maloy Roach	Children's choir	1:26

=== What's It Gonna Be, Santa? ===
No.	Title	Writer(s)	Vocals	Length
1.	"Winter Wonderland"	Felix Bernard, Dick Smith	Lamm	4:19
2.	"Let It Snow! Let It Snow! Let It Snow!"	Cahn, Styne	Loughnane	3:29
3.	"Jolly Old Saint Nicholas"	Benjamin Hanby	Keith Howland	3:35
4.	"The Little Drummer Boy"	Davis, Onorati, Simeone	Champlin and Scheff	3:29
5.	"This Christmas"	Donny Hathaway, Nadine McKinnor	Scheff	4:03
6.	"Feliz Navidad"	Feliciano	Lamm	4:17
7.	"Bethlehem"	Bill Champlin, Tamara Champlin	Loughnane, Scheff, with Champlin	4:07
8.	"The Christmas Song"	Tormé, Wells	Lamm	3:39
9.	"O Come All Ye Faithful"	Traditional	Scheff	4:46
10.	"Rudolph the Red-Nosed Reindeer"	Johnny Marks	Champlin	3:44
11.	"Have Yourself a Merry Little Christmas"	Martin, Blane	Champlin	4:02
12.	"Sleigh Ride"	Leroy Anderson, Mitchell Parish	Loughnane with Scheff	3:55
13.	"Silent Night"	Gruber, Mohr	Scheff	3:18
14.	"What Child Is This?"	Traditional, Chatterton Dix	Champlin	4:41
15.	"Christmas Time Is Here"	Guaraldi, Mendelson	Lamm	3:49
16.	"God Rest Ye Merry Gentlemen"	Traditional	Scheff	3:23
17.	"Santa Claus Is Coming to Town"	Coots, Gillespie	Champlin	3:56
18.	"Child's Prayer"	Loughnane, Durrill	Children's choir, with Scheff	3:24
19.	"One Little Candle"	Mysels, Roach	Children's choir	1:26
20.	"White Christmas"	Berlin	Lamm	2:28

(New additions in italic)

== Personnel ==
=== Chicago ===
- Bill Champlin – organ (1, 2, 4, 5, 8, 10, 14–17, 20), backing vocals (1–3, 6–14, 16, 18, 20), arrangements (1, 4, 7, 14, 17), BGV arrangements (1, 2, 6–14, 16, 20), lead vocals (4, 7, 10, 11, 14), synth keyboards (4), synth vibes (6), acoustic guitar (7), brass arrangements (7, 14), acoustic piano (10), electric piano (14, 17), computer programming (14, 17), all vocals (17), guitars (17), synth bass (17), vocal arrangements (17)
- Keith Howland – guitars (1–3, 5–8, 10–12, 14–16, 20), lead vocals (3), backing vocals (3), arrangements (3, 11), BGV arrangements (3), keyboards (11)
- Tris Imboden – drums (1–8, 10–12, 14–18, 20), arrangements (3)
- Robert Lamm – lead vocals (1, 6, 8, 15, 20), acoustic piano (1–3, 5, 7, 8, 10, 12), arrangements (1, 6, 8, 15, 20), brass arrangements (1, 8, 15), vibraphone (5), electric piano (6, 15, 16), backing vocals (3), clavinet (10)
- Lee Loughnane – trumpet (1–5, 7, 8, 10–13, 16–18, 20), flugelhorn (1, 6, 13–15, 18), lead vocals (2, 7, 12), arrangements (2, 7, 12, 16, 18), backing vocals (3, 18), muted trumpet (14), brass arrangements (17, 18), piccolo trumpet (18), BGV arrangements (18)
- James Pankow – trombone (1–8, 10–18, 20), brass arrangements (2–6, 8, 10–18, 20), synth keyboards (4), flute arrangements (9), arrangements (10, 13, 16, 19), vocal arrangements (19)
- Walter Parazaider – tenor saxophone (1–6, 8, 10–18, 20), alto flute (1, 9), alto saxophone (6, 7, 13, 14, 16), flute (6, 7, 13, 14, 16), C flute (9)
- Jason Scheff – bass (1–3, 5, 7–9, 12, 16), backing vocals (1–3, 6–14, 16, 18, 20), lead vocals (4, 5, 7, 9, 12, 13, 16), electric upright bass (4, 6, 15, 18, 20), keyboards (9), computer programming (9), arrangements (9), BGV arrangements (9, 10, 13), fretless bass (11, 14), electric bass (17)

=== Additional musicians ===
- Roy Bittan – organ (4, 10, 18), accordion (4, 6, 18), keyboards (13), synth bells (18), acoustic piano (19)
- George Black – computer programming (9, 13, 18, 19)
- John Durill – synth keyboard (18), additional arrangements (19)
- Tim Pierce – guitars (4, 11), acoustic guitars (9, 19)
- Luis Conte – percussion (4, 6, 8, 9, 16, 20)
- Larry Klimas – baritone saxophone (3, 10)
- Nick Lane – additional arrangements (1)
- Carmen Twillie – backing vocals (6, 11, 20)

Adult choir on "The Little Drummer Boy"

- Carmen Twillie – choir director
- Alex Brown, Tamara Champlin, Alvin Chea, Gia Ciambotti, H.K. Dorsey, Gary Falcone, Edie Lehmann Boddicker, Bobbie Page, Oren Waters, Maxine Waters and Mona Lisa Young – choir

Children's choir on "Child's Prayer" and "One Little Candle"

- Ryan Kelly – children's choir conductor
- Amity Addrisi, Michael Amezcua, Alex Bittan, Ryan Bittan, Clark Gable, Kayley Gable, Kate Lamm, Sean Lamm, Dylan Loughnane, River Loughnane, Sarah Pankow, Brittany Scott and Jade Thacker – lead vocals

== Production ==
Chicago XXV

- Produced by Roy Bittan
- Engineered and Mixed by Ed Thacker
- Assisted by Posie Muliadi and Eric Ferguson
- Recorded at A&M Studios (Hollywood, CA); Rumbo Recorders (Canoga Park, CA); Gold Mine Studio (Woodland Hills, CA).
- Mixed at A&M Studios
- Production Coordinator – Valerie Pack
- Art Direction and Design – John Kosh

"What's It Gonna Be, Santa?"

- Produced by Phil Ramone
- Engineered and Mixed by Ed Thacker at Glenwood Place Recording Studios (Burbank, CA).
- Additional Production – Chicago and David McLees
- Sound Supervision – Lee Loughnane and Jeff Magid
- Remastered by David Donnelly at DNA Mastering (Studio City, CA).
- Product Manager – Mike Engstrom
- Discographical Annotation – Gary Peterson
- Editorial Supervision – Cory Fry
- Project Assistants – Jimmy Edwards and Tim Scanlin
- Art Direction – Hugh Brown and Linda Cobb
- Front Cover Photo – Corbis Images
- Additional Photography – Getty Images

== Charts ==
Chart (1998)	Peak position
US Billboard 200	47

== Certifications ==
Region	Certification	Certified units/sales
United States (RIAA)	Gold	500,000^{^}
United States (RIAA) Reissue	Gold	500,000^{‡}
^{^} Shipments figures based on certification alone.^{‡} Sales+streaming figures based on certification alone.
