= Caribou Ranch =

Former recording studio in Boulder County, Colorado

Coordinates: 39.9971°N 105.5142°W

Caribou Ranch was a recording studio built by producer James William Guercio in 1972 in a converted barn on ranch property in the Rocky Mountains near Nederland, Colorado, on the road that leads to the ghost town of Caribou. The studio was in operation until it was damaged in a fire in March 1985. The ranch hosted some of the most prominent acts of the 1970s and 80s and was closely associated with the band Chicago, who recorded five consecutive albums there between 1973 and 1977.

== History ==
In 1971, Guercio purchased Caribou Ranch, comprising more than 4,000 acres (1,600 ha) of ranch property in the Rocky Mountains. The next year, Joe Walsh and Bill Szymczyk were starting work on Barnstorm at Walsh's home in Colorado when a mixer blew out on the first day. Szymczyk knew Guercio was building a new studio, visited the in-progress barn conversion at the ranch, and concluded that it would work for their project. They used the new studio to finish Barnstorm. Szymczyk next made Rick Derringer's All American Boy and the hit single "Rock & Roll, Hoochie Koo" there.

Elton John's 1974 album Caribou was recorded at and named after the studio. John also recorded the single "Lucy in the Sky with Diamonds" there, along with its b-side, the John Lennon-penned "One Day (At A Time)," and the basic tracks and vocals for the single "Philadelphia Freedom" (the orchestral parts for which were overdubbed later). He also recorded his next two albums, Captain Fantastic and the Brown Dirt Cowboy and Rock of the Westies at Caribou Ranch.

Simultaneously in 1974 The Beach Boys attempted to record new material for their first studio album since Holland two years prior. The recordings were not very successful, but some songs such as "Good Timin'" saw later release. Many other songs were demoed but have not yet seen official release. Beach Boys members Carl Wilson and Bruce Johnston sang backing vocals in support of Elton John's "Don't Let the Sun Go Down on Me" during this time.

The group Chicago, managed by Guercio, recorded five studio albums there: Chicago VI, Chicago VII, Chicago VIII, Chicago X, and Chicago XI. Earth, Wind, & Fire recorded two of their albums there as well; 1974's Open Our Eyes (Produced by Maurice White & Joe Wissert) and the 1975 Grammy winning That's the Way of the World (Produced by White and Charles Stepney).

In 1978, Guercio co-owned a club in the North American Soccer League called the Colorado Caribous, which played their home games in Mile High Stadium in Denver. The team performed badly both on the field and at the box office and lasted just one season before shifting to Atlanta. (The squad is best remembered today for their unusual uniforms, which included a strip of leather fringe across the chest.)

By the mid 1980s, it was rumored that business was slow for the studio and their rates had dropped. In March 1985 Amy Grant, who had recorded four albums there, including her platinum-certified mainstream breakthrough album Unguarded, was about to fly out of Nashville to return to Caribou for work on her next project when word reached her that the studio was in flames.

The studio complex was shut down and never used again after the 1985 fire destroyed the control room and caused about US$3 million in damage. According to the Nederland Fire Chief, while the fire department was doing overhaul on the fire to make sure it was out, a chain saw cutting through the studio wall damaged several Gold Record plaques that had been awarded to Guercio's group Chicago.

Guercio's interests had shifted away from music and on transactions in 1996 and 2001 he sold 2,180 acres (880 ha) of the ranch to Boulder County and the City of Boulder, and another 1,489 acres (603 ha) were placed under conservation easement. A housing development by Guercio's Caribou Companies takes up much of the remaining land.

In a 2008 interview with Denver PBS series Studio 12, Guercio said the studio's control room was rebuilt after the fire. (Note: Only the roof and structure of the control room were repaired; the actual room itself was not. The part of the studio where the musicians performed remained intact.) Guercio added, however, that he has no plans to reopen the recording facility for business.

In 2009, the Neve 8016 mixing console from the recording studio was refurbished by Vintage King Audio and purchased by Prime Studio in Austria.

The remaining 1,600-acre (650 ha) property was sold to Indian Peaks Holdings LLC for $32.5 million.

In January 2015, the remaining Rock 'n' Roll memorabilia was auctioned in Denver. Over $800,000 was raised from more than 1500 bidders. Items sold included:

- A baby grand piano, used by Elton John, Véronique Sanson, Frank Zappa and Michael Jackson, sold for $52,500
- A Hammond organ and Leslie speakers, used by Chicago, Earth, Wind & Fire, Stephen Stills, Rod Stewart, and others, sold for $11,250
- President Grover Cleveland's bed, used by many artists including Elton John, Michael Jackson, and Jerry Lee Lewis, sold for $11,250
- A 1985 black Corvette with custom 'CARIBU' plates, which was often used by celebrities visiting Caribou Ranch. Val Kilmer drove the Corvette during his run in Hamlet at the Colorado Shakespeare Festival in 1988. The Corvette sold for $10,625
- A Victorian horn chair from the Recording Studio Game Room sold for $2,215

In August of 2024 the ranch was listed for sale for $48.5 million. The Wall Street Journal linked the Walton family as the sellers.

== Artists ==
Over 150 artists recorded at Caribou. Notable acts included the following.

- Al Di Meola
- Ali Thomson
- America
- Amy Grant, starting with Age to Age and ending with Unguarded
- Badfinger
- Barnstorm
- The Beach Boys
- Billy Joe Shaver
- Billy Joel
- Blood, Sweat & Tears
- Bruce Roberts
- Bullett
- Carl Wilson
- Carole King
- Chicago, starting with Chicago VI and ending with Chicago XI
- Chick Corea
- Crawler (band) - 1978's Snake, Rattle & Roll (Epic)
- Dan Fogelberg
- David Cassidy
- David Sancious
- Deep Purple
- Dennis Wilson
- Dio
- Earth, Wind & Fire (albums Open Our Eyes and That's the Way of the World)
- Eddie Rabbitt
- Elton John
- Emerson, Lake & Palmer
- Frank Zappa
- George Duke
- Gerard
- Jan Hammer
- Jeff Beck
- Jerry Goodman
- Jerry Lee Lewis
- Jessi Colter
- Joni Mitchell
- Joe Walsh
- John Denver
- John Lennon (contributed to Elton John recording sessions)
- Kris Kristofferson
- Lake
- Michael Jackson
- Michael Martin Murphey
- Mike Brewer
- Nitty Gritty Dirt Band
- Ozark Mountain Daredevils
- Peter Frampton
- Phil Collins
- Return to Forever for their albums Romantic Warrior and Musicmagic
- Rick Derringer
- Robert Lamm
- Rod Stewart
- Sailor
- Sheena Easton
- Shooting Star
- Sons of Champlin
- Souther Hillman Furay Band
- Steely Dan
- Stephen Stills
- Stevie Nicks
- Stevie Wonder
- Supertramp
- Switch on their Reaching for Tomorrow album
- Tom Petty
- Tom Scott and The L.A. Express
- Tony Orlando
- Tony Williams
- U2
- Véronique Sanson
- War
- Waylon Jennings
