= Feelin' Stronger Every Day =

Single by Chicago

from the album Chicago VI
- B-side: "Jenny"
- Released: June 5, 1973
- Recorded: 1973
- Genre: Rock
- Length: 4:15
- Label: Columbia
- Songwriters: Peter Cetera, James Pankow
- Producer: James William Guercio

Chicago singles chronology
"Dialogue (Part I & II)" (1972)	"Feelin' Stronger Every Day" (1973)	"Just You 'n' Me" (1973)

"Feelin' Stronger Every Day" is a song written by Peter Cetera and James Pankow for the group Chicago and recorded for their album Chicago VI (1973). The first single released from that album, it reached #10 on the U.S. Billboard Hot 100.

== Development ==
The song was a collaboration between bassist Peter Cetera and trombonist James Pankow. Regarding the composition, drummer Danny Seraphine said, "Peter wrote that song about his marriage falling apart. He'd gone through a real hard time and was starting to feel stronger again."

Cetera himself recalled, "I can remember the exact beginnings of that one... We were at the Akron Rubber Bowl in Akron, Ohio, an outdoor gig that was delayed a bit because of rain, and so, we got there our normal hour and a half before the gig, and we're sitting around, and we were told we're gonna hold for at least an hour, and I heard Jimmy [Pankow] in the other room playing the actual beginning of that song... and I said, 'What is that?' and he went, 'Oh, I don't know, I'm just messing around.'... I went and got my bass, and we sat there and played around with it, and a few weeks later, after we got off the road, I went to his house, and we wrote 'Feelin' Stronger Every Day'."

Pankow noted that "'Feelin' Stronger Every Day' was about a relationship but yet, underlying that relationship it's almost like the band is feeling stronger than ever.”

Cetera played bass and sang lead vocals, while keyboardist Robert Lamm played Hohner Pianet as well as acoustic piano.

== Reception ==
Cash Box said that with this song "Chicago undergoes a slight change in musical directions by straying somewhat away from the sharp horn lines that have so successfully represented their sound in the past." Record World said that the "band have outdone themselves on this number produced superbly by Jim Guercio" and that the "last half of the record takes off into the ionosphere."

== Personnel ==
- Peter Cetera – lead vocals, bass
- Robert Lamm – acoustic piano, backing vocals, Hohner Pianet
- Terry Kath – electric guitar, backing vocals
- Danny Seraphine – drums
- James Pankow – trombone
- Lee Loughnane – trumpet
- Walter Parazaider – tenor saxophone

== Chart performance ==
=== Weekly charts ===
Chart (1973)	Peak position
Canada RPM Top Singles	12
US Billboard Hot 100	10
US Cash BoxTop 100	8

=== Year-end charts ===
Chart (1973)	Rank
Canada	91
US Billboard Hot 100	54
US Cash Box Top 100	82
