= Saturday in the Park =

Single by Chicago

from the album Chicago V
- B-side: "Alma Mater"
- Released: July 13, 1972
- Recorded: September 1971
- Genre: Pop rock; jazz pop
- Length: 3:56
- Label: Columbia
- Songwriter: Robert Lamm
- Producer: James William Guercio

Chicago singles chronology
"Questions 67 and 68" / "I'm a Man" (1971)	"Saturday in the Park" (1972)	"Dialogue (Part I & II)" (1972)

"Saturday in the Park" is a song written by Robert Lamm and recorded by the group Chicago for their 1972 album Chicago V. It was successful upon release, reaching No. 3 on the Billboard Hot 100, and became the band's highest-charting single at the time, helping lift the album to No. 1. Billboard ranked it as the No. 76 song for 1972. The single was certified Gold by the RIAA, selling over 1,000,000 units in the U.S. alone.

== Background ==
According to fellow Chicago member Walter Parazaider, Lamm was inspired to write the song during the recording of Chicago III in New York City on Saturday, July 4, 1970:

Robert came back to the hotel from Central Park very excited after seeing the steel drum players, singers, dancers, and jugglers. I said, 'Man, it's time to put music to this!

However, Lamm recalls the story differently, as he told Billboard magazine:

It was written as I was looking at footage from a film I shot in Central Park, over a couple of years, back in the early ‘70s. I shot this film and somewhere down the line I edited it into some kind of a narrative, and as I watched the film I jotted down some ideas based on what I was seeing and had experienced. And it was really kind of that peace and love thing that happened in Central Park and in many parks all over the world, perhaps on a Saturday, where people just relax and enjoy each other’s presence, and the activities we observe and the feelings we get from feeling a part of a day like that.

In the studio version of the song, the line "singing Italian songs" is followed by "Eh Cumpari" (the title of a song made famous by Julius La Rosa in 1953), and then Italian-sounding nonsense words, rendered in the printed lyrics as "?". Piano, guitar, and vocal sheet music arrangements have often read "improvised Italian lyrics" in parentheses after this line. However, in a film of Chicago performing "Saturday in the Park" at the Arie Crown Theater in Chicago in 1972, Robert Lamm clearly sings, "Eh Cumpari, ci vo sunari," the first line of "Eh, Cumpari!".

== Reception ==
Cash Box said that "The hornrockers paint a scene of inner city greenery that's sure to grow to Top 10 by summer's end." Record World called it "a medium-paced rocker with an appropriately summery feel" and with "crisp, tight instrumental arrangements."

== Chart performance ==
=== Weekly charts ===
Chart (1972)	Peak position
Australia (KMR)	43
Canada Top Singles (RPM)	2
US Billboard Hot 100	3
US Easy Listening (Billboard)	8
US Cash Box Top 100	3

=== Year-end charts ===
Chart (1972)	Position
Canada Top Singles (RPM)	25
US Billboard Hot 100	76
US Cash Box Top 100	71

== Certifications ==
Region	Certification	Certified units/sales
United States (RIAA)	Gold	1,000,000^{^}
^{^} Shipments figures based on certification alone.

== Personnel ==
- Robert Lamm – lead vocals, piano
- Peter Cetera – lead vocals (chorus), backing vocals, bass guitar
- Terry Kath – lead guitar
- Lee Loughnane – trumpet
- James Pankow – trombone
- Walter Parazaider – alto saxophone
- Danny Seraphine – drums

== See also ==
- "A Roller Skating Jam Named "Saturdays""
- "Prisencolinensinainciusol", a song written by an Italian with nonsense American English-sounding lyrics
