= Laudir de Oliveira =

Brazilian musician (1940–2017)

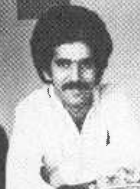
- Laudir de Oliveira in 1977

Background information
- Born: Laudir Soares de Oliveira; 6 January 1940; Rio de Janeiro, Brazil
- Died: 17 September 2017 (aged 77) Rio de Janeiro, Brazil
- Genres: Jazz, bossa nova, samba, rock
- Occupation: Musician
- Instrument: Percussion
- Years active: 1960s—2017
- Formerly of: Chicago, Sergio Mendes & Brasil ‘66

Laudir Soares de Oliveira (6 January 1940 – 17 September 2017) was a Brazilian musician and producer mostly renowned for his time as percussionist with the band Chicago.

== Career ==
De Oliveira grew up in Rio de Janeiro and started working professionally in music in the 1960s, accompanying Brazilian musicians such as Sérgio Mendes and Marcos Valle. In 1968, he moved to the United States. Credited simply as "Laudir", he also appeared on Joe Cocker's 1969 debut album, playing on his hit single "Feelin' Alright".

=== Work with Chicago ===
In 1973, de Oliveira was invited to play with Chicago on the band's sixth album. As Robert Lamm and James Pankow recalled, "Laudir was an incredible percussionist. He was an incredible player. He came out of Sergio Mendes. At first we experimented with using percussion in the studio, and we liked the way the percussion held the tempos together so much that we decided to keep the percussion aspect part of the band. ... Terry Kath in particular felt the need for a percussionist to keep the grooves, the tempo steady". According to Chicago's drummer Danny Seraphine, "[Laudir's style and mine] fit together perfectly, creating a layered and full sound that reinforced the strong Latin influence that had been building in our music".

After playing on the albums Chicago VI and Chicago VII as a sideman, de Oliveira officially joined the band in 1974. The blend of jazz-rock and Brazilian rhythm resulting from his presence would end up defining many of the band's hits, including "(I've Been) Searchin' So Long", "Call on Me", "Old Days" and "If You Leave Me Now". The first album he appeared as an official member was Chicago VIII. Apart from playing percussion, de Oliveira also provided vocals to "You Get It Up" from Chicago X (1976) and co-authored "Life Is What It Is" on Chicago 13 (1979).

Parallel to Chicago, de Oliveira continued to work as a session man. In 1978, he played with The Jacksons on their album Destiny.

During his tenure in Chicago, de Oliveira grew particularly close to guitarist Terry Kath. De Oliveira was the last band member to see Kath alive the night before he died, following a gun-related accident in 1978.

=== Post-Chicago ===
In 1981, as Chicago abandoned their musical roots and became more pop-oriented, de Oliveira was asked to leave the band to make room for Bill Champlin. He spent the next five years in Los Angeles, doing session work for other musicians like Chick Corea, Gal Costa, Airto Moreira, Flora Purim, Carlos Santana, Wayne Shorter and Nina Simone, before relocating to his native Brazil in 1987.

De Oliveira lived in Rio de Janeiro, where he was Cultural Director of the Universidade do Grande Rio. In September 2010, he reunited with Chicago on the occasion of the band's concert at the HSBC Arena in Rio de Janeiro, performing "Happy Man". The event marked the first time any former member of Chicago performed again with the band's new line-up. In April 2016, he appeared as a special guest percussionist alongside former Chicago drummer Danny Seraphine and former Chicago guitarist Donnie Dacus in a performance in New York following Chicago's 2016 induction into the Rock and Roll Hall of Fame.

== Death ==
De Oliveira died of a heart attack on 17 September 2017 at the age of 77 while performing onstage in Rio de Janeiro.
