= Lee Loughnane =

American musician and songwriter (born 1946)

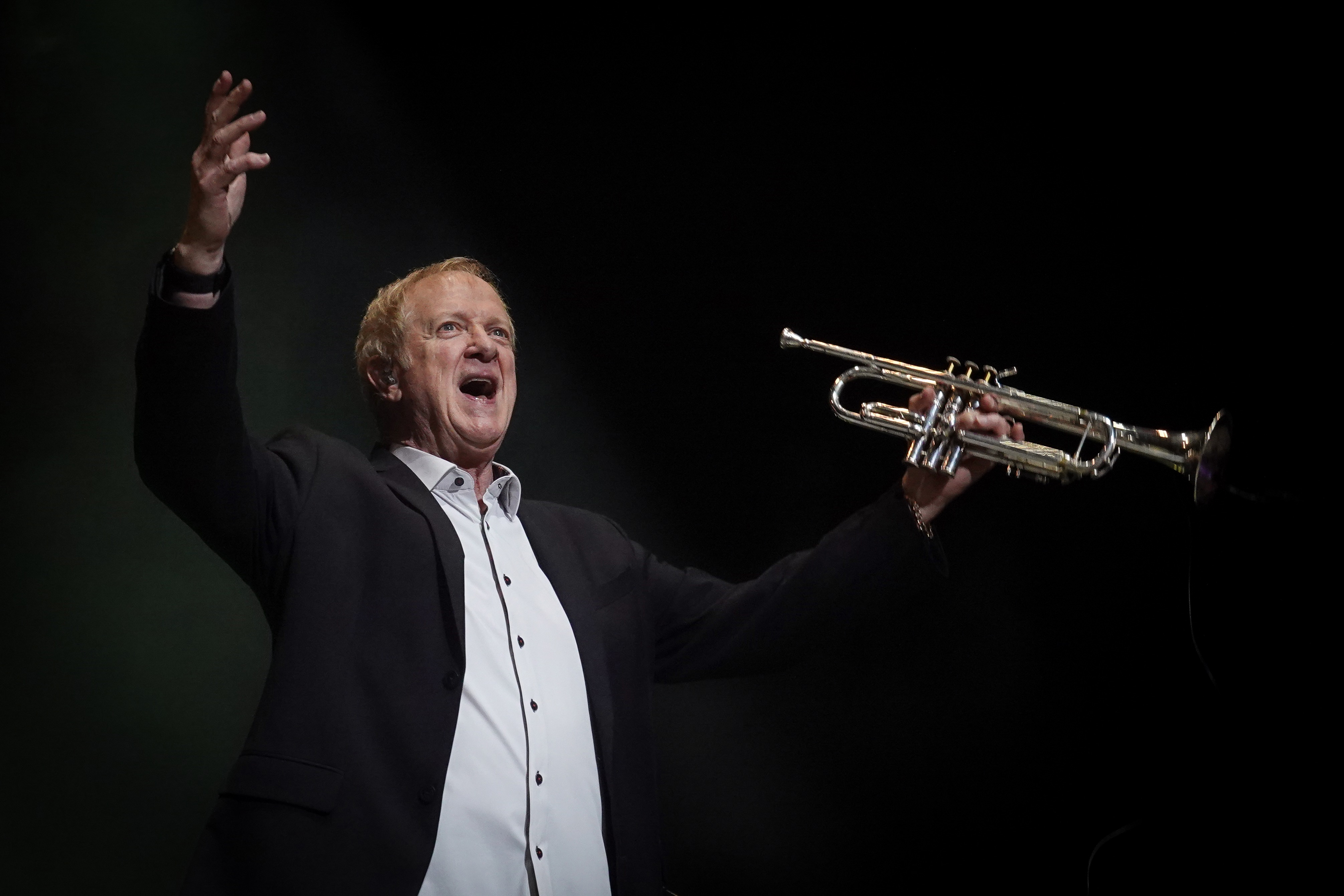
- Loughnane in 2022

Background information
- Born: Lee David Loughnane; October 21, 1946 (age 79); Elmwood Park, Illinois, US
- Genres: Rock, blues, R&B
- Occupation: Musician
- Instruments: Trumpet; flugelhorn; cornet; vocals; keyboards; guitar; bass guitar
- Years active: 1966–present
- Member of: Chicago
- Website: Official Chicago website

Lee David Loughnane (/lɑːkneɪn/ LOCK-nain; born October 21, 1946) is an American musician who is a founding member of the rock band Chicago. He is best known for being one-third of Chicago's brass/woodwind section (alongside James Pankow and Walter Parazaider) as well as a backing and occasional lead vocalist.

== Early life and education ==
Lee David Loughnane was born in Elmwood Park, Illinois, a northwest suburb of Chicago, to Philip and Juanita Loughnane. Lee is the second-oldest of five children. He began playing trumpet at age 11, using the same instrument played by his dad when he was in the Army Air Force. Lee attended St. Mel High School, an all-boys school operated by the Christian Brothers, because it had a concert band, jazz band and marching band. By the time he graduated in 1964, he knew that he wanted to be a professional musician. "There was nothing else that I wanted to do. I had no other calling." He met his future Chicago bandmates during his first year at DePaul University.

== Career ==
Through his friendship with guitarist Terry Kath, Loughnane met drummer Danny Seraphine and saxophone/woodwind player Walter Parazaider. Parazaider, who was trying to form a rock band with horns, encouraged Loughnane to sit in on rehearsals. Loughnane has been a member of Chicago since its inception. At first, the group was known as The Big Thing. Eventually it was renamed The Chicago Transit Authority with the addition of Peter Cetera on vocals and bass. The band was later renamed simply "Chicago."

Loughnane's songwriting contributions to Chicago have included the hit singles "Call on Me" from Chicago VII and "No Tell Lover" from Hot Streets, as well as album cuts such as "Take a Chance" from Hot Streets, "Together Again" on Chicago X, "This Time" on Chicago XI and "America" on Chicago XXXVI: Now. A copy of the latter song, released on July 4, 2014, was sent to every member of Congress. Lee described how he brought his first songwriting effort to the band, which became the Top 10 single "Call on Me", "By the time I came up with an original song the band was very well established with six albums and major success. So I sort of came in with, 'you wanna hear my song,' very timid. I didn't know if they wanted to do it. I didn't think it was good enough. My personality, 'I'm not good enough,' and you know, 'I'm just trying.'"

Loughnane made his lead vocal debut on the Terry Kath composition "Song of The Evergreens" on Chicago VII. He provides background vocals on several Chicago songs, and the occasional lead vocal such as on "Together Again" from Chicago X, "This Time" from Chicago XI, "Let it Snow! Let It Snow! Let It Snow!" from Chicago XXV: The Christmas Album and "It's the Most Wonderful Time of the Year" and "Rockin' and Rollin' on Christmas Day" from Chicago XXXIII: O Christmas Three. In concert, Lee sings "Colour My World."

Aside from his musical contributions to Chicago, Loughnane is reported to be a peacemaker and problem-solver within the band. He handles most of the media interviews and has produced several recent Chicago albums, including Chicago XXXVI: Now which was recorded entirely on the road, using a traveling studio that Loughnane put together with engineer Tim Jessup.

Loughnane had a small speaking role as a pig farmer on a hippie commune in the 1973 film Electra Glide in Blue, starring Robert Blake. Peter Cetera, Terry Kath and Walt Parazaider also appear in the film, which was directed by James Guercio, Chicago's producer at the time. Loughnane played a motorcycle cop in the 1984 music video "Stay The Night" by Chicago. Lee, along with his fellow founding Chicago members Robert Lamm and James Pankow, have a cameo appearance as themselves in the 2013 Larry David comedy Clear History.

Lee Loughnane, Walt Parazaider and Jimmy Pankow play on two tracks of the Bee Gees' album Spirits Having Flown, "Stop (Think Again)" and "Too Much Heaven". On "Too Much Heaven", Lee plays the flugelhorn and Walt plays the flute, according to the liner notes of the 2003 reissue of Hot Streets. In return, the Gibb brothers sang back-up on the Chicago song "Little Miss Lovin'". The bands became friendly when they were both recording at Criteria Studios in Miami.

The Chicago horn section also performed on several tracks of Leon Russell's Americana, most notably Let's Get Started. For this album, Lee co-wrote the horn charts with saxophonist Marty Grebb.

Lee Loughnane is a member of Phi Mu Alpha Sinfonia, and was given the National Citation as well as recognition as Signature Sinfonian along with fellow Chicago members and Sinfonians on August 26, 2009.

Elmwood Park dedicated "Lee Loughnane Way" near his childhood home on Sunset Drive in 2012. Chicago was awarded a Star on the Hollywood Walk of Fame for Recording at 6438 Hollywood Boulevard in Hollywood, California in 1992.

As of 2026, with Robert Lamm and James Pankow not touring due to health issues, Loughnane is the only original member of the band currently performing on stage.
