= Robert Lamm =

American musician (born 1944)

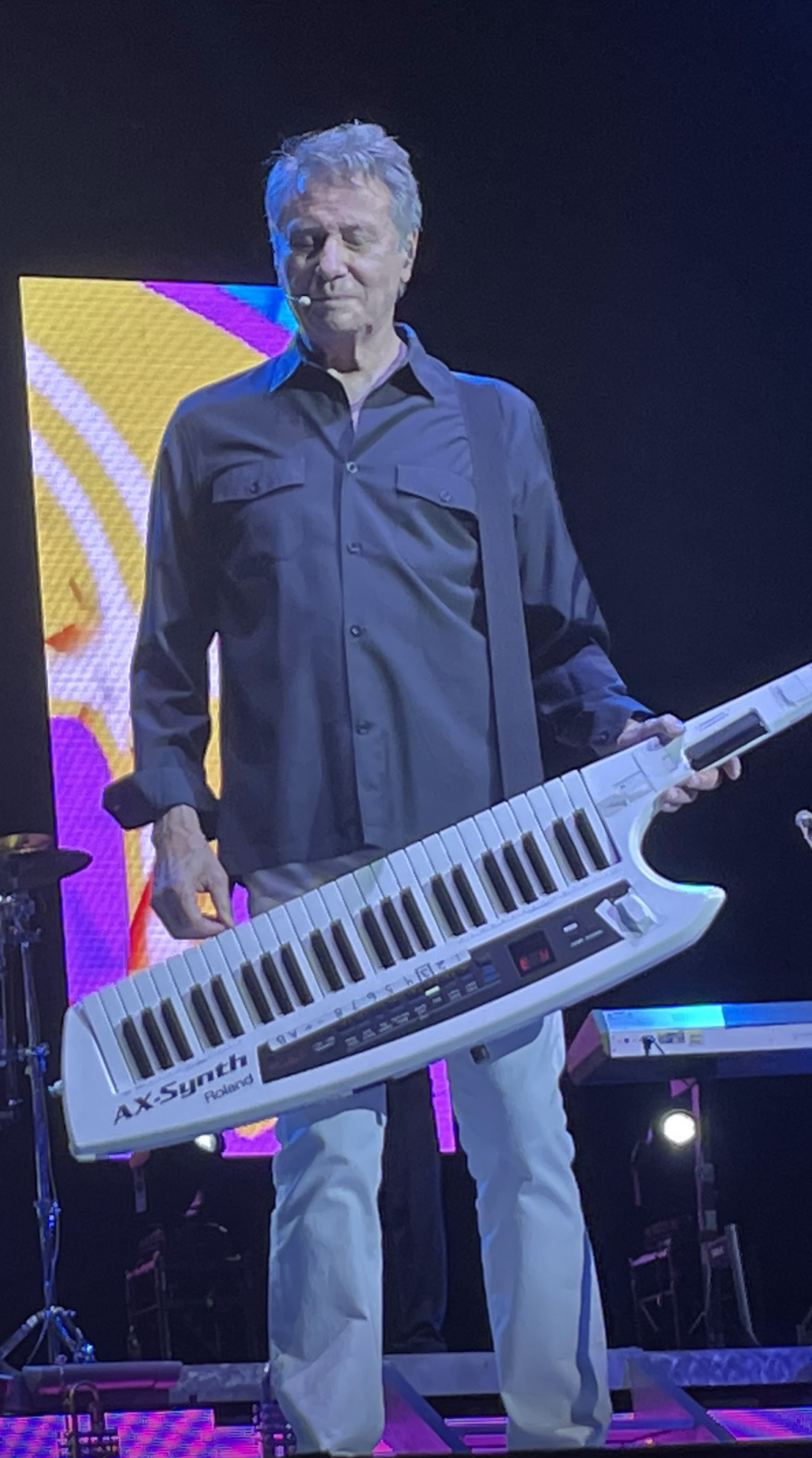
- Lamm performing with Chicago in 2022

Background information
- Born: Robert William Lamm; October 13, 1944 (age 81); Brooklyn, New York, U.S.
- Origin: Chicago, Illinois, U.S.
- Genres: Rock; adult contemporary; jazz fusion
- Occupations: Musician; songwriter
- Instruments: Keyboards; vocals
- Years active: 1967–present
- Label: Blue Infinity
- Member of: Chicago
- Spouses: Karen Perk (m. 1970; div. 1971) Julie Nini (m. 1976; div. 1981) Alex Donnelley (m. 1985; div. 1991) Joy Kopko (m. 1991)
- Website: robertlammsolo.com

Robert William Lamm (born October 13, 1944) is an American musician and a founding member of the rock band Chicago. He is best known for his songwriting, vocals, and keyboard melodies, most significantly on the band's debut studio album, Chicago Transit Authority (1969). Lamm wrote many of the band's biggest hits, including "Questions 67 & 68", "Does Anybody Really Know What Time It Is?", "Beginnings", "25 or 6 to 4", "Saturday in the Park", "Dialogue (Part I & II)" and "Harry Truman".

== Biography ==
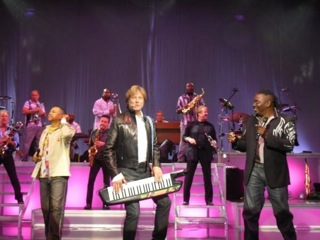
Lamm (center) performing with Earth, Wind & Fire on keytar

Lamm was born on October 13, 1944 in Brooklyn, one of the five New York City boroughs. His parents had a collection of jazz records, which were an early influence on him. As a youth, he performed in the boys' and men's choir at Grace Episcopal Church in Brooklyn Heights. Also in the choir was Harry Chapin. In a 2003 interview, Lamm said, "My first musical training came as a member of that choir. It exposed me to some of the great sacred music from the Middle Ages, right up through Bach and into the 20th century composers."

His mother eventually remarried, resulting in Lamm moving to Chicago, Illinois, when he was 15 years old, Robert joined a group on the south side of Chicago, along with Roland Gomez (drums) and several other guys calling themselves "The Trondells". He studied art in high school, particularly drawing and painting, but changed direction in college by enrolling in the music program at Roosevelt University in Chicago.

In 1967, Lamm was one of the seven founding members of a "rock band with horns"—soon to be known as Chicago. After recording six overwhelmingly successful albums, in 1974, Lamm released Skinny Boy, the only solo album from a member of Chicago before the 1980s. Lamm seemingly drifted into a period of both personal and professional frustration including a bout with drug addiction. He emerged in 1982 with a new attitude.

A number of solo albums began to appear after Lamm relocated back to New York in 1991. He formed a trio (Beckley-Lamm-Wilson) with Gerry Beckley of the band America and Carl Wilson of The Beach Boys. After Wilson's death from lung cancer in February 1998, an album was released titled Like a Brother (2000).

All of these solo albums and songs were in addition to the continued semi-active recordings by Chicago, Stone of Sisyphus, Night and Day, Chicago XXX, and Chicago Now 36.

Lamm has been a guest lecturer on music production at Stanford University. In 2012, he lectured at New York University on the subject of songwriting.

In April 2026, it was confirmed by bandmate Lee Loughnane that Lamm and James Pankow stopped touring with the group in 2025 due to health concerns, but have not retired and remain members of the band.

== Instruments ==
In Chicago's early years, Lamm used a simple setup of Hammond organ and Wurlitzer Electric Piano. After the band's first tour of Europe, he began using a Hohner Pianet. Initially, his use of the grand piano was limited to the studio until he began to use one more regularly on stage, purchasing a Steinway Model D Concert Grand by the early 1970s. The Fender Rhodes electric piano became a favorite around 1972. Around 1973–1974 he added a Mellotron and Hohner clavinet in his keyboard rig, and also incorporated Moog and ARP synthesizers. In the late 1970s, he also started using the Yamaha CS-80 synthesizer and possibly a Sequential Circuits Prophet 5. According to an interview with Keyboard Magazine in 1979, he discovered that he no longer needed the Hammond organ after starting to play the CS80, so he retired it. On a 1980 TV appearance, he played a grand piano with a Multimoog synthesizer above it. He then accessed various synthesizer sound modules via MIDI keyboard controllers such as Yamaha, Kawai, Rhodes, and a Yamaha keytar. Beginning in the late 1980s, he began using the Lync LN1000 keytar. As his primary keyboard, he prefers the Yamaha Motif ES8 keyboard.

== Personal life ==
Lamm was married to the late Karen Lamm Wilson (née Perk) from 1970 to 1971. He married second wife Julie Nini in 1976. They had one daughter, Sacha. They divorced in 1981. Lamm married his third wife, actress Alex Donnelley, in 1985. They had two daughters, Kate and Sean, before divorcing in 1991. He married his fourth wife Joy Kopko in 1991. They have no children.

== Solo discography ==
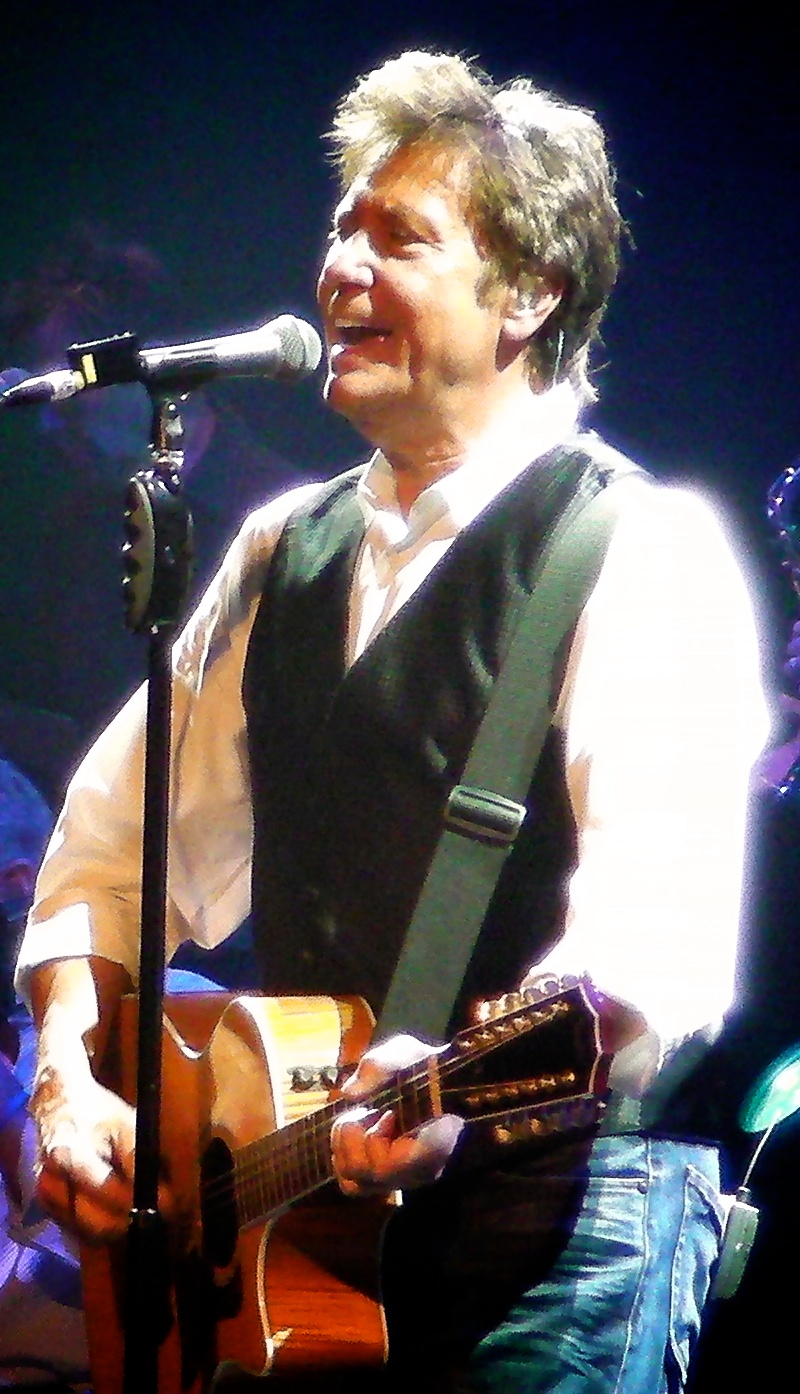
Lamm performing in 2013

- 1974: Skinny Boy
- 1993: Life Is Good in My Neighborhood
- 1999: In My Head
- 2000: Like a Brother (Beckley–Lamm–Wilson)
- 2003: Subtlety & Passion
- 2004: Too Many Voices (expanded reissue of In My Head)
- 2005: Leap of Faith – Live in New Zealand
- 2006: Life Is Good in My Neighborhood 2.0
- 2006: Skinny Boy 2.0
- 2008: The Bossa Project
- 2012: Living Proof
- 2016: This Is Not America (with Les Deux Love Orchestra and America)
- 2012: Robert Lamm Songs: The JVE Remixes
- 2017: Aeroplane (with Les Deux Love Orchestra)
- 2017: Time Chill: A Retrospective
- 2020: I Fall To Pieces (with Les Deux Love Orchestra)
