= Group Portrait =

Greatest hits album by Chicago
- Released: October 1991
- Recorded: 1969–1980
- Genres: Rock; adult contemporary
- Labels: Columbia/Legacy (1991; Original); Chicago Records (Reissue)
- Producers: James William Guercio; Phil Ramone; Chicago; Tom Dowd

Chicago chronology
Twenty 1 (1991)	Group Portrait (1991)	Night & Day: Big Band (1995)

Chicago compilation chronology
Greatest Hits 1982-1989 (1989)	Group Portrait (1991)	The Heart of Chicago 1967-1997 (1997)

Professional ratings
Review scores
Source	Rating
AllMusic	4.5/5 stars

Group Portrait is a compilation album by the American band Chicago, released in 1991 by Columbia Records and Legacy Recordings originally, later reissued on the band's Chicago Records label. It includes hits and album cuts from the band's first fourteen albums along with rare tracks.

Group Portrait bears notable differences from most of the band's other official compilation and live albums including the following: it is not assigned a number in the album title number sequence; its cover art depicts people instead of just a logo art concept; and it includes commentary from band members James Pankow, Robert Lamm, former members Peter Cetera, Walt Parazaider and producer James William Guercio. Unlike the 2003 anthology The Box released later, this collection only covers their tenure with Columbia Records, and does not include Warner Bros. material. Also, only full-length versions of songs are included.

== Recording, production ==
The album consisted of 63 songs on 4 CDs or cassette tapes. According to reviewer Byron Mucklow, no remixing was done for this compilation; the material was digitally remastered from the master tapes. He describes the sound as "clear and punchy".

== Critical reception ==
Rock music critic Bill Wyman wrote a generally dismissive review of Group Portrait, for the Chicago Reader, calling it "an altogether fitting testament to Chicago's hippie self-absorption and dopey excesses." He called Chicago "probably the most unforgivably terrible rock 'n' roll band of the 70s" and said Group Portrait memorialized the band "in suitably monstrous fashion". He goes on to say that Chicago had some "decent" singles, already collected on two greatest-hits albums, and names "Wishing You Were Here" as the group's "most notable performance". In his opinion much of the lesser-known material included on Group Portrait belongs in "the nether reaches of our subconscious."

In The Detroit News and Free Press, on the other hand, Group Portrait was faulted for not including more of Chicago's less popular tracks, saying it only "[dipped] a toenail into the vaults", and calling it "a comprehensive if conservative retrospective." Group Portrait merited five out of a possible eight eighth notes on the paper's rating scale – not essential listening, but recommended for fans of the group.

== Track listing (US) ==
Disc	Track	Title	Length	Original release
1	1	"Introduction"	6:35	Chicago Transit Authority (1969)
1	2	"Does Anybody Really Know What Time It Is?"	4:35	Chicago Transit Authority (1969)
1	3	"Beginnings"	7:55	Chicago Transit Authority (1969)
1	4	"Questions 67 & 68"	5:03	Chicago Transit Authority (1969)
1	5	"Listen"	3:22	Chicago Transit Authority (1969)
1	6	"Poem 58"	8:36	Chicago Transit Authority (1969)
1	7	"I'm a Man"	7:40	Chicago Transit Authority (1969)
1	8	"Make Me Smile"	4:35	Chicago (II) (1970)
1	9	"So Much to Say, So Much to Give"	1:02	Chicago (II) (1970)
1	10	"Anxiety's Moment"	0:57	Chicago (II) (1970)
1	11	"West Virginia Fantasies"	1:33	Chicago (II) (1970)
1	12	"Colour My World"	3:00	Chicago (II) (1970)
1	13	"To Be Free"	1:31	Chicago (II) (1970)
1	14	"Now More Than Ever"	1:10	Chicago (II) (1970)
1	15	"Fancy Colours"	5:10	Chicago (II) (1970)
1	16	"25 or 6 to 4"	4:51	Chicago (II) (1970)
1	17	"Where Do We Go from Here"	2:50	Chicago (II) (1970)
2	1	"Flight 602"	2:45	Chicago III (1971)
2	2	"Free"	2:16	Chicago III (1971)
2	3	"What Else Can I Say"	3:13	Chicago III (1971)
2	4	"Mother"	4:28	Chicago III (1971)
2	5	"Lowdown"	3:35	Chicago III (1971)
2	6	"A Song for Richard and His Friends"	6:22	Chicago at Carnegie Hall (IV) (1971)
2	7	"A Hit by Varèse"	4:51	Chicago V (1972)
2	8	"Saturday in the Park"	3:56	Chicago V (1972)
2	9	"Dialogue Part I"	2:57	Chicago V (1972)
2	10	"Dialogue Part II"	4:12	Chicago V (1972)
2	11	"Alma Mater"	3:52	Chicago V (1972)
2	12	"Feelin' Stronger Every Day"	4:14	Chicago VI (1973)
2	13	"In Terms of Two"	3:30	Chicago VI (1973)
2	14	"Critics' Choice"	2:49	Chicago VI (1973)
2	15	"Just You 'n' Me"	3:43	Chicago VI (1973)
2	16	"Something in This City Changes People"	3:42	Chicago VI (1973)
3	1	"Life Saver"	5:18	Chicago VII (1974)
3	2	"Happy Man"	3:31	Chicago VII (1974)
3	3	"(I've Been) Searchin' So Long"	4:28	Chicago VII (1974)
3	4	"Skinny Boy"	5:12	Chicago VII (1974)
3	5	"Byblos"	6:16	Chicago VII (1974)
3	6	"Wishing You Were Here"	4:33	Chicago VII (1974)
3	7	"Call on Me"	4:01	Chicago VII (1974)
3	8	"Brand New Love Affair, Part I & II"	4:29	Chicago VIII (1975)
3	9	"Harry Truman"	3:01	Chicago VIII (1975)
3	10	"Old Days"	3:29	Chicago VIII (1975)
3	11	"You Are on My Mind"	3:21	Chicago X (1976)
3	12	"If You Leave Me Now"	3:54	Chicago X (1976)
3	13	"Together Again"	3:53	Chicago X (1976)
3	14	"Another Rainy Day in New York City"	3:01	Chicago X (1976)
3	15	"Hope for Love"	3:03	Chicago X (1976)
4	1	"Take Me Back to Chicago"	5:15	Chicago XI (1977)
4	2	"Mississippi Delta City Blues"	4:40	Chicago XI (1977)
4	3	"Baby, What a Big Surprise"	3:05	Chicago XI (1977)
4	4	"Prelude (Little One)"	0:52	Chicago XI (1977)
4	5	"Little One"	5:44	Chicago XI (1977)
4	6	"No Tell Lover"	4:13	Hot Streets (XII) (1978)
4	7	"Closer to You"	4:54	B-side of "Must Have Been Crazy"; recorded during the Hot Streets sessions
4	8	"Gone Long Gone"	3:59	Hot Streets (XII)
4	9	"Alive Again"	4:05	Hot Streets (XII)
4	10	"Must Have Been Crazy"	3:24	Chicago 13 (1979)
4	11	"Doin' Business"	3:25	Previously unreleased (1991); from the rehearsal sessions for Chicago XIV (1980)
4	12	"Song for You"	3:41	Chicago XIV
4	13	"Thunder and Lightning"	3:32	Chicago XIV
4	14	"The American Dream"	3:17	Chicago XIV
4	15	"Beginnings (Live)"	6:15	Chicago at Carnegie Hall (IV)
