= Greatest Hits, Volume II (Chicago album) =

Compilation album by Chicago
- Released: November 23, 1981
- Genre: Rock
- Length: 35:49
- Label: Columbia
- Producers: James William Guercio, Phil Ramone and Chicago

Chicago chronology
Chicago XIV (1980)	Greatest Hits, Volume II (1981)	Chicago 16 (1982)

Professional ratings
Review scores
Source	Rating
AllMusic	4/5 stars

Greatest Hits, Volume II (Also known as Chicago 15 or Chicago XV) is the second greatest hits album by American rock band Chicago, released on November 23, 1981, by Columbia Records.

== Background ==
Following the poor reception of 1980's Chicago XIV, Columbia Records dropped Chicago from its roster and cancelled a lucrative contract that had recently been signed. While the band had begun its association with David Foster and was in the process of building a new identity, Columbia had contractual obligations for a new release. Therefore, the label wanted a sequel to the band's first, and highly successful, hits package which had been 1975's Chicago IX: Chicago's Greatest Hits. This sequel, Volume II, featured bare-bones album artwork consisting of a collage of photos from around the city of Chicago. The album lacked liner notes and was the only Chicago album not to have its own rendition of the band's distinctive logo; a small picture of the logo from the band's second album appears in the center of the collage.

Released in November 1981, Greatest Hits, Volume II primarily sampled material from Chicago VIII through 1978's Hot Streets, after which the hits stopped coming, though it also stretches back to pick up overlooked hits from the era first covered by the original compilation album. Appearing just before Chicago's unexpected career revival with Chicago 16, it reached number 171 in the US.

AllMusic, in its review of the album, awarded it two out of five stars, describing it as a “perfunctory stopgap” released by Columbia to fulfill contractual obligations rather than as a genuine retrospective, and noting that the bare packaging reflected the label’s diminished interest in the band at the time of release. The compilation notably features a single edit of “Questions 67 and 68,” the band’s debut single from 1969, which had been omitted from the original 1975 greatest hits package, as well as an exclusive mix of “Happy Man” that removes the false start present on the original ‘’Chicago VII’’ version.

== Track listing ==
=== Side one ===
1. "Baby, What a Big Surprise" (Peter Cetera) – 3:03
2. "Dialogue (Part II)" (Robert Lamm) – 4:10 – incorrectly listed as "Parts I & II"
3. "No Tell Lover" (Cetera/Lee Loughnane/Danny Seraphine) – 3:47 – single edit
4. "Alive Again" (James Pankow) – 3:32 – single edit
5. "Old Days" (Pankow) – 3:29

=== Side two ===
1. "If You Leave Me Now" (Cetera) – 3:55
2. "Questions 67 and 68" (Lamm) – 3:26 – single edit
3. "Happy Man" (Cetera) – 3:15 – exclusive mix which edits out the false start featured on Chicago VII
4. "Gone Long Gone" (Cetera) – 3:57
5. "Take Me Back to Chicago" (Danny Seraphine/David Wolinski) – 3:00 – single edit

Greatest Hits, Volume II (Columbia 37682) reached #171 in the US during a chart stay of 5 weeks. It did not chart in the UK.

== Personnel ==
- Peter Cetera – electric bass, acoustic guitar, lead and backing vocals
- Terry Kath – acoustic guitar, electric guitar, backing vocals
- Robert Lamm – acoustic piano, keyboards, percussion, lead and backing vocals
- Lee Loughnane – trumpet, flugelhorn, cornet, guitar, percussion, backing vocals
- James Pankow – trombone, percussion
- Walter Parazaider – saxophones, flute, clarinet
- Danny Seraphine – drums, percussion
- Laudir de Oliveira – congas, bongos, Latin percussion
- Donnie Dacus – acoustic guitar, electric guitar, backing vocals

== Charts ==
Chart (1981)	Peak position
US Billboard 200	171
