= Street Player (song) =

1978 song by Rufus & Chaka Khan

Song by Rufus & Chaka Khan

from the album Street Player
- Released: January 17, 1978
- Recorded: 1977
- Length: 4:54
- Label: ABC
- Songwriters: Danny Seraphine; Hawk Wolinski
- Producers: Rufus; Roy Halee

"Street Player"

Single by Chicago

from the album Chicago 13
- B-side: "Window Dreamin'"
- Released: October 1979
- Recorded: 1979
- Genre: Disco; funk
- Length: 9:11 (album version); 8:44 (dance mix); 4:15 (single edit)
- Label: Columbia
- Songwriters: Danny Seraphine; Hawk Wolinski
- Producers: Chicago; Phil Ramone

Chicago singles chronology
"Must Have Been Crazy" (1979)	"Street Player" (1979)	"Thunder and Lightning" (1980)

"Street Player" is a song written by Danny Seraphine and David "Hawk" Wolinski. It was originally recorded by the band Rufus on their 1978 studio album of the same title where it was included as the album's opening track. Seraphine and Wolinski reworked the song with the band Chicago for their album Chicago 13, which was released in 1979. That same year, Columbia Records issued the song as a single on two occasions, first in October under a truncated single edit. The following month, a dance remix of the song was released, which charted on the US Billboard Hot Soul Singles Chart. "Street Player" was the band's last single to feature Donnie Dacus, who was replaced by Chris Pinnick after the Chicago 13 tour.

The song has been sampled by several artists, including the Bucketheads for their 1995 single "The Bomb! (These Sounds Fall into My Mind)", which reached the top twenty in several countries. The horns on "Street Player" were also sampled by Nicola Fasano and Pat Rich on "75, Brazil Street", which was later incorporated into Pitbull's 2009 single, "I Know You Want Me (Calle Ocho)", a top five hit in several countries, including the United States and the United Kingdom.

== Background ==
Danny Seraphine wrote the lyrics to "Street Player" about his upbringing in the city of Chicago. The lyrics chronicle Seraphine's time in street gangs and various bands during his adolescent years. He developed the song further with David "Hawk" Wolinski, who later recorded it with his band Rufus for inclusion on the 1978 album Street Player. While Seraphine was on a European tour with Chicago, he conjured the idea of reworking "Street Player" as a disco song similar to Rod Stewart's "Da Ya Think I'm Sexy?", albeit "with a higher level of musicianship". After Chicago's erstwhile producer Phil Ramone agreed to the idea, the rest of the band recorded the song, with Peter Cetera handling lead vocals. To emulate the rhythmic grooves found on disco records, Seraphine's drum parts were looping.

The song features a trumpet solo from Maynard Ferguson, who invited Seraphine to play on "Rocky II Disco" soon after he recorded his trumpet solo. Commenting on "Street Player", Walter Parazaider called it the band's "answer to disco". He said that the band was "listening to current music and wanted to show how it affected us", adding that "there were parts of disco that we liked." James Pankow characterized "Street Player" as "a relatively intelligent approach to disco."

According to Seraphine, the band's record label was excited when the record label heard the final mix of "Street Player" and insisted on its inclusion for Chicago's next studio album. Seraphine was also convinced that the song would become commercially successful and said that he "was practically practicing my Grammy speech" for "Street Player".

"Street Player" also received a dance mix, which begins with a timbale fill and includes more prominent percussion compared to the album version, particularly with its emphasis on a four on the floor kick drum figure and a louder hi-hat part. A synthesizer overdub not found on the original was also added to the intro. This mix was later included on 2003 expanded remaster of Chicago 13. The twelve-inch single of "Street Player" was among the records burned at the Disco Demolition Night held in Comiskey Park.

Beginning in the 2010s, Chicago began to play "Street Player" in their live sets. In a 2017 interview with the Houston Press, Lamm alluded to the song as "a nod to EDM" when mentioning its inclusion in their setlist.

== Sampling ==
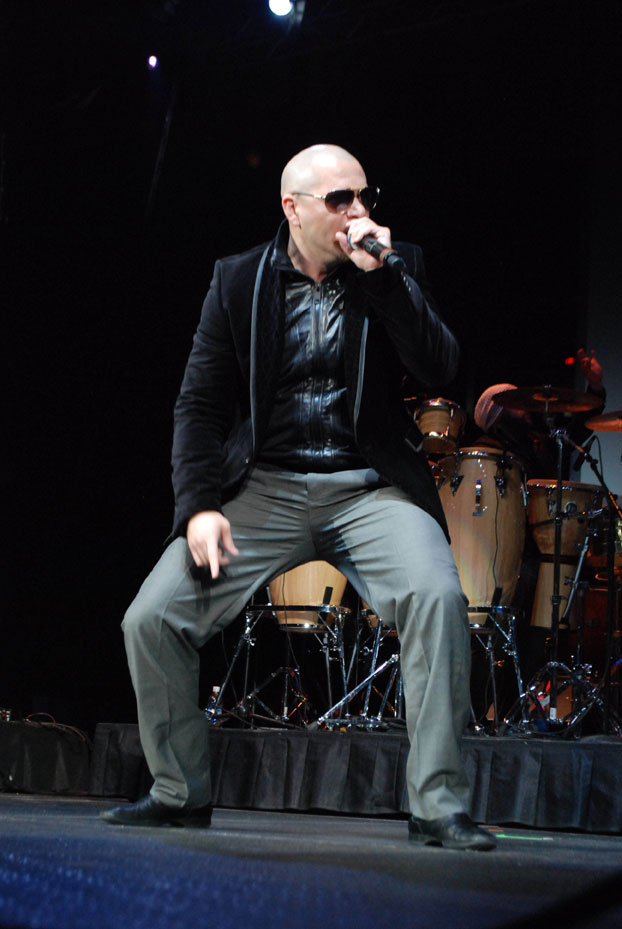
Pitbull was given permission by Seraphine to sample "Street Player" for his song "I Know You Want Me (Calle Ocho)" (pictured in 2009).

In the 1990s, Kenny Dope sampled the horn riff, the drums, and parts of the vocals from "Street Player" for "The Bomb! (These Sounds Fall into My Mind)", which was released as a single by the Bucketheads. Cetera, whose voice was sampled on "The Bomb! (These Sounds Fall into My Mind)", first heard the song at a hair salon in San Bernardino Valley. He commented that he heard "this hi-NRG disco song come on as the guy is cutting my hair and said, 'That's me, I swear that's me." An employee from the hair salon then retrieved for "The Bomb! (These Sounds Fall into My Mind)" from a nearby record store and presented it to Cetera, who quipped "you thought you were cutting old Peter Cetera crooner's head, and you're actually cutting a Buckethead".

Seraphine had received a call from the manager of the Bucketheads, who probed him about licensing the song for fifteen hundred dollars. The manager informed him that Wolinski, the other co-writer of "Street Player", had agreed to these terms and asked Seraphine if he would also approve of the deal. After Seraphine rejected this offer, a different agreement was reached where a third of the royalties were each secured for himself, Wolinski, and Dope. Seraphine later granted permission for Pitbull to sample "Street Player" for his song "I Know You Want Me (Calle Ocho)". The song used segments of the song "75, Brazil Street" by Nicola Fasano & Pat-Rich, which in turn sampled "Street Player". In 2010, Seraphine received the Songwriter of the Year award from ASCAP for his role as a co-writer on "I Know You Want Me (Calle Ocho)".

== Critical reception ==
Cashbox thought that the "Street Player" reflected a return to Chicago's "old horn-dominated sound". They were also complimentary of the song's "jazzy percussives", saying that they were a "highlight". Record World wrote that the song was "bright & spirited with broad appeal" with a "light disco beat" and "joyous horns". Paul Sexton of Record Mirror wrote that the song demonstrated the band's "distinctive" vocal harmonies and brass. He also believed that the song became "well worn out" halfway through its nine minute run-time. In a retrospective review for AllMusic, Lindsey Planer said that "Street Player" "could easily be mistaken for a Village People number."

In 2024, Forbes named "Street Player" the greatest disco song of all time.

== Personnel ==
=== Chicago ===
- Donnie Dacus – guitars
- Peter Cetera – bass, vocals
- Robert Lamm – keyboards
- Danny Seraphine – drums
- Laudir de Oliveira – percussion
- Lee Loughnane – trumpet
- James Pankow – trombone
- Walter Parazaider – saxophone

Additional personnel

- David "Hawk" Wolinski – synthesizer
- Airto Moreira – percussion
- Maynard Ferguson – trumpet solo

== Chart performance ==
Chart (1979)	Peak position
US Hot Soul Singles (Billboard)	91
