= Got Myself Together =

Single by The Bucketheads

from the album All in the Mind
- Released: 5 December 1995 (US); 8 January 1996 (UK & Europe)
- Genre: House
- Length: 5:35 (LP version); 3:35 (Hustlers Convention radio edit)
- Label: Positiva; Henry Street Music; Big Beat
- Songwriters: Gonzalez; Miller; Williamston
- Producer: Kenny "Dope" Gonzalez

The Bucketheads singles chronology
"The Bomb! (These Sounds Fall into My Mind)" (1995)	"Got Myself Together" (1995)	"Time and Space" (1996)

"Got Myself Together" is a song by Kenny Dope's musical production team the Bucketheads, released in late 1995. It was the commercial follow-up to global hit "The Bomb! (These Sounds Fall into My Mind)", and was the third single taken from the project's sole album, All in the Mind (1995).

While unable to reach the worldwide chart highs of its predecessor, the single was a club hit, reaching No. 1 on the US Billboard Hot Dance Club Play chart in January 1996, and a moderate commercial hit, reaching the top 10 in Finland and Sweden, and the top 20 in the UK. The track is considered a 1990s house classic.

== Background ==
"Got Myself Together" is a disco-inspired house track based around a prominent sample of Brass Construction's 1976 hit, "Movin'". In Europe, the lead single version was a remix by British house group Hustlers Convention, an early alias of DJs Michael Gray and Jon Pearn, now known as Full Intention.

In April 2019, Positiva released a new remix by EJECA as part of its 25th anniversary series. The remix gained heavy rotation from the likes of Annie Mac and Danny Howard on BBC Radio 1, and The Black Madonna.

== Critical reception ==
Charles Aaron from Spin said that, in comparison to "The Bomb!", the single "gets knee-deeper in jazzy acid-funk."

== Music video ==
Like its predecessor, the music video for "Got Myself Together" was directed by Guy Ritchie and Alex de Rakoff. The video features a Londoner en route to Heathrow Airport, stopping at sights including Buckingham Palace and Piccadilly Circus, before arriving in New York in search of a disco club.

== Track listings ==
- US CD maxi single
1. "Got Myself Together" (Kenlou mix) - 5:12
2. "Got Myself Together" (Todd Terry club mix) - 5:04
3. "Got Myself Together" (LP version) - 5:35
4. "Got Myself Together" (Nord Solo mix) - 5:14
5. "Time and Space" - 5:20
6. "Sunset" - 5:37
- UK & EU CD maxi single
1. "Got Myself Together" (Hustlers Convention radio edit) - 3:35
2. "Got Myself Together" (Masters at Work edit) - 3:34
3. "Got Myself Together" (Todd Terry mix) - 6:22
4. "Got Myself Together" (Hustlers Convention bass dub) - 4:43
5. "Got Myself Together" (Hustlers Convention club mix) - 6:29
6. "Got Myself Together" (Kenlou mix) - 8:23
7. "Got Myself Together" (Bucket Beats) - 4:34
- UK cassette single
1. "Got Myself Together" (Hustlers Convention radio edit) - 3:35
2. "Got Myself Together" (Masters at Work edit) - 3:34
3. "Got Myself Together" (Todd Terry mix) - 6:22
4. "Got Myself Together" (Bucket Beats) - 4:34
- US 12" vinyl
1. "Got Myself Together" (Kenlou mix) - 8:23
2. "Got Myself Together" (Nord mix) - 8:20
3. "Got Myself Together" (Todd Terry mix) - 6:22
4. "Got Myself Together" (Bucket Beats) - 4:34
5. "Sunset" - 5:37
- UK 12" vinyl
1. "Got Myself Together" (Kenlou mix) - 8:23
2. "Got Myself Together" (Hustlers Convention bass dub) - 4:43
3. "Got Myself Together" (Hustlers Convention club mix) - 6:29
4. "Got Myself Together" (Todd Terry mix) - 6:22
- UK 12" vinyl (2019 issue)
1. "Got Myself Together" (Kenlou mix) - 8:23
2. "Got Myself Together" (Ejeca rework) - 5:50
3. "Got Myself Together" (Hustlers Convention bass dub) - 4:43

== Charts ==
=== Weekly charts ===
Chart (1996)	Peak position
Australia (ARIA)	121
Estonia (Eesti Top 20)	15
Europe (Eurochart Hot 100)	26
Europe (European Dance Radio)	13
Europe (European Hit Radio)	36
Finland (Suomen virallinen lista)	6
Germany (Official German Charts)	82
Iceland (Íslenski Listinn Topp 40)	14
Ireland (IRMA)	28
Israel (Israeli Singles Chart)	27
Netherlands (Single Top 100)	49
Scotland (OCC)	21
Sweden (Sverigetopplistan)	5
UK Singles (OCC)	12
UK Dance (OCC)	1
UK Airplay (Music Week)	16
UK Club Chart (Music Week)	2
US Hot Dance Club Play (Billboard)	1
US Maxi-Singles Sales (Billboard)	21

=== Year-end charts ===
Chart (1996)	Position
US Hot Dance Club Play (Billboard)	19
