= Thunder and Lightning (Chicago song) =

Single by Chicago

from the album Chicago XIV
- B-side: "I'd Rather Be Rich"
- Released: July 30, 1980
- Recorded: 1980
- Genre: Jazz fusion
- Length: 3:32
- Label: Columbia
- Songwriters: Robert Lamm; Danny Seraphine
- Producer: Tom Dowd

Chicago singles chronology
"Street Player" (1979)	"Thunder and Lightning" (1980)	"Song for You" (1980)

"Thunder and Lightning" is a song by American band Chicago. It was released on July 30, 1980, as the first single from their twelfth studio album Chicago XIV, and was written by keyboardist Robert Lamm and drummer Danny Seraphine. It features Lamm and Peter Cetera on vocals. It was produced by Tom Dowd.

"Thunder and Lightning" peaked at No. 56 on the Billboard Hot 100 and No. 46 on the Adult Contemporary chart. It is their first single to feature Chris Pinnick on guitars, who at the time was considered a session musician and a replacement for Donnie Dacus.

On subsequent reissues of the album, Peter Cetera receives songwriting credits for "Thunder and Lightning".

== Background ==
Danny Seraphine recalled in his 2011 autobiography that he wrote the lyrics to "Thunder and Lightning" after a flight from New York City to Los Angeles where the plane was struck by lightning on two different occasions. He called his original draft of lyrics "scathing", which he based on an altercation between the band and Walter Yetnikoff of CBS over the firing of Donnie Dacus and the fate of the band's recording deal.

After Seraphine's initial draft was completed, Robert Lamm rewrote some of the lyrics around a lover's quarrel and composed the song's music with Peter Cetera. One section of the song included a the horn section part in (5/4) time, with the drums maintaining a (4/4) groove, resulting in different placements in the backbeat across each bar. Seraphine believed that the lyrical revision resulted in the song losing its original meeting and expressed disappointment that he did not advocate for some of his lyrics to be retained in the final song.

== Reception ==
Billboard thought that "Thunder and Lightning" was one of the best songs on Chicago XIV, adding that it was "embellished by Chicago's characteristic brass and percussion wizardry." Record World wrote that the song's "patented horn chops, guitar stings and spirited vocals are all wrapped in Tom Dowd's magical production on this initial release from the tireless band's XIV LP." Music critic Nick DeRiso of Something Else! Reviews wrote that the track "showed Chicago could still summon a spark of energy even as the band struggled for direction in the early '80s."

== Personnel ==
=== Chicago ===
- Robert Lamm – keyboards, lead and backing vocals
- Peter Cetera – bass, lead and backing vocals
- Laudir de Oliveira – percussion
- Lee Loughnane – trumpet
- James Pankow – trombone, solo
- Walter Parazaider – woodwinds
- Danny Seraphine – drums

=== Guest musicians ===
- Chris Pinnick – guitars

== Charts ==
Chart (1980)	Peak position
US Billboard Hot 100	56
US Adult Contemporary (Billboard)	46
US Cashbox Top 100 Singles	67
