= Song for You (Chicago song) =

- Solid center variant of the South African 7-inch single

Single by Chicago

from the album Chicago XIV
- B-side: "The American Dream" (US and South Africa); "I'd Rather Be Rich" (International exc. South Africa)
- Released: August 22, 1980
- Recorded: 1980
- Genre: Acoustic rock
- Length: 3:41
- Label: Columbia
- Songwriter: Peter Cetera
- Producer: Tom Dowd

Chicago singles chronology
"Thunder and Lightning" (1980)	"Song for You" (1980)	"Hard to Say I'm Sorry" (1982)

"Song for You" is a song by the American rock band Chicago. It was included as the third song on their fourteenth album Chicago XIV and released as its second single. "Song for You" was the band's last single to be released on Columbia Records and their last single to feature Brazilian percussionist Laudir de Oliveira, who was then replaced by the band's second keyboardist Bill Champlin. A few weeks after its release, "Song for You" reached No. 134 on the US Record World singles chart.

"Song for You" was written and sung by singer-songwriter Peter Cetera and features two B-sides. On American releases, the B-side of "Song for You" is the album's closing track, "The American Dream", while international releases (excluding South Africa) use the song "I'd Rather Be Rich" as the B-side, the same one used for "Thunder and Lightning".

In the liner notes for the band's Group Portrait box set, Cetera commented that he "love[d]" "Song for You" and also expressed interest in re-recording the song. Robert Lamm said in the liner notes for the remastered edition of Chicago XIV that "Song for You " was one of the songs that signaled the direction that Cetera would take musically for future releases. The song received some airplay on radio stations in the United Kingdom, including BBC Radio Ulster and Radio Clyde.

== Critical reception ==
Music Week felt that "Song for You" "lack[ed] the warm feeling of classic single 'If You Leave Me Now'", and believed that the single's best attribute was the instrumental guitar interlude. Record World called the song a "pretty ballad" with "intricate guitar work."

== Track listing ==
Side A
No.	Title	Writer(s)	Length
1.	"Song for You"	Cetera	3:41

Side B
No.	Title	Writer(s)	Length
2.	"The American Dream"	James Pankow	3:19

== Release history ==
Region	Date	Format(s)	Ref.
United Kingdom	August 22, 1980	7-inch	
United States	October 1980	7-inch	
South Africa	1981	7-inch	
