= Chicago X =

Studio album by Chicago
- Released: June 14, 1976
- Recorded: March – April 1976
- Studios: Caribou Ranch, Nederland, Colorado
- Genres: Jazz fusion; pop rock; pop
- Length: 37:51
- Label: Columbia
- Producer: James William Guercio

Chicago chronology
Chicago IX: Chicago's Greatest Hits (1975)	Chicago X (1976)	Chicago XI (1977)

Singles from Chicago X
- 1. "Another Rainy Day in New York City" Released: May 30, 1976; 2. "If You Leave Me Now" Released: July 30, 1976; 3. "You Are on My Mind" Released: March 24, 1977

Professional ratings
Review scores
Source	Rating
AllMusic	3/5 stars

Chicago X (nicknamed "the Chocolate Album") is the eighth studio album and tenth overall by the American rock band Chicago. It was recorded at Caribou Ranch and it was released by Columbia Records on June 14, 1976. The album made it to number three on the Billboard 200, and was certified gold by the Recording Industry Association of America (RIAA) on June 21, 1976, a week after its release. It was the band's first album to be certified platinum, on September 14, 1976, and has since been certified multi-platinum. In honor of the group's platinum album achievement, Columbia Records awarded the group a 25-pound bar of pure platinum, made by Cartier. (Billboard magazine reported it as a 30-pound bar.) (Note: Although Rolling Stone reporter Charles M. Young wrote that Chicago was awarded the platinum bar because it was the first band to receive platinum album certification for Columbia Records, this was not the case. Chicago X was certified platinum on September 4, 1976, but Aerosmith's album, Rocks, also on Columbia Records, was certified platinum on July 9, 1976, before it. Billboard reported that the platinum bar was awarded in recognition of the group's ten platinum albums. Billboard's account seems more likely in consideration of the two-full-pages advertisement Columbia placed in the June 12, 1976 issue of Record World announcing, " 'Chicago X.' Their tenth platinum album, on Columbia records and tapes." The albums released prior to 1976, however, were not actually certified platinum by the RIAA until 1986.)

Chicago X was nominated for a Grammy Award for Album of the Year, losing to Songs in the Key of Life by Stevie Wonder, and a Grammy Award for Best Album Package, which it won.

The album produced Chicago's first number one single in the United States, "If You Leave Me Now". The single went on to win two Grammy Awards: for Best Pop Vocal Performance by a Duo, Group or Chorus, the band's first Grammy Award; and for Best Arrangement Accompanying Vocalists, for arrangers James William Guercio and Jimmie Haskell. It was also nominated for the Grammy Award for Record of the Year.

The two other songs released from the album as singles also charted on the Billboard Hot 100; "Another Rainy Day in New York City" made it to number 32 and "You Are On My Mind" peaked at number 49.

== Background ==
After recording Chicago VIII in a state of exhaustion, Chicago did not return to the studio until the spring of 1976, feeling refreshed after a substantial break away. Chicago X was released on June 14, 1976, to a receptive audience, giving Chicago a number three album on the Billboard 200 in the United States, and their first album to chart in the UK in years, at number 21. This was the group's most pop-oriented effort up to that point given that every song on the album starts with the 3-minute mark, coming in stark contrast to the lengthier and more complex compositions of the albums that had preceded it.

The album featured two top forty singles: Robert Lamm's composition, "Another Rainy Day In New York City", which peaked at number 32 after a brief run in August 1976; and Peter Cetera's composition, "If You Leave Me Now", which became the band's first number one single in October of that same year. Originally written at the same time as Chicago VII's "Wishing You Were Here", "If You Leave Me Now" was one of the last to be completed and, according to reports, was very nearly left off the final product. Band member Walter Parazaider has been quoted as saying he heard the song on the radio while cleaning his pool and initially thought "it sounded like McCartney," not realizing it was his own band's work. The song became the band's first number one hit in the US and the UK. Some band members felt the song's success changed the public's perception of the band, leading to more demand from Columbia Records for ballads, although Robert Lamm has since acknowledged that the band had started moving away from their politically-oriented music into the mainstream years earlier, beginning with 1972's Chicago V.

Band members who normally were not vocalists received vocal credits on this album. The album is notable for the lead vocal debut of trombonist James Pankow. Different band singers tried "You Are on My Mind," but Pankow felt they were not nailing it the way he heard it in his head as the song's composer, so producer Guercio said, "You sing it," and that effort landed on the final album. "You Are On My Mind" was the third single for the album, reaching number 49 on the Billboard Hot 100 in April 1977. Cash Box said of it that "[t]he same mellow vocal blend is here, along with a velvety texture on the horns, but the rhythm section has speeded into a quick samba, decorated with colorful percussion." Lee Loughnane contributed the lead vocal for his song "Together Again". (Both Pankow and Loughnane would contribute lead vocals again on the next album, Chicago XI.) The brief vocal section of "You Get It Up" was sung by the entire band in unison — thus the album's atypical crediting of Danny Seraphine, Walter Parazaider, and Laudir de Oliveira with "vocals".

In 2002, Chicago X was remastered and reissued by Rhino Records with an early rendition of Chicago XIV's "I'd Rather Be Rich" by Lamm, as well as Kath's "Your Love's An Attitude" — both cut in 1975 — as bonus tracks. This album was mixed and released in both stereo and quadraphonic.

== Packaging ==
Designed by Art Director of Columbia/CBS Records, John Berg, the album art depicts a partially unwrapped chocolate bar with the Chicago logo on it, resembling a Hershey's chocolate bar as it was packaged at the time, and winning for Berg a Grammy Award for Best Album Package. The cover design is labeled "chocolate bar" on the band's official web site. The cover art was included in a 2012-2013 exhibit of Berg's album covers at Guild Hall of East Hampton, and is now in the permanent collection of The Museum of Modern Art in New York City.

== Critical reception ==
Zachary Houle writing for PopMatters in 2010 said. "It is an album of pop perfection ..."

In 2016, Jeff Giles of Ultimate Classic Rock wrote, 'Chicago X may have arrived on June 14, 1976 with a little more spark and overall energy than you might expect from a group that had been on the road for a decade, but it lacked the compositional depth and musical muscle they'd shown earlier in their career. It was essentially a pop album — not a bad one, outside the somewhat lyrically dunderheaded "Skin Tight" and "You Get It Up," but one that couldn't help but feel a little light when held up against the double-LP sets of years past.'

== Track listing ==
Side one
No.	Title	Writer(s)	Vocals	Length
1.	"Once or Twice"	Terry Kath	Kath	3:03
2.	"You Are on My Mind"	James Pankow	Pankow	3:24 (Note: Some digital and CD versions omit the countoff at the start of the song, thus shortening the track by about 8 seconds, to 3:16.)
3.	"Skin Tight"	Pankow	Peter Cetera	3:20
4.	"If You Leave Me Now"	Cetera	Cetera	3:58
5.	"Together Again"	Lee Loughnane	Loughnane	3:53
6.	"Another Rainy Day in New York City"	Robert Lamm	Cetera	3:01

Side two
No.	Title	Writer(s)	Vocals	Length
7.	"Mama Mama"	Cetera	Cetera	3:31
8.	"Scrapbook"	Lamm	Lamm	3:28
9.	"Gently I'll Wake You"	Lamm	Lamm	3:36
10.	"You Get It Up"	Lamm	All band members	3:34
11.	"Hope for Love"	Kath	Kath	3:03
Total length:				37:51

2003 reissue bonus tracks
No.	Title	Writer(s)	Lead vocals	Length
12.	"I'd Rather Be Rich (Original Version/Rehearsal)"	Lamm	Lamm	2:35
13.	"Your Love's An Attitude"	Kath	Kath	5:59
Total length:				46:25

== Personnel ==
Chicago

- Peter Cetera – bass (except on "If You Leave Me Now"), lead and backing vocals
- Terry Kath – electric guitars and acoustic guitar (except on "If You Leave Me Now" and "Hope For Love"), lead and backing vocals
- Robert Lamm – keyboards, lead and backing vocals
- Lee Loughnane – trumpet, backing vocals, lead vocals on "Together Again"
- James Pankow – trombone, lead vocals on "You Are On My Mind," backing vocals on "You Get It Up"
- Walter Parazaider – woodwinds, backing vocals
- Danny Seraphine – drums, backing vocals on "You Get It Up"
- Laudir de Oliveira – percussion, backing vocals on "You Get It Up"

Additional personnel

- David J. Wolinski – keyboards on "Hope For Love"
- James William Guercio – bass and acoustic guitars on "If You Leave Me Now", lead acoustic guitars on "Hope For Love"
- Vince DeRosa, David Duke – French horns on "If You Leave Me Now"
- Othello Molineaux – steel drums on "Another Rainy Day in New York City"
- Leroy Williams – steel drums on "Another Rainy Day in New York City"
- Jimmie Haskell – string and brass orchestration on "If You Leave Me Now" and "Mama Mama", conductor on "Gently I'll Wake You"

== Production ==
- Produced by James William Guercio
- Engineered by Wayne Tarnowski
- Assistant Engineer – Tom Likes
- Strings recorded by Armin Steiner at Sound Labs (Hollywood, CA).
- Mastered by Doug Sax at The Mastering Lab (Los Angeles, CA).
- Album Cover Concept – John Berg
- Logo Design – Nick Fasciano
- Candy Bar Photo – Columbia Records Photo Studio
- Inside Photography – Reid Miles

== Charts ==
=== Weekly charts ===
Chart (1976–1977)	Peak position
Australian Albums (Kent Music Report)	3
Austrian Albums (Ö3 Austria)	18
Canada Top Albums/CDs (RPM)	3
Dutch Albums (Album Top 100)	4
German Albums (Offizielle Top 100)	6
Italian Albums (Musica e Dischi)	8
Japanese Albums (Oricon)	54
New Zealand Albums (RMNZ)	6
Norwegian Albums (VG-lista)	7
Swedish Albums (Sverigetopplistan)	6
UK Albums (Official Charts)	21
US Billboard 200	3

=== Year-end charts ===
Chart (1976)	Position
Australian Albums (Kent Music Report)	24
Canada Top Albums/CDs (RPM)	28
New Zealand Albums (RMNZ)	31
US Billboard 200	71

Chart (1977)	Position
German Albums (Offizielle Top 100)	28
US Billboard 200	90

== Certifications ==
Region	Certification	Certified units/sales
Australia (ARIA)	Platinum	50,000^{^}
Canada (Music Canada)	Platinum	100,000^{^}
France (SNEP)	Gold	100,000^{*}
United Kingdom (BPI)	Silver	60,000^{^}
United States (RIAA)	2× Platinum	2,000,000^{^}
^{*} Sales figures based on certification alone.^{^} Shipments figures based on certification alone.
