= Chicago XIV =

Studio album by Chicago
- Released: July 21, 1980
- Recorded: March–May 1980
- Studios: Record Plant, Los Angeles, California; Criteria, Miami, Florida
- Genres: Pop rock; jazz fusion
- Length: 38:58
- Label: Columbia
- Producer: Tom Dowd

Chicago chronology
Chicago 13 (1979)	Chicago XIV (1980)	Greatest Hits, Volume II (1981)

Singles from Chicago XIV
- 1. "Thunder and Lightning" Released: July 30, 1980; 2. "Song for You" Released: August 22, 1980

Professional ratings
Review scores
Source	Rating
AllMusic	2.5/5 stars
The Rolling Stone Album Guide	1/5 stars

Chicago XIV is the twelfth studio album by American rock band Chicago, released on July 21, 1980. Recorded at a time of waning interest in the band, Chicago XIV remains one of Chicago's poorest-selling albums, failing to reach Gold certification by the Recording Industry Association of America (RIAA), and was deemed a commercial flop. It is also notable for being their last studio album with Columbia Records, and the last one to feature percussionist Laudir de Oliveira.

== Background ==
After the commercial and critical disappointment of Chicago 13, and the departure of guitarist Donnie Dacus, Chicago decided that a new strategy was in order. Chris Pinnick played guitar on the sessions and would later become an official member. The band also tried a new producer, this time Tom Dowd, who had worked with Aretha Franklin, Cream, and Eric Clapton. With Dowd taking the reins, and with Chicago abandoning the dance club sound that permeated their previous album, the band recorded a lean, more streamlined record which would, predictably, be called Chicago XIV. Possibly designed as a response to the under-produced, new wave efforts on the radio at the time, the album was the band's least orchestrated effort to date.

== Artwork, packaging ==
Designed by John Berg, art director of Columbia/CBS Records, the album cover front features an album-cover-size black thumbprint on a white background, with the Chicago logo embedded in the whorls. The album cover back also features an album-cover-size black fingerprint or thumbprint on white background, but without the embedded Chicago logo. The inside dust cover is white with black printing that lists album credits, and also has at the edge four life-size black fingerprints from a right hand on the credits side of the liner, and a corresponding life-size black thumbprint at the edge of the back of the liner. This small thumbprint also has the Chicago logo embedded in the whorls. Berg was nominated for a Grammy Award for Best Album Package for this album. The cover was included in a 2012–2013 exhibit of Berg's album covers at Guild Hall of East Hampton. The cover artwork is in the permanent collection of The Museum of Modern Art in New York City.

== Release and aftermath ==
With four solo writing credits and one cowriting credit among the ten songs on the album, Peter Cetera took on a greater songwriting role in the band than in the past. His compositions included a mix of ballads, pop and rock songs. Robert Lamm turned in the rockers "Manipulation" and "I'd Rather Be Rich" (a song from 1975 (Note: A 1975 recording of this song, slightly different from the final version, appears as a bonus track on the Rhino CD reissue of Chicago X.)); James Pankow delivered the uptempo – if downbeat – "The American Dream"; and Lamm and Danny Seraphine co-wrote "Thunder and Lightning". "Birthday Boy" marked the final collaboration between Seraphine and his songwriting partner Hawk Wolinski. Like Chicago 13 before it, Chicago XIV failed to improve Chicago's fortunes. To the record-buying public, Chicago's image was out of touch in 1980, and once the new album was released, it became clear that any attempt to win new fans would be in vain.

Columbia Records was increasingly disappointed with the poor sales performance of the band. Chicago XIV went unnoticed upon release and bombed, reaching only number seventy-one on the Billboard 200 chart in the US, and disappeared quickly. Again, there were no singles hits, with "Thunder and Lightning" stalling below the top fifty and "Song for You" failing to chart. Chicago also saw a poor attendance in many venues during the supporting tour. Realizing that the relationship had soured considerably, Columbia Records terminated their contract with Chicago with a buyout of approximately $2 million. In 1982, Robert Lamm recalled,

The thrill was gone as far as they were concerned, I think. Especially after Jeff Wald, who managed us in 1978 and 1979, kind of bullied them into signing a ridiculous multimillion dollar contract where every time we delivered an album, they had to cough up a million bucks. CBS didn't get close to recouping their money, and they wanted to get out of the deal. In fact they ended up paying us to leave the label.

As a settlement to ending the arrangement early, Columbia released the band's second greatest-hits album and jettisoned them from the label. The money from the settlement was used to record Chicago 16 independently, while the band shopped for a new label (eventually they signed with Warner). Realizing that the Latin/jazz percussion style evident in the latter half of the previous decade no longer fit with their "more pop-oriented sound", while beginning work on Chicago 16, the album Chicago XIV signaled the end of percussionist Laudir de Oliveira's tenure with the band after nine years. Peter Cetera, meanwhile, concentrated on his first self-titled solo album during the hiatus.

In 2003, Chicago XIV was remastered and reissued by Rhino Records, with three outtakes from the sessions, "Doin' Business" (which first appeared on the 1991 4-disc anthology Group Portrait), "Live It Up", and "Soldier of Fortune" as bonus tracks.

== Track listing ==
Track titles, track order, and writers for tracks one through ten from 1980 vinyl LP liner.

Side one
No.	Title	Writer(s)	Lead vocals	Length
1.	"Manipulation"	Robert Lamm	Lamm	3:45
2.	"Upon Arrival"	Lamm, Peter Cetera	Cetera, Lamm	3:48
3.	"Song for You"	Cetera	Cetera	3:41
4.	"Where Did the Lovin' Go"	Cetera	Cetera	4:06
5.	"Birthday Boy"	Danny Seraphine, David "Hawk" Wolinski	Cetera	4:55

Side two
No.	Title	Writer(s)	Lead vocals	Length
6.	"Hold On"	Cetera	Cetera	4:15
7.	"Overnight Cafe"	Cetera	Cetera	4:19
8.	"Thunder and Lightning"	Lamm, Seraphine (Note: The Rhino CD reissue credits this song to Lamm, Seraphine and Cetera.)	Cetera, Lamm	3:32
9.	"I'd Rather Be Rich"	Lamm	Lamm	3:08
10.	"The American Dream"	James Pankow	Cetera	3:19

2003 reissue bonus tracks
No.	Title	Writer(s)	Lead vocals	Length
11.	"Doin' Business"	Lamm	Lamm	3:31
12.	"Live It Up"	Pankow	Cetera	3:23
13.	"Soldier of Fortune"	Lamm	Lamm	3:50

== Personnel ==
=== Chicago ===
- Peter Cetera – bass, lead and backing vocals
- Laudir de Oliveira – percussion
- Robert Lamm – keyboards, lead and backing vocals
- Lee Loughnane – trumpet
- James Pankow – trombone
- Walter Parazaider – woodwinds
- Danny Seraphine – drums

=== Additional musicians ===
- Ian Underwood – keyboards
- David "Hawk" Wolinski – keyboards
- Mark Goldenberg – guitars
- Chris Pinnick – guitars
- Gary Grant – trumpet

== Production ==
- Produced by Tom Dowd
- Engineered and Mixed by Michael Carnevale
- Assistant Engineers – Ricky Delena, Karat Faye and Bill Freesh
- Mastered by Bernie Grundman at A&M Studios (Hollywood, CA)
- Production Coordination – Schatzi Hagerman
- Design – John Berg
- Artwork and Cover Lettering – Gerard Huerta

== Charts ==
Chart (1980)	Peak position
Australian Albums (Kent Music Report)	71
Canada Top Albums/CDs (RPM)	60
Norwegian Albums (VG-lista)	26
Swedish Albums (Sverigetopplistan)	46
US Billboard 200	71
