= Little One (Chicago song) =

Single by Chicago

from the album Chicago XI
- B-side: "Till the End of Time"
- Released: January 1978
- Recorded: 1977
- Studio: Caribou Ranch, Nederland, Colorado
- Length: 5:40 (album version); 3:29 (single edit)
- Label: Columbia
- Songwriters: Danny Seraphine; Hawk Wolinski
- Producer: James William Guercio

Chicago singles chronology
| "Baby, What a Big Surprise" (1977) | "Little One" (1978) | "Take Me Back to Chicago" (1978) |

"Little One" is a song by the American rock band Chicago. It was written by Danny Seraphine and Hawk Wolinski. The song appears as the final track on their ninth studio album Chicago XI and was issued by Columbia Records as its second single. On Chicago XI, the song is preceded by a prelude that is also credited to both Seraphine and Wolinski.

== Background ==
Seraphine wrote the lyrics for "Little One" while on a promotional tour in Europe. In his autobiography, Seraphine said that wrote the song for one of his daughters, saying that he wanted to express his disappointment that his obligations with Chicago prevented him from being fully available as a father. Seraphine developed the music with Wolinski in California and presented the song to the band, who agreed to record it.

Released in January 1978, it was the last Chicago single that featured Terry Kath on lead vocals, who died from an unintentional self-inflicted gunshot wound to the head. It peaked at No. 44 on the Billboard Hot 100, No. 44 on the Easy Listening chart, and also reached the top 50 in Canada.

"Little One" was one of the songs that Donnie Dacus played in his successful audition to replace Kath. Seraphine commented that Dacus "was one of the few musicians we auditioned who could play and sing at the same time."

== Critical reception ==
Record World described "Little One" as "a mid-tempo love song," saying that "the brass and vocal arrangements stand out as always." Cashbox was complimentary of the song's brass and orchestral arrangements and said that "Kath's presence is most keenly appreciated." Billboard characterized the band's approach on "Little One" as "laid back in MOR fashion with mellow horn work and strings.

== Charts ==
| Chart (1978) | Peak position |
|---|---|
| Canada Top Singles (RPM) | 49 |
| US Billboard Hot 100 | 44 |
| US Adult Contemporary (Billboard) | 40 |
| US Cashbox Top 100 Singles | 59 |
