= Chicago 10 =

Chicago 10 may refer to:

- Chicago 10 (film), 2007 animated film written and directed by Brett Morgen
- Chicago X, 10th album by American rock band Chicago (released in 1976)
