= Chicago XI =

Studio album by Chicago
- Released: September 12, 1977
- Recorded: April – June 1977
- Studios: Caribou Ranch, Nederland, Colorado
- Genres: Rock, jazz fusion, pop rock
- Length: 44:23
- Label: Columbia
- Producer: James William Guercio

Chicago chronology
Chicago X (1976)	Chicago XI (1977)	Hot Streets (1978)

Singles from Chicago XI
- 1. "Baby, What a Big Surprise" Released: September 1977; 2. "Little One" Released: January 1978; 3. "Take Me Back to Chicago" Released: May 1978

Chicago XI is the ninth studio album by the American rock band Chicago. It was released on September 12, 1977, through Columbia Records. It was both the last to feature guitarist and vocalist Terry Kath prior to his death in a gun accident just over four months later, and the last to be produced by longtime band associate James William Guercio.

Chicago XI was a commercial and critical success for the band, reaching the top 10 in the US and garnering generally positive reviews. Three singles were released from the album—"Baby, What a Big Surprise", "Little One", and "Take Me Back to Chicago"—with the former reaching number four on the Billboard Hot 100. Chicago XI would become the band's last album to make the top 10 until Chicago 16 in 1982.

The cover design for the album is called "Regional Map" on the group's official website.

== Background ==
According to the web site Ultimate Classic Rock, Chicago XI seems like a collection of solo songs rather than the work of the ensemble whole Chicago had been earlier in the 1970s. Peter Cetera aimed to replicate the success of the Grammy-winning "If You Leave Me Now" with "Baby, What a Big Surprise", which proved to be the album's biggest hit, going to No. 4 on the Billboard Hot 100. This was his only writing contribution to the album and, quite atypically, the only song with him on lead vocals. Terry Kath revived his old live favorite "Mississippi Delta City Blues" for the album and also sang on Danny Seraphine's "Little One." Seraphine also co-wrote "Take Me Back to Chicago", which charted at No. 63.

Kath, who was planning a forthcoming solo album, may have intended "Takin' It On Uptown" — which, besides some uncredited backup singers, possibly features only Kath himself — as a solo album "preview" along the lines of Lamm's "Skinny Boy" on Chicago VII. (Note: A note in the credits for "Takin' It On Uptown" says "This song appears through the courtesy of Cook County Music. Keep your eyes open." The same note appears on the single where "Uptown" is the B-side of "Baby, What A Big Surprise.") James Pankow sang lead on his own "Till the End of Time," as did Lee Loughnane on his original, "This Time." The once prolific Robert Lamm contributed only two songs, "Policeman" and "Vote For Me."

Upon its September 1977 release, Chicago XI (Columbia 34860) reached No. 6 in the US on the Billboard 200, stayed in the charts for 20 weeks and went platinum in October the same year. It did not chart in the UK.

While recording Chicago XI, longtime producer James William Guercio's artistic control had reached its breaking point, with the band deciding to continue without him after the album was completed. However, as big a change in their career as Guercio's dismissal would be for Chicago, it would be minor in comparison to the tragedy that awaited them.

On January 23, 1978, a few months after Chicago XI's release, Terry Kath, regarded by many as the "soul" of Chicago, accidentally and fatally shot himself during a party at roadie Don Johnson's house. A gun enthusiast, Kath attempted to calm the guests' surprise when—while reportedly inebriated—he pulled out his gun to clean it by demonstrating that it was unloaded and promptly pointed the gun to his head and pulled the trigger, not realizing a bullet was in the chamber. The remaining members of Chicago were shocked and devastated by Kath's death, and even considered breaking up. After a few weeks of mourning, they decided to move on, thus beginning a new era in the band's history. They would recruit singer/guitarist Donnie Dacus for the follow-up, Hot Streets.

In 2002, Chicago XI was remastered and reissued by Rhino Records with rehearsal recordings of Pankow's "Wish I Could Fly" (backing track) and Lamm's "Paris" as bonus tracks.

== Critical reception ==
Professional ratings
Review scores
Source	Rating
AllMusic	4/5 stars
The Rolling Stone Album Guide	2/5 stars

In her review of the album for The Sydney Morning Herald, Christine Hogan said, "If there had never been a Chicago X, this album would have been the best ever made by these perennials." Writing for The Evening Journal, Hugh Cutler called the album a "critical and commercial triumph" and said it even drew a "rave review" from Rolling Stone.

== Track listing ==
Side one
No.	Title	Writer(s)	Vocals	Length
1.	"Mississippi Delta City Blues"	Terry Kath	Terry Kath	4:39
2.	"Baby, What a Big Surprise"	Peter Cetera	Peter Cetera	3:04
3.	"Till the End of Time"	James Pankow	James Pankow	4:49 (Note: CD versions fade this song out slightly earlier than the LP version.)
4.	"Policeman"	Robert Lamm	Robert Lamm	4:02
5.	"Take Me Back to Chicago"	Danny Seraphine, Hawk Wolinski	Lamm	5:17

Side two
No.	Title	Writer(s)	Vocals	Length
6.	"Vote for Me"	Lamm	Lamm	3:47
7.	"Takin' It on Uptown"	Fred Kagan, Kath	Kath	4:45
8.	"This Time"	Lee Loughnane	Lee Loughnane	4:44
9.	"The Inner Struggles of a Man"	Dominic Frontiere (Note: The original LP ambiguously gives a single writing credit of Seraphine/Wolinski/Frontiere to "The Inner Struggles of a Man" and "Prelude (Little One)" together.)	Instrumental	2:44
10.	"Prelude (Little One)"	Seraphine, Wolinski	Kath	0:52
11.	"Little One"	Seraphine, Wolinski	Kath	5:40
Total length:				44:23

2003 reissue bonus tracks
No.	Title	Writer(s)	Vocals	Length
12.	"Wish I Could Fly (Rehearsal)"	Pankow	Instrumental	3:45
13.	"Paris (Rehearsal)"	Lamm	Lamm	3:54
Total length:				52:02

== Personnel ==
=== Chicago ===
- Robert Lamm – keyboards, vocals, percussion
- Terry Kath – guitars, vocals, percussion
- Peter Cetera – bass, vocals
- James Pankow – trombone, keyboards, percussion, lead vocals on "Till the End of Time", brass arrangements
- Walter Parazaider – woodwinds
- Lee Loughnane – trumpet, flugelhorn on "Prelude (Little One), vocals
- Danny Seraphine – drums, percussion, conception for "Prelude (Little One)"
- Laudir de Oliveira – percussion

=== Additional personnel ===
- David "Hawk" Wolinski – ARP synthesizer on "Take Me Back to Chicago"; Fender Rhodes on "Little One"
- James William Guercio – acoustic guitars and bass on "Baby, What a Big Surprise"
- Tim Cetera – additional backing vocals on "Baby, What a Big Surprise"
- Carl Wilson – additional backing vocals on "Baby, What a Big Surprise"
- Chaka Khan – backing vocals and "incredible preach" at end of "Take Me Back to Chicago"
- Dominic Frontiere – orchestral conception and conducting on "Baby, What a Big Surprise"; orchestration for "The Inner Struggles of a Man"; string and orchestral arrangements for "Little One"
- The Voices of Inspiration – choir on "Vote for Me"

== Production ==
- Producer – James William Guercio
- Audio engineer – Wayne Tarnowski
- Assistant engineer – Tom Likes
- Strings recorded by Armin Steiner at Sound Labs (Hollywood, California).
- Audio mastering – Mike Reese at The Mastering Lab (Los Angeles, California).
- Album cover design – John Berg
- Logo design – Nick Fasciano
- Inside photography – Reid Miles

== Charts ==
Chart (1977)	Peak position
Australian Albums (Kent Music Report)	7
Austrian Albums (Ö3 Austria)	9
Canada Top Albums/CDs (RPM)	4
Dutch Albums (Album Top 100)	12
German Albums (Offizielle Top 100)	39
Italian Albums (Musica e Dischi)	15
Japanese Albums (Oricon)	37
Norwegian Albums (VG-lista)	5
Swedish Albums (Sverigetopplistan)	8
US Billboard 200	6

== Certifications ==
Region	Certification	Certified units/sales
Canada (Music Canada)	Platinum	100,000^{^}
United States (RIAA)	Platinum	1,000,000^{^}
^{^} Shipments figures based on certification alone.
