= You Are on My Mind =

- Spanish picture sleeve

Single by Chicago

from the album Chicago X
- B-side: "Gently I'll Wake You"
- Released: March 24, 1977
- Recorded: 1976
- Genre: Pop rock; jazz rock; samba
- Length: 3:24: 2:51 (single edit)
- Label: Columbia
- Songwriter: James Pankow
- Producer: James William Guercio

Chicago singles chronology
"If You Leave Me Now" (1976)	"You Are on My Mind" (1977)	"Baby, What a Big Surprise" (1977)

"You Are on My Mind" is a song written and sung by James Pankow for the group Chicago and recorded for their album Chicago X. It was released as the third single from the album and charted in both Canada and the United States.

"You Are on My Mind" is one of two songs in the band's discography to be sung by Pankow, with the other song being "Till the End of Time" from the band's following album, Chicago XI. Pankow felt that the other members in Chicago did not sing the song with the inflection he desired, so James William Guercio, the band's producer at the time, suggested that Pankow handle lead vocals instead.

This became the only hit single featuring Pankow on lead vocals, as it peaked at No. 49 on the Billboard Hot 100 and No. 17 on the Adult Contemporary chart.

== Critical reception ==
Record World said that "the long-awaited follow-up to the group's chart topper, 'If You Leave Me Now'" was a "showstopper". Billboard called "You Are on My Mind" a "cheerfully fast moving tune that contains a slightly rueful lyric". They also thought that the song's "roaring horn fills and rapid tempo make this one of the veteran hit group's most jazz-influenced singles." Cashbox said that the single "cooks with Latin fire", adding that "the same mellow vocal blend is here, along with a velvety texture on the horns, but the rhythm section has speeded into a quick samba, decorated with colorful percussion."

== Personnel ==
- James Pankow – trombone, lead vocals
- Peter Cetera – bass, backing vocals
- Terry Kath – guitar, backing vocals
- Robert Lamm – keyboards, backing vocals
- Lee Loughnane – trumpet
- Walter Parazaider – woodwinds
- Danny Seraphine – drums
- Laudir de Oliveira – percussion

== Charts ==
Chart (1977)	Peak position
Canada Top Singles (RPM)	75
US Billboard Hot 100	49
US Adult Contemporary (Billboard)	17
US Cash Box Top 100	56
