= Chicago 13 =

Studio album by Chicago
- Released: August 13, 1979
- Recorded: May – June 1979
- Studios: Le Studio, Morin-Heights, Canada; A&M, Hollywood; A&R, New York City
- Genres: Rock; disco
- Length: 46:59
- Label: Columbia
- Producers: Phil Ramone and Chicago

Chicago chronology
Hot Streets (1978)	Chicago 13 (1979)	Chicago XIV (1980)

Singles from Chicago 13
- 1. "Must Have Been Crazy" Released: August 1979; 2. "Street Player" Released: October 1979

Professional ratings
Review scores
Source	Rating
AllMusic	2/5 stars
Record Mirror	3.5 stars
The Rolling Stone Album Guide	2/5 stars

Chicago 13 is the eleventh studio album by American rock band Chicago, released on August 13, 1979, by Columbia Records. Chicago 13 was the band's final release with guitarist Donnie Dacus, who had followed founding member, guitarist Terry Kath, after his death. All band members contributed to the songwriting (one of only two albums where this is the case, the other being Chicago VII).

== Background ==
After recording sessions in Morin-Heights, Quebec and Hollywood, Chicago 13—which saw the band return to numbering its albums (the first album to use an Arabic numeral in its numbering) and displaying its logo—was released in August 1979, and was preceded by Donnie Dacus's "Must Have Been Crazy" as lead single. Chicago 13 is the first Chicago album to bear no significant hit singles, and "Street Player" was the first single in the band's history to miss the Billboard Hot 100 entirely.

Despite negative reviews, Chicago 13 reached No. 21 and went gold, although it was the band's first album to miss the Top 20 and was then the lowest charting release since their debut album. Shortly after the tour to support the album ended, Dacus was fired from the band without explanation.

In 2003, Chicago 13 was remastered and reissued by Rhino Records with Dacus's "Closer to You" (an outtake from the Hot Streets sessions, released as the non-album B-side of "Must Have Been Crazy") and the 12-inch single mix of "Street Player" as bonus tracks.

The opening track, the extended disco-styled "Street Player," reached number 91 on the R&B singles chart. The songs "Street Player" and "Closer to You" had previously been released by other artists: "Street Player" by Rufus, who recorded it before Chicago, and "Closer" by Stephen Stills, though with Donnie Dacus on co-lead vocals. "Street Player" did eventually reach hit status, being sampled for the 1995 hit "The Bomb! (These Sounds Fall into My Mind)" by The Bucketheads, the 2009 hit "I Know You Want Me (Calle Ocho)" by Pitbull and the 2013 remix by dance music producer "Tradelove".

== Track listing ==
Side one
No.	Title	Writer(s)	Vocals	Length
1.	"Street Player"	Daniel Seraphine, David Wolinski	Peter Cetera	9:11
2.	"Mama Take"	Cetera	Cetera	4:14
3.	"Must Have Been Crazy"	Donnie Dacus	Dacus	3:26
4.	"Window Dreamin'"	Walter Parazaider, Lee Loughnane	Cetera	4:11
5.	"Paradise Alley"	Robert Lamm	Dacus	3:39

Side two
No.	Title	Writer(s)	Vocals	Length
6.	"Aloha Mama"	Seraphine, Wolinski	Cetera	4:11
7.	"Reruns"	Lamm	Lamm	4:29
8.	"Loser with a Broken Heart"	Cetera	Cetera	4:43
9.	"Life Is What It Is"	Laudir de Oliveira, Marcos Valle	Cetera	4:37
10.	"Run Away"	James Pankow	Cetera and Dacus	4:18

2003 reissue bonus tracks
No.	Title	Writer(s)	Vocals	Length
11.	"Closer to You"	Dacus, Stephen Stills, Warner Schwebke	Dacus	4:54
12.	"Street Player" (Dance mix)	Seraphine, Wolinski	Cetera	8:44

== Personnel ==
=== Chicago ===
- Peter Cetera – bass, lead and backing vocals
- Donnie Dacus – guitars, lead and backing vocals
- Laudir de Oliveira – percussion
- Robert Lamm – keyboards, lead and backing vocals
- Lee Loughnane – trumpet, backing vocals
- James Pankow – trombone, brass arrangements
- Walter Parazaider – woodwinds
- Danny Seraphine – drums

=== Additional personnel ===
- P.C. Moblee – lead vocals on "Window Dreamin'" and "Aloha Mama" (Moblee was actually Peter Cetera singing in a lower register. His appearance on the album is credited as "courtesy of the Peter Cetera Vocal Company").
- David "Hawk" Wolinski – synthesizer on "Street Player"
- Airto Moreira – percussion on "Street Player", "Paradise Alley", "Life Is What It Is" and "Run Away"
- Maynard Ferguson – trumpet soloist on "Street Player"

== Production ==
- Produced by Phil Ramone and Chicago
- Production Assistant – Michele Slagter
- Engineered and Mixed by Jim Boyer
- Assistant Engineers – Nick Blagona, Roger Ginsley, John Beverly Jones, Bradshaw Leigh, Peter Lewis and Robbie Whelan.
- Mastered by Ted Jensen at Sterling Sound (New York City, NY).
- Cover Design Concept – Tony Lane
- Logo Design – Nick Fasciano
- Back Cover and Sleeve Photography – Gary Heery

== Charts ==
Chart (1979)	Peak position
Australian Albums (Kent Music Report)	24
Canada Top Albums/CDs (RPM)	21
Japanese Albums (Oricon)	52
Norwegian Albums (VG-lista)	16
Swedish Albums (Sverigetopplistan)	30
US Billboard 200	21

== Certifications ==
Region	Certification	Certified units/sales
Canada (Music Canada)	Gold	50,000^{^}
United States (RIAA)	Gold	500,000^{^}
^{^} Shipments figures based on certification alone.
