= All in the Mind (album) =

Studio album by the Bucketheads
- Released: August 8, 1995
- Recorded: 1994
- Studios: Dungeon Tape, Brooklyn, New York
- Genres: House; disco funk
- Length: 61:37
- Labels: Henry Street; Big Beat; Atlantic; Positiva; EMI
- Producer: Kenny "Dope" Gonzalez

The Bucketheads chronology
All in the Mind (1995)	The Dungeon Tapes (1995)

Singles from All in the Mind
- 1. "Whew!" Released: 1994; 2. "The Bomb! (These Sounds Fall Into My Mind)" Released: 1994/early 1995; 3. "Got Myself Together" Released: October 1995

All in the Mind is the only studio album by American house music act the Bucketheads, released in August 1995 by Big Beat Records in the United States and shortly after by Positiva Records in the United Kingdom. Unimpressed with what he perceived to be fellow producers copying his characteristic style, producer Kenny "Dope" Gonzales launched the Bucketheads as a stylistic detour to explore influences such as disco, hip hop and Latin music, hoping to surprise his audience with something unexpected. He recorded All in the Mind over a period of three days in his Brooklyn home studio, using an E-mu SP-1200 and Akai S950 for the production of beats and samples.

The record combines house music with disco and funk, and is characterised by its use of contemporary tribal beats and bass lines and 1970s-style horns and related influences. Henry Street Music released the album's first single, "Whew!", to acclaim from club disc jockeys. The second single, "The Bomb! (These Sounds Fall into My Mind)", was the project's breakthrough single, reaching number one on the Billboard Hot Dance Music/Club Play chart and becoming a commercial success throughout Europe, including in the United Kingdom where it reached number 5 on the UK Singles Chart. Upon release, All in the Mind reached number 74 on the UK Albums Chart, and received positive reviews from music critics. In 2000, it was named the 31st best dance album of all time in the final edition of the book All Time Top 1000 Albums.

== Background ==
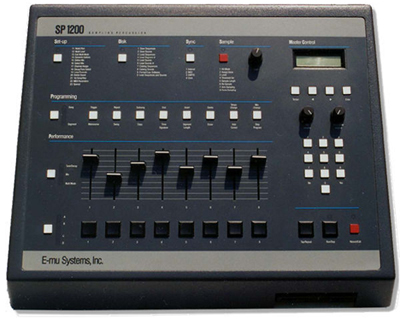
An E-mu SP-1200, as used in the album's production.

Brooklyn-based producer Kenny "Dope" Gonzalez, one half of house duo Masters at Work, founded the Bucketheads in the mid-1990s as a studio project that would allow him to fuse his populist musical influences: house, hip hop, freestyle, disco and Latin street music. Larry Flick of Billboard reported that the project emerged from a "burst of inspiration" in Gonzalez's home studio. The producer said the catalyst for the Bucketheads project and All in the Mind was his desire to change direction and "throw a curveball" to other producers who he felt were copying his sound as a solo producer and as part of Masters of Work. He stated: "I was tired of everyone being on the same tip as we were. Everything out there sounded the same. I was bored. And I thought 'Yo, I gotta come with something different'." Gonzalez also reportedly hoped to move dance music away from the emergent Eurodance genre.

After conceiving the Bucketheads project, Gonzalez recorded All in the Mind within a week, feeling he had "hit a vibe that felt right and kept going." The recording took place over three days in his home studio, Dungeon Tape. Although it had been speculated that Gonzalez created material on either an E-mu SP-1200 or an Akai MPC, Gonzalez later stated that he used an SP-1200 and an Akai S950 together in the production of his Bucketheads material. He would create rhythms and beats in the SP-1200, but as the machine did not hold lengthy samples, the S950 would instead hold the long samples which Gonzalez would then trigger using the drum machine. The producer reflected that "there was a certain vibe to the two as well. Even today you can have unlimited amounts of sample time in a machine, but it's a different vibe to those two machines." Gonzalez intended the album to be "raw and fun", and used a series of classic records as sources for samples throughout the record.

== Composition ==
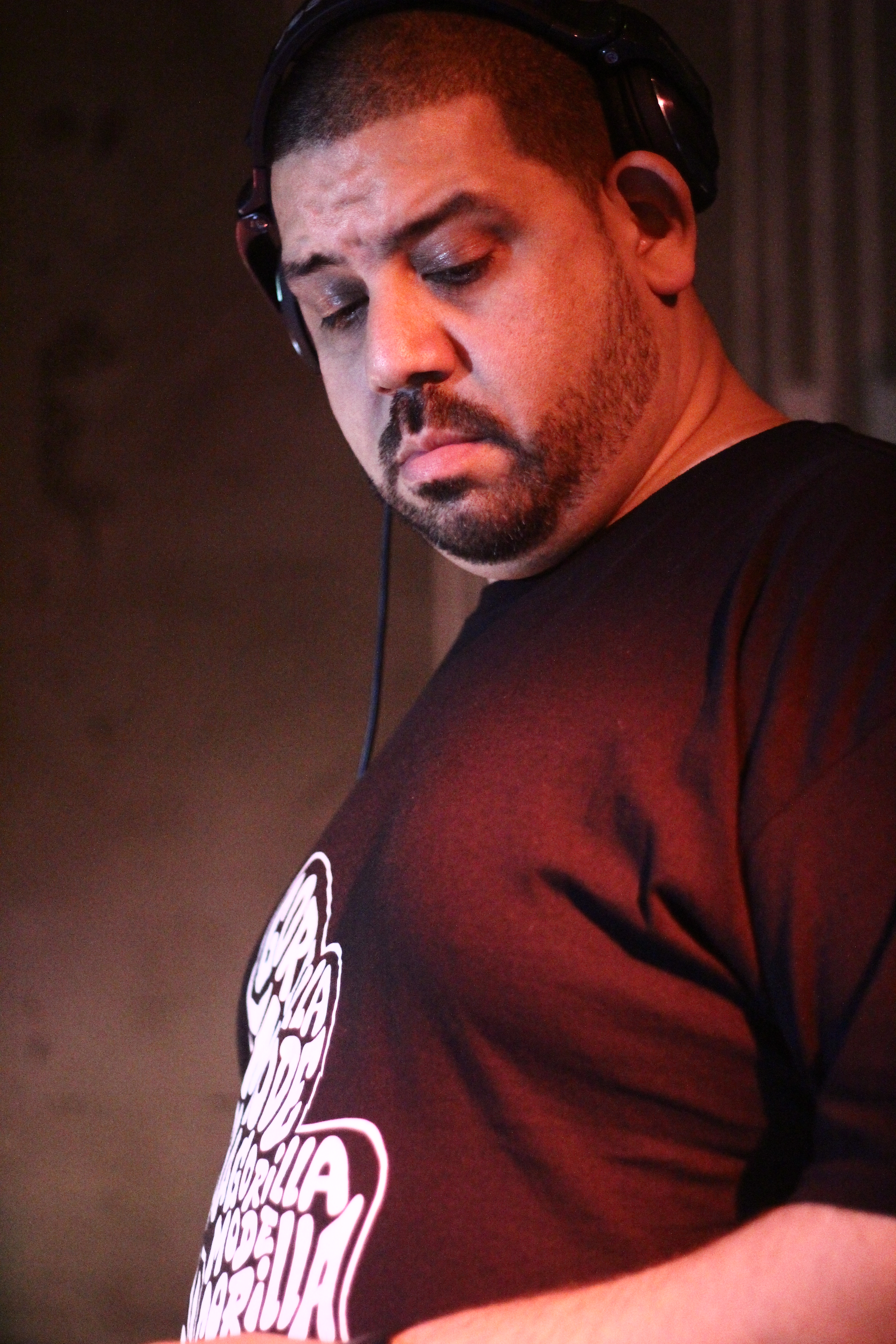
Kenny "Dope" Gonzalez (pictured in 2014) fused house music with disco and funk on All in the Mind.

All in the Mind fuses contemporary house music with 1970s-style funk and disco funk, with many of the tracks containing modern tribal house beats and bass lines alongside prominent disco horns and funk elements. The album is largely instrumental, and also incorporates instrumental hip hop according writer Colin Larkin. Flick echoed these comments, writing that the album developed upon numerous house and hip hop ideas. Some of the material is sample-based, and incorporates cut-and-paste beats. Among the songs used as the basis for tracks on the album are Wood Brass & Steel's "Funkanova", Atmosfear's "Motivation" and Linda Clifford's "Runaway Love". Further artists sampled throughout All in the Mind include Machine, Redd Foxx and Ghanaian singer Buari.

Opening song "The Bomb! (These Sounds Fall Into My Mind)" features a disco beat and an extended brass and vocal sample from Chicago's "Street Player" from Chicago 13 (1979). The sampled refrain, "street sounds swirling through my mind," was transformed into a mondegreen through the song title so that listeners mishear it as "these sounds fall into my mind." Mixmag said the song's 'genius' lies in "the way it builds up your anticipation with a protracted burst of hard jacking drums and atonal honking before the perfect disco sample soars away into the distance." "Sayin' Dope" applies funk characteristics and Latino brass atop beats described by Gareth Grundy of Select as "avant-garde but always accessible." "Got Myself Together" samples Brass Construction's "Movin'" and fuses styles of house, disco, funk and hip hop, while "Whew!" is dominated by funk elements. Gonzalez' hip hop roots surface in "Time and Space", which fuses trip hop with influences from Chic and The J.B.s, and incorporates science fiction-style sound effects and samples of Level 42's "Starchild".

== Promotion and release ==
After the completion of All in the Mind, Gonzalez showed the album to his friend Johnny "D" DeMario, who ran the house label Henry Street Music. The label released "Whew!" as the album's first single in 1994 to a favourable reaction from other DJs. "The Bomb! (These Sounds Fall Into My Mind)" was released as the second single shortly afterwards. In addition to achieving popularity in warehouse raves, "The Bomb!" became Gonzalez' commercial breakthrough. In 1995, the song reached number 1 on the Billboard Hot Dance Music/Club Play chart, and also peaked at number 49 on the Billboard Hot 100. The single was particularly successful in pop charts throughout Europe. In the United Kingdom, where "The Bomb!" was released by Positiva Records, it reached number 5 on the UK Singles Chart, and remained on the chart for nineteen weeks.

The success of the single led to an American album deal with Big Beat Records. Gonzalez recalled: "I knew we had something special, but this was wild." Big Beat released All in the Mind in the United States in August 1995, before releasing another single from the record, "Got Myself Together", in October. Meanwhile, Henry Street released a limited edition twelve-inch single of "Come and Be Gone" in August as a thank you "to DJs who were there first." In association with EMI, Positiva released a compilation of Gonzalez's singles, The Dungeon Tapes, in the UK in autumn 1995, before releasing All in the Mind in the region shortly afterwards. This version of the album features different artwork and an altered track list. It debuted at number 74 on the UK Albums Chart in January 1996, spending two weeks on the chart. "Got Myself Together" reached number 12 on the UK Singles Chart the same month. Get On Down Records re-released the album on vinyl in 2011.

== Critical reception ==
Professional ratings
Review scores
Source	Rating
AllMusic	4/5 stars
Cash Box	(favorable)
The Guardian	4/5 stars
Melody Maker	(favorable)
Muzik	4.5/5 stars
Record Collector	4/5 stars
Select	4/5 stars
The Virgin Encyclopedia of Nineties Music	4/5 stars

All in the Mind received positive reviews from critics. Gareth Grundy of Select wrote that All in the Mind would "induce a rapid rethink" in those assuming the Bucketheads project dissolved after the success of "The Bomb!" He felt the album's "edge" was provided by Gonzalez mixing his capable hip hop skills with disco music, and highlighted "Time and Space" as the album's best track. Leigh Anne Fitzpatrick of Spin felt that the album offered a "refreshing break" from the high-speed sound of techno and rave music. She highlighted "The Bomb!" for its catchy refrain, and felt the remaining tracks "provide the perfect background for any toe-tappin', fist-bumpin', hip-swayin' groove collective." The Independent concluded that "these tracks are mashed together with forceful abandon, but the turntable-scratched origins of Gonzalez's samples renders some of the grooves a little brittle and repetitive... Which, admittedly, is hardly a drawback in his genre."

Among retrospective reviews, John Bush of AllMusic wrote that the album "explores a great-sounding fusion of disco-funk and house that works well," highlighting the album's hit singles as well as "Sayin' Dope", "Jus' Plain Funky" and "Went". In The Virgin Encyclopedia of Nineties Music, writer Colin Larkin wrote that the record "confirmed the promise" laid by "The Bomb!", and noted how the album was a major departure from the established style that defined Gonzalez's music with Masters of Work. Reviewing the reissue, Kris Needs of Record Collector wrote that the "cut-and- paste beats and sample-based rough house" would become "a major influence through to the next decade." He concluded: "In today’s laptop-and- autotune quagmire, it’s time to hear again from a real master at work." In the 2000 third edition of the All Time Top 1000 Albums, All in the Mind ranked at number 31 on a list of the all-time top 50 dance albums.

"The Bomb! (These Sounds Fall Into My Mind)" emerged when house producers began to heavily incorporate the influence of disco in their music, and the song was widely regarded as an example of the fusion. Charles Aaron of Spin would later describe the song as "essential '90s funk" that mixed styles of electro, house and hip hop. In their 2006 list of "The 100 Greatest Dance Songs," where "The Bomb!" was ranked 65th, Slant magazine wrote that the song "brought disco revivalism to the world of jock jams." For the song's entry in the book 1001 Songs You Must Hear Before You Die, "The Bomb!" is credited for influencing an array of producers who sample in a "clever" fashion, as well as for inspiring "a whole host of disco gems being updated."

== Track listing ==
=== American edition ===
1. "The Bomb! (These Sounds Fall into My Mind)" (Gonzalez, Seraphine, Wolinski) – 3:23
2. "Sayin' Dope" (Gonzalez) – 6:05
3. "Got Myself Together" (Gonzalez, Miller, Williamston) – 5:25
4. "Whew!" (Collins, Gonzalez, O'Connell) – 5:26
5. "I Wanna Know" (Original Raw mix) (Batchelor, Cawthorne, Gonzalez, Johnson, Sojika) – 4:05
6. "Come and Be Gone" (Gonzalez, Powell) – 5:45
7. "Just Plain Funky" (Gonzalez) – 6:50
8. "Time and Space" (Badarou, Gonzalez, Gould, King) – 5:12
9. "You're a Runaway" (Askey, Dope, Gonzalez) – 4:30
10. "The Bomb! (These Sounds Fall into My Mind)" (Original Henry St. Mix) (Gonzalez, Seraphine, Wolinski) – 14:57

=== International edition ===
1. "The Bomb! (These Sounds Fall into My Mind)" — 3:22
2. "Sayin' Dope" — 6:05
3. "Sunset (New at)" — 5:35
4. "Time and Space" (remix) — 5:18
5. "You're a Runaway" — 5:58
6. "Come and Be Gone" — 5:45
7. "Got Myself Together" (Kenlou mix) — 8:22
8. "Just Plain Funky" — 4:33
9. "I Wanna Know" (Original Raw mix) — 4:12
10. "Went" — 5:32
11. "'Little' Louis Bonus" — 6:23
12. "The Bucketheads' Outro" — 3:33

== Personnel ==
- Kenny "Dope" Gonzalez – producer
- Johnny "D" DeMario – executive producer
- Rich Christina – executive producer
- Allan Wai – art direction and design (Big Beat edition)
