= The Bomb! (These Sounds Fall into My Mind) =

1995 single by Kenny "Dope" and the Bucketheads

Single by the Bucketheads

from the album All in the Mind
- Released: February 20, 1995
- Genre: House
- Length: 14:51 (original version); 3:24 (radio edit)
- Label: Big Beat; Henry Street Music
- Songwriters: Kenny Gonzalez; Daniel Seraphine; David Wolinski
- Producer: Kenny "Dope" Gonzalez

The Bucketheads singles chronology
"Whew" (1994)	"The Bomb! (These Sounds Fall into My Mind)" (1995)	"Come and Be Gone" (1995)

Music video
- "The Bomb! (These Sounds Fall into My Mind)" on YouTube

"The Bomb! (These Sounds Fall into My Mind)" is a house music track by Kenny Dope's musical production team the Bucketheads, released in February 1995. It was later dubbed into the project's sole album, All in the Mind (1995). The single was a commercial hit in the United Kingdom, reaching number five on the UK Singles Chart, while in the United States, it peaked at number 49 on the Billboard Hot 100. The accompanying music video was directed by British directors Guy Ritchie and Alex De Rakoff and filmed in London. In 2020, 2022 and 2025, Slant Magazine, Rolling Stone and Billboard ranked "The Bomb! (These Sounds Fall into My Mind)" among the best dance songs of all time.

== Background and release ==
Produced by Masters at Work member Kenny "Dope" Gonzalez, the track features samples from Chicago's "Street Player" from their 1979 album Chicago 13. The lyrics have a single line "these sounds fall into my mind", which repeats throughout the entire song. This line is also the subtitle of the song, which is actually considered a mondegreen; the actual lyric taken from the sample is "Street sounds swirling through my mind..." Also sampled is "The Preacher Man" (1993) by Green Velvet.

== Critical reception ==
AllMusic editor John Bush declared in a retrospective review that the song has a "great-sounding fusion of disco-funk and house that works well". Larry Flick from Billboard magazine named it "retro-happy" and "an unassuming li'l jaunt back in time that is packed with more than a savvy twist or two." Chuck Campbell from Knoxville News Sentinel wrote, "The hi-NRG Eurodance number is romping good fun and a prime promotional tool for the album All in the Mind." In his weekly UK chart commentary, James Masterton described it as a "annoyingly catchy 70s-styled dance record that comes complete with tongue-in-cheek video featuring neon lights, platform heels and mile-wide afro haircuts. One of the more unconventional dance records at the moment and possibly by definition one of the best." Simon Price from Melody Maker praised it as "102 seconds of native New York night fever, indisputably the best "dance" single made in the last calendar year." Dave Piccioni from Music Week's RM Dance Update commented, "Another all-time dance classic is reworked, rehashed and brutally stripped. Why do they do it? Well, probably because they come out sounding pretty damn good. Kenny Dope has taken a razor blade to Chicago's 'Streetplayer', added some rough and ready beats, some Latino congas, and presented a disco gem to a new generation of dancers. The result is slamming, the effect on the floor is similar. A simple sample track that is truly gorgeous."

After the 1995 re-release, RM editor Brad Beatnik said, "It's the sort of tune that will go down very well on most floors thanks to its carnival atmosphere and very funky disco beats." He concluded, "A stormer." The magazine's James Hamilton viewed it as "so consistent a seller since late September ['94] that it must surely be the biggest import in ages", describing it as "a marathon bassily burbling percussive 0.125.9bpm underground rhythm groove". John Kilgo from The Network Forty declared it as "a perfect "roll down your windows and crank up the sound" tune". Iestyn George from NME praised it as a "joyous marriage of tribal trance and disco skillfully manipulated by Kenny Dope". Gareth Grundy from Select noted its "Donna Summer's turbo-charged funk", complimenting Dope for "single-handedly [having] made disco hip again with a record played in cool clubs, provincial nitespots and behind the result on Match of the Day." Charles Aaron from Spin stated that "more than a Box novelty, "The Bomb!" is essential '90s funk, a house party on the last car of the D to the A train winding its way from Brooklyn up to Manhattan's disco meat-packing district with conductor Kenny "Dope" Gonzalez mixing electro, hip-hop, house, and Chicago (the group)." In her review of the album, Spin editor Leigh Anne Fitzpatrick concluded that "the single alone will leave you chanting the catchy line These sounds fall into my mind."

== Chart performance ==
"The Bomb! (These Sounds Fall into My Mind)" reaching number one on the US Billboard Dance Club Play, number 41 on the US Cash Box Top 100, and number 49 on the US Billboard Hot 100 chart. In Europe, the song was a top-10 hit in Belgium, France, Iceland, Ireland, Sweden, Switzerland, and the United Kingdom. In the UK, the single peaked at number five during its second week on the UK Singles Chart, on March 5, 1995. On the UK Dance Chart, the song reached number two. In 1999, it returned to the UK Dance Chart, this time peaking at number 34. Additionally, "The Bomb! (These Sounds Fall into My Mind)" entered the top 20 in Austria, Finland, Germany, Italy, the Netherlands, and Spain, as well as on the Eurochart Hot 100, on which the song peaked at number 12 in July 1995. Outside Europe, it reached number eight on the Canadian RPM Dance chart, number 11 in Australia, number 21 in New Zealand and number 25 in Israel. The song was awarded with a gold record in the United Kingdom and in France.

== Music video ==
The music video for "The Bomb!" was directed by British directors Guy Ritchie and Alex De Rakoff on a budget of roughly £1,000, being one of their first music video recordings shot on a Super 8 film camera, inspired by some of the Beastie Boys' music video recording styles. It was filmed in London, as can be discerned from the side of the road being driven on with the car's steering wheel on the right side of the car and double-decker buses, and first aired in March 1995. "The Bomb!" was a Box Top on British music television channel The Box in April 1995. It was A-listed on France's MCM in August, and also received active rotation on MTV Europe and was B-listed on Germany's VIVA in June same year. At the 1995 Billboard Music Video Awards, it was nominated for two awards in the category for Dance; Best Clip and Best New Artist Clip. On January 28, 1996, the video was featured on the Beavis and Butt-head episode "Prank Call".

=== Synopsis ===
The video starts off with a black man with an afro waking up because of an alarm clock alongside two blonde haired white women, one with wavy hair and the other with straight hair, the latter of which gets her hair done into pigtails. After they all get themselves ready to go out to have fun, they walk out of the home and the blonde with pigtails is seen driving through London in a Volkswagen Superbug, which the man with an afro later drives while nodding to the blonde with pigtails, who quickly turns away. The gang are seen walking together through a market area and later go into a record shop where the man with an afro finds a record within the store's inventory of this exact song. They all later leave the record store, walk more through the market area, then the man with an afro departures from the two blondes via a kiss on their cheeks, later entering a nightclub called Carwash.

== Impact and legacy ==
In 1996, Mixmag ranked the song number 60 in its "100 Greatest Dance Singles of All Time" list, writing, "A quarter of an hour's worth of mirrorball mayhem, Kenny 'Dope' Gonzales' 'The Bomb' is the ultimate disco cutup track. Shatteringly simple, the genius of 'The Bomb' lies in the way it builds up your anticipation with a protracted burst of hard jacking drums and atonal honking before the perfect disco sample soars away into the distance. A massive hit when Positiva licensed it in early 1995, 'The Bomb' kick-started the trend for raiding old disco 12s. Dozens of producers followed its lead, but none of them ever equalled the definitive original article." In 1998, DJ Magazine ranked it number 95 in their "Top 100 Club Tunes". In 1999, German Spex included it in their list of "The Best Singles of the Century". In 2006, Slant Magazine ranked the song 65th in its "100 Greatest Dance Songs" list. In 2011, The Guardian featured it in their "A History of Modern Music: Dance". Same year, MTV Dance placed "The Bomb!" at No. 10 in their list of "The 100 Biggest 90's Dance Anthems of All Time" in November.

In 2015, Idolator ranked it number 34 in their ranking of "The 50 Best Pop Singles of 1995", saying, "Who would have predicted that The Karate Kid, Part II balladeer and former lead singer of Chicago, Peter Cetera, would experience a mid-'90s career renaissance as a house music diva? (Not even Miss Cleo!) But that's exactly what happened when noted remixer/producer Kenny "Dope" Gonzales lifted a vintage slice of Chicago's "Street Player", dressed it with a funky kick, edited the hell out of the horn section and Cetera's vocals and turned it all out as 'The Bomb!'" In 2017, BuzzFeed ranked the song number 44 in their "The 101 Greatest Dance Songs of the '90s" list. In 2019, Mixmag ranked it as one of "The 20 Best US Rave Anthems of the '90s", writing, "Sampling the band Chicago's 1979 track 'Street Player', Kenny Dope created a slick piece of house that forces hands in the air everywhere." In 2020, Slant Magazine ranked it number 48 in their list of "The 100 Best Dance Songs of All Time". Same year, Tomorrowland included it in their official list of "The Ibiza 500". In March 2025, Billboard magazine ranked "The Bomb!" number 51 in their "The 100 Best Dance Songs of All Time", writing, "Decades after its release, the original is still one of the most-played tracks in Ibiza clubs, and its funky DNA lives on, sampled (and loved) by new generations."

=== Accolades ===
Year	Publisher	Country	Accolade	Rank
1995	Billboard Music Video Awards	United States	"Best Dance Clip"	nomination
1995	Billboard Music Video Awards	United States	"Best New Dance Artist Clip"	nomination
1996	ASCAP	United States	"1996 Rhythm & Soul Awards"	*
1996	International Dance Music Awards	United States	"Best House 12-inch"	1
1996	Mixmag	United Kingdom	"The 100 Best Dance Singles of All Time"	60
1998	DJ Magazine	United Kingdom	"Top 100 Club Tunes"	95
1999	Spex	Germany	"Die besten Singles aller Zeiten"	*
2006	Slant Magazine	United States	"100 Greatest Dance Songs"	65
2010	Pitchfork	United States	"Ten Actually Good 90s Jock Jams"	*
2011	The Guardian	United Kingdom	"A History of Modern Music: Dance"	*
2011	MTV Dance	United Kingdom	"The 100 Biggest 90's Dance Anthems of All Time"	10
2015	Idolator	United States	"The 50 Best Pop Singles of 1995"	34
2015	Robert Dimery	United States	"1,001 Songs You Must Hear Before You Die, and 10,001 You Must Download (2015 Update)"	1-1001
2017	BuzzFeed	United States	"The 101 Greatest Dance Songs Of the '90s"	44
2019	Mixmag	United Kingdom	"The 20 Best US Rave Anthems of the '90s"	*
2020	Slant Magazine	United States	"The 100 Best Dance Songs of All Time"	48
2022	Classic Pop	United Kingdom	"90s Dance – The Essential Playlist"	37
2022	Rolling Stone	United States	"200 Greatest Dance Songs of All Time"	77
2024	Billboard	United States	"The 100 Greatest Jock Jams of All Time"	96
2025	Billboard	United States	"The 100 Best Dance Songs of All Time"	51
2025	Billboard	United States	"The 50 Best House Songs of All Time"	27

(*) indicates the list is unordered.

== Track listings ==
- 7-inch single
1. "The Bomb! (These Sounds Fall into My Mind)" (radio edit) – 3:22
2. "The Bomb! (These Sounds Fall into My Mind)" (Armand Van Helden re-edit) – 8:03
- 12-inch maxi 1 - UK
1. "The Bomb! (These Sounds Fall into My Mind)" – 13:58
2. "I Wanna Know" – 7:15
3. "The Bomb! (These Sounds Fall into My Mind)" (radio edit) – 3:22
- 12-inch maxi 2 - UK
1. "The Bomb! (These Sounds Fall into My Mind)" – 14:51
2. "The Bomb! (These Sounds Fall into My Mind)" (Armand Van Helden re-edit) – 8:03
3. "I Wanna Know" – 7:15
- 12-inch maxi - US
1. "The Bomb! (These Sounds Fall into My Mind)" (original mix)
2. "The Bomb! (These Sounds Fall into My Mind)" (Johnick Radio Edit)
3. "The Bomb! (These Sounds Fall into My Mind)" (bonus beats)
- CD single
1. "The Bomb! (These Sounds Fall into My Mind)" (radio edit) – 3:22
2. "The Bomb! (These Sounds Fall into My Mind)" – 14:51
- CD maxi - UK
1. "The Bomb! (These Sounds Fall into My Mind)" (radio edit) – 3:22
2. "The Bomb! (These Sounds Fall into My Mind)" – 14:51
3. "The Bomb! (These Sounds Fall into My Mind)" (Armand Van Helden re-edit) – 8:03
- CD maxi - US
1. "The Bomb! (These Sounds Fall into My Mind)" (radio edit) – 3:24
2. "The Bomb! (These Sounds Fall into My Mind)" (Kenny Dope remix) – 4:32
3. "The Bomb! (These Sounds Fall into My Mind)" (jinxx remix) – 5:02
4. "The Bomb! (These Sounds Fall into My Mind)" (bonus beats) – 5:06

== Charts ==
=== Weekly charts ===
Chart (1995)	Peak position
Australia (ARIA)	11
Austria (Ö3 Austria Top 40)	16
Belgium (Ultratop 50 Flanders)	17
Belgium (Ultratop 50 Wallonia)	3
Canada Dance/Urban (RPM)	8
Europe (Eurochart Hot 100)	12
Europe (European Dance Radio)	9
Finland (Suomen virallinen lista)	14
France (SNEP)	4
Germany (GfK)	19
Iceland (Íslenski Listinn Topp 40)	2
Ireland (IRMA)	10
Israel (Israeli Singles Chart)	25
Italy (Musica e dischi)	13
Netherlands (Dutch Top 40)	12
Netherlands (Single Top 100)	11
New Zealand (Recorded Music NZ)	21
Scottish Singles Sales (Official Charts)	9
Spain (AFYVE)	12
Sweden (Sverigetopplistan)	5
Switzerland (Schweizer Hitparade)	7
UK Singles (Official Charts)	5
UK Dance (Official Charts)	2
UK Pop Tip Club Chart (Music Week)	6
US Billboard Hot 100	49
US Dance Club Play (Billboard)	1
US Maxi-Singles Sales (Billboard)	1
US Rhythmic Top 40 (Billboard)	23
US Cash Box Top 100	41

Chart (1999)	Peak position
UK Dance (Official Charts)	34

=== Year-end charts ===
Chart (1995)	Position
Australia (ARIA)	80
Belgium (Ultratop 50 Flanders)	94
Belgium (Ultratop 50 Wallonia)	25
Europe (Eurochart Hot 100)	38
France (SNEP)	17
Germany (Media Control)	68
Iceland (Íslenski Listinn Topp 40)	26
Netherlands (Dutch Top 40)	99
Sweden (Topplistan)	46
Switzerland (Schweizer Hitparade)	15
UK Singles (OCC)	46
UK Pop Tip Club Chart (Music Week)	20
US Dance Club Play (Billboard)	5
US Maxi-Singles Sales (Billboard)	16

== Certifications ==
Region	Certification	Certified units/sales
France (SNEP)	Gold	250,000^{*}
United Kingdom (BPI)	Gold	400,000^{‡}
^{*} Sales figures based on certification alone.^{‡} Sales+streaming figures based on certification alone.

== Release history ==
Region	Date	Format(s)	Label(s)	Ref.
United Kingdom	February 20, 1995	7-inch vinyl; 12-inch vinyl; CD; cassette	Positiva; Henry Street Music	
Australia	April 17, 1995	CD	Positiva; Henry Street Music	
United States	June 6, 1995	Rhythmic contemporary radio	Big Beat; Henry Street Music	
United States	July 25, 1995	Contemporary hit radio	Big Beat; Henry Street Music	
