= Must Have Been Crazy =

Single by Chicago

from the album Chicago 13
- B-side: "Closer to You"
- Released: August 1979
- Recorded: 1979
- Genre: Folk rock; funk rock; country rock
- Length: 3:26
- Label: Columbia
- Songwriter: Donnie Dacus
- Producers: Chicago; Phil Ramone

Chicago singles chronology
"Gone Long Gone" (1979)	"Must Have Been Crazy" (1979)	"Street Player" (1979)

"Must Have Been Crazy" is a song by the American rock band Chicago. It was released in August 1979 as the lead single from their eleventh studio album, Chicago 13, and was written by Donnie Dacus, who performs lead vocals in the song. It peaked at No. 83 on the Billboard Hot 100.

== Reception ==
Billboard characterized the song as having "a funky, guitar-dominated Southern California rock approach" that forwent the band's "trademark brassy pop punch". They also said that the song's "familiar vocal harmonies at the tag give it a distinctive hook". Cashbox felt that the song signified the band's pivot toward rock music with "smokin' slide guitar work, pounding drums and cowbell".

SomethingElse Reviews! gave a mixed evaluation of the song, saying that it was "not a bad song" musically with a "kind of catchy" groove and guitar textures courtesy of Donnie Dacus that lend a "Texas roadhouse" flair. They called the lyrics "uninspired, bland, repetitive, and unoriginal" and also labeled the lead vocals as "forgettable". The review concluded by portraying "Must Have Been Crazy" as a hollow attempt to recapture their earlier success amid the commercial and artistic struggles surrounding Chicago 13.

== Personnel ==
- Donnie Dacus – guitars, lead and backing vocals
- Peter Cetera – bass, backing vocals
- Danny Seraphine – drums
- Laudir de Oliveira – percussion

== Charts ==
Chart (1979)	Peak position
US Billboard Hot 100	83
US Cashbox Top 100 Singles	84
