= Dialogue (Part I & II) =

Single by Chicago

from the album Chicago V
- B-side: "Now That You've Gone"
- Released: October 6, 1972
- Recorded: September 1971
- Genre: Funk rock; pop rock
- Length: 4:53 (Single version); 2:56 (Part I); 4:13 (Part II); 7:11 (Album version)
- Label: Columbia
- Songwriter: Robert Lamm
- Producer: James William Guercio

Chicago singles chronology
| "Saturday in the Park" (1972) | "Dialogue (Part I & II)" (1972) | "Feelin' Stronger Every Day" (1973) |

"Dialogue" is a song written by Robert Lamm for the group Chicago and recorded for their album Chicago V (1972). On the album the song is over 7 minutes long and is divided in two parts. An edited version was released as a single in October 1972, eventually reaching #24 on the U.S. Billboard Hot 100. A live recording of the full song can be heard in Chicago XXXIV: Live in '75. Part II was included in Greatest Hits, Volume II (1982).

== Content ==
In Part I, the song's lyrics are a dialogue between two young people with different views. The first person (whose lines are sung by Terry Kath) is very concerned about events of the early 1970s, such as the Vietnam war, starvation, and "repression... closing in around." The second person (whose lines are sung by Peter Cetera) maintains that "everything is fine." The dialogue between the two people is also reflected musically, with Kath's guitar and Cetera's bass feeding off each other. As Part I comes to a close, Kath's character thanks the other character for the talk, saying "you know you really eased my mind/I was troubled by the shapes of things to come." Cetera's character response is of gratitude for the eye-opener: "Well, if you had my outlook, your feelings would be numb – you'd always think that everything was fine".

With the two characters acknowledging the other's position, the song moves to Part II, where more propositive lyrics such as "we can make it better", "we can change the world now" and "we can save the children" are sung by multiple band members. In the finale, the music fades away with the band singing a cappella the optimistic appeal "we can make it happen".

== Critical reception ==
Record World called it a "controversial tune which is actually a dialogue between the two lead vocals concerning America's problems" and claimed that the song contained an "important message." Cash Box said that the single edit "still leaves all of the dynamics intact, and programmers in both pop and FM markets will love it." Buffalo News critic Dale Anderson found the philosophizing to be "amateurish".

Ultimate Classic Rock critic Dave Swanson rated it as Chicago's 4th best song, stating that "In both its world-changing message and gospel-tinged refrain, this song is very much of its time. But there's nothing wrong with that; we can always use a little idealism." Patriot-News critic Nick Williams rated it as Chicago's 3rd best song, praising its use of irony and how the song's "abrupt ending sends a wonderful message about the effects of burying one's head in the sand."

== Personnel ==
- Terry Kath – guitar, lead vocals (1st person, part 1)
- Peter Cetera – bass, lead vocals (2nd person, part 1)
- Robert Lamm – keyboards, backing vocals (part 2)
- Danny Seraphine – drums
- Jimmy Pankow – trombone
- Lee Loughnane – trumpet, backing vocals (part 2)
- Walt Parazaider – tenor saxophone

== Chart history ==
| Chart (1972) | Peak position |
|---|---|
| Canada RPM Top Singles | 26 |
| US Billboard Hot 100 | 24 |
| US Cash Box Top 100 | 17 |
