= Another Rainy Day in New York City =

Single by Chicago

from the album Chicago X
- B-side: "Hope for Love"
- Released: May 30, 1976
- Recorded: 1976
- Genre: Pop rock; jazz rock
- Length: 3:01: 2:57 (single edit)
- Label: Columbia
- Songwriter: Robert Lamm
- Producer: James William Guercio

Chicago singles chronology
"Brand New Love Affair" (1975)	"Another Rainy Day in New York City" (1976)	"If You Leave Me Now" (1976)

"Another Rainy Day in New York City" is a song written by Robert Lamm for the band Chicago and recorded for their album Chicago X. It was sung by Peter Cetera and released as the album's lead single.

While "Another Rainy Day in New York City" was ascending the US Billboard Hot 100, "If You Leave Me Now" was released as the next single and debuted on the August 14, 1976 chart at No. 60. The commercial success of "If You Leave Me Now" began to eclipse "Another Rainy Day in New York City", which dropped from its peak of No. 32 to No. 46 that same week. "Another Rainy Day in New York City" also peaked at No. 2 on the Adult Contemporary chart.

== Critical reception ==
Billboard described "Another Rainy Day in New York City" as "a pop/jazzy rocker with a touch of reggae flavor." Cashbox said that "the lyric is good, really creates a mood." Record World called it a "Caribbean-styled number is handled with the band's consummate professionalism and good taste." Leslie Ann Ryan of The Register characterized it as "the only typical Chicago track on the album".

== Personnel ==
- Peter Cetera – lead and backing vocals, bass
- Terry Kath – electric and twelve-string acoustic guitars, backing vocals
- Robert Lamm – piano, backing vocals
- Lee Loughnane – trumpet, backing vocals
- James Pankow – trombone
- Walter Parazaider – tenor saxophone, flute
- Danny Seraphine – drums
- Laudir de Oliveira – congas, guiro, shakers and wind chimes

Additional personnel

- Othello Molineaux – steel drums
- Leroy Williams – steel drums
