= Gone Long Gone (Chicago song) =

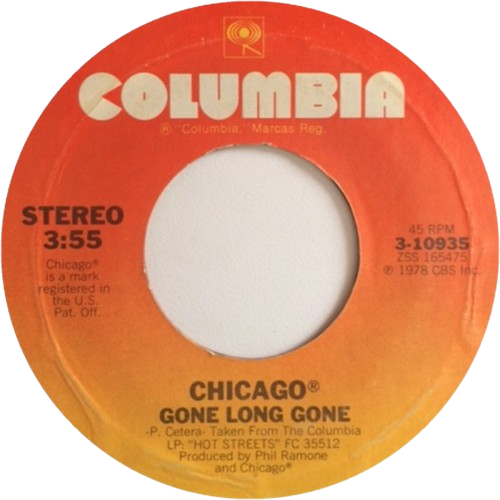
- Solid center variant of the US 7-inch single

Single by Chicago

from the album Hot Streets
- B-side: "The Greatest Love on Earth"
- Released: March 1979
- Recorded: 1978
- Genre: Country rock
- Length: 4:00
- Label: Columbia
- Songwriter: Peter Cetera
- Producers: Chicago; Phil Ramone

Chicago singles chronology
"No Tell Lover" (1978)	"Gone Long Gone" (1979)	"Must Have Been Crazy" (1979)

"Gone Long Gone" is a song by the American rock band Chicago. It was released as the third and final single from their tenth studio album Hot Streets and it appears as the sixth song on Hot Streets. It was written by singer-songwriter Peter Cetera and produced by Chicago and Phil Ramone.

"Gone Long Gone" peaked at No. 73 on the Billboard Hot 100 and No. 93 on the RPM Top Singles chart.

== Reception ==
Cashbox said of the single that the guitar introduction sounds like George Harrison and said that it has "slick harmonies and smooth production" and praised "Donnie Dacus' guitar shadings." Record World called it "a soft, mid-tempo rocker propelled by Peter Cetera's familiar vocals" with "compelling lofty guitar work."

== Charts ==
Chart (1979)	Peak position
Canada Top Singles (RPM)	93
US Billboard Hot 100	73
US Cashbox Top 100 Singles	75
