= No Tell Lover =

Single by Chicago

from the album Hot Streets
- B-side: "Take a Chance"
- Released: December 9, 1978
- Genre: Soft rock
- Length: 3:48 (Single version); 4:13 (Album version)
- Label: Columbia
- Songwriters: Peter Cetera, Lee Loughnane, Danny Seraphine
- Producers: Phil Ramone & Chicago

Chicago singles chronology
"Alive Again" (1978)	"No Tell Lover" (1978)	"Gone Long Gone" (1979)

"No Tell Lover" is a song written by Lee Loughnane, Danny Seraphine, and Peter Cetera for the group Chicago and recorded for their album Hot Streets (1978), with Cetera and Donnie Dacus singing lead vocals. The second single released from that album, it reached No. 14 on the U.S. Billboard Hot 100 chart and No. 5 on the adult contemporary chart.

Cash Box called it a "classy pop single" that tells "a sultry tale of masked love." Record World said it "has the feel of a classic Chicago ballad." In 2019, Billboard said about the song, "While the lyrical content — an ode to extramarital affairs — hasn’t particularly benefitted from the passing years, “No Tell Lover” is still a beautifully penned number from Chicago’s transition into soft-rock nobility."

After "No Tell Lover", Chicago failed to chart a single in the U.S. top 50 for nearly four years, finally breaking their slump with the 1982 No. 1 hit, "Hard to Say I'm Sorry".

== Personnel ==
- Peter Cetera - lead and backing vocals, bass
- Donnie Dacus - lead and backing vocals, electric guitars
- Robert Lamm - Fender Rhodes electric piano, backing vocals
- Danny Seraphine - drums
- Laudir de Oliveira - percussion
- James Pankow - trombone
- Lee Loughnane - trumpet, backing vocals
- Walt Parazaider - tenor saxophone
- Blue Weaver - ARP String Ensemble synthesizer

== Chart performance ==
=== Weekly charts ===
Chart (1978–79)	Peak position
Canada RPM Top Singles	10
Canada RPM Adult Contemporary	20
New Zealand	22
U.S. Billboard Hot 100	14
U.S. Billboard Adult Contemporary	5
U.S. Radio & Records	9
U.S. Cash Box Top 100	14

=== Year-end charts ===
Chart (1979)	Rank
Canada	87
