= Millions Like Us (band) =

Pop Rock Band

Millions Like Us was an English pop rock band signed to Virgin Records.

Millions Like Us released one album, ...millions like us., in 1987, which reached No. 171 on the Billboard 200 in the United States. A single from the album, "Guaranteed for Life", reached No. 28 on the U.S. Adult Contemporary Chart and No. 69 on the Billboard Hot 100.

== Members ==
- John O'Kane - vocals
- Jeep Hook - guitar, keyboards
