= Chicago V =

Studio album by Chicago
- Released: July 10, 1972
- Recorded: September 20–29, 1971
- Studios: Columbia 52nd Street, New York City
- Genres: Rock; jazz rock
- Length: 45:16
- Label: Columbia
- Producer: James William Guercio

Chicago chronology
Chicago at Carnegie Hall (1971)	Chicago V (1972)	Chicago VI (1973)

Singles from Chicago V
- 1. "Saturday in the Park" Released: July 13, 1972; 2. "Dialogue (Part I & II)" Released: October 1972

Professional ratings
Review scores
Source	Rating
AllMusic	4/5 stars
Rolling Stone	(not rated)

Chicago V is the fourth studio album by the American rock band Chicago. It was released on July 10, 1972, by Columbia Records. It is the group's first single album release, after having released three consecutive double albums and a four-disc box set of live material Chicago at Carnegie Hall which is considered "Chicago IV" hence this album being titled Chicago V.

== History ==
Following the release of Chicago III in 1971, the group changed from producing double albums, with many songs arranged in extended suites, in favor of more concise tracks on a single album. It is often considered the group's return-to-basics as it has a sound resembling their first album, Chicago Transit Authority. Chicago V is also notable for Robert Lamm's prolific songwriting; Eight out of its ten tunes are composed solely by him. Terry Kath wrote and sang the album's final track "Alma Mater", which showcased his acoustic guitar abilities. The song "A Hit by Varèse" is a tribute to French-American composer Edgard Varèse. This would be the last album not to have any compositions from Peter Cetera during his tenure in the band.

Recorded just before Chicago at Carnegie Hall was released in late 1971, Chicago V was cut in just over a week and held over for release until the following summer. Released shortly before the album, the single "Saturday in the Park" was the band's biggest hit to that point, reaching No. 3 in the US. Chicago V was critically acclaimed and became Chicago's first No.1 album, spending nine weeks atop the charts in the US. In the UK, the release managed to reach No. 24. The follow-up single "Dialogue (Part I & II)" also became a hit, peaking at No. 24 in the US.

This album was mixed and released in both stereo and quadraphonic. In 2002, Chicago V was remastered and reissued by Rhino Records with three bonus tracks: a rehearsal of Lamm's "A Song for Richard and His Friends", which was debuted at Carnegie Hall, an early rehearsal of Kath's "Mississippi Delta City Blues" (which would later be re-recorded and released on Chicago XI), and a single edit of "Dialogue".

On August 17, 2011, Warner Japan released this album as a hybrid stereo-multichannel Super Audio CD in their Warner Premium Sound series.

== Critical reception ==
=== Accolades ===
1973: Chicago V, Best Small-Combo LP, Playboy Jazz & Pop Poll

== Track listing ==
Side one
No.	Title	Writer(s)	Vocals	Length
1.	"A Hit by Varèse"	Robert Lamm	Lamm	4:56
2.	"All Is Well"	Lamm	Lamm	3:52
3.	"Now That You've Gone"	James Pankow	Terry Kath	5:01
4.	"Dialogue (Part I)"	Lamm	Kath, Peter Cetera	2:57
5.	"Dialogue (Part II)"	Lamm	Kath, Cetera	4:13

Side two
No.	Title	Writer(s)	Vocals	Length
1.	"While the City Sleeps"	Lamm	Lamm	3:53
2.	"Saturday in the Park"	Lamm	Lamm, Cetera	3:56
3.	"State of the Union"	Lamm	Cetera	6:12
4.	"Goodbye"	Lamm	Cetera	6:02
5.	"Alma Mater"	Kath	Kath	3:56

2002 reissue bonus tracks
No.	Title	Writer(s)	Length
11.	"A Song for Richard and His Friends" (Studio version without vocals)	Lamm	8:15
12.	"Mississippi Delta City Blues" (First recorded version with scratch vocal)	Kath	5:28
13.	"Dialogue (Part I & II)" (Single edit)	Lamm	5:02

== Personnel ==
=== Chicago ===
- Robert Lamm – acoustic piano, Hammond organ, Fender Rhodes, Hohner Pianet, lead and backing vocals
- Terry Kath – electric and acoustic guitars, lead and backing vocals
- Peter Cetera – bass guitar, wah-wah bass, lead and backing vocals
- James Pankow – trombone, percussion, brass arrangements
- Walter Parazaider – saxophones, flute, percussion
- Lee Loughnane – trumpet, flugelhorn, percussion, backing vocals
- Danny Seraphine – drums, congas, antique bells, percussion

== Production ==
- Produced by James William Guercio
- Engineered by Wayne Tarnowski
- Logo Design – Nick Fasciano
- Album Design – John Berg
- Photography – Jim Houghton and Earl Steinbicker
- Lettering – Beverly Scott
- Remastering – Joe Gastwirt

== Charts ==
Chart (1972)	Position
Australian Albums (Kent Music Report)	5
Canada Top Albums/CDs (RPM)	4
Dutch Albums (Album Top 100)	4
Finnish Albums (The Official Finnish Charts)	14
Italian Albums (Musica e Dischi)	13
Japanese Albums (Oricon)	3
Norwegian Albums (VG-lista)	7
UK Albums (Official Charts)	24
US Billboard Top LPs	1
US Best Selling Soul LP's (Billboard)	33

== Certifications ==
Region	Certification	Certified units/sales
Canada (Music Canada)	Platinum	100,000^{^}
United States (RIAA)	2× Platinum	2,000,000^{^}
^{^} Shipments figures based on certification alone.
