= Take Me Back to Chicago =

- Side A of the US single

Single by Chicago

from the album Chicago XI
- B-side: "Policeman"
- Released: May 1978
- Recorded: 1977
- Genre: Soft rock
- Length: 2:57 (Single version); 5:17 (Album version)
- Label: Columbia
- Songwriters: Danny Seraphine, David "Hawk" Wolinski
- Producer: James William Guercio

Chicago singles chronology
"Little One" (1978)	"Take Me Back to Chicago" (1978)	"Alive Again" (1978)

"Take Me Back to Chicago", originally released on the Chicago XI album, was a 1978 chart hit in the U.S. and Canada for the band Chicago. It was written by Danny Seraphine and Hawk Wolinski. The song features Chaka Khan on backing vocals, and was the last to feature Terry Kath.

Released as a single in May 1978, the song reached No. 63 on the Billboard Hot 100 and No. 62 on the Cash Box Top 100 in the United States. In Canada, it peaked at No. 66. On the adult contemporary charts, it reached No. 39 in the U.S. and No. 21 in Canada.

== Critical reception ==
Billboard called the song "a cool, easy tempo number which is perfect radio fare for summer" and highlighted the "soft, smooth opening" that "gives way to a hotter sound of horns and soulful female voices". Cashbox wrote that song "bears the group’s distinctive mark of classy horn arrangement and tight vocals" and that Kath's presence on the track "was keenly felt". Record World thought that the song possessed one of the band's "best melodies and arrangements in some time" and believed that it would be "a likely hit".

== Personnel ==
- Robert Lamm – keyboards, lead and backing vocals
- Terry Kath – guitars, backing vocals
- Peter Cetera – bass, backing vocals
- James Pankow – trombone
- Walter Parazaider – saxophone
- Lee Loughnane – trumpet
- Danny Seraphine – drums
- Laudir de Oliveira – percussion

Additional personnel

- David "Hawk" Wolinski – ARP synthesizer
- Chaka Khan – backing vocals and "incredible preach"

== Chart performance ==
Chart (1978)	Peak position
Canada Top Singles (RPM)	66
Canada Adult Contemporary (RPM)	21
US Billboard Hot 100	63
US Adult Contemporary (Billboard)	39
