= Alive Again (Chicago song) =

Single by Chicago

from the album Hot Streets
- B-side: "Love Was New"
- Released: October 1978
- Genre: Disco; hard rock
- Length: 3:32 (single version); 4:10 (album version)
- Label: Columbia
- Songwriter: James Pankow
- Producers: Phil Ramone & Chicago

Chicago singles chronology
"Take Me Back to Chicago" (1978)	"Alive Again" (1978)	"No Tell Lover" (1978)

"Alive Again" is a song written by James Pankow for the group Chicago and recorded for their album Hot Streets (1978), with Peter Cetera singing lead vocals. The first single released from that album, it reached No. 14 on the U.S. Billboard Hot 100. In Canada, "Alive Again" spent two weeks at No. 11.

"Alive Again" was Chicago's first new single after their split with producer James William Guercio. It was also their first single after the accidental death of Terry Kath; Donnie Dacus played guitar on the recording, marking his debut work with the band.

== Recording and production ==
James Pankow wrote "Alive Again" on the piano about a romantic relationship and personal rediscovery. Upon looking at a photo of Terry Kath on the wall, a member of the band who had died a short time prior, Pankow arrived at the realization that the song also related to the band's determination to continue after Kath's death. He commented that "if you look behind the boy/girl thing, it can be construed as an encouragement that our phenomenal career would continue."

"Alive Again" was the first song the band recorded for their Hot Streets album, where the sessions were conducted at Criteria Studios in Miami. According to Mike Stahl, Chicago's live audio engineer at the time, he was setting up the microphones for the drum kit when members of Chicago's rhythm section of Robert Lamm, Donnie Dacus, Peter Cetera, and Danny Seraphine came into the studio and started to run-through "Alive Again". During the run-through, Stahl saw the band's producer Phil Ramone mouthing to him to remain still. As such, Stahl forwent miking the two floor toms in Seraphine's kit and held the cables and microphones for the remainder of the jam.

At the conclusion of the initial run-through for "Alive Again", Stahl saw Ramone and one of the audio engineers "slapping hands together and saying how great the 'feel' was for that song." Stahl raised concerns that he had yet to mike the two floor toms and mentioned that the drum track noticeably decreased in volume when Seraphine hit the instruments. Ramone maintained that the band's groove more than sufficiently compensated for the drop-off in volume for the floor toms and ultimately used this run-through as the master take despite recording the rhythm track ten more times. Dacus played the guitar solo with a talk box device.

After the recording of "Alive Again" had been completed, Chicago's brass section recorded with the Bee Gees on their song "Tragedy". Inspired by his work with Barry Gibb, James Pankow re-wrote the brass charts for "Alive Again" and the song was re-recorded. Mike Stahl said the new arrangements gave the song a whole new "feeling" and "sparkle".

== Critical reception ==
Cashbox said it has "aggressive horns, high riding vocals, tight and melodic structure and a bright optimism." They also thought that the song would be a "fine add for various pop formats." Record World wrote that the song "rocks stronger than previous [Chicago] releases with the guitar work and Cetera's lead vocals of prime interest."

Upon its release, Billboard characterized the song as "a horn-dominated rocker not unlike "'Feelin' Stronger Every Day'". The same publication ranked the song 26th on its list of the 50 best Chicago songs in 2019, where they labeled it as a "worthy, bright track" that "showcased the band’s more pop-forward approach".

== Charts ==
=== Weekly charts ===
Chart (1978–1979)	Peak position
Canada RPM Top Singles	11
U.S. Billboard Hot 100	14
U.S. Billboard Adult Contemporary	39
U.S. Cash Box Top 100	13

=== Year-end charts ===
Chart (1978)	Rank
Canada	114

== Popular culture ==
- The opening guitar and horns riff of this song was used in the opening highlights montage by the NBA on CBS from 1979 to 1981.
- An instrumental version was used as the opening theme to the syndicated radio show The Don & Mike Show in 2003.
