= Hot Streets =

1978 studio album by Chicago

- (From left to right); Donnie Dacus, Lee Loughnane, Danny Seraphine, Peter Cetera, James Pankow

Studio album by Chicago
- Released: October 2, 1978
- Recorded: May–June 1978
- Studios: Criteria, Miami; Record Plant, Los Angeles; A&R, New York City
- Genres: Rock; jazz rock; disco
- Length: 41:53
- Label: Columbia
- Producers: Phil Ramone and Chicago

Chicago chronology
Chicago XI (1977)	Hot Streets (1978)	Chicago 13 (1979)

Singles from Hot Streets
- 1. "Alive Again" Released: October 1978; 2. "No Tell Lover" Released: December 1978; 3. "Gone Long Gone" Released: March 1979

Hot Streets is the tenth studio album (and twelfth overall album) by the American rock band Chicago, released on October 2, 1978, by Columbia Records. This was the band's first album with all-new material released since their second that did not have a numbered title. It was also the first album not to feature original guitarist/vocalist and group founder Terry Kath, who died from an accidental self-inflicted gunshot wound in January 1978. He was replaced by Donnie Dacus on this album.

== Background ==
Having worked with James William Guercio since their 1969 debut, Chicago decided to part ways with the producer following the release of Chicago XI in 1977. Another major change for the group was the death of guitarist/vocalist/group founder Terry Kath in January 1978, who accidentally shot himself at a roadie's house while playing with a gun. The members of the band were devastated by his death and considered breaking up. After the initial shock waned, the group decided they still had something to offer musically and carried on.

Phil Ramone, who had mixed some of their earlier albums, was called upon to co-produce their new effort. But before Chicago could begin recording, they had to contend with the difficult process of finding a new guitarist. Accomplished guitarist Donnie Dacus was chosen, bringing his own distinctive style to the group's music. Prior to joining Chicago, Dacus had worked with both Roger McGuinn and Stephen Stills.

Recording sessions took place both in Miami and Los Angeles that spring, after years of working at Guercio's Caribou Ranch in Colorado. By the end of the sessions, the band felt as though they were still in a strong musical position even after the loss of Kath. Some of the tracks featured the Bee Gees and their keyboardist, Blue Weaver, who were recording the album Spirits Having Flown next door at the same Miami studio. The Gibb brothers added vocals to the song "Little Miss Lovin'" while Weaver added synthesized strings to "No Tell Lover" and "Show Me The Way". In turn, Chicago's horn section played on Spirits Having Flown, most notably on the hit singles "Too Much Heaven"and “Tragedy”.

To mark their new beginning, the band broke with tradition by giving their album a title, rather than a number. Having chosen the title Hot Streets, the album cover featured a picture of the band (shot by photographer Norman Seeff) rather than just the group logo. Because a later marketing survey noted that consumers expected to see the logo on the cover, Chicago's logo returned in the form of a high-rise building for the follow-up album, Chicago 13.

The album was released in October 1978, preceded by a release of the lead single "Alive Again". Hot Streets was another hit for the group, who had been concerned that the public might not accept them without Kath. Although the album went platinum, and Chicago scored a second top-twenty hit with "No Tell Lover", Hot Streets was the first Chicago album since their debut that failed to reach the US Top 10; fittingly, the band's twelfth album peaked at #12.

Following the release of Chicago 13 and at the end of the Christmas 1979 tour, Dacus would be released from the group, bringing his short tenure with Chicago to an abrupt end.

In 2003, Hot Streets was remastered and reissued by Rhino Records with an alternate version of Lamm's "Love Was New" sung by Dacus as a bonus track.

== Critical reception ==
Professional ratings
Review scores
Source	Rating
AllMusic	2.5/5 stars
The Rolling Stone Album Guide	2/5 stars

Although unsuccessful commercially, Cash Box said of the single "Gone Long Gone" that the guitar introduction sounds like George Harrison and said that it has "slick harmonies and smooth production" and praised "Donnie Dacus' guitar shadings." Record World said it is "a soft, mid-tempo rocker propelled by Peter Cetera's familiar vocals and some compelling lofty guitar work."

== Track listing ==
Side one
No.	Title	Writer(s)	Vocals	Length
1.	"Alive Again"	James Pankow	Peter Cetera	4:08
2.	"The Greatest Love on Earth"	Danny Seraphine, David "Hawk" Wolinski	Cetera	3:18
3.	"Little Miss Lovin'"	Cetera	Cetera (featuring the Bee Gees)	4:36
4.	"Hot Streets"	Robert Lamm	Lamm	5:20
5.	"Take a Chance"	Lee Loughnane, Lawrence "Stash" Wagner	Donnie Dacus	4:42

Side two
No.	Title	Writer(s)	Vocals	Length
6.	"Gone Long Gone"	Cetera	Cetera	4:00
7.	"Ain't It Time"	Dacus, Seraphine, Warner Schwebke	Dacus, with Cetera	4:12
8.	"Love Was New"	Lamm	Lamm	3:30
9.	"No Tell Lover"	Loughnane, Seraphine, Cetera	Cetera, with Dacus	4:13
10.	"Show Me the Way"	Seraphine, Wolinski	Lamm	3:36

2003 reissue bonus tracks
No.	Title	Writer(s)	Vocals	Length
11.	"Love Was New" (Alternate Vocal)	Lamm	Dacus	3:32

== Personnel ==
=== Chicago ===
- Peter Cetera – bass, lead and backing vocals
- Donnie Dacus – guitars, lead and backing vocals
- Laudir de Oliveira – percussion
- Robert Lamm – keyboards, lead and backing vocals
- Lee Loughnane – trumpet, backing vocals, brass arrangement (8)
- James Pankow – trombone, brass arrangements (1–7, 9–10)
- Walter Parazaider – woodwinds
- Danny Seraphine – drums

=== Additional personnel ===
- Blue Weaver – ARP String Ensemble on "No Tell Lover" and "Show Me The Way"
- David "Hawk" Wolinski – Fender Rhodes on "Show Me The Way"
- Bee Gees – backing vocals on "Little Miss Lovin'"

== Production ==
- Produced by Phil Ramone and Chicago
- Associate Producer – Carol Peters
- Engineered by Jim Boyer, Don Gehman and Lee DeCarlo.
- Assistant Engineers – Peter Lewis, Dave Martone and Kevin Ryan.
- Mixed by Jim Boyer and Phil Ramone
- Mastered by Ted Jensen at Sterling Sound (New York, NY).
- Photography and Design – Norman Seeff
- Logo – Nick Fasciano

== Charts ==
Chart (1978)	Peak position
Australian Albums (Kent Music Report)	14
Canada Top Albums/CDs (RPM)	10
Japanese Albums (Oricon)	52
New Zealand Albums (RMNZ)	9
Norwegian Albums (VG-lista)	7
Swedish Albums (Sverigetopplistan)	23
US Billboard 200	12

== Certifications ==
Region	Certification	Certified units/sales
Canada (Music Canada)	Platinum	100,000^{^}
United States (RIAA)	Platinum	1,000,000^{^}
^{^} Shipments figures based on certification alone.
