= Chris Pinnick =

American guitarist and songwriter

- Born: Christopher Martin Pinnick; July 23, 1953 (age 73); Van Nuys, California
- Genres: Rock, Blues, Jazz
- Occupation: Musician
- Instrument: Guitar
- Years active: 1970s–present
- Formerly of: Chicago

Chris Pinnick (born July 23, 1953) is an American guitarist and songwriter, probably best known for his work with the band Chicago from 1980 to 1985.

Pinnick was born on July 23, 1953, in Van Nuys, California, and took up the guitar at the age of seven. An early example of his guitar work can be heard on Herb Alpert's single "Rise," which reached No. 1 on the Billboard Hot 100 in October 1979.

After guitarist Donnie Dacus left Chicago in 1980, Pinnick was hired as a session musician for the album Chicago XIV. In his biography Street Player, Chicago drummer Danny Seraphine remembers how Pinnick, like [Chicago's] original guitarist Terry Kath, played "guitar with plenty of fire" and had "similar mannerism". Robert Lamm, in an interview given at the time, confirmed that Pinnick's resemblance with Kath was at times "spooky". Pinnick toured and recorded with Chicago from 1981 through 1985. By the time Chicago 17 was released in 1984, Pinnick was listed as a member of the band in the album sleeve notes. However, Pinnick himself is quoted as saying he was never a full-fledged member. He left Chicago in 1985 and was succeeded by Dawayne Bailey the following year.

Pinnick's other recording credits include work for one-time Chicago frontman Peter Cetera, Chuck Negron and Rick Devin. In addition, he’s done session work with Florida/North Carolina-based progressive alternative band, Edison’s Lab, known for their collaborations with multiple members of Yes. In 2001 Pinnick recorded a guitar-oriented album with Chet McCracken called Partners. In 2023 Pinnick released his first solo album, Meanderings. On top of doing session work, Pinnick is also the co-owner and operator of a recording studio in Los Angeles.
