= Baby, What a Big Surprise =

Single by Chicago

from the album Chicago XI
- B-side: "Takin’ It On Uptown"
- Released: September 1977
- Recorded: April – June 1977
- Genre: Soft rock
- Length: 3:04
- Label: Columbia
- Songwriter: Peter Cetera
- Producer: James William Guercio

Chicago singles chronology
"You Are on My Mind" (1977)	"Baby, What a Big Surprise" (1977)	"Little One" (1978)

"Baby, What a Big Surprise" is a ballad written by Chicago's then bassist/singer Peter Cetera, which appeared on their album Chicago XI (1977), with Cetera singing lead vocals. The first single released from the album reached number 4 on the US Billboard Hot 100 chart.

== Background ==
Carl Wilson of The Beach Boys and Cetera's brother, Tim Cetera, provided additional backing vocals on the recording while saxophonist Walt Parazaider plays flute on the distinctive introduction and trumpeter Lee Loughnane plays a piccolo trumpet.

Although Chicago XI yielded two more minor singles, "Baby, What a Big Surprise" was Chicago's last top ten single before the accidental death of guitarist Terry Kath, and was also their last Top Ten single produced by James William Guercio.

== Reception ==
Cash Box said that "frequent repetition drives the memorable chorus home, while classically influenced strings, brass and vocals lend a stately touch." Record World said that "the interesting structure and chorus hook" explain why the song was a popular song on pop music radio stations even before it was released as a single.

== Chart performance ==
=== Weekly charts ===
Chart (1977–78)	Peak position
Australia (Kent Music Report)	14
Austria (Ö3 Austria Top 40)	9
Belgium (Ultratop 50 Flanders)	24
Belgium (Ultratop 50 Wallonia)	32
Canada RPM Top Singles	3
Canada RPM Adult Contemporary	7
France (IFOP)	38
Netherlands (Single Top 100)	4
New Zealand (Recorded Music NZ)	19
Sweden (Sverigetopplistan)	12
Switzerland (Schweizer Hitparade)	19
UK	41
US Billboard Hot 100	4
US Adult Contemporary (Billboard)	8
US Cash Box Top 100	4
West Germany (GfK)	49

=== Year-end charts ===
Chart (1977)	Rank
Australia	119
Canada	58
US (Joel Whitburn's Pop Annual)	59

== Cover versions ==
- Cetera re-recorded the song as a solo artist for his 1997 album You're the Inspiration: A Collection.
