= Kenny Dope =

American record producer and disc jockey

Kenny "Dope" Gonzalez
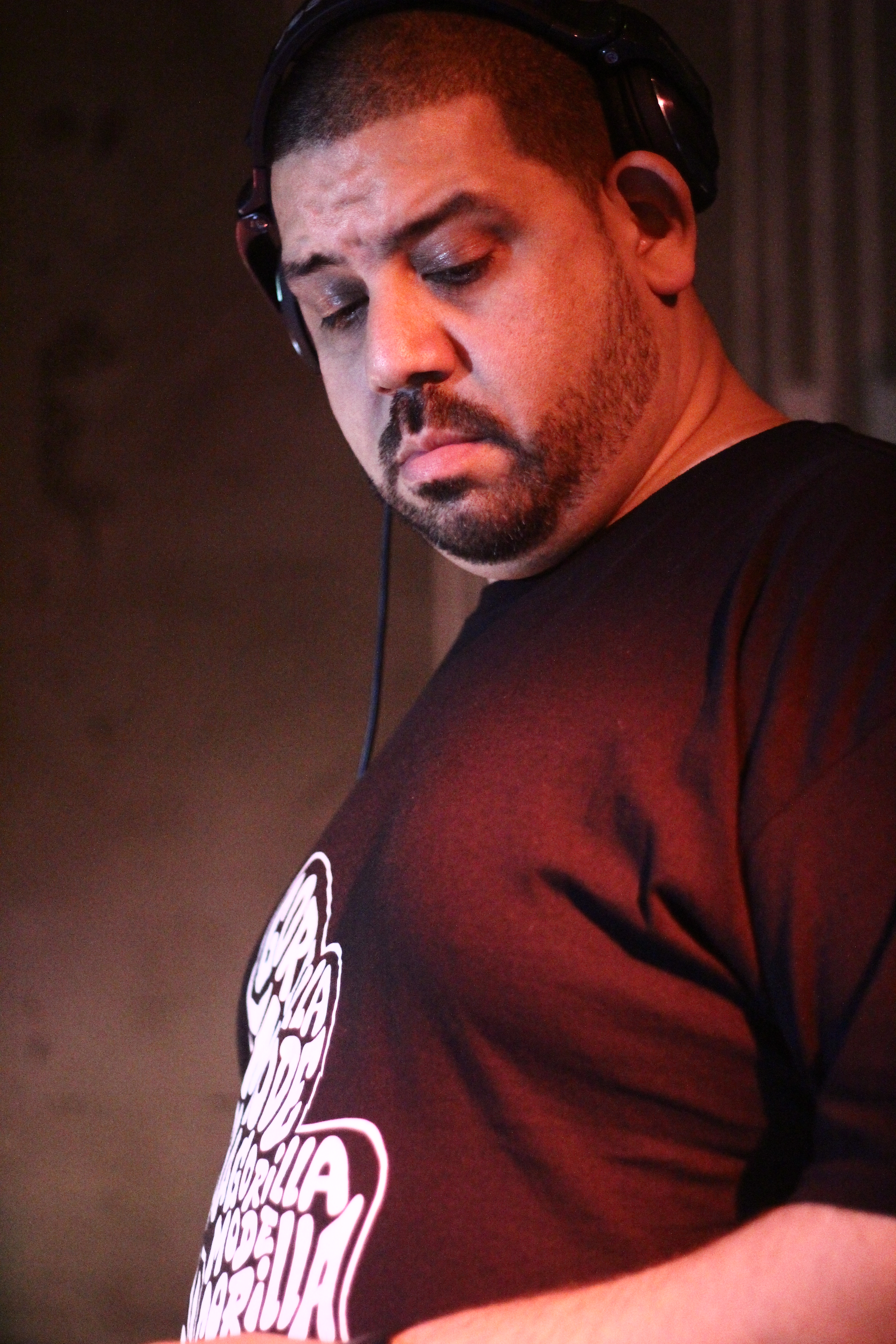
- Gonzalez in 2014

Background information
- Born: June 7, 1970 (age 56)
- Origin: Brooklyn, New York, United States
- Genres: Electronic; house
- Occupations: DJ, producer
- Years active: 1985–present
- Labels: Positiva Records (1990-present); MAW Records (1998-present)

Kenny "Dope" Gonzalez (born June 7, 1970), also sometimes known as K-Dope, is an American record producer and disc jockey. He is one half of the classic house music Masters at Work musical production team with Little Louie Vega; and also released the hit "The Bomb! (These Sounds Fall into My Mind)" as the Bucketheads.

== Biography ==
Gonzalez started his DJ career in 1985 organizing neighborhood block parties in his home of Brooklyn, New York, with his then musical partner, Mike Delgado. Under the Masters at Work moniker, the parties became quite successful and attracted Todd Terry who later borrowed the group's name for two record releases. Terry returned the favor at a later date when he loaned Gonzalez a drum machine, which began his interest in producing beats. Kenny Dope was one of the DJs for the group KAOS whose 1988 album Court's in Session featured production by Todd Terry.

== Discography ==
- All in the Mind (1995), as The Bucketheads
