= If You Leave Me Now =

1976 single by Chicago

- German picture sleeve

Single by Chicago

from the album Chicago X
- B-side: "Together Again"
- Released: July 30, 1976
- Recorded: March – April 1976
- Genre: Soft rock; pop
- Length: 3:58
- Label: Columbia
- Songwriter: Peter Cetera
- Producer: James William Guercio

Chicago singles chronology
"Another Rainy Day in New York City" (1976)	"If You Leave Me Now" (1976)	"You Are on My Mind" (1977)

"If You Leave Me Now" is a song by the American rock group Chicago, from their album Chicago X. It was written and sung by bass player Peter Cetera and released as a single on July 30, 1976. It is also the title of a Chicago compilation album released by Columbia Records (Columbia 38590) in 1983.

The single topped the Billboard Hot 100 on October 23, 1976, and stayed there for two weeks, making it the first number one hit for the group. It hit the number one on the Easy Listening charts and was also Chicago's biggest hit internationally, topping the charts in other countries such as the UK, Australia, Ireland, Canada, and Netherlands. In the UK, it maintained the number one position for three weeks. It was one of five "non-disco" songs to make it to number one in the US in a nine-month period of 1976. According to writer Zachary Houle of PopMatters, "The song was so pervasive on radio upon its release that, reportedly, those tuning in in New York could hear the song playing on four different stations, each with varying formats, simultaneously."

The song won Grammy Awards for Best Arrangement Accompanying Vocalist(s) (strings) for arranger Jimmie Haskell and producer James William Guercio and Best Pop Vocal Performance by a Duo, Group or Chorus, the first Grammy Award won by the group. It also received a Grammy nomination for Record of the Year. In addition, by August 1978 it had sold 1.4 million copies in the United States alone. It has been certified gold and platinum by the RIAA.

In 2010, Chicago teamed with the American Cancer Society and offered the opportunity to bid on the chance to sing their hit, "If You Leave Me Now" with them on stage live at their concerts, with proceeds going to the American Cancer Society to fight breast cancer. The fundraising effort has continued in succeeding years.

== Composition and recording ==
Peter Cetera originally wrote "If You Leave Me Now" at the same time as Chicago VII's "Wishing You Were Here", and composed it on a guitar. In the lyrics, the singer is trying to stop his loved one from breaking up with him. "How can we end it all this way?" he asks. According to information on the sheet music for the song at MusicNotes, "If You Leave Me Now" is written in the key of B major, and Cetera's vocal range varies between F sharp 3 (F♯_{3}) and D sharp 5 (D♯_{5}).

Band manager James William Guercio initially played acoustic guitar on the demo version of the track, figuring that regular guitarist Terry Kath would record the proper part when he was in the studio next. However, the band decided that Guercio's part sounded satisfactory and consequently left that effort on the record. In the 1991 booklet that accompanied Chicago's compilation album, Group Portrait, Peter Cetera recollected to writer William James Ruhlmann that the song was recorded live, with the group's musicians playing together – Cetera singing, James Guercio on acoustic guitar, Terry Kath on bass guitar, Robert Lamm on piano, and Danny Seraphine on drums – and that his vocal was "done over" and that Kath later overdubbed electric guitar parts. Walter Parazaider recalled that he heard the song on the radio while cleaning his pool and initially thought "it sounded like McCartney," not realizing it was his own band's work.

== Promotion and marketing ==
The Chicago X album art depicted a partially unwrapped chocolate bar bearing the Chicago logo. In the same vein, the single, "If You Leave Me Now", was depicted as a chocolate "kiss" from the album in a full-page advertisement in Cash Box magazine.

== Reception ==
Cash Box said that it's "an excellent ballad," with "lushly colored" instrumentation and "carefully constructed" vocals. Record World called it "a good single choice" with a "strong vocal line." In an article from June 2020, The Guardian listed "If You Leave Me Now" as number 73 on its list of "The Greatest UK No 1s: 100–1", noting, "It’s impossibly lush and beautifully written, but its sadness is pervasive and affecting."

Upon the group's induction into the Rock and Roll Hall of Fame in 2016, entertainment and pop culture writer Troy L. Smith included "If You Leave Me Now" in his list of seven Chicago songs that "kill any doubt about their candidacy", and said, "... it's a key contributor to the band's fame and, thus, its Rock Hall induction. And while we're being honest, Peter Cetera delivers, hands down, the best vocal performance of any Chicago song."

== Charts ==
=== Weekly charts ===
Chart (1976–1977)	Peak position
Australian Singles Chart	1
Austrian Singles Chart	3
Belgian Singles Chart (Flanders)	2
Canada Top Singles (RPM)	1
Canada RPM Adult Contemporary	4
Dutch Singles Chart	1
French Singles Chart	5
German Singles Chart	3
Ireland (IRMA)	1
Italy (Musica e Dischi)	3
Norwegian Singles Chart	4
New Zealand Singles Chart	2
South Africa (Springbok)	1
Swedish Singles Chart	2
Swiss Singles Chart	3
UK Singles Chart	1
US Billboard Hot 100	1
US Easy Listening (Billboard)	1
US Cash Box Top 100	1

=== Year-end charts ===
Chart (1976)	Rank
Australia (Kent Music Report)	21
Canada Top Singles (RPM)	9
New Zealand	24
UK	6
US Billboard Hot 100	48
US Easy Listening (Billboard)	15
US Cash Box Top 100	14

Chart (1977)	Rank
Australia (Kent Music Report)	10
South Africa	11
Switzerland	12

== Certifications ==
Region	Certification	Certified units/sales
Canada (Music Canada)	Gold	75,000^{^}
Denmark (IFPI Danmark)	Gold	45,000^{‡}
New Zealand (RMNZ)	Platinum	30,000^{‡}
Spain (Promusicae)	Platinum	60,000^{‡}
United Kingdom (BPI)	Platinum	600,000^{‡}
United States (RIAA)	Platinum	1,000,000^{^}
^{^} Shipments figures based on certification alone.^{‡} Sales+streaming figures based on certification alone.

== Chess version ==
"If You Leave Me Now"

Single by Chess
- Released: February 1, 1993
- Recorded: 1992
- Genre: Dance
- Length: 3:53
- Label: BMG
- Songwriter: Peter Cetera
- Producers: Boogie Park, Brothers United

In 1992, German music group Chess covered the song which achieved modest success. While the original is a ballad, Chess's version is uptempo and danceable, adapted to the state of dance music of the 1990s. Their version is also on the compilations Larry präsentiert: Neue Smash-Hits 93 (English: Larry presents: New Smash-Hits 93) and Maxi Dance Sensation 9.

=== Track listing ===
CD maxi-single

1. If You Leave Me Now (Airplay Mix) - 3:53
2. If You Leave Me Now (12" After Dark Mix) - 5:13
3. Please, Don't Leave Me (Instrumental Mystery Mix) - 5:16

=== Charts ===
Chart (1993)	Peak position
German Singles Chart	67

== Other cover versions ==
Peter Cetera re-recorded "If You Leave Me Now" as a solo artist for his 1997 album You're the Inspiration: A Collection, and most recently recorded a duet version of the song with Italian vocalist, Filippa Giordano, for her 2018 album, Friends and Legends Duets.

The website SecondHandSongs lists over 130 covers of "If You Leave Me Now" by recording artists from around the world between 1976 and 2020, among them:

- Brotherhood of Man included it on their 1980 album Sing 20 Number One Hits. The album peaked at No. 14 on the UK charts in 1980.
- Elkie Brooks released a version of the song on her album Pearls in 1981. The album reached No. 2 in the UK.
- Upside Down, a British boy band, released a version as a single, which charted at number 27 in the UK in 1996.
- The Isley Brothers recorded it for their 2001 album Eternal.
- 3T recorded a duet of the song with Brazilian girl group T-Rio in 2004. It was released as a non-album single.
- Suzy Bogguss recorded it for her 2007 album Sweet Danger. The Billboard review labeled her version "familiar and fresh."
- John Barrowman recorded a version for his 2007 album Another Side.
- Boyz II Men recorded their version of "If You Leave Me Now" for their 2009 album Love. They also sang on an unrelated Charlie Puth song with the same title in 2018.
- Viola Wills released a disco version of "If You Leave Me Now" which was released as a single in 1981, with "I Can't Stay Away from You" on the B-side. Her version was sampled by French electronic music duo Daft Punk for the songs "Teachers" and "Fresh", which appear on their 1997 album Homework.
- Leonid and Friends on Chicagovich.
- Elastic Band released a version of the song on their album Get It Out! in 1992.
- Shunza sang her version of the song on her 2001 album 昨日 . 唯一 . 更多 = Yesterday. One. More.
- Khalil Fong also recorded a soul cover of the song in his second Mandarin album This Love in 2006.

British DJ, producer, songwriter and former member of the Outlaw Posse, K-Gee, together with Michelle Escoffery performed a hip hop version of "If You Leave Me Now" for K-Gee's 2002 album, Bounce to This. In 2000, K-Gee told Billboard writer Kwaku that he thought the chorus of "If You Leave Me Now" "sounds phat".

=== Live cover performances ===
- Philip Bailey of Earth, Wind & Fire sang the song during their joint concerts with Chicago in 2004–2006. This version was included in the Love Songs album by Chicago. Philip Bailey also performed the song during the "Grammy Salute to Music Legends 2020" to honor Chicago who received the Grammy Lifetime Achievement Award that year. The program premiered on PBS on October 16, 2020.

== In other media ==
"If You Leave Me Now" is featured on the soundtrack of the video game Grand Theft Auto V, appearing on the in-game radio station Los Santos Rock Radio, and is also played when Trevor Philips returns the kidnapped wife of a drug kingpin. The song is also featured in the episodes, "Casa Bonita" and "Awesom-O", of South Park, as well as "Egg Drop", the 12th episode of the third season of the American sitcom Modern Family. The song was also featured in a scene of the British comedy horror film Shaun of the Dead where Shaun is still reeling from his breakup while Ed is trying to cheer him up asking "who the bloody hell put this on?". In the early 2000s, the song was performed by the mascot "Sockpuppet" in a commercial for the now-defunct website Pets.com. "If You Leave Me Now" was part of the soundtrack for the 1999 film Three Kings, which is set in Iraq during the 1991 Gulf War. Desson Howe, reviewing the film for The Washington Post, notes how film director David O. Russell cuts from the "frenzied din of confusion" outside a moving car in the scene to the interior of the car, where the "easy sounds" of the song are playing. The song was also featured in the 2023 film The Flash, an installment in the DC Extended Universe. The song is featured in the season 6 episode "Boy, Interrupted" of the HBO show Sex and the City. It plays at the end of the episode when Carrie attends the Gay and Lesbian Prom. In 2025, it was also featured in the Brazilian film The Secret Agent, and in 2026, it was featured in the DC Universe film Clayface.

In the HBO miniseries The Regime, the dictator portrayed by Kate Winslet sings a "cringy" rendition of "If You Leave Me Now" in the initial episode which first aired on March 3, 2024. In an interview with Patrick Ryan of USA Today, Winslet discussed the song selection: "It's such a great metaphor ... I thought that song choice was very much to do with her trying to express her gratitude for her loyal followers. It's a fantastic play on the world of 'likes,' and how she's a leader by social media more than anything." In the same article, series creator Will Tracey said the song was written into the very first draft, "I was trying to think of an American song that might've hit the airwaves in Europe when she was a kid: something seemingly innocuous and maudlin and soft rock. But I always felt there's something in that rising hook in the melody; there's a sadness contained in a lot of those seemingly vacuous radio ballads. So it seemed like the right song to mine for a ridiculous moment at the top of the show." In the fall of 2024, the song was used in TV commercials for Canadian Tire in Canada.

== See also ==
- List of number-one singles in Australia during the 1970s
- List of Dutch Top 40 number-one singles of 1976
- List of number-one singles from the 1970s (UK)
- List of Hot 100 number-one singles of 1976 (U.S.)
- List of number-one adult contemporary singles of 1976 (U.S.)
- List of European number-one hits of 1977
