= Hawk Wolinski =

American musician (born 1948)

- Born: David James Wolinski; May 13, 1948 (age 77)
- Genres: Rock, film score
- Occupations: Keyboardist, songwriter, record producer, composer

David James "Hawk" Wolinski (born May 13, 1948) is an American keyboardist, songwriter and record producer, best known for his work with the funk band Rufus and their lead singer Chaka Khan.

== Biography ==
Born May 13, 1948, Wolinski grew up in Chicago, and in the late 1960s, was the keyboard player and lead singer of the band the Males, and a member of The Shadows of Knight and Bangor Flying Circus. When the latter band broke up he helped form Madura, which was produced by fellow Chicagoan James William Guercio. Guercio used Madura in his 1973 film Electra Glide in Blue.

In the 1960s, Wolinski formed a short-lived band in Chicago called the Electric Band. They played regularly at a club called The Cellar.

In the late 1970s, Wolinski joined Rufus as a keyboardist and songwriter. He co-wrote or solely wrote their songs "Hollywood", "Street Player" (later recorded by co-writer Danny Seraphine's band Chicago), "Everlasting Love" (not to be confused with the Robert Knight hit of the same title), "Do You Love What You Feel", and the 1983 hit single "Ain't Nobody", which reached No. 1 on the US Billboard R&B chart.

He started a production company, named Street Sense Productions, in partnership with Danny Seraphine. They used Seraphine's home studio to record the demos. A deal was signed with Epic Records.

Wolinski has worked with numerous other artists as musician, songwriter or producer, including the Bee Gees, Glenn Frey, Michael Jackson, Danny Seraphine, Beverley Knight, Jeffrey Osborne, Millions Like Us, Stephanie Mills and Minnie Riperton.

He is known for composing individual songs for film soundtracks, including Cobra, Wildcats and Beavis and Butt-Head Do America.

He has also had small acting roles in the films Electra Glide in Blue and Men at Work, the 1990 comedy film with Emilio Estevez and Charlie Sheen.
