= Donnie Dacus =

American musician and actor (born 1951)

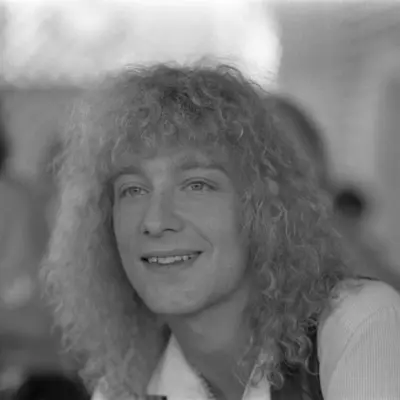
- Dacus in 1979

Background information
- Born: James O. Dacus; October 12, 1951 (age 75); Cleburne, Texas, United States
- Genres: Pop rock; folk rock; blues rock
- Occupations: Musician; guitarist; vocalist; songwriter; actor; record producer
- Instruments: Guitar; vocals
- Formerly of: Chicago

James O. "Donnie" Dacus (born October 12, 1951) is an American guitarist, vocalist, actor, songwriter, and producer. He has been a member of the rock bands Chicago and Badfinger.

== Early life ==
Dacus grew up in Cleburne, Texas. By the age of 14, he was teaching guitar in the local music store and playing with a local band he organized called The Chantels. Eventually, the band changed its name to The Shux and won the Battle of the Bands in Dallas, Texas. Dacus was subsequently managed by the Beard Brothers out of Fort Worth, Texas. Dacus received his big break when he was discovered by the band The Yellow Payges in 1968 during a concert with Buffalo Springfield and The Beach Boys.

== Career ==
Dacus has contributed to a number of artists' albums that went Gold, Platinum, and Multi-platinum as a singer, songwriter, and guitarist.

Prior to his breakthrough with Chicago, Dacus starred as Woof Dachshund in the film version of Hair, co-starring Treat Williams, Beverly D'Angelo, Annie Golden, and John Savage, and directed by Academy Award winner Miloš Forman. Hair opened the Cannes Film Festival in 1979 and was nominated for two Golden Globe Awards and was a box office success. Dacus' parts were filmed in late 1977.

Dacus was hired by Chicago in April 1978 a few months after the death of founding member, guitarist/vocalist Terry Kath. The first album he appeared on was Hot Streets, which went to No. 12 and became platinum. He also was in the lineup for Chicago 13. After the 1979 tour in support of Chicago 13, he was released from the band without an announcement, but a variety of sources state that it just wasn't a good personality and musical fit and they had differing opinions on career direction. It was the start of a period of personnel changes for Chicago.

Dacus has worked and performed with a number of notable musicians, including Billy Joel; Boz Scaggs; Crosby, Stills, & Nash; Neil Young; Stephen Stills (solo); John Lennon; Elvin Bishop; REO Speedwagon; Steve Cropper; Kiki Dee; Elton John; Chicago; The Turtles; Roger McGuinn; Badfinger; Bobby Womack; Edoardo Bennato; Mac Davis; Veronique Sanson; Bonnie Bramlett; Deep Purple; Ambrosia; Orleans; Berry Gordy of Motown's MoWest label group Odyssey; Rick James; Spirit; and Chris Hillman.

Dacus has performed at major concert venues such as The Hollywood Bowl, Carnegie Hall, Kennedy Center, the Greek Theatre, Dick Clark Live, Pine Knob Music Festival, Merriweather Post Pavilion, Tanglewood, A Week In Central Park, Dr. Pepper Stage, King Biscuit's Concert Hour, Don Kirshner's Rock Concert, Midnight Special, The Olympia in Paris and Summerfest in Milwaukee, and Navy Pier at ChicagoFest, where more than 150,000 people attended. Dacus appeared on the front page of the Chicago Tribune and the cover of People magazine during his tenure with the group Chicago, who garnered the Hollywood Walk of Fame award.

Dacus’ background vocals may be heard on the 1978 Billy Joel song "My Life" alongside his former Chicago bandmate Peter Cetera.

In 1982, Dacus joined Badfinger with Tom Evans, Mike Gibbins, and Bob Jackson, plus Reed Kailing, who had been lead guitarist with the Grass Roots.

In 2016, Dacus returned to the spotlight after years away from the music industry by reuniting with several former bandmates. In January 2016, he appeared as a guest guitarist alongside former Chicago vocalist and bassist Peter Cetera at a concert at Magic City in Miami, Florida. In April 2016, Dacus appeared as a special guest guitarist alongside former Chicago drummer Danny Seraphine and former Chicago percussionist Laudir de Oliveira, in a performance following Chicago's 2016 induction into the Rock and Roll Hall of Fame.
