= Chicago XXXVIII: Born for This Moment =

Studio album by Chicago
- Released: July 15, 2022
- Length: 57:26
- Label: BMG
- Producer: Joe Thomas

Chicago chronology
Chicago XXXVII: Chicago Christmas (2019)	Chicago XXXVIII: Born for This Moment (2022)	Chicago Greatest Christmas Hits (2023)

Singles from Chicago XXXVIII: Born for This Moment
- 1. "If This Is Goodbye" Released: May 20, 2022

Chicago XXXVIII: Born for This Moment is the twenty-sixth studio album by the American rock band Chicago and its thirty-eighth album overall. Released on July 15, 2022, it is its first new album of original material since 2014's Chicago XXXVI: Now. "If This Is Goodbye" was released as a single on May 20, 2022.

== Production ==
According to Robert Lamm, the impetus for the album came from his collaborations with Jim Peterik, of the Ides of March, and Bruce Gaitsch during the COVID-19 pandemic in 2020 and 2021. Producer Joe Thomas heard through Peterik about their work and asked Lamm if Chicago would be interested in a recording project.

When asked about the difference in the musical approach of the band for this album, Lamm said, "First of all, there are only three members [Lamm, Pankow, and Loughnane] who are calling the shots. The rest of the band are great guys, contracted players, top-notch guys. It wasn't as free-flowing as I thought it should be. That's the biggest change now."

== Reception ==
Professional ratings
Review scores
Source	Rating
AllMusic	2.5/5 stars

Gary Graff of Ultimate Classic Rock wrote that the album "hews to the middle of the road, with plenty of pop melodies and Chicago's trademark brass arrangements [...] But more than anything the 14-track set [...] marks the real arrival of singer and guitarist Neil Donell". Graff concluded that though it "has its cringe-y moments [it still] has enough hallmarks to engage any longtime fan for a moment, if not longer".

== Track listing ==
No.	Title	Writer(s)	Length
1.	"Born for This Moment"	Robert Lamm; Jim Peterik	4:50
2.	"If This Is Goodbye"	Christopher Baran; Brandon Lowry; Ben Romans; Joe Thomas	3:49
3.	"Firecracker"	Greg O'Connor; James Pankow	3:50
4.	"Someone Needed Me the Most"	O'Connor; Pankow; Dennis Spiegel	5:17
5.	"Our New York Time"	Lamm; Peterik; Thomas	4:16
6.	"Safer Harbours"	Neil Donell	4:53
7.	"Crazy Idea"	Lamm; Peterik	3:17
8.	"Make a Man Outta Me"	Keith Howland; Pankow	4:14
9.	"She's Right"	Michael Burns; Lamm; Thomas; Ramon Yslas	3:46
10.	""The Mermaid" (Sereia Do Mar)"	Lamm; Marcos Valle	3:34
11.	"You've Got to Believe"	Baran; Romans; Thomas	3:12
12.	"For the Love"	Bruce Gaitsch; Lamm	4:02
13.	"If This Isn't Love"	John Durill; Lee Loughnane	4:38
14.	"House on the Hill"	John Van Eps; Lamm	3:48
Total length:			57:26

== Personnel ==
=== Chicago ===
- Robert Lamm – lead vocals (2, 5, 9, 10, 12, 14), keyboards and programming (1, 5, 7, 10, 12, 14), bass guitar (1, 7, 10, 14), acoustic bass guitar (12), background vocals (1–3, 5–7, 9, 11, 12)
- Lee Loughnane – trumpet (1–11, 13), guitar, synthesizer bass, and background vocals (13), brass arrangement (13)
- James Pankow – trombone (1–13), brass arrangements (1–9, 11), keyboards (8), trombone solo (10)
- Walfredo Reyes Jr. – drums (1, 3–5, 7–11, 13, 14)
- Ray Herrmann – saxophone (1–11, 13), flute solos (14)
- Neil Donell – lead vocals (1–4, 6–8, 11, 13), background vocals (1–9, 11–13)
- Ramon "Ray" Yslas – percussion (1, 3–5, 7–10, 12, 14)
- Loren Gold – piano (13)
- Keith Howland – guitars (8, 13), additional keyboards (8), electric guitar (9)^{[a]}
- Lou Pardini – background vocals (1, 3, 8)^{[a]}
- Brett Simons – bass guitar (2–5, 8, 9, 13)^{[a]}

=== Additional ===
- David Angell – violin (5, 10, 12)
- Mike Aquino – electric guitar (5, 11)
- CJ Baran – keyboards, programming, and additional vocals (2, 11), synthesizers (11)
- Brian Barlow – percussion (6)
- Kevin Bate – cello (5, 10, 12)
- David Blamires – background vocals (6)
- Tom Bukovac – guitar solos on 3, 5 and 9, electric guitar (5), additional guitars (3, 9)
- Chris Cameron – Hammond B3 organ (3, 7)
- David Davidson – violin (5, 10, 12)
- Richie Davis – electric guitar (3), guitar (7)
- Simbret Dorch – background vocals (3)
- Michael Francis – acoustic and electric guitars (6)
- Simon Fryer – cello (6)
- Bruce Gaitsch – guitars (12)
- David R Hetherington – cello (6)
- Tim Jessup – synthesizer programming and guitar (13)
- Bobby Kimball – guest vocals (4)
- Audrey King – cello (6)
- Desislava Kondova – violin solo (12)
- Hank Linderman – guitars (1, 10, 14), acoustic and twelve-string guitars (5), additional guitars (12), background vocals (5)
- Guido Luciani – additional guitar (6)
- Kevan McKenzie – drums (6)
- Greg O'Connor – keyboards, programming and arrangements (3, 4)
- Ray Parker – piano (6)
- Rich Patterson – bass guitar (3, 12)
- Joanna Pearl – background vocals (10)
- Jim Peterik – guitars (1, 7), keyboards and additional guitars (5)
- Tim Pierce – acoustic and electric guitars (4)
- Ben Romans – keyboard and programming (2, 11), synthesizers (11)
- John Rutledge – background vocals (6)
- Lori Smith – background vocals (3)
- Tom Szczesniak – bass guitar (6), cello arrangement (6)
- Joe Thomas – background vocals (2, 3, 5, 9, 11, 12), synthesizers (2, 5, 7, 10), keyboards (5, 9), acoustic piano (5), bass guitar (11), B3 organ (9), Höfner bass (2), organ (3), additional keyboards (3, 11), additional guitars (9), additional synthesizer (13), string arrangements (1, 5, 12)
- John Van Eps – string arrangements (10, 14)
- Paul Widner – cello (6)
- Kristin Wilkinson – string arrangements (1, 5, 12), viola/leader (5, 10, 12)

== Chart performance ==
Chart (2022)	Peak position
US Top Album Sales (Billboard)	21

== Notes ==
^[a] Howland, Pardini, and Simons were members of the band during recording, but left prior to the album's release.
