= Chicago XXXVII: Chicago Christmas =

Studio album by Chicago
- Released: October 11, 2019
- Genres: Rock; Christmas
- Length: 43:40
- Label: Rhino
- Producer: Lee Loughnane

Chicago chronology
Chicago: Greatest Hits Live (2018)	Chicago XXXVII: Chicago Christmas (2019)	Chicago XXXVIII: Born for This Moment (2022)

Chicago XXXVII: Chicago Christmas, also known as simply Chicago Christmas, is the twenty-fifth studio album, the fourth collection of Christmas songs, and thirty-seventh album overall by the American rock band Chicago. The album was released on October 11, 2019. The project grew out of a plan to record a few new bonus tracks for a re-release of one of the band's prior holiday albums. Unlike previous Christmas albums, Chicago Christmas features primarily original material, written by members of the band. The only non-original songs on the album are "What the World Needs Now Is Love", "Sleigh Ride (2019)", and "Here We Come a Caroling". Chicago Christmas reached number one on the Billboard Holiday Albums Sales Chart.

Chicago Christmas reflects several personnel changes in the band's lineup since their previous studio release from 2014, Chicago XXXVI: Now. This is their first studio album for singer Neil Donell and bassist Brett Simons. It is also the first studio album since Walfredo Reyes Jr. moved from percussion to drums, with his previous position being filled by Ramon Yslas. Additionally, this is the first Chicago album since the 2017 retirement of saxophonist Walter Parazaider, who was replaced by Ray Herrmann.

== Track listing ==
Chicago XXXVII: Chicago Christmas track listing
No.	Title	Writer(s)	Length
1.	"(Because) It's Christmastime"	Billy Hinsche, Robert Lamm	3:20
2.	"All Over the World"	Don Breithaupt, Neil Donell	4:18
3.	"Bring My Baby Back"	John Durrill, Lee Loughnane	4:03
4.	"Merry Christmas, I Love You" (R&B version)	Durrill, Loughnane	4:13
5.	"What the World Needs Now Is Love"	Burt Bacharach, Hal David	3:30
6.	"All Is Right"	Michael James Burns, Ramon Yslas	4:02
7.	"Sleigh Ride" (2019)	Leroy Anderson, Mitchell Parish	3:16
8.	"I'd Do It All Again (Christmas Moon)"	Lamm, Lou Pardini	4:58
9.	"I'm Your Santa Claus"	James Pankow, Lilli Pankow	4:48
10.	"Here We Come a Caroling/We Wish You a Merry Christmas"	Traditional	3:05
11.	"Merry Christmas, I Love You" (ballad version)	Durrill, Loughnane	4:07
Total length:			43:40

== Personnel ==
Adapted from the album liner notes.

Chicago

- Robert Lamm – keyboards, lead and backing vocals, horn arrangements
- Lee Loughnane – trumpet, backing vocals
- James Pankow – trombone, backing vocals, horn arrangements
- Keith Howland – guitars, backing vocals
- Lou Pardini – keyboards, lead and backing vocals
- Walfredo Reyes Jr. – drums, percussion
- Ray Herrmann – saxophones, flute, clarinet, backing vocals, horn arrangements
- Neil Donell – lead and backing vocals
- Brett Simons – bass, backing vocals
- Ramon Yslas – percussion

Additional musicians

- Nick Lane – horn arrangements
- Tim Jessup – string arrangements

== Production ==
- Lee Loughnane – producer
- Tim Jessup – recording, mixing
- Scott Koopmann – basic track recording
- Adam Ayan – mastering
- Matthew Pardini – cover artwork

== Charts ==
Chart performance of Chicago XXXVII: Chicago Christmas
Chart (2019)	Peak position
US Top Album Sales (Billboard)	72
US Top Holiday Albums (Billboard)	8
