= Chicago XXXVI: Now =

Studio album by Chicago
- Released: July 4, 2014
- Recorded: 2013–2014
- Genre: Rock
- Length: 50:27
- Label: Frontiers
- Producers: Chicago, Hank Linderman

Chicago chronology
Chicago XXXV: The Nashville Sessions (2013)	Chicago XXXVI: Now (2014)	Chicago at Symphony Hall (2015)

Chicago XXXVI: Now, sometimes stylized as "NOW" Chicago XXXVI or Now: Chicago XXXVI, is the twenty-fourth studio album, and thirty-sixth overall by Chicago, an American rock band. It was written and recorded in 2013 and 2014, and released on July 4, 2014. Now is the band's first full album of new compositions since 2006's Chicago XXX, not including Chicago XXXII: Stone of Sisyphus, which was released in 2008 but recorded in 1993; and notwithstanding the occasional new tracks released in the band's many compilation and cover albums.

This album has the first original Chicago credits for veteran musicians Walfredo Reyes, Jr. and Lou Pardini, since joining the band. It is also the last album with bassist and vocalist Jason Scheff before his departure in 2016. It entered the US Billboard 200 at number 82.

== Production ==
The album was produced in a geographically distributed, "just-in-time" fashion. Noted by the band's cofounder Robert Lamm as "a very sort of disjointed way to work", Now's production model was largely enabled by a fully mobile system of the band's own design called "The Rig". It was recorded primarily in hotels and secondarily in studios along the band's American tour, constructed mostly from each musician's isolated performances between concert dates, and then synchronized via a private Web portal site for final overdubbing by coordinating producer and engineer Hank Linderman. The band's songwriting members are each respectively credited as each track's "supervising producer".

During the album's year-long development, audio preview clips of each track were released to the public online — some before they were completed by the addition of the band's signature brass section. The first preview, "Naked in the Garden of Allah", was released in April 2013. The album was made available for preorder in April 2014 and released July 2014.

The ultimate goal was to make music — and now we're doing that. We're going to see how far we can go with this. Thank goodness we have 46 years of track record behind us. We're just trying to grow the legacy even more.

— Chicago cofounder, Lee Loughnane, on Now

== Reception ==
Professional ratings
Review scores
Source	Rating
AllMusic	3.5/5 stars

Beginning in April 2013, the Something Else! webzine reviewed the band's preview clips. They said that "Naked in the Garden of Allah" "reanimates" the band's early "cutting" political messages, wherein "the lyrics, and the song's turbulent textures, speak to both the horrors of war and to Lamm's enduring pleas for peace". "Watching All the Colors" was said to resemble Robert Lamm's 2008 solo sessions from The Bossa Project, and "Something's Coming, I Know" "rumbles along with a more scuffed-up cadence — until it's broken up by this sun-streaked, Beatlesque bridge". Recorded on the tour bus, Tris Imboden's drums on "Crazy Happy" are said to "sound modern and appropriate for the song and mesh seamlessly". They complement the album's percussion, as provided by "the great Walfredo Reyes Jr."

AllMusic's Stephen Erlewine rated the album 3.5 stars out of 5, calling it "united in sound and sensibility, anchored upon the splashy horn-fueled jazz-pop they pioneered in the '70s but usually returning to the slick professional adult contemporary of the '80s", with songs that are "big, smooth, cheerful, and bright, emphasizing melody over instrumental interplay, explicitly evoking the past without re-creating it".

== Track listing ==
No.	Title	Writer(s)	Lead vocals	Length
1.	"Now"	Jason Scheff, Greg Barnhill	Jason Scheff with Robert Lamm and Lou Pardini	5:03
2.	"More Will Be Revealed"	Lamm, Phil Galdston	Lamm with Pardini	5:11
3.	"America"	Lee Loughnane	Pardini	4:04
4.	"Crazy Happy"	Jason Scheff, Lamm	Lamm with Scheff	5:02
5.	"Free at Last"	Keith Howland, Tris Imboden, Lamm	Lamm	5:13
6.	"Love Lives On"	Barnhill, Scheff, James Pankow	Scheff	5:21
7.	"Something's Coming, I Know"	Gerry Beckley, Lamm	Lamm with Loughnane	3:48
8.	"Watching All the Colors"	Lamm, Lou Pardini	Pardini	4:15
9.	"Nice Girl"	Howland, Imboden, Scheff	Keith Howland with Scheff	4:02
10.	"Naked in the Garden of Allah"	Lamm, Hank Linderman	Lamm	4:24
11.	"Another Trippy Day"	John Van Eps, Lamm	Lamm with Pardini	4:04

== Personnel ==
Chicago

- Robert Lamm – keyboards (2, 4, 5, 7, 8), horn arrangements (2, 4, 7, 8, 11), synthesizer (3), synth guitar (8), programming (10), lead vocals (1, 2, 4, 5, 7, 10, 11), backing vocals (1, 3), arrangements
- Lee Loughnane – trumpet (2, 5, 9–11), flugelhorn (3, 4, 6–8, 10), horn arrangements (3), horn transcriptions (5), lead vocals (7), backing vocals (1, 3, 7)
- James Pankow – trombone (2, 5–11), horn arrangements (5)
- Walter Parazaider – alto saxophone (7, 8, 10)
- Jason Scheff – bass guitar (2–11), synth bass (4), keyboards (4), acoustic guitars (6), acoustic piano (6), lead vocals (1, 4, 6, 9), backing vocals (1–3, 5, 7, 9), arrangements
- Tris Imboden – drums (2–11)
- Keith Howland – lead guitar (1), guitars (2–5, 7–11), Rhodes piano (9), horn arrangements (9), lead vocals (9), backing vocals (1, 5), arrangements
- Lou Pardini – keyboards (3, 9), organ (9), lead vocals (1–3, 8, 11), backing vocals (1, 5, 9)
- Walfredo Reyes, Jr. – percussion (2, 3, 5, 8, 9, 11)

Additional musicians

- Jeff Babko – horn arrangements (9)
- Luis Conte – percussion (1, 6)
- Dorian Crozier – drums (1)
- Daniel Fornero – trumpet (1), flugelhorn (1)
- Trent Gardner – horn arrangements (3–5, 10), trombone (5), synthesizers (5)
- Scheila Gonzalez – baritone saxophone (1), tenor saxophone (1)
- Ray Herrmann – alto saxophone (2), soprano saxophone (2), tenor saxophone (5, 9)
- Harry Kim – trumpet (1), flugelhorn (1), horn arrangements (1)
- Larry Klimas – alto saxophone (3, 4, 11)
- Nick Lane – horn transcriptions (2, 4, 7, 8, 11), trombone (3, 4)
- Hank Linderman – guitars (2), backing vocals (10), arrangements
- Steve Lu – synthesizers (6)
- John McFee – fiddle (10)
- Michael O'Neil – guitars (1)
- Tim Pierce – electric guitars (6)
- Philippe Saisse – keyboards (1)
- George Shelby – tenor saxophone (1)
- John Van Eps – synthesizers (11), programming (11), arrangements
- Arturo Velasco – trombone (1)
- Verdine White – bass guitar (1)
- David Williams – guitars (1)

Production

- Hank Linderman – coordinating producer, engineer, editing, mixing
- Phil Galdston – additional production and arrangements (Track 2)
- Drew Hester – drum track engineer
- Keith Howland – engineer (Tracks 5 and 9)
- Dave Collins – mastering
- Rick Walsh – additional horn transcriptions
- Robert Lamm and Trent Gardner – art direction
- Trent Gardner with Rigel Blue Agency and Lucky Thirteen Designs – package design and graphics

The band's composers are each respectively credited as each track's "supervising producer".

== Charts ==
Chart (2014)	Peak position
UK Independent Albums	24
German Albums (Offizielle Top 100)	56
Swiss Albums (Schweizer Hitparade)	100
US Billboard 200	82
