= Chicago (band) =

American rock band

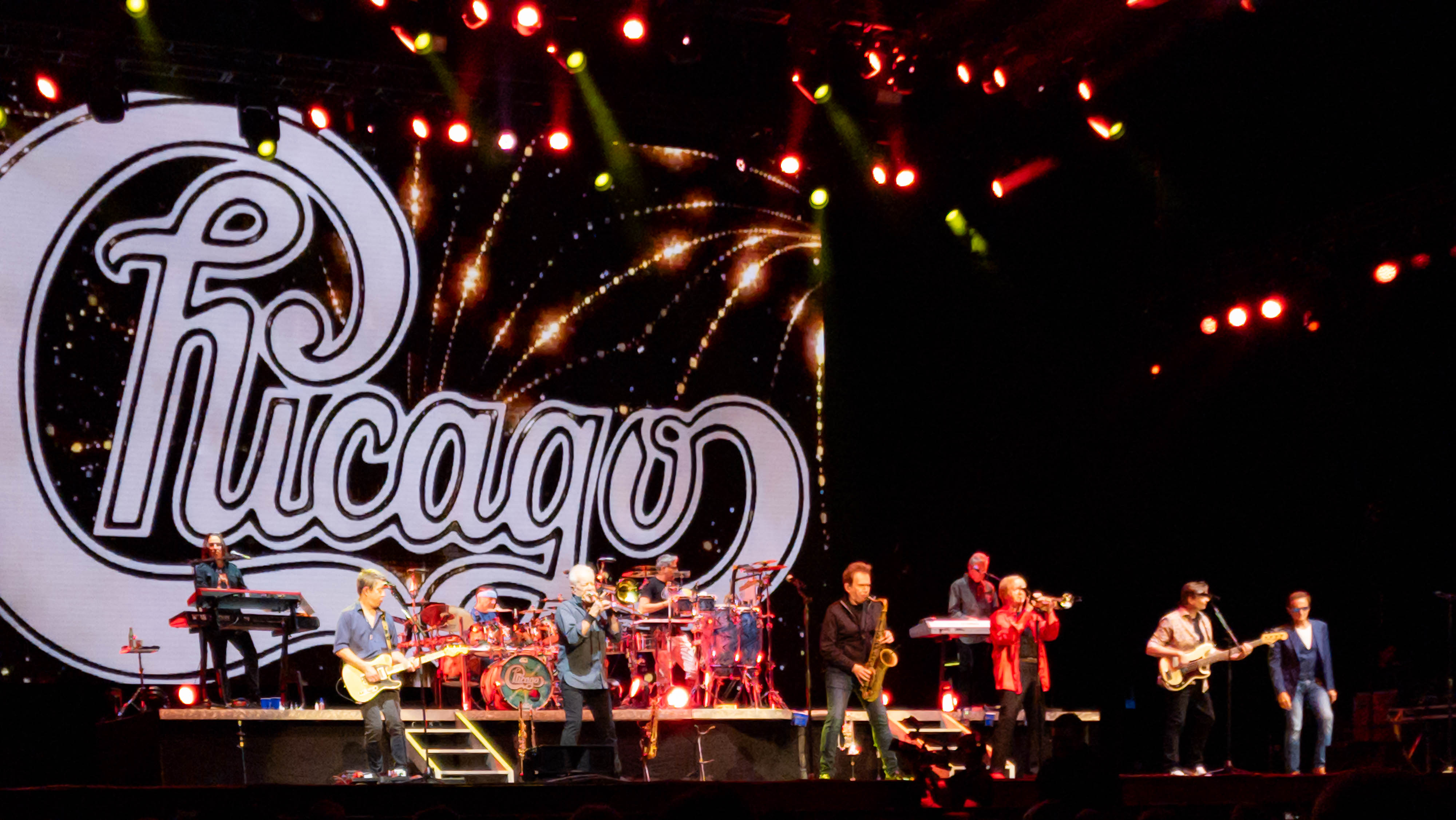
- Chicago performing in 2024

Background information
- Also known as: The Big Thing (1967–1968); The Chicago Transit Authority (1968–1969)
- Origin: Chicago, Illinois, United States
- Genres: Rock; soft rock; pop rock; jazz rock
- Works: Chicago discography
- Years active: 1967–present
- Labels: Columbia; Warner Bros.; Full Moon; Rhino; Reprise; Chicago Records/Chicago Records II; Frontiers; BMG
- Members: Robert Lamm; Lee Loughnane; James Pankow; Walfredo Reyes Jr.; Ray Herrmann; Ramon Yslas; Tony Obrohta; Eric Baines; Carlos Murguia; Justin Avery; Rudy Cardenas; Nick Lane
- Past members: Terry Kath; Danny Seraphine; Walter Parazaider; Peter Cetera; Laudir de Oliveira; Donnie Dacus; Chris Pinnick; Bill Champlin; Jason Scheff; Dawayne Bailey; Tris Imboden; Bruce Gaitsch; Keith Howland; Drew Hester; Lou Pardini; Daniel de los Reyes; Jeff Coffey; Neil Donell; Brett Simons; Loren Gold
- Website: Official website

Chicago is an American rock band formed in Chicago, Illinois, in 1967. Self-described as a "rock and roll band with horns", their songs often also combine elements of classical music, jazz, R&B, and pop music.

Growing out of several bands from the Chicago area in the late 1960s, the original line-up consisted of Peter Cetera on bass, Terry Kath on guitar, Robert Lamm on keyboards, Lee Loughnane on trumpet, James Pankow on trombone, Walter Parazaider on woodwinds, and Danny Seraphine on drums. Cetera, Kath, and Lamm shared lead vocal duties. The group initially called themselves the Big Thing, then changed to the Chicago Transit Authority in 1968, and finally shortened the name to Chicago in 1969.

Laudir de Oliveira joined the band as a percussionist and second drummer in 1974. Kath died in 1978 and was replaced by several guitarists in succession. Bill Champlin joined in 1981, providing vocals, keyboards, and rhythm guitar. Cetera left the band in 1985 and was replaced by Jason Scheff. Seraphine left in 1990 and was replaced by Tris Imboden. Although the band's lineup has been more fluid since 2009, Lamm, Loughnane, and Pankow have remained constant members. Parazaider "officially retired" in 2017. In 2021, he revealed he had been diagnosed with Alzheimer's disease. He died in 2026. In 2025, Lamm and Pankow went on hiatus from touring amidst health problems. In April, 2026, Loughnane confirmed that while Lamm and Pankow are not touring because of health concerns, they have not retired and remain members of the band.

In September 2008, Billboard ranked Chicago at number thirteen in a list of the top 100 artists of all time for Hot 100 singles chart success, and ranked them at number fifteen on that same list in October 2015. Billboard also ranked Chicago ninth on the list of the 100 greatest artists of all time in terms of Billboard 200 album chart success in October 2015. Chicago is one of the longest-running and most successful rock groups, and one of the world's best-selling groups of all time, having sold more than 100 million records. In 1971, Chicago was the first rock act to sell out Carnegie Hall for a week. Chicago is also considered a pioneer in rock music marketing, featuring a recognizable logo on album covers, and sequentially naming their albums using Roman numerals.

In terms of chart success, Chicago is one of the most successful American bands in Recording Industry Association of America (RIAA) and Billboard history (second only to the Beach Boys), and are one of the most successful popular music acts of all time. To date, Chicago has sold over 40 million units in the U.S., with 23 gold, 18 platinum, and eight multi-platinum albums. They had five consecutive number-one albums on the Billboard 200, 20 top-ten singles on the Billboard Hot 100, and in 1974 the group had seven albums, its entire catalog at the time, on the Billboard 200 simultaneously. The group has received ten Grammy Award nominations, winning one for the song "If You Leave Me Now". The group's first album, Chicago Transit Authority, released in 1969, was inducted into the Grammy Hall of Fame in 2014. The original line-up of Chicago was inducted into the Rock and Roll Hall of Fame in 2016. In 2017, Cetera, Lamm, and Pankow were elected to the Songwriters Hall of Fame. Chicago received a Grammy Lifetime Achievement Award on October 16, 2020.

== History ==
=== The Big Thing ===
The group now known as Chicago began on February 15, 1967, at a meeting involving saxophonist Walter Parazaider, guitarist Terry Kath, drummer Danny Seraphine, trombonist James Pankow, trumpet player Lee Loughnane, and keyboardist/singer Robert Lamm. Kath, Parazaider, and Seraphine had played together previously in two other groups—Jimmy Ford and the Executives, and the Missing Links. Parazaider had met Pankow and Loughnane when they were all students at DePaul University. Lamm, a student at Roosevelt University, was recruited from his group, Bobby Charles and the Wanderers. The group of six called themselves the Big Thing, and like most other groups playing in Chicago nightclubs, played Top 40 hits. Realizing the need for both a tenor to complement baritones Lamm and Kath, and a bass player because Lamm's use of organ bass pedals did not provide "adequate bass sound", local tenor and bassist Peter Cetera was invited to join the Big Thing in late 1967.

=== Chicago Transit Authority and early success ===
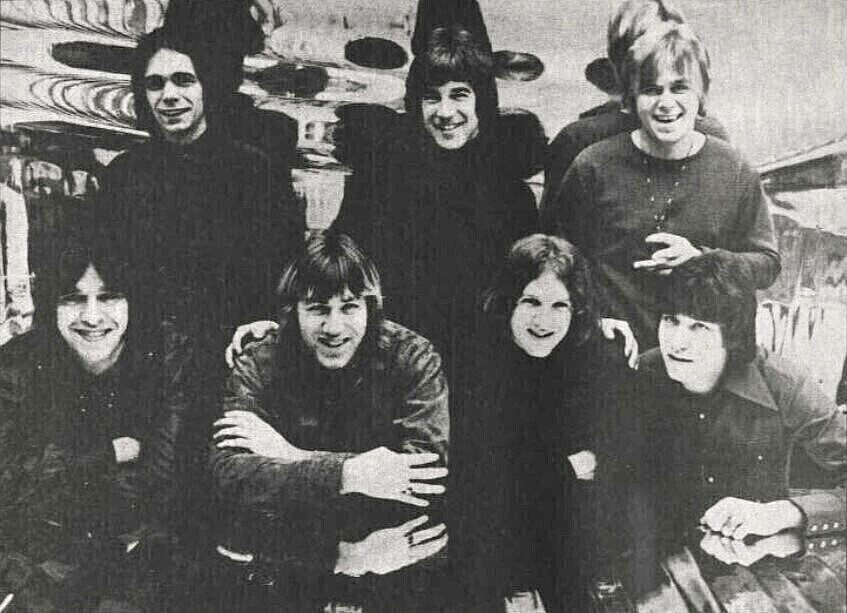
Chicago Transit Authority circa 1969 (left to right: Parazaider, Seraphine, Kath, Pankow, Loughnane, Cetera, Lamm)

While gaining some success as a cover band, the group began working on original songs. In June 1968, at manager James William Guercio's request, the Big Thing moved to Los Angeles, California, where they signed with Columbia Records and changed their name to Chicago Transit Authority. While performing on a regular basis at the Whisky a Go Go nightclub in West Hollywood, the band got exposure to more famous musical artists of the time, subsequently opening for Janis Joplin and Jimi Hendrix. Group biographer William James Ruhlmann recorded Walt Parazaider as saying that Jimi Hendrix once told him: "'Jeez, your horn players are like one set of lungs and your guitar player is better than me.'"

Their first record (April 1969), Chicago Transit Authority, is a double album, a rarity for a band's initial studio release. The album made it to No. 17 on the Billboard 200 album chart, sold over one million copies by 1970, and was awarded a platinum disc. The album included a number of pop-rock songs – "Does Anybody Really Know What Time It Is?", "Beginnings", "Questions 67 and 68", and "I'm a Man" – which were later released as singles. For this inaugural recording effort the group was nominated for a Grammy Award for 1969 Best New Artist of the Year. In 2025, the Library of Congress selected Chicago Transit Authority for inclusion as an album in the National Recording Registry.

According to Cetera, the band was booked to perform at Woodstock in 1969, but promoter Bill Graham, with whom they had a contract, exercised his right to reschedule them to play at the Fillmore West on a date of his choosing, and he scheduled them for the Woodstock dates. Santana, which Graham also managed, took Chicago's place at Woodstock, and that performance is considered to be Santana's "breakthrough" gig. A year later, when he needed to replace headliner Joe Cocker, and then Cocker's intended replacement, Jimi Hendrix, Graham booked Chicago to perform at Tanglewood, which has been called a "pinnacle" performance by Concert Vault.

After the release of their first album, the band's name was shortened to Chicago to avoid legal action being threatened by the actual mass-transit company of the same name.

=== 1970s: Chicago ===
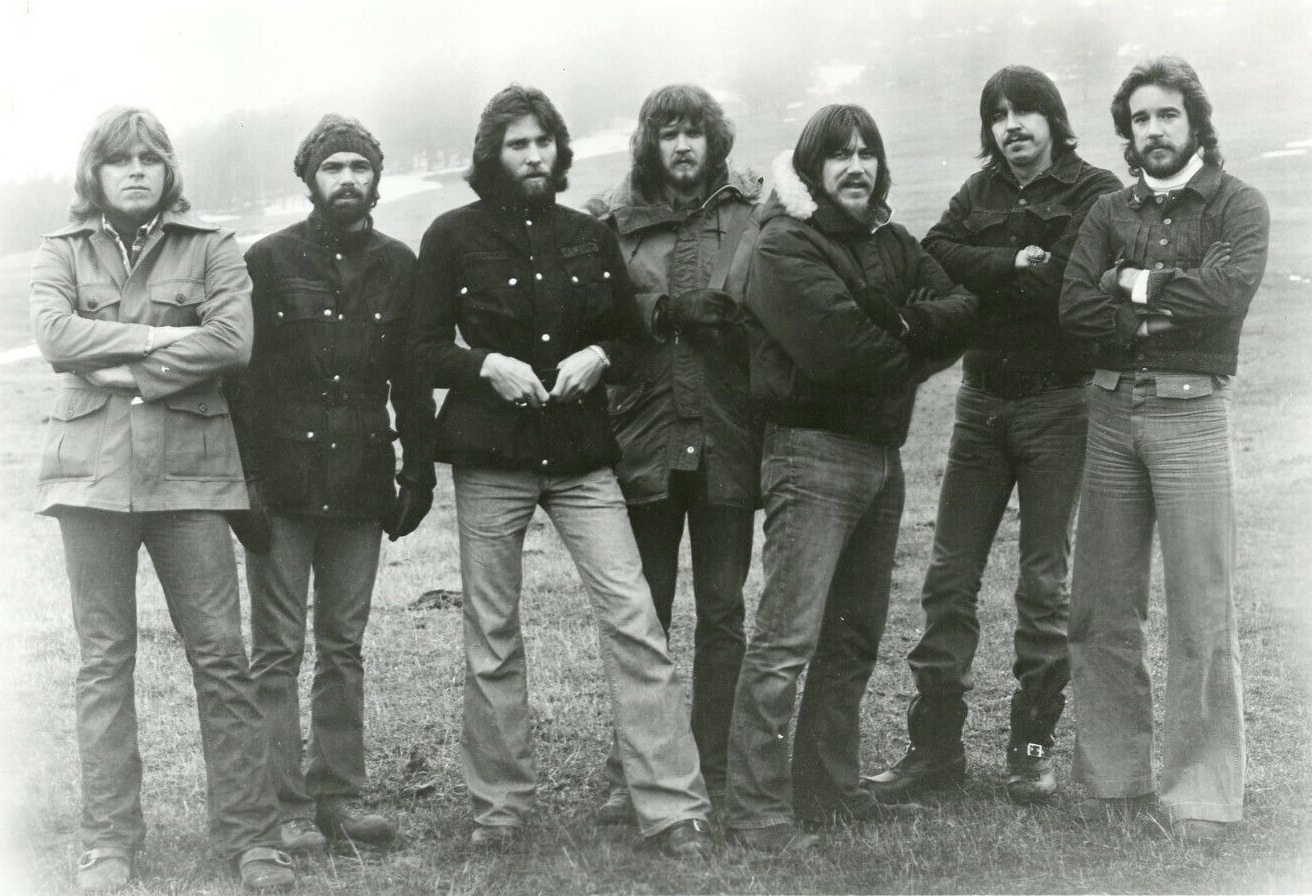
Chicago circa 1973 (left to right: Peter Cetera, Danny Seraphine, Robert Lamm, Lee Loughnane, Terry Kath, Walter Parazaider, James Pankow)

In 1970, less than a year after its first album, the band released a second album, titled Chicago (retroactively known as Chicago II), which is another double-LP. The album's centerpiece track is a seven-part, 13-minute suite composed by Pankow called "Ballet for a Girl in Buchannon". The suite yielded two top ten hits: "Make Me Smile" (No. 9 U.S.) and "Colour My World", both sung by Kath. Among the other tracks on the album: Lamm's dynamic but cryptic "25 or 6 to 4" (Chicago's first Top 5 hit), which is a reference to a songwriter trying to write at 25 or 26 minutes before 4 o'clock in the morning, and was sung by Cetera with Kath on guitar; the lengthy war-protest song "It Better End Soon"; and, at the end, Cetera's 1969 Moon landing-inspired "Where Do We Go from Here?" The double-LP album's inner cover includes the playlist, the entire lyrics to "It Better End Soon", and two declarations: "This endeavor should be experienced sequentially", and, "With this album, we dedicate ourselves, our futures and our energies to the people of the revolution. And the revolution in all of its forms." The album was a commercial success, rising to number four on the Billboard 200, and was certified gold by the Recording Industry Association of America (RIAA) in 1970, and platinum in 1991. The band was nominated for two Grammy Awards as a result of this album, Album of the Year and Best Contemporary Vocal Performance by a Duo, Group or Chorus.

Chicago III, another double LP, was released in 1971 and charted at No. 2 on the Billboard 200. Two singles were released from it: "Free" from Lamm's "Travel Suite", which charted at No. 20 on the Billboard Hot 100; and "Lowdown", written by Cetera and Seraphine, which made it to No. 35. The album was certified gold by the RIAA in February 1971, and platinum in November 1986.

The band released LPs at a rate of at least one album per year from their third album in 1971 on through the 1970s. During this period, the group's album titles primarily consisted of the band's name followed by a Roman numeral, indicating the album's sequence in their canon. The exceptions to this scheme were the band's fourth album, a live boxed set entitled Chicago at Carnegie Hall, their twelfth album Hot Streets, and the Arabic-numbered Chicago 13. While the live album itself did not bear a number, the four discs within the set were numbered Volumes I through IV.

In 1971, the band released Chicago at Carnegie Hall Volumes I, II, III, and IV, a quadruple LP, consisting of live performances, mostly of music from their first three albums, from a week-long run at Carnegie Hall. Chicago was the first rock act to sell out a week at Carnegie Hall and the live recording was made to chronicle that milestone. Along with the four vinyl discs, the packaging contained some strident political messaging about how "We [youth] can change the System", including wall posters and voter registration information. The album went gold "out of the box" and on to multi-platinum status. William James Ruhlmann says Chicago at Carnegie Hall was "perhaps" the best-selling box set by a rock act and held that record for 15 years. In recognition of setting Carnegie Hall records and the ensuing four-LP live recordings, the group was awarded a Billboard 1972 Trendsetter Award. Drummer Danny Seraphine attributes the fact that none of Chicago's first four albums were issued on single LPs to the productive creativity of this period and the length of the jazz-rock pieces.

In 1972, the band released its first single-disc release, Chicago V, which reached No. 1 on both the Billboard pop and jazz album charts. It features "Saturday in the Park", written by Robert Lamm, which mixes everyday life and political yearning in a more subtle way. It peaked at No. 3 on the Billboard Hot 100 in early 1972. The second single released from the album was the Lamm-composed "Dialogue (Part I & II)", which featured a musical "debate" between a political activist (sung by Kath) and a blasé college student (sung by Cetera). It peaked at No. 24 on the Hot 100 chart.

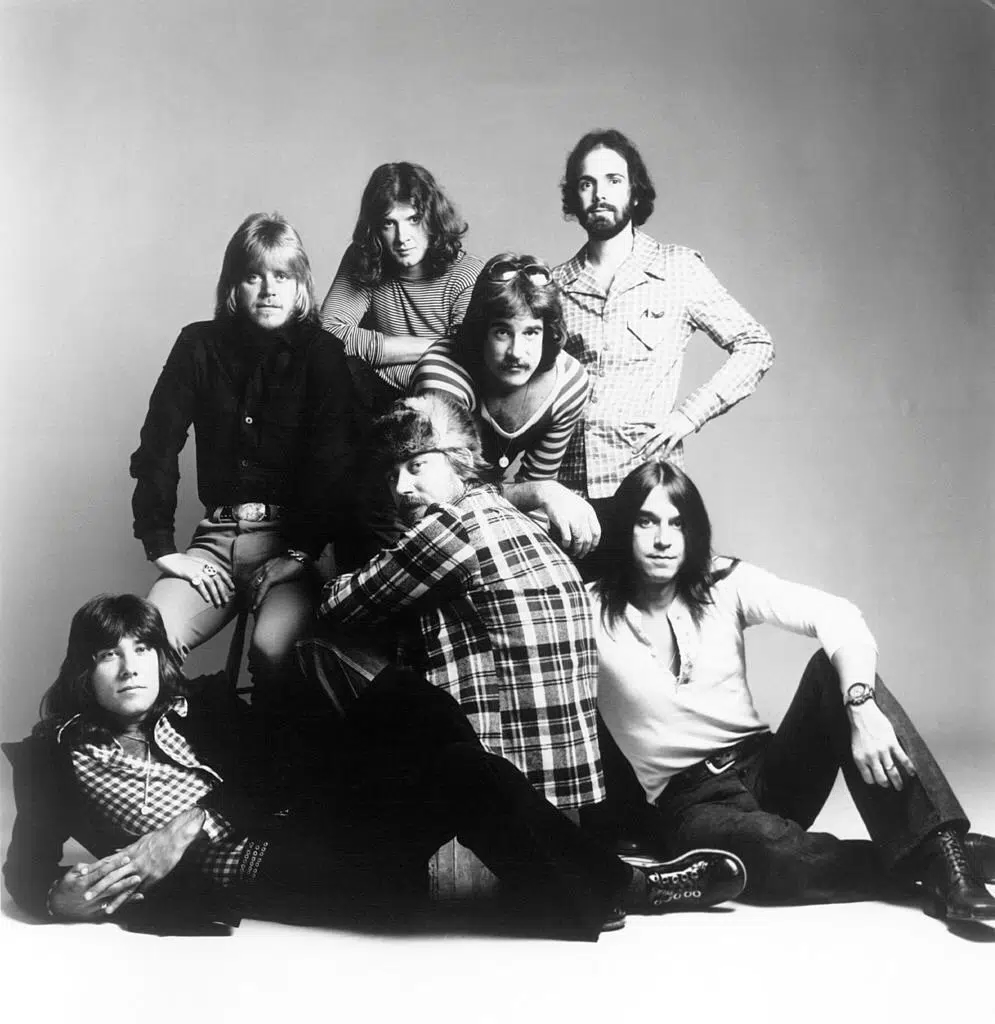
Chicago circa 1975 (left to right, front: Lamm, Kath, Parazaider; back: Cetera, Loughnane, Pankow, Seraphine)

Other albums and singles followed in each of the succeeding years. 1973's Chicago VI was the first of several albums to include Brazilian jazz percussionist Laudir de Oliveira and saw Cetera emerge as the main lead singer. According to William James Ruhlmann, de Oliveira was a "sideman" on Chicago VI and became an official member of the group in 1974. Chicago VI featured two top ten singles, "Just You 'n' Me", written by Pankow, and "Feelin' Stronger Every Day", written by Pankow and Cetera. Chicago VII was the band's double-disc 1974 release. Three singles were released from this album: "(I've Been) Searchin' So Long", written by Pankow, and "Call On Me", written by Loughnane, both of which made it into the top ten; and the Beach Boys-infused "Wishing You Were Here", written by Cetera, which peaked at number eleven.

Writing for Billboard magazine, Joel Whitburn reported in October 1974 that the group had seven albums, its entire catalog at the time, on the Billboard 200 simultaneously, placing them seventh in a list of artists in that category. Their 1975 release, Chicago VIII, featured the political allegory "Harry Truman" (No. 13, Top 100 chart) and the nostalgic Pankow-composed "Old Days" (No. 5, Top 100 chart). That summer also saw a joint tour across America with the Beach Boys, with the two acts performing separately, then coming together for a finale. Chicago VI, VII, and VIII all made it to No. 1 on the Billboard 200, all were certified gold the years they were released, and all have since been certified platinum. Chicago VI was certified two times multi-platinum in 1986. Chicago IX: Chicago's Greatest Hits was released in 1975 and became the band's fifth consecutive No. 1 album on the Billboard 200.

1976's Chicago X features Cetera's ballad "If You Leave Me Now", which held the top spot in the U.S. charts for two weeks and the UK charts for three weeks. It was the group's first No. 1 single, and won Chicago their only Grammy Award to date, the 1976 Best Pop Vocal Performance by a Duo, Group or Chorus, at the 19th Annual Grammy Awards held on February 19, 1977. The single was certified gold by the RIAA the same year of its release. The song almost did not make the cut for the album. "If You Leave Me Now" was recorded at the last minute. The success of the song, according to William James Ruhlmann, foreshadowed a later reliance on ballads. The album reached No. 3 on the Billboard 200, was certified both gold and platinum by the RIAA the same year of its release and two times multi-platinum since, and was also nominated for the Grammy Award for Album of the Year. 1976 was the first year that albums were certified platinum by the RIAA. In honor of the group's platinum album achievement, Columbia Records that year awarded the group a 25-pound bar of pure platinum, made by Cartier. (Billboard magazine reported it as a 30-pound bar.) (Note: Although Rolling Stone reporter Charles M. Young wrote that Chicago was awarded the platinum bar because it was the first band to receive platinum album certification for Columbia Records, this was not the case. Chicago X was certified platinum on September 4, 1976, but Aerosmith's album, Rocks, also on Columbia Records, was certified platinum on July 9, 1976, before it. Billboard reported that the platinum bar was awarded in recognition of the group's ten platinum albums. Billboard's account seems more likely in consideration of the two-full-pages advertisement Columbia placed in the June 12, 1976, issue of Record World announcing, "'Chicago X.' Their tenth platinum album, on Columbia records and tapes." The albums released prior to 1976, however, were not actually certified platinum by the RIAA until 1986.) At the 4th Annual American Music Awards, a fan-voted awards show, held January 31, 1977, Chicago won the award for Favorite Pop/Rock Band/Duo/Group, the group's first of two American Music Awards they have received.

The group's 1977 release, Chicago XI, includes Cetera's ballad "Baby, What a Big Surprise", a No. 4 U.S. hit which became the group's last top 10 hit of the decade. Chicago XI performed well commercially, peaking at No. 6 on the Billboard 200, and reaching platinum status during the year of its release. On October 17, 1977, during the intermission of an Emerson, Lake & Palmer concert, Madison Square Garden announced its new Gold Ticket Award, to be given to performers who had brought the venue over 100,000 in unit ticket sales. Because the arena has a seating capacity of about 20,000, this would require a minimum of five sold-out shows there. Chicago was one of at least eleven other acts that were eligible for the award, and weeks later, at its October 28, 1977, Madison Square Garden concert, Chicago was one of the first acts to receive the award for drawing over 180,000 people to the venue in nine sold-out appearances there over the years. Cashbox reviewer Ken Terry said of the 1977 Madison Square Garden concert, "Chicago ultimately presents itself in the best light with AM-oriented, good-time music. Its fans are not looking for complicated, introverted songs; they want music to drive to, dance to and work to."

Besides recording and touring, during the busy 1970s, Chicago also made time for a movie appearance and several television appearances of note. In 1972, Guercio produced and directed Electra Glide in Blue, a film about an Arizona motorcycle policeman. Released in 1973, the film stars Robert Blake and features Cetera, Kath, Loughnane, and Parazaider in supporting roles. The group also appears prominently on the film's soundtrack. Chicago made its "television variety debut" in February 1973 when they were the only rock musicians invited to appear on a television special honoring Duke Ellington, Duke Ellington... We Love You Madly, which aired on CBS. They performed the Ellington composition, "Jump for Joy".

In July 1973, the group starred in a half-hour television special produced by Dick Clark, Chicago in the Rockies, which aired in prime time on ABC. The show was filmed on location at Caribou Ranch, the 3,000-acre ranch-turned-recording studio located outside of Boulder, Colorado, owned by Chicago's producer, James William Guercio. The only musical guest on the show was Al Green, who was rated the number-one male vocalist of 1972, and whom Rolling Stone magazine named "Rock and Roll Star of the Year". That special was followed by a second hour-long special the next year, Chicago ... Meanwhile, Back at the Ranch, which aired in prime time on ABC in August 1974. Chicago ... Meanwhile, Back at the Ranch was again shot on location at Caribou Ranch and was again produced by Dick Clark. Singer Anne Murray and country music star Charlie Rich were guests on the show. Clark produced a third television special starring Chicago, Chicago's New Year's Rockin' Eve 1975, which aired on ABC on December 31, 1974. Musical guests on the 1 1/2-hour-long show included the Beach Boys, the Doobie Brothers, Olivia Newton-John, and Herbie Hancock. It was the third Rockin' Eve Clark had produced, and it competed with Guy Lombardo's traditional New Year's Eve television show which aired on a different network and was in its 45th consecutive year of broadcast. Clark hoped the Rockin' Eve format would become an "annual TV custom".

==== Death of Terry Kath and transition ====
The year 1978 began with a split with Guercio. Chicago had recorded its last five studio albums Chicago VI, VII, VIII, X, and XI, and had made two television specials at Guercio's Caribou Ranch. In later years, band members cited Guercio's purchase of Caribou Ranch, more particularly their realization that Guercio had enough money to purchase Caribou Ranch, as a contributing factor to their disillusionment with him as a producer. They felt he had taken advantage of them financially. Then on January 23 of that same year, Kath died of an accidental, self-inflicted gunshot wound from a gun he thought was unloaded. Doc Severinsen, who was the bandleader for The Tonight Show Starring Johnny Carson at the time and a friend of the group, visited them after Kath's funeral and encouraged them to continue. According to writer Jim Jerome, the visit "snapped them back" and helped them make the decision to carry on.

After auditioning over 30 potential replacements for Kath, Chicago decided upon guitarist and singer-songwriter Donnie Dacus. While filming for the musical Hair, he joined the band in April 1978 just in time to record the Hot Streets album. Its energetic lead-off single, "Alive Again", brought Chicago back to the Top 15; Pankow wrote it "originally as a love song but ultimately as recognition of Kath's guiding spirit shining down from above".

The 1978 album Hot Streets was produced by Phil Ramone. It was Chicago's first album with a title rather than a number, and was the band's first LP to have a picture of the band (shot by photographer Norman Seeff) featured prominently on the cover (with the ubiquitous logo downsized). These two moves were seen by many as indications that the band had changed following Kath's death. To a degree, the band returned to the old naming scheme on its subsequent releases, although most titles now bore Arabic numerals rather than Roman numerals. Hot Streets, the band's 12th album, peaked at No. 12 on the Billboard charts; it was Chicago's first release since their debut to fail to make the Top 10. According to Jeff Giles, "Although Chicago quickly soldiered on [after Kath's death], releasing their Hot Streets album with new guitarist Donnie Dacus that October, it was impossible not to notice the loss of momentum." The release also marked a move somewhat away from the jazz-rock direction favored by Kath and towards more pop songs and ballads. Dacus stayed with the band through the 1979 album Chicago 13, and is also featured in a promotional video on the DVD included in the Rhino Records Chicago box set from 2003. Again produced by Ramone, it was the group's first studio album not to contain a Top 40 hit. Dacus departed from the band following the conclusion of the concert tour in support of Chicago 13, in 1980.

=== 1980s: changing sound ===
Chicago XIV (1980), produced by Tom Dowd, relegated the horn section to the background on a number of tracks, and the album's two singles failed to make the Top 40. Chris Pinnick joined the band to play guitar and remained through 1985, and the band were also augmented by saxophone player Marty Grebb on the subsequent tour. Marty Grebb had formerly been with the Buckinghams, and before that had been Cetera's bandmate in a local Chicago area cover band called the Exceptions. The album peaked at No. 71 on the Billboard 200, and failed to reach gold certification by the RIAA. Believing the band to no longer be commercially viable, Columbia Records dropped them from its roster in 1981 and released a second greatest hits volume (counted as Chicago XV in the album chronology) later that year to fulfill its contractual obligation.

In late 1981, the band had new management, a new producer (David Foster), a new label (Warner Bros. Records), and the addition of keyboardist, guitarist, and singer Bill Champlin (Sons of Champlin). Percussionist Laudir de Oliveira and Marty Grebb departed from the band. During Foster's stewardship, less of an emphasis was placed on the band's horn-based sound, being replaced by lush power ballads, which became Chicago's style during the 1980s. The new sound brought more singles success to the band.

For the 1982 album Chicago 16, the band worked with composers from outside the group for the first time, and Foster brought in studio musicians for some tracks (including the core members of Toto), and used new technology (such as synthesizers) to "update" and streamline the sound, further pushing back the horn section, and in some cases not even using them at all. The band did return to the charts with the Cetera-sung ballad "Hard to Say I'm Sorry/Get Away", which is featured in the soundtrack of the Daryl Hannah film Summer Lovers. Co-written by Cetera and David Foster, "Hard to Say I'm Sorry" was the group's second single to reach No. 1 on the Hot 100 chart and gave them a nomination for the Grammy Award for Best Pop Performance by a Duo or Group with Vocal. Chicago 16 reached both gold and platinum status during the year of its release, and went to No. 9 on the Billboard 200 album chart.

1984's Chicago 17 became the biggest selling album in the band's history, certified by the RIAA in 1997 as six times multi-platinum. The album produced two more Top Ten (both No. 3) singles, "You're the Inspiration", written by Cetera and David Foster, and "Hard Habit to Break", written by Steve Kipner and John Lewis Parker. The single, "Hard Habit to Break", brought two more Grammy Award nominations for the band, for Record of the Year and Best Pop Performance by a Duo or Group with Vocals. The album included two other singles: "Stay the Night" (No. 16), another composition by Cetera and Foster; and "Along Comes a Woman" (No. 14), written by Cetera and Mark Goldenberg. Peter's brother, Kenny Cetera, who had provided background vocals on the Chicago 17 album, was brought into the group for the 17 tour to add percussion and high harmony vocals.

By 1985, the band was embracing the newest medium, the music video channel MTV, by releasing music videos for four songs. They featured a track titled "Good for Nothing" on the 1985 global activist album, We Are the World. As contributors to the album, along with all other artists who were on the album, the band received its last nomination for a Grammy Award, for Album of the Year.

At the 13th Annual American Music Awards, held January 27, 1986, Chicago won the award for Favorite Pop/Rock Band/Duo/Group for the second time. It is the last American Music Award the band has received.

==== Peter Cetera departure and continued success ====
Concurrently with Chicago's existing career, vocalist Peter Cetera had begun a solo career. He proposed an arrangement with the band where they would take hiatuses after tours to let him focus on solo work (mirroring that of Phil Collins and Genesis), but the band declined. Cetera ultimately left Chicago in the summer of 1985. He soon topped the charts with "Glory of Love" (the theme song of the film The Karate Kid Part II), and with "The Next Time I Fall" (a duet with Amy Grant). Two more songs reached the top ten: a 1988 solo hit called "One Good Woman" (No. 4 U.S.), and a 1989 duet with Cher called "After All" (No. 6 U.S.).

Cetera's former position was filled by bassist and singer-songwriter Jason Scheff, son of Elvis Presley's bassist Jerry Scheff. Guitarist Chris Pinnick also left the group in 1985, prior to the recording of the band's next album. For the final Foster-produced album, Chicago 18, the band filled Pinnick's spot with several session guitarists, none of whom became band members. The album was released on September 29, 1986, and included the No. 3 single "Will You Still Love Me?", and top 20 single "If She Would Have Been Faithful...", in addition to an updated version of "25 or 6 to 4" with a video that got airplay on MTV. The video won an award for Best Cinematography for Bobby Byrne at the American Video Awards. Soon after the album was recorded, the band hired guitarist Dawayne Bailey, formerly of Bob Seger's Silver Bullet Band. Bailey and Scheff had previously played in bands together, so Scheff introduced Bailey to the band in time for the Chicago 18 tour.

For the 1988 release Chicago 19, the band had replaced producer Foster with co-producers Ron Nevison, who had recently produced two albums for Heart, and Chas Sanford, who had worked with Rod Stewart and Stevie Nicks. They topped the charts again with the Diane Warren-composed single "Look Away". It was the third and last Chicago single to reach No. 1 on the Hot 100 chart. The song ultimately was named as the "Billboard Hot 100 No. 1 Song of the Year" for 1989. The album also yielded two more top 10 hits, "I Don't Wanna Live Without Your Love" and "You're Not Alone", both with Champlin singing lead vocals, and the Scheff-sung No. 55 single, "We Can Last Forever", in addition to including the original version of a top 5 single titled "What Kind of Man Would I Be?". The latter, also sung by Scheff, was remixed for inclusion on the band's forthcoming greatest hits record (and 20th album), Greatest Hits 1982–1989, and it was this version that became a hit.

=== 1990s: more changes and Stone of Sisyphus ===
The beginning of the 1990s brought yet another departure. Original drummer Danny Seraphine was dismissed from the band in May 1990. Seraphine was succeeded by Tris Imboden, a longtime drummer with Kenny Loggins and former session drummer with Peter Cetera. Imboden made his first appearance on the 1991 album Twenty 1 with a fragment of band's logo, which yielded an eleven-week stretch on the Billboard 200, a peak at No. 66, and the song "Chasin' the Wind" which peaked at No. 39. Twenty 1 would be their last released album of original music for fifteen years.

The band was recognized with a star on the Hollywood Walk of Fame on July 23, 1992.

In 1993, Chicago wrote and recorded their 22nd album Stone of Sisyphus. This album was to have marked their return to their traditional composition of the 1970s, emphasizing major horn accompaniment. However, following a reorganization of the record company, the new executives at Reprise Records (now part of the newly formed Warner Music Group) rejected the completed album. It remained unpublished for fifteen years, aside from bootleg tapes and Internet files. This contributed to the parting of the band from the record label. The band was dismayed by the failure of the label. Upset with the shelving of the album, Dawayne Bailey voiced his objections and his annual contract was not renewed by the band in late 1994. And in the years that followed there were many debates and conjecture about the events surrounding the recordings. It was also suggested some years later that the band's management was negotiating with the label regarding a licensing of the extensive Chicago back catalog, and when those talks stalled, the label apparently retaliated by scrapping the project. The album eventually saw an expanded release on Rhino Records in June 2008, and made it to No. 122 on the album charts.

After finishing their 1994 tour, and after signing with the Warner Bros. Records imprint label Giant Records, they released their 1995 album Night & Day: Big Band, consisting of covers of songs originally recorded by Sarah Vaughan, Glenn Miller, and Duke Ellington. Guitarist Bruce Gaitsch stepped in and joined the band to handle the album's guitar work. The album featured guest appearances by Paul Shaffer of Late Show with David Letterman fame, Aerosmith guitarist Joe Perry, and the Gipsy Kings. Parazaider cited the group's participation in the 1973 television special honoring Duke Ellington, Duke Ellington... We Love You Madly, as key in their decision to record this album. After this big band album, Chicago acquired the rights to their Columbia recordings and reissued them on their own imprint. In early 1995, Keith Howland, who had been a studio musician and stage hand based in Los Angeles, was recruited as Chicago's new permanent guitarist.

In 1998, Chicago released Chicago XXV: The Christmas Album and a live album in 1999, Chicago XXVI on their own imprint.

=== 2000s ===
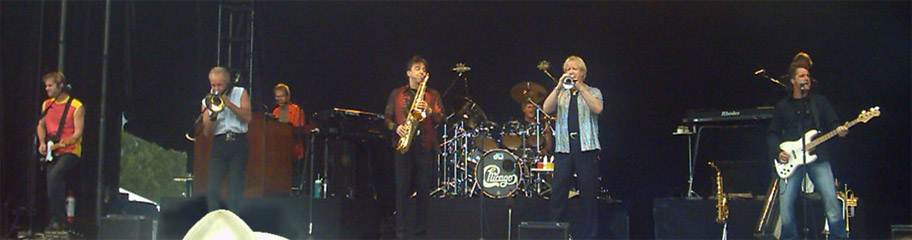
Chicago in 2004 (l–r): Howland, Pankow, Champlin, Parazaider, Imboden, Loughnane, Scheff, and Lamm (behind Scheff)

In 2002, the band licensed their entire recorded output to Rhino Records, after having recorded it at Columbia Records and Warner Bros. Records. In 2002, Rhino released a two-disc compilation, The Very Best of: Only the Beginning, which spanned the band's career. The compilation made the Top 40 and sold over 2 million copies in the U.S. Rhino also began releasing remastered versions of all of the band's Columbia-era albums. The following year, the band released their most comprehensive compilation to date in the form of a box set, simply titled The Box. In October 2003, Rhino reissued Chicago XXV: The Christmas Album, along with six new recordings, as What's It Gonna Be, Santa?.

The American cable music channel VH1 featured the band in an episode of its Behind the Music series, "Chicago: Behind the Music", season 1, episode 133. The episode first aired on October 15, 2000.

In 2004, 2005, and 2009, Chicago toured with Earth, Wind & Fire.

On March 21, 2006, their first all-new studio album since Twenty 1 arrived with Chicago XXX. It was produced by Jay DeMarcus, bassist/vocalist with the country trio Rascal Flatts, who was a long-time fan of Chicago and had cited the group as an influence on him as a musician in a previous fan letter to Jason Scheff. It also marked the first time the band's music was available as a digital download. The album peaked at No. 41 in the U.S., spawning two minor adult contemporary hits: "Feel" and "Love Will Come Back". Two songs from this album, "Feel" and "Caroline", were performed live during Chicago's fall 2005 tour.

Chicago made multi-week appearances at the MGM Grand Las Vegas in March, May and October 2006. In July 2006, the band made a series of U.S. appearances with Huey Lewis and the News.

On October 2, 2007, Rhino Records released the two-disc The Best of Chicago: 40th Anniversary Edition (Chicago XXXI), a new greatest hits compilation spanning their entire forty years, similar to The Very Best of: Only the Beginning, released five years earlier.

In 2008, Stone of Sisyphus – once known as the aborted Chicago XXII, now listed officially as Chicago XXXII – was released with an expanded format.

Drew Hester, who was the percussionist and drummer for the Foo Fighters, joined the band in January 2009 to temporarily fill in for an ill Imboden, and continued with the band as a percussionist upon Imboden's return later in the year. In August 2009, Champlin was fired from the band. He was replaced by Grammy-nominated keyboardist Lou Pardini, who had worked with Stevie Wonder and Santana.

=== 2010s ===
In 2010 (just as they had already done in 1999 and 2008), Chicago toured with the Doobie Brothers (and would do so again in 2017). A 2011 performance in Chicago became a video for the HDNet cable channel that featured the Doobie Brothers joining Chicago for three encore tunes. The band also appeared on the season nine finale of American Idol. On July 24, 2011, the band performed at Red Rocks in Colorado, accompanied by the Colorado Symphony Orchestra.

With Chicago XXXIII: O Christmas Three, the band re-teamed with producer Ramone (he had previously released the new tracks for the expanded Christmas re-release What's It Gonna Be, Santa?) to record a new Christmas album. Dolly Parton was a guest artist on the album, which was released in October 2011. In the meantime, Rhino released Chicago XXXIV: Live in '75, a two-disc set containing two hours of previously unreleased performances recorded June 24–26, 1975 at the Capital Centre in Largo, Maryland, featuring the original members of Chicago performing some of their greatest hits up to that point. In 2012, Chicago and the Doobie Brothers held another joint tour. That same year, Hester left the group shortly before the tour, and was succeeded at first by percussionist Daniel de los Reyes, then by Daniel's brother and former long-term Santana member, Walfredo Reyes Jr.

In 2013, Lamm, Loughnane, Pankow, and Parazaider appeared in the HBO film Clear History as the band Chicago. In late 2013, the band began releasing singles for a new album, starting with "Somethin' Comin', I Know" in August, "America" in September, "Crazy Happy" in December 2013, and "Naked in the Garden of Allah" in January 2014. The album, titled Chicago XXXVI: Now, was released on July 4, 2014.

The group's debut album, Chicago Transit Authority, released in 1969, was inducted into the Grammy Hall of Fame in 2014. Chicago performed at the 2014 Grammy Awards show with Grammy nominee Robin Thicke. It was the band's first ever appearance on a Grammy Award show. Thicke and Chicago performed a medley of three of Chicago's past hits, then segued into a rendition of Thicke's hit song, "Blurred Lines", which was nominated for "Record of the Year".

On January 25 and 28, 2014 Chicago performed two concerts with the Chicago Symphony Orchestra. In February 2015, Chicago released a two-disc live album, Chicago at Symphony Hall, of their performances with the Chicago Symphony Orchestra.

In 2015, Chicago was listed among the nominees for induction into the Rock and Roll Hall of Fame. The original lineup – Cetera, Kath, Lamm, Loughnane, Pankow, Parazaider, and Seraphine – was inducted at the 31st annual Rock and Roll Hall of Fame induction ceremony on April 8, 2016, along with N.W.A., Deep Purple, Steve Miller, and Cheap Trick. In February 2016, it was announced that original drummer Danny Seraphine would join the current lineup of Chicago for the first time in over 25 years for the Hall of Fame Induction Ceremony. Peter Cetera chose not to attend. Terry Kath's daughter Michelle accepted her father's award. Chicago and Earth, Wind & Fire embarked on another tour together in 2015 and 2016. In July 2016, Chicago performed on ABC's Greatest Hits.

On September 23, 2016, a documentary called The Terry Kath Experience was released. The documentary featured most of the members of Chicago talking about Kath's life (most notably Kath's second wife Camelia Kath and original Chicago bassist Peter Cetera). It was directed by Kath's daughter, Michelle Kath Sinclair.

After taking a temporary leave in May 2016, citing "family health reasons", it was announced on October 25, 2016, that Jason Scheff had left Chicago after 31 years. Bassist/vocalist Jeff Coffey, who had been filling in for Scheff during his absence, was promoted to a full-time member. Saxophonist Ray Herrmann, who had previously filled in for Parazaider on various tour dates since 2005, also became an official member at this time after Parazaider retired permanently from the road. Although Parazaider retired from regular touring, he remained a band member.

In January 2017, CNN Films aired a two-hour biographical documentary film on the group titled Now More Than Ever: The History of Chicago. The film was directed and edited by Peter Pardini, nephew of band member Lou Pardini, and produced by the band. The film's premiere was the highest-rated program in the 25–54 demographic. The film won the 2016 "Best of the Fest" Audience Choice Award at the Sedona International Film Festival. At the 10th Annual Fort Myers Beach Film Festival in 2016, it won the "People's Choice" award and Peter Pardini won the "Rising Star Award" as director and filmmaker.

On February 22, 2017, it was announced that Cetera, Lamm, and Pankow were among the 2017 Songwriters Hall of Fame inductees for their songwriting efforts as members of Chicago. The induction event was held Thursday, June 15 at the Marriott Marquis Hotel in New York City. Chicago's website stated that in 2017, the band was working on a new album, Chicago XXXVII.

On September 17, 2017, former percussionist Laudir de Oliveira died of a heart attack while performing onstage in his native Rio de Janeiro.

Chicago began their 2018 touring schedule on Saturday, January 13 by performing the grand opening concert at the new Xcite Center at Parx Casino in Bensalem, Pennsylvania.

On Wednesday, January 17, 2018, drummer Tris Imboden announced he was leaving the band after 27 years to spend more time with his family. On Friday, January 19, 2018, bassist and vocalist Jeff Coffey announced on his Facebook page that he was also departing from the band due to its heavy touring schedule. Chicago announced that percussionist Walfredo Reyes Jr. was moving over to drums, replacing Imboden. Vocalist Neil Donell, of Chicago tribute band Brass Transit, was chosen as the band's new lead singer and session musician Brett Simons also joined the band as their new bassist. Daniel de los Reyes' return to the percussion position was announced, filling the vacancy left by his brother's move to the drumset.

On April 6, 2018, Chicago released Chicago: VI Decades Live (This is What We Do), a box set chronicling the band's live performances throughout their history.

In May 2018, percussionist Daniel de los Reyes departed Chicago to return to his other group, the Zac Brown Band. On Thursday, May 17, 2018, Chicago announced on their official Facebook page and on their Twitter account that "Ray" Ramon Yslas had joined the band on percussion.

On June 29, 2018, Chicago released the album Chicago II: Live on Soundstage, a live performance from November 2017 of the then current band lineup performing the entire second album.

In July 2018 the band updated its official web site, and no longer listed Parazaider as a member of the band. Instead he is included on the band's "Tribute to Founding Members". Parazaider had retired from touring previously.

On October 26, 2018, Chicago released the album Chicago: Greatest Hits Live, a live performance from 2017 for the PBS series Soundstage.

On August 16, 2019, the band announced on their website that they would be releasing their fourth Christmas album, titled Chicago XXXVII: Chicago Christmas, on October 4, 2019. The album has a greater emphasis on original Christmas songs written by the group than their previous holiday albums.

=== 2020s ===
In March 2020 the band finished their scheduled shows at The Venetian Las Vegas and were scheduled to travel to California the next day for their next performances, but all performances were cancelled due to the COVID-19 pandemic. The band resumed their live performances fifteen months later in Lincoln, Nebraska. In the 2022 documentary, The Last Band on Stage, band members talk about how their plans were affected by COVID and how they coped during that time. The documentary was directed by Peter Curtis Pardini and narrated by actor Joe Mantegna. Mr. Pardini also directed the 2017 documentary, Now More Than Ever: The History of Chicago.

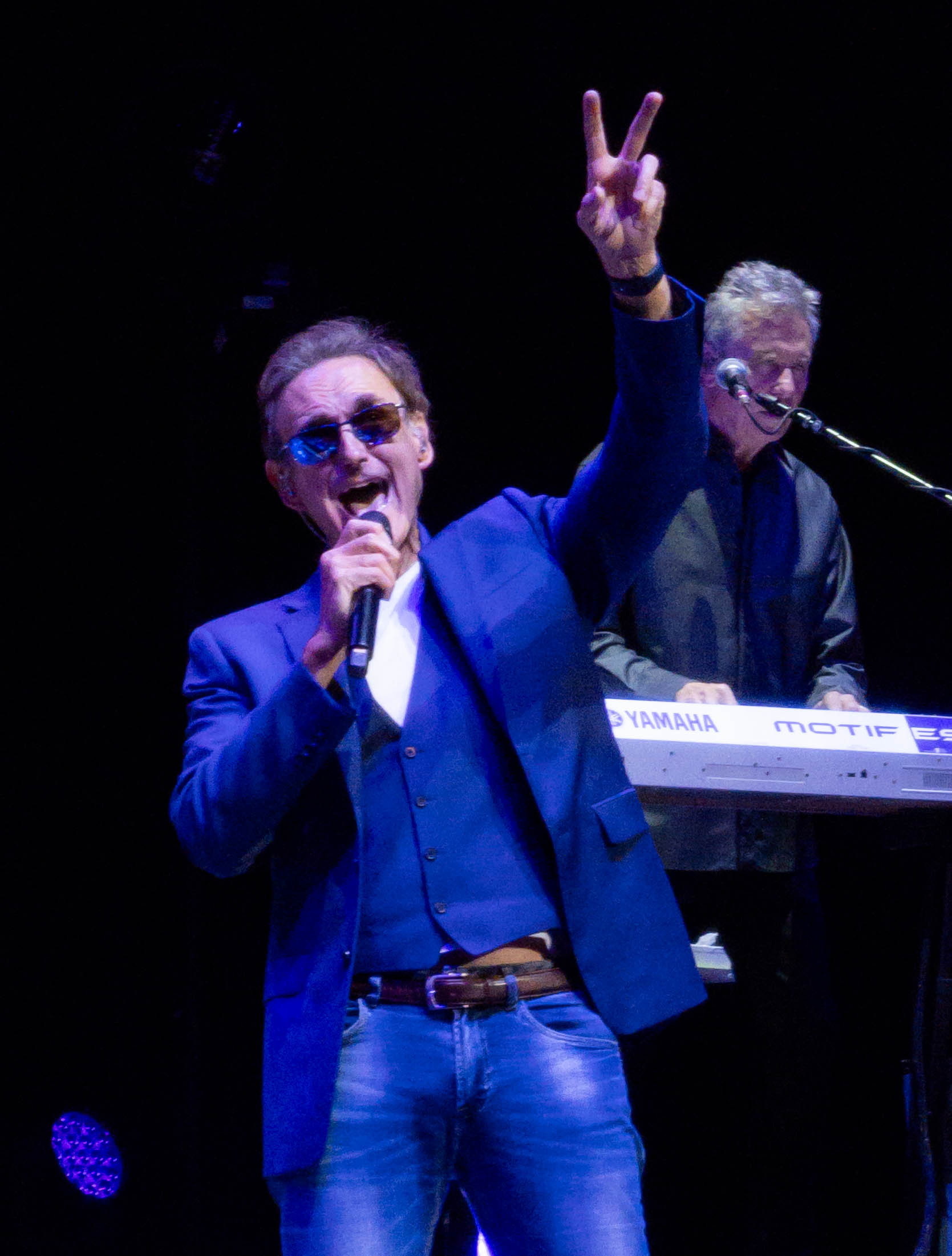
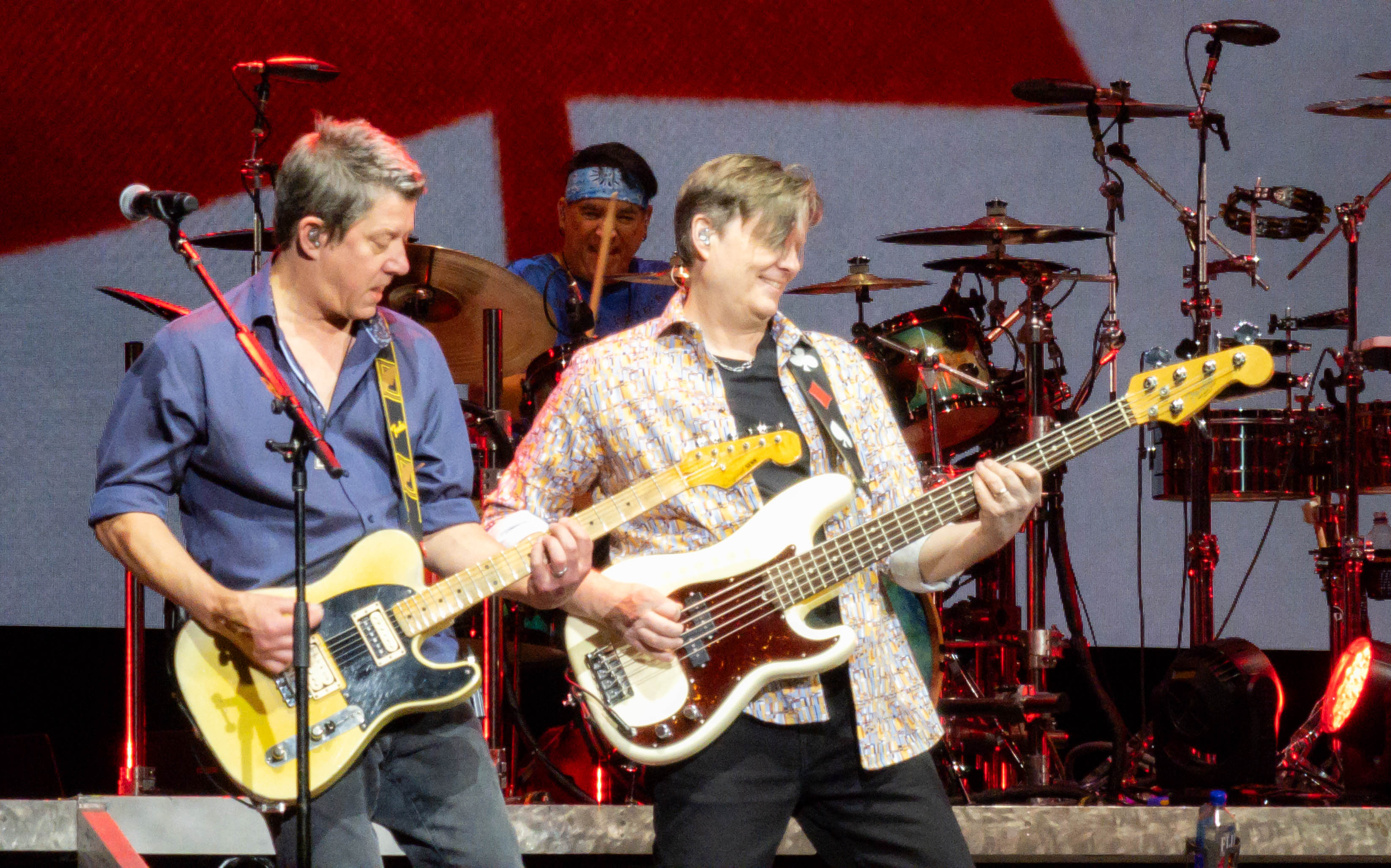
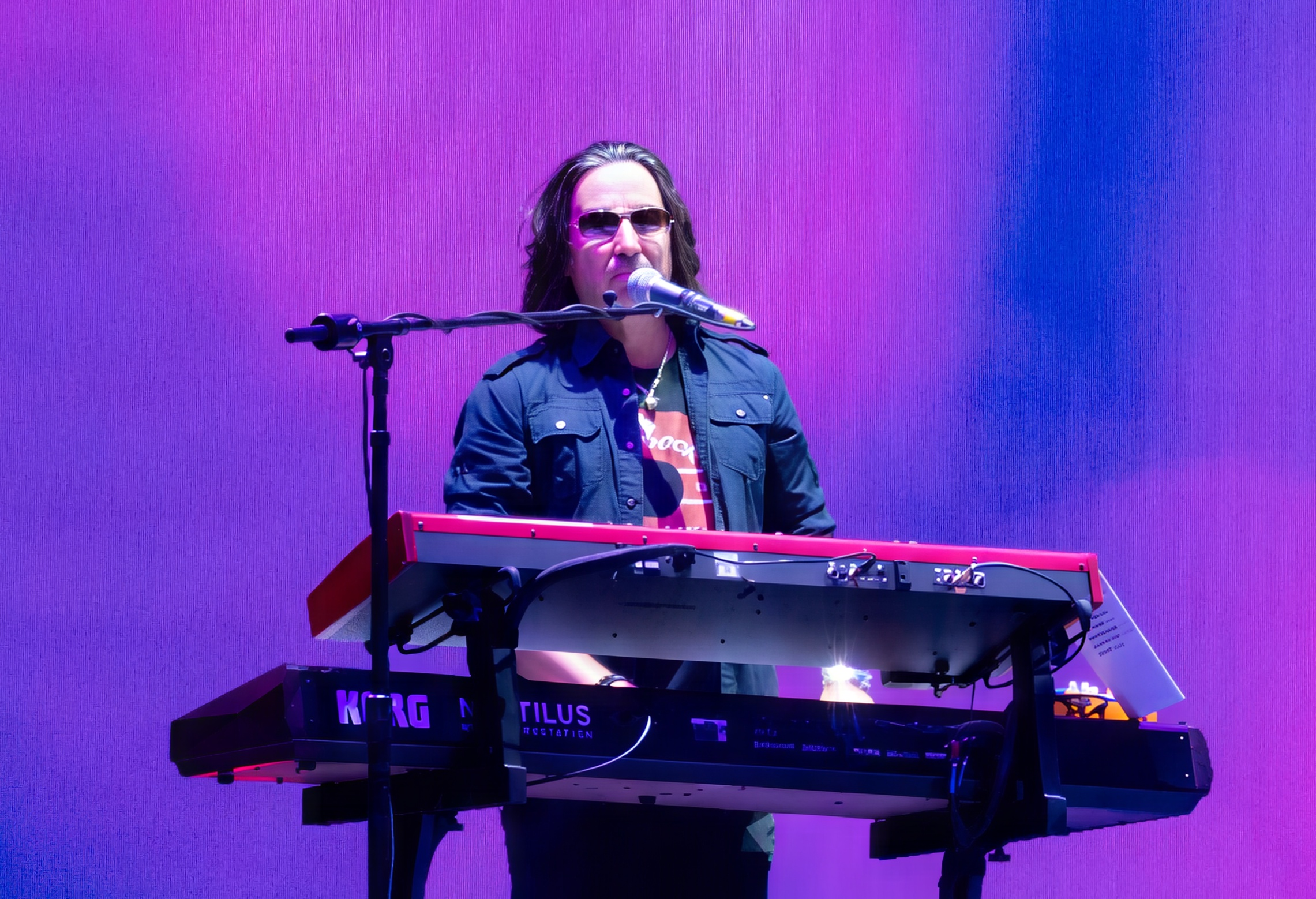
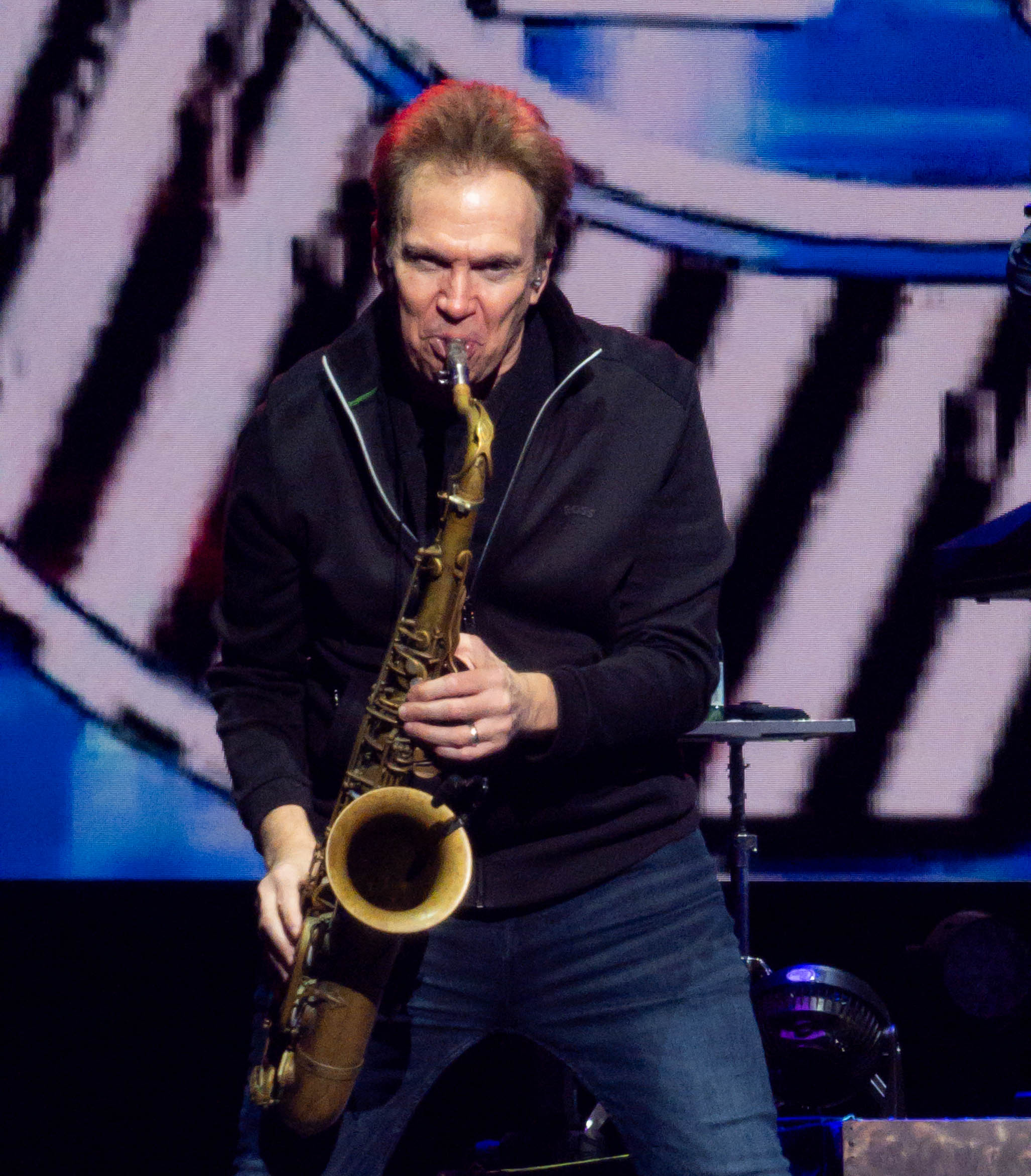
Chicago performing in 2024 (clockwise from top left: Neil Donell, Tony Obrohta, Eric Baines, Ray Herrmann, Loren Gold)

Chicago received a Grammy Lifetime Achievement Award on October 16, 2020.

On April 19, 2021, Walter Parazaider released a statement that he has been diagnosed with Alzheimer's disease.

During their 2021 summer tour, Lou Pardini was out for part of August and most of September, with Who keyboardist Loren Gold filling in until Pardini was able to return. On November 15, 2021, Howland broke his arm in an accident and took a leave of absence from the band, with guitarist Tony Obrohta filling in for him at shows. On December 1, 2021, Howland announced he was leaving Chicago after over 26 years, citing the recent accident and lengthy recovery period as bringing about the next phase of his life. The band confirmed Howland's departure, and removed his name from band lineup page on their website. Tony Obrohta officially joined the group to replace Howland in December 2021.

In November 2021, Chicago and Brian Wilson of the Beach Boys announced they would co-headline a 25 date tour in the summer of 2022.

On January 21, 2022, Lou Pardini announced he was departing the band. Loren Gold (vocals, keyboards) appeared with the group on tour filling the role vacated by Pardini starting in January 2022, and on March 2, 2022, Chicago updated their website to list Gold as a band member. On Friday, May 6, 2022, Chicago announced on their website that Brett Simons had departed the band and Eric Baines (bass, vocals) had joined the group. The group also announced plans to release a new album in the summer of 2022. Chicago released the single "If This Is Goodbye" on May 20, 2022. On July 15, 2022, Chicago released Chicago XXXVIII: Born for This Moment. Chicago and Earth, Wind & Fire toured together on the 2024 Heart and Soul joint tour.

On March 2, 2025, Carlos Murguia joined Chicago on keyboards and vocals. Starting in the summer of 2025, Lamm and Pankow both stopped touring with the band due to health concerns, leaving Loughnane as the only original member performing on stage. In December 2025, it was announced that Chicago and Styx would be "co-headlining" twenty-five tour dates in 2026. Lee Loughnane is the only original member of the group depicted in the promotional photograph for that tour. In April 2026, it was stated by Loughnane that Lamm and Pankow are not touring, but they both remain members of the band.

In February 2026, music news outlets reported that Loren Gold had joined the band Rush as a touring keyboardist for the band's 2026 reunion tour. Gold was subsequently removed from the list of members on the band's website, effectively confirming his departure, with Justin Avery joining the band on keyboards and vocals in his place. On June 1, 2026, tenor vocalist Rudy Cardenas joined the group, replacing the departing Neil Donell. Trombonist Nick Lane also became a band member in June 2026, taking over duties for Pankow.

On June 17, 2026, Walter Parazaider died of complications from Alzheimer's disease.

== Approaches to music ==
=== Style ===
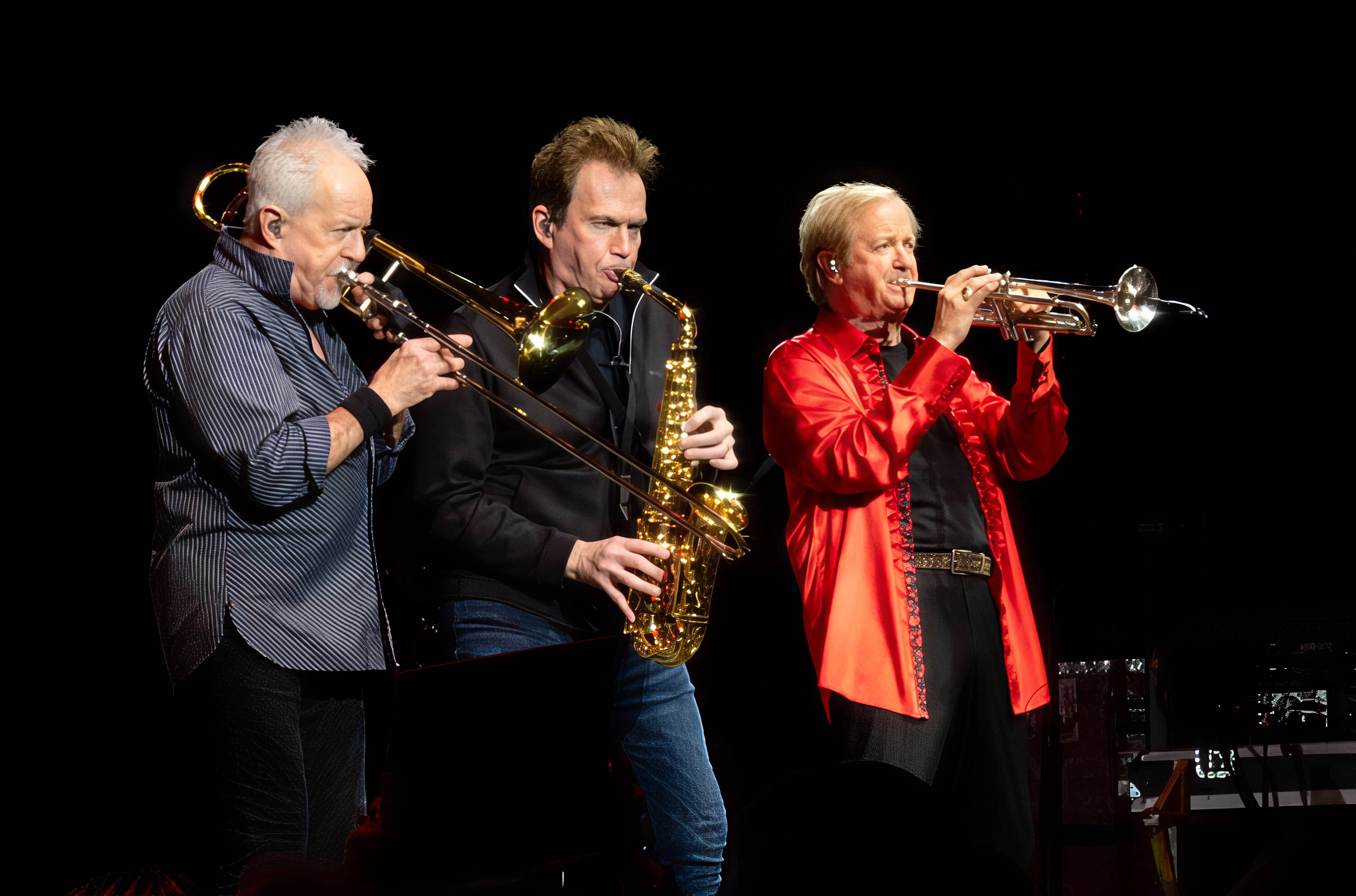
Chicago's horn section, 2024 (left to right: James Pankow, Ray Herrmann, Lee Loughnane)

During his discussion of the formation of the band, original drummer Danny Seraphine says he wanted to form a group of talented, skilled musicians, with a horn section, "that could play an inventive mix of rock and jazz." Walter Parazaider told writer, Paul Elliott, "My idea was to make horns an integral part of a rock band." According to James Pankow, Chicago set out to be "basically" a rock and roll band with a horn section. Robert Lamm credits Walter Parazaider and Terry Kath for having the vision of "a rock band with expanded instrumentation." Peter Robb wrote, "The guys had all been influenced by show bands that would come into Chicago playing a variety of music. Those bands always had tenor sax, trumpet and trombone, Loughnane said."

On the occasion of the band's 50th anniversary, Bobby Olivier, writing for Billboard, described its style as "chameleonic ... shifting from esoteric jazz-rock, funk and soul to ... adult contemporary ...". In a piece for Ultimate Classic Rock, writer Jeff Giles details the band's journey from being a "progressive-leaning rock band with horns" in its earlier years to "an adult contemporary act" by the end of the 1980s "in order to stay commercially relevant."

In a 2021 interview published in Prog, Robert Lamm asserts that Chicago is and always has been a progressive rock band and that they were particularly influenced by Yes and King Crimson to write and record their lengthier tracks. In his view, the hit songs on their albums satisfied the record companies and allowed the band more freedom on the rest of the recorded material. As musicians, the group has always "felt blessed enough to try anything at any time."

Chicago was deeply influenced by jazz, which culminated on their seventh album. Trumpeter Lee Loughnane holds that the term "jazz rock" was invented because of Chicago's music. When asked why the band didn't continue in its "jazzy improv" direction, Loughnane voiced his opinion that how the songwriters wrote was "materially affected" by changes in payment of royalties by the record companies and by the relatively short airplay time allowed for a song on the radio.

=== Songwriting ===
James Pankow has described the group's songwriting process as "organic", where one person comes up with a song and the other members come up with ideas for their parts. Pankow, one of the songwriters for the group, also has typically been arranger for the horn section. Robert Lamm, another of the group's songwriters, sees the group members' contributions to individual songs more as arranging than co-writing, and says his songs were "enhanced" in the process.

=== Horn section ===
According to the Daily Press, Chicago's horn section was "the foundation of the sound that launched the band to stardom in the 1970s." Horns arranger James Pankow, speaking in 2017, said that when the band was being formed, they discussed how to make the horns a "main character in a song". He said the horns are a big part of the band's "signature" and that he "took a melodic lead-voice approach to our horns, where the horn section becomes another lead vocal and interweaves in and around the actual vocals and becomes a part of the story of the song." In a separate interview that same year, Lee Loughnane echoed Pankow's remarks.

=== Political topics ===
Early in their career, Chicago actively explored political themes in their songs, with Robert Lamm being the most politically active member. Beginning with 1972's Chicago V, the band began to move away from their politically oriented music and toward the mainstream.

On their debut album, the songs "Prologue, August 29, 1968" and "Someday (August 29, 1968)" features audio recordings of protests from the 1968 Democratic National Convention — including the crowd chanting "The whole world is watching". The second album features "It Better End Soon" a four-part suite that is a direct, scathing critique of the Vietnam War. The two-part song "Dialogue (Part I & II)" is a structured exchange between two opposing viewpoints — one politically neutral and the other more socially oriented — before concluding with an affirmative refrain calling for collective action. The song "Harry Truman" was written after the resignation of US President Richard Nixon; the lyrics are a tribute to the former president, whom Lamm believed Americans could trust. The song "All the Years" from their late album Stone of Sisyphus touches on the political situation of the early nineties, and that politics hasn't changed much since the late sixties.

The liner notes for second album Chicago contain a dedication written by Robert Lamm: "With this album, we dedicate ourselves, our futures and our energies to the people of the revolution. And the revolution in all of its forms." The Chicago III album included a poster showing the band members in American war uniforms standing in front of a field of crosses symbolizing those killed in the ongoing Vietnam War, along with the number of casualties from each war up to the time of the album's release. The packaging for the Chicago at Carnegie Hall concert album contained strong political messages, including voter registration information.

== Public image ==
=== Graphics ===
Chicago logo

Upon being renamed from Chicago Transit Authority to Chicago, the band sported a new logo. Its inspiration was found in the design of the Coca-Cola logo, in the attitude of the city of Chicago itself, and in the desire to visually transcend the individual identities of the band's members. It was designed by the art director of Columbia/CBS Records, John Berg, with each album's graphic art work being done by Nick Fasciano. Berg said, "The Chicago logo...was fashioned for me by Nick Fasciano from my sketch."

The logo would serve as the band's chief visual icon from Chicago II onward. In various artistic forms and visual similes, it has been the subject of every subsequent album cover, except the fifteenth album, Greatest Hits, Volume II. For example, it appeared as an American flag on III, a piece of wood on V, a U.S. dollar bill on VI, a leather relief on VII, an embroidered patch on VIII, a chocolate bar on X, a map on XI, a building on 13, a fingerprint on XIV, a computer silicon chip on 16, a parcel on 17, a mosaic on 18, and an aquarelle on 19. Chicago IX's incarnation was a caricature of the band itself, in the shape of the logo.

The album cover series has endured as a cataloged work of art in its own right, described by Paul Nini of the American Institute of Graphic Arts as a "real landmark in record cover design". In 2013, the iconic status of Chicago's album art was featured in a New York art museum exhibit, which centered upon ninety-five album covers completely selected from John Berg's career portfolio of hundreds. Having overseen the design of approximately fourteen Chicago album covers across more than twenty years, Berg stated that this artistic success resulted from the combination of Chicago's "unique situation" and his position in "the best possible job at the best possible time to have that job, at the center of the graphic universe". Berg won the 1976 Grammy Award for Best Album Package for Chicago X, one of four Grammy Awards he won in his lifetime.

The book titled Type and Image: The Language of Graphic Design described the logo as "a warm vernacular form, executed in thick script letters with Victorian swashes in the tradition of sports teams and orange crate labels". The book mentions the cultural and material background of the city of Chicago as inspiration for the logo; for example, describing the leather embossing of Chicago VII as representative of the great fire and the stockades. The author connects the album art to the atmosphere of the band's namesake city, quoting the band's original manager, James William Guercio: "The printed word can never aspire to document a truly musical experience, so if you must call them something, speak of the city where all save one were born; where all of them were schooled and bred, and where all of this incredible music went down barely noticed; call them CHICAGO."

=== Philanthropy ===
Chicago has supported numerous charitable causes throughout the years.

In the 2010s the group had an ongoing partnership with the American Cancer Society. Fans were given the opportunity to bid to sing their song "If You Leave Me Now" with them on stage during their live performances. The proceeds went to the American Cancer Society to fund the Society's efforts to fight breast cancer.

The group gave a benefit performance for Musicians on Call, on Sunday April 23, 2023, held at the Hard Rock Cafe in Times Square in New York City. Musicians on Call is a nonprofit organization that brings live and recorded music to the bedsides of patients, families and caregivers in healthcare settings. The group donated an autographed guitar to the event's live auction and the $6,000 winning bid was made by singer Dionne Warwick. Chicago also did benefit performances for Musicians on Call in 2011, 2012, and 2022.

== Legacy ==
Chicago's music has been used in the soundtracks of movies, television programs and commercials. Cetera's composition from the 1976 album Chicago X, "If You Leave Me Now", has appeared in the movies, Three Kings (1999), Shaun of the Dead (2004), A Lot like Love (2005), Happy Feet (2006), and Daddy's Home 2 (2017); the television series Sex and the City and South Park; the first episode of the HBO miniseries, The Regime, in 2024; and a television commercial that aired during the 2000 Super Bowl. Robert Lamm's song from the 1970 album Chicago II, "25 or 6 to 4", was used in the 2017 film I, Tonya, and on the animated TV series King of the Hill. "You're the Inspiration" was used for the soundtracks of the movies A Hologram for the King (2016) and Deadpool (2016); a 2017 Super Bowl commercial; and the television series It's Always Sunny in Philadelphia and Criminal Minds. The song "Hearts In Trouble" was on the soundtrack to the 1990 film Days of Thunder.

Other recording artists have covered Chicago's music. According to the website SecondHandSongs, "If You Leave Me Now" has been covered by over 90 recording artists from around the world, "Hard to Say I'm Sorry" by over 30, "Colour My World" by over 24, and "You're the Inspiration" by over 18. In 2019, a reimagined hip-hop version of "25 or 6 to 4" by indie rapper realnamejames was featured in recruitment for the U.S. Army's "What's Your Warrior" marketing campaign.

Chicago's music has long been a staple of marching bands in the U.S. "25 or 6 to 4" was named as the number one marching band song by Kevin Coffey of the Omaha World-Herald, and as performed by the Jackson State University marching band, ranked number seven of the "Top 20 Cover Songs of 2018 by HBCU Bands". The band performed "Saturday in the Park" and "25 or 6 to 4" with the Notre Dame Marching Band on the football field during halftime on October 21, 2017. They performed again at a game against Bowling Green State University on October 5, 2019.

== Personnel ==
As of 2018, the three remaining original members of Chicago were Robert Lamm, Lee Loughnane, and James Pankow.

Since 2025, the band has included Loughnane as the only original member on stage, with Lamm and Pankow not touring due to health problems. On December 1, 2025, USA Today published a promotional photograph of the band for its upcoming 2026 summer tour with Styx, with neither Lamm nor Pankow featured in the photo. In April 2026, Loughnane confirmed that Lamm and Pankow have stopped touring, but remain band members.

=== Band legal structure ===
The legal hierarchy of the band was illuminated in a July 2022 published interview with Robert Lamm, in which he, Pankow and Loughnane are identified as the "partners" and the rest of the members as "contracted players". According to Lamm, the three partners have the final word on the band's activity, including the decision to record the 2022 album, Born for This Moment.

=== Status of Walter Parazaider ===
For several years, the exact status of Walter Parazaider as a current member or former member was unclear. A 2017 article said Parazaider retired due to a heart condition, but was still "technically" part of the group. Another 2017 article said that Ray Herrmann had become a full-time touring member, but that "Parazaider is still a band member and performs with the group for certain events." According to a 2018 article, Parazaider "officially retired" in 2017. By August 10, 2018, Ray Herrmann was shown as a member of the band, and Parazaider was not, on the group's official website. While Parazaider at times had been referred to as a non-touring member of the group, he did not appear on either of the studio albums released following his retirement, 2019's Chicago Christmas, and 2022's Born for This Moment. In 2021, Parazaider revealed he had been diagnosed with Alzheimer's disease. It was announced on June 17, 2026, that he had died.

=== Current members ===
==== Original band partners ====
- Robert Lamm – keyboards, lead and backing vocals (1967–present; not touring 2025–present)
- Lee Loughnane – trumpet, flugelhorn, backing vocals (1967–present)
- James Pankow – trombone, backing vocals (1967–present; not touring 2025–present)

==== Contracted band members ====
- Walfredo Reyes Jr. – drums (2018–present); percussion (2012–2018)
- Ray Herrmann – saxophones, flute, clarinet, backing vocals (2016-present; touring substitute 2005–2016)
- Ramon "Ray" Yslas – percussion (2018–present)
- Tony Obrohta – guitar, backing vocals (2021–present; touring substitute November 2021)
- Eric Baines – bass, lead and backing vocals (2022–present)
- Carlos Murguia - keyboards, lead and backing vocals (2025–present; touring substitute 2023-2024)
- Justin Avery – keyboards, lead and backing vocals (2026–present)
- Rudy Cardenas – lead and backing vocals (2026–present)
- Nick Lane – trombone, backing vocals (2026–present; touring substitute 1999–2026)

=== Lineups ===
1967 (as "The Big Thing")	1967–1974	1974–1978	1978–1980
Terry Kath – guitar, vocals; Robert Lamm – keyboards, bass pedals, vocals; Lee Loughnane – trumpet, flugelhorn, backing vocals; James Pankow – trombone, backing vocals; Walter Parazaider – saxophones, flute, backing vocals; Danny Seraphine – drums	Peter Cetera – bass, vocals; Terry Kath – guitar, vocals; Robert Lamm – keyboards, vocals; Lee Loughnane – trumpet, flugelhorn, backing vocals; James Pankow – trombone, backing vocals; Walter Parazaider – saxophones, flute, backing vocals; Danny Seraphine – drums; Touring musicians: Laudir de Oliveira – percussion (1973–1974)	Peter Cetera – bass, vocals; Terry Kath – guitar, vocals; Robert Lamm – keyboards, vocals; Lee Loughnane – trumpet, flugelhorn, backing vocals; James Pankow – trombone, backing vocals; Walter Parazaider – saxophones, flute, backing vocals; Danny Seraphine – drums; Laudir de Oliveira – percussion	Peter Cetera – bass, vocals; Robert Lamm – keyboards, vocals; Lee Loughnane – trumpet, flugelhorn, backing vocals; James Pankow – trombone, backing vocals; Walter Parazaider – saxophones, flute, backing vocals; Danny Seraphine – drums; Laudir de Oliveira – percussion; Donnie Dacus – guitar, vocals
1980–1981	1981–1985	1985–1986	1986–1990
Peter Cetera – bass, vocals; Robert Lamm – keyboards, vocals; Lee Loughnane – trumpet, flugelhorn, backing vocals; James Pankow – trombone, backing vocals; Walter Parazaider – saxophones, flute, backing vocals; Danny Seraphine – drums; Laudir de Oliveira – percussion; Chris Pinnick – guitar; Touring musicians: Marty Grebb – saxophone, guitar, keyboards, backing vocals (1980–1981)	Peter Cetera – bass, vocals; Robert Lamm – keyboards, vocals; Lee Loughnane – trumpet, flugelhorn, backing vocals; James Pankow – trombone, backing vocals; Walter Parazaider – saxophones, flute, backing vocals; Danny Seraphine – drums; Chris Pinnick – guitar; Bill Champlin – keyboards, vocals; Touring musicians: Kenny Cetera – percussion, backing vocals (1984–1985)	Robert Lamm – keyboards, vocals; Lee Loughnane – trumpet, flugelhorn, backing vocals; James Pankow – trombone, backing vocals; Walter Parazaider – saxophones, flute, backing vocals; Danny Seraphine – drums; Bill Champlin – keyboards, vocals; Jason Scheff – bass, vocals	Robert Lamm – keyboards, vocals; Lee Loughnane – trumpet, flugelhorn, backing vocals; James Pankow – trombone, backing vocals; Walter Parazaider – saxophones, flute, backing vocals; Danny Seraphine – drums; Bill Champlin – keyboards, vocals; Jason Scheff – bass, vocals; Dawayne Bailey – guitar, vocals
1990–1995	1995	1995–2009	2009
Robert Lamm – keyboards, vocals; Lee Loughnane – trumpet, flugelhorn, backing vocals; James Pankow – trombone, backing vocals; Walter Parazaider – saxophones, flute, backing vocals; Bill Champlin – keyboards, vocals; Jason Scheff – bass, vocals; Dawayne Bailey – guitar, vocals; Tris Imboden – drums, harmonica; Touring musicians: Steve Jankowski – trumpet (sub for Loughnane 1992); Lee Thornburg – trumpet (sub for Loughnane 1992)	Robert Lamm – keyboards, vocals; Lee Loughnane – trumpet, flugelhorn, backing vocals; James Pankow – trombone, backing vocals; Walter Parazaider – saxophones, flute, backing vocals; Bill Champlin – keyboards, vocals; Jason Scheff – bass, vocals; Tris Imboden – drums, harmonica; Bruce Gaitsch – guitar	Robert Lamm – keyboards, vocals; Lee Loughnane – trumpet, flugelhorn, backing vocals; James Pankow – trombone, backing vocals; Walter Parazaider – saxophones, flute, backing vocals; Bill Champlin – keyboards, vocals; Jason Scheff – bass, vocals; Tris Imboden – drums, harmonica; Keith Howland – guitar, backing vocals; Touring musicians: Nick Lane – trombone (sub for Pankow 1999–2009); Lou Pardini – keyboards, vocals (sub for Champlin for a few shows 1999, 2007); Larry Klimas – saxophones, flute (sub for Parazaider 2003–2009); Ray Herrmann – saxophones, flute (sub for Parazaider 2005–2009); Tom Timko – saxophones, flute (sub for Parazaider 2005); Steve Jankowski – trumpet (sub for Loughnane 2006, 2007); Lee Thornburg – trumpet (sub for Loughnane 2008, 2009); Drew Hester – drums (sub for Imboden 2009)	Robert Lamm – keyboards, vocals; Lee Loughnane – trumpet, flugelhorn, backing vocals; James Pankow – trombone, backing vocals; Walter Parazaider – saxophones, flute, backing vocals; Jason Scheff – bass, vocals; Tris Imboden – drums, harmonica; Keith Howland – guitar, backing vocals; Lou Pardini – keyboards, vocals; Touring musicians: Nick Lane – trombone (sub for Pankow 2009); Larry Klimas – saxophones, flute (sub for Parazaider 2009); Ray Herrmann – saxophones, flute (sub for Parazaider 2009); Drew Hester – drums (sub for Imboden 2009)
2009–2012	2012	2012–2016	2016–2018
Robert Lamm – keyboards, vocals; Lee Loughnane – trumpet, flugelhorn, backing vocals; James Pankow – trombone, backing vocals; Walter Parazaider – saxophones, flute, backing vocals; Jason Scheff – bass, vocals; Tris Imboden – drums, harmonica; Keith Howland – guitar, backing vocals; Lou Pardini – keyboards, vocals; Drew Hester – percussion; Touring musicians: Nick Lane – trombone (sub for Pankow 2009–2012); Larry Klimas – saxophones, flute (sub for Parazaider 2009–2012); Ray Herrmann – saxophones, flute (sub for Parazaider 2009–2012); Art Velasco – trombone (sub for Pankow 2011)	Robert Lamm – keyboards, vocals; Lee Loughnane – trumpet, flugelhorn, backing vocals; James Pankow – trombone, backing vocals; Walter Parazaider – saxophones, flute, backing vocals; Jason Scheff – bass, vocals; Tris Imboden – drums, harmonica; Keith Howland – guitar, backing vocals; Lou Pardini – keyboards, vocals; Daniel de los Reyes – percussion; Touring musicians: Nick Lane – trombone (sub for Pankow 2012); Larry Klimas – saxophones, flute (sub for Parazaider 2012); Ray Herrmann – saxophones, flute (sub for Parazaider 2012)	Robert Lamm – keyboards, vocals; Lee Loughnane – trumpet, flugelhorn, backing vocals; James Pankow – trombone, backing vocals; Walter Parazaider – saxophones, flute, backing vocals; Jason Scheff – bass, vocals; Tris Imboden – drums, harmonica; Keith Howland – guitar, backing vocals; Lou Pardini – keyboards, vocals; Walfredo Reyes Jr. – percussion; Touring musicians: Nick Lane – trombone (sub for Pankow 2012–2016); Larry Klimas – saxophones, flute (sub for Parazaider 2012); Ray Herrmann – saxophones, flute (sub for Parazaider 2012–2016); Lee Thornburg – trumpet (sub for Loughnane 2012); Jeff Coffey – bass, vocals (sub for Scheff 2016)	Robert Lamm – keyboards, vocals; Lee Loughnane – trumpet, flugelhorn, backing vocals; James Pankow – trombone, backing vocals; Walter Parazaider – saxophones, flute, backing vocals ("officially retired" in 2017); Tris Imboden – drums, harmonica; Keith Howland – guitar, backing vocals; Lou Pardini – keyboards, vocals; Walfredo Reyes Jr. – percussion; Jeff Coffey – bass, vocals, occasional guitar; Ray Herrmann – saxophones, flute, backing vocals; Touring musicians: Nick Lane – trombone (sub for Pankow 2016–2018); Larry Klimas – saxophones, flute (sub for Herrmann 2016–2018)
January – May 2018	May – July 2018	July 2018–December 2021	December 2021 – January 2022
Robert Lamm – keyboards, vocals; Lee Loughnane – trumpet, flugelhorn, backing vocals; James Pankow – trombone, backing vocals; Walter Parazaider – saxophones, flute, backing vocals ("officially retired"); Keith Howland – guitar, backing vocals; Lou Pardini – keyboards, vocals; Walfredo Reyes Jr. – drums; Ray Herrmann – saxophones, flute, backing vocals; Neil Donell – vocals, acoustic guitar; Brett Simons – bass, backing vocals; Daniel de los Reyes – percussion; Touring musicians: Nick Lane – trombone (sub for Pankow 2018); Larry Klimas – saxophones, flute (sub for Herrmann 2018)	Robert Lamm – keyboards, vocals; Lee Loughnane – trumpet, flugelhorn, backing vocals; James Pankow – trombone, backing vocals; Walter Parazaider – saxophones, flute, backing vocals ("officially retired"); Keith Howland – guitar, backing vocals; Lou Pardini – keyboards, vocals; Walfredo Reyes Jr. – drums; Ray Herrmann – saxophones, flute, backing vocals; Neil Donell – vocals, acoustic guitar; Brett Simons – bass, backing vocals; Ramon "Ray" Yslas – percussion; Touring musicians: Nick Lane – trombone (sub for Pankow 2018); Larry Klimas – saxophones, flute (sub for Herrmann 2018)	Robert Lamm – keyboards, vocals; Lee Loughnane – trumpet, flugelhorn, backing vocals; James Pankow – trombone, backing vocals; Keith Howland – guitar, backing vocals; Lou Pardini – keyboards, vocals; Walfredo Reyes Jr. – drums; Ray Herrmann – saxophones, flute, backing vocals; Neil Donell – vocals, acoustic guitar; Brett Simons – bass, backing vocals; Ramon "Ray" Yslas – percussion; Touring musicians: Nick Lane – trombone (sub for Pankow 2018–2021); Larry Klimas – saxophones, flute (sub for Herrmann 2018–2021); Loren Gold – keyboards, vocals (sub for Pardini 2021); Tony Obrohta – guitar, backing vocals (sub for Howland 2021)	Robert Lamm – keyboards, vocals; Lee Loughnane – trumpet, flugelhorn, backing vocals; James Pankow – trombone, backing vocals; Lou Pardini – keyboards, vocals; Walfredo Reyes Jr. – drums; Ray Herrmann – saxophones, flute, backing vocals; Neil Donell – vocals, acoustic guitar; Brett Simons – bass, backing vocals; Ramon "Ray" Yslas – percussion; Tony Obrohta – guitar, backing vocals; Touring musicians: Nick Lane – trombone (sub for Pankow 2021–2022); Larry Klimas – saxophones, flute (sub for Herrmann 2021–2022)
January – March 2022	March – May 2022	May 2022 – March 2025	March 2025 – February 2026
Robert Lamm – keyboards, vocals; Lee Loughnane – trumpet, flugelhorn, backing vocals; James Pankow – trombone, backing vocals; Walfredo Reyes Jr. – drums; Ray Herrmann – saxophones, flute, backing vocals; Neil Donell – vocals, acoustic guitar; Brett Simons – bass, backing vocals; Ramon "Ray" Yslas – percussion; Tony Obrohta – guitar, backing vocals; Touring musicians: Nick Lane – trombone (sub for Pankow 2022); Larry Klimas – saxophones, flute (sub for Herrmann 2022); Loren Gold – keyboards, vocals	Robert Lamm – keyboards, vocals; Lee Loughnane – trumpet, flugelhorn, backing vocals; James Pankow – trombone, backing vocals; Walfredo Reyes Jr. – drums; Ray Herrmann – saxophones, flute, backing vocals; Neil Donell – vocals, acoustic guitar; Brett Simons – bass, backing vocals; Ramon "Ray" Yslas – percussion; Tony Obrohta – guitar, backing vocals; Loren Gold – keyboards, vocals; Touring musicians: Nick Lane – trombone (sub for Pankow 2022); Larry Klimas – saxophones, flute (sub for Herrmann 2022); Rob Arthur – keyboards, vocals (sub for Gold 2022)	Robert Lamm – keyboards, vocals; Lee Loughnane – trumpet, flugelhorn, backing vocals; James Pankow – trombone, backing vocals; Walfredo Reyes Jr. – drums; Ray Herrmann – saxophones, flute, backing vocals; Neil Donell – vocals, acoustic guitar; Ramon "Ray" Yslas – percussion; Tony Obrohta – guitar, backing vocals; Loren Gold – keyboards, vocals; Eric Baines – bass, vocals; Touring musicians: Nick Lane – trombone (sub for Pankow 2022–2025); Larry Klimas – saxophones, flute (sub for Herrmann 2022–2025); Rob Arthur – keyboards, vocals (sub for Gold 2022); Carlos Murguia – keyboards, vocals (sub for Gold 2023/Lamm 2024)	Robert Lamm – keyboards, vocals (non-touring); Lee Loughnane – trumpet, flugelhorn, backing vocals; James Pankow – trombone, backing vocals (non-touring); Walfredo Reyes Jr. – drums; Ray Herrmann – saxophones, flute, backing vocals; Neil Donell – vocals, acoustic guitar; Ramon "Ray" Yslas – percussion; Tony Obrohta – guitar, backing vocals; Loren Gold – keyboards, vocals; Eric Baines – bass, vocals; Carlos Murguia – keyboards, vocals; Touring musicians: Nick Lane – trombone (sub for Pankow 2025–2026); Larry Klimas – saxophones, flute (sub for Herrmann 2025–2026)
February – June 2026	June 2026 – present		
Robert Lamm – keyboards, vocals (non-touring); Lee Loughnane – trumpet, flugelhorn, backing vocals; James Pankow – trombone, backing vocals (non-touring); Walfredo Reyes Jr. – drums; Ray Herrmann – saxophones, flute, backing vocals; Neil Donell – vocals, acoustic guitar; Ramon "Ray" Yslas – percussion; Tony Obrohta – guitar, backing vocals; Eric Baines – bass, vocals; Carlos Murguia – keyboards, vocals; Justin Avery – keyboards, vocals; Touring musicians: Nick Lane – trombone (sub for Pankow 2026); Larry Klimas – saxophones, flute (sub for Herrmann 2026)	Robert Lamm – keyboards, vocals (non-touring); Lee Loughnane – trumpet, flugelhorn, backing vocals; James Pankow – trombone, backing vocals (non-touring); Walfredo Reyes Jr. – drums; Ray Herrmann – saxophones, flute, backing vocals; Ramon "Ray" Yslas – percussion; Tony Obrohta – guitar, backing vocals; Eric Baines – bass, vocals; Carlos Murguia – keyboards, vocals; Justin Avery – keyboards, vocals; Rudy Cardenas – vocals; Nick Lane – trombone, backing vocals; Touring musicians: Larry Klimas – saxophones, flute (sub for Herrmann 2026)		

== Discography ==
=== Studio albums ===
- Chicago Transit Authority (1969)
- Chicago a.k.a. Chicago II (1970)
- Chicago III (1971)
- Chicago V (1972)
- Chicago VI (1973)
- Chicago VII (1974)
- Chicago VIII (1975)
- Chicago X (1976)
- Chicago XI (1977)
- Hot Streets (1978)
- Chicago 13 (1979)
- Chicago XIV (1980)
- Chicago 16 (1982)
- Chicago 17 (1984)
- Chicago 18 (1986)
- Chicago 19 (1988)
- Twenty 1 (1991)
- Night & Day: Big Band (1995)
- Chicago XXV: The Christmas Album (1998, reissued with six new tracks added as What's It Gonna Be, Santa? in 2003)
- Chicago XXX (2006)
- Chicago XXXII: Stone of Sisyphus (2008)
- Chicago XXXIII: O Christmas Three (2011)
- Chicago XXXV: The Nashville Sessions (2013)
- Chicago XXXVI: Now (2014)
- Chicago XXXVII: Chicago Christmas (2019)
- Chicago XXXVIII: Born for This Moment (2022)

=== Live albums ===
- Chicago at Carnegie Hall (1971)
- Chicago XXVI: Live in Concert (1999)
- Chicago XXXIV: Live in '75 (2011)

== Videography ==
- Chicago: And the Band Played On (1992, Warner Reprise Video)
- Chicago: In Concert at the Greek Theater (1993, Warner Reprise Video)
- Soundstage Presents Chicago Live in Concert… (2004, Koch Vision)
- Chicago and Earth, Wind & Fire Live at the Greek Theater (2004, Image Entertainment)
- Chicago & Friends: In Concert! (2024, Brian Lockwood)

== Television and film ==
=== As major subject ===
- Chicago in the Rockies (1973, ABC television special)
- Chicago... Meanwhile, Back at the Ranch (1974, ABC television special)
- Chicago's New Year's Rockin' Eve 1975 (December 31, 1974, ABC television special)
- ABC In Concert (1992, two-part television special)
- "Chicago: Behind the Music #133" (2000, VH1 documentary television episode)
- Now More Than Ever: The History of Chicago (2017, documentary film)
- The Last Band on Stage (2022, documentary)

=== Other television and film appearances ===
- Duke Ellington... We Love You Madly (1973, CBS television special)
- Electra Glide in Blue (1973, film)
- Saturday Night Live (1979, NBC)
- Clear History (2013, HBO)
- The Terry Kath Experience (2015, documentary film)

== Awards and honors ==
American Music Awards
Year	Category	Result	Ref.
1977	Favorite Pop/Rock Band/Duo/Group	Won	
1986	Favorite Pop/Rock Band/Duo/Group	Won	

Grammy Awards
Award show year	Category	Work	Awardee(s)/nominee(s)	Result	Ref.
1970	Best New Artist of the Year (1969)		Chicago	Nominated	
1971	Album of the Year	Chicago	Chicago	Nominated	
1971	Contemporary Vocal Group	Chicago	Chicago	Nominated	
1971	Best Album Cover	Chicago	John Berg & Nick Fasciano	Nominated	
1974	Best Album Package	Chicago VI	John Berg	Nominated	
1977	Album of the Year	Chicago X	Chicago	Nominated	
1977	Record of the Year	"If You Leave Me Now"	Chicago	Nominated	
1977	Best Album Package	Chicago X	John Berg	Won	
1977	Best Arrangement, Instrumental and Vocals	"If You Leave Me Now"	James William Guercio & Jimmie Haskell	Won	
1977	Best Pop Vocal Performance By a Duo, Group or Chorus	"If You Leave Me Now"	Chicago	Won	
1980	Best Album Package	Chicago 13	Tony Lane	Nominated	
1981	Best Album Package	Chicago XIV	John Berg	Nominated	
1983	Pop Vocal Group	"Hard To Say I'm Sorry"	Chicago	Nominated	
1985	Record of the Year	"Hard Habit To Break" (Single)	Chicago	Nominated	
1985	Best Pop Vocal Performance By a Duo, Group or Chorus	"Hard Habit To Break" (Single)	Chicago	Nominated	
1985	Best Engineered Album, Non-Classical	Chicago 17	Humberto Gatica	Won	
1985	Best Instrumental Arrangement Accompanying Vocal(s)	"Hard Habit To Break" (Single)	David Foster & Jeremy Lubbock	Won	
1985	Best Vocal Arrangement for Two or More Voices	"Hard Habit To Break" (Track)	David Foster & Peter Cetera	Nominated	
1986	Album of the Year	We Are the World – USA For Africa/The Album	Chicago & all other album artists	Nominated	
2014	Grammy Hall of Fame	The Chicago Transit Authority		Inductee	
2020	Grammy Lifetime Achievement Award		Chicago	Honoree	

Billboard awards

- 1971: Top Album Artist
- 1971: Top Album Group
- 1971: Trendsetter Award (for setting concert records at Carnegie Hall)

Playboy awards

- 1971: All-Star Readers' Poll: Best Instrumental Combo, Playboy Jazz & Pop Poll
- 1971: Best Small-Combo LP: Chicago, Playboy Jazz & Pop Poll
- 1972: All-Star Readers' Poll: Best Instrumental Combo, Playboy Jazz & Pop Poll
- 1973: All-Star Musicians' Poll: Best Instrumental Combo, Playboy Jazz & Pop Poll
- 1973: All-Star Readers' Poll: Best Instrumental Combo, Playboy Jazz & Pop Poll
- 1973: Best Small-Combo LP: Chicago V, Playboy Jazz & Pop Poll

Other honors

- 1970: Best Album of 1970: Chicago, Cash Box
- 1976: City of Chicago Medal of Merit (city's highest civilian award)
- 1976: Awarded a Cartier 25-pound bar of pure platinum by Columbia Records for platinum album achievement.
- 1977: Madison Square Garden "Gold Ticket Award" for drawing over 100,000 people to the venue over the years. (Note: The seating capacity of Madison Square Garden is about 20,000.)
- 1987: American Video Award, Best Cinematography, "25 or 6 to 4" (Bobby Byrne)
- 1992: Hollywood Walk of Fame star for music contributions, located at 6400 Hollywood Boulevard
- 2016: Rock and Roll Hall of Fame induction (original members: Cetera, Kath, Lamm, Loughnane, Pankow, Parazaider, Seraphine)
- 2017: Songwriters Hall of Fame: James Pankow and Robert Lamm (inducted), Peter Cetera (elected, not inducted)

== See also ==
- Best selling music artists (worldwide)
