= All the Years =

"All The Years"

Song by Chicago

from the album Chicago XXXII: Stone of Sisyphus
- Released: June 17, 2008
- Recorded: 1993–1994
- Genre: Rock
- Length: 4:16
- Label: Rhino Records
- Songwriters: Robert Lamm and Bruce Gaitsch
- Producer: Peter Wolf

"All the Years" is a song that was recorded by the rock band Chicago, released on the 2008 album Stone of Sisyphus. It was written by Robert Lamm and studio session musician Bruce Gaitsch, the guitarist from the Night & Day Big Band album.

This is the third track on the 2008 release. It was supposed to be the opening track on the original 1994 release.

== Content ==
The song addresses the politics of the early nineties, when the album was recorded. It states how the politics haven't really changed from the late sixties, hence the line, "All the years we wasted, all the years we tried." This song was reminiscent of Lamm's earlier songwriting about politics and being outspoken.

=== Samples ===
"All the Years" features speeches by Martin Luther King Jr. and other activists from that time period playing in the background at various points of the song. It also includes audio of the protesters at the 1968 Democratic Convention shouting, "The Whole World's Watching." This is a gesture to Chicago's debut album, The Chicago Transit Authority, on the tenth track "Prologue, August 29, 1968."
