= Madison Square Garden Gold Ticket Award =

Award

In 1977 Madison Square Garden (MSG) announced Gold Ticket Awards would be given to performers who had brought in more than 100,000 unit ticket sales to the venue. Since the arena's seating capacity is about 20,000, this would require a minimum of five sold-out shows. To publicize the announcement, the first Gold Ticket Award was given to WNEW-FM, in recognition of the station's tenth anniversary, during intermission at the October 17, 1977 Emerson, Lake & Palmer concert at the venue. It was also announced that performers who had already hit the 100,000-plus mark would receive the award at future dates. Artists in that group included Chicago, John Denver, Peter Frampton, the Rolling Stones, The Jackson 5, Elton John, Led Zeppelin, Sly Stone, Jethro Tull, The Who, and Yes. Typically, artists received their awards during their appearances at Madison Square Garden. In a 2014 interview, Graeme Edge, drummer for the Moody Blues, said his gold ticket from Madison Square Garden was his "most interesting piece of memorabilia" from his career. He explained that what made it interesting is that the ticket can be used to attend any event at the Garden. He has never used it for that, mainly because he doesn't live close to the venue.

== MSG Platinum Ticket Awards ==
Madison Square Garden also gave Platinum Ticket Awards to performers who sold over 250,000 tickets to their shows throughout the years. Winners of the Platinum Ticket Awards include: the Rolling Stones (1981), Elton John (1982), Yes (1984), Billy Joel (1984), and The Grateful Dead (1987).

== Performers in the MSG Hall of Fame ==
Besides its Gold and Platinum Ticket Awards, Madison Square Garden has also recognized some performers by inducting them into the Madison Square Garden Hall of Fame. In the same October 1977 issue of Billboard magazine that reported MSG's announcement of the new Gold Ticket Award, for which he was eligible, Elton John was reported to be the first non-sports figure inducted into the MSG Hall of Fame for "record attendance of 140,000" in June of that year. For their achievement of "13 consecutive sell-out concerts" at the venue, the Rolling Stones were inducted into the MSG Hall of Fame in 1984, along with nine sports figures.

== 21st century: Performers awarded permanent banners ==
In the 21st century Madison Square Garden has honored sports figures and performing artists by raising permanent banners in the venue. In September 2022, Harry Styles became the third musical artist to have his banner raised in recognition of a run of 15 sold-out shows during his "Love on Tour 2022" residency.

== MSG Gold Ticket Awards of note ==
According to the American Society of Composers, Authors and Publishers (ASCAP), Earth, Wind & Fire were the "first black performers" to receive the MSG Gold Ticket Award. Billboard magazine, however, reported that both The Jackson 5 and Sly Stone were eligible as of October 17, 1977, when the award was first announced. The Jacksons received their award in 1981.

Billy Joel received the award after selling out Madison Square Garden for five nights in a row in 1980. In 2018 Joel played his 100th show at MSG, the record for most lifetime performances there.

The Grateful Dead were presented the award after selling out two MSG engagements in one year: the first was a two-night run in January 1979, and the second was a three-night stand in September. They had not played at MSG prior to the January engagement. Tickets for each show sold out the same day they went on sale.

Bruce Springsteen was the first performer who had participated in two different "events" that received the award: his own appearances at Madison Square Garden from 1978 into 1980, and his appearances in the "No Nukes" Concerts in September 1979. Phil Collins has also been a dual recipient of the award, in 1986 as a member of Genesis, and again in 1990 as a solo performer.

== List of MSG Gold Ticket Awardees to 1994 ==
MSG Gold Ticket Award
(An award for more than 100,000 ticket sales at Madison Square Garden over the years)
Artist	Year	Comment
WNEW-FM	1977	Honorary
Chicago	1977	By the time of this award Chicago had drawn over 180,000 people to the venue in nine sold-out appearances over the years.
Emerson, Lake & Palmer	1977	
Jethro Tull	1977	
John Denver	1978 (Eligible in 1977)	
Fania All-Stars	1978	
Yes	1978 (Eligible in 1977)	In 1984 Yes also was recognized with a Platinum Ticket Award for selling 250,000 tickets.
Bob Dylan	1978	
Richard Nader's Rock & Roll Spectacular	1978	
Queen	1978	
Rod Stewart	1979	By the time of his award, Stewart had sold over 200,000 tickets throughout the years.
Kiss	1979	
Peter Frampton	1979 (Eligible in 1977)	After a car accident in summer 1978, Frampton did not perform live again until 1979.
New York Salsa Festival	1979	Cash Box reported that this was the 14th award ever given. The award was presented to the show's producers, Ralph Mercado and Ray Aviles.
Grateful Dead	1979	Grateful Dead earned their award in one year's time for two shows in January 1979 and three shows in September 1979. In 1987 the band received the Garden's Platinum Ticket Award in recognition of selling over 250,000 tickets.
Bee Gees	1979	
The Who	1979 (Eligible in 1977)	
"No Nukes" Concerts	1979	
Earth, Wind & Fire	1979	
Isley Brothers	1980	According to Cash Box, the Isley Brothers received the first award of 1980, and the 20th over all.
Billy Joel	1980	Joel received the award after selling out Madison Square Garden for five nights in a row in 1980. Joel was also a Platinum Ticket Award recipient in 1984 for selling over 250,000 tickets.
Bruce Springsteen	1980	Springsteen was reported to be the 22nd recipient of the award, and the first performer to participate in two events which earned the award: for his own concerts from 1978 through 1980, and the September 1979 "No Nukes" Concerts.
The Moody Blues	1981	The Moody Blues first appearance at Madison Square Garden was in 1972.
The Jacksons	1981 (Eligible in 1977)	
Black Sabbath	1982	Black Sabbath gave its Gold Ticket Award to a Hard Rock Cafe in 1992.
David Bowie	1983	
Menudo	1985	
Aerosmith	1986	Billboard reported Aerosmith was the 27th act to receive the award since its inception in 1977.
Neil Diamond	1986	
Stevie Wonder	1986	
Genesis	1986	Received for ticket sales exceeding 200,000 for shows performed there since 1977.
Pink Floyd	1987	
Van Halen	1988	
New Edition	1989	
Paul McCartney	1989	
Bobby Brown	1989	
Phil Collins	1990	This was Phil Collins's second MSG Gold Ticket Award. He had received one in 1986 as a member of Genesis.
Fleetwood Mac	1990	
Luther Vandross	1991	
Rush	1991	
Madonna	1993	
Eric Clapton	1994	For tickets sold between the years 1974 - 1994.

== Others Eligible for MSG Gold Ticket (to 1994) ==
MSG Gold Ticket Award
Artist	Year	Comment
Elton John	Eligible in 1977	Elton John was inducted into the Madison Square Garden Hall of Fame on October 10, 1977, just weeks before the Gold Ticket Award was publicly introduced, for record attendance of over 140,000 at his June 1977 concerts. He was the first non-sports person to be inducted and the 94th over all. There is some evidence he received a Gold Ticket Award in 1982. In 1982 Elton John was also a recipient of the Platinum Ticket Award for selling over 250,000 tickets.
Led Zeppelin	Eligible in 1977	According to Ultimate Classic Rock, Led Zeppelin played their last U.S. concert on July 24, 1977, before the award was announced later that year in October. Performers typically received their Gold Ticket Awards during their appearances at Madison Square Garden after the October 1977 award announcement date.
The Rolling Stones	Eligible in 1977	The Rolling Stones received a MSG Platinum Ticket Award in 1981 for selling over 250,000 tickets. They were also inducted into the MSG Hall of Fame in 1984 in recognition for "13 consecutive sell-out concerts" at Madison Square Garden. They were one of ten inductees at the time, the other nine inductees were sports figures.
Sly Stone	Eligible in 1977	Sly and the Family Stone broke up in 1975, before the MSG Gold Ticket Award was established, and Sly Stone became more reclusive after the band's dissolution.
