= Maren Ord =

Canadian musician (born 1981)

- Born: Maren Whitney Ord; February 28, 1981 (age 45); Edmonton, Alberta, Canada
- Genres: Rock; pop
- Occupation: Singer-songwriter
- Years active: 1998–present

Maren Whitney Ord (born February 28, 1981) is a Canadian singer-songwriter of rock and pop music.

== Early life ==
Ord was born and grew up in Edmonton, Alberta, the eighth of ten children. She grew up in a musical family; her father was a professor of music, her mother taught voice and piano, and the family toured and performed as the Ord Family Singers. Maren sang, learned piano from her mother, and taught herself guitar at age 14.

At a 1998 audition for Lilith Fair, Ord met Canadian music impresario Terry McBride of the Vancouver-based record label and management company Nettwerk. She would be showcased at the music festival, and eventually take McBride as her manager.

In 1999, after her sister told her about a talent contest from Edmonton contemporary hit radio radio station Power 92, Maren entered four songs she had written that night, and two of them—"Eternity" and "Falling Slowly"—were recorded on the station's compilation CD, Power Picks Volume II.

== Career ==
=== The Nettwerk years and Waiting ===
Once signed with McBride and Nettwerk, Ord continued to perform and record and embarked on years of progressive promotion, including use of her songs on several episodes of the American television series Felicity and her performance of "Shining Time" with Neil Donell to the 2000 motion picture Thomas and the Magic Railroad. Her debut album, Waiting, was produced by Stephen Hague and recorded in London, England and New York City.

On November 7, 2000, Highway Records released a special edition of Waiting to a Christian, predominantly Mormon, bookstore market; this edition featured a bonus track that would not appear on the general public release. Nettwerk's record company released Waiting in Canada on February 20, 2001.

While Ord was nominated for a Juno Award for Best New Artist, and her singles "Sarah" and "Perfect" were successful on Canadian radio, an anticipated U.S. and international release with Capitol/EMI in summer 2001 did not come through, and Nettwerk itself, not a major record label outside of Canada, released Waiting quietly in the United States on August 27, 2002. The single "Perfect", in its entirety, plays over the closing credits, on is included on the soundtrack album, for the 2001 film Crazy/Beautiful.

=== Not Today ===
The EP Not Today was released on September 28, 2004, in Canada on the Maximum Music Group label in Canada. The EP included six songs mostly co-written with Randy Bachman.

=== Pretty Things and the acoustic direction ===
With the release of Pretty Things on November 21, 2006, Ord entered another phase of her career: an acoustic one. Pretty Things marked the beginning of Ord's production career as she co-produced the entire record herself at a studio in Orem, Utah. The sound is simpler, quieter and more reminiscent of Jack Johnson than Avril Lavigne (with whom she has been compared to previously). It saw a world-wide digital release through platforms like iTunes on October 10, 2006, and was met with mostly favourable reviews from her fans.

== Personal life ==
Ord currently resides in Alberta, with her husband Joe and five children.
