= Neil Donell =

Canadian singer

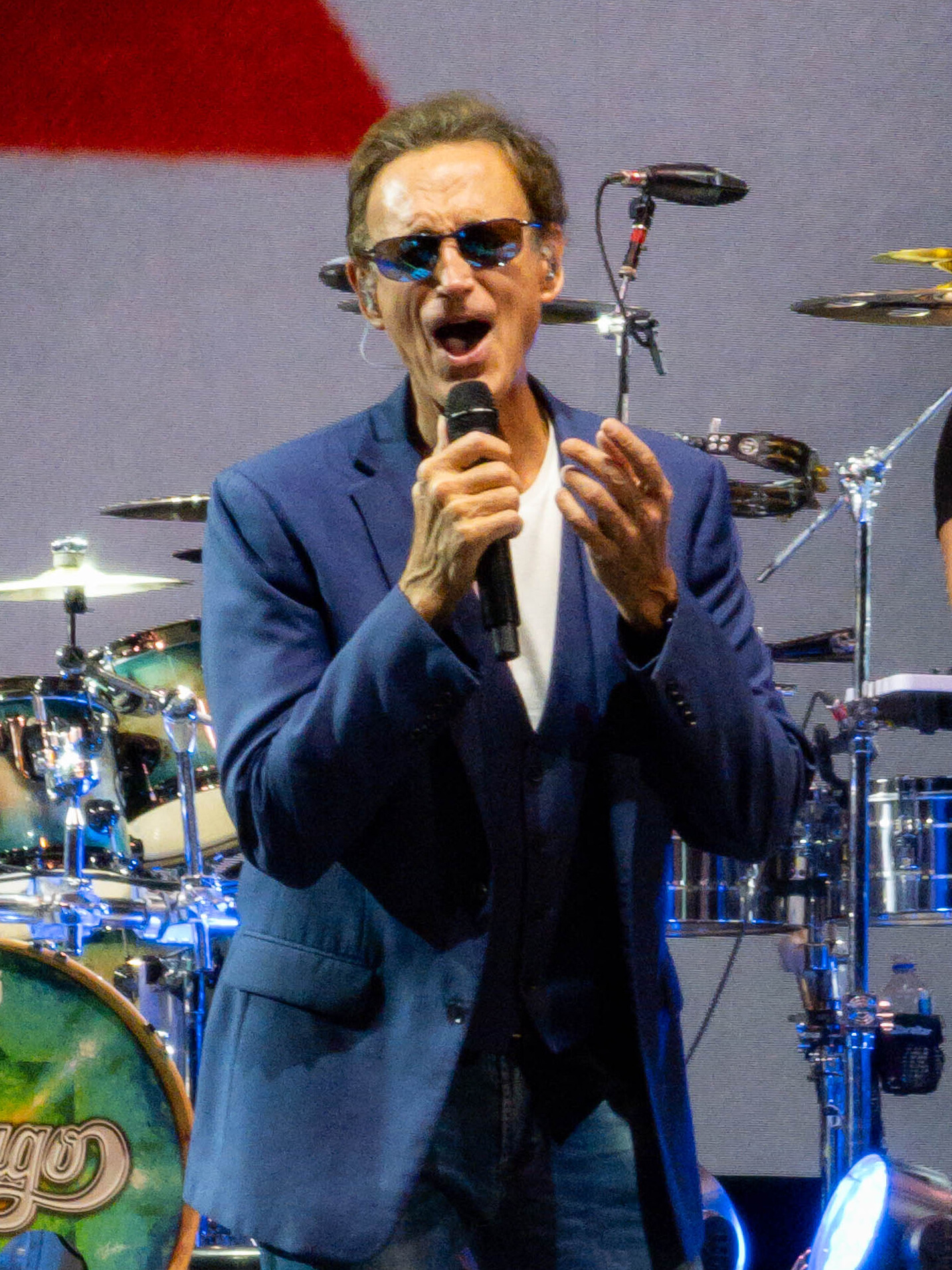
- Donell with Chicago in 2024

Background information
- Born: May 23, 1956 (age 70); Montreal, Quebec
- Origin: Toronto, Ontario
- Occupation: Musician
- Instruments: Vocals, guitar

Neil Donell (born May 23, 1956) is a Canadian singer who has worked extensively as a session musician and has been nominated for multiple Juno Awards. From 2018 to 2026, he was the lead tenor vocalist for the classic rock band Chicago, succeeding Peter Cetera, Jason Scheff and Jeff Coffey.

Possessing a wide vocal range, Donell has logged more than 10,000 sessions across his career and is one of the most recorded voices in Canadian music history. His credits also include a few small acting roles and performing "Shining Time" with Maren Ord, for the 2000 motion picture Thomas and the Magic Railroad. Donell performed a new rendition of the song for Rainbow Sun Productions' video presentation commemorating the film's 20th anniversary, which premiered on YouTube on July 19, 2020. He was also the lead performer and background vocalist for the songs in Super Why! such as the theme song, Super Readers to the Rescue, Hip Hip Hurray and among others.

Originally from Montreal, Quebec, Donell has been a resident of Toronto since the mid-1980s. He has two children.
