= Jeff Coffey =

American singer-songwriter and multi-instrumentalist

- Born: September 11, 1967 (age 59)
- Origin: Orlando, Florida
- Genres: Rock, jazz-rock, pop
- Instruments: Vocals, bass, guitar
- Years active: 1990–2011, 2014–present
- Labels: Smoke Tree Records, Jet Pack Label Group
- Member of: The Players, California Transit Authority
- Formerly of: Chicago, House of Dreams
- Website: Official website

Jeff Coffey (born September 11, 1967) is an American singer-songwriter and multi-instrumentalist. He is the bassist and backing vocalist for Don Felder. From 2016–18 he was bassist and co-lead vocalist for the band Chicago.

== Early career ==
Coffey grew up in Eustis, Florida in the Orlando area, and attended University of Central Florida where he traveled with their jazz band to perform at the Montreux Jazz Festival in Switzerland, and the North Sea Jazz Festival in The Hague. He spent much of the 1990s in the Gainesville, Florida-based band House of Dreams, which released a self-titled CD in 1994.

In 2007, Coffey released his second CD Long Way Home. From 2011–14, Coffey took a hiatus from music to focus on family and life. He returned to music on New Year's Eve 2014.

== Chicago ==
In Spring 2016, Coffey received a call from Chicago guitarist Keith Howland asking if he would be interested in auditioning to fill in for longtime bassist/vocalist Jason Scheff. Coffey auditioned and won the gig, making his debut on May 21, 2016, in Findlay, Ohio at a private event. His first public performance with Chicago was the following day, May 22, 2016, also in Findlay, Ohio.

Following Scheff's departure in October 2016, Coffey became an official member of the band. The announcement welcoming Coffey was made via Chicago's official Facebook page on October 25, 2016. Although joining the band after the production of their CNN documentary Now More than Ever, he was included in pre-broadcast interviews with the band featured on CNN in which he described the impact and legacy of Chicago's music. On January 19, 2018, Coffey announced his resignation from the band.

== Post-Chicago career ==
On February 27, 2018, Coffey released a new single titled "Got To Get Away". Jeff also announced via Facebook on April 15, 2018 that he would be touring as a bassist with Don Felder, formerly of The Eagles. Following his departure, Chicago and Rhino Records released 2 live CD/DVD combos, Chicago II: Live on Soundstage and Chicago: Greatest Hits Live, both recorded in November 2017 for the PBS show Soundstage and aired nationally over PBS stations in the summer of 2018. In early 2019, Coffey crowd-sourced funding for his new album of classic covers, "Origins: Singers and the Songs That Made Me" which will be released in late 2019 by Jetpack Label Group.

Ahead of its release, Coffey released music videos for "Back On My Feet Again" (recorded by The Babys) and "I Can't Make You Love Me" (originally by Bonnie Raitt) the latter which features Michael Omartian on production and piano. Also among the guest musicians include former Chicago bandmate Tris Imboden covering a Kenny Loggins song that Imboden performed on the original recording and Chris Rodriguez, a member of Peter Cetera's touring band prior to the latter's retirement from performing.

Currently, Coffey plays in the band known as the Players, alongside former Chicago bandmate Keith Howland. He also sings and plays bass in the California Transit Authority, a band founded by original Chicago drummer Danny Seraphine as a spin-off of the latter.

== Discography ==
- 1994: House of Dreams (with House of Dreams)
- 2003: Jeff Coffey
- 2007: Long Way Home
- 2018: Got To Get Away (Digital Single)
- 2018: Chicago II on Soundstage (With Chicago)
- 2018: Greatest Hits Live (With Chicago)
- 2019: Origins: Singers and the Songs That Made Me
- 2019: "I Can't Make You Love Me" (Digital Single) Jetpack Label Group
- 2021: This Time Around
