= Ray Herrmann =

American saxophonist

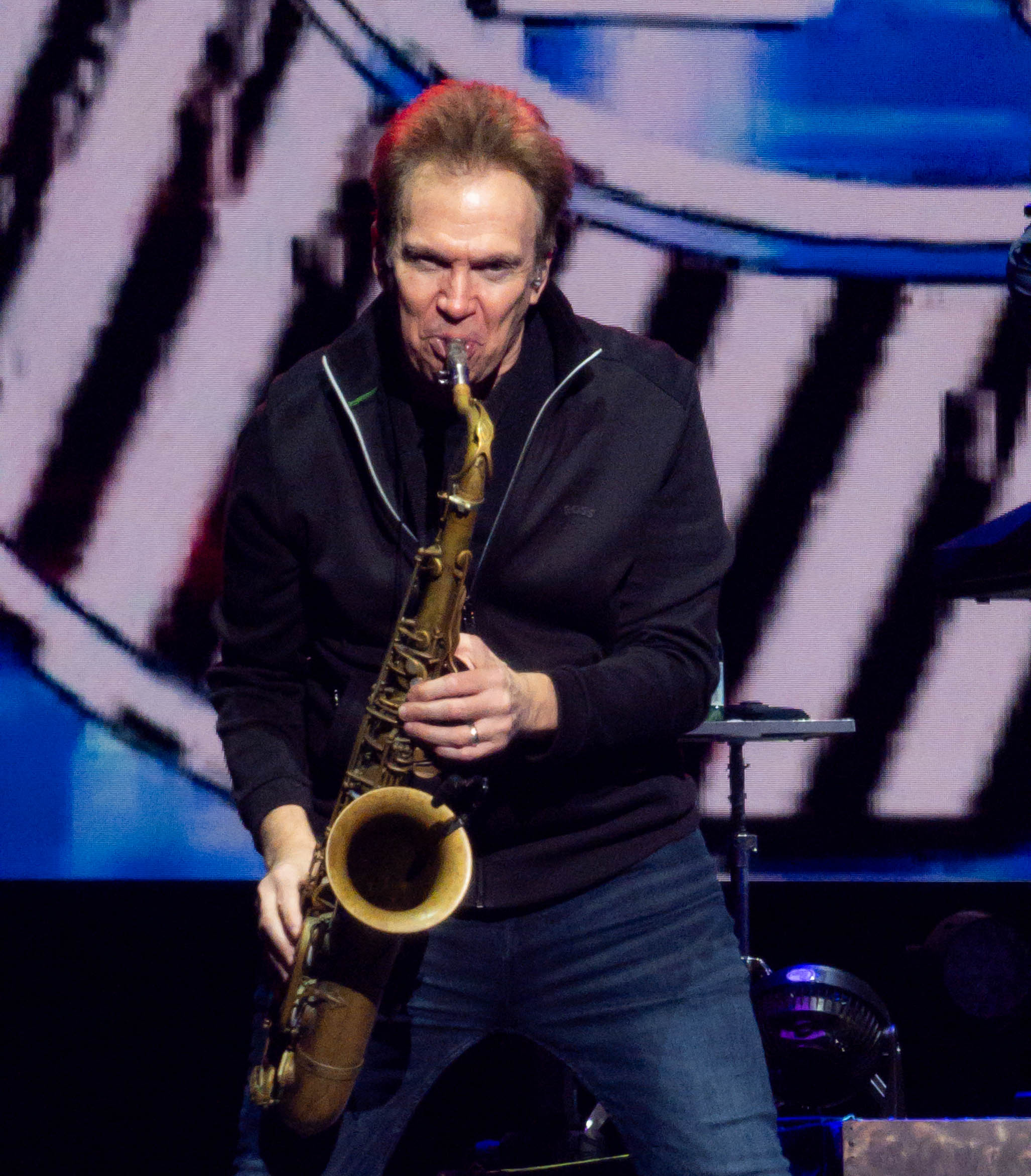
- Ray Herrmann on stage with Chicago, 2024

Background information
- Born: September 3, 1960 (age 65)
- Origin: Chicago, Illinois, US
- Genres: Rock; pop
- Occupations: Musician; composer; arranger
- Instruments: Saxophone; flute; clarinet
- Years active: 1979–present
- Labels: Little Lamb Music
- Member of: Chicago
- Website: www.rayherrmann.com

Ray Herrmann (born September 3, 1960) is an American saxophonist and flutist from Chicago, Illinois, United States. He is currently the saxophonist for the band Chicago since taking over for the retired original saxophonist/flutist and group founder, Walter Parazaider. Herrmann previously filled in for Parazaider for over a decade on numerous tours going back to 2005. He was promoted to an official member of Chicago in 2016.

Herrmann graduated from the University of North Texas. Before joining the band Chicago, Herrmann was a Los Angeles studio musician performing with Bob Dylan, Carlos Santana, and Johnny Hallyday. He is Catholic and takes his faith very seriously.
