= Keith Howland =

American guitarist (born 1964)

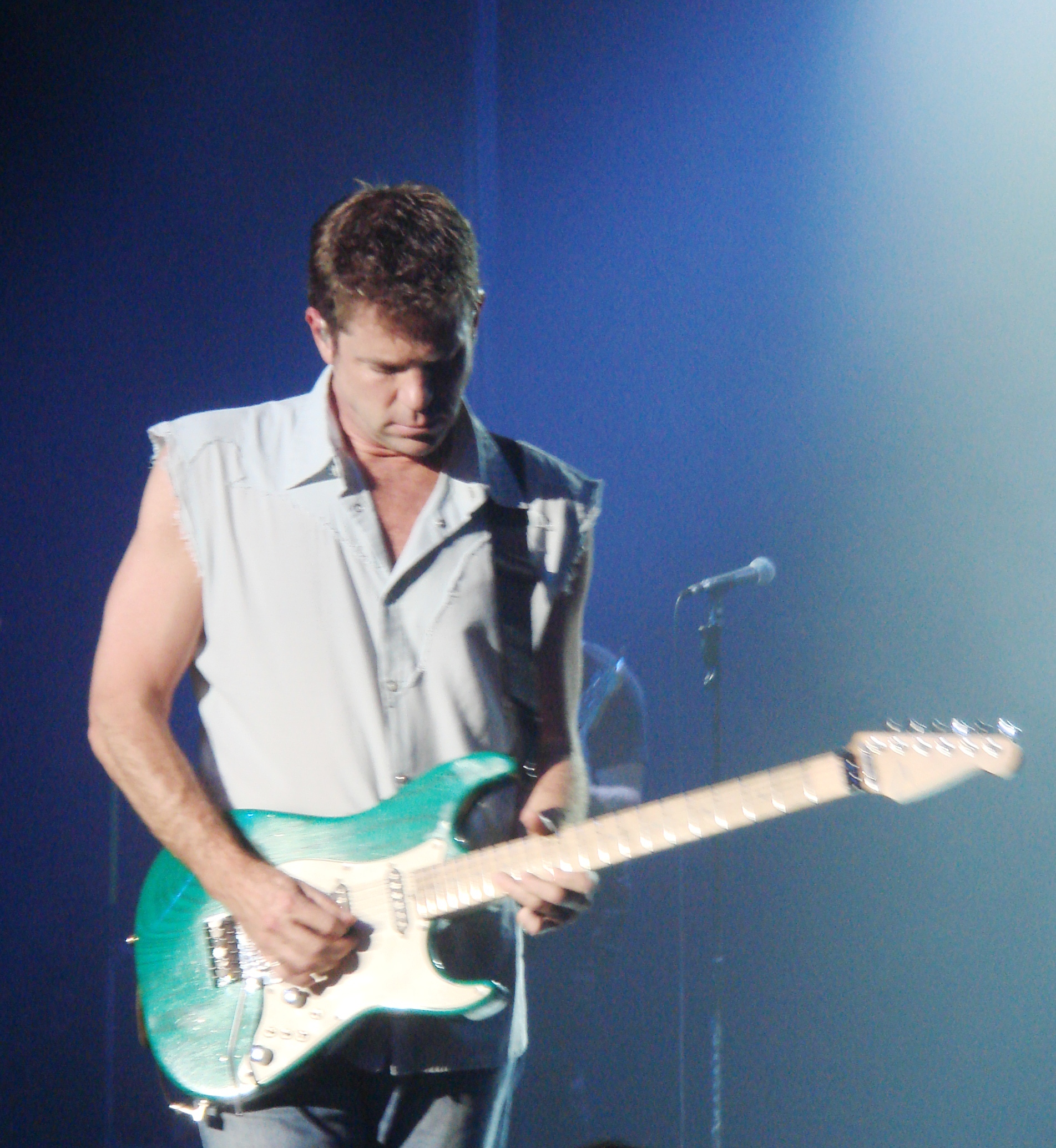
- Howland in 2008

Background information
- Born: August 14, 1964 (age 61); Silver Spring, Maryland, U.S.
- Genres: Pop, rock
- Occupation: Musician
- Instruments: Guitar, vocals
- Years active: 1986–present
- Formerly of: Chicago
- Website: keithhowland.com

Keith Howland (born August 14, 1964) is an American guitarist. He was the lead guitarist and occasional lead vocalist for the veteran pop-rock band Chicago from 1995 to 2021.

== Biography ==
Howland started playing the guitar at the age of seven, and he played in some bands during his school years. He attended elementary school in Richmond, Virginia, and graduated from James Madison University in 1986 with a degree in communications. In 1987, Keith moved to Los Angeles and took a job with Andy Brauer Studio Rentals, which helped him to make invaluable contacts in the music industry. He also continued playing as much as possible, including a 1993 summer tour with Rick Springfield.

In 1995, Chicago was looking for a new lead guitarist following the departure of Dawayne Bailey. Howland was a long-time fan of the band and of their co-founding guitarist, Terry Kath. Howland appeared uninvited at the auditions and attained a chance meeting with the band's bassist, Jason Scheff. He performed a last-minute audition and was offered the job on the same day.

Howland has also pursued projects outside the band, including projects he has done with Chicago's former drummer Tris Imboden. Their collaborative effort is known as The Howland/Imboden Project, releasing two albums. The sound can be described as all-instrumental, jazz/rock/fusion. The eponymous The Howland/Imboden Project is a studio album, and Live At The Baked Potato is a live recording.

In November 2007, Keith released an album titled KeCraig. This album started as a jam session in November 2007 with his brother Craig.

Howland collaborated with former Chicago keyboardist, guitarist, and vocalist Bill Champlin on Champlin's 2008 solo album No Place Left to Fall.

On November 15, 2021, Howland suffered a broken arm in an accident and took a leave of absence from the band. On December 1, 2021, Howland announced his resignation from Chicago after more than 26 years, citing lengthy recovery time before being able to resume playing guitar, and the desire to begin the next phase of his life.

Currently, Howland is a member of the supergroup known as The Players alongside fellow former Chicago bandmate and bassist/vocalist Jeff Coffey, keyboardist Rob Arthur, and drummer Ed Toth.
