= Chicago discography =

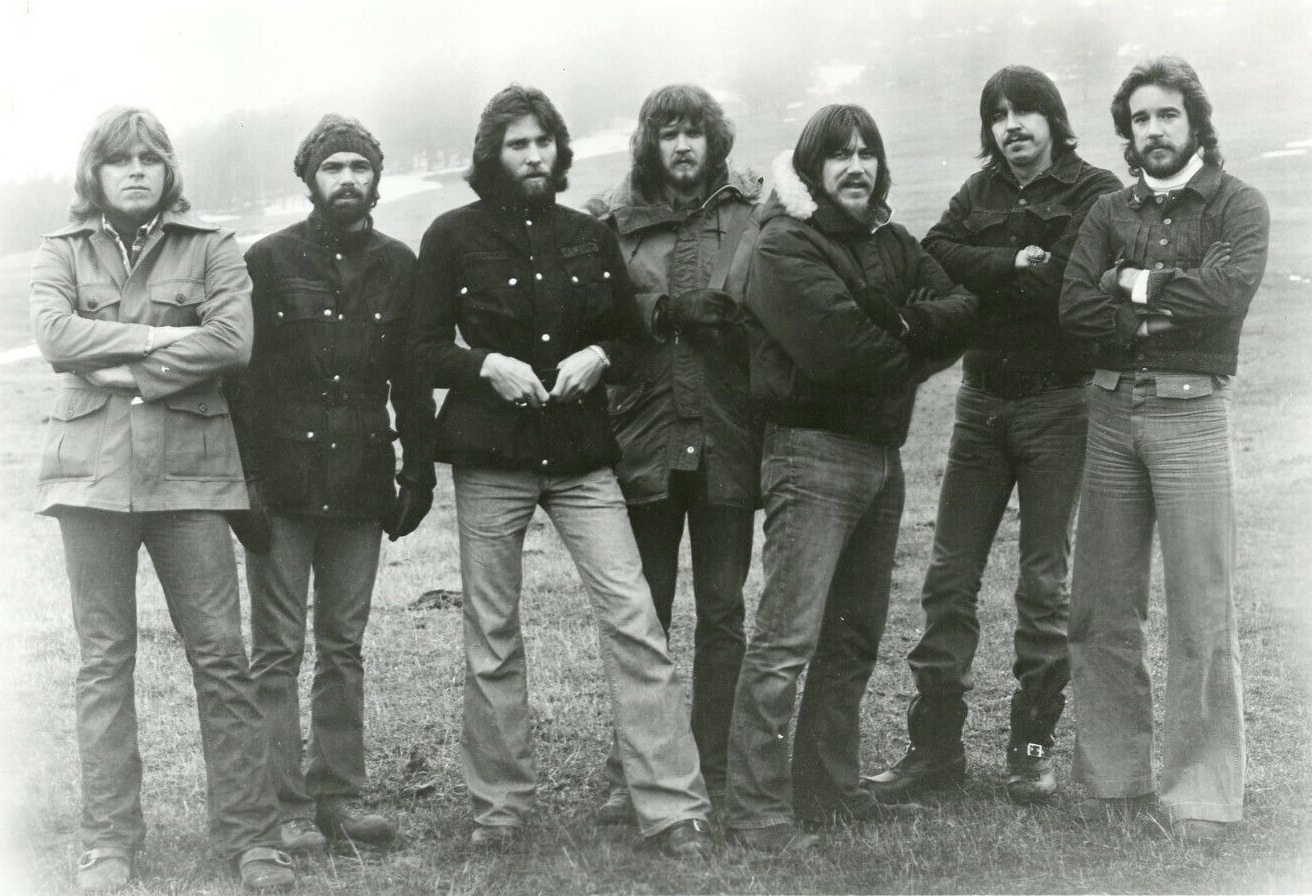
- Chicago in 1973 (L-R): Peter Cetera, Danny Seraphine, Robert Lamm, Lee Loughnane, Terry Kath, Walter Parazaider and James Pankow.
- Studio albums: 26
- Live albums: 7
- Compilation albums: 11
- Singles: 67

Chicago is an American rock band formed in 1967 in Chicago, Illinois. The self-described "rock and roll band with horns" began as a politically charged, sometimes experimental, rock band and later moved to a predominantly softer sound, generating several hit ballads. The group had a steady stream of hits throughout the 1970s and 1980s. Second only to the Beach Boys in Billboard singles and albums chart success among American bands, Chicago is one of the longest-running and most successful rock groups, and one of the world's best-selling groups of all time, having sold more than 100 million records.

Chicago has sold over 40 million units in the US, with 23 gold, 18 platinum, and 8 multi-platinum albums. Over the course of their career they have had five number-one albums and 21 top-ten singles. They were inducted into the Rock and Roll Hall of Fame on April 8, 2016, at Barclays Center in Brooklyn, New York.

== Albums ==
=== Canon albums ===
List of albums, with selected chart positions, sales figures and certifications
No.	Title	Album details	Peak chart positions												Certifications
No.	Title	Album details	US	AUS	CAN	FIN	FR (Note: The unreliable source was infodisc.fr.)	GER	ITA	NDL	NO	NZ	SWE	UK	Certifications
1	The Chicago Transit Authority	Released: April 28, 1969; Label: Columbia; Formats: LP, cassette, CD, 8-track; Cover design: Painted shingle	17	23	10	—	1	—	—	6	8	—	—	9	US: 2× Platinum; CAN: Platinum
2	Chicago	Released: January 26, 1970; Label: Columbia; Formats: LP, cassette, CD, 8-track; Cover design: Silver bar	4	5	4	—	13	20	8	2	—	—	7	6	US: Platinum; CAN: 3× Platinum
3	Chicago III	Released: January 11, 1971; Label: Columbia; Formats: LP, cassette, 8-track; Cover design: Tattered flag	2	6	7	6	—	17	9	5	8	—	5	9	US: Platinum; CAN: Gold
4	Chicago at Carnegie Hall	Released: October 25, 1971; Label: Columbia; Formats: LP, cassette, CD, 8-track; Cover design: White tile	3	26	3	—	—	—	—	—	—	—	—	—	US: Platinum; CAN: Gold
5	Chicago V	Released: July 10, 1972; Label: Columbia; Formats: LP, cassette, CD, 8-track; Cover design: Carved wood	1	5	1	14	—	—	13	4	7	—	5	24	US: 2× Platinum; CAN: Platinum
6	Chicago VI	Released: June 25, 1973; Label: Columbia; Formats: LP, cassette, CD, 8-track; Cover design: Engraved bill	1	12	2	26	—	—	22	—	13	—	3	—	US: 2× Platinum; CAN: Platinum
7	Chicago VII	Released: March 11, 1974; Label: Columbia; Formats: LP, cassette, CD, 8-track; Cover design: Embossed leather	1	13	4	—	—	—	—	—	13	—	18	—	US: Platinum; CAN: Gold
8	Chicago VIII	Released: March 24, 1975; Label: Columbia; Formats: LP, cassette, CD, 8-track; Cover design: Embroidered textile	1	27	3	—	17	—	—	—	6	30	25	—	US: Platinum; CAN: Gold
9	Chicago IX: Chicago's Greatest Hits	Released: November 10, 1975; Label: Columbia; Formats: LP, cassette, CD, 8-track; Cover design: Painted billboard	1	16	1	—	—	—	—	—	—	7	—	—	US: 5× Platinum; CAN: 3× Platinum
10	Chicago X	Released: June 14, 1976; Label: Columbia; Formats: LP, cassette, CD, 8-track; Cover design: Chocolate bar	3	3	3	—	—	5	8	4	7	6	6	21	US: 2× Platinum; CAN: Platinum; UK: Silver
11	Chicago XI	Released: September 12, 1977; Label: Columbia; Formats: LP, cassette, CD, 8-track; Cover design: Regional map	6	7	4	—	8	39	15	12	5	—	8	—	US: Platinum; CAN: Platinum
12	Hot Streets	Released: October 2, 1978; Label: Columbia; Formats: LP, cassette, CD, 8-track; Cover design: Photo of band	12	14	10	—	25	—	—	—	7	9	23	—	US: Platinum; CAN: Platinum
13	Chicago 13	Released: August 13, 1979; Label: Columbia; Formats: LP, cassette, CD, 8-track; Cover design: Marina City tower	21	24	21	—	—	—	—	—	16	—	30	—	US: Gold; CAN: Gold
14	Chicago XIV	Released: July 21, 1980; Label: Columbia; Formats: LP, cassette, CD, 8-track; Cover design: Fingerprint	71	71	60	—	—	—	—	—	—	—	46	—	
15	Greatest Hits, Volume II	Released: November 23, 1981; Label: Columbia; Formats: LP, cassette, CD, 8-track; Cover design: Series of signs	171	—	—	—	—	—	—	—	—	—	—	—	
16	Chicago 16	Released: June 7, 1982; Label: Full Moon; Formats: LP, cassette, CD, 8-track; Cover design: Computer chip	9	22	17	—	—	11	13	33	—	24	—	44	US: Platinum; CAN: Gold
17	Chicago 17	Released: May 14, 1984; Label: Full Moon; Formats: LP, cassette, CD, 8-track; Cover design: Brown paper package	4	65	4	—	23	12	—	20	14	25	1	24	US: 6× Platinum; UK: Gold
18	Chicago 18	Released: September 29, 1986; Label: Full Moon; Formats: LP, cassette, CD, 8-track; Cover design: Mosaic tiles	35	—	53	31	—	49	—	—	12	—	15	—	US: Gold
19	Chicago 19	Released: June 20, 1988; Label: Full Moon; Formats: LP, cassette, CD, 8-track; Cover design: Modern painting	37	—	38	39	—	42	—	—	5	—	7	—	US: Platinum
20	Greatest Hits 1982–1989 Issued as: The Heart of Chicago in Europe.	Released: November 21, 1989; Label: Full Moon; Formats: LP, cassette, CD; Cover design: Masonry	37	71	73	—	—	47	23	—	—	—	—	6	US: 5× Platinum; AUS: Gold; CAN: Gold; UK: Platinum
21	Twenty 1	Released: January 29, 1991; Label: Full Moon; Formats: LP, cassette, CD; Cover design: Painted number "1"	66	—	73	40	—	66	—	52	11	—	18	—	
22	Night & Day: Big Band	Released: May 23, 1995; Label: Giant; Formats: cassette, CD; Cover design: Musical instruments	90	—	—	—	—	—	—	—	—	—	—	—	
23	The Heart of Chicago 1967–1997	Released: April 22, 1997; Label: Reprise; Formats: cassette, CD; Cover design: Red satin	55	—	47	8	—	—	—	2	4	41	—	21	US: Gold; AUS: Gold
24	The Heart of Chicago 1967–1998 Volume II	Released: May 12, 1998; Label: Reprise; Formats: cassette, CD; Cover design: Blue satin	154	—	—	—	—	—	—	—	—	—	—	—	
25	Chicago XXV: The Christmas Album Reissued as: What's It Gonna Be, Santa? (2003).	Released: August 25, 1998; Label: Chicago; Formats: cassette, CD; Cover design: Christmas wreath	47	—	—	—	—	—	—	—	—	—	—	—	US: Gold
26	Chicago XXVI: Live in Concert	Released: October 12, 1999; Label: Chicago; Formats: CD; Cover design: Billboard on highway	—	—	—	—	—	—	—	—	—	—	—	—	
27	The Very Best of Chicago: Only the Beginning Issued as: The Chicago Story: Complete Greatest Hits in Europe.	Released: July 2, 2002; Label: Rhino; Formats: CD; Cover design: Green grass logo	20	86	—	—	—	25	—	4	—	—	—	11	US: 2× Platinum; AUS: Gold; UK: Gold
28	The Box	Released: July 22, 2003; Label: Rhino; Formats: CD; Cover design: Pushed out pins	—	—	—	—	—	—	—	—	—	—	—	—	
29	Love Songs	Released: January 25, 2005; Label: Rhino; Formats: CD, download; Cover design: Rose petals with box of chocolates & stemmed roses	57	—	—	—	—	—	—	—	—	—	5	—	
30	Chicago XXX	Released: March 21, 2006; Label: Rhino; Formats: CD, download; Cover design: Granite inlay on concrete with jackhammered XXX cutouts	41	—	—	—	—	—	—	—	—	—	—	—	
31	The Best of Chicago: 40th Anniversary Edition	Released: October 2, 2007; Label: Rhino; Formats: CD, download; Cover design: Red wax seal	100	—	—	—	—	—	—	—	—	—	—	—	US: Gold
32	Chicago XXXII: Stone of Sisyphus	Released: June 17, 2008; Label: Rhino; Formats: CD, download; Cover design: Chiseled out of stone boulder	122	—	—	—	—	—	—	—	—	—	—	—	
33	Chicago XXXIII: O Christmas Three	Released: October 4, 2011; Label: Chicago Records II; Formats: CD, download; Cover design: Candy cane	170	—	—	—	—	—	—	—	—	—	—	—	
34	Chicago XXXIV: Live in '75	Released: May 24, 2011; Label: Rhino; Formats: CD, download; Cover design: Sun and clouds special logo	—	—	—	—	—	—	—	—	—	—	—	—	
35	Chicago XXXV: The Nashville Sessions	Released: April 26, 2013; Label: Chicago Records II; Formats: CD, download; Cover design: Map with Nashville at top	—	—	—	—	—	—	—	—	—	—	—	—	
36	Chicago XXXVI: Now	Released: July 4, 2014; Label: Frontiers; Formats: CD, download; Cover design: Swirling black-and-white checkerboard	82	—	—	—	—	56	—	—	—	—	—	181	
37	Chicago XXXVII: Chicago Christmas	Released: October 11, 2019; Label: Rhino; Formats: LP, CD, download; Cover design: Green-and-white striped wrapped gift with red bow	—	—	—	—	—	—	—	—	—	—	—	—	
38	Chicago XXXVIII: Born for This Moment	Released: July 15, 2022; Label: BMG; Formats: LP, CD, download; Cover design: Brushed gold	—	—	—	—	—	—	—	—	—	—	—	—	
39	Chicago Greatest Christmas Hits	Released: November 3, 2023; Label: Rhino; Formats: LP, CD, download; Cover design: Ornaments and garland on tree	—	—	—	—	—	—	—	—	—	—	—	—	
40	Chicago at the John F. Kennedy Center for the Performing Arts, Washington D.C. (9/16/71)	Released: September 27, 2024; Label: Rhino; Formats: LP, CD, download; Cover design: Psychedelic pattern	—	—	—	—	—	—	—	—	—	—	—	—	

Notes:

- Studio albums
- Live albums
- Compilation albums
- Box sets

=== Other albums ===
Live albums

- 1972: Live in Japan
- 2015: Chicago at Symphony Hall
- 2018: Chicago: VI Decades Live (This is What We Do) (box set)
- 2018: Chicago: Chicago II Live on Soundstage
- 2018: Chicago: Greatest Hits Live
- 2018: Chicago: Live at the Isle of Wight Festival

Compilation albums

- 1983: If You Leave Me Now
- 1984: The Ultimate Collection
- 1985: Take Me Back to Chicago
- 1991: Group Portrait
- 1995: Overtime
- 1995: 25 Years of Gold – AUS #30
- 1996: The Very Best of Chicago
- 1997: Chicago Presents the Innovative Guitar of Terry Kath
- 2013: Chicago Collector's Edition (3 CD set from Madacy Records)
- 2016: Quadio
- 2025: Greatest Hits Expanded (Chicago IX)

== Unauthorized releases ==
In 1969, Chicago appeared at the Toronto Rock and Roll Revival, the same one day rock festival that produced John Lennon's Live Peace in Toronto 1969. (Also appearing at the festival were Alice Cooper, Bo Diddley and Chuck Berry - whose performances of the event were also issued on albums.) Since 1978, there have been innumerable unauthorized LP, Cassette and CD releases of the same poor-quality recording of this performance.

There were eight songs recorded at the gig, seven from Chicago Transit Authority plus the then-unreleased "25 or 6 to 4." Almost all of these releases include only seven of the songs; "Beginnings" is nearly always omitted, its title often being wrongly given to the first track "Introduction". "South California Purples" is often listed as "Purples", "Purple Song" or "South Carolina Purples", and sometimes given an incorrect writing credit—i.e., to composer Carl Michalski or "John Gunner/J.Marks".

The one song in the set not to appear previously on any official live album is "Liberation", which is frequently edited or faded early and whose correct total runtime is approximately 16:05. On some versions, all the songs are faded early. Some LP versions include talking between songs, most notably Lamm pointing out that "25 or 6 to 4" was a brand new song.

Despite its shortcomings, some reviewers have regarded the recording quite positively. For example, the 1984 LP release Chicago: Toronto Rock 'n' Roll Revival 69 by Design Records is considered by reviewer Doug Stone to be a "choice concert souvenir...captur(ing) the group in its live prime. Supporting the Chicago Transit Authority debut, before mastering wedding material, Chicago was a rock & roll force to be reckoned with." A reviewer of an earlier version of the same recording, entitled Toronto Rock 'n' Roll Revival 1969, Volume 1 (Accord, 1981) considers that "...there's certainly nothing wrong with the performance. In some ways, the at times fuzzy sound works in the album's favor, giving Chicago a garage-y edge rarely found on their studio works."

== Singles ==
Year	Title	US	US AC	AUS	UK	IRE	CAN	US CB	Certification	Lead singer	Album	B-side	Label and cat#
July 1969	"Questions 67 and 68"	71	—	—	—	—	54	82		Peter Cetera/Robert Lamm	Chicago Transit Authority	"Listen"	Columbia 44909
Oct. 1969	"Beginnings"	—	—	—	—	—	—	—		Lamm	Chicago Transit Authority	"Poem 58"	Columbia 45011
March 1970	"Make Me Smile"	9	—	33	—	—	11	11		Terry Kath	Chicago	"Colour My World"	Columbia 45127
June 1970	"25 or 6 to 4"	4	—	12	7	13	2	6		Cetera	Chicago	"Where Do We Go from Here"	Columbia 45194
Oct. 1970	"Does Anybody Really Know What Time It Is?"	7	5	35	—	—	2	5		Lamm	Chicago Transit Authority	"Listen"	Columbia 45264
Feb. 1971	"Free"	20	—	99	—	—	12	19		Kath	Chicago III	"Free Country"	Columbia 45331
April 1971	"Lowdown"	35	—	—	—	—	19	25		Cetera	Chicago III	"Loneliness Is Just a Word"	Columbia 45370
June 1971	"Beginnings" (A-side)	7	1	—	—	—	8	11		Lamm	Chicago Transit Authority		Columbia 45417
June 1971	"Colour My World" (B-side)	7	—	—	—	—	—	75		Kath	Chicago		Columbia 45417
Sept. 1971	"Questions 67 and 68" (A-side)	24	34	—	—	—	—	13		Cetera/Lamm	Chicago Transit Authority		Columbia 45467
Sept. 1971	"I'm a Man" (B-side)	49	—	—	8	13	8	67		Kath/Cetera/Lamm	Chicago Transit Authority		Columbia 45467
July 1972	"Saturday in the Park"	3	8	43	—	—	2	3	RIAA: Gold	Lamm/Cetera	Chicago V	"Alma Mater"	Columbia 45657
Oct. 1972	"Dialogue (Part I & II)"	24	—	91	—	—	26	17		Cetera/Kath	Chicago V	"Now That You've Gone"	Columbia 45717
June 1973	"Feelin' Stronger Every Day"	10	—	74	—	—	12	8		Cetera	Chicago VI	"Jenny"	Columbia 45880
Sept. 1973	"Just You 'n' Me"	4	7	23	—	—	3	1	RIAA: Gold	Cetera	Chicago VI	"Critic's Choice"	Columbia 45933
Feb. 1974	"(I've Been) Searchin' So Long"	9	8	44	—	—	5	7		Cetera	Chicago VII	"Byblos"	Columbia 46020
June 1974	"Call on Me"	6	1	—	—	—	9	10		Cetera	Chicago VII	"Prelude to Aire"	Columbia 46062
Oct. 1974	"Wishing You Were Here"	11	1	51	51 (Note: Chart position is from the official UK "Breakers List".)	—	12	9		Kath/Cetera	Chicago VII	"Life Saver"	Columbia 10049
Feb. 1975	"Harry Truman"	13	23	—	—	—	16	19		Lamm	Chicago VIII	"Till We Meet Again"	Columbia 10092
April 1975	"Old Days"	5	3	80	—	—	6	6		Cetera	Chicago VIII	"Hideaway"	Columbia 10131
Aug. 1975	"Brand New Love Affair (Part I and II)"	61	27	—	—	—	65	43		Kath/Cetera	Chicago VIII	"Hideaway"	Columbia 10200
June 1976	"Another Rainy Day in New York City"	32	2	—	—	—	37	33		Cetera	Chicago X	"Hope for Love"	Columbia 10360
July 1976	"If You Leave Me Now"	1	1	1	1	1	1	1	RIAA: Platinum	Cetera	Chicago X	"Together Again"	Columbia 10390
March 1977	"You Are on My Mind"	49	17	—	—	—	75	56		James Pankow	Chicago X	"Gently I'll Wake You"	Columbia 10523
Sept. 1977	"Baby, What a Big Surprise"	4	8	14	41	—	3	4		Cetera	Chicago XI	"Takin' It on Uptown"	Columbia 10620
Jan. 1978	"Little One"	44	40	—	—	—	49	59		Kath	Chicago XI	"Till the End of Time"	Columbia 10683
May 1978	"Take Me Back to Chicago"	63	39	—	—	—	66	62		Lamm/Chaka Khan	Chicago XI	"Policeman"	Columbia 10737
Oct. 1978	"Alive Again"	14	39	37	—	—	11	13		Cetera	Hot Streets	"Love Was New"	Columbia 10845
Dec. 1978	"No Tell Lover"	14	5	67	—	—	10	14		Cetera/Donnie Dacus	Hot Streets	"Take a Chance"	Columbia 10879
March 1979	"Gone Long Gone"	73	—	—	—	—	93	75		Cetera	Hot Streets	"The Greatest Love on Earth"	Columbia 10935
Aug. 1979	"Must Have Been Crazy"	83	—	—	—	—	—	84		Dacus	Chicago 13	"Closer to You"	Columbia 11061
Oct. 1979	"Street Player"*	—	—	—	—	—	—	—		Cetera	Chicago 13	"Window Dreamin'"	Columbia 11138
July 1980	"Thunder and Lightning"	56	46	—	—	—	—	67		Cetera/Lamm	Chicago XIV	"I'd Rather Be Rich"	Columbia 11345
Oct. 1980	"Song for You"	—	—	—	—	—	—	—		Cetera	Chicago XIV	"The American Dream"	Columbia 11376
May 1982	"Hard to Say I'm Sorry"	1	1	4	4	1	1	2	ARIA: Gold; RIAA: Gold	Cetera	Chicago 16	"Sonny Think Twice"	Full Moon/Warner 29979
Sept. 1982	"Love Me Tomorrow"	22	8	82	171	—	35	22		Cetera	Chicago 16	"Bad Advice"	Full Moon/Warner 29911
Jan. 1983	"What You're Missing"	81	—	—	—	—	—	—		Cetera	Chicago 16	"Rescue You"	Full Moon/Warner 29798
April 1984	"Stay the Night"	16	—	—	—	—	47	15		Cetera	Chicago 17	"Only You"	Full Moon/Warner 29306
July 1984	"Hard Habit to Break"	3	3	20	8	3	5	2		Cetera/Bill Champlin	Chicago 17	"Remember the Feeling"	Full Moon/Warner 29214
Nov. 1984	"You're the Inspiration"	3	1	43	14	9	5	4		Cetera	Chicago 17	"Once in a Lifetime"	Full Moon/Warner 29126
Feb. 1985	"Along Comes a Woman"	14	25	—	96	—	17	19		Cetera	Chicago 17	"We Can Stop the Hurtin'"	Full Moon/Warner 29082
Aug. 1986	"25 or 6 to 4" (Newly re-recorded version)	48	—	—	—	—	52	46		Jason Scheff	Chicago 18	"One More Day"	Full Moon/Warner 28628
Oct. 1986	"Will You Still Love Me?"	3	2	—	—	—	6	4		Scheff/Champlin	Chicago 18	"25 or 6 to 4" (Newly re-recorded version)	Full Moon/Warner 28512
March 1987	"If She Would Have Been Faithful..."	17	9	—	—	—	54	16		Scheff/Champlin	Chicago 18	"Forever"	Full Moon/Warner 28424
June 1987	"Niagara Falls"	91	—	—	—	—	—	—		Scheff/Champlin	Chicago 18	"I Believe"	Full Moon/Warner 28283
May 1988	"I Don't Wanna Live Without Your Love"	3	5	60	127	—	4	5		Champlin	Chicago 19	"I Stand Up"	Full Moon/ Reprise 27855
Sept. 1988	"Look Away"	1	1	—	77	—	1	1	RIAA: Gold	Champlin	Chicago 19	"Come in from the Night"	Full Moon/ Reprise 27766
Jan. 1989	"You're Not Alone"	10	9	—	—	—	22	9		Champlin	Chicago 19	"It's Alright"	Full Moon/ Reprise 27757
April 1989	"We Can Last Forever"	55	12	—	—	—	74	53		Scheff	Chicago 19	"One More Day"	Full Moon/ Reprise 22985
Nov. 1989	"What Kind of Man Would I Be?"	5	2	—	—	14	4	5		Scheff	Chicago 19/Greatest Hits 1982-1989	"25 or 6 to 4"	Full Moon/ Reprise 22741
July 1990	"Hearts in Trouble"	75	—	77	—	—	—	57		Champlin	Days of Thunder soundtrack	"Car Building"	DGC 19679
Jan. 1991	"Chasin' the Wind"	39	13	—	—	—	50	31		Champlin	Twenty 1	"Only Time Can Heal the Wounded"	Reprise 19466
Apr. 1991	"Explain It to My Heart"	—	—	—	—	—	—	107		Scheff/Champlin	Twenty 1	"God Save the Queen"	Reprise 19449
Jun. 1991	"You Come to My Senses"	—	11	—	—	—	57	—		Scheff	Twenty 1	"Who Do You Love"	Reprise 19205
Jun. 1995	"Dream a Little Dream of Me"	—	—	—	—	—	—	—		Scheff/Jade	Night & Day Big Band		Giant
April 1997	"Here in My Heart"	59*	1	—	—	—	—	—		Champlin/Scheff	The Heart of Chicago 1967–1997		Reprise
Oct. 1997	"The Only One"	—	17	—	—	—	—	—		Lamm/Champlin/Scheff/Lenny Kravitz	The Heart of Chicago 1967–1997		Reprise
June 1998	"All Roads Lead to You"	—	14	—	—	—	—	—		Champlin/Lamm/Scheff	The Heart of Chicago 1967–1998 Volume II		Reprise
Oct. 1998	"Show Me a Sign"	—	28	—	—	—	—	—		Scheff/Champlin	The Heart of Chicago 1967–1998 Volume II		Reprise
Sept. 1999	"Back to You"	—	—	—	—	—	—	—		Scheff	Chicago XXVI: Live in Concert		Chicago Records
Feb. 2006	"Feel"	—	19	—	—	—	—	—		Lamm	Chicago XXX		Rhino
May 2006	"Love Will Come Back" (featuring Rascal Flatts)	—	21	—	—	—	—	—		Scheff/Rascal Flatts members/Champlin	Chicago XXX		Rhino
June 2008	"Let's Take a Lifetime"	—	—	—	—	—	—	—		Scheff	Chicago XXXII: Stone of Sisyphus		Rhino
Dec. 2011	"My Favorite Things"	—	9	—	—	—	—	—		Lamm	Chicago XXXIII: O Christmas Three		Chicago Records II
Nov. 2019	"All Over the World"	—	28	—	—	—	—	—		Neil Donell	Chicago Christmas (2019)		Rhino
Dec. 2019	"Sleigh Ride 2019"	—	15	—	—	—	—	—		Donell	Chicago Christmas (2019)		Rhino
May 2022	"If This Is Goodbye"	—	16	—	—	—	—	—		Donell/Lamm	Chicago XXXVIII: Born For This Moment		BMG

- "Street Player" peaked at #91 on the US R&B chart in December 1979.
- The #59 peak of "Here in My Heart" was on the Hot 100 Airplay chart. The record was not eligible for the Hot 100 at the time, not being released as a retail single.

=== Billboard and Cash Box year-end performances ===
Year	Song	BB Year-End Position	CB Year-End Position
1970	"Make Me Smile"	59	60
1970	"25 or 6 to 4"	61	—
1971	"Beginnings" / "Colour My World"	56	58
1972	"Saturday in the Park"	76	71
1973	"Feelin' Stronger Every Day"	54	82
1973	"Just You 'N' Me"	—	62 (1973) 60 (1974)
1974	"(I've Been) Searchin' So Long"	73	65
1974	"Call On Me"	98	—
1976	"If You Leave Me Now"	48	14
1982	"Hard to Say I'm Sorry"	10	11
1984	"Hard Habit to Break"	45	32
1985	"You're the Inspiration"	37	35
1987	"Will You Still Love Me?"	50	23
1988	"I Don't Wanna Live Without Your Love"	48	40
1989	"Look Away"	1	—
1990	"What Kind of Man Would I Be?"	71	—

== Other appearances ==
Year	Song	Album
1985	"Good for Nothing"	We Are the World

== Videos ==
=== Music videos ===
List of music videos, with directors, showing year released
Year	Video	Director
1976	"If You Leave Me Now" (Live)	
1978	"Alive Again" (Live)	
1982	"Hard To Say I'm Sorry"	
1982	"Love Me Tomorrow"	
1984	"Stay the Night"	Gilbert Bettman Jr.
1984	"Hard Habit to Break"	Leslie Libman
1984	"You're the Inspiration"	Leslie Libman
1985	"Along Comes a Woman"	Jay Dubin
1986	"25 or 6 to 4"	Andy Brenton
1986	"Will You Still Love Me?"	
1988	"I Don't Wanna Live Without Your Love"	Paul Boyington
1988	"Look Away"	
1989	"You're Not Alone"	Richard Levine
1990	"Hearts in Trouble"	Michael Bay
1991	"Chasin' the Wind"	
1991	"Explain It to My Heart"	
2006	"Feel"	
2014	"Now"	
2014	"More Will Be Revealed"	
2022	"If This is Goodbye"	
