= The Very Best of Chicago: Only the Beginning =

- US CD cover art

Greatest hits album by Chicago
- Released: July 2, 2002
- Recorded: January 1969 – January 1995
- Genre: Rock; jazz fusion; adult contemporary; soft rock; pop rock
- Length: 157:44
- Label: Rhino
- Producer: James William Guercio, Phil Ramone, Chicago, David Foster, Chas Sandford, Ron Nevison, Bruce Fairbairn, David McLees

Chicago chronology
Chicago XXVI: Live in Concert (1999)	The Very Best of Chicago: Only the Beginning (2002)	The Box (2003)

Alternative cover
- Europe, Australia CD cover art

Professional ratings
Review scores
Source	Rating
AllMusic	4.5/5 stars

The Very Best of Chicago: Only the Beginning is the sixth greatest hits album by the American band Chicago, their twenty-seventh album overall. Released in 2002, this collection marked the beginning of a long-term partnership with Rhino Entertainment which, between 2002 and 2005, would remaster and re-release Chicago's 1969–1980 Columbia Records catalog.

In Europe, a greatest hits compilation was released as The Chicago Story: Complete Greatest Hits with a different track listing.

The Very Best of Chicago: Only the Beginning combines almost all of Chicago's greatest successes from their entire recording career up to that point, excerpting material from all of their regular studio albums with the exception of 1979's Chicago 13 and 1980's Chicago XIV. Several songs appear in an edited form, including "I'm a Man", which is missing the Danny Seraphine drum solo, and "Dialogue (Part I & II)", which is presented in its shortened single version. There is a new edit of “Make Me Smile”—which bridges the namesake part and the “Now More Than Ever” part of the “Ballet for a Girl in Buchannon” together as in the original single, but without omitting the full intro or guitar solo of the former or the full outro of the latter,—and a new version of “Does Anybody Really Know What Time It Is?”—which is a stereo version of the original single, including all but the free-form piano intro.

== Track listing ==
=== Disc 1 ===
1. "Make Me Smile" (James Pankow) – 4:26 (From the album Chicago)
  - New edit
2. "25 or 6 to 4" (Robert Lamm) – 4:50 (From the album Chicago)
3. "Does Anybody Really Know What Time It Is?" (Lamm) – 3:20 (From the album Chicago Transit Authority)
  - New edit
4. "Beginnings" (Lamm) – 6:26 (From the album Chicago Transit Authority)
  - Greatest Hits edit
5. "Questions 67 and 68" (Lamm) – 4:52 (From the album Chicago Transit Authority)
  - Edit
6. "I'm a Man" (Jimmy Miller, Steve Winwood) – 5:44 (From the album Chicago Transit Authority)
  - New edit
7. "Colour My World" (Pankow) – 3:00 (From the album Chicago)
8. "Free" (Lamm) – 2:17 (From the album Chicago III)
9. "Lowdown" (Peter Cetera, Danny Seraphine) – 3:34 (From the album Chicago III)
10. "Saturday in the Park" (Lamm) – 3:56 (From the album Chicago V)
11. "Dialogue (Part I & II)" (Lamm) – 5:00 (From the album Chicago V)
  - Single version
12. "Just You 'n' Me" (Pankow) – 3:42 (From the album Chicago VI)
13. "Feelin' Stronger Every Day" (Cetera, Pankow) – 4:14 (From the album Chicago VI)
14. "(I've Been) Searchin' So Long" (Pankow) – 4:29 (From the album Chicago VII)
15. "Wishing You Were Here" (Cetera) – 4:36 (From the album Chicago VII)
16. "Call on Me" (Lee Loughnane) – 4:02 (From the album Chicago VII)
17. "Happy Man" (Cetera) – 3:15 (From the album Chicago VII)
  - Greatest Hits 2 edit
18. "Another Rainy Day in New York City" (Lamm) – 3:00 (From the album Chicago X)
19. "If You Leave Me Now" (Cetera) – 3:57 (From the album Chicago X)

Disc 1 length: 75:20

=== Disc 2 ===
1. "Old Days" (Pankow) – 3:31 (From the album Chicago VIII)
2. "Baby, What a Big Surprise" (Cetera) – 3:06 (From the album Chicago XI)
3. "Take Me Back to Chicago" (Seraphine, David Wolinski) – 2:57 (From the album Chicago XI)
  - Single version
4. "Alive Again" (Pankow) – 4:04 (From the album Hot Streets)
5. "No Tell Lover" (Cetera, Loughnane, Seraphine) – 4:13 (From the album Hot Streets)
6. "Love Me Tomorrow" (Cetera, David Foster) – 3:58 (From the album Chicago 16)
  - Single version
7. "Hard to Say I'm Sorry/Get Away" (Cetera, Foster, Lamm) – 5:05 (From the album Chicago 16)
8. "Stay the Night" (Cetera, Foster) – 3:50 (From the album Chicago 17)
9. "Hard Habit to Break" (Steve Kipner, John Parker) – 4:45 (From the album Chicago 17)
10. "You're the Inspiration" (Cetera, Foster) – 3:49 (From the album Chicago 17)
11. "Along Comes a Woman" (Cetera, Mark Goldenberg) – 3:47 (From the album Chicago 17)
  - Single version
12. "Will You Still Love Me?" (David Foster, Tom Keane, Richard Baskin) – 4:12 (From the album Chicago 18)
  - Single version
13. "If She Would Have Been Faithful..." (Randy Goodrum, Kipner) – 3:51 (From the album Chicago 18)
14. "Look Away" (Diane Warren) – 4:00 (From the album Chicago 19)
  - Single version
15. "What Kind of Man Would I Be?" (Jason Scheff, Bobby Caldwell, Chas Sandford) – 4:14 (From the album Chicago 19)
  - Single version
16. "I Don't Wanna Live Without Your Love" (Warren, Albert Hammond) – 3:57 (From the album Chicago 19)
17. "We Can Last Forever" (Scheff, John Dexter) – 3:44 (From the album Chicago 19)
18. "You're Not Alone" (Jim Scott) – 4:00 (From the album Chicago 19)
  - Single version
19. "Chasin' the Wind" (Warren) – 4:18 (From the album Twenty 1)
20. "Sing, Sing, Sing" – with the Gipsy Kings (Louis Prima) – 3:20 (From the album Night and Day: Big Band)

Disc 2 total length: 75:21

== Track listing (Europe and Australia) ==
=== Disc 1 ===
1. "If You Leave Me Now" (Cetera) – 3:57
2. "Hard to Say I'm Sorry" (Cetera, Foster, Lamm) – 3:51
  - Single version
3. "You're the Inspiration" (Cetera, Foster) – 3:49
4. "Hard Habit to Break" (Kipner, Parker) – 4:45
5. "Will You Still Love Me?" (Foster, Keane, Baskin) – 4:12
  - Single version
6. "Baby, What a Big Surprise" (Cetera) – 3:06
7. "Look Away" (Warren) – 4:00
  - Single version
8. "What Kind of Man Would I Be?" (Scheff, Caldwell, Sandford) – 4:14
  - Single version
9. "I Don't Wanna Live Without Your Love" (Warren, Hammond) – 3:57
10. "Love Me Tomorrow" (Cetera, Foster) – 3:58
  - Single version
11. "Just You 'n' Me" (Pankow) – 3:42
12. "Happy Man" (Cetera) – 3:15
  - Same edit as American issue
13. "You're Not Alone" (Scott) – 4:00
  - Single version
14. "Chasin' the Wind" (Warren) – 4:18
15. "Wishing You Were Here" (Cetera) – 4:36
16. "No Tell Lover" (Cetera, Loughnane, Seraphine) – 4:13
17. "(I've Been) Searchin' So Long" (Pankow) – 4:29
18. "Colour My World" (Pankow) – 3:00
19. "You Come to My Senses" (Tom Kelly, Billy Steinberg) – 3:48 (From the album Twenty 1)
20. "We Can Last Forever" (Scheff, Dexter) – 3:44

=== Disc 2 ===
1. "25 or 6 to 4" (Lamm) – 4:50
2. "Saturday in the Park" (Lamm) – 3:56
3. "Questions 67 and 68" (Lamm) – 4:52
  - Same edit as American issue
4. "I'm a Man" (Miller, Winwood) – 5:44
  - Same edit as American issue
5. "Stay the Night" (Cetera, Foster) – 3:50
6. "Only You" (Foster, Pankow) – 3:54
  - Originally issued on Chicago 17
7. "Dialogue (Part I & II)" (Lamm) – 5:00
  - Single version
8. "Old Days" (Pankow) – 3:31
9. "Beginnings" (Lamm) – 6:26
  - Same edit as American issue
10. "Lowdown" (Cetera, Seraphine) – 3:34
11. "Another Rainy Day in New York City" (Lamm) – 3:00
12. "Call on Me" (Loughnane) – 4:02
13. "Feelin' Stronger Every Day" (Cetera, Pankow) – 4:14
14. "Take Me Back to Chicago" (Seraphine, Wolinski) – 2:57
  - Single version
15. "Sing, Sing, Sing" – with the Gipsy Kings (Prima) – 3:20
16. "Along Comes a Woman" (Cetera, Goldenberg) – 3:47
  - Single version
17. "Does Anybody Really Know What Time It Is?" (Lamm) – 3:20
  - Single version
18. "Make Me Smile" (Pankow) – 4:26
  - Same edit as American issue
19. "Street Player" (Seraphine, Wolinski) – 4:22 (From the album Chicago 13)
  - Single version

== Personnel ==
=== Musicians ===
- Dawayne Bailey – guitar, vocals
- Peter Cetera – vocals, bass; guitar on "Wishing You Were Here"
- Bill Champlin – vocals, keyboards, guitar
- Donnie Dacus – guitar, vocals on "Alive Again" and "No Tell Lover"
- Bruce Gaitsch – guitar on "Sing, Sing, Sing"
- Tris Imboden – drums on "Sing, Sing, Sing"
- Terry Kath – vocals, guitar, percussion; bass on "Happy Man" and "Wishing You Were Here"
- Robert Lamm – vocals, keyboards, percussion
- Lee Loughnane – trumpet, flugelhorn, percussion, vocals
- Laudir de Oliveira – congas, percussion, vocals
- James Pankow – trombone, percussion, vocals, arrangements
- Walter Parazaider – woodwinds, percussion, vocals
- Chris Pinnick – guitar
- Jason Scheff – vocals, bass
- Danny Seraphine – drums, percussion, vocals

=== Production ===
- Chicago – production on "Alive Again" and "No Tell Lover", compilation production
- David Donnelly – remastering
- Bruce Fairbairn – production on "Sing, Sing, Sing"
- David Foster – production from Chicago 16 to Chicago 18
- James William Guercio – production from The Chicago Transit Authority to Chicago XI
- Lee Loughnane – remastering
- Jeff Magid – remastering
- David McLees – compilation production
- Ron Nevison – production from Chicago 19 to Twenty 1
- Phil Ramone – production on "Alive Again" and "No Tell Lover"
- Chas Sandford – production on "What Kind of Man Would I Be?"

== Charts ==
Chart (2002–2003)	Peak position
Australian Albums (ARIA)	86
Austrian Albums (Ö3 Austria)	4
Danish Albums (Hitlisten)	12
Dutch Albums (Album Top 100)	77
European Albums Chart	20
Finnish Albums (Suomen virallinen lista)	32
German Albums (Offizielle Top 100)	25
Irish Albums (IRMA)	6
Japanese Albums (Oricon)	62
Norwegian Albums (VG-lista)	4
Scottish Albums (OCC)	15
Singaporean Albums (RIAS)	3
Swedish Albums (Sverigetopplistan)	1
Swiss Albums (Schweizer Hitparade)	29
UK Albums (OCC)	11
US Billboard 200	38

Chart (2007)	Peak position
Spanish Albums (Promusicae)	92

== Certifications ==
Region	Certification	Certified units/sales
Australia (ARIA)	Gold	35,000^{^}
Brazil (Pro-Música Brasil)	Gold	50,000^{*}
Germany (BVMI)	Gold	150,000^{^}
United Kingdom (BPI)	Gold	100,000^{^}
United States (RIAA)	2× Platinum	2,000,000^{^}
^{*} Sales figures based on certification alone.^{^} Shipments figures based on certification alone.

== Release history ==
Title	Region	Date	Label	Format	Catalog
The Very Best Of: Only the Beginning	United States	July 2, 2002	Rhino Entertainment	double CD	R2 76170
The Chicago Story: Complete Greatest Hits	United Kingdom	September 2002	Rhino Entertainment	double CD	8122736302
The Chicago Story: Complete Greatest Hits	Australia	October 2002	Warner Music Australasia	double CD	8122736062
