= Chicago IX: Chicago's Greatest Hits =

Compilation album by Chicago
- Released: November 10, 1975
- Recorded: January 1969 – December 1973
- Genres: Progressive rock; jazz fusion
- Length: 47:18
- Label: Columbia
- Producer: James William Guercio

Chicago chronology
Chicago VIII (1975)	Chicago IX: Chicago's Greatest Hits (1975)	Chicago X (1976)

Professional ratings
Review scores
Source	Rating
AllMusic	4.5/5 stars

Chicago IX: Chicago's Greatest Hits is the first greatest hits album, and ninth album overall, by the American band Chicago and was released in 1975 by Columbia Records in both stereo (PC 33900) and SQ quadraphonic (PCQ 33900) versions.

Including all of Chicago's biggest hits to date, this set stretches from their 1969 debut, Chicago Transit Authority (referred to as Chicago I in the original LP liner notes), to 1974's Chicago VII. Chicago VIII and its hits, having only come out just months earlier, were considered too recent to anthologize, while Chicago III's material was overlooked for inclusion due to its lack of top-selling singles.

Chicago IX proved to be an enormous success upon its release. It reached No. 1 in the US (the fifth and final consecutive Chicago album to do so) and remained on the Billboard 200 for a total of 72 weeks. It has since been certified quintuple platinum by the RIAA, signifying sales of over five million copies. Chicago IX was reissued by Rhino Records, Chicago's current distributor. The album did not chart in the UK.

== Track listing ==
Side one
No.	Title	Writer(s)	Original album	Length
1.	"25 or 6 to 4"	Robert Lamm	Chicago (1970)	4:51
2.	"Does Anybody Really Know What Time It Is?"	Lamm	Chicago Transit Authority (1969)	2:53 (Note: The original LP and cassette versions of the album use the mono promo single, cutting off most of the intro and omitting the spoken part over the last verse. The song is 3:20 on CD versions of the album.)
3.	"Colour My World"	James Pankow	Chicago	2:59
4.	"Just You 'n' Me"	Pankow	Chicago VI (1973)	3:42
5.	"Saturday in the Park"	Lamm	Chicago V (1972)	3:54
6.	"Feelin' Stronger Every Day"	Peter Cetera; Pankow	Chicago VI	4:14

Side two
No.	Title	Writer(s)	Original album	Length
1.	"Make Me Smile (Note: Single edit that includes parts of "Now More Than Ever".)"	Pankow	Chicago	2:59
2.	"Wishing You Were Here"	Cetera	Chicago VII (1974)	4:34
3.	"Call on Me"	Lee Loughnane	Chicago VII	4:02
4.	"(I've Been) Searchin' So Long"	Pankow	Chicago VII	4:29
5.	"Beginnings"	Lamm	Chicago Transit Authority	6:28 (Note: The original LP and cassette versions fade out about 1:20 early. The song is 7:51 on CD versions of the album.)

The UK version contains the additions of "Never Been in Love Before" and a shortened 3:27 version of "I'm a Man". The Brazilian version has the addition of "Happy Man" and moves "25 or 6 to 4" to the end of Side 1. "Feelin' Stronger Every Day" and "(I've Been) Searchin' So Long" are omitted.

=== 2025 expanded version ===
To commemorate the 50th anniversary of the original album's release, an expanded version of the album featuring 10 additional tracks was released in 2025. The new edition includes songs from every studio album they released between 1969 and 1980.

No.	Title	Writer(s)	Original album	Length
1.	"Questions 67 and 68"	Robert Lamm	Chicago Transit Authority (1969)	3:25
2.	"Beginnings"	Lamm	Chicago Transit Authority	2:51
3.	"Make Me Smile" (2017 Steven Wilson Remix/Edit)	James Pankow	Chicago (1970)	2:58
4.	"25 or 6 to 4" (2017 Steven Wilson Remix/Edit)	Lamm	Chicago	2:55
5.	"Does Anybody Really Know What Time It Is?"	Lamm	Chicago Transit Authority	2:45
6.	"Free"	Lamm	Chicago III (1971)	2:19
7.	"Colour My World" (2017 Steven Wilson Remix)	Pankow	Chicago	3:00
8.	"Saturday in the Park"	Lamm	Chicago V (1972)	3:56
9.	"Dialogue (Part I & II)"	Lamm	Chicago V	5:04
10.	"Feelin' Stronger Every Day"	Peter Cetera; Pankow	Chicago VI (1973)	4:16
11.	"Just You 'n' Me"	Pankow	Chicago VI	3:45
12.	"(I've Been) Searchin' So Long"	Pankow	Chicago VII (1974)	4:20
13.	"Call on Me"	Lee Loughnane	Chicago VII	4:04
14.	"Wishing You Were Here"	Cetera	Chicago VII	3:00
15.	"Old Days"	Pankow	Chicago VIII (1975)	3:32
16.	"If You Leave Me Now"	Cetera	Chicago X (1976)	3:58
17.	"Baby, What a Big Surprise"	Cetera	Chicago XI (1977)	3:08
18.	"Alive Again"	Pankow	Hot Streets (1978)	3:31
19.	"No Tell Lover"	Loughnane; Danny Seraphine; Cetera	Hot Streets	3:50
20.	"Street Player"	Seraphine; David Wolinski	Chicago 13 (1979)	4:22
21.	"Thunder and Lightning"	Lamm; Seraphine	Chicago XIV (1980)	3:32

== Personnel ==
- Peter Cetera – bass, guitar, lead & background vocals
- Terry Kath – guitars, lead & background vocals
- Robert Lamm – keyboards, lead & background vocals
- Lee Loughnane – trumpet, flugelhorn, percussion, background vocals
- James Pankow – trombone, percussion, background vocals
- Walter Parazaider – woodwinds, percussion, background vocals
- Danny Seraphine – drums, percussion
- Laudir de Oliveira – percussion
- James William Guercio – producer
- John Berg – design
- Nick Fasciano – logo
- Reid Miles – photography

== Charts ==
=== Weekly charts ===
Chart (1975–1977)	Peak position
Australian Albums (Kent Music Report)	16
Canada Top Albums/CDs (RPM)	1
Dutch Albums (Album Top 100)	4
New Zealand Albums (RMNZ)	7
US Billboard 200	1

Chart (2025)	Peak position
Hungarian Physical Albums (MAHASZ)	11

=== Year-end charts ===
Chart (1976)	Position
Canada Top Albums/CDs (RPM)	13

== Certifications ==
Region	Certification	Certified units/sales
Canada (Music Canada)	3× Platinum	300,000^{^}
United States (RIAA)	5× Platinum	5,000,000^{^}
^{^} Shipments figures based on certification alone.
