= Live in Japan (Chicago album) =

Live album by Chicago
- Released: November 1972
- Recorded: June 10, 11 and 14, 1972
- Venue: Osaka Festival Hall (Osaka)
- Genre: Rock
- Length: 104:15
- Label: CBS/Sony Japan
- Producer: James William Guercio

Chicago chronology
Chicago V (1972)	Live in Japan (1972)	Chicago VI (1973)

Professional ratings
Review scores
Source	Rating
AllMusic	4/5 stars
Prog	3.5/5 stars
Record Collector	3/5 stars

Live in Japan is a live album by American rock band Chicago, released in November 1972. It was recorded over the course of three days at the Osaka Festival Hall on the band's tour in support of Chicago V in 1972. The group recorded Japanese-language versions of "Lowdown" and "Questions 67 And 68" to coincide with their Japan performances. They performed both songs in Japanese during their stay, which are documented on this album.

Originally, the album was released as a two-LP set (CBS/Sony SOPJ 31-32XR), and only in Japan. The album was released in the U.S. in 1996 as a two-CD set (CRD-3030) on Chicago's own label, Chicago Records.

Live in Japan does not follow Chicago's convention of numbering albums. Chicago's other early live album, 1971's Chicago at Carnegie Hall, however, is part of the canon, with the numbering for the album being 'IV'.

== Sound quality ==
Chicago founding member James Pankow was always particularly critical of the 1971 album Chicago at Carnegie Hall, saying, "I hate it. The acoustics of Carnegie Hall were never meant for amplified music, and the sound of the brass after being mic'd came out sounding like kazoos."

Walter Parazaider said about the sound quality of Live in Japan, "The Japanese hooked up two eight-track machines together to make 16 tracks. The quality of the sound was excellent."

== Re-release ==
The album was reissued in March 2014 worldwide faithfully replicating the original LP design including a cardboard sleeve, booklet with photos and all the lyrics in very difficult to read small font.

== Track listing ==
Side one
No.	Title	Writer(s)	Length
1.	"Dialogue (Part I & II)"	Robert Lamm	6:55
2.	"A Hit by Varèse"	Lamm	4:43
3.	"Lowdown" (Japanese Version)	Peter Cetera; Danny Seraphine; Osamu Kitayama	4:14
4.	"State of the Union"	Lamm	8:14
5.	"Saturday in the Park"	Lamm	4:19

Side two
No.	Title	Writer(s)	Length
1.	"Ballet for a Girl in Buchannon"; 1. "Make Me Smile"; 2. "So Much to Say, So Much to Give"; 3. "Anxiety's Moment"; 4. "West Virginia Fantasies"; 5. "Colour My World"; 6. "To Be Free"; 7. "Now More Than Ever"	James Pankow	14:05; 3:17; 0:59; 1:02; 1:32; 3:22; 2:17; 1:36
2.	"Beginnings"	Lamm	6:36
3.	"Mississippi Delta City Blues"	Terry Kath	5:50

Side three
No.	Title	Writer(s)	Length
1.	"A Song for Richard and His Friends"	Lamm	7:54
2.	"Does Anybody Really Know What Time It Is?" (Free Form Intro)	Lamm	6:15
3.	"Does Anybody Really Know What Time It Is?"	Lamm	3:53
4.	"Questions 67 and 68" (Japanese Version)	Lamm; Kazuko Katagiri	4:51

Side four
No.	Title	Writer(s)	Length
1.	"25 or 6 to 4"	Lamm	9:14
2.	"I'm a Man"	Steve Winwood; Jimmy Miller	10:43
3.	"Free"	Lamm	6:29

== Personnel ==
- Peter Cetera: bass, vocals
- Terry Kath: guitar, vocals
- Robert Lamm: keyboards, vocals
- Lee Loughnane: trumpet, percussion, background vocals
- James Pankow: trombone, percussion, background vocals
- Walter Parazaider: woodwinds, percussion, background vocals
- Danny Seraphine: drums
