= Chicago at Carnegie Hall =

Live album by Chicago
- Released: October 25, 1971
- Recorded: April 5–10, 1971
- Venue: Carnegie Hall (New York City)
- Genres: Jazz fusion; rock
- Length: 1971: 2:48:33; 2005: 3:43:59; 2021: 14:34:00
- Label: Columbia
- Producer: James William Guercio

Chicago chronology
Chicago III (1971)	Chicago at Carnegie Hall (1971)	Chicago V (1972)

Chicago at Carnegie Hall (also known as Chicago IV) is the first live album, and fourth album overall, by American band Chicago. It was initially released on October 25, 1971 by Columbia Records as a four-LP vinyl box set, and was also available for a time as two separate two-record sets. A quadraphonic mix of the album was proposed, but was never made, possibly due to the band's objection to the album being released in the first place. This is the only Chicago album of the group's first ten releases not to have a quadraphonic release in any format.

The album reached No. 3 on the Billboard 200. It was certified gold by the Recording Industry Association of America (RIAA) two weeks after its release, and was certified platinum in 1986.

== Background ==
While touring in support of Chicago III, Chicago played Carnegie Hall for a week in April 1971 and recorded all of their shows. A four-LP box set for release as Chicago's fourth album (that distinction being responsible for the album's nickname of Chicago IV) was the result. Walter Parazaider told writer William James Ruhlmann that "The reason behind the live record for Carnegie Hall is, we were the first rock 'n' roll group to sell out a week at Carnegie Hall, and that was worth rolling up the trucks for, putting the mikes up there, and really chronicling what happened in 1971."

Columbia were very skeptical on the risk the extended set posed, and with a decrease in royalties to counter that fear (a similar situation befell their 1969 debut, Chicago Transit Authority), Chicago released Chicago at Carnegie Hall that October to a mixed reaction. While the set sold very well, reaching No. 3 in the US (but failing to chart in the UK), the critics found the album too long—and even indulgent with its inclusions of tune-ups.

The band themselves have remained divided through the years over the merits of the album. Robert Lamm and Walter Parazaider defended the album to William James Ruhlmann, while James Pankow and Peter Cetera were not happy with the result. Pankow told Ruhlmann, "I hate it. ... The acoustics of Carnegie Hall were never meant for amplified music, ...the brass after being miked came out sounding like kazoos." Lee Loughnane said that although he thinks the album is good, there were many things he didn't like about it and that he didn't think the album should have been released.

In recognition of setting Carnegie Hall records and the ensuing four LP live recordings, the group was awarded a Billboard 1972 Trendsetter Award. Despite poor sound quality, Chicago at Carnegie Hall, according to William James Ruhlmann, went on to become "perhaps" the best-selling box set by a rock act until the release of the Live/1975-85 five-LP live box set by Bruce Springsteen & the E Street Band in 1986. It is still the best-selling four-LP set.

In 2005, Chicago at Carnegie Hall was remastered and re-issued on three CDs by Rhino Records with improved sound quality, a bonus disc of eight tracks of alternate takes and songs not on the 1971 edition, and recreations of nearly all the original posters and packaging.

On Monday April 5, 2021, 50 years to the day of their first Carnegie Hall show, Rhino Records announced a 50th Anniversary 16-CD box set called Chicago Live At Carnegie Hall Complete. The collection includes all six shows in their entirety which were performed from April 5 through April 10, 1971, plus two matinee performances. The set was produced by engineer Tim Jessup along with band member Lee Loughnane, and was released on September 10, 2021.

== Artwork and packaging ==
The original LP release of this set contained two giant posters of the band, a poster of Carnegie Hall's exterior, an insert about voting information, and a 20-page softcover booklet; this last contained photos of the band members playing during the concert, and on the back bore a full touring schedule from their first tour through their 1971 US tour. The band's official web site labels the cover design "white tile".

== Reception ==
Professional ratings
Review scores
Source	Rating
AllMusic	2.5/5 stars
Christgau's Record Guide	C−
Creem	negative

Lester Bangs, writing for Creem in February 1972, considered the musicianship on Chicago at Carnegie Hall "technically competent" but "there are just too many times when you can hear all the parts better than the whole." He also considered the arrangements "sodden" carbon copies of the studio versions augmented with "directionless solos," and called the album the band's worst.

In a retrospective review, Lindsay Planer of Allmusic praised the "muscular" performances of several songs, but considered the reeds and the brass thin-sounding, and Carnegie Hall to be acoustically poor for amplified rock.

== Track listing ==
Side one
No.	Title	Writer(s)	Lead vocals	Length
1.	"In the Country"	Terry Kath	Kath; Peter Cetera	10:35
2.	"Fancy Colours"	Robert Lamm	Cetera	5:15
3.	"Does Anybody Really Know What Time It Is? (Free Form Intro)"	Lamm		6:20
4.	"Does Anybody Really Know What Time It Is?"	Lamm	Lamm	3:47

Side two
No.	Title	Writer(s)	Lead vocals	Length
1.	"South California Purples"	Lamm	Lamm	15:35
2.	"Questions 67 and 68"	Lamm	Lamm; Cetera	5:36

Side three
No.	Title	Writer(s)	Lead vocals	Length
1.	"Sing a Mean Tune Kid"	Lamm	Cetera	12:54
2.	"Beginnings"	Lamm	Lamm	6:27

Side four
No.	Title	Writer(s)	Lead vocals	Length
1.	"It Better End Soon – 1st Movement"	Lamm	Kath	2:54
2.	"It Better End Soon – 2nd Movement (Flute Solo)"	Lamm; Walter Parazaider		5:00
3.	"It Better End Soon – 3rd Movement (Guitar Solo)"	Lamm; Kath		2:42
4.	"It Better End Soon – 4th Movement (Preach)"	Lamm; Kath	Kath	3:09
5.	"It Better End Soon – 5th Movement"	Lamm	Kath	2:09

Side five
No.	Title	Writer(s)	Lead vocals	Length
1.	"Introduction"	Kath	Kath	7:10
2.	"Mother"	Lamm	Lamm	8:21
3.	"Lowdown"	Cetera; Danny Seraphine	Cetera	3:58

Side six
No.	Title	Writer(s)	Lead vocals	Length
1.	"Flight 602"	Lamm	Lamm	3:31
2.	"Motorboat to Mars"	Seraphine		3:00
3.	"Free"	Lamm	Kath	5:15
4.	"Where Do We Go from Here?"	Cetera	Cetera	4:08
5.	"I Don't Want Your Money"	Lamm; Kath	Lamm	5:23

Side seven
No.	Title	Writer(s)	Lead vocals	Length
1.	"Happy 'Cause I'm Going Home"	Lamm	Lamm; Cetera	7:56
2.	"Ballet for a Girl in Buchannon"; 1. "Make Me Smile"; 2. "So Much to Say, So Much to Give"; 3. "Anxiety's Moment"; 4. "West Virginia Fantasies"; 5. "Colour My World"; 6. "To Be Free"; 7. "Now More Than Ever"	James Pankow	Kath; Lamm Kath Kath	15:25; 3:30; 1:00; 1:08; 1:31; 3:26; 1:21; 3:25

Side eight
No.	Title	Writer(s)	Lead vocals	Length
1.	"A Song for Richard and His Friends"	Lamm	Lamm	6:58
2.	"25 or 6 to 4"	Lamm	Cetera	6:35
3.	"I'm a Man"	Steve Winwood; Jimmy Miller	Kath; Lamm; Cetera	8:51

== Personnel ==
- Terry Kath – guitar and vocals
- Peter Cetera – bass and vocals
- Robert Lamm – keyboards and vocals
- Lee Loughnane – trumpet, background vocals, percussion, guitar on "Flight 602" and "Where Do We Go From Here?"
- Walter Parazaider – woodwinds, percussion, background vocals
- James Pankow – trombone, percussion
- Danny Seraphine – drums

== Production ==
- Produced by James William Guercio
- Engineers – Don Puluse, Bud Graham, Hank Altman, Aaron Baron and Larry Dahlstrom
- Recorded at Carnegie Hall, New York, NY (by Location Recorders)
- Mixed at Columbia Recording Studios, New York, NY
- Art Direction – John Berg/Virginia Team
- Artwork – Fuding Cheng
- Poster Design – Ron Coro
- Photography – Allen Goldblatt and Fred Lombardi
- Poster Photo – Frank Laffire
- Lettering – Beverly Scott

== Charts ==
Chart (1971–1972)	Peak position
Australian Albums (Kent Music Report)	26
Canada Top Albums/CDs (RPM)	3
Japanese Albums (Oricon)	21
US Billboard 200	3

Chart (2022)	Peak position
Hungarian Albums (MAHASZ)	29

== Certifications ==
Region	Certification	Certified units/sales
Canada (Music Canada)	Gold	50,000^{^}
United States (RIAA)	Platinum	1,000,000^{^}
^{^} Shipments figures based on certification alone.
