= South California Purples =

1969 song by the band Chicago

Song by Chicago

from the album Chicago Transit Authority
- Released: April 28, 1969
- Recorded: January 1969
- Genre: Blues rock, hard rock
- Length: 6:11
- Label: Columbia Records
- Songwriter: Robert Lamm
- Producer: James William Guercio

"South California Purples" (originally titled "Southern California Purples") is a song written and sung by Robert Lamm for the rock band Chicago and recorded for their debut album Chicago Transit Authority (1969).

The song quotes the opening line from The Beatles' "I Am the Walrus".

A live version appears on 1971's Chicago at Carnegie Hall, lasting over fifteen minutes and on VI Decades Live (This Is What We Do), recorded at The Isle Of Wight Festival.

== Personnel ==
- Robert Lamm – lead vocals, keyboards
- Terry Kath – guitar, backing vocals
- Peter Cetera – bass, backing vocals
- Danny Seraphine – drums, percussion
- Jimmy Pankow – trombone
- Lee Loughnane – trumpet
- Walt Parazaider – tenor saxophone
