= Does Anybody Really Know What Time It Is? =

Single by Chicago

from the album Chicago Transit Authority
- B-side: "Listen"
- Released: November 4, 1970
- Recorded: January 27-30, 1969
- Genre: Jazz fusion; soft rock
- Length: 4:36 (album version); 3:20 (single version); 2:54 (radio edit)
- Label: Columbia
- Songwriter: Robert Lamm
- Producer: James William Guercio

Chicago singles chronology
"25 or 6 to 4" (1970)	"Does Anybody Really Know What Time It Is?" (1970)	"Free" (1971)

"Does Anybody Really Know What Time It Is?" is a song written and sung by Robert Lamm and recorded by the group Chicago. It was included on their 1969 debut album Chicago Transit Authority and released as a single in 1970.

== Background ==
According to Robert Lamm, "Does Anybody Really Know What Time It Is?" was the first song recorded for their debut album. The song was not released as a single until two tracks from the band's second album, "Make Me Smile" and "25 or 6 to 4", had become hits. It became the band's third straight Top 10 single, peaking at No. 7 in the U.S. and No. 2 in Canada. Because the song straddled years in its chart run, it is not ranked on the major U.S. year-end charts. However, in Canada, where it charted higher, it is ranked as both the 59th biggest hit of 1970 and the 37th biggest hit of 1971.

According to Allmusic critic Lindsay Planer, the lyrics are about "the hurried and harried modern society as it ultimately fails to take the 'time' to appreciate anything existing outside of its insular world."

Lamm said of the song:

"[It's] not a complicated song, but it’s certainly a quirky song. But that was my intent. I wanted to write something that wasn’t ordinary, that wasn’t blues-based, that didn’t have ice cream changes, and would allow the horns to shine and give Lee Loughnane a solo. So all that was the intent."

The original uncut album version opens with a 1:15 free form piano solo performed by Lamm. A spoken verse by Lamm is mixed into the sung final verse of the album version. The single version does not include the free form intro, and was originally mixed and issued in mono. A stereo re-edit (beginning from the point where the free form intro leaves off) was issued on the group's Only the Beginning greatest hits CD set.

A 2:54 shorter edit (omitting not only the opening free-form piano solo but also the subsequent varying-time-signature horn/piano dialog—therefore starting at the trumpet solo which begins the main movement—and without the spoken part) was included on the original vinyl version of Chicago's Greatest Hits, but was not included on the CD version. This shorter edit was included on the CD version of the compilation album If You Leave Me Now. This version was used as a radio edit version. A shorter version at 2:46 (starting midway through the trumpet solo) was issued as a promotional single, which finally appeared on 2007's The Best of Chicago: 40th Anniversary Edition.

A live version on the Chicago at Carnegie Hall box set presents an expanded version of the "free form" intro, which itself is given its own track.

Various versions of the song receive airplay; the promotional single edit is the version played on certain 'Classic Hits' stations and 1970s radio shows. For example, radio station KKMJ plays the promo edit version on its 'Super Songs' of the 70s weekend, as does Classic Hits KXBT. By contrast, the True Oldies Channel plays the 3:20 single version. An AM radio station in Boston (WJIB 740 which also simulcasts in Maine as WJTO 730) plays the original vinyl Chicago IX edit.

== Composition ==
Right after the free form piano solo, the time signature of the fanfare preceding the trumpet solo is, per bar, $\tfrac{4}{4}$, $\tfrac{7}{8}$, $\tfrac{9}{8}$, $\tfrac{4}{4}$, $\tfrac{7}{8}$ and $\tfrac{4}{4}$, then transitions to a section in $\tfrac{5}{8}$ for 6 bars, then goes into $\tfrac{6}{8}$ for one bar. The song stays in $\tfrac{4}{4}$ after that.

== Reception ==
Cash Box said of the song that Chicago's "exciting arrangements and superb material add up to an aural outburst that should blossom as a flowering chart entry." Record World said that it's a "winning cut" and a "natural hit if ever there was one."

== Personnel ==
- Robert Lamm - lead vocals, acoustic piano, spoken dialogue
- Terry Kath - electric guitar, backing vocals
- Peter Cetera - bass guitar, backing vocals
- Danny Seraphine - drums
- Lee Loughnane - trumpet
- James Pankow - trombone
- Walter Parazaider - tenor saxophone

== Chart performance ==
=== Weekly charts ===
Chart (1970–71)	Peak position
Australia KMR	35
Canada Top Singles (RPM)	2
New Zealand (Listener)	17
US Billboard Hot 100	7
US Adult Contemporary (Billboard)	5
US Cash Box Top 100	5

=== Year-end charts ===
Chart (1970)	Rank
Canada	59

Chart (1971)	Rank
Canada	37
US (Joel Whitburn's Pop Annual)	61
