= Questions 67 and 68 =

1969 single by Chicago

Single by Chicago

from the album Chicago Transit Authority
- B-side: "Listen" (Original); "I'm a Man" (Re-release)
- Released: July 3, 1969 September 16, 1971
- Recorded: January 27/30, 1969
- Genre: Jazz rock
- Length: 5:03 (album version); 4:48 (1969 single version); 3:26 (1971 single edit); 4:52 (Only the Beginning edit)
- Label: Columbia
- Songwriter: Robert Lamm
- Producer: James William Guercio

Chicago singles chronology
"Questions 67 and 68" (1969)	"Beginnings" (1969)
""Beginnings"/ "Colour My World"" (1971)	""Questions 67 and 68" / "I'm a Man"" (1971)	"Saturday in the Park" (1972)

Alternative cover
- 1971 German re-release

"Questions 67 and 68" is song by the American rock band Chicago (then known as Chicago Transit Authority) and recorded for their debut album Chicago Transit Authority. It was their first single release and written by Robert Lamm. Peter Cetera is the primary lead singer with Lamm also on vocals. In 2015, Dave Swanson, writing for Ultimate Classic Rock, listed the song as ninth in a list of top ten Chicago songs. Writing for Rock Cellar magazine, Frank Mastropolo rated the song as number 11 in a list of "Top 11 Question Songs".

== Lyrics and music ==
The questions in "Questions 67 and 68" relate to the nature of a romantic relationship Lamm had during 1967 and 1968. In 2008, Lamm said, "It’s about a girl I knew during those years with a hint of acid imagery and very Beatles influenced." The lyrics include the title phrase only as the last words.

With respect to the horn arrangement, James Pankow said in a 2000 Goldmine article, "In the old days, however, I used to write horns very harmonically. 'Questions 67 and 68' is probably a very good example of how I used to approach horns. I had no rests. We played from the first bar of the song, which is not very musical anymore. We got away with that then, I guess. Guercio [Chicago's producer then] used to triple, quite often. He'd have three sections, and the one in the middle was me playing pedals, that's why it sounded like Count Basie. It sounded like a big band."

== Critical reception ==
Billboard described the single as "a soulful, driving rhythm ballad with big band in strong support," and as a "potent chart item." Ultimate Classic Rock critic Dave Swanson rated it as Chicago's 9th best song, calling it "a clear early example of the signature Chicago sound." The Patriot-News critic Nick Williams rated it as Chicago's 13th best song, particularly praising Cetera's vocal performance.

== Chart performance ==
Released in July 1969, the song was released as a mono single version with a slightly altered vocal mix. This peaked at No. 71 on the US Billboard Hot 100 and No. 82 on the Cash Box Top 100. After the band's success with subsequent singles, "Questions 67 and 68" was edited to a more radio-friendly length and was re-released in September 1971, with "I'm a Man" as the B-side. The edited single climbed to No. 24 on Billboard and No. 13 on Cash Box.

=== Weekly charts ===
Chart (1969)	Peak position
Canada RPM Top Singles	54
France (IFOP)	79
US Billboard Hot 100	71
US Cash Box Top 100	82

Chart (1971)	Peak position
US Billboard Hot 100	24
US Billboard Easy Listening	34
US Cash Box Top 100	13

== Japanese release ==
Cetera and Lamm recorded Japanese-language vocals for the song in 1971, and the version of the song with those vocals was released as a single in Japan. Columbia Records released the song only as a radio-only promotional 45 rpm single, with the English version on the other side. This recording was released digitally in 1998 on the Japan-only compilation CD The Heart Of Chicago 1967-1971 Volume II Special Edition (green cover), which also contains "Lowdown" sung in Japanese. The group performed the song live with the Japanese lyrics during tours of Japan in 1972, documented on the Live In Japan album. The single's duration is incorrectly listed as 3:07, rather than 4:36, and omits the 22 second final sustained note.

== Personnel ==
- Peter Cetera – lead vocals, bass
- Robert Lamm – backing and lead vocals, piano
- Terry Kath – guitar
- Danny Seraphine – drums
- Jimmy Pankow – trombone
- Lee Loughnane – trumpet
- Walt Parazaider – tenor saxophone

== Cover versions ==
- Panic! at the Disco sampled this song in "Hallelujah".
- Leonid and Friends on Chicagovich
