= If You Leave Me Now (disambiguation) =

"If You Leave Me Now" is a 1976 song by American band Chicago.

If You Leave Me Now may also refer to:

- If You Leave Me Now (album), a 1983 compilation by Chicago
- "If You Leave Me Now" (Charlie Puth song), 2018
- "If You Leave Me Now", a 2016 song by Foxes from the album All I Need
- "If You Leave Me Now", a 1989 song by Jaya
- "If You Leave Me Now, a 2000 song by Mónica Naranjo from the album Minage
