= South California =

South California can mean one of these four terms:

- Southern California
- South California Purples
- Baja California
- South California (proposed U.S. state)
