= Chicago III =

Studio album by Chicago
- Released: January 11, 1971
- Recorded: June – December 1970
- Studios: CBS 30th Street, New York City
- Genres: Rock; jazz rock; progressive rock
- Length: 71:29
- Label: Columbia
- Producer: James William Guercio

Chicago chronology
Chicago (1970)	Chicago III (1971)	Chicago at Carnegie Hall (1971)

Singles from Chicago III
- 1. "Free" Released: February 1971; 2. "Lowdown" Released: April 1971

Professional ratings
Review scores
Source	Rating
AllMusic	4/5 stars

Chicago III is the third studio album by the American rock band Chicago. It was released on January 11, 1971, through Columbia Records. The album was produced by James William Guercio and was the band's third consecutive double album in less than two years.

Much like the previous year's Chicago, Chicago III is made up of both multi-part suites and more conventional individual songs. The album saw the band integrate a number of different genres including folk and country ("What Else Can I Say", "Flight 602"), free improvisation ("Free Country"), and musique concrète ("Progress?") into their sound, while also continuing in their trademark jazz-rock style.

Chicago III was a critical and commercial success. It peaked at number two in the US, their highest chart placement at that point, and received positive reviews. While neither of its singles ("Free" and "Lowdown") matched the success of the band's previous and following singles, both managed to make the Top 40, peaking at numbers 20 and 35, respectively. After the release of the album, Chicago would perform at New York's Carnegie Hall. Performances from this run would be released on the following album, Chicago at Carnegie Hall.

== Background ==
In the wake of the enormous worldwide success of their second album, Chicago spent almost all of 1970 on the road, an exhausting undertaking. Former drummer Danny Seraphine, described the members of the band as "fatigued and road-weary" when they went into the studio to record the album.

Released in January 1971, initially on Columbia Records, Chicago III — the band's first album to sport a Roman numeral in its title — sold well upon its release and was certified gold by the Recording Industry Association of America (RIAA) a month later. It provided Chicago with its highest charting disc yet in the US, going to No. 2 on the Billboard 200. "Free", written by Robert Lamm, made it into the top 20 of the Billboard Hot 100 chart, and "Lowdown", co-written by Peter Cetera and Danny Seraphine, reached the top 40. Chicago III marked a dwindling in UK fortunes in comparison to the band's first two albums, Chicago Transit Authority and Chicago, reaching No. 9 in a brief chart run.

In 1974, jazz bandleader Stan Kenton added a suite of songs from the album ("Canon", "Mother", "Once Upon a Time" and "Free") to his band's repertoire, releasing it on the album Stan Kenton Plays Chicago.

== Musical style, writing, composition ==
The band had used up its storehouse of original material on its first two albums. As such, they needed to write new material for Chicago III, and according to Seraphine, the band's songwriters worked "nonstop" to achieve this. He also said the band "took the opportunity to experiment with instrumentals and showcase our skills as musicians."

Their long hours on the road gave the principal songwriters, Robert Lamm, Terry Kath and James Pankow, much food for thought, resulting in more serious subject matter, which contrasted with the positivity of their first two sets. In his retrospective review of the album, Jeff Giles writes that Lamm's "Travel Suite" was "inspired by the boredom, loneliness, and beauty of the road," and characterizes Pankow's "Elegy" suite is an "ecologically minded composition" (an issue Lamm also touches upon in "Mother"). While Kath's multi-part "An Hour in the Shower" provides a reprieve from the sobering explorations elsewhere, Chicago III was the result of a band who had seen the flip side of the world over the last several months. "Lowdown", co-written by Peter Cetera and Danny Seraphine, was Seraphine's first co-writing credit, and he was appreciative of the support Cetera gave him during the writing process.

== Recording and production ==
The album was produced by James William Guercio, who was Chicago's producer for its first eleven albums. This album was mixed and released in both stereo and quadraphonic. In 2002, Chicago III was remastered and reissued on one CD by Rhino Records.

== Artwork and packaging ==
The album cover design is titled "Tattered Flag" on the band's website. Included with the album was a poster of the band dressed in the uniforms of America's wars, standing in front of a field of crosses, representing those who had died in the still ongoing Vietnam War. It also gave the number of casualties from each war up until the time of the album's release.

== Critical reception ==
Billboard wrote that Chicago showed "once again quality exceeds quantity" with their third release, highlighting "Free", "Loneliness is Just a Word", and "What Else Can I Say" as the songs with the most commercial vocals. Cashbox believed that sides one and four of the album were "rather tedious in their pretentiousness", with the other two sides demonstrating an "excellent Chicago in a transitional stage, which points to an explosive fourth album." Record World called Chicago III "another one of their impressive two-record sets". Don Lass of the Asbury Park Press believed that the instrumental passages were better than the lyrics, concluding that it went in "so many directions", resulting in an album that was "excellent only about half of the time".

== Track listing ==
Side one
No.	Title	Writer(s)	Lead vocals	Length
1.	"Sing a Mean Tune Kid"	Robert Lamm	Peter Cetera	9:13
2.	"Loneliness is Just a Word"	Lamm	Terry Kath	2:36
3.	"What Else Can I Say"	Cetera	Cetera	3:12
4.	"I Don't Want Your Money"	Lamm; Kath	Lamm	4:47

Side two
No.	Title	Writer(s)	Lead vocals	Length
1.	"Travel Suite"; 1. "Flight 602"; 2. "Motorboat to Mars"; 3. "Free"; 4. "Free Country"; 5. "At the Sunrise"; 6. "Happy 'Cause I'm Going Home"	Lamm; Danny Seraphine; Lamm: Lamm; Kath; Walter Parazaider; Lamm; Lamm	Lamm; Instrumental; Kath; Instrumental: Lamm; Cetera; Lamm; Cetera	22:30; 2:45; 1:30; 2:16; 5:46; 2:48; 7:28

Side three
No.	Title	Writer(s)	Lead vocals	Length
1.	"Mother"	Lamm	Lamm	4:30
2.	"Lowdown"	Cetera; Seraphine	Cetera	3:35
3.	"An Hour in the Shower"; 1. "A Hard Risin' Morning Without Breakfast"; 2. "Off to Work"; 3. "Fallin' Out"; 4. "Dreamin' Home"; 5. "Morning Blues Again"	Kath	Kath	5:30; 1:52; 0:45; 0:53; 0:49; 1:11

Side four
No.	Title	Writer(s)	Lead vocals	Length
1.	"Elegy"; 1. "When All the Laughter Dies in Sorrow"; 2. "Canon"; 3. "Once Upon a Time..."; 4. "Progress?" (Note: Sound effects courtesy of the Industrial Revolution.); 5. "The Approaching Storm"; 6. "Man vs. Man: The End"	Kendrew Lascelles; James Pankow; Pankow: Pankow; James William Guercio; Pankow; Pankow	Lamm; Instrumental; Instrumental; Instrumental; Instrumental; Instrumental	15:27; 1:03; 1:05; 2:34; 2:34; 6:26; 1:33

== Personnel ==
=== Chicago ===
- Peter Cetera – bass, lead and backing vocals
- Terry Kath – guitars, lead and backing vocals
- Robert Lamm – keyboards, lead and backing vocals, spoken word on "When All the Laughter Dies in Sorrow".
- Lee Loughnane – trumpet
- James Pankow – trombone
- Walter Parazaider – saxophone, flute
- Danny Seraphine – drums, percussion

== Production ==
- Producer – James William Guercio
- Engineering – Don Puluse and Sy Mitchell
- Recording – Lou Waxman and Willie Greer
- Logo design – Nick Fasciano
- Album design – John Berg
- Flag design – Natalie Williams
- Photography – Sandy Speiser
- Poster photo – Steve Horn and Norm Griner
- Lettering – Annette Kawecki and Melanie Marder for Poseidon Productions

== Charts ==
=== Weekly charts ===
Weekly chart performance for Chicago III
Chart (1971)	Peak position
Australian Albums (Kent Music Report)	6
Canada Top Albums/CDs (RPM)	7
Dutch Albums (Album Top 100)	5
German Albums (Offizielle Top 100)	17
Finnish Albums (Suomen virallinen lista)	6
Italian Albums (Musica e Dischi)	9
Japanese Albums (Oricon)	14
Norwegian Albums (VG-lista)	8
UK Albums (Official Charts)	9
US Billboard Top LPs	2
US Best Selling Soul LP's (Billboard)	22

=== Year-end charts ===
Year-end chart performance for Chicago III
Chart (1971)	Position
Dutch Albums (Album Top 100)	42

== Certifications ==
Region	Certification	Certified units/sales
Canada (Music Canada)	Gold	50,000^{^}
United States (RIAA)	Platinum	1,000,000^{^}
^{^} Shipments figures based on certification alone.
