= Lowdown (Chicago song) =

Single by Chicago

from the album Chicago III
- B-side: "Loneliness Is Just a Word"
- Released: April 19, 1971
- Recorded: 1970
- Genre: Rock
- Length: 3:35
- Label: Columbia
- Songwriters: Peter Cetera, Danny Seraphine
- Producer: James William Guercio

Chicago singles chronology
"Free" (1971)	"Lowdown" (1971)	"Beginnings/Colour My World" (1971)

"Lowdown" is a song written by Peter Cetera and Danny Seraphine for the rock band Chicago and recorded for their third album Chicago III (1971). It was the second single released from this album, and peaked at No. 35 on the U.S. Billboard Hot 100. Cetera provided lead vocals while guitarist Terry Kath used a fuzzbox and wah-wah pedal for his guitar solo and Robert Lamm made prominent use of the Hammond organ.

A Japanese-language version of the song was recorded in 1972 for the Japan market and released as a single. It would be released digitally on the Japan-only compilation CD The Heart of Chicago 1967-1971 Volume II Special Edition (green cover), which also contains "Questions 67 and 68" sung in Japanese. The group performed the song live with the Japanese lyrics during tours of Japan in 1972, documented on the Live in Japan album.

== Background ==
This was Cetera's second song-writing effort for the group, after "Where Do We Go From Here" on Chicago II, as well as Seraphine's first co-writing credit. According to group biographer, William James Ruhlmann, Cetera wrote the song with Seraphine despite having been "told" that "Where Do We Go From Here" would probably be his last contribution because "the group was very happy with the writers they had, thank you, and we didn't need any more contributions."

According to Cetera's account, Terry Kath was not pleased with his guitar contributions to the song, and told Cetera, " 'Don't you ever tell anybody I ever played guitar on this record’". Cetera argues that Kath's lack of enthusiasm took the heart out of the song.

== Critical reception ==
Record World said that it is "exceptional in every department."

Music critics in a 2019 article published by Billboard magazine ranked "Lowdown" the 24th best Chicago song. They called "Lowdown" a "bounding tune . . . and one of the most beloved tracks off Chicago III."

== Personnel ==
- Peter Cetera – lead vocals, bass
- Terry Kath – guitar, backing vocals
- Robert Lamm – keyboards
- James Pankow – trombone
- Lee Loughnane – trumpet
- Walter Parazaider – tenor saxophone
- Danny Seraphine – drums, percussion

== Chart performance ==
Chart (1971)	Peak position
US Billboard Hot 100	35
