= A Hit by Varèse =

1972 song by Chicago

Song by Chicago

from the album Chicago V
- Released: July 10, 1972
- Recorded: 1971
- Studio: Columbia 52nd Street, New York City
- Length: 4:56
- Label: Columbia
- Songwriter: Robert Lamm
- Producer: James William Guercio

"A Hit by Varèse" is a song written by Robert Lamm that was first released by the band Chicago as the lead track to their 1972 album Chicago V. The title refers to electronic music pioneer Edgard Varèse.

== Background ==
Lamm first heard about Edgar Varèse prior to the creation of Chicago through Frank Zappa's Freak Out! album. Terry Kath then retrieved a few LPs from Varèse and played them through a Voice of the Theater speaker system in an apartment unit that Lamm and Kath shared with Lee Loughnane. Lamm commented that the music "set us free in terms of what was possible musically".

What I was trying to say in 'A Hit By Varèse' was 'Wouldn't it be great if music this free could actually be accepted on radio–not just by the programmers, but by the people listening?'

AllMusic critic Lindsay Planer described the song as "progressive free-form". Winston-Salem Journal reporter Jim Shertzer characterized it as "a mocking, mournful plea to pop music tastes. Planer felt that the music was influenced more by progressive rock in Emerson, Lake and Palmer's Tarkus and by Yes than by Varèse himself.

Shertzer described the vocals as being sung "over steady but vigorous, pulsing cadences from guitar, bass and drums, and a stream of colorful brass." The song begins with guitar feedback from Terry Kath, followed by a guitar rhythm, and then an "odd" organ part by Lamm, after which the horns enter. After some vocals by Lamm, the guitar feedback returns, followed by solos from each of the horn players. There are also some drum, organ and guitar passages before the vocals return.

Lamm sings that he is tired of old music and needs "a seed that will lead to a hit by Varèse." Something Else! critic Bob Helme found irony in the line "I'm so tired of oldies and goldies and moldies that I want to cry!" given how Chicago's music would eventually evolve, saying "If only [Lamm] knew that's exactly what Chicago would turn into after the chart failure of Twenty 1 in 1991." Helme also found the line "Would you agree to attempt something new?" to be ironic, stating that "By the 2000s, he'd have to pratically [sic] get an act of Congress for the current band to agree to record new music." Contemporary critic Candi Puren felt that the lyrics and music represented a "welcome change" for the band.

== Reception ==
Shertzer suggested that "Surely Frank Zappa is off somewhere kicking himself for not having beaten Chicago with such a tribute to his avant-garde music idol. Dale Anderson, a critic for The Buffalo News, suggested that "one could get off on the blazing waggle of horns". Moncton Times and Transcript reviewer Andre Therriault called it "superb".

Ultimate Classic Rock critic Dave Swanson rated it as Chicago's 7th best song, calling it "the essence of jazz rock" and saying that it "finds Chicago as forward thinking as ever." Patriot-News critic Nick Williams rated it as Chicago's 11th best song, describing it as "funky" and calling it "a testament to Lamm's creativity". Troy L. Smith of Cleveland.com said that it's "greatest opening track of Chicago's career" and thought that it showcased the band's transition to more simplistic songwriting." Smith also suggested that many people consider this to be Chicago's "big song" with the possible exception of the big hit singles.
