= Chicago Transit Authority (album) =

- Front cover of LP releases.

Studio album by Chicago Transit Authority
- Released: April 28, 1969
- Recorded: January 27–30, 1969
- Studios: CBS 30th Street, New York City
- Genres: Jazz rock; progressive rock; blues rock
- Length: 76:32
- Label: Columbia
- Producer: James William Guercio

Chicago Transit Authority chronology
Chicago Transit Authority (1969)	Chicago (1970)

Singles from Chicago Transit Authority
- 1. "Questions 67 and 68" Released: July 1969 (US); 2. "Beginnings" Released: October 1969; 3. "I’m a Man" Released: January 1970; 4. "Does Anybody Really Know What Time It Is?" Released: October 1970

Alternative cover
- Back cover of LP releases and front cover of CD reissues.

The Chicago Transit Authority is the debut studio album by the American rock band Chicago, and the only album released under their original name Chicago Transit Authority. The double album was released on April 28, 1969, and became a sleeper hit, reaching number 17 on the Billboard 200 by 1971. The Chicago Transit Authority spawned several successful singles, including "Does Anybody Really Know What Time It Is?", "Questions 67 and 68" and "Beginnings". The album stayed on the Billboard chart for 171 weeks, beating the previous record for a rock album's longevity of 155 weeks (a record set by the Beatles 'White Album') and has been certified double platinum by the Recording Industry Association of America (RIAA). For this inaugural recording effort, the group was nominated for a Grammy Award for 1969 Best New Artist of the Year. The album was inducted into the Grammy Hall of Fame in 2014. In 2025, the album was deemed "culturally, historically, or aesthetically significant" by the Library of Congress and selected for preservation in the National Recording Registry.

== History ==
Chicago was formed in early 1967, first as the Big Thing, then Chicago Transit Authority when producer James William Guercio took them on in 1968. Their trademark was fusing brass and jazz with a soulful rock and roll feel that Guercio thought would prove successful, and lobbied his label to sign the band.

Chicago Transit Authority signed to Columbia Records late in 1968 and recorded their first album in late January 1969 at CBS studios on 52nd Street in New York City. While Guercio had recently produced Blood, Sweat & Tears' second album (which proved to be a huge smash), he did so to raise capital for his band, and to secure the contract with Columbia (which was reluctant at first to have two jazz-rock bands since Blood, Sweat & Tears was already on their roster). By the end of the Chicago Transit Authority sessions, the band had decided they wanted it to be a double album. Skeptical, as the band had no track record, Columbia agreed to the concept only if the group would take a royalty cut.

In addition to the material recorded for the album, "Wake Up Sunshine", "It Better End Soon" (both later released on their second album), "Loneliness is Just a Word" (later released on Chicago III), and an early version of "Mississippi Delta City Blues" (with mostly different music than its eventual versions on Live in Japan and Chicago XI) all date from this era, and were performed as early as 1968. Other early original songs, such as "Dedicated to Girl Number 1" and "Once Upon a Life", were never released.

== Musical style, writing, composition ==
Keyboardist Robert Lamm, guitarist Terry Kath and bassist Peter Cetera shared lead vocals, while James Pankow, Lee Loughnane and Walter Parazaider handled all brass and woodwinds (trombone, trumpet and saxophone, clarinet and flute respectively) (Note: Parazaider's photo in the album package shows him playing flute, but he doesn't actually play it on the album.) and Danny Seraphine played drums. Lamm, Kath and Pankow were the band's main composers at this time. Band members added percussion during sections of a song when they weren't playing their main instrument. For example, on "I'm a Man", Pankow was on cowbell, Parazaider on tambourine, and Loughnane on claves. According to Pankow, the band had included the song in their live set "since the beginning of the group". He added that the rest of the band had a "certain rhythm that we play on our instruments, and we try not to vary from that rhythm".

According to the album's original liner notes, the solo performance of Kath on "Free Form Guitar" was created without the use of any pedals. Kath instead plugged his Fender Stratocaster directly into his studio amplifier and improvised the entire track. The final song on the album, "Liberation" began with a horn part that was later fleshed out with some improvisation. Pankow said that "we stretched it out and put improvisational guitar in the middle and a freak out and an Amen cadence going out in a fast ending. It was just thrown together like that and we've kept it ever since."

The album includes material of a political nature. "The final side ... begins with 'Prologue, August 29, 1968,' a 50-second recording taken from the protests during the 1968 Democratic National Convention in Chicago. The words and sounds of Black militants, demonstrators and police are captured with the most memorable being the chant 'The whole world is watching.' ...These chants lead into the next cut 'Someday.' "

The album is one of two not to have any songwriting contributions from Cetera during his tenure in the band, the other being Chicago V. He started writing songs with the second album, Chicago.

== Recording and production ==
Because of dealings between the record company and the group's producer, James William Guercio, the group's studio time was limited by the record company to only five days of basic tracking and five days of overdubbing. The band recorded their parts from midnight to 8 a.m. as Simon & Garfunkel had been booked for the same recording studio for the remainder of the day. According to Guercio, the album was done on an 8-track console.

According to band member Walter Parazaider, when the group went into the studio to record the album, they "found out we knew very little about what we were doing. ... The first song was "Does Anybody Really Know What Time It Is?" We tried to record it as a band, live, all of us in the studio at once." Finally it was decided that drums, bass, keyboard, and guitars would be recorded first, and then the horns and vocals.

== Artwork ==
The cover design for the album is called "Painted Shingle" on the group's official website, and was designed by Nick Fasciano. The inside jacket features individual photos of each band member, which reviewer Paul Morelli notes, "For a band deliberately constructed to be a leaderless democracy, Robert Lamm (far right, standing) sure stands out in the band photos!"

== Release ==
Released in April 1969, Chicago Transit Authority (sometimes informally referred to simply as CTA) was not an immediate hit, eventually reaching No. 17 in the US and No. 9 in the UK. While critical reaction was generally favorable, sales were slow at first and the album initially failed to produce any hit singles, with the group seen as an album-oriented collective. Meanwhile, FM radio, with its album-oriented format, helped push sales along. In 1970 and 1971, "Does Anybody Really Know What Time It Is?" (No. 7), "Beginnings" (No. 7) and "Questions 67 and 68" (No. 71 and No. 24 for the 1971 re-release) all made it into the Billboard Hot 100 belatedly. Buoyed by the success of their later albums, Chicago Transit Authority had stayed on the charts for 171 weeks as of June 1975, setting the then record for a rock album's chart longevity by October 1974 at 155 weeks, and was certified gold (and later platinum and double platinum) by the Recording Industry Association of America (RIAA).

While the band toured the album, legal action was threatened by the actual Chicago Transit Authority, forcing the group to truncate their name to simply Chicago.

== Reception ==
Professional ratings
Review scores
Source	Rating
AllMusic	4/5 stars
Encyclopedia of Popular Music	4/5 stars
The Great Rock Discography	7/10
MusicHound	3.5/5
The Rolling Stone Album Guide	3/5 stars

Chicago Transit Authority has received acclaim since its release. Writing for Allmusic, Lindsay Planar wrote, "Few debut albums can boast as consistently solid an effort as the self-titled Chicago Transit Authority (1969). Even fewer can claim to have enough material to fill out a double-disc affair."

=== Awards and Honors ===
In 1970, the group was nominated for a Grammy Award for Best New Artist, though they would lose to Crosby, Stills and Nash.

In 2014, Chicago Transit Authority was inducted into the Grammy Hall of Fame.

Chicago Transit Authority is the only Chicago album listed in 1001 Albums You Must Hear Before You Die.

In 2025, Chicago Transit Authority was inducted to the National Recording Registry.

== Reissues ==
In 1974, the album was also mixed in quadraphonic sound and released on SQ encoded LP (GQ-33255) and Dolby Quadraphonic 8-Track (QCA-33255).

In 2002, Chicago Transit Authority was remastered and reissued on one CD by Rhino Records, after the rights to Chicago's Columbia Records catalog were assigned to the band themselves. Rhino Records trimmed some of the songs, noticeably the fadeouts on "Questions #67 and #68" (six seconds longer on the LP) and "Free Form Guitar" (five seconds longer), the 10 second gap between "Someday" and "Liberation", and some studio chatter.

In 2010, Rhino Handmade re-released the original quadraphonic mix of the album on a limited edition DTS DVD, and in 2016, in DTS-HD Master Audio, as part of Chicago Quadio Box Set.

On June 26, 2019, Rhino Records announced a 50th Anniversary Remix edition of Chicago Transit Authority, offering it in both CD and double LP formats. Although the press release announced an August 30, 2019 release date, the date was pushed back to September 13, 2019 outside of Canada. The band worked with engineer Tim Jessup, who also mixed the band’s Live at the Isle of Wight Festival. Robbie Gerson, reviewing the vinyl release for Audiophile Audition, gave an overall positive review, saying, "Rhino has done an outstanding job in re-mastering Chicago Transit Authority to 180-gram vinyl." In his review for All About Jazz, Doug Colette gave the CD four out of five stars, noting that there's "less precedence for the harmony singing," but that there's "wallop to the drums," "edge to the guitar," and "great care throughout to highlight, without overstatement but with proportionate accuracy and impact, the tightly-fused rhythm work of drummer Danny Seraphine and bassist Peter Cetera: both sound equally vigorous and muscular in their playing."

== Track listing ==
Side one
No.	Title	Writer(s)	Lead vocals	Length
1.	"Introduction"	Terry Kath	Kath	6:35
2.	"Does Anybody Really Know What Time It Is?"	Robert Lamm	Lamm	4:36
3.	"Beginnings"	Lamm	Lamm	7:54

Side two
No.	Title	Writer(s)	Lead vocals	Length
1.	"Questions 67 and 68"	Lamm	Peter Cetera, Lamm	5:03
2.	"Listen"	Lamm	Lamm	3:22
3.	"Poem 58"	Lamm	Lamm	8:35

Side three
No.	Title	Writer(s)	Lead vocals	Length
1.	"Free Form Guitar"	Kath	—	6:47
2.	"South California Purples"	Lamm	Lamm	6:11
3.	"I'm a Man"	Steve Winwood, Jimmy Miller	Lamm, Cetera, Kath	7:43

Side four
No.	Title	Writer(s)	Lead vocals	Length
1.	"Prologue, August 29, 1968 (Note: Recording from the Democratic Convention in Chicago on August 29, 1968, with demonstrators chanting, "The whole world is watching.")"	James William Guercio	—	0:58
2.	"Someday (August 29, 1968)"	James Pankow, Lamm	Lamm, Cetera	4:11
3.	"Liberation"	Pankow	Kath (Note: Briefly near the end: "Oh, thank you people" but otherwise an instrumental)	14:38
Total length:				76:32

== Personnel ==
- Peter Cetera – bass, lead and backing vocals
- Terry Kath – guitars, lead and backing vocals
- Robert Lamm – keyboards, lead and backing vocals
- Lee Loughnane – trumpet, claves, backing vocals
- James Pankow – trombone, cowbell
- Walter Parazaider – saxophone, tambourine, backing vocals
- Danny Seraphine – drums, percussion

=== Production ===
- James William Guercio – producer, original liner notes
- Fred Catero – engineer
- Nick Fasciano – artwork

==== 2002 reissue ====
- Lee Loughnane – A&R, project supervisor
- David McLees – A&R, project supervisor
- Gary Peterson – A&R, project supervisor
- Mike Engstrom – project manager
- April Milek – project assistant
- Bob O'Neill – project assistant
- Ingrid K. Olson – project assistant
- Randy Perry – project assistant
- Steve Woolard – project assistant
- Jeff Magid – audio supervisor
- Cory Frye – editorial supervisor
- Steven Chean – editorial research
- David Donnelly – remastering
- Hugh Brown – photography
- Maria Villar – art direction, design
- David Wild – liner notes

== Charts ==
=== Weekly charts ===
Chart (1969–1971)	Position
Australian Albums (Kent Music Report)	23
Canada Top Albums/CDs (RPM)	10
Dutch Albums (Album Top 100)	6
Norwegian Albums (VG-lista)	8
UK Albums (Official Charts)	9
US Billboard 200	17

=== Year-end charts ===
Chart (1970)	Position
US Billboard 200	23

Chart (1971)	Position
US Billboard 200	15

== Certifications ==
Region	Certification	Certified units/sales
Canada (Music Canada)	Platinum	100,000^{^}
United States (RIAA)	2× Platinum	2,000,000^{^}
^{^} Shipments figures based on certification alone.
