= Beginnings (Chicago song) =

1969 single by Chicago Transit Authority

- Original 1969 single

Single by Chicago Transit Authority

from the album Chicago Transit Authority
- B-side: "Poem 58"; (Original 1969 release); "Colour My World"; (1971 re-release)
- Released: October 28, 1969 June 11, 1971
- Recorded: January 27-30, 1969
- Genre: Pop soul
- Length: 7:54 (album version); 2:47 (single version); 6:26 (Only the Beginning edit)
- Label: Columbia
- Songwriter: Robert Lamm
- Producer: James William Guercio

Chicago Transit Authority singles chronology
"Questions 67 and 68" (1969)	"Beginnings" (1969)	"I’m a Man" (1970)
Lowdown (1971)	Beginnings/Colour My World (1971)	Questions 67 and 68/I'm a Man (1971)

Alternative cover
- 1971 re-release

"Beginnings" is a song written by American rock band Chicago Transit Authority and recorded for its debut album Chicago Transit Authority, released in 1969. It was written by Robert Lamm

The song is the band's second single (after "Questions 67 and 68"), had peaked at position #8 by means of the WNHC hit parade, but did not reach either the Billboard or the Cash Box hit parade on its initial release.

After the band's success with subsequent singles, "Beginnings" was re-released in June 1971, backed with "Colour My World". Both sides became U.S. radio hits, and the combined single climbed to number seven on the U.S. Billboard Hot 100 singles chart. "Beginnings" reached number one on the U.S. Easy Listening chart. Writing for Ultimate Classic Rock, Dave Swanson rates "Beginnings" as number two in his list of top ten Chicago songs. In February 2026, J.S. Gornael, writing for Collider, listed it as the number one "Greatest Romantic Classic Rock Song". It has been covered by many bands.

== Composition ==
Robert Lamm said "Beginnings" was inspired by a performance by Richie Havens that he attended at the Ash Grove music club in Los Angeles when the group moved to that area. In a 2013 interview he said he composed it on a twelve-string guitar that was missing the two low E strings.

== Personnel ==
- Robert Lamm - lead vocals, keyboards
- Terry Kath - 12-string acoustic guitar, backing vocals
- Peter Cetera - bass, backing vocals
- Danny Seraphine - drums, percussion
- Jimmy Pankow - trombone
- Lee Loughnane - trumpet
- Walter Parazaider - alto saxophone

== Charts ==
=== Weekly charts ===
Chart (1971)	Peak position
Canada RPM Top Singles	8
Canada RPM Adult Contemporary	15
U.S. Billboard Hot 100	7
U.S. Billboard Easy Listening	1
U.S. Cash Box Top 100	11

=== Year-end charts ===
Chart (1971)	Rank
Canada RPM Top Singles	53
U.S. Billboard Hot 100	64
U.S. Easy Listening (Billboard)	17
U.S. Cash Box	58
