= I'm a Man (The Spencer Davis Group song) =

1967 single by the Spencer Davis Group

- UK single sleeve

Single by the Spencer Davis Group
- B-side: "I Can't Get Enough of It"
- Released: 20 January 1967
- Genre: Blues rock; British R&B; hard rock; funk; soul
- Length: 2:58
- Label: Fontana (UK); United Artists (US); Stone (Canada)
- Songwriters: Steve Winwood; Jimmy Miller
- Producer: Jimmy Miller

The Spencer Davis Group singles chronology
"Gimme Some Lovin'" (1966)	"I'm a Man" (1967)	"Time Seller" (1967)

"I'm a Man" is a song written by Steve Winwood and record producer Jimmy Miller. It was first recorded in 1967 by British rock band the Spencer Davis Group; Winwood sang lead vocals and played keyboards. The song was a hit in the United Kingdom and the United States, reaching No. 9 and No. 10, respectively. It has been recorded by many other performers over the years, most successfully by American rock band Chicago, whose version charted at No. 8 in the UK in 1970 and No. 49 in the US in 1971.

== Original song ==
The original recording was a Hammond organ-driven blues rock track released as a single by the Spencer Davis Group in early 1967, reaching No. 9 in the UK Singles Chart. In the US, it peaked at No. 10 in the US Billboard Hot 100, as well as No. 48 in the magazine's Top Selling R&B Singles. It was the last hit single by the band before the brothers Steve and Muff Winwood left to pursue their own separate careers. The song is included on the band's 1967 album, I'm a Man.

== Chicago version ==
"I'm a Man"

Single by Chicago Transit Authority

from the album The Chicago Transit Authority
- A-side: "I'm a Man" (Part I) "Questions 67 and 68" (US)
- B-side: "I'm a Man" (Part II)
- Released: January 1970
- Recorded: January 27-30, 1969
- Genre: Hard rock
- Length: 7:43 (album version); 3:27 (single version)
- Label: Columbia
- Songwriters: Steve Winwood; Jimmy Miller
- Producer: James William Guercio

Chicago Transit Authority singles chronology
"Beginnings" (1969)	"I'm a Man" (1970)	"Make Me Smile" (1970)
"Beginnings"/ "Colour My World" (1971)	"Questions 67 and 68" / "I'm a Man" (1971)	"Saturday in the Park" (1972)

American rock band Chicago (then known as Chicago Transit Authority) recorded a cover version of "I'm a Man" (Note: The lyrics to Chicago's version differ considerably from those of the Spencer Davis Group version, likely because the members of Chicago had difficulty understanding the original words. For example, "I'm all hung up on music" from the original became "Never had no problems" in Chicago's cover, while "My toilet's trimmed with chrome" became "My body's pretty strong.") for their 1969 debut album, The Chicago Transit Authority. When the band's popularity surged after their second album, "I'm a Man" was released as the B-side to a re-release of "Questions 67 and 68".

Radio stations ended up playing both sides, and "I'm a Man" reached No. 49 on the US Billboard Hot 100 chart in 1971. It reached No. 8 in the UK and No. 13 in Ireland.

Chicago personnel

- Terry Kath – lead vocals (first verse), backing vocals, guitar
- Peter Cetera – lead vocals (second verse), backing vocals, bass
- Robert Lamm – lead vocals (third verse), backing vocals, keyboards
- Danny Seraphine – drums, maracas
- Jimmy Pankow – cowbell, trombone
- Lee Loughnane – claves, trumpet
- Walt Parazaider – tambourine, tenor saxophone

=== Chart performance ===
Chart (1969–1971)	Peak position
Austria (Ö3 Austria Top 40)	21
Belgium (Ultratop 50 Flanders)	10
Belgium (Ultratop 50 Wallonia)	6
Canada Top Singles (RPM)	8
Netherlands (Single Top 100)	11
Irish Singles Chart	13
UK Singles (Official Charts)	8
US Billboard Hot 100	11
West Germany (GfK)	10

== Other notable versions ==
- Italian-American band Macho recorded a 17-minute disco rendition of the song in 1978, based loosely off of the Chicago arrangement. A shortened version was released as a single, and reached the top 10 of the Billboard Disco Action chart.
- In 1987, Italian producer Gianfranco Bortolotti released a medley under his Club House alias, with "I'm a Man" being mixed with Mory Kanté's "Yé ké yé ké". In 1989 the single was licensed to Music Man Records in the UK and became a minor hit peaking at No. 69 in the British charts.

== VW Polo advertisement ==
Volkswagen aired a UK television commercial titled "Dog" in late winter 2008, which featured a dog miming singing "I'm a Man". The version used in the advertisement for the Polo was a cover version by a young British singer-songwriter, Charlie Winston. The Noam Murro-directed advert received complaints from the RSPCA and over 750 viewers.
