= Free (Chicago song) =

- US picture sleeve

Single by Chicago

from the album Chicago III
- B-side: "Free Country"
- Released: February 8, 1971
- Recorded: 1970
- Genre: Rock, jazz rock, funk rock
- Length: 2:16
- Label: Columbia
- Songwriter: Robert Lamm
- Producer: James William Guercio

Chicago singles chronology
"Does Anybody Really Know What Time It Is?" (1970)	"Free" (1971)	"Lowdown" (1971)

"Free" is a song written by Robert Lamm as a part of the "Travel Suite" for the rock band Chicago and recorded for their third album Chicago III (1971), with Terry Kath singing lead vocals. It was the first single released from this album, and peaked at #20 on the U.S. Billboard Hot 100.

Record World said that it "features the driving horn rock sound that drives [Chicago's] fans, of all ages, out of their minds." Cash Box called it a "mighty brass and percussion effort."

== Personnel ==
- Terry Kath – lead vocals, guitar
- Robert Lamm – keyboards, backing vocals
- Peter Cetera – bass, backing vocals
- Danny Seraphine – drums, percussion
- James Pankow – trombone
- Lee Loughnane – trumpet
- Walter Parazaider – alto saxophone
