= Colour My World (Chicago song) =

- US picture sleeve

Single by Chicago

from the album Chicago
- A-side: "Make Me Smile" (1970); "Beginnings" (1971)
- Released: March 1970; June 1971
- Genre: Soft rock
- Length: 2:59
- Label: Columbia
- Songwriter: James Pankow
- Producer: James William Guercio

Chicago singles chronology
"Beginnings" (1969)	"Colour My World" (1970)	"25 or 6 to 4" (1970)
Lowdown (1971)	Beginnings/Colour My World (1971)	Questions 67 and 68/I'm a Man (1971)

"Colour My World" is a song written by American musician James Pankow, one of the founding members of the rock/jazz fusion band Chicago. Part of Pankow's "Ballet for a Girl in Buchannon" song cycle/suite, it was recorded for their second album Chicago, also called Chicago II (1970). Terry Kath sings the lead vocal, and Walter Parazaider performs a flute solo.

The song was initially released as the B-side to "Make Me Smile" in March 1970. It was re-released in June 1971 as the B-side to the re-release of "Beginnings"; this second single reached No. 7 on the U.S. Billboard Hot 100.

"Colour My World" is the first significant hit by Chicago to largely abstain from their heavy woodwind and brass oriented sound. It became a popular "slow dance" song at high school proms, university dances and weddings during the 1970s.

Chicago continues to perform the song, either on its own, or as part of the Ballet. Since Kath's death in 1978 and being brought back into their set list in 1982, lead vocals were performed by Bill Champlin until 1991, when Robert Lamm took the lead. It has been sung by trumpeter Lee Loughnane since 2009.

Frank Sinatra wanted to record a version of the song on the condition that Pankow write an additional verse. Pankow declined the offer. The song contains one verse and a flute solo.

== Personnel ==
- Terry Kath – lead vocals
- Robert Lamm – piano and organ
- Peter Cetera – bass
- Danny Seraphine – drums
- Walter Parazaider – flute

== Certifications ==
Region	Certification	Certified units/sales
Canada (Music Canada)	Gold	75,000^{^}
^{^} Shipments figures based on certification alone.
