= Terry Kath =

American guitarist and singer (1946–1978)

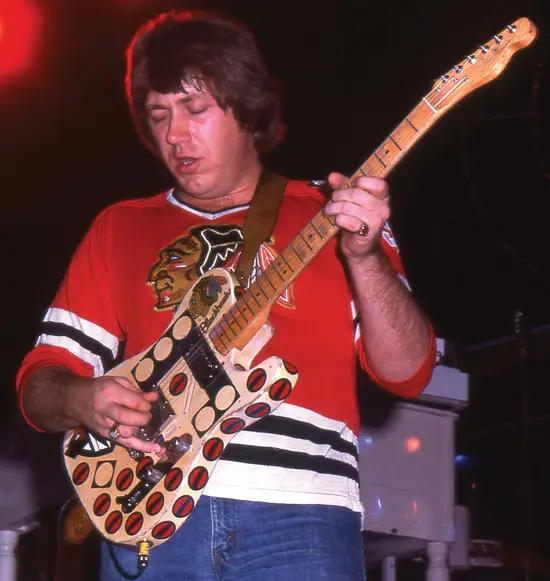
- Kath wearing a Chicago Blackhawks hockey jersey in 1975.

Background information
- Born: Terry Alan Kath; January 31, 1946; Chicago, Illinois, U.S.
- Died: January 23, 1978 (aged 31) Woodland Hills, Los Angeles, California, U.S.
- Genres: Rock, hard rock, blues rock, jazz rock
- Occupations: Musician; songwriter
- Instruments: Guitar; vocals; bass
- Years active: 1963–1978
- Formerly of: Chicago
- Spouse(s): Pamela Robinson (m. 1970; div. 1975) Camelia Ortiz (m. 1976)
- Website: terrykath.com

Terry Alan Kath (January 31, 1946 – January 23, 1978) was an American guitarist and singer who is best known as a founding member of the rock band Chicago. He played lead guitar and sang lead vocals on many of the band's early hit singles alongside Robert Lamm and Peter Cetera. He has been praised by his bandmates and other musicians for his guitar skills and his Ray Charles–influenced vocal style. Jimi Hendrix cited Kath as one of his favorite guitarists and considered him to be "the best guitarist in the universe."

Growing up in a musical family, Kath took up a variety of instruments in his teens, including the drums and banjo. He played bass in a number of local bands throughout the mid-1960s, gaining experience in various musical styles and group settings. As his musical direction evolved, he eventually transitioned to the guitar, which became his primary instrument by the time he co-founded the band that would later be known as Chicago. His dynamic and expressive guitar playing, which blended elements of rock, jazz, and blues, quickly became a central component of the group’s sound. From the band’s earliest recordings, his contributions helped define their musical identity and set them apart from other rock acts of the era.

He used a number of different guitars, but eventually became identified with a Fender Telecaster fitted with a single neck-position humbucker pickup combined with a bridge position angled single-coil pickup and decorated with numerous stickers.

Kath struggled with health issues and substance abuse in the late 1970s. In January 1978, he died from an unintentional self-inflicted gunshot wound to the head. His death led the members of Chicago to consider disbanding; however, they ultimately chose to continue. Their decision to move forward was reflected in the memorial song "Alive Again." To commemorate his musicianship, they issued the 1997 album The Innovative Guitar of Terry Kath. In 2016, Kath's daughter Michelle Sinclair released the documentary The Terry Kath Experience, which chronicles his life and Chicago's early years.

== Early life ==
Kath was born to Raymond Elmer "Ray" Kath (1912–2003) and Evelyn Meline (née Haugen) Kath (1916–1982) on January 31, 1946, in Chicago. He had an older brother, Rod Kath, was raised in the Norwood Park neighborhood of Chicago, and attended Taft High School.

His brother played the drums and his mother played the banjo, and Kath attempted to learn these instruments too. He acquired a guitar and amplifier when he was in the ninth grade, and his early influences included The Ventures, Johnny Smith, Dick Dale, and Howard Roberts. He was later influenced by George Benson, Kenny Burrell, Mike Bloomfield, Eric Clapton, and Jimi Hendrix.

Unlike several other Chicago members who received formal music training, Kath was mostly self-taught and enjoyed jamming. In a 1971 interview for Guitar Player, he said he had tried professional lessons but abandoned them, adding "All I wanted to do was play those rock and roll chords." His father wanted him to have a steady career, but he decided he would prefer a career in music.

== Career ==
=== Early career ===
Kath in 1969

Terry Kath joined his first semi-professional band, The Mystics, in 1963, moving to Jimmy Rice and the Gentlemen in 1965. He then played bass in a road band called Jimmy Ford and the Executives. Considered to be the bandleader, Kath guided the band's musical direction. Ford was the trumpeter, Walter Parazaider played saxophone and other wind instruments, and Danny Seraphine later became the drummer. Kath became close friends with Seraphine and Parazaider. The three musicians regularly socialized outside of the band. They were fired from the group, which wanted to merge with another band, Little Artie and the Pharaohs, while leader and guitarist Mike Sistack explained that "it's just business."

In 1966, Kath joined a cover band called the Missing Links, taking Parazaider and Seraphine with him, and started playing clubs and ballrooms in Chicago on a regular basis. Parazaider's friend at De Paul University, trumpeter Lee Loughnane, also sat in with the band from time to time. Kath's compatriot James William Guercio (who later became Chicago's producer) was lead guitarist in one of two road bands performing on The Dick Clark Show with the Missing Links. Kath received an offer from Guercio to play bass for the Illinois Speed Press and move to Los Angeles, but declined as he considered the guitar his main instrument and wanted to sing lead. He stayed with Parazaider, Seraphine, and Loughnane instead, who quickly recruited trombonist James Pankow from De Paul and vocalist/keyboardist Robert Lamm. Kath sang the lower range of lead vocals in the group in a style reminiscent of Ray Charles. The group practiced at Parazaider's parents' basement and changed its name to The Big Thing. With the addition of singer and bassist Peter Cetera of The Exceptions, they moved to Los Angeles and signed with Columbia Records, renaming the band Chicago Transit Authority. The real Chicago Transit Authority objected to the band's use of the name so in mid-1969 the name was shortened to Chicago.

=== Chicago ===
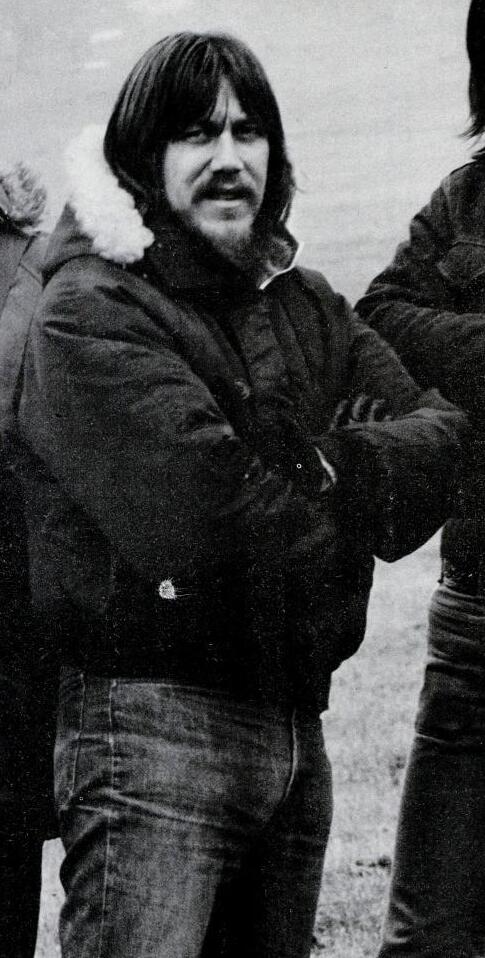
Kath in 1973.

Kath was regarded as Chicago's bandleader and best soloist; his vocal, jazz and hard rock influences are regarded as integral to the band's early sound. He has been praised for his guitar skills and described by rock author Corbin Reiff as "one of the most criminally underrated guitarists to have ever set finger to fretboard". According to Loughnane, Kath could sing a lead vocal and play lead and rhythm guitar simultaneously.

The group's first album, Chicago Transit Authority, released in 1969, includes Kath's composition "Introduction", described as "Terry's masterpiece" by later Chicago guitarist Dawayne Bailey. The song displays many varied musical styles, including jazz, blues, salsa, rock and roll, acid rock, and pop. The same debut album includes an instrumental guitar piece titled "Free Form Guitar", which consisted largely of feedback and heavy use of the Stratocaster's tremolo arm. The album liner notes indicate that the nearly seven-minute piece was recorded live in the studio in one take, using only a Fender Dual Showman amplifier pre-amped with a Bogen Challenger P.A. amp. The guitar's neck was held together with a radiator hose clamp. The song "Beginnings" includes acoustic rhythm guitar by Kath.

For the group's second album, Kath contributed an extended guitar solo on "25 or 6 to 4", which became a live favorite. The same album saw Kath collaborate with orchestral arranger Peter Matz on the four-part suite "Memories of Love", singing the lead vocal. Kath wrote at least one song and contributed at least one lead vocal to every Chicago album released during his lifetime. While 1976's Chicago X is best known for Cetera's number one hit, "If You Leave Me Now", Kath's "Once or Twice" showed he was still writing and recording rock material. He continued this style on the following year's Chicago XI, contributing the funky "Mississippi Delta City Blues" and the aggressive "Takin' It on Uptown", which counterbalanced some of the material other members were producing.

After his death, to memorialize Kath and to commemorate the resumption of Chicago, Donnie Dacus replaced him and the band composed and published the song "Alive Again" on its first album without him, Hot Streets. Also in Kath's honor, they later published the song "Feel the Spirit".

== Equipment ==
Kath used several guitars in his early career, but many of these early ones were stolen while on the road. His first main instrument that he used when Chicago were still The Big Thing was a Register guitar that cost $80. When the band started becoming successful, he traded up to a Fender Stratocaster. He also used a Gibson SG Standard, as pictured on Chicago Transit Authority's inner sleeve, and a Gibson SG Custom, and was one of the few well-known guitarists to make regular use of the 1969 Les Paul "Professional" model, which sported a pair of unconventional low-impedance pickups with a special impedance-matching transformer for use with a standard high impedance-input amplifier. Kath tended to favor light strings, though for the top E string, he used one from a tenor guitar. In an interview with Guitar Player, he said that he used the tenor guitar string for the top E and moved all the regular strings down (top E was used as B, B used as a G, and so forth). For acoustic parts, he played an Ovation acoustic guitar.

In the latter part of his career, he favored a Fender Telecaster, which he heavily modified. The standard blonde Telecaster had its black pickguard and its neck-position pickup removed, and the hole enlarged and fitted with a Gibson humbucker. The guitar control plate was also reversed. He was an early investor in the Pignose company (a manufacturer of guitar amplifiers) and served in the management of the company and decorated his Telecaster with 25 Pignose stickers, a Maico motorcycles decal and a Chicago Blackhawks logo. Most of Kath's guitars had gone missing for many years, including the famous "Pignose" Telecaster. Several were located by Kath's daughter Michelle Kath Sinclair, at the home of her step-grandmother, during her research for the documentary film Chicago: The Terry Kath Experience. Among the re-discovered equipment was his "Pignose" Telecaster, an Ovation acoustic, a Fender Stratocaster, and a Gibson SG Custom with the pickups removed.

Kath experimented with a wide variety of amplification and distortion devices and used a wah-wah pedal frequently. Fascinated by gadgets, Kath was interested in trying to play guitar without using a pick. Lamm recalled him attempting to make an auto-picking device using a modified electrical cocktail mixer.

== Vocals ==
Kath sang lead vocals on several of Chicago's early songs, including "I'm a Man" (Chicago Transit Authority), "Colour My World", "Make Me Smile" (both part of "Ballet for a Girl in Buchannon"), "Movin' In", and "In The Country" (Chicago II), "Free" (Chicago III), "Dialogue (Part I & II)" (Chicago V), "Wishing You Were Here" (Chicago VII), and "Brand New Love Affair" (Chicago VIII). His vocal delivery was later described by Lamm as "The White Ray Charles". Pankow, who wrote "Make Me Smile", tried rehearsing the song with various members singing lead, but ultimately settled on Kath, saying "bingo – 'that' was the voice." Kath was one of the three primary lead singers of Chicago, with a vocal range between those of the other two, Peter Cetera's higher tenor and Robert Lamm's fuller, lower baritone. He often collaborated with Cetera on lead vocals as they did in "Dialogue (Part I & II)," "Ain't It Blue," "In The Country," and "Brand New Love Affair".

Kath also played lead guitar and sang lead vocals on the closing song "Tell Me" in the 1973 drama movie Electra Glide in Blue. The song was used in the final episode of the television series Miami Vice.

== Personal life and death ==
Kath had a self-admitted history of drug abuse, including alcohol. Seraphine knew that Kath had a high tolerance for drugs and he later recalled Kath telling him: "I'm going to get things under control ... if I don't, this stuff is going to kill me." Chicago bandmates, including Seraphine, had noted that he was then also becoming increasingly unhappy. The night before he died, Kath visited bandmate Laudir de Oliveira. De Oliveira offered him tea and the two spent all night talking. Guercio has said that Kath was finishing writing a solo album before he died and Pankow has adamantly denied that Kath was suicidal.

Kath enjoyed target shooting; and by 1978, he was regularly carrying guns. On Monday, January 23, after a party at the home of roadie and band technician Don Johnson in Woodland Hills, Los Angeles, California, Kath began to play with his guns. He spun his unloaded .38 revolver on his finger, put it to his temple and pulled the trigger. Johnson warned Kath several times to be careful. Kath picked up a semi-automatic 9 mm pistol and, leaning back in a chair, said to Johnson: "Don't worry about it ... Look, the clip is not even in it." His last words were, "What do you think I'm gonna do? Blow my brains out?" To calm Johnson's concerns, Kath showed him the empty magazine. Kath then replaced the magazine in the gun, put the gun to his temple and pulled the trigger. Apparently unbeknownst to Kath, the gun had a round in the chamber. He died instantly from the gunshot.

Kath left behind his wife, Camelia Ortiz, and a 20-month-old daughter, Michelle Kath (now Michelle Kath Sinclair since her marriage to actor Adam Sinclair).

Kath is interred near his mother, Evelyn Kath, and father, Raymond Kath, in the Forest Lawn Memorial Park Cemetery in Glendale, California in the Gardens of Remembrance.

The group's members were devastated over losing Kath and strongly considered disbanding but were persuaded by Doc Severinsen, musical director of the Tonight Show band, to continue. Kath's position as guitarist in Chicago was filled by Donnie Dacus. At Chicago concerts, members Lee Loughnane (trumpet) and Robert Lamm (keyboards) have performed lead vocals originally sung by Kath.

== Legacy ==
I don't think there's ever been a better rhythm player. And then, Terry's leads are, for that day especially, world class stuff.

— Chicago keyboardist Robert Lamm

Because Chicago considered themselves a team, some band members have subsequently claimed Kath's contributions to be generally overlooked. Chicago band member Walter Parazaider later said, "If [Kath] was totally up front, he would have gotten a lot more recognition." According to Parazaider, Jimi Hendrix commented to him after a set at the Whisky a Go Go in Los Angeles that "your guitar player is better than me."

In September 1997, Chicago released Chicago Presents The Innovative Guitar of Terry Kath, a CD remembrance of their late guitarist, on their own short-lived Chicago Records label.

Band members have since wondered if Kath would have stayed with Chicago had he lived or started a solo career. In 2010, Parazaider said:

"I'm not sure about that. [Terry] was a free spirit ... He was his own person when it came to different things. I would like to think he (would still be with Chicago) but he was very independent and I wonder what he would have thought about the 1980s. I'd have to say it's 50/50. It could have gone either way."

In 2012, Kath's daughter Michelle Kath Sinclair announced that enough funds had been donated to complete production on a documentary of his life, titled Searching for Terry: Discovering a Guitar Legend. In 2014, she confirmed she had interviewed the entire band except for Cetera and the project was planned for release in 2016. The film made its world premiere at the 2016 Toronto International Film Festival, renamed as The Terry Kath Experience, and Peter Cetera was listed among the cast members. It made its United States premiere at the DOC NYC film festival in November 2016 under the same name, and was soon after acquired by FilmRise, which planned a 2017 release. The film made its television premiere on AXS TV, under the name Chicago: The Terry Kath Experience, on November 7, 2017, and it was released as VOD and DVD on December 12. The film includes interviews with guitarists Jeff Lynne, Steve Lukather, Mike Campbell, Dean DeLeo and Joe Walsh, who all praised Kath's work. Walsh said, "He was a great guy; he was a brilliant musician. He was a songwriter and a great singer. He was such a monster on guitar. ... He was just a total experimenter".

On April 8, 2016, Chicago was inducted into the Rock and Roll Hall of Fame. Michelle Kath Sinclair accepted the award on her father's behalf.

== Discography with Chicago ==
- 1969 Chicago Transit Authority
- 1970 Chicago
- 1971 Chicago III
- 1971 Chicago at Carnegie Hall
- 1972 Chicago V
- 1973 Chicago VI
- 1974 Chicago VII
- 1975 Chicago VIII
- 1976 Chicago X
- 1977 Chicago XI
- 1997 Chicago Presents the Innovative Guitar of Terry Kath
- 2011 Chicago XXXIV: Live in '75
