= Danny Seraphine =

American drummer (b. 1948)

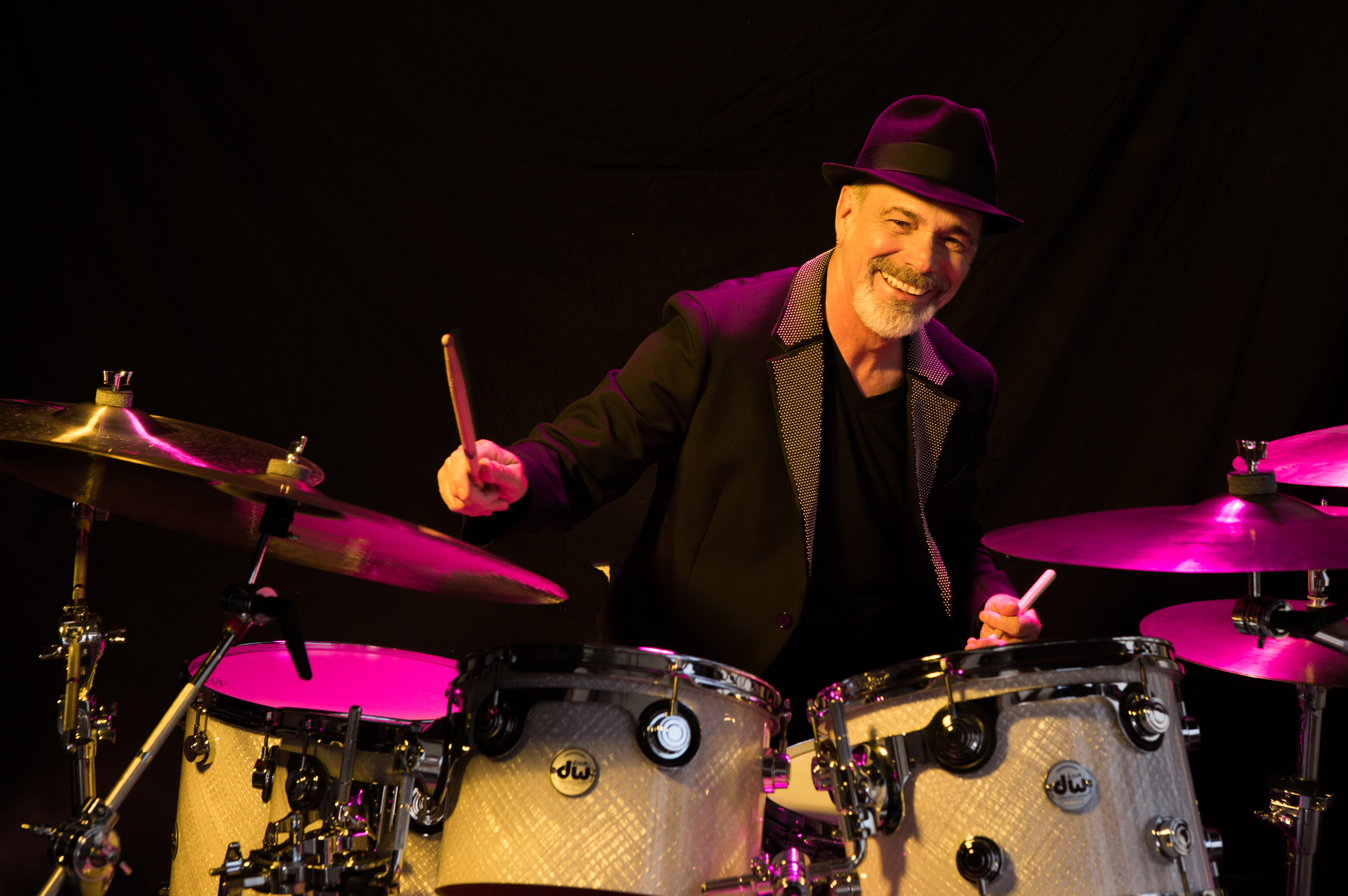
- Seraphine in 2016

Background information
- Born: Daniel Peter Seraphine; August 28, 1948 (age 78); Chicago, Illinois, U.S.
- Genres: Rock, jazz
- Instruments: Drums, percussion
- Years active: 1967–1990, 2006–present
- Website: www.dannyseraphine.com

Daniel Peter Seraphine (born August 28, 1948) is an American drummer, record producer, theatrical producer, and film producer. He is best known as the original drummer and a founding member of the rock band Chicago, a tenure which lasted from February 1967 to May 1990.

Seraphine co-wrote several charting singles for the band, including "Lowdown", "Little One", "Take Me Back to Chicago", "No Tell Lover", and "Thunder and Lightning". His song "Street Player", which was also used as the title of his 2011 autobiography, was also sampled by Kenny Dope on "The Bomb! (These Sounds Fall into My Mind)" and later incorporated into "I Know You Want Me (Calle Ocho)" by Pitbull via a sample from the song "75, Brazil Street".

== Early life ==
Seraphine was born in Chicago to John and Mary Seraphine. The family lived in the Dunning neighborhood on Chicago's northwest side. He started playing drums at the age of nine while attending St. Priscilla Catholic grade school. When he was 15 years old, Seraphine withdrew from Steinmetz High School. Outside of school he joined a local gang called the JPs.

In December 1965, after deciding to quit as a professional drummer, he was invited to join Jimmy Ford and the Executives, Dick Clark's road band. Already in the band were Terry Kath on bass and Walter Parazaider on saxophone. After being let go from Jimmy Ford and the Executives when it merged with another local band, Little Artie and the Pharaohs (under the new name the Mob) the three of them were invited to join a cover band named the Missing Links.

He studied privately with percussionist Bob Tilles at DePaul University, where future members of the band Chicago were also studying. Seraphine cites his influences as Gene Krupa, Buddy Rich, Tony Williams, Elvin Jones, Grady Tate, Max Roach, Ringo Starr, Mitch Mitchell, Ginger Baker, Jeff Porcaro, Steve Gadd, Bernard Purdie, John Robinson, and Hal Blaine.

He continued his education with big band drummer Chuck Flores, followed by two years of study under jazz drummer Jo Jones (also known as Papa Jo Jones) in the mid-1970s.

== Chicago Transit Authority ==
Early in 1967, Seraphine approached his two new friends Walter Parazaider (saxophone and woodwinds) and Terry Kath about leaving the cover band they were in and starting a new band with a horn section. Kath switched from bass to guitar, his first love. After the addition of Lee Loughnane (trumpet), James Pankow (trombone), Robert Lamm (keyboards) and Peter Cetera (bass), the band began performing initially as a cover band called The Big Thing (sometimes called The Big Sound), before settling on Chicago Transit Authority, which was soon shortened to Chicago because of threatened legal action by the actual Chicago Transit Authority.

== Chicago ==
Their producer and manager James William Guercio moved the group to Los Angeles, where they landed a regular gig at the Whisky a Go Go. They subsequently obtained a contract with Columbia Records and recorded their first album — a double album — in two weeks. This eponymous album Chicago Transit Authority was released in 1969. Second only to the Beach Boys in terms of Billboard singles and albums chart success among American bands, Chicago is one of the longest-running and most successful pop and rock groups.

Seraphine co-wrote several songs for the band: "Lowdown" (a Top 40 hit for the band); the instrumentals "Prelude to Aire", "Aire", and "Devil's Sweet" from the album Chicago VII; "Little One" and "Take Me Back to Chicago" from Chicago XI; "Greatest Love on Earth" from Hot Streets; "Street Player" from Chicago 13; "Thunder and Lightning" and "Birthday Boy" from Chicago XIV; and "Sonny Think Twice" from Chicago 16. His writing partner was often David "Hawk" Wolinski, the keyboardist for Rufus featuring Chaka Khan although Seraphine has occasionally co-written with other members of the band like Peter Cetera, Robert Lamm and Bill Champlin. In 1995 "Street Player" was sampled by The Bucketheads for the dance hit "The Bomb! (These Sounds Fall into My Mind)", and later by rapper Pitbull for the hit "I Know You Want Me (Calle Ocho)" from the album "Rebelution". The song samples "75, Brazil Street" by Nicola Fasano versus Pat Rich, which itself samples "Street Player". "I Know You Want Me" has also been featured in Dance Central, the dancing game for Kinect, Dance Dance Revolution X2 for PlayStation 2, and SingStar Dance, the dancing game for PlayStation Move.

Seraphine and Wolinski also started a production company called Street Sense. Seraphine used his home studio to record demos. A deal was signed with Epic Records with the idea of fostering new talent.

In 1974, during the peak of the band's career, Seraphine co-founded B'Ginnings, a music venue with capacity of almost 1,000, in the northwest suburbs of Chicago.

Seraphine was let go from Chicago in May 1990, after disagreements with the band that were chronicled in his book Street Player: My Chicago Story. After his departure, veteran session drummer Tris Imboden joined the band in time for Twenty 1.

== California Transit Authority ==
In early 2006, after about 15 years of hiatus from actively playing music, Danny Seraphine debuted a new band, California Transit Authority (CTA), featuring himself on drums, Marc Bonilla on lead guitar, Mick Mahan on bass guitar, Ed Roth and Peter Fish on keyboards, Mike Wallace on guitar, and Tower of Power singer Larry Braggs on vocals. Seraphine and Bonilla initially put the band together to play charity benefit shows. Their repertoire included several Chicago songs. The response from the public was strong enough to persuade Seraphine to continue and write original material with the other band members. Bill Champlin's son, Will Champlin, later joined the band as vocalist.

CTA released their first studio album, Full Circle, on August 14, 2007, followed by a tour of the United States. The band's second album Sacred Ground was released on March 21, 2013. Former Chicago members like Bill Champlin, Jeff Coffey, Donnie Dacus and Laudir de Oliveira occasionally sat in with the band. In 2022, Coffey joined the band on a permanent basis.

The current lineup (as of 2023) consists of Seraphine, Coffey, and Bonilla, as well as Travis Davis (bass/vocals), Ed Roth (keyboards), and Jeff Kashiwa (saxophone).

== Other activities ==
2009 saw the release of Lonely Street, a film for which Seraphine served as an executive producer and the music supervisor. In 2010 he published his aforementioned autobiography Street Player: My Chicago Story. In the same year, he released the biographical and instructional DVD "The Art of Jazz Rock Drumming" produced by The Drum Channel.

== Awards and achievements ==
Seraphine has been ranked by Rolling Stone magazine as one of the top 100 drummers of all time. In 2010, Seraphine received a Lifetime Achievement Award at the Cape Breton Drum Festival. In 2011, he also won a Lifetime Achievement Award, Montreal Drum Festival. Additionally, he was recognized by the ASCAP as a co-writer of Pitbull's "I Know You Want Me (Calle Ocho)".

On May 9, 2015, the City of Chicago dedicated the 3500 block of North Normandy Avenue on Chicago's northwest side "Honorary Danny Seraphine Way".

Seraphine was inducted into the Rock and Roll Hall of Fame as a member of Chicago on April 8, 2016. He was named a Goodwill Ambassador by the Asian Hall of Fame in 2021.

He received a Recording Academy Lifetime Achievement Award at the 63RD ANNUAL GRAMMY AWARDS (2020)

== Endorsements ==
Seraphine plays Slingerland drums, DW pedals & hardware, Aquarian drumheads, Zildjian cymbals and drumsticks.

With Chicago, Seraphine used Rogers and Slingerland drums; and in the 1970s, he used an array of Slingerland drum kits in both recording and touring and in a variety of configurations. He switched to Yamaha Drums around 1984 before the departure of singer and bassist Peter Cetera. In 1988, he switched to DW, playing their drums until 2025, and still using their pedals and hardware to this day. He had previously used Pro-Mark drumsticks, but eventually switched to using Danny Seraphine signature drumsticks, a line created for him by Zildjian, and for many years, he used Remo heads. In October 2025, Seraphine returned to Slingerland drums.
