= Walter Parazaider =

American woodwind musician (1945–2026)

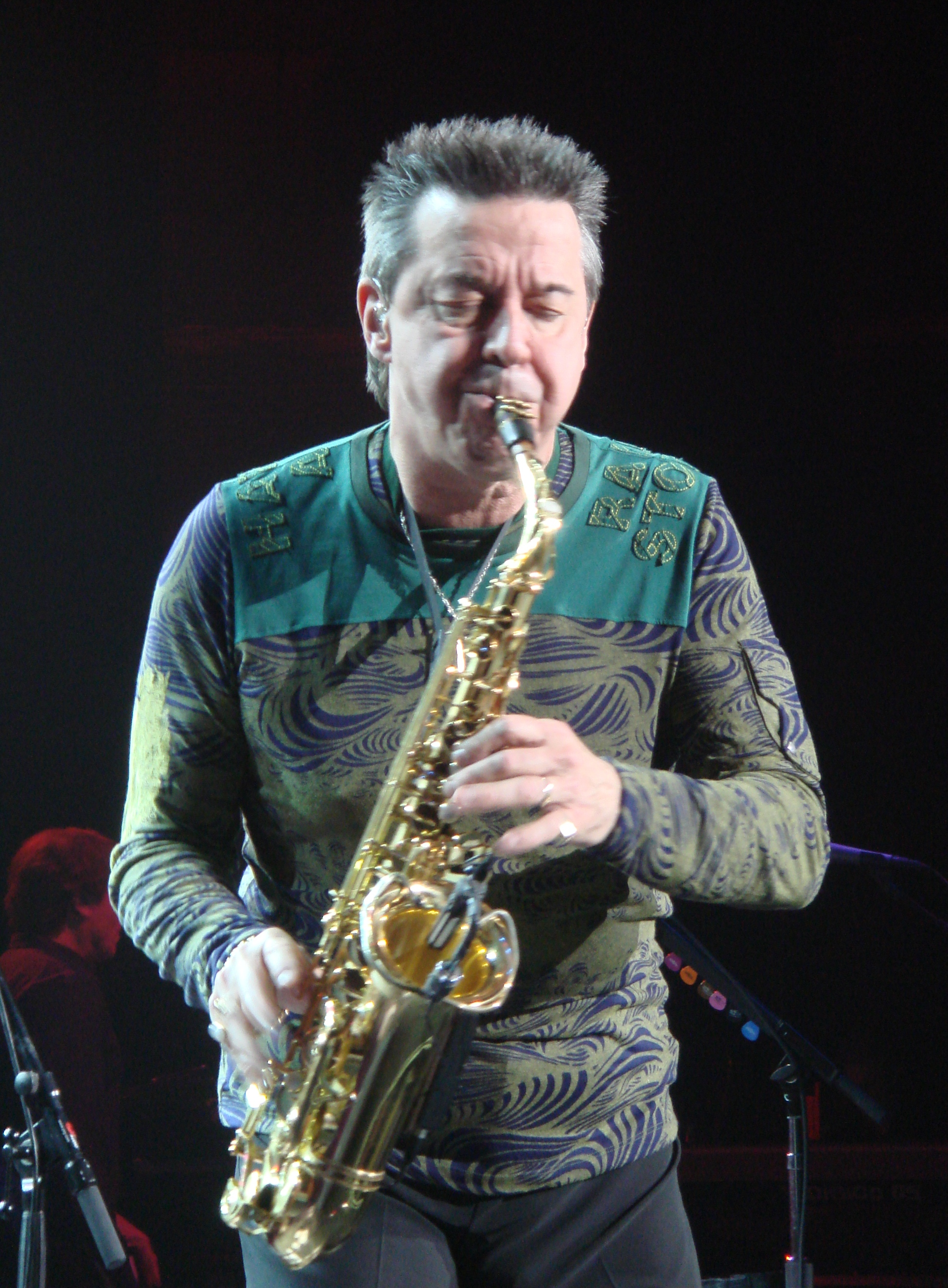
- Parazaider in 2008

Background information
- Born: March 14, 1945; Maywood, Illinois, U.S.
- Died: June 17, 2026 (aged 81) Henderson, Nevada, U.S.
- Genres: Rock; blues; R&B; jazz fusion
- Occupation: Musician
- Instruments: Saxophone; flute; clarinet; guitar
- Years active: 1966–2017
- Formerly of: Chicago
- Spouse: JacLynn Bryce Goudie (m. 1966)

Walter Joseph Parazaider (/pærəˈzeɪdər/; March 14, 1945 – June 17, 2026) was an American woodwind musician who was a founding member of the rock band Chicago. He was best known for being one-third of Chicago's brass and woodwind section alongside Lee Loughnane and James Pankow. Parazaider played saxophone, flute, and clarinet, and occasionally played guitar as well.

== Early life ==
Parazaider, who is of Croatian heritage, was born in Maywood, Illinois, on March 14, 1945, and began playing the clarinet at the age of nine. As a teenager, his growing talent was being groomed for a career as a professional orchestral musician, and he earned a Bachelor of Arts degree in classical clarinet performance from DePaul University.

== Career ==
Inspired by the Beatles hit "Got to Get You Into My Life", Parazaider became enamored of the idea of creating a rock 'n' roll band with horns. Early practice sessions at Parazaider's house included guitarist Terry Kath and drummer Danny Seraphine, who were both friends during his teenage years. Another friend who became involved was future Chicago producer James William Guercio.

=== Chicago ===
The band, originally called The Big Thing, eventually became Chicago with the addition of Lee Loughnane on trumpet, James Pankow on trombone, Robert Lamm on keyboards, and Peter Cetera on bass. Parazaider's primary musical role in the band has consisted of playing woodwinds on James Pankow's horn arrangements. Never a prolific writer, Parazaider's compositional contributions ("It Better End Soon: 2nd Movement", "Free Country", "Aire", "Devil's Sweet", "Window Dreamin'") were few relative to the other members.

Parazaider performed the highly recognizable flute solo in the Chicago hit "Colour My World", which became a popular 'slow dance' song at high school proms during the 1970s. The band's 1973 hit "Just You 'n' Me" also features a Parazaider solo, on soprano sax.

In 2008, he was awarded an honorary Doctor of Humane Letters by DePaul University.

He was also a member of Phi Mu Alpha Sinfonia and was given the National Citation, being recognized as Signature Sinfonian along with fellow Chicago members and Sinfonians on August 26, 2009.

A member of Chicago from its inception, Parazaider continued to tour extensively with the band until his retirement from touring in 2017 due to a heart condition. He is now included on the band's "Tribute to Founding Members" page alongside Kath, Seraphine, and Cetera (by accounts, Cetera was not a founding member; joining the band about eight months later).

== Personal life and death ==
Parazaider married JacLynn Bryce Goudie in 1966. They had two daughters.

In April 2021, four years after his retirement from touring with Chicago, Parazaider announced that he had been diagnosed with Alzheimer's disease. When asked about Parazaider's health in April 2026, Lee Loughnane said "I don't think he's doing well".

Parazaider died of complications from Alzheimer's disease under hospice care, on June 17, 2026, at the age of 81.
