= James Pankow =

American trombone player and songwriter (born 1947)

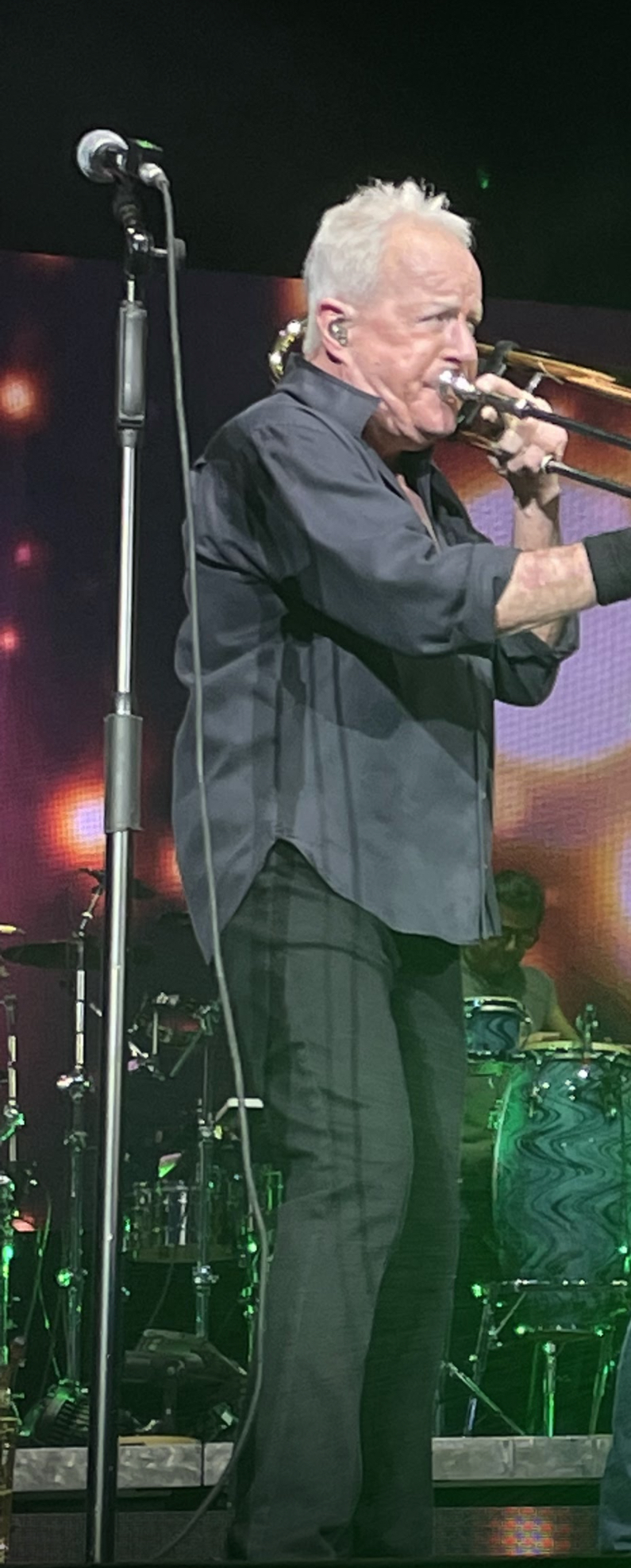
- Pankow in 2022

Background information
- Born: James Carter Pankow; August 20, 1947 (age 79); St. Louis, Missouri, United States
- Genres: Rock, adult contemporary, jazz
- Occupations: Musician, songwriter, arranger
- Instruments: Trombone; vocals; keyboards; percussion
- Years active: 1967–present
- Member of: Chicago

James Carter Pankow (born August 20, 1947) is an American trombone player, songwriter, and a founding member of the rock band Chicago.

He is known for his brass arrangements, and for being one-third of Chicago's brass/woodwind section (alongside Lee Loughnane and Walter Parazaider), as well as a backing and occasional lead vocalist.

== Early life, family and education ==
Born in St. Louis, Missouri, of German and Irish descent, Pankow was one of nine siblings. He is the older brother of actor John Pankow, who appeared on the TV series Mad About You. The family moved to Park Ridge, Illinois, when he was eight years old.

Pankow was influenced by his musician father, Wayne. He started playing the trombone at St. Paul of the Cross Elementary School. His Notre Dame High School band instructor was Father George Wiskirchen, CSC.

Pankow earned a full music scholarship to Quincy College, where he studied the bass trombone. After completing his first year, he returned home for the summer and formed a band that began to play some live local shows. Not wanting to give up this work, Pankow transferred to DePaul University.

He is a member of Phi Mu Alpha Sinfonia, and he was given the National Citation as well as recognition as Signature Sinfonian along with fellow Chicago members and Sinfonians on August 26, 2009.

== Career ==
=== Chicago ===
At DePaul, Pankow met Walter Parazaider, who recruited him to join a band, The Big Thing, which would become Chicago Transit Authority. Soon after the first album's release, the band's name was shortened to Chicago. Pankow has remained a member of Chicago since its inception.

In addition to playing the trombone, Pankow has composed many songs for Chicago, including the hits "Make Me Smile" and "Colour My World" (both from his suite Ballet for a Girl in Buchannon), "Just You 'N' Me," "(I've Been) Searchin' So Long," "Old Days," "Alive Again," and (with Peter Cetera) "Feelin' Stronger Every Day."

Pankow has scored most of Chicago's brass arrangements. Although he is not one of the band's principal vocalists, he sang lead vocals for two Chicago songs: "You Are on My Mind" (from Chicago X, 1976) and "Till the End of Time" (Chicago XI, 1977).

In 2025, both Pankow and fellow bandmate Robert Lamm stopped touring with the band due to health problems, but have not retired and remain band members.

=== Other ===
Along with fellow Chicago horns Lee Loughnane and Walter Parazaider, Pankow was featured on Three Dog Night's 1969 #15 hit "Celebrate" and on several tracks of the 1979 Bee Gees' Spirits Having Flown album. Pankow has appeared on several albums for the rock band Toto, including the 1982 Grammy Award-winning Toto IV and their 2006 album Falling in Between, for which he composed the brass arrangements and performed on the song "Dying on My Feet".

== Personal life ==
Pankow and his first wife Karen were married for 18 years. Their children are Jonathan (born 1981) and Sarah (born 1986).

Pankow and his second wife Jeanne Pacelli have two children, Carter (born 1999) and Lilli (born 2002).
