= The Box (box set) =

Box set by Chicago
- Released: July 22, 2003
- Recorded: January 1969–1998
- Genres: Rock; hard rock; pop rock
- Length: 392:55
- Label: Rhino Records
- Producers: James William Guercio; Phil Ramone; Chicago; Tom Dowd; David Foster; Ron Nevison; Chas Sandford; Bruce Fairbairn; Lenny Kravitz; James Newton Howard; Roy Bittan

Chicago chronology
| The Very Best of Chicago: Only the Beginning (2002) | The Box (2003) | Love Songs (2005) |

Professional ratings
Review scores
| Source | Rating |
|---|---|
| AllMusic | 4.5/5 stars |

The Box is a five-CD/one DVD career-spanning box set by the popular American group Chicago, compiled and released by Rhino Records in 2003. It is the band's twenty-eighth canon release; the members of Chicago helped choose the material from their entire back catalogue.

The box includes material from every studio album released by the band since its 1969 debut, Chicago Transit Authority, to its late 1990s recordings, along with a few rarities, notably three songs from the then-unreleased 1993 Stone of Sisyphus project. Every charting single from 1969 to 2003 is included, with the exception of the 1986 remake of the band's earlier hit, "25 or 6 to 4".

An additional DVD features rare live recordings from 1972 and promotional material for 1979's Chicago 13. The set also includes a booklet of additional material featuring track-by-track analysis, promotional photos, essays and variations on the familiar Chicago logo.

== Track listing ==
Disc one
| No. | Title | Writer(s) | Original album | Length |
|---|---|---|---|---|
| 1. | "Introduction" | Terry Kath | Chicago Transit Authority, 1969 | 6:35 |
| 2. | "Does Anybody Really Know What Time It Is?" (Single version) | Robert Lamm | Chicago Transit Authority | 3:20 |
| 3. | "Beginnings" (GH edit) | Lamm | Chicago Transit Authority | 6:27 |
| 4. | "Questions 67 and 68" | Lamm | Chicago Transit Authority | 5:01 |
| 5. | "Listen" | Lamm | Chicago Transit Authority | 3:22 |
| 6. | "South California Purples" | Lamm | Chicago Transit Authority | 6:11 |
| 7. | "I'm a Man" (New edit) | Jimmy Miller/Steve Winwood | Chicago Transit Authority | 5:43 |
| 8. | "Movin' In" | James Pankow | Chicago, 1970 | 4:06 |
| 9. | "Wake Up Sunshine" | Lamm | Chicago | 2:29 |
| 10. | "Ballet for a Girl in Buchannon: Make Me Smile/So Much to Say, So Much to Give/Anxiety's Moment/West Virginia's Fantasies" | Pankow | Chicago | 7:02 |
| 11. | "Ballet for a Girl in Buchannon: Colour My World" | Pankow | Chicago | 3:00 |
| 12. | "Ballet for a Girl in Buchannon: To Be Free/Now More Than Ever" | Pankow | Chicago | 2:41 |
| 13. | "Fancy Colours" | Lamm | Chicago | 5:10 |
| 14. | "25 or 6 to 4" | Lamm | Chicago | 4:50 |
| 15. | "Poem for the People" | Lamm | Chicago | 5:31 |
| 16. | "It Better End Soon: 1st Movement/3rd Movement/4th Movement" | Lamm/Kath | Chicago | 6:37 |

Disc two
| No. | Title | Writer(s) | Original album | Length |
|---|---|---|---|---|
| 1. | "Loneliness Is Just a Word" | Lamm | Chicago III, 1971 | 2:36 |
| 2. | "Travel Suite: Flight 602" | Lamm | Chicago III | 2:45 |
| 3. | "Travel Suite: Free" | Lamm | Chicago III | 2:16 |
| 4. | "Mother" | Lamm | Chicago III | 4:30 |
| 5. | "Lowdown" | Peter Cetera/Danny Seraphine | Chicago III | 3:35 |
| 6. | "An Hour in the Shower": "A Hard Risin' Morning Without Breakfast/Off to Work/Fallin' Out/Dreamin' Home/Morning Blues Again" | Kath | Chicago III | 5:28 |
| 7. | "A Hit by Varèse" | Lamm | Chicago V, 1972 | 4:55 |
| 8. | "All Is Well" | Lamm | Chicago V | 3:50 |
| 9. | "Saturday in the Park" | Lamm | Chicago V | 3:56 |
| 10. | "Dialogue (Part I & II)" | Lamm | Chicago V | 7:10 |
| 11. | "Just You 'n' Me" | Pankow | Chicago VI, 1973 | 3:42 |
| 12. | "Something in This City Changes People" | Lamm | Chicago VI | 3:42 |
| 13. | "In Terms of Two" | Cetera | Chicago VI | 3:29 |
| 14. | "Feelin' Stronger Every Day" | Cetera/Pankow | Chicago VI | 4:14 |
| 15. | "(I've Been) Searchin' So Long" | Pankow | Chicago VII, 1974 | 4:29 |
| 16. | "Mongonucleosis" | Pankow | Chicago VII | 3:26 |
| 17. | "Wishing You Were Here" | Cetera | Chicago VII | 4:37 |
| 18. | "Call on Me" | Lee Loughnane | Chicago VII | 4:02 |
| 19. | "Happy Man" (GH2 edit) | Cetera | Chicago VII | 3:14 |

Disc three
| No. | Title | Writer(s) | Original album | Length |
|---|---|---|---|---|
| 1. | "Harry Truman" | Lamm | Chicago VIII, 1975 | 3:01 |
| 2. | "Old Days" | Pankow | Chicago VIII | 3:31 |
| 3. | "Brand New Love Affair, Part I & II" | Pankow | Chicago VIII | 4:27 |
| 4. | "Never Been in Love Before" | Lamm | Chicago VIII | 4:10 |
| 5. | "You Are on My Mind" (Single version) | Pankow | Chicago X, 1976 | 3:12 |
| 6. | "Mama Mama" | Cetera | Chicago X | 3:30 |
| 7. | "Hope for Love" | Kath | Chicago X | 3:03 |
| 8. | "Another Rainy Day in New York City" | Lamm | Chicago X | 3:01 |
| 9. | "Gently I'll Wake You" | Lamm | Chicago X | 3:33 |
| 10. | "If You Leave Me Now" | Cetera | Chicago X | 3:56 |
| 11. | "Mississippi Delta City Blues" | Kath | Chicago XI, 1977 | 4:39 |
| 12. | "Baby, What a Big Surprise" | Cetera | Chicago XI | 3:04 |
| 13. | "Take Me Back to Chicago" | Seraphine/David Wolinski | Chicago XI | 5:17 |
| 14. | "Prelude (Little One)/Little One" | Seraphine/Wolinski | Chicago XI | 6:34 |
| 15. | "Gone Long Gone" | Cetera | Hot Streets, 1978 | 4:00 |
| 16. | "No Tell Lover" (Single version) | Cetera/Loughnane/Seraphine | Hot Streets | 3:48 |
| 17. | "Alive Again" (Single version) | Pankow | Hot Streets | 3:28 |
| 18. | "The Greatest Love on Earth" | Seraphine/Wolinski | Hot Streets | 3:18 |
| 19. | "Little Miss Lovin'" | Cetera | Hot Streets | 4:36 |
| 20. | "Hot Streets" | Lamm | Hot Streets | 5:14 |

Disc four
| No. | Title | Writer(s) | Original album | Length |
|---|---|---|---|---|
| 1. | "Street Player" (Single version) | Seraphine/Wolinski | Chicago 13, 1979 | 4:23 |
| 2. | "Must Have Been Crazy" | Donnie Dacus | Chicago 13 | 3:23 |
| 3. | "Manipulation" (Single version) | Lamm | Chicago XIV, 1980 | 3:29 |
| 4. | "Thunder and Lightning" | Cetera/Lamm/Seraphine | Chicago XIV | 3:32 |
| 5. | "Song for You" | Cetera | Chicago XIV | 3:41 |
| 6. | "The American Dream" | Pankow | Chicago XIV | 3:17 |
| 7. | "Love Me Tomorrow" (2002 remastered edit) | Cetera/David Foster | Chicago 16, 1982 | 4:59 |
| 8. | "Chains" | Ian Thomas | Chicago 16 | 3:22 |
| 9. | "What You're Missing" (2002 remastered edit) | Jay Gruska/Joseph Williams | Chicago 16 | 3:30 |
| 10. | "Hard to Say I'm Sorry/Get Away" | Cetera/Foster/Lamm | Chicago 16 | 5:06 |
| 11. | "Stay the Night" | Cetera/Foster | Chicago 17, 1984 | 3:48 |
| 12. | "We Can Stop the Hurtin'" | Lamm/Bill Champlin/Deborah Neal | Chicago 17 | 4:11 |
| 13. | "Hard Habit to Break" | Steve Kipner/Jon Parker | Chicago 17 | 4:43 |
| 14. | "Along Comes a Woman" (Single version) | Cetera/Mark Goldenberg | Chicago 17 | 3:46 |
| 15. | "You're the Inspiration" | Cetera/Foster | Chicago 17 | 3:48 |
| 16. | "Good for Nothing" | Lamm/Foster/Richard Marx | We Are the World, 1985 | 3:38 |
| 17. | "If She Would Have Been Faithful..." | Kipner/Randy Goodrum | Chicago 18, 1986 | 3:51 |
| 18. | "Forever" | Lamm/Bill Gable | Chicago 18 | 5:17 |
| 19. | "Will You Still Love Me?" (Single version) | Foster/Tom Keane/Richard Baskin | Chicago 18 | 4:11 |
| 20. | "Niagara Falls" | Kipner/Bobby Caldwell | Chicago 18 | 3:42 |

Disc five
| No. | Title | Writer(s) | Original album | Length |
|---|---|---|---|---|
| 1. | "Heart in Pieces" | Tim Feehan/Brian MacLeod/Diane Warren | Chicago 19, 1988 | 5:04 |
| 2. | "Look Away" | Diane Warren | Chicago 19 | 3:59 |
| 3. | "What Kind of Man Would I Be?" | Jason Scheff/Chas Sandford/Bobby Caldwell | Chicago 19 | 4:19 |
| 4. | "I Don't Wanna Live Without Your Love" | Warren/Albert Hammond | Chicago 19 | 3:55 |
| 5. | "We Can Last Forever" | Scheff/John Dexter | Chicago 19 | 3:45 |
| 6. | "You're Not Alone" (Single version) | Jim Scott | Chicago 19 | 3:56 |
| 7. | "Hearts in Trouble" | Champlin/Dennis Matkowsky/Kevin Dukes | Days of Thunder soundtrack, 1990 | 4:01 |
| 8. | "Only Time Can Heal the Wounded" | Lamm/Gerard McMahon | Twenty 1, 1991 | 4:43 |
| 9. | "You Come to My Senses" | Billy Steinberg/Tom Kelly | Twenty 1 | 3:49 |
| 10. | "God Save the Queen" | Pankow/Scheff | Twenty 1 | 4:19 |
| 11. | "Chasin' the Wind" | Warren | Twenty 1 | 4:18 |
| 12. | "All the Years" | Lamm/Bruce Gaitsch | Previously unreleased, 2003; later released as a part of Chicago XXXII: Stone of Sisyphus, 2008 (originally recorded in 1993) | 4:16 |
| 13. | "Stone of Sisyphus" | Dawayne Bailey/Loughnane | Previously unreleased; later released as a part of Chicago XXXII: Stone of Sisyphus | 4:12 |
| 14. | "Bigger Than Elvis" | Scheff/Peter Wolf/Ima Wolf | Previously unreleased; later released as a part of Chicago XXXII: Stone of Sisyphus | 4:31 |
| 15. | "Caravan" | Duke Ellington/Irving Mills/Juan Tizol | Night & Day: Big Band, 1995 | 3:23 |
| 16. | "Here in My Heart" | Glen Ballard/James Newton Howard | The Heart of Chicago 1967–1997, 1997 | 4:15 |
| 17. | "The Only One" (Single version) | Pankow/Greg O'Connor | The Heart of Chicago 1967–1997 | 4:38 |
| 18. | "All Roads Lead to You" | Marc Beeson/Desmond Child | The Heart of Chicago 1967–1998 Volume II, 1998 | 4:20 |
| 19. | "Show Me a Sign" | Pankow/O'Connor | The Heart of Chicago 1967–1998 Volume II | 3:35 |

=== Disc 6: DVD ===
Features live material from 1972 and promotional videos for Chicago 13 in 1979.

== Personnel ==
- Dawayne Bailey - electric guitar, lead & background vocals
- Peter Cetera - electric bass, lead & background vocals, acoustic guitar
- Bill Champlin - keyboards, lead & background vocals, guitar
- Donnie Dacus - guitar, lead & background vocals
- Laudir de Oliveira - congas, percussion, background vocals
- Bruce Gaitsch - guitar
- Keith Howland - guitar, background vocals
- Tris Imboden - drums, harmonica
- Terry Kath - guitar, lead & background vocals, bass, percussion
- Robert Lamm - piano, keyboards, percussion, lead & background vocals
- Lee Loughnane - trumpet, flugelhorn, percussion, background vocals
- James Pankow - trombone, percussion, background vocals
- Walter Parazaider - saxophone, flute, woodwinds, percussion, background vocals
- Chris Pinnick - guitar
- Jason Scheff - bass, lead & background vocals
- Danny Seraphine - drums, drum programming, percussion, background vocals
