= The Best of Chicago: 40th Anniversary Edition =

Greatest hits album by Chicago
- Released: October 2, 2007
- Recorded: January 1969 – 2005
- Genre: Rock
- Label: Rhino
- Producer: James William Guercio, Phil Ramone, Chicago, David Foster, Ron Nevison, Chas Sandford and Bruce Fairbairn

Chicago chronology
Chicago XXX (2006)	The Best of Chicago: 40th Anniversary Edition (2007)	Chicago XXXII: Stone of Sisyphus (2008)

Professional ratings
Review scores
Source	Rating
AllMusic	4/5 stars

The Best of Chicago: 40th Anniversary is a double greatest hits album, and the thirty-first album overall, by American rock band Chicago, released by Rhino Records on October 2, 2007. It consists of two discs containing 30 of Chicago's top 40 singles. It is the fourth compilation of past hits released by their label since beginning of the decade. Most of the songs on this compilation are presented as their shorter length radio-single edits, as opposed to the album versions. It also features "Love Will Come Back" without Rascal Flatts' vocals.

The 39 tracks of The Very Best of Chicago: Only the Beginning holds all the tracks of 40th Anniversary except for the tracks 13–15 on disc 2.

Although no indication is given on the discs or the cover, the album could also be considered as Chicago XXXI (31) in their canon, as it is preceded by Chicago XXX (30) in 2006, and followed by Chicago XXXII: Stone of Sisyphus in 2008. This is further emphasized by the display of albums on the band's website.

== Track listing ==
Disc One
No.	Title	Writer(s)	Original album	Length
1.	"Questions 67 & 68" (Single version)	Robert Lamm	Chicago Transit Authority, 1969	3:26
2.	"25 or 6 to 4" (Single version)	Lamm	Chicago, 1970	2:52
3.	"Does Anybody Really Know What Time It Is?" (Promo single version)	Lamm	Chicago Transit Authority	2:45
4.	"Make Me Smile" (Single version)	James Pankow	Chicago	2:59
5.	"Beginnings" (Single version)	Lamm	Chicago Transit Authority	2:48
6.	"Colour My World"	Pankow	Chicago	3:02
7.	"Saturday in the Park"	Lamm	Chicago V, 1972	3:56
8.	"Feelin' Stronger Every Day"	Pankow/Peter Cetera	Chicago VI, 1973	4:14
9.	"Just You 'n' Me"	Pankow	Chicago VI	3:42
10.	"(I've Been) Searchin' So Long" (Single version)	Pankow	Chicago VII, 1974	4:18
11.	"Call on Me"	Lee Loughnane	Chicago VII	4:01
12.	"Wishing You Were Here" (Single version)	Cetera	Chicago VII	3:00
13.	"Old Days"	Pankow	Chicago VIII, 1975	3:30
14.	"Another Rainy Day in New York City"	Lamm	Chicago X, 1976	3:00
15.	"If You Leave Me Now"	Cetera	Chicago X	3:56

Disc Two
No.	Title	Writer(s)	Original album	Length
1.	"Baby, What a Big Surprise"	Cetera	Chicago XI, 1977	3:06
2.	"No Tell Lover" (Single version)	Loughnane/Danny Seraphine/Cetera	Hot Streets, 1978	3:50
3.	"Hard to Say I'm Sorry" (Single version)	Cetera/David Foster	Chicago 16, 1982	3:41
4.	"Love Me Tomorrow" (Single version)	Cetera/Foster	Chicago 16	3:58
5.	"Hard Habit to Break"	Cetera/Foster	Chicago 17, 1984	4:45
6.	"You're the Inspiration"	Cetera/Foster	Chicago 17	3:48
7.	"Will You Still Love Me?" (Single version)	Foster/Tom Keane/Richard Baskin	Chicago 18, 1986	4:13
8.	"If She Would Have Been Faithful..."	Steve Kipner/Randy Goodrum	Chicago 18	3:51
9.	"I Don't Wanna Live Without Your Love"	Albert Hammond/Diane Warren	Chicago 19, 1988	3:54
10.	"Look Away" (Single version)	Warren	Chicago 19	4:00
11.	"What Kind of Man Would I Be?" (Single version)	Jason Scheff, Chas Sandford, Bobby Caldwell	Chicago 19	4:19
12.	"You're Not Alone" (Single version)	Jim Scott	Chicago 19	4:00
13.	"Here in My Heart"	Glen Ballard/James Newton Howard	The Heart of Chicago 1967–1997, 1997	4:20
14.	"Feel" (Horn section mix)	Danny Orton/Blair Daly	Chicago XXX, 2006	4:31
15.	"Love Will Come Back"	Scheff/Jay DeMarcus/Sandford	Chicago XXX	3:43

== Charts ==
=== Weekly charts ===
Weekly chart performance for The Best of Chicago: 40th Anniversary Edition
Chart (2007)	Peak position
US Billboard 200	100

== Personnel ==
=== Chicago ===
- Dawayne Bailey – guitar, vocals
- Peter Cetera – bass, vocals
- Bill Champlin – guitar, keyboards, vocals, group member
- Donnie Dacus – guitar, vocals
- Laudir DeOliveira – percussion, congas, vocals
- Bruce Gaitsch – guitar
- Keith Howland – guitar, vocals, group member
- Tris Imboden – drums, group member
- Terry Kath – guitar, vocals
- Robert Lamm – keyboards, vocals, lyrics, songwriting, group member
- Lee Loughnane – trumpet, flugelhorn, vocals, lyrics, songwriting, group member
- James Pankow – trombone, vocals, lyrics, songwriting, group member
- Walter Parazaider – vocals, woodwinds, lyrics, songwriting, group member
- Chris Pinnick – guitar
- Jason Scheff – bass, vocals, group member
- Daniel Seraphine – percussion, drums, vocals

=== Production ===
- Producer – Jay DeMarcus, David Foster, James William Guercio, James Newton Howard, Ron Nevison, Phil Ramone, Chas Sandford, Mike Engstrom, Cheryl Pawelski
- Album cover design – Mark Paul Rosenmeier
- Design – Joshua Banker, Don Jr. Garlock, Vincent Gonzales, Jim Jamitis, Jean Krikorian, Arnaud Leger, Al Mainwaring, Craig Stevens, Ashley Underwood
- Photography – Jimmy Katz
- Remastering – David Donnelly
- Liner notes – Bill DeYoung
- Product Manager – Mike Engstrom
- Project assistant – Scott Webber
- Supervisor – Jeff Magid
- Editorial Supervision – Vanessa Atkins, Sheryl Farber
- Annotation – Steve Woolard

== Certifications ==
Region	Certification	Certified units/sales
United States (RIAA)	Gold	500,000^{^}
^{^} Shipments figures based on certification alone.
