= Love Songs (Chicago album) =

Compilation album by Chicago
- Released: January 25, 2005
- Recorded: January 1969 – August 2004
- Genre: Rock; adult contemporary
- Length: 76:53
- Label: Rhino
- Producer: James William Guercio, Phil Ramone, Chicago, David Foster, Ron Nevison, Chas Sandford, Bruce Fairbairn, James Newton Howard

Chicago chronology
The Box (2003)	Love Songs (2005)	Chicago XXX (2006)

Professional ratings
Review scores
Source	Rating
AllMusic	4/5 stars

Love Songs is a compilation album of romantic songs by the American band Chicago, their twenty-ninth album overall, released in 2005 through Rhino Records.

Featuring a sampling of many of their love songs over the course of their long career, this set spans from their 1969 debut album to two exclusive new live recordings with Earth, Wind & Fire in 2004. Versions released outside of the US also include solo efforts by former member Peter Cetera which were never recorded by the band.

Released in January 2005 in time for the Valentine's Day market, Love Songs managed to reach #57 in the US album charts. A deluxe version was released on February 14, 2025 with a different set of track list.

== Track listing ==
1. "You're the Inspiration" (Peter Cetera/David Foster) – 3:48
2. "If You Leave Me Now" (Live in 2004) (Cetera) – 4:14
  - A new live recording in August 2004 featuring Philip Bailey of Earth, Wind & Fire on lead vocals
3. "Hard to Say I'm Sorry/Get Away" (Cetera/Foster/Robert Lamm) – 5:06
4. "Here in My Heart" (James Newton Howard/Glen Ballard) – 4:14
5. "Call on Me" (Lee Loughnane) – 4:03
6. "Colour My World" (James Pankow) – 3:02
7. "Just You 'n' Me" (Pankow) – 3:42
8. "After the Love Has Gone" (Live in 2004) (Bill Champlin/Foster/Jay Graydon) – 5:19
  - A new live recording of Earth, Wind and Fire's 1979 hit, featuring Bill Champlin - the song's co-writer - on lead vocals
9. "Hard Habit to Break" (Steve Kipner/Jon Parker) – 4:45
10. "Look Away" (Diane Warren) – 4:01
11. "Beginnings" (Lamm) – 6:27
  - Edited version
12. "Happy Man" (Cetera) – 3:15
13. "Will You Still Love Me?" (Foster/Tom Keane/Richard Baskin) – 4:12
14. "No Tell Lover" (Loughnane/Danny Seraphine/Cetera) – 3:50
15. "I Don't Wanna Live Without Your Love" (Warren/Albert Hammond) – 3:56
16. "Never Been in Love Before" (Lamm) – 4:10
17. "What Kind of Man Would I Be?" (Jason Scheff/Chas Sanford/Bobby Caldwell) – 4:14
18. "Wishing You Were Here" (Cetera) – 4:36

Love Songs (Rhino 78451) reached No. 57 in the US during a chart run of three weeks.

=== International release ===
1. "You're the Inspiration" (Cetera/Foster) – 3:48
2. "If You Leave Me Now" (Live in 2004) (Cetera) – 4:14
  - A new live recording in August 2004 featuring Philip Bailey of Earth, Wind & Fire on lead vocals
3. "Saturday in the Park" (Lamm) – 3:56
4. "Hard to Say I'm Sorry/Get Away" (Cetera/Foster/Lamm) – 5:06
5. "Here in My Heart" (Howard/Ballard) – 4:14
6. "Call on Me" (Loughnane) – 4:03
7. "Colour My World" (Pankow) – 3:02
8. "Glory of Love" - Peter Cetera (Cetera/Foster/Diane Nini) – 4:20
9. "After the Love Has Gone" (Live in 2004) (Champlin/Foster/Graydon) – 5:19
  - A new live recording of Earth, Wind and Fire's 1979 hit, featuring Bill Champlin - the song's co-writer - on lead vocals
10. "Hard Habit to Break" (Kipner/Parker) – 4:45
11. "Look Away" (Warren) – 4:01
12. "Beginnings" (Lamm) – 6:27
  - Edited version
13. "The Next Time I Fall" - Peter Cetera & Amy Grant (Caldwell/Paul Gordon) – 3:43
14. "Will You Still Love Me?" (Foster/Keane/Baskin) – 4:12
15. "No Tell Lover" (Loughnane/Seraphine/Cetera) – 3:50
16. "I Don't Wanna Live Without Your Love" (Warren/Hammond) – 3:56
17. "What Kind of Man Would I Be?" (Scheff/Sanford/Caldwell) – 4:14
18. "Just You 'n' Me" (Pankow) – 3:42
19. "If You Leave Me Now" (Original 1976 version) (Cetera) – 3:56

=== Deluxe Version ===
1. "You're the Inspiration"
2. "If You Leave Me Now"
3. "Hard to Say I'm Sorry/Get Away"
4. "Call on Me" (2002 Remaster)
5. "Colour My World" (2002 Remaster)
6. "Just You 'n' Me" (2012 Remaster)
7. "Hard Habit to Break"
8. "Baby, What a Big Surprise" (2002 Remaster)
9. "Look Away"
10. "Beginnings" (2002 Remaster)
11. "Happy Man" (2002 Remaster)
12. "Will You Still Love Me?" (2002 Remaster)
13. "We Can Last Forever"
14. "No Tell Lover" (2002 Remaster)
15. "Stay the Night"
16. "I Don't Wanna Live Without Your Love"
17. "(I've Been) Searchin' So Long" (2002 Remaster)
18. "What Kind of Man Would I Be?"
19. "Love Me Tomorrow" (2002 Remaster)
20. "Wishing You Were Here" (2002 Remaster)

== Personnel ==
- Matthew Abels – project assistant
- Karen Ahmed – compilation producer
- Hugh Brown – art direction, design, photography
- Chicago – producer
- Reggie Collins – project assistant
- David Donnelly – mastering, mixing
- Mike Engstrom – compilation producer
- David Foster – producer
- Cory Frye – project assistant
- A. Scott Galloway – liner notes
- James William Guercio – producer
- Jon Heintz – mixing
- James Newton Howard – producer
- Robin Hurley – compilation producer
- Karen LeBlanc – project assistant
- Lee Loughnane – producer
- Jeff Magid – audio engineer
- Ron Nevison – producer
- Bob O'Neill – project assistant
- Randy Perry – project assistant
- Gary Peterson – project assistant
- Phil Ramone – producer
- Chas Sandford – producer
- Maria Villar – art direction, design

== Charts ==
Chart (2005)	Peak position
Japanese Albums (Oricon)	41
Portuguese Albums (AFP)	15
Swedish Albums (Sverigetopplistan)	5
Swiss Albums (Schweizer Hitparade)	56
US Billboard 200	57

Chart (2016)	Peak position
Irish Albums (IRMA)	90
