= Greatest Hits 1982–1989 =

1989 compilation album by Chicago

Greatest hits album by Chicago
- Released: November 21, 1989
- Recorded: 1982–1988
- Genres: Rock; adult contemporary
- Length: 52:24
- Labels: Full Moon; Reprise
- Producers: David Foster; Ron Nevison; Chas Sandford

Chicago chronology
Chicago 19 (1988)	Greatest Hits 1982–1989 (1989)	Twenty 1 (1991)

Singles from Greatest Hits 1982–1989
- 1. "What Kind of Man Would I Be?" Released: November 17, 1989

Professional ratings
Review scores
Source	Rating
AllMusic	4/5 stars

Greatest Hits 1982–1989 (also known as Chicago 20) is the third greatest hits album by the American band Chicago, released by Full Moon/Reprise Records on November 21, 1989. It became one of Chicago's biggest selling albums, having been certified five times platinum in the United States.

Spanning from Chicago 16 in 1982 to Chicago 19 in 1988, the set includes founding vocalist Peter Cetera and his successor Jason Scheff. It includes a remix of "What Kind of Man Would I Be?, as well as also being Chicago's last release before the dismissal of its original drummer Danny Seraphine in the following year after its release.

A variation titled The Heart of... Chicago was issued in countries outside North America, with similar artwork but a different track list including four songs originally released on the Columbia record label.

== Track listing Greatest Hits 1982–1989 ==
1. "Hard to Say I'm Sorry/Get Away" (Peter Cetera, David Foster, Robert Lamm) – 5:07
2. "Look Away" (Diane Warren) – 4:03
3. "Stay the Night" (Cetera, Foster) – 3:49
4. "Will You Still Love Me?" (Foster, Tom Keane, Richard Baskin) – 5:43
5. "Love Me Tomorrow" (Cetera, Foster) – 5:06
6. "What Kind of Man Would I Be?" (Remix) (Jason Scheff, Chas Sandford, Bobby Caldwell) – 4:14
7. "You're the Inspiration" (Cetera, Foster) – 3:50
8. "I Don't Wanna Live Without Your Love" (Warren, Albert Hammond) – 3:52
9. "Hard Habit to Break" (Steve Kipner, Jon Parker) – 4:44
10. "Along Comes a Woman" (Cetera, Mark Goldenberg) – 4:16
11. "If She Would Have Been Faithful..." (Kipner, Randy Goodrum) – 3:53
12. "We Can Last Forever" (Scheff, John Dexter) – 3:44

Unlike the two previous Greatest Hits albums, all of the songs were in their original album lengths, except "What Kind of Man Would I Be?". Some US copies on vinyl, and possibly some CDs, list "Along Comes a Woman" but actually contain "Remember the Feeling" (originally the flipside of "Hard Habit to Break").

== Track listing The Heart of... Chicago ==
No.	Title	Writer(s)	Length
1.	"If You Leave Me Now" (from Chicago X, 1976)	Cetera	3:57
2.	"Baby, What a Big Surprise" (from Chicago XI, 1977)	Cetera	3:03
3.	"Where Did the Lovin' Go" (from Chicago XIV, 1980)	Cetera	4:07
4.	"Take Me Back to Chicago" (from Chicago XI, 1977)	Danny Seraphine, David Wolinski	5:16
5.	"Hard to Say I'm Sorry/Get Away" (from Chicago 16, 1982)	Cetera, Foster, Lamm	5:08
6.	"Love Me Tomorrow" (from Chicago 16, 1982)	Cetera, Foster	5:07
7.	"Hard Habit to Break" (from Chicago 17, 1984)	Kipner, Parker	4:44
8.	"Only You" (from Chicago 17, 1984)	James Pankow, Foster	3:54
9.	"You're the Inspiration" (from Chicago 17, 1984)	Cetera, Foster	3:49
10.	"Along Comes a Woman" (from Chicago 17, 1984)	Cetera, Goldenberg	4:16
11.	"Remember the Feeling" (from Chicago 17, 1984)	Cetera, Bill Champlin	4:29
12.	"If She Would Have Been Faithful" (from Chicago 18, 1986)	Kipner, Goodrum	3:53
13.	"Will You Still Love Me?" (from Chicago 18, 1986)	Foster, Keane, Baskin	5:44
14.	"What Kind of Man Would I Be" (from Chicago 19, 1988)	Scheff, Sandford, Caldwell	4:14
15.	"Look Away" (from Chicago 19, 1988)	Warren	4:01
Total length:			63:02

== Charts ==
=== Weekly charts ===
Greatest Hits 1982–1989
Chart (1988)	Peak position
Canada Top Albums/CDs (RPM)	73
US Billboard 200	37

The Heart of... Chicago
Chart (1989–1994)	Peak position
Dutch Albums (Album Top 100)	2
Finnish Albums (Suomen virallinen lista)	8
German Albums (Offizielle Top 100)	47
Italian Albums (Musica e Dischi)	23
Japanese Albums (Oricon)	40
Norwegian Albums (VG-lista)	4
Scottish Albums (Official Charts)	5
UK Albums (Official Charts)	6

== Certifications ==
Greatest Hits 1982–1989

Region	Certification	Certified units/sales
Canada (Music Canada)	Gold	50,000^{^}
United States (RIAA)	5× Platinum	5,000,000^{^}
^{^} Shipments figures based on certification alone.

The Heart of... Chicago

Region	Certification	Certified units/sales
Finland (Musiikkituottajat)	Gold	25,327
Japan (RIAJ)	Gold	100,000^{^}
Netherlands (NVPI)	Platinum	100,000^{^}
Spain (Promusicae)	Platinum	100,000^{^}
United Kingdom (BPI)	Platinum	300,000^{^}
^{^} Shipments figures based on certification alone.
