= VI Decades Live: This Is What We Do =

Live album by Chicago
- Released: April 6, 2018
- Recorded: 1969–2014
- Venue: Isle of Wight Festival (Newport, Isle of Wight); Olympia Hall (Paris, France); John F. Kennedy Center for the Performing Arts (Washington D.C.); Hordern Pavilion (Sydney, Australia); Chicago Stadium (Chicago, Illinois); Oakland Coliseum (Oakland, California); Greek Theater (Los Angeles; Pensacola Bay Center (Pensacola, Florida); Dos Equis Pavilion (Dallas, Texas); Caesars Atlantic City (Atlantic City, New Jersey); Grand Opera House (Wilmington, Delaware); Grugahalle (Essen, Germany)
- Studio: Caribou Ranch (Nederland, Colorado)
- Label: Rhino

Chicago chronology
| Quadio (2016) | VI Decades Live: This Is What We Do (2018) | Chicago II Live on Soundstage (2018) |

VI Decades Live: This Is What We Do is a four-CD and one-DVD live box set by the American rock band Chicago, released on April 6, 2018 by Rhino Records. The collection features previously unreleased live performances recorded between 1969 and 2014, including the band's full concert at the Isle of Wight Festival in 1970 and a 1977 performance filmed for the German television program Rockpalast. The box set includes a 24-page booklet containing rare photographs and archival material.

== Background ==
The project was compiled from Chicago's vault of live recordings, drawing on tapes spanning the band's first six decades. According to Rhino, the set was designed to highlight the group's evolution in concert, showcasing multiple lineups over their career. The Isle of Wight 1970 performance represents one of the earliest complete Chicago concerts ever officially issued.

== Critical reception ==
VI Decades Live: This Is What We Do received positive reviews from music critics. The Second Disc described the Isle of Wight performance as "raw, powerful, and politically charged," calling the early Chicago lineup "a force of nature onstage." Reviewer Jeff Burger highlighted the box set's focus on Chicago's early, horn-driven period, stating that the majority of the material comes from the band's “most inventive and energetic years.”

NoTreble praised the release for offering “an expansive live history” of the band, particularly noting the quality of the vintage tapes used.

== Track listing ==
Side one
| No. | Venue | Title | Writer(s) | Lead vocals | Length |
|---|---|---|---|---|---|
| 1 | "Isle Of Wight Festival" (August 28, 1970) | "Introduction" | Terry Kath | Kath | 6:55 |
| 2 | "Isle Of Wight Festival" (August 28, 1970) | "South California Purples" | Robert Lamm | Lamm | 10:28 |
| 3 | "Isle Of Wight Festival" (August 28, 1970) | "Beginnings" | Lamm | Lamm | 6:06 |
| 4 | "Isle Of Wight Festival" (August 28, 1970) | "In the Country" | Kath | Kath; Peter Cetera | 6:34 |
| 5 | "Isle Of Wight Festival" (August 28, 1970) | "Does Anybody Really Know What Time It Is?" (Free Form Intro) | Lamm | | 3:52 |
| 6 | "Isle Of Wight Festival" (August 28, 1970) | "Does Anybody Really Know What Time It Is?" | Lamm | Lamm | 3:16 |
| 7 | "Isle Of Wight Festival" (August 28, 1970) | "Mother" | Lamm | Lamm | 6:29 |

Side two
| No. | Venue | Title | Writer(s) | Lead vocals | Length |
|---|---|---|---|---|---|
| 1 | "Isle Of Wight Festival" (August 28, 1970) | "It Better End Soon" | Lamm; Walter Parazaider; Kath | Kath | 16:18 |
| 2 | "Isle Of Wight Festival" (August 28, 1970) | "Ballet for a Girl in Buchannon" | Pankow | Kath; Lamm | 13:24 |
| 3 | "Isle Of Wight Festival" (August 28, 1970) | "25 or 6 to 4" | Lamm | Cetera | 8:24 |
| 4 | "Isle Of Wight Festival" (August 28, 1970) | "I'm a Man" | Steve Winwood; Jimmy Miller | Lamm; Kath; Cetera | 8:29 |

Side three
| No. | Venue | Title | Writer(s) | Lead vocals | Length |
|---|---|---|---|---|---|
| 1 | Olympia Hall (December 8, 1969) | "Poem for the People" | Lamm | Lamm | 6:02 |
| 2 | Olympia Hall (December 8, 1969) | "25 or 6 to 4" | Lamm | Cetera | 6:17 |
| 3 | Olympia Hall (December 8, 1969) | "Liberation" | Pankow | | 16:10 |
| 4 | John F. Kennedy Center for the Performing Arts (September 16, 1971) | "Goodbye" | Lamm | Cetera | 6:26 |
| 5 | Hordern Pavilion (June 26, 1972) | "Now That You're Gone" | Pankow | Kath | 4:55 |
| 6 | Chicago Stadium (August 13, 1973) | "A Hit By Varèse" | Lamm | Lamm | 16:30 |
| 7 | Oakland Coliseum (December 1, 1977) | "If You Leave Me Now" | Cetera | Cetera | 4:31 |
| 8 | Oakland Coliseum (December 1, 1977) | "Takin' It on Uptown" | Kath; Fred Kagan | Kath | 6:44 |

Side four
| No. | Venue | Title | Writer(s) | Lead vocals | Length |
|---|---|---|---|---|---|
| 1 | Greek Theatre (August 11, 1978) | "Hot Streets" | Lamm | Lamm | 6:23 |
| 2 | Greek Theatre (August 11, 1978) | "Little One" | Kath; Hawk Wolinski | Kath | 9:48 |
| 3 | Pensacola Bay Center (March 21, 1987) | "Forever" | Lamm; Bill Gable | Lamm | 5:48 |
| 4 | Pensacola Bay Center (March 21, 1987) | "Medley: In the Midnight Hour, Knock on Wood, I'm a Man, Get Away (reprise)" | Wilson Pickett; Steve Cropper; Eddie Floyd; Winwood; Miller; Lamm | Bill Champlin (In the Midnight Hour), Lamm (Knock on Wood), Lamm/Jason Scheff (I'm a Man) | 13:40 |
| 5 | Coca-Cola Starplex Amphitheatre (May 30, 1992) | "You're Not Alone" | Jim Scott | Champlin | 4:27 |
| 6 | Caesars Atlantic City (July 28, 1994) | "The Pull" | Lamm; Scheff; Peter Wolf | Scheff; Champlin | 4:19 |
| 7 | Caesars Atlantic City (July 28, 1994) | "In the Mood" | Andy Razaf; Joe Garland | Champlin | 4:19 |
| 8 | Caesars Atlantic City (July 28, 1994) | "Don't Get Around Much Anymore" | Duke Ellington | Champlin; Lamm | 3:30 |
| 9 | A&E Network (September 5, 2002) | "Look Away" | Diane Warren | Champlin | 4:27 |
| 10 | Grand Opera House (May 7, 2014) | "America" | Lee Loughnane | Lou Pardini | 4:26 |

== Chart performance ==
| Chart (2018) | Peak position |
|---|---|
| German Albums (Offizielle Top 100) | 66 |
