= You Come to My Senses =

Single by Chicago

from the album Twenty 1
- B-side: "Who Do You Love"
- Released: June 1991
- Recorded: 1990
- Genre: Soft rock
- Length: 3:49
- Label: Full Moon; Reprise
- Songwriters: Billy Steinberg; Tom Kelly
- Producer: Ron Nevison

Chicago singles chronology
"Explain It to My Heart" (1991)	"You Come to My Senses" (1991)	"Dream a Little Dream of Me" (1995)

Professional ratings
Review scores
Source	Rating
AllMusic	1.5/5 stars

"You Come to My Senses" is a song by American rock band Chicago. It was the third and final single from their seventeenth studio album Twenty 1. It was written by Billy Steinberg and Tom Kelly and features Jason Scheff on vocals. The song was produced by Ron Nevison and mixed by Humberto Gatica. "You Come to My Senses" peaked at No. 11 on the Billboard Adult Contemporary chart.

== Background ==
"You Come to My Senses" came to the attention of Ron Nevison, who was tasked with producing Chicago's Twenty 1 after previously working with the band on four songs from their previous studio album, Chicago 19. According to Nevison, Jason Scheff identified "You Come to My Senses" as having commercial potential and thought that it would become a hit song for him. During the end of the recording sessions for Twenty 1, the band decided to discard Nevison's mix of the songs and bring in Humberto Gatica to remix them. Nevison was critical of Gatica's work, particularly on "You Come to My Senses", saying that he put "stupid treatments on the vocals", resulting in a vocal mix that was "swimming in all sorts of phasers and flangers."

The song was serviced to adult contemporary radio stations in the summer of 1991. During the week of July 5, 1991, the song was the second most added song to adult contemporary radio stations reporting to Radio & Records. Three weeks later, the song was receiving airplay from 54 percent of reporting adult contemporary radio stations. By the week of September 21, 1991, "You Come to My Senses" had reached its peak of No. 11 on the Billboard Adult Contemporary chart, where it spent 18 weeks on the listing. Earlier that month, the song had also reached the top 30 of the Canadian Adult Contemporary chart.

Chicago played the song on The Arsenio Hall Show, a decision that the band's guitarist Dawayne Bailey found unsuitable for the format. He also expressed his opinion that it was a mistake for Chicago to record the song.

It was a song for Air Supply or even a female artist. Ultra-sensitive. That song took 'Chicago ballad' to an all time low. I have the greatest respect for the writers of that song, Tom Kelly and Billy Steinberg, but that song was just not right for Chicago. Especially on national TV on such a 'party' atmosphere as The Arsenio Hall Show. It was a huge mistake to play that song on that particular show. I can't believe someone in power chose that song.

— Dawayne Bailey

== Reception ==
Nick DeRiso on SomethingElse! Reviews said that "You Come to My Senses" was "a bad Chicago song" that "might have been a good fit for other singers or bands, but sounds distinctly out of place in the context of the rest of Chicago’s catalog".

== Track listing ==
No.	Title	Writer(s)	Length
1.	"You Come to My Senses"	Billy Steinberg, Tom Kelly	3:49
2.	"Who Do You Love"	Bill Champlin, Dennis Matkosky	3:20

== Personnel ==
- Jason Scheff – bass guitar, lead and backing vocals
- Bill Champlin – keyboards
- Robert Lamm – keyboards
- Lee Loughnane – trumpet, flugelhorn, brass arrangement, solo
- James Pankow – trombone, brass arrangements
- Walter Parazaider – woodwinds

=== Guest musicians ===
- Steve Porcaro – keyboard programming
- John Keane – drums, percussion
- Michael Landau – guitar and solo

== Charts ==
Chart (1991)	Peak position
Canada Top Singles (RPM)	57
Canada RPM Adult Contemporary	26
US Adult Contemporary (Billboard)	11
