= Twenty 1 =

Studio album by Chicago
- Released: January 29, 1991
- Recorded: 1990
- Studios: Record Plant (Hollywood, CA); Can-Am Recorders (Tarzana, CA); Ground Control Studios (Santa Monica, CA)
- Genre: Rock
- Length: 52:01
- Labels: Full Moon; Reprise
- Producers: Ron Nevison; Humberto Gatica

Chicago chronology
Greatest Hits 1982-1989 (1989)	Twenty 1 (1991)	Night & Day: Big Band (1995)

Singles from Twenty 1
- 1. "Chasin' the Wind" Released: January 3, 1991; 2. "Explain It to My Heart" Released: April 1991; 3. "You Come to My Senses" Released: June 1991

Twenty 1 is the seventeenth studio album (and twenty-first overall) by the American band Chicago. Released on January 29, 1991, it was their first album of the 1990s. Twenty 1 spent eleven weeks on the American Billboard 200, peaking at position No. 66, and did not chart in the UK.

== Production ==
The production of Twenty 1 saw a significant personnel reconfiguration. The recent departure of founding drummer Danny Seraphine had made way for the band's "great new drummer" Tris Imboden. Session player John Keane played the majority of this album's drum tracks. Their touring guitarist since 1986, Dawayne Bailey, is credited as guitarist for Twenty 1's sessions, though all guitars are handled by Mike Landau.

Now the record company wants us to do Diane Warren songs. Two of them have been released as singles off of Twenty 1 and have stiffed [flopped], with one more soon to follow. If that one stiffs as well, then we need to think about what we're doing. I would rather fail doing our own thing than somebody else's thing.

The horns are back on Chicago Twenty 1, and the two things that I wrote on there were done especially to bring them back into the group sound. In spite of all of the success that Chicago has had since 17, for me, [the material has] not really been [authentic to] the band.

— Robert Lamm

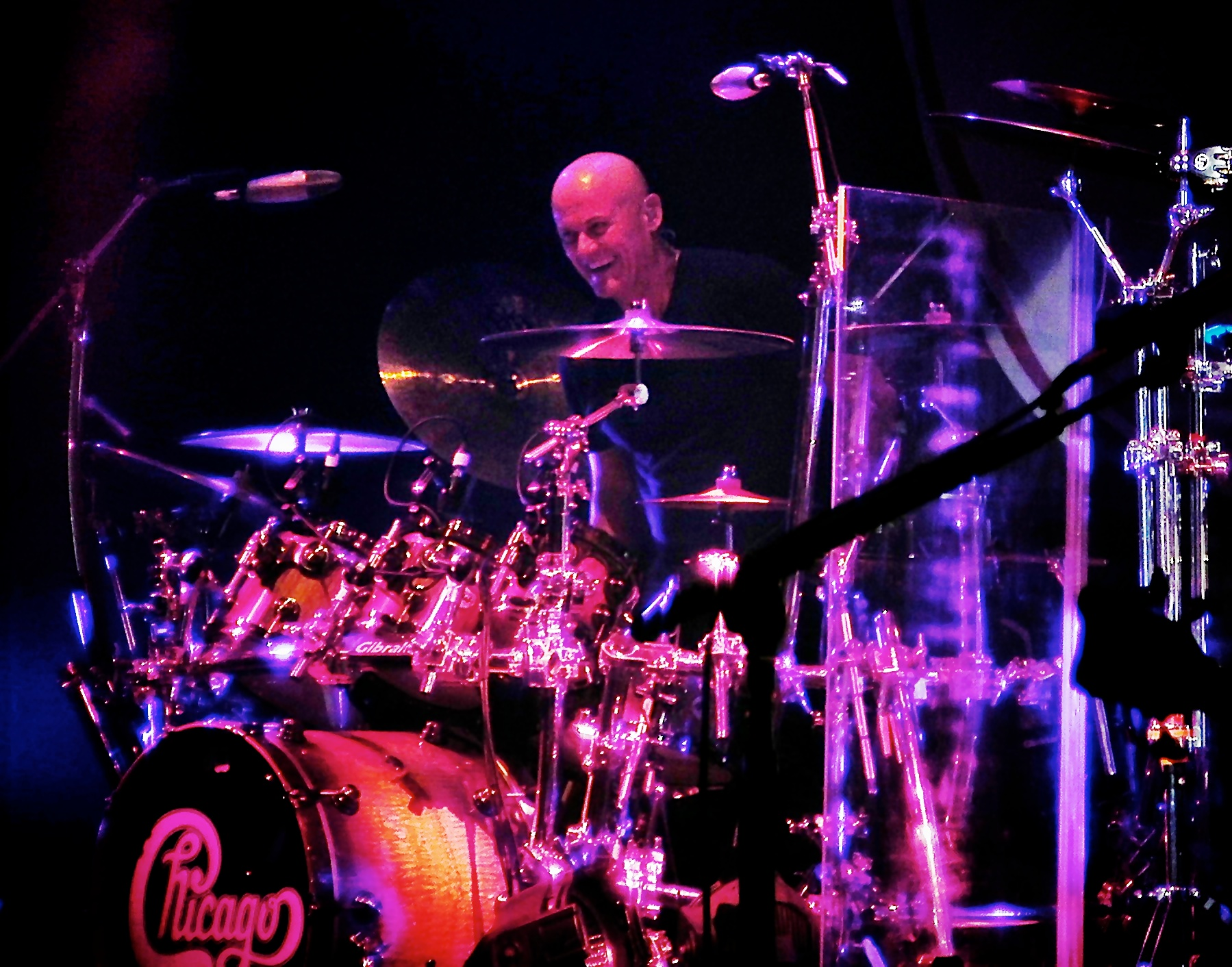
Tris Imboden was the band's new drummer for the album.

The band retained producer Ron Nevison, who'd already done Chicago 19. According to Nevison, work on the album was somewhat fragmented, with the band members rarely being in the studio together, and with work continuing with session musicians while the band was on tour. The fragmentation was furthered when Humberto Gatica was assigned to mix the final version of the album without Nevison's input.

They weren't there every night to get a mix, like most bands, and take them home, and listen to them, and digest them. They were on tour … they came in when they needed to do stuff, and you do lose some continuity with that approach, but I don't fault them for that.

— Twenty 1 producer, Ron Nevison

Although the music for Twenty 1 was considered commercially viable, the shifting of popular musical trends toward the impending grunge movement is said to have lost Chicago some valuable radio support. Nevison maintains that if his original mixes had been used, he'd have been much happier and the album could have theoretically been more successful: "It all would have worked if they’d left it alone. I promise you." The single "Chasin' the Wind" peaked at No. 39 and Twenty 1 peaked at #66 during its eleven-week period on the charts, making it their second least successful non-greatest hits album, only behind Chicago XIV.

For what was intended to be the band's twenty-second album, Stone of Sisyphus, Chicago hired producer Peter Wolf to develop what could be considered a more ambitious and experimental effort. That 1994 release was indefinitely postponed, and then finally released more than fourteen years later on June 17, 2008 as Chicago XXXII: Stone of Sisyphus. A demo "Love Is Forever" from the Twenty 1 sessions was included on the Sisyphus release.

Three singles were released: "Chasin' the Wind" (B-side "Only Time Can Heal the Wounded") in January 1991, "Explain It to My Heart" (B-side "God Save The Queen") in April 1991, and "You Come to My Senses" (B-side "Who Do You Love") in August 1991. Twenty 1 would be Chicago's last full-length album release of original songs until Chicago XXX in 2006.

== Reception ==
Professional ratings
Review scores
Source	Rating
AllMusic	2/5 stars

Twenty 1 spent eleven weeks on the American Billboard 200, peaking at position No. 66, and did not chart in the UK.

== Track listing ==
Side one
No.	Title	Writer(s)	Vocals	Length
1.	"Explain It to My Heart"	Diane Warren	Jason Scheff, with Bill Champlin	4:44
2.	"If It Were You"	J. Scheff, Darin Scheff, Tony Smith	J. Scheff	4:43
3.	"You Come to My Senses"	Billy Steinberg, Tom Kelly	J. Scheff	3:49
4.	"Somebody, Somewhere"	Bill Champlin, Dennis Matkosky, Kevin Dukes	Champlin	4:21
5.	"What Does It Take"	J. Scheff, Gerard McMahon	J. Scheff	4:38
6.	"One from the Heart"	Robert Lamm, McMahon	Robert Lamm	4:43

Side two
No.	Title	Writer(s)	Vocals	Length
7.	"Chasin' the Wind"	Warren	Champlin	4:18
8.	"God Save the Queen"	James Pankow, J. Scheff	Champlin	4:19
9.	"Man to Woman"	J. Scheff, Adam Mitchell	J. Scheff	3:56
10.	"Only Time Can Heal the Wounded"	Lamm, McMahon	Lamm	4:43
11.	"Who Do You Love"	Champlin, Matkosky	Champlin	3:20
12.	"Holdin' On"	Champlin, Tom Saviano	Champlin, with J. Scheff	4:15

The 2009 remaster features the single edit of "Explain It to My Heart" as a bonus track

Unreleased:

- "Love Is Forever" was recorded during the Twenty 1 sessions and later released as a bonus track on Chicago XXXII: Stone of Sisyphus.
- "Secrets of the Heart" remained unreleased, circulating unofficially online. This song was replaced by "Explain It to My Heart" on the final track list.
- "Holdin' On" has been found online in demo form. This was recorded in 1988 with Bill Champlin's wife, Tamara, on lead vocals and Dawayne Bailey on guitars. "Holdin' On" was originally intended for Chicago 19.

== Personnel ==
=== Chicago ===
- Dawayne Bailey – guitars (credited but does not play), backing vocals
- Bill Champlin – keyboards, lead and backing vocals, brass arrangements (11)
- Tris Imboden – drums, percussion (1)
- Robert Lamm – keyboards, lead and backing vocals, brass arrangements (6)
- Lee Loughnane – trumpet, flugelhorn, backing vocals, brass arrangements (1–9, 11, 12)
- James Pankow – trombone, backing vocals, brass arrangements (1–9, 12)
- Walter Parazaider – woodwinds, backing vocals
- Jason Scheff – bass, lead and backing vocals

=== Additional personnel ===
- Robbie Buchanan – keyboards
- Tom Keane – keyboards
- Efrain Toro – keyboards
- Steve Porcaro – keyboard programming
- David Foster – acoustic piano
- Michael Landau – guitars
- John Keane – drums (2-12)
- Stephen "Doc" Kupka – baritone saxophone
- Jerry Hey – brass arrangements (10)
- Dennis Matkosky – co-brass arrangements (11)

== Production ==
- Humberto Gatica – producer and engineer (1), mixing (all)
- Ron Nevison – producer and engineer tracks (2–12)
- Jim Mitchell – assistant engineer
- Jeff Poe – assistant engineer
- Alex Rodriguez – additional engineer
- Recorded at Record Plant (Hollywood, CA); Can-Am Recorders (Tarzana, CA); Ground Control Studios (Santa Monica, CA).
- Deandra Miller – production assistant
- Chris Cuffaro – photography
- Kosh Brooks Design – art direction, design

== Charts ==
Chart (1991)	Peak position
Canada Top Albums/CDs (RPM)	75
Dutch Albums (Album Top 100)	52
Finnish Albums (The Official Finnish Charts)	6
German Albums (Offizielle Top 100)	66
Japanese Albums (Oricon)	10
Norwegian Albums (VG-lista)	11
Swedish Albums (Sverigetopplistan)	18
Swiss Albums (Schweizer Hitparade)	27
US Billboard 200	66
