= We Can Last Forever =

Single by Chicago

from the album Chicago 19
- B-side: "One More Day"
- Released: April 21, 1989
- Recorded: 1988
- Genre: Rock
- Length: 3:45
- Label: Full Moon; Reprise
- Songwriters: Jason Scheff; John Dexter
- Producer: Ron Nevison

Chicago singles chronology
"You're Not Alone" (1989)	"We Can Last Forever" (1989)	"What Kind of Man Would I Be?" (1989)

"We Can Last Forever" is a song by the band Chicago, released as a single from their 1988 album Chicago 19 on April 21, 1989. The song was written by Jason Scheff and John Dexter, with Scheff performing lead vocals. It reached No. 55 on the US Billboard Hot 100, No. 12 on the Billboard Adult Contemporary chart, and No. 53 on the US Cash Box Top 100.

== Critical reception ==
Cash Box felt that "We Can Last Forever" was an improvement over some of the band's previous singles and felt that it was worthy of receiving radio airplay. Billboard called the song a "power chord rock ballad" that "won't disappoint those who have embraced all the others" in the band's discography.

== Personnel ==
- Jason Scheff – bass, lead and backing vocals
- Robert Lamm – keyboards, backing vocals
- Bill Champlin – keyboards, backing vocals
- Lee Loughnane – trumpet, brass arrangements
- James Pankow – trombone, brass arrangements
- Walter Parazaider – saxophone
- Danny Seraphine – drums, percussion, programming
- Dawayne Bailey – guitar, backing vocals

== Charts ==
Chart (1989)	Peak position
US Billboard Hot 100	55
US Adult Contemporary (Billboard)	12
