= Night & Day: Big Band =

Studio album by Chicago
- Released: May 23, 1995
- Recorded: December 1994 – January 1995
- Studios: Armoury Studios (Vancouver, B.C.); Record Plant (Los Angeles, CA)
- Genres: Big band; jazz; swing
- Length: 51:27
- Label: Giant
- Producer: Bruce Fairbairn

Chicago chronology
Twenty 1 (1991)	Night & Day: Big Band (1995)	The Heart of Chicago 1967–1997 (1997)

Professional ratings
Review scores
Source	Rating
AllMusic	2/5 stars
Chicago Tribune	3/5 stars

Night & Day: Big Band is the eighteenth studio album by the American band Chicago, and twenty-second overall, released in 1995. It is a departure from Top 40 material for a more thematic project, with a focus on classic big band, jazz, and swing music.

Chicago left Reprise Records and started their own imprint, Chicago Records, to distribute their music. This album was carried by Giant Records, a subsidiary of Warner Music, who also distributes Reprise.

With producer Bruce Fairbairn, Chicago recorded Night & Day: Big Band from late 1994 to early 1995 and released it that May. Although Bruce Gaitsch joined the band and played guitar on the album sessions, the guitar slot would be filled by Keith Howland later that year. Joe Perry of Aerosmith was brought in to add a solo to "Blues in the Night".

The album reached #90 in the US, on the Billboard 200 chart.

== Background ==
Chicago made its "television variety debut" in February 1973 on a television special honoring Duke Ellington, Duke Ellington... We Love You Madly, which aired on CBS. The band performed the Ellington composition, "Jump for Joy." They were the only rock musicians invited to appear on the show. Walter Parazaider cited the group's participation in the television special, and Duke Ellington's comments to them afterwards, as important factors in their decision to record this album.

== Track listing ==
No.	Title	Writer(s)	Vocals	Length
1.	"Chicago"	Fred Fisher	Robert Lamm	3:06
2.	"Caravan"	Duke Ellington, Irving Mills, Juan Tizol	Lamm	3:23
3.	"Dream a Little Dream of Me"	Fabian André, Gus Kahn, Wilbur Schwandt	Jason Scheff (with Jade)	3:12
4.	"Goody Goody"	Matty Malneck, Johnny Mercer	Bill Champlin	4:05
5.	"Moonlight Serenade"	Glenn Miller, Mitchell Parish	Lamm and Scheff	4:26
6.	"Night and Day"	Cole Porter	Scheff	5:36
7.	"Blues in the Night"	Harold Arlen, Johnny Mercer	Champlin	6:05
8.	"Sing, Sing, Sing"	Louis Prima	Lamm, Champlin, and Scheff (with Gipsy Kings)	3:21
9.	"Sophisticated Lady"	Ellington, Mills, Parish	Scheff and Lamm	5:11
10.	"In the Mood"	Joe Garland, Andy Razaf	Champlin	3:43
11.	"Don't Get Around Much Anymore"	Ellington, Bob Russell	Lamm and Champlin	3:38
12.	"Take the "A" Train"	Billy Strayhorn	Lamm	5:36

Bonus Japanese Track
No.	Title	Writer(s)	Length
13.	"String of Pearls"	Eddie Delange, Jerry Gray	3:07

== Personnel ==
Adapted from AllMusic.

=== Chicago ===
- Bill Champlin – keyboards, guitar, vocals, vocal arrangements, arrangements (4, 7, 10, 11)
- Bruce Gaitsch – guitar, arrangements (10)
- Tris Imboden – drums, harmonica, arrangements (10)
- Robert Lamm – keyboards, vocals, additional vocal arrangements, arrangements (1, 6, 9–12)
- Lee Loughnane – trumpet, flugelhorn, brass arrangements (7, 8, 10), arrangements (8), vocal arrangements (8)
- James Pankow – trombone, brass arrangements (1–6, 9–12), arrangements (2, 3, 5, 10)
- Walter Parazaider – woodwinds, arrangements (10)
- Jason Scheff – bass, vocals, additional vocal arrangements, arrangements (9, 10)

=== Additional personnel ===
- Luis Conte – percussion
- Jack Duncan – percussion on "Night and Day"
- Sal Ferreras – percussion on "Night and Day"
- The Gipsy Kings (Nicolas Reyes and Patchai Reyes) – vocals, rumba flamenco guitars and vocal arrangements on "Sing, Sing, Sing"
- Jade – vocals on "Dream a Little Dream of Me"
- Joe Perry – guitar solo on "Blues in the Night"
- Paul Shaffer – acoustic piano stylings on "Dream a Little Dream of Me"
- Bruce Fairbairn – trumpet solo on "Chicago"
- Tonino Baliardo – lead guitar on "Sing, Sing, Sing"
- Peter Wolf – arrangements on "In the Mood"
- Shelly Berg – orchestrations, big band arrangements
- Bill Watrous – big band arrangements
- Dana Douglas – trombone
- Tom Halm – music preparation on big band arrangements

== Production ==
- Bruce Fairbairn – producer
- The Gipsy Kings – co-producer (on "Sing, Sing, Sing")
- Gerard Prevost – co-producer
- John Kalodner – A&R
- Erwin Musper – engineer, mixing
- Delwyn Brooks – assistant engineer
- Mike Plotnikoff – second engineer
- Robbes Stieglitz – assistant engineer
- Recorded at Armoury Studios (Vancouver, B.C. ) and Record Plant (Los Angeles, CA).
- Bernie Grundman – mastering at Bernie Grundman Mastering (Hollywood, CA).
- Larry Vigon – art direction, design
- Brian Jackson – design
- Hugh Kretschmer – cover photography
- Guy Webster – inside photography

== Charts ==
Chart (1995)	Peak position
US Billboard 200	90
