= Chasin' the Wind =

Single by Chicago

from the album Twenty 1
- B-side: "Only Time Can Heal the Wounded"
- Released: January 3, 1991
- Recorded: 1990
- Genre: Rock
- Length: 4:18
- Label: Full Moon; Reprise
- Songwriter: Diane Warren
- Producer: Ron Nevison

Chicago singles chronology
"Hearts in Trouble" (1990)	"Chasin' the Wind" (1991)	"Explain It to My Heart" (1991)

Professional ratings
Review scores
Source	Rating
AllMusic	1.5/5 stars

"Chasin' the Wind" is a rock ballad song written by Diane Warren and recorded by the band Chicago, for their 1991 studio album Twenty 1, featuring Bill Champlin on vocals. The song was produced and engineered by Ron Nevison and mixed by Humberto Gatica.

"Chasin' the Wind" was released as the first single from Twenty 1 in January 1991. Its B-side is the song "Only Time Can Heal the Wounded".

"Chasin' the Wind" peaked at No. 13 on the Billboard Adult Contemporary chart and No. 39 on the Billboard Hot 100. It is the band's 36th and final top 40 hit on the latter chart.

The song's music video was directed by Michael Bay.

== Charts ==
Chart (1991)	Peak position
Australia (ARIA)	181
Canada Top Singles (RPM)	50
US Billboard Hot 100	39
US Adult Contemporary (Billboard)	13
US Radio Songs (Billboard)	74
US Cash Box Top 100	31
