= What Kind of Man Would I Be? =

Single by Chicago

from the album Chicago 19 and Greatest Hits 1982–1989
- B-side: "25 or 6 to 4" (Remix)
- Released: November 17, 1989
- Recorded: 1988
- Genre: Pop rock
- Length: 4:21 (album version); 4:14 (single remix)
- Label: Full Moon; Reprise
- Songwriters: Jason Scheff; Chas Sandford; Bobby Caldwell
- Producer: Chas Sandford

Chicago singles chronology
| "We Can Last Forever" (1989) | "What Kind of Man Would I Be?" (1989) | "Hearts in Trouble" (1990) |

"What Kind of Man Would I Be?" is a song written by Jason Scheff, Chas Sandford and Bobby Caldwell and recorded by the band Chicago for their 1988 album Chicago 19 and 1989 album Greatest Hits 1982–1989. Scheff sang the lead vocals.

== Background ==
According to Scheff, "What Kind of Man Would I Be" was added late into the production of Chicago 19 after their record label requested another ballad that had the potential to be a hit single. Scheff presented "What Kind of Man Would I Be" to Chas Sandford, who expressed interest in the song and subsequently worked with Scheff and Bobby Caldwell to complete it.

A slightly remixed version of the song by Humberto Gatica was included on the 1989 compilation album Greatest Hits 1982–1989. The single release of that remix was issued as a single in November 1989. During the week of December 2, 1989, "What Kind of Man Would I Be" received 48 adds to pop stations reporting to Billboard, making it the second most added song that week. The following week, the song ascended from its debut of No. 95 on the US Billboard Hot 100 to No. 55, making it the largest move on the chart that week. It peaked at number 5 on the Billboard Hot 100 during the week of February 24, 1990; as of 2025, it is Chicago's final top ten hit.

In the liner notes for the band's The Best of Chicago: 40th Anniversary Edition, Pankow commented that the producers they were working with "didn't know a thing about horns or instrumental music" and that he and Robert Lamm considered leaving the band around the time "What Kind of Man Would I Be?" was released.

== Charts ==
=== Weekly charts ===
| Chart (1990–91) | Peak position |
|---|---|
| Australia ARIA Charts | 157 |
| Canada RPM Adult Contemporary | 5 |
| Canada RPM Top Singles | 4 |
| Ireland (IRMA) | 14 |
| US Cash Box Top 100 | 5 |
| US Billboard Hot 100 | 5 |
| US Billboard Adult Contemporary | 2 |

=== Year-end charts ===
| Chart (1990) | Rank |
|---|---|
| Canada Top Singles (RPM) | 64 |
| US Billboard Hot 100 | 71 |
