= Chicago 19 =

Studio album by Chicago
- Released: June 20, 1988
- Recorded: Late 1987 – early 1988
- Studios: Record Plant (Los Angeles, CA); Secret Sound (Los Angeles, CA); A&M Studios (Hollywood, CA); Gold Mine (Woodland Hills, CA); Can-Am Recorders (Tarzana, CA)
- Genre: Rock
- Length: 44:24
- Labels: Full Moon; Reprise
- Producers: Ron Nevison; Chas Sandford

Chicago chronology
Chicago 18 (1986)	Chicago 19 (1988)	Greatest Hits 1982–1989 (1989)

Singles from Chicago 19
- 1. "I Don't Wanna Live Without Your Love" Released: May 20, 1988; 2. "Look Away" Released: September 9, 1988; 3. "You're Not Alone" Released: January 13, 1989; 4. "We Can Last Forever" Released: April 21, 1989

Professional ratings
Review scores
Source	Rating
AllMusic	2/5 stars

Chicago 19 is the sixteenth studio album (and nineteenth overall) by American rock band Chicago, released on June 20, 1988. After recording Chicago 18 with David Foster, the band worked primarily with producers Ron Nevison and Chas Sandford for this album. Their Full Moon Records imprint moved to Reprise Records. This is the first album to feature Dawayne Bailey as the band's new guitarist, and the final album to feature the band's original drummer Danny Seraphine, who was dismissed from the group in 1990.

== Background ==
With a reception similar to its predecessor, Chicago 19 became a success on the album chart, going platinum and yielding several hit singles. The album includes "Look Away" (No. 1), "I Don't Wanna Live Without Your Love" (No. 3), and "You're Not Alone" (No. 10). A remixed version of Jason Scheff's "What Kind of Man Would I Be?" (No. 5) would also be successful in late 1989 as part of the follow-up Greatest Hits 1982-1989 release. The album relied heavily on outside writers with five of its ten compositions. The first two singles were either written or co-written by Diane Warren, and the third by British-born songwriter Jimmy Scott.

After the tour for Chicago 19, original drummer Danny Seraphine was fired from the band for undisclosed reasons. Session drummer Tris Imboden then joined the band, in time to record "Explain It to My Heart" (the last song recorded for the album) on Twenty 1.

== Reception ==
Chicago 19 reached 37 in the US during a chart stay of 42 weeks. It did not chart in the UK.

== Track listing ==
Side one
No.	Title	Writer(s)	Vocals	Length
1.	"Heart in Pieces"	Tim Feehan, Brian MacLeod	Jason Scheff	5:04
2.	"I Don't Wanna Live Without Your Love"	Albert Hammond, Diane Warren	Bill Champlin	3:55
3.	"I Stand Up"	Robert Lamm, Gerard McMahon	Robert Lamm	4:06
4.	"We Can Last Forever"	Scheff, John Dexter	Scheff	3:45
5.	"Come in from the Night"	Champlin, Bruce Gaitsch	Champlin	4:43

Side two
No.	Title	Writer(s)	Vocals	Length
6.	"Look Away"	Diane Warren	Champlin	4:02
7.	"What Kind of Man Would I Be?"	Scheff, Chas Sandford, Bobby Caldwell	Scheff	4:21
8.	"Runaround"	Champlin, Scheff	Champlin and Scheff	4:10
9.	"You're Not Alone"	Jim Scott	Champlin	3:56
10.	"Victorious"	Marc Jordan, John Capek	Lamm	6:02

=== Outtakes ===
An alternate version of "Come in from the Night" exists called "Hide Behind the Window". A cover version of Otis Redding's "I Can't Turn You Loose" was intended for Chicago 19 and was performed live in July 1988. "Dancing in The Streets" was omitted, and performed in 1989 in Houston, Texas as part of an encore; Wilson Pickett's "In the Midnight Hour" was also performed at the same show.

== Personnel ==
=== Chicago ===
- Bill Champlin – keyboards, lead and backing vocals
- Robert Lamm – keyboards, lead and backing vocals
- Lee Loughnane – trumpet, brass arrangements
- James Pankow – trombone, brass arrangements
- Walter Parazaider – saxophone
- Jason Scheff – bass, lead and backing vocals
- Danny Seraphine – drums, percussion, programming
- Dawayne Bailey – guitar, backing vocals

=== Additional musicians ===
- Chas Sandford – guitars
- Dann Huff – guitars
- Phillip Ashley – keyboards
- John Campbell – keyboards
- Charles Judge – keyboards
- Kiki Ebsen – keyboards, programming
- Peter Kaye – programming
- Peter Maher – programming
- Mike Murphy – programming, cowbell, drum technician
- Efrain Toro – drum programming
- Paul Jamieson – drum technician
- Tamara Champlin – additional backing vocals
- Tim Feehan – additional backing vocals on "Heart In Pieces"

== Production ==
- Producers – Chas Sandford (Tracks 1, 3, 5, 7, 8 & 10); Ron Nevison (Tracks 2, 4, 6 & 9).
- Tracks 1, 3, 5, 7, 8, and 10 engineered by Gary McGachan and Chas Sandford, assisted by Daren Chadwick.
- Tracks 2, 4, 6, and 9 engineered by Ron Nevison, assisted by Nick Basich, Michael E. Hutchinson, Stan Katayama, Jeff Poe and Bob Vogt.
- Mixed by James Guthrie, Chas Sandford and Greg Walsh.
- Recorded and Mixed at Record Plant and Secret Sound (Los Angeles, CA); A&M Studios (Hollywood, CA); Gold Mine (Woodland Hills, CA); Can-Am Recorders (Tarzana, CA).
- Production Assistant to Ron Nevison – Deandra Miller
- Production Assistant to Chas Sandford – Lisa M. Allen
- Art Direction and Design – Janet Levinson
- Computer Illustration –Jim Hillin for deGraf/Wahrman Inc.
- Direction – Howard Kaufman for Front Line Management

The album makes extensive use of the then popular Roland D-50 synthesizer presets. For example: "I Don't Wanna Live Without Your Love" with "Pressure Me Strings" and "Look Away" with PCM E-Piano.

== Charts ==
Chart (1988)	Peak position
Canada Top Albums/CDs (RPM)	38
Finnish Albums (The Official Finnish Charts)	39
German Albums (Offizielle Top 100)	42
Japanese Albums (Oricon)	16
Norwegian Albums (VG-lista)	5
Swedish Albums (Sverigetopplistan)	7
Swiss Albums (Schweizer Hitparade)	22
US Billboard 200	37

== Certifications ==
Region	Certification	Certified units/sales
United States (RIAA)	Platinum	1,000,000^{^}
^{^} Shipments figures based on certification alone.
