= You're Not Alone (Chicago song) =

Single by Chicago

from the album Chicago 19
- B-side: "It's Alright"
- Released: January 13, 1989
- Recorded: 1988
- Genre: Rock
- Length: 3:56
- Label: Full Moon; Reprise
- Songwriter: Jim Scott
- Producer: Ron Nevison

Chicago singles chronology
"Look Away" (1988)	"You're Not Alone" (1989)	"We Can Last Forever" (1989)

"You're Not Alone" is a song written by Jim Scott and recorded by the band Chicago for their 1988 album Chicago 19, with Bill Champlin singing lead vocals. When released as a single early the following year, the song peaked at No. 10 on the US Billboard Hot 100 and No. 9 on the US Cash Box Top 100.

There are two versions of the song: the album version and a radio remix with additional production. The radio remix version features more prominent guitar work by studio guitarist Dann Huff.

For the week of 28 January 1989, "You're Not Alone" was the most added song to contemporary hit radio stations reporting to Billboard. A music video was created for the song, which was directed by Richard Levine and produced by David Naylor. The music video was filmed at Raleigh Studios and includes a mixture of performance footage and exterior shots.

== Charts ==
Weekly chart performance for "You're Not Alone"
Chart (1989)	Peak position
Canada Top Singles (RPM)	22
US Billboard Hot 100	10
US Adult Contemporary (Billboard)	9
