= Dawayne Bailey =

American guitarist

- Born: October 3, 1954; Manhattan, Kansas, U.S.
- Genres: Rock, Pop
- Occupation: Musician
- Instruments: Guitar, Vocals
- Years active: 1966–present
- Labels: Full Moon/Warner Brothers, Rhino
- Website: www.dawaynebailey.com

Dawayne Bailey is an American guitarist who has toured and recorded with Bob Seger & the Silver Bullet Band, Véronique Sanson, and Chicago.

Bailey was born and raised in Manhattan, Kansas. While still attending Manhattan High School in Kansas, he founded the band Rathbone, which developed a strong regional fan base. In 1972, Bailey and Rathbone moved to Los Angeles to foster their musical career.

== Career ==
Bailey released his first solo recording in 1982, a 45 rpm single of his song "Revenge of the Nurds". The release was suggested by Gerry Fialka, Bailey's first manager who was also executive producer.

Bailey then joined Gerard McMahon's band in summer 1982 and recorded No Looking Back on Full Moon/Warner Bros. which was released in 1983. While playing live shows with McMahon's band, Bailey was requested by Bob Seger's office to fly to Detroit and audition for Seger & The Silver Bullet Band. Bailey joined Seger's band in February 1983 and sang backing vocals and played lead guitar on Seger's The Distance tour, recorded Seger's Like a Rock album and performed in several videos.

Bailey then formed his own band called Private Parts and in 1986 recorded their debut album, called Dancing The Marmara. It was during this time that Bailey's former bandmate Jason Scheff called him to audition for the lead guitarist spot in Chicago. Bailey toured and recorded with Chicago from July 1986 to January 1995, and was a contributor to their previously unreleased album, which was intended in 1994 to be titled Stone of Sisyphus. He composed the title track for that album - he also shares lead vocals with Robert Lamm and plays all guitars on the title track, as well as composed another track called "Get On This". The latter was not included on the eventual June 2008 Rhino Records release of Chicago XXXII: Stone of Sisyphus for unknown reasons.

After Chicago, Bailey remained in Los Angeles and went on to perform and record with various original projects such as Shayna, Belly Puddle (featuring Jason Scheff's brother Lauren), and Bailey's own Goblin Girl Records releases. Bailey then toured and recorded with French legend Véronique Sanson in 1998 and 1999.

In October 2006, Bailey released the studio album, Joyland, on his Goblin Girl label. He performed nearly all of the instrumentation and vocals, as well as assuming the majority of production duties. He also released Sketch, a compilation of demos, unreleased material, and other miscellaneous tracks.

In March 2007, Bailey was inducted into the Kansas Music Hall of Fame. In February 2012, Bailey was inducted into the Manhattan High School hall of fame.

Many of Bailey's contributions to Chicago were documented with many of his quotations, in the book The Greatest Music Never Sold, chronicling the development of what became Chicago XXXII: Stone of Sisyphus. His observations and advice about the general lifestyle of the touring musician is quoted in the book Musician's Survival Guide to Life on the Road.

Sisyphus believed he could tackle that rock one more time ... and that's the kind of faith you have to have in yourself and your work.

— Dawayne Bailey: composer, guitarist, lyricist, and vocalist on Chicago's Stone of Sisyphus

== Discography ==
Year	Artist	Album	Credit
1982	Dawayne Bailey	Revenge Of The Nurds; The Captain Beefheart Ceremonial Shuffle	
1983	Gerard McMahon	No Looking Back	
1983	Gerard McMahon	The Lonely Guy [Soundtrack]	
1984	Dawayne Bailey	Vicious Raisonettes	
1986	Private Parts	Dancing The Marmara	
1986	Bob Seger	Like A Rock	
1988	Chicago	Chicago 19	
1989	Chicago	Greatest Hits - 1982-1989	
1990	Chicago	Days of Thunder [Soundtrack]	
1991	Chicago	Twenty 1	
1991	The Usual Suspects	The Usual Suspects	
1991	Stuart Hamm	The Urge	
1992	Raise The World	The Album Of L.I.F.E.	
1994	Bob Seger	Greatest Hits, Vol. 1	
1994	Robert Lamm	Life is Good in My Neighborhood	
1995	Dawayne Bailey	The Living Room of Me	
1996	Chicago	Overtime	
1996	Dawayne Bailey	A Black Church In Marietta	
1997	Pat Boone	In a Metal Mood	
1997	Chicago	Heart of Chicago - Vol 1 & 2	
1997	Dawayne Bailey	Beautiful Ruins	
1997	Dawayne Bailey	Shayna	
1998	Dawayne Bailey	Belly Puddle	
1998	Chicago	Heart of Chicago - Vol 3 & 4	
1998	Jeff Duff	Kiss My Apocalypse	
1999	Véronique Sanson	D'UN PAPILLON À UNE ÉTOILE	
2001	Véronique Sanson	Les Moments Importants	
2002	Dawayne Bailey	sketch	
2003	Cardboard Cyndi	Cardboard Cyndi	
2003	Bob Seger	Greatest Hits, Vol. 2	
2003	Chicago	The Box (Rhino/Warners)	
2004	Robert Lamm	Too Many Voices	
2005	Chicago	Love Songs	
2006	Dawayne Bailey	Joyland	
2006	Bob Seger	Essential Seger	
2007	Chicago	40th Anniversary	
2007	Veronique Sanson	Petits Moments Choisis	
2008	Chicago	The Heart of Chicago; MVI DVD - Rhino/WEA	
2008	Chicago	Chicago XXXII: Stone of Sisyphus	composer, guitarist, lyricist, vocalist
2008	Véronique Sanson	Et voila - And That The Complete; 1967-2007 (22 CD-4 DVD)	
2008	Veronique Sanson	Indestructible - Edition Deluxe Remastered Bonus Tracks	
2009	Chicago	Collectors Edition 3-CD Metal Box	
2009	Bob Seger	Early Seger/Volume 1	
2011	Bob Seger	Ultimate Hits: Rock And Roll Never Forgets	
2014	Debra Goodrich Bisel	Kansas Music: Stories of A Rich Tradition	book
2015	Chicago	The Studio Albums 1979-2008/Vol Two 10 CD Box	Rhino
2018	Chicago	VI Decades Live	Rhino

== Videography ==
Year	Artist	Title	Credit
1989	Chicago	Live at the Budokan	
1992	Chicago	And The Band Played On	
1993	Chicago	Live at the Greek Theater	
2016	Chicago	Now More Than Ever - The History of Chicago	
