= Look Away =

1988 single by Chicago

Single by Chicago

from the album Chicago 19
- B-side: "Come In from the Night"
- Released: September 9, 1988
- Genre: Rock
- Length: 4:02
- Label: Full Moon; Reprise
- Songwriter: Diane Warren
- Producer: Ron Nevison

Chicago singles chronology
"I Don't Wanna Live Without Your Love" (1988)	"Look Away" (1988)	"You're Not Alone" (1989)

"Look Away" is a song by American rock band Chicago. Written by Diane Warren and produced by Ron Nevison, the ballad is the second single from the band's 1988 album Chicago 19. "Look Away" topped the US Billboard Hot 100 for two weeks in December 1988, becoming the group's third and final No. 1 hit and ending 1989 at No. 1 on the Hot 100 year-end chart. Worldwide, it peaked at No. 1 in Canada and entered the top 20 in Belgium, the Netherlands, and Sweden.

== Production ==
According to drummer Danny Seraphine, Chicago's manager Howard Kaufman suggested that the band bring in outside songwriting help. Kaufman recommended Diane Warren, who also composed the band's single "I Don't Wanna Live Without Your Love," and producer Ron Nevison, who had worked with Heart on the No. 1 hits "These Dreams" and "Alone."

Warren wrote "Look Away" from the man's perspective and submitted a demo to Chicago's management company. "Diane's demos always sound really good," Nevison said. "Her demos are always very simple, but they always have great vocal performances." Bassist Jason Scheff remarked that "the songs that last for me are the ones I don't get at first. I remember hearing 'Look Away' and thinking it's okay, but not great. Thank God I'm not an A&R man."

Before being submitted to Chicago, the song was one of two ballads offered by Epic Records to Cheap Trick, who chose "The Flame" instead. The track was also offered to Europe, but was turned down due to frontman Joey Tempest's refusal to record material written by outside writers.

The song featured Bill Champlin on lead vocals and furthered Chicago's shift towards de-emphasizing the band's brass section compared to their earlier years. Scheff noted that with Peter Cetera having left the group and "making his own records, it was good for us to release some songs with a different sound (like) Bill's voice. Then we wouldn't be saturating radio with Chicago-sounding songs."

== Reception ==
Chicago "Look Away" (1988)
25-second sample of Chicago's "Look Away".

"Look Away" entered the US Billboard Hot 100 singles chart in September 1988 and reached No. 1, where it spent two weeks in December. Champlin said he was unaware of the feat at the time. "Everybody said, 'I hear your song every day,'" he recalled. "I go, 'What song?' I was kind of oblivious to the whole thing, busy working on new stuff. That's what happens. As everybody else gets aware of what you're doing, you're usually about five or six tunes past it." The single was certified gold in January 1989 and was 1989's most successful song on the Hot 100. It also reached No. 1 on the Adult Contemporary chart. Outside the US, "Look Away" peaked at No. 1 in Canada, No. 9 in the Netherlands, No. 15 in Sweden, and No. 20 in Belgium.

In 2018, a British man, Brendan Greaves, claimed he is the author of the song and launched legal proceedings. The case was dismissed only a few months afterward.

== Track listing ==
7-inch vinyl and cassette

No.	Title	Writer(s)	Length
1.	"Look Away"	Diane Warren	3:59
2.	"Come In from the Night"	Bill Champlin, Bruce Gaitsch	4:39

== Charts ==
=== Weekly charts ===
Weekly chart performance for "Look Away"
Chart (1988–1990)	Peak position
Australia (ARIA)	80
Belgium (Ultratop 50 Flanders)	20
Canada Top Singles (RPM)	1
Netherlands (Dutch Top 40)	9
Netherlands (Single Top 100)	10
Sweden (Sverigetopplistan)	15
UK Singles (Official Charts)	77
US Billboard Hot 100	1
US Adult Contemporary (Billboard)	1
US Cash Box Top 100	1

=== Year-end charts ===
Year-end chart performance for "Look Away"
Chart (1988)	Position
Canada Top Singles (RPM)	79

Chart (1989)	Position
US Billboard Hot 100	1
US Adult Contemporary (Billboard)	32

Chart (1990)	Position
Netherlands (Dutch Top 40)	79

== Certifications ==
Certifications for "Look Away"
Region	Certification	Certified units/sales
United States (RIAA)	Gold	500,000^{^}
^{^} Shipments figures based on certification alone.

== Release history ==
Release dates and formats for "Look Away"
Region	Date	Format(s)	Label(s)	Ref.
United States	September 9, 1988	7-inch vinyl; cassette	Reprise; Full Moon	
Japan	October 10, 1988	Mini-CD	Reprise; Full Moon	
United Kingdom	December 12, 1988	7-inch vinyl; 12-inch vinyl; mini-CD	Reprise; Full Moon	

== See also ==
- List of Hot Adult Contemporary number ones of 1988
