= I Don't Wanna Live Without Your Love =

1988 single by Chicago

Single by Chicago

from the album Chicago 19
- B-side: "I Stand Up"
- Released: May 20, 1988
- Recorded: 1988
- Genre: Soft rock
- Length: 3:54 (album version); 3:56 (AC mix)
- Label: Full Moon; Reprise
- Songwriters: Diane Warren; Albert Hammond
- Producer: Ron Nevison

Chicago singles chronology
"Niagara Falls" (1987)	"I Don't Wanna Live Without Your Love" (1988)	"Look Away" (1988)

"I Don't Wanna Live Without Your Love" is a hit song written by Diane Warren and Albert Hammond for the group Chicago and recorded for their album Chicago 19 (1988), with Bill Champlin singing lead vocals. It is the first Chicago single to feature Champlin performing all lead vocals himself. The first single released from Chicago 19, it reached number three on the U.S. Billboard Hot 100 chart. The B-side of the single was "I Stand Up" written by Robert Lamm and Gerard McMahon. The song was featured in the Netflix original movie Death Note, which is based on the anime of the same name.

"I Don't Wanna Live Without Your Love' was the band's first single released on Reprise Records.

== Charts ==
=== Weekly charts ===
Chart (1988)	Peak position
Australia (Kent Music Report)	50
Canada Top Singles (RPM)	4
France (IFOP)	99
Italy Airplay (Music & Media)	4
US Billboard Hot 100	3
US Cash Box Top 100	5

=== Year-end charts ===
Chart (1988)	Position
US Billboard Hot 100	48
US Cash Box Top 100	40
