= The Keane Brothers =

American pop music duo

- Origin: USA
- Years active: 1976–1982
- Members: John M. Keane; Tom Keane

The Keane Brothers was an American pop music duo from 1976–82, composed of pre-teens, Tom Keane on piano and John Keane on drums. The duo released four albums and briefly hosted a television variety show on CBS. The brothers subsequently went on to solo careers as songwriters and music producers.

== History ==
Tom and John Keane of Los Angeles, California, were the sons of Bob Keane, the founder of Del-Fi Records. After the elder Keane closed his record label, he promoted the boys as a bubblegum pop band.

The Keane Brothers’ first single, “Sherry” (#84), was released in 1976, followed closely by a self-titled debut album in 1977. During the summer of 1977, John who was 12 years and Tom who was 13 years, reportedly became the youngest people ever to host a prime-time variety television program. The Keane Brothers Show aired on CBS for four weeks in 1977 as a summer replacement for Wonder Woman.

Between the years of 1977 and 1982, the brothers released four albums. Their second album, Taking Off, was released in 1978 with a disco sound and produced by songwriter Lamont Dozier. In 1981, the group added Mark Moulin on guitars and Mike Millwood on bass and shortened its name to Keane. The third album was titled Keane.

In 1982, the group released the album Today, Tomorrow And Tonight with Moulin and future Chicago member Jason Scheff on bass. The brothers disbanded the duo, and instead pursued solo careers.

The band is not to be confused with the 2000s pop rock band of the same name.

=== John M. Keane ===
John Keane (born April 26, 1965) composes music for television, including The Sentinel, CSI: Crime Scene Investigation and The Amazing Race. For the CSI series, Keane was nominated for the 2007 Emmy as well as 12 BMI and ASCAP awards.

He became a session drummer in Los Angeles, recording music with various musicians including Chicago, Michael Bolton, David Foster and Cher. He released two solo albums: Any Other World in 1996 and Straight Away in 1999. In 2010, John released a solo album on Laycut Records titled Everything Changed.

=== Tom Keane ===
Tom Keane (born March 13, 1964) has collaborated as writer and musician with many producers and artists, including Burt Bacharach, Kenny Rogers, Patti LaBelle, and Al Jarreau. He received a Grammy nomination for Chaka Khan's hit “Through the Fire”, which he co-wrote with David Foster and Cynthia Weil (of “You’ve Lost That Lovin’ Feelin’” fame) and a Golden Globe nomination for the soundtrack to the 1987 film, The Secret of My Success.

The song “Will You Still Love Me?”, recorded by Chicago, who had recently added Tom’s former Keane bandmate, Jason Scheff, to the lineup, was co-written by Tom, David Foster and Richard Baskin. Scheff performed lead vocals on the track, which became a big hit.

Tom Keane issued a pair of solo albums in the early 2000s. In 2000, he released I Love a Gershwin Tune, which features covers of several classic works by George Gershwin. A second album featuring his own versions of songs he had written, Smoove and Juicy Covers followed in 2001. Tracks on this latter album include Keane's own take on his compositions “Will You Still Love Me?” as well as “Through the Fire”.

In 2007, he opened a production company called DMG-Del-Fi Music Group. 2011 saw the release of Hoodwinked Too! Hood vs. Evil a Weinstein Company animated feature release, the sequel to the 2005 release, Hoodwinked!. Tom wrote and produced the two pop songs in the film sung by Hayden Panettiere of Heroes fame.

Tom's son, Mack Keane has become a recording artist in his own right.

== Discography ==
Albums

- The Keane Brothers (1977)
- Taking Off (1979)
- Keane (1981)
- Today, Tomorrow & Tonight (1982)

== Soundtracks ==
Film

- Zapped! (1982)
- Two of a Kind (1983)
- Kidd Video (1984)
- St. Elmo’s Fire (1985)
- White Nights (1985)
- The Secret of My Succe$s (1987)
- Win Win (2011)
- Hoodwinked Too! Hood vs. Evil (2011)
- Spotlight (2015)

Anime

- One Pound Gospel (1988) (Theme Song Arrangements)
- After War Gundam X (1996) (music and arrangements for ending theme songs)
- Chōja Reideen (1996) (main composer with Kiyoshi Murakami)
- The Dog of Flanders (1997) (composer for ending theme "When I Cry")
- Silent Möbius (1998) (composer for second ending theme song)
