= Bill Champlin =

American musician (born 1947)

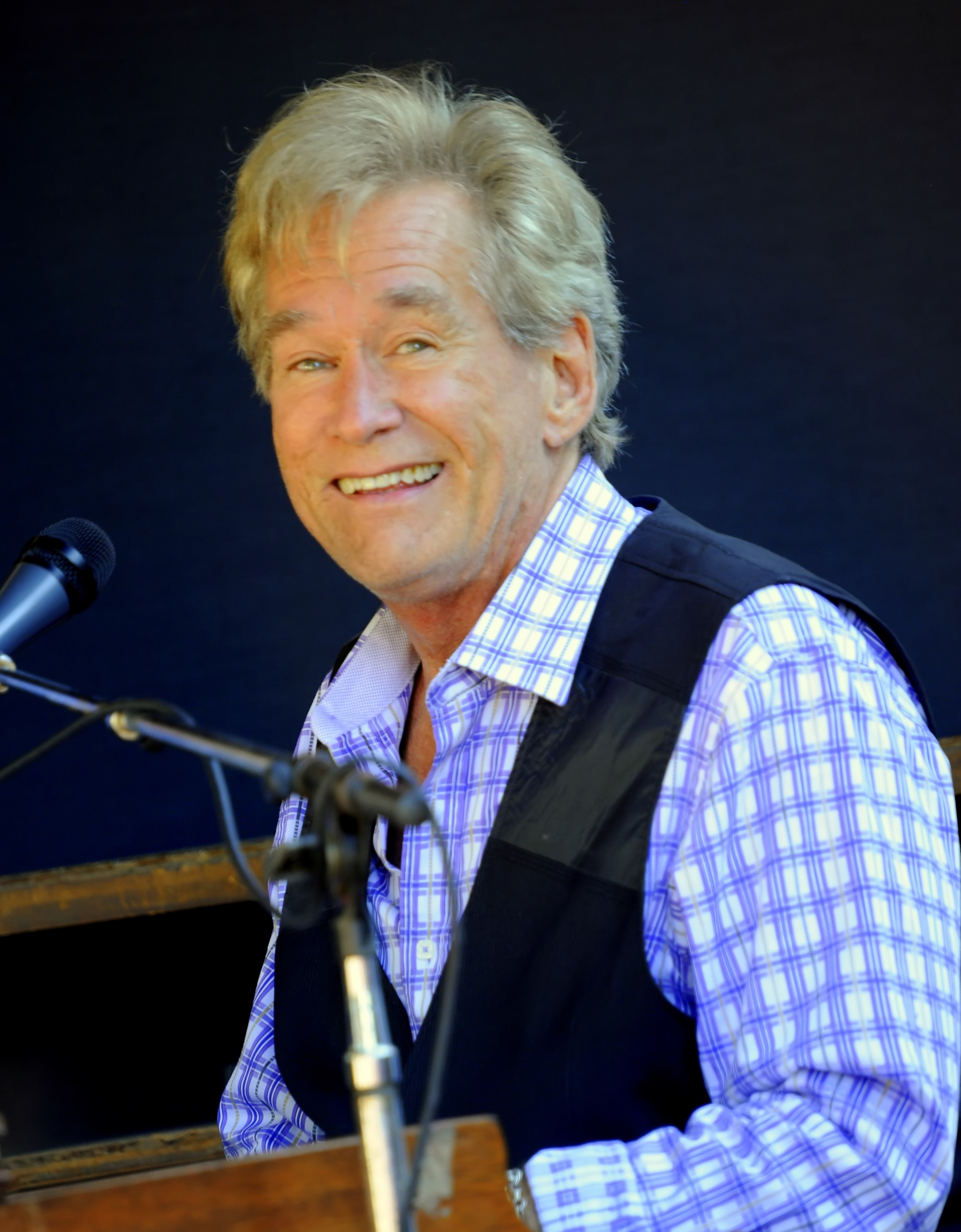
- Champlin performing in 2015

Background information
- Born: William Bradford Champlin; May 21, 1947 (age 79); Oakland, California, U.S.
- Genres: Rock; blues; R&B
- Occupations: Singer; musician; songwriter; arranger; producer
- Instruments: Vocals; keyboards; guitar
- Years active: 1967–present
- Label: Elektra
- Member of: Sons of Champlin
- Formerly of: Chicago
- Website: billchamplin.com

William Bradford Champlin (born May 21, 1947) is an American singer, keyboardist, guitarist and songwriter. He formed the band Sons of Champlin in 1965, which still performs today, and was a member of the rock band Chicago from 1981 to 2009. He performed lead vocals on three of Chicago's biggest hits of the 1980s, 1984's "Hard Habit to Break" (a duet with fellow member Peter Cetera) and 1988's "Look Away" and "I Don't Wanna Live Without Your Love". During live shows, he sang the songs originally performed by founding guitarist Terry Kath, who had died in 1978. He has won multiple Grammy Awards for songwriting.

== Early career ==
As a child, Champlin demonstrated a talent for piano and eventually picked up the guitar after being inspired by Elvis Presley. He started a band called The Opposite Six while at Tamalpais High School in Mill Valley, California. He then studied music in college, but was encouraged by a professor to drop out and pursue music professionally.

== The Sons of Champlin and solo career ==
The Opposite Six, Champlin's band from high school, had changed their name to the Sons of Champlin and had recorded a number of well-reviewed (although not commercially successful) albums (including Loosen Up Naturally and Circle Filled With Love) by 1977, when 30-year-old Champlin moved to Los Angeles. During the 1969–1970 period, Champlin was uncertain of the future of the Sons of Champlin, so he joined with Jerry Miller of Moby Grape in The Rhythm Dukes, following the departure of Don Stevenson. The band achieved a significant degree of acclaim as an opening act for many popular performers of that time, and recorded one album, ultimately released in 2005 "Flashback".

In LA he began extensive studio session work. He was especially in demand for his singing, appearing on hundreds of recordings throughout the 1970s and 1980s. The National Association of Recording Arts and Sciences (NARAS) awarded Champlin the Most Valuable Player peer award for male background vocalists in 1980.

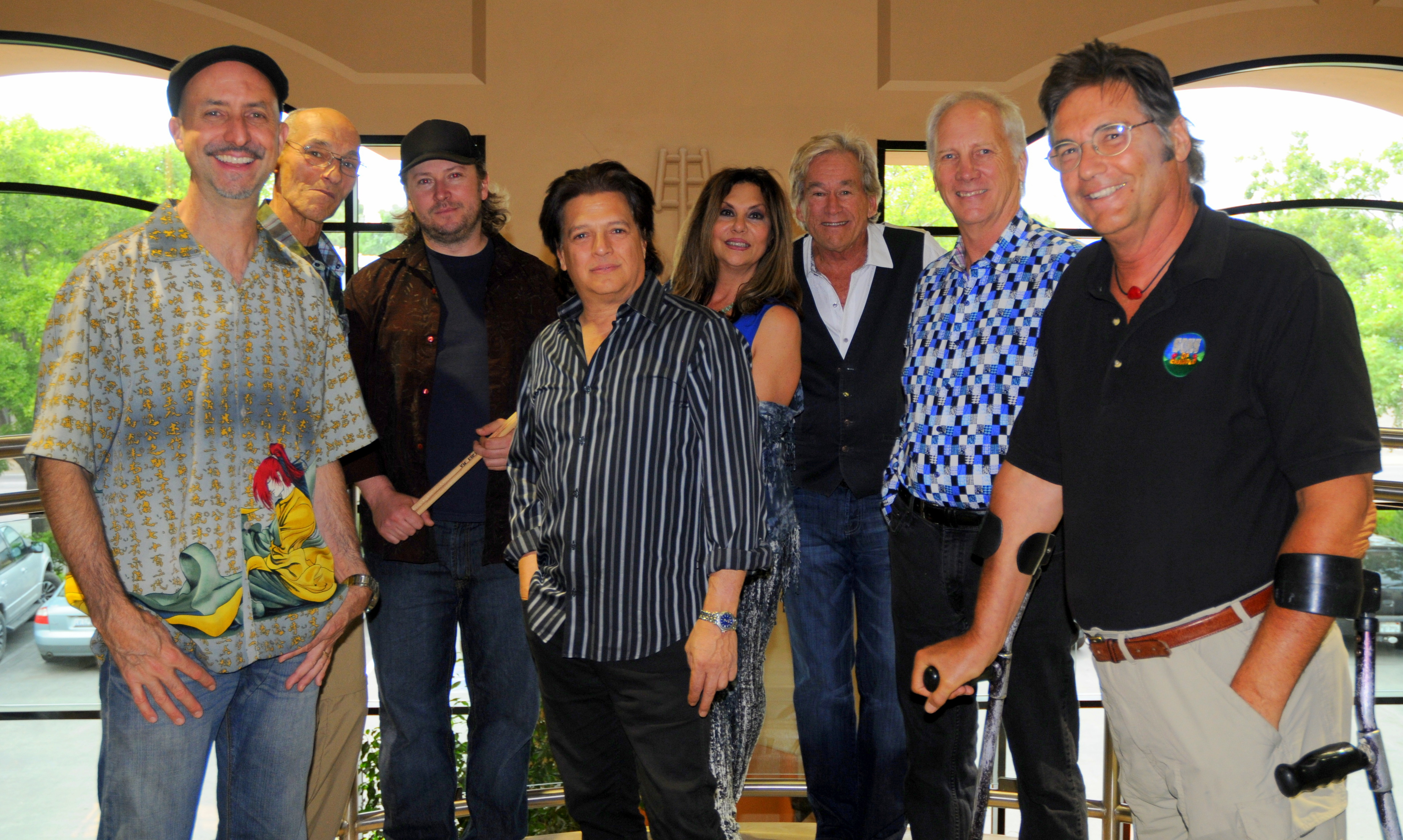
Sons of Champlin in 2015

Champlin won a Grammy Award for Best Rhythm and Blues Song in 1980 for co-writing the hit song "After The Love Has Gone" with Jay Graydon and David Foster (which was made popular by Earth, Wind & Fire) and a second Grammy Award for Best Rhythm and Blues Song in 1983 for co-writing the song "Turn Your Love Around" with Jay Graydon and Steve Lukather (which was made popular by George Benson).

In 1979, Champlin was approached by the then-widely successful band REO Speedwagon to add background vocals on some of their songs appearing on their album Nine Lives; which was the last album in which REO Speedwagon had a predominantly hard-rock edge.

This work allowed Champlin to become acquainted with other in-demand session men such as Jay Graydon, David Foster, and Steve Lukather (of Toto). Among other artists that he worked with were Al Jarreau, George Duke, Boz Scaggs, Elton John, The Tubes, Lee Ritenour, Amy Grant, and Nicky Trebek. He also appeared on Barry Manilow's 1982 EP, Oh, Julie! and was a featured background vocalist on Manilow's Here Comes the Night.

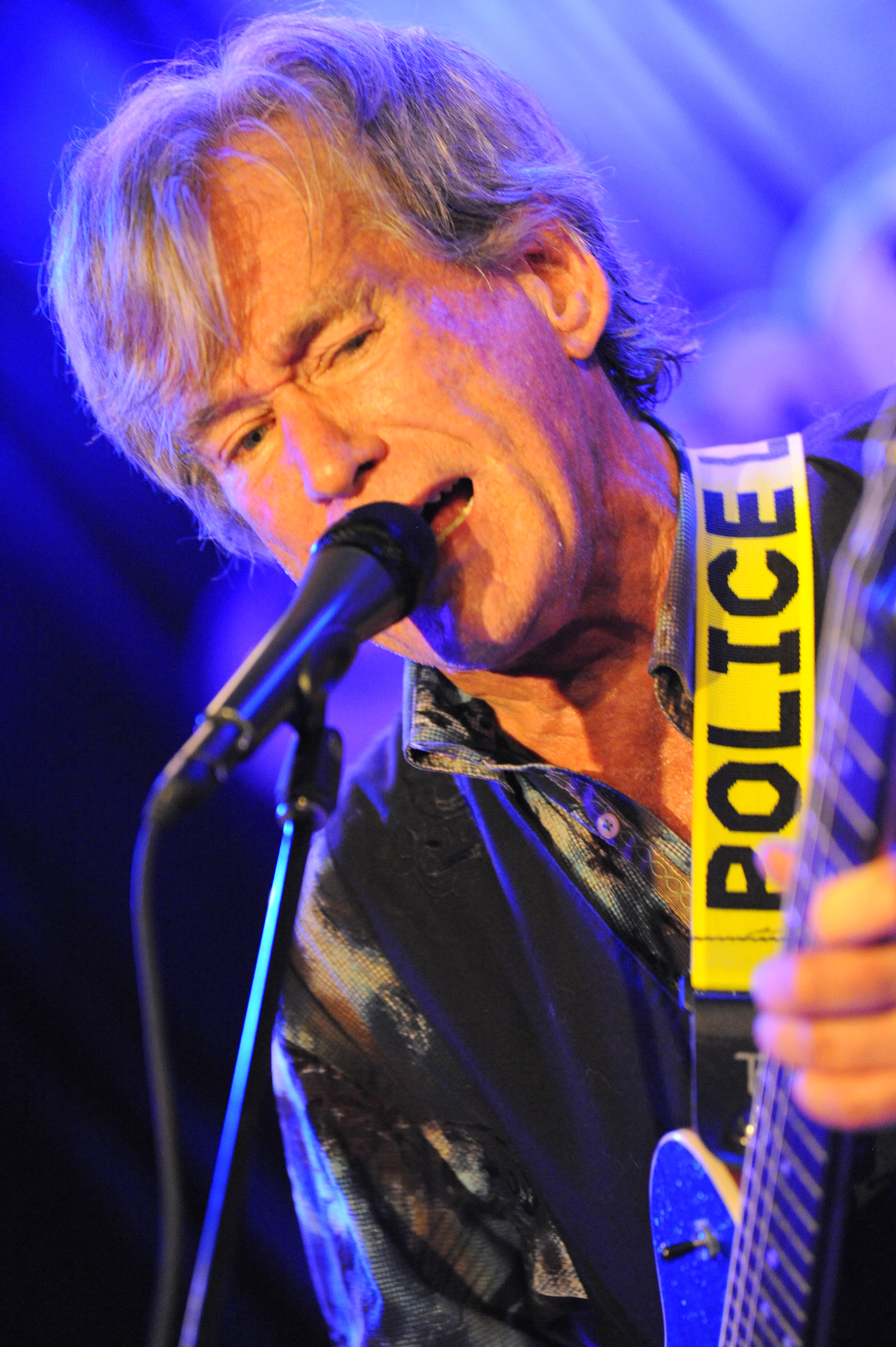
Champlin performing in 2017

In 1986, Champlin dueted with Patti LaBelle on Last Unbroken Heart for Miami Vice, which was released that same year on the album "Miami Vice II"

In 1991, he provided backing vocals for Kim Carnes' album Checkin' Out the Ghosts (released only in Japan); in 1997, Champlin revived the Sons of Champlin and continued to play with them between tours with Chicago. Throughout the 1990s he released several solo albums and toured Europe and Japan in support of his live solo album "Mayday". In 2009 Champlin collaborated with the Italian-American composer, arranger, singer, actor, and producer Manuel De Peppe and in 2011, Champlin played the Hammond B3 organ on the songs "Moon Cry" and "Mississippi Creek" by Curt Campbell and the Eclectic Beast Band.

He and second wife, singer/songwriter Tamara Champlin, were part of the Scandinavian tour headlined by Leon Russell that also featured Joe Williams and Peter Friestedt. Champlin teamed up with conductor Lars Erik Gudim and the Norwegian Radio Orchestra (KORK) in Oslo, Norway for a special performance that aired December 27, 2011 on NRK TV in Norway. From 2014 to 2017 he performed several acoustic shows with Tamara Champlin in the U.S., Europe, Japan, and South and Central America, where they joined the Rock Pack Tour, guested with California Transit Authority featuring Danny Seraphine, played concerts to benefit Eddie Tuduri's Rhythmic Arts Project with the Pockets. They entertained with other indie artists for the Lone Wolf Entertainment Foundation and rejoined the re-formed Sons of Champlin for a series of shows in the Northwest. In 2017, he and Tamara were part of the Ambrosia & Friends Tour.

=== Solo releases ===
David Foster produced two solo albums for Champlin: Single (1978) and Runaway (1981). Both albums sold poorly due to lack of adequate promotion by his record company, although the latter album did include a pair of minor hits on the Billboard Hot 100 ("Sara" and "Tonight, Tonight"). In the 1990s, Champlin released five more solo albums: No Wasted Moments, Burn Down the Night, Through It All, He Started to Sing, and Mayday. The last was a live recording of songs from his career, and included musicians Greg Mathieson, Jerry Lopez, Eddie Garcia, Tom Saviano, and Rochon Westmoreland.

In September, 2008, Champlin released No Place Left To Fall and a companion DVD in Japan on JVC/Victor. The record was produced by Champlin and Mark Eddinger, and featured musicians Bruce Gaitsch, George Hawkins, Jr., Billy Ward, Tamara Champlin, Will Champlin, and Eddinger, with guest appearances by Steve Lukather, Peter Cetera, Michael English, Jerry Lopez, and enlisted such songwriting/player greats as Jay Graydon, Andreas Carlsson, Diane Warren, Michael Caruso, Tom Saviano, and Dennis Matkosky. The record was released in Europe by Zinc Music in December, 2008, and in the U.S. by DreamMakers Music in August, 2009.

In January, 2021, Champlin's solo album Livin For Love was released by Imagen Records and featured Champlin on keyboard and guitars as well as players Bruce Gaitsch, Carmen Grillo, Steve Porcaro, Vinnie Colaiuta, George Hawkins Jr., Greg Mathieson, Gordon Campbell, Lenny Castro, Marc Russo, Alan Hertz, Tal Morris, Jason Scheff, and Abraham Laboriel. Singers included Bill Champlin on lead and background vocals, Tamara Champlin, Gary Falcone, Jason Scheff, and Andreas Carlsson. Tracks were composed by Bill Champlin, Tamara Champlin, Bruce Gaitsch, Michael Caruso, Greg Mathieson, Jason Scheff, and Gary Falcone.

== Tenure with Chicago ==
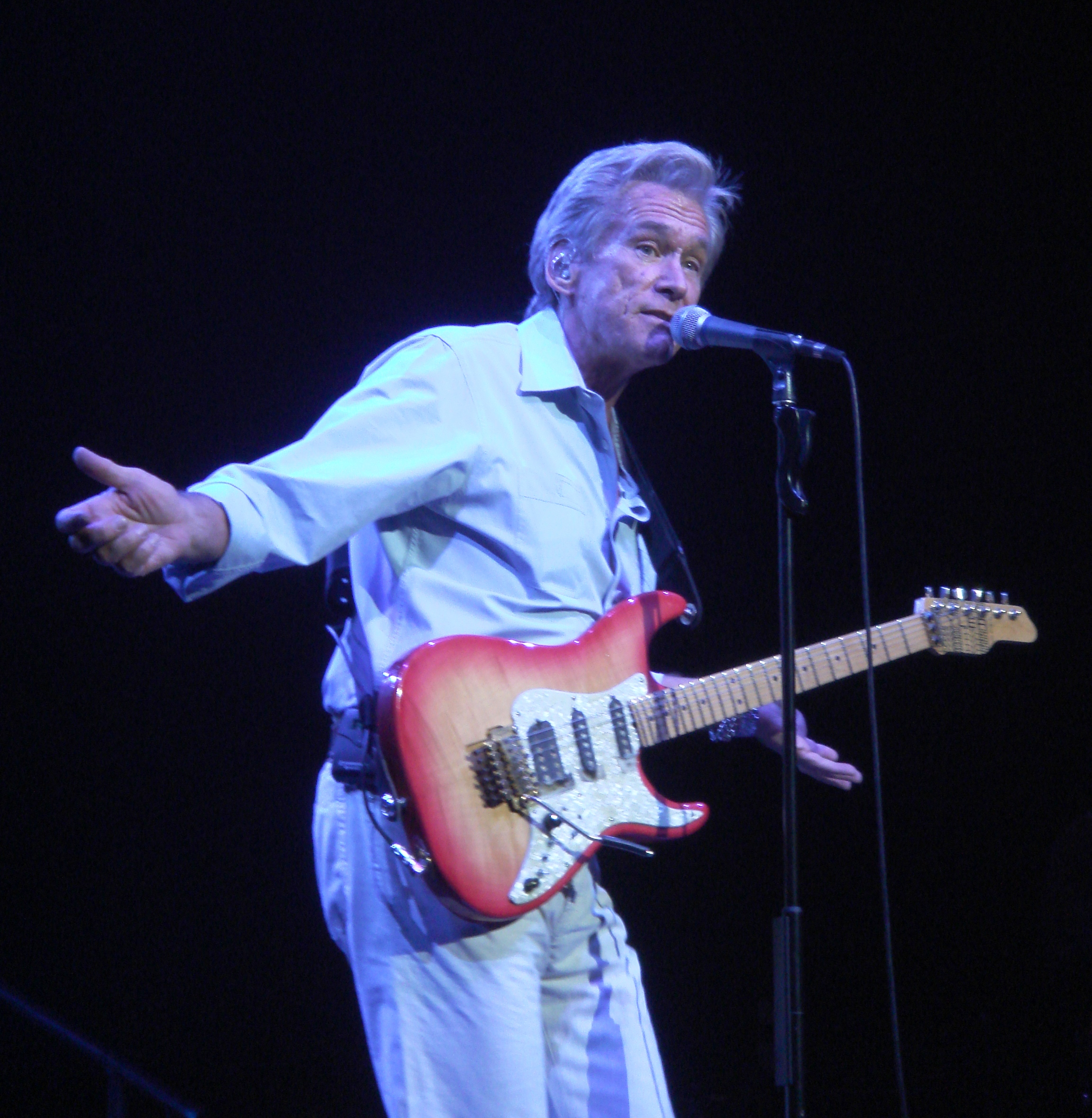
Champlin performing with Chicago in 2008

In 1978, the day after Chicago guitarist Terry Kath died, the band reached out to Champlin suggesting that he audition to take Kath's place. Champlin turned down the offer, saying he could not fill that role.

In early 1981, Champlin collaborated with Chicago's drummer, Danny Seraphine, by singing some backgrounds with Peter Cetera on a non-Chicago project. Seraphine and Champlin co-wrote a few songs for Chicago that year, and Champlin was invited to sing one of those songs, "Sonny Think Twice", as a guest vocalist. Champlin suggested to Seraphine that David Foster might be a good choice as a producer for Chicago at that time. Seraphine began a campaign to get Champlin into the group, and he joined before the end of 1981.

The band did collaborate with Foster on their next album, 1982's platinum certified Chicago 16. Champlin was featured singing several songs, including "Bad Advice", "Follow Me", and "Sonny Think Twice". Champlin also shared vocals with Cetera on "Waiting for You to Decide".

1984's Chicago 17 enhanced Champlin's presence in the group, when he wrote several songs ("Please Hold On" and "Remember the Feeling") and sang (with Cetera) the hit single "Hard Habit to Break".

In 1988, Champlin's voice appeared prominently on several major hit singles from Chicago 19: "Look Away", "I Don't Wanna Live Without Your Love", and "You're Not Alone".That year, he also sang the theme to the television show In the Heat of the Night.

In 1990, Champlin wrote, produced, and sang lead on "Hearts in Trouble", a song for the movie soundtrack of Days of Thunder. Originally a solo song, the producers of the movie decided, for marketing purposes, that it be released under the name of Chicago. The band's horn section added a brass arrangement to the track, and subsequently it was released as a single. In the summer of 1990, Chicago launched its Hearts in Trouble Tour.

In 1991, Chicago released the album Twenty 1, featuring the Champlin-sung hit "Chasin' the Wind", which peaked at No. 39 on the Billboard Hot 100, the band's last top 40 hit on that chart.

In 1993, Chicago recorded its "lost album", not released until 2008 as Chicago XXXII: Stone of Sisyphus. Champlin sings on the tracks "Mah-Jong", "Cry for The Lost", "The Show Must Go On", and "Plaid".

Champlin made major contributions to Chicago's big-band tribute Night & Day Big Band in 1995 and to the 1998 Christmas album Chicago XXV: The Christmas Album, including the additional track "What's It Gonna Be, Santa?" on the album's 2003 re-release. Champlin co-wrote four of the songs on the band's 2006 album Chicago XXX.

In 2009, Chicago and Champlin announced he would be leaving the group during the band's summer tour with Earth, Wind & Fire. Chicago's management released a statement saying, "Bill Champlin is no longer in Chicago. He was a long time-band member and we wish him all the best as he embarks on his new solo project, for which he's worked long and hard". A statement by Champlin's publicist said, "After 28 years with Chicago, singer-songwriter-keyboardist Bill Champlin is parting ways with the classic jazz/rock band to focus once again on his solo career". Later, Champlin would state that the abrupt decision was a surprise to him, and that he had no input in it.

== Bill Champlin and WunderGround ==
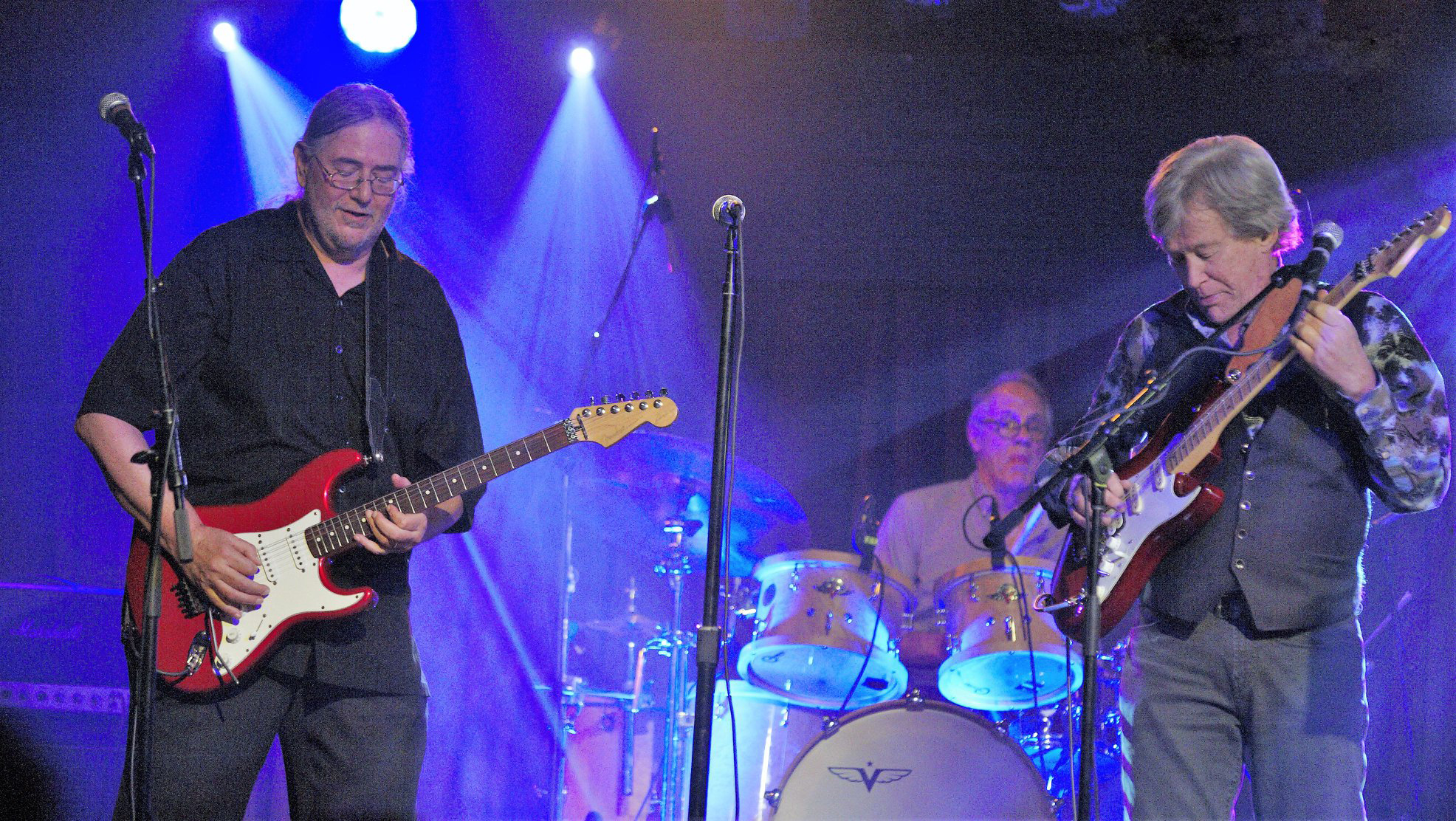
Bill Champlin and Wunderground performing in 2019

Champlin formed a band in 2018, entitled "Bill Champlin and the WunderGround" that included members singer-guitarist Gary Falcone; singer Tamara Champlin; bass player Bill Bodine; Ambrosia's drummer Burleigh Drummond; and keyboardist-singer Mary Harris, releasing an album Bleeding Secrets and playing shows in the Los Angeles, California area, to promote and support the music.

== Champlin Williams Friestedt ==
In 2012 Champlin joined Joseph Williams and Peter Friestedt, who had been previously releasing an album under the name Williams Friestedt in 2011, for a European tour. As a result of the tour, a Live DVD/CD, recorded in Gothenburg on March 25, 2012, was released under the name "Bill Champlin Joseph Williams Peter Friestedt *All Star Band*" and hit the top of the Swedish charts. Champlin knew both Williams and Friestedt well, as they had worked together in the past during the recordings of Friestedt's solo albums "The L.A. project" and "The L.A. project Vol. 2". They decided to join forces and subsequently released under the name "Champlin Williams Friestedt" several singles, a self-titled album in 2015, "2" in 2020. and Champlin, Williams, Friestedt "3" in 2024

== Personal life ==
Bill Champlin resides in Los Angeles, California. He has two sisters, Mimi Champlin and Sally Champlin. Champlin was married in the 1970s and had two children, Bradford Raymond Champlin and Amy Jo Kelly. Champlin has been married since 1982 to his second wife, singer-songwriter Tamara Champlin, and together they have son Will Champlin, who finished third on Season 5 (2013) of The Voice. In 1983, the same year son Will was born, Bill and Tamara performed music together on screen in the film Copper Mountain. On September 13, 2016, Champlin's son Bradford died from complications due to esophageal cancer. He was 51.

== Discography ==
=== Studio albums ===
- 1978: Single (Full Moon / Epic Records)
- 1981: Runaway (Elektra) #178 Billboard Top 200 Album chart
- 1990: No Wasted Moments (Elektra)
- 1992: Burn Down The Night (Emotion)
- 1994: Through It All (Turnip The Music Group)
- 1995: He Started To Sing (Turnip The Music Group)
- 2008: No Place Left To Fall (DreamMakers Music)
- 2015: Champlin, Williams, Friestedt (AOR Heaven)
- 2018: Bleeding Secrets Bill Champlin & WunderGround (Wunderground Records)
- 2020: Champlin, Williams, Friestedt II (Black Lodge Records)
- 2021: Livin' for Love (Imagen Records)
- 2024: CWF III (Black Lodge Records)

=== Live albums ===
- 1996: Mayday (Champlin Records)
- 2012: Santa Fe & The Fat City Horns: Live with the Champlins (Strokeland Records)
- 2012: Champlin Williams Friestedt *All Star Band* (LA Project Productions)

=== Singles ===
- 1978: "Fly With Me"
- 1978: "What Good is Love"
- 1981: "Satisfaction"
- 1982: "Tonight, Tonight" #55 Billboard Hot 100, #69 Cashbox Top 100
- 1982: "Sara" #19 Billboard AC, #61 Billboard Hot 100, #68 Cashbox Top 100
- 1982: "Take It Uptown"
- 1986: "The Last Unbroken Heart" (with Patti LaBelle) #15 Billboard AC
- 1990: "The City"
- 1991: "Memories of Her"
- 1994: "In the Heat of the Night"
- 1996: "Southern Serenade"
