= Jason Scheff =

American bassist, singer, and songwriter (born 1962)

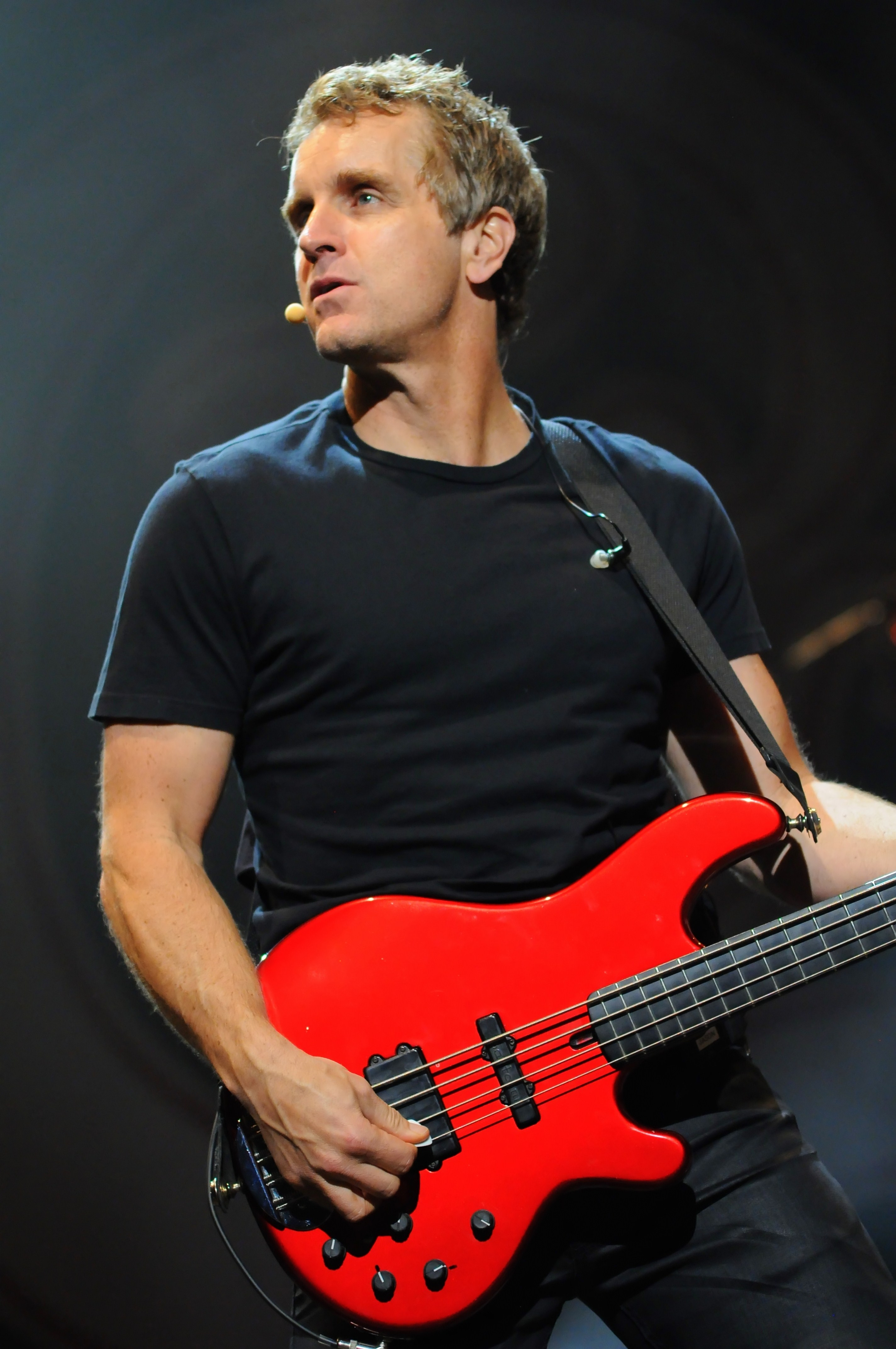
- Scheff in 2013

Background information
- Born: Jason Randolph Scheff; April 16, 1962 (age 64); San Diego, California, U.S.
- Genres: Rock; blues
- Occupation: Musician
- Instruments: Vocals; bass; keytar; guitar
- Years active: 1976–present
- Formerly of: Chicago
- Website: jasonscheff.com

Jason Randolph Scheff (born April 16, 1962) is an American bassist, singer, and songwriter who was a frontman for the American rock band Chicago from 1985 to 2016. Replacing former lead vocalist Peter Cetera, Scheff was the longest-serving bassist/vocalist of Chicago.

== Chicago ==
In mid-1985, 23-year-old Scheff joined the multiplatinum band Chicago, after Peter Cetera had departed the band to continue his solo career.

His lead vocals were debuted on the 1986 single "25 or 6 to 4", a remake of their 1970 hit, then followed up with "Will You Still Love Me?"

In addition to performing the band's classic material, Scheff had composed several original songs for the band, including their 1989 top-5 single "What Kind of Man Would I Be?" Scheff also co-wrote the song "Heart of Mine" with Bobby Caldwell and Dennis Matkosky. The song became a big hit for Boz Scaggs in 1988 and was included on the 1988 Boz Scaggs album Other Roads and the collection Hits!. Scheff performed "Heart of Mine" several years later in 2007 for a theater-in-the-round setting at the Bluebird Cafe in Nashville.

Scheff, along with co-writers Peter Wolf and Ina Wolf, wrote the song "Bigger Than Elvis" in 1993 for what was intended to be Chicago's 22nd album. This song is about his father, Jerry Scheff, describing Jason's childhood memories of watching his father play on television. The album, however, was rejected by Warner Bros. in 1993, and remained unreleased until 2008, when Rhino released it as Chicago XXXII: Stone of Sisyphus.

In 2005, Scheff and Chicago founding member Robert Lamm convinced the band to record Chicago XXX, their first collection of new material since 1991's Twenty 1. Scheff also enlisted Rascal Flatts vocalist and bassist Jay DeMarcus to serve as producer for the new album, which was released on March 21, 2006. Scheff co-wrote seven of the 12 songs on the CD.

He was part of two a cappella releases by West Coast All Stars. The first in 1997, called "California Dreamin'", included vocals by Joseph Williams, Bill Champlin, Bobby Kimball, and Scheff; the second in 1998, "Naturally", again featured Williams, Kimball, and Scheff, adding this time Tommy Funderburk as the fourth vocal.

In the 2000s, he was part of Robert Lamm's solo band for performances and three albums. In 2005, Scheff (credited as Jason Chefe) appeared on the Pink Floyd tribute album Back Against the Wall, performing lead vocals and bass on the track "Run Like Hell", together with Dweezil Zappa (lead guitar), Tony Kaye (keyboard solo), Aynsley Dunbar (drums), Bob Kulick (electric guitar), and Billy Sherwood (keyboards).

Scheff and Lamm also collaborated as the executive producers of Zosia Karbowiak's first international solo release in 2009 S.I.N.G.

A few weeks after performing with Chicago for the band's Rock and Roll Hall of Fame induction in April 2016, Scheff took a leave of absence from the band. Singer/bassist Jeff Coffey filled in for him on the summer tour. In October of that year, Scheff left Chicago permanently, with Coffey initially as his successor before the latter was replaced by Canadian tenor vocalist Neil Donell and bassist Brett Simons in late 2018. He remains the longest-serving bassist/vocalist in the band's history.

Scheff appeared in January 2017 in the CNN feature film by Peter Pardini Now More Than Ever: The History of Chicago, which began filming before his departure from the band.

== Other work ==
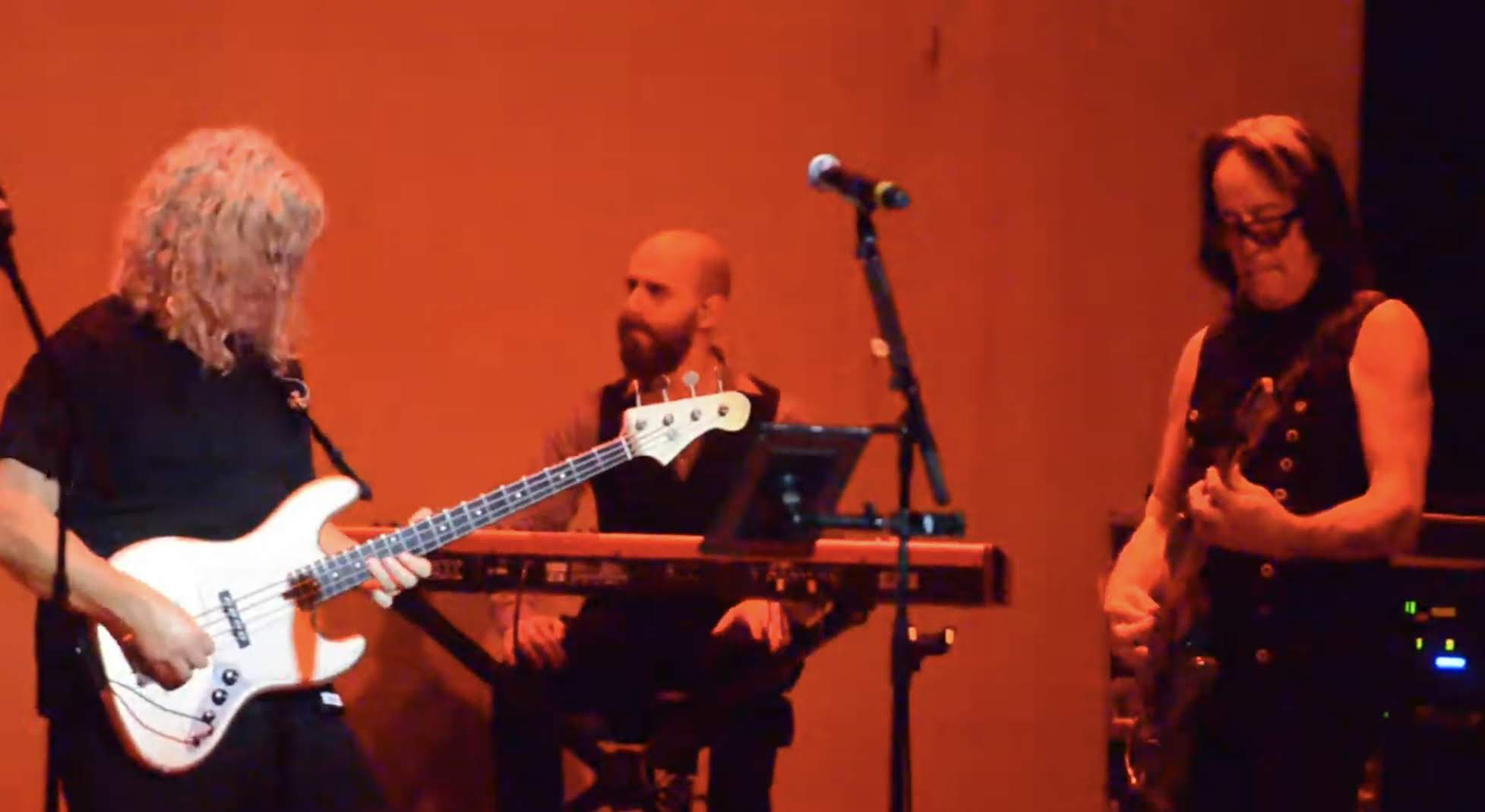
Scheff and Todd Rundgren performing in 2019

In 1996, Scheff released his first solo album Chauncy. It features recording of Scheff's 1993 co-composition "Mah-Jong", co-written with Brock Walsh and Aaron Zigman. It later released on 2008 Chicago album Chicago XXXII: Stone of Sisyphus.

After leaving Chicago in 2016, Scheff participated as a judge for American Super Group. He has worked with new artists trying to break into the music business by conducting songwriting workshops and music lessons.

Scheff has participated in a number of fundraisers for charities.

In 2019, Scheff toured with Todd Rundgren, Denny Laine, Christopher Cross, and Joey Molland in celebration of the Beatles' White Album on the It Was Fifty Years Ago Today – A Tribute to the Beatles’ White Album. Scheff performed the Chicago songs "25 or 6 to 4" and "Hard to Say I'm Sorry".
