= You're the Inspiration: A Collection =

Compilation album by Peter Cetera
- Released: May 20, 1997
- Genre: Soft rock
- Length: 45:19
- Label: River North
- Producer: Various

Peter Cetera chronology
One Clear Voice (1995)	You're the Inspiration: A Collection (1997)	Another Perfect World (2001)

Professional ratings
Review scores
Source	Rating
AllMusic	3/5 stars

You're the Inspiration: A Collection is a compilation album by Peter Cetera released in 1997. The album is a collection of previously recorded duets, a few new songs and a few re-recordings of old Chicago hits.

== Background ==
Following the release of One Clear Voice in 1995, Peter Cetera and his label began the task of creating a "greatest hits" type package to release. This proved to be challenging as many of Cetera's charting singles were from the four albums he had released under former label, Warner Brothers. Compounding the problem further, he had charting duet singles on albums by Agnetha Fältskog and Cher, which were the property of their record labels. In addition, many of his hits from his career as a member of the band Chicago were the property of either Warner Brothers or his old band mates. When River North approached Chicago and their self-run record label, Chicago Records, about licensing the master recordings, the band refused outright. In 1997 and 1998, Chicago Records used the songs on two The Heart of Chicago greatest hits packages put out in a partnership between Chicago Records and Warner Brothers.

While the label sorted out the licensing his duet hits with Warner, Geffen and WEA, Cetera stepped into the studio to record five songs for the compilation. The first two were original songs, "Do You Love Me That Much?" and "She Doesn't Need Me Anymore". The latter was a song about Cetera's daughter Claire, who turned 14 shortly after the album was released. The other three were new recordings of Cetera's Chicago hits, "If You Leave Me Now", "Baby, What a Big Surprise" and "You're the Inspiration". The song keys were lowered a whole step down to suit Cetera's loss of range. "You're the Inspiration" sounded country flavored while "Baby, What a Big Surprise" had a harder edge electric guitar than the original due to the lower keys and was missing the final verse.

In the end, the album featured all of Cetera's hit duets, along with two new songs and three re-recorded songs.

== Release ==
Unlike One Clear Voice, You're the Inspiration: A Collection made the Billboard Top 200 album charts, peaking at #134, higher than his last two studio albums and higher than his first solo album from 1981. The first single, "Do You Love Me That Much?" made the Billboard Adult Contemporary Chart, hitting #6. This was followed by "She Doesn't Need Me Anymore", which hit #27 AC.

For the third single, the label remixed the new version of "You're the Inspiration" with backing vocals from R&B vocal group Az Yet. The group had scored a hit single remaking Cetera's "Hard to Say I'm Sorry" a year earlier, featuring Cetera's vocals at the end. An ocean side video was filmed featuring Cetera and the group, as well as Cetera's newborn daughter Senna in some scenes. The single peaked at #77 on the Billboard Hot 100 and #29 on the Billboard Adult Contemporary chart.

Cetera did not go on tour in support of the album. When he finally returned to live concerts in 2002, he performed the original Chicago arrangements of the songs.

The album sold approximately 250,000 copies as of 1999 - a commercial disappointment by some standards, but was one of the top selling albums released on the small record label.

== Track listing ==
1. "If You Leave Me Now" (Peter Cetera) (original key: B) (re-recording: A) – 4:21
2. "The Next Time I Fall" (with Amy Grant) (Bobby Caldwell, Paul Gordon) – 3:40
3. "Do You Love Me That Much" (Liz Hengber, Will Robinson) – 3:38
4. "Feels Like Heaven" (with Chaka Khan) (Mark Goldenberg, Kit Hain) – 4:47
5. "You're the Inspiration" (Cetera, David Foster) (original key: G#) (re-recording: G) – 4:06
6. "I Wasn't the One (Who Said Goodbye)" (with Agnetha Fältskog) (Mark Mueller, Aaron Zigman) – 4:04
7. "She Doesn't Need Me Anymore" (Cetera, Walt Aldridge) – 4:30
8. "Baby, What a Big Surprise" (Cetera) (original key: C) (re-recording: Bb) – 3:30
9. "(I Wanna Take) Forever Tonight" (with Crystal Bernard) (Eric Carmen, Andy Goldmark) – 4:34
10. "After All" (with Cher) (Tom Snow, Dean Pitchford) – 4:04
11. "S.O.S." (with Ronna Reeves) (Benny Andersson, Björn Ulvaeus, Stig Anderson) – 4:05

=== Notes ===
- The European and German CD versions contain an additional 12th track, "You're the Inspiration (Remix)" featuring Az Yet.
- Track 3 on the Philippine and Hong Kong CD versions of the album is "You're the Inspiration" with Az Yet, and also contains "You're the Inspiration (New Version)" as track 12 which is the solo version of the song and the same as track 5 on the U.S. release listed above.
