= World Falling Down =

Studio album by Peter Cetera
- Released: July 10, 1992
- Recorded: June 1991−March 1992
- Studios: The Townhouse (London, UK); Comforts Place (Surrey, UK); Ocean Studios (Burbank, California); Ocean Way Recording and Sun Valley Audio (Hollywood, California); That Studio (North Hollywood, California); Westlake Studios and Lion Share Studios (Los Angeles, California); Ground Control (Santa Monica, California)
- Genre: Rock
- Length: 44:52
- Labels: Full Moon; Warner Bros.
- Producers: Andy Hill; Peter Cetera; David Foster

Peter Cetera chronology
| One More Story (1988) | World Falling Down (1992) | One Clear Voice (1995) |

Singles from World Falling Down
- 1. "Restless Heart" Released: June 1992; 2. "Feels Like Heaven" Released: October 1992; 3. "Even a Fool Can See" Released: 1992; 4. "Man in Me" Released: 1992 (EU)

Professional ratings
Review scores
| Source | Rating |
|---|---|
| AllMusic | 2/5 stars |

World Falling Down is the fourth solo album by American singer-songwriter Peter Cetera, released in July 1992, and his third album since leaving the group Chicago. The album is also the last album by Cetera to be released on Warner Bros. Records, and the first to be released without Full Moon Records because it went defunct on the same year.

== Background ==
Released four years after his previous album, One More Story, World Falling Down was recorded sporadically over a lengthy period across nine different recording studios. Cetera's marriage to second wife, Diane Nini had ended, causing the once busy songwriter to step away from the music scene. Between 1988 and 1992, his only musical activities were an appearance as a guest vocalist on Cher's 1989 single, "After All", a song on the soundtrack to the movie Chances Are, "No Explanation" for the soundtrack to the movie Pretty Woman, and a vocal contribution to David Foster's "Voices That Care" production, based on music that he and Cetera had written together years earlier. Deeply depressed, Cetera found himself using the album as an outlet to deal with his marriage ending and learning to be a single parent. Recording began in London, England and occurred in short, spread out bursts as Cetera worked through the personal issues in his life.

In 1992, he explained to Billboard, "This was actually the first time I could write about the other side of love. I'd try to write a happy love song and I just couldn't do it. Then I got mad and so everything was about hating the world. I finally settled on the truth."

The album was predominantly produced by Andy Hill and Cetera. Two tracks were produced by veteran producer David Foster who had worked with Cetera previously on Chicago 16 and Chicago 17 during his days as bassist and vocalist for Chicago. Former Chicago alumni Bill Champlin sings background vocals on the song "Wild Ways", and singer Chaka Khan stepped in to perform a duet on the song "Feels Like Heaven" after original partner Lorrie Morgan was unable to perform the song in its intended key. Unlike Cetera's previous three solo efforts, Cetera co-wrote only four songs on World Falling Down. The album also marked a brief return to bass playing as Cetera himself played the bass lines on "Dip Your Wings" and "Where There's No Tomorrow".

== Commercial reception ==
Released on July 10, 1992, World Falling Down was a commercial disappointment. Dance, rap and alternative rock songs had begun dominating top forty radio, resulting in a decline in pop music that had been popular only a few years earlier. Many of Cetera's contemporaries, including his former band-mates in Chicago, found their singles struggling to get airplay and generate album sales.

Warner Bros. released three singles, "Restless Heart", "Feels Like Heaven" and "Even a Fool Can See". Only "Restless Heart" made the top 40, peaking at No. 35 on the Billboard Hot 100, though it topped the Billboard Adult Contemporary chart at No. 1 for two weeks. "Feels Like Heaven" hit No. 71 on the Billboard Hot 100 and No. 5 on the Billboard AC chart. The third single, "Even a Fool Can See" performed slightly better, reaching No. 68 on the Billboard Top 100 and No. 3 on the Billboard AC Chart the next summer.

As with his previous solo efforts, Cetera declined to go on tour feeling that he didn't have enough solo material. The singer performed live on The Tonight Show and The Arsenio Hall Show to promote the album. In addition, Warner produced music videos for the first two singles, with Cetera's daughter Claire appearing in the music video for "Restless Heart". The final track, "Have You Ever Been In Love?" was not released as a single, but gained popularity when used by professional skaters in their routines. Cetera often closes live concerts with the popular album cut.

World Falling Down reached a peak of No. 163 on the Billboard Pop Albums chart during a brief stay. Following its commercial disappointment, Cetera left Warner Brothers and signed to the independent record label, River North Records.

In 2010, a Heineken light beer commercial, "Lady Music", featured the album cover and the song "Restless Heart".

== Track listing ==
1. "Restless Heart" (Peter Cetera, Andy Hill) – 4:09
2. "Even a Fool Can See" (Cetera, Mark Goldenberg) – 4:31
3. "Feels Like Heaven" (Goldenberg, Kit Hain) – 4:48
  - Performed by Peter Cetera and Chaka Khan
4. "Wild Ways" (David Tyson, Christopher Ward) – 4:00
5. "World Falling Down" (Cetera, Hill) – 5:00
6. "Man in Me" (Joseph Williams, Paul Gordon) – 5:41
7. "Where There's No Tomorrow" (Cetera, Hill, Jimmy Cregan) – 4:43
8. "The Last Place God Made" (Richard Kerr, Gary Osborne) – 4:14
9. "Dip Your Wings" (Bernie Taupin, Paul Fox, Franne Golde) – 3:33
10. "Have You Ever Been in Love" (Hill, Peter Sinfield, John Danter) – 4:06

== Production ==
- Peter Cetera – producer
- Andy Hill – producer (1, 3–7, 9, 10)
- David Foster – producer (2, 8)
- Martin Hayes – engineer
- Rick Holbrook – engineer
- Richard Manwaring – engineer
- Trevor Vallis – engineer
- Tom Lord-Alge – mixing at Encore Studios (Burbank, California)
- David Betancourt – mix assistant
- Ted Jensen – mastering at Sterling Sound (New York City, New York)
- Marsha Burns – production coordinator
- Suzanne Edgrin – production coordinator
- Carrie McConkey – production coordinator
- Merlyn Rosenberg – photography
- Janet Levinson – art direction, design
- Jeff Wald – management
- Kelly Newby – management

== Personnel ==
- Peter Cetera – lead vocals, backing vocals (2, 4, 5), bass (7, 9)
- Andy Hill – all instruments (1), keyboards (3, 7), programming (3–5, 7), acoustic guitar (3, 5), guitars (4, 7), bass (4, 5), keyboard programming (6), drum programming (6), backing vocals (7)
- Mark Goldenberg – keyboards (2), programming (2), guitars (2)
- Robbie Buchanan – acoustic piano solo (2), additional keyboards (6)
- Simon Franglen – Synclavier programming (2, 8)
- C.J. Vanston – additional keyboards (3), keyboards (6, 8–10), programming (8, 10), acoustic piano (10)
- Peter-John Vettese – acoustic piano (3, 6, 7), keyboards (4, 6)
- David Foster – keyboards (8)
- Claude Gaudette – additional programming (8)
- Bruce Gaitsch – programming (9), acoustic guitar (9)
- Tim Pierce – guitars (3, 6, 7, 9, 10), guitar solo (4, 7)
- Keith Airey – guitars (4), additional guitars (7)
- Michael Thompson – guitars (8)
- Jimmy Johnson – bass (2)
- Pino Palladino – bass (3, 6)
- Graham Broad – drums (3–7)
- John Robinson – percussion (2), drums (8, 9)
- Tal Bergman – percussion (3, 6)
- Chris Mostert – saxophone (3)
- Bill Reichenbach Jr. – trombone (2, 6)
- Gary Grant – trumpet (2, 6)
- Jerry Hey – trumpet (2, 6), horn arrangements (2, 6)
- Janey Clewer – backing vocals (1, 4, 7–9)
- Edie Lehmann – backing vocals (1, 7–9)
- Bobbi Page – backing vocals (1, 7–9)
- Chaka Khan – lead vocals (3)
- Kenny Cetera – backing vocals (4)
- Bill Champlin – backing vocals (4)
- Tamara Champlin – backing vocals (4)
- Joseph Williams – backing vocals (6)
