= List of Hot Adult Contemporary number ones of 1988 =

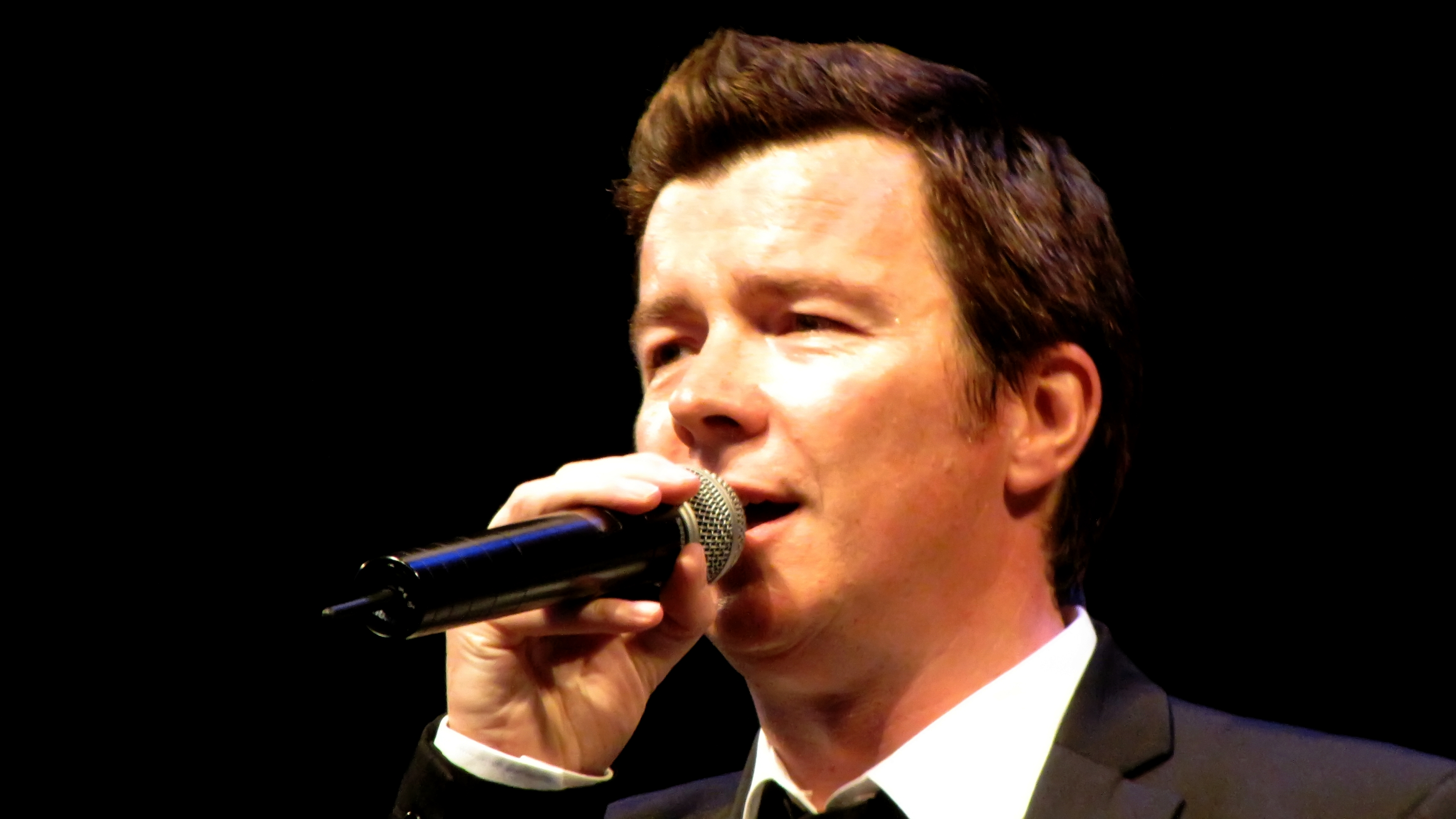
The British vocalist Rick Astley (pictured in 2009) had two number ones in 1988.

In 1988, Billboard magazine published a chart ranking the top-performing songs in the United States in the adult contemporary music (AC) market. The chart, which in 1988 was published under the title Hot Adult Contemporary, has undergone various name changes during its history but has been published as Adult Contemporary since 1996. In 1988, 22 songs topped the chart based on playlists submitted by radio stations.

In the year's first issue of Billboard, the number one song was "Got My Mind Set on You" by George Harrison, which was in its third week at number one. It held the top spot for two weeks in 1988 before being displaced by "Everywhere" by the British-American rock group Fleetwood Mac. In March, the actor Patrick Swayze reached number one with the song "She's Like the Wind", featuring Wendy Fraser, taken from the soundtrack of the film Dirty Dancing, in which he starred. It was the second AC chart-topper from the film, following "(I've Had) The Time of My Life" by Bill Medley and Jennifer Warnes, which had reached number one the previous year. The British singer Phil Collins topped the chart with two songs from the soundtrack of the film Buster, in which he played the lead role, reaching the top spot with his rendition of the 1965 song "A Groovy Kind of Love" and the original track "Two Hearts".

Gloria Estefan and her band Miami Sound Machine were the only act to have three number ones during the year, but they were the final three AC chart entries on which Miami Sound Machine received separate billing; all Estefan's subsequent charting songs were credited to her alone. The Latin-influenced group spent a total of five weeks at number one, tying with Whitney Houston and Phil Collins for the most time spent atop the chart by an act during 1988. Collins and Houston each achieved their total with two number ones; the British vocalists Rick Astley and George Michael were the only other acts with multiple chart toppers during the year. The year's longest unbroken run at number one was achieved by Peter Cetera, whose song "One Good Woman" spent four weeks in the top spot in September. Chicago, the group which Cetera had fronted for nearly two decades before leaving in 1985, achieved its first AC number one since his departure when "Look Away" spent a single week in the top spot in December. The final Hot Adult Contemporary number one of 1988 was "Two Hearts" by Phil Collins, which held the top spot for the last two weeks of the year.

== Chart history ==
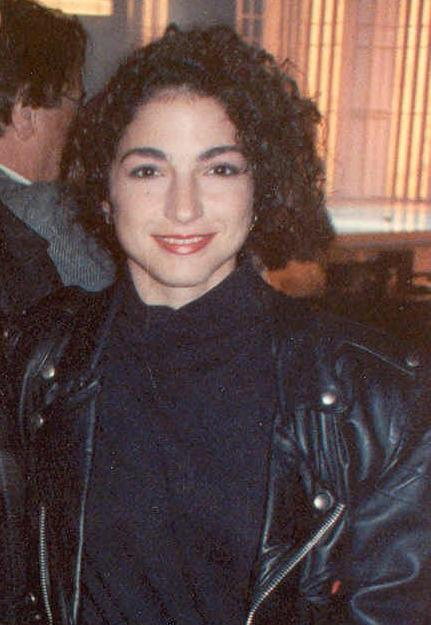
Gloria Estefan and Miami Sound Machine had three number ones in 1988, the most by any act.

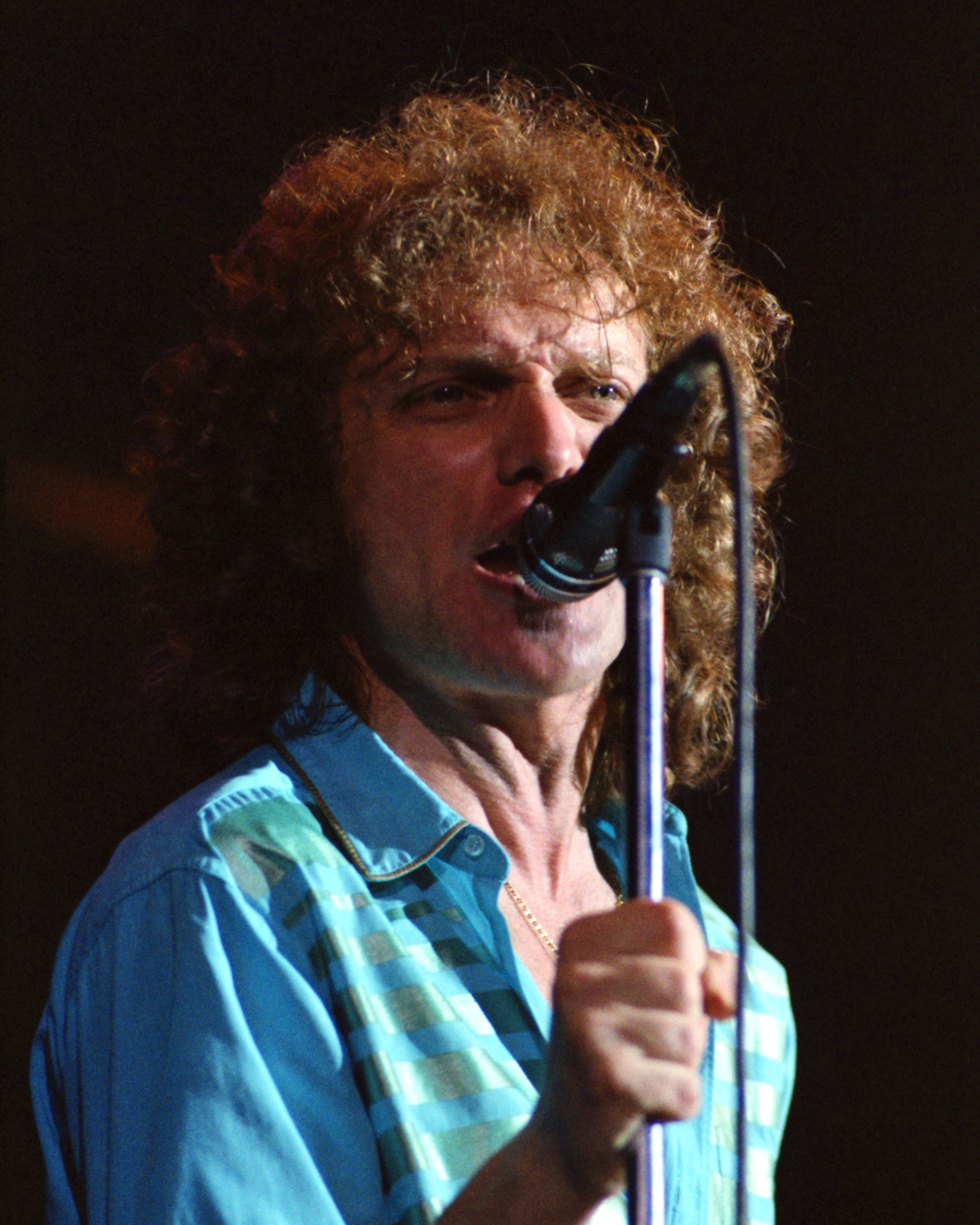
The British-American rock band Foreigner (vocalist Lou Gramm pictured) spent one week at number one with the song "I Don't Want to Live Without You".

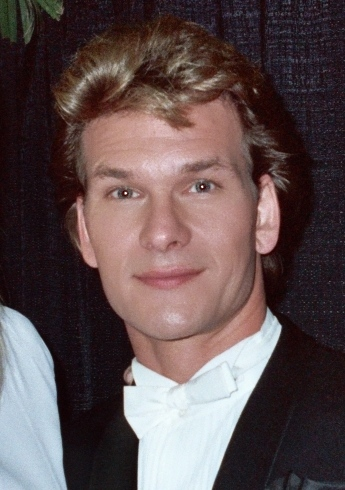
The actor Patrick Swayze topped the chart with "She's Like the Wind", from the soundtrack of his film Dirty Dancing.

Chart history
Issue date	Title	Artist(s)	Ref.
January 2	"Got My Mind Set on You"	George Harrison	
January 9	"Got My Mind Set on You"	George Harrison	
January 16	"Everywhere"	Fleetwood Mac	
January 23	"Everywhere"	Fleetwood Mac	
January 30	"Everywhere"	Fleetwood Mac	
February 6	"Could've Been"	Tiffany	
February 13	"Can't Stay Away from You"	Gloria Estefan and Miami Sound Machine	
February 20	"Seasons Change"	Exposé	
February 27	"She's Like the Wind"	Patrick Swayze featuring Wendy Fraser	
March 5	"She's Like the Wind"	Patrick Swayze featuring Wendy Fraser	
March 12	"Never Gonna Give You Up"	Rick Astley	
March 19	"Never Gonna Give You Up"	Rick Astley	
March 26	"Never Gonna Give You Up"	Rick Astley	
April 2	"Where Do Broken Hearts Go"	Whitney Houston	
April 9	"Where Do Broken Hearts Go"	Whitney Houston	
April 16	"Where Do Broken Hearts Go"	Whitney Houston	
April 23	"Anything for You"	Gloria Estefan and Miami Sound Machine	
April 30	"Anything for You"	Gloria Estefan and Miami Sound Machine	
May 7	"Anything for You"	Gloria Estefan and Miami Sound Machine	
May 14	"I Don't Want to Live Without You"	Foreigner	
May 21	"Shattered Dreams"	Johnny Hates Jazz	
May 28	"One More Try"	George Michael	
June 4	"One More Try"	George Michael	
June 11	"One More Try"	George Michael	
June 18	"The Valley Road"	Bruce Hornsby and the Range	
June 25	"Make It Real"	The Jets	
July 2	"Make It Real"	The Jets	
July 9	"Make It Real"	The Jets	
July 16	"Make Me Lose Control"	Eric Carmen	
July 23	"Make Me Lose Control"	Eric Carmen	
July 30	"Make Me Lose Control"	Eric Carmen	
August 6	"Roll with It"	Steve Winwood	
August 13	"Roll with It"	Steve Winwood	
August 20	"I Don't Wanna Go On with You Like That"	Elton John	
August 27	"1-2-3"	Gloria Estefan and Miami Sound Machine	
September 3	"One Good Woman"	Peter Cetera	
September 10	"One Good Woman"	Peter Cetera	
September 17	"One Good Woman"	Peter Cetera	
September 24	"One Good Woman"	Peter Cetera	
October 1	"It Would Take a Strong Strong Man"	Rick Astley	
October 8	"A Groovy Kind of Love"	Phil Collins	
October 15	"A Groovy Kind of Love"	Phil Collins	
October 22	"A Groovy Kind of Love"	Phil Collins	
October 29	"One Moment in Time"	Whitney Houston	
November 5	"One Moment in Time"	Whitney Houston	
November 12	"How Can I Fall?"	Breathe	
November 19	"How Can I Fall?"	Breathe	
November 26	"Kissing a Fool"	George Michael	
December 3	"Look Away"	Chicago	
December 10	"Giving You the Best That I Got"	Anita Baker	
December 17	"Waiting for a Star to Fall"	Boy Meets Girl	
December 24	"Two Hearts"	Phil Collins	
December 31	"Two Hearts"	Phil Collins	
