= One Clear Voice =

Studio album by Peter Cetera
- Released: July 25, 1995
- Recorded: 1994–1995
- Studios: River North Studios (Chicago, Illinois); O'Henry Sound Studios (North Hollywood, California); Chapel Studios (Encino, California); Global Sanity and Saturn Sound (Studio City, California); Ocean Studios and Encore Studios (Burbank, California); Sound Emporium and Sound Stage Studios (Nashville, Tennessee); Comforts Place (Surrey, UK)
- Genre: Rock
- Length: 43:48
- Label: River North
- Producers: Peter Cetera; Andy Hill

Peter Cetera chronology
World Falling Down (1992)	One Clear Voice (1995)	You're the Inspiration: A Collection (1997)

Professional ratings
Review scores
Source	Rating
Allmusic	link

One Clear Voice is the fifth solo album for music artist Peter Cetera and his fourth album since leaving the group Chicago. The album was recorded and released in 1995 by River North Records.

== Background ==
Following his departure from Warner Brothers in 1993, Cetera met Steve Devick while on vacation in Maui with his daughter. Devick had created the Chicago-based label in 1985 and was looking to expand from its Gospel roots into popular music. Cetera, who was looking for a new label at the time, signed a multi-album deal in October 1993.

Teaming up again with Andy Hill, who had produced his previous album, World Falling Down, Cetera took a more active role songwriting, this time, writing six new songs for the album. At Devick's request, Cetera re-recorded his old Chicago song, "Happy Man". The song "(I Wanna Take) Forever Tonight" had been given to Cetera by its composer Eric Carmen who had himself recorded it some five years previously for an abandoned album: (Eric Carmen quote:)"Peter...toned down the lyric, made it a little less sexual. I understand why he did it, but I wasn't too [happy] about it." Cetera cut Carmen's song as a duet with Crystal Bernard who - besides being a sitcom actress (Wings) - was also a part-time songwriter who had sent Cetera a demo of her compositions: Cetera declined to record any of Bernard's songs but on the basis of her vocals on the demo invited her to partner him on "(I Wanna Take) Forever Tonight". Country singer and label mate, Ronna Reeves was recruited for a remake of the ABBA classic, "SOS". Hill and Cetera produced six of the album's eleven songs together, while Cetera produced the remaining five on his own.

One Clear Voice was released July 25, 1995, distributed by Mercury Records.

== Commercial reception ==
One Clear Voice failed to enter the charts, a fact that some attributed to the small relative size of River North Records. Three singles were released to modest success on the Billboard Adult Contemporary chart (AC): "(I Wanna Take) Forever Tonight" (No. 22 AC, No. 86 Billboard Hot 100), "Faithfully" (No. 13 AC), and "One Clear Voice" (No. 12 AC) with "SOS" serving as a fourth single which failed to chart.

On the Canadian RPM charts, the singles "(I Wanna Take) Forever Tonight" and "Faithfully" performed better, both entering the top 40 of the top tracks charts and peaking at #38 in 1995 and #23 in 1996 respectively. Both also fared well on the Canadian adult contemporary chart, reaching the top 10 at #6 in 1995 and #7 in 1996 respectively. Meanwhile, "One Clear Voice" did not enter the top tracks chart and was a modest adult contemporary chart hit, peaking only at #40 in August 1996.

In promoting the album, Cetera did several live chats on internet forums as well as television interviews and performances.

Unlike his previous albums, Cetera also planned a live tour for One Clear Voice. With five albums of solo material recorded, Cetera felt that he had a broad mix of material to draw from so that he wouldn't be limited to his old songs with Chicago. The tour was delayed when Cetera was in a motorcycle accident over a long weekend in July 1995. A short tour played several dates in the fall of 1995, with a second leg in the summer of 1996 including a few more American and international dates. The One Clear Voice tour marked Cetera's first live concerts since the conclusion of the Chicago 17 tour more than 10 years earlier. It would also be his last live concerts for another seven years. The tour included material from his solo albums as well as several Chicago hits including "25 or 6 to 4", "If You Leave Me Now", "Hard To Say I'm Sorry", "You're The Inspiration" and "Feeling Stronger Every Day". Towards the end of the concerts, Cetera himself would play the bass on three songs.

Despite a commercial reception that was chilly by mainstream standards, One Clear Voice was one of Platinum Entertainment's top selling albums, selling approximately 250,000 copies.

In 2005, the Compendia label re-issued the whole package under a new design, title and sequencing, retitled Faithfully.

== Track listing ==
1. "The End of Camelot" (Peter Cetera, Andy Hill) – 4:19
2. "Faithfully" (Chuck Jones, Pam Rose) – 3:21
3. "(I Wanna Take) Forever Tonight" (with Crystal Bernard) (Eric Carmen, Andy Goldmark) – 4:36
4. "Apple of Your Daddy's Eye" (Cetera, Jack Conrad) – 4:05
5. "One Clear Voice" (Marc Beeson, Gerald Martin) – 3:47
6. "Wanna Be There" (Cetera, Hill) – 3:28
7. "The Lucky Ones" (Cetera, Bruce Gaitsch, James Newton Howard) – 3:27
8. "Still Getting Over You" (Cetera, Hill) – 4:15
9. "S.O.S." (with Ronna Reeves) (Benny Andersson, Björn Ulvaeus, Stig Anderson) – 4:13
10. "And I Think of You" (Cetera, Hill) – 3:36
11. "Happy Man" (Cetera) (Chicago cover) – 4:36

=== 2005 Faithfully re-release ===
1. "Faithfully" (Chuck Jones, Pam Rose) – 3:21
2. "(I Wanna Take) Forever Tonight" (with Crystal Bernard) (Eric Carmen, Andy Goldmark) – 4:36
3. "One Clear Voice" (Marc Beeson, Gerald Martin) – 3:47
4. "S.O.S." (with Ronna Reeves) (Benny Andersson, Björn Ulvaeus, Stig Anderson) – 4:13
5. "The End of Camelot" (Peter Cetera, Andy Hill) – 4:19
6. "Apple of Your Daddy's Eye" (Cetera, Jack Conrad) – 4:05
7. "Wanna Be There" (Cetera, Hill) – 3:28
8. "Happy Man" (Cetera) (Chicago cover) – 4:36
9. "The Lucky Ones" (Cetera, Bruce Gaitsch, James Newton Howard) – 3:27
10. "And I Think of You" (Cetera, Hill) – 3:36
11. "Still Getting Over You" (Cetera, Hill) – 4:15

== Personnel ==
- Peter Cetera – lead vocals, backing vocals (1, 4–7)
- Andy Hill – electric piano (1), acoustic guitars (1, 8, 9), bass (1, 6, 9, 10), keyboards (6, 8, 9), additional guitars (6, 10)
- Pat Coil – organ (2, 6, 8), synthesizers (8, 9)
- Claude Gaudette – synthesizers (2, 3, 5, 7)
- John Hobbs – acoustic piano (2, 8)
- Randy Waldman – keyboards (3)
- C.J. Vanston – keyboards (4, 5), synthesizers (4), bass (4)
- Rick Holbrook – additional keyboards (4), additional programming (5), organ (7), additional synthesizers (9)
- James Newton Howard – keyboards (7)
- Tim Truman – keyboards (11), keyboard arrangements (11), string arrangements and conductor (11)
- Dann Huff – electric guitars (1, 5, 11), guitars (2–4, 6–9)
- Brent Rowan – 12-string guitar (1, 10), guitars (10)
- Bruce Gaitsch – acoustic rhythm guitar (3), acoustic guitars (7)
- Marc Beeson – acoustic guitars (5), acoustic guitar solo (5), backing vocals (5)
- Kevin Cronin – additional acoustic guitars (5), acoustic guitars (11)
- Paul Franklin – pedal steel guitar (3, 5, 8)
- Willie Weeks – bass (2)
- Gary Lunn – bass (3, 5)
- Michael Rhodes – bass (7, 11)
- Pino Palladino – bass (8)
- Graham Broad – drums (1, 6, 8–10)
- Eddie Bayers – drums (2)
- Paul Leim – drums (3, 5, 11)
- Todd Sucherman – drums (4, 7)
- Paulinho da Costa – percussion (2, 4, 7, 9)
- Dana Glover – saxophone (3)
- Dan Higgins – saxophone (4)
- Ronn Huff – string arrangements and conductor (2, 3, 5, 9)
- The Chicago Symphony Orchestra – strings (2, 3, 5, 9, 11)
- Robert Bowker – backing vocals (1, 7)
- Johnny Rutledge – backing vocals (1, 6–8)
- Rob Trow – backing vocals (1)
- Chuck Jones – backing vocals (2)
- Pam Rose – backing vocals (2)
- Crystal Bernard – lead vocals (3), backing vocals (4)
- Yvonne Gage – backing vocals (4, 6)
- Cheryl Wilson – backing vocals (4, 6)
- Steve Grissette – backing vocals (6)
- Robin Robinson – backing vocals (6)
- Steve Robinson – backing vocals (6, 8)
- Josie Warner – backing vocals (6)
- Keithen Carter – backing vocals (7)
- Claire Cetera – backing vocals (7)
- Jeff Morrow – backing vocals (7, 8)
- Tom Griffin – backing vocals (8)
- Tony Ransom – backing vocals (8)
- Ronna Reeves – lead vocals (9)

== Production ==
- Peter Cetera – producer
- Andy Hill – producer (1, 2, 6, 8–10)
- Rick Holbrook – production assistant
- Diane Zandstra – production coordinator
- Valerie Behling – art direction, design
- Connie Treantafeles – art direction, design
- Steve Wolter – photography

Technical credits

- Ted Jensen – mastering at Sterling Sound (New York City, New York)
- Rick Holbrook – recording, mixing
- Scott Ahaus – additional engineer
- Darren Ford – additional engineer
- Rick Fritz – additional recording
- Nick Griffiths – additional recording
- Susan Becker – assistant engineer
- David Foster – assistant engineer
- Richard Landers – assistant engineer
- Tim Lauber – assistant engineer
- Charles Nasser – assistant engineer
- Mark Ralston – assistant engineer
- Jeffrey Shannon – assistant engineer
- Nick Sparks – assistant engineer
- Carlos Warlick – assistant engineer
- Andrew Warwick – assistant engineer
