= Restless Heart (Peter Cetera song) =

1992 single by Peter Cetera

Single by Peter Cetera

from the album World Falling Down
- B-side: "Dip Your Wings"; "One Good Woman"
- Released: 1992
- Length: 4:09
- Label: Full Moon; Warner Bros.
- Songwriters: Peter Cetera; Andy Hill
- Producers: Andy Hill; Peter Cetera

Peter Cetera singles chronology
"After All" (1989)	"Restless Heart" (1992)	"Feels Like Heaven" (1992)

Audio
- "Restless Heart" on YouTube

"Restless Heart" is a song by American singer Peter Cetera, written by Cetera and Andy Hill and released from the album World Falling Down in 1992. "Restless Heart" was Cetera's final of five number-one hits on the US Adult Contemporary chart, spending two weeks at the top. It was also his final top-40 hit on the Billboard Hot 100 chart, peaking at number 35. The music video for the song was added to VH1 rotation in early August, 1992.

== Critical reception ==
Upon its release as a single, Billboard said the song is "... an engaging and rhythmic tune that is easily the toughest-sounding track we’ve heard from [Cetera] in years. Song has a sing-along chorus that will sound quite nice on soft top 40 and AC stations." Cetera received ASCAP honors for "Restless Heart" as a "most-performed song" in the society's 1994 pop awards.

== Track listing ==
Maxi-CD

1. "Restless Heart" – 4:09
2. "Dip Your Wings" – 3:32
3. "One Good Woman" – 4:34

== Charts ==
=== Weekly charts ===
Chart (1992)	Peak position
Australia (ARIA)	89
Canada Top Singles (RPM)	6
Canada Adult Contemporary (RPM)	1
Germany (GfK)	53
US Billboard Hot 100	35
US Adult Contemporary (Billboard)	1
US Pop Airplay (Billboard)	36

=== Year-end charts ===
Chart (1992)	Position
Canada Top Singles (RPM)	58
Canada Adult Contemporary (RPM)	4
US Adult Contemporary (Billboard)	6

== Release history ==
Region	Date	Format(s)	Label(s)	Ref.
United States	1992	Cassette	Warner Bros.	
Japan	June 25, 1992	Mini-CD	Warner Bros.	
Australia	July 13, 1992	CD	Warner Bros.	
Australia	July 27, 1992	Cassette	Warner Bros.	

== In popular culture ==
In 2010, Cetera and "Restless Heart" were featured in a television commercial for Heineken Premium Light beer in which an older man instructs a younger man that "if you love the ladies, by default you love Cetera."

"Restless Heart" was part of the soundtrack of the 2022 Hulu horror movie, Fresh. Movie critics were struck by its ironic use during a particularly dark scene.

== See also ==
- List of Hot Adult Contemporary number ones of 1992
