= From the Mind of Lil Louis =

Album by Lil Louis released in 1989

Studio album by Lil Louis
- Released: December 1989
- Studio: Chicago Recording Company; Chicago Trax Recording; River North Recorders; Universal Recording Studios (Chicago, Illinois); Royal Recorders (Lake Geneva, Wisconsin) Lake Recording Studio (Maywood, Illinois)
- Genre: Chicago house
- Label: Epic; FFRR
- Producer: Lil Louis (also exec. producer); Larry Heard; Ferranté-Eric; Die Warzau

Lil Louis chronology
From the Mind of Lil Louis (1989)	Journey with the Lonely (1992)

From the Mind of Lil Louis is the debut album by the American house musician Lil Louis. It was released in December 1989 through Epic Records and FFRR Records.

The single "French Kiss" peaked at No. 50 on the Billboard Hot 100; it peaked at No. 2 on the UK Singles Chart.

== Production ==
The album's tracks were written and produced by Lil Louis; he also played most of the instruments. The album sides are titled "Dance" and "Romance", with the song "Insecure" composed as a ballad. Lil Louis's father, who had played as a sideman with Bobby Bland and B. B. King, sings and plays guitar on "Lil Tanya". Larry Heard a.k.a. Mr. Fingers contributed production work to the album.

== Critical reception ==
Professional ratings
Review scores
Source	Rating
AllMusic	4.5/5 stars
Calgary Herald	B+
The Encyclopedia of Popular Music	4/5 stars
Ottawa Citizen	3/5 stars
The Rolling Stone Album Guide	3/5 stars

The New York Times thought that Lil Louis "has created a breakthrough album for house music by turning a genre usually heard amid the public revelry of the dance floor into a private, interior playground." The Globe and Mail wrote that the album is "a wonderfully eclectic blend of street vocals, soulful riffs and top-rate instrumental work." The St. Petersburg Times deemed the album "a bold debut," writing that "the sound is of spare, brooding jazz, uniquely subdued and shot through with Louis' smoldering sexuality ... The music's sensual appeal is awesome, as physically in tune with the times as Prince ever was." The Calgary Herald declared that "when a new artist cops tricks from Prince, George Clinton and Laurie Anderson, you know he's on the right track."

AllMusic called the album "a triumph," writing that "Larry Heard's input on tracks like 'Blackout', 'Tuch Me' and '6 A.M.' is stellar." Listing From the Mind of Lil Louis as an "Essential" album of house music, Spin praised the "propulsive" and "pastoral" conceptual sides. Mixmag included "French Kiss" on its list of "30 of the Best Chicago House Tracks," and wrote that "I Called U" and "Nyce & Slo" were also "unmissable."

== Track listing ==
=== LP version ===
Side one: "Dance"

No.	Title	Writer(s)	Length
1.	"I Called U"	Lil Louis	6:22
2.	"Blackout"	Lil Louis	6:05
3.	"Tuch Me"	Lil Louis; Larry Heard	5:07
4.	"French Kiss"	Lil Louis; Karlana Johnson	6:02
5.	"Wargames"	Lil Louis	3:04

Side two: "Romance"

No.	Title	Writer(s)	Length
1.	"6 A.M."	Heard	3:47
2.	"Nyce & Slo"	Lil Louis; Riley Evans	5:32
3.	"Insecure"	Lil Louis	6:23
4.	"The Luv U Wanted"	Ferranté-Eric	4:36
5.	"Brittany" (featuring Joi Cardwell)	Phyllis Coleman	2:32
6.	"Lil Tanya"	Bobby Sims	2:35

=== CD & cassette version ===
No.	Title	Writer(s)	Length
1.	"I Called U"	Lil Louis	6:23
2.	"Blackout"	Lil Louis	6:06
3.	"Tuch Me"	Lil Louis; Heard	5:09
4.	"French Kiss"	Lil Louis; Johnson	6:03
5.	"Wargames"	Lil Louis	3:05
6.	"It's the Only Thing"	Lil Louis; Die Warzau	5:18
7.	"6 A.M."	Heard	3:47
8.	"Nyce & Slo"	Lil Louis; Evans	5:33
9.	"Insecure"	Lil Louis	6:24
10.	"The Luv U Wanted"	Ferranté-Eric	4:37
11.	"Brittany" (featuring Joi Cardwell)	Coleman	2:33
12.	"Lil Tanya"	Sims	2:35
13.	"6 A.M." (Reprise)	Heard	3:39
14.	"I Called U" (Reprise)	Lil Louis	2:58

== Personnel ==
Adapted from the album's liner notes.

- Lil Louis – production, executive producer, arranger, mixing (all tracks), keyboard programming, drum programming, percussion, lead vocals on "Tuch Me" & "Insecure"
- Larry Heard – co-production on "Tuch Me", "6 A.M.", background vocals & additional keyboard programming
- Die Warzau – co-production on "It's the Only Thing"
- DeWayne A. Powell – executive producer
- Shawn Christopher – lead vocals on "French Kiss"
- Ferranté-Eric – co-production & performer on "The Luv U Wanted"
- Antigua/Jade – vocals on "The Luv U Wanted"
- Joi Cardwell – piano on "Brittany", acoustic piano, violin
- Bobby Sims – lead guitar
- Peter Black – piano & keyboard solos
- Alfonzo Hunter – alto saxophone & additional horns
- Cei Bei – background vocals
- Anthony Wonsle – keyboard solo on "Insecure"
- Tyson Bell – bass guitar
- Luiz Ewerling – acoustic drums
- Jennifer Wilcox – various conversation pieces
- Recording and mix engineering by Die Warzau at Chicago Recording Company, Chicago Trax Recording, River North Recorders & Universal Recording Studios (Chicago, Illinois); Royal Recorders (Lake Geneva, Wisconsin), except "Tuch Me", "6 A.M.", "Nyce & Slo" & "Insecure": recording co-engineered by Jerry "J.J." Jordan at River North Recorders; "French Kiss": recording & mix engineered by Julian Herzfeld at Chicago Trax Recording & Bob Kaider at Lake Recording Studio (Maywood, Illinois)
- Christopher Austopchuk – art direction
- Mark Burdett – design & front cover typography
