= You Just Gotta Love Christmas =

Studio album by Peter Cetera
- Released: October 19, 2004
- Recorded: Spring – Summer 2004
- Studios: The Hum Depot (Nashville, Tennessee)
- Genres: Rock, Christmas
- Length: 39:45
- Label: Viastar
- Producers: Peter Cetera, Tony Harrell

Peter Cetera chronology
Another Perfect World (2001)	You Just Gotta Love Christmas (2004)

Professional ratings
Review scores
Source	Rating
AllMusic	3/5 stars

You Just Gotta Love Christmas is the seventh and final studio album by former Chicago member Peter Cetera, and his only Christmas album. This album featured some artwork by Cetera's youngest daughter Senna, and his oldest daughter Claire performs with him on "Blue Christmas" and "Winter Wonderland". Alison Krauss performs with Cetera on "Deck the Halls". In a 2017 article, writer David White listed the album among his list of sixteen "essential classic rock Christmas albums."

== Track listing ==
1. "Let It Snow" (Sammy Cahn, Jule Styne) – 2:59
2. "Christmas Song" (Mel Tormé, Robert Wells) – 3:36
3. "Santa Claus Is Coming to Town" (J. Fred Coots, Haven Gillespie) – 3:10
4. "Blue Christmas" (with Claire Cetera) (Billy Hayes, Jay Johnson) – 3:19
5. "Deck The Halls" (with Alison Krauss) (traditional - Peter Cetera, Tony Harrell) – 3:10
6. "I'll Be Home for Christmas" (Buck Ram, Walter Kent, Kim Gannon) – 2:40
7. "You Just Gotta Love Christmas" (Cetera, Harrell) – 3:17
8. "Jingle Bells" (James Lord Pierpont - Cetera, Harrell) – 3:36
9. "God Rest Ye Merry Gentlemen" (traditional - Cetera, Harrell) – 3:01
10. "Winter Wonderland" (with Claire Cetera) (Felix Bernard, Richard B. Smith) – 2:57
11. "Something that Santa Claus Left Behind" (Cetera, Harrell) – 3:56
12. "Alone for the Holidays" (Cetera, Harrell) – 3:58

== Personnel ==
- Peter Cetera – vocals, backing vocals, bass
- Tony Harrell – keyboards, programming
- Tom Bukovac – guitars
- Bruce Gaitsch – guitars
- Kenny Greenberg – guitars
- B. James Lowry – guitars
- Jerry McPherson – guitars
- Mike Brignardello – bass
- Craig Nelson – bass
- Jimmie Lee Sloas – bass
- Glenn Worf – bass
- Greg Morrow – drums, additional programming
- Eric Darken – percussion
- Jack Gavin – congas
- Kirk "JellyRoll" Johnson – harmonica
- Jim Horn – saxophones, sax solos
- Chris Dunn – trombone
- Ben Strano – trombone, trumpet solos
- Steve Herrman – trumpet
- John Mock – pipes, buron, penny whistle
- Chris Carmichael – strings
- Claire Cetera – backing vocals on "Blue Christmas" and "Winter Wonderland"
- Alison Krauss – backing vocals on "Deck The Halls"

== Production ==
- Peter Cetera – producer, arrangements
- Tony Harrell – producer, arrangements
- Ben Strano – recording engineer
- Chuck Bracco – additional engineer
- Scott Velasco – additional engineer
- Joe Hardy – mixing
- Mark Chevalier – mastering
- Jim DeMain – mastering
- Yes Master (Nashville, Tennessee) – mastering location
- Vickey Hanson – package art, design
- Senna Cetera – inside artwork
