= Hold Me 'Til the Mornin' Comes =

"Hold Me 'Til the Morning Comes"

Single by Paul Anka

from the album Walk a Fine Line
- B-side: "This Is the First Time"
- Released: Spring 1983
- Genre: Soft rock
- Length: 4:40
- Label: Columbia Records
- Songwriters: Paul Anka, David Foster
- Producer: Denny Diante

Paul Anka singles chronology
| "Lady Lay Down" (1981) | "Hold Me 'Til the Morning Comes" (1983) | "Gimme the Word" (1984) |

"Hold Me 'Til the Morning Comes" is a 1983 song by Paul Anka, featuring backing vocals by then Chicago singer Peter Cetera. It was written by Anka with David Foster, and produced by Denny Diante. It was released as the first single from Anka's 1983 album, Walk a Fine Line. It was later included on Anka's 1998 duets album A Body of Work, with re-recorded vocals, keyboards and drums.

== Lyrical content ==
The song describes a man who is in a relationship that's dying, yet both are afraid to walk away from it. They both want to keep the relationship alive, yet both acknowledge that it is not the same anymore, and wonder if the other one still loves them.

== Chart performance ==
The song peaked at number 40 on the Billboard Hot 100 singles chart. It spent four months on the chart, longer than almost all of Anka's other hits, including some of his highest-charting songs. This was his last of 53 charting pop singles in the US. The song also spent three weeks at number two on the US Adult Contemporary chart.

In Canada, the song reached number one on the Adult Contemporary chart in August 1983.

=== Weekly charts ===
| Chart (1983) | Peak position |
|---|---|
| Canadian RPM Adult Contemporary | 1 |
| US Billboard Hot 100 | 40 |
| US Billboard Adult Contemporary | 2 |
| US Cash Box Top 100 | 38 |
