= Best of Times (song) =

Single by Peter Cetera

from the album One More Story
- B-side: "Only Love Knows Why" (Fade)
- Released: October 1988
- Genre: Glam rock; dance-pop
- Length: 4:13 (album version); 4:48 (video version)
- Label: Full Moon; Warner Bros.
- Songwriters: Peter Cetera; Patrick Leonard
- Producers: Peter Cetera; Patrick Leonard

Peter Cetera singles chronology
"You Never Listen to Me" (1988)	"Best of Times" (1988)	"Holding Out" (1989)

"Best of Times" is a song written and performed by American singer-songwriter Peter Cetera. It was written by co-producer Patrick Leonard. It was released as the second single from the album One More Story. The song features Kenny Cetera on backing vocals, who is the brother of Cetera.

"Best of Times" peaked at No. 59 on the Billboard Hot 100 and No. 22 on the Adult Contemporary chart.

== Music video ==
Jim Yukich directed the music video which takes place at a concert. At the beginning of the video, two men talk about going inside the concert, with the short man talking about how excited he is for it, before they go inside to see Cetera performing "Best of Times". After the performance, the two men are about to go inside again when the door slams shut and they both leave. The song "Body Language (There in the Dark)" is heard in the end.

== Personnel ==
- Peter Cetera – lead vocals, backing vocals
- Patrick Leonard – keyboards, synthesizers
- Dann Huff – guitar
- James Harrah – guitar
- Jonathan Moffett – drums
- Paulinho da Costa – percussion
- Kenny Cetera – backing vocals
- Siedah Garrett – backing vocals
- Niki Haris – backing vocals

== Charts ==
Chart (1988)	Peak position
US Billboard Hot 100	59
US Adult Contemporary (Billboard)	22
US Cashbox Top 100 Singles	50
