= Another Perfect World =

Studio album by Peter Cetera
- Released: March 27, 2001
- Recorded: 2000–2001
- Studios: Sound House (Brentwood, Tennessee); Sound Kitchen (Franklin, Tennessee)
- Genre: Rock
- Length: 46:25
- Label: DDE
- Producers: Michael Omartian, Peter Cetera

Peter Cetera chronology
You're the Inspiration: A Collection (1997)	Another Perfect World (2001)	You Just Gotta Love Christmas (2004)

Professional ratings
Review scores
Source	Rating
AllMusic	3/5 stars

Another Perfect World is the sixth studio album by music artist Peter Cetera released in 2001. The track, "Perfect World" peaked at number 21 on the Adult Contemporary chart. Perhaps one of the most notable songs on the album is Cetera's remake of the Lennon-McCartney penned "It's Only Love". It also serves as his last full studio album of original material.

== Track listing ==
1. "Perfect World" (Jim Weatherly, Peter Cetera) – 4:59
2. "Rain Love" (Chris Pelcer, Robert White Johnson, Al Denson) – 4:03
3. "Just Like Love" (Pelcer, Leslie Mills) – 3:38
4. "Feels Like Rain" (Karla Bonoff, Cetera) – 4:43
5. "I'm Coming Home" (Pelcer, Katinka Hartcamp) – 4:23
6. "It's Only Love" (John Lennon, Paul McCartney) – 3:28
7. "Rule the World" (Pelcer, Mills) – 5:08
8. "Have A Little Faith" (J.D. Martin, Cetera) – 5:45
9. "Only Heaven Knows" (Jamie Houston, Martin) – 5:38
10. "Whatever Gets You Through" (Pelcer) – 4:44

== Personnel ==
- Peter Cetera – lead vocals, backing vocals
- Michael Omartian – keyboards, arrangements, backing vocals (8)
- Bruce Gaitsch – acoustic guitar
- Biff Watson – acoustic guitar
- Kenny Greenberg – electric guitar
- George Marinelli – electric guitar
- Jerry McPherson – electric guitar
- Jimmie Lee Sloas – bass (1–3, 5–10)
- Willie Weeks – bass (4)
- John Hammond – drums
- Chris McHugh – drums
- Eric Darken – percussion
- Mark Douthit – saxophones
- Chris McDonald – trombone
- Jeff Bailey – trumpet
- Mike Haynes – trumpet
- Michael Mellett – backing vocals (2, 5)
- Gene Miller – backing vocals (2, 5)
- Chris Rodriguez – backing vocals (2, 5)
- Lisa Bevill – backing vocals (3, 8)
- Tiffany Palmer – backing vocals (3, 8)
- Nicol Sponberg – backing vocals (3, 8)

== Production ==
- Michael Omartian – producer
- Peter Cetera – producer
- Terry Christian – engineer, mixing
- Drew Bollman – mix assistant
- Hank Williams – mastering at MasterMix (Nashville, Tennessee)
- Suzy Martinez – production coordinator
- Sprintz-Hall – cover art, design, photography, tray card art
- d'Bodavus Graphics, Inc. – package graphics
