= One More Story =

Studio album by Peter Cetera
- Released: August 15, 1988
- Recorded: Late 1987–Spring 1988
- Studios: Lion Share Studios (Los Angeles, California); Johnny Yuma Recording (Burbank, California); Chartmaker Studios (Malibu, California)
- Genres: Pop; rock; lounge
- Length: 46:18
- Labels: Full Moon; Warner Bros.
- Producers: Patrick Leonard; Peter Cetera

Peter Cetera chronology
Solitude/Solitaire (1986)	One More Story (1988)	World Falling Down (1992)

Singles from One More Story
- 1. "One Good Woman" Released: July 1988; 2. "Best of Times" Released: October 1988; 3. "Holding Out" Released: 1989

Professional ratings
Review scores
Source	Rating
AllMusic	3/5 stars

One More Story (1988) is the third solo album for music artist Peter Cetera and his second album after leaving the group Chicago. The album was co-produced by Patrick Leonard and Peter Cetera, and contains an appearance by Leonard's most famous artist at the time, Madonna (appearing on the song "Scheherazade" as 'Lulu Smith'). It also features Pink Floyd guitarist David Gilmour on "Body Language" and "You Never Listen to Me", as well as Oak Ridge Boys bass vocalist Richard Sterban and guitarist/vocalist Bonnie Raitt on "Save Me."

One More Story peaked at number 58 on the Billboard 200 chart. Singles include the hit, "One Good Woman," which made it to number four on the Billboard Hot 100, and "Best of Times" peaking at number 59.

"Save Me" was used as the opening theme during the first season of the NBC television show, Baywatch. Incidentally, drummer Tris Imboden appears on this album. He would later join Chicago, replacing original drummer Danny Seraphine. "Heaven Help This Lonely Man" was used on the American daytime serial Santa Barbara. The song "You Never Listen to Me" plays during the first scene of the Miami Vice Season 5 episode, "Redemption In Blood: Part 2," but is not credited on screen.

In a 2024 article for American Songwriter, writer Matt Friedlander includes "You Never Listen to Me" among his list of five "notable" guest performances by David Gilmour. Friedlander calls the Gilmour/Cetera collaboration a "somewhat surprising pairing" and goes on to say, ' “You Never Listen to Me” is a darkly ominous rock ballad about love gone wrong that showcases Gilmour's searing, Floyd-worthy guitar riffs.'

== Track listing ==
All tracks written by Peter Cetera and Patrick Leonard, except where noted.

1. "Best of Times" – 4:13
2. "One Good Woman" – 4:35
3. "Peace of Mind" (Cetera, Leonard, Bill LaBounty) – 4:25
4. "Heaven Help This Lonely Man" – 4:25
5. "Save Me" (Cetera, David Foster) – 4:21
6. "Holding Out" (LaBounty, David Innes) – 5:12
7. "Body Language (There in the Dark)" – 4:44
8. "You Never Listen to Me" – 4:54
9. "Scheherazade" (Cetera, Leonard, Diane Nini) – 5:28
10. "One More Story" – 3:41

== Production ==
- Peter Cetera – producer, Illustration
- Patrick Leonard – producer
- Rick Holbrook – engineer
- Kevin Killen – assistant engineer
- Michael Vail Blum – assistant engineer
- Brian Malouf – mixing at Skip Saylor Recording (Los Angeles, California)
- Doug Sax – mastering at The Mastering Lab (Hollywood, California)
- Ivy Skoff – production coordinator
- Jeri Heiden – art direction, design
- Nicola Dill – photography
- Arthur Spivak and DeMann Entertainment – management

== Personnel ==
- Peter Cetera – lead vocals, backing vocals (1–9), percussion (9)
- Patrick Leonard – keyboards, synthesizers, acoustic piano (2, 10), Hammond organ (3, 5), drum programming (3, 4, 6, 9), horns (7)
- Dann Huff – guitar (1–4, 6, 9), additional guitar (8)
- James Harrah – guitar (1, 3–5, 7)
- Bruce Gaitsch – acoustic guitar (4), guitar (6)
- Bonnie Raitt – guitar (5), backing vocals (5)
- David Williams – guitar (7)
- David Gilmour – guitar solo (7, 8), lead guitar (8)
- Richard Garneau – sitar (9)
- Jerry Watts Jr. – electric bass (4, 9)
- Guy Pratt – bass (8)
- Jonathan Moffett – drums (1, 4–8)
- John Robinson – drums (2)
- Paulinho da Costa – percussion (1, 4, 5, 7)
- Jody Cortez – hi-hat (3)
- Ron Wagner – percussion (5, 9), tabla (9)
- Tris Imboden – hi-hat (9)
- Raja – dunbak (9), first chant (9)
- Kenny Cetera – backing vocals (1, 3, 5, 7, 8)
- Siedah Garrett – backing vocals (1, 3, 8, 9)
- Niki Haris – backing vocals (1, 3, 8, 9)
- Richard Sterban – backing vocals (5)
- Shahrokh – second chant (9)
- Madonna – backing vocals as 'Lulu Smith' (9)
