= Bruce Gaitsch =

- Born: Bruce R. Gaitsch; February 7, 1953 (age 73); Chicago, Illinois, U.S.
- Genres: Rock; hard rock; pop; AOR
- Occupations: Musician; composer; producer
- Instruments: Guitar; vocals; keyboards; sitar; Dobro
- Years active: 1977–present

Bruce R. Gaitsch (/ɡaɪtʃ/ GYCHE; born February 7, 1953) is an American guitarist, composer, and producer. He is best known for working with notable bands and musicians such as Chicago, Peter Cetera, Richard Marx, Madonna, and Agnetha Fältskog as a session musician and songwriter. Gaitsch co-wrote the Madonna song "La Isla Bonita", an international top-five single that earned Gaitsch an award from the American Society of Composers, Authors and Publishers in 1987. He has collaborated numerous times with fellow Chicago native Richard Marx, whose career he was instrumental in launching.

Bruce is married to singer Janey Clewer, with whom he recorded several albums.

== Discography ==
=== Solo albums ===
- 1995 – A Lyre in a Windstorm
- 1997 – Aphasia
- 1998 – Counterpart (with Tommy Denander)
- 1998 – Nightingale
- 2001 – One on One (with Janey Clewer)
- 2002 – Nova
- 2007 – Sincerely
- 2023 – How Fragile We Are
- 2023 – Sacred Ground

=== with the band The Bossa Nova Hotel ===
- 2009 – Moon Island (with Janey Clewer & Michael Sembello)
- 2016 – "Fragile" (single)

=== with the band GIG ===
- 2018 – Brave New World
- 2022 – Wisdom And Madness

=== with the band TIM ===
- 2021 – self-titled album

=== Other appearances ===
- 1977 – Jim Peterik – Don't Fight the Feeling
- 1984 – Barbra Streisand – Emotion
- 1984 – Stephanie Mills – I've Got the Cure
- 1984 – Evelyn "Champagne" King – So Romantic
- 1985 – Evelyn "Champagne" King – A Long Time Coming
- 1986 – Pauli Carman – Dial My Number
- 1986 – Madonna – True Blue
- 1987 – Timothy B. Schmit – Timothy B.
- 1987 – Richie Havens – Simple Things
- 1987 – Richard Marx – Richard Marx
- 1987 – Martha Davis – Policy
- 1987 – Jody Watley – Jody Watley
- 1988 – Gary Wright – Who I Am
- 1988 – Nick Kamen – Us
- 1988 – Glenn Frey – Soul Searchin'
- 1988 – Peter Cetera – One More Story
- 1988 – Julio Iglesias – Non Stop
- 1988 – Siedah Garrett – Kiss of Life
- 1988 – Agnetha Fältskog – I Stand Alone
- 1989 – Nicolas Peyrac – J't'aimais trop j't'aimerai tellement
- 1989 – Stacey Q – Nights Like This
- 1989 – Richard Marx – Repeat Offender
- 1989 – Julian Lennon – Mr. Jordan
- 1989 – Madonna – Like A Prayer
- 1989 – Poco – Legacy
- 1990 – Timothy B. Schmit – Tell Me The Truth
- 1990 – Glenn Medeiros – Glenn Medeiros
- 1990 – Marc Jordan – C.O.W.
- 1991 – Richard Marx – Rush Street
- 1991 – Tommy Page – From The Heart
- 1992 – Peter Cetera – World Falling Down
- 1992 – Freddie Jackson – Time For Love
- 1992 – Céline Dion – Celine Dion
- 1992 – Bill Champlin – Burn Down the Night
- 1992 – Restless Heart – Big Iron Horses
- 1992 – Roger Waters – Amused To Death
- 1993 – Jay Graydon – Airplay for the Planet
- 1993 – Miho Nakayama – Wagamama na Actress
- 1994 – Ednita Nazario – Pasiones
- 1994 – Richard Marx – Paid Vacation
- 1994 – 4Him – The Ride
- 1995 – Dionne Farris – Wild Seed – Wild Flower
- 1995 – Mark Winkler – Tales From Hollywood
- 1995 – Peter Cetera – One Clear Voice
- 1995 – Chicago – Night & Day: Big Band
- 1995 – Sheena Easton – My Cherie
- 1995 – Thomas Anders – Souled
- 1995 – Michael W. Smith – I'll Lead You Home
- 1995 – Bill Champlin – He Started To Sing
- 1995 – Janey Clewer – Janey
- 1996 – Tamara Champlin – You Won't Get To Heaven Alive
- 1996 – Bill Champlin – Through It All
- 1996 – 4Him – The Message
- 1996 – Fee Waybill – Don't Be Scared by These Hands
- 1996 – Amy Sky – Cool Rain
- 1996 – Janey Clewer – Call Me Romantic
- 1997 – Amy Morriss – Within The Sound of Your Voice
- 1997 – Lara Fabian – Pure
- 1997 – Richard Marx – Flesh and Bone
- 1997 – Phillips Craig & Dean – Where Strength Begins
- 1997 – Janey Clewer – When Stars Collide
- 1998 – Deborah Franco – Deborah Franco
- 1998 – Janey Clewer – Kiss By Kiss
- 1999 – Yolanda Adams – Mountain High...Valley Low
- 2000 – Wayne Watson – Wayne Watson
- 2000 – Kenny Rogers – There You Go Again
- 2000 – Elton John – The Road To El Dorado
- 2000 – Tammy Trent – Set You Free
- 2000 – Richard Marx – Days in Avalon
- 2000 – Gladys Knight – At Last
- 2000 – 4Him – Hymns: A Place of Worship
- 2001 – Kelly Keagy – Time Passes
- 2001 – Elton John – Songs from the West Coast
- 2001 – Jim Brickman – Simple Things
- 2001 – Hanne Boel – My Kindred Spirit
- 2001 – Peter Cetera – Another Perfect World
- 2001 – Charlotte Church – Enchantment
- 2002 – – L.A. Reflection
- 2002 – Jim Brickman – Valentine
- 2002 – Chris Tomlin – Not to Us
- 2003 – Jim Brickman – Valentine
- 2003 – Amy Grant – Simple Things
- 2003 – Ilse DeLange – Clean Up
- 2003 – AOR Dreaming Of L.A
- 2003 – Rodney Atkins – Honesty
- 2004 – AOR Nothing But The Best
- 2004 – Joshua Payne – Your Love, My Home
- 2004 – Peter Cetera – You Just Gotta Love Christmas
- 2004 – Bebo Norman – Try
- 2004 – Richard Marx – My Own Best Enemy
- 2004 – Joe Cocker – Heart & Soul
- 2004 – Beth Nielsen Chapman – Look
- 2004 – Michael W. Smith – Healing Rain
- 2004 – Janey Clewer – Perfume
- 2005 – Peter Cetera – Faithfully
- 2005 – Cy Curnin – Mayfly
- 2005 – Toni Braxton – Libra
- 2006 – Michael W. Smith – Stand
- 2006 – Kelly Keagy – I'm Alive
- 2007 – Michael Paige – Michael Paige
- 2008 – Richard Marx – Sundown
- 2008 – Bill Champlin – No Place Left To Fall
- 2008 – Chicago – Chicago XXXII: Stone of Sisyphus
- 2008 – Richard Marx – Emotional Remains
- 2009 – Adele Morgan – This One Life
- 2010 – AOR L.A Ambition
- 2011 – George Canyon – Better Be Home Soon
- 2011 – Richard Marx – Stories To Tell
- 2011 – Lionville – Lionville
- 2012 – AOR L.A Temptation
- 2012 – Harry Shearer – Can't Take A Hint
- 2012 – Janey Clewer – Fallen For Brazil
- 2012 – Janey Clewer – Love
- 2013 – Fergie Frederiksen – Any Given Moment
- 2013 – Lara Fabian – Le Secret
- 2014 – Waylon – Heaven After Midnight
- 2014 – Beth Nielsen Chapman – Uncovered
- 2014 – Richard Marx – Beautiful Goodbye
- 2014 – Adam Cohen – Like a Man
- 2018 – Janey Clewer – Beautifully Broken
- 2020 – Van de Forst – Unconditional
- 2020 – Lionville – Magic is Alive
- 2021 – Michael Kratz – TAFKATNO
- 2021 – Bill Champlin – Livin' For Love
- 2022 – Lionville – So close to heaven
- 2022 – Chicago – Born For This Moment
