= Steve Kolander =

American singer-songwriter

- Born: November 15, 1961 (age 63); Lake Charles, Louisiana, U.S.
- Origin: Nashville, Tennessee, U.S.
- Genres: Country
- Occupation: Singer-songwriter
- Instrument(s): Vocals, guitar
- Years active: 1994–present
- Labels: River North, Beach Bay
- Website: http://www.kolander.com/

Steve Kolander (born November 15, 1961) is an American country music artist. He debuted in 1994 with the release of his self-titled album on River North Records. It produced two singles on the Hot Country Songs charts. A second album for River North, Pieces of a Puzzle, was released in 1996, followed by the independently released Light to Dark in 2007.

Before he became a recording artist, Kolander worked as an advertising executive.

== Discography ==
=== Albums ===
Title	Album details
Steve Kolander	Release date: August 23, 1994; Label: River North Nashville
Pieces of a Puzzle	Release date: October 29, 1996; Label: River North Nashville
Light to Dark	Release date: 2007; Label: Beach Bay

=== Singles ===
Year	Single	Peak chart positions		Album
Year	Single	US Country	CAN Country	Album
1994	"Listen to Your Woman"	63	—	Steve Kolander
1995	"Black Dresses"	70	—	Steve Kolander
1996	"Pieces of a Puzzle"	—	—	Pieces of a Puzzle
1997	"Still Crazy 'bout You"	—	93	Pieces of a Puzzle
2007	"That's Not All"	—	—	Light to Dark

=== Music videos ===
Year	Video	Director
1994	"Listen to Your Woman"	Chris Rogers
1995	"Black Dresses"	Chris Rogers
