= Ronna Reeves =

American country singer-songwriter (born 1966)

- Born: Ronna Renee Reeves; September 21, 1966 (age 59); Big Spring, Texas, U.S.
- Genres: Country
- Occupation: singer
- Instrument: Vocals
- Years active: 1990–1998
- Labels: Mercury Nashville; River North; Enterprise Music

Ronna Renee Reeves (born September 21, 1966) is an American country music singer. Between 1990 and 1998, she released five studio albums, including three on Mercury Records; she has also charted five singles on the Hot Country Songs charts. She was also nominated for Top New Female Vocalist at the Academy of Country Music Awards in 1992. Her highest-charting single was "The More I Learn (The Less I Understand About Love)", which reached No. 49 in 1992.

In 1993, she was named one of the New Faces of Country Music by the Country Radio Seminar.

After leaving Mercury in 1994, Reeves signed to River North Records and released two more albums. The second album she recorded for River North Records, Day 14, was more pop-oriented and she simply went by Ronna. She recorded a duet "There's Love on the Line" with Sammy Kershaw on her album The More I Learn as well a duet with Peter Cetera, on a cover of ABBA's "SOS", on his album One Clear Voice.

She is perhaps best remembered as a regular on The Statler Brothers Show during the mid-1990s, as well as opening act on many of their tours.

Since 2010, Reeves has owned Showbiz-Ro Music, an independent Songplugging & Writer Management Service, in Nashville, Tennessee, alongside Liz Morin.

== Discography ==
=== Albums ===
Title	Album details	Peak positions
Title	Album details	US Country
Only the Heart	Release date: July 9, 1991; Label: PolyGram/Mercury; Formats: CD, Cassette	—
The More I Learn	Release date: March 17, 1992; Label: PolyGram/Mercury; Formats: CD, Cassette	72
What Comes Naturally	Release date: September 27, 1993; Label: PolyGram/Mercury; Formats: CD, Cassette	—
After the Dance	Release date: November 7, 1995; Label: River North Nashville; Formats: CD, Cassette	—
Day 14	Release date: May 19, 1998; Label: River North Nashville; Formats: CD, Cassette	—

=== Singles ===
Year	Single	Peak chart positions		Album
Year	Single	US Country	CAN Country	Album
1990	"Sadly Mistaken"	—	—	Only the Heart
1990	"The Letter"	—	—	Only the Heart
1991	"That's More About Love (Than I Wanted to Know)"	—	—	Only the Heart
1991	"Ain't No Future in the Past"	—	—	Only the Heart
1992	"The More I Learn (The Less I Understand About Love)"	49	89	The More I Learn
1992	"What If You're Wrong"	70	75	The More I Learn
1992	"We Can Hold Our Own"	71	86	The More I Learn
1993	"Never Let Him See Me Cry"	73	85	What Comes Naturally
1993	"He's My Weakness"	74	—	What Comes Naturally
1996	"My Heart Wasn't in It"	—	—	After the Dance
1996	"Collect from Wichita"	—	—	After the Dance
1996	"Rodeo Man"	—	—	After the Dance
1998	"Sweet Pretender"	—	—	Day 14
"—" denotes releases that did not chart

=== Music videos ===
Year	Video	Director
1992	"The More I Learn (The Less I Understand About Love)"	Peter Lippman
1992	"What If You're Wrong"	Thom Ferrell
1992	"We Can Hold Our Own"	Steve McWilliams
1993	"Never Let Him See Me Cry"	Alan Chebot
1993	"He's My Weakness"	Sara Nichols
1996	"My Heart Wasn't in It"	Sara Nichols
1996	"Rodeo Man"	Steven R. Monroe
1998	"Sweet Pretender"	

== Awards and nominations ==
Year	Organization	Award	Nominee/Work	Result
1992	Academy of Country Music Awards	Top New Female Vocalist	Ronna Reeves	Nominated
