= After All (Cher and Peter Cetera song) =

Single by Cher and Peter Cetera

from the album Heart of Stone
- B-side: "Dangerous Times"
- Released: March 3, 1989
- Recorded: 1988
- Genre: Soft rock
- Length: 4:03
- Label: Geffen
- Songwriters: Dean Pitchford; Tom Snow
- Producer: Peter Asher

Cher singles chronology
"Main Man" (1988)	"After All" (1989)	"If I Could Turn Back Time" (1989)

Peter Cetera singles chronology
"Holding Out" (1989)	"After All" (1989)	"Restless Heart" (1992)

"After All" is a song performed as a duet by American singers Cher and Peter Cetera, released on March 3, 1989 by Geffen Records. It was used as the love theme for the film Chances Are and was nominated for the Academy Award for Best Original Song at the 62nd Academy Awards. The song was also the first North American single release from Cher's nineteenth album Heart of Stone. The song appears on Peter Cetera's 1997 album You're The Inspiration – A Collection and his 2017 album, The Very Best of Peter Cetera.

== Chart information ==
The single peaked at number six on the U.S. Billboard Hot 100 and at No. 5 in Canada. It also managed to enter some European charts, including Ireland, where it peaked at No. 24 on the Irish Singles Chart, and the United Kingdom, where it reached No. 84 on the UK Singles Chart.

"After All" also became Cher's first solo number one hit on the Adult Contemporary chart in the United States. Her earlier number one was in 1971 when Sonny & Cher's "All I Ever Need Is You" spent five weeks at the top. In a 2014 article in Billboard, writer Keith Caulfield listed "After All" as Cher's ninth biggest chart hit. The song was ranked number 79 on US Billboard Year-end Hot 100 singles of 1989. The song found strong success stateside, but no video was ever made to further promote it. It was certified gold by the RIAA for sales of 500,000 copies. As of November 2011, Billboard reported the digital sales of "After All" to be 226,000 in the US.

== Live performances ==
At the 62nd Academy Awards in 1990, the song was performed by James Ingram and Melissa Manchester.

Cher and Cetera have never performed the song together live. Cher performed a solo version of the song during her Heart of Stone and Love Hurts tours. She then performed it with her keyboardist/musical director, Paul Mirkovich, for her Do You Believe? tour and Living Proof: The Farewell Tour. She also performed it in her residencies Cher at the Colosseum and Classic Cher, as well as during her Here We Go Again Tour. The latter performances would accompany a video montage of Cher in film, which would start before the song begins.

Since the early 2000s, Peter Cetera has been performing "After All" during his live performances as a duet with female backing vocalists including Kim Keyes, Jamelle Fraley, and Tania Hancheroff.

== Track listing ==
- US and European 7" and cassette single
1. "After All" – 4:06
2. "Dangerous Times" – 3:00
- European 12" and CD single
1. "After All"
2. "Dangerous Times"
3. "I Found Someone"
4. "Main Man"

== Personnel ==
- Cher, Peter Cetera – vocals
- Robbie Buchanan, Jon Gilutin – keyboards
- Michael Landau, Waddy Wachtel – guitars
- Leland Sklar – bass
- Carlos Vega – drums
- David Campbell – string arrangements and conductor

== Charts ==
=== Weekly charts ===
1989 weekly chart performance for "After All"
Chart (1989)	Peak position
Australia (ARIA)	50
Canada Top Singles (RPM)	5
Canada (The Record)	6
Ireland (IRMA)	24
Quebec (ADISQ)	20
UK Singles (Official Charts)	84
US Billboard Hot 100	6
US Adult Contemporary (Billboard)	1
US Cash Box Top 100	7

=== Year-end charts ===
Year-end chart performance for "After All"
Chart (1989)	Position
Canada Top Singles (RPM)	67
US Billboard Hot 100	79
US Adult Contemporary (Billboard)	5

== Certifications and sales ==
Certifications and sales for "After All"
Region	Certification	Certified units/sales
United States (RIAA)	Gold	500,000^{^}
^{^} Shipments figures based on certification alone.
