= Chances Are (film) =

1989 film by Emile Ardolino

- Theatrical release poster
- Directed by: Emile Ardolino
- Written by: Perry Howze; Randy Howze
- Produced by: Mike Lobell
- Starring: Cybill Shepherd; Robert Downey Jr.; Ryan O'Neal; Mary Stuart Masterson
- Cinematography: William A. Fraker
- Edited by: Harry Keramidas
- Music by: Maurice Jarre
- Color process: Metrocolor
- Distributed by: Tri-Star Pictures
- Release date: March 10, 1989
- Running time: 108 minutes
- Country: United States
- Language: English
- Budget: $16 million
- Box office: $16.3 million

Chances Are is a 1989 American romantic fantasy comedy film directed by Emile Ardolino and starring Cybill Shepherd, Robert Downey Jr., Ryan O'Neal, and Mary Stuart Masterson in Panavision. The original music score was composed by Maurice Jarre.

== Plot ==
Young district attorney Louis Jeffries III is hit by a car and dies in 1964, but manages to slip by the pearly gates and is reborn as Alex Finch. In 1987, twenty three years later, his widow Corinne still misses him, ignoring the devotion of his best friend Phillip Train, who has raised Louis's only daughter Miranda as his own. Miranda, while a student at Yale University, meets Alex, who works in the library but is about to graduate.

After graduation, Alex heads to Washington, D.C., and reaches the offices of The Washington Post. His first attempts to meet with Ben Bradlee thwarted, he schemes his way into his office by pretending to be a delivery man.

Alex walks into Bradlee's office, with Phillip behind him. Confounded by the young man, Bradlee asks who he is. When Alex attempts to remind him of their meeting at Yale, Phillip vouches for him, which changes his mind about giving him a meeting. However, Bradlee feels Alex needs more time working on smaller papers before he can offer him a job. Feeling defeated, Alex leaves his office.

Phillip finds Alex in the lobby and offers him a ride, during which Phillip invites Alex to meet the Jeffries family over dinner. While at the Jeffries' home, which he had never visited, Alex begins to have flashbacks of a previous life. Anguished, he begins to act crazed and confused. Alex eventually realizes that he is Louis Jeffries reincarnated.

Miranda, wanting to continue the flirtation that started when they met, is confused when Alex rebuffs her, sending her to her room when she kisses him. Alex then goes to Corinne and tries to convince her that he is Louis. At first she does not believe him, but he mentions details about their life together that only Louis would know.

Corinne gives in, and she and Alex kiss. Taking a trip together away from town, she is disturbed when people think that Alex is her son. Louis/Alex wants to have sex, but Corinne reveals she has not had sex since Louis died.

One night, when Alex and Corinne are together, they are caught by Phillip, who accuses Alex of being a gold digger. Louis/Alex then reminds Phillip he declared his love for Corinne to Louis on their wedding day. Phillip is confused and tries to punch him but gets knocked out instead. Corinne rushes to Phillip's side, and yells at Alex to leave the room. Louis/Alex realizes then that she loves Phillip too, so Louis must let go.

Corinne slips a note under Alex's door, apologizing and saying that she will visit him later. Alex puts the still-unconscious Phillip in his bed, so that when Corinne arrives, thinking that he is Louis, she accidentally kisses Phillip. He is ecstatic, and Corinne realizes she loves him too. They have sex.

Alex spends the night in his car. The next day, he bursts into a courtroom and accuses Judge Harrison Fenwick of accepting a bribe (Alex remembers himself as Louis taking incriminating photographs of Fenwick in 1964). Phillip, who is also in the courtroom, realizes that only Louis would know that fact, and now believes Alex is Louis. Alex tells Phillip the location of his camera with the photographs.

Attempting to escape from the commotion in the courtroom, Alex falls down the stairs, hits his head, and ends up in the hospital. While unconscious, Omar the angel visits him, and gives him the special "shot" he should have gotten twenty-three years before, to forget his past life.

When Alex wakes up, he has forgotten about being Louis. The last thing he remembers is kissing Miranda in the kitchen of her house. She is relieved and delighted.

Newspaper headlines show Fenwick charged with accepting the bribe. Impressed by Alex's journalistic prowess in exposing the corrupt Fenwick, Bradlee offers him a job as a reporter at the Post. Corinne and Phillip get married, and at their wedding, Alex says that he is in love with Miranda, just as Phillip told Louis he was in love with Corinne on their wedding day all those years earlier.

== Cast ==
- Cybill Shepherd as Corinne Jeffries
- Robert Downey Jr. as Alex Finch/Louis Jeffries III
- Ryan O'Neal as Phillip Train
- Mary Stuart Masterson as Miranda Jeffries
- Christopher McDonald as Louis Jeffries
- Josef Sommer as Judge Harrison Fenwick
- Joe Grifasi as Omar
- Henderson Forsythe as Ben Bradlee
- Fran Ryan as Mavis Talmadge
- James Noble as Dr. Bailey
- Marc McClure as Richard
- Susan Ruttan as Woman in the Bookstore
- Mimi Kennedy as Sally
- Kathleen Freeman as Mrs. Handy
- Dennis Patrick as Archibald Blair
- Martin Garner as Mr. Zellerbach
- Gianni Russo as Anthony Bonino
- Lester Lanin as Conductor

== Production ==
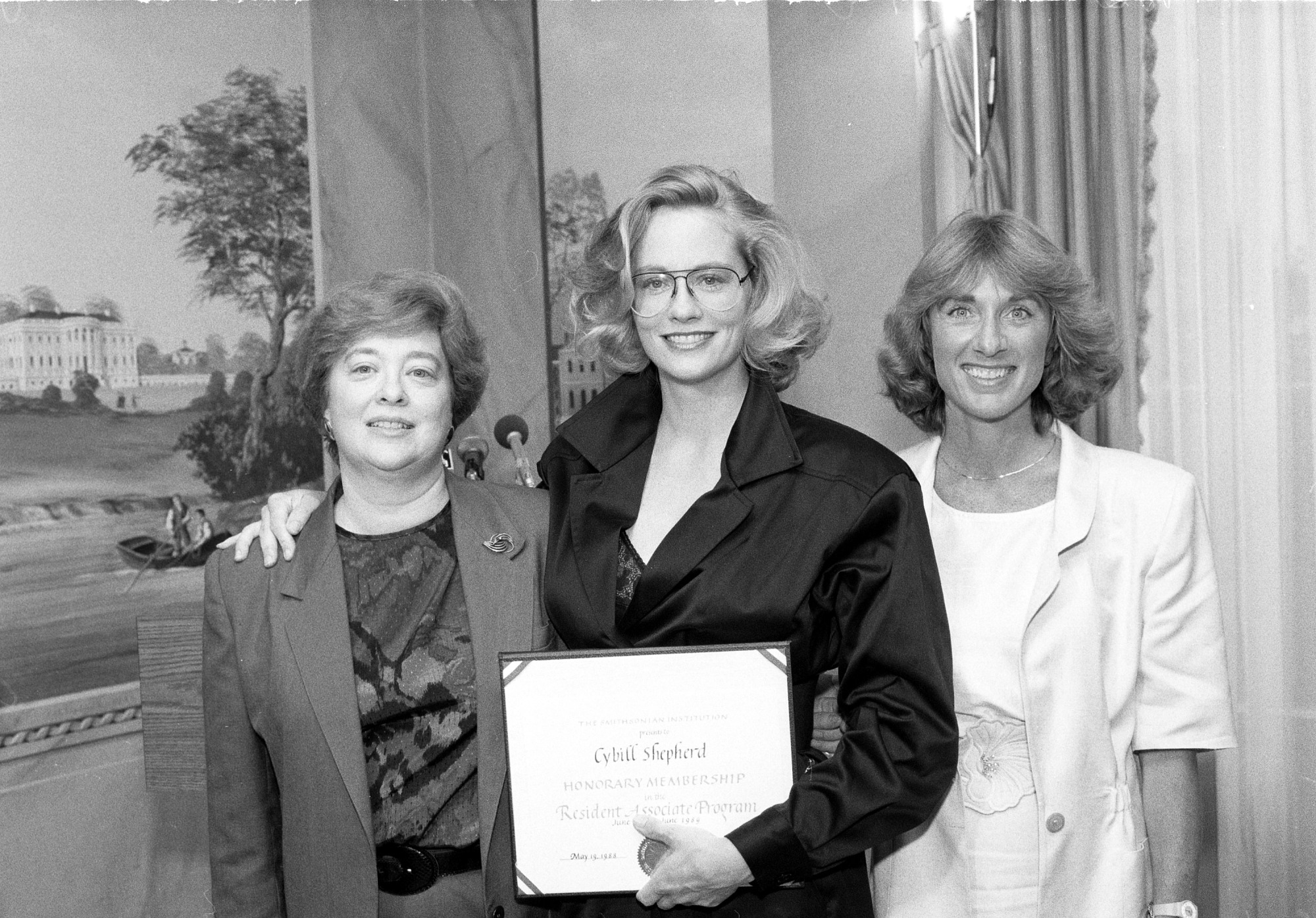
Cybill Shepherd inside the "Smithsonian Castle" during the filming of Chances Are, where she plays a Smithsonian curator. She is presented with an honorary Resident Associate Program membership, by (l.) National Museum of American History (NMAH) Curator Edith Mayo and NMAH Director of External Affairs, Marilyn Lyons

The film was known prior to production as Life After Life and Unforgettable.

Chances Are was Cybill Shepherd's first film in a number of years. Her profile had risen since she starred in the television series Moonlighting, and she made the film during a production hiatus from the series.

Many scenes were filmed in Georgetown, along the National Mall, Glen Echo Park, Smithsonian museums, and other parts of Washington, D.C.

== Reception ==
Chances Are received generally positive reviews from critics, but did not do well at the box office. As of May 2024, the film holds a rating of 67% on Rotten Tomatoes from 33 reviews.

Roger Ebert of The Chicago Sun Times gave the film 3 and 1/2 out of 4 stars saying, "Chances Are is a lighthearted romance about reincarnation, told with wit and a certain irony."

=== Awards and nominations ===
Award	Category	Nominee(s)	Result
Academy Awards	Best Original Song	"After All"; Music by Tom Snow; Lyrics by Dean Pitchford	Nominated
BMI Film & TV Awards	Most Performed Song from a Film	"After All"; Music by Tom Snow; Lyrics by Dean Pitchford	Won
Golden Globe Awards	Best Original Song – Motion Picture	"After All"; Music by Tom Snow; Lyrics by Dean Pitchford	Nominated

== Soundtrack ==
The soundtrack included the Billboard Hot 100 Top 10 single hit song "After All" (composed by Tom Snow and lyrics by Dean Pitchford) performed by Cher and Peter Cetera. The song peaked at No. 6 on the Hot 100 in May 1989. Also featured is the song of the same title as the film sung by Johnny Mathis. Although the film contains other songs, a soundtrack album has never been released.

== See also ==
- List of films about angels
