= Feels Like Heaven (Peter Cetera and Chaka Khan song) =

Single by Peter Cetera and Chaka Khan

from the album World Falling Down
- B-side: "World Falling Down"
- Released: October 1992
- Recorded: 1991
- Genre: Soft rock
- Length: 4:48 (album version); 3:55 (radio edit)
- Label: Full Moon; Warner Bros.
- Songwriters: Mark Goldenberg; Kit Hain
- Producers: Peter Cetera; Andy Hill

Peter Cetera singles chronology
"Restless Heart" (1992)	"Feels Like Heaven" (1992)	"Even a Fool Can See" (1993)

Chaka Khan singles chronology
"Give Me All" (1992)	"Feels Like Heaven" (1992)	"I Want" (1992)

"Feels Like Heaven" is a song by Peter Cetera. It is a duet between Cetera and Chaka Khan. It was released in 1992 from Cetera's fourth album World Falling Down. It was written by Mark Goldenberg and Kit Hain and produced by Cetera and Andy Hill. The single peaked at No. 71 on the Billboard Hot 100 and No. 5 on the Adult Contemporary chart.

== Background ==
"Feels Like Heaven" was originally going to feature Lorrie Morgan instead of Khan before the song was recorded. However, she abandoned the idea, and Khan was chosen instead, with whom Cetera planned to sing.

== Music video ==
Piers Plowden directed a music video for the song. It features Cetera and Khan singing in a hallway.

== Personnel ==
- Peter Cetera – lead vocals
- Chaka Khan – lead vocals
- Andy Hill – keyboards, programming, acoustic guitar
- C. J. Vanston – additional keyboards
- Peter-John Vettese – additional piano
- Tim Pierce – electric guitar
- Pino Palladino – bass
- Graham Broad – drums
- Tal Bergman – percussion
- Chris Mostert – saxophone, sax solo

== Charts ==
Chart (1993)	Peak position
US Billboard Hot 100	71
US Adult Contemporary (Billboard)	5
US Cashbox	68
