= Peter Cetera =

American musician (born 1944)

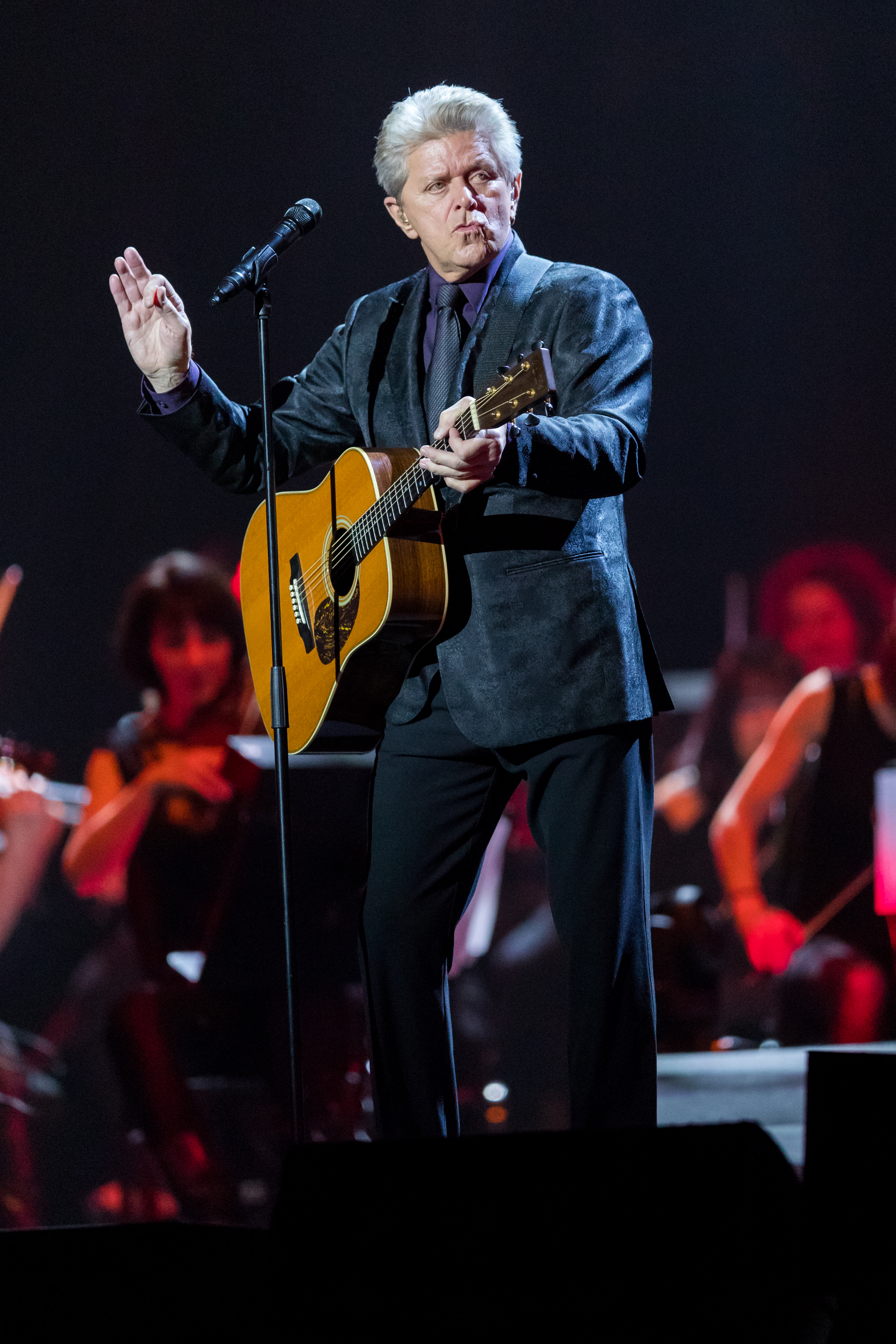
- Cetera in 2017

Background information
- Born: Peter Paul Cetera Jr. September 13, 1944 (age 82); Chicago, Illinois, U.S.
- Genres: Rock; soft rock; jazz fusion
- Occupations: Musician; singer; songwriter
- Instruments: Vocals; bass guitar; guitar
- Years active: 1962–2019
- Labels: Warner Bros; Full Moon; River North; DDE; Viastar
- Formerly of: Chicago
- Website: petercetera.com

Peter Paul Cetera Jr. (/səˈtɛrə/ sə-TERR-ə; born September 13, 1944) is an American retired musician best known for being a frontman, vocalist, and bassist for the American rock band Chicago from 1967 until his departure in 1985. His career as a recording artist encompasses 17 albums with Chicago (Chicago Transit Authority through Chicago 17) and six solo studio albums. As a lead singer/vocal artist he has had four number one songs on the Billboard Hot 100, two during his tenure with Chicago and two during his solo career. Of those four songs he wrote or co-wrote three.

As a solo artist, Cetera has scored six Top 40 singles, including two that reached number one on Billboard's Hot 100 chart in 1986, "Glory of Love" and "The Next Time I Fall". The former was the theme song from the film The Karate Kid Part II (1986), was co-written by Cetera, David Foster, and Diane Nini and was nominated for both an Academy Award and a Golden Globe Award for best original song from a motion picture. In 1987, Cetera received an ASCAP award for "Glory of Love" in the category "Most Performed Songs from Motion Pictures". His performance on "Glory of Love" was nominated for a Grammy Award for best pop male vocal. That same year Cetera and Amy Grant, who performed as a duet on "The Next Time I Fall", were nominated for a Grammy Award for best vocal performance by a pop duo or group. Besides Foster and Grant, Cetera has collaborated throughout his career with other recording artists from various genres of music. His songs have been featured in soundtracks for movies and television.

With "If You Leave Me Now", a song written and sung by Cetera on the group's tenth album, Chicago received its first Grammy Award. It was also the group's first number one single. Chicago's second number one song, "Hard to Say I'm Sorry", came from the album Chicago 16 in 1982. It was co-written by Cetera and the group's producer, David Foster and Cetera sang the lead vocal. Chicago's first album, Chicago Transit Authority (Columbia, 1969), featuring Cetera on bass and vocals, was inducted into the Grammy Hall of Fame in 2014. Cetera was inducted into the Rock and Roll Hall of Fame as a member of Chicago in April 2016, and he, Robert Lamm, and James Pankow were among the 2017 Songwriters Hall of Fame inductees for their songwriting efforts as members of the group. Cetera, along with other members of Chicago, received a Grammy Lifetime Achievement Award in 2020.

== Early life ==
=== Family ===
Former Chicago drummer Danny Seraphine wrote, "Peter came from a strong Catholic blue-collar family ...". Cetera was born to Peter Paul Cetera Sr. and Margareta (Bechtold) Cetera in the Morgan Park neighborhood, located on the far South Side of Chicago, Illinois. He was the second of six children and is of Polish and Hungarian descent. His father worked as a machinist. Cetera's siblings include two brothers, Tim Cetera (who recorded an album with Ricky Nelson in the early 1970s) and Kenny Cetera. Both are listed as contributing musicians on some of the recordings Cetera made with Chicago and on some of his solo recordings.

=== Formal education ===
Cetera attended Archbishop Quigley Preparatory Seminary for one year of high school because, he says, "my mother wanted me to be a priest." He transferred to Mendel Catholic Prep High School, graduated from there in 1962, and is listed among the "Notable Alumni".

=== Musical beginnings ===
Cetera says that his mother "was always singing around the house" and taught the children to sing in harmony while they were doing their household chores. His brother Kenny also remembers the family harmonizing together while growing up. Based on the positive responses he got, Cetera realized around the age of 11 or 12 that he had a talent for singing. Cetera's interest in music deepened when, at 11 years of age, his parents bought him an accordion instead of the guitar he wanted. He says he was "kind of a polka prodigy" and aged 12 won a local talent competition for his accordion-playing. However, his family missed his radio debut when the show was broadcast the following week, because they did not own an FM receiver.

During high school, he started seriously thinking of pursuing a career as a singer. When he was 15, some older students from his high school took him to a club to see a band called the Rebel Rockers, which led to his purchasing an acoustic guitar at Montgomery Ward. He eventually took up the electric bass, and with some high school friends—a drummer, guitarist, and saxophone player—Cetera began playing the local dance circuit, dividing lead vocals with the guitarist.

Cetera's early musical influences include Bo Diddley, Ritchie Valens, Little Richard, Jimmy Reed, and the Ventures. After he embarked on his music career, the Beatles became a prominent influence in his early twenties.

== Professional music career ==
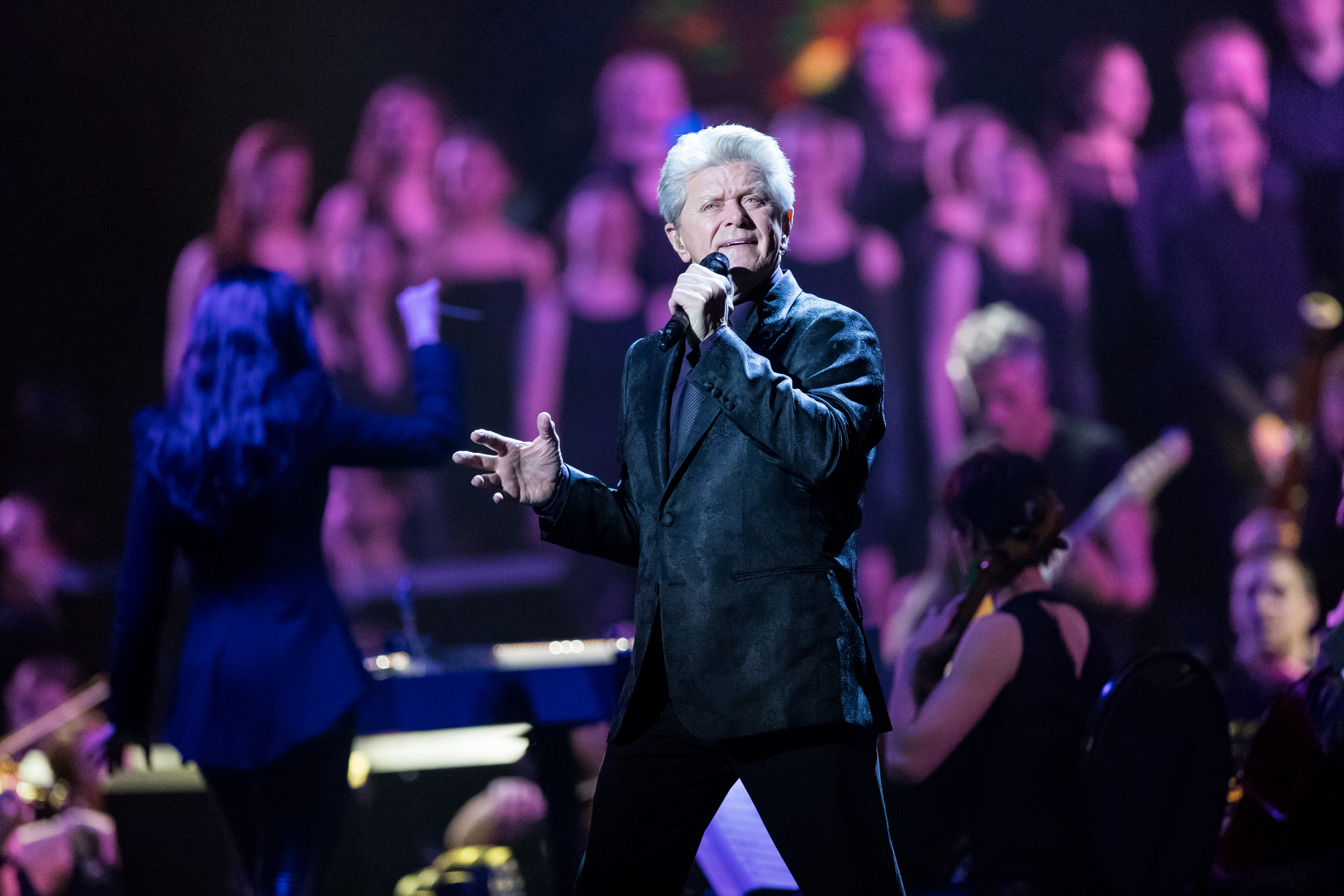
Cetera in 2017

=== History ===
==== The Exceptions ====
Cetera played in several groups in the Chicago area, including a popular local rock band named the Exceptions, which toured the Midwest in the mid-1960s. Cetera said, "By the time I was 18 I was making more money than my dad."

Among Cetera's first recording experiences were several singles and a five-song seven-inch EP titled Rock 'N' Roll Mass with the Exceptions. One of those recorded songs, "Come On Home", also gave Cetera his first songwriting credit. (Kal David and Marty Grebb also are credited on the song.) Adding to his early recording experience, Cetera played electric bass on Chicago folk singer and songwriter Dick Campbell's album Dick Campbell Plays Where It's At, released in 1966 on Mercury Records. When the Exceptions decided to move toward a more psychedelic sound, Cetera left; the band changed its name to Aorta, and became one of the first psychedelic groups on a major label.

==== Tenure in Chicago ====
In December 1967, Cetera arrived early for a show to watch a band called the Big Thing. Impressed by their use of a horn section combined with rock and roll, Cetera left the Exceptions to join the Big Thing within two weeks. The Big Thing, which soon changed its name to the Chicago Transit Authority (and eventually shortened it to Chicago), released its self-titled debut album Chicago Transit Authority on Columbia Records in 1969. Cetera shared lead vocals on three of the eleven songs on the album: "Questions 67 & 68", "I'm a Man", and "Someday", his tenor voice complementing the baritone voices of the two other lead singers in the group, keyboardist Robert Lamm and guitarist Terry Kath.

The follow-up album, Chicago, vaulted the band to popular status throughout the world. The song "25 or 6 to 4" was the first major hit single with Cetera singing lead vocals. Chicago is also notable for featuring Cetera's first songwriting effort with the group, "Where Do We Go From Here?"

As the 1970s progressed, Cetera became a more prolific songwriter for the group, contributing the songs "Wishing You Were Here" and "Happy Man" to the 1974 album Chicago VII. "Wishing You Were Here" featured vocals by members of the Beach Boys, and reached number eleven on the charts. "Happy Man" was, according to Chicago producer James Guercio, "a Number 1 record that was never released as a single." Cetera's biggest singing and songwriting accomplishment with Chicago came in 1976 with the ballad "If You Leave Me Now", from Chicago X. It was the group's first number one single in the United States, also reaching number one on charts worldwide and certified Gold and Platinum by the Recording Industry Association of America (RIAA). The song won a Grammy Award for Chicago, the group's only competitive or standard Grammy Award to date, for the 1976 Best Pop Vocal Performance by a Duo, Group or Chorus, at the 19th Annual Grammy Awards, held on February 19, 1977. According to William James Ruhlmann, biographer of the group, "the success of 'If You Leave Me Now' overshadowed the album from which it came, and also consolidated what by now seemed a definitely stated preference on the part of radio, if not Chicago's audience in general, for lush ballads sung by Peter Cetera over any other style the band might care to put forward." Another success in the same vein followed: Cetera's 1977 composition "Baby, What a Big Surprise", from Chicago XI. The song featured him on lead vocals and made it to number four on the record charts.

During this time Cetera also worked with other recording artists. He, along with a group of other well-known musicians, appeared on the 1976 self-titled debut album by singer-songwriter Angelo. In 1977 Cetera provided background vocals on Beached, an album by Ricci Martin (son of Dean Martin), produced by Ricci Martin's brother-in-law, Carl Wilson of the Beach Boys. Cetera's bandmates James Pankow, Walter Parazaider, and Lee Loughnane also performed on the album. He is credited as one of the background vocalists on Billy Joel's single "My Life", released in 1978, from the album 52nd Street. The following year he collaborated with Karen Carpenter on her self-titled solo album, providing backing vocals for a song that he had written, "Making Love in the Afternoon". That album was not released until 1996 by A&M Records.

By the end of the 1970s, with the rise of disco music, Chicago's popularity declined, culminating in the release of the band's poorest-selling album to that point, Chicago XIV, which peaked at number 71 on the Billboard 200 chart in 1980. Columbia Records subsequently bought out the remainder of Chicago's contract.

In 1981, Cetera released his first solo album, Peter Cetera, on Warner Bros. Records, after personally buying the rights from his previous contract with Columbia Records, who would not release the project. The album peaked at number 143 on the Billboard 200 and was considered a commercial failure. Cetera blamed Warner Bros., claiming that the company refused to promote him as a solo artist out of fear that he would leave Chicago, who had only recently signed with the label. Former bandmate Danny Seraphine agrees with Cetera on this point, and says that the album "... sank like a stone due to lack of record company support. Warner Brothers didn't want it to interfere with their plans for Chicago." Although his debut album was a commercial failure, one single from the album reached the Top 10 on the Top Rock Tracks chart: "Livin' in the Limelight".

In 1982, David Foster was brought in as producer and the resulting group effort was Chicago 16. The album, which peaked at number nine on the Billboard 200 chart, represented a major comeback for Chicago, and leading the way was the hit single co-written by Cetera and Foster and featuring Cetera on lead vocals, "Hard to Say I'm Sorry". It went to number one on the charts, was certified Gold by the RIAA in September of that year, and was nominated for a Grammy Award for Best Pop Performance by a Duo or Group with Vocal. It was also featured in the movie Summer Lovers, starring Daryl Hannah. The second single, "Love Me Tomorrow", also co-written with Foster and sung by Cetera, reached number 22 on the Billboard Hot 100 chart. The third single, "What You're Missing", was yet again sung by Cetera. Cetera, a member of the American Society of Composers, Authors and Publishers (ASCAP), won ASCAP Pop Music Awards in the category, Most Performed Songs, for both "Hard to Say I'm Sorry" and "Love Me Tomorrow", and was honored by ASCAP as a multiple songwriter winner. In 1983, he took a break from his duties as Chicago frontman to add backing vocals on Paul Anka's final U.S. Top 40 hit, "Hold Me 'Til the Mornin' Comes", which debuted in the summer of that year.

When Chicago 17 was released in 1984, it became the veteran band's most successful album in their history, eventually selling over six million copies in the United States alone. All four singles released from the album were sung by Cetera, including three which he co-wrote, and all of them charted in the top 20: "Stay the Night" (number 16), "Hard Habit to Break" (number 3), "You're the Inspiration" (number 3), and "Along Comes a Woman" (number 14). "Hard Habit to Break", written by Steve Kipner and John Lewis Parker, brought three Grammy nominations for Cetera: two nominations as a member of Chicago for Record of the Year and Best Pop Performance by a Duo or Group with Vocal; and outside the group, as a co-nominee with David Foster for Best Vocal Arrangement for Two or More Voices, Cetera's first, and to date only, nomination for vocal arrangement. Cetera won ASCAP honors for most-performed songs for "You're the Inspiration". With the advent of the music video and the growing popularity of MTV, Cetera became the 'face' and public leader of the longtime-faceless band that was Chicago.

==== Departure from Chicago ====
With his newfound popularity, Cetera was interested in recording another solo album. In addition, he had stated his lack of interest for the extensive touring schedule of the band, especially to promote Chicago 17. When the 17 Tour concluded in May 1985, Chicago's management, along with several members of the band, expressed a desire to book another tour for that summer and start working on the group's next album. The two sides could not resolve their differences and Cetera left the band in July 1985; he was replaced by Jason Scheff as both bassist and lead singer. Retrospectively Cetera said he wanted an arrangement similar to the one that Phil Collins and Genesis had at the time, with Collins being a member and touring with Genesis, while also doing some solo work at the same time, and his former bandmate Danny Seraphine agreed that's what the group should have done. In a 1987 interview, Cetera said about his split from the group, "It wasn't amicable, but it wasn't the worst. It's nothing that me having a hit and them having a hit won't make better."

==== Solo career ====
===== mid-1980s =====
After leaving Chicago, Cetera had immediate success as a solo artist. His first single, "Glory of Love", was used as the theme song for the film The Karate Kid Part II. Co-written by Cetera, David Foster, and Diane Nini, Cetera has said it was written originally for the film, Rocky IV. It was a number one hit on the Billboard Hot 100 and Adult Contemporary charts in the US in 1986, and achieved similar success throughout the world. It went on to win an ASCAP Award for Cetera for Most Performed Songs from Motion Pictures and a BMI Film & TV Award for David Foster for Most Performed Song from a Film. It was also nominated for both an Academy Award and a Golden Globe Award in the category of Best Original Song, as well as a Grammy Award for Best Pop Vocal Performance by a Male Artist. He performed a shortened version of the song live at the 59th Academy Awards ceremony. In two interviews Cetera gave in 1987, he discussed people's confusion about "Glory of Love", and said they thought initially that it was a new song by Chicago. By February of that year, however, he had achieved enough recognition as a solo performer to win the American Video Award for "best new artist".

"Glory of Love" was included on Cetera's second solo album, Solitude/Solitaire, released in 1986. The album was also successful, with more than one million copies sold, and has been certified Gold and Platinum by the RIAA. It produced another number one hit single on both the Billboard Hot 100 and Adult Contemporary charts, "The Next Time I Fall", a duet with Amy Grant. "The Next Time I Fall" was nominated for a Grammy Award for Best Pop Vocal Performance by a Duo or Group. Solitude/Solitaire, which made it to number twenty-three on the Billboard 200 chart, outsold Chicago 18, the first Chicago album without him, which peaked at number thirty-five. Cetera was listed at number nine on Billboard's Top Pop Singles Artists—Male of 1986.

In 1988, he teamed up with producer Patrick Leonard and released his third solo album, One More Story. Cetera and Leonard share writing credits on eight of the ten songs on the album, including the title song and the song "One Good Woman", which became a number four hit single. Leonard also played piano and synthesizers on the album. The album features many well-known music artists, such as Richard Sterban of the Oak Ridge Boys on backup vocals; Bonnie Raitt on guitar and backup vocals on the song "Save Me"; David Gilmour of Pink Floyd on guitar on the songs "Body Language" and "You Never Listen to Me"; and Madonna, who was working with Leonard on her new album at the time, in cameo as 'Lulu Smith' on vocals on the song "Scheherazade". "Save Me", co-written by Cetera and David Foster, was the original opening theme music for the TV show Baywatch. "You Never Listen to Me" plays during the opening scene of the Miami Vice episode "Redemption in Blood: Part 2", though it is not credited.

In 1989, Cetera recorded another duet, this time with Cher, called "After All", which was included on the soundtrack of the movie Chances Are, as well as on Cher's Heart of Stone album. The song was a hit, reaching number six on the US Billboard Hot 100 chart and receiving a Gold certification by the RIAA. In a 2014 article in Billboard, writer Keith Caulfield listed "After All" as Cher's ninth-biggest Billboard hit.

===== 1990s =====
In 1990, a song by Cetera titled "No Explanation" was featured in the soundtrack for the popular film Pretty Woman.

In 1991 Cetera co-wrote (with David Foster and Linda Thompson) and sang on "Voices That Care", a song and supporting documentary music video intended to help boost the morale of American troops involved in Operation Desert Storm, as well as to support the International Red Cross organization. The single reached number eleven on the Billboard Hot 100 and number six on the Billboard Adult Contemporary chart.

In 1992, Cetera's final album on Warner Bros. Records, World Falling Down, was released. It featured the Adult Contemporary number one hit "Restless Heart", as well as two other successful singles: "Even a Fool Can See", and another duet, this time with Chaka Khan, "Feels Like Heaven". The songs made it to number three and number five on the Adult Contemporary chart respectively. "Restless Heart" again won ASCAP honors for Cetera in the category Most-Performed Songs. According to writer Melinda Newman, World Falling Down "lyrically describes the crumbling of his marriage."

In 1995, Cetera released his first album for River North Records, One Clear Voice, which featured the single "(I Wanna Take) Forever Tonight", a duet with actress Crystal Bernard, which peaked at number twenty-three on the Adult Contemporary chart, and number eighty-six on the Hot 100 chart. Following the release of the album, Cetera launched his first solo tour—accompanied by his River North labelmate, country singer Ronna Reeves—lasting into 1996. The tour had been delayed while Cetera recuperated from a motorcycle accident.

1997 brought You're the Inspiration: A Collection, a collection of all his duets from over the years, along with three re-recorded songs he had written while a member of Chicago—"If You Leave Me Now", "You're the Inspiration", and "Baby, What a Big Surprise"—plus two brand-new recordings, "Do You Love Me That Much" and "She Doesn't Need Me Anymore". In a 1997 interview, Cetera said he had to remake the three Chicago songs because Chicago band members refused to release the master recordings for River North Records to use for this album. Although Cetera was at first reluctant to revisit his Chicago material, he soon had a change of heart and said, "I viewed them as what I would do with the songs if they were new today." Additionally, this was the first of Cetera's solo albums to feature "After All", his 1989 duet with Cher from the soundtrack of the movie Chances Are.

Also in the 1990s, Cetera recorded covers of two of his songs from his Chicago days with the R&B vocal group Az Yet. In 1996, Cetera performed a back-up vocal on Az Yet's single of "Hard to Say I'm Sorry" from Chicago 16, titled "Az Yet – Hard to Say I'm Sorry (Featuring Peter Cetera)." The song was nominated, once again, for a Grammy Award, this time in the category of Best R&B Performance by a Duo or Group with Vocal. In 1997, Az Yet performed vocals with Cetera on his single of "You're the Inspiration", from Chicago 17, titled "'You're the Inspiration' – Peter Cetera featuring Az Yet", and they appeared together in a music video featuring the song.

===== 2000s =====
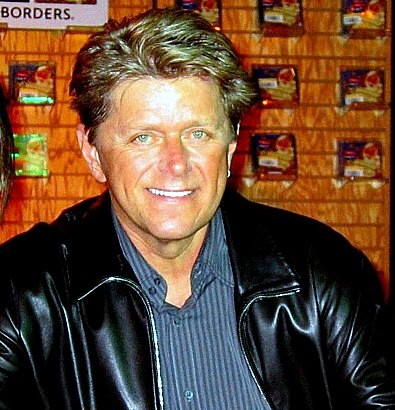
Cetera in 2004 (Age 60)

2001 saw the release of Another Perfect World.

In 2002, Cetera performed a medley of four of his songs at the Concert for World Children's Day, backed by David Foster and an orchestra at Arie Crown Theater in Chicago. The concert aired on PBS and was released in DVD format. This led to his subsequent appearance, in October 2003, with the Chicago Pops Orchestra on the PBS music program Soundstage, which was broadcast throughout the U.S. Amy Grant appeared on the program as a special guest. The program was released on DVD.

From 2003 until summer 2007, Cetera performed a limited number of concerts each year with a 40-piece orchestra, playing re-arrangements of songs from throughout his career, including several from his tenure as a member of Chicago.

In 2004, Cetera released a collection of holiday classics, You Just Gotta Love Christmas. The track "Deck the Halls" features Alison Krauss on vocals with Cetera. The album also features background and duet vocals by his elder daughter, Claire. His younger daughter, Senna, contributed to the CD's artwork. He appeared in the Macy's Thanksgiving Day Parade that year, which was televised nationally, shortly after the release of the album.

In December 2007, Cetera embarked on the You Just Gotta Love Christmas tour of the United States. It marked a return to a traditional rock band show, his first since 1996, featuring songs from his 2004 Christmas album and from throughout his career.

He sang live with the Cleveland Pops Orchestra for Smucker's Presents Hot Ice, Cool Sounds, an event featuring world-class ice skaters performing to the music of Peter Cetera. The show was taped on October 18, 2008, in Youngstown, Ohio, and televised nationally by NBC on December 25, 2008.

===== 2010s =====
Cetera appeared as himself in the 2010 Adult Swim program Tim and Eric Awesome Show, Great Job!, Season 5, Episode 9, "Greene Machine", which also featured the actor Ted Danson. In it, Cetera sings "Little Danson Man".

Cetera formed a new band called the Bad Daddies – a seven-piece electric rock band which performed original material and covers of popular songs, as well as material from Chicago and Cetera's solo career. Cetera played bass on some songs during the shows.

In 2017, Cetera was a co-headliner for Night of the Proms in Germany and Luxembourg, his first time performing in Germany in 35 years.

In autumn 2018 Cetera returned to Europe. In October and November, he performed in London, Dublin, Randers (Denmark), Frankfurt, Hamburg and Berlin. Cetera was scheduled to perform in Sofia, the capital of Bulgaria, on November 9, but according to a September 4, 2018 post on the WeRock.bg website, the show was cancelled.

==== Prospect of a reunion with Chicago ====
During interviews, Cetera has often been asked about the prospect of a reunion with Chicago. While Cetera has compared his departure from the band to the divorce of a married couple, and thus far has declined to perform with the band despite attractive financial offers, he has also said "never say never."

In December 2015, it was announced that the seven original members of Chicago – Cetera, Robert Lamm, Lee Loughnane, Walter Parazaider, James Pankow, Danny Seraphine, and Terry Kath – were to be inducted into the Rock and Roll Hall of Fame, and the induction ceremony was set for April 8, 2016, at the Barclays Center in Brooklyn, New York. Initially Cetera and current band members entertained the possibility of performing together for the induction ceremony. Ultimately, Cetera decided against it. He announced his decision via two posts to his web site, dated February 8 and February 25, 2016, and in those posts expressed his frustration with trying to work out the performance details with band members and show producers. Cetera did not attend the ceremony even to accept his award. Since then there have been indications that a reunion between him and Chicago is unlikely ever to happen. Cetera declined to be interviewed for the 2017 documentary Now More Than Ever: The History of Chicago and the band's episode of VH1's Behind the Music; he also refused the latter show's request to use the songs he wrote while he was in Chicago. He did, however, appear in the documentary The Terry Kath Experience, along with the other surviving members of the original Chicago line-up and producer James William Guercio.

==== Retirement ====
In a podcast interview with Mark Pattison from November 2019, Cetera said he was "done." He explained that he had long wanted to quit performing before he lost his voice, and also cited the amount of travel involved in touring. He continued that he now had to "learn how to be an out-of-work singer." His last live performance was November 23, 2018, for the opening of the Argyros Performing Arts Center in Ketchum, Idaho.

=== Musicianship ===
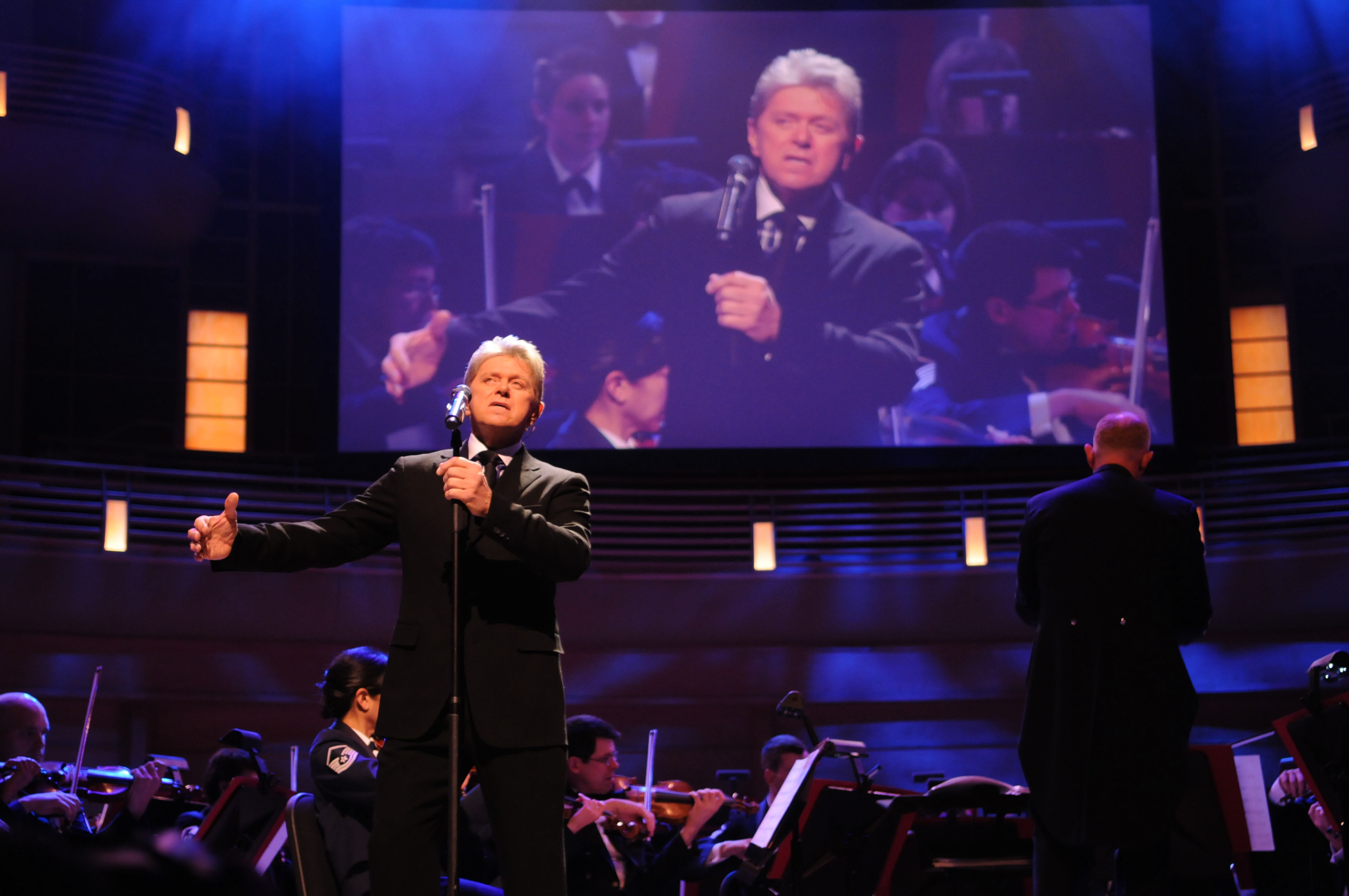
Cetera performing with the United States Air Force Band, 2011

==== Vocal range, singing style and approach to singing ====
Cetera's tenor voice has been labeled "distinctive" and "unmistakable" by music reviewers. In 2018 on the AXS TV show Top 10 Revealed, he was rated number nine of the show's top ten "high note hitters".

Cetera's trademark singing style developed as a result of his having to sing for a period of time with a wired-shut jaw after getting into a brawl at a Los Angeles Dodgers game in 1969.

In 2009 an interviewer noted that Cetera had been around for four decades, called him "one of the most enduring singers around", and asked him how he takes care of his voice. Cetera responded: "'I don't smoke and I don't drink. I try to exercise as much as I can. I do warm-up vocal exercises regularly.'"

For Cetera, recording the vocals with members of the Beach Boys for "Wishing You Were Here" from Chicago VII was satisfying on a personal level, according to William James Ruhlmann. He writes that Cetera said, "There's two people that I always wanted to be, and that was a Beatle or a Beach Boy. …I got to do the background harmonies – myself and Carl Wilson, Dennis Wilson and Al Jardine. For a night, I was a Beach Boy." Cetera had the opportunity, of sorts, to be both a Beatle and a Beach Boy. During a radio interview in 2015, he recalled as one of the highlights of his life a joint concert of Chicago and the Beach Boys when the two groups, who were performing on stage together, were joined by former Beatles drummer Ringo Starr for a rendition of the Beatles song "Got to Get You into My Life".

==== Recognition, popularity and influence as singer ====
Cetera's former Chicago bandmates had high regard for his voice and singing ability. In his autobiographical book, Street Player: My Chicago Story, Danny Seraphine, the original drummer for the band Chicago, recollects that when the group was being formed in the city of Chicago in the 1960s it needed someone who could sing in the high range. Seraphine says Cetera was, at that time, "the best singer in the city". In a 1992 interview, seven years after Cetera had left the group, original band member and woodwinds player Walter Parazaider called Cetera "one of the finest singers in the world" and rated Cetera among his choice of top five singers. In a 2009 interview, former Chicago member Bill Champlin said of Cetera, "I think he's one of the major voices of our time," and that he believed Cetera was one of "maybe the two best tenors on the Earth." In a 2016 documentary about the history of the group, original band member and keyboard player Robert Lamm says, "There were and are a lot of tenor voices in rock and none of them sound like Cetera." In a 2022 interview, Lamm again lauded Cetera as having been an "amazing vocalist" when he was with Chicago.

The music recording industry has recognized Cetera for his singing with Grammy nominations. Five songs on which Cetera sang lead or shared lead vocals were nominated in pop vocal performance categories – "If You Leave Me Now", "Hard to Say I'm Sorry", "Hard Habit to Break", "Glory of Love", and "The Next Time I Fall", with "If You Leave Me Now" winning its category.

Cetera's popularity as a singer in the United States is indicated by the chart successes of songs featuring him on lead vocals. Cetera sang lead vocal on Chicago's first two number one songs on the Billboard Hot 100 chart, "If You Leave Me Now" in 1975, and "Hard to Say I’m Sorry" in 1982. In 1986 he had two more number one songs, "Glory of Love" and "Next Time I Fall", both from his first solo album after leaving the group, Solitude/Solitaire. He sang lead vocal or shared lead vocal on eleven of Chicago's sixteen songs that made it to the top ten on the Billboard Hot 100 chart during the years he was a band member. Cetera has often been dubbed "the voice of Chicago" by writers.

Although Cetera has not gotten a song on the Billboard charts since the 1990s, songs he performed as a member of Chicago and as a solo act continue to pop up in the soundtracks of movies, television programs and commercials and live stage plays. Cetera's composition from the 1976 album Chicago X, "If You Leave Me Now", has appeared in the movies Three Kings (1999), Shaun of the Dead (2004), A Lot like Love (2005), Happy Feet (2006) and Daddy's Home 2 (2017); the television series Sex and the City and South Park; and a television commercial that aired during the 2000 Super Bowl. Robert Lamm's song from the 1970 album Chicago II, "25 or 6 to 4", which was sung by Cetera, was used in the 2017 film I, Tonya, and on the animated TV series King of the Hill. Cetera's number one 1986 song as a solo performer, "Glory of Love", was performed as the finale in the stage show Riot, in 2018 in Sydney, and was used in a 2019 episode of the NBC television series Good Girls. Chicago's 1984 version of the Cetera/Foster song "You're the Inspiration", which is sung by Cetera, was used for the soundtracks of the movies A Hologram for the King and Deadpool (both 2016); a 2017 Super Bowl commercial; and the television series It's Always Sunny in Philadelphia and Criminal Minds. Cetera's music and name have been featured on several episodes of the American television situation comedy series The Goldbergs (2013–2023), set in the 1980s. In 2010, not only was Cetera's music heard during a television commercial for Heineken Premium Light beer but Cetera himself was the subject of discussion. A young man at an assisted-living home holds up a copy of the World Falling Down LP cover and asks one of the residents why he likes Cetera. The older resident replies that he does not like Cetera but the ladies do "and if you love the ladies, by default, you love Cetera." Cetera's song "Restless Heart" from the World Falling Down album is heard playing in the background. In 2022 "Restless Heart", a love song, was used in the Hulu film, Fresh, as a counterpoint to the horror being depicted in the scene. Two songs sung by Cetera, "Glory of Love", and his duet with Cher, "After All", made it on to Pandora's list of "Most-Thumbed Movie Songs Playlist" in 2020.

Cetera has been given the honor of singing at professional sporting events, including at least one time singing the national anthem at a World Series game, the fourth in the series between the Los Angeles Dodgers and the Oakland Athletics in 1988 in Oakland; and at least three times for home team Chicago Cubs at Wrigley Field, where he was guest conductor for "Take Me Out to the Ball Game" during the seventh-inning stretch in 2003, 2007 and 2009 – a duty of some importance according to Jim Oboikowitch, Cubs manager for game and event production, as quoted by Adam McCalvy: "Whenever you come to Wrigley Field, you have two questions ...Who is the starting pitcher? And who is singing the seventh-inning stretch?"

Radio personality Doc Reno wrote in 2024, "Peter Cetera may actually be the king of love songs." The Chicago song, "Hard Habit to Break", in Reno's opinion, "best exemplifies Cetera's pure vocal star power ... better than any of his other power ballads."

==== Bass equipment and playing style ====
Cetera, a mainly self-taught musician who started playing bass guitar during his teenage years, has said he's not the most "knowledgeable" bass player, that he doesn't "really" read music, and that his knowledge of chords "[doesn't] go much past 'Is it major or minor?'" He cites James Jamerson, Paul McCartney and Andy Fraser among his bass influences and says that he was aware of John Entwistle and Jack Bruce. Writing for Bass Player magazine, Stevie Glasgow says, "Peter Cetera's bass (and vocals) were key to Chicago's sound. His tasty 4-string style was forged through a deep knowledge of early rock & roll and R&B, bolstered by a keen melodic sense, astute rhythmic prowess, and a dexterous technique capable of issuing graded nuance and fervent oomph in equal measure." Jeff Coffey, Chicago's bassist and vocalist from 2016 to 2018, gained a new respect for Cetera's bass lines when he joined the band.

Cetera's first bass guitar was a Danelectro Shorthorn. He switched to a Höfner 500/1 to use with the Exceptions. When the Höfner sound was deemed not "bassy or ballsy" enough for Chicago, he replaced it with a 1963 Fender Precision Bass. The Fender became his favorite and it was his usual choice of instrument throughout his 17-year tenure with the band.

Other basses that Cetera has played include the Fender Jazz Bass (in both fretted and fretless versions), Gibson EB-3, Gibson Ripper, Rickenbacker 4001, Steinberger, Ibanez, Music Man StingRay and Spector models. His amplification has varied between Ampeg, Orange, Kustom, Acoustic Control Corporation, Phase Linear and Sound City.

He currently endorses Wilkins basses, as well as Fender Precision Basses and Taurus bass amplification. He is a longtime user of LaBella flatwound bass strings. He briefly switched to the LaBella roundwound strings for a time, but was not satisfied with them and returned to flatwounds. He also uses Fender medium picks.

==== Recognition and influence as bass player ====
Cetera received high praise for his bass playing during his years with Chicago. In his review of a 1969 Chicago concert at the University of Hartford, Ken Cruickshank wrote, "Their bass player, Peter Cetera, is perhaps the fastest and finest I've heard." Reviewing a 1972 live Chicago show at the Greek Theater in Los Angeles, Henry Mendoza, writing for the San Bernardino Sun-Telegram, labeled Cetera's bass work "superb" and said Cetera "emerged as one of rock's finest bassists." After a 1973 performance at Middle Tennessee State University, writer Mike West reported his view of Cetera as more singer than bass player had changed, "His bass work was great, driving to peaks of soul sound." Writer Brown Burnett called Cetera's bass playing "excellent" in his review of Cetera's first solo album, Peter Cetera (1981). In a 2018 review writer Bob Helme said Cetera's bass playing on the song "Hot Streets" is "astounding" and called Cetera "an amazing bassist". In a 2019 article about the recording of the song, "25 or 6 to 4", Matt Hurwitz calls Cetera, "a remarkable bass player."

Cetera was featured in the cover story of the December 2007 issue of Bass Player magazine. Shortly thereafter, he saw former Arkansas governor Mike Huckabee playing bass guitar on television. Cetera sent his compliments, along with an autographed copy of the issue, to Huckabee, who was at that time a presidential hopeful in the 2008 Republican primaries. Huckabee said, "I was totally awestruck to get a letter from Peter Cetera. ...having one of the greatest bass players in my generation give me a compliment is like winning New Hampshire."

Jimmy Haslip, bass guitar player with the Yellowjackets, cites Peter Cetera as one of the bass guitar players who influenced him.

Bass player Will Lee says Peter Cetera influenced his playing, likening Cetera's playing to "a loose McCartney, but with all that Chi-town funk, and just as much taste and melodicism."

==== Songwriting ====
Songs written by Cetera have received popular success. During his years with Chicago nine songs that were written or co-written by Cetera made it into the top twenty on the Billboard Hot 100, and two of them were Chicago's only number one hit songs up to then, "If You Leave Me Now" and "Hard to Say I'm Sorry". As a solo artist he wrote or co-wrote six songs that made it into the Billboard Hot 100, with one, "Glory of Love" making it to number one and "One Good Woman" making it to number four.

Cetera has gained recognition for his songwriting in professional music circles. He is a member of the American Society of Composers, Authors and Publishers (ASCAP), and as a songwriter he has won ASCAP honors in the category "Most Performed Songs" for "Hard to Say I'm Sorry", "Love Me Tomorrow", "You're the Inspiration", "Glory of Love", and "Restless Heart". According to the website SecondHandSongs, "If You Leave Me Now" was covered by nearly one hundred different recording artists from around the world between 1976 and 2018, not including the duet version Cetera recorded with Italian vocalist Filippa Giordano for her 2018 album, Friends and Legends Duets. On February 22, 2017, it was announced that Cetera, Robert Lamm and James Pankow were among the 2017 Songwriters Hall of Fame inductees for their work as members of the music group Chicago. (Cetera did not attend the induction event, held Thursday, June 15, 2017, at the Marriott Marquis Hotel in New York City.) In a 1986 interview, David Foster said of Cetera, "He's the best writing partner I've ever had."

About the process of writing songs, Cetera has said, "I'm like the very bad student who only studies the day before a test! I only tend to write songs when I have a purpose – I need to know that I'm going to do a new album, and then I would start writing. There are not a lot of Peter Cetera songs lying around, because I don't really write a lot of things when I'm not expected to do an album!"

According to William James Ruhlmann, in 1969 the Moon landing, Walter Cronkite and convalescence after having his jaw broken provided Cetera with the right mix of inspiration and available time for him to write his first song with Chicago, "Where Do We Go from Here?", which was included on Chicago's second album. Until that time he did not perceive himself as a songwriter, telling Ruhlmann, "I came from a band that did Top 40 [the Exceptions], …and as far as I was concerned, especially when the Beatles came along, number one, all melodies had already been taken, and, number two, certain people were songwriters and certain people were singers, and I didn't consider myself to be a songwriter."

Cetera also tells Ruhlmann that songs can come to people in "flashes", but without a recording device at hand they're apt to "disappear just exactly the way they come, into thin air." He says about the song "Happy Man", from Chicago VII: "[It] was a song I wrote about midnight driving down the San Diego Freeway on my motorcycle, ...It was the one and only song that I ever remembered, words and music, and I went home and sang it into a tape a day later, and that's how that song came out."

=== Producing credits ===
Cetera co-produced seven of his eight solo albums: Peter Cetera, One More Story, World Falling Down, One Clear Voice, You're the Inspiration: A Collection, Another Perfect World, and You Just Gotta Love Christmas.

Cetera produced the album I Stand Alone by Swedish singer and ABBA member Agnetha Fältskog. It was released in November 1987, and reached number one on Swedish charts. Cetera also appears as a singer and composer on the album. The album featured a duet between Cetera and Fältskog, "I Wasn't the One (Who Said Goodbye)", and he and Bruce Gaitsch co-wrote the title track, "I Stand Alone". Gaitsch is also the album's co-producer, and Cetera's brother, Kenny Cetera, appears on background vocals.

Three years after country singer Ronna Reeves sang a duet with Cetera on his 1995 album, One Clear Voice, Cetera produced Reeves' 1998 album, Day 14. Reeves and Cetera were labelmates on River North Records, and she had accompanied him during his first solo tour in 1995–96.

== Acting credits ==
Cetera has appeared in two movies: Electra Glide in Blue, filmed in 1973, in which he played the character of Bob Zemko; and Sidney Sheldon's Memories of Midnight, a 1991 television movie made for the USA Network, in which he played the role of Larry Douglas.

== Personal life ==
In 1969, Cetera suffered serious injuries when he was assaulted while attending a baseball game at Dodger Stadium with several bandmates. According to Cetera, four Marines took exception to a "long-haired rock 'n' roller" rooting for the Chicago Cubs. He suffered a broken jaw in the attack, spent two days in intensive care and had his jaw wired shut for several months, which ultimately contributed to his distinct vocal style.

In July 1995, just as he was preparing for his first tour as a solo artist, Cetera had a serious accident while riding his Harley-Davidson motorcycle which resulted in 60 stitches in his face. His tour had to be postponed for several months while he recuperated.

Cetera's first marriage was to Janice Sheely.

Cetera married Diane Nini in 1982 and their daughter was born in 1983. Their marriage seemed to have been over by the time his album, World Falling Down, was released in July 1992, according to writer Melinda Newman. Cetera and bandmate Robert Lamm were married to sisters Diane and Julie Nini, respectively.

In 1997, Cetera had a second daughter with then-girlfriend and eventual wife years later Blythe Weber. He met Weber while she was working at River North Records/Platinum Records.

Cetera, a longtime resident of Ketchum, Idaho, has lived in Idaho since the mid-1980s and is a sports enthusiast.

== Discography ==
=== Studio albums ===
- Peter Cetera (1981) – No. 143 US
- Solitude/Solitaire (1986) – No. 23 US, RIAA platinum
- One More Story (1988) – No. 58 US
- World Falling Down (1992) – No. 163 US
- One Clear Voice (1995)
- Another Perfect World (2001)
- You Just Gotta Love Christmas (2004)

=== Live albums ===
- Peter Cetera and Symphony Orchestra - Live in Salt Lake City (2004)

=== Extended plays ===
- Fresh Takes (2021)

=== Compilation albums ===
- You're the Inspiration: A Collection (1997)
- The Very Best of Peter Cetera (2017)
- Love, Glory, Honor & Heart: Complete Full Moon & Warner Bros. Recordings 1981-1992 (2022)

=== Singles ===
Year	Title	Peak chart positions										Album
Year	Title	US CB	US BB	US AC	US Adult	US Main	US Pop	AUS	GER	UK	JPN	Album
1981	"Livin' in the Limelight"	—	—	—	—	6	—	—	—	—	—	Peter Cetera
1982	"On the Line"	—	—	—	—	—	—	—	—	—	—	Peter Cetera
1986	"Glory of Love"	1	1	1	—	—	--	9	24	3	—	Solitude/Solitaire
1986	"The Next Time I Fall" (with Amy Grant)	3	1	1	—	—	--	90	—	78	—	Solitude/Solitaire
1986	"Big Mistake"	55	61	—	—	—	—	—	—	—	—	Solitude/Solitaire
1987	"Only Love Knows Why"	—	—	24	—	—	—	—	—	—	—	Solitude/Solitaire
1987	"Queen of the Masquerade Ball" (promo)	—	—	—	—	—	—	—	—	—	—	Solitude/Solitaire
1987	"Stay with Me" (Germany/Japan only)	—	—	—	—	—	—	—	—	—	40	Princess from the Moon
1988	"You Never Listen to Me" (US promo) (with David Gilmour)	—	—	—	—	32	—	—	—	—	—	One More Story
1988	"One Good Woman"	—	4	1	—	—	--	—	—	82	—	One More Story
1988	"Best of Times"	50	59	22	—	—	—	—	—	—	—	One More Story
1989	"Holding Out"	—	—	—	—	—	—	—	—	—	—	One More Story
1992	"Restless Heart"	—	35	1	—	—	36	89	53	—	—	World Falling Down
1992	"Feels Like Heaven" (with Chaka Khan)	68	71	5	—	—	—	—	—	—	—	World Falling Down
1992	"Even a Fool Can See"	61	68	3	—	—	—	—	—	—	—	World Falling Down
1992	"Man in Me" (Europe only)	—	—	—	—	—	—	—	—	—	—	World Falling Down
1995	"(I Wanna Take) Forever Tonight" (with Crystal Bernard)	—	86	22	33	—	—	89	—	—	—	One Clear Voice
1995	"Faithfully" (US promo)	—	—	13	—	—	—	—	—	—	—	One Clear Voice
1996	"One Clear Voice" (US promo)	—	—	12	—	—	—	—	—	—	—	One Clear Voice
1997	"You're the Inspiration" (featuring Az Yet)	—	77	29	—	—	—	—	—	—	—	You're the Inspiration: A Collection
1997	"Do You Love Me That Much" (US promo)	—	—	6	—	—	—	—	—	—	—	You're the Inspiration: A Collection
1998	"She Doesn't Need Me Anymore" (airplay)	—	—	27	—	—	—	—	—	—	—	You're the Inspiration: A Collection
2001	"Perfect World" (US promo)	—	—	21	—	—	—	—	—	—	—	Another Perfect World
2001	"I'm Coming Home" (US promo)	—	—	—	—	—	—	—	—	—	—	Another Perfect World
2004	"You Just Gotta Love Christmas" (US airplay)	—	—	39	—	—	—	—	—	—	—	You Just Gotta Love Christmas
2004	"Silent Night" (US airplay)	—	—	24	—	—	—	—	—	—	—	You Just Gotta Love Christmas
2004	"Something That Santa Claus Left Behind" (US airplay)	—	—	37	—	—	—	—	—	—	—	You Just Gotta Love Christmas
"—" denotes releases that did not chart

=== Featured singles ===
Year	Single	Main artist	Peak chart positions							Album
Year	Single	Main artist	US Cashbox	US Hot 100	US AC	US R&B	AUS	GER	UK	Album
1983	"Hold Me 'Til the Mornin' Comes"	Paul Anka	38	40	2	—	49	—	—	Walk a Fine Line
1987	"I Wasn't the One (Who Said Goodbye)"	Agnetha Fältskog	—	93	19	—	—	—	—	I Stand Alone
1989	"After All"	Cher	7	6	1	—	50	—	84	Heart of Stone
1991	"Voices That Care"	Various	24	11	6	—	—	—	—	Non-album single
1997	"Hard to Say I'm Sorry"	Az Yet	—	8	14	20	5	72	7	Az Yet

=== Soundtrack appearances ===
- 1982 – Summer Lovers – "Hard to Say I'm Sorry" (performed with Chicago)
- 1983 – Two of a Kind – "Prima Donna" (performed with Chicago)
- 1986 – The Karate Kid Part II – "Glory of Love"
- 1987 – Princess from the Moon (jp) – "Stay with Me"
- 1987 – Three Men and a Baby – "Daddy's Girl"
- 1989 – Chances Are – "After All" (with Cher)
- 1990 – Pretty Woman – "No Explanation"
- 2016 – Deadpool – "You're the Inspiration" (performed with Chicago)
- 2022 – Fresh – "Restless Heart"

=== Music videos ===
Year	Title	Director	ref
1986	"Glory of Love"	Peter Sinclair	
1986	"The Next Time I Fall" (featuring Amy Grant)	Dominic Sena	
1987	"Big Mistake"	Dominic Sena	
1988	"I Wasn't the One (Who Said Goodbye)" (featuring Agnetha Fältskog) (only vocals)	—	
1988	"One Good Woman"	—	
1988	"Best of Times"	Jim Yukich	
1991		Jim Yukich	
1992	"Restless Heart"	Piers Plowden	
1993	"Feels Like Heaven" (featuring Chaka Khan)	Piers Plowden	
1995	"(I Wanna Take) Forever Tonight" (featuring Crystal Bernard)	Steven R. Monroe	
1997	"You're the Inspiration" (Peter Cetera featuring Az Yet)	Steven R. Monroe	

== Television appearances (solo career) ==
- 1987 – 29th Annual Grammy Awards, presenter, February 24, 1987
- 1987 – 59th Academy Awards, live performance
- 1992 – The Tonight Show With Jay Leno, December 15, 1992
- 1993 – American Music Awards, presenter, January 25, 1993
- 1993 – The Arsenio Hall Show, February 12, 1993
- 1993 – The Arsenio Hall Show, March 2, 1993
- 1996 – CBS This Morning, April 9, 1996
- 2003 – Concert for World Children's Day, PBS (recorded in 2002)
- 2003 – Soundstage, PBS
- 2004 – Macy's Thanksgiving Day Parade
- 2008 – Hitman: David Foster & Friends, November 11, 2008, PBS
- 2008 – Smucker's Presents Hot Ice, Cool Sounds, NBC
- 2010 – Tim and Eric Awesome Show, Great Job! – Greene Machine
- 2017 – Chicago: The Terry Kath Experience, November 7, 2017, AXS TV

== Awards and honors ==
=== As individual/solo artist ===
- 1984, Grammy Award, Best Vocal Arrangement for Two or More Voices, "Hard Habit to Break" (Track), Nominated
- 1984: ASCAP Pop Music Awards, ASCAP's Most Performed Songs, multiple songwriter winner, "Hard to Say I'm Sorry" and "Love Me Tomorrow", Won
- 1986: ASCAP Pop Music Awards, ASCAP's Most-Performed Songs, "You're the Inspiration", Won
- 1987: Grammy Award, Best Pop Vocal Performance by a Male Artist, "Glory of Love", Nominated
- 1987: Grammy Award, Best Pop Vocal Performance by a Duo or Group, "Next Time I Fall", Nominated
- 1987: Academy Award, Best Original Song, "Glory of Love", Nominated
- 1987: Golden Globe, Best Original Song, "Glory of Love", Nominated
- 1987: ASCAP Award, Most Performed Songs from Motion Pictures, "Glory of Love", Won
- 1987: American Video Award, Best New Artist, Won
- 1994: ASCAP Pop Music Awards, ASCAP's Most Performed Songs, "Restless Heart", Won
- 1997: Grammy Award, Best R&B Performance by a Duo or Group with Vocal, "Hard to Say I'm Sorry (Remix)" (Single), Nominated

=== As member of Chicago ===
(For a more complete list, see Chicago (band) § Awards and honors.)

- 1969, Grammy Award, Best New Artist of the Year, Chicago (Band), Nominated
- 1970: Grammy Award, Album of the Year, Chicago, Nominated
- 1970: Grammy Award, Best Contemporary Vocal Performance by a Duo, Group or Chorus, Chicago, Nominated
- 1976: Grammy Award, Best Pop Vocal Performance by a Duo, Group or Chorus, "If You Leave Me Now", Won
- 1976: Grammy Award, Record of the Year, "If You Leave Me Now" (Single), Nominated
- 1976: Grammy Award, Album of the Year, Chicago X, Nominated
- 1977: Madison Square Garden Gold Ticket Award
- 1977: American Music Award, Favorite Pop/Rock Band/Duo/Group, won
- 1982: Grammy Award, Best Pop Performance by a Duo or Group with Vocal, "Hard to Say I'm Sorry" (Single), Nominated
- 1984: Grammy Award, Record of the Year, "Hard Habit to Break" (Single), Nominated
- 1984: Grammy Award, Best Pop Performance by a Duo or Group with Vocal, "Hard Habit to Break" (Single) Nominated
- 1985, Grammy Award, Album of the Year, We Are the World – USA for Africa, Nominated
- 2014: Grammy Hall of Fame, Chicago Transit Authority, Inducted
- 2016: Rock and Roll Hall of Fame, Inducted
- 2017: Songwriters Hall of Fame, Elected (not inducted)
- 2020: Grammy Lifetime Achievement Award
