= One Good Woman =

Single by Peter Cetera

from the album One More Story
- B-side: "One More Story"
- Released: July 1988
- Length: 4:38
- Label: Full Moon; Warner Bros.
- Songwriters: Peter Cetera; Patrick Leonard
- Producers: Peter Cetera; Patrick Leonard

Peter Cetera singles chronology
"I Wasn't the One (Who Said Goodbye)" (1987)	"One Good Woman" (1988)	"You Never Listen to Me" (1988)

Music video
- "One Good Woman" on YouTube

Professional ratings
Review scores
Source	Rating
AllMusic	2/5 stars

"One Good Woman" is a song by Peter Cetera, formerly the lead singer of the rock band Chicago. Cetera co-wrote and co-produced the track with Patrick Leonard, and the song was included on Cetera's third studio album, One More Story (1988).

== Background ==
The song was originally written for the Tom Hanks film Big. Peter Cetera was shocked that the song was not chosen to be included in the soundtrack. In fact, Cetera later stated that the lyrics reflected the story line of the movie. Instead, it became the lead single from his One More Story album and reached No. 4 on the Billboard Hot 100 chart in October 1988. It also spent four weeks atop the Billboard adult contemporary chart.

== Personnel ==
- Peter Cetera – lead and backing vocals, bass guitar
- Patrick Leonard – acoustic piano, synthesizers
- Dann Huff – guitar
- John Robinson – drums

== Charts ==
Chart (1988)	Peak position
US Billboard Hot 100	4
US Billboard Adult Contemporary	1
Canada RPM Top Singles	1
UK Singles Chart	82

=== Year-end charts ===
Chart (1988)	Position
United States (Billboard)	69

== See also ==
- List of RPM number-one singles of 1988
- List of Hot Adult Contemporary number ones of 1988
