= River North Records =

Chicago-based records company

River North Records was a Chicago-based record company. It was a subsidiary of Platinum Entertainment.

== History ==
River North Records was created by Steve Devick in 1994. It was named and created after River North Studios, which was also created by Devick. The single, "I Want to Be Like Mike" (in reference to Michael Jordan) was recorded for River North in 1991, based on a very popular commercial jingle created by Devick for Gatorade.

The label also had a Nashville, Tennessee division specializing in country music, which opened in 1994. Billy Idol, David Bowie, Bon Jovi, and Dionne Warwick are some other artists that have recorded at River North Studios.

The label folded in 1998.

== Contracts ==
In 1993, River North Records signed a deal with vocalist Peter Cetera to record some of Cetera's albums. The label's first signee was Holly Dunn.

=== Former artists ===
- Atlanta Rhythm Section
- Steve Azar
- The Band
- The Beach Boys
- Crystal Bernard
- Peter Cetera
- Rob Crosby
- Steve Dahl
- Taylor Dayne
- Holly Dunn
- Kansas
- Steve Kolander
- Jim Messina
- Juice Newton
- Alan Parsons
- Player
- Ronna Reeves
- Jamie Warren
- Dionne Warwick

== Facility ==
River North Studios had a 1,400-square-foot (130 m^{2}) facility at 610 North Fairbanks Court in Chicago.
