= List of songs written by David Foster =

This is an alphabetical list of the songs known to have been written or co-written by David Foster.

Key
| † | Indicates single release |

Songs written by Foster, with original artists, co-writers and originating album, showing year released.
| Title | Artist(s) | Co-writer(s) | Originating album | Year | Ref. |
|---|---|---|---|---|---|
| "After the Love Has Gone" † | Earth, Wind & Fire | Jay Graydon; Bill Champlin | I Am | 1979 | |
| "After Tonight" | Mariah Carey | Mariah Carey; Diane Warren | Rainbow | 1999 | |
| "All I Do" | Yuna | Yunalis Zarain | Chapters | 2016 | |
| "All I Know of Love" | Barbra Streisand and Josh Groban | Linda Thompson | Duets | 2002 | |
| "All That My Heart Can Hold" | Wendy Moten | Linda Thompson; Jeremy Lubbock | Time for Change | 1995 | |
| "All'improvviso Amore" | Josh Groban | Paul Schwartz; Frank Musker; Kaballa | Closer | 2003 | |
| "America's Song" † | will.i.am (featuring David Foster, Bono, Mary J. Blige, Faith Hill and Seal | William Adams; George Pajon, Jr. | Change Is Now: Renewing America's Promise | 2009 | |
| "And Love Goes On" † | Earth, Wind & Fire | Larry Dunn; Brenda Russell; Verdine White; Maurice White | Faces | 1980 | |
| "And When She Danced" | Earth, Wind & Fire | Linda Thompson-Jenner | Stealing Home OST | 1988 | |
| "Aren't They All Our Children" | Various Artists | Linda Thompson | Non-album release | 2002 | |
| "At Last" | Kenny Loggins | Kenny Loggins | Vox Humana | 1985 | |
| "Ayer" † | Luis Miguel | Rudy Pérez; Jeremy Lubbock | Aries | 1993 | |
| "Bad Advice" | Chicago | Peter Cetera; James Pankow | Chicago 16 | 1982 | |
| "Be the Man" † | Celine Dion | Junior Miles | Let's Talk About Love | 1997 | |
| "Be the Man (Japanese version)" | Celine Dion | Junior Miles | Be the Man | 1997 | |
| "Because We Believe (Ama Credi E Vai)" † | Andrea Bocelli | Andrea Bocelli; Amy Foster | Amore | 2006 | |
| "The Best of Me" † | David Foster & Olivia Newton-John | Jeremy Lubbock; Richard Marx | David Foster | 1986 | |
| "Blue" | Seiko Matsuda | Matsumoto Takashi; Michael Landau; Tom Keane | Citron | 1988 | |
| "The Colour of My Love" | Celine Dion | Arthur Janov | The Colour of My Love | 1993 | |
| "Could It Be Right" | Earth, Wind & Fire | Maurice White; Allee Willis | Electric Universe | 1983 | |
| "Don't Let Me Walk This Road Alone" | BeBe & CeCe Winans | Keith Thomas; Linda Thompson | Relationships | 1994 | |
| "Dream With Me" | Jackie Evancho | Jackie Evancho; Linda Thompson | Dream With Me | 2011 | |
| "Every-Day Cider (林檎酒の日々)" | Seiko Matsuda | Matsumoto Takashi; Jeremy Lubbock | Citron | 1988 | |
| "Every Little Hurt" | Seiko Matsuda and David Foster | Randy Goodrum | Citron | 1988 | |
| "Everything You Are" | Tevin Campbell and Cheryl "Coko" Gamble | Warren Wiebe; Joey Diggs; Nita Whitaker; Suzette Charles; Will Wheaton, Jr. | Tevin Campbell | 1999 | |
| "Evolution Orange" | Earth, Wind & Fire | Nan O'Byrne; Maurice White | Raise! | 1981 | |
| "Finding Each Other" | Naoko Kawai and Steve Lukather | Tom Keane; Randy Goodrum; Steve Lukather | 9 1/2 Nine Half | 1985 | |
| "Follow Me" | Chicago | James Pankow | Chicago 16 | 1982 | |
| "Forever" † | Kenny Loggins | Kenny Loggins; Eva Ein | Vox Humana | 1985 | |
| "Freedom" | David Foster | —N/a | River of Love | 1990 | |
| "From the Inside" | Alice Cooper | Alice Cooper; Bernie Taupin; Dick Wagner | From The Inside | 1978 | |
| "Georgetown" | David Foster | —N/a | St. Elmo's Fire OST | 1985 | |
| "Girls Know How" | Al Jarreau | Burt Bacharach; Carole Bayer Sager | Night Shift OST | 1982 | |
| "Glory of Love" † | Peter Cetera | Peter Cetera; Diane Nini | Solitude/Solitaire | 1986 | |
| "Goodbye" † | Air Supply | Linda Thompson | The Vanishing Race | 1993 | |
| "Got to Be Real" † | Cheryl Lynn | Cheryl Lynn; David Paich | Cheryl Lynn | 1978 | |
| "Grown-Up Christmas List" | Natalie Cole | Linda Thompson; Amy Grant | River of Love | 1990 | |
| "Hard to Say I'm Sorry" † | Chicago | Peter Cetera | Chicago 16 | 1982 | |
| "Heart Strings (Love Will Show Us How)" | David Foster / Glenn Jones | Burt Bacharach; Michael Jay Margules | The Best of Me / Take It from Me | 1983 / 1986 | |
| "Hold Me... (抱いて…)" | Seiko Matsuda / Kim Carnes | Matsumoto Takashi | Citron / Seiko Ballads - Sweet Memories | 1988 / 1991 | |
| "Hold Me 'Til The Mornin' Comes" † | Paul Anka and Peter Cetera | Paul Anka | Walk a Fine Line / A Body of Work | 1983 / 1998 | |
| "How Many Times" | Jordan Hill | Greg Charley; John Winston | Jordan Hill | 1995 | |
| "I Believe in Love" | Sally Yeh and James Ingram | James Ingram; Linda Thompson | Classic Duets (合唱金曲经典) | 1994 | |
| "I Burn for You" | Danny Peck and Nancy Shanks | Chris McDaniels; Holly Knight | The Secret of My Success OST | 1987 | |
| "I Can Wait Forever" † | Air Supply | Jay Graydon; Graham Russell | Ghostbusters OST | 1984 | |
| "I Have Nothing" † | Whitney Houston | Linda Thompson | The Bodyguard OST | 1992 | |
| "I Hear Your Voice" † | Lionel Richie | Lionel Richie; Diane Warren | Time | 1998 | |
| "I'll Be There" | Kenny Loggins | Kenny Loggins; Nathan East; El Debarge | Vox Humana | 1985 | |
| "If I Turn You Away" | Vikki Moss | Richard Marx | St. Elmo's Fire OST | 1985 | |
| "In the Stone" † | Earth, Wind & Fire | Maurice White; Allee Willis | I Am | 1979 | |
| "In This Song" | Charice | Claude Kelly; Emanuel Kiriakou | Charice | 2010 | |
| "Inside You" | David Foster (featuring Hamish Stuart) | Tom Keane; Will Jennings | River of Love | 1990 | |
| "Is There A Chance" | David Foster (featuring Warren Wiebe) | Brian Wilson; Linda Thompson | River of Love | 1990 | |
| "It's Alright" | Chicago | Bill Champlin | Chicago 18 | 1986 | |
| "It's the Falling in Love" | Michael Jackson | Carole Bayer Sager | Off the Wall | 1979 | |
| "Lady of My Heart" | Jack Wagner | Glen Ballard; Jay Graydon | All I Need | 1984 | |
| "Listen to Me" | Warren Wiebe and Celine Dion | Linda Thompson; Will Jennings | Unreleased song from Listen to Me | 1989 | |
| "Learn to Love Again" | Lou Rawls | Jay Graydon; Richard Page | Love All Your Blues Away | 1986 | |
| "Let Your Feelings Show" | Earth, Wind & Fire | Maurice White; Allee Willis | I Am | 1979 | |
| "Living for the Moment" | David Foster (featuring Warren Wiebe) | Jorge Calandrelli; Linda Thompson | River of Love | 1990 | |
| "Lonely Won't Leave Me Alone" | Jermaine Jackson | Tom Keane; Kathy Wakefield; Jermaine Jackson | Precious Moments | 1986 | |
| "Look What You've Done to Me" † | Boz Scaggs | Boz Scaggs | Urban Cowboy | 1980 | |
| "Loraine" | Kenny Loggins | Kenny Loggins | Vox Humana | 1985 | |
| "Love at Second Sight" | David Foster and Vikki Moss / Dionne Warwick | Paul Gordon | The Best of Me / Friends | 1983 / 1985 | |
| "Love by Another Name" | Celine Dion | Clif Magness; Glen Ballard | Unison | 1990 | |
| "Love Lights the World" | David Foster (featuring Peabo Bryson, Celine Dion and Color Me Badd) | Linda Thompson | Love Lights the World | 1994 | |
| "Love Me Tomorrow" † | Chicago | Peter Cetera | Chicago 16 | 1982 | |
| "Love Theme from St. Elmo's Fire (For Just A Moment)" | David Foster (featuring Amy Holland and Donny Gerrard) | Cynthia Weil | St. Elmo's Fire OST | 1985 | |
| "Love Theme from St. Elmo's Fire (Instrumental)" † | David Foster | —N/a | St. Elmo's Fire OST | 1985 | |
| "Marrakech" | Seiko Matsuda | Matsumoto Takashi; Steve Kipner; Paul Bliss | Citron | 1988 | |
| "Miss Independent" | Ne-Yo | —N/a | Year of Gentlemen | 2008 | |
| "The Minute I Saw You" | John Parr | John Parr; Carole Bayer Sager; Marvin Hamlisch | Unreleased song from Three Men and a Baby | 1987 | |
| "Mornin'" † | Al Jarreau | Jay Graydon; Al Jarreau | Jarreau | 1983 | |
| "My One True Friend" † | Bette Midler | Carole King; Carole Bayer Sager | Bathhouse Betty | 1998 | |
| "My Sweet Delight" | Jennifer Holliday | Tony Haynes; Maurice White | Feel My Soul | 1983 | |
| "Never Should Have Let You Go" | Jordan Hill | Greg Charley; John Winston | Jordan Hill | 1995 | |
| "No. 1" | Seiko Matsuda (featuring The Nylons) | Matsumoto Takashi; Paul Cooper | Citron | 1988 | |
| "Oh Yeah" † | Bill Withers | Bill Withers; Larry Carlton | Watching You, Watching Me | 1985 | |
| "One More Chance" † | Madonna | Madonna | Something to Remember | 1995 | |
| "Only You" | Chicago | James Pankow | Chicago 17 | 1984 | |
| "Please Hold On" | Chicago | Bill Champlin; Lionel Richie | Chicago 17 | 1984 | |
| "The Power of the Dream" | Celine Dion | Babyface; Linda Thompson | It's All Coming Back To Me Now | 1996 | |
| "The Prayer" | Celine Dion | Carole Bayer Sager; Alberto Testa; Tony Renis | Quest for Camelot OST | 1998 | |
| "The Prayer" † | Celine Dion and Andrea Bocelli | Carole Bayer Sager; Alberto Testa; Tony Renis | Quest for Camelot OST | 1998 | |
| "Promise Me" | Eden's Crush | Linda Thompson | Popstars | 2001 | |
| "Red Sweet Peas, Pt. 2 (続・赤いスイートピー)" | Seiko Matsuda | Matsumoto Takashi; Linda Thompson; Steve Kipner | Citron | 1988 | |
| "Remember Me This Way" | Jordan Hill | Linda Thompson-Jenner | Jordan Hill | 1995 | |
| "Rescue You" | Chicago | Peter Cetera | Chicago 16 | 1982 | |
| "River of Love" | David Foster (featuring Bryan Adams, Hamish Stuart and Warren Wiebe) | George B. Thatcher; Rick G. Hahn | River of Love | 1990 | |
| "Rock That!" | Earth, Wind & Fire | Maurice White | I Am | 1979 | |
| "Save Me" | Peter Cetera | Peter Cetera | One More Story | 1988 | |
| "Saved My Life" | Fee Waybill | Fee Waybill; Steve Lukather | St. Elmo's Fire OST | 1985 | |
| "The Secret of My Success" † | Night Ranger | Michael Landau; Jack Blades; Tom Keane | The Secret of My Success OST | 1987 | |
| "She's a Beauty" † | The Tubes | Steve Lukather; Fee Waybill | Outside Inside | 1983 | |
| "Shining Through" † | Miki Howard | Linda Thompson; Michael Kamen | Femme Fatale | 1992 | |
| "Slip Away" | Jordan Hill | Greg Charley; John Winston | Jordan Hill | 1995 | |
| "So In Love With You" † | U.N.V. | Linda Thompson; William Ross | Universal Nubian Voices | 1995 | |
| "Spirit of a New World" | Earth, Wind & Fire | Brian Fairweather; Martin Page; Maurice White | Electric Universe | 1983 | |
| "St. Elmo's Fire (Man in Motion)" † | John Parr | John Parr | St. Elmo's Fire OST | 1985 | |
| "Stand Up for Love" † | Destiny's Child | Amy Foster-Gillies | #1's | 2005 | |
| "Stay the Night" † | Chicago | Peter Cetera | Chicago 17 | 1984 | |
| "Stop Me from Starting This Feeling" | Lou Rawls | Tom Keane; Alan Thicke | Love All Your Blues Away | 1986 | |
| "Stressed Out (Close To The Edge)" | Airplay | Jay Graydon; Stephen A. Kipner; Peter Beckett | St. Elmo's Fire OST | 1985 | |
| "Tears Are Not Enough" † | Northern Lights | Bryan Adams; Jim Vallance; Rachel Paiement; Paul Hyde; Bob Rock | We Are The World | 1985 | |
| "Tell Him" † | Celine Dion | Linda Thompson; Walter Afanasieff | Let's Talk About Love | 1997 | |
| "There for Me" | Mariah Carey | Mariah Carey; Diane Warren | B-side to "Never Too Far/Hero Medley" single | 2001 | |
| "This Must Be Love" | David Foster (featuring Jeff Pescetto and Warren Wiebe) | Lamont Dozier | River of Love | 1990 | |
| "This Time It Was Really Right" | Jon Anderson | Jon Anderson | St. Elmo's Fire OST | 1985 | |
| "Through the Fire" † | Chaka Khan | Tom Keane; Cynthia Weil | I Feel for You | 1985 | |
| "To Love You More" † | Celine Dion | Junior Miles | The Colour of My Love | 1993 | |
| "Too Young" † | Jack Wagner | Jay Graydon; Steve Kipner; Donny Osmond | Lighting Up the Night | 1985 | |
| "Until the End of Time" | Jordan Hill and Delious Kennedy | Brian McKnight | Jordan Hill | 1995 | |
| "Voices That Care" † | Various Artists | Linda Thompson; Peter Cetera | Non-album single | 1991 | |
| "Wait" | Earth, Wind & Fire | Maurice White; Allee Willis | I Am | 1979 | |
| "Waiting for You to Decide" | Chicago | Steve Lukather; David Paich | Chicago 16 | 1982 | |
| "We Never Called It Love" | Karyn White and Pauli Carman | Tom Keane; Michael Himelstein | It's Time | 1987 | |
| "We Never Get to It" | Seiko Matsuda | Rhett Lawrence; Linda Thompson | Citron | 1988 | |
| "What Can I Say" | Chicago | James Pankow | Chicago 16 | 1982 | |
| "Whatever We Imagine" | James Ingram | Paul Gordon; Jeremy Lubbock | It's Your Night | 1983 | |
| "When Love Comes Calling" | Deniece Williams | Carole Pinckes; Deniece Williams | When Love Comes Calling | 1979 | |
| "Where Do We Go from Here?" † | Vanessa Williams | Douglas Pashley; Linda Thompson | Greatest Hits: The First Ten Years | 1998 | |
| "Who's Gonna Love You Tonight" | David Foster | Keith Diamond; John Bettis | David Foster | 1986 | |
| "Why Can't We Fall In Love?" | Deniece Williams | Carole Bayer-Sager; Deniece Williams | When Love Comes Calling | 1979 | |
| "Wind Traveler in April (四月は風の旅人)" | Seiko Matsuda | Matsumoto Takashi; John W. Dexter | Citron | 1988 | |
| "Without You" | Samantha Cole | Samantha Cole; Richard Marx | Samantha Cole | 1997 | |
| "Will You Still Love Me?" † | Chicago | Tom Keane; Richard Baskin | Chicago 18 | 1986 | |
| "You" | Earth, Wind & Fire | Brenda Russell; Maurice White | Faces | 1980 | |
| "You and I" | Earth, Wind & Fire | Maurice White; Allee Willis | I Am | 1979 | |
| "You Can Never Ask Too Much (of Love)" | Take 6 | Linda Thompson; Cedric Dent | Join the Band | 1994 | |
| "You Can't Find Me" | Seiko Matsuda | Matsumoto Takashi; Jay Graydon | Citron | 1988 | |
| "You'll See" † | Madonna | Madonna | Something to Remember | 1995 | |
| "You're the Inspiration" † | Chicago | Peter Cetera | Chicago 17 | 1984 | |

== Bibliography ==
- Shapiro, Marc (2001). Mariah Carey: The Unauthorized Biography. ECW Press. ISBN 978-1-55022-444-3.
