= The Heart of Chicago 1967–1997 =

The Heart of Chicago 1967-1997

Greatest hits album by Chicago
- Released: April 22, 1997
- Recorded: 1969–1997
- Genre: Rock
- Length: 66:59
- Label: Reprise
- Producers: James William Guercio, David Foster, Ron Nevison, Lenny Kravitz and James Newton Howard

Chicago chronology
Night & Day: Big Band (1995)	The Heart of Chicago 1967-1997 (1997)	The Heart of Chicago 1967–1998 Volume II (1998)

Singles from The Heart of Chicago 1967–1997
- 1. "Here in My Heart" Released: March 1997; 2. "The Only One" Released: October 1997

Professional ratings
Review scores
Source	Rating
AllMusic	3/5 stars

The Heart of Chicago 1967–1997 is the fourth greatest hits album, and twenty-third album overall, by the American band Chicago, released in 1997. It was compiled to commemorate the group's 30th anniversary of their formation.

The idea was to bridge their two eras on one CD: the James William Guercio and Columbia Records period of the 1970s, and the David Foster and Warner Bros. Records period of the 1980s. In addition, the band added two new songs, "The Only One" produced by Lenny Kravitz and "Here in My Heart" by James Newton Howard. Both of these new tracks were successful in the adult contemporary market; "Here in My Heart" topped the AC charts, and "The Only One" was a top 20 AC hit.

The album was certified gold following its April 1997 release. A second album, The Heart of Chicago 1967–1998 Volume II, was released the following year.

== Track listing ==
1. "You're the Inspiration" (Peter Cetera/David Foster) – 3:49 from Chicago 17
2. "If You Leave Me Now" (Cetera) – 3:55 from Chicago X
3. "Make Me Smile" (Single version) (James Pankow) – 2:59 from Chicago II
4. "Hard Habit to Break" (Steve Kipner/Jon Parker) – 4:44 from Chicago 17
5. "Saturday in the Park" (Robert Lamm) – 3:55 from Chicago V
6. "Wishing You Were Here" (Cetera) – 4:35 from Chicago VII
7. "The Only One" (Pankow/Greg O'Connor) – 5:59 Previously unreleased
  - A new recording produced and featuring backing vocals by Lenny Kravitz
8. "Colour My World" (Pankow) – 2:59 from Chicago II
9. "Look Away" (Diane Warren) – 4:00 from Chicago 19
10. "Here in My Heart" (Glen Ballard/James Newton Howard) – 4:15 Previously unreleased
  - A new recording produced by James Newton Howard
11. "Just You 'n' Me" (Pankow) – 3:42 from Chicago VI
12. "Does Anybody Really Know What Time It Is?" (Single version) (Lamm) – 3:19 from Chicago Transit Authority
13. "Will You Still Love Me?" (Foster/Tom Keane/Richard Baskin) – 5:41 from Chicago 18
14. "Beginnings" (Lamm) – 7:54 from Chicago Transit Authority
15. "Hard to Say I'm Sorry/Get Away" (Cetera/Foster/Lamm) – 5:05 from Chicago 16

== Charts ==
Chart (1997–1999)	Peak position
Canada Top Albums/CDs (RPM)	47
Belgian Albums (Ultratop Flanders)	39
Japanese Albums (Oricon)	63
New Zealand Albums (RMNZ)	41
Scottish Albums (Official Charts)	29
UK Albums (Official Charts)	21
US Billboard 200	55

== Certifications ==
Region	Certification	Certified units/sales
Australia (ARIA)	Gold	35,000^{^}
United Kingdom (BPI) 2008 release	Gold	100,000^{*}
United States (RIAA)	Gold	500,000^{^}
^{*} Sales figures based on certification alone.^{^} Shipments figures based on certification alone.
