= The Heart of Chicago 1967–1998 Volume II =

Greatest hits album by Chicago
- Released: May 12, 1998
- Recorded: 1969–1998
- Genre: Rock
- Length: 71:56
- Label: Reprise
- Producer: James William Guercio, David Foster, Ron Nevison, Roy Bittan, Phil Ramone, Chicago and Chas Sandford

Chicago chronology
The Heart of Chicago 1967–1997 (1997)	The Heart of Chicago 1967–1998 Volume II (1998)	Chicago XXV: The Christmas Album (1998)

Singles from The Heart of Chicago 1967–1998 Volume II
- 1. "All Roads Lead to You" Released: April 1998

Professional ratings
Review scores
Source	Rating
AllMusic	3/5 stars

The Heart of Chicago 1967–1998 Volume II is the fifth greatest hits album, and twenty-fourth album overall, by American rock band Chicago, released in 1998. As the sequel to 1997's The Heart of Chicago 1967–1997, this edition also features a mixture of songs from Chicago's entire 30-year career to date.

As with the first edition, The Heart of Chicago 1967–1998 Volume II contains two new songs. "All Roads Lead to You" and "Show Me a Sign" were both produced by Roy Bittan of Bruce Springsteen's E Street Band.

Released in May 1998, The Heart of Chicago 1967–1998 Volume II was not as successful as its predecessor, peaking only at #154 in the US. Both editions of The Heart of Chicago are comparable to Rhino Records' 2002 two-CD package The Very Best of Chicago: Only the Beginning.

== Reception ==
The Heart of Chicago 1967–1998 Volume II (Reprise 46911) reached No. 154 in the US albums chart during a chart stay of 2 weeks.

== Track listing ==
1. "Dialogue (Part I & II)" (Robert Lamm) – 7:10 from Chicago V
2. "Old Days" (James Pankow) – 3:30 from Chicago VIII
3. "All Roads Lead to You" (Marc Beeson/Desmond Child) – 4:20 Previously unreleased
4. "Love Me Tomorrow" (Peter Cetera/David Foster) – 4:59 from Chicago 16
5. "Baby, What a Big Surprise" (Cetera) – 3:06 from Chicago XI
6. "You're Not Alone" (Jim Scott) – 3:57 from Chicago 19
7. "What Kind of Man Would I Be?" (Jason Scheff/Chas Sandford/Bobby Caldwell) – 4:19 from Chicago 19
8. "No Tell Lover" (Cetera/Lee Loughnane/Danny Seraphine) – 3:49 from Hot Streets (This version is slightly different than the album version)
9. "Show Me a Sign" (Pankow/Greg O'Connor) – 3:37 Previously unreleased
10. "(I've Been) Searchin' So Long" (Pankow) – 4:29 from Chicago VII
11. "Call on Me" (Lee Loughnane) – 4:02 from Chicago VII
12. "I Don't Wanna Live Without Your Love" (Diane Warren/Albert Hammond) – 3:57 from Chicago 19
13. "Feelin' Stronger Every Day" (Cetera/Pankow) – 4:13 from Chicago VI
14. "Stay the Night" (Cetera/Foster) – 3:46 from Chicago 17
15. "I'm a Man" (Jimmy Miller/Steve Winwood) – 7:39 from Chicago Transit Authority
16. "25 or 6 to 4" (Lamm) – 4:50 from Chicago II

== Charts ==
Chart (1998)	Peak position
US Billboard 200	154
