= Chicago & Earth, Wind & Fire – Live at the Greek Theatre =

Chicago / Earth, Wind & Fire - Live at the Greek Theatre

Video by Chicago and Earth, Wind & Fire
- Released: June 28, 2005
- Recorded: August 2004
- Genre: Jazz; R&B; soul; pop rock
- Length: 173 minutes
- Label: Image Entertainment

Chicago & Earth, Wind & Fire – Live at the Greek Theatre is a live concert DVD by American bands Chicago and Earth, Wind & Fire. The recording was made from two appearances at the Greek Theatre in Los Angeles, California at the end of their joint tour in 2004. The DVD was certified platinum just two months after its 2005 release.

== Production ==
Billboard writer Christopher Walsh gives the following details about the video production: The video was shot in high-resolution audio and high-definition video. Design FX Remote Recording handled audio for the show, which required 110 inputs. Vista, California-based remote recording studio, Le Mobile also provided a truck. According to engineer Mike Frondelli, audio was recorded on Pro Tools HD at 24 bit/48 kHz and HD video was captured on ten cameras at 1080i. Design FX mixer/director Scott Peets said audio recording also benefitted from the truck's API console and classic UREI, Teletronix and dbx compressors. The backup format for the video was a Sony 3348 tape machine.

== Track listing ==
=== Disc 1 ===
==== Opening - both bands ====
- "Beginnings"
- "In the Stone"
- "Dialogue (Part I & II)"

==== Earth, Wind & Fire ====
- "Magic Mind"
- "Boogie Wonderland"
- "System of Survival"
- "Jupiter"
- "Getaway"
- "Serpentine Fire"
- "Kalimba Story"
- "Got to Get You into My Life"
- "The Way You Move"
- "After the Love Has Gone" (feat. Bill Champlin of Chicago, original co-writer of the song)
- "That's the Way of the World"
- "Reasons"
- "Fantasy"
- "Let's Groove"
- "Mighty Mighty"

=== Disc 2 ===
==== Chicago ====
- "Make Me Smile Medley" ("Ballet for a Girl in Buchannon")
  - "Make Me Smile"
  - "So Much to Say, So Much to Give"
  - "Anxiety's Moment"
  - "West Virginia Fantasies"
  - "Colour My World"
  - "To Be Free"
  - "Now More Than Ever"
- "If You Leave Me Now"
- "Call on Me"
- "Alive Again"
- "Hard Habit to Break"
- "Mongonucleosis"
- "Old Days"
- "Just You 'n' Me"
- "Saturday in the Park"
- "Feelin' Stronger Every Day"
- "I'm a Man"
- "Hard to Say I'm Sorry/Get Away"

==== Finale - both bands ====
- "September"
- "Free"
- "Sing a Song"
- "Does Anybody Really Know What Time It Is?"
- "Shining Star"
- "25 or 6 to 4"
