= Chicago XXVI: Live in Concert =

Live album by Chicago
- Released: October 12, 1999
- Recorded: July 1999
- Genre: Rock; adult contemporary
- Length: 72:02
- Label: Chicago Records
- Producer: Live tracks: n/a Studio tracks: Roy Bittan and Mervyn Warren

Chicago chronology
| Chicago XXV: The Christmas Album (1998) | Chicago XXVI: Live in Concert (1999) | The Very Best of Chicago: Only the Beginning (2002) |

Chicago XXVI: Live in Concert is a live album by the American band Chicago, their twenty-sixth album overall, released in 1999. Their second live album to be released in the US, it was Chicago's first of the sort since 1971's Chicago at Carnegie Hall and 1972's Live in Japan, though the band had released commercial VHS tapes of two concerts in the early 1990s.

Released on their own Chicago Records imprint, and featuring the band's latter day line-up, Chicago XXVI: Live in Concert is composed mostly of their wealth of hits. Three brand new studio recordings end the album, one of which, Jackie Wilson's "(Your Love Keeps Lifting Me) Higher and Higher", features non-band member Michael McDonald on lead vocals.

== Reception ==
Professional ratings
Review scores
| Source | Rating |
|---|---|
| AllMusic | 3/5 stars |

In a retrospective review, Allmusic described Chicago XXVI: Live in Concert as a solid return to form after Chicago's early 1990s decline, particularly praising the renditions of songs from the band's early years and the omission of their late 1980s material. However, they criticized the three studio tracks which end the album.

== Track listing ==
1. "Ballet for a Girl in Buchannon" (James Pankow) – 13:29
  - "Make Me Smile"
  - "So Much to Say, So Much to Give"
  - "Anxiety's Moment
  - "West Virginia Fantasies"
  - "Colour My World"
  - "To Be Free"
  - "Now More Than Ever"
2. "(I've Been) Searchin' So Long" (Pankow) – 4:40
3. "Mongonucleosis" (Pankow) – 3:39
4. "Hard Habit to Break" (Steve Kipner, Jon Parker) – 5:16
5. "Call on Me" (Lee Loughnane) – 4:33
6. "Feelin' Stronger Every Day" (Peter Cetera, Pankow) – 4:24
7. "Just You 'n' Me" (Pankow) – 6:18
8. "Beginnings" (Robert Lamm) – 5:51
9. "Hard to Say I'm Sorry/Get Away" (Cetera, David Foster, Lamm) – 5:38
10. "25 or 6 to 4" (Lamm) – 5:51
11. "Back to You" (Lamm, Keith Howland) – 3:41
12. "If I Should Ever Lose You" (Burt Bacharach, Tonio K) – 4:30
13. "(Your Love Keeps Lifting Me) Higher and Higher" (Gary Jackson, Raynard Miner, Carl Smith) – 4:11
  - Features Michael McDonald on lead vocal
  - Tracks 11, 12, and 13 are new studio recordings

Chicago XXVI: Live in Concert (Chicago 26) did not chart in the US or UK.

== Personnel ==
Chicago

- Bill Champlin – keyboards, guitars, lead and backing vocals
- Keith Howland – acoustic guitar, electric guitar, backing vocals
- Tris Imboden – drums, percussion
- Robert Lamm – keyboards, acoustic guitar, percussion, lead and backing vocals
- Lee Loughnane – trumpet, flugelhorn, percussion, backing vocals
- James Pankow – trombone, percussion, backing vocals
- Walter Parazaider – saxophones, flute, clarinet, backing vocals
- Jason Scheff – bass, lead and backing vocals

== Production ==
- Roy Bittan – producer (11)
- Mervyn Warren – producer (12, 13)
- Roger Gibbons – engineer
- Ted Perlman – engineer
- Ed Thacker – engineer, mixing (1–10)
- Humberto Gatica – mixing (11, 12, 13)
- Carlos Garcia – additional engineer
- Chris Blazier – production coordinator
- John Kosh – art direction, design

Crew

- Steve Brumbach – tour manager
- Tony Blanc – sound engineer
- Ken Parkin – sound monitor
- Russ Achzet – keyboard technician
- Hank Steiger – guitar technician
- Mike Bessinger – drum technician
- Tony Leo – horn technician
- Howard Kaufman – management
- Peter Schivarelli – management
