= The heart of Chicago =

The heart of Chicago may refer to:

- The Heart of Chicago 1967–1997, the fifth greatest hits album by the American band Chicago
- The Heart of Chicago 1967–1998 Volume II, the sixth greatest hits album by Chicago
- The Heart of... Chicago, an alternate name for the third greatest hits album by Chicago
