= All Roads Lead to You (disambiguation) =

"All Roads Lead to You" is a 1981 song by Steve Wariner.

All Roads Lead to You may also refer to:

- "All Roads Lead to You" (Chicago song), a 1998 song by Chicago
- "All Roads Lead to You", a 1989 song by Red Flag
