= Chicago 8 =

Chicago 8 may refer to:

- The original name for the Chicago Seven
- The Chicago 8, a 2012 movie about the Chicago Eight (Chicago Seven) group
- Chicago VIII, a 1975 album by American rock band Chicago
