= Niagara Falls (Chicago song) =

Single by Chicago

from the album Chicago 18
- B-side: "I Believe"
- Released: June 1987
- Genre: Rock
- Length: 3:43
- Label: Full Moon; Warner Bros.
- Songwriters: Steve Kipner; Bobby Caldwell
- Producer: David Foster

Chicago singles chronology
"If She Would Have Been Faithful..." (1987)	"Niagara Falls" (1987)	"I Don't Wanna Live Without Your Love" (1988)

"Niagara Falls" is the fourth single released by the American rock band, Chicago, from their 1986 album, Chicago 18. Lead vocals were shared by Jason Scheff and Bill Champlin.

Following the successful singles, "Will You Still Love Me?" (No. 3 US pop) and "If She Would Have Been Faithful..." (No. 17 US pop), "Niagara Falls" only reached No. 91 on the Billboard Hot 100 pop singles chart.

== Video ==
Like the majority of Chicago's music videos from the late 1980s, the video for "Niagara Falls" featured various people shown throughout, with the main storyline revolving around a couple trying to make things work. The band itself never appears.

== Charts ==
Chart (1987)	Peak position
US Billboard Hot 100	91
