= Brand New Love Affair (song) =

Single by Chicago

from the album Chicago VIII
- B-side: "Hideaway"
- Released: August 27, 1975
- Recorded: 1974
- Genre: Rock
- Length: 4:35
- Label: Columbia
- Songwriter: James Pankow

Chicago singles chronology
"Old Days" (1975)	"Brand New Love Affair" (1975)	"Another Rainy Day in New York City" (1976)

"Brand New Love Affair" sometimes alternatively listed as "Brand New Love Affair (Parts I and II)", is a song written by James Pankow for the group Chicago and recorded for their album Chicago VIII. The song was the third single released from the album and peaked at No. 61 on the US Billboard Hot 100 and No. 43 on the US Cash Box Top 100. The single edit was truncated from the album version and features a fade into the second section.

Guitarist Terry Kath sings the first half while bassist Peter Cetera sings the second half. Keyboardist Robert Lamm played the distinctive Fender Rhodes electric piano on the song.

== Critical reception ==
Billboard characterized "Brand New Love Affair" as a "slow moody ballad" that "picks up strongly about half way through". They felt that the song's "ballad format here is an effective change for the group". Cash Box said that the song "sounds like a brand new standard" with a "Ray Charles style painful/mature/emotional vocal." Record World also noted the Ray Charles influence and called it a "brand new direction for the band, as stunning as it is adventurous."

== Personnel ==
Part One

- Terry Kath – lead vocals, electric guitars
- Robert Lamm – backing vocals, Fender Rhodes electric piano, Hammond organ
- Peter Cetera – backing vocals, bass
- Danny Seraphine – drums
- Laudir de Oliveira – wind chimes
- James Pankow – trombone
- Lee Loughnane – trumpet
- Walter Parazaider – alto saxophone

Part Two

- Peter Cetera – lead vocals, bass
- Terry Kath – backing vocals, electric guitars (special effects: fuzzbox and wah-wah pedal)
- Robert Lamm – backing vocals, Fender Rhodes electric piano, piano
- Danny Seraphine – drums
- Laudir de Oliveira – tambourine, temple blocks, congas
- James Pankow – trombone
- Lee Loughnane – trumpet
- Walter Parazaider – alto saxophone

Patrick Williams provided the orchestration on both parts of the song
