= Along Comes a Woman =

Single by Chicago

from the album Chicago 17
- B-side: "We Can Stop the Hurtin'"
- Released: February 11, 1985
- Genre: Pop rock
- Length: 4:14 (album version); 3:47 (single version)
- Label: Full Moon; Warner Bros.
- Songwriters: Peter Cetera; Mark Goldenberg
- Producer: David Foster

Chicago singles chronology
"You're the Inspiration" (1984)	"Along Comes a Woman" (1985)	"25 or 6 to 4" (1986)

"Along Comes a Woman" is a song written by Peter Cetera and Mark Goldenberg for the group Chicago and recorded for their album Chicago 17 (1984), with Cetera singing lead vocals. The fourth single released from that album, it is the last Chicago single released with original singer/bassist Cetera, who left the band in the summer of 1985.

The original album version was 4:14 in length. It was edited down to a length of 3:47 for the single version.

== Critical reception ==
Upon its release in 1985, Billboard magazine highlighted the single in its "Singles: Pop: Picks" section, as a "new release with the greatest chart potential," and called it a "hard rocker." Cashbox felt that the song was "a dynamic and melodic" song that was "harder-edged than Chicago's most recent cuts". At the end of the year, Billboard magazine music critic, Linda Moleski, listed the single among her top ten highlights of the year as, "An excellent funk-pop sound that’s reflective of 1985."

== Music video ==
The music video, shot in black and white, combined themes from the films Raiders of the Lost Ark and Casablanca and featured Peter Cetera, the lead vocalist on the song, in the Indiana Jones/Rick Blaine-type role. It was produced by Jon Small of Picture Vision, Inc., and was directed by Jay Dubin, who also directed the syndicated TV series The Wombles in the 1980s. The video was released in 1985, during what some call the "golden era" of MTV.

== Charts ==
Chart (1985)	Peak position
Canada Top Singles (RPM)	17
UK Singles (Official Charts)	96
US Billboard Hot 100	14
US Adult Contemporary (Billboard)	25
US Mainstream Rock (Billboard)	10
