= Harry Truman (song) =

Single by Chicago

from the album Chicago VIII
- B-side: "Till We Meet Again"
- Released: February 1975
- Recorded: 1974
- Genre: Pop rock
- Length: 3:01
- Label: Columbia
- Songwriter: Robert Lamm
- Producer: James William Guercio

Chicago singles chronology
"Wishing You Were Here" (1974)	"Harry Truman" (1975)	"Old Days" (1975)

"Harry Truman" is a song written by Robert Lamm for the group Chicago and recorded for their album Chicago VIII (1975), with lead vocals by Lamm. The first single released from that album, it reached number 13 on the U.S. Billboard Hot 100. It also reached number 23 on the Adult Contemporary chart. In Canada, the song peaked at number 16.

Written after the resignation of U.S. President Richard Nixon, the lyrics are a tribute to a former President that Lamm felt the American people could trust — straight-talking Harry S. Truman. "America needs you, Harry Truman". Lamm wrote the song after reading Merle Miller's book Plain Speaking, as well as Truman's memoirs.

Despite its popularity at the time, "Harry Truman" only appears on three of Chicago's compilation albums: Group Portrait (now out of print) and The Box, plus the Canada-only "Overtime" released in 1995. It is rarely performed in the band's live shows.

This song was "performed" by Chicago in late 1974 as part of the 1975 Dick Clark's New Year's Rockin' Eve special, in which Chicago guitarist Terry Kath can be seen mocking the band's lip-syncing by holding cue cards depicting the song's lyrics.

== Critical reception ==
Cash Box said that it "starts out sounding like a Randy Newman song and evolves into a Beatlesque romp." Record World called it a "nostalgic search for the elements of true heroics." Billboard called the song "a strange one" that resembled the work of Randy Newman, adding that Chicago did an effective job in doing so. The publication also felt that the "fun aspects of the song keep it from getting too political."

== Personnel ==
- Robert Lamm – lead vocals, piano
- Terry Kath – guitar, backing vocals
- Peter Cetera – bass, backing vocals
- Danny Seraphine – drums
- Laudir de Oliveira – percussion
- Jimmy Pankow – trombone
- Lee Loughnane – trumpet
- Walter Parazaider – tenor saxophone, clarinet
- Caribou Kitchenettes – backing vocals

The "Caribou Kitchenettes" were Loughnane, de Oliveira, Pankow, Parazaider, Joanne Roccone, Brandy Maitland, Katherine Ogden, Kristy Ferguson, Linda Greene, Donna Conroy, Bob Eberhardt, John Carsello, Steve Fagin, and Richard Torres.
