= Goodbye (Air Supply song) =

1993 single by Air Supply

Single by Air Supply

from the album The Vanishing Race
- B-side: "The Vanishing Race"
- Released: May 7, 1993
- Studio: Trax Recorders, Ground Control Studios/Sunset Sound Studios (Los Angeles, California)
- Length: 4:04
- Label: Giant
- Songwriters: David Foster; Linda Thompson
- Producers: Humberto Gatica; Graham Russell

Air Supply singles chronology
"Stronger Than the Night" (1991)	"Goodbye" (1993)	"Someone" (1995)

"Goodbye" is a song by English/Australian soft rock duo Air Supply, from their twelfth album, The Vanishing Race (1993). Released as a single in 1993, it was an US Adult Contemporary chart hit, peaking at No. 48. In the UK, the song peaked at No. 66, their third highest charting single there, after "All Out of Love" (#11) and "Even the Nights Are Better" (#44). The song was more successful in Asia, particularly in the Philippines and Indonesia.

== Charts ==
Chart (1993)	Peak position
Panama (UPI)	5
Peru (UPI)	6
UK Singles (OCC)	66
US Adult Contemporary (Billboard)	48

== Cover versions ==
"Goodbye" has been covered by several artists:

- Padhyangan, 1993 (as Good Bye Ayu)
- Warren Wiebe, 1994
- Jessica Folcker, 1998 (this version was featured in the 1998 South Korean film The Promise which starred Jeon Do-yeon and Park Shin-yang)
- René Froger, 2002
- Janice Vidal, 2005
- Yasmien Kurdi, 2007
- Lil B, 2010 (used as a sample)
- Kim Tae-woo, 2013
- Brenan Espartinez and Suy Galvez, 2015
