= Ballet for a Girl in Buchannon =

Song by Chicago

from the album Chicago
- Released: January 26, 1970
- Recorded: August 1969
- Genre: Jazz rock, soft rock, progressive rock
- Length: 12:55
- Label: Columbia Records
- Songwriter: James Pankow
- Producer: James William Guercio

"Ballet for a Girl in Buchannon" [sic], also known as "The Ballet" and "Make Me Smile Medley", is a nearly 13-minute mini-rock opera/song cycle/suite from Chicago's 1970 album Chicago (also called Chicago II). It was the group's first attempt at a long-format multi-part work.

It was composed by James Pankow, who got the inspiration to write the "Ballet" from his love of long classical music song cycles. According to a May 2018 interview with the Charleston Gazette-Mail, the songs were written in an attempt to win back his ex-fiancee, Terrie Heisler, who was at the time attending West Virginia Wesleyan College in Buckhannon, West Virginia.

"Ballet" takes up most of side two of Chicago and consists of seven tracks, three of which are instrumentals:

1. "Make Me Smile" (Lead vocal by Terry Kath)
2. "So Much to Say, So Much to Give" (Lead vocal by Robert Lamm)
3. "Anxiety's Moment" (Instrumental)
4. "West Virginia Fantasies" (Instrumental)
5. "Colour My World" (Lead vocal by Terry Kath)
6. "To Be Free" (Instrumental)
7. "Now More Than Ever" (Lead vocal by Terry Kath)

The final track, "Now More Than Ever," is a single-verse reprise of the suite's opening song, "Make Me Smile." The vocal songs within the suite can be viewed as telling the story of a man searching for a far away lost love and attempting to rekindle the love they had shared. Two of these songs reached the top ten on the U.S. Billboard Hot 100: a single edit of "Make Me Smile (/Now More Than Ever)" (#9, 1970) and "Colour My World" (#7, 1971).

The instrumental movement "West Virginia Fantasies" incorporates instrumental counterpoint extensively between the horns, guitar, and keyboards, exemplifying Chicago's skill at composing and arranging complex pieces.

The suite was recorded as a single track, titled "The Ballet," on their album Chicago XXVI: Live in Concert in 1999. The version on the 2005 DVD Chicago & Earth, Wind & Fire — Live at the Greek Theatre is called "Make Me Smile Medley," named after the suite's opening song.
