= If She Would Have Been Faithful... =

Single by Chicago

from the album Chicago 18
- B-side: "Forever"
- Released: March 6, 1987
- Genre: Rock
- Length: 3:51
- Label: Full Moon; Warner Bros.
- Songwriters: Steve Kipner; Randy Goodrum
- Producer: David Foster

Chicago singles chronology
"Will You Still Love Me?" (1986)	"If She Would Have Been Faithful..." (1987)	"Niagara Falls" (1987)

"If She Would Have Been Faithful..." is a song by the American rock band Chicago. It was released in March 1987 as the third single from their 1986 album Chicago 18. Jason Scheff performs the lead vocals. The song was written by Steve Kipner and Randy Goodrum, and produced by David Foster.

The single became a Top 10 hit on the Adult Contemporary chart and reached No. 17 on the Billboard Hot 100 chart in the United States.

== Charts ==
Chart (1987)	Peak position
Canada Top Singles (RPM)	54
Canada Adult Contemporary (RPM)	6
US Cash Box Top 100	16
US Billboard Hot 100	17
US Adult Contemporary (Billboard)	9
