= Where Do We Go from Here? (Chicago song) =

- Spanish B-side of the single "25 or 6 to 4".

Song by Chicago

from the album Chicago
- A-side: "25 or 6 to 4"
- Released: June 1970
- Recorded: August 1969
- Genre: Rock
- Length: 2:35
- Label: Columbia
- Songwriter: Peter Cetera
- Producer: James William Guercio

"Where Do We Go from Here?" (Note: Both the original 1970 Columbia vinyl LP (KGP 24 CS 77 XSM 151852) of the album, Chicago and the 2002 Rhino reissue of the album on CD (R2 77172) shows the title of the track, "Where Do We Go From Here?" with and without the question mark. On the 1977 vinyl LP, the track title is listed with the question mark on the inside front cover, but without the question mark on the center label of the disc. On the 2002 Rhino reissue on CD, the title appears with the question mark on the outside back page of the CD booklet, but appears without the question mark on page 13 inside the booklet. A catalog of copyright entries shows the title with the question mark, therefore the question mark is shown as part of the title in this article. (The re-issue, and some other sources, include this song as a “fifth movement” of “It Better End Soon”—even though the initial double-LP titling, the structure of the two songs, and the extended pause between them indicates two separate songs.)) is a song from the American rock band Chicago's second studio album, Chicago (1970). It was released as the B-side of the single "25 or 6 to 4", likewise taken from Chicago; that single went to number four on the Pop Singles chart in June 1970.

The song was also the very first musical composition from bassist Peter Cetera, who was by this time contributing more than on the debut album released the year before. The song deals with how life is short, and that if you look around you can see that people need to embrace each other with love all the time, and not just when the country is at an all-time low (hence the Vietnam War). The title line is taken from a TV reporter's comment during the broadcast of the 1969 Moon landing—widely seen as a historically positive event in stark contrast to the social upheaval of the time.

A live performance of the song can be found on their 1971 Chicago at Carnegie Hall album.

== Personnel ==
- Peter Cetera – lead vocals, bass
- Robert Lamm – acoustic piano, backing vocals
- Terry Kath – acoustic guitar, backing vocals
- Danny Seraphine – drums
