= Jordan Hill (singer) =

American singer-songwriter (born 1978)

- Born: Whitney Jordan Hill; April 17, 1978 (age 48); Knoxville, Tennessee, US
- Genres: Pop; soul; R&B
- Occupation: Singer-songwriter
- Instruments: Vocals; piano
- Years active: 1994–present
- Website: www.jordanhill.net

Whitney Jordan Hill (born April 17, 1978) is an American singer-songwriter. She was signed to record producer David Foster's label 143 Records, an imprint of Atlantic Records in 1995. Her first song, "Remember Me This Way"—produced by Foster—was the theme song for the 1995 film Casper.

== Early life and career ==
Born in Knoxville, Tennessee, Jordan Hill and her family later relocated to Los Angeles, where she completed her studies at the Hamilton Academy of Music and supported herself by playing at clubs and small venues.

She met David Foster in 1994 after performing at the producer’s California home. The pair understood each other almost immediately, and Foster wrote Hill's debut single “Remember Me This Way”. It saw the light in 1995 via Foster’s 143 Records and was featured on the soundtrack for the feature film Casper.

Jordan Hill's self-titled debut album was then released on May 21, 1996, and was produced by David Foster, Greg Charley, Rhett Lawrence, Jeff Pescetto, SoulShock & Karlin and Mario Winans. Hill covered many songs, such as Cheryl Lynn's "Got to Be Real", Oleta Adams' "I Just Had to Hear Your Voice", and Lisa Stansfield's "Make It Right".

The lead single of the album, "For the Love of You", produced by Foster and Winans, became a hit both on the Billboard Hot 100 and R&B/Hip-Hop charts. However, the remix version by Tony Moran became her biggest hit, entering the Top 10 on Billboard's Hot Dance Music/Club Play charts.

The second single, released only in the UK was "How Many Times" (which was later covered by Aretha Franklin) and the third single, also a UK exclusive, was "Too Much Heaven", a cover of the Bee Gees song and featured Barry Gibb singing backup. Due to a lack of support and promotion, she left the label.

Hill has worked with some notable artists, such as the Bee Gees and Jim Brickman, whose 1999 Top 10 adult contemporary hit "Destiny" featured Hill on vocals, along with Billy Porter. She resumed her solo career in 2012 with the festive single “Someday at Christmas,” reaching Number 11 on the Adult Contemporary chart.

Jordan Hill's second studio album was never released primarily due to a lack of label support distribution issues, and industry promotion conflicts.

Today, she continues to write music and perform, though focus has shifted from major commercial studio album cycles.

== Discography ==
=== Albums ===
Year	Album
1996	Jordan Hill: Debut album; Released: May 21, 1996; Label: 143 Records/Atlantic Records

=== Singles ===
Year	Song	Peak chart positions							Album
Year	Song	US	US Adult	AUS	BEL (Fla)	NED	UK	NZ	Album
1995	"Remember Me This Way"	80	31	99	49	17	80	—	Jordan Hill
1996	"For the Love of You"	66	—	182	—	—	—	35	Jordan Hill
1996	"How Many Times" (UK only)	—	—	—	—	—	—	—	Jordan Hill
1996	"Too Much Heaven"	—	—	155	—	—	—	13	Jordan Hill
2012	"Someday at Christmas"	—	11	—	—	—	—	—	N/A
2012	"This Christmas"	—	—	—	—	—	—	—	N/A
"—" denotes releases that did not chart or were not released in that country.

=== Other appearances ===
Year	Song	Album
1996	"What Am I Doing Here"	Rhythm of the Games: 1996 Olympic Games
1998	"Love Shouldn't Hurt" (with All-4-One, Michael Bolton, Stephen Bishop, Bobby Caldwell, Gregory Curtis, Laura Davis, Owen Elliot, Olivia Newton-John, Emmanuel Officer, Stephen Stills, Chris Stills, Richard Stites, Tamia, Ann Wilson, Carnie Wilson, Wendy Wilson)	Love Shouldn't Hurt (Charity album for National Committee to Prevent Child Abuse)
1999	"Destiny" (with Billy Porter)	Destiny (Jim Brickman album)
