= Warren Wiebe =

American singer

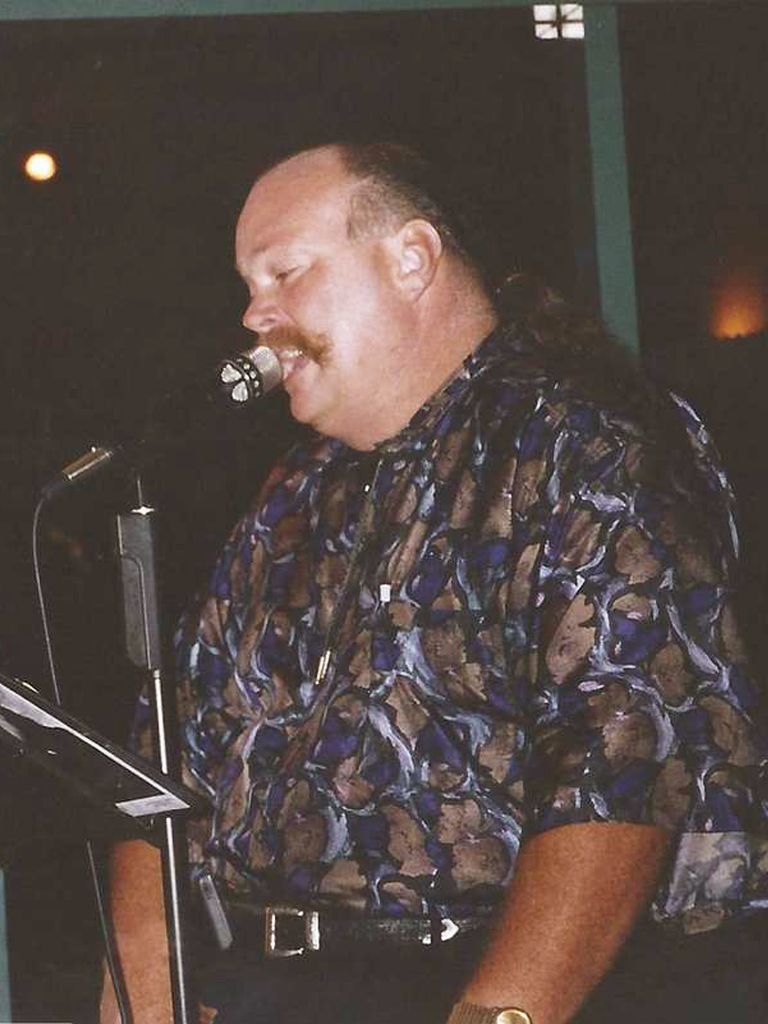

Background information
- Born: Warren Ray Wiebe; July 18, 1953; San Diego, California, U.S.
- Died: October 25, 1998 (aged 45) Glendale, California, U.S.
- Genres: Adult contemporary
- Occupation: Singer
- Instruments: Vocals, bass guitar
- Years active: 1968–1998
- Website: WarrenWiebe.com

Warren Ray Wiebe (July 18, 1953 – October 25, 1998) was an American vocalist and session musician best known for his work with David Foster, Jay Graydon, Celine Dion, Quincy Jones, his recordings on soundtracks and his performances of the national anthem before Los Angeles Kings games.

== Early life and education ==
Warren Wiebe was born in San Diego, California, on July 18, 1953, to Ruby and Abraham Wiebe. He attended Crawford High School, during which time he formed his own band, calling it Mankind. He sang and played bass.

== Career ==
In 1980, Wiebe got his first break when Bobbie Gentry invited him to Las Vegas to sing in her band.

Wiebe contributed bass and vocals to several San Diego area bands and performed five nights a week in venues such as The Wranglers Roost and with Bud Martin & Sound Advice at The Abeline, one of the showroom venues at the Town & Country Hotel in Hotel Circle, and participated in the San Diego Jazz Party.

Wiebe was discovered by David Foster and Burt Bacharach in Los Angeles in 1987. He was one of the lead vocalists contributing to the 1991 charity record "Voices That Care". Wiebe was introduced by David Foster as "his hot new discovery" at Foster’s benefit concert at Victoria General Hospital, where he performed “America The Beautiful” and was described by Adrian Chamberlain for the Times Colonist as having "a finely controlled, versatile voice tinged with soul inflections". In 1991, "If Not for Love" (written by Foster & Linda Thompson) was part of the One Good Cop soundtrack that featured Michael Keaton and Rene Russo.

Wiebe sang the duet "Listen to Me" with Celine Dion for the Listen to Me soundtrack.He performed “Safe Back In Your Arms” written by Darin Scheff, Tony Smith and Roxanne Seeman, appearing over the end-credits of the 1991 thriller Under Crystal Lake. Warren performed "Goodbye" as part of the television soundtrack One Life to Live: The Best of Love in 1994.

Wiebe performed the song "Human Touch", a ballad which was used as one of the ending theme songs for the 1996 anime After War Gundam X. The song was one of a very small number of anime theme songs that not only was performed with English lyrics but was composed by non-Japanese songwriters. An avid ice hockey fan, he was also known for his stirring performances of the US and Canadian national anthems and "America the Beautiful" before Los Angeles Kings games, especially during the time Wayne Gretzky played there.

He sang many demos for David Foster including "When I Fall in Love" for the film Sleepless in Seattle and when Celine Dion heard his singing she wanted him instead of Clive Griffin to sing on the track. In addition, he sang on the All-4-One hit "I Swear" and did backing vocals for many artists. He was also featured on Foster's 1990 release River of Love; his vocals were on the title track "River of Love", "Walk Away", "Is There a Chance", "Living for the Moment", "This Must Be Love" and his 1994 subsequent release Love Lights the World performing vocals on the track "Is There a Chance".

For Celine Dion's wedding, Wiebe was flown in to Montreal to perform "The Colour of My Love" with a thirty-piece orchestra conducted by David Foster.

On Jay Graydon's Airplay for the Planet, originally released in 1993 by Inside Out Records in Japan, Wiebe would perform two songs: "Roxann" (written by Bill Cantos, Jay Graydon, Valerie Hobel) and "You're Not Alone" (written by Bruce Gaitsch, Janea Chadwick, Janey Clewer, Jay Graydon).

Warren performed "Goodbye" as part of the television soundtrack One Life to Live: The Best of Love in 1994.

He was referred to by Quincy Jones as the "Soulful Rain Man" and was part of Jones' release Q's Jook Joint in 1995 performing a duet with Gloria Estefan on "Is It Love That We're Missing".

The Burt Bacharach collection release, Applause...The Look of Love included Wiebe's duet with Lalah Hathaway called "On My Own".

Wiebe was the singing voice of Dean Martin in the film The Rat Pack, released in 1998.

== Death ==
Wiebe committed suicide on October 25, 1998, after battling depression due to the deaths of his mother and a former high school friend. His body was found in his Glendale apartment. He was 45.

== Posthumous discography ==
=== Compilation and soundtrack album appearances ===
- The Real Me – Urs Wiesendanger (White Sail Records, 1998; Fast Peak Recordings, 2002; Pink Dogg Records, 2005) – "Another Chance for Love" (duet with Jerrie Lynn)
- Highest Calling, Visionary (Mt. Tamalpais Records, 1999) – "Anything for You", duet with Bill Champlin
- Light Mellow AOR-Groovin' & Breezin (Cool Sound Edition, 2000) – "Heart Don't Change My Mind"
- Camp soundtrack (Decca Records, 2003) – "I Believe in Us"
- Steve Dorff Original Demos – Warren Wiebe (Contante & Sonante, 2004) – featured Wiebe's vocals on all tracks "A Little Thing Called Life", "And Still Run Out of Time", "I Never Stopped Loving You", "True Love at Last", "Kindred Spirits", "The Echo of Your Whisper", "Every Time You Cross My Mind", "Love's the Silver Lining", "The Wait Was Worth the Angel", "In Love's Name", "I Just Fall in Love Again", "Before We Kiss Tonight Goodbye" and "Somewhere in Time"
- Somebody New – Urs Wiesendanger (Contante & Sonante, 2005) – Wiebe was featured on the title track "Somebody New" with Courtney Blooding and on "Hold Me"
- Snapshots – Hank Easton (Easton, 2007) – Wiebe featured on "Show Me a Sign"
- E35 Let's Sing J-Pop In English (Avex Entertainment, 2008) - Wiebe featured on disc 2, track 12 "True Love"
- E35-II Let's Sing J-Pop in English (Avex Entertainment, 2008) - Wiebe featured on disc 3, track 11 "Midsummer Fruit" (真夏の果実)
- Fly Away – David Foster (Contante & Sonante, 2009) – Wiebe's vocals on "Live Each Day"
- Highlights & Rarities (Contante & Sonante, 2011) – "A Little Thing Called Life", "Kindred Spirits", "Somewhere in Time" and "My Angel's Voice"
- Original Demos – Tom Snow featuring Warren Wiebe (Contante & Sonante, 2013) – lead vocals by Wiebe on "Beauty Outside Beauty Within", "It's Not the End of the World", "Time to Be Lovers", "Town of Dreams", "You're Welcome in My Life", "I Must Have Been Blind", "I Can See Forever", "That's What Love Can Do", "We're All in This Together", "Ronnie-O", "Love Has a Mind of Its Own" and "Bridges of the Heart"
- Velvet soundtrack (2013–2016) – "For Your Love" and "Carrie"
- A Passion For Music - Diane Warren (Realsongs, 1997) - Wiebe featured on tracks 8 "I Can't change The Way You Don't Feel" & 9 "I Don't Want To Be Alone For Christmas" of disc 5 and track 11 "Why Goodbye" of Disc 6
- Original Demos – Gardner & Fuller featuring Warren Wiebe (Contante & Sonante, 2016) – Wiebe's lead vocals on 4 tracks: "17 Years", "Slip Away", "Nothing That I Wouldn't Do" and "This Blue Tattoo"
- Original Demos – Burt Bacharach & Tonio K (Contante & Sonante, 2017) – one track featuring Wiebe, "Never Take That Chance Again"
- Walkin' on Air – Tomi Malm (Contante & Sonante, 2017) – "Show Me a Sign" (written by Hank Easton), Wiebe performed a virtual duet with Zosia Karbowiak with Malm on keyboards; other players included Lars-Erik Dahle, Lars Daugaard, Bernt Rune Stray and Eric Marienthal
- Original Demos - Warren Wiebe (Contante & Sonante, 2018) - compilation featuring Wiebe's vocals on all tracks: "The Colour Of My Love", "Live Each Day", Never Take That Chance Again", "Love Made Me Wait", "A Little Thing Called Life", "The Echo Of Your Whisper", "You're Welcome In My Life", "Spend A Little Time With You", "17 Years", "Nothing That I Wouldn't Do", "The Day I First Saw You", ""Lorelei", "Don't Tell My Heart", "Make A Wish"
- Featuring Warren Wiebe Originals – Roxanne Seeman, Darin Scheff and Tony Smith: "Safe Back In Your Arms" from Under Crystal Lake, "After So Much Love"

=== Guest singles ===
Year	Single	Artist	US Hot 100	US AC	Album
1991	"Voices That Care"	Various	11	6	single only

== Music videos ==
Year	Video	Director
1991	"Voices That Care" (Various Artists)	David S. Jackson and Jim Yukich
