= Voices That Care =

Single by Voices That Care
- Released: March 13, 1991
- Recorded: 1991
- Genre: Pop; gospel; R&B; soul
- Length: 4:56
- Label: Giant
- Songwriters: David Foster; Linda Thompson; Peter Cetera
- Producer: David Foster

"Voices That Care" is a 1991 charity song written by David Foster, Linda Thompson, and Peter Cetera and recorded by a large supergroup of popular musicians, entertainers and athletes. The song was released as a single on March 13, 1991 by Giant Records. The song was produced by Foster. The whole group of talented people involved was also collectively known as Voices That Care and was shown as such on the single release along marketing materials. The charity single and supporting documentary music video were intended to help boost the morale of U.S. troops involved in Operation Desert Storm, as well as supporting the International Red Cross organization. The documentary, which followed the recording of the single to the music video's presentation to the troops in the Middle East, aired on Fox in the evening of February 28, 1991; coincidentally, the day when fighting in Desert Storm ended.

"Voices That Care" reached No. 11 on the Billboard Hot 100 and No. 6 on the Adult Contemporary chart. In Canada, the song reached No. 61. Warren Wiebe, a friend of Foster and smaller-known vocalist at the time who recorded the demo of the song, was invited by Foster to sing lead and deliver the last solo lines of the song. Seven years after the charity song's release, Wiebe died on October 25, 1998 (aged 45). The music video was directed by Jim Yukich (who helmed the Michael Davis-wrote film Double Dragon) and produced by Paul Flattery for FYI (known as "Flattery Yukich Inc").

== Formats and track listings ==
4-track CD-single

1. "Voices That Care" — 4:56
2. "Voices That Care" — (demo) 4:56
3. "Messages of Care" — 4:33
4. "Voices That Care" (instrumental) — 3:36

== Musicians at the original recording session ==
=== Lead vocalists ===
The following is the order of appearance in the song:

- Ralph Tresvant
- Randy Travis
- Celine Dion
- Peter Cetera
- Bobby Brown
- Brenda Russell
- Jani Lane
- Luther Vandross
- Garth Brooks
- Kathy Mattea
- Gunnar & Matthew Nelson
- Michael Bolton
- Pointer Sisters
- Little Richard
- Will Smith — rap solo
- Warren Wiebe

=== Choir members ===
In the music video, only footage is shown of Ahmad Rashad, Clyde Drexler, Dominique Wilkins, David Robinson, Michael Jordan and Magic Johnson singing the song on a basketball court, but they are not present at the actual choir session. Wayne Gretzky is also seen in a brief clip.

- Marcus Allen
- Paul Anka
- Catherine Bach
- Brian Bosworth
- Downtown Julie Brown
- Jimmy Buffett
- Bugs Bunny
- Gary Busey
- Gay Byrne
- Nell Carter
- David Cassidy
- Chevy Chase
- Candy Clark
- Clarence Clemons
- Kevin Costner
- Cindy Crawford
- Billy Crystal
- Vic Damone
- Ted Danson
- Rick Dees
- Fred Dinenage
- Micky Dolenz
- Clyde Drexler
- Sheena Easton
- Sally Field
- Emerson Fittipaldi
- Richard Gere
- Debbie Gibson
- Whoopi Goldberg
- Janet Gretzky
- Wayne Gretzky
- Harry Hamlin
- Mariel Hemingway
- Marilu Henner
- Orel Hershiser
- Noddy Holder
- Al Jarreau
- Magic Johnson
- Tommy Lee Jones
- Michael Jordan
- Carol Kane
- Joanna Kerns
- Don King
- Martin Kove
- Louie Louie
- Jon Lovitz
- Ali MacGraw
- Melissa Manchester
- Peter Max
- Alyssa Milano
- Dudley Moore
- Jeffrey Osborne
- Donny Osmond
- Jean-Pierre Pernaut
- Michelle Pfeiffer
- Sheryl Lee Ralph
- Ahmad Rashad
- Helen Reddy
- David Robinson
- Paul Rodriguez
- Kenny Rogers
- Kurt Russell
- Katey Sagal
- Fred Savage
- Jane Seymour
- William Shatner
- Nicollette Sheridan
- Brooke Shields
- Jack Smethurst
- Sissy Spacek
- Shakin' Stevens
- Stephen Stills
- Meryl Streep
- Alan Thicke
- Linda Thompson
- Tiffany
- Michael Tucker
- Mike Tyson
- Blair Underwood
- Jean-Claude Van Damme
- Luther Vandross
- Lindsay Wagner
- Roger Whittaker
- Dominique Wilkins
- Billy Dee Williams
- Warrant
- Paul Williams
- Henry Winkler
- James Woods
- Gary Wright
- Koko B Ware

=== The band ===
- David Foster – keyboards
- Simon Franglen – Synclavier programming
- Dean Parks – acoustic guitar
- Michael Thompson – additional guitar
- Mark Knopfler – guitar solo
- Kenny G – soprano saxophone solo
- Brian Adler, Morgan Ames, Lois Blaisch, Joy Burnworth, Kenny Cetera, Barry Coffing, Marshall Connors, Laura Creamer, Randy Crenshaw, Lorraine Feather, Tim Feehan, Roger Freeland, David Freeman, Robin Hild, Peter Hix, Jeannie Jackson, Linda Jackson, Liz Jackson, Angie Jaree, David Joyce and Gael MacGregor – background vocals
