= Padhyangan =

Indonesian comedy troupe

Padhyangan, also known as Project-P or P-Project, is a comedy troupe from the Indonesian city of Bandung. They were formed in 1982 by Iszur Muchtar and Denny Chandra, and then in 1986 joined by Daan Aria, Joehana, Iang Darmawan and Wawan Hanura. Their name was extracted from the two alma maters of the members, the Padjadjaran University and the Parahyangan Catholic University. They first became popular with a radio show called "Ozserba" that aired every Wednesday evening on Radio Oz in Bandung. Their style of comedy is a mixture between Monty Python and "Weird Al" Yankovic, making parodies of popular culture like movies and music and even myths.
