= Stay the Night (Chicago song) =

Single by Chicago

from the album Chicago 17
- B-side: "Only You"
- Released: April 18, 1984
- Genre: Rock
- Length: 3:48
- Label: Full Moon; Warner Bros.
- Songwriters: Peter Cetera; David Foster
- Producer: David Foster

Chicago singles chronology
"What You're Missing" (1983)	"Stay the Night" (1984)	"Hard Habit to Break" (1984)

"Stay the Night" is a song written by Peter Cetera and David Foster for the group Chicago and recorded for their album Chicago 17 (1984), with Cetera singing the lead vocals. The song features noted session Toto drummer Jeff Porcaro taking the place of Chicago drummer Danny Seraphine.

== Reception ==
"Stay the Night" was the first single released from Chicago 17. Commenting on this decision, Cetera said that "everybody expected Chicago to come out with a ballad. So we thought, 'Let's come from left field with the first single'". The single debuted at No. 49 on the U.S. Billboard Hot 100, which at the time was the band's highest entry at the time, beating out "25 or 6 to 4", which had entered the chart at No. 50 in July 1970. The song later peaked at number 16 on the Hot 100 and No. 7 on the Top Tracks chart. Cetera commented on the song's chart performance in an article published by Billboard in 1985.

What 'Stay the Night' did was give us radio stations that hadn't played us in years. Sure, some of the stations that had been playing us didn't play that song, which is why it didn't climb as high as it might have, but a lot of the stations that hadn't been playing us finally did.

Cash Box said that the song was very different from Chicago's "vocal harmonies and horns heyday," having "a hard rocking drum beat, some techno-synth backing and an upper-register lead vocal." Billboard called the single "one of the hottest radio adds of the week" with the band's "trademark vocal sound in an aggressive, percussive setting."

== Music video ==
This song's music video, featuring a car chase in a 1968 Oldsmobile 442, was filmed in and around the Los Angeles River. The music video was directed by Bob Giraldi and Bill Bates, with post-production being conducted by Red Car Editing in Los Angeles. In a 1985 interview, bandmate Robert Lamm said a stuntman was used for several scenes. The Houston Press said that Cetera also did some of his own stunts for the music video. The woman driving the Oldsmobile was portrayed by Ingrid Anderson, with Debbie Evans performing the stunts.

== Chart history ==
Chart (1984)	Peak position
Canada Top Singles (RPM)	47
US Billboard Hot 100	16
US Top Tracks (Billboard)	7
