= All Roads Lead to You (Chicago song) =

- Japanese CD cover

Single by Chicago

from the album The Heart of Chicago 1967–1998 Volume II
- B-side: Show Me a Sign
- Released: April 1998
- Recorded: 1998
- Genre: Soft rock
- Length: 4:20
- Label: Reprise
- Songwriters: Desmond Child; Marc Beeson
- Producer: Roy Bittan

Chicago singles chronology
"The Only One" (1997)	"All Roads Lead to You" (1998)	"Show Me a Sign" (1998)

"All Roads Lead to You" is a song by the American rock band Chicago. It was released as a single from their fifth compilation album, The Heart of Chicago 1967–1998 Volume II. It was written by Desmond Child and Marc Beeson and produced by E Street Band keyboardist Roy Bittan. Sung by Bill Champlin, Robert Lamm, and Jason Scheff, it peaked at No. 14 on the Adult Contemporary chart.

== Reception ==
Billboard wrote that the song "combines the jazzy horns inherent in the band's early hits with the power balladry of later tracks" and called it "an appealing blend that will please loyalists, while also flirting with mature AC listeners".

In a review for Something Else! Reviews, Preston Frazier described "All Roads Lead to You" as "pure pop but pleasant," highlighting Roy Bittan's production for its "subtle electric-piano textures and organic feel." He praised the "uncluttered" arrangement and the vocal interplay between Bill Champlin and Jason Scheff, noting that their performance "rekindled their Chicago 18 magic." Frazier believed that the song played to the band's strengths and "wasn't a daring break from the past."

== Personnel ==
- Bill Champlin – keyboards, lead and backing vocals
- Jason Scheff – bass, lead and backing vocals
- Robert Lamm – keyboards, lead and backing vocals
- Lee Loughnane – trumpet
- James Pankow – trombone, backing vocals
- Walter Parazaider – saxophones
- Tris Imboden – drums
- Keith Howland – guitar, backing vocals

== Charts ==
Chart (1998)	Peak position
US Adult Contemporary (Billboard)	14
