= You're the Inspiration =

1984 single by Chicago

- UK vinyl single

Single by Chicago

from the album Chicago 17
- B-side: "Once in a Lifetime"
- Released: October 29, 1984
- Genre: Soft rock
- Length: 3:50
- Label: Full Moon; Warner Bros.
- Songwriters: Peter Cetera; David Foster
- Producer: David Foster

Chicago singles chronology
"Hard Habit to Break" (1984)	"You're the Inspiration" (1984)	"Along Comes a Woman" (1985)

Music video
- "You're the Inspiration" on YouTube

"You're the Inspiration" is a song written by Peter Cetera and David Foster for the group Chicago and recorded for their fourteenth studio album Chicago 17 (1984), with Cetera singing lead vocals. The third single released from that album, it reached No. 3 on the US Billboard Hot 100 chart in January 1985 and also topped the Billboard Adult Contemporary chart at the same time. The song won honors for Foster and Cetera from the American Society of Composers, Authors and Publishers (ASCAP) in 1986 in the most-performed songs category.

Peter Cetera re-recorded the song for his 1997 solo album You're the Inspiration: A Collection. That same year he also recorded a single version with the R&B vocal group Az Yet.

== History ==
Peter Cetera stated in a 2004 interview that "You're the Inspiration" started out as a song for Kenny Rogers:

"David Foster called me up and he said, ‘I’m in the studio with Kenny Rogers, and he would like you to write a song for him.’ And I said, ‘That’s great! As a matter of fact, I’m leaving for Italy...’ I was going to Europe for something. I don’t remember [why]...and this was like nine o’clock in the morning. I said, ‘I’m leaving for Italy tonight around five o’clock. I’ll be there about two weeks, and I’ll call you when I come back.’ And he goes, ‘No, no, no, he means, like, now.’ (....) And so David was in the studio...and of course...you know, last minute. And so I said, ‘Alright, well you come over here right now, and we’ll see what we can do.’ So in the midst of packing, David drove out to where I was then living. And we basically, in about three hours, came up with a little chordal structure for “You’re the Inspiration,” which it wasn’t called that at the time. And we sort of made this little tape of this chord structure; I took it on the plane, [and] went to Italy. And, of course, lying in these beautiful baroque and marble rooms, and singing out the window...I was writing things about, ‘Michelangelo you should know, Michelangelo.’ And I came up with, oh...you’re the inspiration! [So, I] came back with the words, worked on this melody, and came back and presented the song. And [Kenny] basically didn’t have the time or didn’t want to do it. Good for me!"

Cetera then changed some of the words and recorded the song with Chicago for their Chicago 17 album.

== Composition and recording ==
Cetera's younger brother, Kenny, provides background vocals on the original recorded version by Chicago.

Kat Caudill, writing for American Songwriter magazine says the song "expresses love by telling someone they inspire you . . ."

== Reception ==
Billboard said that it was "somewhere between a hymn and an anthem."

In an article for Stereogum, Brad Shoup calls "You're the Inspiration" the "powerhouse" of the Chicago 17 album. "colored with squelchbass, tastefully splashed with cymbals, garlanded with bland strings. The chorus keeps feinting at a key change."

According to Parade Entertainment and News Editor, Lizzy Buczak, "It quickly became one of the band’s signature songs, with heartfelt lyrics, impressive chord progressions and harmonies, and a chorus that emphasized Chicago’s comeback, all while introducing them to a new generation of listeners."

== Music video ==
The video depicted the band performing intercut with scenes of embracing couples of varying ages ranging from young kids to a couple resembling Billy Idol and Madonna at the time. Lead singer Peter Cetera is seen wearing a T-shirt from the British goth band Bauhaus. During his performance, Cetera is sitting the whole time strumming his bass, which is flipped upside down.

== Charts ==
=== Weekly charts ===
Chart (1984–1985)	Peak position
Australia (Kent Music Report)	43
Canada Top Singles (RPM)	5
Canada Adult Contemporary (RPM)	1
Ireland (IRMA)	9
Netherlands (Dutch Top 40)	36
Netherlands (Single Top 100)	32
New Zealand (Recorded Music NZ)	30
Sweden (Sverigetopplistan)	6
UK Singles (Official Charts)	14
US Billboard Hot 100	3
US Adult Contemporary (Billboard)	1

=== Year-end charts ===
Chart (1985)	Position
Canada Top Singles (RPM)	31
US Billboard Hot 100	37

== Certifications ==
Region	Certification	Certified units/sales
New Zealand (RMNZ)	Platinum	30,000^{‡}
United Kingdom (BPI)	Silver	200,000^{‡}
^{‡} Sales+streaming figures based on certification alone.

== Peter Cetera feat. Az Yet version ==
"You're the Inspiration" (remix)

Single by Peter Cetera featuring Az Yet

from the album You're the Inspiration: A Collection
- Released: August 25, 1997
- Length: 4:07
- Label: Platinum Entertainment
- Songwriters: Peter Cetera, David Foster
- Producer: Babyface

Az Yet singles chronology
"Hard to Say I'm Sorry" (1997)	"You're the Inspiration" (remix) (1997)	"Keep on Pushin'" (2007)

In 1997, Peter Cetera re-recorded "You're the Inspiration" for his solo album You're the Inspiration: A Collection. Since Cetera had featured earlier in the year on R&B group Az Yet's cover of "Hard to Say I'm Sorry", they collaborated on a remix of Cetera's solo recording of "You're the Inspiration", which was released as a single. This version reached No. 77 on the Billboard Hot 100 and No. 29 on the Adult Contemporary chart. Like Az Yet's "Hard to Say I'm Sorry", this version was also produced by Babyface.

=== Music video ===
The music video for Peter Cetera and Az Yet's "You're the Inspiration" was directed by Steven R. Monroe and filmed at Westward Beach (Malibu, California).

=== Track listings ===
1. "You're the Inspiration" – 4:07
2. "Hard to Say I'm Sorry" – 3:13

=== Charts ===
Chart (1997)	Peak position
Netherlands (Single Top 100)	72
US Billboard Hot 100	77
US Adult Contemporary (Billboard)	29

== Cover versions ==
Hawaiian singers Willz and Maile recorded a reggae version of "You're the Inspiration" in 2022, with an accompanying music video. Daily Reggae called it a "brilliant island spin" on the song, and featured it as the "song of the day" on the Daily Reggae web site. Their version made it into "Hawaii's Top 10", and peaked at number four on that list. The song also made it to number five on the "Reggae Global Top40".

== In other media ==
In 2026 the song was used during a scene of Ted Lasso (season 4, episode 2 of ). Lizzy Buzcak of Parade magazine writes, "[It] plays softly in the background . . . during a heartfelt and pivotal moment as Jason Sudeikis’ Ted reconnects with best friend/soulmate/fellow coach Beard (Brendan Hunt) at the pub upon returning to England to coach the AFC Richmond women’s soccer team. In an article for Decider, writer Nicole Gallucci terms the use of "You're the Inspiration" "an absolutely iconic scene-setter". The episode first aired on Apple TV on August 12, 2026.

The song was featured in the 2025 film Novocaine. According to director Dan Berk, the song was one of the directors' first choices for a scene, serving as a "funny juxtaposition" to the "insane violence" on screen. He added that the song was the most expensive license in the movie - they were made to "pay a lot" because of the type of scene it would be played over.

The song was featured in promotional television advertisement for the 2017 NFL Super Bowl, titled "Super Bowl Baby Legends", which "imagines what Mike Ditka, Michael Irvin, Vince Lombardi, Joe Namath, Bill Belichick, Marshawn Lynch and Von Miller may have looked like as babies -- mustaches, sunglasses, stud earrings and all."

In 2013 Brigham Young University (BYU) basketball team put out a video of three of its members—Tyler Haws, Luke Worthington and Skyler Halford—lip-syncing to the song. Rob Dauster noted it for NBCSports because, "There isn’t much in this world that I find funnier than a couple of big-time collegiate athletes sitting in a field and awkwardly full-body lip-syncing to an ‘80s love ballad."

== See also ==
- List of Hot Adult Contemporary number ones of 1985
