= Chicago VIII =

Studio album by Chicago
- Released: March 24, 1975
- Recorded: August – September 1974
- Studios: Caribou Ranch, Nederland, Colorado
- Genres: Jazz fusion; progressive rock
- Length: 39:18
- Label: Columbia
- Producer: James William Guercio

Chicago chronology
Chicago VII (1974)	Chicago VIII (1975)	Chicago IX: Chicago's Greatest Hits (1975)

Singles from Chicago VIII
- 1. "Harry Truman" Released: February 1975; 2. "Old Days" Released: April 1975; 3. "Brand New Love Affair" Released: July 1975

Professional ratings
Review scores
Source	Rating
Allmusic	2/5 stars

Chicago VIII is the seventh studio album by American rock band Chicago, released on March 24, 1975 by Columbia Records. Following the experimental jazz/pop stylings of Chicago VII, the band returned to a more streamlined rock-based sound on this follow-up.

== Background ==
After five consecutive years of constant activity, the band members of Chicago were feeling drained as they came to record Chicago VIII at producer James William Guercio's Caribou Ranch in Colorado during the summer of 1974. While the variety in styles explored on Chicago VIII were reminiscent of Chicago VI, this particular album had a more distinct rock feel, as exemplified on Peter Cetera's "Anyway You Want" (later covered by Canadian singer Charity Brown) and "Hideaway", as well as Terry Kath's Hendrix tribute "Oh, Thank You Great Spirit" and James Pankow's hit "Old Days" (#5). The ballad "Brand New Love Affair, Part I & II" charted at #61.

Preceded by Lamm's "Harry Truman" (#13) as lead single, Chicago VIII was held over for release until March 1975 as Chicago VII was still ranked high in the charts. While it easily reached #1 in the US, the album had a mediocre critical reception — still commonly considered, by some, as one of their weakest albums from the original lineup, resulting in the briefest chart stay of any Chicago album thus far. It was also the first album to feature session percussionist Laudir de Oliveira as a full-fledged band member rather than a sideman, a new addition to the original lineup.

Inside the original LP package was an iron-on t-shirt decal of the album cover and a poster of the band in a station wagon being pulled over by a policeman.

On the RPM Canada charts, confusion ensued when the LP was misidentified during its chart run as Chicago VII; the catalog number listed proved it was really VIII.

This album was mixed and released in both stereo and quadraphonic. In 2002, Chicago VIII was remastered and reissued by Rhino Records with two unreleased songs: "Sixth Sense" (an instrumental, or possibly a backing track) by Kath and "Bright Eyes" by Lamm, as well as a version of "Satin Doll" recorded for a Dick Clark's "Rockin' New Year's Eve" special - all as bonus tracks.

== Track listing ==
Side one
No.	Title	Writer(s)	Vocalist(s)	Length
1.	"Anyway You Want"	Peter Cetera	Cetera	3:37
2.	"Brand New Love Affair, Part I & II"	James Pankow	Kath & Cetera	4:28
3.	"Never Been in Love Before"	Robert Lamm	Cetera	4:10
4.	"Hideaway"	Cetera	Cetera	4:44
5.	"Till We Meet Again"	Terry Kath	Kath	2:03

Side two
No.	Title	Writer(s)	Vocalist(s)	Length
6.	"Harry Truman"	Lamm	Lamm	3:01
7.	"Oh, Thank You Great Spirit"	Kath	Kath	7:19
8.	"Long Time No See"	Lamm	Lamm	2:46
9.	"Ain't It Blue?"	Lamm	Kath & Cetera	3:26
10.	"Old Days"	Pankow	Cetera	3:31

2002 reissue bonus tracks
No.	Title	Writer(s)	Vocalist(s)	Length
11.	"Sixth Sense" (Rehearsal)	Kath	Instrumental	5:07
12.	"Bright Eyes" (Rehearsal)	Lamm	Lamm	3:41
13.	"Satin Doll" (Live)	Duke Ellington, Billy Strayhorn, Johnny Mercer	Instrumental	2:48

== Personnel ==
Chicago

- Peter Cetera – bass, lead and backing vocals
- Terry Kath – electric and acoustic guitars, lead and backing vocals
- Robert Lamm – keyboards, lead and backing vocals
- Lee Loughnane – trumpet, backing vocals
- James Pankow – trombone, brass arrangements
- Walter Parazaider – saxophones, flute, clarinet
- Danny Seraphine – drums
- Laudir de Oliveira – percussion

Additional personnel

- Caribou Kitchenettes – vocal chorus on "Harry Truman" (John Carsello, Donna Conroy, Laudir de Oliveira, Bob Eberhardt, Steve Fagin, Kristy Ferguson, Linda Greene, Lee Loughnane, Brandy Maitland, Katherine Ogden, James Pankow, Walter Parazaider, Joanne Rocconi, Richard Torres and Angele Warner)
- String orchestrations on "Brand New Love Affair" and "Old Days" – Patrick Williams

== Production ==
- James William Guercio – producer
- Wayne Tarnowski – engineer
- Jeff Guercio – engineer
- Mark Guercio – engineer
- Phil Ramone – mixing
- John Berg – cover design
- Nick Fasciano – cover design
- Anthony Maggiore – artwork and handwriting
- Reid Miles – poster photography

== Charts ==
Chart (1975)	Position
Australian Albums (Kent Music Report)	27
Canada Top Albums/CDs (RPM)	3
Japanese Albums (Oricon)	40
New Zealand Albums (RMNZ)	30
Norwegian Albums (VG-lista)	6
US Billboard 200	1

== Certifications ==
Region	Certification	Certified units/sales
Canada (Music Canada)	Gold	50,000^{^}
United States (RIAA)	Platinum	1,000,000^{^}
^{^} Shipments figures based on certification alone.
