= Old Days =

Single by Chicago

from the album Chicago VIII
- B-side: "Hideaway"
- Released: April 1975
- Recorded: 1974
- Genre: Rock
- Length: 3:31
- Label: Columbia
- Songwriter: James Pankow
- Producer: James William Guercio

Chicago singles chronology
| "Harry Truman" (1975) | "Old Days" (1975) | "Brand New Love Affair" (1975) |

"Old Days" is a song written by James Pankow for the group Chicago and recorded for their album Chicago VIII (1975). It was the second single released from that album, with lead vocals by Peter Cetera.

== Background ==
Pankow has said that the song is a nostalgic piece about his childhood:

"It touches on key phrases that, although they date me, are pretty right-on in terms of images of my childhood. The Howdy Doody Show on television and collecting baseball cards and comic books."

Pankow told group biographer James William Ruhlmann that the group stopped performing the song live because Cetera refused to sing it, calling the lyrics "corny".

Cash Box praised the "great horn work," "Danny Seraphine's fine drum parts," and Terry Kath's "great guitar licks." Record World said that Chicago's "wall-to-wall sound returns, this time abetted by Pat Williams strings, on a side that's destined to be this year's 'Saturday in the Park.'"

== Chart performance ==
"Old Days" reached #5 on the US Billboard Hot 100, #3 on the US Billboard Adult Contemporary, and #6 on the US Cash Box Top 100.

=== Weekly charts ===
| Chart (1975) | Peak position |
|---|---|
| Australia (Kent Music Report) | 80 |
| Canada RPM Top Singles | 6 |
| Canada RPM Adult Contemporary | 6 |
| New Zealand | 22 |
| US Billboard Hot 100 | 5 |
| US Billboard Adult Contemporary | 3 |
| US Cash Box Top 100 | 6 |

=== Year-end charts ===
| Chart (1975) | Rank |
|---|---|
| Canada | 74 |
| U.S. (Joel Whitburn's Pop Annual) | 107 |

== Personnel ==
- Peter Cetera - lead vocals, bass
- Robert Lamm - piano, Hammond organ, harpsichord, backing vocals
- Terry Kath - fuzzed wah-wah electric guitars, backing vocals
- Danny Seraphine - drums
- Laudir de Oliveira - percussion
- James Pankow - trombone, backing vocals
- Lee Loughnane - trumpet
- Walter Parazaider - tenor saxophone

Additional Personnel

- Patrick Williams - string orchestrations

== Use in media ==
"Old Days" is featured on the soundtrack of the movie Starsky & Hutch (2004).
