= Chicago (album) =

Studio album by Chicago
- Released: January 26, 1970
- Recorded: August 1969
- Studios: CBS 30th Street, New York City; CBS, Hollywood
- Genres: Rock; jazz rock; progressive rock
- Length: 66:08
- Label: Columbia
- Producer: James William Guercio

Chicago chronology
Chicago Transit Authority (1969)	Chicago (1970)	Chicago III (1971)

Singles from Chicago
- 1. "Make Me Smile" Released: March 1970; 2. "25 or 6 to 4" Released: June 1970

Chicago (retroactively known as Chicago II) is the second studio album by the American rock band Chicago, released on January 26, 1970, by Columbia Records. Like their debut album, Chicago Transit Authority (1969), it is a double album. It was their first album released under the name Chicago—the band's prior name, Chicago Transit Authority, was changed due to a threatened lawsuit from the actual mass-transit operator of the same name—and the first to use the cursive new Chicago logo, which was revamped and interpolated from the previous logo.

Chicago was commercially successful. It reached No. 4 on the US Billboard 200 and No. 6 on the UK Albums Chart, and produced three top ten singles on the Billboard Hot 100. It was certified Gold by the Recording Industry Association of America (RIAA) in April of the same year of its release, and certified Platinum in 1991. The album received three Grammy Award nominations at the 1971 Grammy Awards: Album of the Year, Best Contemporary Vocal Performance by a Duo, Group or Chorus, and Best Album Cover. It was voted the best album of 1970 by readers of Cash Box magazine, and the 1971 best small-combo LP by readers of Playboy magazine.

== History ==
The album was released in 1970 after the band had shortened its name from "The Chicago Transit Authority" following the release of their self-titled debut album the previous year, in order to avoid legal action being threatened by the actual mass-transit company. The official title of the album is Chicago, although it came to be known as Chicago II, keeping it in line with the succession of Roman numeral-titled albums that officially began with Chicago III in 1971.

Chicago Transit Authority was a success, yet Chicago is considered by many to be the group's breakthrough album, yielding three singles that made it into the top ten of the Billboard Hot 100, including "Make Me Smile" (number 9), "Colour My World" (number 7), and "25 or 6 to 4" (number 4).

Chicago was released in January 1970 on Columbia Records and was an instant hit, reaching number 4 on the Billboard 200 in the United States and number 6 in the UK. Columbia Records was very active in promoting its quadraphonic four-channel surround-sound format in the mid-1970s, and nine of Chicago's first ten albums were made available in quad. The quad mix features elements not heard in the standard stereo mix, including additional guitar work from virtuoso Terry Kath in "25 Or 6 To 4" and a different vocal take from Lamm in "Wake Up Sunshine," which reveals a different lyric in the song's last line.

In 2002, Chicago was remastered and reissued on one CD by Rhino Records with the single versions of "Make Me Smile" and "25 or 6 to 4" as bonus tracks. Rhino released a DVD-Audio version of the album in 2003, featuring both Advanced Resolution Stereo and 5.1 surround sound mixes. In 2016, British producer and musician Steven Wilson remixed Chicago from the original multitrack tapes. This version was released on January 27, 2017, by Rhino Records. A vinyl edition of the remix cut by Kevin Gray was released on August 11, 2017. Robert Lamm stated in an interview that the album has been nominated for the Grammy Hall of Fame more than once.

== Musical style, writing, composition ==
In a 2015 article, Classic Rock Review says the album saw Chicago's, "full immersion into mainstream success while still building on their fusion of rock, funk and jazz."

In Danny Seraphine's book Street Player, he describes it this way: "In between the dates of our touring schedule, we somehow found the opportunity to jump into CBS Studios in Los Angeles and record a second album in August 1969. Whereas the first record was a compilation of raw energy, we took a more controlled approach to our new effort."

The centerpiece of the album was the 13-minute song cycle "Ballet for a Girl in Buchannon" written by trombone player James Pankow, from which came the singles "Make Me Smile" and "Colour My World". Guitarist Terry Kath also participated in an extended classically styled cycle of four pieces, three of which were co-written by arranger, composer, and pianist Peter Matz. Politically outspoken keyboardist Robert Lamm expresses his qualms in "It Better End Soon", another modular piece. Bassist Peter Cetera contributed his first song to Chicago with "Where Do We Go From Here?".

== Recording, production ==
The album was produced by James William Guercio, who was Chicago's producer for its first eleven albums, and was recorded in less than a month, during August 1969.

In 1970, James Pankow said about the album, "We . . . think it is better recorded and better played than the first. None of us feel, though, that we are really a recording group yet. We are all scared in the studio. We are really a live group."

== Artwork, packaging ==
The Chicago logo, which made its first appearance on the cover of this album, was designed by John Berg and fashioned by Nick Fasciano, who were both nominated for a Grammy Award for Best Album Cover for their efforts. John Berg said the Coca-Cola logo was the inspiration for the Chicago logo. The cover art work is part of the permanent collection of the Museum of Modern Art in New York City. The band's official web site labels the cover design, "silver bar."

The double-LP album's inner cover includes the playlist; the entire lyrics to "It Better End Soon"; a "Producer's Note" stating, "This endeavor should be experienced sequentially"; and a declaration written by Robert Lamm, "With this album, we dedicate ourselves, our futures and our energies to the people of the revolution. And the revolution in all of its forms."

== Reception ==
=== Critical reception ===
Contemporary reviews for the album were mixed. In his review for the Chicago Sun Times, writer Al Rudis says Chicago's second album "confirms" that "Chicago is one of the most exciting, most original, and most accomplished jazz-rock groups in existence." whereas in a review for The Village Voice, Robert Christgau gave a review of Chicago as a "D+" and called it "sterile and stupid", writing that if "Duke Ellington never got away with an extended work for horns and meaningfulness, [what] makes James William Guercio and the self-designated revolutionaries who are his cohorts think they can?"

There have been positive retrospective reviews. Lindsay Planer from AllMusic gave the album four-and-a-half out of five stars and said its songs "underscore the solid foundation of complex jazz changes with heavy electric rock & roll that the band so brazenly forged on the first set". Jim Beviglia, writing for American Songwriter, said, "50 years after its release, Chicago II still stands as one of the band’s signature achievements. ...Listening to Chicago II now, it is remarkable just how smoothly the various pieces blend together."

=== Accolades ===
Grammy Awards
Year	Category	Work	Result	Ref.
1971	Album of the Year	Chicago	Nominated	
1971	Contemporary Vocal Group	Chicago	Nominated	
1971	Best Album Cover	Chicago (John Berg & Nick Fasciano)	Nominated	

Other honors

- 1970: Chicago, Best Album of 1970, Cash Box
- 1971: Chicago, Best Small-Combo LP, Playboy Jazz & Pop Poll

== Track listing ==
Side one
No.	Title	Writer(s)	Lead vocals	Length
1.	"Movin' In"	James Pankow	Terry Kath	4:06
2.	"The Road"	Kath	Peter Cetera	3:10
3.	"Poem for the People"	Robert Lamm	Lamm; Cetera	4:25
4.	"In the Country"	Kath	Kath; Cetera	6:34

Side two
No.	Title	Writer(s)	Lead vocals	Length
1.	"Wake Up Sunshine"	Lamm	Lamm; Cetera	2:29
2.	"Ballet for a Girl in Buchannon"; 1. "Make Me Smile"; 2. "So Much to Say, So Much to Give"; 3. "Anxiety's Moment"; 4. "West Virginia Fantasies"; 5. "Colour My World"; 6. "To Be Free"; 7. "Now More Than Ever"	Pankow	Kath; Lamm; Instrumental; Instrumental; Kath; Instrumental; Kath	12:55; 3:32; 1:04; 1:00; 1:34; 2:59; 1:21; 1:27

Side three
No.	Title	Writer(s)	Lead vocals	Length
1.	"Fancy Colours"	Lamm	Cetera	5:10
2.	"25 or 6 to 4"	Lamm	Cetera	4:50
3.	"Memories of Love"; 1. "Prelude"; 2. "A.M. Mourning"; 3. "P.M. Mourning"; 4. "Memories of Love"	Kath; Peter Matz; Kath; Matz; Kath; Matz; Kath	Instrumental; Instrumental; Instrumental; Kath	9:12; 1:18; 2:05; 1:59; 4:01

Side four
No.	Title	Writer(s)	Lead vocals	Length
1.	"It Better End Soon"; 1. "1st Movement"; 2. "2nd Movement"; 3. "3rd Movement"; 4. "4th Movement"	Lamm: Lamm; Walter Parazaider; Lamm; Kath; Lamm	Kath; Instrumental; Kath; Kath	10:24; 2:30; 3:47; 3:19; 1:15
2.	"Where Do We Go from Here?"	Cetera	Cetera	2:53

== Personnel ==
=== Chicago ===
- Peter Cetera – bass, vocals
- Terry Kath – guitars, vocals
- Robert Lamm – keyboards, vocals
- Lee Loughnane – trumpet, vocals
- James Pankow – trombone
- Walter Parazaider – saxophone, flute, clarinet, vocals
- Danny Seraphine – drums, percussion

== Production ==
- James William Guercio – producer
- Peter Matz – orchestration on "Prelude"
- Donald Puluse – engineer
- Brian Ross-Myring – engineer
- Chris Hinshaw – engineer
- Nick Fasciano – cover art
- John Berg – cover design
- Herb Greene – photography and poster photos

2002 reissue

- Paul Klingberg – remixing
- John Kellogg – remix producer
- Joe Gastwirt – remastering
- David Wild – liner notes

== Charts ==
Chart (1970)	Position
Australian Albums (Kent Music Report)	5
Canada Top Albums/CDs (RPM)	4
Dutch Albums (Album Top 100)	2
German Albums (Offizielle Top 100)	20
Italian Albums (Musica e Dischi)	8
Japanese Albums (Oricon)	14
Norwegian Albums (VG-lista)	19
UK Albums (Official Charts)	6
US Billboard 200	4

Chart (2025)	Position
Hungarian Physical Albums (MAHASZ)	21

== Certifications ==
Region	Certification	Certified units/sales
Canada (Music Canada)	3× Platinum	300,000^{^}
United States (RIAA)	Platinum	1,000,000^{^}
^{^} Shipments figures based on certification alone.
