= Chicago 18 =

Studio album by Chicago
- Released: September 29, 1986
- Recorded: March–September 1986
- Studios: Chartmaker Studios (Malibu, California); Lion Share Recording Studio (Los Angeles); Skyline Recording Company (Malibu, California)
- Genre: Rock
- Length: 45:19
- Labels: Full Moon; Warner Bros.
- Producer: David Foster

Chicago chronology
Chicago 17 (1984)	Chicago 18 (1986)	Chicago 19 (1988)

Singles from Chicago 18
- 1. "25 or 6 to 4" Released: August 1986 (US); 2. "Will You Still Love Me?" Released: October 24, 1986 (US); 3. "If She Would Have Been Faithful..." Released: March 6, 1987 (US); 4. "Niagara Falls" Released: June 1987

Chicago 18 is the fifteenth studio album, eighteenth overall by the American rock band Chicago, released on September 29, 1986. This album is the first without original vocalist Peter Cetera, and the first to feature Jason Scheff on bass and vocals.

Chicago 18 is the first studio album since the band’s inception to not feature an official guitarist. Studio guitarists such as Steve Lukather (Toto), Michael Landau, and Howard "Buzz" Feiten appear as session musicians for the album.

With Cetera having left the band in mid-1985 for a solo career, Chicago eventually hired Scheff to fill Cetera's position as vocalist and bassist in the fall of 1985. With Scheff and Bill Champlin, who had joined the band in 1981, the most prominent voices in Chicago now belonged to its newest recruits.

Chicago again hired producer David Foster to create a followup to Chicago 17. This would be the final album produced by Foster for the band, before the band would bring in other producers to create future albums.

The band recorded an updated, high-tech remake of their classic "25 or 6 to 4" (#48). This was the first single released from the album in August 1986. Originally, "Does Anybody Really Know What Time It Is?" was destined to be remade for this album instead, ultimately before the band decided that the 1970 hit fit better with what they were planning for this album. Scheff recalled when he asked Foster on the way he should sing the song, the latter responding with: "Just like Cetera."

Alongside the remade "25 or 6 to 4", three other singles were released from 18, "Will You Still Love Me?" (#3) in October 1986, "If She Would Have Been Faithful…" (#17) in March 1987, and "Niagara Falls" (#91) in June 1987.

The album also features a brief instrumental horn riff before "Nothin’s Gonna Stop Us Now", called "Free Flight", composed by trombonist James Pankow.

Despite the success of its predecessor, Chicago 18 ultimately only went gold, peaking at #35 on the Billboard Top 200 charts in March 1987.

== Reception ==
Professional ratings
Review scores
Source	Rating
AllMusic	2/5 stars

Chicago 18 reached gold status and #35 in the US during a chart stay of 45 weeks. It did not chart in the UK.

== Track listing ==
Side one
No.	Title	Writer(s)	Lead vocals	Length
1.	"Niagara Falls"	Steve Kipner/Bobby Caldwell	Scheff with Bill Champlin	3:43
2.	"Forever"	Robert Lamm/Bill Gable	Lamm	5:17
3.	"If She Would Have Been Faithful..."	Kipner/Randy Goodrum	Scheff with Champlin	3:51
4.	"25 or 6 to 4"	Robert Lamm	Scheff	4:20
5.	"Will You Still Love Me?"	David Foster/Tom Keane/Richard Baskin	Scheff with Champlin	5:44

Side two
No.	Title	Writer(s)	Lead vocals	Length
6.	"Over and Over"	Lamm/James Newton Howard/Steve Lukather	Lamm	4:20
7.	"It's Alright"	Bill Champlin/Foster	Champlin	4:29
8.	"Nothin's Gonna Stop Us Now"	Scheff/Buzz Feiten	Scheff	4:45
9.	"I Believe"	Champlin	Champlin, with Scheff	4:20
10.	"One More Day"	Pankow/Carmen Grillo	Lamm, Champlin, Scheff	4:13

Notes:

- A re-recorded version of "When Will the World Be Like Lovers?" (Robert Lamm/Tom Keane/David Foster) appears on Robert Lamm's 1995 solo album Life Is Good In My Neighborhood. The original recorded version from the Chicago 18 sessions also appears online.
- "Free Flight", a 25-second unlisted instrumental composed by James Pankow, appears at the beginning of "Nothin's Gonna Stop Us Now".
- David Boruff plays the saxophone solo on "Forever" instead of Walter Parazaider.

== 18 Tour ==
Between October 1986 and November 1987, the band would embark on an over-100 show tour across North America and Japan. Before this tour, the band would fill in the previously vacant guitarist position with Bob Seger and the Silver Bullet Band guitarist Dawayne Bailey, a position that would be filled until early 1995.

Year	Date	City	State	Venue
1986	October 17	Rockford	Illinois	MetroCentre
1986	October 18	Toledo	Ohio	University of Toledo Centennial Hall
1986	October 19	West Lafayette	Indiana	Purdue University Elliott Hall of Music
1986	October 21	Pittsburgh	Pennsylvania	Civic Arena
1986	October 22	Glens Falls	New York	Civic Center
1986	October 24	Richfield	Ohio	Richfield Coliseum
1986	October 25	Philadelphia	Pennsylvania	Spectrum
1986	October 28	Providence	Rhode Island	Providence Civic Center
1986	October 29	Portland	Maine	Cumberland County Civic Center
1986	October 31	Morgantown	West Virginia	West Virginia University Coliseum
1986	November 1	Baltimore	Maryland	Baltimore Arena
1986	November 2	Norfolk	Virginia	Scope Arena
1986	November 4	Huntsville	Alabama	Von Braun Civic Center
1986	November 5	Knoxville	Tennessee	University of Tennessee Stokely Athletic Center
1986	November 7	Murfreesboro	Tennessee	Middle Tennessee State University Murphy Center
1986	November 8	Lexington	Kentucky	Rupp Arena
1986	November 9	Memphis	Tennessee	Mid-South Coliseum
1986	November 11	Jackson	Mississippi	Mississippi Coliseum
1986	November 12	Lafayette	Louisiana	Cajundome
1986	November 14	Ames	Iowa	James H. Hilton Coliseum
1986	November 15	St. Paul	Minnesota	St. Paul Civic Center
1986	November 17	Springfield	Missouri	Southwest Missouri State University Juanita K. Hammons Hall
1986	November 20	Salt Lake City	Utah	Salt Palace
1986	November 22	Reno	Nevada	Lawlor Events Music Center
1986	November 25	Universal City	California	Universal Amphitheatre
1986	November 26	Universal City	California	Universal Amphitheatre
1986	November 28	Universal City	California	Universal Amphitheatre
1986	November 29	San Diego	California	San Diego Sports Arena
1987	February 9	Moncton	New Brunswick	Moncton Coliseum
1987	February 11	Fredericton	New Brunswick	University of New Brunswick Aitken Centre
1987	February 12	Quebec City	Quebec	Colisée de Québec
1987	February 27	Tulsa	Oklahoma	Mabee Center
1987	February 28	Norman	Oklahoma	Lloyd Noble Center
1987	March 1	Dallas	Texas	Dallas Convention Center Arena
1987	March 3	Houston	Texas	Astrodome (Houston Rodeo & Livestock Show 1987)
1987	March 4	Austin	Texas	University of Texas Frank Erwin Center
1987	March 6	Jacksonville	Florida	Jacksonville Veterans Memorial Coliseum
1987	March 7	Fort Myers	Florida	Lee Civic Center
1987	March 9	Miami	Florida	James L. Knight Center
1987	March 10	Miami	Florida	James L. Knight Center
1987	March 13	Tampa	Florida	University of South Florida Sun Dome
1987	March 14	West Palm Beach	Florida	West Palm Beach Auditorium
1987	March 16	Savannah	Georgia	Savannah Civic Center
1987	March 20	Cullowhee	North Carolina	Ramsey Center
1987	March 21	Pensacola	Florida	Pensacola Civic Center
1987	March 22	Greensboro	North Carolina	Greensboro Coliseum
1987	March 25	Buffalo	New York	Buffalo Memorial Auditorium
1987	March 26	New Haven	Connecticut	New Haven Veterans Memorial Coliseum
1987	March 28	Worcester	Massachusetts	Centrum in Worcester
1987	April 26	Tokyo	Japan	Nippon Budokan
1987	April 27	Tokyo	Japan	Nippon Budokan
1987	April 30	Osaka	Japan	Osaka-jou Hall
1987	May 1	Nagoya	Japan	Nagoya-shi Koukaidou
1987	May 2	Nagoya	Japan	Nagoya-shi Koukaidou
1987	May 3	Yokohama	Japan	Kanagawa Kenmin Hall
1987	May 6	Shizuoka	Japan	Shizuoka Shimin Bunka Kaikan
1987	May 22	Philadelphia	Pennsylvania	Benjamin Franklin Parkway
1987	May 23	Columbia	Maryland	Merriweather Post Pavilion
1987	May 24	Columbia	Maryland	Merriweather Post Pavilion
1987	May 25	Kalamazoo	Michigan	Wings Stadium
1987	May 26	Fort Wayne	Indiana	Allen County War Memorial Coliseum
1987	May 27	Kalamazoo	Michigan	Wings Stadium
1987	May 29	Indianapolis	Indiana	Sports and Music Center
1987	May 30	Clarkston	Michigan	Pine Knob Music Center
1987	May 31	Clarkston	Michigan	Pine Knob Music Center
1987	June 2	Evansville	Indiana	Mesker Music Theatre
1987	June 3	Peoria	Illinois	Peoria Civic Center
1987	June 5	Cuyahoga Falls	Ohio	Blossom Music Center
1987	June 6	Hoffman Estates	Illinois	Poplar Creek Music Theater
1987	June 7	Cincinnati	Ohio	Riverbend Music Center
1987	June 9	Saratoga Springs	New York	Saratoga Performing Arts Center
1987	June 10	Mansfield	Massachusetts	Great Woods Center for the Performing Arts
1987	June 13	Wantagh	New York	Jones Beach Amphitheater
1987	June 14	Holmdel	New Jersey	Garden State Arts Center
1987	June 17	Chattanooga	Tennessee	Ross's Landing
1987	June 26	Memphis	Tennessee	Mud Island Amphitheater
1987	June 27	Chattanooga	Tennessee	Ross's Landing
1987	June 28	Austell	Georgia	Six Flags Over Georgia
1987	June 30	Antioch	Tennessee	Starwood Amphitheater
1987	July 1	St. Louis	Missouri	Forest Park (The Muny)
1987	July 3	Milwaukee	Wisconsin	Marcus Amphitheater
1987	July 4	Charlevoix	Michigan	Castle Farms Music Theater
1987	July 5	Chicago	Illinois	Petrillo Music Shell
1987	July 7	La Crosse	Wisconsin	Mary E. Sawyer Auditorium
1987	July 8	Cedar Rapids	Iowa	Five Seasons Center
1987	July 10	St. Paul	Minnesota	Harriet Island Regional Park
1987	July 11	Omaha	Nebraska	Omaha Civic Auditorium
1987	July 12	Bonner Springs	Kansas	Sandstone Amphitheater
1987	July 14	Morrison	Colorado	Red Rocks Amphitheatre
1987	July 16	Tempe	Arizona	Arizona State University Activity Center
1987	July 17	Irvine	California	Irvine Meadows Amphitheatre
1987	July 18	Mountain View	California	Shoreline Amphitheatre
1987	July 19	Concord	California	Concord Pavilion
1987	July 21	Chico	California	Silver Dollar Fairgrounds Silver Amphitheatre
1987	August 23	Springfield	Illinois	Illinois State Fairgrounds Grandstand
1987	August 24	Des Moines	Iowa	Iowa State Fairgrounds Grandstand
1987	August 26	Ottawa	Ontario	Grandstand at Lansdowne Park
1987	August 28	Toledo	Ohio	Toledo Zoo Amphitheater
1987	September 1	Montreal	Quebec	La Ronde
1987	September 2	Syracuse	New York	New York State Fairgrounds Grandstand
1987	September 4	Toronto	Ontario	Canadian National Exhibition
1987	September 5	Allentown	Pennsylvania	Allentown Fairgrounds Grandstand
1987	September 6	Toronto	Ontario	CNE Grandstand
1987	September 13	York	New York	York Fair Grandstand
1987	September 16	Monroe	Louisiana	Northeast Louisiana University Ewing Coliseum
1987	September 18	Topeka	Kansas	Kansas ExpoCentre (5:30pm Show)
1987	September 18	Topeka	Kansas	Kansas ExpoCentre (8:30pm Show)
~~1987~~	~~September 21~~	~~Arlington~~	~~Texas~~	~~Six Flags Over Texas~~
1987	September 22	Houston	Texas	The Summit
1987	September 25	South Bend	Indiana	University of Notre Dame Joyce Center
1987	September 27	Waterloo	Iowa	McElroy Auditorium
1987	November 24	Universal City	California	Universal Amphitheatre

== Personnel ==
=== Chicago ===
- Bill Champlin – keyboards, vocals
- Robert Lamm – keyboards, vocals
- Lee Loughnane – trumpet
- James Pankow – trombone, brass arrangements
- Walter Parazaider – woodwinds
- Jason Scheff – bass, vocals
- Danny Seraphine – drums, drum programming
- Vocal arrangements by Chicago, Bill Champlin, and David Foster

=== Additional musicians ===
- David Foster – keyboards, additional arrangements, brass contributions
- Tom Keane – keyboards, backing vocals
- Michael Boddicker – synthesizer programming
- David Boruff – synthesizer programming, tenor saxophone on "Forever"
- Rhett Lawrence – synthesizer programming
- Bo Tomlyn – synthesizer programming
- Michael Landau – guitars
- Howard "Buzz" Feiten – guitars
- Steve Lukather – guitars
- Jeremy Lubbock – string arrangements on "If She Would Have Been Faithful...", "Will You Still Love Me?", and "I Believe"
- Jules Chaikin – string contractor
- Gerald Vinci – concertmaster
- Betty Joyce – kids choir contractor on "One More Day"
- Jon Joyce – kids choir conductor on "One More Day"
- Rebecca Clinger, Christopher Leach, Julie Leach, Myhanh Tran, Peter Wade, Jason Pasol, Brandon Roberts, Alitzah Wiener, Betty Joyce, Laurie Parazaider, Felicia Parazaider, Melody Wright and Bettina Bush – kids choir on "One More Day"

== Production ==
- Produced by David Foster
- Engineered and Mixed by Humberto Gatica
- Recorded at Chartmaker Studios (Malibu, CA) and Lion Share Recording Studio (Los Angeles, CA), assisted by Claudio Ordenes and Ray Pyle.
- Horn Sessions recorded at Skyline Recording Company (Malibu, CA), assisted by Britt Bacon and David Garfield.
- Mixed at Lion Share Recording Studio, assisted by Laura Livingston.
- Originally mastered by George Marino at Sterling Sound (New York, NY).
- CDD Pre-mastering by WCI Record Group
- Art Direction – Jeffrey Kent Ayeroff
- Design – Hugh Brown and Jeri McManus
- Album Cover (Mosaic) – Maria Sarno
- Photography – Hugh Brown
- Stylist/Wardrobe – Kali Korn
- Group Photography – Guy Webster

== Charts ==
Chart performance for Chicago 18
Chart (1986–1987)	Peak position
Canada Top Albums/CDs (RPM)	53
Finnish Albums (The Official Finnish Charts)	31
German Albums (Offizielle Top 100)	49
Japanese Albums (Oricon)	23
Norwegian Albums (VG-lista)	12
Swedish Albums (Sverigetopplistan)	15
Swiss Albums (Schweizer Hitparade)	18
US Billboard 200	35

== Certifications ==
Certifications for Chicago 18
Region	Certification	Certified units/sales
United States (RIAA)	Gold	500,000^{^}
^{^} Shipments figures based on certification alone.
