= Will You Still Love Me? (song) =

Single by Chicago

from the album Chicago 18
- B-side: "25 or 6 to 4" (1986 version)
- Released: October 24, 1986 (US)
- Recorded: 1986
- Genre: Rock
- Length: 5:44 (album version); 4:14 (7" version/radio edit)
- Label: Full Moon; Warner Bros.
- Songwriters: David Foster; Tom Keane; Richard Baskin
- Producer: David Foster

Chicago singles chronology
"25 or 6 to 4"/"One More Day" (1986)	"Will You Still Love Me?" (1986)	"If She Would Have Been Faithful..." (1987)

"Will You Still Love Me?" is a song recorded by the American rock band Chicago for their studio album Chicago 18 (1986). The song was written by David Foster, Tom Keane and Richard Baskin.

The second single released from the Chicago 18 album, "Will You Still Love Me?" reached number three on the US Billboard Hot 100 and number two on the US Adult Contemporary chart. The song also reached number three on the US Cash Box Top 100 chart.

== Background ==
The song was Chicago's first top-ten hit following the departure of Peter Cetera, and it featured Jason Scheff on lead vocals. Upon the single’s release, Cashbox called the song's harmonies and arrangement "well-crafted". Ken Ross and Richard Levine directed the song's music video, which featured performance clips of the band in a factory.

== Charts ==
=== Weekly charts ===
Chart (1986–1987)	Peak position
Canada Top Singles (RPM)	6
US Billboard Hot 100	3
US Adult Contemporary (Billboard)	2
US Cash Box Top 100	4

=== Year-end charts ===
Chart (1987)	Position
US Billboard Hot 100	50
US Cash Box Top 100	24

== Cover versions ==
In 2003, jazz group Urban Knights covered the song with vocals by Michelle Williams.
