= Chicago 17 =

Studio album by Chicago
- Released: May 14, 1984
- Recorded: Mid 1983 – early 1984
- Studios: The Lighthouse (North Hollywood); Sunset Sound (Hollywood); The Record Plant (Los Angeles)
- Genres: Soft rock; pop rock
- Length: 41:53
- Labels: Full Moon; Warner Bros.
- Producer: David Foster

Chicago chronology
Chicago 16 (1982)	Chicago 17 (1984)	Chicago 18 (1986)

Singles from Chicago 17
- 1. "Stay the Night" Released: April 18, 1984; 2. "Hard Habit to Break" Released: July 18, 1984; 3. "You're the Inspiration" Released: October 29, 1984; 4. "Along Comes a Woman" Released: February 11, 1985

Professional ratings
Review scores
Source	Rating
AllMusic	4.5/5 stars

Chicago 17 is the fourteenth studio album, seventeenth overall by American rock band Chicago, released on May 14, 1984. It was the group's second release for Full Moon/Warner Bros. Records, their second album to be produced by David Foster and their last with founding bassist/vocalist Peter Cetera. As of 2023, it remains Chicago's best-selling album, with over 6.1 million copies being sold in the United States, the United Kingdom, and Japan. Four singles were released from the album, all of which peaked in the top 20 on the Billboard Hot 100 chart. Chicago 17 achieved an RIAA certification of six times platinum.

In 1985, the album received three Grammy Awards. David Foster won for Producer of the Year, Non-Classical (tied in this category with Lionel Richie and James Anthony Carmichael), Humberto Gatica won for Best Engineered Recording – Non-Classical, and David Foster and Jeremy Lubbock won for Best Instrumental Arrangement Accompanying Vocal(s) for "Hard Habit to Break" which was also nominated for Record of the Year, Best Pop Performance by a Duo or Group With Vocals and Best Vocal Arrangement for Two or More Voices. In his review of the album for AllMusic, music critic Stephen Thomas Erlewine says Chicago 17 is "the pinnacle of [producer David Foster's] craft and one of the best adult contemporary records of the '80s," and one of the most influential albums "within its style." Writing for Billboard, Bobby Olivier said the album "is one of the greatest pure power ballad albums of all time — or at least from 1984 — and "[Hard] Habit [to Break]" is one of the finest entries."

== Artwork, packaging ==
In keeping with the majority of their albums up to that time, the traditional "Chicago" logo, designed by John Berg and Nick Fasciano, is the main feature of the album cover. It does not feature any photos of the group. In a 2020 article for Muse by Clio, it was listed among "Nine Great Album Covers, Chosen by Gregory Sylvester." Sylvester describes the cover as, " ... an illusion of a package within a package ... brown kraft paper, twine and a faux red stamp." The album cover looks like a package wrapped in brown paper tied with twine and (on the back) secured with tape. On the front, the "Chicago" logo appears to be in bas-relief (it is not), covered by the wrapping paper. The number "17," in Arabic numerals rather than the Roman numerals used by the group formerly, appears to be stamped on the wrapping paper below the logo. In the upper left-hand quadrant of the cover back, a pink "receipt form" is depicted (designated as a "TOPS FORM 3014" in small print at the bottom of the "receipt"), tucked underneath the "twine," with the "Chicago" logo stamped on it near the top in purple ink and, below the logo, a "DESCRIPTION OF PACKAGE" lists the tracks on side one and side two. The bottom of the "receipt form" shows production and engineering credits and the Warner Bros. logo "stamped" on the slip. On the inner dust sleeve, a large group photo of the band appears on one side: (back row, left to right) Lee Loughnane, Bill Champlin, James Pankow, Walt Parazaider, Robert Lamm, (front row, left to right) Danny Seraphine, Peter Cetera. The reverse side of the dust sleeve gives track listings, song lyrics, and song and album credits, including credits for artwork and packaging: Art Direction/Design, Simon Levy; Album Cover Art, Larry Vigon; Photography, Harry Langdon, James Goble.

== Additional Notes ==
Peter Cetera's brother, Kenny Cetera, provided background vocals on the album. In an interview, Kenny specified on which recorded songs his vocals appear: "Stay the Night", "Along Comes a Woman", "You're the Inspiration", and "Prima Donna". He also performed live with the band during the 17 tour, providing percussion and high harmonies.

Some songs were recorded during the Chicago 17 sessions but not released. "Good for Nothing" was later released on the We Are the World superstar charity album in 1985. This is the last released Chicago song to feature Peter Cetera on vocals.

A song called "Sweet Marie" recorded during sessions for the Chicago 17 album has been performed by the Norwegian band TOBB. Bill Champlin offered this song to the band. It was released on May 14, 2014, by TOBB, the 30th anniversary of the Chicago 17 album's release. It was performed by Chicago on rare occasions in 1984, and has surfaced online from VHS recordings of some of their performances.

A subsequent international release in 2010 (included in the Studio Albums 1979 - 2008 boxed set from 2015) has the original album restored, with additional bonus tracks of alternate versions of "Only You", "You're the Inspiration", and "Prima Donna" as well as "Here Is Where We Begin". A demo version of "Hard Habit to Break" exists with Robert Lamm on vocals, as briefly heard during the documentary Now More Than Ever: The History of Chicago..

In 2006, Rhino Entertainment remastered and reissued the album, using the original analog versions of "Please Hold On" (which was co-written with Lionel Richie who was enjoying success from his album Can't Slow Down) and "Prima Donna" and adding a Robert Lamm demo, "Here Is Where We Begin" as a bonus track.

== Track listing ==
Side one
No.	Title	Writer(s)	Lead vocals	Length
1.	"Stay the Night"	Peter Cetera, David Foster	Peter Cetera	3:48
2.	"We Can Stop the Hurtin'"	Bill Champlin, Robert Lamm, Deborah Neal	Robert Lamm	4:11
3.	"Hard Habit to Break"	Steve Kipner, John Lewis Parker	Cetera with Bill Champlin	4:43
4.	"Only You"	Foster, James Pankow	Lamm with Champlin	3:53
5.	"Remember the Feeling"	Cetera, Champlin	Cetera	4:28

Side two
No.	Title	Writer(s)	Lead vocals	Length
6.	"Along Comes a Woman"	Cetera, Mark Goldenberg	Cetera	4:14
7.	"You're the Inspiration"	Cetera, Foster	Cetera	3:49
8.	"Please Hold On"	Champlin, Foster, Lionel Richie	Champlin	3:37
9.	"Prima Donna"	Cetera, Goldenberg	Cetera	4:09
10.	"Once in a Lifetime"	Pankow	Champlin with Cetera	4:12
Total length:				41:53

2006 reissue bonus track
No.	Title	Writer(s)	Lead vocals	Length
11.	"Here Is Where We Begin" (featuring David Pack)	Lamm	Lamm with David Pack	3:53

Unreleased
No.	Title	Writer(s)	Lead vocals	Length
11.	"Sweet Marie"	Cetera, Foster	Champlin

== Personnel ==
All information in this section from except as noted.

Chicago

- Peter Cetera – lead and backing vocals, bass guitar (1), arrangements (1, 6, 7, 9), vocal arrangements (5)
- Bill Champlin – keyboards, guitars, lead and backing vocals, vocal arrangements (4)
- Robert Lamm – keyboards, lead and backing vocals, arrangements (2), vocal arrangements (4)
- Lee Loughnane – trumpet
- James Pankow – trombone, horn arrangements (2, 4, 6, 8, 10), arrangements (10)
- Walter Parazaider – woodwinds
- Chris Pinnick – guitars
- Danny Seraphine – drums (except track 1, 7, & 8)

Additional personnel

- David Foster – keyboards, synthesizer programming, additional arrangements, arrangements (1–5, 7, 8, 10), synth basses (2–10), horn arrangements (4)
- Erich Bulling – synthesizer programming
- Marcus Ryle – synthesizer programming
- John Van Tongeren – synthesizer programming
- Mark Goldenberg – guitars, arrangements (6, 9)
- Paul Jackson Jr. – guitars
- Michael Landau – guitars
- Jeff Porcaro – drums (uncredited) (1)
- Carlos Vega – drums (uncredited) (7)
- John Robinson – drums (uncredited) (8)
- Paulinho da Costa – percussion
- Greg Adams – trumpet
- Gary Grant – trumpet
- Jeremy Lubbock – string arrangements (3, 5, 7, 10)
- Jules Chaikin – string contractor (3, 5, 7, 10)
- Gerald Vinci – concertmaster (3, 5, 7, 10)
- Kenny Cetera – backing vocals (1, 6, 7, 9)
- Donny Osmond – backing vocals (2)
- Richard Marx – backing vocals (2)
- David Pack – vocal harmony and bridge vocal improvs on "Here Is Where We Begin"

Production

- David Foster – producer
- Humberto Gatica – engineer, mixing
- Terry Christian – assistant engineer
- Eddie Delena – assistant engineer
- Laura Livingston – assistant engineer
- Larry Fergusson – mix assistant, additional overdubs
- Paul Lani – additional overdubs
- Simon Levy – art direction, design
- Larry Vigon – album cover art
- James Goble – photography
- Harry Langdon – photography
- Recorded at The Lighthouse (North Hollywood, CA); Sunset Sound (Hollywood, CA); Record Plant (Los Angeles, CA).
- Mixed at Lion Share Recording Studio (Los Angeles, CA).

Production for 2006 reissue

- Jeff Magid – project supervision, mixing (bonus selections)
- David Donnelly – mixing (bonus selections), remastering
- Cory Frye – editorial supervision
- Greg Allen – art direction, design
- Karen LeBlanc – project assistance
- Steve Woolard – project assistance
- Mixed at DNA Studio (Studio City, California)
- Mastered at DNA Mastering (Studio City, California)

== Charts ==
=== Weekly charts ===
Weekly chart performance for Chicago 17
Chart (1984–1985)	Peak position
Australian Albums (Kent Music Report)	65
Canada Top Albums/CDs (RPM)	4
Dutch Albums (Album Top 100)	20
French Albums (IFOP)	23
German Albums (Offizielle Top 100)	12
Japanese Albums (Oricon)	15
New Zealand Albums (RMNZ)	25
Norwegian Albums (VG-lista)	14
Swedish Albums (Sverigetopplistan)	1
Swiss Albums (Schweizer Hitparade)	6
UK Albums (Official Charts)	24
US Billboard 200	4

=== Year-end charts ===
Year-end chart performance for Chicago 17
Chart (1984)	Peak position
Canada Top Albums/CDs (RPM)	15
French Albums (IFOP)	33
German Albums (Offizielle Top 100)	61
Swiss Albums (Schweizer Hitparade)	20
US Billboard 200	62

Chart (1985)	Peak position
US Billboard 200	21

== Certifications ==
Certifications and sales for Chicago 17
Region	Certification	Certified units/sales
Switzerland (IFPI Switzerland)	Gold	25,000^{^}
United Kingdom (BPI)	Gold	100,000^{^}
United States (RIAA)	6× Platinum	6,000,000^{^}
^{^} Shipments figures based on certification alone.
