= Hard Habit to Break =

Single by Chicago

from the album Chicago 17
- B-side: "Remember the Feeling"
- Released: July 18, 1984
- Genre: Soft rock
- Length: 4:43
- Label: Full Moon; Warner Bros.
- Songwriters: Steve Kipner; John Lewis Parker
- Producer: David Foster

Chicago singles chronology
"Stay the Night" (1984)	"Hard Habit to Break" (1984)	"You're the Inspiration" (1984)

"Hard Habit to Break" is a song written by Steve Kipner and John Lewis Parker, produced and arranged by David Foster and recorded by the group Chicago for their 1984 album Chicago 17, with Bill Champlin and Peter Cetera sharing lead vocals. Released as the second single from the album, it reached No. 3 on the US Billboard Hot 100 and Billboard Adult Contemporary charts. Worldwide, it entered the top 10 in Canada, Guatemala, Ireland, and the United Kingdom.

In a 2024 interview, Vinnie Colaiuta asked Foster, "What were some of the most memorable things that you've done, production-wise, that you're really, really proud of?" Foster responded that "Hard Habit to Break" was, in his opinion, "The most perfect record, or close to perfect, that I produced."

The song's title was used as the slogan for Demon Dogs, a hot dog stand owned by the band's manager Peter Schivarelli which was located in the area of DePaul University's Lincoln Park campus.

== Critical reception ==
Reviewing the single upon its release, Billboard called the song "a bit complicated, with its shifts from acoustic to electric to orchestrated." "Hard Habit to Break" was nominated for four Grammy Awards: Foster and Jeremy Lubbock won the award for Best Instrumental Arrangement Accompanying Vocal(s); Chicago were nominated for the song in the categories Record of the Year and Best Pop Performance by a Duo or Group with Vocal; and Cetera and Foster were nominated for Best Vocal Arrangement for Two or More Voices. Songwriters Kipner and Parker won an ASCAP award in 1986 for most-performed song.

== Charts ==
=== Weekly charts ===
Chart (1984)	Peak position
Canada Top Singles (RPM)	5
Canada Adult Contemporary (RPM)	1
Guatemala (UPI)	9
Ireland (IRMA)	3
New Zealand (Recorded Music NZ)	17
UK Singles (Official Charts)	8
US Billboard Hot 100	3
US Adult Contemporary (Billboard)	3

=== Year-end charts ===
Chart (1984)	Position
Canada Top Singles (RPM)	52
US Billboard Hot 100	45

== Cover versions ==
Puerto Rican singer Glenn Monroig recorded a Spanish-language cover version entitled "El Vicio Que No Puedo Romper" for his album Apasionado (1986). All-4-One recorded a cover version for their compilation album Greatest Hits (2004).
