= Make Me Smile =

Single by Chicago

from the album Chicago
- B-side: "Colour My World"
- Released: March 17, 1970
- Recorded: August 1969
- Genre: Rock; soft rock
- Length: 2:58 (Original single edit); 3:32 (Album version); 4:25 (Only the Beginning edit)
- Label: Columbia
- Songwriter: James Pankow
- Producer: James William Guercio

Chicago singles chronology
"I’m a Man" (1970)	"Make Me Smile" (1970)	"25 or 6 to 4" (1970)

"Make Me Smile" is a song written by James Pankow for the rock band Chicago with the band's guitarist, Terry Kath, on lead vocals. Part 1 of Pankow's 7-part "Ballet for a Girl in Buchannon" song cycle/suite, it was recorded for their second album, Chicago (often called Chicago II), which was released in 1970. The song "Now More Than Ever", a separate track from the same song suite, serves as a reprise of the song and appears edited together with it on many later versions, including a single edit, on several greatest hits collections, and in many live performances.

== Background ==
A radio-friendly edit of "Make Me Smile" was released as a single in March 1970, becoming the band's first Top 10 record, peaking at number nine on the U.S. Billboard Hot 100 chart. Pulled from the first movement of the "Ballet for a Girl in Buchannon" suite, several changes were made in order to make the song more suitable for radio. This included a modified introduction and abbreviated guitar solo. Finally, parts of the track "Now More Than Ever" were appended on the end to make a complete, 3-verse song.

Reviewing the single, Cash Box said that "just a grand song to glide along with, the new Chicago offering comes up with even more audience-shattering magnetism than their two earlier singles" and noted the "brisk motion and a fine instrumental styling." Billboard called it a "solid beat rocker" that's "a mover from start to finish, loaded with discotheque appeal." Record World said that the song was "very happening."

When Chicago released their compilation album The Very Best of Chicago: Only the Beginning in 2002, they featured a new edit of the song, with the "Make Me Smile" and "Now More Than Ever" parts segued together again, but without the numerous cuts—the full intro and the guitar solo of the former part, and the full outro of the latter part, were thus included.

"Make Me Smile" was the group's breakthrough hit, in that its success triggered renewed interest in the group's two prior releases from 1969 which had previously failed to reach the U.S. Top 40. "Questions 67 and 68" had reached #71 that year, but on re-release in 1971 reached #24. And "Beginnings" had failed to chart in 1969, but on re-release in 1971 reached number seven on the Pop chart and #1 on the Easy Listening chart.

Following the death of Terry Kath in 1978, the vocals for live performances of "Make Me Smile" were handled by Bill Champlin from 1981 until his departure in 2009, with Lou Pardini taking over performances of the song until his departure in 2022, followed by Robert Lamm until his retirement from touring in 2025. Currently, the song is performed by bassist Eric Baines or vocalist Rudy Cardenas. Other members that have occasionally performed lead vocals for the song include Jason Scheff, Jeff Coffey, and Neil Donell.

== Personnel ==
- Terry Kath – lead vocals, electric guitar
- Robert Lamm – acoustic piano, backing vocals
- Peter Cetera – bass, backing vocals
- Danny Seraphine – drums, tambourine, maracas
- Jimmy Pankow – trombone
- Lee Loughnane – trumpet
- Walt Parazaider – tenor saxophone

== Chart performance ==
=== Weekly charts ===
Chart (1970)	Peak position
Australia Kent Music Report	33
Canada RPM Top Singles	11
France (IFOP)	24
U.S. Billboard Hot 100	9
U.S. Cash Box Top 100	11

=== Year-end charts ===
Chart (1970)	Rank
Australia	164
U.S. Billboard Hot 100	59
U.S. Cash Box	60

== In popular culture ==
"Make Me Smile" was made available for download on October 23, 2012 for Rock Band 3 Basic and PRO mode for use with real guitar/bass guitar, and MIDI-compatible electronic drum kits/keyboards, but as its new edit from The Very Best of Chicago: Only the Beginning.
