= 25 or 6 to 4 =

1970 single by Chicago

Single by Chicago

from the album Chicago
- B-side: "Where Do We Go from Here"
- Released: June 12, 1970
- Recorded: July 24, 1969
- Genre: Hard rock; jazz rock
- Length: 4:50 (album version); 2:52 (single version)
- Label: Columbia
- Songwriter: Robert Lamm
- Producer: James William Guercio

Chicago singles chronology
"Make Me Smile" (1970)	"25 or 6 to 4" (1970)	"Does Anybody Really Know What Time It Is?" (1970)

Audio sample
- file; help

"25 or 6 to 4" is a song written by American musician Robert Lamm, one of the founding members of the band Chicago. It was recorded in July 1969 for their second album, Chicago, with Peter Cetera on lead vocals. Columbia Records released the song as a single in June 1970.

"25 or 6 to 4" peaked at number 4 on the Billboard Hot 100 and number 6 on the Cash Box Top 100 charts.

== Composition ==
In a 2013 interview, Robert Lamm said he composed "25 or 6 to 4" on a 12-string guitar with only 10 strings. According to Lamm, "It didn't have the two low Es." He wrote the lyrics in one day. The band first rehearsed the song at the Whisky a Go Go.

Lamm said the song is about trying to write a song in the middle of the night. The song's title is the time at which the song is set: 25 or 26 minutes before 4 a.m., phrased as, "twenty-five or [twenty-]six [minutes] to four [o’clock]," (i.e. 03:35 or 03:34). Because of the unique phrasing of the song's title, "25 or 6 to 4" has been interpreted to mean everything from a quantity of illicit drugs to the name of a famous person in code.

The song's opening guitar riff has been compared to chord progressions and riffs in other songs. In the opinion of writer Melissa Locker:

...the opening guitar riff from Green Day's "Brain Stew" bears a striking similarity to the opening stanza of Chicago’s "25 or 6 to 4."

LA Weekly's music editor, Andy Hermann, names it "The Riff" and describes it as follows:

It's a descending five-chord pattern, typically played as power chords over four bars, with the last two chords sharing the last bar. The most common variant of it goes from A minor to G to F sharp to F to E, although it can also be played as Am-G-D-F-E or even Am-G-D9-F♯-F-E...

Hermann details the riff's similarity to the chord progression in Led Zeppelin's version of "Babe I'm Gonna Leave You" by Anne Bredon, which came out a year before "25 or 6 to 4", and the similarity of that chord progression to one in George Harrison's song "While My Guitar Gently Weeps", which came out even earlier. He labels "Brain Stew", released in 1996, as "derivative" by comparison to "25 or 6 to 4".

== Original version ==
The original recording features an electric guitar solo using a wah-wah pedal by Chicago guitarist Terry Kath, and a lead vocal line in the Aeolian mode.

According to the recollections of producer James William Guercio and horn player Lee Loughnane, Cetera had to record the vocal while his jaw was still wired together after he had been attacked at a baseball game at Dodger Stadium on May 20, 1969. Guercio said he told Cetera, "I can't wait, we're gonna do this."

The album was released in January 1970 and the song was edited and released as a single in June (omitting the second verse and most of the guitar solo), climbing to number 4 on the US Billboard Hot 100 chart and number 7 on the UK Singles Chart. It was the band's first song to reach the top five in the US. It has been included in numerous Chicago compilation albums. In 2015, Dave Swanson, writing for Ultimate Classic Rock, listed the song as number one on his top ten list of Chicago songs. Classic Rock Review says the song is "one of the most indelible Chicago tunes". In 2019, Bobby Olivier and Andrew Unterberger, music critics for Billboard magazine, ranked the song number one on their list of "The 50 Best Chicago Songs". Guitar World rated "25 or 6 to 4" as No. 22 for "greatest wah solos of all time."

=== Bans ===
The song was banned in Singapore in 1970 due to "alleged allusions to drugs"; the ban extended to later albums that included the song, such as Chicago 18. In 1993, the ban on this song was lifted, along with long-time bans on songs by other artists such as The Beatles, Bob Dylan and Creedence Clearwater Revival.

== 1986 and later versions ==
"25 or 6 to 4"

Single by Chicago

from the album Chicago 18
- A-side: "Will You Still Love Me?"
- B-side: "One More Day"
- Released: August 1986
- Recorded: 1986
- Genre: Hard rock; jazz rock
- Length: 4:20
- Label: Full Moon; Warner Bros.
- Songwriters: Robert Lamm; James Pankow
- Producer: David Foster

Chicago singles chronology
"Along Comes a Woman" (1985)	"25 or 6 to 4" (1986)	"Will You Still Love Me?" (1986)

An updated version of "25 or 6 to 4" was recorded for the 1986 album Chicago 18 with James Pankow listed as co-writer, and new band member Jason Scheff on lead vocals. It featured two verses instead of three, and the single reached number 48 on the US chart. This version was also used as the B-side for the band's next single in 1986, "Will You Still Love Me?"

Through the 2010s, "25 or 6 to 4" continued to be a staple in Chicago's live concert set list and in Peter Cetera's solo concert set list. In 2016, the group's former drummer Danny Seraphine reunited on stage with Chicago to perform "25 or 6 to 4" and two other songs for their induction ceremony at the Rock and Roll Hall of Fame.

== Music video ==
In 1987, the music video for the 1986 remake won an American Video Award, in the "Best Cinematography" category, for Bobby Byrne.

== Personnel ==
- Peter Cetera – lead vocals, bass
- Terry Kath – guitars, backing vocals
- Robert Lamm – acoustic piano, backing vocals
- Danny Seraphine – drums
- James Pankow – trombone
- Lee Loughnane – trumpet
- Walt Parazaider – tenor saxophone

== Chart performance ==
=== Weekly charts ===
Original version

Chart (1969–1970)	Peak position
Australia	12
Belgium (Ultratop 50 Flanders)	25
Belgium (Ultratop 50 Wallonia)	18
Canada Top Singles (RPM)	2
France (IFOP)	3
Germany (Chartsurfer)	22
Ireland (IRMA)	13
Netherlands (Single Top 100)	8
Norway (VG-lista)	6
UK Singles (Official Charts)	7
US Billboard Hot 100	4
US Cash Box Top 100	6

1986 re-recording

Chart (1986)	Peak position
US Billboard Hot 100	48
US Cash Box Top 100	46

=== Year-end charts ===
Chart (1970)	Rank
Australia	74
Canada	29
Netherlands	98
US Billboard Hot 100	61

== Covers and parodies ==
The song has been covered by various artists, including Straitjacket, Local H, Intruder, Bruce Foxton, The Moog Cookbook, Earth, Wind & Fire, Paul Gilbert, Pacifika, Mötley Crüe lead singer Vince Neil, Umphrey's McGee, Nick Ingman, and as an instrumental on the Dave Koz collaboration album Summer Horns. In 2011, Constantine Maroulis released his version of the song as a single.

== In popular culture ==
"25 or 6 to 4" has become a popular song for marching bands to play. In 2018, Kevin Coffey of the Omaha World-Herald named it as the number one "marching band song of all time". As performed by the Jackson State University marching band, the HBCU Sports website ranked it number seven of the "Top 20 Cover Songs of 2018 by HBCU Bands". In a nod to its popularity with marching bands, Chicago performed "25 or 6 to 4" and "Saturday in the Park" with the Notre Dame Marching Band on the football field during halftime on October 21, 2017.

The song has been used in popular media as well. It appears as an on-disc track in the video game Rock Band 3; has been featured on the animated TV series King of the Hill's season 11 episode, "Luanne Gets Lucky"; and was used in the 2017 film I, Tonya, directed by Craig Gillespie and starring Margot Robbie and Sebastian Stan.

The song was used in the 2023 film The Flash to introduce the older, alternate version of Bruce Wayne, played by Michael Keaton.

== Influence ==
Jason Newsted, former bassist of Metallica, said that this song was the first rock or metal riff he ever learned to play. Paul Gilbert, former guitarist of Racer X and Mr. Big, said that a "really primitive version" of "25 or 6 to 4" was one of the first songs he taught himself to play on the guitar, using one string.
