= Anthology (The Babys album) =

Compilation album by the Babys
- Released: October 1981
- Genre: Rock
- Length: 33:57
- Labels: 1981: Chrysalis Records; 2000 re-issue: Capitol Records
- Producers: Keith Olsen, Ron Nevison, Brian Christian and Bob Ezrin

The Babys chronology
On the Edge (1980)	Anthology (1981)

Professional ratings
Review scores
Source	Rating
Allmusic	3.0/5 stars

Anthology is a greatest hits collection of the Babys, spanning the years 1976–1980. Originally released in 1981 on Chrysalis Records, it was remastered and reissued with bonus tracks on Capitol Records in 2000. The album charted at number 138 on the Billboard 200.

The song "Money" had not appeared on any Babys album.

== Track listing ==
Original 1981 release
No.	Title	Writer(s)	Length
1.	"Head First"	John Waite; Wally Stocker; Tony Brock	3:57
2.	"Isn't It Time"	Ray Kennedy; Jack Conrad	4:03
3.	"Midnight Rendezvous"	Waite; Jonathan Cain	3:36
4.	"Money (That's What I Want)"	Berry Gordy, Jr.; Janie Bradford	2:56
5.	"Back On My Feet Again"	Waite; Dominic Bugatti; Frank Musker	3:18
6.	"Give Me Your Love"	Waite; Stocker; Brock; Michael Corby	3:37
7.	"Turn and Walk Away"	Waite; Cain	3:10
8.	"Every Time I Think of You"	Kennedy; Conrad	4:00
9.	"If You've Got the Time"	Waite; Brock; Corby; Stocker	2:33
10.	"Sweet 17"	Waite; Cain; Stocker	2:47
Total length:			33:57

2000 re-issue
No.	Title	Writer(s)	Length
1.	"If You've Got the Time"	Waite; Brock; Corby; Stocker	2:33
2.	"Head Above the Waves"	Waite	2:52
3.	"I Love How You Love Me"	Barry Mann; Larry Kolber	2:21
4.	"Looking for Love (Live)"	Waite; Brock; Corby; Stocker	4:43
5.	"Isn't It Time"	Kennedy; Conrad	4:03
6.	"Give Me Your Love"	Waite; Brock; Corby; Stocker	3:37
7.	"Silver Dreams"	Waite; Brock	3:00
8.	"Money (That's What I Want)"	Gordy; Bradford	2:56
9.	"Every Time I Think of You"	Kennedy; Conrad	4:00
10.	"Head First"	Waite; Stocker; Brock	3:57
11.	"Love Don't Prove I'm Right"	Waite; Stocker; Brock	2:47
12.	"Back on My Feet Again"	Waite; Bugatti; Musker	3:18
13.	"Midnight Rendezvous"	Waite; Cain	3:36
14.	"Anytime"	Waite; Brock; Ricky Phillips; Stocker; Cain	3:21
15.	"Turn and Walk Away"	Waite; Cain	3:10
16.	"Sweet 17"	Waite; Stocker; Cain	2:47
17.	"Gonna Be Somebody"	Waite; Brock; Cain	2:57
Total length:			55:58

== Personnel ==
From 1985 Chrysalis VK 41351 CD liner notes

=== Group ===
- John Waite – vocals, bass (1,2,4,6,8,9)
- Wally Stocker – lead guitar, rhythm guitar (7,10)
- Tony Brock – drums, percussion (1,4)
- Michael Corby – rhythm guitar (2,6,9), keyboards (2,6,9)
- Ricky Phillips - bass (3,5,7,10)
- Jonathan Cain - keyboards (3,5,7,10), rhythm guitar (7,10), vocals (7,10)

=== Additional musicians ===
- Michael Corby - rhythm guitar, keyboards - "Money"
- Jack Conrad - bass - "Everytime I Think Of You"
- Kevin Kelley - piano - "Everytime I Think Of You"

=== Background vocals ===
- The Babettes (Lisa Freeman Roberts, Pat Henderson, Myrna Mathews) - "Isn't It Time"
- Anne Marie Leclerc - "Turn And Walk Away", "Sweet 17"
- Marti McCall, Myrna Mathews, Diana Lee - "Everytime I Think Of You"

=== Production ===
- Ron Nevison (1,2,4,6,8)
- Brian Christian, Bob Ezrin - "If You've Got The Time"
- Keith Olsen - (3,5,7,10)
- Greg Fulginiti original mastering

Strings and horns arranged and conducted by Jimmy Haskell - "Everytime I Think Of You"
