= In the Line of Fire (Robin Trower album) =

Studio album by Robin Trower
- Released: 1990
- Studio: Dreamland (Hurley, New York)
- Genre: Rock, blues rock
- Length: 45:16
- Label: Atlantic
- Producer: Eddie Kramer

Robin Trower chronology
Take What You Need (1988)	In the Line of Fire (1990)	20th Century Blues (1994)

Professional ratings
Review scores
Source	Rating
AllMusic	2/5 stars

In the Line of Fire is the twelfth (solo) studio album by Robin Trower, and the third to feature Davey Pattison on lead vocals.

The song "Isn't It Time" was originally recorded by the English group The Babys in 1977 and released on their album Broken Heart. The front cover captures Trower at Cherry Street, Two Bridges, Manhattan, New York City.

== Track listing ==
No.	Title	Music	Length
1.	"Sea of Love"	Robin Trower	4:02
2.	"Under the Gun"	Matt Noble, Keith Reid	3:54
3.	"Turn the Volume Up"	Trower, Matt Noble, Keith Reid	3:48
4.	"Natural Fact"	Trower	4:44
5.	"If You Really Want to Find Love"	Trower	4:25
6.	"Ev'ry Body's Watching You Now"	Trower, Dave Bronze	4:28
7.	"Isn't It Time"	Jack Conrad, Ray Kennedy	3:27
8.	"(I Would) Still Be Here for You"	Trower, Bronze	3:56
9.	"All That I Want"	S. Bryant, Susanne Jerome-Taylor, Clifford T. Ward	4:32
10.	"(Let's) Turn This Fight into a Brawl"	Trower	3:46
11.	"Climb Above the Rooftops"	Trower	4:14

== Personnel ==
Robin Trower Band

- Davey Pattison – vocals
- Robin Trower – guitar
- Bobby Mayo – keyboards
- John Regan – bass
- Tony Beard – drums

Guests

- Matt Noble – keyboards on "Under the Gun"
- Bashiri Johnson – percussion
- Peppy Castro – background vocals
- Al Fritsch – background vocals
