= Sint-Job-in-'t-Goor =

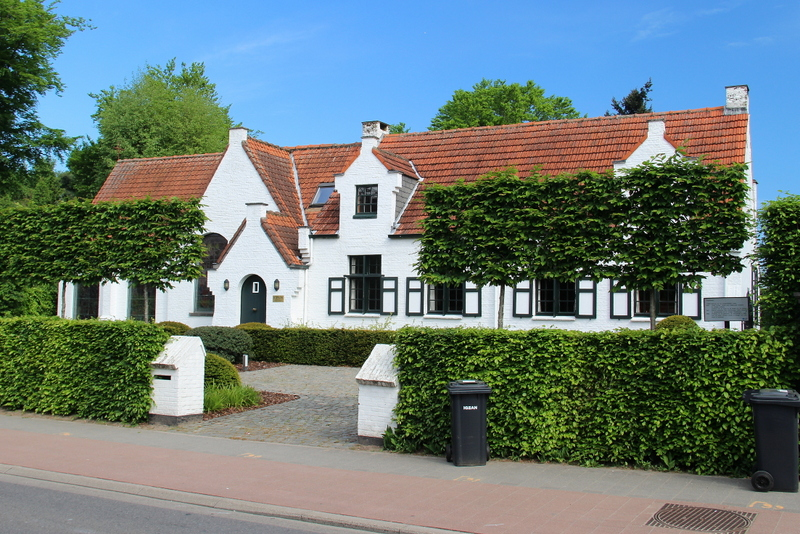
- Chapel farm

- Coat of arms

- Location in Belgium
- Coordinates: 51°18′N 4°34′E
- Country: Belgium
- Region: Flemish Region
- Community: Flemish Community
- Province: Antwerp
- Arrondissement: Antwerp
- Municipality: Brecht

Area
  - Total: 7.16 km^{2} (2.76 sq mi)

Population (2021)
  - Total: 8,647
  - Density: 1,210/km^{2} (3,130/sq mi)
- Postal codes: 2960
- Area codes: 03

Sint-Job-in-'t-Goor (Dutch pronunciation: [sɪɲˌtɕɔpɪnətˈxoːr]) is a village in the municipality of Brecht in the province of Antwerp, Belgium. Sint-Job-in-'t-Goor has 8,647 inhabitants (2021).

== History ==
The location of Sint-Job was already mentioned in the 13th century, and was originally centered around a chapel dedicated to the biblical prophet Job. Initially, the chapel fell under the parish of Schoten, until it was separated from it in the 16th century. During this time, Sint-Job and Schoten formed a part of the Archdiocese of Cambrai, while neighbouring Brecht fell under the Diocese of Liège.

On 25 September 1908, aviation pioneer baron de Caters was the first Belgian to fly an aircraft by taking off with his plane over the fields south of the village. Soon after, de Caters started the construction of the first airfield and pilot training school in Belgium at Sint-Job. Presently, the airfield has completely disappeared, but the local neighborhood is still called de vliegplein in reference to the airfield. Another famous Belgian pioneer, Jan Olieslagers, was also active in Sint-Job, but later contributed to the construction of the airport of Antwerp in Deurne.

During the Second World War, Sint-Job suffered heavily under days of harsh fighting in late September 1944, when Canadian and British troops tried to secure an undamaged bridge over the Turnhout-Schoten Canal on 23 September. However, the offensive failed after the allied troops met fierce German resistance and were unable to prevent the enemy from blowing up the bridge. Sint-Job was only liberated on 2 October, more than a week later, after the allied forces had captured the bridges at Rijkevorsel and Sint-Lenaarts, further north, on 28 September.

In the first half of the 20th century, Sint-Job also was popular green vacation resort for the wealthier inhabitants of Antwerp, who came enjoy their weekends in the village, away from the bustle of the city. Several campings along the canal, as well as the now protected nature domain the Brechtse Heide are still witnesses of this period today.

During the meeting of the municipal council on 15 November 1972, the idea of a fusion of the municipality of Sint-Job with the neighbouring municipality of either Schoten, Brecht or 's-Gravenwezel was mentioned and discussed for the first time. Eventually, Sint-Job was included in the municipality of Brecht in 1977, at the same time as the village of Sint-Lennaarts did the same.

== Points of interest ==
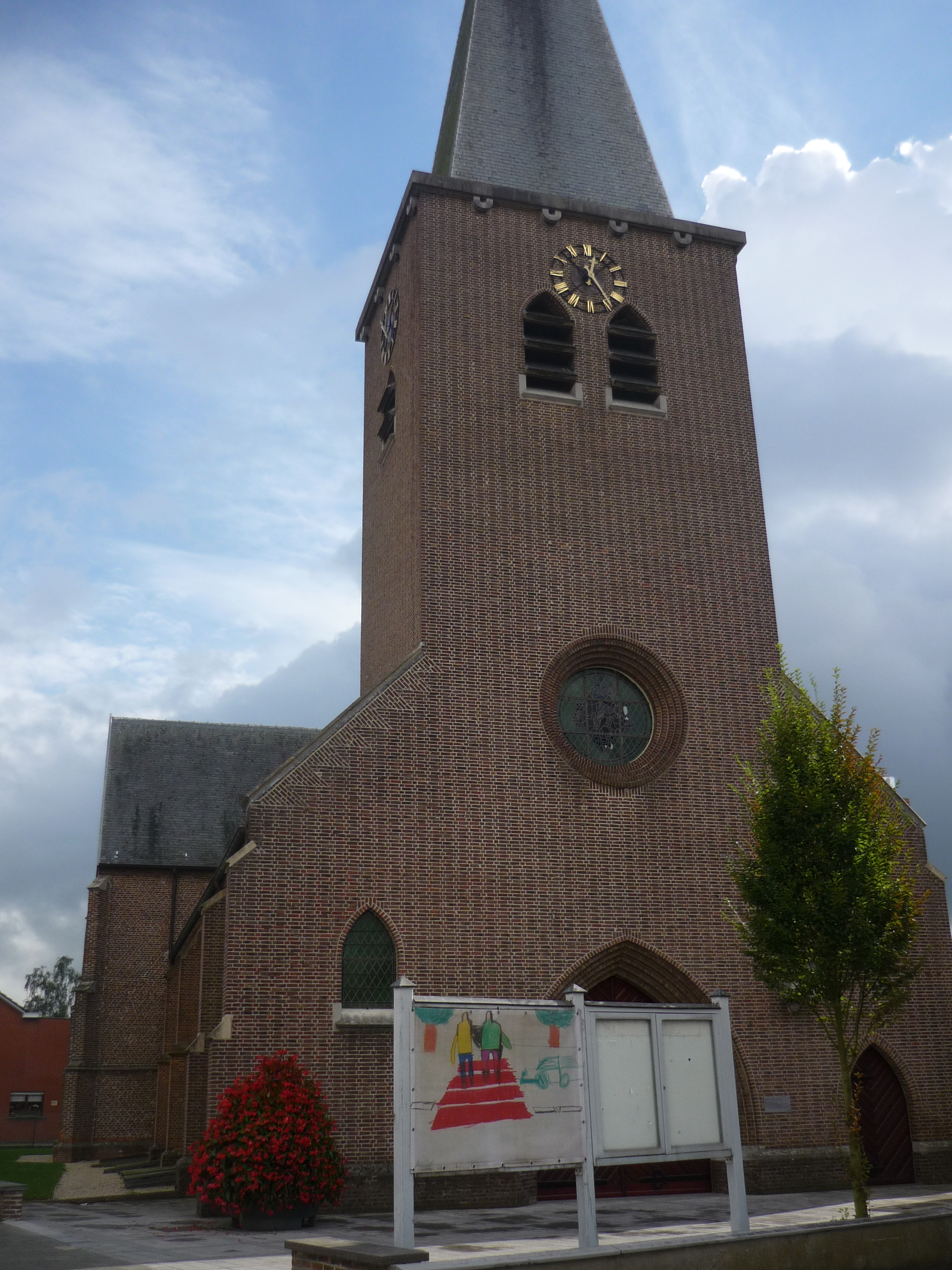
The church of Sint-Job in its present state

- The gothic Heilige Man Job ("Holy man Job") church dates back from 1511 and is more than 500 years old. The two aisles were built in the 19th century. In May 1940, the church was heavily damaged by troops of the retreating Belgian army, who blew up the tower to prevent the Germans from using it as a lookout post. After the war, the tower was rebuilt in contemporary style.
- The disk-shaped water tower near the centre of the town.
- Winter's Bridge, a monument next to the canal in memory of the liberation of the village in 1944 during the Second World War.
- The Anti-tank trench, built between 1937 and 1939 as a fortification against a possible German invasion, passes by Sint-Job. The trench is today designated as a nature reserve and recreational cycling path.
- The Kristus Koning ("King Christ") institute, a school for special education with a architectonically unique covered schoolyard.
- The Bosuil, a wood carved monument made from a centuries old dead beech that stood on the Brechtse heide nature reserve. The monument refers to the nickname given to Sint-Job's inhabitants, the Bosuilen (tawny owls) and can be found at the entrance of the administrative centre.

== Culture ==
=== Events ===
- Annual fair: first Sunday after May 10
- Sint-Job Zomert festival: either late August or early September
- Weekly market: a weekly market is held every Wednesday afternoon on the town square.

Until 2013, a braderie was also held every second Sunday of September. However, since 2014, the event is cancelled due to the generally low interest, both with the organizers and the local population.

== Mobility ==
- Sint-Job is intersected by the Dessel–Turnhout–Schoten Canal
- The N115 national road connects Antwerp with Brecht and Hoogstraten and forms a main axis running through Sint-Job. The road runs through the village from the southwest to the northeast, parallel to the Antwerp-Turnhout canal.
- Just north of the village lies a highway ramp, providing access to the E19 connecting Antwerp with Breda in the Netherlands. Since the 90s, the highway ramp has become the site of numerous accidents, and frequently, traffic jams during the morning rush hour in Antwerp begin near Sint-Job.
- The HSL 4 high speed train line, running parallel to the E19, runs past the village, but there is no station available in Sint-Job.
- Sint-Job is also serviced by multiple bus routes operated by the Flemish transport company De Lijn. Bus connections are available to Antwerp to the south, both over the N115 via Schoten and the E19 highway, Sint-Antonius to the east, Maria-ter-Heide to the west and Brecht, and the Noorderkempen to the north.

== Notable citizens ==
- Max Wildiers, philosopher and theologian
- Peter Benoit, composer
- Valère Depauw, writer
- Daniëlla Somers, kickboxer, two-time world champion
- Peter Van Asbroeck, actor
- Christel Van Dyck, radio host
- Oliver Symons, Belgian participant to the Junior Eurovision Song Contest 2008
- Dirk De Smet, winner of the TV show X Factor in 2008
- Johnny Verbeeck, last Belgian producer of hand-made barrel organs
- Erwin Lemmens, football player
