= Udo Mechels =

Belgian singer

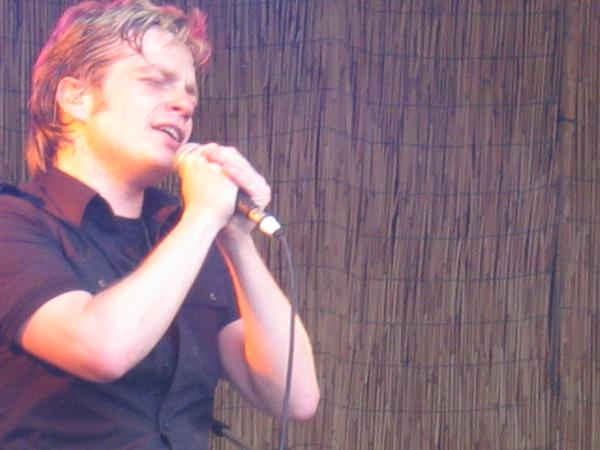
- Udo Mechels in 2007
- Born: 10 May 1976 (age 50); Brussels, Belgium
- Occupation: singer

Udo Mechels, born in Brussels on 10 May 1976, is a Belgian singer commonly known simply as Udo. He won the first season of the Belgian version of The X Factor in 2005.

== Biography ==
In 2003, Udo participated in the first season of Belgian Idols, but lost in the semi-finals to Chris D. Morton and Tom Olaerts. In 2005, he was a contestant on the Belgian edition of The X-Factor, and won in December 2005.

Udo released his debut album U-Turn and his #1 debut single "Isn't It Time", a cover of the song by The Babys, in 2006. He received a gold record for U-Turn during the TV programme Tien Om Te Zien on 4 July 2007.

In 2006 Udo also received a TMF Award for "Best New Artist" and the Radio 2 trophy for "Breakthrough of the Year".

Udo recorded a cover of Clouseau's song "Heb Ik Ooit Gezegd" (itself a cover based on the Van Morrison song "Have I Told You Lately"), for the album Braveau Clouseau (2007). The album, a tribute to Clouseau, topped the Belgium (Flanders) Ultratop 200 Albums chart in September 2007 and was certified Gold in Belgium on 22 September 2007. Udo performed the song live in 2011 at a concert in Lier, Belgium; Alexandra Soto of Gazet van Antwerpen described Udo's performance of "Heb ik ooit gezegd" as "beautiful".

On 30 March 2007, Udo performed "Ik Mis Je Zo" by Will Tura on the Flemish television show Zo Is Er Maar Één and won. Udo released this song on 19 April 2007 with "Tu Me Manques", the French version of this song, accompanying the single. He received a gold record for this song during Tien Om Te Zien on 5 September 2007.

His next album, Good Things Coming was released in January 2008.

Udo has his own live-band, Udo Live!, which first performed on 28 March 2007 at De Zuiderkroon in Antwerp. The live band consists of guitarist Chris Van Nauw, Roberto Mercurio playing bass guitar, David Demeyere on drums, Jan Samyn keyboardist, and Marva Nielsen and Dany Caen providing backup vocals.

In 2014 he participated in the Belgium national selection for Eurovision Song Contest 2014 with the song, "Hero (In Flanders Fields)", placing sixth.

Udo wrote and co-wrote many songs for other artists in Belgium and abroad.

== Discography ==
=== Albums ===
- 2006: U-Turn (also available as a limited edition)
- 2007: U-Turn Limited Edition with Ik Mis Je Zo
- 2008: Good Things Coming
- 2010: Barrières
- 2017: Over Prinsen, Over Draken
- 2018: Kerst
- 2023: Nostalgine

=== Singles ===
- 2005: "Isn't It Time"
- 2006: "Winter in July"
- 2006: "Back Against the Wall"
- 2006: "Eyes of a Stranger" (available by download only)
- 2007: "Ik Mis Je Zo / Tu Me Manques A Mourir"
- 2008: "You've Got a Good Thing Comin'"
- 2008: "Beautiful"
- 2008: "Man I Feel Like a Woman!" (titeltrack "LouisLouise")
- 2010: "Voorbij"
- 2010: "Teruggaan in de tijd"
- 2010: "Dansen Op U2"
- 2011: "Verloren hart, verloren droom"
- 2011: "Ik Kom Naar Huis"
- 2012: "You're So Hot"
- 2013: "Magie"
- 2013: "De zon, de zon"
- 2014: "De Prinstepolste"
- 2014: "Hero"
- 2014: "Broken Smile" (Udo & Sil)
- 2014: "Zomer In Je Hart"
- 2015: "Get Outta My Life"
- 2015: "Zielsveel Van Jou"
- 2016: "Flits"
- 2017: "Zomer In Je Hart"
- 2017: "Wat Als Je God Zag"
- 2018: "Hier Niet Ver Vandaan"
- 2018: "Een Witte Kerstmis Dit Jaar"
- 2019: "Kerstmis In De Haan Aan Zee"
- 2020: "Ne Partez Pas Sans Moi"
- 2020: "Au-delà"
- 2020: "Viens Danser"
- 2020: "Hey"
- 2020: "Donne-moi ton coeur"
- 2020: "Fever"
