= When I See You Smile =

1989 single by Bad English

Single by Bad English

from the album Bad English
- B-side: "Rockin' Horse"; "Tough Times Don't Last"
- Released: August 30, 1989
- Genre: Glam metal; pop rock
- Length: 4:17
- Label: Epic
- Songwriter: Diane Warren
- Producer: Richie Zito

Bad English singles chronology
"Forget Me Not" (1989)	"When I See You Smile" (1989)	"Price of Love" (1990)

"When I See You Smile" is a song written by Diane Warren and performed by American-British glam metal band Bad English. It was released on August 30, 1989, as the second single from their self-titled debut album (1989). The power ballad is the band's most successful song, reaching number-one in both the United States and Canada.

== Music video ==
In the video the band are performing on a stage, which contains close-up shots of its members. The footage was taken at one of their arena concerts. It shows Jonathan Cain's distinctive synthesizer opening and moves into the soft initial vocal work of John Waite. The tempo picks up with Deen Castronovo's drum work and Neal Schon's trademark guitar during which Waite becomes more emphatic vocally; the song finishes with Waite's soft vocals. The video was directed by Jonathan Cain.

== Track listings ==
7-inch, cassette, and mini-CD single

1. "When I See You Smile" – 4:16
2. "Rockin' Horse" – 5:26

12-inch and CD single

1. "When I See You Smile" – 4:17
2. "Tough Times Don't Last" – 4:40
3. "Rockin' Horse" – 5:28

== Charts ==
=== Weekly charts ===
Chart (1989–1990)	Peak position
Australia (ARIA)	4
Canada Top Singles (RPM)	1
Canada Adult Contemporary (RPM)	11
UK Singles (Official Charts)	61
US Billboard Hot 100	1
US Adult Contemporary (Billboard)	11
US Mainstream Rock Airplay (Billboard)	10

=== Year-end charts ===
Chart (1989)	Position
Canada Top Singles (RPM)	38
US Billboard Hot 100	34

Chart (1990)	Position
Australia (ARIA)	21

== Certifications ==
Region	Certification	Certified units/sales
Australia (ARIA)	Platinum	70,000^{^}
Canada (Music Canada)	Gold	50,000^{^}
United States (RIAA)	Gold	500,000^{^}
^{^} Shipments figures based on certification alone.

== Release history ==
Region	Date	Format(s)	Label(s)	Ref.
United States	August 30, 1989	7-inch vinyl; cassette	Epic	
United Kingdom	November 6, 1989	7-inch vinyl; 12-inch vinyl	Epic	
United Kingdom	November 13, 1989	12-inch vinyl with patch	Epic	
United Kingdom	December 4, 1989	7-inch picture disc	Epic	
Japan	December 7, 1989	Mini-CD	Epic	
