= Wit licht =

Single by Marco Borsato

from the album Wit licht
- Released: 18 April 2008
- Genre: Pop
- Length: 3:59
- Label: Universal Music
- Songwriter: John Ewbank
- Producer: John Ewbank

Marco Borsato singles chronology
"Everytime I Think of You" (2006)	"Wit licht" (2008)	"Stop de tijd" (2008)

"Wit licht" (English: "White Light") is a single by Dutch singer-songwriter Marco Borsato, from his album "Wit licht". The song was released on 18 April 2008. It was written and produced by John Ewbank. It reached the peak position in both the Mega Single Top 100 and the Dutch Top 40. In Flanders, the song reached the third position in the Ultratop 50.

On 20 March 2008 it was announced that an eponymous album and an eponymous movie, with Borsato in one of the leading roles, would be released. The album Wit licht was released on September 17 and reached the peak position in both the Album Top 100 in the Netherlands and the Ultratop 100 Albums in Flanders. The movie Wit licht, directed by Jean van de Velde, premiered on December 8 in the Tuschinski movie theater in Amsterdam. Prince Willem-Alexander and princess Máxima visited the première.

== Charts ==
=== Weekly charts ===
Chart (2008)	Peak position
Belgium (Ultratop 50 Flanders)	3
Netherlands (Dutch Top 40)	1
Netherlands (Single Top 100)	1

=== Year-end charts ===
Chart (2008)	Position
Netherlands (Dutch Top 40)	51
Netherlands (Single Top 100)	9

== See also ==
- List of Dutch Top 40 number-one singles of 2006
