= List of Dutch Top 40 number-one singles of 2006 =

This is a list of the Dutch Top 40 number-one singles of 2006. The Dutch Top 40 is a chart that ranks the best-performing singles of the Netherlands. It is published by radio station Radio 538.

== Chart history ==
Issue date	Song	Artist(s)	Reference(s)
7 January	"Talk"	Coldplay	
14 January	"Talk"	Coldplay	
21 January	"Talk"	Coldplay	
28 January	"Because of You"	Kelly Clarkson	
4 February	"Because of You"	Kelly Clarkson	
11 February	"Because We Believe"	Andrea Bocelli featuring Marco Borsato	
18 February	"Because We Believe"	Andrea Bocelli featuring Marco Borsato	
25 February	"Because We Believe"	Andrea Bocelli featuring Marco Borsato	
4 March	"Because We Believe"	Andrea Bocelli featuring Marco Borsato	
11 March	"Because We Believe"	Andrea Bocelli featuring Marco Borsato	
18 March	"Because We Believe"	Andrea Bocelli featuring Marco Borsato	
25 March	"Right Here Right Now"	Raffaëla Paton	
1 April	"Right Here Right Now"	Raffaëla Paton	
8 April	"Right Here Right Now"	Raffaëla Paton	
15 April	"Right Here Right Now"	Raffaëla Paton	
22 April	"Right Here Right Now"	Raffaëla Paton	
29 April	"Hips Don't Lie"	Shakira featuring Wyclef Jean	
6 May	"Hips Don't Lie"	Shakira featuring Wyclef Jean	
13 May	"Rood"	Marco Borsato	
20 May	"Rood"	Marco Borsato	
27 May	"Rood"	Marco Borsato	
3 June	"Rood"	Marco Borsato	
10 June	"Rood"	Marco Borsato	
17 June	"Rood"	Marco Borsato	
24 June	"Rood"	Marco Borsato	
1 July	"Rood"	Marco Borsato	
8 July	"Rood"	Marco Borsato	
15 July	"Rood"	Marco Borsato	
22 July	"Rood"	Marco Borsato	
29 July	"Mas Que Nada"	Sérgio Mendes featuring Black Eyed Peas	
5 August	"Mas Que Nada"	Sérgio Mendes featuring Black Eyed Peas	
12 August	"Toppertje!"	Guillermo & Tropical Danny	
19 August	"Toppertje!"	Guillermo & Tropical Danny	
26 August	"Boten Anna"	Basshunter	
2 September	"Boten Anna"	Basshunter	
9 September	"Als De Morgen Is Gekomen"	Jan Smit	
16 September	"Als De Morgen Is Gekomen"	Jan Smit	
23 September	"Als De Morgen Is Gekomen"	Jan Smit	
30 September	"Als De Morgen Is Gekomen"	Jan Smit	
7 October	"Als De Morgen Is Gekomen"	Jan Smit	
14 October	"Everytime I Think of You"	Marco Borsato & Lucie Silvas	
21 October	"Everytime I Think of You"	Marco Borsato & Lucie Silvas	
28 October	"Everytime I Think of You"	Marco Borsato & Lucie Silvas	
4 November	"Everytime I Think of You"	Marco Borsato & Lucie Silvas	
11 November	"Everytime I Think of You"	Marco Borsato & Lucie Silvas	
18 November	"The Saints Are Coming"	U2 & Green Day	
25 November	"The Saints Are Coming"	U2 & Green Day	
2 December	"Paniek in De Confettifabriek"	Coole Piet	
9 December	"Cupido"	Jan Smit	
16 December	"Cupido"	Jan Smit	
23 December	"Cupido"	Jan Smit	
30 December	"Cupido"	Jan Smit	

== Number-one artists ==
Position	Artist	Weeks #1
1	Marco Borsato	22
2	Jan Smit	9
3	Andrea Bocelli	6
4	Lucie Silvas	5
4	Raffaëla Paton	5
5	Coldplay	3
6	Kelly Clarkson	2
6	Shakira	2
6	Wyclef Jean	2
6	Sérgio Mendes	2
6	Black Eyed Peas	2
6	Guillermo & Tropical Danny	2
6	Basshunter	2
6	U2	2
6	Green Day	2
7	Coole Piet	1

== See also ==
- 2006 in music
- List of number-one hits (Netherlands)
