= Backlash (Bad English album) =

Studio album by Bad English
- Released: 27 August 1991
- Recorded: 1991
- Studios: Conway Studios and Secret Sound L.A. (Hollywood, California); Can-Am Recorders (Tarzana, California); Zoo Studios (Encino, California).
- Genre: Hard rock
- Length: 48:22
- Label: Epic
- Producer: Ron Nevison

Bad English chronology
Bad English (1989)	Backlash (1991)

Professional ratings
Review scores
Source	Rating
AllMusic	2/5 stars
The Encyclopedia of Popular Music	3/5 stars
Entertainment Weekly	B
Metal Hammer	4/5 stars
MusicHound Rock: The Essential Album Guide	2/5 stars
The Rolling Stone Album Guide	1.5/5 stars

Backlash is the second and final studio album by British/American rock band Bad English, released in 1991.

The album peaked at No. 72 on the Billboard 200.

== Critical reception ==
Entertainment Weekly wrote that "taken together, the album — with its unceasing references to rain and rivers — inevitably bogs down, but heard one at a time over the FM in the Ford, even its platitudes, given [John] Waite’s delivery, add up to a hack-rock miracle or two." The Rolling Stone Album Guide deemed Backlash "more spirited" than the debut.

== Track listing ==
No.	Title	Writer(s)	Length
1.	"So This Is Eden"	John Waite; Jonathan Cain; Russ Ballard	5:09
2.	"Straight to Your Heart"	Waite; Neal Schon; Cain; Mark Spiro	4:09
3.	"Time Stood Still"	Waite; Ricky Phillips; Jesse Harms	5:23
4.	"The Time Alone with You"	Waite; Diane Warren; Cain	4:41
5.	"Dancing Off the Edge of the World"	Waite; Cain; Schon	4:54
6.	"Rebel Say a Prayer"	Waite; Cain; Ballard	4:23
7.	"Savage Blue"	Waite; Cain; Schon	4:33
8.	"Pray for Rain"	Waite; Spiro; Cain	5:03
9.	"Make Love Last"	Waite; Cain	5:19
10.	"Life at the Top"	Waite; Cain; Spiro; Tim Pierce	4:51
Total length:			48:22

== Personnel ==
Bad English

- John Waite – lead vocals
- Jonathan Cain – keyboards, backing vocals
- Neal Schon – guitars, backing vocals
- Ricky Phillips – bass, backing vocals
- Deen Castronovo – drums, backing vocals

Additional musicians

- Tommy Funderburk – backing vocals
- Mark Spiro – backing vocals

=== Production ===
- Ron Nevison – producer, engineer
- Tony Phillips – vocal producer, vocal engineer
- Gil Morales – assistant engineer
- Jeff Poe – assistant engineer
- Dave Lopez – assistant vocal engineer
- Rand & Rose – mixing
- Ted Jensen – mastering at Sterling Sound (New York City, New York)
- Deandra Miller – production assistant
- Hugh Syme – art direction, design
- Brian Aris – photography
- HK Management and Trudy Green – management
- Lynda Lou Beach – management assistant
- Ged Malone – management assistant

== Charts ==
Chart (1991)	Peak position
Canada Top Albums/CDs (RPM)	34
Dutch Albums (Album Top 100)	42
German Albums (Offizielle Top 100)	48
Swedish Albums (Sverigetopplistan)	21
Swiss Albums (Schweizer Hitparade)	30
UK Albums (Official Charts)	64
US Billboard 200	72
