= Head First (The Babys album) =

1978 studio album by the Babys

Studio album by the Babys
- Released: December 1978
- Recorded: 1978
- Studio: Hidden Valley Ranch Studio, Malibu, California
- Genre: Rock
- Length: 35:52
- Label: Chrysalis
- Producer: James Stroud, Ron Nevison

The Babys chronology
Broken Heart (1977)	Head First (1978)	Union Jacks (1980)

Professional ratings
Review scores
Source	Rating
AllMusic	2.5/5 stars
The Rolling Stone Record Guide	1/5 stars
Smash Hits	5/10

Head First is the third album by the Babys. Internal conflicts led to founder, guitarist and keyboard player Michael Corby being removed from the group by Chrysalis on 28 August 1978. The three remaining members—John Waite, Wally Stocker and Tony Brock—completed the album for a December 1978 release. Head First peaked at number 18 on the Australian chart.

Chrysalis had re-teamed the band with Ron Nevison, but there was disagreement on whether to focus on rockers or ballads. Consequently, Head First was recorded in a pressure-cooker environment with the Record Plant 24-track mobile at Hidden Valley Ranch in Malibu. Corby had imagined more of a "progressive rock type" of album, while Waite was moving towards more country-oriented material (evidenced by outtakes "Restless Heart" and "World In A Bottle"). They band had spent $300,000 in six weeks. But the album was rejected by Chrysalis and an irate Corby was shocked to find songs on there he had never played on or heard of before.

Some two weeks later, after Corby had been let go, the remaining trio returned to the studio in an effort to revamp Head First, its release delayed to the end of the year. They re-recorded it in stripped-back form, Corby's contributions relegated to keyboards only, while they added a swaggering opener, "Love Don’t Prove I’m Right", plus the visceral, gospel-backed "Every Time I Think Of You".

== Album information ==
Lead single status was afforded to "Every Time I Think of You," a track completed without Corby, who was friends with the tune's composers, Jack Conrad and Ray Kennedy, the team responsible for the Babys' previous Top 40 hit "Isn't It Time." "Every Time I Think of You" matched the Billboard Hot 100 No. 13 peak of "Isn't It Time" in April 1979, the same month that Head First became the Babys' highest-charting album with a No. 22 peak on the Billboard albums chart. After serving as the B-side for "Every Time I Think of You," the title track "Head First" was issued as the A-side of the follow-up single with another album track, "California" as B-side; this single reached No. 77 on the Hot 100.

Head First was reissued on 26 May 2009 under Rock Candy Records after being out of print for many years. There are no bonus tracks, but all of the tracks have been remastered.

== Tracklist ==
Side one

1. "Love Don't Prove I'm Right" (John Waite, Wally Stocker, Tony Brock) – 2:45
2. "Every Time I Think of You" (Jack Conrad, Ray Kennedy) – 4:00
3. "I Was One" (Waite, Mike Japp) – 3:30
4. "White Lightning" (Billy Nicholls) – 3:20
5. "Run to Mexico" (Waite, Stocker, Mike Corby, Brock) – 4:35

Side two

6. "Head First" (Waite, Stocker, Brock) – 3:57
7. "You (Got It)" (Waite) – 4:37
8. "Please Don't Leave Me Here" (Waite, Corby, Stocker) – 5:08
9. "California" (Waite) – 4:00

== Personnel ==
=== Band ===
- John Waite: vocals (lead on all but 8, co lead on 8), bass (all but tracks 1 & 2)
- Walter Stocker: guitar (all but 4, 7 & 9), acoustic guitar (4, 7 & 9)
- Tony Brock: drums (all tracks), percussion (all but 5), co-lead vocals (track 8)
- Michael Corby: organ (4, Hammond on 9), keyboards (5), piano (7, 8)

=== Additional personnel ===
- Allan MacMillan: string and horn arrangements (all but 2)
- Jack Conrad: bass (2)
- Kevin Kelly: piano (2)
- Jimmie Haskell: string and horn arrangement (2)
- Marti McCall, Myrna Mathews, Dianna Lee: backing vocals (2)
- Mike Japp: backing vocals (3)
- John Sinclair: synthesizer (4 & 9)
- Robb Lawrence: mandolin (9)
- Bobbye Hall: additional percussion (9)

== Certifications ==
Region	Certification	Certified units/sales
Australia (ARIA)	Gold	20,000^{^}
^{^} Shipments figures based on certification alone.
