= Union Jacks =

Studio album by the Babys
- Released: 8 January 1980
- Recorded: 1979
- Studio: Sound City, Los Angeles, California
- Genre: Hard rock
- Length: 35:08
- Label: Chrysalis
- Producer: Keith Olsen

The Babys chronology
Head First (1978)	Union Jacks (1980)	On the Edge (1980)

Professional ratings
Review scores
Source	Rating
AllMusic	3.0/5 stars
Record Mirror	2/5 stars

Union Jacks is the Babys' fourth album, which peaked at number 42 on the Billboard 200 in 1980. The lead single "True Love True Confession" failed to chart and was succeeded by the minor hit "Midnight Rendezvous," and finally the hit single "Back on My Feet Again", which was their last Top 40 hit, reaching #33. The band recorded a fifth album, On the Edge, then split. Union Jacks was reissued on 26 May 2009 under Rock Candy Records after being out of print for many years. There are no bonus tracks, but all of the tracks have been remastered. This was the first Babys album to feature keyboardist Jonathan Cain and bassist Ricky Phillips.

== Track listing ==
1. ""Back on My Feet Again"" (John Waite, Dominic Bugatti, Frank Musker) - 3:18
2. "True Love True Confession" (Waite, Jonathan Cain) - 4:07
3. "Midnight Rendezvous" (Waite, Cain) - 3:36
4. "Union Jack" (Waite, Ricky Phillips) - 5:42
5. "In Your Eyes" (Waite, Phillips) - 4:05
6. "Anytime" (Waite, Tony Brock, Phillips, Wally Stocker, Cain) - 3:21
7. "Jesus, Are You There?" (Waite, Stocker, Cain) - 3:34
8. "Turn Around in Tokyo" (Cain) - 3:53
9. "Love Is Just a Mystery" (Waite, Brock, Stocker) - 3:32

== Personnel ==
Band

- John Waite: lead vocals, except on "Turn Around in Tokyo"
- Wally Stocker: guitar
- Jonathan Cain: keyboards, backing vocals, lead vocals on "Turn Around in Tokyo"
- Ricky Phillips: bass
- Tony Brock: drums

with:

- Anne Marie Leclerc - backing vocals on "True Love True Confession"

== Charts ==
Album

Chart	Peak position
The Billboard 200	42
Australia	58

Singles

Year	Single	Chart	Position
1979	"Back On My Feet Again"	Billboard Hot 100	33
1980	"Midnight Rendezvous"	Billboard Hot 100	72
