= Every Time I Think of You =

1978 song by the Babys

- Side-A label of the British single

Single by The Babys

from the album Head First
- B-side: "Head First"
- Released: December 1978
- Recorded: 1978
- Genre: Power pop; pop rock; soft rock
- Length: 3:45 (single version); 4:00 (album version)
- Label: Chrysalis
- Songwriters: Jack Conrad, Ray Kennedy
- Producer: Ron Nevison

The Babys singles chronology
"Silver Dreams" (1978)	"Every Time I Think of You" (1978)	"Head First" (1979)

"Every Time I Think of You" is a song written by Jack Conrad and Ray Kennedy and released in December 1978 as the lead single from The Babys' third studio album Head First. John Waite provided lead vocals, featuring female vocals by Myrna Matthews. The track was a worldwide hit, and became their last top 20 in the United States.

== Original version ==
Released as the lead single from the Head First album in late December 1978, "Every Time I Think of You" ascended to a Billboard Hot 100 peak of number 13 on March 17, 1979. The Babys' previous Top 40 hit "Isn't It Time" had also peaked at number 13; like "Isn't It Time" – which was also a Jack Conrad/Ray Kennedy composition – "Every Time I Think of You" augmented the vocal of Babys' frontman John Waite with prominent female vocals, with "Every Time I Think of You" featuring Myrna Matthews, Pat Henderson and Marti McCall, although Anne Bertucci features on video clips as the sole backup vocalist. Jimmie Haskell arranged and conducted the string section heard on the track.

"Every Time I Think of You" rose as high as number 8 on the Cash Box Top 100 Singles chart. "Isn't It Time" also peaked at number 8 on Cash Box in December 1977. "Every Time I Think of You" afforded the Babys a hit in Australia, Canada and the Netherlands, with respective peaks of number 6, number 8 and number 11; the track also reached number 41 in New Zealand. The Fort Worth Star Telegram rated it to be the best single of 1979.

The track which had served as B-side to "Every Time I Think of You": "Head First", was issued as the A-side of the Babys' next single with another track from the Head First album: "California", as B-side. The "Head First" single peaked at number 77 on the Billboard Hot 100. The Babys would have a third and final Top 40 charting in 1980 with "Back on My Feet Again" (number 33).

== Charts ==
=== Weekly charts ===
Chart (1979)	Peak position
Australia (Kent Music Report)	6
Belgium (Ultratop 50 Flanders)	13
Canadian Top Singles (RPM)	8
Netherlands (Dutch Top 40)	7
Netherlands (Single Top 100)	11
New Zealand (Recorded Music NZ)	41
US Billboard Hot 100	13
US Billboard Adult Contemporary	36
US Cash Box Top 100	8

=== Year-end charts ===
Chart (1979)	Position
Australia (Kent Music Report)	61
Canadian Top Singles (RPM)	84
Netherlands (Dutch Top 40)	61
Netherlands (Single Top 100)	51
US Top Pop Singles (Billboard)	88
US Cash Box	73
US (Joel Whitburn's Pop Annual)	98

"Everytime I Think of You"

Single by Marco Borsato and Lucie Silvas

from the album The Same Side (Lucie Silvas) Symphonica in Rosso (Marco Borsato)
- B-side: "Almost" (3:28)
- Released: 2 October 2006
- Recorded: 2006
- Genre: pop
- Length: 4:07
- Label: Universal
- Songwriters: Jack Conrad, Ray Kennedy

Marco Borsato singles chronology
"Rood" (2006)	"Everytime I Think of You" (2006)	"Wit Licht" (2008)

Lucie Silvas singles chronology
"Nothing Else Matters" (2005)	"Everytime I Think of You" (2006)	"Last Year" (2006)

== Cover versions ==
A number 11 hit on Belgium's Flemish charts via a 2000 a remake by Get Ready! (nl), "Every Time I Think of You" was remade in 2006 by Marco Borsato and Lucie Silvas whose version – with the spelling adjusted to "Everytime I Think of You" – was released for download 2 October 2006 to chart on the Dutch Top 40, dated 7 October 2006, at number 35; released as a CD single on 6 October 2006, the track was number 1 in the Netherlands for the week of 14 October 2006, remaining at number 1 for three subsequent weeks. A hit on Belgium's Flemish charts at number 5, "Everytime I Think of You" was added to the track listing of Lucie Silvas' album The Same Side for its release in the Netherlands.

== Formats and track listings – Marco Borsato/Lucie Silvas version ==
Digital Download (2 October 2006)
No.	Title	Writer(s)	Length
1.	"Everytime I Think of You" (Marco Borsato and Lucie Silvas)	Jack Conrad, Ray Kennedy	4:07
2.	"Almost" (Lucie Silvas)	Lucie Silvas, Judie Tzuke, Charlie Russell, Graham Kearns	3:28

== Charts – Marco Borsato/Lucie Silvas version ==
=== Weekly charts ===
Chart (2006)	Peak position
Belgium (Ultratop 50 Flanders)	5
Eurochart Hot 100 Singles	88
Netherlands (Dutch Top 40)	1
Netherlands (Single Top 100)	1

=== Year-end charts ===
Chart (2006)	Position
Belgium (Ultratop Flanders)	61
Netherlands (Dutch Top 40)	20
Netherlands (Single Top 100)	16
