= Days Before Tomorrow =

Days Before Tomorrow is an American melodic, progressive rock band from New Jersey.

== History ==
Days Before Tomorrow was founded in 2006 by guitar player Scott Kahn and keyboard player Jason Buchwald. The band name, Days Before Tomorrow, chosen by Scott Kahn and his wife, was a takeoff on the movie The Day After Tomorrow. With the addition of lead vocalist Eric Klein and bassist Chris Walker, the band self-produced and commercially released their debut, self-titled EP in 2006. Drums on the EP were played by session drummer (and former Seether drummer) Kevin Soffera. Amidst favorable reviews, the first track, “Can’t Do Anything,” received an honorable mention in Billboard Magazine’s 14th Annual Songwriting Contest. Then, in August 2008, a demo recording of the song “Sleepwalking” received an honorable mention in Billboard Magazine’s 15th Annual Songwriting Competition.

During the next few years, Days Before Tomorrow underwent a number of personnel changes, with Kahn and Klein remaining from the original lineup. After drummer Jason Gianni joined the band, Days Before Tomorrow focused on progressive rock music. Second guitarist Derek Davodowich was added to the band, and bassist Robert "Zeek" Maziekien replaced Walker.

The band continued writing new material and performing in the New York metropolitan area. Co-founder Jason Buchwald relocated to Arizona and left the band. In 2008, Days Before Tomorrow was asked by Kim Mulligan of SiriusXM and WDHA-FM Radio to remake a classic 1980s "hair band" song in their progressive rock style for the Main Man Records compilation CD, Hair Apparent: The Main Main Records Tribute to Hair Bands. The result was a remake of the Nelson hit, "After the Rain," mixed by Grammy Award winning engineer, Earl Cohen.

The band recorded its full-length CD, The Sky Is Falling, in the summer and fall of 2009. The album was produced by Ron Nevison. It was mixed by Earl Cohen. Guest artists on the CD included vocalist Kelli McCloud performing background vocals on the songs "Can't Go Back" and "Lighters." Keyboard tracks were performed by Jason Buchwald and Scott Kahn, and drummer Jason Gianni played piano on the song "Can't Do Anything."

Later in 2009, keyboard player Damon Fibraio joined the band, bassist Zeek left and was replaced by Paul O'Keeffe.

In 2009, Days Before Tomorrow won Record of the Year in the 19th Annual Los Angeles Music Awards, a music event that recognized excellence in independently-created music. In the spring and summer of 2011, the band began to record five songs for its next release, in Kahn's studio. But prior to completion, in the spring of 2012, Scott Kahn parted ways with Days Before Tomorrow.

One single, The Naked Sea was finished and mixed by Rodger Brennan. The Naked Sea featured Davodowich as the sole guitar player and marked the only release which had performances by O'Keeffe and Fibraio. The other 4 songs were never completed and the band went on hiatus.

After his tenure in Days Before Tomorrow, Scott Kahn went on to found a new progressive rock band, Beyond Tomorrow, which carried on his style of melodic progressive rock, but eventually he and Derek Davodowich got back together to form a modern/alt rock group, Dream Eternal Bliss. That band has released multiple records, with their third release in the Summer of 2023.

== The Next Chapter ==
In late 2022, Klein, Kahn, and Davodowich reconvened to put Days Before Tomorrow back together. The band finally mixed and released its long-anticipated release as Now and Then Part II: Stories and Dreams in February 2023 as a digital-only release. Days Before Tomorrow immediately gained industry attention from the release and subsequently signed to Melodic Revolution Records. MRR released a physical CD version of Now and Then Part II: Stories and Dreams in October 2023, with worldwide distribution.

The band begun writing new material for Now and Then Part I in early 2024. They were joined by keyboardist John Gale, and drummer Matt Maldonado. But in the winter 2024/2025, Derek Davodowich retired from the band. Much of 2025 was spent auditioning replacements, and in summer, 2025, guitarist Nelson Soto was welcomed into the band. Writing of new material resumed, and the band is set to record the new record in late 2025, for a winter 2025/2026 release.

== Band members ==
- Eric Klein — lead vocals (2006–present)
- Scott Kahn — guitars, keyboards, backing vocals (2006 - 2012, 2022–present)
- John Gale — keyboards, backing vocals (2022–present)
- Matt Maldonado - drums (2022–present)
- Jacob Asbury - bass (2023–present)
- Nelson Soto - guitars (2025–present)

== Former members ==
- Derek Davodowich — guitars, backing vocals (2007–2014, 2022–2024)
- Jason Gianni — drums, percussion, backing vocals (2008–2014)
- Damon Fibraio — keyboards, backing vocals (2009–2013)
- Paul O'Keeffe — bass, backing vocals (2009–2014)
- Kelli McCloud — backing vocals (2009 - 2010)
- Jason Buchwald — keyboards, backing vocals (2006 - 2008)
- Robert "Zeek" Maziekien — bass, backing vocals (2007 - 2009)
- Chris Walker — bass (2006)

== Discography ==
- Days Before Tomorrow (2006)
- After the Rain (single) (2008)
- The Sky Is Falling (2009)
- The Naked Sea (single) (2013)
- Now and Then Part II: Stories and Dreams (2023)
