= Mikel Japp =

Welsh musician

Michael C Japp (15 November 1952 – 31 January 2012) was a Welsh musician and songwriter.

Japp joined May Fisher, a Llanelli-based band, just before it was taken up by a London rock and pop music agency – through a friend who went on to establish 3PR – and sent on an extended and successful tour of Yugoslavia under a new name: Thank You. On their return, Thank You supported Joe Brown's Browns Home Brew and Marmalade on UK tours, as well as playing leading university and college dates. His aggressive, abrupt rock guitar style was first captured on recordings made by Joe Brown at his Essex recording studio. These were never released due to apparent difficulties in finding a vocal style from the band's two singers.

Japp had, however, made a strong impression on Marmalade and was invited to join the group to replace Hugh Nicolson. He toured extensively with the band but no recordings made during his tenure achieved chart status.

He also wrote/co-wrote songs for such artists as Paul Stanley, Kiss and The Babys, and worked with other musicians such as Matthew Fisher and John Waite.

As a solo artist, he released an album in 2000 titled Dreamer. Japp's style transitioned from rock to blues guitar. A number of videos featuring the musician have been posted on the Internet.

== Albums featuring Mike Japp's work ==
- New Nation (1976) – Roderick Falconer
- Broken Heart (1977) – The Babys
- Head First (1978) – The Babys
- Paul Stanley (1978) – Paul Stanley
- Killers (1982) – Kiss
- Creatures of the Night (1982) – Kiss
- Brickyard (1991) – Brickyard
- Dreamer (2000) – Mike Japp
