= On the Edge (The Babys album) =

1980 hard rock album by The Babys

Studio album by The Babys
- Released: October 1980
- Genre: Hard rock
- Length: 30:54
- Label: Chrysalis
- Producer: Keith Olsen

The Babys chronology
Union Jacks (1980)	On the Edge (1980)	Anthology (1981)

Professional ratings
Review scores
Source	Rating
Allmusic	2.0/5 stars
Billboard	(unrated)

On the Edge is the fifth and final studio album by hard rock band The Babys. The album was produced by Keith Olsen in 1980. "Turn and Walk Away" was the lone single to chart on the Billboard Hot 100, peaking at No. 42.

== Track listing ==
1. "Turn and Walk Away" (Waite, Cain) – 3:10
2. "Sweet 17" (Waite, Cain, Stocker) – 2:47
3. "She's My Girl" (Waite, Stocker) – 3:17
4. "Darker Side of Town" (Waite, Cain) – 2:25
5. "Rock 'n' Roll Is (Alive and Well)" (Waite, Cain, Phillips) – 4:07
6. "Downtown" ( Waite, Stocker) – 3:36
7. "Postcard" (Waite, Stocker, Brock, Phillips) – 2:41
8. "Too Far Gone" (Cain, Brock) – 2:53
9. "Gonna Be Somebody" (Waite, Cain, Brock) – 2:57
10. "Love Won't Wait" (Waite, Cain) – 3:01

== Personnel ==
- John Waite – lead vocals
- Wally Stocker – lead and rhythm guitars
- Jonathan Cain – keyboards, backing vocals, rhythm guitar; lead vocals on "Too Far Gone" and "Love Won't Wait"
- Ricky Phillips – bass
- Tony Brock – drums

=== Additional personnel ===
- Anne Marie Leclerc – backing vocals on "Sweet 17"
