= Tonight Tonight (Bill Champlin song) =

Single by Bill Champlin

from the album Runaway
- B-side: "Without You"
- Released: December 1981
- Recorded: 1981
- Genre: Soft rock
- Length: 3:53
- Label: Elektra
- Songwriters: Bill Champlin; David Foster; Raymond Louis Kennedy
- Producer: David Foster

Bill Champlin singles chronology
"What Good Is Love" (1978)	"Tonight Tonight" (1981)	"Sara" (1982)

"Tonight Tonight" is a single by American singer-songwriter Bill Champlin. It was released on Elektra Records as the lead single from his second studio album, Runaway.

On December 26, 1981, it debuted at No. 85 on the Billboard Hot 100. On January 30, 1982, it reached its peak at No. 55.

== Background and writing ==
"Tonight Tonight" was written by Champlin, producer David Foster, and Raymond Louis Kennedy. It was originally based on a song by the latter songwriter, which was titled "My Everlasting Love". Champlin also performs background vocals on the track by Kennedy.

== Personnel ==
- Bill Champlin – lead vocals, backing vocals, arrangements, string arrangements
- David Foster – arrangements, backing vocals, keyboards,
- Jay Graydon – guitar
- Abraham Laboriel – bass
- Larry Tolbert – drums
- Humberto Gatica – percussion
- Gary Herbig – tenor saxophone
- Jerry Hey – flugelhorn
- Harry Bluestone – concertmaster
- Richard Page – backing vocals
- Venette Gloud – backing vocals

== Charts ==
Chart (1982)	Peak position
US Billboard Hot 100	55
US Cashbox Top 100 Singles	69
