= The Babys (album) =

1976 album by The Babys

Studio album by The Babys
- Released: December 1976
- Studio: Nimbus 9 Studio, Toronto, Ontario, Canada
- Genre: Hard rock, AOR
- Length: 39:28
- Label: Chrysalis
- Producer: Brian Christian, Bob Ezrin

The Babys chronology
The Babys (1976)	Broken Heart (1977)

Professional ratings
Review scores
Source	Rating
AllMusic	3.0/5 stars

The Babys is the debut album of the British rock group The Babys, released in December 1976. It was later re-released as a double album with the group's second album Broken Heart.

Lead single "If You've Got the Time" charted on the Billboard Hot 100, peaking at No. 88.

== Track listing ==
All songs by John Waite, Wally Stocker, Michael Corby and Tony Brock; except where listed.

1. "Looking for Love" – 4:43
2. "If You've Got the Time" (John Waite) – 2:38
3. "I Believe in Love" – 4:17
4. "Wild Man" – 3:29
5. "Laura" – 5:02
6. "I Love How You Love Me" (Barry Mann, Larry Kolber) – 2:21
7. "Rodeo" (John Waite) – 2:58
8. "Over and Over" – 4:47
9. "Read My Stars" – 2:43
10. "Dying Man" – 6:30

== Personnel ==
- John Waite – lead vocals (all but 8), bass (uncredited)
- Wally Stocker – guitar (uncredited)
- Michael Corby – keyboards and guitar (uncredited)
- Tony Brock – drums (uncredited), lead vocals (8)

Technical

- Jon Prew – photography
