= Bad English =

American rock band

- Bad English, clockwise L-to-R: Neal Schon, Deen Castronovo, Ricky Phillips, Jonathan Cain, and John Waite

Background information
- Origin: Los Angeles, California, U.S.
- Genres: Hard rock; arena rock; glam metal
- Years active: 1987–1991
- Label: Epic
- Spinoff of: The Babys; Journey; Styx
- Members: John Waite; Neal Schon; Jonathan Cain; Ricky Phillips; Deen Castronovo

Bad English was an American–English hard rock supergroup band formed in Los Angeles in 1987. It reunited Journey keyboardist Jonathan Cain with singer John Waite and bassist Ricky Phillips, his former bandmates in the Babys, along with Journey guitarist Neal Schon and drummer Deen Castronovo. The band is known for their hit single "When I See You Smile", which peaked at number 1 on the Billboard Hot 100 in November 1989.

== History ==
Jonathan Cain and guitarist Neal Schon, members of the successful rock band Journey, formed Bad English with Waite after Journey disbanded. They were joined by Ricky Phillips, who had played bass for the Babys on two albums with Waite and Cain, and drummer Deen Castronovo.

The members decided on a name for the band while playing pool. John Waite missed a shot and Jonathan Cain made a comment on how bad his "english" was (referring to the spin a player puts on the cue ball), and the band decided to use the phrase.

=== First album ===
The band's first album, Bad English, was a big seller. It contained three top-40 hit singles: the number one hit "When I See You Smile", the top 10 hit "Price of Love", and "Possession".

The album's first single, however, was "Forget Me Not". It stalled outside the top 40 at number 45, but the single peaked at number 2 on the Mainstream Rock chart. The second single, "When I See You Smile", was their biggest hit, peaking at number 1 on the Hot 100. The song is also notable for being one of only two songs (the other being "Don't Walk Away") to be entirely written by an outside writer without help from at least one member of the band. "Best of What I Got" was released as a promotional single to Rock Radio, where the tune cracked the top 10.

The Summer of 1989 saw the band as a support act for Bon Jovi on their mammoth Jersey Syndicate world tour. March to June 1990 saw the band toured across the US with Whitesnake in support of the album.

=== Second album ===
The band's second album, Backlash, came and went without any fanfare. The only single, "Straight to Your Heart", missed the top 40, peaking at number 42. Ricky Phillips writes on his website that the group had parted company before the second album had been mixed. Both Phillips and guitarist Neal Schon expressed frustration with the "pop" side of the band's music and wanted a harder edge. In the end, it proved to be the band's undoing as everyone left to pursue other projects.

=== Breakup ===
In later interviews, Waite revealed that although he loved playing to stadium-sized audiences, he was uncomfortable with the corporate rock image that he felt the band had presented. He returned to working as a solo artist. Schon and Castronovo joined the fledgling rock band Hardline in 1991; however, both would leave the group not long after the release of its debut album, with Schon pursuing other projects and Castronovo joining Ozzy Osbourne's band. In the mid-1990s, Schon rejoined Cain, who had released two solo albums in the interim, in a reformed Journey. Castronovo also joined Journey in 1998, eventually leaving in 2015. He later became a member of the Dead Daisies and Revolution Saints before returning to Journey in 2021. Meanwhile, Phillips returned to session work, recording with artists such as Coverdale/Page, Bobby Kimball and Eddie Money before joining Styx in the early 2000s.

== In popular culture ==
"Best of What I Got", from the band's first album, is featured during the credits to the 1989 movie Tango & Cash starring Sylvester Stallone and Kurt Russell.

== Personnel ==
=== Members ===
- John Waite – lead vocals, occasional guitar
- Neal Schon – lead guitar, backing vocals
- Jonathan Cain – keyboards, piano, rhythm guitar, backing vocals
- Ricky Phillips – bass, backing vocals
- Deen Castronovo – drums, percussion, backing vocals

== Discography ==
=== Studio albums ===
Year	Album details	Peak chart positions						Certifications (sales threshold)
Year	Album details	US	AUS	CAN	SWE	SWI	UK	Certifications (sales threshold)
1989	Bad English: Release date: June 1989; Label: Epic Records	21	12	34	39	—	74	US: Platinum; CAN: Gold
1991	Backlash: Release date: August 1991; Label: Epic Records	72	159	34	21	30	64	
"—" denotes releases that did not chart

=== Compilation albums ===
Year	Album details
1995	Greatest Hits: Label: Epic Records

=== Singles ===
Year	Single	Peak chart positions						Certifications (sales threshold)	Album
Year	Single	US	US AC	US Main	AUS	UK	NL	Certifications (sales threshold)	Album
1989	"Forget Me Not"	45	—	2	—	—	—		Bad English
1989	"When I See You Smile"	1	11	10	4	61	—	US: Gold; AUS: Platinum	Bad English
1989	"Price of Love"	5	38	30	44	80	—		Bad English
1989	"Best of What I Got"	—	—	9	—	—	—		Bad English
1990	"Heaven Is a 4 Letter Word"	66	—	12	124	—	—		Bad English
1990	"Possession"	21	42	—	—	—	—		Bad English
1990	"Don't Walk Away"	—	—	—	—	110	—		Bad English
1991	"Straight to Your Heart"	42	—	9	116	—	41		Backlash
1991	"Time Stood Still"	—	—	—	—	—	19		Backlash
"—" denotes releases that did not chart or not released to that country
