= Single (Bill Champlin album) =

Studio album by Bill Champlin
- Released: July 9, 1978
- Recorded: 1977–1978
- Studios: Davlen Sound Studios (North Hollywood); Sound Labs (Hollywood)
- Genres: Rock; funk
- Length: 37:10
- Label: Full Moon
- Producer: David Foster

Bill Champlin chronology
Single (1978)	Runaway (1981)

Single is the debut studio album by Bill Champlin, released on Full Moon Records in 1978.

== History ==
The album was his first after leaving the Sons of Champlin in 1977 to pursue a solo career in Los Angeles as a session vocalist and songwriter.

The album was produced by David Foster, who Champlin would continue to work with extensively over the next decade. The musicians on the album include the original lineup of the band Toto, who would release their debut album a few months later. Guest backing vocalists also include Michael McDonald and Daryl Hall.

== Track listing ==
All tracks are written by Bill Champlin, except where noted.

Side one
No.	Title	Writer(s)	Length
1.	"What Good Is Love"	Jay Graydon; Harry Garfield	3:40
2.	"I Don't Want You Anymore"	Champlin; David Foster	3:56
3.	"We Both Tried"	Champlin; David Foster	4:56
4.	"Yo Mama"		4:09
5.	"Fly with Me"		3:59

Side two
No.	Title	Writer(s)	Length
6.	"Love Is Forever"		3:59
7.	"Carless"	Champlin; B.J. Cook	3:53
8.	"Elayne"	Champlin; Ed Whiting	3:30
9.	"Keys to the Kingdom"	Champlin; Foster	5:08
Total length:			37:10

== Personnel ==
Adapted from the album's liner notes.

- Bill Champlin – lead vocals, backing vocals, guitar, keyboards
- David Foster – piano, keyboards, synthesizers
- David Paich – keyboards, synthesizers
- Steve Porcaro – synthesizer programming
- Jay Graydon – guitars, synthesizer programming
- Ray Parker Jr. – guitars
- Steve Lukather – guitars
- David Hungate – bass
- David Shields – bass
- Jeff Porcaro – drums
- Larry Tolbert – drums
- Duris Maxwell – drums
- Paulinho da Costa – percussion
- Jerry Hey – trumpet, horn arrangements
- Gary Grant – trumpet
- Oscar Brashear – trumpet
- Larry Williams – saxophone
- Bruce Paulson – trombone
- George Bohanon – trombone
- Harry Bluestone – concertmaster
- Marty Paich – conductor
- Frank DeCaro Orchestra – string contractor
- Carmen Twillie – backing vocals
- Venette Gloud – backing vocals
- Bobby Kimball – backing vocals
- Michael McDonald – backing vocals
- Daryl Hall – backing vocals

=== Technical ===
- Produced by David Foster
- Arranged by David Foster and Bill Champlin
- Engineered and mixed by Humberto Gatica
- Second engineers (at Davlen) – Patrick Von Wiegandt and Chris Desmond
- Second engineers (at Sound Labs) – John Sands, Linda Tyler, and Deborah Simpson
- Additional overdub engineers – Jay Lewis and Paul Dobbe
- Mastered by Bernie Grundman at A&M Studios (Hollywood, CA)
- Art direction and design – Tony Lane
- Photography – Reid Miles
