= Runaway (Bill Champlin album) =

Studio album by Bill Champlin
- Released: January 8, 1982
- Recorded: 1981
- Studios: Sunset Sound (Hollywood): Santa Monica Sound (Santa Monica); Monterey Sound (Glendale); Davlen Studios (North Hollywood); Sound Labs (Hollywood); Studio 55 (Hollywood)
- Genres: Rock; adult contemporary
- Length: 39:22
- Label: Elektra
- Producers: David Foster; Kenny Loggins

Bill Champlin chronology
Single (1978)	Runaway (1982)	No Wasted Moments (1990)

Runaway is the second studio album by Bill Champlin, released on Elektra Records on January 8, 1982. It is notable as containing "Tonight Tonight", Champlin's minor hit as a solo artist, as well as "Sara", which also achieved a degree of chart success.

== History ==
The album was released as component of Champlin's development of his solo career, following his longtime association with the Sons of Champlin. Champlin's first solo album, Single, had been released in 1978, on Full Moon Records, following Champlin's departure from the Sons of Champlin in 1977. Runaway was also released in the same year that Champlin commenced a near thirty-year association with Chicago. According to Champlin, Runaway prompted his decision to join Chicago, due to the record executive overseeing his project leaving Elektra on the day of its release. On Champlin's first tour with Chicago, they performed the song "Satisfaction" from this album.

The album received mixed reviews, based on critics viewing it as a weaker version of Chicago material that Champlin was contributing to at the same time. The album has been described as an "historic curio, a period artifact, and not much more".

The album was primarily produced by David Foster, who had also produced Champlin's previous solo album, Single, in 1978. The album also featured production by Kenny Loggins on "Take It Uptown", co-written by Loggins and Champlin. One of the comparatively rare songwriting collaborations with Alan Thicke is also included on the album--"Sara", co-written with Champlin. The single "Tonight Tonight" was originally composed as the ballad "My Everlasting Love" on the self-titled second album from Ray Kennedy, a song which Champlin contributed background vocals on.

The album entered the Billboard album chart on February 6, 1982. It spent 4 weeks on the chart, peaking at #178.

Despite initially mixed critical reaction, the album was re-released on CD by Warner Bros. in 1996, and as a Japanese export as of 1998.

The album track "Gotta Get Back to Love" would later be covered by R&B group Sister Sledge on their 1983 George Duke produced album Bet Cha Say That to All the Girls. Champlin's last solo album for a major label, No Wasted Moments (Elektra), was released in 1990.

== Track listing ==
Side one
No.	Title	Writer(s)	Length
1.	"Runaway"	Bill Champlin; Steve Lukather	3:58
2.	"One Way Ticket"	Champlin; George Sopuch	3:03
3.	"Sara"	Champlin; Alan Thicke	3:15
4.	"Tonight Tonight"	Champlin; David Foster; Ray Kennedy	3:47
5.	"Runaway Reprise"	Champlin; Foster	0:47
6.	"Take It Uptown"	Champlin; Kenny Loggins	4:24

Side two
No.	Title	Writer(s)	Length
7.	"Satisfaction"	Champlin; Richard Page	3:42
8.	"Stop Knockin' on My Door"	Champlin; Barron Abramovich	4:16
9.	"Gotta Get Back to Love"	Tom Kelly; Kerry Hatch	3:30
10.	"Without You"	Champlin; Amber DiLena	4:05
11.	"The Fool Is All Alone"	Champlin; Foster	4:29
Total length:			39:22

== Personnel ==
- Bill Champlin – lead vocals, backing vocals (1–3, 6–11), string arrangements (4, 9), piano (5, 6, 8), guitars (5), lead guitar (8), Hammond organ (8)
- David Foster – synthesizers (1, 3, 5, 7, 9, 11), backing vocals (1, 4), string arrangements (1, 3, 7, 9), keyboards (2–4, 10), Moog bass (5, 7), Linn Drum (5), Fender Rhodes (6–8), piano (9, 11)
- Steve Lukather – guitars (1–3, 7, 10), rhythm guitar (8), lead guitar (9)
- Jay Graydon – guitars (4, 6, 11), rhythm guitar (9)
- John Pierce – bass (1–3, 6, 8, 11)
- Abraham Laboriel – bass (4, 9)
- Leland Sklar – bass (10)
- John Robinson – drums (1, 3, 6–8, 11)
- Ed Greene – drums (2)
- Larry Tolbert – drums (4, 9)
- Jeff Porcaro – drums (10)
- Paul Lani – percussion (3, 7)
- Humberto Gatica – percussion (4, 9), tambourine (8), snare sound (8)
- Jerry Hey – flugelhorn (4), horn arrangements (6, 7), trumpet (7)
- Gary Herbig – tenor saxophone (4), saxophone (7)
- Tom Scott – tenor saxophone (6)
- Kim Hutchcroft – saxophone (7)
- Larry Williams – saxophone (7)
- Chuck Findley – trumpet (7)
- Gary Grant – trumpet (7)
- Bill Reichenbach Jr. – trombone (7)
- Charlie Loper – trombone (7)
- James Newton Howard – string arrangements (11)
- Harry Bluestone – concertmaster (4)
- Tom Kelly – backing vocals (1, 9)
- Richard Page – backing vocals (2, 4, 7, 9, 11)
- Venette Gloud – backing vocals (4)
- Kenny Loggins – backing vocals (6)
- Carmen Grillo – backing vocals (8)
- Tamara Matoesian – backing vocals (8)

=== Technical ===
- Produced by David Foster and Kenny Loggins (6)
- Engineered and mixed by Humberto Gatica
- Arranged by David Foster and Bill Champlin
- Second engineers – David Leonard, Paul Lani, Peggy McCreary, Tony Pappa, Patrick Von Wiegandt, and Ernie Sheesley
- Additional engineers – Paul Lani and David Leonard
- Photography – Aaron Rapoport
- Art direction and design – John Kosh
- Representation – John Baruck Management Inc. / Alex Kochan
