= Price of Love (Bad English song) =

Single by Bad English

from the album Bad English
- B-side: "The Restless Ones"
- Released: 1989
- Recorded: 1989
- Genre: Glam metal, hard rock, AOR
- Length: 4:48
- Label: Epic
- Songwriters: Jonathan Cain, John Waite
- Producer: Richie Zito

"Price of Love" is a song by American/British band Bad English, released as the third single from their 1989 self-titled debut album of the same name. The power ballad reached number five on the U.S. Billboard Hot 100 in March 1990. It also charted in the top 40 of the Billboard Adult Contemporary and Mainstream Rock charts. In Australia, the song reached No. 44.

== Music video ==
The music video for the song featured alternating scenes of lead singer John Waite standing with various moving cityscapes in the background and scenes of the band performing on a stage.

== Charts ==
Chart (1989–1990)	Peak position
Australia (ARIA)	44
Canada Top Singles (RPM)	78
Italy Airplay (Music & Media)	19
UK Singles (Official Charts)	80
US Billboard Hot 100	5
US Adult Contemporary (Billboard)	38
US Mainstream Rock (Billboard)	30
