= Broken Heart (album) =

Studio album by The Babys
- Released: 9 September 1977
- Recorded: 1976–1977
- Studios: Record Plant, Los Angeles, Hidden Valley Ranch Studio
- Genres: Rock, Hard rock, AOR
- Length: 37:19
- Label: Chrysalis
- Producer: Ron Nevison

The Babys chronology
The Babys (1976)	Broken Heart (1977)	Head First (1978)

Professional ratings
Review scores
Source	Rating
Allmusic	3.0/5 stars

Broken Heart is The Babys second album, released in September 1977. The album produced The Babys first big hit "Isn't It Time", which reached No. 13 on the Billboard Hot 100 and No. 9 on the Australian chart in 1977. Broken Heart was later released as a double album with the self-titled album The Babys.

== Album information ==
Producer Ron Nevison seemed to help create a clearer sound and the album ranges from frantic guitar and drum solos to quiet ballads like "Silver Dreams". Waite's vocals received greater attention than in the previous album where they sounded impressive but distant.

Sales of 400,0000 copies were reported for the album Broken Heart.

Songwriters outside the group were included with songs by Jack Conrad and Ray Kennedy, Mike Japp and Chas Sandford.

== Track listing ==
1. "Wrong or Right" (John Waite) – 3:26
2. "Give Me Your Love" (Waite, Wally Stocker, Michael Corby, Tony Brock) – 3:37
3. "Isn't It Time?" (Jack Conrad, Ray Kennedy) – 4:03
4. "And If You Could See Me Fly" (Waite, Brock, Corby, Stocker) – 2:50
5. "The Golden Mile" (Waite, Brock) – 5:01
6. "Broken Heart" (Waite) – 3:02
7. "I'm Falling" (Waite, Corby) – 3:55
8. "Rescue Me" (Waite, Brock, Corby, Stocker) – 3:50
9. "Silver Dreams" (Brock, Waite) – 3:00
10. "A Piece of the Action" (Mike Japp, Chas Sandford) – 4:35

== Personnel ==
- John Waite – lead vocals and bass
- Michael Corby – rhythm guitar and keyboards
- Wally Stocker – lead guitar
- Tony Brock – drums and backing vocals, lead vocals and piano (9)

=== Additional personnel ===
- The Babettes (Lisa Freeman Roberts, Pat Henderson, Myrna Mathews) – backing vocals
- Alan MacMillan - string and horn arrangements

Technical

- Recorded by Mike Beiriger, Pete Carlson, Ron Nevison
- Charles William Bush - design, photography
