= Ricky Phillips =

American bassist

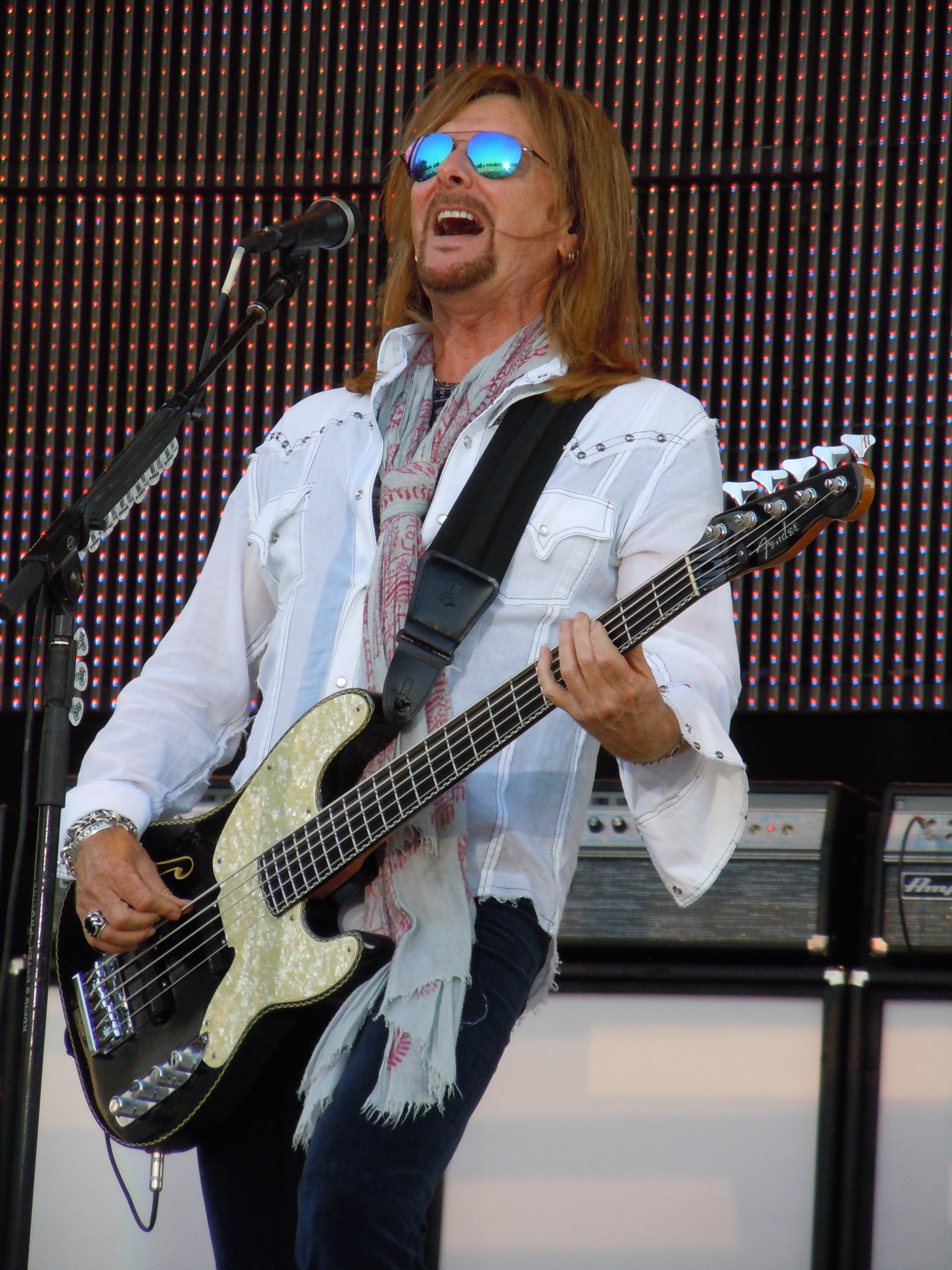
- Phillips performing with Styx in 2010

Background information
- Born: Ricky Lynn Phillips; October 7, 1952 (age 73); Mount Pleasant, Iowa, U.S.
- Genres: Hard rock; progressive rock
- Occupation: Musician
- Instruments: Bass guitar; guitar
- Years active: 1970–present
- Website: rickyphillips.com

Ricky Lynn Phillips (born October 7, 1952) is an American bass guitarist and was a member of the rock band Styx from 2003 to 2024, splitting duties with original bassist Chuck Panozzo. He has also played in Nasty Habit, as a member of the Babys and Bad English, and with Coverdale-Page and Ted Nugent.

Phillips and his former Bad English bandmate Neal Schon also played with former Montrose members Sammy Hagar and Denny Carmassi on a live version of the Montrose song "Rock Candy".

== Discography ==
=== With the Babys ===
- Union Jacks
- On The Edge

=== With Bad English ===
- Bad English
- Backlash

=== With Styx ===
- Big Bang Theory
- One with Everything: Styx and the Contemporary Youth Orchestra
- The Mission
- Crash of the Crown

=== With Ronnie Montrose ===
- 10x10 - Producer, Bass, Hammond organ, Lead and Backing Vocals, Guitar

=== With Coverdale/Page ===
- Coverdale/Page
