= Rood (song) =

Single by Marco Borsato

from the album Symphonica in Rosso
- Released: 5 May 2006
- Recorded: 2006
- Genre: Pop
- Length: 5:20
- Label: Universal Music
- Songwriter(s): John Ewbank
- Producer(s): John Ewbank

Marco Borsato singles chronology
"Because We Believe" (2006)	"Rood" (2006)	"Everytime I Think of You" (2006)

Music video
- "Rood" (Official) on YouTube

Rood (English: Red) is a single by Dutch artist Marco Borsato from his album Symphonica in Rosso. The song was written and produced by John Ewbank. It reached the number-one position in both the Dutch charts (the Dutch Top 40 and the Mega Single Top 100) and the Flemish Ultratop 50.

== Chart performance ==
=== Weekly charts ===
Chart (2006)	Peak position
Belgium (Ultratop 50 Flanders)	1
Netherlands (Dutch Top 40)	1
Netherlands (Single Top 100)	1

=== Year-end charts ===
Chart (2006)	Position
Belgium (Ultratop Flanders)	1
Netherlands (Dutch Top 40)	2
Netherlands (Single Top 100)	1
Chart (2007)	Position
Belgium (Ultratop Flanders)	61

=== Decade-end charts ===
Chart (2000–2009)	Position
Netherlands (Single Top 100)	4
