= The Babys =

British rock band

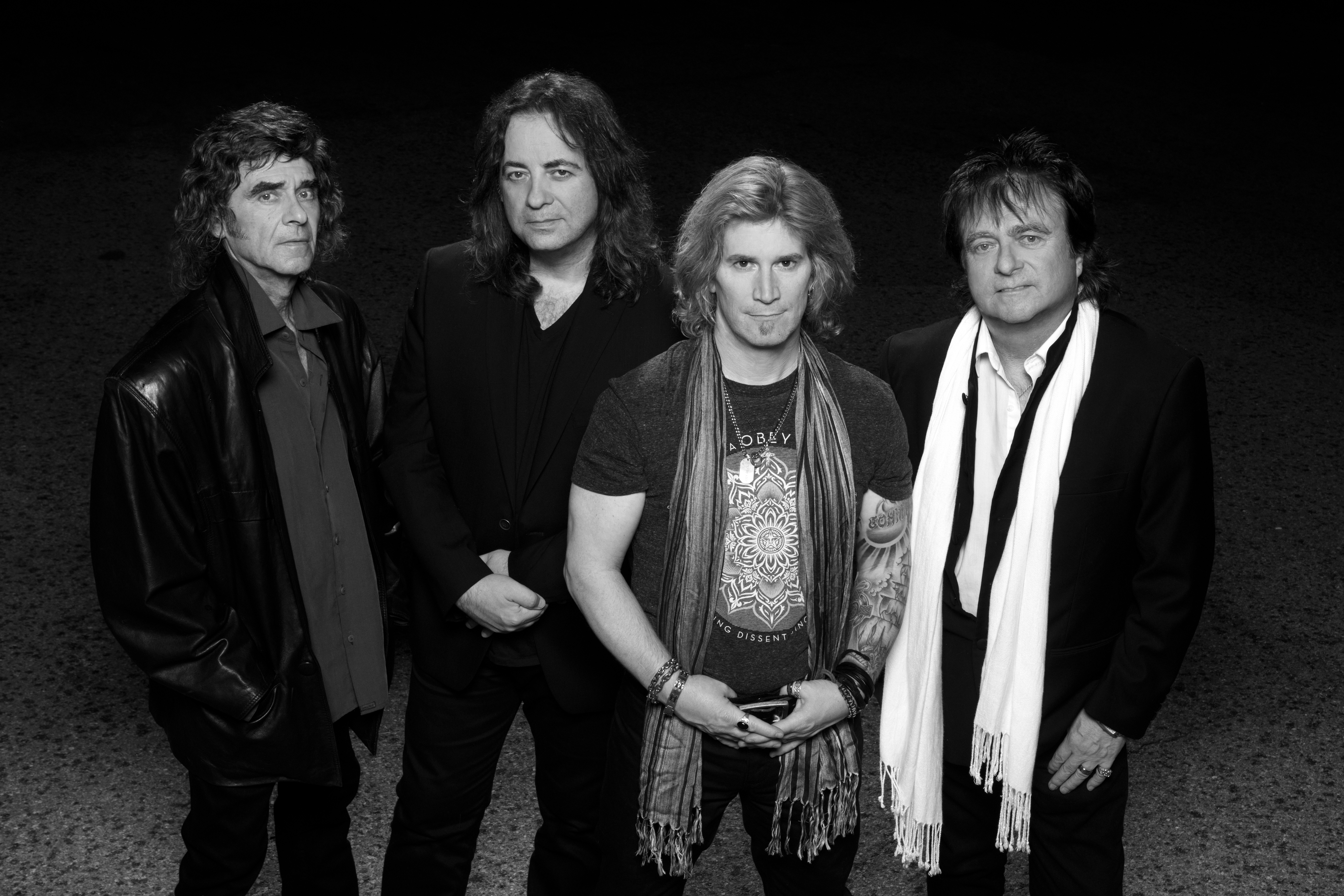
- Group photo of the Babys in 2013

Background information
- Origin: London, England
- Genres: Pop rock, hard rock, power pop
- Years active: 1975–1981, 2013–present
- Label: Chrysalis
- Members: Wally Stocker; Tony Brock; John Bisaha; Joey Sykes; Walter Ino; Holly Bisaha; Elisa Chadbourne
- Past members: Michael Corby; John Waite; Matt Irving; Jonathan Cain; Ricky Phillips; J. P. Cervoni; Eric Ragno; Francesco Saglietti; Louis Middleton
- Website: thebabysofficial.com

The Babys are a British rock group best known for their songs "Isn't It Time" and "Every Time I Think of You". Both songs were composed by Jack Conrad and Ray Kennedy, and each reached No. 13 on the U.S. Billboard Hot 100 and No. 8 on the Cashbox chart in the late 1970s. "Back on My Feet Again" also reached the U.S. Top 40 in 1980. The original Babys line-up consisted of founding member keyboardist/guitarist Michael Corby, and in order of joining the group, vocalist/bassist John Waite, drummer Tony Brock and guitarist Wally Stocker.

The group signed a contract with Chrysalis Records that was the highest ever for a new music act at the time. Two studio albums, The Babys and Broken Heart, were well received. After recording their third album, Head First, in 1978, co-founder Michael Corby was replaced by Jonathan Cain as keyboardist and Ricky Phillips took over as bassist. From late 1978 until the breakup in 1981, The Babys line-up consisted of vocalist Waite, drummer Brock, bassist Phillips, guitarist Stocker, and keyboardist Cain.

== Origin and name ==
Founding member Mike Corby places the origin of the idea for the band at Smalls Café on the Fulham Road in London in 1973, during a chance meeting with Adrian Millar. A management agreement was signed between Corby and Millar on 4 September 1974 and auditions were held in 1974–75 to fill out the remaining members.

Among those who auditioned were Mandrake Paddle Steamer bassist Paul Riordan and drummer Lucas Fox, who would go on to join Motörhead. One of their friends, singer/guitarist Gordon Hawtin (a.k.a. Gordon Rondelle), recommended an acquaintance, John Waite (ex-Graf Spee/Chalk Farm), who had relocated to Cleveland, Ohio, to play bass with a band called The Boys, but returned to the UK to try out for Corby's new project. Riordin decided to pass and drummer Tony Brock was pursued instead of Fox.

Tony Brock was an established rock drummer, having played with Strider and Spontaneous Combustion. Financial difficulties with Strider, and the opportunity to join a group with sound financial backing, made him decide to take a chance with this group instead. Brock brought in ex-Dream Police/Longdancer keyboardist/guitarist/bassist Matt Irving in late 1975, but Corby left temporarily shortly thereafter. The last member to join the line-up was ex-Joy/Pegasus guitarist Wally Stocker, in January 1976. After Corby then returned, rehearsals began in London's Tooley Street and ten songs were demoed. These ten songs were later first released on NEMS Records in 1978 as The Babys (and later, in 2006, as The Official Unofficial BABYS Album). But Irving was the next to leave (eventually to join Manfred Mann's Earth Band).

As of late 1975, Adrian Millar's girlfriend suggested The Babys and the unusual spelling stuck. Corby liked it because "it would piss mindless critics off." Another version surfaced in a 1979 Hit Parader interview where Waite claimed

"The name was meant to be a joke. We took the name simply because the record companies wouldn't listen to any bands they thought were rock & roll. I mean, they wanted sure-fire teen bands, pre-teen bands. We couldn't get anybody down to hear us to get a record deal, so we called ourselves The Babys. We thought we'd keep the name just for two weeks. Then, the word got around in London that there was a band playing rock & roll called The Babys and it seemed so off the wall, so completely crazy, that it was worth taking a shot with. It really appealed to everyone's sense of humour."

Music videos were produced by Mike Mansfield for Supersonic, and Chrysalis Records signed the band in July 1976.

== Career ==
The Babys' eponymous first album (highlighted by the single "If You've Got the Time") was recorded in Toronto, Ontario, Canada, with producers Brian Christian and Bob Ezrin and released in December 1976, although it appears that Millar and Corby were unhappy with the production and mix.

In 1977 the band purchased a 24-track mobile unit with which to record their music. They went to a ranch house in the Malibu mountains and laid down the tracks in six weeks. However, the record sleeve says it was recorded at the famous Sound City in Southern California. The influences of the songs came about from their first year in Los Angeles and the culture shock of their relocation there.

Their second album, Broken Heart, (released in September 1977) featured production by Ron Nevison and resulted in gaining the group a Top 20 U.S. hit, "Isn't It Time" (written by Jack Conrad and Ray Kennedy), that peaked at No. 13 on the Billboard chart. The song was a departure from the group's desire to only play their own material. Other writers' material, such as Mike Japp and Chas Sandford's "A Piece of the Action", was included. The album featured unique acoustic openings on "I'm Falling" and "Wrong or Right". Nevison's production techniques enhanced Waite's emerging talent as a vocalist and highlighted Brock's drumming, Stocker's guitar work and Corby's instrumental abilities. The band continued to tour the U.S. successfully with The Babettes, which included singers from Andrae Crouch and the Disciples: Lisa Freeman Roberts, Myrna Matthews and Pat Henderson. The album spent two weeks at number one in Australia and produced a number one single with "Isn't It Time".

Disputes with Chrysalis management resulted in the firing of the band's original manager Adrian Millar in 1977. And Corby too was fired on August 28, 1978, after differences with Waite and Lookout Management, who had taken over from Millar.

Chrysalis had re-teamed the band with Ron Nevison, but there was disagreement on whether to focus on rockers or ballads. Consequently, Head First was recorded in a pressure-cooker environment with the Record Plant 24-track mobile at Hidden Valley Ranch in Malibu. Corby had imagined more of a "progressive rock type" of album, while Waite was moving towards more country-oriented material (evidenced by outtakes "Restless Heart" and "World In A Bottle"). The band had spent $300,000 in six weeks. But the album was rejected by Chrysalis and an irate Corby was shocked to find songs on there he had never played on or heard of before.

Some two weeks later, after Corby had been let go, the remaining trio returned to the studio in an effort to revamp Head First, its release delayed to the end of the year. They re-recorded it in stripped-back form, Corby's contributions relegated to keyboards only, while they added a swaggering opener, "Love Don’t Prove I’m Right", plus the visceral, gospel-backed Jack Conrad/Ray Kennedy followup, "Every Time I Think Of You", which hit US No 13.

Equipment Manager Ray Sheriff states:

"Almost immediately after Michael's leaving, the remainder of the band went into auditions for a replacement. Jonathan Cain, in fact, became Mike’s successor, but I am sure he had not been selected until after Mike left. The other musician was Ricky Phillips, who played bass. I think from what John, Wally and Tony said that it was they, and not Chrysalis, who selected these two successors, and I think that at about this same time Lookout Management ceased to be the band's managers."

As stated above, two American musicians became a part of the lineup following the release of the third album, Head First. Keyboardist/guitarist/vocalist Jonathan Cain replaced Corby, and bassist Ricky Phillips (of Nasty Habit) joined in the late fall of 1978, making it a five-piece band. The new quintet made their debut at the Whisky a Go Go on 31 December 1978. And the new lineup toured through the winter and spring of 1979 as the opening act for Alice Cooper.

The band's fourth album, Union Jacks, (released in January 1980), produced by Keith Olsen, had a more punchy sound; the single, "Back on My Feet Again," spent a short time in the Top 40. And Anne Marie Leclerc (a.k.a. Anne Bertucci), who guested on Union Jacks, appeared as a backup singer on tour with the band in 1979–1980. During an extensive tour in 1980, The Babys opened for Journey, the band that Jonathan Cain would soon join. And the band's fifth album, On the Edge, was made during the 1980 tour and released in October 1980. The single, "Turn and Walk Away", peaked at No. 42 on the Hot 100.

During a performance in Cincinnati, Ohio on 9 December 1980 (the day after John Lennon had been murdered), John Waite was pulled from the stage by an overzealous fan during an encore and seriously injured his knee. After a final performance by the group in Akron, Ohio with Waite attempting to perform on crutches, the remainder of the tour was cancelled, Cain left for Journey, Waite for a solo career and the rest of the group disbanded in early 1981 after being dropped by Chrysalis. Although different members of the group have given various reasons for the band's demise, the general issue seems to have been disillusionment that the group never really achieved the success they felt they deserved given the quality of their albums and live shows.

== Aftermath ==
Jonathan Cain had joined Journey just as that band was on the verge of mainstream success. John Waite embarked on a successful solo career, peaking with a number one American hit in 1984 with Chas Sandford and Mark Leonard's "Missing You" from his second solo album No Brakes." Waite and Cain reunited with Ricky Phillips at the end of the 1980s to form the hard rock/glam rock-infused supergroup Bad English, scoring several hits from their 1989 self-titled album. Tony Brock spent many years drumming for Rod Stewart, as well as drumming and co-producing for Jimmy Barnes and producing for Keith Urban. Wally Stocker went on to join Brock in Rod Stewart's band and briefly joined Air Supply in the mid-1980s, later playing in a reformed version of Humble Pie in the 1990s. Phillips played with Styx for over 20 years, from 2003 to early 2024.

The Babys' original manager, Adrian Millar, died on 10 December 2006 at the age of 58.

== Reforming the Babys ==
Starting in 2003, there was an attempt by original Babys founder Michael Corby (now living in Scotland) to reunite the classic lineup of himself, John Waite, Tony Brock and Wally Stocker. But that fell through when the other three were not interested.

In 2013, the Babys re-formed with originals Brock and Stocker, and two new members - American John Bisaha on vocals and bass, along with American guitarist Joey Sykes, who replaced J. P. Cervoni after his brief tenure. The new look Babys debuted in the summer of 2013 at the Canyon Club in Agoura Hills, California and included new Babettes, Holly Bisaha and Elisa Chadbourne.

In June 2014 their latest album, I'll Have Some of That!, was released and since that time, the reunion has continued with the group playing at least a handful of dates in the U.S. each year, with a revolving door of keyboardists, Francesco Saglietti (2013–2015, 2016–2018), Eric Ragno (2015), Brian Johnson (2015–2016), Louis Middleton (2018–2019) and Walter Ino (2019–present). Since 2022, singer Bisaha has also been playing with Firefall.

== Band members ==
- Wally Stocker – lead guitar (1975–1981, 2013–present)
- Tony Brock – drums, occasional piano (1975–1981, 2013–present), backing and occasional lead vocals (1975–78)
- John Bisaha – lead vocals, bass (2013–present)
- Joey Sykes – rhythm guitar, backing vocals, mandolin (2013–present)

=== Touring members ===
- Holly Bisaha – backing vocals (2013–present)
- Elisa Chadbourne – backing vocals (2013–present)
- Francesco Saglietti – keyboards (2013–2015, 2016–2018)
- Eric Ragno – keyboards (2015)
- Brian Johnson – keyboards (2015–2016)
- Louis Middleton – keyboards (2018–2019)
- Walter Ino – keyboards (2019–present)

=== Former members ===
- John Waite – lead vocals (1975–1981), bass (1975–1979)
- Michael Corby – keyboards, rhythm guitar (1975–1978)
- Matt Irving – guitar, bass, keyboards, backing vocals (1975–1976)
- Jonathan Cain – keyboards, backing and occasional lead vocals (1979–1980), rhythm guitar (1980)
- Ricky Phillips – bass guitar, backing vocals (1979–1981)
- J. P. Cervoni – rhythm guitar, backing vocals (2013)

1975–1976	1976–1978	1978–1979	1979–1980
John Waite – lead vocals; Michael Corby – keyboards, guitar; Matt Irving – guitar, bass, keyboards, backing vocals; Tony Brock – drums, vocals, piano	John Waite – lead vocals, bass; Wally Stocker – lead guitar; Michael Corby – keyboards, rhythm guitar; Tony Brock – drums, vocals, piano	John Waite – lead vocals, bass; Wally Stocker – lead and rhythm guitar; Tony Brock – drums, vocals, piano	John Waite – lead vocals; Wally Stocker – lead guitar; Jonathan Cain – keyboards, backing vocals, rhythm guitar; Ricky Phillips – bass; Tony Brock – drums, vocals, piano
1980–2012	2013	2013–2015	2015
disbanded	John Bisaha – lead vocals, bass; Wally Stocker – lead guitar; J. P. Cervoni – rhythm guitar, backing vocals; Francescs Sagleitti – keyboards; Tony Brock – drums; Holly Bisaha – backing vocals; Elisa Chadbourne – backing vocals	John Bisaha – lead vocals, bass; Wally Stocker – lead guitar; Joey Sykes – rhythm guitar, backing vocals; Francescs Sagleitti – keyboards; Tony Brock – drums; Holly Bisaha – backing vocals; Elisa Chadbourne – backing vocals	John Bisaha – lead vocals, bass; Wally Stocker – lead guitar; Joey Sykes – rhythm guitar, backing vocals; Eric Ragno – keyboards; Tony Brock – drums; Holly Bisaha – backing vocals; Elisa Chadbourne – backing vocals
2015–2016	2016–2018	2018–2019	2019–present
John Bisaha – lead vocals, bass; Wally Stocker – lead guitar; Joey Sykes – rhythm guitar, backing vocals; Brian Johnson – keyboards; Tony Brock – drums; Holly Bisaha – backing vocals; Elisa Chadbourne – backing vocals	John Bisaha – lead vocals, bass; Wally Stocker – lead guitar; Joey Sykes – rhythm guitar, backing vocals; Francescs Sagleitti – keyboards; Tony Brock – drums; Holly Bisaha – backing vocals; Elisa Chadbourne – backing vocals	John Bisaha – lead vocals, bass; Wally Stocker – lead guitar; Joey Sykes – rhythm guitar, backing vocals; Louis Middleton – keyboards; Tony Brock – drums; Holly Bisaha – backing vocals; Elisa Chadbourne – backing vocals	John Bisaha – lead vocals, bass; Wally Stocker – lead guitar; Joey Sykes – rhythm guitar, backing vocals; Walter Ino – keyboards; Tony Brock – drums; Holly Bisaha – backing vocals; Elisa Chadbourne – backing vocals

== Discography ==
=== Albums ===
Year	Album	AUS	US	NLD	Record label
1976	The Babys	—	133	—	Chrysalis
1977	Broken Heart	9	34	9	Chrysalis
1978	Head First	18	22	7	Chrysalis
1980	Union Jacks	58	42	46	Chrysalis
1980	On the Edge	98	71	—	Chrysalis
1981	Anthology (compilation album)	73	138	—	Chrysalis
2001	Valentine Babys (live album)	—	—	—	EMI
2008	Live in America (remastered expanded reissue of Valentine Babys)	—	—	—	Indie Europe/Zoom
2014	I'll Have Some of That!	—	—	—	Indie - All in Time Records (iTunes/Amazon/Stores)

=== Singles ===
Year	Single	Peak chart positions					Certification	Album
Year	Single	U.S.	CAN	UK	AUS	NLD	Certification	Album
1977	"If You've Got the Time"	88	—	—	—	—		The Babys
1977	"Isn't It Time"	13	8	45	1	7	AUS: Gold	Broken Heart
1978	"Silver Dreams"	53	53	—	—	—		Broken Heart
1978	"A Piece of the Action"	—	—	—	—	12		Broken Heart
1978	"Every Time I Think of You"	13	8	—	6	11		Head First
1979	"Head First"	77	—	—	—	—		Head First
1979	"True Love True Confessions"	—	—	—	—	—		Union Jacks
1979	"Back on My Feet Again"	33	29	—	92	—		Union Jacks
1980	"Midnight Rendezvous"	72	—	—	—	—		Union Jacks
1980	"Turn and Walk Away"	42	15	—	—	—		On the Edge
