= X Factor (Belgian TV series) =

Belgian TV show

- Presenters: Koen Wauters; Hadise (Series 2)
- Judges: Jean Blaute (Groups); Kris Wauters (+25); Liliane Saint-Pierre (16-24); Do (Groups, Series 2)

Season 1 (2005) contestants
- Winner: Udo Mechels (25+); Runner-up: The Cappaert Sisters (Group); 3rd: Ivann (16-24); 4th: Paco Garcia (16-24); 5th: Patrick & Carina (Group); 6th: Helena Fontyn (25+); 7th: Alexander Chiafele (16-24); 8th: Robin Danneels (25+); 9th: Davy Lakomy (16-24); 10th: Three Cats (Group); 11th: Véronique Flamand (25+); 12th: Rm'Ny (Group)

Season 2 (2008) contestants
- Winner: Dirk De Smet (25+); Runner-up: Tom Eeckhout (16-24); 3rd: Lester & Abdou (Group); 4th: Mathieu & Guillaume Engels (Group); 5th: Karim Lequenne (16-24); 6th: Elien Roosen (25+); 7th: Lady-Like (Group); 8th: Jurgen De Jaegher (25+); 9th: Stefanie Schaekers (16-24); 10th: Rodwan Balkaïd (16-24); 11th: Miss Behave (Group); 12th: Andy De Koker (25+)

X Factor was the Flemish version of the British show The X Factor, created by Simon Cowell. The new X Factor series was a successor to Idool which features contestants & jury members from both seasons.

== Judges' categories and their contestants ==
In each season, each judge is allocated a category to mentor and chooses three acts to progress to the live shows. This table shows, for each season, which category each judge was allocated and which acts he or she put through to the live shows.

Key:

– Winning judge/category. Winners are in bold, eliminated contestants in small font.

Season	Jean Blaute	Kris Wauters	Liliane Saint-Pierre
One	**Groups**; The Cappaert Sisters; Patrick & Carina; Three Cats; Rm'Ny	**Over 25s** **Udo Mechels**; Helena Fontyn; Robin Daneels; Véronique Flamand	**16-24s** Ivann; Paco Garcia; Alexander Chiafele; Davy Lakomy
Season	Maurice Engelen	Kris Wauters	Do
Two	**16-24s** Tom Eeckhout; Karim Lequenne; Stefanie Schaekers; Rodwan Balkaïd	**Over 25s** **Dirk De Smet**; Elien Roosen; Jurgen De Jaegher; Andy De Koker	**Groups**; Lester & Abdou; Mathieu & Guillaume Engels; Lady-Like; Miss Behave

== Series overview ==
"Under 25 boys" category
"Under 25 girls" category
"16-24s" category
"Over 25s" category
"Groups" category

Season	Air date	Winner	Runner-up	Third place	Host(s)	Judges	Winning mentor
One	2005	Udo Mechels	The Cappaert Sisters	Ivann	Koen Wauters	Jean Blaute; Kris Wauters; Liliane Saint-Pierre	Kris Wauters
Two	2008	Dirk De Smet	Tom Eeckhout	Lester & Abdou	Hadise	Kris Wauters; Do; Maurice Engelen	Kris Wauters

== Season 1 (2005) ==
The first Belgian edition of X Factor started screening in late 2005 on vtm. The judges were Kris Wauters, Jean Blaute and Liliane Saint-Pierre; the show was hosted by Koen Wauters.

The winner of season one was Udo Mechels from Nossegem and the runner up was The Cappaert Sisters (Annelies & Sarah Cappaert) from Tongeren. Contestant Robin Danneels had to quit the show due to being hospitalized for his back pain. Therefore, Ivann could return to sing in the contest.

Name	Category	Date of birth	Originating from	Eliminated on/Position
Udo Mechels	25+	10 May 1976	Nossegem	Winner
Sarah and Annelies Cappaert (as The Cappaert Sisters)	Groups	24 July 1987 (Sarah); 10 September 1979 (Annelies)	Zedelgem	Finals
Ivann (Ivan Vermeer)	16-24	16 June 1981	Wilrijk	Semi-finals
Paco Garcia	16-24	23 March 1982	Heusden	9th live show
Patrick & Carina	Groups		Tongeren	8th live show
Helena Fontyn	25+	23 September 1974	Hemiksem	7th live show
Alexander Chiafele	16-24	8 April 1982	Turnhout	6th live show
Robin Daneels	25+	29 November 1978	Bruges	5th live show
Davy Lakomy	16-24	13 December 1987	As	4th live show
Three Cats	Groups			3rd live show
Véronique Flamand	25+	25 December 1972	Herentals	2nd live show
Rm'Ny	Groups			1st live show

Key:

– Winner
– Runner-up
– Third place
– Withdrew

Category (mentor)	Acts			
**Over 25s** (Kris Wauters)	Robin Daneels	Véronique Flamand	Helena Fontyn	Udo Mechels
**Groups** (Jean Blaute)	Patrick & Carina	Rm'Ny	The Cappaert Sisters	Three Cats
**Under 25s** (Liliane Saint-Pierre)	Alexander Chiafele	Paco Garcia	Ivann	Davy Lakomy

=== Results table ===
Contestants' colour key:

– Kris Wauter's contestants (over 25s)
– Liliane Saint-Pierre's contestants (16–24s)
– Jean Blaute's contestants (groups)
– Bottom two
– Safe

	Week 1	Week 2	Week 3	Week 4	Week 5	Week 6	Week 7	Week 8	Week 9	Week 10	Week 11
Udo Mechels	**3rd**	**5th**	**6th**	**1st**	**3rd**	**1st**	**2nd**	**1st**	**1st**	**1st**	**Winner** (Week 11)
The Cappaert Sisters	**1st**	**Safe**	**Safe**	**Safe**	**Safe**	**Safe**	**Safe**	**Bottom** **two**	**Safe**	**2nd**	**Runner-up** (Week 11)
Ivann	**Safe**	**Safe**	**Safe**	**Safe**	**Bottom** **two**	**Safe**	**Safe**	**Safe**	**Safe**	**3rd**	Eliminated (Week 10)
Paco Garcia	**Safe**	**Safe**	**Safe**	**Safe**	**Safe**	**Safe**	**Safe**	**Safe**	**4th**	Eliminated (Week 9)	
Patrick & Carina	**Safe**	**Safe**	**Bottom** **two**	**Safe**	**Bottom** **two**	**Bottom** **two**	**Bottom** **two**	**Bottom** **two**	Eliminated (Week 8)		
Helena Fontyn	**Bottom** **two**	**Safe**	**Safe**	**Bottom** **two**	**Safe**	**Safe**	**Bottom** **two**	Eliminated (Week 7)			
Alexander Chiafele	**Safe**	**Bottom** **two**	**Safe**	**Safe**	**Safe**	**Bottom** **two**	Eliminated (Week 6)				
Robin Daneels	**4th**	**1st**	**1st**	**3rd**	**1st**	Withdrew (Week 5)					
Davy Lakomy	**Safe**	**Safe**	**Safe**	**Bottom** **two**	Eliminated (Week 4)						
Three Cats	**Safe**	**Safe**	**Bottom** **two**	Eliminated (Week 3)							
Véronique Flamand	**Safe**	**Bottom** **two**	Eliminated (Week 2)								
Rm'Ny	**Bottom** **two**	Eliminated (Week 1)									
Withdrew	None				**Robin Daneels**	None					
Bottom two	Helena Fontyn, Rm'Ny	Alexander Chiafele, Véronique Flamand	Patrick & Carina, Three Cats	Davy Lakomy, Helena Fontyn	Ivann, Patrick & Carina	Alexander Chiafele, Patrick & Carina	Helena Fontyn, Patrick & Carina	Patrick & Carina, The Cappaert Sisters	-	-	-
Blaute's vote to eliminate	**Helena Fontyn**	**Véronique Flamand**	-	**Davy Lakomy**	**Ivann**	**Alexander Chiafele**	**Helena Fontyn**	-	-	-	-
Saint-Pierre's vote to eliminate	**Rm'Ny**	**Véronique Flamand**	**Three Cats**	-	**Patrick & Carina**	**Patrick & Carina**	**Helena Fontyn**	**Patrick & Carina**	-	-	-
Wauters' vote to eliminate	**Rm'Ny**	**Alexander Chiafele**	**Three Cats**	**Davy Lakomy**	**Ivann**	**Alexander Chiafele**	**Patrick & Carina**	**Patrick & Carina**	-	-	-
Eliminated	**Rm'Ny**; 2 of 3 votes	**Véronique Flamand**; 2 of 3 votes	**Three Cats**; 2 of 2 votes	**Davy Lakomy**; 2 of 2 votes	**Ivann**; 2 of 3 votes	**Alexander Chiafele**; 2 of 3 votes	**Helena Fontyn**; 2 of 3 votes	**Patrick & Carina**; 2 of 2 votes	**Paco Garcia**; Bottom	**Ivann**; Bottom	**The Cappaert Sisters**; Runner-up
Eliminated	**Rm'Ny**; 2 of 3 votes	**Véronique Flamand**; 2 of 3 votes	**Three Cats**; 2 of 2 votes	**Davy Lakomy**; 2 of 2 votes	**Ivann**; 2 of 3 votes	**Alexander Chiafele**; 2 of 3 votes	**Helena Fontyn**; 2 of 3 votes	**Patrick & Carina**; 2 of 2 votes	**Paco Garcia**; Bottom	**Ivann**; Bottom	**Udo Mechels**; Winner

== Season 2 (2008) ==
The second and final season aired in 2008. Dirk De Smet in the "Over 25" category and mentored by Kris Wauters won the title. Tom Dice who competed under his real name Tom Eeckhout was runner-up. The show was hosted by Hadise.

Key:

– Winner
– Runner-up
– Third place

Category (mentor)	Acts			
**Over 25s** (Kris Wauters)	Jurgen De Jaegher	Andy De Koker	Dirk De Smet	Elien Rossen
**Groups** (Do)	Lady-Like	Lester & Abdou	Mathieu & Guillaume Engels	Miss Behave
**Under 25s** (Maurice Engelen)	Rodwan Balkaïd	Tom Eeckhout	Karim Lequenne	Stefanie Schaekers

=== Results table ===
Contestants' colour key:

– Kris Wauter's contestants (over 25s)
– Maurice Engelen's contestants (16–24s)
– Do's contestants (groups)
– Bottom two
– Safe
– Eliminated (no bottom two)

	Week 1	Week 2	Week 3	Week 4	Week 5	Week 6	Week 7	Week 8	Week 9	Week 10	Week 11
Dirk De Smet	**2nd**	**2nd**	**3rd**	**3rd**	**2nd**	**4th**	**3rd**	**2nd**	**1st**	**1st**	**Winner** (Week 11)
Tom Eeckhout	**1st**	**1st**	**1st**	**1st**	**1st**	**1st**	**1st**	**1st**	**2nd**	**2nd**	**Runner-up** (Week 11)
Lester & Abdou	**12th**	**8th**	**6th**	**9th**	**5th**	**3rd**	**4th**	**5th**	**3rd**	**3rd**	Eliminated (Week 10)
Mathieu & Guillaume Engels	**3rd**	**3rd**	**2nd**	**2nd**	**3rd**	**5th**	**6th**	**3rd**	**4th**	Eliminated (Week 9)	
Karim Lequenne	**4th**	**5th**	**10th**	**5th**	**4th**	**2nd**	**2nd**	**4th**	Eliminated (Week 8)		
Elien Roosen	**6th**	**7th**	**4th**	**6th**	**7th**	**6th**	**5th**	Eliminated (Week 7)			
Lady-Like	**5th**	**4th**	**5th**	**4th**	**6th**	**7th**	Eliminated (Week 6)				
Jurgen De Jaegher	**7th**	**6th**	**7th**	**7th**	**8th**	Eliminated (Week 5)					
Stefanie Schaekers	**9th**	**10th**	**8th**	**8th**	Eliminated (Week 4)						
Rodwan Balkaïd	**8th**	**9th**	**9th**	Eliminated (Week 3)							
Miss Behave	**10th**	**11th**	Eliminated (Week 2)								
Andy De Koker	**11th**	Eliminated (Week 1)									
Bottom two	Andy De Kocker, Lester & Abdou	Miss Behave, Stefanie Schaekers	Karim Lequenne, Rodwan Balkaïd	Lester & Abdou, Stephanie Schaekers	Elien Roosen, Jurgen De Jaegher	Elien Roosen, Lady-Like	Elien Roosen, Mathieu & Guillaume Engels	Karim Lequenne, Lester & Abdou	-	-	-
Do's vote to eliminate	**Andy De Koker**	**Stefanie Schaekers**	**Karim Lequenne**	**Stefanie Schaekers**	**Elien Roosen**	**Elien Roosen**	**Elien Roosen**	**Karim Lequenne**	-	-	-
Engelen's vote to eliminate	**Andy De Koker**	**Miss Behave**	**Rodwan Balkaïd**	**Lester & Abou**	**Jurgen De Jaegher**	**Lady-Like**	**Elien Roosen**	**Lester & Abou**	-	-	-
Wauters' vote to eliminate	**Lester & Abdou**	**Miss Behave**	**Rodwan Balkaïd**	**Stefanie Schaekers**	**Jurgen De Jaegher**	**Lady-Like**	**Mathieu & Guillaume Engels**	**Karim Lequenne**	-	-	-
Eliminated	**Andy De Koker**; 2 of 3 votes	**Miss Behave**; 2 of 3 votes	**Rodwan Balkaïd**; 2 of 3 votes	**Stefanie Schaekers**; 2 of 3 votes	**Jurgen De Jaegher**; 2 of 3 votes	**Lady-Like**; 2 of 3 votes	**Elien Roosen**; 2 of 3 votes	**Karim Lequenne**; 2 of 3 votes	**Mathieu & Guillaume Engels**; Bottom	**Lester & Abdou**; Bottom	**Tom Eeckhout**; Runner-up
Eliminated	**Andy De Koker**; 2 of 3 votes	**Miss Behave**; 2 of 3 votes	**Rodwan Balkaïd**; 2 of 3 votes	**Stefanie Schaekers**; 2 of 3 votes	**Jurgen De Jaegher**; 2 of 3 votes	**Lady-Like**; 2 of 3 votes	**Elien Roosen**; 2 of 3 votes	**Karim Lequenne**; 2 of 3 votes	**Mathieu & Guillaume Engels**; Bottom	**Lester & Abdou**; Bottom	**Dirk De Smet**; Winner

=== Live show details ===
==== Week 1 (8 October 2008) ====
Contestants' performances on the first live show
Act	Order	Song	Result
Miss Behave	1	"Toxic"	Safe
Rodwan Balkaïd	2	"If Tomorrow Never Comes"	Safe
Tom Eeckhout	3	"Bleeding Love"	Safe
Andy De Koker	4	"You Don't Have to Say You Love Me"	Eliminated
Elien Roosen	5	"Love Song"	Safe
Jurgen De Jaegher	6	"Ik Ga Dood Aan Jou"	Safe
Lester & Abdou	7	"Valerie"	Bottom two
Dirk De Smet	8	"You Give Me Something"	Safe
Lady-Like	9	"Sisters Are Doin' It for Themselves"	Safe
Stefanie Schaekers	10	"Because of You"	Safe
Mathieu & Guillaume Engels	11	"Ik Heb Je Lief"	Safe
Karim Lequenne	12	"One"	Safe

Judges' votes to eliminate

- Wauters: Lester & Abdou
- Do: Andy De Koker
- Engelen: Andy De Koker

==== Week 2 (15 October 2008) ====
Contestants' performances on the second live show
Act	Order	Song	Result
Dirk De Smet	1	"Another Day"	Safe
Lady-Like	2	"Don't Let Go (Love)"	Safe
Karim Lequenne	3	"Sorry Seems to Be the Hardest Word"	Safe
Jurgen De Jaegher	4	"Ik Leef Voor Jou"	Safe
Stefanie Schaekers	5	"Unwritten"	Bottom two
Lester & Abdou	6	"Closer"	Safe
Tom Eeckhout	7	"Clocks"	Safe
Miss Behave	8	"Sway"	Eliminated
Elien Roosen	9	"All the Times I Cried"	Safe
Mathieu & Guillaume Engels	10	"Poolijs"	Safe
Rodwan Balkaïd	11	"Black and Gold"	Safe

Judges' votes to eliminate

- Do: Stefanie Schaekers
- Engelen: Miss Behave
- Wauters: Miss Behave

==== Week 3 (22 October 2008) ====
Contestants' performances on the third live show
Act	Order	Song	Result
Lester & Abdou	1	"What Goes Around... Comes Around"	Safe
Rodwan Balkaïd	2	"Everybody's Got to Learn Sometime"	Eliminated
Jurgen De Jaegher	3	"Zij"	Safe
Mathieu & Guillaume Engels	4	"Zuster"	Safe
Stefanie Schaekers	5	"Dance with My Father"	Safe
Elien Roosen	6	"You Keep Me Hangin' On"	Safe
Lady-Like	7	"Bridge over Troubled Water"	Safe
Karim Lequenne	8	"Sick and Tired"	Bottom two
Tom Eeckhout	9	"The Long and Winding Road"	Safe
Dirk De Smet	10	"Don't Look Back"	Safe

Judges' votes to eliminate

- Wauters: Rodwan Balkaïd
- Do: Karim Lequenne
- Engelen: Rodwan Balkaïd

==== Week 4 (29 October 2008) ====
Contestants' performances on the fourth live show
Act	Order	Song	Result
Tom Eeckhout	1	"I Don't Want to Be"	Safe
Lester & Abdou	2	"It Wasn't Me"	Bottom two
Dirk De Smet	3	"Still Crazy After All These Years"	Safe
Mathieu & Guillaume Engels	4	"J'te mentirais"	Safe
Karim Lequenne	5	"Somebody to Love"	Safe
Elien Roosen	6	"Warwick Avenue"	Safe
Lady-Like	7	"Black Horse and the Cherry Tree"	Safe
Jurgen De Jaegher	8	"Kom wat dichterbij"	Safe
Stefanie Schaekers	9	"I Kissed a Girl"	Eliminated

Judges' votes to eliminate

- Do: Stefanie Schaekers
- Engelen: Lester & Abdou
- Wauters: Stefanie Schaekers

==== Week 5 (5 November 2008) ====
Contestants' performances on the fifth live show
Act	Order	Song	Result
Jurgen De Jaegher	1	"Geen Toeval"	Eliminated
Lady-Like	2	"Mercy"	Safe
Karim Lequenne	3	"Ordinary People"	Safe
Elien Roosen	4	"That's Alright"	Bottom two
Lester & Abdou	5	"Lost Without U"	Safe
Tom Eeckhout	6	"Don't Stop the Music"	Safe
Dirk De Smet	7	"Is She Really Going Out with Him?"	Safe
Mathieu & Guillaume Engels	8	"Van God Los"	Safe

Judges' votes to eliminate

- Do: Elien Roosen
- Engelen: Jurgen De Jaegher
- Wauters: Jurgen De Jaegher

==== Week 6 (12 November 2008) ====
Contestants' performances on the sixth live show
Act	Order	Song	Result
Mathieu & Guillaume Engels	1	"Hallelujah"	Safe
Tom Eeckhout	2	"Wonderwall"	Safe
Lester & Abdou	3	"Pop"	Safe
Elien Roosen	4	"Wicked Game"	Bottom two
Karim Lequenne	5	"Purple Rain"	Safe
Dirk De Smet	6	"I Wonder Why"	Safe
Lady-Like	7	"Stop!"	Eliminated

Judges' votes to eliminate

- Wauters: Lady-Like
- Do: Elien Roosen
- Engelen: Lady-Like
