= Bad English (album) =

Studio album by Bad English
- Released: 26 June 1989
- Studios: One on One (North Hollywood, California); A&M, Conway, Secret Sound L.A. (Hollywood, California); Pacific Sound (Chatsworth, California); Can-Am Recorders (Tarzana, California)
- Genres: Hard rock; AOR
- Length: 62:10
- Label: Epic
- Producer: Richie Zito

Bad English chronology
Bad English (1989)	Backlash (1991)

Singles from Bad English
- 1. "Forget Me Not" Released: 1989; 2. "When I See You Smile" Released: 30 August 1989; 3. "Price of Love" Released: 1989; 4. "Don't Walk Away" Released: 1989 (UK); 5. "Heaven Is a 4 Letter Word" Released: 1990; 6. "Possession" Released: 1990

Bad English is the debut studio album by British/American rock band Bad English. It was released on 26 June 1989.

The album was a massive success, especially because of the No. 1 single "When I See You Smile". That single was certified gold by the RIAA while the album was certified platinum. Aside from that song, the album had two other top 40 hits, "Price of Love" and "Possession", which peaked at No. 5 and No. 21, respectively.

== Critical reception ==
Professional ratings
Review scores
Source	Rating
AllMusic	4/5 stars
LouderSound	4/5 stars
Rock Hard	8.5/10

The album received generally positive reviews.

RPM's reviewer David Spodek called it "an LP full of enough hard driving rock and roll and power chords to please any AOR MD" and named "Forget Me Not" as the best cut. Rock Hard gave an extremely positive review, and considered it the "best AOR album of the past six months". Pan-European magazine Music & Media found that the album full of "well-balanced, solid, melodic hard rock" and the "band seem to be at their best on the slower numbers where the quality of the hooks indicate that they could be the next big thing."

AllMusic's Dan Heilman gave the album four stars, saying, "Amid some tailor-made power ballads lurks some decent hard rock."

LouderSound writer Dave Everley gave the album four stars, explaining the rating with "Bad English marked the end of an era, but what a last hurrah it was". Nonetheless, in 2016, "When I See You Smile" was ranked by LouderSound as the 10th-worst power ballad ever written.

Musician reviewer J. D. Considine wrote simply: "Grammar is the least of their problems."

== In popular culture ==
"Best of What I Got" is featured during the credits to the 1989 film Tango & Cash.

== Track listing ==
Side one
No.	Title	Writer(s)	Length
1.	"Best of What I Got"	John Waite; Jonathan Cain; Neal Schon	4:40
2.	"Heaven Is a 4 Letter Word"	Schon; Cain; Waite; Mark Spiro	4:45
3.	"Possession"	Waite; Cain; Ricky Phillips	5:08
4.	"Forget Me Not"	Waite; Cain; Spiro	4:58
5.	"When I See You Smile"	Diane Warren	4:17
6.	"Tough Times Don't Last"	Cain; David Roberts; Waite	4:42

Side two
No.	Title	Writer(s)	Length
1.	"Ghost in Your Heart"	Waite; Martin Page; Cain	4:46
2.	"Price of Love"	Waite; Cain	4:47
3.	"Ready When You Are"	Cain; Waite; Schon; Todd Cerney	4:20
4.	"Lay Down"	Waite; Schon; Cain	4:38
5.	"The Restless Ones"	Waite; Cain; Phillips	5:23
6.	"Rockin' Horse"	Schon; Waite; Cain	5:31
7.	"Don't Walk Away"	Andy Hill; Peter Sinfield	4:30

== Personnel ==
Bad English

- John Waite – lead vocals
- Jonathan Cain – keyboards, rhythm guitar, backing vocals
- Neal Schon – lead guitar, acoustic guitar, backing vocals
- Ricky Phillips – bass, backing vocals
- Deen Castronovo – drums, percussion, backing vocals

Production

- Richie Zito – producer
- Phil Kaffel – engineer, mixing (1, 2, 7, 8, 10, 13)
- Mike Fraser – mixing (1–6, 8, 9, 11, 12)
- Daren Chadwick – second engineer
- Leon Johnson – second engineer
- Jeff Poe – second engineer
- Mike Tacci – second engineer
- Bob Vogt – second engineer
- Gary Wagner – second engineer
- Randy Wine – second engineer
- Toby Wright – second engineer
- George Marino – mastering at Sterling Sound (New York, NY)
- Richard Ivers – production coordinator
- Katy Parks – production coordinator
- Hugh Syme – art direction, design
- Chris Cuffaro – cover photography

== Charts ==
Chart (1989–1990)	Peak position
Australian Albums (ARIA)	12
Canada Top Albums/CDs (RPM)	34
Dutch Albums (Album Top 100)	95
Swedish Albums (Sverigetopplistan)	39
UK Albums (Official Charts)	74
US Billboard 200	21

== Certifications ==
Region	Certification	Certified units/sales
Canada (Music Canada)	Gold	50,000^{^}
United States (RIAA)	Platinum	1,000,000^{^}
^{^} Shipments figures based on certification alone.
