= Dirk De Smet =

- Born: April 30, 1969 (age 56); Kapellen, Belgium
- Occupations: Singer, musician
- Instrument: Saxophone

Dirk De Smet (born 30 April 1969 in Kapellen, Belgium) is a Flemish singer and saxophonist, best known for winning the second series of the Belgian edition of X Factor musical competition. He won the title on the final held on 17 December 2008 with 53% of the popular vote against the other finalist, Tom Eeckhout (later known as Tom Dice).

Dirk De Smet released the winning single on 18 December 2008 entitled "Walk and Don't Look Back", a remake of The Temptations' hit "Don't Look Back". De Smet's version reached No. 4, its highest position on the Belgian music charts on 27 December 2008.

== Discography ==
=== Singles ===
Year	Album	Peak positions	Certification
Year	Album	BEL (Vl)	Certification
2008	"Walk and Don't Look Back"	4	
