= Isn't It Time (The Babys song) =

1977 single by The Babys

"Isn't it Time"
- Side-A label of the British single

Single by The Babys

from the album Broken Heart
- B-side: "Give Me Your Love"
- Released: 20 September 1977
- Genre: Power pop; pop rock
- Length: 3:23 (single version); 4:03 (album version)
- Label: Chrysalis
- Songwriters: Jack Conrad, Ray Kennedy
- Producer: Ron Nevison

The Babys singles chronology
"If You've Got the Time" (1977)	"Isn't it Time" (1977)	"Silver Dreams" (1978)

"Isn't It Time" is a song that was performed by the English group The Babys in 1977 and was released on their album Broken Heart. It was a number-one hit in Australia in March 1978, and peaked at No. 13 on the US Billboard Hot 100 and No. 8 on the US Cash Box Top 100. It was the group's first of three US Top 40 hits.

== Background ==
"Isn't It Time" was written by bass guitarist Jack Conrad, who performed and recorded with The Doors after the death of Jim Morrison, along with Ray Kennedy, noted for co-writing The Beach Boys' "Sail On, Sailor" and performing and singing songs from the film "Phantom of the Paradise".

"Isn't It Time" is recognizable for its piano work performed by Michael Corby, its lead vocal performance by John Waite, and the vocal chorus is by the three Babettes from Andraé Crouch & The Disciples, Lisa Freeman-Roberts, Myrna Matthews and Pat Henderson. Their chorus frames the song, which moves through the decisions a lover has to make through its lyrics "I just can't find the answers to the questions that keep going through my mind" and "losing this love could be your mistake." The Babettes' refrain ("isn't it time you don't have to wait, falling in love could be your mistake") is heard alternating between the left and right channels later in the song, a technique by producer Ron Nevison.

In the United Kingdom, the single was released on 11 November 1977, and although the band was from England, the song only reached #45, despite its performance on the BBC's flagship music show Top of the Pops on 5 January 1978. It was The Babys' only UK charted single.

On 7 December 1977 a video of the Babys' "Isn't It Time" was aired on the ABC program American Bandstand.

== Chart performance ==
=== Weekly charts ===
Chart (1977–1978)	Peak position
Australia (Kent Music Report)	1
Belgium (Ultratop 50 Flanders)	8
Canada Top Singles (RPM)	8
Netherlands (Dutch Top 40)	4
Netherlands (Single Top 100)	7
UK Singles (Official Charts)	45
US Billboard Hot 100	13
US Adult Contemporary (Billboard)	49
US Cashbox Top 100	8
US Record World	11

=== Year-end charts ===
Chart (1977)	Position
Canada (RPM)	125

Chart (1978)	Position
Australia (Kent Music Report)	20
Belgium (Ultratop Flanders)	79
Canada (RPM)	154
Netherlands (Dutch Top 40)	84
Netherlands (Single Top 100)	60

== Certifications ==
Region	Certification	Certified units/sales
Australia (ARIA)	Gold	50,000^{^}
^{^} Shipments figures based on certification alone.

== Cover versions ==
- The song's co-writer Ray Kennedy recorded "Isn't It Time" for his 1980 self-titled album.
- English guitarist Robin Trower also recorded a cover of "Isn't It Time" for his 1990 album In the Line of Fire.
- Franco-Belgian singer Johnny Hallyday recorded a cover in 1978, Le cœur comme une montagne for the album Hollywood. (fr)
- Belgian singer Udo Mechels had a number one hit in 2006 with his cover.
