= Raymond Louis Kennedy =

American songwriter (1946-2014)

Raymond Louis Kennedy (November 26, 1946 – February 16, 2014) was an American singer, songwriter, musician, and record producer based in Los Angeles. His works span multiple genres including R&B, pop, rock, jazz, fusion, acid rock, country, and many more. He co-wrote "Sail On, Sailor", one of The Beach Boys' mid-career hits, as well as two hits for The Babys: "Every Time I Think of You" and "Isn't It Time".

== Biography ==
Born in Philadelphia, Kennedy began playing saxophone at age nine. He sang in a cappella groups in New Jersey and Philadelphia before becoming a dancing regular on American Bandstand in 1960. Dick Clark eventually offered to pay him to pantomime playing saxophone with artists including The Platters, The Drifters, Chubby Checker, Little Richard, and many others.

In 1965, Kennedy recorded his first single as vocalist with then-unknown Kenny Gamble, "Number 5 Gemini," on Guyden Records. In the same year, Kennedy also auditioned for and received a gig playing tenor sax with Gerry Mulligan, one of the top baritone jazz saxophonists in the world. That led to Kennedy leaving his home in New Jersey, playing various jazz clubs and making his way south. With drummer Jay David, Kennedy eventually left the tour to play various gigs with Dizzy Gillespie, J.J. Johnson, Buddy Rich and the Gene Krupa Jazz Group until he decided in 1962 that the lifestyle of a jazz musician was simply not for him.

Kennedy went to Paducah, Kentucky for a few performances with Brenda Lee; one-nighters with Little Richard, Fats Domino, Jerry Lee Lewis, Wilson Pickett, and many others followed. Encouraged by his friend Otis Redding, Kennedy shifted his focus back to singing and moved to New York City in 1963. He was signed by Ahmet Ertegun to Atlantic Records, recording as Jon and Ray and touring with Jon Mislan (aka Johnny Angel). In 1966, he formed another band named Group Therapy and recorded two albums, then moved to Los Angeles with them in 1968. Kennedy's first solo album, Raymond Louis Kennedy, was released in 1970. Also in 1970, he befriended Dave Mason of Traffic and toured with him in support of Mason's solo album Alone Together. The pair collaborated on the song "Seasons," which later was on the future Mason solo album Let It Flow. During that period, Kennedy also co-wrote the Beach Boys hit "Sail On, Sailor".

In 1974, Kennedy was featured on the soundtrack to the Brian DePalma cult film Phantom of the Paradise, singing "Life at Last" and a version of "The Phantom's Theme". In the movie, the former song was lip-synched by Gerrit Graham as the character Beef, who performed the song as a Frankenstein-type, flamboyant rocker, constructed by the members of The Undead during a Dr. Caligari-esque performance. In 1980, Kennedy released a second, self-titled solo album, Ray Kennedy; it featured the minor hit single "Just for the Moment", which would become Kennedy's only Billboard Hot 100 hit under his own name.

In addition to this solo album, Kennedy wrote, recorded, and toured for several decades with Sly and the Family Stone, Brian Wilson, Dave Mason, Jeff Beck, Barry Goldberg, Maurice White, Aerosmith, Michael Schenker, Engelbert Humperdinck, Wayne Newton, Tanya Tucker, Bill Champlin, Willie Nelson, Mick Fleetwood, and others.

== Albums ==
Year	Title	Artist/Band	Label
1963	Jon and Ray	Jon and Ray	Atlantic (unreleased)
1968	People Get Ready for Group Therapy	Group Therapy	RCA Victor
1969	37 Minutes of Group Therapy (aka You’re in Need of Group Therapy)	Group Therapy	Philips
1970	Raymond Louis Kennedy	Ray Kennedy	Cream Records
1976	KGB	KGB	MCA
1976	Motion	KGB	MCA
1980	Ray Kennedy	Ray Kennedy	ARC/Columbia

== Singles/contributed tracks ==
Year	Song title	Artist/Album
1965	"Number 5 Gemini"	Ray Kennedy single
1973	"Sail On, Sailor"	The Beach Boys - Holland
1973	"Why Should I Care?"	Beck, Bogert & Appice - Beck, Bogert & Appice
1974	"Life at Last"	Phantom of the Paradise soundtrack
1974	"The Phantom's Theme"	Phantom of the Paradise soundtrack
1977	"Seasons"	Dave Mason - Let It Flow
1978	"Isn't It Time"	The Babys - Broken Heart
1978	"Everytime I Think of You"	The Babys - Head First
1980	"Starlight"	Ray Kennedy
1980	"Just for the Moment"	Ray Kennedy
1981	"Tonight Tonight"	Bill Champlin - Runaway
1983	"Badman"	Uncommon Valor soundtrack
1983	"Brothers in the Night"	Uncommon Valor soundtrack
1995	"These Strange Times"	Fleetwood Mac - Time
2006	"Sail On, Sailor"	The Departed soundtrack
