= Ron Nevison =

American record producer

- Genres: Rock, pop
- Occupations: Record producer, audio engineer
- Years active: 1970–present
- Website: ronnevison.com

Ron Nevison is an American record producer and audio engineer. He started his career in the early 1970s as an engineer on Quadrophenia by the Who and Bad Company's debut album. He eventually became a producer, working with artists including Meat Loaf, The Babys, Led Zeppelin, Ozzy Osbourne, UFO, Michael Schenker Group, Survivor, Jefferson Starship, Thin Lizzy, Kiss, Europe, Chicago, Grand Funk Railroad, Heart, and Damn Yankees among many others.

== Career overview ==
Nevison's first work was as an engineer for the Who's Quadrophenia. From there, he did engineering work on the first three albums by Bad Company. He produced and engineered the Nightlife album by Thin Lizzy. In 1974, he engineered Led Zeppelin's Physical Graffiti.

Nevison also worked with Ozzy Osbourne on The Ultimate Sin, Shooting Star on Silent Scream, Kiss on Crazy Nights and both Damn Yankees albums.

Nevison has been recognized four times as Billboard's Top-5 Producer of the Year and has been nominated for several Grammy Awards.

== Partial discography as producer ==
- November 8, 1974 – Thin Lizzy, Nightlife
- April 1977 – Dave Mason, Let It Flow
- May 7, 1977 – UFO, Lights Out
- September 3, 1977 – The Babys, Broken Heart
- June 21, 1978 – UFO, Obsession
- 1978 – Mike Finnigan, Black & White
- January 2, 1979 – UFO, Strangers in the Night ("Everybody agrees that Strangers in the Night is one of the best live albums ever", Nevison remarked. "Whatever complaints Michael Schenker might have, he can stuff them".)
- January 9, 1979 – The Babys, Head First
- November 1, 1979 – Jefferson Starship, Freedom at Point Zero
- December 21, 1979 – Survivor, Survivor
- April 2, 1981 – Jefferson Starship, Modern Times
- September 1981 – Michael Schenker Group, MSG
- January 30, 1984 – Grace Slick, Software
- May 30, 1984 – Jefferson Starship, Nuclear Furniture
- August 1984 – Survivor, Vital Signs
- April 15, 1985 – Shooting Star, Silent Scream
- July 6, 1985 – Heart, Heart
- February 22, 1986 – Ozzy Osbourne, The Ultimate Sin
- October 9, 1986 – Survivor, When Seconds Count
- June 6, 1987 – Heart, Bad Animals
- September 18, 1987 – Kiss, Crazy Nights
- June 21, 1988 – Chicago, Chicago 19
- August 9, 1988 – Europe, Out of This World
- August 22, 1989 – Jefferson Airplane, Jefferson Airplane
- February 22, 1990 – Damn Yankees, Damn Yankees
- January 29, 1991 – Chicago, Twenty 1
- October 1, 1992 – Damn Yankees, Don't Tread
- April 27, 1993 – Vince Neil, Exposed
- April 11, 1995 – FireHouse, 3
- April 14, 1995 (Japan) – UFO, Walk on Water
- November 14, 1995 – Meat Loaf, Welcome to the Neighborhood
- August 28, 1996 – Michael Schenker Group, Written in the Sand
- May 10, 1997 – Michael Schenker Group, The Michael Schenker Story Live
- July 21, 1998 - Candlebox, Happy Pills
- August 10, 1999 – Lynyrd Skynyrd, Edge of Forever
- October 11, 2000 - Dimonet, Attention Control Room
- 2006 – Days Before Tomorrow, The Sky Is Falling
- 2011 – Walden Waltz, Walden Waltz EP

== See also ==
- Ronnie Lane's Mobile Studio
