= Kenny Loggins discography =

Cataloging of published recordings by Kenny Loggins

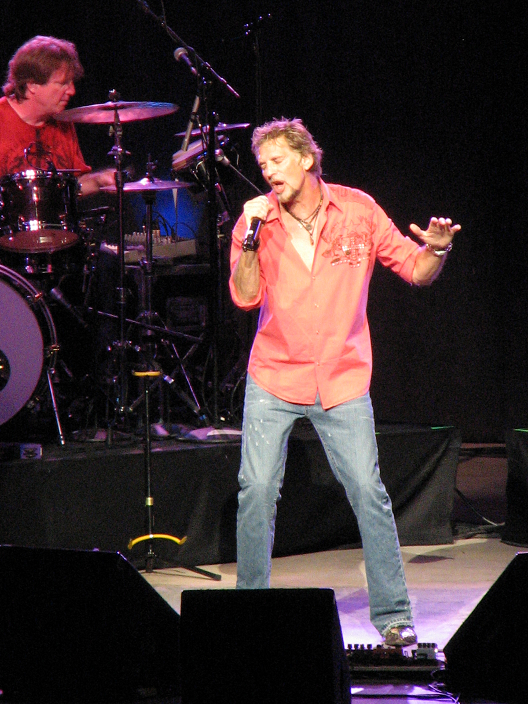
- Loggins performing at Interlochen Fine Arts Camp on August 5, 2009
- Studio albums: 14
- Live albums: 2
- Compilation albums: 2
- Singles: 31

This is the discography of Kenny Loggins. His two biggest hit singles were both from movie soundtracks: "Footloose," from the 1984 movie of the same name, hit number one on the Billboard Hot 100. "Danger Zone," from the 1986 movie Top Gun, hit number two. In all, five of Loggins' singles reached the top ten. According to the Recording Industry Association of America, five of his albums achieved platinum status and five were gold.

For Loggins' earlier work with Jim Messina, see the Loggins and Messina discography.

== Studio albums ==
Year	Album details	Peak positions				Certifications (sales threshold)
Year	Album details	US	US Indie	AUS	SWE	Certifications (sales threshold)
1977	Celebrate Me Home: Release date: April 13, 1977; Label: Columbia	27	—	—	—	RIAA: Platinum
1978	Nightwatch: Release date: July 12, 1978; Label: Columbia	7	—	70	—	RIAA: Platinum
1979	Keep the Fire: Release date: September 28, 1979; Label: Columbia	16	—	95	—	RIAA: Platinum
1982	High Adventure: Release date: August 20, 1982; Label: Columbia	13	—	—	46	RIAA: Platinum
1985	Vox Humana: Release date: March 22, 1985; Label: Columbia	41	—	—	33	RIAA: Gold
1988	Back to Avalon: Release date: August 4, 1988; Label: Columbia	69	—	—	24	
1991	Leap of Faith: Release date: September 10, 1991; Label: Columbia	71	—	—	—	RIAA: Gold
1994	Return to Pooh Corner^{[A]}: Release date: May 10, 1994; Label: Columbia/Sony Wonder	65	—	—	—	RIAA: Platinum
1997	The Unimaginable Life: Release date: July 8, 1997; Label: Columbia	107	—	—	—	
1998	December: Release date: October 13, 1998; Label: Columbia	148	—	—	—	
2000	More Songs from Pooh Corner: Release date: February 8, 2000; Label: Columbia	—	—	—	—	
2003	It's About Time: Release date: August 19, 2003; Label: All the Best	—	10	—	—	
2007	How About Now: Release date: February 20, 2007; Label: Concord	—	—	—	—	
2009	All Join In: Release date: July 21, 2009; Label: Walt Disney	—	—	—	—	
"—" denotes releases that did not chart

== Live albums ==
Year	Album details	Peak positions		Certifications (sales threshold)
Year	Album details	US	AUS	Certifications (sales threshold)
1980	Kenny Loggins Alive: Release date: September 1980; Label: Columbia	11	72	RIAA: Gold
1993	Outside: From the Redwoods: Release date: August 10, 1993; Label: Columbia	60	—	RIAA: Gold

== Compilation albums ==
Year	Album details	Peak positions	Certifications (sales threshold)
Year	Album details	US	Certifications (sales threshold)
1993	Love Songs of Kenny Loggins: Release date: 1993; Label: Columbia	—	
1997	Yesterday, Today, Tomorrow: Release date: March 25, 1997; Label: Columbia	39	RIAA: Platinum
2002	The Essential Kenny Loggins: Release date: November 19, 2002; Label: Columbia/Legacy	181	
2020	Japanese Singles Collection-Greatest Hits: Release date: October 21, 2020; Label: Sony Music Entertainment Japan	—	
"—" denotes releases that did not chart

== Singles ==
Year	Single	Peak chart positions										Certifications	Album
Year	Single	US	US AC	US Main	US R&B	CAN	UK	NZ	NL	SWI	AUS	Certifications	Album
1977	"I Believe in Love"	66	37	—	—	45	—	—	—	—	—		Celebrate Me Home
1978	"Whenever I Call You 'Friend'" (with Stevie Nicks)	5	9	—	—	3	—	40	15	—	26		Nightwatch
1979	"Easy Driver"	60	—	—	—	55	—	—	—	—	—		Nightwatch
1979	"This Is It"	11	17	—	19	9	—	35	26	—	85		Keep the Fire
1980	"Keep the Fire"	36	40	—	—	52	—	—	—	—	—		Keep the Fire
1980	"I'm Alright"	7	—	—	—	5	—	50	44	—	53		Caddyshack: Music from the Motion Picture Soundtrack
1982	"Don't Fight It" (with Steve Perry)	17	—	4	—	7	—	—	—	—	—		High Adventure
1983	"Heart to Heart"	15	3	—	71	39	—	—	—	—	—		High Adventure
1983	"Welcome to Heartlight"	24	17	—	—	37	—	—	35	—	—		High Adventure
1984	"Footloose"	1	—	2	—	1	6	1	—	4	1	BPI: 3× Platinum; RMNZ: 5× Platinum; RIAA: Platinum	Footloose: Original Soundtrack Of The Paramount Motion Picture
1984	"I'm Free (Heaven Helps the Man)"	22	—	42	—	28	—	—	—	—	—		Footloose: Original Soundtrack Of The Paramount Motion Picture
1985	"Vox Humana"	29	—	18	—	36	—	—	—	—	—		Vox Humana
1985	"Forever"	40	5	—	—	—	—	—	—	—	94		Vox Humana
1985	"I'll Be There"	88	33	—	—	—	—	—	—	—	—		Vox Humana
1986	"Danger Zone"	2	—	7	—	7	45	12	—	6	14	ARIA: 4× Platinum; BPI: Platinum; RMNZ: 2× Platinum	Top Gun: Original Motion Picture Soundtrack
1986	"Playing with the Boys"	60	—	—	—	—	—	—	—	—	—		Top Gun: Original Motion Picture Soundtrack
1987	"Meet Me Half Way"	11	2	—	—	28	—	—	—	—	—		Over the Top: Original Motion Picture Soundtrack
1988	"Nobody's Fool"	8	42	30	—	11	—	—	—	—	—		Caddyshack II: Original Motion Picture Soundtrack of the Warner Bros. Film
1988	"I'm Gonna Miss You"	82	—	—	—	—	—	—	—	—	—		Back to Avalon
1989	"Tell Her"	76	—	—	—	—	—	—	—	—	—		Back to Avalon
1991	"Conviction of the Heart"	65	9	—	—	33	—	—	—	—	—		Leap of Faith
1992	"The Real Thing"	—	5	—	—	39	—	—	—	—	—		Leap of Faith
1992	"If You Believe"	—	9	—	—	58	—	—	—	—	—		Leap of Faith
1992	"Now or Never"	—	34	—	—	—	—	—	—	—	—		Leap of Faith
1993	"This Is It" (live)	—	31	—	—	—	—	—	—	—	—		Outside: From the Redwoods
1994	"Return to Pooh Corner"	—	25	—	—	75	—	—	—	—	—		Return to Pooh Corner
1996	"For the First Time"	—	1	—	—	—	—	—	—	—	81		One Fine Day: Music from the Motion Picture
1997	"I Am Not Hiding"	—	21	—	—	—	—	—	—	—	—		The Unimaginable Life
2003	"With This Ring"	—	22	—	—	—	—	—	—	—	—		It's About Time
2004	"I Miss Us"	—	18	—	—	—	—	—	—	—	—		It's About Time
2009	"There Is a Mountain"	—	—	—	—	—	—	—	—	—	—		All Join In
2009	"Two of Us"	—	—	—	—	—	—	—	—	—	—		All Join In
"—" denotes releases that did not chart

== Video albums ==
Year	Video details	Details
1981	Alive!: Studio: Sony BMG; Format: VHS, LD, DVD	A full-length live concert at the Santa Barbara Bowl in Santa Barbara, California.
1992	Live from the Grand Canyon: Studio: Sony BMG; Format: VHS, LD, DVD	
1993	Outside from the Red Woods: Studio: Sony BMG; Format: VHS, LD, DVD	
1996	Return to Pooh Corner: Studio: Sony BMG; Format: VHS	
2018	Kenny Loggins and Friends: Live On Soundstage: Studio: Sony BMG; Format: Blu-Ray	

== Music videos ==
Year	Song	Director(s)
1978	"Whenever I Call You Friend"	
1979	"This Is It"	
1980	"Keep the Fire"	
1982	"Heart to Heart"	Steve Barron
1982	"Swear Your Love"	Steve Barron
1982	"Welcome to Heartlight"	Steve Barron
1984	"Footloose"	Brian Grant
1984	"I'm Free (Heaven Helps the Man)"	Brian Grant
1985	"Vox Humana"	D.J. Webster
1985	"Forever"	Jim Yukich
1986	"Playing with the Boys"	
1986	"Danger Zone"	Tony Scott
1987	"Meet Me Half Way"	Russell Mulcahy
1988	"Nobody's Fool"	Jim Yukich
1988	"I'm Gonna Miss You"	
1991	"Conviction of the Heart"	
1997	"For the First Time"	Dani Jacobs
2000	"Your Heart Will Lead You Home"	
2009	"There Is a Mountain"	Nigel Dick
2009	"Underneath the Same Sky"	Nigel Dick

== Other appearances ==
Year	Song	Album
1994	"Footloose" (live version)	Grammy's Greatest Moments Volume III
1998	"One Small Voice"	Elmopalooza!
1999	"Harmony" (with Clint Black)	D'lectrified

== Notes ==
- A Return to Pooh Corner also reached No. 7 on the U.S. Billboard Top Kids Audio chart.
