= The Essential Kenny Loggins =

Compilation album by Kenny Loggins
- Released: November 19, 2002
- Genre: Rock
- Length: 151:21
- Label: Columbia; Legacy
- Producer: Kenny Loggins; Jim Messina; Bob James; Phil Ramone; Tom Dowd; Bruce Botnick; Michael Omartian; Giorgio Moroder; Terry Nelson; David Pack; Randy Jackson; Peter Asher

Kenny Loggins albums chronology
More Songs from Pooh Corner (2000)	The Essential Kenny Loggins (2002)	It's About Time (2003)

The Essential Kenny Loggins Limited Edition 3.0
- Limited Edition 3.0 cover

Professional ratings
Review scores
Source	Rating
AllMusic	4.5/5 stars

The Essential Kenny Loggins is the third compilation and second greatest hits album by American singer-songwriter Kenny Loggins, released on November 19, 2002. It is part of Sony BMG's Essential series of compilation albums and includes tracks from Loggins' solo output, as well as tracks from his Loggins and Messina days. A limited edition was released with seven additional tracks.

== Track listing ==
=== Disc one ===
No.	Title	Writer(s)	Originally from	Length
1.	"Your Mama Don't Dance"	Kenny Loggins, Jim Messina	Loggins and Messina, 1972	2:50
2.	"Vahevala"	Dan Loggins, Dann Lottermoser	Sittin' In, 1971	4:47
3.	"Danny's Song"	Kenny Loggins	Sittin' In	4:17
4.	"House at Pooh Corner"	Kenny Loggins	Sittin' In	4:21
5.	"A Love Song"	Kenny Loggins, Dona Lyn George	Full Sail, 1973	3:13
6.	"Watching the River Run"	Kenny Loggins, Jim Messina	Full Sail	3:28
7.	"Angry Eyes (single version)"	Kenny Loggins, Jim Messina	Loggins and Messina	2:27
8.	"Celebrate Me Home"	Kenny Loggins, Bob James	Celebrate Me Home, 1977	4:47
9.	"I Believe in Love"	Kenny Loggins, Alan Bergman, Marilyn Bergman	Celebrate Me Home	3:32
10.	"Wait a Little While"	Kenny Loggins, Eva Ein	Nightwatch, 1978	3:58
11.	"Whenever I Call You 'Friend'" (featuring Stevie Nicks)	Kenny Loggins, Melissa Manchester	Nightwatch	4:01
12.	"This Is It"	Kenny Loggins, Michael McDonald	Keep the Fire, 1979	3:58
13.	"Keep the Fire"	Kenny Loggins, Eva Ein	Keep the Fire	4:36
14.	"Now And Then"	Kenny Loggins, Jeff Bouchard	Keep the Fire	3:56
15.	"I'm Alright"	Kenny Loggins	Caddyshack (soundtrack), 1980	3:48
16.	"Heartlight"	Kenny Loggins	High Adventure, 1982	3:57
17.	"Heart to Heart"	Kenny Loggins, Michael McDonald	High Adventure	5:20
18.	"I'm Free (Heaven Helps the Man)"	Kenny Loggins, Dean Pitchford	Footloose (soundtrack), 1984	3:47
19.	"Don't Fight It" (featuring Steve Perry)	Kenny Loggins, Dean Pitchford, Steve Perry	High Adventure	3:37
Total length:				74:50

=== Disc two ===
No.	Title	Writer(s)	Originally from	Length
1.	"Footloose"	Kenny Loggins, Dean Pitchford	Footloose (soundtrack)	3:48
2.	"No Lookin' Back"	Kenny Loggins, Michael McDonald, Ed Sanford	Vox Humana, 1985	4:52
3.	"Forever"	Kenny Loggins, David Foster, Eva Ein	Vox Humana	4:26
4.	"Danger Zone"	Giorgio Moroder, Tom Whitlock	Top Gun (soundtrack), 1986	3:37
5.	"Vox Humana"	Kenny Loggins, Anita Pointer, June Pointer	Vox Humana	4:14
6.	"Meet Me Half Way"	Giorgio Moroder, Tom Whitlock	Over the Top (soundtrack), 1987 / Back to Avalon, 1988	3:41
7.	"Nobody's Fool"	Kenny Loggins, Michael Towers	Caddyshack II (soundtrack) / Back to Avalon	4:19
8.	"All the Pretty Little Ponies" (featuring David Crosby and Graham Nash)	Kenny Loggins, David Pack	Return to Pooh Corner, 1994	4:01
9.	"Leap of Faith"	Kenny Loggins, Guy Thomas	Leap of Faith, 1991	7:35
10.	"The Real Thing"	Kenny Loggins, David Foster	Leap of Faith	5:39
11.	"For the First Time"	James Newton Howard, Jud J. Friedman, Allan Dennis	One Fine Day (soundtrack), 1996	4:28
12.	"Conviction of the Heart"	Kenny Loggins, Guy Thomas	Leap of Faith	6:53
13.	"Your Heart Will Lead You Home"	Kenny Loggins, Richard M. Sherman, Robert B. Sherman	The Tigger Movie (soundtrack) / More Songs from Pooh Corner, 2000	5:00
14.	"Return To Pooh Corner"	Kenny Loggins, Jeff Bouchard	Return to Pooh Corner	4:17
15.	"The Unimaginable Life"	Kenny Loggins, David Foster	The Unimaginable Life, 1997	6:05
16.	"What a Fool Believes (live)" (with Michael McDonald)	Kenny Loggins, Michael McDonald	Outside: From the Redwoods, 1993	4:19
Total length:				77:20

Disc three (Limited edition 3.0)

1. "Till the Ends Meet" - 3:09
2. "The More We Try" - 4:00
3. "Easy Driver" - 3:34
4. "Love Will Follow" - 7:13
5. "Sweet Reunion" - 5:47
6. "Always, In All Ways" - 4:09
7. "Junkanoo Holiday (Fallin'-Flyin')" - 5:03

== Personnel ==
- Kenny Loggins – vocals, rhythm guitar, harmonica, acoustic guitar
- Jim Messina – vocals, lead guitar, electric mandolin, acoustic guitar (tracks 1–7)
- Stevie Nicks – lead and backing vocals on "Whenever I Call You Friend"
- Mike Hamilton – guitar, backing vocals
- George Hawkins – bass, backing vocals
- Brian Mann – keyboards
- Tris Imboden – drums, harmonica
- Jon Clarke – horns, woodwinds
- Vince Denham – horns
- Bob James – string arrangements
- Dann Huff – guitar on "Danger Zone"
- Giorgio Moroder – keyboards on "Danger Zone"
- Tom Whitlock – synthesizer on "Danger Zone"
- John Robinson – drum fills on "Danger Zone"
- Tom Scott – saxophone on "Danger Zone"
- Steve Perry – co-lead vocals on "Don't Fight It"
- Neil Giraldo – lead guitar on "Don't Fight It"
- Mike Hamilton – bass on "Don't Fight It"
- Dennis Conway – drums on "Don't Fight It"
- Tris Imboden – percussion on "Don't Fight It"

Loggins & Messina band

- Merel Bregante – backing vocals, drums (tracks 1–7)
- Lester "Al" Garth – violin, recorder, alto and tenor saxophones (tracks 1–7)
- Jon Clarke – flute, oboe, recorder, baritone saxophone, soprano saxophone, tenor saxophone (tracks 1–7)
- Larry Sims – backing vocals, bass (tracks 1–7)

== Charts ==
Chart performance for The Essential Kenny Loggins
Chart (2022)	Peak position
US Billboard 200	186

== Release history ==
Release history and formats for The Essential Kenny Loggins
Country	Date	Label	Format	Catalog
United States	November 19, 2002	Columbia, Legacy	CD	1058077856/201420897
Australia	August 13, 2004	Columbia, Legacy	CD	109735
