= Yesterday, Today, Tomorrow (album) =

Compilation album by Kenny Loggins
- Released: March 25, 1997
- Genre: Soft rock
- Length: 67:12
- Label: Columbia
- Producer: Various

Kenny Loggins chronology
Return to Pooh Corner (1994)	Yesterday, Today, Tomorrow (1997)	The Unimaginable Life (1997)

Professional ratings
Review scores
Source	Rating
Allmusic	4.5/5 stars

Yesterday, Today, Tomorrow is the second compilation and first greatest hits album by American singer-songwriter Kenny Loggins. Released in 1997, it contains many of the hit singles from Loggins' solo career, including many of his movie soundtrack contributions, as well as "The Rest of Your Life," a preview of his subsequent album The Unimaginable Life.

In May 2000 the album was certified Platinum by the RIAA.

== Track listing ==
No.	Title	Writer(s)	Original album	Length
1.	"This Is It"	Kenny Loggins; Michael McDonald	Keep the Fire (1979)	3:56
2.	"Whenever I Call You 'Friend'" (with Stevie Nicks)	Kenny Loggins; Melissa Manchester	Nightwatch (1978)	4:01
3.	"Footloose"	Kenny Loggins; Dean Pitchford	Footloose (1984)	3:41
4.	"Heart to Heart"	Kenny Loggins; Michael McDonald; David Foster	High Adventure (1982)	5:20
5.	"Danger Zone"	Giorgio Moroder; Tom Whitlock	Top Gun (1986)	3:35
6.	"Meet Me Half Way"	Giorgio Moroder; Tom Whitlock	Back to Avalon (1988)	3:39
7.	"I'm Alright (Theme From "Caddyshack")"	Kenny Loggins	Caddyshack (1980)	3:46
8.	"Return to Pooh Corner"	Kenny Loggins	Return to Pooh Corner (1994)	4:14
9.	"Don't Fight It" (with Steve Perry)	Kenny Loggins; Stephen Perry; Dean Pitchford	High Adventure	3:37
10.	"Forever"	Kenny Loggins; David Foster; Eva Ein Loggins	Vox Humana (1985)	4:23
11.	"Conviction of the Heart"	Kenny Loggins; Guy Thomas; Mark Isham	Leap of Faith (1991)	6:51
12.	"The Real Thing"	Kenny Loggins; David Foster	Leap of Faith	5:38
13.	"For the First Time"	James Newton Howard; Jud Friedman; Allan Dennis Rich	One Fine Day: Music From The Motion Picture (1996)	4:26
14.	"Celebrate Me Home"	Kenny Loggins; Bob James	Celebrate Me Home (1977)	4:44
15.	"The Rest of Your Life"	Kenny Loggins; Jonathan Butler; Julia Loggins	The Unimaginable Life (1997)	5:21
Total length:				67:12

South Korea bonus track
No.	Title	Writer(s)	Original album	Length
16.	"The More We Try"	Kenny Loggins; Eva Ein Loggins	High Adventure	4:02
Total length:				71:14

== Charts ==
=== Weekly charts ===
Chart (1997)	Peak position
US Billboard 200	39
US Top Catalog Albums (Billboard)	12

=== Year-end charts ===
Chart (1997)	Position
US Billboard 200	163
