= Kenny Loggins Alive =

1980 live album by Kenny Loggins

Live album by Kenny Loggins
- Released: September 18, 1980
- Recorded: 12 and 14 December 1978; 13–15 March, 12 June, and 20 July 1980
- Venues: Senator Theatre, Chico, CA; Community Center Theatre, Sacramento, CA; High Sierra Theatre, Tahoe, NV; Universal Amphitheatre, Los Angeles, CA; Fox Theatre, Atlanta, GA
- Genres: Pop rock; soft rock
- Length: 92:13
- Label: Columbia
- Producers: Bruce Botnick; Kenny Loggins

Kenny Loggins chronology
Caddyshack: Music from the Motion Picture Soundtrack (1980)	Kenny Loggins Alive (1980)	High Adventure (1982)

Professional ratings
Review scores
Source	Rating
Allmusic	3/5 stars

Kenny Loggins Alive is the first live album by American singer-songwriter Kenny Loggins. Released on September 18, 1980, it contains material from Loggins' three previous solo albums, as well as a previously unreleased song "All Alone Tonight", "I'm Alright" (the theme from Caddyshack) and a cover of The Beatles "Here There and Everywhere" (Loggins is known to be a Beatles fan). A concert video of the same title was also released and is available with different songs.

== Audio track listing ==
All tracks are written by Kenny Loggins, except where noted.

Side one
No.	Title	Writer(s)	Recording date & location	Length
1.	"I Believe in Love"	Loggins, Alan Bergman, Marilyn Bergman	12 June 1980 at the Universal Amphitheatre, Los Angeles, CA	4:09
2.	"Whenever I Call You "Friend""	Loggins, Melissa Manchester	14 December 1978 at the Community Center Theatre, Sacramento, CA	5:08
3.	"Wait a Little While"	Loggins, Eva Ein	14 December 1978 at the Community Center Theatre, Sacramento, CA	4:18
4.	"Why Do People Lie"	Loggins, Ein	12 December 1978 at the Senator Theatre, Chico, CA	6:47

Side two
No.	Title	Writer(s)	Recording date & location	Length
5.	"What a Fool Believes"	Loggins, Michael McDonald	12 June 1980 at the Universal Amphitheatre, Los Angeles, CA	3:53
6.	"Junkanoo Holiday (Fallin'-Flyin')"	Loggins, McDonald, David Foster	12 June 1980 at the Universal Amphitheatre, Los Angeles, CA	5:03
7.	"I'm Alright"		20 July 1980 at the Fox Theatre, Atlanta, GA	5:09
8.	"Celebrate Me Home"	Loggins, Bob James	14 December 1978 at the Community Center Theatre, Sacramento, CA	9:50

Side three
No.	Title	Writer(s)	Recording date & location	Length
9.	"You Don't Know Me"	Cindy Walker, Eddy Arnold	14 December 1978 at the Community Center Theatre, Sacramento, CA	5:03
10.	"Now and Then"	Loggins, Jeff Bouchard	13–15 March 1980 at High Sierra Theatre, Tahoe, NV	4:29
11.	"All Alone Tonight"	Loggins, Dona Lyn George, Alan Thornhill, Martin Young	20 July 1980 at the Fox Theatre, Atlanta, GA	3:05
12.	"Here, There and Everywhere"	John Lennon, Paul McCartney	13–15 March 1980 at High Sierra Theatre, Tahoe, NV	3:02
13.	"Angelique"	Loggins, Ein	14 December 1978 at the Community Center Theatre, Sacramento, CA	7:59

Side four
No.	Title	Writer(s)	Recording date & location	Length
14.	"Love Has Come of Age"		12 June 1980 at the Universal Amphitheatre, Los Angeles, CA	4:03
15.	"This Is It"	Loggins, McDonald	12 June 1980 at the Universal Amphitheatre, Los Angeles, CA	4:14
16.	"Down 'N' Dirty"	Loggins, Ein, Brian Mann	12 December 1978 at the Senator Theatre, Chico, CA	6:20
17.	"Easy Driver"	Jerry Riopelle, David Plenn	14 December 1978 at the Community Center Theatre, Sacramento, CA	3:55
18.	"Keep the Fire"	Loggins, Ein	12 June 1980 at the Universal Amphitheatre, Los Angeles, CA	5:46
Total length:				92:13

== Charts ==
Chart (1980)	Peak position
Australia (Kent Music Report)	72
Canada Top Albums/CDs (RPM)	97
US Billboard 200	11

== Personnel ==
=== Musicians ===
- Kenny Loggins – lead vocals, guitars
- Mike Hamilton – guitars, backing vocals
- George Hawkins – bass, backing vocals
- Brian Mann – keyboards, synthesizers, organ, backing vocals
- Tris Imboden – drums, backing vocals
- Vince Denham – horns, woodwinds, bass clarinet, percussion, backing vocals
- Jon Clarke – horns, woodwinds, double-reeds, percussion, backing vocals

==== Guest musicians ====
- Mark Wittenberg – guitar (7)
- Albhy Galuten – string arrangements (12)
- Steve Wood – vocals (18)

=== Technical ===
- Produced by Bruce Botnick and Kenny Loggins
- Recorded by Bruce Botnick
- Engineered by Mark Ettel, Jay Kaufman, Rik Pekkonen
- Photography – Don Hamilton
- Back cover – Hiro Ito
- Visual coordinator – Nancy Donald
- Management – Larry Larson & Associates

== Video track listing ==
Alive!

Video by Kenny Loggins
- Released: 1981
- Recorded: August 23–24, 1980
- Venues: Santa Barbara Bowl, Santa Barbara, CA
- Genre: Soft rock
- Length: 59:04
- Label: Pioneer Artists
- Producers: Ken Ehrlich; Don Mischer

All tracks are written by Kenny Loggins, with additional writers noted.

Disc one
No.	Title	Writer(s)	Length
1.	"All Alone Tonight"	Dona Lyn George, Alan Thornhill, Martin Young	1:51
2.	"I Believe in Love"	Alan Bergman, Marilyn Bergman	3:54
3.	"Love Has Come of Age"		3:47
4.	"Lady Luck"	John Townsend	1:42
5.	"Angry Eyes"	Jim Messina	7:38
6.	"I'm Alright"		4:54
7.	"House at Pooh Corner"		1:54
8.	"Danny's Song"		3:17
9.	"Junkanoo Holiday"		4:26
10.	"Celebrate Me Home"	Bob James	10:17
11.	"Mr. Night"	Richard Stekol	3:29
12.	"This Is It"	Michael McDonald	4:04
13.	"Keep the Fire"		6:18
Total length:			59:04

== Personnel ==
- Kenny Loggins – lead vocals, guitars
- Brian Mann – keyboards, synthesizers, organ, backing vocals
- Mike Hamilton – guitars, backing vocals
- George Hawkins – bass, backing vocals
- Tris Imboden – drums, backing vocals
- Jon Clarke – horns, woodwinds, double-reeds, percussion, backing vocals
- Vince Denham – horns, woodwinds, bass clarinet, percussion, backing vocals

=== Technical ===
- Executive producer – Larry Larson
- Produced by Ken Ehrlich and Don Mischer
- Associate producer – Nancy Henson
- Associate director – Jan Cornel
- Art director – Rene Lagler
- Lighting director – Greg Brunton
- Music producer – Bruce Botnick
- Photography – Bruce Ditchfield
