= Honk (band) =

American rock band

- Origin: Laguna Beach, California, U.S.
- Genres: Folk rock, rock
- Years active: 1970–1975, 1983–present
- Labels: Granite, 20th Century, Epic
- Members: Will Brady; Craig Buhler; Tris Imboden; Richard Stekol; Beth Fitchet Wood; Steve Wood
- Past members: Mike Caruselle; Don Whaley
- Website: honkband.com

Honk is an American rock band based in Laguna Beach, California. It is best known for providing the soundtrack for the 1972 surf documentary film Five Summer Stories.

== Career ==
The band was formalized in 1970, recorded some demo songs, and then recorded their first album for a $1500 fee. It was the soundtrack for the "cinematic cult classic" surf film, Five Summer Stories. In the early 1970s they toured with The Beach Boys, Chicago, Jackson Browne and Dave Mason before splitting up in 1975. The band reformed in 1985 and continue to occasionally perform.

"Honk had a reputation for being a musician's kind of band," Stekol said. "It was a lot of fun. Honk's problem was with the business, not the players. No one had any difficulty with anyone else in the band. But no one had the ego to stay with it when things weren't working."

— Richard Stekol, of Honk

== Members ==
- Will Brady (bass and vocals)
- Craig Buhler (saxophone, clarinet, and flute)
- Tris Imboden (drums)
- Richard Stekol (vocals and guitar)
- Beth Fitchet Wood (vocals and guitar)
- Steve Wood (keyboards and vocals)

Honk's drummer, Tris Imboden, has also been a member of several other notable groups. This includes the Kenny Loggins Band, which was featured in the Number One soundtracks for prominent 1980s films, Caddyshack and Footloose. He was also the drummer for the multi-platinum Chicago from 1990 until 2018.

As drummer for the Kenny Loggins Band, Tris Imboden would collaborate with Richard Stekol. Loggins and Stekol co-wrote "Mr. Night", which was published in the album Keep the Fire and later in the soundtrack for Caddyshack.

Steve Wood is an award winner for his work on the soundtracks for the IMAX movies Everest and The Living Sea.

== Discography ==
Year	Album	Publisher	Track List	Source
1972	The Original Soundtrack From; Five Summer Stories	Granite Records	No. / Title / Length; 1. / "Creation"; 2. / "Blue Of Your Backdrop"; 3. / "Brad And David's Theme"; 4. / "High In The Middle"; 5. / "Hum Drums"; 6. / "Bear's Country"; 7. / "Made My Statement (Love You Baby)"; 8. / "Don't Let Your Goodbye Stand"; 9. / "Lopez"; 10. / "Blue Of The Backdrop [Instrumental]"; 11. / "Tunnel Of Love"; 12. / "Pipeline Sequence"	
1973	Honk	20th Century Records	No. / Title / Length; 1. / "I Wanna Do for You"; 2. / "So Much Easier"; 3. / "Don't Let Your Goodbye Stand"; 4. / "Circles In Sand"; 5. / "Caught On A Greyhound"; 6. / "Another Light"; 7. / "We're On Wheels"; 8. / "Hidin' Out"; 9. / "I Wanna Stay"; 10. / "Money Slips Through My Fingers"; 11. / "Buckeyed Jim"; 12. / "Pipeline Sequence"	
1973	[live track]	[no label]	No. / Title / Length; 1. / "Heatwave"	
1974	Honk	Epic Records	No. / Title / Length; 1. / "Move Me"; 2. / "Home"; 3. / "All My Time Is Free"; 4. / "Hesitation"; 5. / "You Better Do Something"; 6. / "Gimme That Wine"; 7. / "Dog At Your Door"; 8. / "Where Is Love (And When Will It Come To Me)"; 9. / "Oh Daddy Blues (You Won't Have No Mamma At All)"; 10. / "Mademoiselle"; 11. / "There Is A River"	
1991	Coach House Live	Restless Records	No. / Title / Length; 1. / "Hesitation [Live]"; 2. / "Made My Statement (Love You Baby) [Live]"; 3. / "Coloured Water [Live]"; 4. / "Every Part Of Love [Live]"; 5. / "Move Me [Live]"; 6. / "Summer [Live]"; 7. / "Try To Remember [Live]"; 8. / "Don't Let Your Goodbye Stand [Live]"; 9. / "Pipeline Sequence [Live]"	
2004	Honk [Expanded Edition of 1973]	Hip-O Select	No. / Title / Length; 1. / "I Wanna Do for You"; 2. / "So Much Easier"; 3. / "Don't Let Your Goodbye Stand"; 4. / "Circles In Sand"; 5. / "Caught On A Greyhound"; 6. / "Another Light"; 7. / "We're On Wheels"; 8. / "Hidin' Out"; 9. / "I Wanna Stay"; 10. / "Money Slips Through My Fingers"; 11. / "Buckeyed Jim"; 12. / "Pipeline Sequence"; 13. / "Fortune Wheel"; 14. / "Dog At Your Door [1973 Version]"; 15. / "All My Time Is Free [1973 Version]"; 16. / "There Is a River [1973 Version]"; 17. / "(Love Is Like A) Heat Wave [1973 Live Version]"; 18. / "Love Ain't So Common"; 19. / "Please Remember"; 20. / "No One Is Waiting [1973 Version]"	

== Videography ==
- (1994) Five Summer Stories, film soundtrack

== Facts ==
- (1974) At San Marino High School (prior to their popularity), Van Halen opened for Honk during a performance for the students
