= Sweet Tracks =

Series of Christmas music albums issued by Best Buy

Sweet Tracks is a series of Christmas music albums issued by Best Buy in the United States, originally on CD from 2003 to 2005, but changed to digital downloads in 2006.

== Sweet Tracks CDs (2003–2005) ==
The series was originally intended as a bonus for members of Reward Zone, Best Buy's loyalty program which was also introduced in 2003. Since at that time customers had to pay $9.95 per year to enroll in the Reward Zone program (though the company did grant free renewals to some customers), it was apparently intended as a "Christmas gift" to offset the cost of membership.

The end of the CD series appears to have been the result of changes to the Reward Zone program which eliminated the annual fee; these changes were tested in Ohio in 2005, then rolled out nationwide in 2006. It is unclear if or how the 2005 CD was distributed in Ohio.

The original Sweet Tracks CDs were notable in that they were issued in metal tins resembling a large mint. They also contained several recordings that were generally not available on other albums in the U.S.

=== Sweet Tracks 2003 ===
1. "2000 Miles" – Coldplay
2. "Make Someone Happy" – Seal
3. "Blue Christmas" – Jewel
4. "O Come All Ye Faithful" – Chris Botti
5. "Bethlehem Down" – Sting

=== Sweet Tracks 2004 ===
1. "Do They Know It's Christmas?" – Pete Yorn
2. "Deck the Halls" – Dave Koz
3. "Christmas In America" – Melissa Etheridge
4. "What Child Is This?" – Train
5. "I'll Be Home for Christmas" – Chris Isaak
6. "Happy Christmas (War Is Over)" – Maroon 5
7. "Carol of the Bells – Phantom Planet
8. "Makin' Whoopie" – Elton John
9. "Celebrate Me Home (For the Holidays)" – Kenny Loggins

=== Sweet Tracks 2005 ===
1. "Santa Baby" – Pussycat Dolls
2. "O Holy Night" – Kaci Brown
3. "Snowed Under" – Keane
4. "Silent Night" – Lifehouse
5. "Someday at Christmas" – Mary J. Blige
6. "Lullaby For An Anxious Child" – Sting
7. "Lo, How a Rose E're Blooming" – Feist
8. "Christmas Come To The Ghetto" – Avant

== Sweet Tracks downloads (2006) ==
For 2006, Best Buy restructured the Sweet Tracks series into a promotion for the Best Buy Digital Music Store (BBDMS), Best Buy's rebranded version of the Rhapsody online music service.

=== Sweet Tracks 2006 ===
There were two versions of the 2006 download promotion, which was only available until December 31, 2006:

- Anyone in the U.S. could visit the Best Buy website, join BBDMS if necessary, and qualify to download the 14 tracks in the Sweet Tracks 2006 album for free. (Though BBDMS once required a paid Rhapsody subscription, at this time BBDMS is offering the free "Rhapsody 25" plan.) If an email address was enrolled in any other version of Rhapsody, users had to enroll another email address in BBDMS to download the tracks (see below).
- Sweet Tracks 2006 packages, in candy bar-like wrappers, were distributed at Best Buy stores in the U.S. on Black Friday (November 24), though some stores still had them for at least a couple weeks thereafter. Inside the package were instructions to go to a slightly different version of the Sweet Tracks page to download the 14 tracks along with 5 bonus tracks, along with a redemption code for the 5 bonus tracks. Though not expressly stated in the package, these customers also had to join BBDMS if necessary; the bonus was a five-download credit for your choice of tracks from BBDMS.

The 14 tracks of the Sweet Tracks 2006 album were not clearly available for download from BBDMS until mid-December, though Best Buy continued to advertise the promotion online and in stores; email correspondence with Rhapsody technical support on December 5 confirmed that "(a)ll customer's attempting to download these tracks are experiencing the same download issue." Nonetheless, the complete album was available within BBDMS by searching for the album title "Sweet Tracks", then clicking on the appropriate "Buy" button. The initial problem appeared to involve a bad link from the Best Buy website.

Users finding the Sweet Tracks album page with all the "Buy" buttons greyed out, were likely enrolled in a non-BBDMS version of Rhapsody; only BBDMS enrollees were authorized to download the album. (Some may not have been aware of their prior Rhapsody enrollment if they once enrolled in the "Rhapsody 25" plan but later uninstalled Rhapsody without cancelling their enrollment.) This was confirmed in email correspondence with Rhapsody technical support on December 21, 2006, which stated: "Under the email address (...) I show you have a Real Rhapsody membership which would not entitle you to the Sweet Tracks promotion and would cause the tracks to be grayed out. If you have a Best Buy Digital Music membership under a different email address please sign into Rhapsody using that email address instead." A new BBDMS registration from a different email address enabled the "Buy" buttons.

The 5 bonus tracks were redeemable by entering the redemption code into the BBDMS account to obtain the five-download credit. Unlike the Sweet Tracks themselves, they could be redeemed from the beginning, and can be redeemed by non-BBDMS Rhapsody users as well.

Since the 14 album tracks (as well as the five free downloads) are distributed thru Rhapsody as "purchased" downloads, they are all RAX-format files encoded with Helix DRM. Like all other RAX files, the Rhapsody software can burn them to CD, or transfer them to any MP3 player that supports purchased Windows Media Audio DRM (including most current non-Apple players); its Harmony plug-in may also be able to transfer them to an iPod, depending on the current status of the plug-in and your iPod firmware. (Apple occasionally modifies iPod firmware to block Harmony; RealNetworks then tries to modify Harmony in response.)

1. "White Christmas" – Keith Urban
2. "The Christmas Song" – New Found Glory (not the Mel Tormé classic, but a song called "Ex-Miss," mistitled)
3. "Lo, How a Rose E're Blooming" – Feist (same as 2005)
4. "Christmas In America" – Melissa Etheridge (same as 2004)
5. "Candy Maker" – Holly Brook
6. "Hark The Herald Angels Sing" – Dave Koz
7. "Do You Hear What I Hear?" – Flyleaf
8. "Silent Night" – Lifehouse (same as 2005)
9. "Deck the Halls" – Brian Wilson
10. "Joy to the World" – Nick Lachey
11. "What Child Is This?" – Train (same as 2004)
12. "O Little Town of Bethlehem" – Chris Botti
13. "The Holly and the Ivy" – Lucy Walsh
14. "O Holy Night" – Kaci Brown (same as 2005)
