= Welcome to Heartlight =

Single by Kenny Loggins

from the album High Adventure
- B-side: "Only a Miracle"
- Released: 1983
- Genre: Soft rock
- Length: 3:56
- Label: Columbia
- Songwriter: Kenny Loggins

Kenny Loggins singles chronology
"Heart to Heart" (1982)	"Welcome to Heartlight" (1983)	"Footloose" (1984)

"Welcome to Heartlight" is a Kenny Loggins song from his 1982 concept album, High Adventure.

While many fans perceive this song as being inspired by the Steven Spielberg film E.T. the Extra-Terrestrial, it is really about a school in Southern California that's actually called "Heartlight". The song was inspired by writings from students from that school. On most pressings of High Adventure and on some Loggins greatest hits compilation albums, it is officially titled simply "Heartlight". The title was expanded to "Welcome to Heartlight" to avoid confusion with Neil Diamond's song also called "Heartlight".

It was released as a single in early 1983 and peaked at number 24 on the U.S. Billboard Hot 100 and number 17 on the Adult Contemporary chart.

== Personnel ==
- Kenny Loggins – lead vocals, guitar, guitar solo
- Mike Hamilton – guitar
- Vernon Porter – bass guitar
- Tris Imboden – drums
- Steve Forman – percussion
- Paulinho da Costa – congas
- The Heartlight School Singers and Dancers Christ Memorial Youth Choir – choir
- Phyllis St. James – choir contractor
- B. J. Crouch & Mrs. Norman Basely — choir directors

== Charts ==
Chart performance for "Welcome to Heartlight"
Chart (1983)	Peak position
Canada Top Singles (RPM)	37
Netherlands (Single Top 100)	35
US Billboard Hot 100	24
US Adult Contemporary (Billboard)	17
