= Five Summer Stories =

1972 film by Greg MacGillivray

- Theatrical release poster
- Story by: Jim Freeman; Greg MacGillivray
- Starring: David Nuuhiwa; Eddie Aikau; Gerry Lopez; Sam Hawk
- Music by: Honk
- Production company: MacGillivray Freeman Films
- Release date: 1972
- Country: United States
- Language: English

Five Summer Stories is a 1972 surf film by Jim Freeman and Greg MacGillivray of MacGillivray Freeman Films. The last film of the genre by the duo, it explores the joy of surfing amid the backdrop of 1970s political and environmental problems. Its stars include David Nuuhiwa, Eddie Aikau, Gerry Lopez, and Sam Hawk.

The film's backstory dates two years prior, when MacGillivray and Freeman decided they will end their surf filmmaking career, and conceived Five Summer Stories as their closure for the surfing community. The film was cinematographed by Bud Browne, with principal photography occurring for months in Hawaii. Editing included the creation of animation by John Lamb, who was among the first to animate surfing and skateboarding. The Beach Boys, an American rock band, offered their music into the film, while Honk composed the score. The poster used an original painting by Rick Griffin.

Five Summer Stories premiered at the Santa Monica Civic Auditorium on March 24, 1972. Its VHS re-release was in 1994, followed by a DVD release. Honk's soundtrack album was released on LP record format in 1972 and re-released on CD in 1992. Called a "cinematic cult classic", the film is generally acknowledged as the start of the second generation of surf films, with the first generation being typified by Bruce Brown's The Endless Summer. A 50th-anniversary edition, featuring remastered audiovisual quality and two new sequences, is slated to be released in August 2022.

== Soundtrack charts ==
Chart (1973)	Peak position
Australian (Kent Music Report)	29

== See also ==
- List of American films of 1972
