= I'm Alright (Kenny Loggins song) =

1980 song performed by Kenny Loggins

Single by Kenny Loggins

from the album Caddyshack
- B-side: "Lead the Way"
- Released: July 7, 1980
- Genre: Rock
- Length: 3:46
- Label: Columbia
- Songwriter: Kenny Loggins
- Producers: Kenny Loggins; Bruce Botnick

Kenny Loggins singles chronology
"Keep the Fire" (1980)	"I'm Alright" (1980)	"Don't Fight It" (1982)

Audio video
- "I'm Alright" on YouTube

"I'm Alright" is a song written and performed by American rock musician Kenny Loggins. It was used as the theme music for the 1980 comedy film Caddyshack. The track was released as a single in 1980 and then reached the top 10 of the U.S. singles chart. Eddie Money makes a guest appearance in the song's background chorus. The song is also one of the most frequent choices in Loggins' concerts, and included in all three of his official concert material releases – Kenny Loggins Alive, Live from Grand Canyon, and Outside: From the Redwoods.

Loggins spoke of the song in his 2022 memoir, noting it was released in the beginning era of the movie soundtracks with "big" pop songs. He describes the song: " "I'm Alright" was me doing Gerry Rafferty doing Bob Dylan. "

== Track listing ==
7" vinyl

1. "I'm Alright" (Loggins) – 3:25
2. "Lead the Way" (Loggins, Eva Ein Loggins) – 4:27

== Chart performance ==
Chart (1980)	Peak position
Australia (Kent Music Report)	53
Canadian RPM Singles Chart	5
Netherlands	44
New Zealand (RIANZ)	50
South Africa (Springbok)	5
U.S. Billboard Hot 100	7

== Personnel ==
- Kenny Loggins – lead vocals, guitar
- Mike Hamilton – guitar, backing vocals
- George Hawkins – bass, backing vocals
- Brian Mann – keyboards, backing vocals
- Tris Imboden – drums, backing vocals
- Mark Wittenberg – guitar
- Eddie Money – backing vocals, lead vocals on the bridge
