= Jim Messina =

Jim, James, or Jimmy Messina may refer to:

- Jim Messina (musician) (born 1947), American singer and bassist
- Jim Messina (political staffer) (born 1969), American political advisor to Barack Obama
