= Heart to Heart (Kenny Loggins song) =

- Side A of the US single

Single by Kenny Loggins

from the album High Adventure
- B-side: "The More We Try"
- Released: November 1982
- Recorded: 1982
- Genre: Soft rock; R&B
- Length: 3:55 (single version); 5:20 (album version)
- Label: Columbia
- Songwriters: Kenny Loggins; Michael McDonald; David Foster
- Producers: Kenny Loggins; Bruce Botnick

Kenny Loggins singles chronology
"Don't Fight It" (1982)	"Heart to Heart" (1982)	"Welcome to Heartlight" (1983)

Audio video
- "Heart to Heart" on YouTube

"Heart to Heart" is a song by American musician Kenny Loggins, co-written with Michael McDonald, and composer David Foster. It was released in November 1982 by Columbia Records as the second of three singles from his 1982 album High Adventure. It reached number 15 on the US Billboard Hot 100 and spent five weeks in that position, from late January through late February 1983. It spent a total of 13 weeks in the Top 40, and 17 weeks on the Hot 100. It also reached number 15 on the US Cash Box Top 100.

"Heart to Heart" was also very successful on the Adult Contemporary charts, reaching number three in the US and number one in Canada.

== Background ==
The song speaks of the mutual opening of hearts as being the only way to preserve a relationship once the partners have allowed themselves to grow apart. The lyrics acknowledge that most relationships do not endure the test of time, yet still some are able to do so. It features a saxophone solo by David Sanborn.

== Personnel ==
- Kenny Loggins – lead vocals
- Mike Hamilton – guitar
- Michael McDonald – Rhodes piano - backing vocals
- Neil Larsen – string arrangement
- David Foster – grand piano, string arrangement
- Darek Jackson – bass guitar
- Tris Imboden – drums
- Paulinho da Costa – congas
- Lenny Castro – percussion
- David Sanborn – saxophone
- Marty Paich – string arrangements
- Richard Page – backing vocals
- Steve George – backing vocals

== Charts ==
=== Weekly charts ===
Chart (1982–1983)	Peak position
Canada Top Singles (RPM)	39
Canada Adult Contemporary (RPM)	1
US Billboard Hot 100	15
US Adult Contemporary (Billboard)	3
US Hot Black Singles (Billboard)	71
US Cash Box Top 100	15

=== Year-end charts ===
Chart (1983)	Rank
US Billboard Hot 100	72
US Cash Box Top 100	100
