= Don't Fight It (Kenny Loggins and Steve Perry song) =

Single by Kenny Loggins and Steve Perry

from the album High Adventure
- B-side: "The More We Try"
- Released: August 12, 1982
- Genre: Rock, soft rock
- Length: 3:37
- Label: Columbia
- Songwriters: Kenny Loggins, Steve Perry, Dean Pitchford
- Producers: Bruce Botnick, Kenny Loggins

Kenny Loggins singles chronology
"I'm Alright" (1980)	"Don't Fight It" (1982)	"Heart to Heart" (1982)

"Don't Fight It" is a rock song performed by Kenny Loggins and Steve Perry, the lead singer for Journey at that time. It is included on Loggins' 1982 album High Adventure.

== Background ==
Loggins has described the song as 'an experiment in pushing my limits to include rock', from the liner notes of his 1997 compilation Yesterday, Today, Tomorrow.

According to Loggins, the bullwhip sound effect in the song was created using a whip that was also used for the Indiana Jones movies.

It was released as a single on August 12, 1982. It peaked at number 17 on the US Billboard Hot 100 and #15 on the Cash Box Top 100. It was nominated for Best Rock Performance by a Duo or Group with Vocal at the 1983 Grammy Awards.

== Track listing ==
US 7" single

1. "Don't Fight It" – 3:37
2. "The More We Try" – 3:59

== Credits and personnel ==
- Kenny Loggins – co-lead vocals and rhythm guitar
- Steve Perry – co-lead vocals
- Neil Giraldo – lead guitar
- Mike Hamilton – bass
- Dennis Conway – drums
- Tris Imboden – percussion

== Chart performance ==
Chart performance for "Don't Fight It"
Chart (1982–1983)	Peak position
Canada Top Singles (RPM)	7
US Billboard Hot 100	17
US Mainstream Rock (Billboard)	4
