= Nobody's Fool (Kenny Loggins song) =

Single by Kenny Loggins

from the album Caddyshack II soundtrack/ Back to Avalon
- B-side: "I'm Gonna Do It Right"
- Released: 1988
- Recorded: 1987
- Genre: Pop rock
- Length: 4:18
- Label: Columbia
- Songwriters: Kenny Loggins, Michael Towers
- Producer: Dennis Lambert

Kenny Loggins singles chronology
"Meet Me Half Way" (1987)	"Nobody's Fool" (1988)	"I'm Gonna Miss You" (1988)

Music video
- "Nobody's Fool" on YouTube

"Nobody's Fool", sometimes titled "Nobody's Fool (Theme from Caddyshack II)", is a song by American pop singer Kenny Loggins, from the 1988 golf comedy film Caddyshack II. Written by Loggins and Michael Towers, the song reached the top 10 of the US singles chart. It also appeared as the opening track on Loggins' 1988 studio album Back to Avalon.

== Background ==
Kenny Loggins had composed and recorded "I'm Alright" for the 1980 Caddyshack film, and film producer Jon Peters asked him to write a theme song for the sequel. Initially, Loggins admitted, "I wasn't so sure when he called about Caddyshack II. I was a little skittish about trusting lightning to strike twice in the same place."

== Release and reception ==
"Nobody's Fool" entered the U.S. Billboard Hot 100 chart in July 1988, and peaked at number eight. It was the fourth top 10 song from a film soundtrack for Loggins, who was already the first male solo artist ever to have three top 10 singles from three different films, and spent 18 weeks on the Hot 100. It also reached number six on the Singles Sales chart, number 42 on the Adult Contemporary chart, number 10 on the Hot 100 Airplay chart, number 30 on the Mainstream Rock chart, and number 11 on the Canadian Singles Chart.

== Track listing ==
7-inch single (Columbia – 38–07971)

1. "Nobody's Fool" (Loggins, Towers) – 4:17
2. "I'm Gonna Do It Right" (Loggins) – 4:40

== Personnel ==
- Kenny Loggins – lead and background vocals, guitar
- Claude Gaudette – keyboards, programming, arrangements
- Dann Huff – guitar
- Jeff Pescetto – background vocals
- Dennis Lambert – producer
- Michael Dilbeck – executive producer
- Brian Malouf – mixing
- David Bianco, Doug Rider – engineers

== Chart performance ==
Chart performance for "Nobody's Fool"
Chart (1988)	Peak position
Canada Top Singles (RPM)	11
US Billboard Hot 100	8
US Mainstream Rock (Billboard)	30
US Adult Contemporary (Billboard)	42
