= The Unimaginable Life =

Studio album by Kenny Loggins
- Released: July 8, 1997
- Recorded: 1997
- Studios: A&M Studios, Conway Studios and Music Grinder Studios (Hollywood, California); Record Plant, Westlake Studios and Signet Sound Studios (Los Angeles, California); Gateway Studios (Carpinteria, California); WallyWorld Studios (San Francisco, California); Oak Springs Studio (Oak Springs, Arizona); Sony Music Studios (New York City, New York); Barking Doctor Recording (Mount Kisco, New York)
- Genre: Soft rock
- Length: 76:03
- Label: Columbia
- Producers: Kenny Loggins; Walter Afanasieff; Randy Jackson; John Barnes

Kenny Loggins chronology
Return to Pooh Corner (1994)	The Unimaginable Life (1997)	December (1998)

Professional ratings
Review scores
Source	Rating
Allmusic	3/5 stars

The Unimaginable Life is the ninth studio album by American singer-songwriter Kenny Loggins, released on July 8, 1997, to coincide with his book of the same name that he co-wrote with his second wife, Julia. The liner notes include excerpts from the book.

== Track listing ==
1. "Let the Pendulum Swing"; Poem written and read by Julia Loggins (Julia Loggins, Steve Wood) – 2:17
2. "Just Breathe" (Loggins, Chris Rodriguez, Steve George) – 6:10
3. "I Am Not Hiding" (Loggins, Steve George) – 5:05
4. "All I Ask" (Loggins, Babyface) – 6:00
5. "Now That I Know Love" (Loggins, Steve George) – 7:03
6. "The Art of Letting Go" (Loggins, Michael Ruff) – 7:28
7. "One Chance at a Time" (Loggins, Glen Ballard) – 7:18
8. "Love's Got Nothin' to Prove" (Loggins, John Barnes) – 5:27
9. "This Island Earth" (Loggins) – 5:20
10. "No Doubt About Love" (Loggins, Babyface) – 4:26
11. "The Rest of Your Life" (K. Loggins, Julia Loggins, Jonathan Butler) – 4:57
12. "Birth Energy" (Loggins) – 6:41
13. "The Unimaginable Life" (Loggins, David Foster) – 6:05
14. "Your Spirit and My Spirit" (Loggins) – 1:46

== Personnel ==
Musicians and Vocalists

- Kenny Loggins – vocals
- Steve George – keyboards
- Greg Phillinganes – keyboards
- Michael Ruff – keyboards
- John Barnes – Synclavier, drum programming
- Walter Afanasieff – keyboards (3, 13), drum programming (3, 13)
- Dan Shea – keyboards (3, 13), programming (3, 13), sound design (3, 13)
- Kevin Maloney – programming, sound design
- Mitch Marcoulier – programming, sound design
- Gary Cimirelli – programming (3, 13), sound design (3, 13)
- Vernon "Ice" Black – guitars
- Earl Klugh – guitars
- Michael Landau – guitars
- Ray Parker Jr. – guitars
- Dean Parks – guitars
- Tim Pierce – guitars
- Fred Tackett – guitars
- Michael Thompson – guitars
- Nathan East – bass
- Randy Jackson – bass
- Tony Levin – bass
- Freddie Washington – bass
- Steve Ferrone – drums
- Omar Hakim – drums
- Tris Imboden – drums
- John Robinson – drums
- John Lehmkhul – drum programming
- Zakir Hussain – percussion
- Munyungo Jackson – percussion
- Peter Michaels – percussion
- Kevin Ricard – percussion
- Bill Summers – percussion
- John Zeretzke – duduk (2), Native American flute (2), midwiz (2)
- Everette Harp – saxophone
- Karen Briggs – violin solo
- Joey Diggs – backing vocals
- Jim Gilstrap – backing vocals
- Bobbi Page – backing vocals
- Chris Rodriguez – backing vocals
- Howard Smith – backing vocals
- Lamont Van Hook – backing vocals
- Carvin Winans – backing vocals
- Lynn Davis – backing vocals (3, 13)
- Sandy Griffith – backing vocals (3, 13)
- Phillip Ingram – backing vocals (3, 13)
- Skyler Jett – backing vocals (3, 13)
- Conesha Owens – backing vocals (3, 13)
- Claytoven Richardson – backing vocals (3, 13)
- Jeanie Tracy – backing vocals (3, 13)
- Joey Blake – backing vocals (7)
- Karla Bonoff – backing vocals (7)
- Agape Choir of Santa Monica & Family – choir (12)

Music arrangements

- Kenny Loggins – arrangements
- John Barnes – arrangements (2, 5, 7–9, 11, 12)
- Walter Afanasieff – arrangements (3, 13)
- Tim Pierce – arrangements (4)
- Jeremy Lubbock – string arrangements and conductor
- Mervyn Warren – vocal arrangements

== Production ==
- Kenny Loggins – producer
- Walter Afanasieff – producer (3, 13)
- Randy Jackson – additional production (3, 13), producer (6, 10)
- John Barnes – producer (11)
- Chuck Randall-Raggio – album coordinator
- Ann Cutting – photography
- Jimmy Ienner Jr. – flower photography
- Higher Vision, Inc. – management

Technical credits

- Joe Gastwirt – mastering at Oceanview Digital Mastering (Los Angeles, California)
- Allen Abrahamson – engineer
- Bob Brown – engineer
- Juan Garza – engineer
- Humberto Gatica – engineer
- David Gleeson – engineer
- Cal Harris – engineer
- Nathaniel Kunkel – engineer, mixing (6, 10)
- John Kurlander – engineer
- Gil Morales – engineer
- Jeremy "J." Most – engineer
- David Reitzas – engineer, mixing (4, 5)
- Steve MacMillan – mixing (2, 11, 12)
- Mick Guzauski – mixing (3, 7–9, 13)
- Stuart Brawley – second engineer
- Chris Brooke – second engineer
- Martin Christensen – second engineer
- Greg Collins – second engineer
- Troy Gonzalez – second engineer
- Tim Lauber – second engineer
- Tyson Leeper – second engineer
- Jon Mooney – second engineer
- Chris Roberts – second engineer
