= Meet Me Half Way =

1987 song by Kenny Loggins

Single by Kenny Loggins

from the album Over The Top: Original Motion Picture Soundtrack; Back to Avalon
- B-side: "Semifinal (Giorgio Moroder)"
- Released: March 1987
- Recorded: 1986
- Genre: Pop rock; soft rock; adult contemporary
- Length: 3:39 (album version); 3:31 (single version)
- Label: Columbia
- Songwriters: Giorgio Moroder; Tom Whitlock
- Producer: Giorgio Moroder

Kenny Loggins singles chronology
"Playing with the Boys" (1986)	"Meet Me Half Way" (1987)	"Nobody's Fool" (1988)

Music video
- "Meet Me Half Way" on YouTube

"Meet Me Half Way" is a song by American singer Kenny Loggins written by Giorgio Moroder and Tom Whitlock for the film Over the Top. It also appears as the final track on his sixth studio album Back to Avalon. It was his sixth soundtrack single and also his 13th Top 40 single, peaking at number 11, while it was more successful on the Adult Contemporary chart, peaking at number two.

== Release ==
The single debuted at number 95 on the Billboard Hot 100 and spent twenty-five weeks on the chart, peaking at number 11 in the week of June 13, 1987. It was ranked 96th on the Billboard Year-End Hot 100 singles of 1987. It also peaked at number 28 on the Canadian RPM 100 chart.

== Music video ==
The music video shows Loggins walking to a bar where he starts singing, then walks on a highway carrying his guitar. He then stops to sit at a nearby stand and walks into the desert. Clips from the movie play throughout the music video.

== Track listing ==
1. "Meet Me Half Way" – 3:31
2. "Semifinal" (Giorgio Moroder) – 3:45

== Personnel ==
- Kenny Loggins – vocals
- Giorgio Moroder – synthesizers, producer
- Richie Zito – guitar
- Dann Huff – guitar
- Brian Banks – synthesizers
- Anthony Marinelli – synthesizers
- Terry Wilson – synthesizers
- Brian Reeves – engineer and mixing
- Brian Gardner – mastering

== Charts ==
Chart (1987)	Peak position
Canada Top Singles (RPM)	28
Canada Adult Contemporary (RPM)	1
US Billboard Hot 100	11
US Adult Contemporary (Billboard)	2
