= Nightwatch (album) =

Studio album by Kenny Loggins
- Released: July 12, 1978
- Recorded: 1977–1978
- Studio: SoundMixers (New York City)
- Genres: Rock; soft rock
- Length: 41:20
- Label: Columbia
- Producer: Bob James

Kenny Loggins chronology
Celebrate Me Home (1977)	Nightwatch (1978)	Keep the Fire (1979)

Professional ratings
Review scores
Source	Rating
AllMusic	4/5 stars
Rolling Stone	(mixed)

Nightwatch is the second studio album by American singer-songwriter Kenny Loggins, released in 1978. The album is Loggins' highest charting album on the Billboard 200 to date, reaching number 7.

The lead single, "Whenever I Call You 'Friend'" featuring Fleetwood Mac's Stevie Nicks (co-written with Melissa Manchester), reached number 5 on the Billboard Hot 100. The second and final single, "Easy Driver", peaked at number 60 in early 1979. This album also featured the first released version of the Doobie Brothers' "What a Fool Believes", which Loggins co-wrote with the Doobies' Michael McDonald.

Most of the artists on this album represent Loggins' original band from 1977 to 1980.

== Track listing ==
Music and lyrics composed by Kenny Loggins unless otherwise stated.

Side one
No.	Title	Lyrics	Music	Length
1.	"Nightwatch"	K. Loggins, Dan Loggins	K. Loggins, Max Gronenthal	7:49
2.	"Easy Driver"	David Plenn, Jerry Riopelle	Plenn, Riopelle	3:33
3.	"Down 'N' Dirty"	K. Loggins, Eva Ein	K. Loggins, Brian Mann	4:42
4.	"Down in the Boondocks"	Joe South	South	4:20

Side two
No.	Title	Lyrics	Music	Length
5.	"Whenever I Call You 'Friend'" (duet with Stevie Nicks)	K. Loggins, Melissa Manchester		3:57
6.	"Wait a Little While"	K. Loggins, Ein		3:55
7.	"What a Fool Believes"	K. Loggins, Michael McDonald	K. Loggins, McDonald	3:37
8.	"Somebody Knows"			3:34
9.	"Angelique"	K. Loggins, Ein		5:53
Total length:				41:20

== Charts ==
Chart (1978)	Peak position
Australia (Kent Music Report)	70
Canada Top Albums/CDs (RPM)	11
US Billboard 200	7

== Personnel ==
=== Musicians ===
- Kenny Loggins – lead vocals, backing vocals, guitars
- Mike Hamilton – guitars, backing vocals
- George Hawkins – bass, backing vocals
- Brian Mann – piano, keyboards, synthesizers, organ
- Tris Imboden – drums, harmonica
- Jon Clarke – horns, woodwinds
- Vince Denham – horns
- Bob James – string arrangements
- Stevie Nicks – co-lead vocals (5)

=== Technical ===
- Produced by Bob James
- Engineered by Joe Jorgensen and John Pace
- Cover concept – David Alexander and Kenny Loggins
- Photography – David Alexander
- Lettering concept – Marilyn Romen
- Management – Larson & Recor Associates
