= I Believe in Love (Kenny Loggins song) =

Single by Kenny Loggins

from the album Celebrate Me Home
- A-side: "Evergreen (Love Theme from A Star Is Born)"
- Released: July 1977
- Genre: Soft rock
- Length: 3:30
- Label: Columbia
- Composer: Kenny Loggins
- Lyricists: Alan Bergman; Marilyn Bergman
- Producers: Phil Ramone; Bob James

Kenny Loggins singles chronology
"Celebrate Me Home" (1977)	"I Believe in Love" (1977)	"Whenever I Call You "Friend"" (1978)

"I Believe in Love" is the debut solo single by American musician Kenny Loggins. It was written by Loggins with lyrics by Alan and Marilyn Bergman. The song was introduced by Barbra Streisand in the 1976 film A Star Is Born, and appears on its soundtrack album. It was released in November 1976 as the B-side to the album's first single, "Evergreen (Love Theme from A Star Is Born)".

Loggins later recorded it for his debut solo album Celebrate Me Home and released it as the album's first single in the summer of 1977. It became Loggins' first charting single, reaching number 66 on the U.S. Billboard Hot 100 and number 37 on the Easy Listening chart. In Canada, the song reached number 45 on the main singles chart and number 41 on the AC chart.

== Personnel ==
- Kenny Loggins – lead and background vocals
- Ralph MacDonald – tambourine
- Jon Clarke – sopranino recorder solo, recorder consort
- Bob James – keyboards
- Harvey Mason – drums
- George Hawkins – bass guitar, background vocals
- Robben Ford – acoustic guitar
- Hugh McCracken – acoustic guitar
- Lee Ritenour – electric guitar

== Charts ==
=== Kenny Loggins version ===
Chart (1977)	Peak position
Canada Adult Contemporary (RPM)	41
Canada Top Singles (RPM)	45
U.S. Billboard Hot 100	66
U.S. Billboard Easy Listening	37
U.S. Cash Box Top 100	53

== Cover versions ==
- Rosemary Clooney and Woody Herman and Woody's Big Band recorded "I Believe in Love" for the album My Buddy (1983).
- Johnny Mathis's version appears on his Live album (1983).
- Deanna Dubbin's version appears on her With One More Look at You album (2005).
- Jim Speake's version appears on his My Generation album (2010).
- Andrea McArdle's version appears on her 70s and Sunny - Live at 54 Below album (2013).
