= Celebrate Me Home (song) =

Song by Kenny Loggins

from the album Celebrate Me Home
- Released: April 1977
- Genre: Pop
- Length: 4:41
- Label: Columbia
- Songwriters: Kenny Loggins, Bob James
- Producers: Phil Ramone, Bob James

Audio video
- "Celebrate Me Home" on YouTube

"Celebrate Me Home" is a song written by Bob James and Kenny Loggins, and recorded by Loggins as the title track of his 1977 debut solo album Celebrate Me Home.

== Release ==
Though not commercially released as a single, the promotional single reached No. 64 on the Record World Singles Chart. It evolved into one of Loggins' better-known songs, especially as it became a popular staple of radio stations' Christmas music playlists due to its opening line ("Home for the holidays"). It is included on Loggins' Yesterday, Today, Tomorrow and The Essential compilations, as well as his 1993 Outside: From the Redwoods live album. Its Christmastime presence is exemplified by its appearance on Best Buy's Sweet Tracks 2004 set.

== Personnel ==
- Kenny Loggins – lead and background vocals
- Ralph MacDonald – tambourine
- Bill Eaton – choral arrangement
- Bob James – keyboards
- Harvey Mason – drums
- George Hawkins – bass guitar, background vocals
- Lee Ritenour – electric guitar
- Eric Gale – electric guitar
- Richard Tee – organ

== Other notable versions ==
The song was also sung by Jill Colucci for Disney Channel's 1990 Celebrate Me Home campaign, which is named after the song. The campaign was mostly featured during the channel's Winter, Spring, Summer, and Fall Previews.

Ruben Studdard, winner of American Idol in its second season, recorded a cover of "Celebrate Me Home" to be used as the show's seventh season Top 12 exit song. Produced by Jimmy Jam and Terry Lewis, Studdard's rendition omitted the song's first-line holiday mention, to give it a more general feel. The Studdard recording was made available for iTunes download on March 12, 2008, as Loggins' original recording also prospered from new downloads.

The song was sampled for Common's "Celebrate" on his 2011 album The Dreamer/The Believer.

The cast of the ABC television series Nashville covered the song on their 2014 album Christmas with Nashville.

LeAnn Rimes covered the song on her 2015 album Today Is Christmas as a duet with Gavin DeGraw. The song was released as a promotional single and peaked at No. 12 on the Billboard Adult Contemporary chart.

In 2016, Jennifer Nettles covered the song on her album To Celebrate Christmas.

In 2020, the Christian band CAIN, Elizabeth Chan, and Josh Groban released their own covers of the song.

In 2025, Lizzy McAlpine released a cover of the song.
