= High Adventure =

Studio album by Kenny Loggins
- Released: September 5, 1982
- Recorded: 1982
- Studios: Ocean Way Recording (Los Angeles); Sunset Sound Recorders (Hollywood); 20th Century Fox Music Stage 1 (Hollywood); Fantasy Studios (Berkeley); Padaro Studios (Santa Barbara)
- Genres: Pop rock; soft rock; AOR
- Length: 41:18
- Label: Columbia
- Producers: Bruce Botnick; Kenny Loggins

Kenny Loggins chronology
Kenny Loggins Alive (1980)	High Adventure (1982)	Vox Humana (1985)

Singles from High Adventure
- 1. "Don't Fight It" Released: August 1982; 2. "Heart to Heart" Released: November 1982; 3. "Welcome to Heartlight" Released: February 1983

Professional ratings
Review scores
Source	Rating
AllMusic	4.5/5 stars
Rolling Stone	3/5 stars

High Adventure is the fourth studio album by American singer-songwriter Kenny Loggins, released in September 1982, by Columbia Records. It is best known for its top 40 pop singles "Heart to Heart", "Welcome to Heartlight" and "Don't Fight It"; the latter was co-written by Journey frontman Steve Perry, who also performs on the track. Neil Giraldo, Pat Benatar's husband and guitarist is featured. "Don't Fight It" was nominated for a Grammy Award for Best Rock Performance by a Duo or Group with Vocal.

== Track listing ==
All tracks are written by Kenny Loggins, with additional writers noted.

No.	Title	Writer(s)	Length
1.	"Don't Fight It" (duet with Steve Perry)	Steve Perry, Dean Pitchford	3:37
2.	"Heartlight"		3:56
3.	"I Gotta Try"	Michael McDonald	3:51
4.	"Swear Your Love"		5:07
5.	"The More We Try"	Eva Ein	3:59
6.	"Heart to Heart"	McDonald, David Foster	5:20
7.	"If It's Not What You're Looking For"	Ein, Foster	4:39
8.	"It Must Be Imagination"	Tom Snow	5:38
9.	"Only a Miracle"	McDonald	5:11
Total length:			41:18

== Personnel ==
=== Musicians ===
- Kenny Loggins – lead vocals, backing vocals, rhythm guitar (1), guitars (2, 4), guitar solo (2)
- Neil Giraldo – lead guitar (1), rhythm guitar (1), guitars (8)
- Steve Lukather – guitars (3)
- Mike Hamilton – bass (1), guitars (2–8), orchestra bells (3), guitar solo (4, 7), backing vocals (7)
- Vernon Porter – bass (2, 4)
- Abraham Laboriel – bass (3)
- Darek Jackson – bass (6)
- Nathan East – bass (7)
- Michael McDonald – keyboards (3), Rhodes electric piano (6), acoustic piano (9)
- Steve Wood – keyboards (3, 5, 7), backing vocals (7, 8), Yamaha GS-1 (8), Yamaha CE-20 (8)
- David Paich – Yamaha CS-20 (5)
- James Newton Howard – Prophet-10 (5), Yamaha CS-70 (5), Yamaha GS-1 (5, 9), synthesizer and string arrangements (5), piano (9)
- Neil Larsen – keyboards (5, 7), string arrangements (6)
- David Foster – grand piano (6), string arrangements (6)
- Tom Snow – Prophet-5 (8)
- Albhy Galuten – Synclavier (8)
- Dennis Conway – drums (1)
- Tris Imboden – percussion (1), drums (2–8)
- Steve Forman – percussion (2)
- Paulinho da Costa – congas (2, 6)
- Lenny Castro – percussion (6)
- Jon Clarke – recorders (5)
- David Sanborn – alto saxophone (6)
- Steve Perry – co-lead vocals (1)
- The Heartlight School Singers and Dancers Christ Memorial Youth Choir – children's choir (2)
- Phyllis St. James – choir contractor (2)
- B. J. Crouch – choir director (2)
- Mrs. Norman Basely – choir director (2)
- Richard Page – backing vocals (3, 6)
- Steve George – backing vocals (3, 6)
- Max Gronenthal – backing vocals (8)
- Marty Paich – string arrangements (6, 9)

=== Technical ===
- Produced by Bruce Botnick and Kenny Loggins
- Engineered by Bruce Botnick (1, 3, 6), Mark Ettel (2, 4, 5, 7, 8), Andy Johns (2), Armin Steiner (5, 9)
- Mixdown engineers – Bruce Botnick, Mark Ettel, Rik Pekkonen
- Mastered by Bernie Grundman at A&M Studios (Hollywood, California)
- Digital mixdown & editing by Jim Pace at Digital Magnetics (Hollywood, California)
- SCAMP backup – Nigel Branwell
- Padaro Studios designed & executed by Jerry Smith
- Construction – Torin Knorr
- Album cover and title concept – Paul Mederios and Kenny Loggins
- Photography – Greg Gorman
- Illustration – Jim Heimann
- Management – Larry Larson & Associates (Beverly Hills, California)

== Charts ==
Chart (1982)	Peak position
Canada Top Albums/CDs (RPM)	50
Dutch Albums (Album Top 100)	50
Swedish Albums (Sverigetopplistan)	46
US Billboard 200	13
