= Whenever I Call You "Friend" =

"Whenever I Call You 'Friend'"

Single by Kenny Loggins and Stevie Nicks

from the album Nightwatch
- B-side: "Angelique"
- Released: July 1978
- Genre: Soft rock
- Length: 3:57
- Label: Columbia
- Songwriters: Kenny Loggins; Melissa Manchester
- Producer: Bob James

Kenny Loggins and Stevie Nicks singles chronology
| "I Believe in Love" (1977) | "Whenever I Call You 'Friend'" (1978) | "Easy Driver" (1979) |

Music video
- "Whenever I Call You 'Friend'" on YouTube

"Whenever I Call You 'Friend'" is a song written by Kenny Loggins and Melissa Manchester, which Loggins recorded for his 1978 album Nightwatch. Issued as a single, "Whenever I Call You 'Friend'" reached No. 5 in the autumn of 1978.

"Whenever I Call You 'Friend'" is a duet with Stevie Nicks, who, though credited on the album track, is not credited on the single, making "Whenever I Call You 'Friend'", in effect, Loggins's first major solo hit.

In the Netherlands, the pop charts TV programme TopPop invited Dutch singer Kimm Hekker to stand in as the duet singer next to Loggins, as Nicks did not come over to perform. Nicks did, however, join Loggins for some live duets of the song in 1979.

== Background ==
Nicks recalled that Loggins was difficult to work with in the studio during the song's recording sessions. "I called him Slave Driver Loggins. He cracked the whip on me for two days to get that particular performance." Loggins himself admitted that he "pushed her harder than she was used to in the studio. I just wanted to make a difficult song seem easy and fun, and she certainly delivered that."

Melissa Manchester would say of her one-off songwriting collaboration with Kenny Loggins: "It came out of the oddity of the times - he and I kept running into each other at televised award shows, which were fairly new...We were frequently paired up to present awards together. We would meet and chat in the Green Room, and finally he asked if we could get together and write something. He came to my house one night and we polished off that song."

Manchester would record her own version of the song for her 1979 self-titled album in a duet version with Arnold McCuller. Charles Donovan of AllMusic said Manchester's version was a "far more supple, elegant song" than the Loggins-Nicks duet. In 2012 Manchester, commenting on the absence of her version of "Whenever I Call You Friend" from her retrospective release Playlist: The Very Best of Melissa Manchester, stated: "The reason that it's not [included] is because I don't feel that I have a satisfactory version of the song...Kenny and I have not been able to schedule time to record it together, though we would both like to. We almost got together but our schedules just would not allow it. But the universe is going to create a better time for us to do that." Loggins and Manchester would eventually release a duet together, along with Dave Koz, on October 6, 2023.

== Personnel ==
- Kenny Loggins listed as "Ken Loggins" – lead and backing vocals, guitar
- Stevie Nicks – lead and backing vocals
- Mike Hamilton – guitar, backing vocals
- George Hawkins – bass, backing vocals
- Brian Mann – acoustic piano (intro), electric piano
- Tris Imboden – drums
- Jon Clarke – horns, woodwinds
- Vince Denham – horns
- Bob James – string arrangements

== Chart performance ==
=== Weekly charts ===
| Chart (1978) | Peak position |
|---|---|
| Australia (Kent Music Report) | 26 |
| Canada RPM Top Singles | 3 |
| Canada RPM Adult Contemporary | 7 |
| Netherlands | 15 |
| New Zealand | 40 |
| U.S. Billboard Hot 100 | 5 |
| U.S. Billboard Adult Contemporary | 9 |
| U.S. Cash Box Top 100 | 5 |

=== Year-end charts ===
| Chart (1978) | Rank |
|---|---|
| Canada RPM Top Singles | 15 |
| U.S. Billboard Hot 100 | 83 |
| U.S. Cash Box | 33 |

== Cover versions ==
In 1981 Jeane Manson recorded a French rendering of "Whenever I Call You 'Friend'" titled "Amitié et amour"; a substantial portion of Loggins's vocal from his 1978 recording was grafted onto the track. Credited to "Jeane Manson & Kenny Loggins," it reached number 54 on the French charts. Later, in 1997 Michael Johnson and Alison Krauss recorded their version for Johnson's album Then and Now, which he co-produced with Gary Paczosa and Krauss's brother Viktor. The album was released by Intersound after its closure and acquisition by Platinum Entertainment.
