= Return to Pooh Corner =

Studio album by Kenny Loggins
- Released: May 10, 1994
- Recorded: 1994
- Studios: Gateway Recording (Carpenteria, California); Pack's Place (Shadow Hills, California); Santa Barbara Sound Design (Santa Barbara, California); The Enterprise (Burbank, California); Tejas Recording (Franklin, Tennessee)
- Genres: Children's music, soft rock
- Length: 47:28
- Label: Columbia/Sony
- Producers: Kenny Loggins; Terry Nelson; David Pack

Kenny Loggins chronology
Outside: From the Redwoods (1993)	Return to Pooh Corner (1994)	The Unimaginable Life (1997)

Professional ratings
Review scores
Source	Rating
AllMusic	4.5/5 stars

Return to Pooh Corner is the eighth studio and first children's album by American singer-songwriter Kenny Loggins. The title is a reference to A.A. Milne's 1928 book The House at Pooh Corner. Released in 1994, it features songs written by John Lennon, Rickie Lee Jones, Paul Simon and Jimmy Webb, along with several other traditional children's songs. The songs are described as "music for parents and children to enjoy together". It was a successful album for Loggins, selling over 500,000 copies, and was nominated for a Grammy Award for Best Musical Album for Children. Guest appearances are made by David Crosby and Graham Nash on "All the Pretty Little Ponies", Patti Austin on the "Neverland Medley" and Amy Grant and Gary Chapman on the title track (a rewritten version of "House at Pooh Corner", a song Loggins wrote in high school and had previously recorded with Jim Messina for their 1971 album Sittin' In). Loggins returned to Pooh Corner several years later with 2000's More Songs from Pooh Corner.

== Track listing ==
1. "All the Pretty Little Ponies" (Featuring David Crosby and Graham Nash) (Trad. arr: Loggins, David Pack) – 3:59
2. "Neverland Medley" (with Patti Austin, introduction by Gene Wilder "Reprising" his role of Willy Wonka) – 7:08
  1. "Pure Imagination" (Leslie Bricusse, Anthony Newley)
  2. "Somewhere Out There" (Cynthia Weil, James Horner, Barry Mann)
  3. "Never Never Land" (Comden and Green, Styne)
3. "Return to Pooh Corner" (with Amy Grant, new verse written for his third son) – 4:14
4. "Rainbow Connection" (From The Muppet Movie) (Paul Williams, Kenneth Ascher) – 3:46
5. "St. Judy's Comet" (Paul Simon) – 5:08
6. "The Last Unicorn" (Jimmy Webb) – 3:27
7. "Cody's Song" (Loggins, new version of song from previous Leap of Faith album) – 4:36
8. "The Horses" (Rickie Lee Jones, Walter Becker) – 5:19
9. "Love" (John Lennon) – 5:05
10. "To-Ra-Loo-Ra" (Trad. arr: Loggins, L. Grean) – 4:44

== Personnel ==
Musicians

- Kenny Loggins – vocals, arrangements (1–4, 10), electric guitar (3), acoustic guitar (7)
- Steve Wood – keyboards (1, 3, 4), synth strings (2), bass (2), synthesizers (6)
- Brian Mann – accordion (1, 3, 4, 7), synth vibes (5)
- David Pack – arrangements (1–4), additional synthesizers (2), guitar solo (3), guitars (4), electric guitar (8)
- David Benoit – keyboards (2), arrangements (2), acoustic piano (9)
- Greg Phillinganes – synthesizers (4, 8), synth banjo (4), acoustic piano (6)
- Steve George – synthesizers (5, 9), keyboards (7)
- Dean Parks – guitars (1, 2, 8), acoustic guitar (5), guitar solo (5)
- Chris Rodriguez – guitars (3)
- Chet Atkins – mandocello (5)
- Guy Thomas – second guitar (7)
- Nathan East – bass (1, 3, 8)
- Kevin Ricard – percussion (8)
- Lorin Grean – wooden recorders (1, 10), celtic harp (10), arrangements (10)
- Ed Rockett – penny whistle (1)
- Terry McMillan – harmonica (4, 8), percussion (8)
- Howard Levy – harmonica (7), ocarina (9)

Vocalists

- David Crosby – guest vocals (1)
- Graham Nash – guest vocals (1)
- Patti Austin – vocals (2b)
- Kate Price – backing vocals (2)
- Steve George – backing vocals (3, 5, 7)
- Gary Chapman – guest vocals (3)
- Amy Grant – guest vocals (3)
- Kenny Loggins – backing vocals (5, 7–9)
- David Pack – backing vocals (8)

=== Production ===
- Kenny Loggins – producer, cover concept
- David Pack – producer (1–4, 6, 8)
- Terry Nelson – producer (5, 7, 9, 10), recording, mixing
- Juan Garza – assistant engineer
- Anders Johannson – assistant engineer
- Kevin Simonett – assistant engineer
- Manny Marroquin – mix assistant
- Joe Gastwirt – mastering at Oceanview Digital Mastering (Los Angeles, California)
- Colleen Donahue-Reynolds – production coordinator
- Stephen Walker – art direction
- Heather Cooper – cover artwork
- Catanzaro & Mahdessian – photography
- Denzyl Feigelson – management
