= Conviction of the Heart =

Single by Kenny Loggins

from the album Leap of Faith
- Released: 1991
- Genre: Pop, soft rock, gospel
- Length: 6:52 (album version); 4:33 (single version)
- Label: Columbia
- Songwriters: Kenny Loggins; Guy Thomas
- Producers: Kenny Loggins, Terry Nelson

Music video
- "Conviction of the Heart" on YouTube

"Conviction of the Heart" is a song by American singer-songwriter Kenny Loggins, from his seventh studio album, Leap of Faith (1991). The song is written by Loggins and Guy Thomas, and produced by the former and Terry Nelson. It was released as the album's first single in 1991 by Columbia Records. A live version was also recorded on the album and video for his 1992 live, Outside: From the Redwoods. "Conviction of the Heart" peaked at numbers 45 and 65 on the US Cash Box Top 100 and Billboard Hot 100 charts. Since its release, the song has become one of his signature tunes. The song was hailed as "unofficial anthem of the environmental movement" by Al Gore, when Loggins performed it on Earth Day in 1995 at The National Mall in Washington, D.C.

== Credits and personnel ==
Credits adapted from the album's liner notes.

- Steve Woods – keyboards
- Kenny Loggins – acoustic guitar
- Guy Thomas – electric guitar
- David Lindley – electric slide guitar
- Freddie Washington – bass
- Tris Imboden – drums
- Michael Baird – field snare
- Munyungo Jackson and Bill Summers – caxixi, shekere, dunun, gunga-degung, batá, djembe
- Kate Price and Terry Nelson – background vocals
- Adult Choir – choir (with Arnold McCuller as choir director)
- Colors of Love – children's choir (with Nyna Shannon Anderson as choir director)

== Charts ==
=== Weekly charts ===
Weekly chart performance for "Conviction of the Heart"
Chart (1991)	Peak position
US Billboard Hot 100	65
US Adult Contemporary (Billboard)	9
US Cash Box Top 100	45

=== Year-end charts ===
Year-end chart performance for "Conviction of the Heart"
Chart (1992)	Position
US Adult Contemporary (Billboard)	47
