= Celebrate Me Home =

Studio album by Kenny Loggins
- Released: April 13, 1977
- Recorded: 1976–1977
- Studios: Burbank Studios (Los Angeles); A&R Recording (New York City)
- Genres: Rock; soft rock
- Length: 44:30
- Label: Columbia
- Producers: Phil Ramone; Bob James

Kenny Loggins chronology
Celebrate Me Home (1977)	Nightwatch (1978)

Professional ratings
Review scores
Source	Rating
Allmusic	4/5 stars
Rolling Stone	(mixed)

Celebrate Me Home is the debut studio album by American singer-songwriter Kenny Loggins. It was released on April 13, 1977, by Columbia Records. The album, Loggins' first since Loggins and Messina ended in 1976, represents a slight move away from the folk-rock leanings of his previous recordings towards a more polished, soft rock sound.

Featuring production by Phil Ramone and jazz keyboardist Bob James, Celebrate Me Home peaked at number 27 on the Billboard album charts, and was eventually certified platinum by the RIAA. Loggins would experience even greater commercial and chart success with his next album release, Nightwatch.

Two singles were released from this album. The first was "I Believe In Love", reaching number 66 on the Billboard Hot 100. The track was covered by Barbra Streisand a year earlier for A Star Is Born (1976 soundtrack). The second and final single, "Celebrate Me Home" (edited to 3:51), was released at the end of 1977, but did not initially chart; however, it eventually became a staple of radio playlists during the holidays, and charted on Billboard's Holiday Airplay chart, where it peaked at #1 in 2001.

== Track listing ==
Side one
No.	Title	Lyrics	Music	Length
1.	"Lady Luck"	Kenny Loggins	Loggins, Bob James	4:40
2.	"If You Be Wise"	Jimmy Webb	Loggins	4:25
3.	"I Believe in Love"	Alan Bergman, Marilyn Bergman	Loggins	3:30
4.	"Set It Free"	Loggins, Eva Ein	Loggins	5:56
5.	"Why Do People Lie"	Loggins, Ein	Loggins	4:29

Side two
No.	Title	Lyrics	Music	Length
6.	"Enter My Dream"	Loggins	Loggins	5:20
7.	"I've Got the Melody (Deep in My Heart)"	Patti Austin	Austin	4:12
8.	"Celebrate Me Home"	Loggins	Loggins, James	4:42
9.	"Daddy's Back"	Ein	David Foster	3:32
10.	"You Don't Know Me"	Eddy Arnold, Cindy Walker	Arnold, Walker	4:11
Total length:				44:30

== Personnel ==
=== Musicians ===
- Kenny Loggins – lead vocals, backing vocals (1–8)
- Bob James – keyboards (1–9), Fender Rhodes (10), horn and string arrangements, musical direction
- Richard Tee – organ (8)
- Hiram Bullock – electric guitar solo (1)
- Lee Ritenour – acoustic guitar (1), electric guitar (1, 3, 4, 8), bouzouki (1), mandolin (1)
- Tommy Tedesco – mandolin (1), bouzouki (1), mandola (1)
- Eric Gale – electric guitar (2, 7–10)
- Steve Khan – acoustic guitar (2), electric guitar (7)
- Robben Ford – acoustic guitar (3), electric guitar (4–6, 9)
- Hugh McCracken – acoustic guitar (3, 6)
- Dean Parks – acoustic guitar (4, 5), electric guitar (4, 5)
- George Hawkins – bass (1–9), backing vocals (1–8)
- Harvey Mason – drums (1, 3–6, 8, 9)
- Steve Gadd – drums (2, 7)
- Steve Forman – percussion (1, 4–6, 9)
- Ralph MacDonald – percussion (1), tambourine (3, 7, 8), cabasa (5), congas (5, 7), cowbell (7)
- Laudir de Oliveira – percussion (4–6, 9)
- Jon Clarke – sopranino recorder solo (3), saxophones (5, 9), woodwinds (5, 9), flute (6), alto flute (6), bass flute (6), clarinet (6), bass clarinet (6), oboe (6), English horn (6), recorder (6), horn arrangements
- Vince Denham – alto saxophone solo (5), woodwinds (5, 9), flute (6), alto flute (6), clarinet (6), bass clarinet (6), saxophones (9), horn arrangements
- Patti Austin – backing vocals (2, 4, 6), harmony vocals (7)
- Lani Groves – backing vocals (2, 4, 6)
- Gwen Guthrie – backing vocals (2, 4, 6)
- Bill Eaton – choral arrangement (8)

=== Technical ===
- Produced by Phil Ramone and Bob James
- Engineered by Phil Ramone
- Assistant engineers – Jim Boyer, Frank Jones, Andy MacDonald
- Photography – Ed Caraeff
- Design – Tom Steele
- Lettering – Martin Donald
- Management – Larry Larson and Jim Recor for Larson & Associates

== Charts ==
Chart (1977)	Peak position
Canada Top Albums/CDs (RPM)	49
US Billboard 200	27
