= Outside: From the Redwoods =

Live album by Kenny Loggins
- Released: August 10, 1993
- Recorded: 1993
- Genre: Soft rock
- Length: 74:06
- Label: Columbia
- Producer: Kenny Loggins; Terry Nelson

Kenny Loggins chronology
Leap of Faith (1991)	Outside: From the Redwoods (1993)	Return to Pooh Corner (1994)

Professional ratings
Review scores
Source	Rating
Allmusic	3/5 stars

Outside: From the Redwoods is the second live album released by American singer-songwriter Kenny Loggins. Released in August 1993, it is the recording of his June 1993 concert held "outside" at a venue located within a stand of giant redwood trees. The album features reworked versions of many of Loggins's songs, both from his solo work and his earlier work in Loggins and Messina. Michael McDonald gives a guest performance on a reworked version of their classic co-written, "What a Fool Believes", and R&B singer Shanice gives guest performances on "I Would Do Anything" and "Love Will Follow".

== Background ==
Outside: From the Redwoods is Loggins's second live album. The concert was recorded live on June 23, 1993, at the Shakespeare Santa Cruz festival in Santa Cruz, California, with the played live setlist including several songs not appearing on the eventual album, such as "Forever". The concert video broadcast on PBS features a shuffled setlist and additionally included the songs "Return to Pooh Corner", "Will of the Wild" and "Watching the River Run / Danny's Song". The videotape was nominated for an Emmy in the "Best Mixing" category for 1994.

== Track listing ==
1. "Conviction of the Heart" – (Loggins, Thomas) – 5:36
2. "What a Fool Believes" – (Loggins, McDonald) Duet with Michael McDonald – 4:12
3. "Your Mama Don't Dance" – (Loggins, Messina) – 4:13
4. "I Would Do Anything" – (Loggins, Foster) Duet with Shanice – 7:36
5. "Now and Then" – (Loggins, Bouchard) – 3:31
6. "Angry Eyes" – (Loggins, Messina) – 4:48
7. "If You Believe" – (Loggins, Wood) – 6:04
8. "Celebrate Me Home" – (Loggins, Bob James) – 8:02
9. "Love Will Follow" – (Loggins, Snow) Duet with Shanice – 5:53
10. "Leap of Faith" – (Loggins, Thomas) 6:54
11. "This Is It" (Loggins, McDonald) – 4:18
12. "Footloose" – (Loggins, Dean Pitchford) – 4:03
13. "I'm Alright" – (Loggins) 8:48

== Video Track listing ==
1. "Conviction of the Heart" – (Loggins, Thomas)
2. "What a Fool Believes" – (Loggins, McDonald) Duet with Michael McDonald
3. "Your Mama Don't Dance" – (Loggins, Messina)
4. "Return to Pooh Corner" – (Loggins)
5. "Now and Then" – (Loggins, Bouchard)
6. "Will of the Wind" – (Loggins, Will Ackerman) Duet with Will Ackerman
7. "Watching the River Run/Danny's Song" – (Messina, Loggins/Loggins)
8. "If You Believe" – (Loggins, Wood)
9. "This Is It" – (Loggins, McDonald)
10. "Love Will Follow" – (Loggins, Snow) Duet with Shanice
11. "Leap of Faith" – (Loggins, Thomas)
12. "Footloose" – (Loggins, Pitchford)
13. "I'm Alright" – (Loggins)
14. "Forever" – (Loggins, Foster, Eva Ein)

== Personnel ==
- Kenny Loggins – vocals, guitar (1–3, 5, 6, 10–13), arrangements (2)
- Steve George – acoustic piano (1, 2, 4, 7, 8, 11, 13), vocals (1, 2, 7, 8, 10, 11, 13), synth organ (9, 10), pump organ (12)
- Marc Russo – pump organ (1), saxophone (2, 4, 7–9, 13), bass drum (13)
- Steve Conn – accordion (5, 13), pump organ (11), acoustic piano (12)
- Chris Rodriguez – guitar (1–4, 6, 7, 9–13), vocals (1–3, 6, 7, 9–13), backing vocals (8)
- Sonny Landreth – slide guitar (6, 11, 13)
- Freddie Washington – bass (1–4, 7–13), vocals (1, 3, 4, 7–13)
- Herman Matthews – drums (1, 3, 4, 8)
- Alvino Bennett – drums (2, 7, 9–13)
- Steve Croes – field snare (1), surdo (1), drums (12), tom drum (13)
- Kevin Ricard – percussion (1, 2, 4, 7, 9–11, 13), djembe (1), vocals (1, 7), batás (10), congas (11), chest board (13)
- Munyungo Jackson – shekere (1), tambourine (7), shaker (9, 10), berimbau (10), percussion (13)
- Ed Mann – percussion, gong (1), surdo (1), vibraphone (2, 4, 10), percussion (10), bass drums (13)
- Howard Levy – harmonica (3, 8, 11–13), pump organ (7), mandolin (11), Jew's harp (13)
- Lynne Fiddmont – backing vocals (1, 8–10, 12, 13), shaker (2), bells (12, 13)
- Michael McDonald – vocals (2)
- Shanice – vocals (4, 9)
- Robbie Nevil – arrangements (2)
- C.J. Vanston – arrangements (11)

Santa Cruz Missionary Baptist Choir on "If You Believe"

- Rev. Malcolm Barth
- Janette Crutch
- Regina Hatfield
- Barbara Riley
- Rev. Larry Riley
- Don Williams
- Nancy Williams

Additional choir on "If You Believe"

- Lynne Fiddmont
- Sonny Landreth
- Ed Mann
- Herman Matthews
- Julia Waters
- Luther Waters
- Maxine Waters
- Oren Waters

== Production ==
- Bobby Colomby – A&R direction
- Kenny Loggins – producer
- Terry Nelson – producer, live recording, mixing (1, 2, 4, 7, 9, 11–13)
- Steve Croes – associate producer
- Bruce Botnick – mixing (3, 5, 6, 8, 10)
- Peter Kelsey – mixing (3, 5, 6, 8, 10)
- Charlie Bouis – assistant engineer
- Guy Charbonneau – assistant engineer
- David Gallo – assistant engineer
- Bert Battaglia – mix assistant
- Rail Rogut – mix assistant
- John Schmit – mix assistant
- Rich Veltrop – mix assistant
- Joe Gastwirt – mastering at Oceanview Digital Mastering (Los Angeles, California)
- Colleen Donahue-Reynolds – production coordination
- Jay Blakesberg – photography
- Dennis Keeley – photography (of Michael McDonald)
- A. West – art direction, 3-D art
- DZN – design
- Denzyl Feigelson – management

Live crew

- Denny Jones – tour coordinator
- Karen Estes – production assistant
- Don Risdon – production assistant
- Bea Oliver – stage manager
- Jeff Cowan – live sound engineer
- Jim Moran – monitor engineer
- Crosby Loggins – stage technician
- Dave Barrera – keyboard technician, assistant stage manager
- Norik Renson – guitar technician
- Matt Luneau – drum technician
- Bryan Allinsmith – percussion technician

== Charts ==
Year	Album details	Peak positions	Certifications (sales threshold)
Year	Album details	US	Certifications (sales threshold)
1993	Outside: From the Redwoods: Second live album; Release date: August 10, 1993; Label: Columbia Records	60	US: Gold

=== Television ===
Year	Nominee / work	Award	Result
1994	Kenny Loggins: Outside From The Redwoods (PBS): Bruce Botnick, Sound Mixer; Peter R. Kelsey, Sound Mixer; Terry Nelson, Sound Mixer	Emmy: Outstanding Individual Achievement in Sound Mixing; For a Variety or Music Series or a Special	Nominated
