= Keep the Fire (song) =

Single by Kenny Loggins

from the album Keep the Fire
- B-side: "Now and Then"
- Released: 1980
- Genre: Soft rock
- Length: 3:45 (7" version); 4:34 (album version)
- Label: Columbia
- Songwriters: Kenny Loggins; Eva Ein Loggins
- Producer: Tom Dowd

Kenny Loggins singles chronology
"This Is It" (1979)	"Keep the Fire" (1980)	"I'm Alright" (1980)

Music video
- "Keep the Fire" on YouTube

"Keep The Fire" is a song by American artist Kenny Loggins. It was released in 1980 as the second and final single from the album of the same name. This track reached number 36 in the Billboard Hot 100 chart in April that year. The song was written by Kenny Loggins and Eva Ein Loggins.

== Chart positions ==
Chart (1980)	Peak position
Canada Top Singles (RPM)	52
U.S. Billboard Hot 100	36
U.S. Billboard Adult Contemporary	40
