= For the First Time (Kenny Loggins song) =

Single by Kenny Loggins

from the album One Fine Day: Music from the Motion Picture
- Released: 1996
- Genre: Soft rock
- Length: 4:26
- Label: Columbia
- Songwriters: James Newton Howard; Jud J. Friedman; Allan Dennis Rich
- Producer: Peter Asher

Kenny Loggins singles chronology
"Return to Pooh Corner" (1994)	"For the First Time" (1996)	"I Am Not Hiding" (1997)

Music video
- "For the First Time" on YouTube

"For the First Time" is a 1996 song performed by Kenny Loggins from the 1996 film One Fine Day starring Michelle Pfeiffer and George Clooney with music and lyrics by James Newton Howard, Jud J. Friedman, and Allan Dennis Rich and produced by Peter Asher. The song was included in the soundtrack of the film and is Loggins' one and only number one hit on the Adult Contemporary chart, remaining on the top spot for two weeks. It also peaked at number sixty on the Billboard Hot 100 Airplay chart. The song did not make the Billboard Hot 100 chart as it was not made available as a commercial single, which at that time made it ineligible to chart on the Hot 100. "For the First Time" was nominated for the Academy Award for Best Original Song.

"For the First Time" was first released by Rod Stewart on his album If We Fall in Love Tonight, a month prior to the release of Loggins' version.

== Music video ==
The song's accompanying music video shows Loggins singing the song in a dimly-lit giant manor house and an empty theater on a rainy night, interspliced with scenes from the movie. It ends with Loggins walking down a street in heavy rain. This is the first Kenny Loggins video to feature the singer without his trademark facial hair as he shaved it in 1996 prior to filming.

== Other versions ==
In 2008, KC Concepcion sang her version of the song from the 2008 film of the same title released by Star Cinema with her co-star Richard Gutierrez. In 1999, Steve Wariner recorded the song for his album Two Teardrops.

== Charts ==
Chart performance for "For the First Time"
Chart (1997)	Peak position
Australia (ARIA)	81
US Adult Contemporary (Billboard)	1
