= Mike Hamilton (guitarist) =

American singer-songwriter, guitarist and session musician

Mike Hamilton (sometimes listed as Michael Hamilton) is an American guitarist, singer-songwriter and session musician.

== Career ==
Hamilton has performed, toured and/or recorded with Bette Midler, Sting, Jay Ferguson, Jennifer Warnes, Peter Kater, Jack Tempchin, Max Bennett, Pure Prairie League, Kenny Loggins and many other music artists. Some of his original songs and compositions can be found on the following album/CDs and cassettes: Songs And Sounds The Same, Mike Hamilton - Mementos 1971 - 1987, Pure Prairie League - Anthology, Mike Hamilton - Wind Of The East, Peter Kater - Best Of Laguna Vol.1, Coastal Soul Music. His guitar playing and singing can be heard and seen on the VHS, Laser Disc and DVD Release of Alive, Kenny Loggins and the VHS Release of Art Or Bust, Bette Midler.

== Discography ==
- 1978: Nightwatch, Kenny Loggins
- 1979: Keep the Fire, Kenny Loggins
- 1980: Caddyshack: Music from the Motion Picture Soundtrack, Kenny Loggins
- 1980: Kenny Loggins Alive, Kenny Loggins
- 1982: White Noise, Jay Ferguson
- 1982: High Adventure, Kenny Loggins
- 1983: Twilight Zone - The Movie, Jerry Goldsmith, Jennifer Warnes
- 1987: Songs and Sounds The Same, Mike Hamilton
- 1987: Mementos 1971 - 1987, Pure Prairie League
- 1995: Soundtrack from The IMAX Film "The Living Sea", Sting and Steve Wood
- 1998: Soundtrack from the IMAX Film Experience "EVEREST", George Harrison, Steve Wood, and Daniel May
- 1999: Anthology, Mike Hamilton
- 2000: Soundtrack From The IMAX Theatre Film "Dolphins", Sting and Steve Wood
- 2002: Sometimes I Dream, Mario Frangoulis
- 2007: Faces Of The Sun, Peter Kater
- 2008: Wind Of The East, Peter Kater
- 2008: "Liv The Dig", Mike Hamilton
- 2012: "Impianoprov In Folktrancea ", Mike Hamilton
