= Back to Avalon =

Studio album by Kenny Loggins
- Released: August 2, 1988
- Recorded: 1986–1988
- Studios: Various: Can-Am Recorders (Tarzana); Image Recording (Los Angeles); Bill Schnee Studios (North Hollywood); Digital Innovations (Los Angeles); Encore Studios (Burbank); The Village Recorder (Los Angeles); Rumbo Recorders (Canoga Park); Sound Castle Recorders (Los Angeles); Gary Chang Music Co. (Los Angeles); The Enterprise (Burbank); Sound Design (Santa Barbara); Record Plant (Los Angeles); Chartmaker (Malibu); Gateway Studios (Carpinteria); Johnny Yuma Recording (Burbank); The Plant Studios (Sausalito); Monday to Sunday (Burbank); Garden Rake (Sherman Oaks); Studio City Sound (Studio City); Gigot's Ears (Studio City); Arlyn Studios (Austin); Ground Control Studios (Burbank)
- Genre: Soft rock
- Length: 47:27
- Label: Columbia
- Producers: Dennis Lambert; Peter Wolf; Richie Zito; Richard Page; Patrick Leonard; Giorgio Moroder

Kenny Loggins chronology
Vox Humana (1985)	Back to Avalon (1988)	Leap of Faith (1991)

Professional ratings
Review scores
Source	Rating
Allmusic	3/5 stars
Rolling Stone	2/5 stars

Back to Avalon is the sixth studio album by American singer-songwriter Kenny Loggins. Released on August 2, 1988, it yielded the hit singles "Nobody's Fool (Theme from Caddyshack II)" (a No. 8 hit in the U.S.), "I'm Gonna Miss You", "Tell Her", and "Meet Me Half Way" (a No. 11 hit in the U.S.), the last of which is a ballad which had already become a top 40 hit the previous year through the film Over the Top. To date, it is the only studio album by Loggins to feature songs from motion picture soundtracks.

== Track listing ==
No.	Title	Writer(s)	Length
1.	"Nobody's Fool" (Theme from Caddyshack II)	Kenny Loggins; Michael Towers	4:18
2.	"I'm Gonna Miss You"	Pam Reswick; Steve Werfel; Jeff Pescetto	4:23
3.	"Tell Her"	Bert Russell	3:36
4.	"One Woman"	Loggins; Richard Page; John Lang	4:07
5.	"Back to Avalon"	Loggins; Peter Wolf; Nathan East	5:40
6.	"She's Dangerous"	Loggins; Michael McDonald	5:17
7.	"True Confessions"	Martin Briley; Richard Feldman	3:46
8.	"Hope for the Runaway"	Loggins; Patrick Leonard	4:25
9.	"Isabella's Eyes"	Loggins; Keith Diamond	4:46
10.	"Blue on Blue"	Loggins; Towers; Robert Irving	3:53
11.	"Meet Me Half Way"	Giorgio Moroder; Tom Whitlock	3:39
Total length:			47:27

== Personnel ==
=== Musicians ===
- Kenny Loggins – lead vocals, backing vocals (1, 2, 5, 6, 8), guitars (1, 6), acoustic guitar (3)
- Peter Wolf – all instruments (2, 5, 7), keyboards (9), bass (9), drums (9), percussion (9), arrangements (2, 5, 7, 9)
- Dann Huff – guitars (1, 2, 5–9, 11)
- Richie Zito – guitars (3, 11)
- Steve Farris – guitars (4)
- Pete McRae – guitars (7)
- David Williams – guitars (8)
- Tim Pierce – guitars (10)
- Arthur Barrow – bass (3), synthesizers (3)
- John Pierce – bass (10)
- Claude Gaudette – keyboards (1), programming (1), arrangements (1)
- Gary Chang – Synclavier (3), synthesizer arrangements (3)
- Steve George – keyboards (4)
- Patrick Leonard – keyboards (6, 8), programming (6)
- Michael McDonald – keyboards (6), lead and backing vocals (6)
- Jai Winding – acoustic piano (8)
- Kim Bullard – keyboards (10), programming (10)
- Brian Banks – synthesizers (11)
- Anthony Marinelli – synthesizers (11)
- Giorgio Moroder – synthesizers (11)
- Terry Wilson – synthesizers (11)
- Mickey Curry – drums (3)
- Pat Mastelotto – drums (4)
- John Robinson – drums (6)
- Jonathan Moffett – drums (8)
- Mike Baird – drums (10)
- Luis Conte – percussion (8)
- Dan Higgins – tenor saxophone (9)
- Larry Williams – tenor saxophone (9)
- Gary Grant – trumpet (9)
- Jerry Hey – trumpet (9), horn arrangements (9)
- Jeff Pescetto – backing vocals (1, 2)
- Donny Baldwin – backing vocals (2, 7)
- Mickey Thomas – backing vocals (2, 7)
- Siedah Garrett – additional vocals (3), backing vocals (4)
- Táta Vega – additional vocals (3)
- Carolyn Dennis – backing vocals (4)
- Richard Page – backing vocals (4)
- Ina Wolf – backing vocals (5, 9)
- Grace Slick – backing vocals (7)
- Tampa Lann – backing vocals (8)
- Maxi Anderson – backing vocals (9)
- Merry Clayton – backing vocals (9)
- Jim Gilstrap – backing vocals (9)
- Oren Waters – backing vocals (9)

=== Technical ===
- Executive producer – Michael Dilbeck
- Produced by Dennis Lambert (1), Peter Wolf (2, 5, 7, 9), Richie Zito (3, 10), Richard Page (4), Patrick Leonard (6, 8), and Giorgio Moroder (11)
- Engineered by David Bianco and Doug Rider (1); Paul Ericksen (2, 5), Phil Kaffel (3, 10), Terry Nelson (4, 9), Tony Peluso (4), Mick Guzauski (6), Brian Malouf (6, 7, 9), lan Eales (8), Brian Reeves (11)
- Mixed by Brian Malouf (1–10) and Brian Reeves (11)
- Mastered by Doug Sax at The Mastering Lab (Hollywood, CA)
- Production coordinators – Arlene J. Matza and Carol Thompson
- Creative consultant – Michael Dilbeck
- Cover design – Margo Chase
- Art direction – John Coulter
- Photography – Victoria Pearson
- Management – Larry Larson
