= One Fine Day (1996 film) =

1996 film by Michael Hoffman

- Theatrical release poster
- Directed by: Michael Hoffman
- Written by: Terrel Seltzer; Ellen Simon
- Produced by: Lynda Obst
- Starring: Michelle Pfeiffer; George Clooney; Mae Whitman; Charles Durning
- Cinematography: Oliver Stapleton
- Edited by: Garth Craven
- Music by: James Newton Howard
- Production companies: Lynda Obst Productions; Via Rosa Productions
- Distributed by: 20th Century Fox
- Release date: December 22, 1996
- Running time: 108 minutes
- Country: United States
- Language: English
- Budget: US$46.5 million
- Box office: US$97.5 million

One Fine Day is a 1996 American romantic comedy-drama film directed by Michael Hoffman, starring Michelle Pfeiffer and George Clooney. Alex D. Linz and Mae Whitman play their children. The title comes from the 1963 song "One Fine Day" by Carole King, which is heard in the film.

Pfeiffer served as an executive producer for the film, which was produced in association with her company Via Rosa Productions.

One Fine Day was released by 20th Century Fox on December 20, 1996. The film received mixed reviews from critics and grossed $97.5 million at the box office. The film was nominated for an Academy Award for Best Original Song ("For the First Time").

== Plot ==
Sammy is the son of Melanie Parker, an architect, and Maggie is the daughter of Jack Taylor, a New York Daily News reporter who like Melanie is recently divorced. They are dropped off at school a moment too late to go on a school field trip, a Circle Line boat cruise. Melanie and Jack realize that their hectic schedules now include supervising their children. Worse, they accidentally switched cell phones while sharing a cab, meaning they must spend the morning fielding and relaying each other's calls.

Melanie is preparing an architectural design presentation for an important client while Jack is sourcing a scoop on the mayor's mob connections. Sammy's toy cars cause havoc at Melanie's office, and she trips and breaks her architectural model. In frustration, she takes him to a day care center where she coincidentally encounters Jack trying to convince Maggie to behave. They create super hero costumes for the children with his imagination and her resourcefulness. She takes her model to a shop for repairs and panics when Sammy phones about another child at the day care having a psychedelic drug. She phones Jack and begs him to pick up the children. He agrees, on the condition she take them both at 3:15 while he chases down a potential news source.

Maggie goes missing from a store into a crowded midtown sidewalk. Melanie files a missing child report, breaking down at the police steation, then attends a mayoral press conference to find Jack who's been notified by police that Maggie has been found. He arrives just in time to confront the mayor with his scoop about corruption. Melanie and Jack put aside their mutual antagonism to take the children by taxi to a soccer game. Melanie insists she can make her presentation to the new clients without making them late for the game. She begins her pitch over drinks at the 21 Club lounge, but seeing Sammy in high spirits convinces her she cares more about him than her job. Expecting to be fired for her hasty departure, the clients are instead impressed by how she prioritizes her family. Melanie meets her musician ex-husband, Eddie, at the game and learns he can't take Sammy in the summer as he'll be touring as a drummer with Bruce Springsteen.

Jack finds a reason to visit Melanie's apartment by buying Maggie goldfish to replace the ones that were eaten earlier in the day by a cat. Sammy and Maggie watch The Wizard of Oz while Melanie and Jack share a first kiss, then fall asleep together on the sofa with the children happily watching.

== Cast ==
- Michelle Pfeiffer as Melanie Parker
- George Clooney as Jack Taylor
- Mae Whitman as Maggie Taylor
- Alex D. Linz as Sammy Parker
- Jon Robin Baitz as Yates Jr.
- Ellen Greene as Elaine Lieberman
- Joe Grifasi as Manny Feldstein
- Pete Hamill as Frank Burroughs
- Anna Maria Horsford as Evelyn
- Gregory Jbara as Freddy
- Sheila Kelley as Kristen
- Barry Kivel as Yates Sr.
- Robert Klein as Dr. Martin
- George Martin as Smith Leland
- Michael Massee as Eddie
- Amanda Peet as Celia
- Bitty Schram as Marla
- Holland Taylor as Rita
- Rachel York as Liza
- Charles Durning as Lew
- Marianne Muellerleile as Ruta
- Sid Armus as Mayor Aikens
- Michael Badalucco as Officer Bonomo

== Production ==
Clooney's character did not exist in the script's original draft. Producer Lynda Obst explained the change: "We were being incredibly sexist. There are plenty of divorced, single working fathers going through the exact same thing." The studios initially wanted Kevin Costner or Tom Cruise to portray Jack Taylor, but they passed and Clooney ultimately received the part. The film was shot in 44 Manhattan locations.

== Soundtrack ==
One Fine Day: Music from the Motion Picture

Soundtrack album by various artists
- Released: December 10, 1996
- Length: 52:22
- Label: Columbia

Professional ratings
Review scores
Source	Rating
AllMusic	link

One Fine Day: Music from the Motion Picture is the soundtrack album to the film. It was released on December 10, 1996, by Columbia Records. The album peaked at number 57 on Billboard 200 in 1997.

=== Track listing ===
No.	Title	Writer(s)	Artist	Length
1.	"One Fine Day"	Carole King; Gerry Goffin	Natalie Merchant	2:45
2.	"The Boy from New York City"	George Davis; John T. Taylor	The Ad Libs	3:01
3.	"For the First Time"	James Newton Howard; Jud J. Friedman; Allan Rich	Kenny Loggins	4:30
4.	"Mama Said"	Luther Dixon; Willie Denson	The Shirelles	2:09
5.	"Someone Like You"	Van Morrison	Shawn Colvin	4:11
6.	"Love's Funny That Way"	Tina Arena; Dean McTaggart; David Tyson	Tina Arena	4:37
7.	"Have I Told You Lately"	Morrison	Van Morrison	4:20
8.	"The Glory of Love"	William Hill	Keb' Mo'	2:58
9.	"What a Diff'rence a Day Made"	María Mendez Grever; Stanley Adams	Tony Bennett	2:28
10.	"Isn't It Romantic?"	Richard Rodgers; Lorenz Hart	Ella Fitzgerald	3:02
11.	"This Guy's in Love with You"	Burt Bacharach; Hal David	Harry Connick Jr.	3:48
12.	"Just like You"	Kevin Moore; John Lewis Parker	Keb' Mo'	3:28
13.	"One Fine Day"	King; Goffin	The Chiffons	2:10
14.	"Suite from One Fine Day"	Howard	James Newton Howard	8:55
Total length:				52:22

=== Certifications ===
Region	Certification	Certified units/sales
United States (RIAA)	Gold	500,000^{^}
^{^} Shipments figures based on certification alone.

== Reception ==
=== Box office ===
One Fine Day earned a total of $6.2 million during its opening weekend, ranking in fifth place at the box office behind Beavis and Butt-Head Do America, Jerry Maguire, 101 Dalmatians and Scream.

=== Critical response ===
On the review aggregator website Rotten Tomatoes, the film holds an approval rating of 56% based on 36 reviews. The website's critics consensus reads, "With a throwback 1930s vibe, this screwball romantic comedy is perfect for One Fine Day of folding laundry." Metacritic, which uses a weighted average, assigned the film a score of 56 out of 100, based on 21 critics, indicating "mixed or average" reviews. It was considered a commercial disappointment by Twentieth Century Fox.

Janet Maslin of The New York Times wrote, "A 50's romp with a few glaring 90's touches (dueling cellular phones, frazzled single parents), One Fine Day makes for sunny, pleasant fluff. Both stars are enjoyably breezy, and there's enough chemistry to deflect attention from the story's endless contrivances... he's [Clooney] such a natural as a movie star that he hardly needs false flattery. Ms Pfeiffer, meanwhile, shows a flair for physical comedy."

Roger Ebert of the Chicago Sun-Times wrote, "'Cinema is the history of boys photographing girls.' Or so Jean-Luc Godard is claimed to have said. I thought of his words while watching One Fine Day, an uninspired formula movie with another fine performance by Michelle Pfeiffer. She does everything in this movie that a much better movie would have required from her, but the screenplay lets her down... Pfeiffer looks, acts and sounds wonderful throughout all of this, and George Clooney is perfectly serviceable as a romantic lead, sort of a Mel Gibson lite. I liked them. I wanted them to get together. I wanted them to live happily ever after. The sooner the better."

Rita Kempley of The Washington Post wrote, "Director Michael Hoffman, whose idiosyncratic portfolio includes the period comedy Restoration and the spoof Soapdish, sets a mellow pace and alternates old-fashioned split screen with crosscutting to enliven the many phone scenes. If the stars don't click, of course, nothing else matters. Happily, Pfeiffer and Clooney, now officially a movie star, not only click, they send off sparks."

Kenneth Turan of the Los Angeles Times wrote, "One Fine Day is fortunate in its casting. Not only does it have Michelle Pfeiffer, whose gift for this kind of business was visible as far back as Married to the Mob and The Fabulous Baker Boys, but it marks the emergence of George Clooney as a major romantic star... Still, despite feeling like its moments have been micro-managed for maximum audience response, One Fine Day often passes for a pleasant diversion. But with actors so suited to each other, it's too bad the film didn't give them more original material to work with."

Edward Guthmann of the San Francisco Chronicle wrote, "We've seen it before, but Pfeiffer and Clooney do everything in their power to make it seem fresh and delightful. That's ultimately not enough, and even though the stars have some chemistry and Pfeiffer delivers her usual spotless performance, One Fine Day never manages to be more than a harmless, forgettable time-filler."

Rob Nelson of the Boston Phoenix wrote, "Privilege and coincidence have always been central to screwball comedy, but the speed of crosstown travel here rivals Die Hard 3 for plausibility. And it's these convenient shortcuts that waylay the film from examining the condition it purports to critique: that is, the '90s compulsion to drive at full throttle."

=== Accolades ===
Year	Award	Category	Nominee(s)	Result	Ref.
1997	Academy Awards	Best Original Song	"For the First Time"; Music and Lyrics by James Newton Howard, Jud J. Friedman, and Allan Dennis Rich	Nominated	
1997	Blockbuster Entertainment Awards	Favorite Actress – Comedy/Romance	Michelle Pfeiffer	Won	
1997	Golden Globe Awards	Best Original Song	"For the First Time"; Music and Lyrics by James Newton Howard, Jud J. Friedman, and Allan Dennis Rich	Nominated	
1997	Nickelodeon Kids' Choice Awards	Favorite Movie Actress	Michelle Pfeiffer	Nominated	
1997	Young Artist Awards	Best Family Feature Film – Musical or Comedy		Won	
1997	Young Artist Awards	Best Performance in a Feature Film: Actor Age Ten or Under	Alex D. Linz	Nominated	
1997	Young Artist Awards	Best Performance in a Feature Film: Actress Age Ten or Under	Mae Whitman	Won	
1997	YoungStar Awards	Best Young Actor in a Comedy Film	Alex D. Linz	Won	
1997	YoungStar Awards	Best Young Actress in a Comedy Film	Mae Whitman	Nominated	
1998	Grammy Awards	Best Song Written Specifically for a Motion Picture or for Television	"For the First Time"; James Newton Howard, Jud J. Friedman, and Allan Dennis Rich (songwriters)	Nominated	
