= Leap of Faith (Kenny Loggins album) =

Studio album by Kenny Loggins
- Released: September 10, 1991
- Recorded: 1991
- Studios: Various: Lahaina Sound (Lahaina); Sound Design (Santa Barbara); Gateway (Carpinteria); The Enterprise (Burbank); Westlake Audio (Los Angeles); Capitol Studio A (Hollywood); Red Zone (Burbank); Ocean Way (Hollywood); Soundcastle (Hollywood); Studio 55 (Los Angeles); Sunset Sound (Hollywood)
- Genre: Soft rock
- Length: 65:51
- Label: Columbia
- Producers: Kenny Loggins; David Kershenbaum; Terry Nelson

Kenny Loggins chronology
Back to Avalon (1988)	Leap of Faith (1991)	Outside: From the Redwoods (1993)

Professional ratings
Review scores
Source	Rating
Allmusic	2/5 stars

Leap of Faith is the seventh studio album by American singer-songwriter Kenny Loggins. The album was released on September 10, 1991, by Columbia Records. It was the first album Loggins released after a divorce, and is notably longer than his previous solo albums. Singles from the album included "The Real Thing," "If You Believe," "Now or Never," and "Conviction of the Heart," the latter of which was later dubbed "the unofficial anthem of the environmental movement" by Vice President Al Gore. "I Would Do Anything" features Sheryl Crow who can also be heard in the title song along with Smokey Robinson.

== Track listing ==
All tracks are written by Kenny Loggins, with additional writers noted.

No.	Title	Writer(s)	Length
1.	"Will of the Wind"	Will Ackerman	2:00
2.	"Leap of Faith"	Guy Thomas	7:23
3.	"The Real Thing"	David Foster	5:39
4.	"Conviction of the Heart"	Thomas	6:52
5.	"If You Believe"	Steve Wood	6:32
6.	"I Would Do Anything" (duet with Sheryl Crow)	Foster	6:34
7.	"Sweet Reunion"	Wood	5:46
8.	"Now or Never"	Thomas	5:45
9.	"My Father's House"	Ackerman	5:27
10.	"Cody's Song"		4:39
11.	"Will of the Wind (Reprise)"	Ackerman	1:14
12.	"Too Early for the Sun"	John Barnes	8:06
Total length:			65:51

== Personnel ==
=== Musicians ===
- Kenny Loggins – lead vocals, backing vocals, acoustic guitar (2, 4), a cappella choir (7), acoustic classical guitar (10), arrangements (8, 12)
- Will Ackerman – acoustic guitar (1, 9)
- Hiram Bullock – acoustic guitar (2), voice solo (2)
- James Harrah – electric guitar (2)
- Guy Thomas – acoustic guitar (2, 10), electric guitar (4), guitar solo (6), classical guitar (8)
- Paul Jackson Jr. – acoustic guitar (3), electric guitar (5–7), classical guitar (7)
- Dean Parks – acoustic guitar (3, 12), classical guitar (6)
- David Lindley – slide guitar (4, 5)
- Ottmar Liebert – classical guitar fade (6)
- Tim Pierce – electric guitar (8)
- Randy Jackson – bass (2)
- Freddie Washington – fretless bass (3), bass (4, 5, 7)
- Nathan East – upright bass (6)
- Keith Jones – fretless bass (8)
- Dave "Squatty" Barrera – keyboard programming
- Steve Wood – synthesizers (2, 3, 7), keyboards (4), organ (5)
- David Foster – piano (3)
- Richard Tee – piano (5)
- John Barnes – Synclavier (6, 8, 12), piano (7), strings (7), synthesizers (12), vocal arrangements (5), arrangements (8, 12)
- Greg Phillinganes – keyboards (6), synth voices (7)
- Michael Baird – drums (3), field snare (4)
- Tris Imboden – drums (4)
- Herman Matthews – drums (5), voice drums (7)
- John Robinson – drums (5)
- Ricky Lawson – cymbals (6), tom tom (6)
- Bill Summers – percussion (2, 4, 5, 7), tambura (5)
- Munyungo Jackson – percussion (2, 4, 5, 7, 12), tambura (5)
- Paulinho da Costa – percussion (6)
- Luis Conte – percussion (8)
- Kazu Matsui – shakuhachi (6, 11)
- Marc Russo – saxophone solo (7), saxophone (10)
- Enrique Cruz – pan flute (9)
- Everette Harp – alto saxophone (12)
- Angeles String Quartet
  - Kathleen Lenski – violin (10)
  - Roger Wilkie – violin (10)
  - Brian Denbow – viola (10)
  - Stephen Erdody – cello (10)
- Michael Marksman – string contractor (10)
- Kate Price – backing vocals (1, 4, 8, 9)
- Sheryl Crow – backing vocals (2, 5), intro choir (5), vocals (6)
- Smokey Robinson – cameo vocal (2)
- Terry Nelson – backing vocals (4)
- Michael McDonald – backing vocals (8)
- Amy Holland McDonald – backing vocals (8)
- Maureen McDonald Ferguson – backing vocals (8)
- Mavis Staples – cameo vocal (12)
- Morgan Ames – backing vocals (12)
- Darlene Koldenhoven – backing vocals (12)
- Myrna Matthews – backing vocals (12)
- Carmen Twillie – backing vocals (12)
- Adult Choir – choir (4)
- Arnold McCuller – choir director (4)
- Colors of Love – children's choir (4, 5)
- Nyna Shannon Anderson – children's choir director (4, 5)
- Siedah Garrett – intro choir (5), backing vocals (5)
- Ruth Pointer – intro choir (5), backing vocals (5)
- Katrina Adams – vocal soloist (5)
- Laurie Rubin – vocal soloist (5)
- Thomas Patterson – vocal soloist (5)
- The McDonald Family Choir – choir (8)
- Steve Dubin – drum arrangements (3)
- Paul Buckmaster – string arrangements (3, 10, 12)

=== Technical ===
- Produced by Kenny Loggins, David Kershenbaum (1, 2, 9, 11), and Terry Nelson (3–8, 10, 12)
- Engeineered by Terry Nelson
- Mixed by Brian Malouf at The Enterprise (Burbank, CA)
- Assistant engineers – Neal Avron, Tracy Chisholm, Juan Garza, Steve Harrison, Steve Holroyd, Anders Johansson, Leslie Jones, Julie Last, Scott Lovelis, Pat McDougal, Jack Roubin, David Russell, Andrew Scheps, and John Whynot
- Mastered by Doug Sax at The Mastering Lab (Hollywood, CA)
- Production coordinators – Arlene Marza and Colleen Reynolds
- Art direction – Nancy Donald
- Photography – Ann Elliott Cutting
- Design – Tracy Veal
- Management – Shep Gordon and Denzyl Feigelson (Alive Enterprises)
