= Caddyshack (soundtrack) =

Caddyshack: Music from the Motion Picture Soundtrack

Soundtrack album by Various artists
- Released: 1980
- Recorded: 1979
- Length: 31:20
- Labels: Columbia; La-La Land (reissue)
- Producers: Kenny Loggins; Bruce Botnick; Johnny Mandel; Tom Dowd; Geoffrey Workman; Kevin Elson; Roy Thomas Baker

Kenny Loggins chronology
Keep the Fire (1979)	Caddyshack: Music from the Motion Picture Soundtrack (1980)	Kenny Loggins Alive (1980)

Johnny Mandel chronology
Freaky Friday (1976)	Caddyshack: Music from the Motion Picture Soundtrack (1980)	Too Close for Comfort (1980)

Singles from Caddyshack (soundtrack)
- 1. "I'm Alright (Theme from Caddyshack)" Released: July 7, 1980

Caddyshack: Music from the Motion Picture Soundtrack is a 1980 soundtrack to the film of the same name. It includes original songs from Kenny Loggins and a film score by Johnny Mandel. It also includes appearances by Journey, Paul Collins & the Beat, and Hilly Michaels. The soundtrack was a moderate success on the charts, peaking at No. 78 on the Billboard 200.

In 2010, La-La Land Records reissued the soundtrack on CD.

== Track listing ==
No.	Title	Writer(s)	Producer(s)	Length
1.	"I'm Alright (Theme from Caddyshack)" (Kenny Loggins)	Kenny Loggins	Kenny Loggins; Bruce Botnick	3:46
2.	"Lead the Way" (Loggins)	Loggins; Eva Ein Loggins	Loggins; Botnick	4:33
3.	"Make the Move" (Loggins)	Loggins	Loggins; Botnick	3:45
4.	"Mr. Night" (Loggins)	Loggins; Richard Stekol	Tom Dowd	3:22
5.	"Any Way You Want It" (Journey)	Steve Perry; Neal Schon	Geoffrey Workman; Kevin Elson	3:09
6.	"There She Goes" (The Beat)	Paul Collins	Botnick	2:41
7.	"Divine Intervention" (Johnny Mandel)	Johnny Mandel	Johnny Mandel	1:47
8.	"Marina" (Mandel)	Mandel	Mandel	3:23
9.	"Something On Your Mind" (Hilly Michaels)	Hilly Michaels; Morgan Walker	Roy Thomas Baker	2:43
10.	"The Big Bang" (Mandel)	Mandel	Mandel	2:03

== Other ==
Songs included in the film, but not on the soundtrack are as follows:

1. "Summertime Blues" - Eddie Cochran
2. "Boogie Wonderland" - Earth Wind & Fire ft. The Emotions
3. "Waltz of the Flowers" - Pyotr Tchaikovsky
4. "The Ballad of the Green Berets" - Barry Sadler
5. "The Gold Diggers' Song (We're in the Money)" - Harry Warren
6. "Theme From 'Jaws'"- John Williams
7. "The Burning Bush" - Elmer Bernstein
8. "Tchaikovsky's 1812 Overture"- Henry Adolph Harmonica Slavonica

== Sources ==
1. https://www.allmusic.com/album/caddyshack-mw0000318909
2. https://www.imdb.com/title/tt0080487/soundtrack
3. Caddyshack: Music from the Motion Picture Soundtrack (booklet). Columbia. 1980.
