= Keep the Fire =

Studio album by Kenny Loggins
- Released: September 26, 1979
- Recorded: 1979
- Studios: Filmways/Wally Heider (Hollywood); Santa Barbara Sound (Santa Barbara); Criteria (Miami)
- Genre: Pop rock
- Length: 40:48
- Label: Columbia
- Producer: Tom Dowd

Kenny Loggins chronology
Nightwatch (1978)	Keep the Fire (1979)	Caddyshack: Music from the Motion Picture Soundtrack (1980)

Keep the Fire is the third studio album by American singer-songwriter Kenny Loggins, released on September 26, 1979. It is perhaps best known for the hit single "This Is It". The song was co-written by Michael McDonald, who also performed on the track. Michael Jackson sings backup vocals on the track "Who's Right, Who's Wrong".

== Reception ==
Professional ratings
Review scores
Source	Rating
AllMusic	3.5/5 stars
Christgau's Record Guide	C+
MusicHound Rock: The Essential Album Guide	2.5/5 stars
Record Collector	1/5 stars
Record Mirror	3.5/5 stars

Rolling Stone described the album as "the new sound of Southern California: a sophisticated, diffuse, jazz-inflected pop rock performed by an augmented rock band in which guitar and keyboards share equal prominence" and "churning romantic atmosphere constructed around a matinee idol's voice". The Globe and Mail noted that, "occasionally, he stumbles into some of the good-time hokey rockin' fun that made such Loggins and Messina numbers as 'Your Mama Don't Dance' so nauseating."

=== Film ===
The award-winning short film "Keep the Fire", by Jake Rice, is a fictionalized "Behind the Album Cover" story.

== Track listing ==
All tracks are written by Kenny Loggins, with additional writers noted.

Side one
No.	Title	Writer(s)	Length
1.	"Love Has Come of Age"		3:51
2.	"Mr. Night"	Richard Stekol	3:20
3.	"This Is It"	Michael McDonald	3:57
4.	"Junkanoo Holiday (Fallin'-Flyin')"		4:30
5.	"Now and Then"	Jeff Bouchard	3:52

Side two
No.	Title	Writer(s)	Length
1.	"Who's Right, Who's Wrong"	Richard Page	5:38
2.	"Keep the Fire"	Eva Ein	4:34
3.	"Give It Half a Chance"	Stephen Bishop	4:57
4.	"Will It Last"	Ein	5:50

== Personnel ==
Musicians

- Kenny Loggins – lead vocals, backing vocals, guitars, Roland guitar synthesizer, Sennheiser vocoder (7)
- Mike Hamilton – guitars, backing vocals, harmony vocals (3, 8)
- George Hawkins – bass, backing vocals, harmony vocals (2, 3, 8)
- Brian Mann – keyboards, Yamaha CS-80, Prophet-5, Minimoog, accordion solo (5), horn arrangements (5), string arrangements (5)
- Tris Imboden – drums, percussion
- Jon Clarke – saxophone, oboe, English horn, clarinet, flute, recorder, tambourine, horn arrangements (2, 7)
- Vince Denham – saxophone, flute, cabasa

Additional musicians

- Michael McDonald – acoustic piano (3), harmony vocals (3)
- Fred Tackett – acoustic guitar (8, 9)
- Milt Holland – percussion (1, 2, 4–9)
- Paulinho da Costa – percussion (3)
- Michael Brecker – tenor saxophone solo (6)
- Richard Stekol – harmony vocals (2)
- Michael Jackson – harmony vocals (6)
- Richard Page – harmony vocals (6)
- Jeff Bouchard – harmony vocals (8)
- Albhy Galuten – string arrangements (2, 8)

Technical

- Produced by Tom Dowd
- Engineered by Steve Gursky and Michael Carnavale
- Second mixing engineer – Samii Taylor
- Mastered by Mike Fuller at Criteria Studios (Miami, Florida)
- Guitar synthesizer technician – Wayne Williams
- ARP synthesizer programming – Max Gronenthal
- Cover concept – Scott Thom and Kenny Loggins
- Cover painting – Scott Thom
- Cover photography – Ed Caraeff Studios
- Sleeve photography – Eva Ein
- Visual coordination – Tony Lane

== Charts ==
=== Weekly charts ===
Chart (1979–80)	Peak position
Australia (Kent Music Report)	95
Canada Top Albums/CDs (RPM)	36
US Billboard 200	16

=== Year-end charts ===
Chart (1980)	Position
US Billboard 200	16
