= This Is It (Kenny Loggins song) =

1979 single by Kenny Loggins

Single by Kenny Loggins

from the album Keep the Fire
- B-side: "Will It Last"
- Released: October 1979
- Genre: R&B; pop; soft rock
- Length: 3:36 (single version); 3:57 (album version)
- Label: Columbia
- Songwriters: Kenny Loggins; Michael McDonald
- Producer: Tom Dowd

Kenny Loggins singles chronology
"Easy Driver" (1979)	"This Is It" (1979)	"Keep the Fire" (1980)

Music video
- "This Is It" on YouTube

"This Is It" is a song by American musician Kenny Loggins. It was released in 1979 as the lead single from his 1979 album Keep the Fire. It reached number 11 on the Billboard Hot 100 and number 17 on the Adult Contemporary chart. "This Is It" was also successful on the Hot Soul Singles chart, reaching number 19; it was one of two entries on this chart.

The song features additional vocals by Michael McDonald, who co-wrote the song with Loggins. The song won a Grammy Award in 1981 for Best Male Pop Vocal Performance.

NBC Sports used the song as theme music for its coverage of the NCAA men's basketball tournament in 1980 and 1981.

WPVI-TV in Philadelphia had a local weekend program of the same name and had the song as its theme throughout the 1980s.

== Background and writing ==
This Is It
Michael McDonald singing soft parts contrasting with Kenny Loggins singing hard parts.

At one point in the song's evolution, its melody was underway, but the lyrics were incomplete. Loggins moved it forward after a visit to his ailing father, who had undergone a series of surgeries for vascular problems stemming from small strokes and was discouraged at the prospect of another. His perspective on the lyrics then changed: "'I've got it,' I announced to Michael, "it's not a love song. It's a life song."

== Chart performance ==
=== Weekly charts ===
Chart (1979–1980)	Peak position
Australia (Kent Music Report)	85
Canada Adult Contemporary (RPM)	16
Canada Top Singles (RPM)	9
Netherlands (Dutch Top 40)	26
New Zealand (Recorded Music NZ)	35
U.S. Billboard Hot 100	11
U.S. Billboard Adult Contemporary	17
U.S. Billboard Hot Soul Singles	19
U.S. Cash Box Top 100	8

=== Year-end charts ===
Chart (1980)	Rank
Canada	54
U.S. Billboard	28
U.S. Cash Box	58
