= Tris Imboden =

American rock and jazz drummer (born 1951)

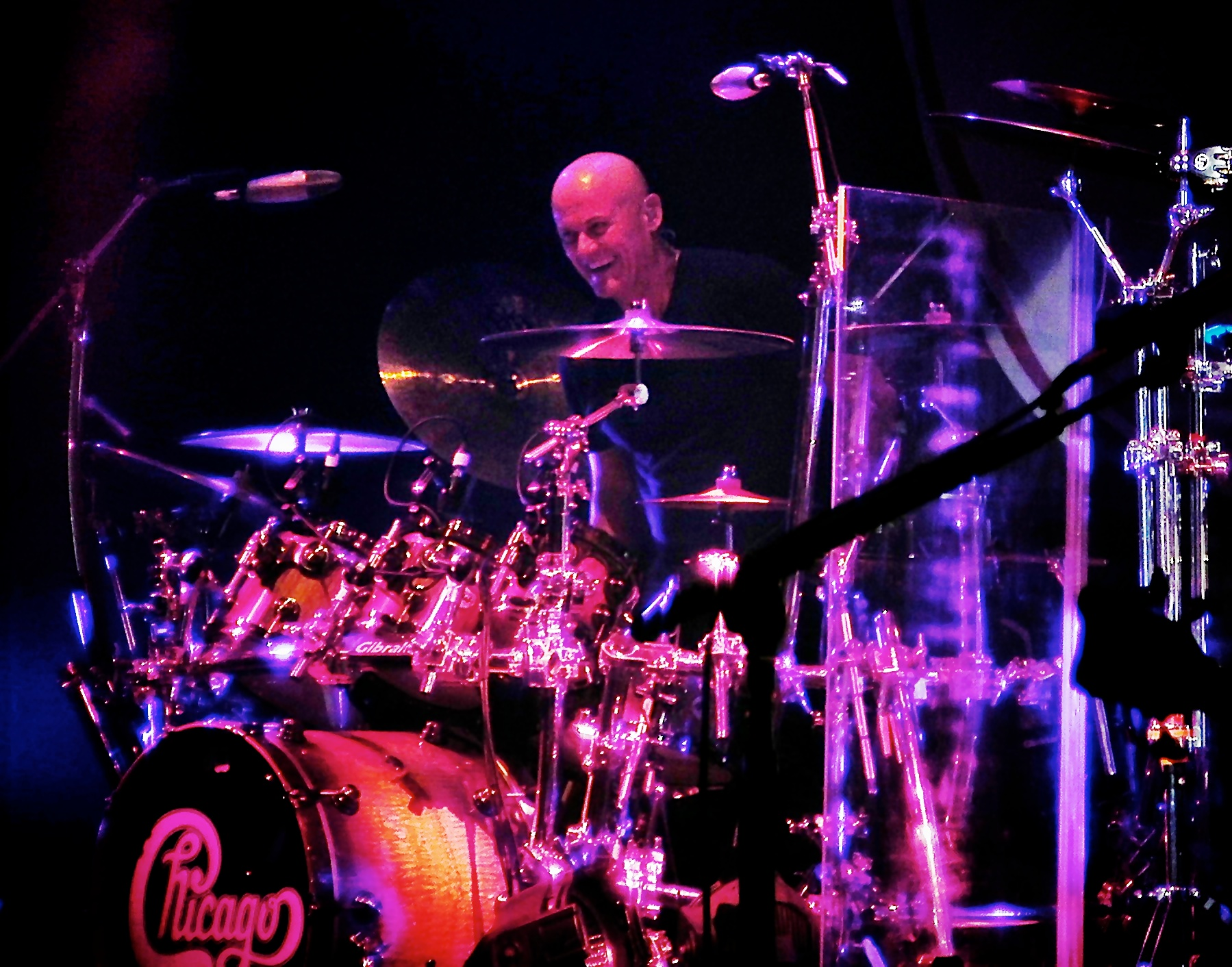
- Tris Imboden in 2013

Background information
- Born: Gregory Tristan Imboden; July 27, 1951 (age 75)
- Genres: Rock; adult contemporary; jazz
- Occupation: Musician
- Instruments: Drums; percussion
- Years active: 1970–present
- Formerly of: Chicago; Firefall; Honk

Gregory Tristan "Tris" Imboden (born July 27, 1951) is an American rock and jazz drummer. As a performer, he has performed in studio sessions and toured with some of the most notable and highest-selling musicians of all time. He was the drummer for the multi-platinum band Chicago from 1990 to 2018. He is a multi-platinum selling artist. As an educator, he has been a drum clinician and author of tutorial materials.

Some of Imboden's most notable work include recordings with Neil Diamond, Kenny Loggins, Firefall, Richard Marx, Steve Vai, Roger Daltrey, Crosby, Stills & Nash, Chicago, Anita Baker, Julio Iglesias and Stevie Wonder.

As a full-time band member, Imboden's career has included Honk, the Kenny Loggins Band (including "Who's Right, Who's Wrong" featuring Michael Jackson, (Note: Keep the Fire, credits at AllMusic. Retrieved July 2, 2013.) the six-time platinum Number One hit "Footloose", and "I'm Alright" from Caddyshack), and Chicago. His career with Chicago has seen the release of thirteen albums, several of them certified platinum.

== Biography ==
Aside from a brief, early move to Germany, Tris Imboden was raised in various beachside communities of Orange County in Southern California.

I still remember the day my dad took me to a Fourth of July parade in Huntington Beach. This marching band from Compton came down the street and the cadence that they were playing almost made me hysterical. I didn't know whether to laugh or cry.

... the drum section was just smoking ... I was so deeply moved. But I knew at that moment that was what I was going to have to do.

So from that point on I was always drawn toward drums.

— Tris Imboden

His formal training began in grade school, and until there was an available position in the percussion section of the school band, he drummed at home on a practice pad and studied basic music theory on the trumpet at school. He ultimately reached the position of second-chair trumpeter before switching to the then-available percussion section in junior high school. He currently resides in Malibu, California, and on the island of Kauai, Hawai'i, where he is an avid surfer.

== Career ==
Imboden began his adolescent career in various surf bands, and then achieved professional status in a high school band called The Other Half. The band performed at venues ranging from sock hops to Hollywood's venerable Teenage Fair, where Imboden said their popularity "clogged the whole entrance." Out of Newport Harbor High School, Imboden co-founded Honk in 1970. (Note: Honk, summary at AllMusic. Retrieved June 19, 2013.) After recording some demo songs, the band's first album was the soundtrack for the surf movie Five Summer Stories, crediting Imboden as composer, producer, drummer, harmonica player, and vocalist. Imboden established a career trend, ultimately lasting through to Chicago, of occasionally being featured on harmonica. The song "Pipeline Sequence" reached No. 1 on Hawai'i radio. (Note: Five Summer Stories soundtrack, credits at AllMusic. Retrieved June 19, 2013.) Being a member of Honk provided Imboden with formative future-career experience as the band honed their studio recording skills, their touring skills, and innumerable industry contacts. They worked with bands which would eventually serve as Imboden's future professional base by touring with Loggins and Messina, Jackson Browne, and The Beach Boys—and by opening Chicago's concerts. Honk went on hiatus from 1976 to 1986, when they established a tradition of periodic reunion concerts in their original home area of Southern California, as band members' schedules permit.

From 1977 to 1986, Imboden became a full-time recording and touring member of the Kenny Loggins Band, and then would do part-time work with them until 1989, for a total of 12 years of collaboration. During his full-time tenure there, he composed and performed the drum set arrangements for popular 1980s motion picture soundtracks for Caddyshack and Footloose.

From the end of his full-time duration with Kenny Loggins in 1986 until 1989, Imboden's career became a full-time composite of various part-time session recordings and live performances with various groups. His consistent work throughout that entire duration included part-time work with Kenny Loggins, stage support for Al Jarreau, and Chaka Khan. In 1986, he performed drum-set overdub sessions for Neil Diamond's Headed for the Future album. This provided a venue for Imboden's studio session collaboration with then-member of Chicago, Bill Champlin. (Note: Headed for the Future, credits at AllMusic. Retrieved June 29, 2013.) In 1988, he was a studio session player with former member of Chicago, bassist/lead vocalist Peter Cetera on the latter's solo album One More Story. (Note: One More Story, credits at AllMusic. Retrieved June 29, 2013.)

In 1990, his career was reshaped by joining the multi-platinum Chicago. With the departure of founding drummer Danny Seraphine, Imboden joined the band as the full-time drummer in time for the band's 1991 release titled Twenty 1. (Note: Twenty 1 personnel credits at AllMusic. Retrieved April 30, 2013.) As an integral part of Chicago for the latter half of the band's 59-year total career, Imboden would contribute to twelve Chicago records, and to tours alongside The Beach Boys, Earth, Wind, & Fire, and The Doobie Brothers. Since 2012, the drum chair has been occupied by Chicago's newest full-time member, veteran auxiliary percussionist Walfredo Reyes, Jr.

== Discography ==
Select discography
Year	Artist	Album	Credit	Achievement
1972	Honk	The Original Sound Track from Five Summer Stories	Composer, producer, Harmonica, Percussion, Drums, Vocals	
1979	Kenny Loggins	Keep the Fire	Harmonica, Drums	
1984	[Original Soundtrack]	Footloose	Drums	Billboard #1; 6× platinum
1986	Neil Diamond	Headed for the Future	Drums, Background Vocals	Billboard 200 #20
1986	Howard Hewett	I Commit to Love	Drums (Tracks 2, 3, 5, and 9)	
1987	Richard Marx	Richard Marx	Drums	Billboard #1 single Billboard 200 #8 album 3× platinum
1987	[Original Soundtrack]	St. Elmo's Fire	Drums (Note: St. Elmo's Fire soundtrack, credits at AllMusic. Retrieved June 28, 2013.)	Billboard Hot 100 #1; Grammy nomination
1990	Steve Vai	Passion and Warfare	Drums (Tracks 7, 9)	
1991	Chicago	Twenty 1	Drums	
1994	Crosby, Stills & Nash	After the Storm	Drums	
1995	Chicago	Night & Day: Big Band	Harmonica, Drums	
1997	Chicago	The Heart of Chicago 1967–1997	Drums (Note: The Heart of Chicago 1967–1997, credits at AllMusic. Retrieved June 19, 2013.) (Tracks 7, 10)	"Here in My Heart": AC #1 "The Only One": AC Top 20; Billboard 200 #55 (Note: Tris Imboden at AllMusic. Retrieved July 4, 2013.)
1998	Chicago	The Heart of Chicago 1967–1998 Volume II	(Note: The Heart of Chicago Vol 2, credits at AllMusic. Retrieved June 19, 2013.)	
1998	Chicago	Chicago's First Christmas	Drums	
1998	Chicago	Chicago 25: The Christmas Album	Drums	
1999	Chicago	Chicago XXVI – The Live Album	Drums	
2000	Steve Vai	7th Song: Enchanting Guitar Melodies – Archive	Drums	
2002	Chicago	Very Best of Chicago: Only the Beginning	Harmonica, Drums	
2003	Chicago	Chicago Story: The Complete Greatest Hits; 1967–2002	Harmonica, Drums	
2003	Chicago	Chicago: The Box [Bonus DVD]	Harmonica, Drums	
2003	Chicago	Christmas: What's It Gonna Be Santa	Arranger, Drums	
2008	Chicago	Chicago XXXII: Stone of Sisyphus	Harmonica, Drums	
2011	Chicago	O Christmas Three	Arranger, Drums	
2013	Chicago	The Nashville Sessions	Drums	
2014	Chicago	Chicago XXXVI: Now	Drums	

Complete discography
Year	Artist	Album	Credit	Achievement
1972	Honk	The Original Sound Track from Five Summer Stories	Composer, producer, Harmonica, Percussion, Drums, Vocals	
1973	Honk	Honk [1973]	Harmonica, Percussion, Drums, Vocals	
1975	Bert Jansch	Santa Barbara Honeymoon	Drums	
1975	Iain Matthews	Go for Broke	Drums	
1976	La Seine	Like a River	Drums	
1976	Iain Matthews	Hit and Run	Drums	
1976	John Reid	Façade	Drums	
1976	Harriet Schock	You Don't Know What You're in For	Drums	
1978	Kenny Loggins	Nightwatch	Harmonica, Drums	
1979	Kenny Loggins	Keep the Fire	Harmonica, Drums	
1980	Kenny Loggins	Kenny Loggins Alive	Harmonica, Drums, Vocals (Note: Kenny Loggins Alive, audio track list at AllMusic. Retrieved June 19, 2013.)	
1980	Thunder	Thunder [1980]	Drums	
1981	Firefall	Clouds Across the Sun	Drums	
1981	Firefall	Best of Firefall	Drums	
1981	Thunder	Headphones for Cows	Drums	
1981	Gary Wright	The Right Place	Drums	
1982	Jay Ferguson	White Noise	Drums	
1982	Firefall	Break of Dawn	Drums	
1982	Kenny Loggins	High Adventure	Harmonica, Percussion, Drums	
1982	Tom Snow	Hungry Nights	Drums	
1983	Don Felder	Airborne	Drums	
1984	Fee Waybill	Read My Lips	Drums	
1984	Original Soundtrack	Footloose	Drums	
1985	Kenny Loggins	Vox Humana	Harmonica, Drums	
1986	Stanley Clarke	Hideaway	Drums	
1986	Neil Diamond	Headed for the Future	Drums, Background Vocals	
1986	David Foster	David Foster	Drum Overdubs	
1986	Howard Hewett	I Commit to Love	Drums	
1987	Roger Daltrey	Can't Wait to See the Movie	Drum Overdubs	
1987	Richard Marx	Richard Marx	Drums	
1987	Original Soundtrack	St. Elmo's Fire	Drums	
1987	Original Soundtrack	The Secret of My Success	Drum Overdubs	
1988	Peter Cetera	One More Story	Hi Hat	
1988	Neil Diamond	Best Years of Our Lives	Drums	
1988	Girls	That's What Dreams Are For	Drums	
1988	Julio Iglesias	Non Stop	Drum Programming	
1988	Brian Wilson	Brian Wilson	Cymbals, Drums, Hi Hat	
1989	Clare Fischer	Lembrancas	Drums	
1989	Michael Paulo	One Passion	Percussion, Drums	
1990	Steve Vai	Passion and Warfare	Drums	
1991	Chicago	Twenty 1	Drums	
1991	Honk	Five Summer Stories	Composer, producer, Harmonica, Percussion, Drums, Vocals	
1991	Honk	Coach House Live	Drums, producer	
1991	Kenny Loggins	Leap of Faith	Drums	
1991	Usual Suspects	Usual Suspects	Drums	
1992	Firefall	Greatest Hits	Percussion, Drums	
1993	Johnny Clegg & Savuka	Heat, Dust and Dreams	Drums	
1994	Bill Champlin	Burn Down the Night	Drums	
1994	Crosby, Stills & Nash	After the Storm	Drums	
1994	Rosco Martinez	Aqui Estoy	Drums	
1994	Michael Paulo	Save the Children	Drums	
1994	Various Artists	Voice of the Homeless, Vol. 1	Drums	
1995	Cecilio & Kapono	Goodtimes Together	Drums	
1995	Chicago	Night and Day: Big-Band	Harmonica, Drums	
1995	Kalapana	Back in Your Heart Again	Drums	
1995	Freddie Ravel	Sol to Soul	Drums	
1995	Ricardo Silveira	Storyteller	Drums	
1996	Tamara Champlin	You Won't Get to Heaven Alive	Drums	
1996	Neil Diamond	In My Lifetime	Musician	
1996	Michael Paulo	My Heart and Soul	Drums	
1996	Various Artists	Sheffield Pop Experience	Drums	
1997	Chicago	Heart of Chicago 1967–1997		
1997	David Garfield & Friends	Tribute to Jeff	Drums	
1997	Kenny Loggins	Yesterday, Today, Tomorrow : The Greatest Hits	Percussion, Drums	
1997	Kenny Loggins	Unimaginable Life	Drums	
1998	Jeff Berlin	Crossroads	Drums	
1998	Jeff Berlin	Pump It!	Drums	
1998	Chicago	Heart of Chicago, Vol. 2: 1967–1998		
1998	Chicago	Chicago's First Christmas	Drums	
1998	Chicago	Chicago 25: The Christmas Album	Drums	
1998	Clare Fischer/Metropole Orchestra	Latin Side	Drums	
1998	Gary Wright	Best of the Dream Weaver	Drums	
1998	Original Soundtrack	Footloose [Expanded Edition]	Drums	
1999	Chicago	Chicago XXVI – The Live Album		
1999	Michael Paulo	Midnight Passion	Drums	
2000	Steve Vai	7th Song: Enchanting Guitar Melodies – Archive	Drums	
2001	The Howland Imboden Project			
2001	Freddie Ravel	Freddie Ravel	Drums, Drums	
2002	Chicago	Very Best of Chicago: Only the Beginning	Harmonica, Drums	
2002	Kalapana	Blue Album	Drums	
2002	Holly Near	And Still We Sing: The Outspoken Collection	Drums	
2002	Holly Near	Crushed! The Love Song Collection	Drums	
2002	Rusty Wier	Black Hat Saloon/Stacked Deck	Drums	
2002	Original Cast Recordings	Footloose [Australian Bonus Tracks]	Drums	
2002	Various Artists	Movie Soundtracks	Drums	
2003	Chicago	Chicago Story: The Complete Greatest Hits 1967–2002	Harmonica, Drums	
2003	Chicago	Chicago: The Box [Bonus DVD]	Harmonica, Drums	
2003	Chicago	Christmas: What's It Gonna Be Santa	Arranger, Drums	
2003	Robert Lamm	Subtlety & Passion	Harmonica, Drums cowriter of "It's Always Something"	
2003	Steve Vai	Infinite Steve Vai: An Anthology	Drums	
2003	David Foster	Best of Me	Drums	
2004	Firefall	Break of Dawn/Mirror of the World	Drums, Guest Appearance	
2004	Firefall	Undertow/Clouds Across the Sun	Drums, musician	
2007	Larry Klimas	The Ledge	Drums	
2007	Amy Hanai'alii Gilliom	Generation Hawai'i	Drums, percussion, and tahitian drums	
2008	Chicago	Chicago XXXII: Stone of Sisyphus	Drums	
2011	Chicago	O Christmas Three	Arranger, Drums	
2013	Chicago	The Nashville Sessions	Drums	
2014	Chicago	Chicago XXXVI: Now	Drums	

== Videography ==
Year	Artist	Title	Credit
1972	Honk	Five Summer Stories (film soundtrack)	Composer, producer, Harmonica, Percussion, Drums, Vocals
1980	Kenny Loggins	Kenny Loggins Alive	Drums (Note: Kenny Loggins Alive, audio tracklist at AllMusic. Retrieved June 19, 2013.)
1985	Kenny Loggins	"Vox Humana" (music video)	Drums, performance
1989	Tris Imboden	Latin Rock for Gringos	Drums, instruction
2012	Kenny Loggins	Keep the Fire (film soundtrack)	Drums
2002	Chicago	A&E Live by Request: Chicago	Drums (Note: Live by Request: Chicago, overview at AllMusic. Retrieved July 3, 2013.)
2004	Chicago	Soundstage Presents Chicago Live	Drums (Note: Soundstage Presents Chicago Live, overview at AllMusic. Retrieved July 3, 2013.)
2005	Chicago	Chicago & Earth, Wind & Fire – Live at the Greek Theatre	Drums (Note: Chicago and Earth, Wind & Fire: Live at the Greek Theatre at AllMusic. Retrieved July 3, 2013.)

== Equipment ==
Tris Imboden currently endorses and uses the following products:

- Groove Juice Cymbal Cleaner
- DW drums, hardware and pedals
- Gibraltar drum racks
- Remo drum heads
- Paiste cymbals
- Vic Firth drumsticks
- Beato Bags
- Latin Percussion
