= Rolnik =

Rolnik (Hebrew: רולניק, Russian: Рольник) is a Polish-language surname literally meaning "farmer". It is commonly found in Ashkenazi Jewish communities. The Lithuanized form is Rolnikas; The Americanized form is Rolnick.

Notable people with the surname include:

- Daniel Rolnik (born 1989), American art critic and gallerist
- Guy Rolnik (born 1968), Israeli journalist, executive, entrepreneur
- Eran Rolnik (born 1965), Israeli Psychiatrist
- Raquel Rolnik (born 1956), Brazilian architect and urban planner
- Arnon Rolnik (born 1951), Israeli Psychologist
- Masha Rolnik (born 1927), Lithuanian writer and Holocaust survivor
- Yosef Rolnik (born 1879), American Jewish Yiddish Poet
