= Nellie Bly Baker =

American actress

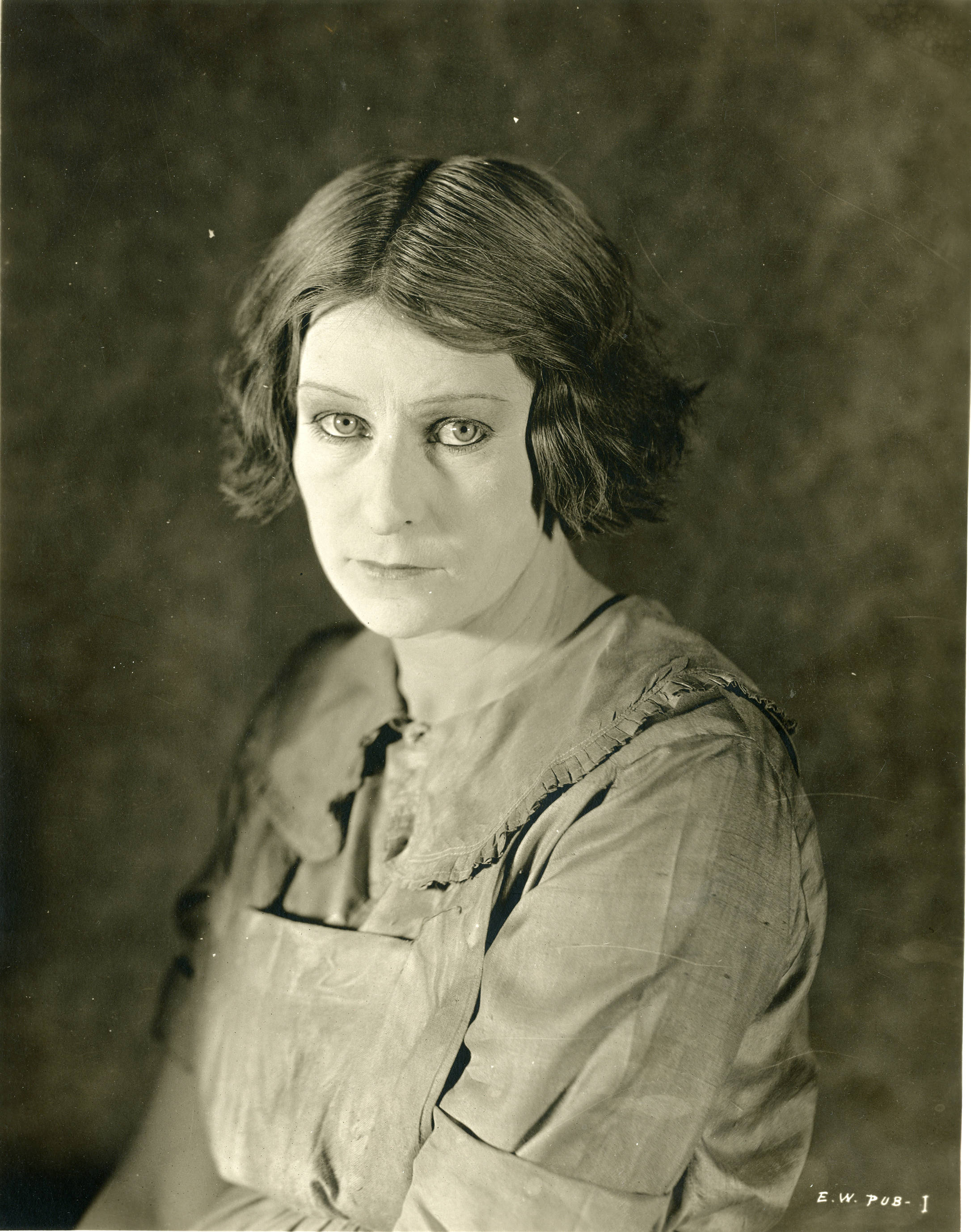
- Born: September 7, 1893; Oklahoma, United States
- Died: October 12, 1984 (aged 91); Lone Pine, California, United States
- Occupation: Actress

Nellie Bly Baker (September 7, 1893 – October 12, 1984) was an American actress active in the silent film era and early sound films, mostly playing minor roles. She is often confused with the journalist Nellie Bly (1864–1922). Baker's career as an actress took place from 1921 to 1934, and she performed in 13 films. She was never the star or had the main role in any films, playing minor or supporting characters. Many of these films were made by Associated First National Pictures, First National Pictures and Metro-Goldwyn-Mayer Pictures. Most of the films she performed in were silent.

== The Red Kimono ==
Baker had a minor role in 1925 in the silent film The Red Kimono starring Priscilla Bonner, produced by Dorothy Davenport for Mrs. Wallace Reid Productions. Baker played Clara, the neighbor of the main character. The focus of the film was a true story about prostitution. It was popular enough that a copy of the film became available in DVD format in the early 2000s. It was also notable in that it was one of the few independent films written and produced by women. In the 1920s, the film was banned in Chicago and the United Kingdom.

== Working with Charlie Chaplin ==
Baker was noticed by Charlie Chaplin when she worked in his First National Studio as a phone secretary. Chaplin cast her in A Woman of Paris (1923), in which Baker gave a notable performance as a masseuse. Baker played the slum nurse in Chaplin's 1921 film The Kid, produced by Associated First National Pictures. Baker's roles in these films were minor, but working alongside Chaplin was good publicity for her. A Woman of Paris was the film that started her acting career; her performance as a masseuse impressed other film companies that offered her roles.

== Small film roles ==
Baker played the minor role of Ellen in Associated First National Pictures' The Goldfish (1924), a love story based around each lover presenting a goldish to the other if they decide to part ways.

In 1924, Baker played Katinka in How to Educate a Wife. The film was a silent movie produced by Warner Brothers Pictures, and is presumed to be lost.

In 1926, Baker performed in The Salvation Hunters, playing the role of The Woman. Filming took place in Chinatown, Los Angelesand San Fernando Valley. It was a drama directed by Josef von Sternberg, who later was noticed by Chaplin for this film and invited to work with him in his film studio. The film was the first American independent silent film, and it was a success despite being produced with limited funds.

Also in 1926, Baker played a beautician in That Model from Paris, a silent film produced by Tiffany Productions Inc.

== Starring as a Maid ==
Baker played the role of a maid in four films, The Snob (1924), Breakfast at Sunrise (1927), Love and the Devil (1929) and The Bishop Murder Case (1930). The Snob, produced by Metro-Goldwyn-Mayer Pictures, is considered a lost film and did not get much press or popularity. It was about a married couple who part ways when the husband becomes consumed by status and money. Baker's role in this film was again a minor one. In Breakfast at Sunrise, produced by First National Productions, she plays the maid Madeline, who was one of the main characters. In Love and the Devil, produced by First National Productions, she plays a maid who plots with Barotti, a lead character, against the main characters in the film. In 1930, she played a minor character, the maid Beedle, in The Bishop Murder Case, a drama-detective film about solving a murder by "the bishop". The film was produced by Metro-Goldwyn-Mayer Pictures Corp.

== The end of Baker's film career ==
In 1929 Baker played a character named Sippie in The Painted Angel, a film about a nightclub hostess. It was produced by First National Productions. She performed in a handful of films produced by this company.

Baker performed in her last film role as a laundress in Sadie McKee (1934).

== Personal life ==
Baker was married to J.H. O'Bryan (sometimes spelled O'Brien). She was the first licensed State of California guide in the mountains and worked in the Lundy, California and Mono Lake area of the Sierra Nevada. She is also known for building the "upside down" house on display near Lee Vining, California.

Baker died in Lone Pine, California on October 12, 1984, age 91.
