= Love and the Devil =

1929 film by Alexander Korda

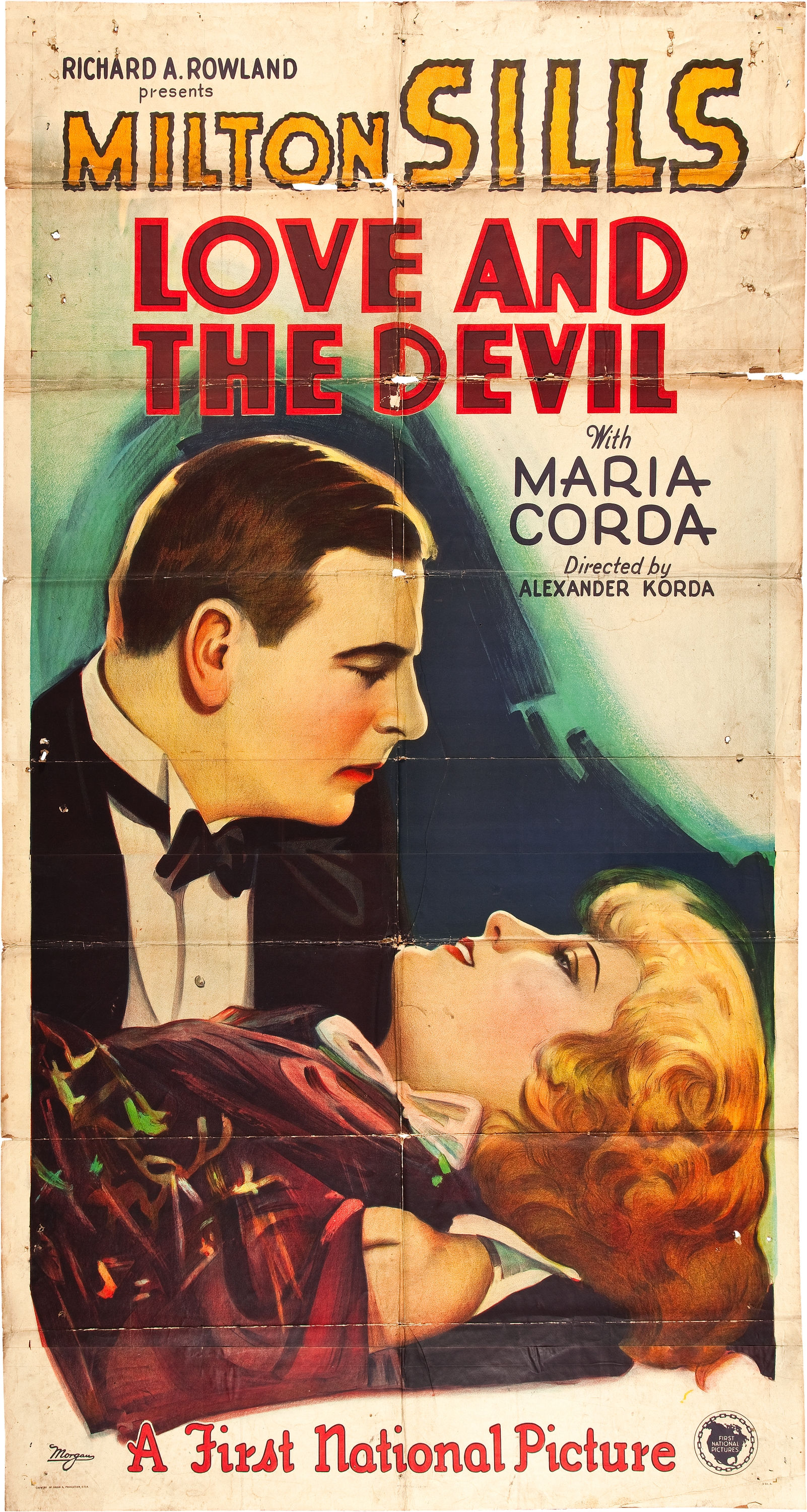
- Theatrical release poster
- Directed by: Alexander Korda
- Written by: Josef Laszlo; Walter Anthony; Leo Birinsky; Paul Perez
- Produced by: Ned Marin
- Starring: Milton Sills; María Corda; Ben Bard; Nellie Bly Baker
- Cinematography: Lee Garmes
- Edited by: John Rawlins
- Production companies: First National Pictures; The Vitaphone Corp.
- Distributed by: Warner Bros. Pictures, Inc.
- Release date: March 24, 1929
- Running time: 70 minutes
- Country: United States
- Languages: Sound (Synchronized); English intertitles

Love and the Devil is a 1929 American synchronized sound drama film directed by Alexander Korda and starring Milton Sills, María Corda and Ben Bard. While the film has no audible dialog, it was released with a synchronized musical score with sound effects using the sound-on-disc Vitaphone process.

== Plot ==
Lord Dryan, a British aristocrat and explorer, leads an expedition into the wilds of Africa and is gone for four years. Near the end of their journey, a young Italian companion, Giacopo, is killed by bushmen. Among his belongings, Lord Dryan finds a photograph of a striking young woman—Giacopo's sweetheart, with an address scrawled on the back: Giovanna Etti of Venice.

Upon returning to Venice, Lord Dryan sets out to find her. He traces her from a modest boarding house to a cabaret and finally to the opera house, where Giovanna is now a celebrated prima donna. Through mutual acquaintances, he arranges an introduction. The two fall in love, but Dryan becomes suspicious of Barotti, the charismatic tenor who seems to have had a prior romantic connection to Giovanna.

Despite his jealousy, Dryan marries Giovanna and takes her to his estate in England. There, the cold, gray climate oppresses her spirit, and she longs for the warmth and light of her homeland. Eventually, they return to Venice, hoping to restore her happiness.

Back in Venice, Barotti reappears and pays an uninvited visit to the Dryans' home. Lord Dryan confronts him and orders him never to return. But Barotti, embittered and still obsessed with Giovanna, sneaks back that night and forces his way into her chambers. He attempts to embrace her—just as Lord Dryan enters with a pistol. Furious, Lord Dryan fires.

Barotti stumbles backward, crashing against the open loggia. But instead of falling into the canal, he manages—unseen—to grab hold of a stone pillar just below the balcony edge. At that exact moment, a dislodged brick strikes the water with a loud splash, leading both Lord and Lady Dryan to believe Barotti has fallen into the canal and most likely perished. In the scuffle, Barotti also knocks Giovanna's shawl into the water, further reinforcing the illusion.

Giovanna pleads with her husband to believe in her innocence, but Lord Dryan, shaken and disillusioned, declares coldly that she is dead to him. Devastated, Giovanna flees into the night and prepares to end her life in the canal. She is saved by a kind-hearted streetwalker, who takes her in and cares for her through a long illness.

Meanwhile, Dryan is arrested for his wife's murder. Barotti, alive and hiding, comes forward as a witness and falsely implies on the stand that he and Giovanna were lovers. Lord Dryan is ultimately acquitted based on Barotti's testimony—just as Giovanna arrives at the courtroom, desperate to clear her husband's name. But in the chaos of cheering crowds, she is pushed aside, and Dryan never sees her.

Heartbroken, Giovanna retrieves a revolver and seeks revenge. She storms Barotti's apartment—only to find Lord Dryan arriving at the same moment with the same grim purpose. Both confront the duplicitous tenor, weapons raised. As Barotti retreats in panic, he loses his balance and plunges from the open window, this time for real.

Stunned, Lord Dryan turns to the woman beside him—his wife, long thought dead. Overcome, he realizes the truth at last and takes her into his arms. Their nightmare is over. Reunited, they vow never to be parted again.

== Cast ==
- Milton Sills as Lord Dryan
- María Corda as Giovanna
- Ben Bard as Barotti
- Nellie Bly Baker as Giovanna's Maid
- Amber Norman as Street Walker

== Production ==
It was the last time Korda worked with his wife María Corda who he had directed frequently over the previous decade but whose career went into sharp decline once sound films came in. Like Korda's previous film Night Watch the film had sound effects and music but no dialogue and was largely therefore a silent film. His next film The Squall would be his first "talkie", as the technology became rapidly established in the wake of The Jazz Singer.

== Music ==
The film featured a theme song entitled "Giovanna (To Thee I Am Calling)" which was composed by Josef Pasternack and Richard Kountz.

== Preservation ==
The prints of the film are currently hold in the Cineteca Italiana and EYE Film Institute Netherlands film archives.

== See also ==
- List of early sound feature films (1926–1929)
- List of early Warner Bros. sound and talking features

== Bibliography ==
- Kulik, Karol. Alexander Korda: The Man Who Could Work Miracles. Virgin Books, 1990.
