= Rolnikas =

Rolnikas is a Lithuanian-language surname derived from the Polish surname Rolnik. Notable people with the surname include:

- Macha Rolnikas (1927–2016), Jewish Lithuanian writer and Holocaust survivor
