= Ned Marin =

American screenwriter (1895–1955)

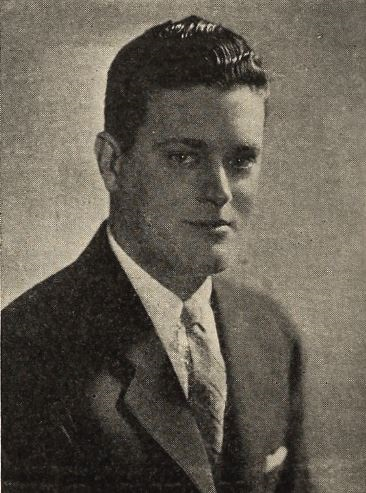
From a 1923 publication

Herman Ned Marin (May 17, 1895 – November 11, 1955), was an American producer and screenwriter. He produced 15 films between 1923 and 1937.

== Early life and career ==
Born and raised in Jersey City, New Jersey, Marin was the son of Joseph Marin. He had two sisters, and director Edwin L. Marin was his brother. He attended School No. 8, Jersey City High School and New York University.

Marin began working in the film industry in 1920 in Universal Pictures' sales department. He went on to be a producer for First National Company and 20th Century Fox studios. In 1937 Marin became an agent with Famous Artists Corporation, and when he died he was that company's vice president. His obituary in The New York Times described him as "one of Hollywood's leading agents".

== Personal life and death ==
Marin's wife of 14 years, Katherine "Kitty" Seeman (sister-in-law of Rube Goldberg), died with three others on August 31, 1934, when their car collided with a truck on Ridge Route near Bakersfield, California. A number of Marin's fellow producers, such as M. C. Levee, Al Rockett, and Harry Rapf, served as pallbearers, as did writer Edgar Allan Woolf.

On November 11, 1955, Marin died at Cedars of Lebanon Hospital in Los Angeles at age 60, following surgery for a brain tumor. He was survived by his father, three siblings, his daughter, his son—publisher John Marin—and his granddaughter, casting director and producer Mindy Marin. (Another grandchild, born to his son John the year after Marin's death, is artist/poet Alden John Marin.) Marin's remains are interred at Forest Lawn Memorial Park.

== Selected filmography ==
- The Isle of Lost Ships (1923)
- Waterfront (1928)
- Night Watch (1928)
- Yellow Lily (1928)
- Adoration (1928)
- Her Private Life (1929)
- The Girl in the Glass Cage (1929)
- Love and the Devil (1929)
- Careers (1929)
- Dark Streets (1929)
- Women Everywhere (1930)
- No, No, Nanette (1930)
- The Golden Calf (1930)
- The Band Plays On (1934)
- Pursuit (1935)
- The Garden Murder Case (1936)
- Moonlight Murder (1936)
- Under Cover of Night (1937)
