= The Crash (1928 film) =

1926 film

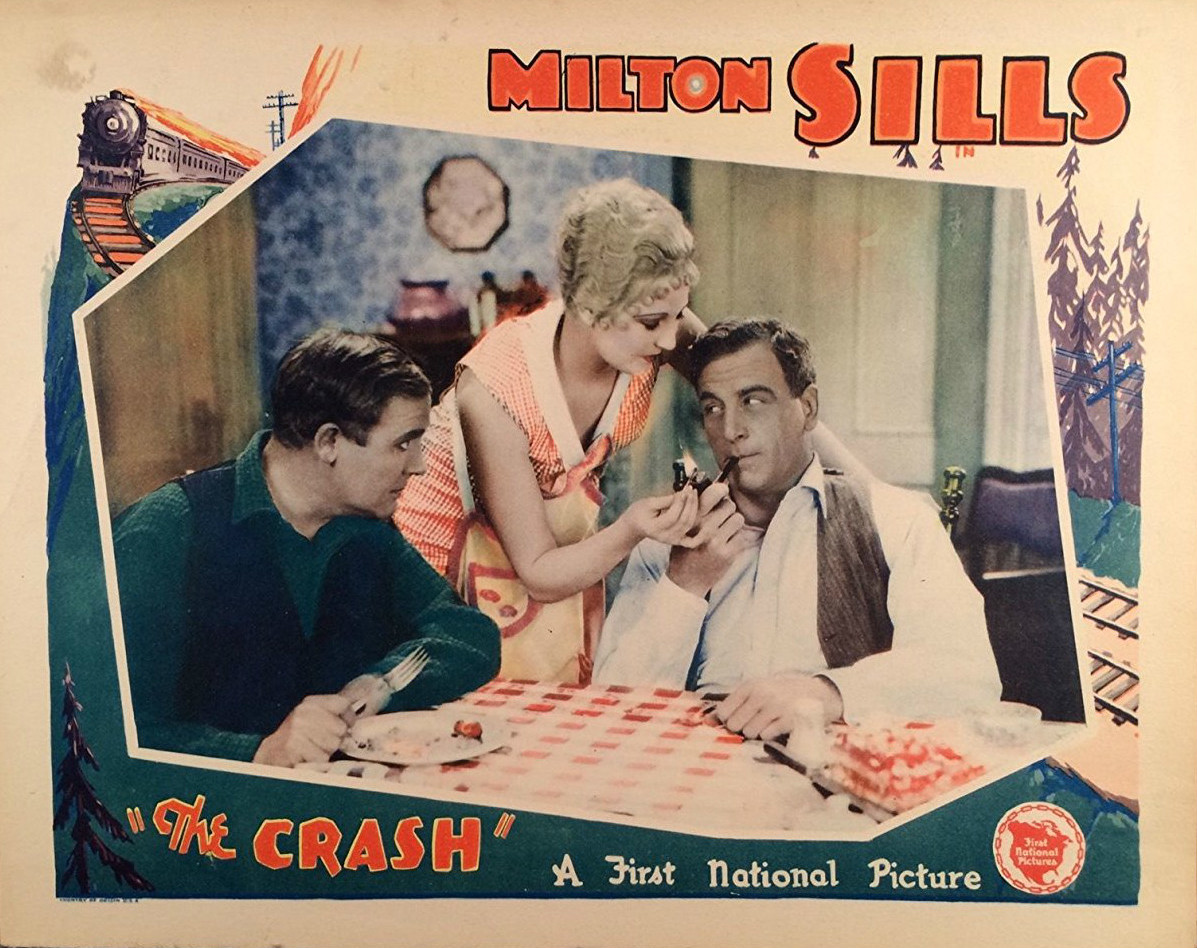
- Directed by: Edward F. Cline
- Written by: Dwinelle Benthall; Charles Kenyon; Rufus McCosh
- Based on: The Wrecking Boss; 1919 story in The Night Operator by Frank L. Packard
- Produced by: Richard A. Rowland
- Starring: Milton Sills; Thelma Todd; Wade Boteler
- Cinematography: Ted D. McCord
- Edited by: Alexander Hall
- Production company: First National Pictures
- Distributed by: First National Pictures
- Release date: October 7, 1928
- Running time: 80 minutes
- Country: United States
- Languages: Sound (Synchronized) (English Intertitles)

The Crash is a 1928 American synchronized sound drama film directed by Edward F. Cline and starring Milton Sills, Thelma Todd and Wade Boteler. While the film has no audible dialog, it was released with a synchronized musical score with sound effects using the sound-on-disc Vitaphone process. The film appears to have had a soundtrack added late in its run in an attempt to make it more popular with audiences who were largely staying away from silent films as many reviews do not mention the sound at all.

== Plot ==
Tough, no-nonsense Irishman Jim Flannagan returns home to the rugged railroad town of White Cloud, high in the snowy Sierra Nevadas, fresh from the battlefields of World War I. With fists as quick as his temper, Jim makes an impression fast and is soon promoted to foreman of the hazardous wrecking crew, the emergency team tasked with clearing train disasters along the treacherous mountain line.

One day, while leading cleanup after a minor derailment, Flannagan encounters an unusual load of passengers—a traveling burlesque troupe, stranded among the wreckage. He pays little attention to the performers until his eyes fall on Daisy McQueen, a lively soubrette with an irresistible smile and a free spirit. Intrigued and disarmed, the gruff Jim quickly courts her, and in short order, asks for her hand in marriage. Daisy, charmed by the sincerity beneath his rough edges, agrees.

For a while, married life provides them happiness. Daisy proves herself a loving wife, keeping house with efficiency. But her natural vivacity and modern habits—lounging in revealing robes, puffing on cigarettes, and entertaining guests with teasing laughter—stir Jim’s deep-seated insecurities. Raised with old-fashioned ideals and inflamed by jealousy, Jim finds it difficult to reconcile the woman he loves with the woman he sees. Tensions reach a boiling point when he returns home early one day to find Louie, the burlesque manager, paying a social visit. A jealous explosion follows: Jim knocks Louie unconscious in a fit of rage.

Hurt and humiliated, Daisy can’t forgive this violent outburst. She packs her bags and leaves town on the next train, vowing never to return.

Jim’s world collapses. Heartbroken and humiliated, he drowns himself in whiskey. He misses his next call-out and is too drunk to report for a second wreck. His crew leaves without him, and his long-time friend Pat Regan sadly informs him he’s been relieved of duty. Jim sinks deeper into despair, drinking alone in their once-cheerful home.

But Pat isn’t finished trying to help. Unknown to Jim, he reaches out to Daisy. She returns quietly to White Cloud, now carrying a surprise—a baby girl, Jim’s child. Daisy’s love remains intact, and her only hope is for reconciliation.

When Daisy arrives, Jim is at first overjoyed... until he sees the baby and, poisoned by doubt, wonders aloud whether the child is his. Daisy, proud and hurt, refuses to argue. Taking the baby in her arms, she boards a train back to the city. Before Jim can react, she's gone.

Moments later, the town’s railroad yard erupts in sirens and shouts. There's been a catastrophic head-on collision between Daisy’s passenger train and a fast freight near the canyon pass. Lives are feared lost.

Suddenly sober, Jim springs into action. Rushing to the yard, he tries to climb aboard the departing wrecking train, but is blocked by Pat—he's no longer crew. But Jim pushes past him in fury. Superintendent Carleton, witnessing the act of courage, signals the men: Jim Flannagan is back in charge.

With the train thundering over rails at record speed, Jim leads the charge. At the site of the crash, twisted cars lie ablaze. Flannagan, frantic, searches wreckage after wreckage, ignoring the flames and smoke. At last, in the final coach, he finds her—Daisy, alive but pinned by timbers, clutching the baby in her arms. With brute strength, he tears through the wreckage, lifts her to safety, and carries them both to daylight.

With a sense of relief by the firelight, their past issues are resolved. Daisy’s faith is restored, and Jim understands her love. Their jealousy is over, and the damage—both on the tracks and in their relationship—is cleared away.

== Cast ==
- Milton Sills as Jim Flannagan
- Thelma Todd as Daisy McQueen
- Wade Boteler as Pat Regan
- William Demarest as Louie
- Fred Warren as Corbett
- Sylvia Ashton as Mrs. Carleton
- DeWitt Jennings as Supt. Carleton

== Bibliography ==
- Munden, Kenneth White. The American Film Institute Catalog of Motion Pictures Produced in the United States, Part 1. University of California Press, 1997.
