= The Age for Love =

1931 film by Frank Lloyd

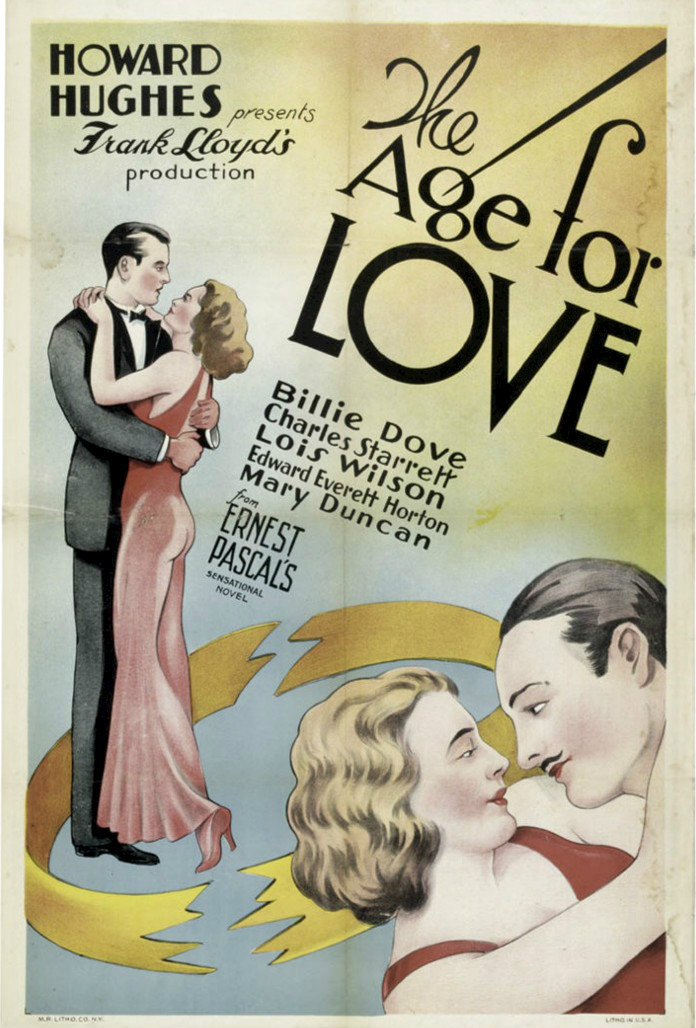
- Film poster
- Directed by: Frank Lloyd
- Written by: Ernest Pascal; Frank Lloyd
- Based on: The Age of Love by Ernest Pascal
- Produced by: Frank Lloyd; Howard Hughes
- Starring: Billie Dove; Charles Starrett; Lois Wilson
- Cinematography: Harry Fischbeck; John F. Seitz
- Edited by: W. Duncan Mansfield
- Music by: Alfred Newman
- Production company: The Caddo Company
- Distributed by: United Artists
- Release date: October 17, 1931
- Running time: 81 minutes
- Country: United States
- Language: English
- Budget: $600,000

The Age for Love is a 1931 American pre-Code comedy film (now lost) directed by Frank Lloyd based on the 1930 novel of the same name by Ernest Pascal. The film was a vehicle for Howard Hughes' mistress Billie Dove. The film was a commercial failure, but this did not stop Hughes funding another film for Billie Dove. The film's music includes "I'm Chuck Full of Kisses" (music by Alfred Newman, lyrics by screenwriter David Silverstein) and "Just Another Night" (again by Alfred Newman, Con Conrad and David Silverstein).

== Cast ==
- Billie Dove as Jean Hurd
- Charles Starrett as Dudley Crome
- Lois Wilson as Sylvia Pearson
- Edward Everett Horton as Horace Keats
- Mary Duncan as Nina Donnet
- Adrian Morris as Jeff Aldrich
- Betty Ross Clarke as Dot Aldrich
- Vivien Oakland as Grace (*as Vivian Oakland)
- George Beranger as The Poet (*as Andred Beranger)
- Jed Prouty as Floyd Evans
- Joan Standing as Eleanor
- Alice Moe as Annie
- Charles Sellon as Mr. Pearson
- Pierre de Ramey as Jules (credited as Count Pierre de Ramey)
- Cecil Cunningham as Pamela
- Edna Heard as Singer

== See also ==
- List of lost films
