= Careers (film) =

1929 American film

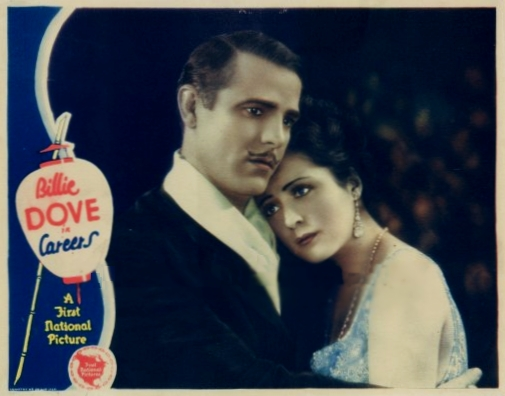
- Lobby card
- Directed by: John Francis Dillon
- Written by: Forrest Halsey (adaptation & dialogue); Paul Perez (titles)
- Based on: Karriere (1924 German play) by Alfred Schirokauer; Paul Rosenhayn
- Produced by: Ned Marin
- Starring: Billie Dove
- Cinematography: John F. Seitz
- Edited by: John Rawlins
- Music by: Song: "I Love You, I Hate You"; Al Bryan (words); George W. Meyer (music); Score (uncredited): Cecil Copping; Alois Reiser
- Production company: First National Pictures
- Distributed by: First National Pictures
- Release date: June 2, 1929 (US)
- Running time: 92 minutes
- Country: United States
- Language: English

Careers is a 1929 American all-talking pre-Code drama film directed by John Francis Dillon and produced and released by First National Pictures. It stars Billie Dove and features Antonio Moreno, Thelma Todd, and Noah Beery. The film was based on a 1924 German play entitled Karriere, written by Alfred Schirokauer and Paul Rosenhayn.

Careers was Billie Dove's first film with dialogue.

== Plot ==
In the French colony of Cochin-China, young French magistrate Victor Duval and his wife Hélène are virtually prisoners because the colony's Resident is attracted to the wife. The Resident blocks Victor's career on the bench until his wife agrees to his demands. Victor, angered by this treatment after four years of hard work, secretly goes to the governor of the colony to complain.

Advised by Carouge, a prominent attorney in the colony, as to why her husband's career has been stymied, Hélène tries to save her husband from disaster by pleading with the Resident, but inadvertently reveals her husband's plan. Afraid for his safety, she consents to do whatever the Resident's wishes, as long as he does nothing to endanger her husband. Just as he is about to take advantage of her offer, he is murdered by a native musician who has been hiding in the room.

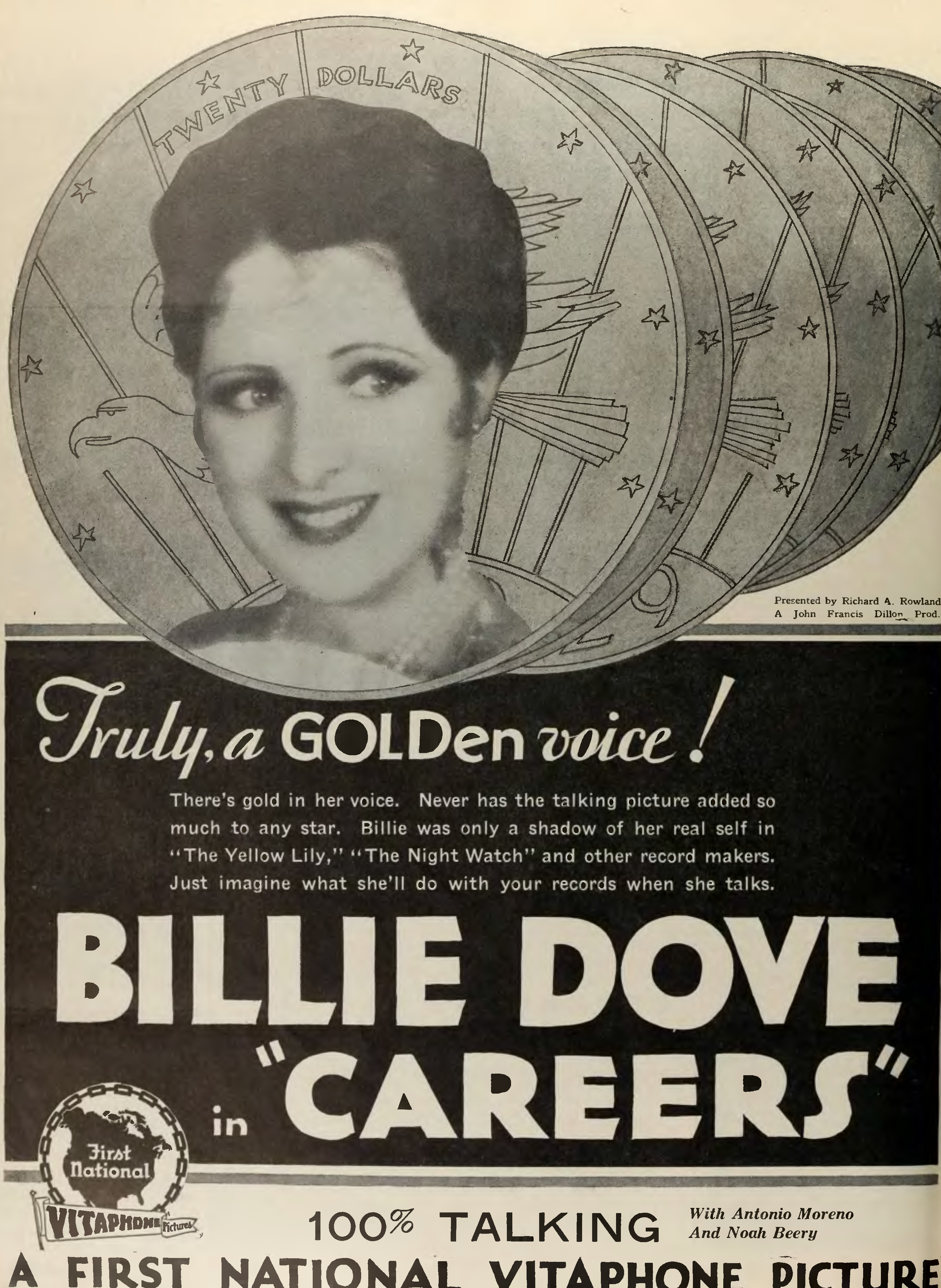
Careers ad in The Film Daily, 1929

Hélène is immediately suspected of the murder, and the musician comes out of hiding and accuses her of the crime. Victor is placed in charge of the investigation and discovers that the musician is lying, and that he is the murderer.

Tired of the dangers of life in the French colony, the couple head back to Paris, where Victor hopes to start a new career.

== Cast ==
- Billie Dove as Hélène Gromaire (Helene Duval in final version of film)
- Antonio Moreno as Victor Gromaire (Victor Duval in final version of film)
- Thelma Todd as Hortense
- Noah Beery as The President ('Resident' in final version of film)
- Holmes Herbert as Carouge
- Carmel Myers as The Woman
- Robert Frazer as Lavergne Solin
- Kamiyama Sojin as Biwa Player

== Music ==
The film featured a theme song entitled "I Love You — I Hate You (For Making a Fool of Me)," with words by Al Bryan and music by George W. Meyer. Carmel Myers sings the song during the film and it is also heard in the background in several scenes as part of the instrumental scoring.

A song entitled "My Sweet Helene," also written by Bryan and Meyer, was originally sung as a duet between Antonio Moreno and Billie Dove. This song was cut from the film after preview audiences reacted unfavorably. The only reference to the song remaining is during the last scene when Antonio Moreno exclaims "My Sweet ..." before kissing Billie Dove at the final fade out. Nevertheless, sheet music survives for this song survives as it was released before the final version of the film was edited.

During the party sequence at the Resident's headquarters an unidentified classical number is performed by Andrés de Segurola.

== Censorship ==
When Careers was released in the United States, many states and cities in the United States had censor boards that could require cuts or other eliminations before the film could be shown. The Chicago Board of Censors passed the film on a "pink" or "adults only" basis for showing at the Chicago Theatre.

== Preservation ==
The film was considered a lost film, with only the Vitaphone soundtrack still in existence. However, a print of the silent version was discovered in an Italian film archive in 2017. The all-talking version remains still lost.

== See also ==
- List of early sound feature films (1926–1929)
- List of rediscovered films
