= Heart to Heart (1928 film) =

1928 film

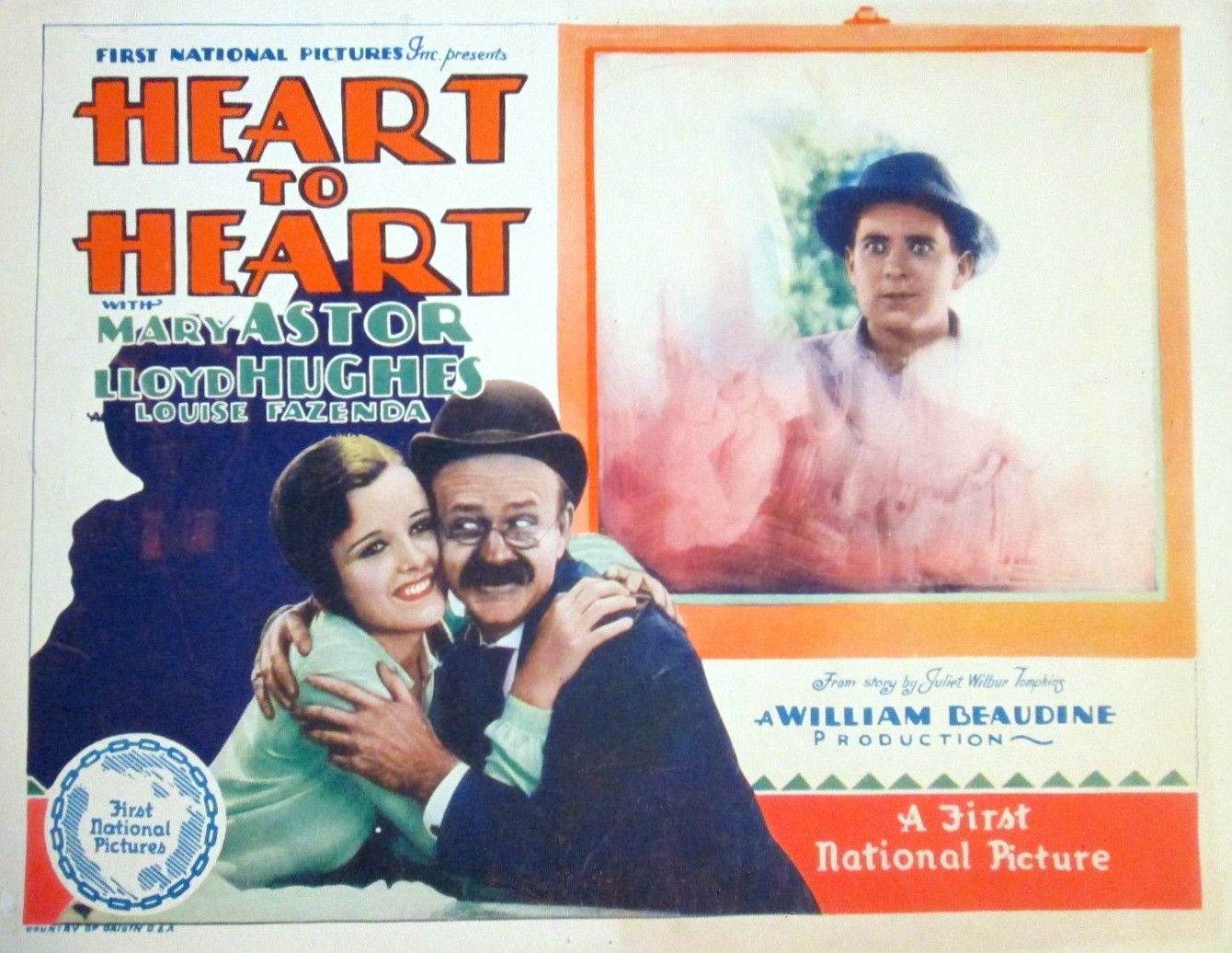
- Lobby card for the film.
- Directed by: William Beaudine
- Written by: Juliet Wilbor Tompkins; Rufus McCosh; Adelaide Heilbron; Dwinelle Benthall
- Starring: Mary Astor
- Cinematography: Sol Polito
- Edited by: Frank Ware
- Distributed by: First National Pictures
- Release date: October 21, 1928
- Running time: 70 minutes
- Country: United States
- Language: Silent

Heart to Heart is a 1928 American silent comedy film directed by William Beaudine and produced and distributed by the First National company. The film is preserved in the Library of Congress collection, Packard Campus.

== Cast ==
- Mary Astor as Princess Delatorre/Ellen Guthrie
- Lloyd Hughes as Philip Lennox
- Louise Fazenda as Aunt Katie Boyd
- Lucien Littlefield as Uncle Joe Boyd
- Thelma Todd as Ruby Boyd
- Raymond McKee as Milt D'Arcy
- Virginia Grey as Hazel Boyd
- Aileen Manning as Aunt Meta
