= Vox Humana (song) =

Single by Kenny Loggins

from the album Vox Humana
- B-side: "Love Will Follow"
- Released: March 15, 1985
- Recorded: 1985
- Genre: Pop rock
- Length: 4:09 (album version); 3:53 (single version)
- Label: Columbia
- Songwriter(s): Kenny Loggins, Eva Ein
- Producer(s): Kenny Loggins

Kenny Loggins singles chronology
"I'm Free (Heaven Helps the Man)" (1984)	"Vox Humana" (1985)	"Forever" (1986)

Music video
- "Vox Humana" on YouTube

"Vox Humana" is a song by Kenny Loggins and the title track from his 1985 album of the same name. The song represents Loggins' musical experiment with synthpop. It was written by Loggins and Eva Ein, and produced by the former. It was released as the lead single on March 15, 1985 by Columbia Records from the album, and peaked at No. 29 on Billboard Hot 100. It also the first song by Loggins after Footloose and is one of the first songs produced by himself.

The music video features artist Robert Campbell, who was the scenic painter, playing himself.

== Personnel ==
- Kenny Loggins – vocals, acoustic guitar, guitar solo
- Steve Wood – synthesizers
- Nathan East – bass guitar

== Charts ==
Chart (1985–1986)	Peak position
Canadian Singles Chart	36
U.S. Billboard Hot 100	29
U.S. Billboard Top Rock Tracks	18
US Cash Box Top 100	22
