= Smile, Brother, Smile =

1927 film

- Directed by: John Francis Dillon
- Screenplay by: Dwinelle Benthall; Rufus McCosh; Rex Taylor
- Story by: Al Boasberg
- Produced by: Charles R. Rogers
- Starring: Jack Mulhall; Dorothy Mackaill; Philo McCullough; E. J. Ratcliffe; Harry Dunkinson; Ernest Hilliard
- Cinematography: Charles Van Enger
- Production company: Charles R. Rogers Productions
- Distributed by: First National Pictures
- Release date: September 11, 1927
- Running time: 70 minutes
- Country: United States
- Language: English

Smile, Brother, Smile is a 1927 American comedy film directed by John Francis Dillon, and written by Dwinelle Benthall, Rufus McCosh and Rex Taylor. The film stars Jack Mulhall, Dorothy Mackaill, Philo McCullough, E. J. Ratcliffe, Harry Dunkinson and Ernest Hilliard. The film was released on September 11, 1927, by First National Pictures.

== Cast ==
- Jack Mulhall as Jack Lowery
- Dorothy Mackaill as Mildred Marvin
- Philo McCullough as Harvey Renrod
- E. J. Ratcliffe as Fred Bowers
- Harry Dunkinson as Mr. Potter
- Ernest Hilliard as Mr. Saunders
- Charles Clary as Mr. Market
- John Francis Dillon as Mr. Kline
- Yola d'Avril as Daisy
- Hank Mann as The Collector
- T. Roy Barnes as High-powered Salesman
- Jed Prouty as High-powered Salesman
- Sammy Blum as High-powered Salesman
