= The Love Thrill =

1927 film

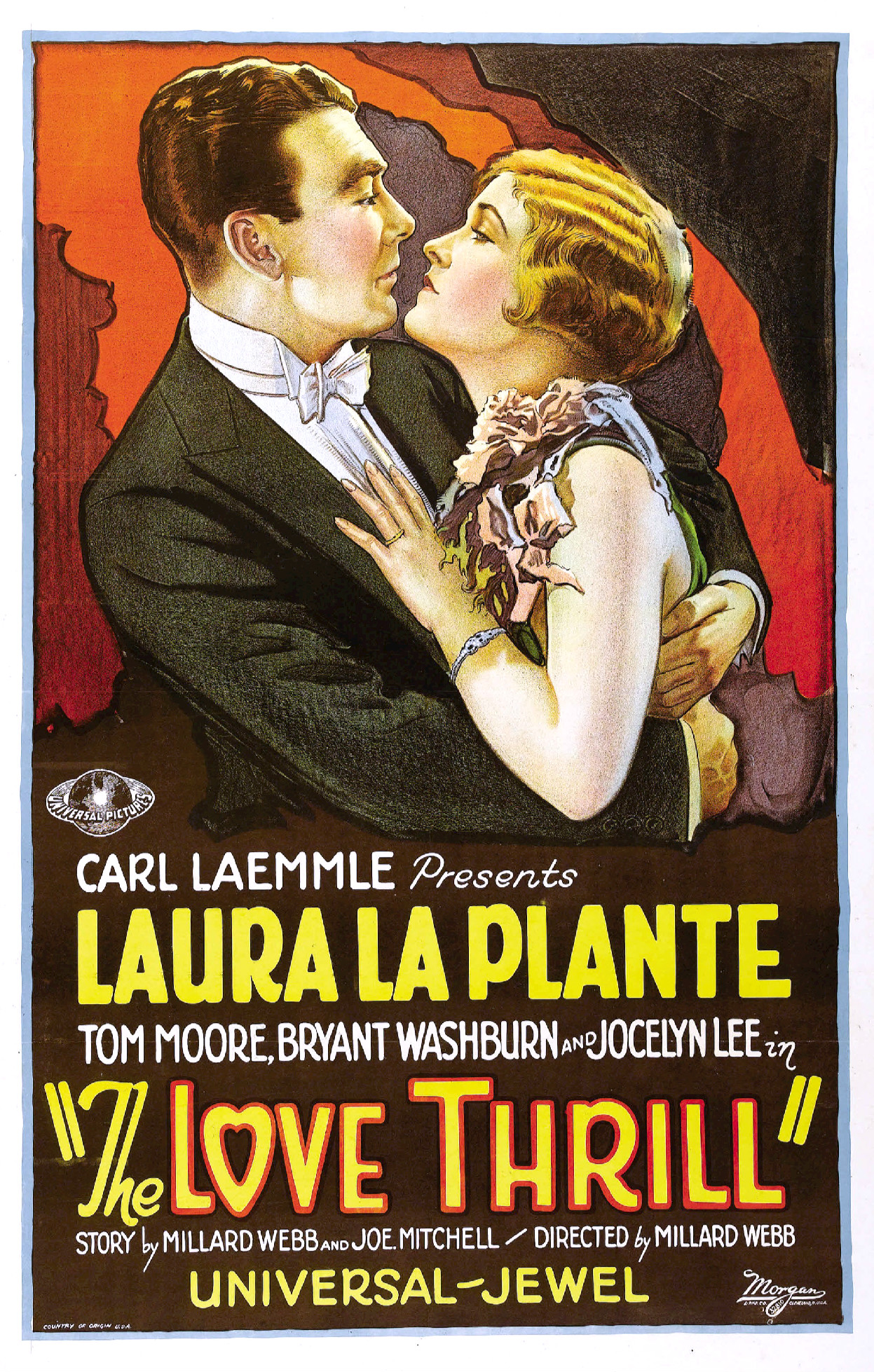
- Film poster
- Directed by: Millard Webb
- Written by: James T. O'Donohoe (scenario); Marion Orth (adaptation); Albert de Mond (titles)
- Story by: Millard Webb; Joseph A. Mitchell
- Produced by: Carl Laemmle
- Starring: Laura La Plante
- Cinematography: Gilbert Warrenton
- Distributed by: Universal Pictures
- Release date: May 8, 1927
- Running time: 60 minutes
- Country: United States
- Language: Silent (English intertitles)

The Love Thrill is a 1927 American silent comedy film directed by Millard Webb and starring Laura La Plante and Tom Moore. It was produced and distributed by Universal Pictures.

== Cast ==
- Laura La Plante as Joyce Bragdon
- Tom Moore as Jack Sturdevant
- Bryant Washburn as J. Anthony Creelman
- Jocelyn Lee as Paula
- Arthur Hoyt as Bragdon
- Nat Carr as Solomon
- Frank Finch Smiles as Sharpe

== Preservation ==
With no prints of The Love Thrill located in any film archives, it is a lost film.
