= Billie Dove =

American actress (1903–1997)

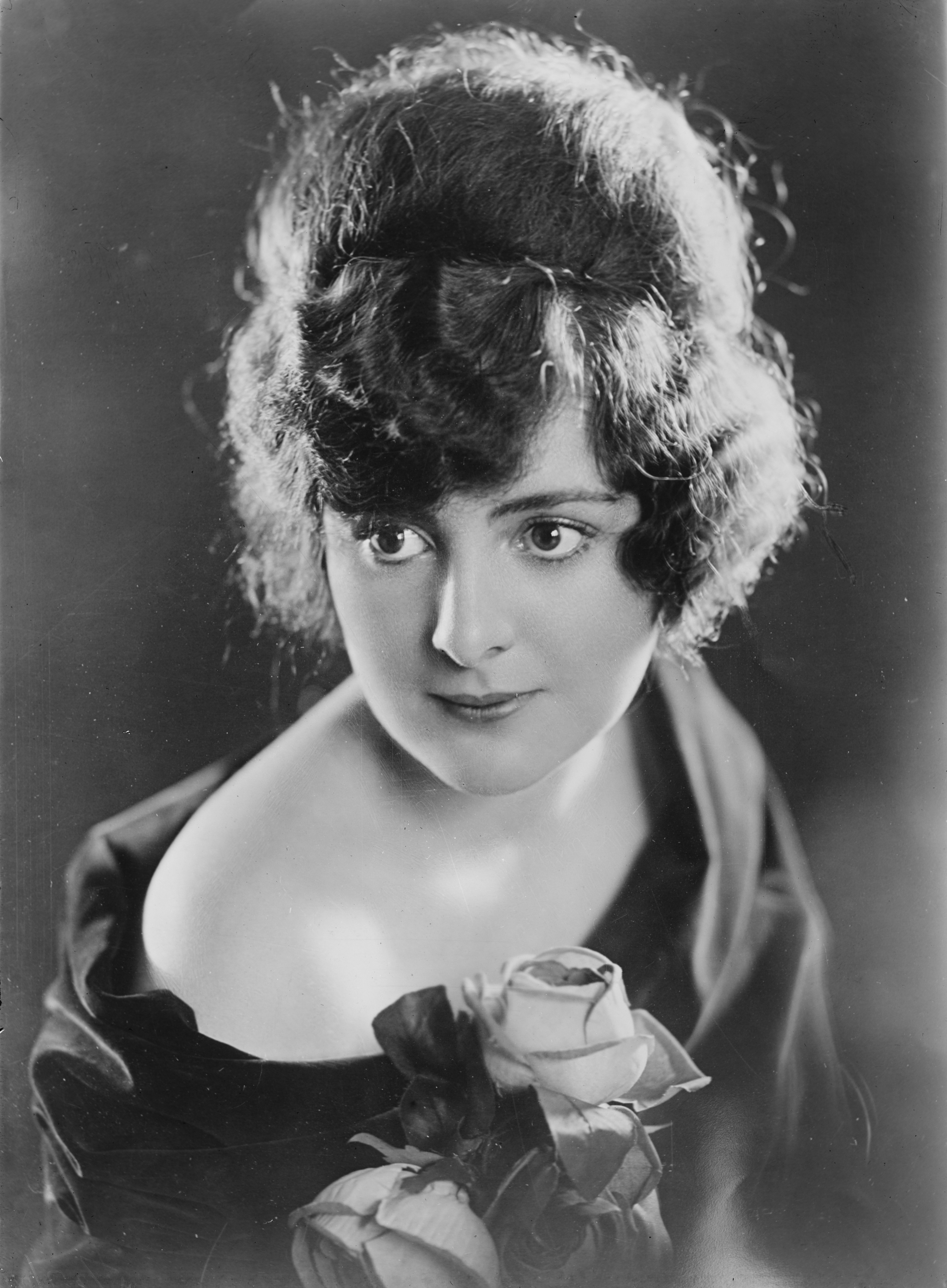
- Dove in 1920
- Born: Bertha Eugenie Bohny; May 14, 1903; New York City, U.S.
- Died: December 31, 1997 (aged 94); Woodland Hills, California, U.S.
- Resting place: Forest Lawn Memorial Park, Glendale, California
- Occupation: Actress
- Years active: 1921–1932, 1962
- Spouses: Irvin Willat (m. 1923; div. 1929) Robert Kenaston (m. 1935; died 1970) John Miller (m. 1973, divorced)
- Children: 2

Lillian Bohny (born Bertha Eugenie Bohny; May 14, 1903 – December 31, 1997), known professionally as Billie Dove, was an American actress.

== Early life and career ==
Dove was born Bertha Eugenie Bohny in New York City in 1903 to Charles and Bertha (née Kagl) Bohny, both immigrants from Switzerland. She had a younger brother, Charles Reinhardt Bohny (1906–1963). As a teen, she worked as a model to help support her family and was hired as a teenager by Florenz Ziegfeld to appear in his Ziegfeld Follies Revue. She legally changed her name to Lillian Bohny in the early 1920s and moved to Hollywood, where she began appearing in silent films. She soon became one of the more popular actresses of the 1920s, appearing in Douglas Fairbanks' smash hit Technicolor film The Black Pirate (1926), as Rodeo West in The Painted Angel (1929), and The American Beauty (1927).

She married Irvin Willat, the director of her seventh film, in 1923. The two divorced in 1929. Dove had a legion of male fans; one of her more persistent was Howard Hughes. She had a three-year romance with Hughes and was engaged to marry him, but she ended the relationship.

Hughes cast her as a comedienne in his film Cock of the Air (1932). She also appeared in his movie The Age for Love (1931).

Dove was also a pilot, poet, and painter.

== Early retirement ==
Following her last film, Blondie of the Follies (1932), Dove retired from the screen to be with her family. She married wealthy oil executive Robert Alan Kenaston in 1935, a marriage that lasted for 35 years until his death in 1970. The couple had a son, Robert Alan Kenaston, Jr., who married actress Claire Kelly and died in 1995 from cancer, and an adopted daughter, Gail who briefly married media mogul Merv Adelson. Billie Dove later had a brief third marriage, in 1973, to architect John Miller, which ended in divorce.

== Last years ==
Aside from a cameo in Diamond Head (1963), Dove never returned to the movies. She spent her retirement years in Rancho Mirage, then moved to the Motion Picture & Television Country House and Hospital in Woodland Hills, California where she died of pneumonia on New Year's Eve 1997, aged 94.

She is interred in the Freedom Mausoleum at Forest Lawn Glendale.

== Legacy ==
Dove has a star on the Hollywood Walk of Fame located at 6351 Hollywood Blvd.

Jazz singer Billie Holiday took her professional pseudonym from Dove as an admirer of the actress.

== Filmography ==
Year	Title	Role	Note
1921	Get-Rich-Quick Wallingford	Dorothy Wells	Lost film
1921	At the Stage Door	Mary Mathews	Lost film
1922	Polly of the Follies	Alysia Potter	Lost film Trailer survives
1922	Beyond the Rainbow	Marion Taylor	A copy is held at the UCLA Film & Television Archive
1922	Youth to Youth	Eve Allison	Lost film
1922	One Week of Love	Bathing Party Guest	Lost film Uncredited
1923	All the Brothers Were Valiant	Priscilla Holt	Lost film
1923	Madness of Youth	Nanette Benning	Lost film
1923	Soft Boiled	The Girl	A copy is held at the George Eastman Museum
1923	The Lone Star Ranger	Helen Longstreth	Lost film
1923	The Thrill Chaser	Olala Ussan	Lost film
1924	On Time	Helen Hendon	Lost film
1924	Try and Get It	Rhoda Perrin	A copy is held at the Library of Congress
1924	Yankee Madness	Dolores	Lost film
1924	Wanderer of the Wasteland	Ruth Virey	Lost film filmed in Technicolor
1924	The Roughneck	Felicity Arden	Lost film
1924	The Folly of Vanity	Alice	A copy is held at the Czech Film Archive
1925	The Air Mail	Alice Rendon	An incomplete copy is held at the Library of Congress
1925	The Light of Western Stars	Madeleine Hammond	Lost film
1925	Wild Horse Mesa	Sue Melberne	
1925	The Lucky Horseshoe	Eleanor Hunt	A copy is preserved at the Museum of Modern Art
1925	The Fighting Heart	Doris Anderson	Lost film
1925	The Ancient Highway	Antoinette St. Ives	Lost film
1926	The Black Pirate	Princess Isobel	Filmed in Technicolor
1926	The Lone Wolf Returns	Marcia Mayfair	A copy is held at the George Eastman Museum
1926	The Marriage Clause	Sylvia Jordan	An incomplete copy is held at the Library of Congress
1926	Kid Boots	Eleanore Belmore	A copy is held at the Library of Congress
1927	An Affair of the Follies	Tamara	Lost film
1927	Sensation Seekers	Luena "Egypt" Hagen	
1927	The Tender Hour	Marcia Kane	
1927	The Stolen Bride	Sari	
1927	The American Beauty	Millicent Howard	Lost film
1927	The Love Mart	Antoinette Frobelle	Lost film
1928	The Heart of a Follies Girl	Teddy O'Day	Lost film
1928	Yellow Lily	Judith Peredy	A copy is held at the BFI National Archive
1928	Night Watch	Yvonne Corlaix	A copy is held at the Cineteca Italiana
1928	Adoration	Elena	A copy is held at the Czech Film Archive
1929	Careers	Hélène Gromaire	
1929	The Man and the Moment	Joan Winslow	
1929	Her Private Life	Lady Helen Haden	
1929	The Painted Angel	Mammie Hudler	Lost film; Vitaphone track survives
1930	The Other Tomorrow	Edith Larrison	Lost film
1930	A Notorious Affair	Patricia Hanley	
1930	Sweethearts and Wives	Femme de Chambre	
1930	One Night at Susie's	Mary Martin	
1931	The Lady Who Dared	Margaret Townsend	
1931	The Age for Love	Jean Hurt	Lost film
1932	Cock of the Air	Lili de Rosseau	
1932	Blondie of the Follies	Lottie	
1962	Diamond Head	Herself	Cameo role
