= The Heart of a Follies Girl =

1928 film

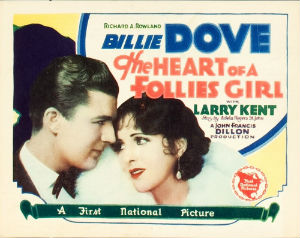
- Lobby card
- Directed by: John Francis Dillon
- Screenplay by: Dwinelle Benthall; Gerald Duffy; Charles A. Logue; Rufus McCosh
- Story by: Adela Rogers St. Johns
- Produced by: Sam E. Rork
- Starring: Billie Dove; Larry Kent; Lowell Sherman
- Cinematography: James Van Trees
- Edited by: Harold Young
- Production company: First National Pictures
- Distributed by: First National Pictures
- Release date: March 18, 1928
- Running time: 65 minutes
- Country: United States
- Language: Silent (English intertitles)

The Heart of a Follies Girl is a 1928 American silent comedy film directed by John Francis Dillon and written by Dwinelle Benthall, Gerald Duffy, Charles Logue, and Rufus McCosh. The film stars Billie Dove, Larry Kent, Lowell Sherman, Clarissa Selwynne, and Mildred Harris. It was released on March 18, 1928, by First National Pictures.

== Plot ==
As described in the film's copyright record, Derek Calhoun is at the dock to pick up an expensive imported automobile for his employer Rogers Winthrop when Teddy O'Day, a performer at the Follies, sees him. Thinking the car is his, she catches his attention, and he maintains the deception. They promptly fall in love with each other. As Winthrop's secretary, Calhoun knows of Teddy as she is also being courted by his employer. Later, Winthrop, who has been injured by a fall, sends Calhoun in his place to take Teddy to dinner and to give her a diamond necklace. Calhoun poses as Winthrop's friend, and they enjoy themselves hugely. Definitely in love with Calhoun, she turns down Winthrop's gift. Torn between his fear of detection and his fear that he will loose Teddy when she discovers that he is a poor man, Calhoun steels money from Winthrop's safe and buys a $1000 wristwatch. Meanwhile, Winthrop confronts Teddy and she tells him that there is another man. She then points him out and discovers that Calhoun is Winthrop's secretary. After thinking about it overnight, Teddy decides that she still loves Calhoun and cannot give him up. Winthrop has Calhoun arrested and imprisoned for theft, and Teddy remains faithful to him as he serves his term. Winthrop repents his action and tries to get Calhoun pardoned. Calhoun is made a trusty and then escapes from prison, buys two tickets to South America, and asks Teddy to go with him. However, she makes him go back to prison and either finish his term or get pardoned, as the case may be, so that when he is released they may face the world together without shame.

== Cast ==
- Billie Dove as Teddy O'Day
- Larry Kent as Derek Calhoun
- Lowell Sherman as Rogers Winthrop
- Clarissa Selwynne as Caroline Winthrop
- Mildred Harris as Florine

== Presentation ==
With no prints of The Heart of a Follies Girl located in any film archives, it is a lost film.
