= American Beauty (1927 film) =

1927 film

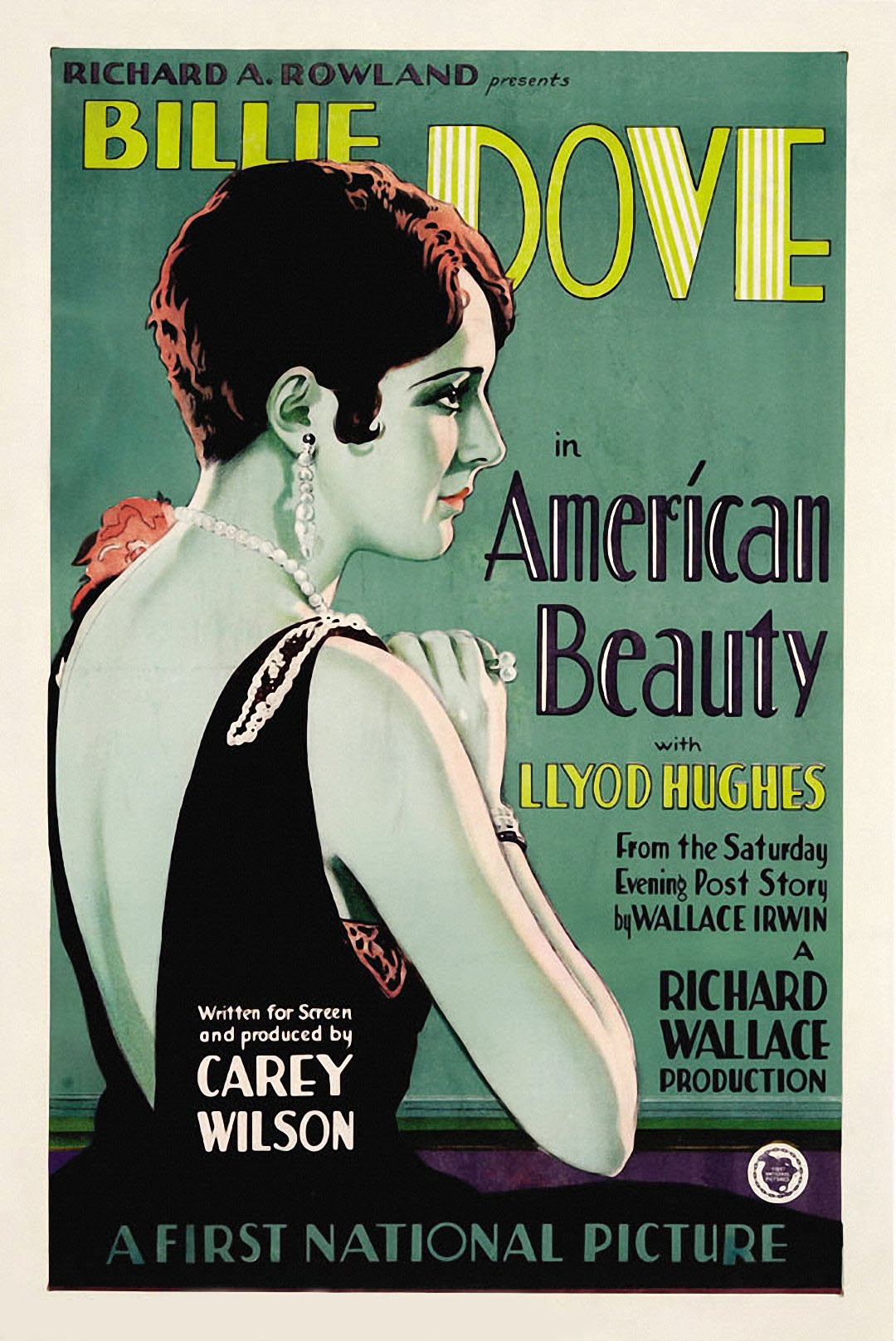
- Film poster
- Directed by: Richard Wallace
- Written by: Carey Wilson (scenario); Michael Arlen (scenario); Ben Hecht (scenario); Robert E. Hopkins (intertitles)
- Based on: "American Beauty" by Wallace Irwin
- Produced by: First National Pictures; Carey Wilson; Richard A. Rowland
- Cinematography: George J. Folsey
- Distributed by: First National Pictures
- Release date: October 9, 1927
- Running time: 7 reels; 6,333 feet
- Country: United States
- Language: Silent (English intertitles)

American Beauty is a 1927 American silent romantic drama film produced and distributed by First National Pictures. This film was directed by Richard Wallace and starred Billie Dove. It is based on a short story "American Beauty" by Wallace Irwin. Walter McGrail and Margaret Livingston are also in the cast.

== The story ==
Billie Dove stars as the title character, Millicent Howard, whose appearance and persona bring her a life of luxury. A millionaire named Claverhouse asks her to marry, but she values love more than wealth, and she sacrifices everything for another man, who is less wealthy, Jerry Booth. A number of scenes require Millicent to disrobe except for her underthings.

== Cast ==
- Billie Dove as Millicent Howard
- Lloyd Hughes as Jerry Booth
- Walter McGrail as Claverhouse
- Margaret Livingston as Mrs. Gillespie
- Lucien Prival as Gillespie
- Al St. John as Waiter
- Edythe Chapman as Madame O'Riley
- Alice White as Claire O'Riley
- Yola d'Avril as Telephone Girl

== Preservation ==
With no prints of American Beauty located in any film archives, it is a lost film.
