= Dwinelle Benthall =

American screenwriter

- Born: May 27, 1890; Baltimore, Maryland, USA
- Died: October 8, 1931 (age 41); Los Angeles, California, USA
- Education: The Bard Avon School
- Occupation: Screenwriter
- Spouse: Rufus McCosh

Dwinelle Benthall (sometimes referred to as Mrs. McCosh) was an American screenwriter known for her work in the 1920s.

== Biography ==
Dwinelle was born in Baltimore, Maryland, to William Benthall and Carrie Huber. She had two sisters, one of whom would later marry film editor Edward Schroeder (brother of screenwriter Doris Schroeder). Dwinelle was the grand-niece of John T. Ford, who owned Ford's Theatre where Abraham Lincoln was assassinated. She attended Baltimore's Bard-Avon School.

After graduating, she became the drama editor at The Baltimore American and taught English at a women's college in Richmond, Virginia. She then went to work at Thomas Ince's studio, first in the publicity department and later in the titling department. She married fellow screenwriter Rufus McCosh around this time, and the pair collaborated on several scripts together after signing at First National. In all, she contributed to more than 40 scripts, but did not get credited on some of the earlier efforts.

She died on October 8, 1931, in Los Angeles, California, at the age of 41.

== Selected filmography ==
- California Straight Ahead (1925)
- The Crash (1928)
- The Whip (1928)
- Night Watch (1928)
- The Yellow Lily (1928)
- Heart to Heart (1928)
- The Little Shepherd of Kingdom Come (1928)
- Burning Daylight (1928)
- The Heart of a Follies Girl (1928)
- Sailors' Wives (1928)
- The Shepherd of the Hills (1928)
- Man Crazy (1928)
- No Place to Go (1928)
- The Stolen Bride (1927) (uncredited)
- Smile, Brother, Smile (1927)
- The Drop Kick (1927) (uncredited)
- See You in Jail (1927) (uncredited)
- Lonesome Ladies (1927) (uncredited)
- The Goose Woman (1925)
- Smouldering Fires (1925)
- The Family Secret (1924)
