= Millard Webb =

American film director (1893–1935)

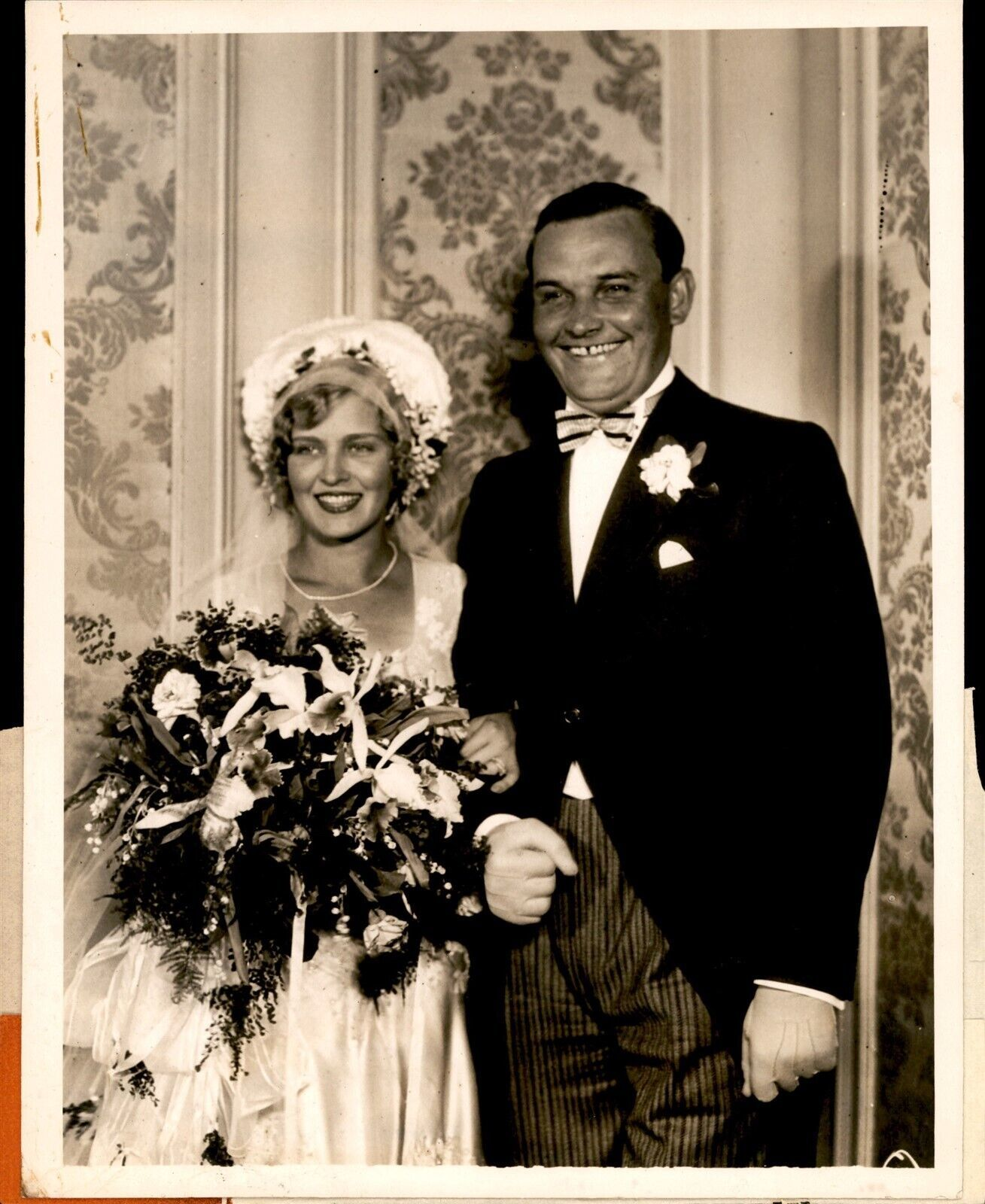
- Mary Eaton and Millard Webb on their wedding day.
- Born: December 6, 1893; Clay City, Kentucky, U.S.
- Died: April 21, 1935 (aged 41); Los Angeles, California, U.S.
- Burial place: Forest Lawn Memorial Park
- Occupations: Screenwriter, film director
- Years active: 1916–1933
- Spouse: Lydia Stocking (m. 1918; death 1923) Mary Eaton (m. 1929)
- Children: 1

Millard Webb (December 6, 1893 – April 21, 1935) was an American screenwriter and director who directed 20 films between 1920 and 1933. His best-known film is the 1926 silent John Barrymore adventure The Sea Beast, a version of Moby Dick, costarring Dolores Costello. Webb also directed the early sound Florenz Ziegfeld produced talkie Glorifying the American Girl released by Paramount in 1929. In 1927 he directed Naughty but Nice, produced by John McCormick and First National Pictures. His active years were from 1916 to 1933.

He was married to Lydia Stocking (1918–1923). Mary Eaton married Webb in 1929, but they separated.

He was born in Clay City, Kentucky, U.S., and died in Los Angeles, California of intestinal ailment at the age of 41.

== Filmography ==
Year	Title	Director	Assistant director	Writer	Actor	Cinematographer
1916	Let Katie Do It		✓			
1916	The Little School Ma'am				✓	
1917	The Man from Painted Post		✓			
1917	Reaching for the Moon				✓	
1919	Molly of the Follies				✓	
1921	Oliver Twist, Jr.	✓				
1921	Hearts of Youth	✓		✓		
1920	The Fighting Shepherdess	✓				
1922	Where's My Wandering Boy Tonight?		✓			
1923	Tiger Rose			✓		
1923	Where the North Begins	✓		✓		
1924	Her Marriage Vow	✓		✓		
1924	The Dark Swan	✓				✓
1925	My Wife and I	✓		✓		
1925	The Golden Cocoon	✓				
1926	The Sea Beast	✓				
1927	An Affair of the Follies	✓				
1927	The Drop Kick	✓				
1927	Naughty but Nice	✓				
1927	The Love Thrill	✓		✓		
1928	Honeymoon Flats	✓				
1929	Gentlemen of the Press	✓				
1929	The Painted Angel	✓				
1929	Glorifying the American Girl	✓		✓		
1930	Her Golden Calf	✓				
1931	The Happy Ending	✓				
1933	The Woman Who Dared	✓				
