= Yellow Lily =

1928 film

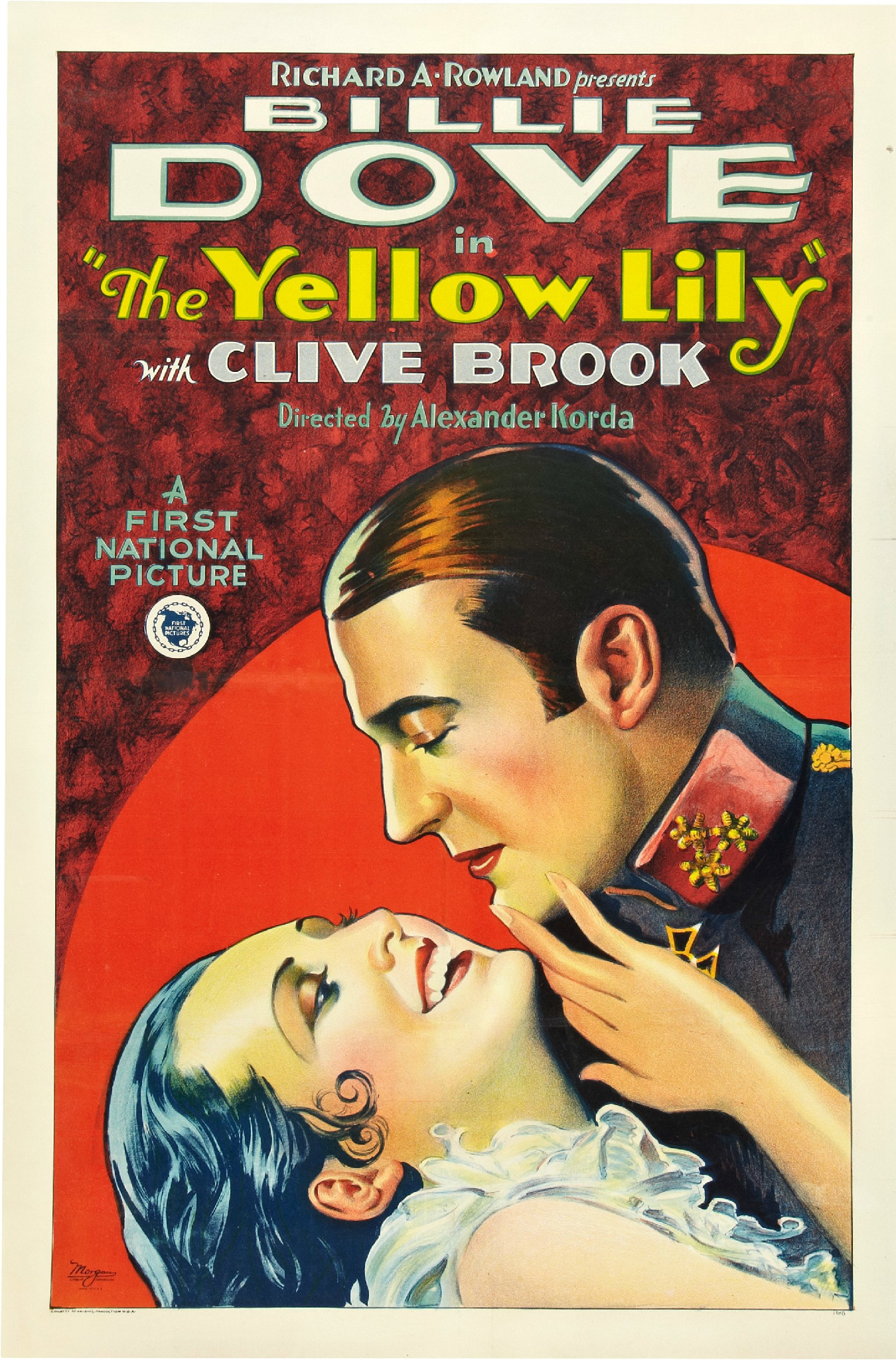
- Theatrical release poster
- Directed by: Alexander Korda
- Written by: Lajos Bíró; Garrett Graham; Bess Meredyth
- Produced by: Ned Marin
- Starring: Billie Dove; Clive Brook; Gustav von Seyffertitz; Marc McDermott
- Cinematography: Lee Garmes
- Edited by: Harold Young
- Production company: First National Pictures
- Distributed by: First National Pictures
- Release date: May 20, 1928
- Running time: 65 minutes
- Country: United States
- Language: Silent (English intertitles)

Yellow Lily is a 1928 American silent drama film directed by Alexander Korda and starring Billie Dove, Clive Brook, and Gustav von Seyffertitz. The film closely followed the formula of Korda's first American film The Stolen Bride (1927).

== Cast ==
- Billie Dove as Judith Peredy
- Clive Brook as Archduke Alexander
- Gustav von Seyffertitz as Kinkelin
- Marc McDermott as Archduke Peter
- Nicholas Soussanin as Dr. Eugene Peredy
- Eugenie Besserer as Archduchess
- Jane Winton as Mademoiselle Julie
- Charles Puffy as Mayor of Tarna

== Preservation ==
The film survives at the BFI National Archive.
