= California Straight Ahead (1925 film) =

1925 silent film

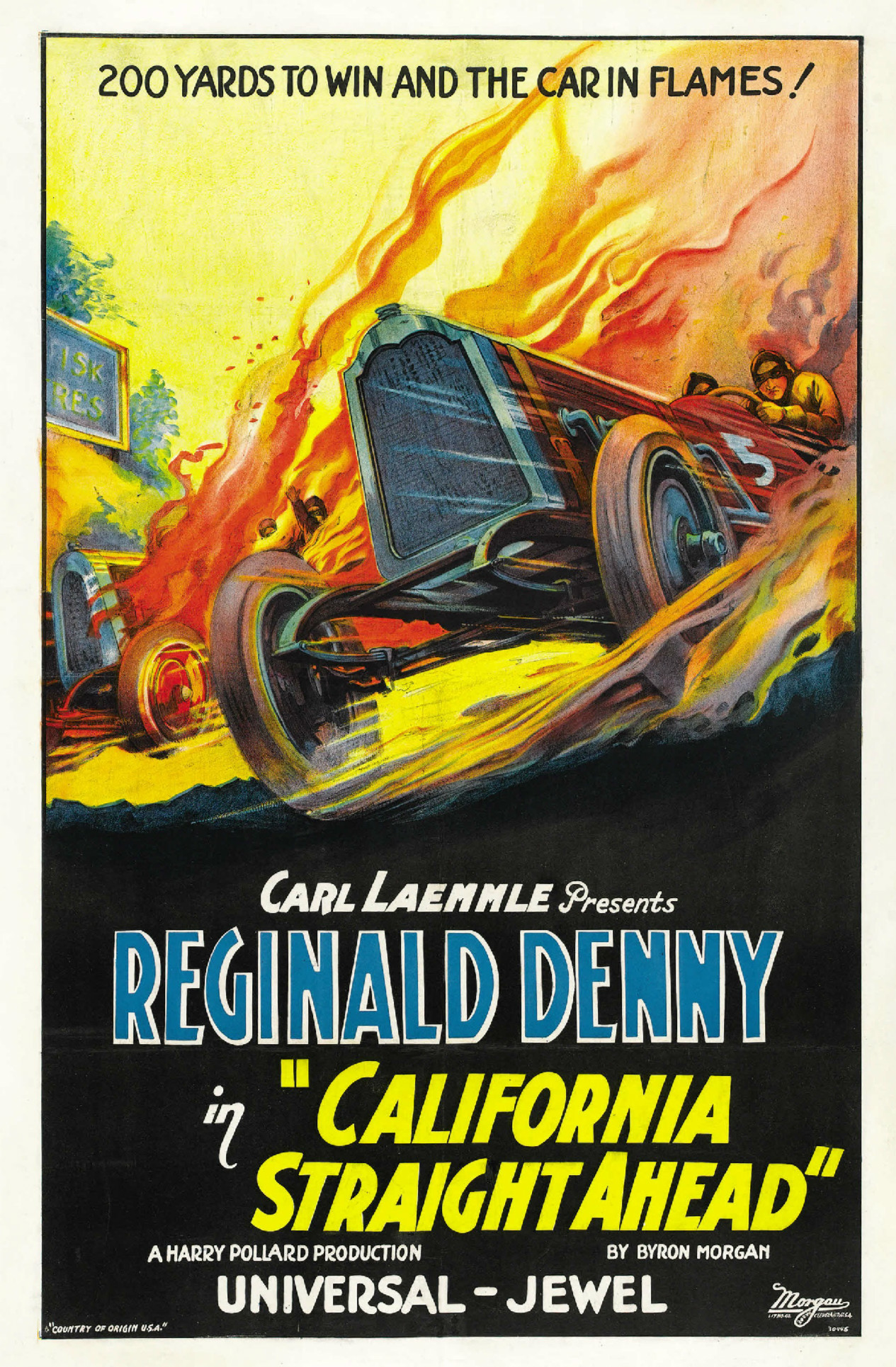
- Theatrical release poster
- Directed by: Harry A. Pollard
- Written by: Dwinelle Benthall; Byron Morgan; Harry A. Pollard; Beatrice Van
- Starring: Reginald Denny; Gertrude Olmstead; Tom Wilson
- Cinematography: Virgil Miller; Gilbert Warrenton
- Edited by: Daniel Mandell; Edward Schroeder
- Production company: Universal Pictures
- Distributed by: Universal Pictures
- Release date: September 13, 1925
- Running time: 80 minutes
- Country: United States
- Language: Silent (English intertitles)

California Straight Ahead is a 1925 American silent comedy film directed by Harry A. Pollard and starring Reginald Denny, Gertrude Olmstead, and Tom Wilson.

== Plot ==
As described in a film magazine, on the eve of his wedding, Tom Hayden entertains the boys in "The Honeymoon Trailer," an elaborate transcontinental bus he has rigged up for the bridal tour. The bus gets out of control and goes down a gulley. Tom is taken to the hospital, where he regains consciousness and remembers that his bride Betty is waiting. With the help of his faithful black Sambo, he escapes through the window to an ambulance in which an insane woman has just been delivered to the hospital. He dresses while Sambo drives. The insane woman jumps from beneath the bedclothes, embraces him and calls him her long lost lover, making a scene in front of the house of the bride, who scorns him. Betty's father orders him out and Tom's own dad disowns him until he has cut out the mad capers and proven himself a man.

The families of Hayden and Browne, hitherto friendly enemies — due to the fact that the car manufactured by Hayden has always beaten the car manufactured by Browne, who claims that Hayden's car could not beat him with anybody but Tom driving — are now bitter enemies, and the merger that would have taken place with Tom's marriage to Betty is now off. Tom takes his trailer and starts for the West. Sambo sells Southern style chicken dinners to the tourists to make expenses.

Nearing California, he meets the Brownes in an auto camp. They shun him, but Betty tearfully longs for him. They are accompanied by Creighton Deane, who has offered financial assistance to Browne's concern and counts on marrying Betty. Betty, freezing in her tent at night, ventures to call on Tom in his nice warm bus during the absence of her parents who are visiting a nearby circus. A big storm is brewing and he induces her to exchange sleeping quarters with him. The storm breaks up the circus and the wild animals escape, creating havoc in the auto camp. Tom enters Betty's tent, where he sees a lion. He jumps out of the tent into the arms of Betty's father and mother. He warns them not to go in, but they enter in a rage, then flee in fright. Tom gets to the bus and starts out with Betty, followed by the Browne family, who are chased by a bear, but catch the bus and are saved. Browne sees Tom in the car ahead with his daughter and orders him to “stop his car.”

Tom obliges by cutting off the trailer and letting it stand while he drives to Los Angeles with Betty. Arriving, he is arrested and jailed for kidnapping on the telegraphed charge of Browne. The elder Hayden, who has refused to bail out his scapegrace son, meets Browne. They have their usual spat about the merits of their cars on the eve of the races and agree to a bet of $50,000. Both get the bright idea of bailing Tom out and clinching the race with his expert driving. They go to the jail and bid for his services. Browne wins by offering his daughter as the prize. Tom drives the Browne Special and is in the lead when the jealous Deane sees him and demands that Browne take him out and put him back in jail or he will withdraw his financial support. They get a warrant for him and are about to serve it as he stops to put on a tire.

The warrant blows away and Tom starts out to regain his lost lap. In the last lap his car takes fire. To the grandstanders the game is lost, but with heroic grit Tom sticks and wins. In the face of victory nobly won, all family objections vanish. Tom embraces Betty, who comes up smiling with a face full of motor grease.

== Cast ==
- Reginald Denny as Tom Hayden
- Gertrude Olmstead as Betty Browne
- Tom Wilson as Sambo
- Charles K. Gerrard as Creighton Deane
- Lucille Ward as Mrs. Browne
- John Steppling as Jeffrey Browne
- Fred Esmelton as Mr. Hayden
- Frances Raymond as Mrs. Hayden
- Leo Nomis as James
- Hal Craig as Policeman (uncredited)
- Arthur Lake as Camper (uncredited)
- Tiny Sandford as Cop (uncredited)
- Rolfe Sedan as Valet (uncredited)

== Production ==
Wilson played the stereotypical role of Tom's valet Sambo in blackface. The use of white actors in blackface for black character roles in Hollywood films did not begin to decline until the late 1930s, and is now considered highly offensive, disrespectful, and racist.

== Preservation ==
Prints of California Straight Ahead are held by the Cinematheque Royale de Belgique, George Eastman Museum Motion Picture Collection, and UCLA Film & Television Archive.

== Bibliography ==
- Munden, Kenneth White. The American Film Institute Catalog of Motion Pictures Produced in the United States, Part 1. University of California Press, 1997. ISBN 978-0-520-20969-5.
