= Robert Campbell (American artist) =

American artist and writer (1951–2004)

- Campbell in the music video for Kenny Loggins's "Vox Humana", 1985
- Born: 18 April 1951; Marshall, Texas
- Died: 28 May 2004 (aged 53); Los Angeles, California
- Education: Stephen F. Austin State University
- Known for: Painting and poetry

Robert Campbell (18 April 1951 – 28 May 2004) was an American artist and writer from Marshall, Texas. He studied art for two years at Stephen F. Austin State University, then moved to Los Angeles, where he showed at Gallerie Rabindra. In the 1980s and 1990s, he worked as a scenic painter on MTV music videos, film, and theater. He plays himself in the Kenny Loggins music video for "Vox Humana." In 2002, he cofounded Brass Tacks Press.

== Selected titles ==
- On a Purple Spiral Floating by Robert Campbell & Pablo Capra (ed.) (Brass Tacks Press, 2016)
- Robert Campbell: Collected Works 1976-2004 by Robert Campbell & Pablo Capra (ed.) (Brass Tacks Press, 2022)
