= Brass Tacks Press =

Publishing press based in Los Angeles

- Status: Active
- Founded: 2002
- Founder: Robert Campbell; Pablo Capra; Richard McDowell
- Headquarters location: Los Angeles, USA
- Official website: www.brasstackspress.com

Brass Tacks Press, based in Los Angeles, has published over 50 books of poetry, prose, and comics since it was founded in 2002 by poets Robert Campbell, Pablo Capra, and Richard McDowell.

A focus of Brass Tacks Press has been to publish books about the "Lower Topanga" artists community (bulldozed to make way for a state park in 2006), Malibu, and Downtown LA.

== Selected titles ==
=== Poetry ===
- The Life as a Poet series, with contributors including Robert Kelly and Ariel Pink (2002-5)
- Idlers of the Bamboo Grove: Poetry from Lower Topanga Canyon by Pablo Capra (ed.) (2002)
- Eight Years by Paul Roessler (2006)
- Little Nuts by Alden Marin (2008)
- The Mystery Man from the Magic Band: Captain Beefheart's Writing Partner Revealed by Herb Bermann (2015)
- Robert Campbell: Collected Works 1976-2004 by Robert Campbell & Pablo Capra (ed.) (2022)

=== Prose ===
- Thirty Days on Spring by Richard McDowell (2003)
- Rat Tales by Baretta (2005)
- Omelet Shark by Michael Lynch (2005)
- Topanga Beach Snake Pit: Volume 1 by Baretta (2006)
- FIRST!: A Book of YouTube Comments by Pablo Capra (ed.) (2009)
- Topanga Beach Experience: 1960s-70s by Paul Lovas & Pablo Capra (ed.) (2011)
- Topanga Beach: A History, 1820s-1920s by Pablo Capra (2020)

=== Comics ===
- The Children's Guide to Astral Projection by J. A. Homes (2003)
- Prevenge of the Androgynous Cyborg Pyrates from the Future by Toylit (2006)
- On a Purple Spiral Floating by Robert Campbell & Pablo Capra (ed.) (2016)

=== Miscellaneous ===
- The Lower Topanga Archive by Pablo Capra (ed.) (2005–present)
- Malibu Song by Natalie Lettner & Werner Hanak (2006)
- The Best of Blue Juice by Blue Juice (2013)
- Mindwalk: The Screenplay by Floyd Byars, Bernt Capra, & Fritjof Capra (2020)
