= Sailors' Wives =

1923 film by Joseph Henabery

Sailor's Wives
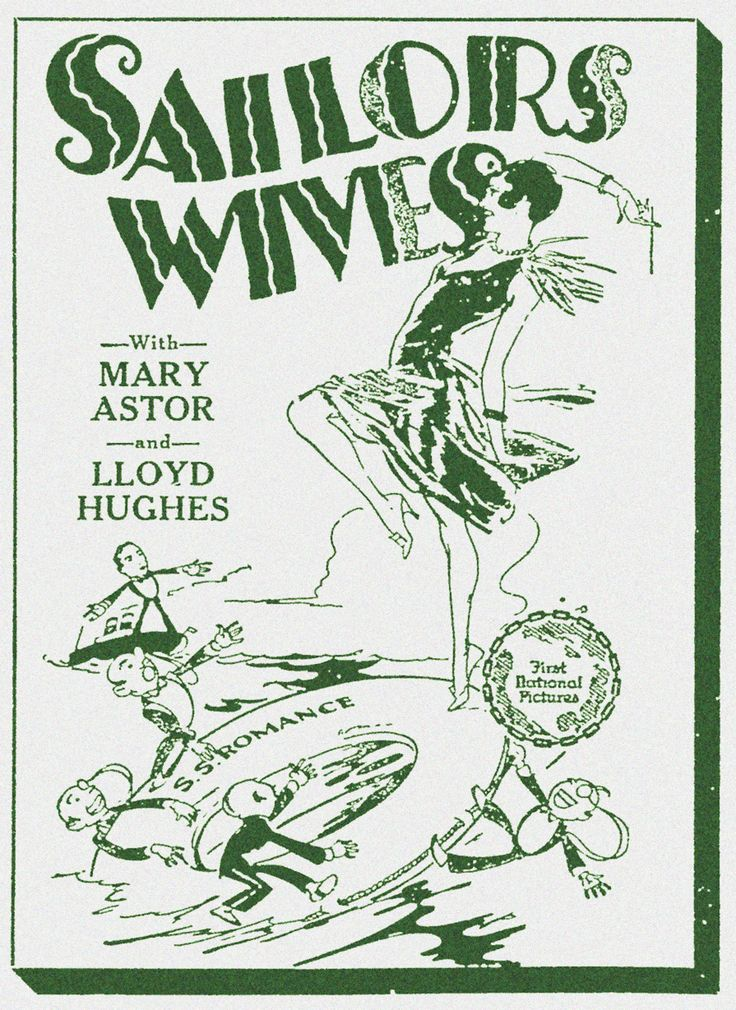
- Directed by: Joseph Henabery
- Written by: Bess Meredyth (scenario); Dwinelle Benthall (titles); Rufus McCosh (titles)
- Based on: Sailors' Wives; 1924 novel by Warner Fabian
- Produced by: Henry Hobart
- Starring: Mary Astor; Lloyd Hughes
- Cinematography: Sidney Hickox
- Edited by: Leroy Stone
- Distributed by: First National
- Release date: January 22, 1928
- Running time: 60 minutes
- Country: USA
- Language: Silent..English titles

Sailor's Wives is a lost 1928 silent film romantic-comedy directed by Joseph Henabery and starring Mary Astor. It was produced and distributed by First National Pictures.

== Cast ==
- Mary Astor as Carol Trent
- Lloyd Hughes as Don Manning
- Earle Foxe as Max Slater
- Burr McIntosh as Dr. Bobs
- Ruth Dwyer as Pat Scott
- Jack Mower as Carey Scott
- Olive Tell as Careth Lindsey
- Robert Schable as Tom Lindsey
- Gayne Whitman as Warren Graves
- Bess True as "Deuces Wild"
