= The Garden Murder Case (film) =

1936 film by Edwin L. Marin

- theatrical poster
- Directed by: Edwin L. Marin
- Screenplay by: Bertram Millhauser
- Based on: The Garden Murder Case; 1935 novel by S. S. Van Dine
- Produced by: Lucien Hubbard; Ned Marin
- Starring: Edmund Lowe; Virginia Bruce
- Cinematography: Charles G. Clarke
- Edited by: Ben Lewis
- Music by: William Axt
- Production company: Metro-Goldwyn-Mayer
- Distributed by: Metro-Goldwyn-Mayer
- Release date: February 21, 1936
- Running time: 61 minutes
- Country: United States
- Language: English

The Garden Murder Case is a 1936 American mystery drama film, the tenth in the Philo Vance film series, following after 1935's The Casino Murder Case. In this entry to the series, Vance is played by Edmund Lowe, and Virginia Bruce co-stars. The film also features Benita Hume, Douglas Walton, and Nat Pendleton. It was directed by Edwin L. Marin from a screenplay by Bertram Millhauser based on the 1935 book of the same name by S. S. Van Dine.

== Plot ==
Society swell and dilettante detective Philo Vance investigates a number of murders, beginning with the apparent suicide of a jockey during a "gentleman's race", which is followed by the sudden collapse of his father, Dr. Garden, supposedly from the shock of his son's death. Then, Edgar Lowe Hammle, who seems to be at the center of much of the intriguing going on in his mansion, is shot dead. At first suicide is suspected, until Vance notices that there's no powder burns on the body. From the choice of the weapon used, Vance suspects that one of the women involved is the murderer, but when questioned each of them tries to throw suspicion on one of the others.

At the end of his investigation, however, all the clues point to the man calling himself "Major Fenwicke-Ralston", who is in reality a hypnotist, fakir, and charlatan. When Vance confronts him, the "Major" attempts to hypnotize Vance into killing himself, but Vance is not easily put under, and merely pretends, and the Major is shot by Sergeant Heath.

== Cast ==
- Edmund Lowe as Philo Vance
- Virginia Bruce as Zalia Graem
- Benita Hume as Nurse Gladys Beeton
- Douglas Walton as Floyd Garden
- Nat Pendleton as Sergeant Ernest Heath
- Gene Lockhart as Edgar Lowe Hammle
- H. B. Warner as Major Fenwicke-Ralston
- Kent Smith as Woode Swift
- Grant Mitchell as District Attorney Markham
- Frieda Inescort as Mrs. Madge Fenwicke-Ralston
- Henry B. Walthall as Dr. Garden
- Jessie Ralph as Mrs. Hammle
- Charles Trowbridge as Inspector Colby
- Etienne Girardot as Dr. Doremus (coroner)
- William Austin as Sneed (uncredited)
- Olaf Hytten as Vance's Butler (uncredited)

== Production ==
The racetrack scene in The Garden Murder Case was filmed at Santa Anita Park in Arcadia, California.

MGM originally considered Brian Aherne and Rosalind Russell to play the film's lead roles. Russell had co-starred in the previous Philo Vance film, The Casino Murder Case, in which Vance was played by Paul Lukas. This film was the last Philo Vance film that MGM would make; the series was picked up by Warner Bros. for two films, and then Producers Releasing Corporation for three films.

== Critical response ==
On Allmovie, Craig Butler wrote that "Although filmed on a budget, production values are decent, with some especially noteworthy art deco settings" but calls Edwin L. Marin's direction "rather pedestrian". Edmund Lowe's performance as Philo Vance "bring[s] his personal style to the role and giv[es] it a small twist here and there that adds fun without violating the character's inner nature." Turner Classic Movies comments that Lowe was "well past his leading man heyday and ten years older than Philo Vance's stated age."
