= Vox Humana (Kenny Loggins album) =

Studio album by Kenny Loggins
- Released: April 4, 1985
- Recorded: 1984–1985
- Studios: Various: Lion Share (Los Angeles); Lighthouse (North Hollywood); Santa Barbara Sound (Santa Barbara); Ocean Way (Los Angeles); Record Plant (Los Angeles); Sunset Sound (Hollywood); Sound Factory (Hollywood); Bill Schnee (North Hollywood); Village Recorders (Los Angeles); Amigo Studios (North Hollywood); Devonshire (North Hollywood); Clinton Recording Studios (New York); The Hit Factory (New York); The Blue Tube (Carpinteria); Power Station (New York); Larrabee Sound Studios (North Hollywood)
- Genre: Pop rock
- Length: 43:43
- Label: Columbia
- Producers: Kenny Loggins; David Foster; Michael Omartian

Kenny Loggins chronology
High Adventure (1982)	Vox Humana (1985)	Back to Avalon (1988)

Singles from Vox Humana
- 1. "Vox Humana" Released: March 15, 1985; 2. "Forever" Released: May 12, 1985; 3. "I'll Be There" Released: September 1985

Professional ratings
Review scores
Source	Rating
AllMusic	2/5 stars
People	(favourable)
Rolling Stone	(favourable)

Vox Humana is the fifth studio album released by American singer-songwriter Kenny Loggins. Released in April 1985, it was Loggins' first album released after his appearance upon the soundtrack to the motion picture Footloose during the year prior.

Vox Humana was certified Gold in the US by the RIAA.

== Overview ==
Among those who make guest appearances are members of DeBarge, the Pointer Sisters, Philip Bailey, Mr. Mister's Richard Page and Steve George.

Don Shewey reviewed the album for Rolling Stone, favorably comparing its rhythm tracks and production to Quincy Jones, but criticizing "the overblown productions of the Chicago–Journey–Toto school of bombastic pop kitsch", especially on the song "Forever" with music by David Foster. "Forever" was written for a short film called Access All Areas produced by Jenny Sullivan (ex-wife of Jim Messina, Kenny Loggins' former bandmate in Loggins and Messina). The song was a Top 40 hit on the Billboard Hot 100 in 1985, and continues to be a favorite among Loggins' fans. Some of its success on the charts can be attributed to its use in the soap opera, The Young and the Restless. A live version was recorded on the video for Outside: From the Redwoods but was not included in the album release.

"Love Will Follow" was included as a duet version with singer Shanice on the Kenny Loggins live-concert album Outside: From the Redwoods.

== Track listing ==
All tracks are written by Kenny Loggins, with additional writers noted.

Side one
No.	Title	Lyrics	Music	Length
1.	"Vox Humana"	Eva Ein Loggins		4:11
2.	"No Lookin' Back"	Michael McDonald; Ed Sanford	McDonald; Sanford	4:51
3.	"Let There Be Love"	Dean Pitchford	Nathan East	4:07
4.	"I'll Be There"	E. E. Loggins	David Foster	4:03
5.	"I'm Gonna Do It Right"			6:27

Side two
No.	Title	Lyrics	Music	Length
6.	"Forever"	E. E. Loggins	Foster	4:26
7.	"At Last"	E. E. Loggins	Foster; East	3:55
8.	"Loraine"	E. E. Loggins	Foster	4:31
9.	"Love Will Follow"		Tom Snow	7:12
Total length:				43:43

== Personnel ==
=== Musicians ===
- Kenny Loggins – lead vocals, backing vocals, acoustic guitar (1), guitar solo (1), keyboards (7)
- Michael Landau – guitars (2–4, 8, 9)
- Tim Pierce – guitar solo (2)
- Paul Jackson Jr. – guitars (5)
- Buzz Feiten – guitars (6)
- Steve Lukather – guitar solo (6)
- David Williams – guitars (9)
- Nathan East – bass (1, 3, 5–7, 9)
- Abraham Laboriel – bass (8)
- Steve Wood – synthesizers (1), keyboards (3, 5–7), synthesizer programming (3)
- Michael Omartian – keyboards (2), synthesizers (2)
- Randy Kerber – keyboards (3, 5, 7)
- David Foster – keyboards (4, 6, 8), synthesizers (4)
- Michael Boddicker – synthesizers (4, 5)
- Erich Bulling – Yamaha DX1 programming (4)
- Neil Larsen – synthesizers (5), keyboards (7), backing vocals (3)
- Greg Phillinganes – keyboards (7), synthesizers (9)
- Bo Tomlyn – programming (7)
- Randy Waldman – synthesizers (7)
- Steve Porcaro – synthesizer programming (8)
- John Barnes – Yamaha DX7 (9), Fairlight CMI (9)
- Derek Nakamoto – programming (9)
- Tris Imboden – drums (3, 6, 8)
- John Robinson – drums (4)
- Paulinho da Costa – percussion (4, 5)
- Sheila E. – cabasa (5)
- David Sanborn – saxophone (9)
- Steve George – backing vocals (3)
- Marilyn Martin – backing vocals (3, 9)
- Donna McDaniel – backing vocals (3, 9)
- Richard Page – backing vocals (3)
- Hamish Stuart – backing vocals (3)
- Guy Thomas – backing vocals (3)
- Bunny DeBarge – backing vocals (4)
- El Debarge – backing vocals (4)
- The Pointer Sisters – backing vocals (5)
- Carl Anderson – backing vocals (7)
- Philip Bailey – backing vocals (7)
- Carl Caldwell – backing vocals (7)

=== Technical ===
- Produced by Kenny Loggins, Michael Omartian (2), and David Foster (6)
- Production coordinators – David Warren Bowers and Arlene Matza
- Engineered by Humberto Gatica, Terry Christian, Jack Joseph Puig, Mark Linett, Terry Nelson, John Guess, Mark Ettel, Elliot Scheiner, Ed Rak, and Bobby Cohen
- Mixed by Terry Nelson (1, 7), John Guess (2), Humberto Gatica (3, 4, 6, 8, 9), and John "Jellybean" Benitez (5), and Michael Hutchinson (5)
- Second engineers – David Warren Bowers, Steve Crimmel, Larry Ferguson, Cliff Jones, Laura Livingston, and Stephen Shelton
- Assistant mixing engineers – David Warren Bowers and Stephen Shelton (3, 4, 6, 8, 9); Sabrina Buchanek (5)
- Mix technician – Murray Kunis
- Mastered by George Marino at Sterling Sound (New York, NY)
- Art direction – Tony Lane and Nancy Donald
- Inner sleeve photography – Lester Cohen, Daryl Weisser, Sam Emerson, and Harrison Funk
- Back cover photography – Greg Gorman
- Cover artwork – Michael Gonzales
- Management – Larry Larson & Associates
