= The Family Secret (1924 film) =

1924 film by William A. Seiter

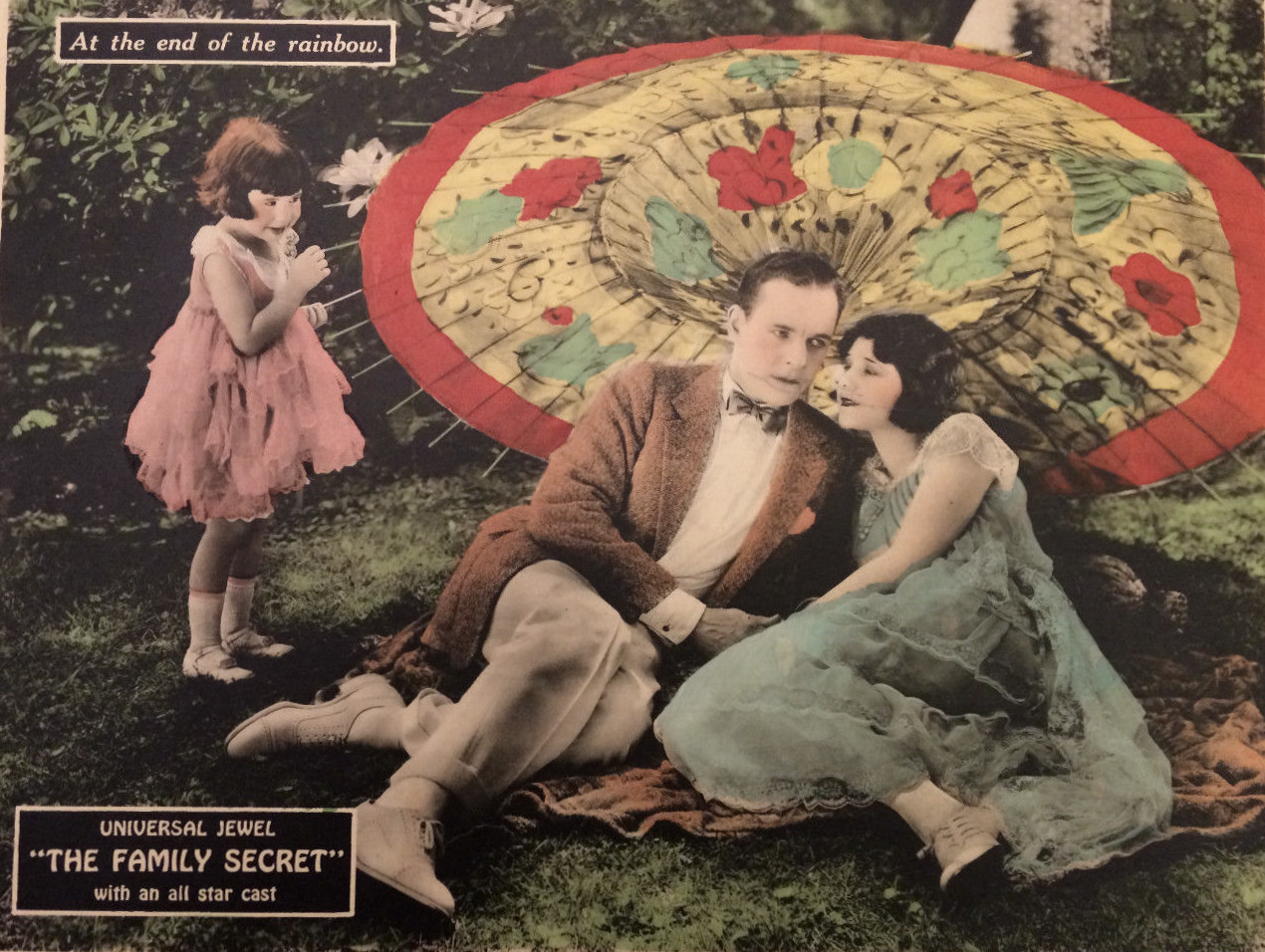
- Lobby card
- Directed by: William A. Seiter
- Written by: Lois Zellner (scenario); Dwinelle Benthall (titles)
- Based on: Editha's Burglar; 1878 novel by Frances Hodgson Burnett
- Produced by: Carl Laemmle
- Starring: Baby Peggy; Gladys Hulette; Frank Currier; Edward Earle
- Cinematography: John Stumar
- Edited by: Ralph Dietrich
- Distributed by: Universal Pictures
- Release date: September 28, 1924
- Running time: 70 minutes
- Country: United States
- Language: Silent (English intertitles)

The Family Secret is a 1924 American silent drama film directed by William A. Seiter and featuring child star Baby Peggy. It is based on Editha's Burglar, a story by Frances Hodgson Burnett first published in 1881 by St. Nicholas Magazine and adapted for the stage by Augustus E. Thomas.

== Plot ==
Margaret Selfridge lives with her affluent father, Simon and her Aunt Abigail in a mansion in New York City. She is involved in a romantic relationship with Garry Homes, an honest man from a modest background.

While walking through the city one day, Garry discovers Peggy crying outside a fruit stand, lost and alone. He quickly becomes fond of her, but he does not recognize her as his daughter, and takes her to the police station. The police call the Selfridges, but Garry leaves before they arrive to claim Peggy. He does however leave his dog behind to watch over Peggy; she becomes immediately attached to him and insists on adopting him.

Another ex-convict engages Garry to help him commit a burglary. He is reluctant to participate, but finally decides that the money will help him get back on his feet.

The Selfridge family decamps to their mansion in Westchester County, New York for the summer. One evening, Peggy asks if she can borrow her mother's most cherished possession: her wedding ring, which she wears on a chain around her neck. Margaret agrees, and Peggy happily wears the necklace to bed.

That night, Peggy is woken by noise in the house. She investigates and discovers Garry in the study as he is in the process of robbing the safe. She tells him he cannot steal her grandfather's jewels, and offers him Margaret's necklace in exchange. Garry immediately recognizes the ring on the necklace, and realizes that Peggy must be his daughter. Before he has a chance to explain the situation, Simon Selfridge returns home. He does not recognize Garry and shoots him, believing him to be an intruder.

Simon calls a doctor, and Garry eventually recovers from his injury. Simon finally reconciles with his daughter and welcomes Garry to their home. The film concludes with the entire Selfridge clan, Garry included, living as a happy family.

== Cast ==
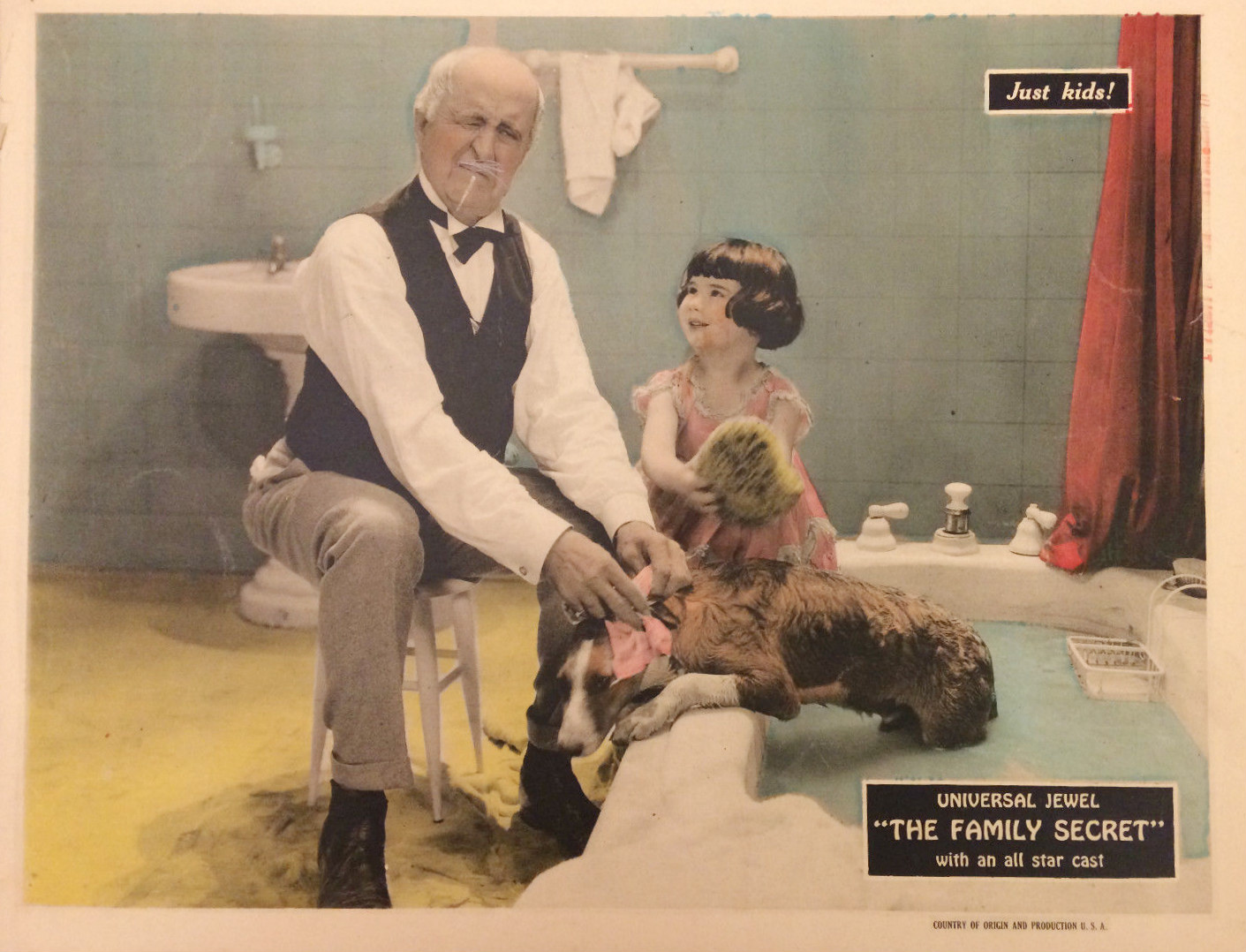
Lobby card with Frank Currier and Baby Peggy

- Baby Peggy as Peggy Holmes
- Gladys Hulette as Margaret Selfridge
- Frank Currier as Simon Selfridge
- Lucy Beaumont as Miss Abigail Selfridge
- Edward Earle as Garry Holmes
- Martin Turner as Uncle Mose
- Elizabeth Mackey as Aunt Mandy
- Martha Mattox as Nurse Sneed
- Cesare Gravina as Tomaso Silvano
- Matthew Betz as Crook (uncredited)
- John Hatton as Boy Peggy befriends (uncredited)
- Rose Plumer as Foreign Missionary (uncredited)
- Tiny Sandford as Cop (uncredited)

== Preservation ==
The Family Secret is one of only five of Baby Peggy's full-length feature films to have survived to the present day with copies at the Library of Congress and in private film collections. Several versions of the film have been released on DVD.
