= Naughty but Nice (1927 film) =

1927 film by Millard Webb

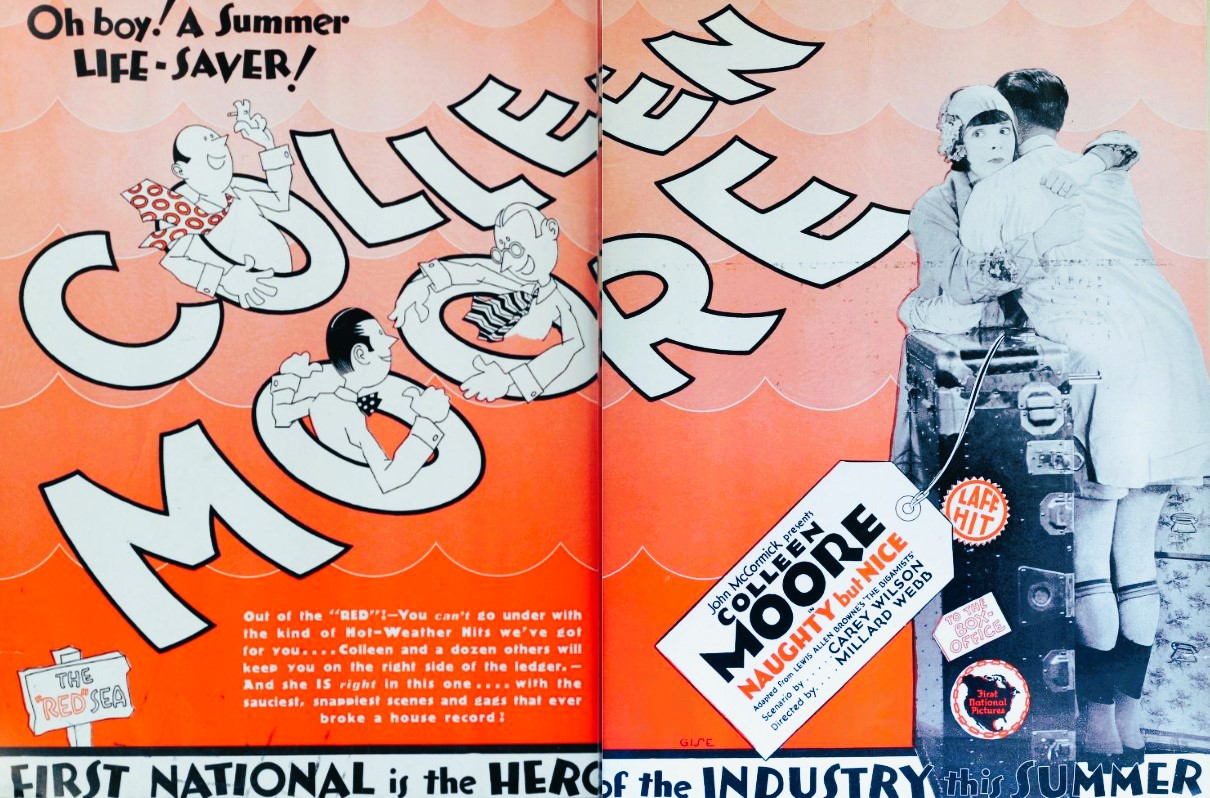
- Advertisement
- Directed by: Millard Webb
- Written by: Carey Wilson
- Based on: "The Bigamists" by Lewis Allen Browne
- Produced by: John McCormick
- Starring: Colleen Moore
- Cinematography: George J. Folsey
- Edited by: Alexander Hall
- Production company: John McCormack Productions
- Distributed by: First National Pictures
- Release date: June 26, 1927 (US)
- Running time: 70 minutes
- Country: United States
- Language: Silent (English intertitles)

Naughty but Nice is a 1927 American silent romantic comedy film directed by Millard Webb. Colleen Moore plays Bernice Sumners, a hayseed sent to a ritzy boarding school for finishing after her family strikes it rich in oil.

== Plot ==
Bernice Sumners is sent to a finishing school by her Texas uncle after oil is discovered on his property. At the school she blossoms into a young woman. Bernice is a compulsive liar. One evening she and a friend go to a hotel before a theater date, planning to meet popular Paul Carroll, but they run into the school principal in the hotel lobby. Bernice tells a lie about why they are there, and from there one lie builds upon the other until Bernice ends up in the hotel room of Ralph Ames of the Secret Service, who is in the process of changing (thus, the poster graphic of a man's bare legs in garters). Bernice calls Ralph her husband, and he plays along until the house of cards comes crumbling down around her. She ends up falling for the popular Paul Carroll, and the two marry.

== Cast ==
- Colleen Moore as Berenice Summers
- Donald Reed as Paul Carroll
- Claude Gillingwater as Judge John R. Altwold
- Kathryn McGuire as Alice Altwold
- Hallam Cooley as Ralph Ames
- Edythe Chapman as Mrs. Altwold
- Clarissa Selwynne as Miss Perkins
- Burr McIntosh as Uncle Seth Summers

Cast notes:

- Loretta Young appeared in Naughty but Nice unbilled. She was known as Gretchen Young at that time.

== Preservation ==
A print of Naughty but Nice is located at the Filmoteca de Catalunya.
