= Alden Marin =

American poet & painter (born 1956)

- Born: August 4, 1956 (age 70); Greenwich, Connecticut, U.S.
- Occupations: Poet, Painter
- Years active: 1975–present

Alden Marin (born August 4, 1956) is a poet and painter based in Pacific Palisades, California. He has written more than twenty books, including Let's Face It!: Selected Poems 1974-2015.

== Early life ==
Marin's family moved to Malibu in the 1920s, becoming one of the first residents of the new Malibu Movie Colony. A sensitivity to the beauty of nature, learned while hiking and surfing in this rural suburb of Los Angeles, has been a great influence on Marin's work, as have trips taken in his youth to countries like France, Switzerland, Greece and India. He has worked as a wine distributor since the 1980s, and wrote a wine column for LA Style magazine from 1986 until 1989. Cartoonist Rube Goldberg is his great uncle.

== Poetry ==
Marin majored in American Studies, with a minor in Creative Writing/Poetry and French, at Stanford University (class of '78). He worked at the university's literary journal Sequoia, edited by fellow student Dana Gioia, who later served as a chairman of the National Endowment for the Arts. Among his professors were notable poets Timothy Steele, Alan Shapiro, and Donald Davie. Marin focused his studies on the works of Gary Snyder, Richard Brautigan, and Ezra Pound. His writing has been translated into Vietnamese and has been associated with the Vietnamese New Formalism poetry movement, a blending of Vietnamese poetry and American New Formalism.

The colloquial style of Marin's poetry is easily accessible—and, at the same time, spontaneous and visceral. His poems often connect daily minutiae to existential dilemmas, as in The Problem with Oxnard, which he wrote from the perspective of Chicano farm workers.

In books like Little Nuts (Brass Tacks Press, 2008), he champions a new form of short poem that seems to forgo all poetic devices:

"Not Not Poetry"

There's a guy who works at PC Greens to whom I

give my poetry books. Today he said, "I really

like your work!" I said, "Yeah, thanks, it's not

really poetry..." to which he replied, "Yeah, but it's

not not poetry."

— Little Nuts (Brass Tacks Press, 2008)

== Painting ==
Using traditional canvases—as well as the fronts of postcards, hotel stationery and small pieces of paper—Marin paints with acrylic pens to produce contemporary, multi-colored abstracts, portraits, and landscapes. His work has been shown in galleries, and collected by celebrity inventor Ron Popeil among others. He cites as influences artists who "address the fragmentedness of modern existence," such Pablo Picasso, Wassily Kandinsky, Jackson Pollock, David Hockney, Jean-Michel Basquiat and, most notably, Paul Klee.

Marin's image entitled "Riven Rock" is now a wine label for Chardonnay and Cabernet Sauvignon wine being sold under a private label of the same name at the grocery chain Whole Foods Market.

Marin's apartment has been dubbed "The Palisades Art House" because of the thousands of paintings that crowd its walls, shelves, and floor. He hosts private tours to showcase his apartment as an art piece in itself.

Marin's art hangs in many famous restaurants in the downtown Los Angeles area like Bestia.

His art is handled by bG Gallery, Daniel Rolnik Gallery, and the Blooming Art Gallery. Additionally, it is on display at several Malibu businesses including SunLife Organics, Vitamin Barn, D’Amores Pizza, Kaishin, Malibu Farm and Pacific Coast Greens.

== Bibliography ==
=== Poetry Books ===
- A Friend of Beethoven (2020)
- The Night We Spilled Wine on Everything (2019)
- A Gentler Way of Falling (2018)
- Immigrant Hands (2018)
- The Alden Marin Songbook (2017)
- Vietnamese New Formalism (2017)
- This Town Needs a Rooster (2017)
- A Deal with the Crows (2016)
- A Perfect Night for Ba (2016)
- Jaywalking with the Baby (2015)
- I Come from a Surf Town (2015)
- A Way into Now (2014)
- The Consequence of Choices (2013)
- The Safety of Randomness (2012)
- The Problem with Oxnard (with Enrique Gonzales, 2012)
- Anecdotal Dinners (2012)
- While You Say "Ah!" (2011)
- The Wild Side on the Inside (2011)
- Letters to Red Leaves (2010)
- Skanzohero (2010)
- Everybody's in Love (2009)
- Let's Face It!: Selected Poems 1974-2009 (2009)
- Poems for Eric and the Wooden Lady (2009)
- Pennies in the Parking Meter (2009)
- Little Nuts (2008)
- Mittellegi (2008)
- Knee Driving (2008)
- Herzog's Pig (2008)
- Garden Variety Self-Obsession (2007)
- Write Everything (2007)
- Days without Hours (2006)
- Four Decades (2006)
- Illusions of Sweetness (2005)
- Asparagus on Toast (2005)
- Counting to 1000 (2005)
- Paddling to Misto (2005)

=== Art Books ===
- Leaf Faces #9 (2019)
- Leaf Faces #8 (2018)
- Leaf Faces #7 (2018)
- Leaf Faces #6 (2018)
- Leaf Faces #5 (2017)
- Leaf Faces #4 (2017)
- Leaf Faces #3 (2017)
- Leaf Faces #2 (2016)
- Leaf Faces #1 (2016)
- Animals of the Imagination (2015)
- The Art of Alden Marin (2014)
