= Forever (Kenny Loggins song) =

Single by Kenny Loggins

from the album Vox Humana
- B-side: "At Last"
- Released: May 12, 1985
- Recorded: 1985
- Genre: Pop rock
- Length: 4:23
- Label: Columbia
- Songwriters: Kenny Loggins; David Foster; Eva Ein
- Producers: Kenny Loggins; David Foster

Kenny Loggins singles chronology
"Vox Humana" (1985)	"Forever" (1985)	"At Last" (1986)

Music video
- "Forever" on YouTube

"Forever" is a song by Kenny Loggins from his 1985 album, Vox Humana. The song was written by Eva Ein and its producers Loggins and David Foster. It was released as the second single on May 12, 1985 by Columbia Records from the album, after "Vox Humana", and became another top 40 hit on the Billboard Hot 100 for Loggins. The song was originally written for a short film called Access All Areas produced by Jenny Sullivan (ex-wife of Jim Messina, Loggins' former bandmate in Loggins and Messina). Some of its success on the charts can be attributed to its use in the soap opera, The Young and the Restless. Loggins has often used the song to close out his live performances.

== Charts ==
Chart (1985–1986)	Peak position
Canada Adult Contemporary (RPM)	1
US Billboard Hot 100	40
US Adult Contemporary (Billboard)	5

== Credits and personnel ==
Credits adapted from the album's liner notes.

- Kenny Loggins – vocals
- David Foster – keyboards
- Steve Wood – keyboards
- Buzz Feiten – guitars
- Steve Lukather – guitar solo
- Nathan East – bass
- Tris Imboden – drums
