= Night Watch (1928 film) =

1928 film by Alexander Korda

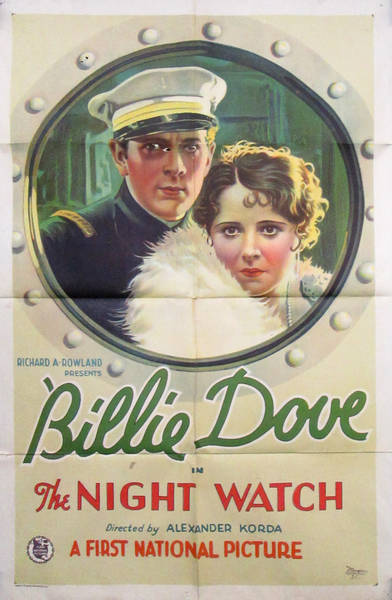
- Film poster
- Directed by: Alexander Korda
- Written by: Lajos Bíró (continuity); Dwinelle Benthall (titles); Rufus McCosh (titles)
- Based on: In the Night Watch; 1921 play by Michael Morton; Veille d'Armes; 1917 play by Claude Farrère and Lucien Nepoty
- Produced by: Ned Marin
- Starring: Billie Dove; Paul Lukas; Donald Reed; Nicholas Soussanin
- Cinematography: Karl Struss
- Edited by: George McGuire
- Music by: Emil Bierman; Mortimer Wilson
- Production company: First National Pictures
- Distributed by: First National Pictures; Warner Bros. Pictures
- Release date: September 9, 1928 (US)
- Running time: 72 minutes
- Country: United States
- Languages: Sound (Synchronized); English Intertitles

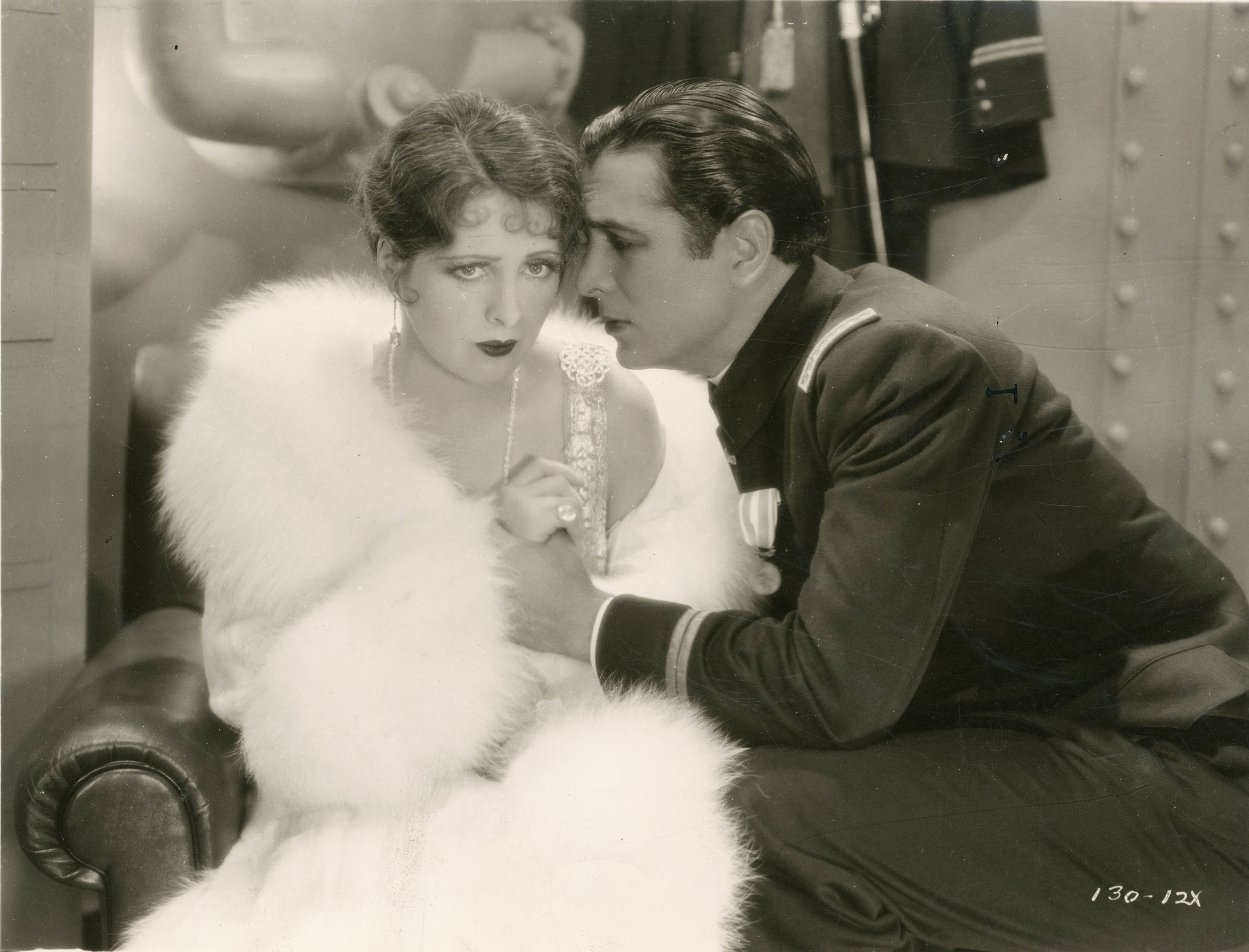

Night Watch is a 1928 American synchronized sound drama film directed by Alexander Korda and starring Billie Dove, Paul Lukas and Donald Reed. While the film has no audible dialog, it was released with a synchronized musical score with sound effects using the sound-on-disc Vitaphone process. The film was an adaptation of the dramatic 1921 play In the Night Watch, written by Michael Morton. The film is set almost entirely on a French warship at the beginning of the First World War. Night Watch was the first of Korda's films to feature sound.

== Plot ==
The story begins on the night of August 1, 1914, aboard the Alma, a French scouting cruiser docked in the harbor of Toulon. Captain de Corlaix, the ship's commander, hosts a farewell dinner with his officers and his wife, Yvonne, before the ship is placed on wartime alert. Though deeply devoted to his wife, Corlaix entrusts her safety to his subordinate, Lieutenant George d'Artelle, her former childhood sweetheart, while he attends to urgent duties.

During the evening, d’Artelle attempts to rekindle their past relationship, imploring Yvonne to give him the remaining hour of her time aboard the ship, alone in his cabin. Yvonne rejects his advances, affirming her love for her husband. However, Lieutenant Brambourg, who has long harbored feelings for Yvonne and suspects an affair, also approaches her with the same request. She responds to him with indignation and reproach.

Two launches are scheduled to depart the Alma: one at 10:00 p.m. and another at 11:00 p.m. Yvonne is expected to take the earlier boat unless she chooses to remain aboard. Meanwhile, Captain Corlaix receives an urgent wireless order for mobilization and action. He conceals from Yvonne the fact that the 11:00 boat will not depart, and urges her to leave on the 10:00 boat instead.

Instead of disembarking, Yvonne goes to d’Artelle's cabin, still emotionally conflicted. Though she is momentarily vulnerable, repeated interruptions prevent anything compromising from occurring. Brambourg bursts in to report that an unidentified vessel, flying what appear to be French naval lights, is approaching. He and d'Artelle leave to investigate. D’Artelle returns briefly to make one final appeal to Yvonne, but she rejects him once and for all, moved by a renewed sense of duty to her husband and to France.

Soon after, a torpedo strikes the Alma, wounding both Corlaix and d’Artelle. Amid the chaos, d’Artelle orders his servant to save Yvonne. The Alma fires a final broadside, sinking the enemy vessel before succumbing to the sea herself. D’Artelle, mortally wounded, straps a life preserver to Captain Corlaix in a final act of loyalty.

A court-martial convenes to determine whether Corlaix is guilty of negligence or desertion in the loss of his ship. Only four individuals survive the sinking: Corlaix, Yvonne, Brambourg, and d’Artelle's servant. The case turns on whether the enemy ship had been flying French identification lights, as Corlaix testifies. Brambourg, out of jealousy and resentment, claims the opposite.

To protect her husband's military reputation, Yvonne testifies that she saw the enemy ship from d’Artelle's cabin and confirms that it was displaying French lights. Her testimony is truthful—but in offering it, she must publicly acknowledge that she was alone in another man's cabin late at night. As a married woman, this confession brings dishonor upon her own name, even as it restores her husband's.

D’Artelle's servant corroborates her statement, and the court exonerates Captain Corlaix. In the aftermath, Corlaix comes to understand the full extent of Yvonne's sacrifice and, reassured by her honesty and devotion, is convinced that both his military and personal honor have been preserved.

== Cast ==
- Billie Dove as Yvonne Corlaix
- Paul Lukas as Captain Corlaix
- Donald Reed as Lieutenant D'Artelle
- Nicholas Soussanin as Officer Brambourg
- Nicholas Bela as Leduc
- George Periolat as Fargasson
- William H. Tooker as Mobrayne
- Gusztáv Pártos as Dagorne
- Anita Garvin as Ann

== Music ==
The theme song for this film was entitled "Yvonne" and was composed by Mortimer Wilson.

== Preservation status ==
A print of Night Watch is preserved at Cineteca Italiana in Milan.

== See also ==
- List of early sound feature films (1926–1929)
