= The Painted Angel =

1929 film

- Directed by: Millard Webb
- Written by: Forrest Halsey
- Based on: "Give This Little Girl a Hand" by Fannie Hearst
- Starring: Billie Dove
- Cinematography: John F. Seitz
- Edited by: Harold Young
- Music by: Alois Reiser
- Production company: First National Pictures
- Distributed by: Warner Bros. Pictures
- Release date: December 1, 1929
- Running time: 68 minutes
- Country: United States
- Language: English

The Painted Angel (also known as The Broadway Hostess) is a 1929 American pre-Code musical film directed by Millard Webb and starring Billie Dove and Edmund Lowe. Adapted for the screen by Forrest Halsey, the film was based on a short story by Fannie Hurst titled "Give This Little Girl a Hand," which originally appeared in Hearst's International-Cosmopolitan in 1928. The film is known as La favorita di Broadway in Italy. The tagline used to advertise the film was: Do you want to know the Truth about Night Club Hostesses?

== Plot ==
Mamie Hudler, a nightclub entertainer in San Francisco, narrowly escapes death when she refuses the unwanted attentions of Oldfield. Her devoted violinist and manager, Brood, heroically takes a bullet meant for her, injuring his arm and ending his violin career.

Mamie reinvents herself as Rodeo West and moves to New York, where she rises to become the queen of the nightclubs. Brood, now her manager, keeps a close watch on her finances, safeguarding her earnings from her scheming family—her mother Ma Hudler, father Pa Hudler, her brother Jule, and his wife Sippie. Many conflicts erupt over their attempts to spend Rodeo's money recklessly.

After a fierce confrontation with her family, Brood threatens to quit, but Rodeo persuades him to stay by reaffirming their bond. One evening at the club, Oldfield returns, now wealthy from striking oil. Brood instinctively reaches for his gun, but Rodeo stops him. She warms up to Oldfield and even performs for him before they leave together in his luxurious car.

Oldfield later forcefully enters Rodeo's dressing room, but just as Brood prepares to intervene, Oldfield surprises everyone by proposing marriage. Brood quietly exits without being noticed. Rodeo asks for time to consider the proposal and immediately confides in Brood about her sudden good fortune. Brood congratulates her, but Rodeo, frustrated by what she perceives as his coldness, lashes out. Brood then admits he has loved her since the day he saved her life.

As Brood prepares to leave the café, Rodeo, dressed in a bridal costume for her next number, runs after him and kisses him in front of Oldfield and the assembled guests. She announces that this will be a “real” bridal number. Oldfield graciously congratulates Brood, while Ma Hudler faints. The orchestra strikes up the wedding march as everyone celebrates the couple's union.

== Cast ==
- Billie Dove as Mamie Hudler / Rodeo West
- Edmund Lowe as "Brood"
- George MacFarlane as Oldfield
- Cissy Fitzgerald as Ma Hudler
- J. Farrell MacDonald as Pa Hudler
- Norman Selby as Jule
- Nellie Bly Baker as Sippie
- Will Stanton as Joe
- Douglas Gerrard as Sir Harry
- Shep Camp as Mac
- Peter Higgins as Singer
- Red Stanley as Dancer

== Songs ==
- Help Yourself To My Love

Music by M.K. Jerome
Lyrics by Herman Ruby

- Bride Without A Groom

Music by M.K. Jerome
Lyrics by Herman Ruby

- Only The Girl

Music by M.K. Jerome
Lyrics by Herman Ruby

- Everybody's Darling

Music by M.K. Jerome
Lyrics by Herman Ruby

- That Thing

Music by M.K. Jerome
Lyrics by Herman Ruby

== Preservation ==
The Painted Angel is currently presumed lost. In February of 2021, the film was cited by the National Film Preservation Board on their Lost U.S. Silent Feature Films list. However, the UCLA Film and Television Archive holds seven of the original Vitaphone soundtrack discs for the film. The musical trailer for the film was sung in its entirety by Billie Dove and the other members of the cast.

== See also ==
- List of early sound feature films (1926–1929)
