= Macha Rolnikas =

Lithuanian writer and Holocaust survivor (1927–2016)

Macha Rolnikas, also Maria Rolnikaite and Masha Rolnik (21 July 1927, in Vilnius - 7 April 2016, in Saint Petersburg) was a Lithuanian writer and Holocaust survivor. Rolnikas' family were Jewish and prominent in the local community, and when the Wehrmacht took control of Lithuania in 1941, her father joined the underground resistance. Rolnikas and the remainder of her family were sent to the Vilna Ghetto, and subsequently moved to Stutthof concentration camp for employment as an undertaker. As a result of her "employment", she survived in the camp until the Red Army liberated Stutthof in 1944. She was reunited in Vilnius with her older sister and father; her younger siblings and mother were most probably killed in Paneriai after the liquidation of the Vilna Ghetto. Following the end of the war, Rolnikas moved to the Soviet Union, first to study at the Maxim Gorky Literature Institute, and later to Leningrad after she was married. Her concentration camp diary was later adapted into a book, I Must Tell, that was published in the USSR in 1964 in Yiddish, Hebrew and Lithuanian, and in Paris in French in 1966. Translated into English by Daniel H. Shubin.
