= Rolnick =

Rolnick is a surname. Notable people with the surname include:

- Harry Rolnick, American author, editor, and music critic
- Neil Rolnick (born 1947), American composer and educator

== See also ==
- Rolnick Observatory, astronomical observatory in Westport, Connecticut
