= Daniel Rolnik =

Daniel Rolnik (born March 15, 1989) is a Los Angeles-based art critic and former gallerist.

== Life and career ==
Rolnik was studying audio engineering in college when he decided that he'd like to interview some of his favorite artists for his blog. Despite having no background in art, he soon began reviewing art for publications like LA Weekly, Artfetch, The Jewish Journal, A&O, Beautiful/Decay, Hi Fructose, and CARTWHEEL. He billed himself as "The World's Most Adorable Art Critic."

In 2014, Rolnik opened the Daniel Rolnik Gallery in Santa Monica, CA. In 2016, the gallery moved to 2675 S. La Cienega Blvd. in Culver City, California. Exhibitions like "Pacific Stoner Time," "The Fake History of the World, and "Art Basil" earned the gallery a reputation for satire, and for mixing fine art, street art, and lowbrow art. Juxtapoz wrote of one opening, "Friday's show had paper towel rolls dispensing penis drawings, bags of fake cocaine, and a zine of nude selfies. There was also traditional media paintings and drawings but all still tongue 'n cheek."

The Los Angeles Times called the Daniel Rolnik Gallery "a gallery with a sense of humor." However, a brief feud erupted on Twitter with New York–based celebrity art critic Jerry Saltz in 2015 after he called the gallery's art "stupid." (A motto of the gallery is "stupid art for smart people.")

Rolnik favors art with a handmade process. He is dismissive of media like digital prints. He frequently takes month-long road trips across the United States to find artists for his shows, visiting their studios and staying with them.
