= The Best: Sittin' in Again =

The Best: Sittin' In Again

Greatest hits album by Loggins and Messina
- Released: May 24, 2005
- Genre: Rock
- Length: 1:17:05
- Label: Columbia/Legacy

Loggins and Messina chronology
The Best of Loggins & Messina (1980)	The Best: Sittin' In Again (2005)	Live: Sittin' In Again at the Santa Barbara Bowl (2005)

Professional ratings
Review scores
Source	Rating
Allmusic	4.5/5 stars

The Best: Sittin' In Again is a greatest hits album by American singer-songwriter duo Loggins and Messina, released on May 24, 2005. This release was timed to preview the duo's subsequent reunion tour. It contains most of their hit singles and provides a retrospective view of their music from 1971 to 1974. The 18 tracks appearing on the collection were personally selected by Loggins and Messina. Six of the tracks are from their debut album Sittin' In, six are from their sophomore album Loggins and Messina, four are off their third album Full Sail, and two are featured on their fourth album Mother Lode. No tracks from either of their last two studio albums (So Fine, Native Sons) are included.

This compilation CD received some mixed reviews, however, because its emphasis was on songs performed on the duo's reunion tour, rather than a familiar "greatest hits" album. As such, some classic hits that were not performed, like "Thinking Of You" and "My Music", are also excluded from the CD.

== Track listing ==
1. "Watching the River Run" (Kenny Loggins, Jim Messina) – 3:28
2. "Travelin' Blues" (Messina) – 3:43
3. "Your Mama Don't Dance" (Loggins, Messina) – 2:49
4. "Be Free" (Messina) – 6:59
5. "Till The Ends Meet" (Loggins) – 3:09
6. "Nobody But You" (Messina) – 3:00
7. "House at Pooh Corner" (Loggins) – 4:24
8. "A Love Song" (Loggins, Dona Lyn George) – 3:12
9. "Danny's Song" (Loggins) – 4:16
10. "Long Tail Cat" (Loggins) – 3:49
11. "Just Before the News" (Messina) – 1:11
12. "Listen to a Country Song" (Messina, Al Garth) – 2:49
13. "Good Friend" (Messina) – 4:05
14. "Same Old Wine" (Messina) – 8:17
15. "Changes" (Messina) – 3:50
16. "Angry Eyes" (Loggins, Messina) – 7:42
17. "Sailin' The Wind" (Loggins) – 6:10
18. "Vahevala" (Daniel Loggins, Dann Lottermoser) – 4:46

== Musical credits ==
- Kenny Loggins – vocals, rhythm guitar, harmonica, acoustic guitar
- Jim Messina – vocals, lead guitar, mandolin, acoustic guitar, dobro
- Merel Bregante – drums, backing vocals
- Chris Brooks – koto
- Vince Charles – steel drums
- Jon Clarke – tenor saxophone, baritone saxophone, soprano saxophone, bass clarinet, flute, oboe, English horn, recorder, alto flute, bass flute, steel drums
- Victor Feldman – percussion
- Al Garth – violin, tenor saxophone, alto saxophone, flute, steel drums, recorder, bass clarinet
- Milt Holland – percussion
- Michael Omartian – Hammond organ, piano, concertina, Hohner clavinet, steel drums, tack piano, Wurlitzer electric piano, harmonium
- Don Roberts – tenor saxophone, flute, bass flute, soprano saxophone, alto flute, alto saxophone, bass clarinet
- Larry Sims – bass, backing vocals
- David Wallace – synthesizer

== Production ==
- Original session producer: Jim Messina
- Compilation producer: Jeff Magid
- Engineers: Alex Kazanegras, George Beauregard, Jim Messina, Corey Bailey, John Fiore
- Mastering: Bernie Grundman
- Photography: Ed Caraeff, Suzen Carson, Bruce Ditchfield, Urve Kuusik, Sandy Speiser, Tyler Thornton
- Cover photo: Marsha Reed
- Liner notes: David Wild
