= The House at Pooh Corner =

1928 book by A. A. Milne

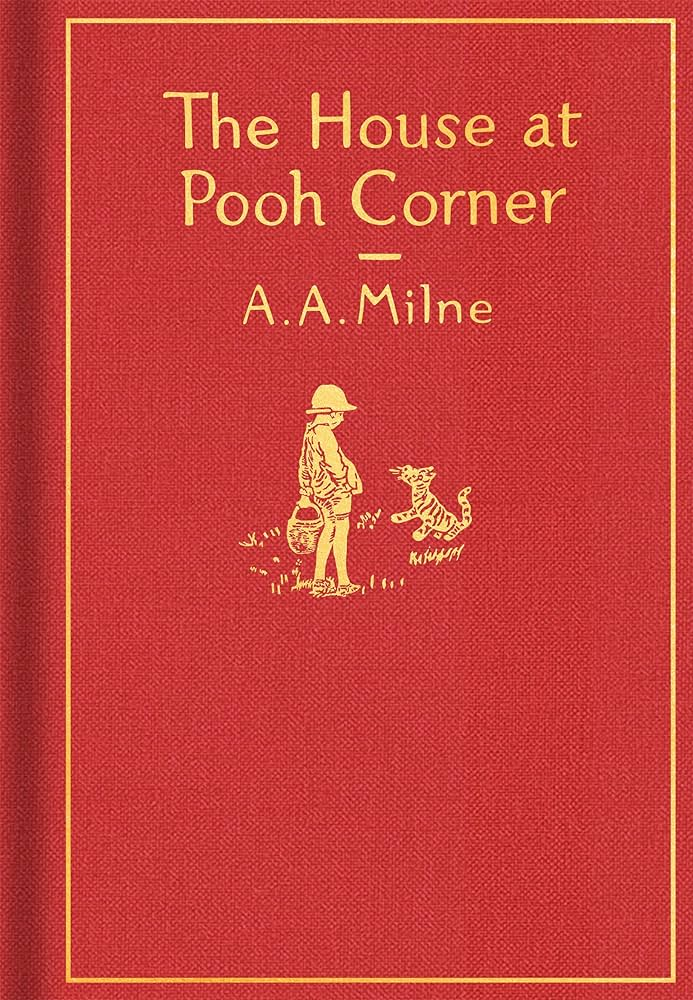
- First edition
- Author: A. A. Milne
- Illustrator: E. H. Shepard
- Language: English
- Genre: Children's novel
- Publisher: Methuen & Co. Ltd. (London)
- Publication date: 1928
- Publication place: United Kingdom
- Media type: Print (hardback & paperback)
- Preceded by: Winnie-the-Pooh
- Text: The House at Pooh Corner at Wikisource

The House at Pooh Corner is a 1928 children's book by A. A. Milne and illustrated by E. H. Shepard. This book is the second novel, and final one by Milne, to feature Winnie-the-Pooh and his world. The book is also notable for introducing the character Tigger.

== Background ==
Between the release of the 1926 Winnie-the-Pooh and this novel, Milne and Shepard released Now We Are Six. The release comprised a collection of poems, including some that featured the Pooh characters. While writing this novel, Milne decided that he wanted to end the series as Christopher Robin Milne was getting older.

The House at Pooh Corner entered the public domain in the United States in 2024. British copyright of the text expires on 1 January 2027 (70 calendar years after Milne's death) while British copyright of the illustrations expires on 1 January 2047 (70 calendar years after Shepard's death).

== Stories ==
Note: The first introduction of Tigger is in Chapter 2.

1. "In Which a House is Built at Pooh Corner for Eeyore"
  - During a snowy day, Pooh and Piglet attempt to construct a house for Eeyore in an area they name "Pooh Corner", using sticks they found from the other side of the Hundred Acre Wood. Unbeknownst to Pooh and Piglet, Eeyore had already collected those sticks for the same purpose. After Eeyore discovers the disappearance of his stick pile, he visits Christopher Robin, who agrees to help him search for the sticks. The two meet with Pooh and Piglet, who realise their oversight but show the house to Eeyore anyway. Ultimately, Eeyore believes that the wind blew the sticks to Pooh Corner as a house, and Pooh and Piglet leave to have lunch with Christopher Robin.
2. "In Which Tigger Comes to the Forest and Has Breakfast"
  - One night, Pooh hears a mysterious sound outside his house. Upon investigation, Pooh discovers that a new animal named Tigger has come to the forest. Tigger stays the night upon Pooh's invitation. In the morning, the two share breakfast but discover that Tigger hates Pooh's honey. They then visit Piglet and Eeyore but neither of them has any food that Tigger likes. Per Christopher Robin's suggestion, they go to Kanga and Roo's where Tigger discovers that he likes an extract of malt. Kanga and Roo then invite Tigger to live with them.
3. "In Which a Search Is Organized, and Piglet Nearly Meets the Heffalump Again"
  - Rabbit's relation, Small, has disappeared, so Rabbit organizes a search party. As the search happens, Pooh and Piglet fall into a pit, where they discuss the possibility of meeting a Heffalump. Eventually, Christopher Robin helps them to climb out and Piglet notices that Small was on Pooh's back, ending the search.
4. "In Which It Is Shown That Tiggers Don't Climb Trees"
  - Tigger and Roo explore the forest together during which the former brags to the latter about his skills. Upon reaching a tall tree, Tigger, with Roo on his back, climbs up it. However, upon realising how high up they are, Tigger becomes scared and is unable to climb down. Tigger and Roo are soon found by Pooh, Piglet, Christopher Robin, and Eeyore, who all help the two get down using Christopher Robin's extended tunic for Tigger and Roo to jump into.
5. "In Which Rabbit Has a Busy Day, and We Learn What Christopher Robin Does in the Mornings"
  - While trying to visit Christopher Robin, Rabbit discovers that he is gone and has left behind a note. Rabbit shows the note to Owl, who concludes from the note's words that Christopher Robin is spending time with a "Backson". Rabbit then visits Pooh and the two wonder what Christopher Robin does during the morning. Meanwhile, Piglet decides to give Eeyore a bouquet of violets. Piglet and Rabbit both find Eeyore, who reveals that Christopher Robin does education during the mornings.
6. "In Which Pooh Invents a New Game and Eeyore Joins In"
  - Pooh has invented a new game called "Poohsticks". The game involves dropping sticks on one side of the bridge and seeing which stick comes across first. One day, Pooh plays Poohsticks with Piglet, Rabbit, and Roo when they find Eeyore drifting out from under the bridge. After the group helps get Eeyore out of the water, the donkey explains that somebody had bounced him in. The friends accuse Tigger of causing this, but he quickly denies it. Christopher Robin comes along during the argument and breaks it up by suggesting that everyone play Poohsticks together. Eeyore wins the most games despite being a first-time player and he and Tigger reconcile.
7. "In Which Tigger Is Unbounced"
  - Annoyed by Tigger's bouncing, Rabbit, along with Pooh and Piglet, concocts a scheme to get Tigger to stop bouncing. Rabbit plans to take Tigger deep into the forest and lose him there, so that he will then be sad and quiet and stop bouncing. However, Tigger finds his way out while Rabbit, Pooh, and Piglet are lost instead. With Christopher Robin's help, Tigger sets out to find the trio. Meanwhile, Rabbit separates from Pooh and Piglet due to a disagreement on how to escape. After spending a long time waiting for Rabbit's return, Pooh and Piglet meet Christopher Robin who takes them back home. While the three spend time together, Tigger finds a humbled Rabbit, who is glad to be rescued.
8. "In Which Piglet Does a Very Grand Thing"
  - On a very windy day, Piglet and Pooh visit Owl. During their stay, Owl's tree house gets blown over by the wind, trapping the trio inside. In a moment of bravery, Piglet finds a way to escape through a tiny crevice before leaving to find Christopher Robin who will help get Pooh and Owl out.
9. "In Which Eeyore Finds the Wolery, and Owl Moves into It"
  - Due to his house falling over, Owl needs to find a new home and he solicits the help of the other animals in the forest. Eeyore, who had not been informed about Owl's house falling, takes it upon himself to find a suitable home for Owl. As everyone in the Hundred Acre woods helps salvage Owl's furniture, Eeyore announces that he has found a perfect house for Owl to live in; the house he found is actually Piglet's, but Piglet willingly gives it up. After this, Pooh offers to have Piglet move in with him, and Piglet gladly accepts.
10. "In Which Christopher Robin and Pooh Come to an Enchanted Place, and We Leave Them There"
  - Christopher Robin has to leave the forest, so all of the animals sign a poem that Eeyore has written. Upon taking it to Christopher Robin he begins to read it, and as he does each animal leaves little by little until just Pooh remains. The two go off to the Enchanted Place in the forest where Christopher Robin "knights" Pooh as Sir Pooh de Bear. Christopher Robin then explains that he has to leave and he cannot do just "nothing" anymore, but he hopes that Pooh will come and sit in the Enchanted Place even when he has gone. Pooh promises, and the two then go off together to do something.

== Reception ==
The Calgary Herald gave the book a positive review, noting its continued success at capturing the same energy as the first as well as its opportunity as a Christmas gift. The Rhode Island Evening Tribune stated that the stories were "highly imaginative" ones and they "sincerely recommended" the novel. The St. Joseph Gazette also gave a positive review, claiming that "Mr. Milne and E. H. Shepard have done it again!". However, the publication did give a negative remark by stating that the book's place as the final Pooh story was "unsatisfactory". Others echoed this sentiment including The Sydney Mail who felt that Milne and Shepard should continue writing Pooh stories.

== Adaptations ==
=== Musical recordings ===
In 1968 Jefferson Airplane referenced the book in their song "The House at Pooneil Corners", a surrealistic depiction of global nuclear war co-written by Paul Kantner and Marty Balin, ending with the line "Which is why a Pooh is poohing in the sun."

In 1970, singer-songwriter Kenny Loggins penned a song using the book's name for the Nitty Gritty Dirt Band on their album Uncle Charlie & His Dog Teddy. In 1971, Loggins would record the song with Jim Messina as part of Loggins and Messina for their 1971 album, Sittin' In. Loggins wrote the song when he was seventeen when reflecting upon his high school graduation. The song is told from the perspective of both Winnie-the-Pooh and Christopher Robin. The song uses verses and allusions to the book as allegorical musings on the loss of innocence and childhood and the nostalgia for simpler, happier times. The first verse, told from Pooh's point of view, describes how he and Christopher's days together "disappeared all too soon" and how he "hates to find [his] way back to the Wood."

In 1994, Loggins re-released the song as "Return to Pooh Corner" on the album of the same name. This version featured a new verse reflecting upon Loggins' own experiences as a father. The added third verse is told from the perspective of an adult Christopher Robin who gives Winnie-the-Pooh to his own son and hears Pooh whisper to him, "welcome home." The song features backing vocals from Amy Grant. Loggins would later invoke the book's title again in 2000 with More Songs from Pooh Corner.

=== Audio recordings ===
In 1960, a recording was released by His Master's Voice, a dramatised version with songs (music by Harold Fraser-Simson) of two chapters from the book (2 and 8), starring Ian Carmichael as Pooh, Denise Bryer as Christopher Robin, Hugh Lloyd as Tigger, Penny Morrell as Piglet, Terry Norris as Eeyore, Rosemary Adam as Kanga, Tom Chatto as Rabbit, and Rex Garner as Owl. This was released on a 45 rpm EP.

In 1988, an audio version of the book, published by BBC Enterprises, was narrated by Alan Bennett.

In 1997 Hodder Children's Audio released a dramatisation of the book with Stephen Fry as Pooh, Sandi Toksvig as Tigger, Jane Horrocks as Piglet, Geoffrey Palmer as Eeyore, Judi Dench as Kanga, Finty Williams as Roo, Robert Daws as Rabbit, Michael Williams as Owl, Steven Webb as Christopher Robin, and narrated by Judi Dench and Michael Williams. The music was composed and played by John Gould, and directed by David Benedictus.

=== Disney animation ===
In 1968, chapters 2, 8, and 9 were adapted for the Disney featurette Winnie the Pooh and the Blustery Day. For 1974's Winnie the Pooh and Tigger Too!, chapters 4 and 7 were adapted. The book's final chapter served as the basis for the epilogue to The Many Adventures of Winnie the Pooh and later 1997's direct-to-video movie Pooh's Grand Adventure: The Search for Christopher Robin. Winnie the Pooh and a Day for Eeyore would later adapt chapter 6 from both this novel and the 1926 original. Segments of Piglet's Big Movie would use chapters 1 and 3 as source material. Chapter 5 was adapted into the 2011 animated Winnie the Pooh. The 2018 live-action film Christopher Robin acts as an unofficial sequel to the book, with the film focusing on a grown-up Christopher Robin meeting Pooh for the first time since going to boarding school, while the film's first scenes adapt the last chapter of the book. Producer Brigham Taylor was inspired by the book's last chapter for the film's story.

Chapter 8 was partially adapted into an episode of 1988's The New Adventures of Winnie the Pooh (entitled "The Masked Offender") where Owl's house falls down.
