= Finale (Loggins and Messina album) =

Live album by Loggins and Messina
- Released: January 1977
- Recorded: 1975–1976
- Genre: Rock
- Length: 77:22
- Label: Columbia
- Producer: Jim Messina

Loggins and Messina chronology
| Native Sons (1976) | Finale (1977) | The Best of Friends (1977) |

Finale is the second live double album (and eighth overall release) by singer-songwriter duo Loggins and Messina, released in early 1977. Tracks on the album are from performances while touring in 1975 and 1976.

The duo had parted by the time this album was released, and it was considered by some purely as a profit-taking move intended to see what money could be made before the pair faded from the public mind and in that light it can be considered a Columbia 'corporate' release, rather than one intended by artists Kenny Loggins or Jim Messina.

This was the last album by Kenny Loggins shortly before his first solo album, Celebrate Me Home, was released April 1977.

Professional ratings
Review scores
| Source | Rating |
|---|---|
| Allmusic | 1/5 stars |

== Track listing ==
=== Disc one ===
Side One

1. "Introduction" – 1:42
2. "Travelin' Blues" (Jim Messina) – 3:07
3. "Medley:" – 6:34
  - Danny's Song (Kenny Loggins)
  - A Love Song (Loggins, Donna Lyn George)
  - House at Pooh Corner (Loggins)
  - Thinking of You (Messina)
4. "Keep Me in Mind" (Messina) – 4:04
5. "Pretty Princess" (Messina, Murray MacLeod) – 6:40

Side Two

1. "Brighter Days" (Loggins, Donna Lyn George) – 3:39
2. "Be Free" (Messina) – 7:06
3. "Peacemaker" (Loggins, John Townsend, Ed Sanford) – 5:00
4. "Growin'" (Loggins, Ronnie Wilkins) – 2:43

=== Disc two ===
Side Three

1. "Motel Cowboy" (Loggins, Messina) – 2:57
2. "Country Medley:" – 7:26
  - Listen to a Country Song (Messina, Al Garth)
  - Oh Lonesome Me (Don Gibson)
  - I'm Movin' On (Hank Snow)
  - Listen to a Country Song (Reprise)"
3. "Oklahoma, Home of Mine" (Loggins, Messina) – 3:16
4. "Changes" (Messina) – 4:29

Side Four

1. "You Need a Man" (Messina) – 9:20
2. "Lately My Love" (Messina) – 3:37
3. "Rock & Roll Medley:" – 5:42
  - My Music (Loggins, Messina)
  - Splish Splash (Bobby Darin, Jean Murray)
  - Boogie Man (Messina)

== Personnel ==
- Kenny Loggins – vocals, rhythm guitar, acoustic guitar, harmonica
- Jim Messina – vocals, lead guitar, acoustic guitar, mandolin
- Merel Bregante – drums
- Jon Clarke – saxophone, flute, oboe
- Vince Denham – saxophone
- Steve Forman – percussion
- Richard Greene – violin
- George Hawkins – bass guitar and backing vocals on "Pretty Princess"
- Jack Lenz – flute, keyboards
- Doug Livingston – keyboards on "Pretty Princess"
- Willy Ornelas – drums on "Pretty Princess"
- Woody Paul – rhythm guitar on "Pretty Princess"
- Don Roberts – saxophone
- Larry Sims – bass guitar, vocals

== Charts ==
Album – Billboard (United States)

| Year | Chart | Position |
|---|---|---|
| 1977 | Pop Albums | 83 |
