= Live: Sittin' In Again at the Santa Barbara Bowl =

Live: Sittin' in Again at Santa Barbara Bowl

Live album by Loggins and Messina
- Released: November 15, 2005
- Recorded: July 8–9, 2005
- Genre: Rock
- Label: Rhino

Loggins and Messina chronology
| The Best: Sittin' In Again (2005) | Live: Sittin' in Again at Santa Barbara Bowl (2005) |

Live: Sittin' in Again at Santa Barbara Bowl is a live compilation album (and the eleventh overall release) by the singer-songwriter duo Loggins and Messina, released in late 2005. It was recorded in Santa Barbara during one of the first performances of their reunion tour. The physical CD features thirteen tracks; however an online download-only version includes five additional tracks: "Sailin' the Wind", "Long Tail Cat", "Thinking of You", "Be Free", and "You Need a Man" which can also be heard (and seen) on the DVD release of the concert.

Professional ratings
Review scores
| Source | Rating |
|---|---|
| Allmusic | 3/5 stars |

== Track listing ==
1. "Watching the River Run" (Kenny Loggins, Jim Messina) – 3:54
2. "House at Pooh Corner" (Loggins) – 4:16
3. "Listen to a Country Song/Holiday Hotel" (Messina, Al Garth) – 4:44
4. "Back to Georgia" (Loggins) – 3:19
5. "Trilogy: Lovin' Me/To Make a Woman Feel Wanted/Peace of Mind" (Loggins, Messina, Murray MacLeod) – 14:45
6. "Your Mama Don't Dance" (Loggins, Messina) – 3:38
7. "A Love Song" (Loggins, Donna Lyn George) – 2:23
8. "Same Old Wine" (Messina) – 8:02
9. "Changes" (Messina) – 5:17
10. "Vahevala" (Loggins, Dann Lottermoser) – 7:06
11. "Angry Eyes" (Loggins, Messina) – 7:54
12. "Nobody But You" (Messina) – 4:30
13. "Danny's Song" (Loggins) – 2:41

== DVD track listing ==
1. "Intro"
2. "Watching The River Run"
3. "House At Pooh Corner"
4. "Sailin' The Wind" (Loggins, Lottermoser)
5. "Long Tail Cat" (Loggins)
6. "Listen To A Country Song/Holiday Song"
7. "Changes"
8. "Back To Georgia"
9. "Trilogy: Lovin' Me/Make A Woman Feel Wanted/Peace of Mind"
10. "Your Mama Don't Dance"
11. "A Love Song"
12. "Thinking Of You" (Messina)
13. "Kind Woman" (Richie Furay)
14. "Be Free" (Messina)
15. "Same Old Wine"
16. "Growin'" (Loggins, Ronnie Wilkins)
17. "You Need A Man" (Messina)
18. "Vahevala"
19. "Angry Eyes"
20. "Nobody But You"
21. "Danny's Song"

=== Bonus tracks from The Midnight Special (1973) ===
1. "My Music" (Loggins, Messina)
2. "Danny's Song"
3. "Your Mama Don't Dance"
4. "You Need A Man"
5. "Coming To You" (Messina)
6. "Sailin' The Wind"

== Personnel ==
- Kenny Loggins – vocals, guitar
- Jim Messina – vocals, guitar, mandolin
- Steve DiStanislao – drums
- Gabe Dixon – keyboards
- Jeff Nathanson – saxophone, EWI
- Steve Nieves – percussion, saxophone
- Shem von Schroeck – bass guitar
- Gabe Witcher – fiddle, dobro

== Additional personnel on DVD bonus tracks ==
- Merel Bregante – drums
- Larry Sims – bass, backing vocals
- Al Garth – reed instruments, violin, recorder
- Jon Clarke – reed instruments

== Production ==
- Producers: Jim Messina, Kenny Loggins
- Product manager: Mike Engstrom
- Digital editing: Anthony Catalano
- Engineer: Guy Charbonneau, Elliot Scheiner
- Mastering: Darcy Proper
- Photography: Larry Mills, Greg Waterman
- Liner notes: Peter Fornatale
