= Picking Up the Pieces =

Picking Up the Pieces or Pickin' Up the Pieces may refer to:

== Film and television ==
- Picking Up the Pieces (film), a 2000 film directed by Alfonso Arau and starring Woody Allen
- Picking Up the Pieces, a 1985 television movie starring Margot Kidder
- Picking Up the Pieces (TV series), a 1998 British medical drama

== Music ==
- Picking Up the Pieces (Jewel album), 2015
- Picking Up the Pieces (Seventh Day Slumber album), 2003
- Pickin' Up the Pieces (Fitz and the Tantrums album), 2010
- Pickin' Up the Pieces (Poco album), 1969
  - "Pickin' Up the Pieces" (song), the title song
- "Picking Up the Pieces" (Difford & Tilbrook song), 1984
- "Picking Up the Pieces" (Paloma Faith song), 2012

== See also ==
- Pick Up the Pieces (disambiguation)
