= On Stage (Loggins and Messina album) =

Live album by Loggins and Messina
- Released: April 24, 1974
- Recorded: April 28–29, 1972 at Winterland, San Francisco, CA; March 4, 1973, Orpheum Theatre, Boston, MA; March 1-2, 1973, Carnegie Hall, New York, NY
- Genre: Rock
- Length: 82:53
- Label: Columbia
- Producer: Jim Messina

Loggins and Messina chronology
| Full Sail (1973) | On Stage (1974) | Mother Lode (1974) |

On Stage is the fourth album by singer-songwriter duo Loggins and Messina, released in 1974. As their first live album, it was released as a double album and featured a side-long version of their hit song "Vahevala".

Professional ratings
Review scores
| Source | Rating |
|---|---|
| Allmusic | 4/5 stars |

== Track listing ==
Sides shown are for the original dual-record vinyl released by Columbia records in 1974. The CD release is also a double-disc set; the first disc consists of sides No. 1 and No. 2, and the second contains sides No. 3 and No. 4.

=== Side #1 ===
1. "House at Pooh Corner" (Kenny Loggins) – 2:40 (lead singer: Kenny Loggins)
2. "Danny's Song" (Loggins) – 3:55 (lead singer: Kenny Loggins)
3. "You Could Break My Heart" (Loggins) – 3:06 (lead singer: Kenny Loggins)
4. "Lady of My Heart" (Loggins) – 1:50 (lead singer: Kenny Loggins)
5. "Long Tail Cat" (Loggins) – 3:23 (lead singer: Kenny Loggins)
6. "Listen to a Country Song" (Jim Messina, Al Garth) – 2:33 (lead singer: Jim Messina)
7. "Holiday Hotel" (Messina, Garth) – 2:08 (lead singer: Jim Messina)

=== Side #2 ===
1. "Just Before the News" (Messina) – 1:08 (instrumental)
2. "Angry Eyes" (Loggins, Messina) – 10:06 (lead singers: Kenny Loggins, Jim Messina)
3. "Golden Ribbons" (Messina) – 5:57 (lead singers: Jim Messina, Kenny Loggins, Larry Sims, Al Garth)
4. "Another Road" (Loggins) – 2:22 (lead singer: Kenny Loggins)

=== Side #3 ===
1. "Vahevala" (Dan Loggins, Dann Lottermoser) – 21:00 (lead singer: Kenny Loggins)

=== Side #4 ===
1. "Back to Georgia" (Loggins) – 2:59 (lead singer: Kenny Loggins)
2. "Trilogy – 12:12: Lovin' Me (Messina, Murray MacLeod) (lead singer: Jim Messina), To Make a Woman Feel Wanted (Loggins, Messina) (lead singers: Kenny Loggins, Jim Messina), Peace of Mind" (Messina) (lead singer: Kenny Loggins)
3. "Your Mama Don't Dance" (Loggins, Messina) – 3:02 (lead singers: Jim Messina, Kenny Loggins)
4. "Nobody But You" (Messina) – 4:32 (lead singer: Jim Messina)

== Personnel ==
- Kenny Loggins – vocals, rhythm guitar, acoustic guitar, harmonica
- Jim Messina – vocals, lead guitar, acoustic guitar, mandolin
- Merel Bregante – drums, backing vocals
- Jon Clarke – flute, tenor saxophone, baritone saxophone, percussion
- Al Garth – violin, tenor saxophone, recorder, alto saxophone, percussion
- Larry Sims – bass guitar, backing vocals

== Production ==
- Producer: Jim Messina
- Engineers: Alex Kazanegras and John Fiore
- Mastering: Vic Anesini
- Photography: Ed Caraeff, David Gahr, Bob Jenkins, Jim Marshall, Ellen Wolff, Frank Zinn, Jenny Messina
- Artwork: Ron Coro, Ron Jaramillo
- Graphic design: Rev. Richard White
- Liner notes: Ellen Wolff
- Recording locations: Winterland, San Francisco, April 28,29, 1972; Carnegie Hall, New York, March 1,2, 1973; Orpheum Theatre, Boston, March 4, 1973.

== Charts ==
Album – Billboard (United States)

| Year | Chart | Position |
|---|---|---|
| 1974 | Pop Albums | 5 |
| 1974 | Australia (Kent Music Report) | 97 |
