= The Best of Loggins & Messina =

Greatest hits album by Loggins and Messina
- Released: Jan 1980
- Genre: Rock
- Label: Embassy

Loggins and Messina chronology
The Best of Friends (1977)	The Best of Loggins & Messina (1980)	The Best: Sittin' In Again (2005)

Professional ratings
Review scores
Source	Rating
Allmusic	4.5/5 stars

The Best of Loggins & Messina is a compilation album by singer-songwriter duo Loggins and Messina, released in late 1980 in Britain and Europe by Embassy Records, an imprint of their usual European label CBS Records (see 1980 in music).

It consists of 14 of their later recordings and a few of their early hits. However, it omits some of their highest charting songs.

== Track listing ==
1. "Vahevala" – 4:45 (KL, DL)
2. "Danny's Song" – 4:14 (KL)
3. "Nobody But You" (JM)
4. "Whiskey" (KL)
5. "House at Pooh Corner" – 4:20 (KL)
6. "Angry Eyes" – 2:23 (KL, JM)
7. "Golden Ribbons" (JM)
8. "My Music" – 3:03 (KL, JM)
9. "Brighter Days" (KL)
10. "Watching the River Run" – 3:25 (KL, JM)
11. "Keep Me In Mind". (JM)
12. "Peacemaker" (KL, ES, JT)
13. "I'm Moving On"
14. "Til The Ends Meet" (KL)
15. ”Pathway to Glory”

== Songwriter credits ==
- KL – Kenny Loggins
- JM – Jim Messina
- ES – Ed Sanford
- JT – John Townsend
- DL – Dann Lottermoser

== Musical credits ==
- Kenny Loggins (vocals, background vocals, rhythm guitar, harmonica, acoustic guitar)
- Jim Messina (vocals, background vocals, lead guitar, mandolin, acoustic guitar, dobro)
- Murray MacCleod (vocals)
- Ed Sanford (vocals)*
- John Townsend (vocals)
- Merle Brigante (drums)
- Chris Brooks (koto)
- Jon Clarke (Horn)
- Vince Denham (Saxophone)
- Victor Feldman (percussion)
- Steve Forman (percussion)
- Al Garth (Violin, Horn)
- Richard Greene (violin)
- Milt Holland (percussion)
- Michael Omartian (Keyboards)
- David Paich (Keyboards)
- Marty Paich (strings)
- Mike Rubin (piano)
- Dan Roberts (Saxophone)
- Larry Sims (Bass)
- David Wallace (synthesizer)
