= Thinking of You (Loggins and Messina song) =

Loggins and Messina song

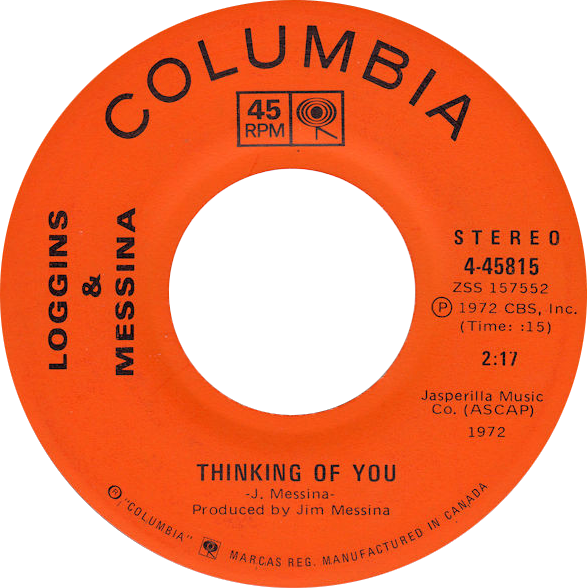
- Side A of the Canadian single

Single by Loggins and Messina

from the album Loggins and Messina
- B-side: "Till the Ends Meet"
- Released: March 1973
- Recorded: 1972 at Columbia Studios, Los Angeles
- Genre: Soft rock, folk rock
- Length: 2:18
- Label: Columbia
- Songwriter(s): Jim Messina
- Producer(s): Jim Messina

Loggins and Messina singles chronology
"Your Mama Don't Dance" (1972)	"Thinking of You" (1973)	"My Music" (1973)

Alternative release
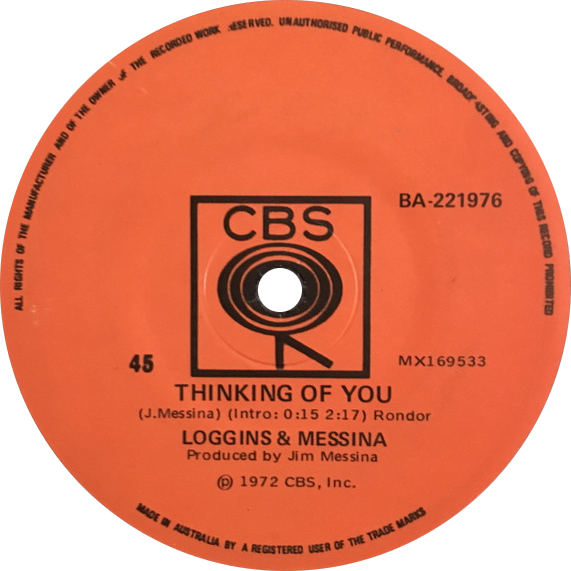
- Side A of the Australian single

"Thinking of You" is a song by American duo Loggins and Messina. It was released in 1973 as the second single from their second album, Loggins and Messina. The uptempo rendition released on the single is different from the somewhat more mellow LP mix.

"Thinking of You" reached number 18 on the U.S. Billboard Hot 100 and number 11 on the Cash Box Top 100. It reached number 20 in Canada.

The song was a bigger Adult Contemporary hit, reaching number seven in the U.S. and number 16 in Canada. The track speaks of the essence of partnership, and of the joy found while spending time in each other's company.

== Personnel ==
- Jim Messina – lead vocals, electric guitars
- Kenny Loggins – harmony vocals, classical acoustic guitar, harmonica
- Al Garth – fiddle, recorder(?)
- Jon Clarke – oboe, recorder(?)
- Larry Sims – bass, backing vocals
- Merel Bregante – brushed drums, possible backing vocals
- Michael Omartian – clavinet, Wurlitzer electric piano
- Milt Holland – castanets, temple blocks

It is unclear if it is Garth or Clarke who overdubbed the recorder.

== Chart performance ==
=== Weekly singles charts ===
Chart (1973)	Peak position
Australia (Kent Music Report)	65
Canadian Top Singles	20
Canadian RPM Adult Contemporary	16
U.S. Billboard Hot 100	18
U.S. Billboard Adult Contemporary	7
U.S. Cash Box Top 100	11

=== Year-end charts ===
Chart (1973)	Rank
U.S. Billboard	141
