= Vahevala =

1972 single by Loggins and Messina

"Vahevala" is a song that has been recorded by a multitude of artists over the years. It was originally a single by Loggins and Messina which became a hit for the duo in 1972.

== Background ==
The song was written by Dan Loggins and his friend Dann Lottermoser. It would have been a solo song for Kenny Loggins but Columbia Records head Clive Davis had his say about it and it was credited to the duo Loggins and Messina to continue their success. It appears on the duo's first album Sittin' In. The song is about a fictional island in Jamaica. According to a 1979 Radio & Record News review of a recording of the song by Sugar Cane, the song is an old favorite that keeps popping up from time to time under different guises.

There are differences on the spelling of the title. One example is by Sugar Cane who kept with the Jamaican tropical theme when they followed up their on hit "Montego Bay" with their version of this song, with the spelling of the title as "Valhevala".

== Loggins & Messina version ==
"Vahevala"

Song by Loggins and Messina.

from the album Sittin' In
- A-side: "Vahevala (Pronounced Va-Hee-Va-La)"
- B-side: "Same Old Wine"
- Length: 3:40
- Label: Columbia 4-45550
- Composer: D. Lottermoser - D. Loggins -
- Producer: Jim Messina

Dan Loggins who composed the song is the older brother of Kenny Loggins.

Creation

While the song was being created, Loggins wanted the Jamaican feel to come out. To get the right atmosphere on the final making of it in the studio, they used steel drums and recorders. And to emphasize the narrative by Loggins, reverb was added to the bridge vocals. For the steel drums, Tommy Reynolds of Hamilton, Joe Frank & Reynolds was brought in to help Jim Messina with capturing that feel. Messina knew that Reynolds had grown up in Jamaica. Reynolds said that they would need three drums including a lead drum to make it a full band. He made the drums for them and showed them how to play them. Messina told Reynolds that he thought Michael Omartian could handle it and from his memory, Omartian, "being the virtuoso he is, was able to pick up the sticks, and within a few hours, had it down." He also recalled that Omartian played lead and Jon Clarke and Al Garth played the other steel drums. The result was that the song was taken to a place that it wouldn't have been able to go otherwise.

=== Reception ===
The song was reviewed in the February 5 issue of Record World. The reviewer said that it was in essence a sea shanty type of song with the harmonies being of a CSN&Y flavor and that it couldn't help but grow on you (referring to radio DJs) and listeners.

The song was a Top 20 Spotlight in the February 12 issue of Billboard. Referring to it as a dynamite number, the reviewer said that it should prove to be a giant. It was also misspelled as Valevella.

=== Airplay ===
Canada

In Canada it was on the playlist of CKXL in Calgary for the week of April 22.

United States

The February 12 issue of Billboard noted that Bobby Cole of FM station, KSAN in San Francisco, California reported that Loggins & Messina cuts "Nobody But You" and "Vahevala" were seeing action. The following week the magazine noted that Ed Sciaky of WMMR-FM in Philadelphia had reported action on three songs from the Sittin' In album, "Nobody But You," "Vahevela", and "House at Pooh Corner". Also in the same issue Ron Berger of WHCN-FM in Hartford reported action on the album cuts "Trilogy", "Nobody But You", "Back To Georgia" and "Vahevela".

On the week of March 4, Billboard noted that Dex Bott of WLSU, (Louisiana State University) reported play on "Vahevela". Also in the same issue there was action on the cuts "Danny's Song," "Vahevela," "Lovin' Me," and "Back to Georgia" on stations WCBS-FM and WKTK-FM.

It was noted by Record World in the March 25 issue that the song was on the playlist of WCFL in Chicago, where it peaked at no. 3 on May 18.

=== Charts ===
It entered the Record World 101 150 Singles chart at no. 136 on the week of March 18, staying in the chart with the last entry of 107 on April 14 before debuting in the Singles chart (Top 100) the following week at no. 95. It peaked at no. 87 on the week of May 20 which was its final week in the chart.

On the week of March 18, the single made its debut at no. 113 in the Billboard Bubbling Under The Hot 100 chart. It stayed there until April 8 at no. 105. The following week it made its debut at no. 90 in the Hot 100. It peaked at no. 84 on the week of May 6 and held the position for another week. The following week it was back in the Bubbling Under the Hot 100 chart at no. 101, its last chart appearance.

On the week ending April 22, the song made its debut in the Cash Box Top 100 chart at no. 100. Having spent four weeks in the chart, it peaked at no. 83 on the week ending May 13.

== Album and performances ==
Album appearances and releases

The song appears Loggins & Messina's 1974 album On Stage which was released on Columbia PG 32848. It is one of the selected best tracks on their Best Of Friends album that was released on Columbia PC34388 in late 1974.

Venues

Loggins & Messina performed at the San Diego Sports Arena in December 1974 with musicians; Larry Sims on bass and harmony vocals; Merel Bregante on drums; Al Garth on violin, saxes, clarinet, recorders, percussion and vocals; Jon Clarke on saxes, flute, recorders, oboe and percussion; and Don Roberts on saxes, recorders and percussion. They went through a range of their songs and capped what was described by Cash Box as a perfect evening with "Vahevala" as their encore song. It featured solos from on Clarke on flute and Al Garth on violin.

Kenny Loggins as a solo artist performed the song at the Universal Amphitheatre in Los Angeles in September, 1979.
