= The Best of Friends (album) =

Compilation album by Loggins and Messina
- Released: Nov 1976
- Genre: Rock
- Length: 38:16
- Label: Columbia

Loggins and Messina chronology
Finale (1976)	The Best of Friends (1976)	The Best of Loggins & Messina (1980)

Professional ratings
Review scores
Source	Rating
Allmusic	4.5/5 stars
Christgau's Record Guide	C+

The Best of Friends is a compilation album (9th release) by singer-songwriter duo Loggins and Messina, released in late 1976.

It consists of 10 of their most popular and best loved songs in what is essentially a "greatest hits" LP. To promote the compilation's release, Columbia issued a single version of the album track 'Angry Eyes' in a truncated 2:23 version as opposed to its 7 minute length.

The CD release featured the same tracks as the original 1976 LP; "Angry Eyes" is still the shorter version and no additional tracks were added to fill the CD to the 80-minute limit.

== Track listing ==
Side one

1. "Angry Eyes" (Kenny Loggins, Jim Messina) – 2:23
2. "Be Free" (Messina) – 6:57
3. "Vahevala" (Daniel Loggins, Dann Lottermoser) – 4:45
4. "Peace of Mind" (Messina) – 4:04
5. "My Music" (Loggins, Messina) – 3:03

Side two

1. "Thinking of You" (Messina) – 2:18
2. "House at Pooh Corner" (Loggins) – 4:20
3. "Watching the River Run" (Loggins, Messina) – 3:25
4. "Danny's Song" (Loggins) – 4:14
5. "Your Mama Don't Dance" (Loggins, Messina) – 2:47

== Personnel ==
- Kenny Loggins – vocals, background vocals, rhythm guitar, acoustic guitar, harmonica
- Jim Messina – vocals, background vocals, lead guitar, acoustic guitar, mandolin, dobro
- Merel Bregante – drums, backing vocals
- Jon Clarke – flute, oboe, recorder, baritone, soprano & tenor saxophones, steel drum
- Victor Feldman – percussion
- Al Garth – fiddle, recorder, alto & tenor saxophones, steel drum
- Milt Holland – percussion
- Michael Omartian – organ, piano, keyboards, clavinet, concertina, steel drum
- David Paich – keyboards
- Larry Sims – bass, vocals, backing vocals

== Production ==
- Producer: Jim Messina
- Engineers: Alex Kazanegras, John Fiore
- Photography: Annie Leibovitz
- Design: Ken Anderson
- Liner notes: Kenny Loggins, Jim Messina

== Charts ==
Chart (1977)	Peak position
US Billboard Top LPs	61
