= House at Pooh Corner (song) =

1971 single by Nitty Gritty Dirt Band

Single by Nitty Gritty Dirt Band

from the album Uncle Charlie & His Dog Teddy
- B-side: "Travelin' Mood"
- Released: April 12, 1971
- Genre: Rock
- Length: 2:39
- Label: Liberty
- Songwriter: Kenny Loggins
- Producer: William McEuen

Nitty Gritty Dirt Band singles chronology
"Mr. Bojangles" (1970)	"House at Pooh Corner" (1971)	"Some of Shelly's Blues" (1971)

"House at Pooh Corner" is a song written by Kenny Loggins, based on the children's book of the same name. It was first performed by the Nitty Gritty Dirt Band on their 1970 album Uncle Charlie & His Dog Teddy.

== Background ==
It is told from the perspective of both Winnie-the-Pooh and Christopher Robin, and serves as an allegory for loss of innocence and nostalgia for childhood. Loggins was a 17-year-old senior in high school when he wrote the song.

Originally Disney would not allow Loggins to record the song, claiming copyright infringement. Through industry connections, Loggins arranged a meeting with Cardon Walker who was the then-executive VP of the Walt Disney Corporation; Loggins later sang the song at Walker's home in Glendale, prompting Disney to release the copyright.

=== Reception ===
Chart (1971)	Peak position
Canadian RPM Top Singles	30
New Zealand (Listener)	13
U.S. Billboard Hot 100	53
US Cash Box Top 100	38

== Loggins & Messina version ==
"House at Pooh Corner"

Song by Loggins and Messina

from the album Sittin' In
- Released: November 1971
- Recorded: Summer 1971
- Studio: Columbia Studios, Los Angeles, CA, US
- Genre: Rock, folk rock
- Length: 4:25
- Label: Columbia
- Songwriter: Kenny Loggins
- Producer: Jim Messina

The song was later recorded by Loggins and Messina themselves on their debut album Sittin' In, released in November 1971, 6 months after the single release of the Nitty Gritty Dirt Band version.

=== Personnel ===
- Kenny Loggins - lead vocals, classical acoustic guitar
- Jim Messina - harmony vocals, acoustic guitar
- Jon Clarke - oboe
- Al Garth - recorder
- Larry Sims - bass, backing vocals
- Merel Bregante - drums, backing vocals
- Michael Omartian - Moog synthesizer, Hammond organ, piano
- Milt Holland - shakers, temple blocks, congas, cabasa, gong

== Other notable versions ==
- In 1994, Loggins re-recorded the song (with an additional verse) under the title "Return to Pooh Corner", a duet with Amy Grant, featuring backing vocals from Grant's then-husband, Gary Chapman. It appears on Loggins’ album of the same title.

== Samples ==
- The Loggins and Messina version was sampled in Daft Punk's 2001 hit "Face to Face".
