= Pick Up the Pieces =

Pick Up the Pieces may refer to:

== Music ==
=== Albums ===
- Pick Up the Pieces (album), by the Royals, or the title song, 1977
- Pick Up the Pieces, by Eddie Kirkland, 1981; or a 2010 short film about him
- Pick Up the Pieces, an EP by A Thorn for Every Heart, 2008

=== Songs ===
- "Pick Up the Pieces" (Average White Band song), 1974
- "Pick Up the Pieces" (Jason Derulo song), 2011
- "Pick Up the Pieces (Put It Back)", by Billy Ocean, 1993
- "Pick Up the Pieces (To My Heart)", by Cindy Valentine, 1989
- "Pick Up the Pieces", by Billy Joe Royal from Cherry Hill Park, 1969
- "Pick Up the Pieces", by BoDeans from Outside Looking In, 1987
- "Pick Up the Pieces", by Burning Spear from Studio One Presents Burning Spear, 1973
- "Pick Up the Pieces", by Carla Thomas, 1967
- "Pick Up the Pieces", by Hudson Ford, 1973
- "Pick Up the Pieces", by Money Mark from Brand New by Tomorrow, 2007
- "Pick Up the Pieces", by Riddlin' Kids from Hurry Up and Wait, 2002

== Other uses ==
- "Pick Up the Pieces" (Station 19), a 2022 television episode

== See also ==
- Picking Up the Pieces (disambiguation)
