= Pickin' Up the Pieces (song) =

Single by Poco

from the album Pickin' Up the Pieces
- B-side: "First Love"
- Written: 1967
- Released: July 1969
- Recorded: January 1969
- Genre: Country rock
- Length: 3:15
- Label: Epic
- Songwriter: Richie Furay
- Producer: Jim Messina

"Pickin' Up the Pieces" is the first song recorded by pioneer country rock band Poco. Written by founding member Richie Furay, the song was the title track of Poco's first album.

== History ==
After Buffalo Springfield broke up, members Richie Furay and Jim Messina decided to make a band with pedal steel guitar player Rusty Young, with whom they had recorded the Furay-penned Springfield song "Kind Woman". This was Furay's first Poco-intended song. According to Young, "Richie played 'Pickin' Up The Pieces' for us back in 1967. ... It was obviously a comment on leaving one thing behind and carrying on," referring to the breakup of Buffalo Springfield and the new beginnings with Poco.

== Attitude and impact ==
The single, though not commercially successful, was nonetheless undoubtedly instrumental in the creation of the then-new genre country rock. Richie Furay said of "Pickin' Up the Pieces": "To me it summarized the attitude we wanted to convey in our music: good, wholesome & positive. There was so much negativity going on in the world in the early 70s and it needed a refreshing sound. The country rock sound we were creating, would be it. We were innovators, pioneering the way for a whole new 'Southern California sound' that many groups who followed would capitalize on."
