= Loggins and Messina =

American music duo

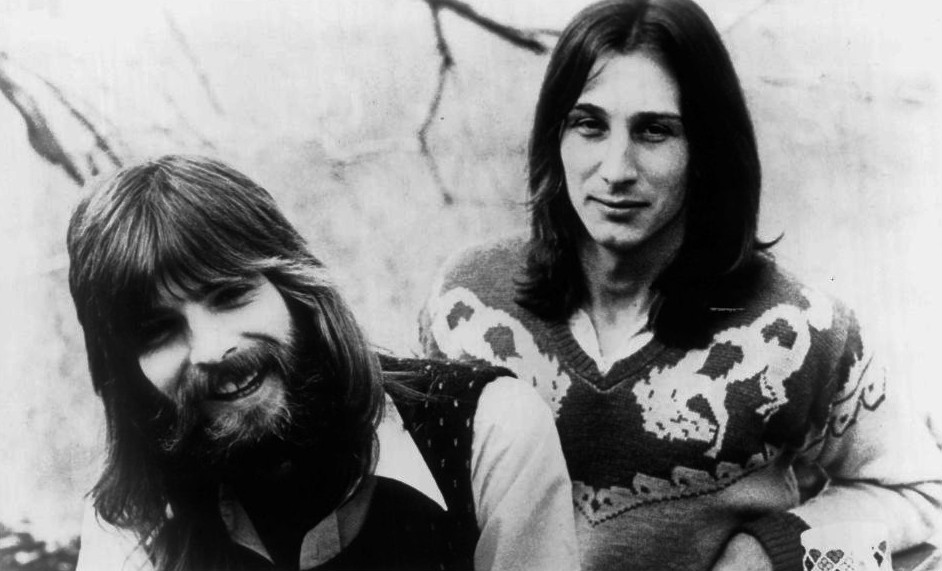
- Loggins (left) and Messina in 1972

Background information
- Origin: United States
- Genres: Country rock; folk rock; pop rock; soft rock
- Years active: 1971–1976; 2005; 2009
- Label: Columbia
- Past members: Kenny Loggins; Jim Messina
- Website: logginsandmessina.com

Loggins and Messina was an American pop rock duo consisting of Kenny Loggins and Jim Messina, who achieved major chart success during the early-mid 1970s. Among their well-known songs are "Danny's Song", "House at Pooh Corner", and "Your Mama Don't Dance". After selling more than 16 million records and becoming one of the leading musical duos of the 1970s, Loggins and Messina separated in 1976.

Although Messina would find only limited popularity following the parting, Loggins went on to achieve major chart success in the late 1970s, through the 1980s.

In 2005 and again in 2009, Loggins and Messina reformed for tours in the United States.

== History ==
=== Initial career 1971–1976 ===
Jim Messina, formerly of Buffalo Springfield and Poco, was working as an independent record producer for Columbia Records in 1970 when he met Kenny Loggins, a little-known singer/songwriter and guitarist who was signed to ABC-Dunhill as a staff songwriter.

The two recorded a number of Loggins' songs in Messina's home living room. When Columbia signed Loggins to a six-album contract (with the assistance of Messina), recording began in earnest for Loggins' debut album, with Messina as producer. Messina originally intended to lend his name to the Loggins project only to help introduce the unknown Loggins to Messina's well-established Buffalo Springfield and Poco audiences. However, by the time the album was completed, Messina had contributed so much to the album – in terms of songwriting, arrangement, instrumentation, and vocals – that an "accidental" duo was born.

Their debut album was released November 1971 as Kenny Loggins with Jim Messina Sittin' In. The album's first single release, the Caribbean-flavored "Vahevala" (or "Vahevella" or "Vaheevella"), pronounced "Va HEE-va-lah", found top 3 success on Chicago's WCFL on May 18, 1972. "Vahevala" and "Nobody But You" both reached the Hot 100. Although at first the album went unnoticed by radio upon release, it eventually gained traction by autumn 1972, particularly on college campuses where the pair toured heavily. Loggins' and Messina's harmonies meshed so well that what was begun as a one-off album became an entity unto itself. Audiences regarded the pair as a genuine duo rather than as a solo act with a well-known producer. Instead of just continuing to produce Loggins as a sole performer, they decided to record as a duo: Loggins and Messina.

On March 3, 1973, Loggins and Messina played Carnegie Hall. Ian Dove in the New York Times called it a "near-perfect rock 'n' roll concert".

"When our first album, Sittin' In, came out, we started receiving a lot of excitement about the music and good sales," Messina recalled in 2005. "We had a choice. It was either I now go on and continue to produce him and we do the solo career or we stay together and let this work. For me, I did not desire to go back out on the road. I had had enough of that, and I wanted to produce records. But Clive Davis (then president of the record company) intervened and said, 'You know, I think you'd be making a mistake if you guys didn't take this opportunity. Things like this only happen once in a lifetime. It may merit you sleeping on it overnight and making a decision that will be in your best interest.' He was absolutely correct. Kenny made the decision as well. It delayed his solo career, but it gave him an opportunity, I think, to have one."

Messina assembled The Kenny Loggins Band by summoning old friends, bassist Larry Sims and drummer Merel Bregante, formerly of The Sunshine Company, multireedist Jon Clarke, and violinist/multireedist Al Garth. Famed Grammy-winning keyboardist, songwriter and record producer Michael Omartian played keyboards on the debut, second and third albums, but did not join them on tour. Los Angeles–based session percussionist Milt Holland played on all of the duo's studio albums, but like Omartian, he did not tour with them.

Over the next four years, from 1972 to 1976, they produced four more studio albums of original material, plus one album of covers of other artists' material (So Fine), and two live albums. They sold 16 million records and were the most successful duo of the early 1970s, surpassed later in the decade only by Hall & Oates. They charted three top 20 singles from the second and third albums: "Your Mama Don't Dance" (No. 4), "Thinking of You" (No. 18), and "My Music" (No. 16). Their work was covered by other prominent artists, including Lynn Anderson, who recorded "Listen to a Country Song" in 1972 and reached No. 4 on the Country charts, and Anne Murray, who reached the U.S. top ten with "Danny's Song" in early 1973 and the U.S. top twenty with "A Love Song" in early 1974. The later studio albums, Mother Lode (1974), Native Sons (1976), often found both Loggins and Messina more as two solo artists sharing the same record rather than as a genuine partnership. As both Loggins and Messina noted in 2005, their collaboration eventually became more a competition.

Never really a team of true equals because of the initial teacher–apprentice nature of their music experience levels, the pair had quietly, amicably parted in 1976. Their final studio album of original material, Native Sons, was released January 1976. Later that year the duo went on a final tour, though prior to the start of the tour, Loggins accidentally cut his hand with a craft knife while practicing his wood-carving hobby at home which required surgery, thereby preventing him from playing guitar for most of that final tour. The final two concert dates of Loggins & Messina - as a duo - were in Honolulu, Hawaii, at the Neil S. Blaisdell Center, on September 24 and 25, 1976, upon which the duo then parted to embark on solo careers. Messina found solo success elusive, but Loggins went on to become one of the 1980s' biggest hitmakers.

A greatest-hits album, The Best of Friends, was released in November 1976, two months after the duo had ended. In January 1977, a second live album (from concerts in 1975 and 1976), Finale, was released, more by record company decision than one intended by the artists.

=== Reformation ===
The two reunited in 2005 to choose tracks for an expanded compilation album of singles and album cuts The Best: Sittin' In Again, which proved successful enough for them to embark on tour together. Their successful "Sittin' In Again" tour was launched in mid-2005 and played-out the remainder of the year. They also released an album that year of the tour. "Every couple of years we'd talk about it, but I was having too much fun as a solo artist," Loggins said that summer. "It was very rewarding for me, and I wasn't ready to share the reins. I still had a lot of stuff to do on my own, to prove myself and to express myself, in a way that wouldn't have fit in with Loggins and Messina."

The two were pleased enough to consider future Loggins and Messina projects and the two also toured in 2009. "Like most relationships, we were a moment in time," Loggins said. "It's just really fun to be able to go back and celebrate that and just sort of really honor each other as grown men, in a way we never really did back then. We were young and competitive and didn't realize that it wasn't necessarily all about getting your way, but you learn that if you grow up."

Their backing band changed from album to album, with the core members listed below. Some albums featured backing members who later were well-known in their own right; John Townsend and Ed Sanford, later of the Sanford-Townsend Band ("Smoke from a Distant Fire"), contributed vocals and songwriting to the Native Sons, their final studio album.

== Members ==
- Kenny Loggins – vocals, rhythm guitar, harmonica
- Jim Messina – vocals, lead guitar, mandolin, Dobro

Supporting personnel

- Al Garth – tenor saxophone, bass clarinet, alto saxophone, violin, recorder, viola, percussion, steel drum and backing vocals
- Jon Clarke – baritone saxophone, English horn, flute, tenor saxophone, soprano saxophone, bass saxophone, bass clarinet, recorder, bass flute, oboe, steel drum and percussion (died in 2005)
- Larry Sims – bass and backing vocals (died in 2014)
- Merel Bregante – drums, percussion, timbales and backing vocals
- Milt Holland – percussion (died in 2005)
- Michael Omartian – keyboards, percussion and concertina
- Vince Denham – flute, bass clarinet, alto, soprano and tenor saxophone
- Don Roberts – clarinet, alto flute, alto, baritone, soprano and tenor saxophone
- Steve Forman – percussion, vibes
- David Paich – keyboards
- Dave Wallace – synthesizer
- Chris Brooks – koto
- Michel Rubini – keyboards
- Richard Greene – violin, mandolin, mandocello
- Rusty Young – Dobro (died in 2021)
- Vince Charles – steel drums (died in 2001)
- Victor Feldman – percussion (died in 1987)

== Discography ==
=== Studio albums ===
Year	Album	Peak chart positions		Certifications
Year	Album	US	AUS	Certifications
1971	Sittin' In	70	—	US: Platinum
1972	Loggins and Messina	16	61	US: Platinum
1973	Full Sail	10	—	US: Platinum
1974	Mother Lode	8	89	US: Gold
1975	So Fine	21	83	
1976	Native Sons	16	—	US: Gold
"—" denotes releases that did not chart.

=== Live albums ===
Year	Album	Peak chart positions		Certifications
Year	Album	US	AUS	Certifications
1974	On Stage	5	97	US: Platinum
1977	Finale	83	—	
2005	Live: Sittin' In Again at the Santa Barbara Bowl	—	—	
"—" denotes releases that did not chart.

=== Compilation albums ===
Year	Album	US	Certifications
1976	The Best of Friends	61	US: 2× Platinum
1980	The Best of Loggins & Messina	—	
2005	The Best: Sittin' in Again	—	
2006	Their Music	—	
"—" denotes releases that did not chart.

=== Charted singles ===
Year	Song	Peak chart positions					Certifications
Year	Song	US	US C/B	US A/C	CAN	AUS	Certifications
1972	"Vahevala"	84	83	—	87	—	
1972	"Nobody But You"	86	88	—	80	—	
1972	"Your Mama Don't Dance"	4	5	19	5	30	US: Gold
1973	"Thinking of You"	18	11	7	20	65	
1973	"My Music"	16	13	10	28	65	
1974	"Watching the River Run"	71	41	36	51	—	
1975	"Changes"	84	62	—	85	—	
1975	"Growin'"	52	45	18	51	—	
1975	"I Like It Like That"	84	92	—	—	—	
1975	"A Lover's Question"	89	94	—	—	—	
1976	"Peacemaker"	—	113	—	—	—	
"—" denotes releases that did not chart.
