= Mother Lode (album) =

Studio album by Loggins and Messina
- Released: October 1974
- Recorded: Jim Messina's home ranch studio, Ojai, California
- Genre: Rock
- Length: 44:27
- Label: Columbia
- Producer: Jim Messina

Loggins and Messina chronology
On Stage (1974)	Mother Lode (1974)	So Fine (1975)

Mother Lode is the fourth studio album (fifth release overall) by singer-songwriter duo Loggins and Messina, released in late 1974. It was their final album with their original backing band, because multireedist and violinist Al Garth would soon leave the band, but multireedist Jon Clarke, bassist Larry Sims and drummer Merel Bregante remained, and saxophonist Don Roberts made his debut on this record. Future Toto keyboardist David Paich plays keyboards on this album while percussionist Milt Holland is augmented by Victor Feldman and the album was recorded on location at Jim Messina's California ranch. The Jim Messina composition "Keep Me in Mind" was sung by bassist Sims, whom Messina praised for having a phenomenal voice in a 2009 interview with Loggins for KCTS-TV.

In 2001, French duo Daft Punk, along with American producer Todd Edwards, sampled the track ''Be Free'' on their song Face To Face from their album Discovery.

Professional ratings
Review scores
Source	Rating
Allmusic	3/5 stars

== Track listing ==
All songs written and sung by Jim Messina unless otherwise indicated.

Side One
No.	Title	Writer(s)	Lead Vocals	Length
1.	"Growin'"	Kenny Loggins, Ronnie Wilkins	Loggins	2:39
2.	"Be Free"			7:01
3.	"Changes"			3:53
4.	"Brighter Days"	Loggins, Dona Lyn George	Loggins	3:42
5.	"Time to Space"	Loggins, George	Loggins, Larry Sims	5:48

Side Two
No.	Title	Writer(s)	Lead Vocals	Length
6.	"Lately My Love"			3:32
7.	"Move On"			7:29
8.	"Get a Hold"	Loggins	Loggins	3:37
9.	"Keep Me in Mind"		Sims	3:38
10.	"Fever Dream"	Loggins, Maury Muehleisen	Loggins	3:03

== Personnel ==
- Kenny Loggins – vocals, rhythm guitar, acoustic guitar, harmonica
- Jim Messina – vocals, lead guitar, acoustic guitar, mandolin

=== Loggins and Messina band ===
- Larry Sims – bass, backing vocals, lead vocals on "Keep Me in Mind"
- Merel Bregante – drums, timbales, backing vocals
- Jon Clarke – flute, oboe, bass flute, English horn, tenor saxophone, alto flute, soprano saxophone, baritone saxophone, bass saxophone
- Al Garth – violin, recorder, tenor saxophone, alto saxophone, bass clarinet

=== Sidemen ===
- Chris Brooks – koto
- Milt Holland – percussion
- Victor Feldman – percussion
- David Paich – keyboards
- Don Roberts – flute, bass flute, tenor saxophone, soprano saxophone, baritone saxophone, bass saxophone, bass clarinet, alto flute
- David Wallace – synthesizers

== Production ==
- Producer – Jim Messina
- Engineers – Corey Bailey, Alex Kazanegras and Jim Messina.
- Technical Assistance – Lou Shatzer
- Recorded on location at Jim Messina's Ranch, Ojai, California using Haji Sound.
- Photography – Tyler Thornton
- Color Prints – Ted Staidle
- Art Direction and Design – Ron Coro
- Personal Management – Schiffman and Larsen
- Road Management – David Cieslak and Jim Recor

== Charts ==
Album – Billboard (United States)

Year	Chart	Position
1974	Pop Albums	8
1974	Australia (Kent Music Report)	89

Singles - Billboard (United States)

Year	Song	Position
1975	Changes	84
1975	Growin'	52
