= Pickin' Up the Pieces (Poco album) =

Studio album by Poco
- Released: May 19, 1969
- Recorded: January 1969
- Genre: Country rock
- Length: 42:43
- Label: Epic
- Producer: Jim Messina

Poco chronology
Pickin' Up the Pieces (1969)	Poco (1970)

Pickin' Up the Pieces is the debut album by country rock band Poco, released in 1969. It was one of the earliest examples of the emerging genre of country rock. Several of the songs date back to Richie Furay's days in Buffalo Springfield. An early version of "What a Day" was included on the Buffalo Springfield box set in 2001.

Bassist Randy Meisner appears on the album but quit the band shortly before the record was released. Meisner's exit was the result of his anger from being excluded (at Furay's insistence) from participation in the final mix playback sessions for the album, as only Messina and Furay were to complete production. His image was removed from the painting on the cover and replaced with the dog seen at the far left. His bass parts and backing vocals were left in the mix, but his lead vocals were removed, and new versions were sung by George Grantham. He is not credited as a group member on the completed album, but is listed in the credits as providing "supporting vocals and bass".

== Reception ==
Professional ratings
Review scores
Source	Rating
Allmusic	4.5/5 stars
Robert Christgau	B

In his Allmusic review, music critic Bruce Eder called the album a "startlingly great record, as accomplished as any of Buffalo Springfield's releases, and also reminiscent of the Beatles and the Byrds... The mix of good-time songs, fast-paced instrumentals, and overall rosy feelings makes this a great introduction to the band, as well as a landmark in country-rock only slightly less important (but arguably more enjoyable than) Sweetheart of the Rodeo." Robert Christgau wrote; "Nice and happy, but considering the personnel a disappointment."

== Track listing ==
Side 1

1. a. "Foreword" (Richie Furay, Kathy Johnson) – 0:48 / b."What a Day" (Furay) – 2:28
2. "Nobody's Fool" (Furay) – 3:26
3. "Calico Lady" (Furay, Jim Messina, Skip Goodwin) – 3:03
4. "First Love" (Furay) – 3:08
5. a."Make Me a Smile (Furay, Messina) – 3:18 / b."Short Changed" (Furay) – 3:17

Side 2

1. "Pickin' Up the Pieces" (Furay) – 3:20
2. "Grand Junction" (Rusty Young) – 2:58
3. "Oh Yeah" (Furay, Messina) – 4:06
4. "Just in Case It Happens, Yes Indeed" (Furay) – 2:45
5. "Tomorrow (Furay, Goodwin) – 3:11
6. "Consequently, So Long" (Furay, Goodwin) – 3:50

Bonus Track:

1. "Do You Feel It Too" (Furay) – 3:05 (not on the original LP, but a previously unissued alternate take, added to the album's first release on CD)

== Personnel ==
Poco

- Richie Furay – 12-string guitar, lead vocals (1, 2, 4, 5, 6, 9, 10, 11), and backing vocals
- Jim Messina – acoustic and electric 6-string guitars, lead vocals (8), and backing vocals
- Rusty Young – steel guitar, banjo, dobro, guitar, piano
- George Grantham – drums, lead vocals (3, 6), and backing vocals

with:

- Randy Meisner – bass guitar, backing vocals
- Bobby Doyle – piano
- Milt Holland – percussion

== Production ==
- Jim Messina – producer
- Terry Dunavan – recording engineer
- Nick DeCaro – horn arrangement on "Nobody's Fool"; string arrangement on "Tomorrow"
- Frank Bez – photography
- Drew Struzan – cover illustration
