= So Fine (Loggins and Messina album) =

Studio album by Loggins and Messina
- Released: August 1975
- Recorded: Jim Messina's ranch, Ojai, California
- Genre: Rock
- Length: 33:38
- Label: Columbia
- Producer: Jim Messina

Loggins and Messina chronology
Mother Lode (1974)	So Fine (1975)	Native Sons (1976)

So Fine is the fifth studio album (and sixth overall) by singer-songwriter duo Loggins and Messina, released in 1975. It consists of a collection of covers of 1950s and 1960s rock, country and rockabilly songs.

Professional ratings
Review scores
Source	Rating
Allmusic	2/5 stars

== Track listing ==
=== Side one ===
1. "Oh, Lonesome Me" (Don Gibson) – 2:49
2. "My Baby Left Me" (Arthur "Big Boy" Crudup) – 2:51
3. "Wake Up Little Susie" (Felice and Boudleaux Bryant) – 2:02
4. "I'm Movin' On" (Hank Snow) – 3:45
5. "Hello Mary Lou" (Gene Pitney) – 2:17
6. "Hey Good Lookin'" (Hank Williams) – 2:35

=== Side two ===
1. "Splish Splash" (Bobby Darin, Murray the K) – 2:20
2. "A Lover's Question" (Brook Benton, Jimmy Williams) – 3:21
3. "You Never Can Tell" (Chuck Berry) – 3:14
4. "I Like It Like That" (Chris Kenner) – 3:06
5. "So Fine" (Johnny Otis) – 2:37
6. "Honky Tonk – Part II" (Billy Butler, Bill Doggett, Clifford Scott, Shep Shepherd) – 2:41

== Personnel ==
- Kenny Loggins – vocals, rhythm guitar, acoustic guitar, harmonica, banjo
- Jim Messina – vocals, lead guitar, acoustic guitar, dobro, mandolin

=== Loggins and Messina band ===
- Merel Bregante – drums
- Jon Clarke – flute, saxophone
- Vince Denham – saxophone
- Richard Greene – violin
- Larry Sims – bass guitar, backing vocals
- Don Roberts – saxophone, flute

=== Sidemen ===
- Michel Rubini – piano
- Milt Holland – percussion
- Steve Forman – percussion

== Production ==
- Producer: Jim Messina
- Engineer: Alex Kazanegras
- 2nd engineer: Jim Messina
- Recordist: Corey Bailey
- Recording technician: Lew Schatzer
- Road managers: Jim Recor, David Cieslak
- Personal management: Schiffman & Larson
- Equipment managers: Carl Moritz, Steve Semonell
- Photography: Jim McCrary, Reid Miles
- Design: Ron Coro, Nancy Donald

== Charts ==
Album – Billboard (United States)

Year	Chart	Position
1975	Pop Albums	21
1976	Country Albums	49
1976	Australia (Kent Music Report)	83
