= Loggins and Messina (album) =

Studio album by Loggins and Messina
- Released: October 1972
- Recorded: Columbia Studios, Los Angeles
- Genre: Rock
- Length: 36:49
- Label: Columbia
- Producer: Kenny Loggins, Jim Messina

Loggins and Messina chronology
Sittin' In (1971)	Loggins and Messina (1972)	Full Sail (1973)

Loggins and Messina is the second album by singer-songwriters Loggins and Messina, released in 1972.

Following on the success of their first album, this album built on the strengths of their debut outing. It also became the true introduction of the team, Loggins and Messina, not as singles playing together, but rather as a team that played as one.

It featured two songs that charted, with "Your Mama Don't Dance" reaching its peak at number 4, their highest-charting single. The album itself charted at number 16. The album version of "Thinking of You" is a different recording than the hit single. Kenny Loggins played harmonica on four songs: "Whiskey", "Long Tail Cat", "Thinking of You" and the Jim Messina-penned instrumental "Just Before the News".

Professional ratings
Review scores
Source	Rating
Allmusic	4.5/5 stars
Encyclopedia of Popular Music	5/5 stars

== Track listing ==
Side One
No.	Title	Writer(s)	Lead Vocals	Length
1.	"Good Friend"	Jim Messina	Messina	4:04
2.	"Whiskey"	Kenny Loggins	Loggins	1:58
3.	"Your Mama Don't Dance"	Loggins, Messina	Loggins, Messina	2:48
4.	"Long Tail Cat"	Loggins	Loggins	3:47
5.	"Golden Ribbons"	Messina	Loggins, Messina, Larry Sims	6:08

Side Two
No.	Title	Writer(s)	Lead Vocals	Length
6.	"Thinking of You"	Messina	Messina	2:19
7.	"Just Before the News"	Messina	instrumental	1:09
8.	"Till the Ends Meet"	Loggins	Loggins	3:10
9.	"Holiday Hotel"	Messina, Al Garth	Messina	2:02
10.	"Lady of My Heart"	Loggins	Loggins	1:44
11.	"Angry Eyes"	Loggins, Messina	Loggins, Messina	7:40
Total length:				36:49

== Personnel ==
- Kenny Loggins – vocals, rhythm guitar, harmonica, acoustic guitar
- Jim Messina – vocals, lead guitar, electric mandolin, acoustic guitar

Loggins & Messina band

- Merel Bregante – drums, backing vocals
- Lester "Al" Garth – violin, recorder, alto saxophone, tenor saxophone
- Jon Clarke – flute, oboe, recorder, baritone saxophone, soprano saxophone, tenor saxophone
- Larry Sims – bass, backing vocals

Sidemen

- Michael Omartian – Hammond organ, acoustic piano, harmonium, clavinet, tack piano, Wurlitzer electric piano
- Rusty Young – Dobro on "Long Tail Cat"
- Milt Holland – percussion

Production

- Producer – Jim Messina
- Engineer – George Beauregard
- Mixing – John Fiore
- Recording Consultant – Alex Kazanegras
- Design – Ron Coro and Anne Garner
- Front Cover Photo – Jim Marshall
- Back Cover Photo – Marsha Reed
- Management – Schiffman and Larsen

== Charts ==
Album – Billboard (United States)

Year	Chart	Position
1972	US Pop Albums	16
1972	Australia (Kent Music Report)	61

Singles - Billboard (United States)

Year	Single	Chart	Position
1972	"Your Mama Don't Dance"	Pop Singles	4 (#5 Canada (RPM Magazine))
1973	"Thinking of You"	Pop Singles	18 (#20 Canada (RPM Magazine))
1973	"Thinking of You"	Adult Contemporary	7 (#16 Canada (RPM Magazine))
