= Full Sail (Loggins and Messina album) =

Studio album by Loggins and Messina
- Released: October 1973
- Recorded: Wally Heider Studios and Studio 4 (Hollywood, CA)
- Genres: Rock, pop
- Length: 42:37
- Label: Columbia
- Producer: Jim Messina

Loggins and Messina chronology
Loggins and Messina (1972)	Full Sail (1973)	On Stage (1974)

Full Sail is the third album by singer-songwriter duo Loggins and Messina, released in 1973. It showed the versatility of the duo, with everything from 1950s retro to island-style to soft ballads. The single "My Music" charted at No. 16, and the follow-up, "Watching the River Run", made it to No. 71. The album as a whole did better, reaching No. 10 on the Pop Charts.

Professional ratings
Review scores
Source	Rating
Allmusic	3/5 stars

== Track listing ==
=== Side one ===
1. "Lahaina" (Jim Messina) – 2:32 (lead singer: Jim Messina)
2. "Travelin' Blues" (Messina) – 3:44 (lead singer: Jim Messina)
3. "My Music" (Kenny Loggins, Messina) – 3:04 (lead singer: Jim Messina)
4. "A Love Song" (Loggins, Dona Lyn George) – 3:11 (lead singer: Kenny Loggins)
5. "You Need a Man/Coming to You" (Messina) – 5:22/3:48 (No track split) (lead singers: Kenny Loggins [You Need a Man]/Jim Messina [Coming to You])

=== Side two ===
1. "Watching the River Run" (Messina, Loggins) – 3:27 (lead singers: Kenny Loggins, Jim Messina)
2. "Pathway to Glory" (Messina) – 8:37 (lead singer: Jim Messina)
3. "Didn't I Know You When" (Loggins, Michael Omartian) – 2:40 (lead singer: Kenny Loggins)
4. "Sailin' the Wind" (Daniel Loggins, Dann Lottermoser) – 6:09 (lead singer: Kenny Loggins)

== Personnel ==
- Kenny Loggins – vocals, rhythm guitar, acoustic guitar, harmonica
- Jim Messina – vocals, lead guitar, acoustic guitar, mandolin

Loggins & Messina band

- Jon Clarke – oboe, baritone saxophone, bass saxophone, soprano saxophone, tenor saxophone, flute, alto flute, bass flute, bass clarinet, English horn
- Al Garth – violin, bass clarinet, recorder, alto saxophone, tenor saxophone
- Larry Sims – bass, backing vocals
- Merel Bregante – drums, timbales, backing vocals

Additional musicians

- Michael Omartian – keyboards
- Vince Charles – steel drums
- Milt Holland – percussion

Production

- Producer – Jim Messina
- Photography – Ed Caraeff
- Art Direction – Ron Coro
- Illustrations – Joe Garnett
- Engineers – Jim Messina and Alex Kazanegras
- Quadraphonic Mix – Larry Keys and Alex Kazanegras
- Quadraphonic Mix Supervision – Al Lawrence and Alex Kazanegras

== Charts ==
Album – Billboard (United States)

Year	Chart	Position
1974	Pop Albums	10

Singles – Billboard (United States)

Year	Single	Chart	Position
1973	"My Music"	Hot 100	16 (No. 28 Canada (RPM Magazine))
1974	"Watching the River Run"	Hot 100	71
1974	"Love Song"	Hot 100	12, Country No. 5, AC No. 1 performed by Anne Murray
