= Native Sons (Loggins and Messina album) =

Studio album by Loggins and Messina
- Released: January 1976
- Recorded: Jim Messina's home ranch studio, Ojai, California
- Genre: Rock
- Length: 38:21
- Label: Columbia
- Producer: Jim Messina

Loggins and Messina chronology
So Fine (1975)	Native Sons (1976)	Finale (1977)

Native Sons is the sixth and final studio album (and seventh overall release) by singer-songwriter duo Loggins and Messina, released in January 1976. It was a departure from previous recordings owing to the presence of string sections, stronger emphasis on flute, minimized use of saxophone, downplayed country influences and Jim Messina's signature guitar work was barely in evidence. After a final concert in Hawaii, the duo quietly went their separate ways. The Messina-penned rock and roll song "Boogie Man" was later covered by Australian rock band The Blue Echoes.

Professional ratings
Review scores
Source	Rating
AllMusic	3/5 stars

== Track listing ==
Side one
No.	Title	Writer(s)	Lead singer	Length
1.	"Sweet Marie"	Jim Messina	Messina	3:03
2.	"Pretty Princess"	Messina, Murray MacLeod	Messina	6:55
3.	"My Lady, My Love"	Kenny Loggins	Loggins	3:00
4.	"When I Was a Child"	Messina	Messina	4:17
5.	"Wasting Our Time"	Loggins, John Townsend	Loggins	2:49

Side two
No.	Title	Writer(s)	Lead singer	Length
1.	"Peacemaker"	Loggins, Townsend, Ed Sanford	Loggins	5:02
2.	"It's Alright"	Messina, MacLeod	Messina (spoken introduction by actor Barry Sullivan)	4:00
3.	"Boogie Man"	Messina	Messina	2:04
4.	"Fox Fire"	Loggins	Loggins	2:58
5.	"Native Son"	Loggins, Dan Loggins	Loggins	4:10

== Personnel ==
- Kenny Loggins – lead and backing vocals, rhythm guitar and acoustic guitar, harmonica
- Jim Messina – lead and backing vocals, lead guitar, acoustic guitar, dobro
- John Townsend – backing vocals
- Ed Sanford – backing vocals
- Murray MacLeod – vocals, backing vocals
- Merel Bregante – drums, timbales
- Jon Clarke – flute, English horn, oboe, baritone, bass, soprano and tenor saxophone, soprano recorder
- Vince Denham – flute, bass clarinet, alto, soprano and tenor saxophone
- Steve Forman – percussion, vibraphone
- Richard Greene – fiddle, mandolin, mandocello
- Milt Holland – percussion
- Larry Sims – bass, backing vocals
- Don Roberts – clarinet, alto flute, alto, baritone, soprano and tenor saxophone
- Mike Rubini – keyboards

== Production ==
- Producer: Jim Messina
- Engineer: Alex Kazanegras
- 2nd engineer: Jim Messina
- Recordist: Corey Bailey
- Recording technician: Lew Schatzer
- Recorded on location with Haji Sound
- Photography: Ed Caraeff
- Copper frame: Nick Fasciano
- Design: Ron Coro
- Handwriting: Virginia Team

== Charts ==
Album – Billboard (United States)

Year	Chart	Position
1976	Pop Albums	16
