= Sittin' In (Loggins and Messina album) =

Studio album by Loggins and Messina
- Released: November 1971
- Recorded: Summer 1971 at Columbia Studios, Los Angeles
- Genres: Rock, folk rock
- Length: 44:57
- Label: Columbia
- Producer: Jim Messina

Loggins and Messina chronology
Sittin' In (1971)	Loggins and Messina (1972)

Professional ratings
Review scores
Source	Rating
Allmusic	4.5/5 stars
Christgau's Record Guide	C
Creem	C+

Sittin' In is the debut studio album by singer-songwriters Loggins and Messina, released in 1971.

It began as a solo album by Kenny Loggins; Jim Messina was with Columbia Records, serving as an independent producer when he met Loggins. In the course of producing Loggins' work, Messina composed several songs and provided backing vocals and guitar, leading to the album's full title, Kenny Loggins with Jim Messina Sittin' In.

MFSL released an audiophile version of Sittin' In on the label's silver compact disc series in 1989. In 1994, Columbia Records' Sony Mastersound division also did their own remastering and released it as a gold CD. A new remastering by Kevin Gray was released as a vinyl-only pressing on 180-gram audiophile vinyl by Friday Music on May 10, 2011. In 2015, it was released by the Audio Fidelity label on a hybrid SACD that was mastered by Kevin Gray.

== Track listing ==
All tracks are written by Kenny Loggins, except where noted.

Side one
No.	Title	Writer(s)	Lead singer	Length
1.	"Nobody But You"	Jim Messina	Messina	3:00
2.	"Danny's Song"		Loggins	4:16
3.	"Vahevala"	Dann Lottermoser; Dan Loggins	Loggins	4:47
4.	"Trilogy: 1. Lovin' Me; 2. To Make a Woman Feel Wanted; 3. Peace of Mind"	Messina; Murray MacLeod; Messina; Loggins; Messina	Messina: Messina; Loggins; Loggins	11:13

Side two
No.	Title	Writer(s)	Lead singer	Length
1.	"Back to Georgia"		Loggins	3:19
2.	"House at Pooh Corner"		Loggins	4:25
3.	"Listen to a Country Song"	Messina; Al Garth	Messina	2:49
4.	"Same Old Wine"	Messina	Messina	8:17
5.	"Rock 'n' Roll Mood"	Loggins; Michael Omartian	Loggins	3:04

== Personnel ==
Loggins & Messina

- Kenny Loggins – vocals, rhythm guitar, acoustic guitar, harmonica
- Jim Messina – vocals, lead guitar, acoustic guitar
- Jon Clarke – oboe, steel drum, flute, tenor saxophone, baritone saxophone
- Lester "Al" Garth – violin, recorder, tenor saxophone, viola, alto saxophone, steel drum, backing vocals
- Larry Sims – bass guitar, backing vocals
- Merel Bregante – drums, backing vocals

Additional musicians

- Michael Omartian – concertina, keyboards, steel drum
- Milt Holland – percussion

Production

- Jim Messina – producer
- John Fiore – engineer
- Alex Kazanegras – mastering and mixing
- David Linderman – cover artwork
- Irvin Goodnoff and David Linderman – photography

== Charts ==
Album – Billboard (United States)

Year	Chart	Position
1972	Pop Albums	70

Singles – Billboard (United States)

Year	Single	Chart	Position
1972	"Vahevala"	Pop Singles	84
1972	"Nobody But You"	Pop Singles	86
