= Milt Holland =

American drummer (1917–2005)

- Born: Milton Olshansky; February 7, 1917; Chicago, Illinois, U.S.
- Died: November 4, 2005 (aged 88) Los Angeles, California, U.S.
- Genres: Jazz, rock, pop, R&B, funk, soul
- Occupation: Musician
- Instruments: Drums, percussion

Milton Holland (born Milton Olshansky; February 7, 1917 – November 4, 2005) was an American drummer, percussionist, ethnomusicologist and writer in the Los Angeles music scene. He pioneered the use of African, South American, and Indian percussion styles in jazz, pop and film music, traveling extensively in those regions to collect instruments and learn styles of playing them.

== Early life ==
Holland was born Milton Olshansky in Chicago, Illinois where he attended Theodore Roosevelt High School. His first instrument was the violin which he quickly replaced with Drumset and Percussion. He pursued a passion for jazz drumming and percussion, playing in clubs and shows and on CBS Radio in Chicago. By the age of twelve, he was playing at speakeasies for the likes of Al Capone. He also spent many years on the road in Jazz bands including Raymond Scott.

== Career ==
In the early 1940s, Holland toured and recorded with The Raymond Scott Orchestra.

He studied tabla at University of California, Los Angeles and from 1963 through 1965, with tabla master Pandit Chatur Lal in India, Ramnad Easwaran and others. He traveled through India extensively in the early 1960s and 1970s, and traveled to Brazil and Africa studying popular and tribal rhythms. He was among the first to introduce many of those instruments to western recording.

After moving to Los Angeles in 1946, he played on countless jazz and pop albums, film and TV scores. A sampling of the artists he worked with includes Frank Sinatra, Bing Crosby, the Beatles, the Rolling Stones, Joe Cocker, Chaka Khan, John Williams, Leonard Bernstein, Elmer Bernstein, Ernest Gold, Quincy Jones, Bernard Herrmann, Nat King Cole, Henry Mancini, Loggins and Messina, James Taylor, Ella Fitzgerald, Laurindo Almeida, Ry Cooder, Bonnie Raitt, Seals and Crofts, Ray Manzarek, Michael Dinner, Gordon Lightfoot, Ringo Starr, Nelson Riddle, Kenny Loggins, Jim Messina, Poco, Captain Beefheart, David Blue, Rita Coolidge, Carly Simon, Paul Simon, Cal Tjader, John Cassavetes, the Doobie Brothers, Little Feat, Maria Muldaur, Randy Newman, and Joni Mitchell. He played pandeiro, congas and triangle on Mitchell's hit Big Yellow Taxi and congas and percussion on Light My Fire with José Feliciano. He played all the african percussion instruments in sequences of the soundtrack for the film "The Color Purple" (dir. Steven Spielberg).

As part of the so-called "Wrecking Crew," Holland won several gold and platinum records for his contributions. He was perhaps most proud of having helped desegregate the Los Angeles Musicians Union. Eventually, Holland became the first choice for exotic percussion among Los Angeles freelance session musicians.

In films, Holland played bongos and possibly other percussion or drums on the soundtrack of West Side Story and timpani the soundtrack of Silent Running, Tablas and percussion on "Southern Comfort" (1981) with Ry Cooder - to name only a tiny fraction of his output. He was one of seven illustrious percussionists, including Shelly Manne, Jack Sperling, and Larry Bunker, who contributed to the soundtrack of the John Wayne film Hatari!, playing African instruments on the soundtrack album, The Sounds of Hatari, and its title track. He played for the soundtrack of the TV miniseries Roots. He also played the musical accompaniment for Tinker Bell in the 1953 Disney cartoon film Peter Pan and for the nose tinkle in the TV series Bewitched.

== Death and personal life ==
Holland died in Los Angeles at the age of 88. He was survived by his wife Mildred Holland, his sons, Richard Holland and Robert Holland, his grandchildren, Damien and Chloe, and Richard's wife Seiko.

His widow Mildred died on October 21, 2015.

== Discography ==
=== As leader ===
- Perfect Percussion: The 44 Instruments of Roy Harte & Milt Holland (World-Pacific Records, 1961)

=== As sideman ===
With Karen Alexander

- Isn't It Always Love (Asylum, 1975)

With Gregg Allman Band

- Playin' Up a Storm (Capricorn, 1977)

With Laurindo Almeida

- Ole! Bossa Nova (1962)
- Acapulco '22 (Tower, 1963)
- Brazil & Beyond (1981)
- Brazilian Soul (Concord, 1981)

With The Andrews Sisters

- Fresh and Fancy Free (Capitol, 1957)

With The Association

- Birthday (Warner Bros., 1968)

With Frankie Avalon

- ...And Now About Mr. Avalon (Chancellor, 1961)

With Hoyt Axton

- Life Machine (A&M, 1974)

With Burt Bacharach

- Blue Note Plays Burt Bacharach (Blue Note, 2004)

With Joan Baez

- Gracias a la Vida (A&M, 1974)

With David Batteau

- Happy in Hollywood (A&M, 1976)

With Beaver & Krause

- In a Wild Sanctuary (Warner Bros. Records, 1970)

With Captain Beefheart

- Safe as Milk (Buddah, 1967)
- Clear Spot (Reprise, 1972)

With Louis Bellson

- Louis Bellson Swings Jule Styne (1960)

With Elmer Bernstein

- The Man with the Golden Arm (Decca, 1956)

With Elvin Bishop

- Rock My Soul (Epic, 1972)

With David Blue

- Stories (Asylum, 1971)

With Bonaroo

- Bonaroo (Warner Bros., 1975)

With Pat Boone

- Great! Great! Great! (Dot, 1961)

With Delaney Bramlett

- Some Things Coming (Columbia, 1972)

With Brewer & Shipley

- Down in L.A. (A&M, 1968)

With Charlie Byrd

- Best Of The Concord Years (2000)

With Glen Campbell

- Southern Nights (Capitol, 1977)

With David Cassidy

- Dreams Are Nuthin' More Than Wishes (Bell, 1973)

With Buddy Childers

- Sam Songs (1955)

With Stanley Clarke

- School Days (1976)

With Joe Cocker

- Joe Cocker! (A&M, 1969)

With Ray Conniff

- Friendly Persuasion (1965)

With Ry Cooder

- Ry Cooder (Reprise, 1970)
- Into the Purple Valley (Reprise, 1971)
- Boomer's Story (Reprise, 1972)
- Paradise and Lunch (Reprise, 1974)
- Chicken Skin Music (Reprise, 1976)
- Bop Till You Drop (Warner Bros., 1979)

With Rita Coolidge

- Fall into Spring (A&M, 1974)

With Bing Crosby and Rosemary Clooney

- Fancy Meeting You Here (RCA Victor, 1958)

With Patti Dahlstrom

- Your Place or Mine (20th Century, 1975)

With Bobby Darin

- Bobby Darin Sings The Shadow of Your Smile (Atlantic, 1966)

With Ron Davies

- U. F. O. (A&M, 1973)

With Jackie Davis

- Hammond Goes Cha-Cha (1959)

With Buddy DeFranco

- I Hear Benny Goodman and Artie Shaw
- Wholly Cats

With Doug Dillard

- The Banjo Album (Together, 1969)

With The 5th Dimension

- The Age of Aquarius (Soul City, 1969)
- Individually & Collectively (Bell, 1972)
- Living Together, Growing Together (Bell, 1973)

With The Doobie Brothers

- What Were Once Vices Are Now Habits (Warner Bros., 1974)

With Don Everly

- Don Everly (Ode, 1970)

With Percy Faith

- Black Magic Woman (CBS, 1971)

With Little Feat

- Sailin' Shoes (Warner Bros., 1972)
- Dixie Chicken (Warner Bros., 1973)

With Victor Feldman

- Secret Of The Andes (Nautilus, 1982)

With José Feliciano

- Feliciano! (RCA Victor, 1968)
- Souled (RCA Victor, 1968)
- Feliciano/10 to 23 (RCA Victor, 1969)
- And the Feeling's Good (RCA Victor, 1974)

With Jerry Fielding

- Jerry Fielding and his Orchestra (1953)

With Ella Fitzgerald

- Get Happy! (Verve, 1959)
- Hello Love (Verve, 1960)

With The Free Movement

- I've Found Someone of My Own (Columbia, 1972)

With The Four Freshmen

- Voices In Latin (Capitol, 1958)

With Art Garfunkel

- Angel Clare (Columbia, 1973)

With Jackie Gleason

- The Now Sound For Today's Lovers (1969)

With Graham Central Station

- Graham Central Station (Warner Bros., 1974)

With Arlo Guthrie

- Running Down the Road (Reprise, 1969)
- Arlo Guthrie (Reprise, 1974)
- Amigo (Reprise, 1976)

With John Hall

- John Hall (Asylum, 1978)

With Lani Hall

- Sun Down Lady (A&M, 1972)
- Sweet Bird (A&M, 1976)

With Richard Harris

- The Yard Went On Forever (Dunhill, 1968)

With Joni James

- Like Three O'Clock In The Morning (MGM, 1963)
- After Hours (MGM, 1963)

With Pete Jolly

- Seasons (A&M, 1970)

With Quincy Jones

- The Hot Rock OST (Prophesy, 1972)
- Roots (A&M, 1977)

With Barbara Keith

- Barbara Keith (Reprise, 1973)

With Stan Kenton

- Retrospective

With Al Kooper

- Easy Does It (Columbia, 1971)

With Peggy Lee

- Bridge over Troubled Water (Capitol, 1970)

With Claudia Lennear

- Phew (Warner Bros., 1973)

With Ketty Lester

- Love Letters (ERA, 1962)

With Gordon Lightfoot

- Sundown (Reprise, 1974)
- Cold on the Shoulder (Reprise, 1975)

With Kenny Loggins

- Keep the Fire (Columbia, 1979)

With Henry Mancini

- The Latin Sound Of Henry Mancini (1965)
- Mancini '67 (1966)
- Mancini Salutes Sousa (1972)

With Johnny Mandel

- I Want to Live (United Artists, 1958)

With Herbie Mann

- The Magic Flute of Herbie Mann (1957)
- Sound of Mann (Verve, 1963)

With Ray Manzarek

- The Golden Scarab (Mercury, 1974)

With Mark-Almond

- To The Heart (ABC, 1976)

With Dean Martin

- Young Dino (Proper, 2006)

With Melanie

- Photograph (Atlantic, 1976)
- Seventh Wave (Neighborhoud, 1983)

With Jim Messina

- Oasis (Columbia, 1979)

With Loggins & Messina

- Sittin' In (Columbia, 1971)
- Loggins and Messina (Columbia, 1972)
- Full Sail (Columbia, 1973)
- Mother Lode (Columbia, 1974)
- So Fine (Columbia, 1975)
- Native Sons (Columbia, 1976)

With Joni Mitchell

- Ladies of the Canyon (Reprise, 1970)
- Court and Spark (Asylum, 1974)

With The Monkees

- The Birds, the Bees & the Monkees (Colgems, 1968)
- Instant Replay (Colgems, 1969)

With Howdy Moon

- Howdy Moon (A&M, 1974)

With Chris Morris

- Christopher Morris Band (MCA, 1977)

With Johnny Nash

- Celebrate Life (CBS, 1974)

With Randy Newman

- 12 Songs (Reprise, 1970)
- Sail Away (Reprise, 1972)
- Good Old Boys (Reprise, 1974)
- Little Criminals (Reprise, 1977)

With Harry Nilsson

- Pandemonium Shadow Show (RCA Victor, 1967)
- Aerial Ballet (RCA Victor, 1968)
- Harry (RCA Victor, 1969)
- The Point! (RCA Victor, 1970)
- Aerial Pandemonium Ballet (RCA Victor, 1971)
- Son of Schmilsson (RCA Victor, 1972)

With Anita O'Day

- Anita Sings the Most (Verve, 1957)
- Complete Signature & London Recordings (The Jazz Factory, 2001)

With Gabby Pahinui

- Best Of The Gabby Band (1979)

With Van Dyke Parks

- Discover America (Warner Bros., 1972)

With Linda Perhacs

- Parallelograms (Kapp, 1970)

With Oscar Peterson

- Oscar Peterson and Friends (1952)

With Ray Peterson

- Tell Laura I Love Her (1960)

With Bill Plummer

- Cosmic Brotherhood (1968)

With Poco

- Pickin' Up the Pieces (Epic, 1969)
- Poco (Epic, 1970)
- Rose of Cimarron (ABC, 1976)

With Bonnie Raitt

- Takin' My Time (Warner Bros., 1973)

With Frankie Randall

- Going The Frankie Randall Way! (RCA Victor, 1966)

With Helen Reddy

- Helen Reddy (Capitol, 1971)

With Martha Reeves

- Martha Reeves (MCA, 1974)

With Johnny Rivers

- Road (Atlantic, 1974)
- Outside Help (Big Tree, 1977)

With Shorty Rogers

- Bossa Nova (1962)

With Rufus with Chaka Khan

- Ask Rufus (ABC, 1977)

With Pete Rugolo

- The Original Music of Thriller (1961)

With Sanford & Townsend

- Duo-Glide (Warner Bros., 1977)

With Lalo Schifrin

- Gone with the Wave (1964)
- Jazz Suite on the Mass Texts (1965) with Paul Horn
- There's a Whole Lalo Schifrin Goin' On (1968)

With Seals and Crofts

- Summer Breeze (Warner Bros., 1972)
- Get Closer (Warner Bros., 1976)

With John Sebastian

- Tarzana Kid (Reprise, 1974)

With Neil Sedaka

- Sedaka's Back (Rocket, 1974)
- Laughter in the Rain (Polydor, 1974)
- The Hungry Years (Rocket, 1975)

With Bud Shank

- Bossa Nova Jazz Samba (1962) with Clare Fischer
- Brasamba! (1963) with Clare Fischer and Joe Pass

With Ravi Shankar

- Charly: Original Soundtrack Recording (1968)

With Carly Simon

- Another Passenger (Elektra, 1976)

With Frank Sinatra

- The World We Knew (Reprise, 1967)
- Cycles (Reprise, 1968)

With Tom Snow

- Taking It All in Stride (Capitol, 1975)
- Tom Snow (Capitol, 1976)

With Phil Spector

- Back to Mono (1958–1969) (ABKCO, 1991)

With Ringo Starr

- Ringo (Apple, 1973)

With Barbra Streisand

- Stoney End (Columbia, 1971)

With James Taylor

- Gorilla (Warner Bros., 1975)
- In the Pocket (Warner Bros., 1976)

With Bill Thomson

- Fantabulous (1957)

With Cal Tjader

- West Side Story (Fantasy, 1961)
- Cal Tjader Plays the Contemporary Music of Mexico and Brazil (Verve, 1962)
- A Jazz Tribute to Antonio Carlos Jobim (2004)

With Various Artists

- Samba do Avião (Rhino, 2005)

With Wendy Waldman

- The Main Refrain (Warner Bros., 1976)

With Jennifer Warnes

- Jennifer (Reprise, 1972)

With Nancy Wilson

- Today, Tomorrow, Forever (Capitol, 1964)

With Paul Winter

- Icarus (1972)

=== Soundtracks ===
- Peter Pan (1953) (Tinker Bell's Twinkle)
- The Man with the Golden Arm (1955)
- Around The World In 80 Days (1956)
- The King And I (1956)
- Hot Rod Girl (1956)
- I Want to Live! (1958)
- Johnny Staccato (1959) (Actor – role "Musician" Episode title "The Parents")
- Westside Story (1961) (Bongo soloist)
- Breakfast at Tiffany's (1961)
- To Kill A Mockingbird (1962)
- Hatari! (1962) (Featured African Drum Ensemble)
- Bonanza (1962)
- Bewitched (1964) (Samatha's Nose Twitch)
- The Party (1968)
- Paradise, Hawaiian Style (1966)
- Mission Impossible (1968)
- The Man from U.N.C.L.E. (1964)
- Help! (1965)
- Charly (1968)
- Performance (1970)
- Things Fall Apart (1971)
- Dollars (1972)
- The Hot Rock (1972)
- Roots (1977)
- The Long Riders (1980)
- Southern Comfort (1981)
- Blue Collar (1995)
- Kissing Jessica Stein (2002)
- Honey West (2005)
- CBS Studio Orchestra (1941–1946)
