= Listen to a Country Song (song) =

Single by Lynn Anderson

from the album Listen to a Country Song
- B-side: "That's What Loving You Has Meant to Me"
- Released: May 1972
- Genre: Country
- Label: Columbia
- Songwriter(s): Al Garth; Jim Messina
- Producer(s): Glenn Sutton

Lynn Anderson singles chronology
"Cry" (1972)	"Listen to a Country Song" (1972)	"Fool Me" (1972)

"Listen to a Country Song" is a song written by Al Garth and Jim Messina. It was originally recorded by Loggins and Messina on their 1971 album Sittin' In. Drummer Merel Bregante is using brushes on his drum kit rather than sticks, which helps to reflect the country feel of the song, Al Garth is playing violin and Michael Omartian is playing both tack piano and grand piano.

The song was first released as a single by American country music artist Lynn Anderson. Released in May 1972, it was the second single from her album Listen to a Country Song. The song peaked at number 4 on the Billboard Hot Country Singles chart. It also reached number 1 on the RPM Country Tracks chart in Canada.

Kikki Danielsson covered the song on her 1981 album Just Like a Woman.

== Personnel ==
Loggins & Messina

- Jim Messina - lead vocals, electric guitar
- Kenny Loggins - harmony vocals, electric guitar
- Al Garth - violin
- Larry Sims - backing vocals, bass
- Merel Bregante - backing vocals, brushed drums
- Michael Omartian - piano, tack piano

== Chart performance ==
Chart (1972)	Peak position
U.S. Billboard Hot Country Singles	4
U.S. Billboard Bubbling Under Hot 100	7
Canadian RPM Country Tracks	1
