= Jim Messina (musician) =

American musician (born 1947)

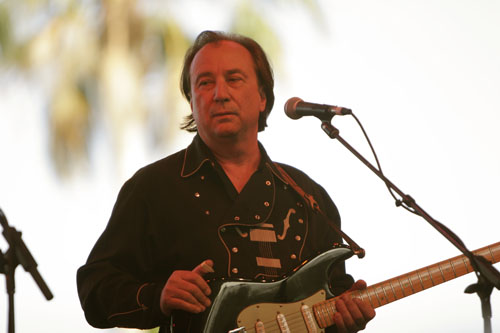
- Messina in 2009

Background information
- Born: James Messina; December 5, 1947 (age 78); Maywood, California, U.S.
- Genres: Country rock; folk rock; Latin rock; soft rock; jazz
- Occupations: Musician; record producer
- Instruments: Guitar; mandolin; vocals; bass
- Years active: 1964–present
- Formerly of: Jim Messina and His Jesters; Buffalo Springfield; Poco; Loggins and Messina
- Spouse(s): Jenny Sullivan (1970-1980; divorced); Michaela Laza
- Website: Official website

James Messina (born December 5, 1947) is an American musician, songwriter, singer, guitarist, recording engineer, and record producer. He was a member of the folk rock group Buffalo Springfield and the soft rock duo Loggins and Messina with Kenny Loggins.

== Early life ==
James Messina was born in Maywood, California on December 5, 1947, and raised in Harlingen, Texas until he was eight. He spent much of his childhood split between his father's home in California and his mother's home in Texas.

His father was a guitarist and greatly influenced his son's musical career. Messina began playing the guitar at the age of five. He later became interested in the music of Elvis Presley and Ricky Nelson.

== Career ==
=== Jim Messina and His Jesters ===
When he was 16 years old, he recorded an LP with "His Jesters" titled The Dragsters, which was released in November 1964. One notable track was "The Jester", on which he played lead guitar; it was included on the 2003 CD Lost Legends of Surf Guitar Volume 1.

=== Buffalo Springfield ===
While with Buffalo Springfield, Messina served as a recording engineer, producer and musician, replacing bass player Bruce Palmer on two songs from their final album, Last Time Around.

=== Poco ===
After Buffalo Springfield disbanded, Messina and Richie Furay, a founding member of Buffalo Springfield, formed Poco in 1968. Switching back from bass to guitar, Messina played lead guitar and supplied vocals and some songwriting to the band. After recording two studio albums and one live album, he left Poco due to exhaustion from touring and to focus on becoming a record producer.

=== Loggins and Messina ===
After Poco, Messina signed a contract with Columbia Records as an independent producer. Messina was first introduced to the idea of producing Kenny Loggins in the summer of 1970 while still performing on the road with Poco. Loggins first met Messina in December 1970 at Messina's home, where the two recorded several Loggins compositions in Messina's living room. When deciding how to produce Loggins' first solo album, Messina met with Clive Davis, then president of Columbia Records. Messina proposed to Davis that he be allowed to sit in with Loggins on his first solo album in the same way jazz artists had done in the past and stated that Loggins also needed more upbeat and diverse material to help him gain appeal as a pop music artist. After reluctantly agreeing, Davis pursued the "Sitting In" concept. With music trends moving away from folk, Messina presented Loggins with several songs that spilled over from his days with Poco and Buffalo Springfield. He felt Loggins could do both country rock and R&B styles exceptionally well, especially after hearing Loggins perform "Danny's Song."

Among the material Messina contributed was "Listen to a Country Song" (which would be a hit single for Lynn Anderson when she recorded it the following year), "Nobody But You," "Same Old Wine," and "The Trilogy," which included "Peace of Mind". He provided the rehearsal space, amps, and instruments and lent his talents as an arranger, vocalist, and guitarist. Messina worked long hours with Loggins and encouraged him to purchase an electric guitar and play it on his solo debut album.

Messina assembled "The Kenny Loggins Band" by summoning old friends drummer Merel Bregante and bassist/singer Larry Sims (both formerly of The Sunshine Company), multireedist/violinist Al Garth, multireedist Jon Clarke (performing with the Don Ellis Jazz Band) and a friend of Loggins, keyboardist Michael Omartian, who played on the album but dropped out once touring began. However, Omartian played on the next two albums and the ensemble was also augmented on each of their studio releases by Los Angeles-based session percussionist Milt Holland.

Though the album was initially intended to be Loggins' first solo album, the two decided that Messina's contribution was so substantial that the album was finally released as Kenny Loggins with Jim Messina Sittin' In in November 1971. Messina had been reluctant to perform and tour having begun collaborating with the sole interest of producing. Nonetheless, by the end of 1972, the group, now renamed "Loggins and Messina", had toured extensively and they would eventually sell over 20 million albums.

After the release of Sittin' In, Messina went on to write, perform and produce seven more albums with Loggins. Those albums were Loggins and Messina (1972), Full Sail (1973), On Stage (1974), Mother Lode (1974), So Fine (1975, a covers album), Native Sons (1976, their last studio release) and Finale (1977, released by Columbia after the duo's split).

Loggins ultimately decided to strike out on his own and in 1976 the duo split after a final concert in Hawaii. Both went on to solo careers.

=== Solo career, 1976–1993 ===
In 1979, Messina met with Don Ellis (not to be confused with Don Ellis the jazz musician who recorded for the same label) of Columbia Records subsidiary A&R to plan his first solo album. He learned that Ellis did not like Messina's new musical direction, towards Latin jazz with a rock edge, because it did not sound like a Loggins and Messina album. Messina toured to support the debut LP, which sold 150,000 copies, about the same sales as Sittin' In. However, without the record company's support, the album stalled, peaking at #58 on the Billboard 200 so Messina asked Columbia Records president Bruce Lundvall for a release from the label. The album's single, "New and Different Way", slightly missed the Top 40 on the AC chart, peaking at #43.

In 1981, Messina signed with Warner Bros. Records and recorded and released his second solo effort, Messina, which included folk, rock, Latin and light jazz elements. The album featured singer Pauline Wilson, who sang a duet with Messina on "Stay the Night".

In 1983, Messina released his third solo album with Warner Bros., One More Mile. The album leaned more toward rock and Messina used several young and upcoming studio musicians as his rhythm section. The album also featured Edie Laymen and Pauline Wilson singing background and harmony parts. In the song "The Island", he shows his influence of slack key, a Hawaiian style of playing guitar.

In 1993, Brooks and Dunn recorded "Mexican Minutes" written by Messina and co-authored with Kent Robbins in Nashville.

=== Reunion tours ===
In 1989, Poco's original lineup (consisting of Messina, Richie Furay, Rusty Young, George Grantham, and Randy Meisner) regrouped for a successful reunion tour. That same year, they released the album Legacy. Messina played guitar and mandolin on the album. He wrote and sang on three of the songs: "Follow Your Dreams", "Look Within" and "Lovin' You Every Minute." He also co-wrote the song "Call It Love, " sung by Rusty Young. That song reached number 18 on the Billboard Hot 100 in August 1989.

In 2005, Messina and Loggins hit the road as a duo again. They had a successful nationwide tour that produced a CD and DVD entitled Live: Sittin' In Again at the Santa Barbara Bowl. Messina also pulled from the vaults the original master analog recordings that he had produced and mixed for Loggins and Messina at Columbia Records, which were released as the 2005 digitally mastered compilation album The Best: Sittin' in Again. The duo reformed again in 2009 for an extensive tour.

=== Recent solo career ===
Jim Messina and the Road Runners performing at the Newberry Opera House in October 2026

In 2009, Messina released the CD Under a Mojito Moon-Part 1, on which the only guitar he played was his flamenco guitar. The Latin-based arrangements feature trumpet, percussion, drums, piano, and nylon acoustic guitar in melodies reminiscent of the music of Cuba and Spain.

In 2012, Messina released the CD and DVD Jim Messina LIVE at the Clark Center for the Performing Arts containing songs by Buffalo Springfield, Poco, Loggins & Messina, and his solo material.

In 2025, he toured with his band The Road Runners. They released a live album Here, There and Everywhere that same year.

He continues to work in publishing, production, and electronics as a recording and mixing engineer and as a recording studio owner, as well as performing on tour.

He is both the creator and facilitator of "The Songwriters' Performance Workshop", wherein he leads 6-day intensive workshops for songwriters and singers at retreats, resorts, and hotels around the country.

== Personal life and family ==
In 1970, Messina wed actress Jenny Sullivan but the marriage ended 10 years later in 1980. They had no children. Messina has a son, recording engineer and musician Julian Messina (born 1992), from a relationship in the early 1990s. In 2001, Messina met his second wife, Michaela Laza Messina, an opera singer and a music teacher. They have a daughter, Josey (born 2006). Messina currently resides near Franklin, Tennessee.

== Discography ==
=== Jim Messina and His Jesters ===
- The Dragsters (1964)

=== Buffalo Springfield ===
- Last Time Around (1968)

=== Poco ===
- Pickin' Up the Pieces (1969)
- Poco (1970)
- Deliverin' (1971)
- Legacy (1989)

=== Loggins and Messina ===
- Sittin' In (1971)
- Loggins & Messina (1972)
- Full Sail (1973)
- On Stage (1974)
- Mother Lode (1974)
- So Fine (1975)
- Native Sons (1976)
- Finale (1976)
- The Best of Friends (1977)

=== Jim Messina ===
- Oasis (1979)
- Messina (1981)
- One More Mile (1983)
- Watching the River Run (1996)
- Watching the River Run (Revisited) (2005)
- Under a Mojito Moon Part 1 (2009)
- "Live" at the Clark Center for the Performing Arts (2012)
- In the Groove (2017)
- Here, There and Everywhere (2025)

=== Jim Messina solo singles ===
- "New and Different Way" (1979)
- "Do You Want to Dance" (1980)
- "Stay the Night" (1981)
