= Kenny Loggins =

American musician (born 1948)

- Loggins in 2026

Background information
- Born: Kenneth Clark Loggins; January 7, 1948 (age 78); Everett, Washington, US
- Genres: Rock; pop; folk rock; R&B; soul; soft rock
- Occupations: Singer; musician; songwriter
- Instruments: Vocals; guitar; harmonica
- Years active: 1966–present
- Labels: Columbia; Mercury; Walt Disney
- Member of: Blue Sky Riders
- Formerly of: The Second Helping; The Electric Prunes; Loggins and Messina
- Spouses: Eva Ein (m. 1978; div. 1990) Julia Cooper (m. 1992; div. 2004)
- Website: kennyloggins.com

Kenneth Clark Loggins (born January 7, 1948) is an American singer, songwriter and guitarist. His early songs were recorded with the Nitty Gritty Dirt Band in 1970, which led to seven albums recorded with Jim Messina as Loggins and Messina from 1972 to 1977. His early soundtrack contributions date back to A Star Is Born in 1976, and he is known as the "King of the Movie Soundtrack". As a solo artist, Loggins experienced a string of soundtrack successes, including an Academy Award nomination for "Footloose" in 1985. Finally Home was released in 2013, shortly after Loggins formed the group Blue Sky Riders with Gary Burr and Georgia Middleman. He has won two Grammy Awards and a Daytime Emmy Award; and was nominated for an Academy Award, a Tony Award, and a Golden Globe Award.

== Background ==
Loggins was born in Everett, Washington, the youngest of three brothers. His father, Robert George Loggins, a salesman, was of English and Irish ancestry, while his mother, Lina (née Massie), was a homemaker of Italian descent, from Avezzano. They lived in Detroit and Seattle before settling in Alhambra, California. According to his biography, Loggins was born on the birthday of his brother, Bobby. As such, and allowing him to keep a Christmas promise his father had made his brother, Bobby got to name his new brother Clark Kent Loggins. Later, his first and middle names were flipped, and Kent was changed to Kenneth.

Loggins attended San Gabriel Mission High School, graduating in 1966.

== Early musical career ==
=== The Second Helping ===
Loggins was the lead singer and rhythm guitarist of The Second Helping, a band from Alhambra, California. They would release three singles during 1968 and 1969 on Viva Records. The group also included Lawrence Williams who would later find fame as a songwriter.

Working with producer John MacQuarrie, the group recorded "Let Me In" and "Hard Times" which was released on single, Viva V-603 in 1966. In January 1967, they released the MacQuarrie-produced single, "Floating Downstream on an Inflatable Rubber Raft" bw "On Friday" on Viva 605. The single was Top 60 Spotlight in the January 14 issue of Billboard. According to the reviewer, it was one to watch and it could establish the group. It was also a four-star pick in the January 21 issue of Record World with the reviewer making note of its teen appeal. It was also one of the Cash Box Newcomer Picks. Working again with producer MacQuarrie, the group recorded "Don't You Remember the Good Times" and "Children of the Night" which were released on Viva 613. It was given a four-star rating in the August 26, 1967 issue of Record World. The reviewer wrote that this song about bad romance would have the buyers going for it.

Greg Shaw described the efforts as "excellent punky folk-pop records" that were written by Loggins who was likely to be the bandleader and singer as well; Shaw included "Let Me In" on both Highs in the Mid-Sixties, Volume 2 and the Pebbles, Volume 9 CD.

=== Further activities ===
Loggins had a short gig playing guitar for the New Improved Electric Prunes in 1969 before writing four songs for the Nitty Gritty Dirt Band that were included on their album Uncle Charlie & His Dog Teddy. During his early 20s, he was in the band Gator Creek with Mike Deasy. The first recorded version of "Danny's Song" (later recorded by Loggins and Messina and a No. 7 Hot 100 hit for Anne Murray in 1973) was included on their only album, released on Mercury Records.

== Loggins and Messina ==
Jim Messina, formerly of Poco and Buffalo Springfield, was working as an independent record producer for Columbia Records in 1970 when he was introduced to Loggins, then a little-known singer-songwriter who was signed to ABC-Dunhill.

The two recorded a number of Loggins's compositions in Messina's home living room. When Columbia signed Loggins (with Messina's help) to a six-album contract, recording began in earnest for Loggins's debut album, with Messina as producer. He assembled The Kenny Loggins Band by summoning his old friends bassist Larry Sims and drummer Merel Bregante (both formerly of the Sunshine Company, a disbanded 1960s group from Los Angeles), violinist/multireedist Al Garth, and multireedist Jon Clarke. Keyboardist Michael Omartian also played on the album and, despite dropping out at the start of the touring, continued to play keyboards on the next two albums. Los Angeles–based session percussionist Milt Holland, described by Messina as an ethnomusicologist, also contributed.

Messina originally intended to lend his name to the Loggins project only to help introduce the unknown Loggins to Messina's well-established Buffalo Springfield and Poco audiences. However, by the time the album was completed, Messina had contributed so much to the album in terms of songwriting, arrangement, instrumentation, and vocals that an "accidental" duo was born. Thus, the full name of their first album was Kenny Loggins with Jim Messina Sittin' In. The album's first single release, the Caribbean-flavored "Vahevala", found top 3 success on WCFL on May 18, 1972.

A publicity photo, c. 1980

Although the album went unnoticed by radio upon release, it eventually found success by fall 1972, particularly on college campuses where the pair toured heavily. Loggins and Messina's vocal harmonies meshed so well that what was begun as a one-off album became an entity in itself. Audiences regarded the pair as a genuine duo rather than as a solo act with a well-known producer. Instead of continuing to produce Loggins as a solo performer, they decided to record as a duo, Loggins & Messina.

"When our first album, 'Sittin' In', came out, we started receiving a lot of excitement about the music and good sales", Messina recalled in 2005.

We had a choice. It was either I now go on and continue to produce him and we do the solo career or we stay together and let this work. For me, I did not desire to go back out on the road. I had had enough of that and I wanted to produce records. But Clive Davis (then president of the record company) intervened and said, "You know, I think you'd be making a mistake if you guys didn't take this opportunity. Things like this only happen once in a lifetime. It may merit you sleeping on it overnight and making a decision that will be in your best interest." He was absolutely correct. Kenny made the decision as well. It delayed his solo career, but it gave him an opportunity, I think, to have one.

Both members of the duo were guitarists: Loggins played acoustic and electric rhythm guitar and harmonica; and Messina played lead acoustic and electric guitar, mandolin, and Dobro. Over the next four years, they produced five more albums of original material in the studio, plus one album of covers of other artists' material and two live albums. They sold 16 million records and were the most successful duo of the early 1970s, surpassed later in the decade only by Daryl Hall & John Oates. Their work also included Lynn Anderson's "Listen to a Country Song", which was released in 1972 and reached No. 4 on the US Billboard Hot Country Singles chart, and "Danny's Song" and "A Love Song" for Anne Murray, which reached No. 7 and No. 12 on the Billboard Hot 100 pop chart in 1973 and 1974 respectively. The latter two songs also hit No. 1 on the Canadian RPM Top Singles chart. Later studio albums often found Loggins and Messina more as two solo artists sharing the same record than as a genuine partnership. As they both noted in 2005, their collaboration eventually became more of a competition. Following their January 1976 release of Native Sons and a final concert in Honolulu, Hawaii, on September 25, 1976, the pair amicably and quietly parted to pursue solo careers. A greatest-hits album, The Best of Friends, was released in November 1976. Two months later, a live album, Finale was released, more by record company decision than one intended by the artists, one year after the duo had come to an end.

== Solo career ==
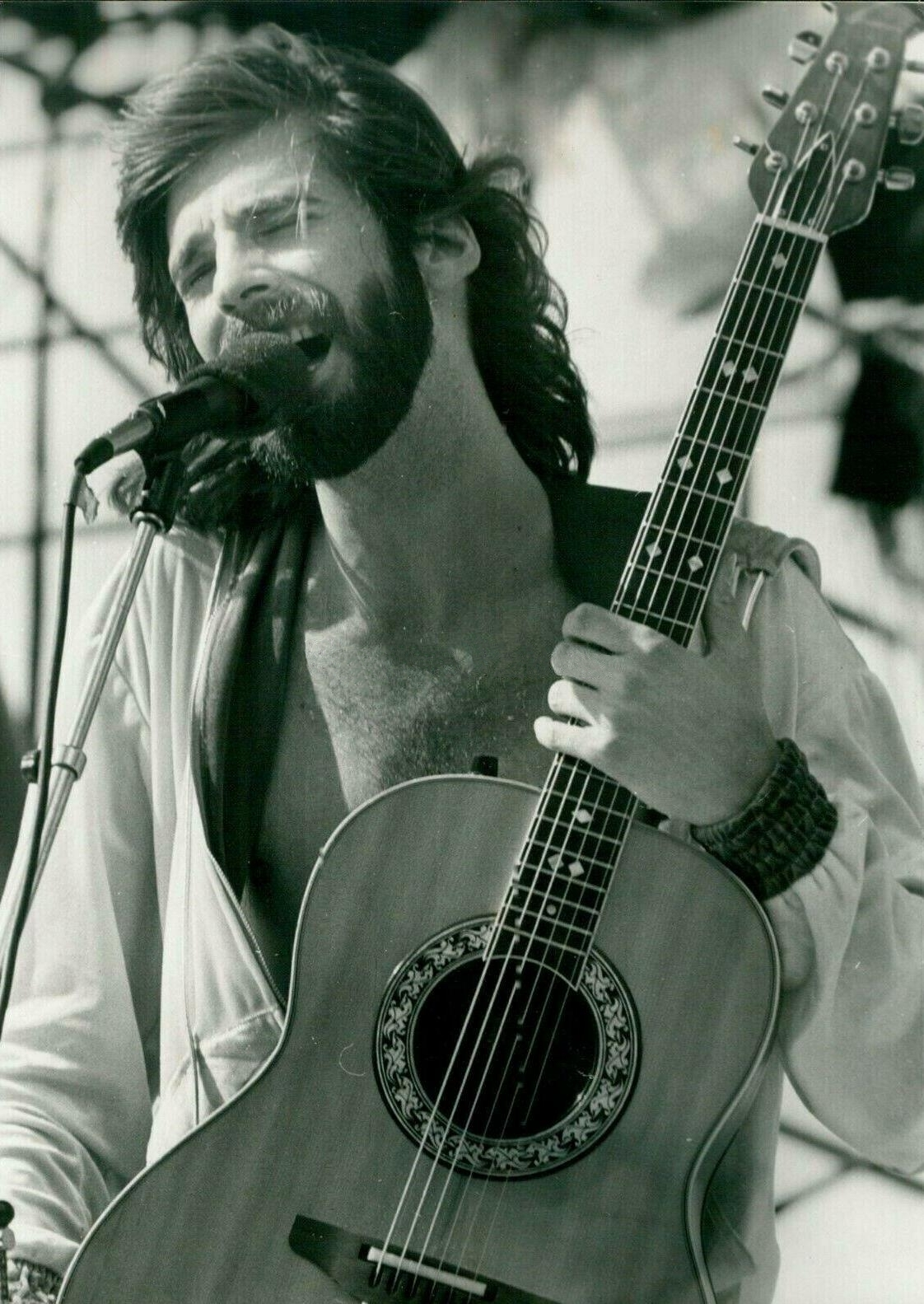
Loggins performing in 1977

In 1977, Loggins produced his first solo album, Celebrate Me Home, which included the successful song "I Believe in Love", originally sung by Barbra Streisand in A Star Is Born. Nightwatch, a popular album released in 1978, included the hit song "Whenever I Call You Friend", a duet with Stevie Nicks of Fleetwood Mac, co-written with Melissa Manchester. Loggins followed that in 1979 with Keep the Fire and in 1982 with High Adventure. The latter contained his rock duet with Journey frontman Steve Perry, "Don't Fight It", which rose to No. 17 on the US Billboard Hot 100 chart. Loggins abandoned the harmonica in his solo career but continued to play guitar, just as he had done with Loggins & Messina.

=== With Michael McDonald ===
Loggins also co-wrote the song "What a Fool Believes" with Michael McDonald. Each recorded his own version of it, with McDonald recording as a member of the Doobie Brothers. Loggins' version was released first, but the Doobie Brothers' version achieved greater success, reaching No. 1 on the Hot 100 and earning Loggins and McDonald the 1980 Grammy for Song of the Year.

In 1979, Loggins and McDonald wrote "This Is It", about summoning one's inner resources and seizing the moment. As Loggins told American Songwriter in 1987, "The best musical statements are usually the ones that aren't calculated and the ones that come out in the largest chunks. Michael McDonald and I must have written 'This Is It' four times. The first three times it was a love song, 'Baby I this, baby I that…,' and we both said, 'Eh! This is boring. This song is not working as a love song.' Then I had a fight with my dad when he was going into the hospital because he gave me the feeling that he was ready to check out. He'd given up, he wasn't thinking in terms of the future, and I was so pissed at him. It was real emotional. That afternoon, I was meeting with Michael to work on new tunes and I walked in and said, 'Man, I got it. It's 'This Is It.'"

=== Soundtracks ===
During the next decade, Loggins became known as the King of the Movie Soundtrack after recording multiple successful songs for films. It began with "I'm Alright" from Caddyshack. Hits followed with "Footloose" (his only solo No. 1) and "I'm Free (Heaven Helps the Man)" from Footloose; "Meet Me Half Way" from Over the Top; and "Danger Zone" and "Playing with the Boys" from Top Gun. Loggins also performed "Nobody's Fool" for the film Caddyshack II. He performed as a member of USA for Africa on the famine-relief fundraising single "We Are the World", which led to an appearance performing "Footloose" at the Philadelphia leg of the July 13, 1985, Live Aid famine-relief dual-venue charity concert and global television broadcast.

During the 1990s, Loggins continued his album career, including the popular 1994 children's album Return to Pooh Corner, which included the title single, a reworking of "House at Pooh Corner", written for his newborn son Luke.

In 1991, Loggins recorded and produced Leap of Faith, which included the single "Conviction of the Heart". Vice President Al Gore called this song "the unofficial anthem of the environmental movement". On Earth Day 1995, Loggins performed at The National Mall in Washington, D.C., before a live audience of 500,000.

In 1997, Loggins released the album The Unimaginable Life, based on a book he co-wrote with his then-wife Julia. Tracks include "Now That I Know Love", "The Art of Letting Go", and "One Chance at a Time". The album was produced by Loggins and Randy Jackson with background vocals by Skyler Jett, Lamont VanHook and Howard Smith.

In 1998, Loggins recorded a version of the Sesame Street song "One Small Voice" for the ABC television special Elmopalooza, which was included as a track on the Grammy Award-winning soundtrack album.

=== Other work ===
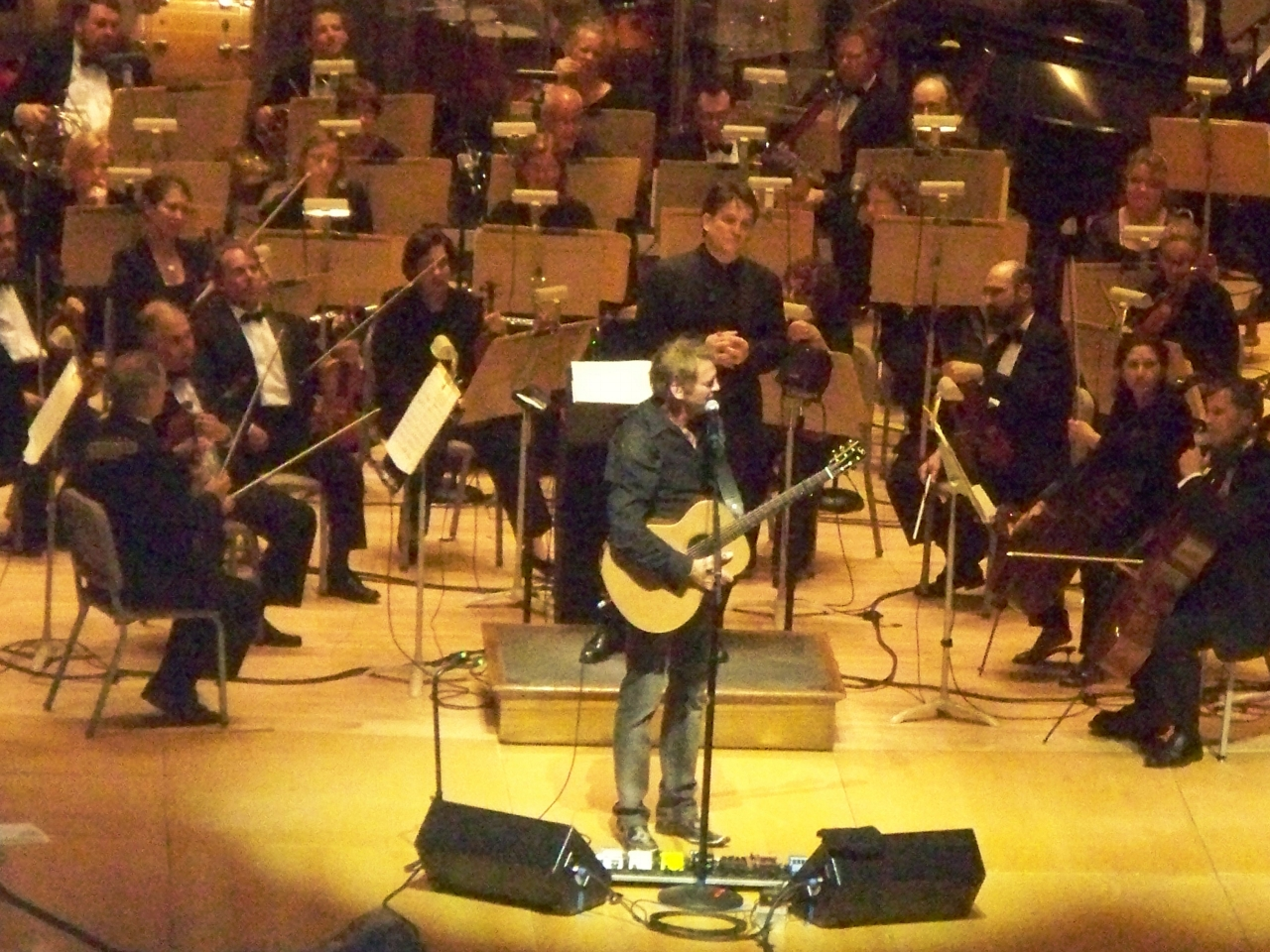
Loggins with Boston Pops Orchestra and conductor Keith Lockhart, June 22, 2011

Loggins scored a No. 1 single on the Billboard adult contemporary chart in 1997 with "For the First Time" (his Oscar-nominated song from One Fine Day). In 2000, he performed the theme song for Disney's The Tigger Movie, "Your Heart Will Lead You Home", which he co-wrote with Richard and Robert Sherman.

In 1999, he appeared as himself on the television show Dharma & Greg in the episode "Tye-Dying the Knot", performing at Abby and Larry's wedding. In 2004, Loggins appeared as himself in episode three, "Well Well Well," of Fox TV's Method & Red. In 2005, Loggins and Messina gave a nationwide tour that resulted in the CD and DVD Loggins and Messina Sittin' In Again. The tour's concerts were three hours long with an intermission and included an acoustic set in the middle. Complete with a set change that turned the stage into an old gas station setting, the show had a large IMAG video screen that showed old footage of the band, as well as tribute footage of recently deceased former L&M bandmate Jon Clarke. In 2007, Loggins joined the new recording company 180 Music for the release of his album How About Now. That year, he was also inducted into Hollywood's Sunset Boulevard RockWalk.

In 2009, he recorded a new children's album, All Join In, but it was not released due to complications with his record company. In 2009, Loggins and Messina toured the United States and Canada, reviving their "Sittin' In Again tour". In 2011, he performed a short tour in South East Asia, including Manila, Philippines, and Singapore. On June 3, 2011, he performed at the Arcada Theater in St. Charles, Illinois. He stopped by the Eddie and Jobo Show in Chicago to talk about his music, his personal life and what kind of show you can expect from him.

The 2016 parody film Donald Trump's The Art of the Deal: The Movie features an original song by Loggins, The Art of the Deal, written specifically for the film. In July 2016 Loggins performed on ABC's Greatest Hits.

In January 2017, Loggins was featured with McDonald on Thundercat's single "Show You the Way". Loggins made a cameo appearance as himself in episode 1 of season 3 of the television show Grace and Frankie. In October 2018, he received the inaugural Music Icon Award at the San Diego International Film Festival.

On September 22 and 24, 2022, Loggins and Messina reunited at the Hollywood Bowl for a 50th anniversary weekend celebration of when they played the Bowl supporting their debut album, Sittin' In. The opening set featured songs like "Danny's Song" and "House at Pooh Corner". Loggins took the second act on his own, performing some of his best-known hits such as "I'm Alright", "Footloose", and "Danger Zone".

=== Blue Sky Riders ===
Loggins is a member of Blue Sky Riders, a country music trio also featuring Gary Burr and Georgia Middleman. They released their debut album, Finally Home, on January 29, 2013. The band released a special pre-release edition of their second studio album, Why Not, in 2015 to Kickstarter backers.

== Other media ==
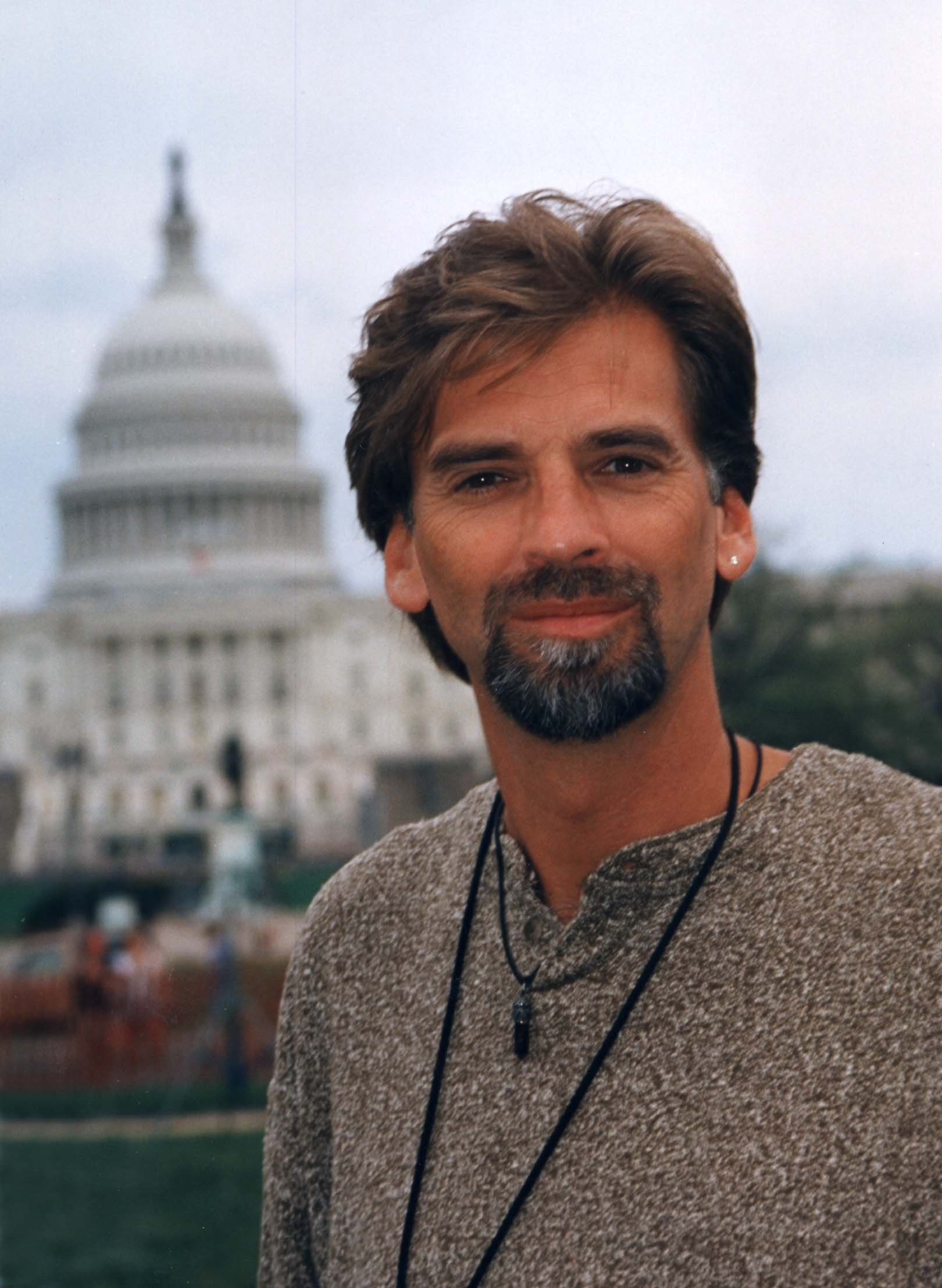
Loggins in 1995

Loggins appears in the 2013 video game Grand Theft Auto V playing himself as the host of an in-game radio station called Los Santos Rock Radio. He also lends the songs "Danger Zone" and "I'm Free (Heaven Helps the Man)" and sings station jingles. His song "I'm Alright" appeared in the game's beta files, but was never added to the full release. In its Online mode, Danger Zone plays during a setup for a heist.

In 2014, Loggins appeared as himself in the episode "Baby Shower" of the fifth season of the animated comedy series Archer. His song "Danger Zone" had been a recurring joke in the show. At the end of the episode and during the credits, Loggins also performs a country version of "Danger Zone" as a duet with the character of Cherlene. Loggins stated in a later interview that his in-show nickname 'K-Log' is a complete creation of the show, stating, "It was always a joke. That's why it works, because it's so absurd."

In 2018, Loggins lent his voice to a caricature of himself on the animated comedy series Family Guy, in the episode titled "Veteran Guy". He also voiced himself in 2019 in "Yacht Rocky" from season 18 and in 2021 in the episode "80's Guy" from season 20.

In 2022, the Mall of America overlaid their Log Chute attraction into the "Kenny Loggins Chute" for April Fools Day, with the animatronic Paul Bunyan being redressed as Loggins.

In October 2025, Loggins criticized United States President Donald Trump for using his song "Danger Zone" in an AI-generated video posted to Truth Social, stating that the video was "an unauthorized use of my performance of 'Danger Zone'" and "something created with the sole purpose of dividing us". Loggins called for the immediate removal of his music from the video.

== Personal life ==
Loggins was married to Eva Ein from 1978 to 1990; they had three children: Crosby, Cody and Isabella. In 2007, the oldest, Crosby Loggins, produced his first album, We All Go Home. In 2008, Crosby Loggins was voted the winner of the MTV reality show Rock the Cradle. Cody was born in 1983 and Isabella in 1988. As of 2009, Isabella was a music major in college.

When Loggins experienced health problems in 1982, he was referred to Julia Cooper, a colon therapist. Their relationship was limited to a friendship, but near the end of the 1980s, Loggins separated from his wife at nearly the same time Cooper left her husband. Loggins's divorce was made final in 1990 and he and Cooper married in July 1992. In 1994, they became involved with Equinox International, a multi-level marketing organization and created a promotional video for the company, as did Ted Danson and Dave Parker.

The couple had two children: Lukas, born in 1993; and Hana, born in 1997, now known as Lu.

After several years of marriage, they assembled material from the journals each kept, which included poems, songs, and letters. They authored a 1997 book, The Unimaginable Life, about their relationship. Its purpose was to offer an alternative to typical relationships where spouses feel they cannot be completely honest. Later on, they faced possible bankruptcy.

The couple divorced in 2004. Loggins said in 2009, "I got pretty blindsided by Julia's decision to leave. She's a very impulsive woman and she found herself going through a midlife crisis and she didn't know what to make of it and it changed her life."

Loggins has a home in the hills north of Santa Barbara, California, and has lived there for several decades. Loggins was a second cousin to singer-songwriter Dave Loggins.

Loggins' son Lu's gender transition is discussed in Kenny Loggins: Conviction of the Heart, a 2026 career-retrospective documentary. Loggins expressed support for his son: "There's been so much negativity and so much fear spread around people who need to transition that I felt the other side of the coin needed to be expressed, which was that expression of love. [...] To publicly accept his transition was an expression of love that I wanted to do for him. And maybe for other parents who find themselves in the same situation."

Director Dori Berinstein believes the story of Lu's transition also mirrored his father's own journey of self-discovery: "When we first started talking for the film, Kenny had the line, 'My whole career has been a journey into being myself.' And then Lu was going through that process. So there was such an amazing parallel there."

== Discography ==
Studio albums

- Celebrate Me Home (1977)
- Nightwatch (1978)
- Keep the Fire (1979)
- High Adventure (1982)
- Vox Humana (1985)
- Back to Avalon (1988)
- Leap of Faith (1991)
- Return to Pooh Corner (1994)
- The Unimaginable Life (1997)
- December (1998)
- More Songs from Pooh Corner (2000)
- It's About Time (2003)
- How About Now (2007)
- All Join In (2009)

With Loggins and Messina

- Sittin' In (1971)
- Loggins and Messina (1972)
- Full Sail (1973)
- Mother Lode (1974)
- So Fine (1975)
- Native Sons (1976)

With Blue Sky Riders

- Finally Home (2013)
- Why Not (2015)

== Filmography ==
=== Television ===
Year	Title	Role	Notes
1972	American Bandstand	Himself (Musical Performer)	"15.43"
1982	Saturday Night Live	Himself (Musical Guest)	"Robert Blake/Kenny Loggins"
1990	The Chipmunks: Rockin' Through the Decades	Himself	TV movie
1998	Elmopalooza	Himself (Performer)	Sesame Street 30th anniversary special
1999	Dharma & Greg	Himself	"Tie-Dying the Knot"
2000	VH-1 Where Are They Now?	Himself	"Viewers Choice"
2005	American Idol	Himself (Guest Judge)	"Auditions: Las Vegas"
2006	Celebrity Duets	Himself	"1.2"
2009	Caddyshack: The Inside Story	Himself	TV documentary
2012	Let's Make a Deal	Himself (Guest)	"3.98"
2014	Oprah: Where Are They Now?	Himself	"Ralph Macchio/Tia and Tamera Mowry/Kenny Loggins/Peter Scolari"
2014	Archer	Himself (voice)	"Archer Vice: Baby Shower"
2014	Raising Hope	Himself	"The Father/Daughter Dance"
2015	Penn Zero: Part-Time Hero	Montage Singer (voice)	Episode: "Where Dragons Dare"
2015	Playing House	Himself	Episode: "Celebrate Me Scones"
2015	Documentary Now!	Himself	"Gentle and Soft: The Story of the Blue Jean Committee"
2016	Home & Family	Himself (Musical Guest)	"Kenny Loggins/Jameela Jamil/Rich Roll"
2017	Grace and Frankie	Himself	"The Art Show"
2018	The Big Interview with Dan Rather	Himself	"Kenny Loggins"
2018–2021	Family Guy	Himself (voice)	3 episodes — "Veteran Guy" (2018) — "Yacht Rocky" (2019) — "80's Guy" (2021)
2020	Jay Leno's Garage	Himself	"In Pursuit of Perfection"
2020	Behind Closed Doors	Himself	"Top Gun"

=== Video games ===
Year	Title	Role	Notes
2013–2014	Grand Theft Auto V	Himself (Captain Loggins; voice)	Los Santos Rock Radio DJ

== Books ==
- Loggins, Kenny; Loggins, Julia (1997). The Unimaginable Life: Lessons Learned on the Way to Love. New York: Avon Books. ISBN 9780380975310. OCLC 779000221.
- Loggins, Kenny; Turbow, Jason (2022). Still Alright: A Memoir. New York: Hachette Books. ISBN 9780306925368. OCLC 1290014132.

== Awards and nominations ==
Association	Year	Work	Category	Result	Ref.
Academy Awards	1985	"Footloose"	Best Original Song	Nominated	
British Academy Film Awards	1976	A Star Is Born (song: "I Believe in Love")	Best Original Music (Anthony Asquith Award)	Nominated	
Daytime Emmy Awards	1993	This Island Earth	Outstanding Special Class Program	Nominated	
Daytime Emmy Awards	1993	"This Island Earth"	Outstanding Original Song	Won	
Golden Globe Awards	1985	"Footloose"	Best Original Song	Nominated	
Grammy Awards	1973	—	Best New Artist	Nominated	
Grammy Awards	1978	A Star Is Born	Best Score Soundtrack for Visual Media	Nominated	
Grammy Awards	1980	"What a Fool Believes"	Song of the Year	Won	
Grammy Awards	1981	"This Is It"	Best Male Pop Vocal Performance	Won	
Grammy Awards	1981	"I'm Alright"	Best Male Rock Vocal Performance	Nominated	
Grammy Awards	1983	"Don't Fight It"	Best Rock Performance by a Duo or Group with Vocal	Nominated	
Grammy Awards	1985	Footloose	Best Score Soundtrack for Visual Media	Nominated	
Grammy Awards	1985	"Footloose"	Best Male Pop Vocal Performance	Nominated	
Grammy Awards	1987	"Danger Zone"	Best Male Pop Vocal Performance	Nominated	
Grammy Awards	1995	Return to Pooh Corner	Best Musical Album for Children	Nominated	
Grammy Awards	2001	More Songs from Pooh Corner	Best Musical Album for Children	Nominated	
Grammy Awards	2010	In a Dream	Best New Age Album	Nominated	
Tony Awards	1999	Footloose	Best Original Score	Nominated	
Music For Life Award	2022	Winning Multiple Grammy Awards	Multi-Grammy Winner	Honored	
People’s Music Hall of Fame	2026	—	Induction	Honored	
