= Richard Marx songwriting and production discography =

This is a list of Richard Marx's collaborative work as a producer and songwriter for various artists.

== 1980s ==
1984
Kenny Rogers - What About Me

- "What About Me" (With Kim Carnes & James Ingram) (Co-Writer)
- "Somebody Took My Love" (Co-Writer)
- "Crazy" (Co-Writer)

Fee Waybill - Read My Lips

- "Who Loves You Baby" (Co-Writer)

1985
St. Elmo's Fire soundtrack

- Vikki Moss - "If I Turn You Away" (Co-Writer/Co-Producer)

1986
David Foster - David Foster

- "The Best of Me" (Co-Writer)

1987
Richard Carpenter - Time

- "Calling Your Name Again" (Co-Writer)

1988
Vixen - Vixen

- "Edge of a Broken Heart" (Co-Writer/Producer)

Tequila Sunrise soundtrack

- Ann Wilson (of Heart) & Robin Zander (of Cheap Trick) - "Surrender to Me" (Co-Writer)

1989
Cliff Richard - Stronger

- "The Best of Me" (Co-Writer)

Sing soundtrack

- Kevin Cronin (of REO Speedwagon) - "(Everybody's Gotta) Face the Music" (Co-Writer)

Steve Lukather - Lukather

- "Swear Your Love" (Co-Writer)

== 1990s ==
1990
John Farnham - Chain Reaction

- "Chains Around the Heart" (Co-Writer)

1991

Kiri Te Kanawa - Heart to Heart

- "The Best of Me" (Co-Writer)

Kiri Te Kanawa - The Kiri Selection

- "The Best of Me" (Co-Writer)

1992

Freddie Jackson - Time for Love

- "Live My Life Without You" (Co-Writer)

1993
John Farnham - Then Again...

- "The Reason Why" (Co-Writer)
- "Treated This Way" (Co-Writer)
- "Talent for Fame" (Co-Writer)
- "So Long in Love" (Co-Writer)

The Hollies - 30th Anniversary Collection

- "Nothing Else but Love" (Co-Writer)

1994
Lara Fabian - Carpe Diem

- "Je Vivrai" (Co-Writer)
- "Au Loin La-Bas" (Co-Writer)

Martin Nievera - Roads

- "Till the Day You Said Goodbye" (Co-Writer)

1995
Luther Vandross - This Is Christmas

- "Every Year, Every Christmas" (Co-Writer)

1996
Bruce Gaitsch - A Lyre in a Windstorm

- "Haunt Me Tonight" (Co-Writer)

Amy Sky - Cool Rain

- "Til Tomorrow" (Co-Writer/Producer)

The Tubes - Genius of America

- "How Can You Live with Yourself" (Co-Writer/Co-Producer)
- "Big Brother's Still Watching" (Co-Writer/Co-Producer)

Roch Voisine - Kissing Rain

- "Chaque Jour De Ta Vie" (Duet with Richard Marx) (Writer/Producer)
- "All I Know" (Co-Writer)

Fee Waybill - Don't Be Scared by These Hands

- "I Know You" (co-producer)
- "Tall Dark and Harmless" (Co-Writer/Co-Producer)
- "Shut Up and Love Me" (Co-Writer/Co-Producer)
- "The Swing of Things" (Co-Writer/Co-Producer)
- "Fools Cry" (Co-Writer/Co-Producer)
- "Surprise Yourself" (co-producer)
- "I've Seen This Movie Before" (Co-Writer/Co-Producer)
- "Dying of Delight" (Co-Writer/Co-Producer)
- "What's Wrong with That" (Co-Writer/Co-Producer)
- "Somewhere Deep Inside" (Co-Writer/Co-Producer)

1997
Bruce Gaitsch - Asphasia

- "If I Could Only" - (Co-Writer)

1998
Sarah Brightman - Eden

- "The Last Words You Said" (Co-Writer/Producer)

Luther Vandross - I Know

- "Isn't There Someone" (Co-Writer)

1999
Shane Minor - Shane Minor

- "Easy to Believe" (Co-Writer)

Monica - The Boy Is Mine

- Right Here Waiting (with 112) (Writer)

SheDaisy - The Whole SHeBANG

- "Still Holding Out for You" (Co-Writer)

Barbra Streisand - A Love Like Ours

- "If You Ever Leave Me" (Duet with Vince Gill) (Writer/Co-Producer)

== 2000s ==
2000
98 Degrees - Revelation

- "The Only Thing That Matters" (Co-Writer/Co-Producer)

Don Philip - Don Philip

- "Tenderly" (Writer/Producer)

Natalie Cole - Greatest Hits, Vol. 1

- "Angel on My Shoulder" (Co-Writer/Producer)

Countdown - Who Let The Boys Out

- "This I Promise You" (Writer)

H.O.T. - 99 Live in Seoul

- "Right Here Waiting" (Writer)

N Sync - No Strings Attached

- "This I Promise You" (Writer/Producer)
- "Yo Te Voy Amar" (Writer/Producer)

Kenny Rogers - There You Go Again

- "Crazy Me" (Co-Writer/Producer)
- "I Do It for Your Love" (Co-Writer/Producer)

SheDaisy - Brand New Year

- "Brand New Year" (Co-Writer)

2001
Natalie Cole - Love Songs

- "Angel on My Shoulder" (Co-Writer/Producer)

Meredith Edwards - Reach

- "Ready to Fall" (Writer)
- "This Is the Heartache" - (Co-Writer)
- "Reach" - (Co-Writer)

Josh Groban - Josh Groban

- "To Where You Are" (Co-Writer/Producer)

Westlife – World of Our Own

- "I Wanna Grow Old with You" (Co-Writer)

Cliff Richard - Wanted

- "Right Here Waiting" (Writer)

The Tubes - Extended Versions

- "Loveline" (Co-Writer/Co-Producer)

Christina Undhjem - EP

- "Back in My Baby's Arms" (Writer)

2002
Michael Bolton - Only a Woman Like You

- "Slowly" (Co-Writer/Co-Producer)
- "I Surrender" (Co-Writer/Co-Producer)
- "Eternally" (Co-Writer/Co-Producer)

Chris Botti - December

- "Perfect Day" (Co-Writer/Co-Producer)
- "Have Yourself a Merry Little Christmas" (co-producer)

Emerson Drive - Emerson Drive

- "Fall into Me" (Producer)
- "Only God" (co-producer)
- "How Lucky I Am" (Producer)

Marie Sisters - Marie Sisters

- "I Will Hold On (Co-Writer/Producer/Strings)
- "If I Fall in Love Tonight" (Co-Writer/Producer)

Olivia Newton-John - (2)

- "Never Far Away" (Duet with Richard Marx) (Writer/Co-Producer)

Paulina Rubio - Border Girl

- "Border Girl" (Co-Writer)

SheDaisy - Knock on the Sky

- "All Over You" (Co-Writer)

Barbra Streisand - Duets

- "I Won't Be the One to Let Go" (Duet with Barry Manilow) (Co-Writer/Producer)
- "If You Ever Leave Me" (Duet with Vince Gill (Writer/Co-Producer)

Bonnie Tyler - Heart Strings

- "Right Here Waiting" (Writer)

John Tesh - The Power of Love

- "This I Promise You" (Writer)

2003
Chicago - The Box

- "Good for Nothing" (Co-Writer)

Billy Ray Cyrus - The Other Side

- "Holding On to a Dream" (Co-Writer)

Vince Gill - Next Big Thing

- "Someday" (Co-Writer/Producer)

Kenny Loggins - It's About Time

- "With This Ring" (Co-Writer)
- "I Miss Us" (Co-Writer/Co-Producer)
- "The One That Got Away" (Co-Writer)
- "The Undeniable Groove" (Co-Writer)

Sister Hazel - Chasing Daylight

- "Life Got in the Way" (Co-Writer)

Kristy Starling - Kristy Starling

- "To Where You Are" (Co-Writer/Co-Producer)

Luther Vandross - Dance with My Father

- "Dance with My Father" (Co-Writer)

Smooth Sax Tribute to Luther Vandross

- "Dance with My Father" (Co-Writer)

2004
Kellie Coffey - A Little More Me

- "Dance with My Father" (Co-Writer)

Emerson Drive - What If?

- "Last One Standing" (Co-Writer/Producer)
- "Lemonade" (Producer)
- "If You Were My Girl" (Co-Writer/Producer)
- "What If (Producer)
- "I'll Die Trying" (Producer)
- "November" (Producer)
- "Fishin' in the Dark" (Producer)
- "You're Like Coming Home" (Producer)
- "Take It from Me" (Producer)
- "Waiting on Me" (Producer)
- "Running Back to You" (Writer/Producer)
- "Simple Miracles" (Co-Writer/Producer)
- "Still Got Yesterday" (Producer)
- "Rescued" (Producer)

William Hung - Miracle: Happy Summer from William Hung

- "Right Here Waiting" (Writer)

Kimberley Locke - One Love

- "Without You" (Co-Writer)

Donny Osmond - What I Meant to Say

- "Right Here Waiting" (Writer)

Kenny Rogers - 42 Ultimate Hits

- "Crazy" (Co-Writer)

Sissel - My Heart

- "Someone Like You" (Co-Writer/Producer)
- "Beyond Imagination" (Co-Writer/Producer)

Sister Hazel - Lift

- "Surrender" (Co-Writer)
- "World Inside My Head" (Co-Writer)

Keith Urban - Be Here

- "Better Life" (Co-Writer)

Sounds of the Seasons

- Richard Marx - "Santa Claus Is Back in Town" (Producer)

Ultimate '80's

- Richard Marx - "Right Here Waiting" (Writer/Co-Producer)

2005
N Sync - Greatest Hits

- "This I Promise You" (Writer/Producer)

Matt Tyler - Love Songs

- "Right Here Waiting" (Writer)

Ronan Tynan - Ronan

- "Ready to Fly" (Writer)

Disney's Happiest Celebration On Earth: 50 Years

- LeAnn Rimes - "Remember When" (Writer/Producer)

Dave Koz - Golden Slumbers: A Father's Love

- "Dance with My Father" (Co-Writer)

So Amazing: An All-Star Tribute to Luther Vandross

- Celine Dion - "Dance with My Father" (Co-Writer)

2006
"Bambi II"

- Martina McBride - "Through Your Eyes" (Writer)

Clay Aiken - A Thousand Different Ways

- "Right Here Waiting" (Writer)

Toni Braxton - Libra

- "Suddenly" (Writer/Producer)

Julio Iglesias - Romantic Classics

- "Right Here Waiting" (Writer)

Ronan Keating - Bring You Home

- "Just When I'd Give Up Dreaming" (Co-Writer)

Sister Hazel - Absolutely

- "Meet Me in the Memory" (Co-Writer/Producer)

Keith Urban - Love, Pain & the Whole Crazy Thing

- "Everybody" (Co-Writer)

Luther Vandross - The Ultimate Luther Vandross

- "Dance with My Father" (Co-Writer)

Country Dance Kings - A Tribute to Keith Urban

- "Better Life" (Co-Writer)

2007
Graham Colton - Here Right Now

- "Take You Back" (Co-Writer)

Kipper - This Is Different

- "When You Come Around" (Co-Writer)

Kenny Loggins - How About Now

- "I'll Remember Your Name" (Co-Writer/Co-Producer)

Cliff Richard - Love... The Album

- "The Best of Me" (Co-Writer)

Travis Tritt - The Storm

- "Mudcat Moan (Prelude)"/"You Never Take Me Dancing" (Writer)

Keith Urban - Greatest Hits: 18 Kids

- "Better Life" (Co-Writer)
- "Everybody" (Co-Writer)

Casey Kasem Presents the Long Distance Dedications

- Richard Marx - "Right Here Waiting" (Writer/Co-Producer)

New Music from an Old Friend

- Richard Marx - "Your Goodbye" (Writer/Co-Producer)
- Richard Marx - "Hold on to the Nights" (Writer/Co-Producer)
- Kenny Loggins - "I'll Remember Your Name" (Co-Writer/Co-Producer)

2008
George Canyon - What I Do

- "Just Like You" (Producer/Co-Writer)
- "Pretty Drunk Out Tonight" (Producer)
- "All or Nothing" (Producer/Co-Writer)
- "Let It Out" (Producer)
- "In Your Arms Again" (Producer/Co-Writer)
- "Back to Life" (Producer/Co-Writer)
- "Betty's Buns" (Producer)
- "If I Was Jesus" (Producer)
- "Fool in Me" (Producer/Co-Writer)
- "What I Do" (Producer)
- "Last Man" (Producer)
- "Second Chance" (Co-Writer)
- "I Believe in Angels" (Producer)

Hawk Nelson - Hawk Nelson Is My Friend

- "One Little Miracle" (Co-Writer)

Barry Manilow - The Greatest Songs of the Eighties

- "Right Here Waiting" - (Writer)

Alexander O'Neal - Alex Loves...

- "Right Here Waiting" (Writer)

Sister Hazel - Before the Amplifiers, Live Acoustic

- "World Inside My Head" (Co-Writer)

Now That's What I Call Country!

- Keith Urban - "Everybody" (Co-Writer)

Now That's What I Call Music 27

- Keith Urban - "Everybody" (Co-Writer)

2009
Daughtry - Leave This Town

- "On the Inside" (Co-Writer)

Default - Comes and Goes

- "All Over Me" (Co-Writer)

Jessie Farrell - Good, Bad & Pretty Things

- "Nobody Says No" (Co-Writer)

Katherine Jenkins - Believe

- "Fear of Falling" (Writer)

Red - Innocence & Instinct

- "Out from Under" (Co-Writer)

Kim Sozzi - Just One Day

- "Edge of a Broken Heart" (Co-Writer)

Vertical Horizon - Burning the Days

- "Save Me from Myself" (co-producer)
- "Here" (co-producer)

== 2010s ==
2010
First Signal - First Signal

- "Part of Me" (Co-Writer)
- "When November Falls" (Co-Writer)

Lifehouse - Smoke & Mirrors

- "Had Enough" (Co-Writer)
- "Best of Me" (Co-Writer)

Philip Sayce - Innerevolution

- "Scars" (Co-Writer)
- "Bitter Monday" (Co-Writer)

Ringo Starr - Y Not

- "Mystery of the Night" (Co-Writer)

Keith Urban - Get Closer

- "Long Hot Summer" (Co-Writer)

2011
Toni Braxton - Soul Pack: Toni Braxton

- "Suddenly" (Writer/Producer)

Joe McElderry - Classic

- "Dance with My Father" (Co-Writer)
- "To Where You Are" - (Co-Writer)

Twiggy - Romantically Yours

- "Right Here Waiting" - (Co-Writer)

2012
Hinder - Welcome to the Freakshow

- "I Don't Wanna Believe" (Co-Writer)

Lionville - Lionville

- "The World Without Your Love" (Co-Writer)

Eli Tellor - Eli Tellor

- "Last Man Standing" (Co-Writer)
- "Better Days" (Co-Writer)

2013
The Afters - Life Is Beautiful

- "Find Your Way" (Co-Writer)
- "In My Eyes" (Co-Writer)

Blue Sky Riders - Finally Home

- "Little Victories" (Co-Writer)

Vertical Horizon - Echoes from the Underground

- "You Never Let Me Down" (Co-Writer/Co-Producer)
- "Half-Light" (co-producer)

2014
Dave Koz - The 25th of December

- Richard Marx - "Another Silent Night" (Co-Writer)

Jennifer Nettles - That Girl

- "Know You Wanna Know" (Co-Writer)
- "Every Little Thing" (Co-Writer)

2015
Ringo Starr - Postcards from Paradise

- "Right Side of the Road" (Co-Writer)
- "Not Looking Back" (Co-Writer)

2016
Jillian Jacqueline - non album single

- "Overdue" - (Producer)

Rita Wilson - Rita Wilson

- "Say Yes" (Co-Writer)

2018
Vertical Horizon - The Lost Mile

- "I'm Not Running" (Co-Writer)

2019
Matt Nathanson - Postcards (from Chicago)

- "Hold On to the Nights" (Writer)

== 2020s ==
2020
Fee Waybill - Fee Waybill Rides Again

- "Faker" (Co-Writer/Producer)
- "How Dare You" (Co-Writer/Producer)
- "Don't Want to Pull the Trigger" (Co-Writer/Producer)
- "Say Goodbye" (Co-Writer/Producer)
- "Promise Land" (Co-Writer/Producer)
- "Man of the World" (Co-Writer/Producer)
- "Still You on the Inside" (Co-Writer/Producer)
- "Woulda Coulda Shoulda" (Co-Writer/Producer)
- "Meant to Be Alone" (Co-Writer/Producer)

Justin Fabus - Shelter From The Storm

- "Somebody Like You" (Co-Writer)

2023
Bruce Gaitsch - How Fragile We Are

- Fools Cry (Co-Writer/Producer)
- Haunt Me Tonight (Co-Writer)

2024
Beetlejuice Beetlejuice soundtrack

- Richard Marx - Right Here Waiting (Writer/Co-Producer)

2026
Justin Fabus

- Anywhere You Want To Go (Co-Writer)
