= Let the Fire Burn (disambiguation) =

Let the Fire Burn is a 2013 documentary film by Jason Osder.

Let the Fire Burn may also refer to:

- Let the Fire Burn, a 2001 album by Ha'Saruf
- Let the Fire Burn, a 2012 album by the band Art of Dying (band)
- "Let the Fire Burn", a song by Sister Hazel from 2010 album Heartland Highway
