= All Join In =

Studio album by Kenny Loggins
- Released: July 21, 2009
- Recorded: 2009
- Studio: Lambert Music Group, Ltd. and Soundshop Studios (Nashville, Tennessee); Green Street Arts Center (Middletown, Connecticut); El Dorado Recording Studios (Burbank, California); Brotheryn Studios (Ojai, California); Area 52 (Santa Barbara, California)
- Genre: Soft rock, children's music
- Length: 47:12
- Label: Walt Disney
- Producer: Kenny Loggins; Jesse Siebenberg

Kenny Loggins chronology
How About Now (2007)	All Join In (2009)

Singles from All Join In
- 1. "Two of Us" Released: 2009 (Internet only)

All Join In is the fourteenth studio and third children's (and most recent) album by American singer-songwriter Kenny Loggins. It was also his only album on Walt Disney Records, released on July 21, 2009. It was Loggins' first children's album since More Songs from Pooh Corner.

Loggins was asked to produce the album by the president of Walt Disney Records, David Agnew, who played Loggins' Pooh Corner records to his children. Loggins recalled, "He really got what I was trying to do, which was to make music that the parents would love as much as the children. So he called me and said 'I really want you to do it again, but this time I want it to be up-tempo.'" Loggins was nervous that the record would be "too kiddy", but said, "By picking really cool material that I loved, and doing it in a way that the production values were more adult, but still maintaining a light-hearted quality that the kids would love, it works."

As part of the marketing push for the album, Loggins performed live on the QVC shopping channel.

== Track listing ==
No.	Title	Writer(s)	Length
1.	"Underneath the Same Sky"	Nicole Dubuc; Andy Sturmer	3:25
2.	"All Together Now"	Lennon-McCartney	2:19
3.	"You've Got a Friend in Me"	Randy Newman	2:34
4.	"Two of Us" (featuring Jim Messina)	Lennon-McCartney	4:27
5.	"Come Go With Me"	Quick	2:58
6.	"There Is a Mountain" (featuring Hana Loggins)	Donovan	4:42
7.	"The Puppy Song" (featuring Bella Loggins)	Nilsson	3:31
8.	"You Can All Join In"	Dave Mason	3:33
9.	"Gandhi/Buddha"	Cheryl Wheeler	4:11
10.	"Long Tailed Cat"	Kenny Loggins	3:48
11.	"Lollipop"	Mika	3:20
12.	"Moose 'n Me"	Bernard; Loggins	4:17
13.	"1234" (featuring Hana Loggins)	Feist; Sally Seltmann	3:40
