= Research Turtles =

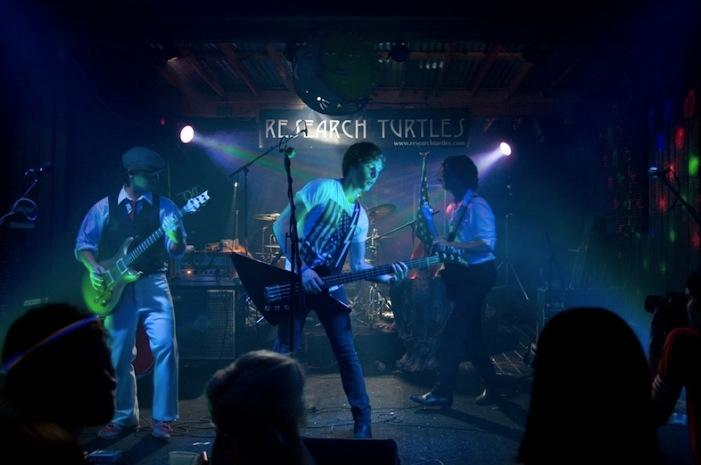

Background information
- Origin: Louisiana, US
- Years active: 2004–present
- Website: Official Website

The Research Turtles, also known as The Flamethrowers, is an indie band from Louisiana, who are known for southern rock Brit pop. They were formed in 2004 and have toured as both The Research Turtles and The Flamethrowers. The Flamethrowers is their rock cover band that plays weddings, private events, Mardi Gras balls, and festivals.

== History ==
The Research Turtles were formed in 2004 by Jud Norman. The name Research Turtles was taken from the Wes Anderson Movie The Life Aquatic with Steve Zissou. At that time, Norman formed the band to perform on his solo album Apples, Oranges. The original band consisted of members Jud Norman on vocals and bass, Joseph Darbonne on vocals and lead guitar, Paul Gonsoulin on vocals and rhythm, and Blake Thibodeaux on drums. Darbonne and Gonsoulin left the band in 2008 and were replaced by Joe Norman (Jud's younger brother) and Logan Fontenot. In 2009, Joe Norman left the band and was replaced by former member Darbonne and in 2010 Thibodeaux was replaced by drummer Chad Townsend.

The band has released a total of four albums including the solo album of Jud Norman. In 2010, the song "Let’s Get Carried Away" from their self-titled album, was awarded the International Song of the Year by BBC Radio 6 Music. The Research Turtles have toured under their current name as well as The Flamethrowers. In addition to playing their own shows, they have opened up for such acts as Toad the Wet Sprocket, Sister Hazel, and Candlebox.

== Flamethrowers ==
The Flamethrowers perform rock cover music spanning from the 1950s to music released this year. Their members consist of many of the same musicians as the Research Turtles, but also some others. Their current lineup includes Joseph Darbonne (guitar, percussion, & vocals), Dominique Darbonne (vocals & lead tambourine), Wesley Royer (keyboards), Logan Fontenot (guitar & vocals), Tyler Reed (bass), Chad Townsend (drums), William Christian (sax & pennywhistle), Isaiah Windsor (trumpet & flugelhorn), Sam Turner (trombone).

== Discography ==
Album title	Release date	Record label	Notes
Mankiller Part 2 of 2	October 2012	Normanium Records	
Mankiller Part 1 of 2	31 May 2011	Normanium Records	
Untitled EP	Never Released (Recorded 2010)	N/A	
Research Turtles	14 August 2009	Normanium Records	Track "Let’s Get Carried Away" awarded international song of the year by RadioSix International in Great Britain in 2010. Album was named Top 10 Album of the Year by Power Pop Overdose and a top Album of the Year by Power Pop Review.
Time Machine EP	18 November 2008	Normanium Records	
Apples, Oranges	25 May 2004	Wisdom Records	Solo album of Jud Norman with music performed by Research Turtles.

== See also ==
- Independent music
