= Take a Bow =

Take a Bow may refer to:

- Bowing, a social gesture
- "Take a Bow" (Leona Lewis song)
- "Take a Bow" (Madonna song)
- "Take a Bow" (Rihanna song)
- Take a Bow (TV series), a British children's television series
- "Take a Bow" (Beavis and Butt-Head), a 2023 television episode
- Take a Bow, a 2010 album by Greg Laswell
- "Take a Bow", a song by The Agonist from Once Only Imagined
- "Take a Bow", a song by Muse from Black Holes and Revelations
- "Take a Bow", a song by Sister Hazel from Release
