= All for You (Sister Hazel song) =

1997 single by Sister Hazel

Single by Sister Hazel

from the album ...Somewhere More Familiar
- B-side: "Wanted It to Be" (live); "Happy"
- Released: January 1997
- Recorded: May 8–14, 1996
- Studio: Ardent (Memphis, Tennessee)
- Genre: Alternative rock; pop
- Length: 3:39
- Label: Universal
- Composers: Ken Block; Sister Hazel
- Lyricist: Ken Block
- Producer: Paul Ebersold

Sister Hazel singles chronology
"All for You" (1997)	"Concede" (1997)

Music video
- "All for You" (live) on YouTube

"All for You" is the debut single of American alternative rock band Sister Hazel, originally appearing on their eponymous debut album. In 1997, the song was re-recorded for their second album, ...Somewhere More Familiar. It peaked at number 11 on the US Billboard Hot 100, number two on Canada's RPM 100 Hit Tracks chart, and number 10 in Iceland. It also charted in Australia, where it spent two non-consecutive weeks at number 50.

== Track listings ==
US and European CD single; US cassette single

1. "All for You" – 3:39
2. "All for You" (live version) – 5:57
3. "Wanted It to Be" (live version) – 5:40

US 7-inch single

A. "All for You"
B. "Happy"

== Credits and personnel ==
Credits are lifted from the ...Somewhere More Familiar album booklet.

Studios

- Recorded May 8–14, 1996, at Ardent Studios (Memphis, Tennessee)
- Mixed at The Hit Factory (New York City)
- Mastered at Masterdisk (Peekskill, New York)

Personnel

- Sister Hazel – music
  - Ken Block – music, lyrics, lead vocal, acoustic guitar
  - Andrew Copeland – second lead vocal, acoustic guitar
  - Ryan Newell – vocals, guitars
  - Jett Beres – vocals, bass guitar
  - Mark Trojanowski – drums
- Kevin Paige – Hammond B3 organ
- Darwin Martin – Hammond B3 organ
- Todd Schietroma – percussion
- Paul Ebersold – production, engineering
- Brian Malouf – mixing
- Erik Flettrich – engineering
- Greg Calbi – mastering

== Charts ==
=== Weekly charts ===
Chart (1997–1998)	Peak position
Australia (ARIA)	50
Canada Top Singles (RPM)	2
Canada Adult Contemporary (RPM)	8
Iceland (Íslenski Listinn Topp 40)	10
US Billboard Hot 100	11
US Adult Alternative Airplay (Billboard)	5
US Adult Contemporary (Billboard)	16
US Adult Pop Airplay (Billboard)	1
US Alternative Airplay (Billboard)	39
US Pop Airplay (Billboard)	7

=== Year-end charts ===
Chart (1997)	Position
Canada Top Singles (RPM)	28
Canada Adult Contemporary (RPM)	50
Iceland (Íslenski Listinn Topp 40)	90
US Billboard Hot 100	36
US Adult Top 40 (Billboard)	6
US Top 40/Mainstream (Billboard)	11
US Triple-A (Billboard)	4

Chart (1998)	Position
US Billboard Hot 100	76
US Adult Top 40 (Billboard)	10
