= Before the Amplifiers, Live Acoustic =

Live album by Sister Hazel
- Released: June 17, 2008
- Recorded: January 12, 2008 at Nickel & Dime Studios in Atlanta, GA
- Genre: Acoustic rock
- Length: 76:05
- Label: Croakin' Poets/Rock Ridge
- Producer: Sister Hazel

Sister Hazel chronology
Santa's Playlist (2007)	Before the Amplifiers, Live Acoustic (2008)	Release (2009)

Professional ratings
Review scores
Source	Rating
Allmusic	3.5/5 stars

Before the Amplifiers, Live Acoustic is Sister Hazel's first live acoustic album. It was released on June 17, 2008. It was recorded in Atlanta, Georgia, and includes songs from throughout their entire career. The album charted on the Billboard 200 at #152, and at #19 on the Top Independent Albums chart. An International release is available with a second disc containing five extra tracks. Three of these are live acoustic tracks and two have been taken from the B-sides release BAM! Volume 1.

== Track listing ==
No.	Title	Lyrics	Music	Length
1.	"Champagne High"	K. Block	K. Block	5:03
2.	"Hold On"	J. Beres, K. Block, R. Newell	R. Newell	4:20
3.	"Shame"	R. Newell, C. Carrier	R. Newell	3:54
4.	"All For You"	K. Block	K. Block	5:43
5.	"Your Winter"	K. Block	K. Block	4:54
6.	"World Inside My Head"	K. Block, R. Marx	K. Block, R. Marx	5:12
7.	"Strange Cup of Tea"	A. Copeland	A. Copeland	5:08
8.	"Mandolin Moon"	R. Newell, J. Beres, K. Block	R. Newell, J. Beres, K. Block	4:27
9.	"Just Remember"	K. Block	K. Block	4:09
10.	"Come Around"	J. Beres, K. Block	J. Beres	4:43
11.	"Swan Dive"	K. Block, R. Newell, J. Beres	R. Newell	4:07
12.	"Happy"	K. Block	K. Block	5:09
13.	"This Kind of Love"	A. Copeland	A. Copeland	4:12
14.	"Starfish"	J. Beres, K. Block	J. Beres	4:55
15.	"Change Your Mind"	K. Block	K. Block	4:33
16.	"Feel It"	K. Block	K. Block	5:29

International Bonus Disc

No.	Title	Lyrics	Music	Length
1.	"Your Mistake (Live Acoustic)"	K. Block	K. Block	4:27
2.	"Where Do You Go (Live Acoustic)"	K. Block	K. Block	4:21
3.	"So Long (Live Acoustic)"	K. Block	R. Newell	4:31
4.	"What Kind Of Living (Found on BAM! Volume 1)"	Sister Hazel	Sister Hazel	3:47
5.	"Sail Away (Found on BAM! Volume 1)"	Sister Hazel	Sister Hazel	5:51
