= Hung for the Holidays =

EP by William Hung
- Released: October 19, 2004
- Recorded: Summer 2004
- Genres: Christmas, pop, outsider music
- Length: 18:05
- Label: Koch
- Producer: Giuseppe D.

William Hung chronology
Inspiration (2004)	Hung for the Holidays (2004)	Miracle: Happy Summer from William Hung (2005)

Singles from Hung for the Holidays
- 1. "We Are the Champions" Released: June 16, 2004

Hung for the Holidays is a Christmas EP by William Hung, released on October 19, 2004. The EP was recorded during the summer of 2004. Like his previous album, Inspiration, the EP contains a number of cover tracks, mostly Christmas songs, as well as holiday greetings from Hung. The EP wasn't as commercially successful as his previous album and was panned by music critics.

== Development and release ==
During a performance at a May 2004 Blue Jays-Rangers game in Toronto, Hung revealed that he would begin work on a second album. He said that it "will include original songs and cover songs... There will be more bands this time. That's all I can tell you." Hung also announced that he was taking singing lessons before starting the recording sessions. When interviewed by MTV News in June 2004, he said that recording was "gonna be a much slower process than the first time. Right now I'm concentrating on just picking songs... starting to practice them and things like that." Producers submitted the songs to Koch Records, and Hung said in the interview that the label had "some ideas and stuff, and we'll see. It's still early — very, very early."

Although Hung for the Holidays was originally scheduled for release in September 2004, the release was moved to October. The album includes a hidden bonus track, a cover of Queen's "We Are the Champions", which was released as a single on June 16, 2004. A music video for the track debuted on the Game Show Network on June 15 to promote the channel's "Summer of Champions" campaign. Hung performed the song live at the Universal Studios CityWalk in Universal City, California that same night. He also signed copies at f.y.e. to promote the album.

A limited number of copies for the album included a fold-out Christmas ornament.

== Reception ==
Professional ratings
Review scores
Source	Rating
Allmusic	1/5 stars

Hung for the Holidays sold only 35,000 copies. It only reached number 22 on the Billboard Independent Albums chart, and did not make the Billboard 200 chart unlike the first album, Inspiration.

AllMusic's Stephen Thomas Erlewine gave the album one out of five stars, calling it "the cheapest-sounding record in recent memory; it sounds as if it was recorded in less time that it takes to play." He did note Hung's improvement as a vocalist, saying that "he sings with more confidence and at least vaguely sings something resembling the melody." The New York Daily News called the album a cult classic.

The EP's cover art was ranked number 2 on FW.com's "50 Worst Album Covers", saying that it looks "like a scene from ‘South Park’." It was also one of Gigwise's "Worst Christmas Album Covers Ever". In 2013, HuffPost listed Hung's cover of "Little Drummer Boy" number three on their "17 Best Worst Christmas Songs Ever".

== Track listing ==
No.	Title	Writer(s)	Length
1.	"Greeting: Thanks & Wishes"		0:16
2.	"Deck the Halls" (traditional)		1:39
3.	"O Come All Ye Faithful"	Frederick Oakeley	2:32
4.	"Greeting: Holiday Reminder"		0:10
5.	"Silver Bells"	Ray Evans, Jay Livingston	2:09
6.	"Little Drummer Boy"	Katherine Davis, Henry Onorati, Harry Simone	3:24
7.	"Rudolph the Red-Nosed Reindeer"	J. Marks	1:51
8.	"Winter Wonderland"	Felix Bernard, Dick Smith	2:31
9.	"Greeting: Hopes & Dreams"		0:12
10.	"We Are the Champions" (hidden bonus track)	Freddie Mercury	3:00
Total length:			18:05

== Personnel ==
Credits are adapted from AllMusic.

Performers

- William Hung – vocalist
- Giuseppe D. – backing vocalist
- John Franck – backing vocalist
- Alex Mejia – backing vocalist

Technical personnel

- Giuseppe D. – producer
- John Brengman – engineer
- Jeff Gilligan – cover artist

== Chart positions ==
Chart (2004)	Peak position
US Independent Albums (Billboard)	22
