= Fortress (Sister Hazel album) =

Studio album by Sister Hazel
- Released: June 27, 2000
- Recorded: February–November 1999
- Genres: Southern rock, post-grunge
- Length: 57:48
- Label: Universal
- Producers: Paul Ebersold; Richie Zito; Ralph Sall; Don McCollister; Sister Hazel (co.)

Sister Hazel chronology
...Somewhere More Familiar (1997)	Fortress (2000)	Chasing Daylight (2003)

Professional ratings
Review scores
Source	Rating
Allmusic	4/5 stars
Rolling Stone	2/5 stars

Fortress, released in 2000, is Sister Hazel's third studio album. It produced three singles. "Change Your Mind" peaked at #59 on the US Hot 100 and at #5 on the US Adult 40, and was featured in the 2000 remake of Bedazzled starring Brendan Fraser, Elizabeth Hurley, and Frances O'Connor. "Champagne High" reached #22 on the US Adult 40, while "Beautiful Thing" failed to chart.

== Track listing ==
All lyrics are written by Ken Block, except where noted.

No.	Title	Lyrics	Music	Length
1.	"Change Your Mind"		Ken Block	4:20
2.	"Back Porch (Instrumental)"		Ryan Newell; Ken Block; Jett Beres	0:38
3.	"Thank You"		Ryan Newell	3:21
4.	"Champagne High"		Ken Block	5:41
5.	"Beautiful Thing"		Ken Block	3:48
6.	"Surreal"	Jett Beres	Jett Beres	4:41
7.	"Shame on Me"		Ryan Newell; Andrew Copeland	3:48
8.	"Your Winter"		Ken Block	4:36
9.	"Strange Cup of Tea"	Andrew Copeland	Andrew Copeland	5:00
10.	"Save Me"		Ryan Newell	4:02
11.	"Give In"	Mark Trojanowski	Mark Trojanowski; Paul Ebersold; Ken Block; Bill Smith	3:58
12.	"Out There"	Ken Block; Al Block	Ken Block	4:24
13.	"Elvis"		Ken Block	3:54
14.	"Fortress"		Ken Block	5:54

== Personnel ==
Sister Hazel

- Ken Block – lead vocals (1-8, 10-14), acoustic guitar (1, 4-7, 12, 13), additional background vocals (1, 3, 5-7, 9, 11, 14)
- Andrew Copeland – background vocals, lead vocals (9), additional rhythm guitar (13, 14), baritone guitar (13)
- Ryan Newell – lead guitar, rhythm guitar, slide guitar, acoustic guitar (2, 3, 8, 9, 11, 12, 14), classical guitar (4), mandolin (4, 12), additional background vocals (9, 14)
- Jett Beres – bass guitar, Fender Rhodes (6), melodica (8), additional background vocals (9, 14)
- Mark Trojanowski – drums, loop programming

Additional musicians

- Luis Conte – percussion (10)
- Mike Finnigan – Hammond B3 organ and piano (10)
- Denny Fongheiser – percussion and drum loop (12)
- Johnathon Gilutan – piano (14)
- Jamie Muhoberac – organ and Mellotron (8)
- Bill Smith – string arrangement (8)
- Endre Granat – violin and concertmaster (8)
- Sheldon Sanov – violin (8)
- Simon Oswell – viola (8)
- David Low – cello (8)
- Kim Bullard – strings, Mellotron, and drum loops (4, 7)
- Paul Ebersold – Hammond B3 organ (1)
- Jason Fuller – Hammond B3 organ (3, 5-7, 9, 13), piano (9)
- Don McCollister – Hammond B3 organ (11)
- Emily Saliers – background vocals (4)
- Jeff Savage – drum loops and keyboards (11)
- Count M'Butu – tambourine (4, 7, 9, 13)

Technical personnel

- Paul Ebersold – producer (1-7, 9, 10, 12-14), additional engineering (8, 10, 12, 14)
- Richie Zito – producer (1-7, 9, 10, 12-14)
- Ralph Sall – producer (8)
- Don McCollister – producer (11), mixing (2, 3, 5, 6, 9-11, 13, 14), additional engineering and Pro Tools engineering (8, 10, 12, 14)
- Sister Hazel – co-producers
- Mike Clink – original track producer and engineer (10, 12, 14)
- Tom Lord-Alge – mixing (1, 4, 7, 8, 12)
- Greg Calbi – mastering
- Ross Hogarth – engineer (10, 12, 14)
- Noel Golden – engineer (10, 12, 14)
- Dan Chase – Pro Tools engineer (10, 12, 14)
- Tal Herzberg – Pro Tools engineer (10, 12, 14)
- Lars Fox – Pro Tools engineer (10, 12, 14)
- Eddie Miller – engineer (8)
