= Lighter in the Dark =

Studio album by Sister Hazel
- Released: February 19, 2016
- Recorded: 2015
- Genres: Southern rock, country
- Length: 50:37
- Label: Croakin' Poets/Rock Ridge
- Producer: Chip Matthews

Sister Hazel chronology
Heartland Highway (2010)	Lighter in the Dark (2016)	Water (2018)

Singles from Lighter in the Dark
- 1. "We Got It All Tonight" Released: December 18, 2015

Lighter in the Dark is the ninth studio album by American rock group Sister Hazel. It is their first album release in nearly 6 years, and is their first album fully in a country style. The lead single is "We Got It All Tonight".

== Content ==
Band bassist Jett Beres was quoted as saying "The five years since our last record has been anything but a straight and clear path. After making records together for over 20 years, we found ourselves struggling to find The Sound; a body of work that would honestly represent who each of us were as a band and as individuals. The music that was created was our 'lighter in the dark.' The songs that form this record slowly began to illuminate a clarity of direction and creativity for us. In choosing a record title, this lyric from the song 'Something to Believe In' became the clear choice to represent our journey, our struggles, and ultimately our deliverance."

== Track listing ==
No.	Title	Writer(s)	Length
1.	"Fall Off the Map"	Ken Block, Andrew Copeland, Tim Nichols	4:02
2.	"That Kind of Beautiful"	Luke Laird, Hillary Lindsey, Gordie Sampson	3:05
3.	"Karaoke Song" (featuring Darius Rucker)	Copeland, Barry Dean, Darius Rucker	3:32
4.	"Something to Believe In"	Copeland, Tom Douglas	4:05
5.	"Kiss Me Without Whiskey"	Block	3:16
6.	"Almost Broken" (featuring Jillian Jacqueline)	Copeland, B. Dean	3:29
7.	"Take It with Me"	Copeland, Billy Montana	3:21
8.	"We Got It All Tonight"	Rodney Clawson, Chris DeStefano, Ashley Gorley	3:10
9.	"Danger Is Real"	Copeland	3:03
10.	"Prettiest Girl at the Dance"	Copeland, Montana	3:50
11.	"Thoroughbred Heart"	Ryan Newell	3:50
12.	"Run Highway Run"	Copeland, Steve Dean, Montana	3:20
13.	"Back to Me"	Rose Falcon	3:17
14.	"Ten Candle Days"	Jett Beres	5:17
Total length:			50:37

== Personnel ==
- Ken Block – lead vocals, acoustic guitar
- Jett Beres – bass, harmony vocals
- Andrew Copeland – rhythm guitar, vocals
- Ryan Newell – lead and slide guitar, harmony vocals
- Mark Trojanowski – drums

== Charts ==
Chart (2016)	Peak position
US Billboard 200	79
US Top Country Albums (Billboard)	4
US Americana/Folk Albums (Billboard)	3
US Independent Albums (Billboard)	6
US Top Rock Albums (Billboard)	12
