= Miracle: Happy Summer from William Hung =

Studio album by William Hung
- Released: July 12, 2005
- Genre: Pop, outsider music
- Label: Koch
- Producer: Giuseppe D.

William Hung chronology
Hung for the Holidays (2004)	Miracle: Happy Summer from William Hung (2005)

Singles from Miracle: Happy Summer From William Hung
- 1. "Achy Breaky Heart" Released: 2005

Miracle: Happy Summer from William Hung is the second and final full-length studio album of American singer William Hung, released in 2005. It includes covers of songs by Hung, as well as inspirational messages similar to those on his debut album Inspiration. The album failed to chart, unlike his previous albums, and only sold 7,000 copies. But similar to his previous records, it was highly panned by critics.

== Background and release ==
Similar to the two albums, Miracle includes covers of summer-themed songs by Hung, and also two of Hung's personal favorite songs, "Tie a Yellow Ribbon", and "I Love L.A". The album also includes inspirational sayings, or "Moments," from Hung similar to those on his debut album Inspiration. A 3rd album by William Hung was first announced in March 2005, and said he would be picking the songs for the album. A track listing and release date for the album was later revealed on June 25, 2005. A single was released for the album, "Achy Breaky Heart", and singer Billy Ray Cyrus also appeared in the song's tongue-in-cheek music video. The album was far less commercially successful than Hung's previous albums, Hung for the Holidays and Inspiration, with no chart performance received and with sales of only 7,000 units.

== Reception ==
Professional ratings
Review scores
Source	Rating
Allmusic	1/5 stars
Hyphen	Negative
Rhapsody	Negative

The album was panned by critics. Allmusic reviewer Rob Theakston, who rated the album one out of five stars, hoped that "Hung will fade into the mists of bad pop culture references and trends (anyone remember the Dell guy?) sooner than later. Otherwise, we'll have a rather serious problem on our hands." Mina Scott, a writer for Hyphen magazine, wrote that "William Hung is banging long past his allotted 15 minutes." Linda Ryan of the Rhapsody music service wrote that the album "gives you more of what you love to hate and hate to love about William Hung: songs that shouldn't be redone ('Achy Break Heart') and tuneless, er, timeless wonders such as 'Surfin' U.S.A.' and 'Right Here Waiting.' Delightfully deplorable!" However, the reactions of artists which Hung covered in the album were much more positive. In 2012, the album was one of IGN's five "Worst Albums" on their "5 Best And Worst Albums From American Idol Contestants," saying that a "third album is definitely one too many."

== Track listing ==
1. "Miracle Moment"
2. "It's a Miracle"
3. "Because of You"
4. "Tie a Yellow Ribbon"
5. "Achy Breaky Heart"
6. "I Love L.A."
7. "Summer Moment"
8. "Surfin' USA"
9. "Dance Dance"
10. "Just Do It"
11. "Ocean Deep"
12. "Right Here Waiting"
13. "Healing Hands"
14. "I Left My Heart in San Francisco"
15. "Final Moment"
16. "Take Me Out to the Ball Game"
