= Adult Pop Airplay =

Music chart published weekly by Billboard magazine

Adult Pop Airplay (formerly known as Adult Pop Songs and Adult Top 40) is a radio airplay chart published weekly by Billboard magazine and ranks adult-targeted pop songs. It is a format in which the genre focuses on an adult audience who are not into hard rock, hip-hop, or soft adult contemporary fare. The main genres within this format are a mix of soft and energetic adult contemporary music alongside adult alternative rock and adult-oriented pop music. It is not to be confused with the Adult Contemporary chart which contains more ballad-driven songs played on the radio. The current number-one song on the chart is "Dracula" by Tame Impala and Jennie.

== History ==
The chart was first published in the March 16, 1996, issue of Billboard; however, historically, the chart's introduction was in October 1995, when it began as a test chart.

The Adult Top 40 chart was formed following a split of the "Hot Adult Contemporary" chart due to the growing emergence of Adult Top 40 radio stations in the 1990s. These stations played a wider variety of artists and saw a faster turnover of songs compared to traditional adult contemporary radio. Songs by modern rock, dance, and R&B artists were included with artists more closely associated with adult contemporary. According to Billboard, splitting the chart "better reflect[s] the music being played on adult contemporary and adult/top 40 stations."

The first number-one song on the Adult Top 40, from the test chart of October 7, 1995, was "Kiss from a Rose" by Seal. The first number-one song on the Adult Top 40, from the published chart of March 16, 1996, was "One Sweet Day" by Mariah Carey and Boyz II Men.

== Chart criteria ==
There are 40 positions on this chart. Songs are ranked based on its total number of spins per week. This is calculated by electronically monitoring Adult Top 40 radio stations across the U.S. 24 hours a day, seven days a week by Nielsen Broadcast Data Systems.

Songs receiving the highest growth receive a "bullet", although there are tracks that also receive bullets if the detections loss does not exceed the percentage of downtime from a monitored station. "Airpower" awards are issued to songs that appear on the top 20 of both the airplay and audience chart for the first time, while the "greatest gainer" award is given to song with the largest increase in detections. A song with six or more spins in its first week is awarded an "airplay add". If two songs are tied in spins in the same week, the one with the biggest increase that week ranks higher.

=== Recurrent rules ===
Issue Date	Criteria	Ref
March 16, 1996 – June 29, 2002	Records below the top 20 are removed from the chart after 26 weeks.	
July 6, 2002 – November 26, 2005	Records below the top 15 are removed from the chart after 26 weeks.	
December 3, 2005 – April 18, 2009	Songs are removed from the chart if they have been on the chart for: more than 20 weeks and rank below number 15, or; more than 52 weeks and rank below number 10	
April 25, 2009 – Present	Descending songs are removed from the chart if they have been on the chart for: more than 20 weeks and rank below number 15, or; more than 26 weeks and rank below number 10, or; more than 52 weeks and rank below number 5	

== All-time achievements ==
In 2016, for the 20th anniversary of the chart, Billboard compiled a ranking of the 50 best-performing songs and artists on the chart over the first 20 years of the chart's history. "Smooth" by Santana featuring Rob Thomas was ranked as the number-one song, while Maroon 5 was ranked as the number-one artist. Listed below are the top ten songs and the top ten artists.

=== Top 10 Greatest of All Time Adult Pop Songs (1996–2016) ===
Rank	Single	Year released	Artist(s)	Peak and duration
1.	"Smooth"	1999	Santana featuring Rob Thomas	Number 1 for 25 weeks
2.	"Drops of Jupiter (Tell Me)"	2001	Train	Number 1 for 14 weeks
3.	"Wherever You Will Go"	2001	The Calling	Number 1 for 23 weeks
4.	"How to Save a Life"	2006	The Fray	Number 1 for 15 weeks
5.	"Counting Stars"	2013	OneRepublic	Number 1 for 7 weeks
6.	"Unwell"	2003	Matchbox Twenty	Number 1 for 18 weeks
7.	"I'm Yours"	2008	Jason Mraz	Number 1 for 9 weeks
8.	"You and Me"	2005	Lifehouse	Number 1 for 9 weeks
9.	"All for You"	1997	Sister Hazel	Number 1 for 7 weeks
10.	"Hanging by a Moment"	2000	Lifehouse	Number 1 for 5 weeks

=== Top 10 Greatest of All Time Adult Pop Songs Artists (1996–2016) ===
Rank	Artist
1.	Maroon 5
2.	Matchbox Twenty
3.	Train
4.	Nickelback
5.	Pink
6.	Kelly Clarkson
7.	Katy Perry
8.	Goo Goo Dolls
9.	Daughtry
10.	Taylor Swift

== Song records ==
=== Most weeks at number one ===
Number of weeks	Artist(s)	Song	Year(s)	Source
30	Alex Warren	"Ordinary"	2025–2026	
25	Santana featuring Rob Thomas	"Smooth"	1999–2000	
23	The Calling	"Wherever You Will Go"	2001–2002	
23	Taylor Swift	"Cruel Summer"	2023–2024	
20	The Weeknd	"Blinding Lights"	2020	
18	Matchbox Twenty	"Unwell"	2003	
18	Nickelback	"Photograph"	2005–2006	
17	Goo Goo Dolls	"Iris"	1998	
17	Miley Cyrus	"Flowers"	2023	
16	Avril Lavigne	"Complicated"	2002	
16	Tame Impala and Jennie	"Dracula"	2026	

=== Most weeks on the chart ===
Number of weeks	Artist(s)	Song	Year*	Source
75	Train	"Drops of Jupiter (Tell Me)"	2002	
73	Lifehouse	"Hanging by a Moment"	2002	
72	Santana featuring Rob Thomas	"Smooth"	2000	
71	The Calling	"Wherever You Will Go"	2003	
69	Sister Hazel	"All for You"	1998	
67	Alex Warren	"Ordinary"	2026	
65	Goo Goo Dolls	"Slide"	1999	
65	The Weeknd	"Blinding Lights"	2021	
63	Vertical Horizon	"Everything You Want"	2001	
62	Edwin McCain	"I'll Be"	1999	
62	Lady Gaga and Bruno Mars	"Die with a Smile"	2025	

*Year when the songs ended their respective chart runs.

=== Highest debut ===
Debut Position	Artist(s)	Song	Debut Date	Source
No. 8	Taylor Swift	"The Fate of Ophelia"	October 18, 2025	
No. 9	Taylor Swift	"Shake It Off"	September 6, 2014	
No. 9	Taylor Swift featuring Post Malone	"Fortnight"	May 4, 2024	
No. 10	Bruno Mars	"I Just Might"	January 24, 2026	
No. 12	Ed Sheeran	"Eyes Closed"	April 8, 2023	
No. 12	NSYNC	"Better Place"	October 14, 2023	
No. 12	Taylor Swift	"Patient Zero"	October 10, 2026	
No. 13	Alanis Morissette	"Thank U"	October 10, 1998	
No. 13	Ed Sheeran	"Afterglow"	January 2, 2021	
No. 13	Taylor Swift	"I Knew It, I Knew You"	June 20, 2026	

=== Shortest climbs to number one ===
Week reached number one	Artist	Song	Date reached number one	Source
5th week	Adele	"Hello"	December 5, 2015	
5th week	Justin Timberlake	"Can't Stop the Feeling!"	June 18, 2016	
6th week	Celine Dion	"Because You Loved Me"	April 6, 1996	
6th week	Taylor Swift	"Shake It Off"	October 11, 2014	
6th week	Adele	"Easy on Me"	November 27, 2021	
6th week	Taylor Swift	"Anti-Hero"	December 3, 2022	
6th week	Miley Cyrus	"Flowers"	April 3, 2023	
7th week	Katy Perry	"Roar"	October 5, 2013	
7th week	Taylor Swift	"The Fate of Ophelia"	November 29, 2025	

=== Longest climbs to number one ===
Week reached number one	Artist	Song	Date reached number one	Source
45th week	Maren Morris	"The Bones"	April 11, 2020	
43rd week	AJR	"Bang!"	February 27, 2021	
36th week	The Script	"Breakeven"	May 29, 2010	
36th week	Tame Impala and Jennie	"Dracula"	July 25, 2026	
35th week	Snow Patrol	"Chasing Cars"	February 17, 2007	
35th week	Dua Lipa	"Levitating"	June 19, 2021	
35th week	Glass Animals	"Heat Waves"	February 19, 2022	
34th week	Lewis Capaldi	"Before You Go"	August 15, 2020	
32nd week	Teddy Swims	"Lose Control"	March 23, 2024	
30th week	Gavin DeGraw	"Not Over You"	February 4, 2012	
30th week	Passenger	"Let Her Go"	February 15, 2014	
30th week	Billie Eilish	"What Was I Made For?"	March 2, 2024	

=== Shortest climbs to the top 10 ===
Week reached top 10	Artist(s)	Song	Date reached top 10	Source
1st week	Taylor Swift	"Shake It Off"	September 6, 2014	
1st week	Taylor Swift featuring Post Malone	"Fortnight"	May 4, 2024	
1st week	Taylor Swift	"The Fate of Ophelia"	October 18, 2025	
1st week	Bruno Mars	"I Just Might"	January 24, 2026	
2nd week	Eric Clapton	"Change the World"	June 29, 1996	
2nd week	Alanis Morissette	"Thank U"	October 17, 1998	
2nd week	Adele	"Hello"	November 14, 2015	
2nd week	Justin Timberlake	"Can't Stop the Feeling!"	May 28, 2016	
2nd week	Taylor Swift featuring Brendon Urie	"Me!"	May 11, 2019	
2nd week	Ed Sheeran and Justin Bieber	"I Don't Care"	May 25, 2019	
2nd week	Adele	"Easy on Me"	October 30, 2021	

=== Longest climbs to the top 10 ===
Week reached top 10	Artist(s)	Song	Date reached top 10	Source
35th week	Parmalee	"Take My Name"	May 13, 2023	
34th week	Ed Sheeran	"The A Team"	December 29, 2012	
32nd week	Augustana	"Boston"	January 27, 2007	
30th week	Tame Impala and Jennie	"Dracula"	June 13, 2026	
30th week	Dominic Fike	"Babydoll"	October 10, 2026	
29th week	Mat Kearney	"Nothing Left to Lose"	November 25, 2006	
28th week	Jet	"Look What You've Done"	May 21, 2005	
28th week	OneRepublic	"All the Right Moves"	April 24, 2010	
28th week	Ellie Goulding	"Lights"	August 18, 2012	
27th week	JP Saxe featuring Julia Michaels	"If the World Was Ending"	July 11, 2020	
27th week	Dasha	"Austin"	October 19, 2024	

== Artist records ==
=== Most number-one songs ===
Number of singles	Artist	Source
16	Taylor Swift	
15	Maroon 5	
10	Pink	
8	Ed Sheeran	
8	Katy Perry	
6	Adele	
6	Shawn Mendes	
5	Bruno Mars	
5	Justin Bieber	
5	Nickelback	

=== Most cumulative weeks at number one ===
Number of weeks	Artist	Source
101	Maroon 5	
75	Taylor Swift	
54	Matchbox Twenty	
51	Ed Sheeran	
47	Santana	
45	Adele	
40	Rob Thomas	
38	Pink	
35	Nickelback	
34	Katy Perry	

=== Most top 10 songs ===
Number of singles	Artist	Source
37	Taylor Swift	
28	Maroon 5	
20	Pink	
18	Ed Sheeran	
17	Kelly Clarkson	
16	Bruno Mars	
16	Katy Perry	
15	Justin Bieber	
14	Goo Goo Dolls	
14	Lady Gaga	
14	OneRepublic	
14	Train	

=== Most chart entries ===
Number of entries	Artist	Source
57	Taylor Swift	
34	Ariana Grande	
34	Maroon 5	
34	Pink	
31	Katy Perry	
30	Justin Bieber	
30	Kelly Clarkson	
29	Ed Sheeran	
29	Rihanna	
28	Goo Goo Dolls	
28	Train	

=== Additional artist achievements ===
- Shawn Mendes is the first artist to have four songs hit number one on the chart before age 20.
- Bruno Mars holds the record for longest break between number ones, with nine years, eight months and three weeks between "Uptown Funk" and "Die with a Smile".
- Taylor Swift is the first artist to have three songs in the chart's top 10 simultaneously, with "Opalite", "The Fate of Ophelia", and "Elizabeth Taylor" at numbers 8, 9, and 10, respectively.

== See also ==
- List of artists who reached number one on the Billboard Adult Top 40
- Adult Contemporary
- Pop Airplay
