= ...Somewhere More Familiar =

Studio album by Sister Hazel
- Released: February 25, 1997
- Genre: Jangle pop; pop rock
- Length: 51:54
- Label: Universal
- Producer: Paul Ebersold

Sister Hazel chronology
Sister Hazel (1994)	...Somewhere More Familiar (1997)	Fortress (2000)

Singles from ...Somewhere More Familiar
- 1. "All for You" Released: January 1997; 2. "Concede" Released: 1997; 3. "Happy" Released: 1998

Professional ratings
Review scores
Source	Rating
Allmusic	4/5 stars

...Somewhere More Familiar is the second studio album by the American alternative rock band Sister Hazel, released in 1997 by Universal Records. Although it only peaked at #47 in the U.S., it went platinum, selling over a million copies. This album contains a re-recorded and more well known version of "All for You", which is Sister Hazel's biggest hit to date, hitting #11 on the Billboard Hot 100. "We'll Find It" was included in the soundtrack for the film The Wedding Planner, starring Jennifer Lopez and Matthew McConaughey. The title of the album comes from a lyric in said song.

== Track listing ==
All songs written and arranged by Sister Hazel (Ken Block, Andrew Copeland, Ryan Newell, Jett Beres, Mark Trojanowski)

No.	Title	Length
1.	"Just Remember"	4:37
2.	"Happy"	3:40
3.	"All for You" (Full Band Version)	3:39
4.	"Look to the Children"	4:27
5.	"Wanted It to Be"	4:53
6.	"Think About Me"	3:08
7.	"So Long"	4:34
8.	"Superman"	4:01
9.	"Concede"	3:57
10.	"Cerilene"	5:33
11.	"We'll Find It"	4:59
12.	"Starfish"	4:26

== Personnel ==
=== Sister Hazel ===
- Ken Block: Lead Vocal, Acoustic Guitar
- Andrew Copeland: Rhythm Guitar, Harmony Vocals
- Ryan Newell: Lead & Slide Guitar, Backing Vocals
- Jett Beres: Bass, Backing Vocals
- Mark Trojanowski: Drums, Percussion

=== Additional musicians ===
- Darwin Martin: Organ
- Kevin Paige: Organ, Piano
- Todd Schietroma: Additional Percussion

== Production ==
- Produced by Paul Ebersold
- Engineered by Paul Ebersold & Erik Flettrich; assistant engineers: Matt Martone & Pete Matthews
- Mixed by Paul Ebersold, Erik Flettrich & Brian Malouf
- Mastered by Greg Calbi

== Charts ==
Year	Chart	Position
1997	Billboard 200	47

== Certification ==
Region	Certification	Certified units/sales
United States (RIAA)	Platinum	1,000,000^{^}
^{^} Shipments figures based on certification alone.
