= December (Kenny Loggins album) =

Studio album by Kenny Loggins
- Released: October 13, 1998
- Recorded: April–August 1998
- Studio: Plantation Mixing and Recording (Haiku, Maui, Hawaii); Conway Studios (Hollywood, California); Jai Winding Productions (Los Angeles, California); Saturn Sound (Studio City, California); Master Tracks Recording; Oak Springs Studio (Oak Springs, Arizona)
- Genre: Christmas music, New Age
- Length: 53:11
- Label: Columbia
- Producer: Kenny Loggins, Peter Asher; Peter Kater

Kenny Loggins chronology
The Unimaginable Life (1997)	December (1998)	More Songs from Pooh Corner (2000)

Professional ratings
Review scores
Source	Rating
Allmusic	link

December is the tenth studio and first Christmas album by American singer-songwriter Kenny Loggins. Released in 1998, it contains several Christmas music standards, such as "White Christmas" and "Have Yourself a Merry Little Christmas," along with several other lesser-known holiday songs (such as "Walking In The Air" from the television special "The Snowman"), as well as a few Loggins originals. Musicians include Peter Kater also the co-producer, Russ Kunkel, veteran Loggins and Messina reed player Jon Clarke, David Crosby and Graham Nash.

== Track listing ==
1. "Walking in the Air" (Howard Blake) – 5:23
2. "The Christmas Song" (Mel Tormé, Robert Wells) – 4:34
3. "The Bells of Christmas" (Kenny Loggins, Steve Wood) – 5:58
4. "Coventry Carol" (Traditional) – 3:08
5. "Christmas Time Is Here" (Vince Guaraldi, Lee Mendelson) – 5:03
6. "Angels in the Snow" (Loggins, Julia Loggins, Wood) – 5:07
7. "White Christmas" (Irving Berlin) – 3:53
8. "Some Children See Him" (Alfred Burt, Wihla Hutson) – 4:58
9. "On Christmas Morning" (David Foster, Loggins) – 4:11
10. "Have Yourself a Merry Little Christmas" (Ralph Blane, Hugh Martin) – 5:18
11. "December" (Peter Kater, Loggins) – 5:38

== Personnel ==
- Kenny Loggins – vocals, guitars
- Jai Winding – keyboards, synthesizers
- Raymond Cham – keyboard programming
- Marc Mann – additional programming
- Peter Kater – acoustic piano (11)
- Dean Parks – guitars
- Larry Klein – bass (1, 3, 4, 6, 9)
- Larry Tuttle – string bass (1, 8)
- Jimmy Johnson – bass (2, 7, 10)
- Russ Kunkel – drums (3, 6, 9)
- Peter Asher – percussion (1, 3, 5, 6, 9–11)
- Michael Fisher – percussion (4, 11)
- Norton Buffalo – harmonica (5, 10)
- Jon Clarke – oboe (1, 3, 6), English horn (3), flute (6, 9, 11), recorder (6, 9, 11)
- Joseph Meyer – French horn (3, 9)
- Kazu Matsui – shakuhachi (4)
- Everette Harp – tenor saxophone (7), EWI controller (8)
- Stephanie Fife, Rogin Lorentz and Novi Novog – string trio (1, 3, 11)
- David Rubenstein – string and woodwind arrangements, conductor
- Jamie Bower – recitation (1)
- Kate Price – backing vocals (2, 8, 10, 11), hammered dulcimer (4)
- Beth Wood – backing vocals (3), BGV arrangements (3)
- Steve Wood – backing vocals (3), BGV arrangements (3)
- David Crosby – backing vocals (4)
- Graham Nash – backing vocals (4)
- Valerie Carter – backing vocals (5)
- Kate Markowitz – backing vocals (5)
- Children's Choir (5) – Hillary Brooks, Amy Gleason, Jonathon Hall, Brandon Pollard, Ian Redford and Laurie Schillinger
- Luana Jackson – choir director (5)
- Mervyn Warren – backing vocals (6), BGV arrangements (6)

Musicians (Instrumental Interludes)

- Peter Kater – acoustic piano, synthesizers
- Geoffrey Gordon – percussion
- R. Carlos Nakai – Native American flute
- David Darling – cello

== Production ==
- Kenny Loggins – producer
- Peter Asher – producer
- Peter Kater – producer (instrumental interludes), recording engineer (instrumental interludes)
- Nathaniel Kunkel – recording engineer
- Ted Blaisdell – additional engineer
- Bob Loftus – additional engineer
- Tony Shepperd – additional engineer
- Rob Brill – assistant engineer
- Mike Gillies – assistant engineer, digital editing
- John Nelson – assistant engineer
- Sean O'Dwyer – assistant engineer
- George Massenburg – mixing
- Paul DeCarli – digital editing
- Doug Sax – mastering at The Mastering Lab (Hollywood, California)
- Ivy Skoff – production coordination
- David Coleman – art direction, design
- Patrick Sagouspe – digital artwork
- Jeremiah Sullivan – photography
- Boyd Harris – photo assistance
- Bil Zelman – photo assistance
- Jeff Schock – management
