= Sister Hazel (album) =

Studio album by Sister Hazel
- Released: April 11, 1994
- Genre: Folk rock
- Length: 45:32
- Labels: Croakin' Poets, Universal, Sixthman
- Producers: Sister Hazel; Bob McPeek

Sister Hazel chronology
Sister Hazel (1994)	...Somewhere More Familiar (1997)

Professional ratings
Review scores
Source	Rating
AllMusic	3/5 stars

Sister Hazel is the self-titled debut studio album by Sister Hazel. It has also been referred to as White. The album was originally released in 1994 and re-released in 2005. While no singles were released from the album, it does contain an early acoustic version of what would become their first hit, "All for You".

== Track listing ==
All songs written by Ken Block and Sister Hazel, except where noted.

1. "Feel It" – 4:39
2. "Sometimes" – 5:19
3. "All for You" (Acoustic Version) – 3:24
4. "Will Not Follow" – 4:10
5. "One Nation" – 3:44
6. "Used to Run" – 3:23
7. "Little Things" (Block, Jeff Beres, Sister Hazel) – 4:47
8. "Space Between Us" – 5:03
9. "Don't Think It's Funny" (Block, Beres, Sister Hazel) – 3:39
10. "Running Through the Fields" (For Jeffrey) – 4:57
11. "Bring It on Home (to Me)" (Sam Cooke Cover) – 2:29

== Personnel ==
Sister Hazel

- Ken Block – lead vocals, acoustic guitar, electric guitar
- Andrew Copeland – vocals, harmonica, acoustic guitar, percussion
- Ryan Newell – lead guitars, vocals
- Jett Beres – bass, vocals
- Mark Trojanowski – drums, percussion

Additional musicians

- Rob Peck – harmonica (4)
- Jack Sizemore – guitar and keyboards (10)

Technical personnel

- Bob McPeek – producer, engineer, mixing
- Jack Sizemore – engineer, mixing
- Britton Cameron – engineer, mixing
- Mike Fuller – mastering
