= Water (EP) =

EP by Sister Hazel
- Released: February 9, 2018
- Recorded: 2017
- Label: Croakin' Poets; Rock Ridge
- Producer: Sister Hazel

Sister Hazel chronology
Lighter in the Dark (2016)	Water (2018)	Wind (2018)

Water is an extended play by American rock band Sister Hazel, released on February 9, 2018. The EP is the first part of a series of four EPs titled "Elements" planned to be released over 2 years. The second part of the series, Wind, was released on September 7, 2018.

== Commercial performance ==
The EP debuted on Billboard's Top Country Albums at No. 9, No. 2 on Independent Albums, No. 14 on Top Rock Albums, and No. 96 on the Billboard 200, selling 7,000 copies in the United States in the first week.

== Track listing ==
No.	Title	Writer(s)	Length
1.	"Roll on Bye"	Sister Hazel	3:11
2.	"First Time"	Drew Copeland, Ryan Newell, Billy Montana	3:38
3.	"You Won't See Me Again"	Copeland, Neil Carpenter	4:09
4.	"Shelter"	Ken Block, Jett Beres, Todd Wright, Newell	3:59
5.	"I Stayed for the Girl"	Joshua Dorr, Matthew Rogers, Josh Jenkins	3:10
6.	"More Than I Want To"	Block, Copeland, Montana	3:46
7.	"Elements Part I (Abilene)"	Block	1:11

== Charts ==
Chart (2018)	Peak position
US Billboard 200	96
US Americana/Folk Albums (Billboard)	5
US Independent Albums (Billboard)	2
US Top Country Albums (Billboard)	9
US Top Rock Albums (Billboard)	14
