= Heartland Highway =

Studio album by Sister Hazel
- Released: October 12, 2010
- Recorded: February–June 2010
- Genre: Southern rock
- Length: 48:54
- Label: Croakin' Poets/Rock Ridge
- Producers: Sister Hazel; Stan Lynch (co.); Billy Chapin (co.)

Sister Hazel chronology
Release (2009)	Heartland Highway (2010)	Lighter in the Dark (2016)

Heartland Highway is the eighth studio album by American rock group Sister Hazel. It is their eighth studio album, and was released on October 12, 2010, only 14 months after the release of their previous album Release in 2009.

== Content ==
Band guitarist Ryan Newell explains "Everyone in the band writes songs. What we did was whoever brought in the songs got to produce the songs from start to finish. We produced the album ourselves. We're really excited. I think it's a great record." On the website AlternativeAddiction.com, "Bassist Jett Beres describes the album as 'American road trip music' ('listening to it is what it feels like to be on a road trip across America')." Guitarist Drew Copeland says, "It's one of those discs you can put on and listen to front to back."

== Reception ==
Writing for 411mania.com, Adam Hill says of the album, "Ken Block's vocals are so warm and reassuring that if he told you the world was ending, you probably wouldn't feel bad about it, [...] the album continues its smooth journey along a well worn path of Americana, offering thoroughly enjoyable laments on a cherished love that has since been lost, "Saddest Song (Not Coming Home)" and soft rock, "She's Got a Hold on Me"." [sic]

== Track listing ==
1. "Great Escape" (Ken Block) – 3:22
2. "Stay Awhile" (Ryan Newell, Aslyn) – 4:00
3. "Far Away" (Newell, Aslyn) – 4:42
4. "Let the Fire Burn" (Andrew Copeland, Stan Lynch) – 4:08
5. "At Your Worst" (Block) – 3:16
6. "The Saddest Song (Not Coming Home)" (Block) – 4:35
7. "Where You're Going" (Copeland, Lynch) – 2:49
8. "Complicate" (Newell, Chuck Carrier) – 3:13
9. "She's Got a Hold on Me" (Copeland, Lynch, Billy Chapin) – 3:47
10. "Lessons in Love, Hope and Faith: Part 1. The Road" (Jett Beres) – 5:14
11. "Lessons in Love, Hope and Faith: Part 2. Snow Globe World" (Beres) – 4:16
12. "Lessons in Love, Hope and Faith: Part 3. Behind the Sun" (Beres) – 6:26

== Personnel ==
Sister Hazel

- Ken Block – lead vocals, acoustic guitar
- Andrew Copeland – rhythm electric guitar, vocals, piano (6)
- Ryan Newell – lead electric guitar, acoustic guitar, banjo, mandolin, background vocals
- Jett Beres – bass guitar, piano, organ (12)
- Mark Trojanowski – drums

Additional musicians

- Pat Buchanan - guitar (2-4, 7, 9)
- Tom Bukovac - guitar (1, 5, 6, 8)
- Aslyn – background vocals (3)
- Matt McKeown – organ (4, 6)
- Clayton Senne – piano (7)
- Billy Chapin – organ (9)
- Rob Peck – harmonica (10)
- Steve Cook – bass guitar (12)
- Michael Ghegan – saxophone (12)

Technical personnel

- Sister Hazel – producers
- Stan Lynch – co-producer (4, 7, 9)
- Billy Chapin – co-producer (4, 7, 9)
- Chip Matthews – mixing, engineer
- Eric Torres – engineer
- Ryan Chapin – engineer
- Ryan Newell – engineer
- Brian Gill – assistant engineer
- Benny Quinn – mastering
