= Absolutely (Sister Hazel album) =

Studio album by Sister Hazel
- Released: October 10, 2006
- Recorded: 2006
- Genre: Southern rock
- Length: 49:38
- Label: Adrenaline/Wandering Hazel
- Producer: Don McCollister, Scott Parker, Richard Marx

Sister Hazel chronology
Lift (2004)	Absolutely (2006)	BAM! Volume 1 (2007)

Singles from Absolutely
- 1. "Mandolin Moon" Released: 2006; 2. "This Kind of Love" Released: 2008

Professional ratings
Review scores
Source	Rating
Allmusic	4/5 stars
The Celebrity Cafe	4/5 stars

Absolutely is Sister Hazel's sixth studio album. It was released on October 10, 2006 by Adrenaline/Wandering Hazel Records. It is Sister Hazel's first album since departing from their previous record label, Sixthman. "Mandolin Moon", was the first single. The album was leaked to torrent websites on August 10, 2006. The leaked version was an advance copy of the CD and featured a short spoken-word track in place of "Hello It's Me."

== Track listing ==
1. "Shame" (Newell, Carrier) 3:41
2. "Mandolin Moon (featuring Shawn Mullins)" (Newell, Beres, Block) 3:34
3. "Meet Me in the Memory (featuring Richard Marx)" (Block, Marx) 3:23
4. "Beautiful High" (Brice, Copeland, Lynch) 3:07
5. "Hey Hey" (Block) 3:07
6. "Hello It's Me" (Block) 4:03
7. "Tear by Tear" (Block) 5:27
8. "Where Do You Go" (Block) 4:03
9. "Anyway" (Newell, Carrier) 3:47
10. "This Kind of Love" (Copeland, Lynch) 3:36
11. "Truth Is" (Block) 4:25
12. "One Time" (Beres, Block) 3:35
13. "Everything Else Disappears" (Block) 3:50

=== Bonus tracks ===
All of these four bonus tracks were released the following year on BAM! Volume 1:

- "Little Black Heart" (iTunes Bonus Track)
- "Cant Get You Off My Mind" (Limited Edition Online Bonus Track. Also found as a hidden track at the end of Track 13 on the initial pressing that is referred to as the Limited Edition Track.)
- "On Your Mind" (Yahoo Online Bonus Track)
- "Wrong the Right Way" (Rhapsody Bonus Track)

== Personnel ==
- Ken Block - lead vocals, acoustic guitar
- Jett Beres - bass, harmony vocals
- Andrew Copeland - rhythm guitar, vocals
- Ryan Newell - lead and slide guitar, harmony vocals
- Mark Trojanowski - drums
