= How About Now =

Studio album by Kenny Loggins
- Released: February 20, 2007
- Recorded: 2006–07
- Genre: Soft rock
- Length: 53:50
- Label: One Eighty Music
- Producers: Gary Burr; Peter Collins; Kenny Loggins; Richard Marx; Frank J. Myers; Jesse Siebenberg

Kenny Loggins chronology
| It's About Time (2003) | How About Now (2007) | All Join In (2009) |

How About Now is the thirteenth studio album by American singer-songwriter Kenny Loggins. Released in 2007, its key tracks include "A Love Song" and the title track, "How About Now." To date, it was his most recent album composed of entirely original material.

== Track listing ==
| No. | Title | Writer(s) | Length |
|---|---|---|---|
| 1. | "A Year's Worth of Distance" | Kenny Loggins, Mike Reid | 5:45 |
| 2. | "A Love Song" | Loggins, Wails | 3:54 |
| 3. | "I'll Remember Your Name" | Loggins, Richard Marx | 4:36 |
| 4. | "How About Now" | Loggins, Gary Burr | 3:59 |
| 5. | "I Don't Want to Hate You Anymore" | Loggins, Frank J. Myers | 4:58 |
| 6. | "That's When I Find You" | Loggins, Beth Nielsen Chapman | 3:57 |
| 7. | "If You Never Been There" | Annie Roboff, Loggins | 4:00 |
| 8. | "Truth Is" | Loggins, Chapman | 4:19 |
| 9. | "Too Much (Never Get Enough)" | Loggins, Burr | 3:56 |
| 10. | "This Too Will Pass" | Loggins, Radney Foster, Darrell Brown | 6:06 |
| 11. | "I'm a Free Man Now" | Loggins, Burr | 4:35 |
| 12. | "One Last Goodbye Song" | Loggins, Burr | 3:45 |

== Personnel ==
- Kenny Loggins – vocals, acoustic guitar (1, 2, 6, 7, 9–11), baritone guitar (2)
- Jesse Siebenberg – programming (1, 2, 4, 8, 9, 11), organ (1, 3, 6, 9–11), acoustic guitar (1, 2, 4, 9–11), electric guitar (1, 2, 4, 9–11), Nashville guitar (1), lap steel guitar (1, 2, 9, 11), dobro (1, 9), bass (1, 2, 4, 6, 8, 9), drums (1, 2, 8, 9), percussion (1), keyboards (2, 6, 8, 9), additional keyboards (2, 9), Omnichord (2), backing vocals (2, 3, 9), guitar solo (7), nylon guitar (8), additional programming (9), string arrangements (10)
- Mike Reid – acoustic piano (1)
- Gabe Dixon – acoustic piano (4, 6, 10, 11)
- Jimmy Nichols – keyboards (5), acoustic piano (5)
- Charlie Judge – keyboards (7)
- Tom Bukovac – electric guitar (3)
- Richard Marx – acoustic guitar (3), backing vocals (3)
- Jeff Pevar – guitars (4), acoustic guitar (6), electric guitar (6)
- B. James Lowry – acoustic guitar (5, 12)
- Jeff King – electric guitar (5)
- Will Owsley – electric guitar (7)
- Todd Hannigan – ambient guitar (8), amplified acoustic guitar (10)
- Paul Cartwright – mandolin (2), violin (2, 9), strings (10), string arrangements (10), fiddle (11)
- Randy Kohrs – dobro (5)
- Mark Hill – bass (3)
- Dave Marotta – bass (4)
- Richard "Spady" Brannan – bass (5)
- Craig Young – bass (7)
- Steve Brewster – drums (3)
- Steve DiStanislao – drums (4, 6)
- Dan Needham – drums (7), percussion (7)
- Lenny Castro – percussion (3, 4, 6, 11)
- Tom Ball – harmonica (4, 11)
- Jonathan Yudkin – strings (12)
- Crosby Loggins – guest vocals (3)
- Rachel Proctor – guest vocals (4)
- Chip Davis – backing vocals (5)
- Lois Mahalia – guest vocals (6)
- Gary Burr – backing vocals (11)

Strings on "I Don't Want To Hate You Anymore" and "Truth Is"

- Jimmy Nichols – string arrangements (5)
- Marc Mann – string arrangements (8)
- Vanessa Freebairn-Smith – cello
- Miles Mosley – contrabass
- Tom Lea – viola
- Neel Hammond – violin
- Joel Pargman – violin

Nashville Gospel Choir on "That's When I Find You"

- Bob Bailey
- Candra Carr
- Shateria Dayoe
- Vicki Hampton
- Shandra Penix
- Grisanthia Stencil
- Kevin Stencil
- Fred Vaughn

== Production ==
- Jim Brandmeier – executive producer
- Kenny Loggins – producer, album producer
- Jesse Siebenberg – producer (1, 2, 4, 6, 8–11)
- Richard Marx – producer (3)
- Frank Meyers – producer (5)
- Peter Collins – producer (7)
- Gary Burr – producer (12), album producer
- Jason Mariani – engineer (1, 2, 4, 6, 8–11), mixing (2)
- Jay Messina – mixing (1, 5, 8–12)
- Matt Prock – engineer (3)
- Chip Matthews – engineer (3), mixing (3)
- Billy Decker – recording (5)
- Bill Schnee – mixing (6)
- Trina Shoemaker – engineer (7), mixing (7)
- David Cole – mixing (9)
- James Gantt – tracking engineer (12)
- Todd Hannigan – second engineer (1, 2, 8–11), editing (1, 2, 8–11)
- Justina Powell – second engineer (1, 2, 7–11), editing (1, 2, 8–11)
- Darius Fong – second engineer (4, 6)
- Mike Paragone – second engineer (7)
- Sang Park – second engineer (7)
- William Sender – second engineer (7)
- Heather Sturm – second engineer (7)
- Adam Beard – assistant engineer (12)
- Doug Sax – mastering at The Mastering Lab (Ojai, CA)
- Melinda Williams – album coordinator
- Becky Scott – production coordinator (7)
- Jeff Lancaster – art direction
- Carl Studna – photography
- Gary Borman, Lisa Battista Giglio and Steve Moir at Borman/Moir Entertainment – management
