= BAM! Volume 1 =

Compilation album by Sister Hazel
- Released: June 5, 2007
- Recorded: 1999–2005
- Genre: Southern rock
- Length: 58:16
- Label: Croakin' Poets/Rock Ridge

Sister Hazel chronology
Absolutely (2006)	BAM! Volume 1 (2007)	Santa's Playlist (2007)

Professional ratings
Review scores
Source	Rating
Allmusic	4.5/5 stars

BAM! Volume 1 is Sister Hazel's first compilation album. It was released on June 5, 2007. It is a "hybrid" album, combining tracks from the Absolutely sessions, live demos, and unheard rare tracks.

The album includes all four bonus tracks released from Absolutely ("Can't Get You Off My Mind", "Little Black Heart", "On Your Mind", and "Wrong the Right Way").

== Track listing ==
1. "What Kind of Living"
2. "Boy Next Door"
3. "Work In Progress"
4. "Sweet Destiny"
5. "On Your Mind"
6. "Sick To My Soul"
7. "Mosquito"
8. "Little Black Heart"
9. "Sail Away"
10. "Wrong The Right Way"
11. "Grand Canyon"
12. "Save Myself"
13. "Can't Get You Off My Mind"
14. "She's Gone"
15. "Mona Lisas"
