= It's About Time (Kenny Loggins album) =

Studio album by Kenny Loggins
- Released: August 19, 2003
- Recorded: 2003
- Genre: Soft rock
- Length: 44:15
- Label: All the Best
- Producer: Kenny Loggins; Tommy Sims; Richard Marx

Kenny Loggins chronology
More Songs from Pooh Corner (2000)	It's About Time (2003)	How About Now (2007)

It's About Time is the twelfth studio album released by American singer-songwriter Kenny Loggins. Released in 2003, it was his first non-Christmas, non-children's album since 1997's The Unimaginable Life as well as his first following termination from Columbia Records while working on the album. Besides Loggins, several other noteworthy musicians co-wrote and performed on the album. These include frequent Loggins cohort Michael McDonald, as well as fellow soft-rocker Richard Marx and country singer Clint Black.

Professional ratings
Review scores
Source	Rating
Allmusic	2/5 stars
Entertainment Weekly	B−

== Track listing ==
All tracks are written by Kenny Loggins, co-writers as noted.

No.	Title	Writer(s)	Length
1.	"It's About Time"	Michael McDonald	4:24
2.	"With This Ring"	Richard Marx	4:15
3.	"Alive 'n' Kickin'"	Clint Black	5:01
4.	"I Miss Us"	Marx	4:03
5.	"The One That Got Away"	Marx	5:24
6.	"Brothers"	Doug Ingoldsby	5:53
7.	"This Is How My Song Goes"	Glen Phillips	4:07
8.	"Doin' It Right""	Tommy Sims	3:46
9.	"The Undeniable Groove"	Marx	4:54
10.	"No Other Voice"		2:28
Total length:			44:15

== Personnel ==
- Kenny Loggins – vocals, acoustic guitar (3, 6), electric guitar (3), backing vocals (6, 8, 9), horn arrangements (8, 9), all vocals (10), all guitars (10)
- Michael McDonald – acoustic piano (1), clavinet (1), guest vocals (1)
- Dom Camardella – additional keyboards (1, 2, 4, 7), organ (8), keyboards (9)
- Tommy Sims – Hammond B3 organ (1, 3), programming (1, 2, 7), bass (1, 3, 7, 8), synthesizers (2, 7), Minimoog (2), percussion (6), guitars (7, 9), backing vocals (8, 9), Moog bass (9)
- Richard Marx – keyboards (2, 4), guest vocals (2, 4), acoustic piano (5)
- Paul Garcia – programming (2), backing vocals (2)
- Tim Johnson – programming (2)
- Brian Mann – acoustic piano (6), synthesizers (6)
- Craig Young – programming (7, 9), percussion (9)
- Carl Herrgesell – Wurlitzer electric piano (8)
- Tim Akers – clavinet (9), Hammond B3 organ (9)
- Tom Hemby – acoustic guitar (2, 5), dobro (3)
- Gordon Kennedy – acoustic guitar (3)
- Clint Black – electric guitar (3), guest vocals (3)
- Phil Madeira – lap steel guitar (3)
- Danny Donnelly – acoustic guitar (4)
- Danick Dupelle – electric guitar (4)
- Doug Ingoldsby – acoustic guitar (6), backing vocals (6)
- Dan Dugmore – pedal steel guitar (6)
- Jerry McPherson – guitars (7, 9)
- Chris Rodriguez – guitars (8, 9)
- Bruce Atkinson – bass (4)
- Randy Tico – fretless bass (6)
- Herman Matthews – drums (1, 2, 4, 6), vocal percussion (1)
- Dan Needham – drums (1, 3, 7–9)
- Rock Deadrick – percussion (1–3, 6–8)
- Chris Ralles – percussion (1, 7)
- Javier Solís – percussion (1–3, 6–9)
- Darrell Tibbs – percussion (5–7)
- Terry McMillan – harmonica (3)
- Don Harper – string arrangements and conductor (5)
- Carl Gorodetzky – concertmaster (5)
- The Nashville String Machine – strings (5)
- Jim Horn – horns (8, 9), horn arrangements (8, 9)
- Barry Green – horns (8, 9)
- Mike Haynes – horns (8, 9)
- Amy Holland – backing vocals (1)
- Jerard Woods – backing vocals (1)
- Jovaun Woods – backing vocals (1)
- Glen Phillips – guest vocals (7)
- Josie Aiello – backing vocals (8), guest vocals (9)

== Production ==
- Kenny Loggins – producer
- Tommy Sims – producer (1–3, 5–10), engineer
- Richard Marx – producer (4)
- Tony Sheppard – recording, mixing
- Fred Paragano – string engineer (5)
- Emmet Sargeant – tracking engineer (6)
- Ricky Cobble – engineer
- Danny Duncan – engineer
- Bryan Lenox – engineer
- Grady Walker – engineer
- Brian Brandon – assistant engineer
- Dom Camardella – assistant engineer
- John Cranfield – assistant engineer
- David N. Cole – additional engineer (4, 5)
- Drew Douthit – digital editing
- Tom Graham – Pro Tools editing (1, 7, 8)
- Stephen Marsh – mastering at Threshold Sound & Vision (Los Angeles, California)
- Jamie Kiner – production coordination
- Ivy Skoff – album coordination
- Melinda Williams – personal assistant
- Janet Wolsburn – design
- Carl Studna – photography
- W.F. Leopold Fitzgerald Management, Inc. – management
