= Blue Sky Riders =

American musical band

Background information
- Years active: 2011-present
- Label: 3Dream
- Members: Kenny Loggins; Georgia Middleman; Gary Burr
- Website: www.blueskyridersband.com

Blue Sky Riders is a musical trio consisting of singer-songwriters Kenny Loggins, Georgia Middleman and Gary Burr. Burr and Middleman were engaged to be married at the time of the group's foundation. The band released their debut album, Finally Home, on their own record label, 3Dream Records, on January 29, 2013. AllMusic called the record "a true partnership" between the participants, and described it as "the sound of old pros playing for the love of it once again".

Following a successful Kickstarter crowdfunding campaign in 2014, the band was able to produce their second album Why Not (released in 2015). A behind-the-scenes docuseries, called All Access Pass, chronicles the songwriting and making of the new record on the band's website.

== Discography ==
- Finally Home (2013)
- Finally Home for Christmas (2013)
- Why Not (2015)
