= List of Jive Records artists =

This is a list of artists who have once recorded for Jive Records.
Listed in parentheses are names of Jive-affiliated labels, if applicable, under which the artist recorded.

== 0-9 ==
- 311 (Volcano Entertainment/Volcano Records)
- 3LW

== A ==
- A Flock of Seagulls
- A Tribe Called Quest
- Aaliyah (Blackground/Jive)
- Aaron Carter
- Agnez Mo (Chery Party/Sony Music Entertainment)
- Akinyele (rapper) (Volcano/Jive)
- Allison Iraheta (19 Recordings/Jive)
- American Juniors
- Amie Miriello
- Ant Banks
- Anthony Hamilton
- Apocalyptica
- Asia Cruise (Hitz Committee/Jive)
- Atom Smash

== B ==
- B-Legit (Sick Wid It/Jive)
- Backstreet Boys
- Bei Maejor
- Big Boi
- Big Fun
- Billy Ocean
- Blow Pop
- Bobby Johnson
- Boogie Down Productions
- Bowling for Soup
- Britney Spears
- Buddy Guy
- Bullet for My Valentine
- Brit Smith

== C ==
- Cage The Elephant
- Casual
- Celly Cel (Sick Wid It/Jive)
- Chipmunk
- Chris Brown
- Ciara
- Clipse
- Crosby Loggins
- Crystal Bowersox (19 Recordings/JIVE)

== D ==
- D-Nice
- D-Shot
- Daisy Dares You
- Damian
- David Archuleta (19 Recordings/Jive)
- DeWayne Woods
- Dirtbag (Epidemic/Slip-N-Slide/Jive)
- DJ Jazzy Jeff & The Fresh Prince
- Doctor Ice
- Don Philip
- Dre (Epidemic/Terror Squad/Jive)
- Dubtribe Sound System (Jive Electro)

== E ==
- E-40 (Sick Wid It/Jive)
- Eamon
- Easyworld
- Ellie Campbell

== F ==
- Factory 81
- Fu-Schnickens

== G ==
- Gady
- Git Fresh (Spy/Jive)
- Goldfinger
- Groove Armada (Jive Electro)
- GS Boyz (Swagg Team Entertainment/Battery/JIVE)

== H ==
- Hardknox (Jive Electro)
- Hed PE
- Hi-Five
- Hot Chelle Rae Hot Chelle Rae (RCA/JIVE)
- Hotstylz (Swagg Team Ent./JIVE)'
- Huey (rapper) (Hitz Committee/Jive)
- Hugh Masekela (Jive Afrika)

== I ==
- Imajin
- Insane Clown Posse (Battery/Jive)

== J ==
- Jacob Latimore
- Jason Downs
- Jazmine Sullivan
- JC Chasez
- Jennifer Love Hewitt
- JLS (Deal with RCA Records and Epic Records)
- Joe
- Impi
- Jonathan Butler
- Jordin Sparks
- Justin Timberlake

== K ==
- K. Michelle
- Kaliphz
- Kasino
- Keith Murray
- Kelis
- Kelly Clarkson (RCA/JIVE)
- Kevin Cossom (NARS/JIVE Records)
- Kid Rock (Top Dog/Jive)
- Kool Moe Dee
- Kosheen
- Kourtney Heart
- Kris Allen (19 Recordings/JIVE)
- KRS-One

== L ==
- La Toya Jackson
- Lesley Roy
- Lil' Mama (Familiar Faces/JIVE)
- Living Things
- Livvi Franc
- Locnville
- Luke

== M ==
- Mademoiselle Juliette
- Mama's Boys
- Mark Shreeve (Jive Electro)
- Marvin Sease
- Marvin Sease (Zomba/Jive)
- Jazzy Jeff
- Melissa Lefton
- Mic Vandalz (Zomba/Jive)
- Mickey Factz (Battery/JIVE)
- Miguel
- Millie Jackson
- Mobb Deep (Infamous/Jive)
- Mr. Lee
- Ms. Melodie
- Mullage (From The Ground Up/JIVE)
- Mýa
- Mystikal
- Mario

== N ==
- N-Dubz
- 'N Sync (Until their hiatus in 2002)
- Newtrament
- Nick Cannon
- Nick Carter
- Nick Lachey
- Nikki Cleary
- Nivea
- No Secrets

== O ==
- One Call

== P ==
- Papoose
- Paradise Lost
- Pep Love
- Petey Pablo
- P!nk (LaFace)
- Pop!
- Priscilla

== Q ==
- Q-Feel
- Q-Tip

== R ==
- R. Kelly
- R.A. the Rugged Man
- Rednex (Battery/Jive)
- Reel Big Fish
- Relient K
- RichGirl
- Rief Rawyal (Mic Vandalz)
- Robyn
- Roman Holliday
- Romeo's Daughter

== S ==
- Samantha Fox
- Samantha Jade
- Schoolly D
- Scorcher
- Shaquille O'Neal
- Six D
- Slave Raider
- Smooth
- Solid Harmonie
- Souls of Mischief
- Spice 1
- Steady B
- Steps
- Sway
- Syleena Johnson

== T ==
- T-Pain (Konvict Muzik/Nappy Boy Ent./JIVE)
- Tangerine Dream (Jive Electro)
- Tay Dizm (Nappy Boy Records/JIVE)
- The Click (Sick Wid It/Jive)
- The Comsat Angels
- The Forces of Evil
- The Men They Couldn't Hang
- The Pack (Up All Nite/Jive)
- The Parade
- The Tamperer
- The Time Frequency
- Three Days Grace
- Tight Fit
- Too $hort (Dangerous Music/Jive)
- Tool (Volcano Entertainment/Volcano Records formerly Zoo)
- Travis Porter
- Trina
- Tupac Shakur
- Tyrese

== U ==
- UGK
- Usher
- UTFO (UTFO/Jive)

== V ==
- Vitamin C

== W ==
- Wakefield
- Wee Papa Girl Rappers
- Whodini
- "Weird Al" Yankovic (Volcano Entertainment/Volcano Records)
- Wretch 32

== Y ==
- YoungBloodZ

== See also ==
- Jive Records
