= Release (Sister Hazel album) =

Studio album by Sister Hazel
- Released: August 18, 2009
- Recorded: 2008, 2009
- Genre: Southern rock
- Length: 46:13
- Label: Croakin' Poets/Rock Ridge
- Producers: Sister Hazel; Stan Lynch (co.); Ken Kelly (co.)

Sister Hazel chronology
Before the Amplifiers, Live Acoustic (2008)	Release (2009)	Heartland Highway (2010)

Professional ratings
Review scores
Source	Rating
Allmusic	3.5/5 stars
The Tune	(C)

Release is Sister Hazel's seventh studio album. It was released on August 18, 2009 through Croakin' Poets/Rock Ridge.

Unlike previous Sister Hazel albums, all of the band members contributed to the songwriting. According to Ryan Newell, the album got its name because they "Took a different approach on this record and 'released' the past method."

== Track listing ==
1. "Release" (Ryan Newell, Emerson Hart, Pat McGee) – 3:51
2. "Take a Bow" (Newell, Mike Daly, McGee) – 3:00
3. "I Believe in You" (Andrew Copeland, Stan Lynch) – 2:51
4. "Run for the Hills" (Copeland, Britton Cameron) – 3:41
5. "Better Way" (Ken Kelly, Lindsey Kelly, Mark Trojanowski) – 3:56
6. "Walls and Cannonballs" (Ken Block) – 3:14
7. "Vacation Rain" (Jett Beres) – 3:51
8. "See Me Beautiful" (Block) – 4:06
9. "One Life" (Cameron, Copeland, Lynch) – 5:13
10. "Take It Back" (L. Kelly, K. Kelly, Trojanowski) – 3:49
11. "Fade" (Newell, Chuck Carrier) – 3:29
12. "Ghost in the Crowd" (Beres) – 5:07

== Personnel ==
Sister Hazel

- Ken Block – lead vocals, acoustic guitar
- Jett Beres – bass, harmony vocals
- Andrew Copeland – rhythm guitar, vocals
- Ryan Newell – lead and slide guitar, harmony vocals
- Mark Trojanowski – drums

Technical personnel

- Sister Hazel – producers
- Stan Lynch – co-producer (3, 4, 9)
- Ken Kelly – co-producer (5, 10)
- Chip Matthews – mixing (1-6, 8-10)
- Don McCollister – mixing (7, 11, 12)
- Brad Blackwood - mastering
- Benny Quinn – additional mastering
