= William Hung =

Hong Kong–born American singer (born 1982)

- 孔慶翔
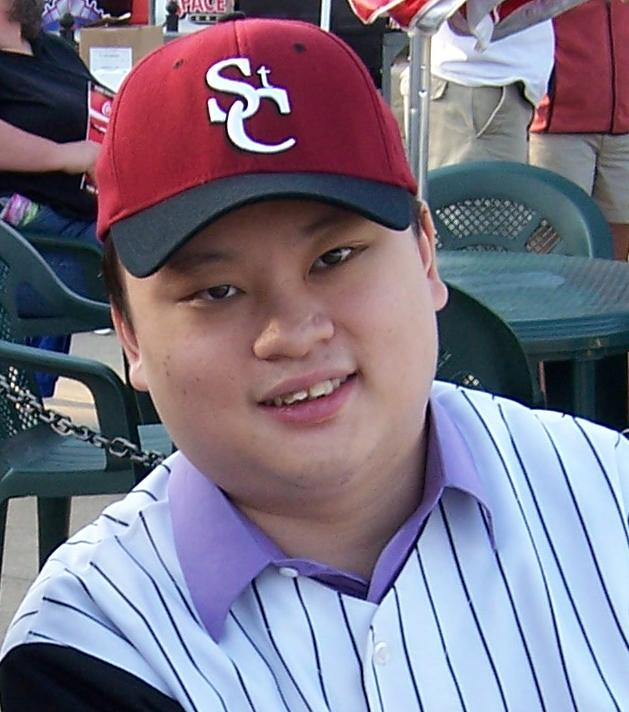
- Hung in St. Cloud, Minnesota in July 2008
- Born: November 10, 1982 (age 44); Sha Tin, British Hong Kong
- Education: California State University, Northridge (BA); Marist College (MBA)
- Occupations: Singer, actor, motivational speaker
- Spouse: Jian Teng (divorced)

Chinese name
- Traditional Chinese: 孔慶翔
- Simplified Chinese: 孔庆翔
Transcriptions
Standard Mandarin
- Hanyu Pinyin: Kǒng Qìngxiáng
Yue: Cantonese
- Jyutping: Hung2 Hing3 Cheung4
- Musical career
- Origin: Los Angeles, California, U.S.
- Genres: Pop, outsider music
- Years active: 2004–2011
- Label: Koch
- Website: www.willhung.net

William Hing Cheung Hung (Chinese: 孔慶翔; born November 10, 1982) is a Hong Kong-born American motivational speaker and former singer who gained fame in 2004 as a result of his unsuccessful audition singing Ricky Martin's hit song "She Bangs" on the third season of the television series American Idol.

At the time of his audition, Hung was a civil engineering student at UC Berkeley. After his spirited audition to be the next American Idol, he won the support of many fans, ironically, based on his perceived lack of musical talent. Hung voluntarily left university to pursue a music career. His recording career was marked by negative critical reaction. His debut album Inspiration (2004) topped the Billboard Top Independent Albums chart. However, his next two records, the Christmas EP Hung for the Holidays (2004) and his second album Miracle: Happy Summer from William Hung (2005) were significantly less commercially successful.

He brought his own career as a musician to an end when in 2011 he accepted a job opportunity as a technical crime analyst for the Los Angeles County Sheriff's Department, and decided to pursue law enforcement. Since then, Hung has reflected positively on his pop music career.

== Personal life ==
Hung is a 73rd-generation descendant of Confucius.

After growing up in the Sha Tin district of British Hong Kong, Hung moved with his family to the Van Nuys area in Los Angeles, California, at age 11. He was a civil engineering student at University of California, Berkeley, when he competed on the US television contest series American Idol. He exited college to pursue his music career and later graduated from California State University, Northridge with a degree in mathematics. Hung later completed an MBA from Marist College.

Hung was married to Jian Teng on June 18, 2014. Prior to this marriage, he had already gone through a divorce. This second marriage also ended in divorce. In 2022, Hung admitted that his gambling addiction had contributed towards his divorce and that he was taking steps to eradicate it from his life.

== Career ==
=== Initial fame ===
While studying civil engineering at the University of California, Berkeley, Hung auditioned for the third season of American Idol in San Francisco in September 2003, becoming the final auditioner on the show of January 15, 2004.

"I want to make music my living," said Hung, before he started singing and dancing to Ricky Martin's "She Bangs". As judges Randy Jackson and Paula Abdul tried to restrain their laughter, judge Simon Cowell dismissed Hung's performance, remarking "You can't sing, you can't dance, so what do you want me to say?", to which Hung replied, "Um, I already gave my best, and I have no regrets at all." Jackson and Abdul applauded his positive attitude, with Abdul remarking, "That's the best attitude yet." Hung's response to Cowell's criticism starkly contrasts with the often confrontational rejoinders of other contestants. Hung added, "...you know, I have no professional training of singing and dancing," eliciting mock surprise from Cowell, who replied, "No? Well, this is the surprise of the century." Hung was not admitted through to the next round.

=== Cult following ===
Hung rapidly gained a cult following. A William Hung fan site, set up by realtor Don Chin and his wife Laura, recorded over four million hits within its first week. Remixes of Hung's audition performance topped song request lists at a number of radio stations.

Hung subsequently appeared on several television programs including Jimmy Kimmel Live!, On Air with Ryan Seacrest, Entertainment Tonight, George Lopez, the Late Show with David Letterman, Countdown with Keith Olbermann, The Howard Stern Radio Show, The Ellen DeGeneres Show, Dateline NBC, Arrested Development and CBS's The Early Show. Hung was featured in several national magazines and newspapers; he was parodied on Saturday Night Live, Mad TV, Celebrity Deathmatch, and The Fairly OddParents. He was reportedly invited to perform at MTV's Asia Awards held in mid-February.

Hung performing at UC Berkeley's Haas Pavilion in 2004.

An online petition to bring Hung back to American Idol included more than 100,000 signatures by late February. Hung was brought back to American Idol as part of a mid-season special titled Uncut, Uncensored and Untalented, airing March 1, 2004. The special documented what it was like to experience the audition process and, in Hung's case, emerge as an inadvertent celebrity.

At the 2006 Artichoke Festival in Castroville, California, Hung was crowned the Artichoke King; Marilyn Monroe had previously received a similar honor.

=== Record deal ===
William Hung was offered a $25,000 advance on a record deal from Koch Entertainment in 2004, and released three albums on that label in 2004 and 2005. His first album was Inspiration. Produced by Giuseppe D, it was recorded over a March 2004 weekend with Hung singing vocals over karaoke music. To promote it, Hung performed before nearly 20,000 fans during half-time at a Golden State Warriors basketball game on April 6 and performed "She Bangs", included on the album, on such shows as The Tonight Show with Jay Leno. The album received highly negative reviews, but ultimately went on to sell about 200,000 copies and reached Number One on Billboard's Top Independent Album Chart. His two follow-up albums were far less successful, as Hung for the Holidays (a Christmas album) only sold 35,000 copies, despite a national promotion campaign including appearances on The Howard Stern Show, and Miracle: Happy Summer from William Hung (another karaoke cover album) only sold 7,000. In a February 2006 interview, he said he was working on a fourth album of 5 or 6 tracks, but none was released, and he retired in 2011.

=== Television, commercials and movies ===
Hung appeared in commercials for the search engine Ask.com, the Game Show Network (spoofing Freddie Mercury and singing an off-key "We Are the Champions"), as well as the mobile phone service provider Cingular Wireless. He also appeared to sing "Take Me Out to the Ballgame" in May 2004 at the Rogers Centre for the Toronto Blue Jays.

His first movie, a low-budget Hong Kong period comedy called Where is Mama's Boy (2004), was released in January 2005. Hung played a good-natured village kid who sells Chinese pancakes to pay his mother's medical bills. His character gets discovered as a singer, and helps a woman protect her business from her jealous, conniving elder sister. In the film, Hung played opposite veteran Hong Kong actress Nancy Sit and parodied his own American Idol performance with the song "Siu Beng" (Cantonese) ("Chinese Pancake"), an allusion to his American Idol audition song, "She Bangs". Despite solid financial backing and the involvement of Nancy Sit, the film was a box office flop.

Lampooning his own career, Hung later made appearances in Airline, Arrested Development, and George Lopez.

=== Retirement from music ===
After a semester-long attempt at teaching high-school math, in 2011, Hung became a technical crime analyst for the Los Angeles County Sheriff's Department, and retired from music. Hung remains optimistic about his new career path, and states he does not regret that his music career has ended. "I showed that even the Average Joe could succeed," he remarked on his short-lived time as a pop star.

Hung later joined the Los Angeles County Department of Public Health around 2014. In 2017, Hung became a motivational speaker; he has been booked as a keynote speaker for groups such as the Asian Realtors Association of America.

On April 7, 2016, he made a surprise performance of "She Bangs" on the American Idol season 15 finale.

On May 2, 2022, Hung made another surprise appearance on American Idol season 20.

== Analysis of popularity ==
Commentator Emil Guillermo claimed that Hung may not have gained as much attention had he been of another race, and his popularity may be derived from his being a representation of the Asian stereotype, characterized by nerdiness, bucked teeth, studiousness, speaking with a strong "fresh off the boat" accent, and lacking singing talent or rhythm. Documentary filmmaker James Hou commented, "As Asian Americans, we look through this racial lens, and we see this guy who embodies all the stereotypes we're trying to escape from."

Some analysts have argued that Hung's career arose out of mockery, and that the media exploited him as a joke rather than as a talented or inspirational figure. Ron Lin, former editor in chief of the UC Berkeley's Daily Californian asserts: "It's really difficult for Asian American males to break through and (Hung) may not be the most appealing example."

Amber Eliza Watts suggested that Hung's cult following derived from him being the antithesis of everything Idol represented, with his lack of musical talent and odd looks, and how unlike other audition failures he was not arrogantly expecting to be made a pop star, he just wanted to sing. In a 2008 American Idol extra, in response to the question, "Why do you think it is that people gravitate towards William Hung so much?", Hung stated, "I believe it's my attitude and charisma, I tell people constantly, media, everywhere I go, just never give up on your dream."

== Discography ==
=== Albums ===
==== Studio albums ====
List of studio albums with chart positions and sales
Title	Album details	Peak chart positions				Sales
Title	Album details	US	US Indie	AUS	AUS Heat.	Sales
Inspiration	Released: April 6, 2004; Label: Koch; Format: CD, digital download	34	1	89	4	US: 200,000
Miracle: Happy Summer from William Hung	Released: July 12, 2005; Label: Koch; Format: CD, digital download	—	—	—	—	US: 7,000
"—" denotes the album did not chart.

==== Extended plays ====
List of extended plays with chart positions and sales
Title	EP details	Peak chart positions	Sales
Title	EP details	US Indie	Sales
Hung for the Holidays	Released: October 19, 2004; Label: Koch; Format: CD, digital download	22	US: 35,000

=== Singles ===
List of singles, showing year released and album name
Title	Year	Album
"We Are the Champions"	2004	Hung for the Holidays
"Achy Breaky Heart"	2005	Miracle: Happy Summer from William Hung

=== Music videos ===
Title	Year
"She Bangs"	2004
"We Are the Champions"	2004
"Achy Breaky Heart"	2005

Hung's music video, "She Bangs", was viewed over 2 million times on YouTube before it was made private.

== See also ==
- Fernando Villares, a Mexican singer with a similar music career
