= Chasing Daylight =

Studio album by Sister Hazel
- Released: February 4, 2003
- Recorded: July 2001–September 2002
- Genre: Southern rock
- Length: 52:46
- Label: Croakin' Poets/Sixthman
- Producers: Don McCollister; Sister Hazel

Sister Hazel chronology
Fortress (2000)	Chasing Daylight (2003)	Lift (2004)

Professional ratings
Review scores
Source	Rating
Allmusic	2/5 stars

Chasing Daylight, released in 2003, is Sister Hazel's fourth studio album.

== Track listing ==
No.	Title	Lyrics	Music	Length
1.	"Your Mistake"	Ken Block	Block	4:09
2.	"Come Around"	Block; Jett Beres	Beres	3:56
3.	"One Love"	Block; Billy Montana; Henry Paul; Dave Robbins	Ryan Newell; Montana; Paul; Robbins	3:29
4.	"Best I'll Ever Be"	Block	Andrew Copeland	4:50
5.	"Life Got in the Way"	Block; Richard Marx	Block; Marx	3:38
6.	"Everybody"	Block; Beres; Newell	Block; Beres; Newell	3:31
7.	"Swan Dive"	Block; Newell; Beres; Tia Sillers	Newell	3:46
8.	"Killing Me Too"	Block	Block	5:37
9.	"Sword and Shield"	Block	Block	5:06
10.	"Hopeless"	Copeland; Stan Lynch	Copeland; Lynch	6:10
11.	"Effortlessly"	Block; Beres; Newell	Block; Beres; Newell	4:06
12.	"Can't Believe"	Copleland	Copeland	4:33

== Acoustic versions ==
The band also released an EP of acoustic versions of three of the songs: "Everybody," "Your Mistake," and "Best I'll Ever Be."

== Personnel ==
Sister Hazel

- Ken Block – lead vocals, acoustic guitar, background vocals
- Andrew Copeland - background vocals, lead vocals (10), rhythm electric guitar
- Ryan Newell - lead electric guitar, rhythm electric guitar, slide electric guitar, acoustic guitar
- Jett Beres - bass guitar
- Mark Trojanowski - drums

Additional musicians

- Tom Hurst – percussion (6, 7, 12)
- Marty Kearns – Hammond B3 organ (2, 10)

Strings

- Bill Smith – composer, conductor
- Susie Ager, Tomasz Golka, Delmar Pettys, Kurt Sprenger, Daphne Volle – violins
- Tom Demer, Susan Dubois – violas
- Debbie Brooks, Lisa Engle – celli

Technical personnel

- Don McCollister – producer, mixing, engineer
- Kris Sampson – assistant engineer
- Jeremy Zamora – assistant engineer
- Erik Herbst – strings engineer
- Greg Calbi – mastering

== Charts ==
Chart (2003)	Peak position
The Billboard 200	177
Top Independent Albums	6
Top Internet Albums	177

Singles

Year	Single	Chart	Position
2003	"Your Mistake"	Adult Top 40	27
2003	"Life Got In The Way"	Adult Top 40	36
