= More Songs from Pooh Corner =

Studio album by Kenny Loggins
- Released: February 8, 2000
- Studios: Conway Studios (Hollywood, California); Record One, Record Plant and Mancina Music, Inc.(Los Angeles, California); Area 51 (Santa Barbara, California); Jai Winding Productions (Santa Monica, California); Audio Resources and KM Studios (Honolulu, Oahu, Hawaii)
- Genres: Children's music, pop, rock
- Length: 47:53
- Label: Sony
- Producers: Peter Asher; Kenny Loggins; Mark Mancina; David Pack; Barry Flanagan; Kenneth Makuakane

Kenny Loggins chronology
December (1998)	More Songs from Pooh Corner (2000)	It's About Time (2003)

Professional ratings
Review scores
Source	Rating
Allmusic	4/5 stars

More Songs from Pooh Corner is the eleventh studio and second children's album by American singer-songwriter Kenny Loggins, released on February 8, 2000. The album features numerous covers of songs from children's films, including from The Tigger Movie, a film in the Winnie the Pooh series from which the album derives its name. The album acts as a sequel to Loggins' prior work, Return to Pooh Corner. Loggins noted that the third track on the album was written in response to his eldest child moving away from home, and that it had been cut from the prior Pooh record.

== Track listing ==
1. "Your Heart Will Lead You Home" (from The Tigger Movie) (Kenny Loggins, Richard M. Sherman, Robert B. Sherman) – 5:13
2. "You'll Be in My Heart" (from Tarzan) (Phil Collins) – 5:19
3. "Always, In All Ways" (Mark Mancina, Loggins) – 4:07
4. "Flying Dreams" (Duet with Olivia Newton-John) (from The Secret of NIMH) (Paul Williams, Jerry Goldsmith) – 4:06
5. "That'll Do" (from Babe: Pig in the City) (Randy Newman) – 3:54
6. "Turn Around" (Malvina Reynolds, Harry Belafonte, Alan Greene) – 3:48
7. "Beauty and the Beast" (from Beauty and the Beast) (Alan Menken, Howard Ashman) – 3:42
8. "Baby Mine" (from Dumbo) (Churchill, Washington) – 4:27
9. The Inch Worm" (Duet with Isabella Loggins) (from Hans Christian Andersen) (Frank Loesser) – 3:28
10. "Hana Aluna Lullabye" (Barry Flanagan; English lyrics by Kenny and Julia Loggins) – 6:13
11. "Goodnight" (Duet with Alison Krauss) (John Lennon, Paul McCartney) – 3:35

== Personnel ==
- Kenny Loggins – vocals, guitars (1)
- Jai Winding – keyboards (1, 4, 5, 9), string arrangements and conductor (9, 11)
- Marc Mann – programming and MIDI design, programming (4), string arrangements and conductor (4, 5, 8, 9, 11)
- Mark Binder – additional programming
- Jason Ruder – MIDI programming (2, 3)
- Don Wyatt – synthesizers (5, 6)
- Frank Marocco – accordion (5)
- Dean Parks – guitars (1–3, 6–9, 11)
- Mark Mancina – acoustic guitar (2, 3), 12-string acoustic guitar (2), nylon guitar (2), bass guitar (2, 3), Hammond organ (3)
- Barry Flanagan – lead guitar (10), ukulele solo (10), chorus vocals (10)
- Keli'i Kaneali'i – 12-string rhythm guitar (10), backing vocals (10), chorus vocals (10)
- Larry Klein – bass (1)
- Nathan East – bass (2, 3, 7, 11)
- Larry Tuttle – upright bass (9)
- Jack Ofola – bass (10)
- Peter Asher – drum programming (1), percussion (1)
- Louis Molino – drums (2)
- Rock Deadrick – percussion (6, 8, 11)
- Norton Buffalo – harmonica (11)
- Jon Clarke – English horn (4, 9), recorder (4, 5), contrabass clarinet (5), oboe solo (9)
- Eric Rigler – Uilleann pipes (5)
- Steve Erdody – cello solo (3)
- Stefanie Fife – cello (4, 8, 9, 11)
- Suzie Katayama – cello (7)
- Novi Novog – viola (4, 8, 9, 11)
- Joel Derouin – violin (4, 8, 9, 11)
- Karen Briggs – violin solo (9)
- Gayle Levant – harp (5)
- David Newman – string arrangements and conductor (1)
- Don Harper – string arrangements and conductor (2)
- Olivia Newton-John – vocals (4)
- Alison Krauss – vocals (11)

Interludes

- Steve Wood – performer, arrangements
- Richard Hardy – woodwinds
- Sue Bredice, Kate McGarry, Carolyn Miller and Beth Wood – vocals

Adult choir on "Your Heart Will Lead You Home"

- Rosemary Butler, Gary Falcone, Wendy Fraser, Dorian Holley, Raven Kane, Stephen Lively, Arnold McCuller, Bobbi Page, Andrea Robinson, Stephanie Spruill, Carmen Twillie and Terry Wood

Children's choir on "Your Heart Will Lead You Home"

- Tiffany Takara Greer, Jonnie Hall, Molly Hall, Cord Jackman, Brian Lassiter, Richard Luccese, Brandon Pollard, Laurie Schillinger, Sophie Schwartz and Ayana Williams

== Production ==
- Peter Asher – executive producer, producer (1)
- Kenny Loggins – producer
- Mark Mancina – producer (2, 3)
- David Pack – producer (7)
- Barry Flanagan – producer (10)
- Kenneth Makuakane – producer (10), additional engineer
- Nathaniel Kunkel – recording
- Charles Choi – additional engineer
- Mark Cross – additional engineer
- Tony Sheppard – additional engineer
- Steve Tose – additional engineer
- Howard Blakey – assistant engineer
- Greg Burns – assistant engineer
- Tony Flores – assistant engineer
- John Nelson – assistant engineer
- Jenny Rosato – assistant engineer
- Howard Wolen – assistant engineer
- George Massenburg – mixing at Petewood/Georkel Studio (Nashville, Tennessee)
- Doug Sax – mastering at The Mastering Lab (Hollywood, California)
- Hillary Bratton – A&R manager
- Ivy Skoff – production coordinator
- Thomas Christian Wolfe – cover concept, illustration
- Morgan Kirby – cover art technical support
- Alan Shaffer – photography
- Jeanine Chan – personal assistant for Kenny Loggins
- Ginny Pallante – personal assistant for Peter Asher
- Higher Vision, Inc. – management
- The Sterling Winters Company – management
