= Lift (Sister Hazel album) =

Studio album by Sister Hazel
- Released: August 24, 2004
- Recorded: 2003–04
- Studios: 747 Studios (Memphis, Tennessee)
- Genre: Southern rock
- Length: 50:12
- Label: Croakin' Poets/Sixthman
- Producers: Skidd Mills; Sister Hazel

Sister Hazel chronology
Chasing Daylight (2003)	Lift (2004)	Absolutely (2006)

Professional ratings
Review scores
Source	Rating
Allmusic	2.5/5 stars

Lift, released in 2004, is Sister Hazel's fifth studio album.

== Track listing ==
No.	Title	Lyrics	Music	Length
1.	"Surrender"	Ken Block; Richard Marx	Block; Marx	3:44
2.	"Lay It Down"	Block; Ed Roland	Block; Roland	4:34
3.	"World Inside My Head"	Block; Marx	Block; Marx; Skidd Mills	4:38
4.	"Hold On"	Block; Ryan Newell; Jett Beres	Newell	3:59
5.	"I Will Come Through"	Block	Sister Hazel	4:22
6.	"All About the Love"	Block; Newell; Beres	Newell	2:59
7.	"In the Moment"	Andrew Copeland; Stan Lynch	Copeland; Lynch	3:32
8.	"Dreamers"	Block	Block	3:27
9.	"Another Me"	Block; Newell; Beres	Newell	4:02
10.	"Firefly"	Block	Block	4:06
11.	"Just What I Needed" (The Cars cover)	Ric Ocasek	Ocasek	4:02
12.	"Erin"	Newell	Newell	1:57
13.	"Green (Welcome to the World)"	Block; Beres	Block	4:54

Notes

- The song "Green (Welcome to the World)" ends at 4:03. An untitled hidden track starts at 4:23.

== Acoustic versions ==
The band also released an EP of acoustic versions of five of the songs: "World Inside My Head," "Hold On," "Firefly," "Another Me," and "All About the Love."

== Personnel ==
Sister Hazel

- Ken Block - lead vocals, acoustic guitar
- Andrew Copeland - background vocals, rhythm electric guitar
- Ryan Newell - lead electric guitar, rhythm electric guitar, slide electric guitar
- Jett Beres - bass guitar
- Mark Trojanowski - drums

Additional personnel

- Skidd Mills – Fender Rhodes (4, 13), Hammond B3 organ (2, 3, 9, 10, 13), synthesizer (11), strings arrangements (2)
- Richard Thomas Jr. – cello (2)
- Jonathan Chu – violin and viola (2)
- Scott Hardin – piano (3, 9)

Production

- Skidd Mills – producer, mixing, audio engineer
- Brad Blackwood – mastering
- Scott Hardin – assistant engineer
