= Inspiration (William Hung album) =

Studio album by William Hung
- Released: April 6, 2004
- Recorded: March 6–7, 2004
- Studios: The Facility III, Fantasy Studios and Ashe Music Studios
- Length: 45:01
- Label: Koch
- Producers: Chris Young, Giuseppe D.

William Hung chronology
Inspiration (2004)	Hung for the Holidays (2004)

Inspiration, originally planned to be True Idol, is the debut full-length studio album by William Hung, a former hopeful American Idol contestant. The album was recorded at Fantasy Studios and released by Koch Entertainment, now Entertainment One in 2004, after his audition. Although the album was commercially successful, it received a highly negative critical reception due to Hung's poor vocals and the sound of the karaoke tracks used on the album.

== Development ==
The album was recorded following the early 2004 broadcast of his failed Idol audition where Hung, a 20-year-old civil engineering student, received notoriety and a cult following due to an enthusiastic yet mediocre performance of "She Bangs". When rejected for advancement, he kept a positive attitude and proclaimed he'd done his best and had "no regrets".

The album released on April 6, 2004, by Koch Entertainment, now Entertainment One. The album was recorded the weekend of March 6, 2004, with Hung singing vocals over digital MIDI music, with real musicians occasionally playing as well. The album was put together in 5 weeks. The album includes a 40-minute DVD documentary entitled A Day in the Life of a Small William Hung.

== Release and commercial performance ==
Two weeks before the release of Inspiration, iTunes did a "Pre-Release Teaser" where they sold four tracks from the album. The tracks received a total of 25,000 downloads. To promote the album, Hung performed before nearly 20,000 fans during half-time at a Golden State Warriors game on April 6. Later that week, he performed his signature song, "She Bangs", on The Tonight Show with Jay Leno and appeared on The Today Show.

The album peaked on the Billboard 200 albums chart at No. 34, selling 37,676 units during its first week and peaked at No. 1 on the Billboard Independent Album chart. The album was the fifth best seller at Trans World stores, and at Tower Records was No. 14, behind Modest Mouse. The album has sold a total of 200,000 copies.

== Critical reception ==
Professional ratings
Review scores
Source	Rating
Allmusic	1/5 stars
IGN	0.5/10 stars
Entertainment Weekly	F
Stylus Magazine	D−
Shakingthrough.net	0/5 stars
People	1/4 stars
The Florida Times-Union	Negative
Milwaukee Journal Sentinel	Negative
Pittsburgh Post-Gazette	Negative
Rhapsody	Negative
The Pittsburgh Tribune-Review	Negative
The Morning Call	Negative
Houston Press	Negative
San Francisco Weekly	Negative

Allmusic's Stephen Thomas Erlewine gave Inspiration one star out of five, but adding it was still worth a chuckle or two for those wanting a laugh, "since it has some of the worst singing ever captured on record". He also said that the album should have been a four-track single or extended play, because "there are really only four tracks of note and that's about all that anybody could take of this anyway." The album was scored by IGN's Chris Cale a 0.5 out of ten, remarking that Hung smattered other musicians' hits, took the time to "carefully destroy each and every one" and that Hung's "music is a cacophony of wrong-notes, stoic delivery and shoddy rhythm", warning readers not to buy the album. David Browne of Entertainment Weekly, who graded the album an F, said that it "adds a particularly ugly race card" to the tradition of "William Shatner to schizophrenic indie-rock icon Wesley Willis."

== Track listing ==
1. "Words of Gratitude" (original monologue by Hung)
2. "She Bangs" (originally by Ricky Martin)
3. "Bailamos" (originally by Enrique Iglesias)
4. "Inspirational Thoughts: Passion" (original monologue by Hung)
5. "I Believe I Can Fly" (originally by R. Kelly)
6. "Hotel California" (originally by Eagles)
7. "Can You Feel the Love Tonight" (originally by Elton John)
8. "Two Worlds" (originally by Phil Collins)
9. "Inspirational Thoughts: Perseverance" (original monologue by Hung)
10. "Rocket Man" (originally by Elton John)
11. "Free" (original song)
12. "Circle of Life" (originally by Elton John)
13. "Inspirational Thoughts: Be Yourself"
14. "Y.M.C.A." (featuring The Gonnabees) (originally by The Village People)
15. "Shake Your Bon-Bon" (originally by Ricky Martin)

== Personnel ==
- William Hung – lead vocals (all tracks), songwriting (tracks 1, 4, 9, 11)
- Joshua Gilfand – guitars, bass
- Oba Frank Lords – percussion, backing vocals
- Saul Alvarez – drums, songwriting (track 11)
- Giuseppe D. – synthesizers, production
- Pepe, Mauro DeSantis, Christopher Young – additional production
- The Gonnabees, Jesika Pate, N'Gai – backing vocals

== Charts ==
Chart (2004)	Peak position
Australian Albums Chart	89
US Billboard 200	34
US Independent Albums (Billboard)	1
