= Sister Hazel =

American rock band

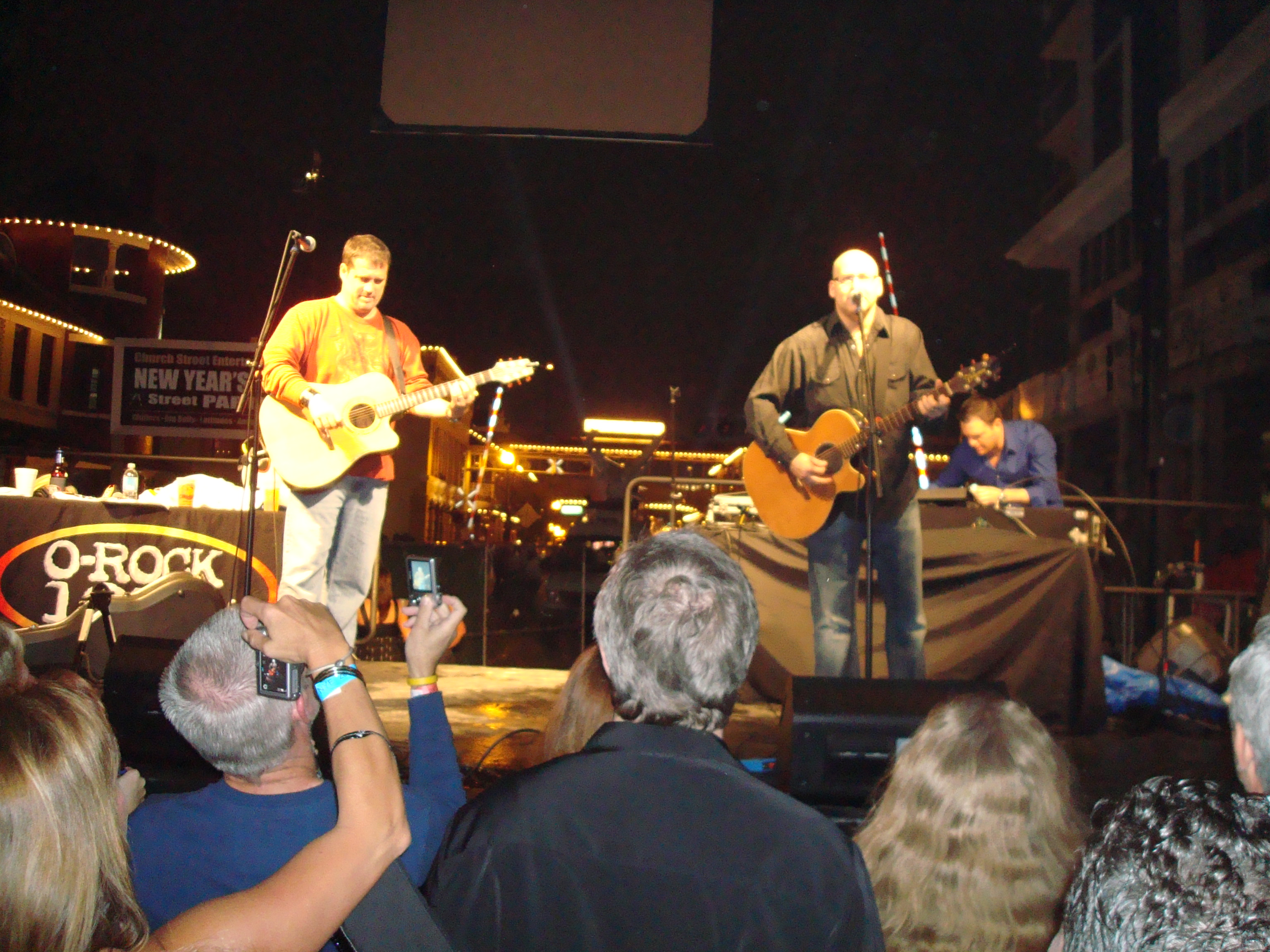
- Sister Hazel performing in Orlando, Florida, in 2007

Background information
- Origin: Gainesville, Florida, U.S.
- Genres: Alternative rock; Southern rock; folk rock; jangle pop
- Years active: 1993–present
- Labels: Croakin' Poets; Universal; Sixthman; Rock Ridge
- Members: Ken Block; Jett Beres; Andrew Copeland; Ryan Newell; Mark Trojanowski
- Website: sisterhazel.com

Sister Hazel is an American rock band from Gainesville, Florida, whose style blends elements of jangle pop, folk rock, classic rock, and Southern rock. They are best known for their 1997 hit single "All for You", which hit No. 11 on the Billboard Hot 100.

== History ==
Sister Hazel formed in Gainesville, Florida, in 1993 and was named for Sister Hazel Williams, a local missionary who ran a homeless shelter. The group released its self-titled debut album in 1994, through its independent record label Croakin' Poets. Shortly after its release, singer/guitarist Ryan Newell and drummer Mark Trojanowski joined the band. Newell played on the album before officially joining the group.

The band's second album ...Somewhere More Familiar was released in 1997 and sold approximately 30,000 copies through its initial pressing, prompting Universal Records to sign the band. Universal re-released ...Somewhere More Familiar in late 1997. A single from the album, "All for You", hit No. 11 on the Billboard Hot 100 and remains the band's most successful single.

The band's third album Fortress was released in 2000 by Universal. The band worked with producers Mike Clink (Guns N' Roses, Mötley Crüe, Heart), Richie Zito (Cheap Trick), and Paul Ebersold (3 Doors Down). The album featured minor pop hits "Champagne High" and "Change Your Mind.”

In 2003, after the band split from Universal, they released their fourth studio album, Chasing Daylight, on the Sixthman label and toured throughout the year to promote the album. The band's internet presence emerged during this time period, and hardcore fans dubbing themselves "Hazelnuts" studied setlists, shared bootleg concert recordings, and initiated a promotion scheme with the band through their official website. 2003 also saw the simultaneous release of Live*LIVE, a two-disc live album, and A Life in the Day, a live DVD.

In 2004, Sister Hazel released their next studio album, Lift. Songs from Lift were re-recorded for 2005's Lift: Acoustic Renditions, an EP of studio acoustic takes on five of the songs, offered exclusively through Apple's iTunes Store. In July 2005, the Sister Hazel album was re-issued again by Sixthman, in response to claims that the album had become difficult to find in stores.

Sister Hazel then promoted their album, Absolutely, which was released on October 10, 2006. The band also continued to tour and hold annual fan gathering events, The Rock Boat and The Rock Slope. Absolutely is the band's highest-charting album on the Billboard charts following Fortress and it received 4 out of a possible 5 stars from Allmusic, a tie with Fortress's score.

On June 5, 2007, Sister Hazel released a "hybrid" album, BAM! Volume 1. It contains B-sides from the Absolutely recording sessions and some from previous albums. Sister Hazel also released a holiday album called Santa's Playlist on September 25, 2007.

On February 9, 2008, the band performed a live concert at Daytona International Speedway for the Budweiser Shootout. They released a live acoustic album on June 17, 2008, Before the Amplifiers, Live Acoustic on Croakin' Poets/Rock Ridge Music. The record features 16 tracks, including the band's hits, fan favorites, and live concert staples, all in a stripped-down, acoustic format. The album was recorded on January 12 at Nickel & Dime Studios in Atlanta (other bands who have recorded there in the past include Indigo Girls, The B-52's, Shawn Mullins) in front of a hundred fans who were chosen at random from more than five thousand entries.

At the July 18, 2008, concert at Wolf Trap Farm Park, drummer Mark Trojanowski took paternity leave for his newborn child. Former Vertical Horizon and current Doobie Brothers drummer Ed Toth played in his absence.

On July 9, 2009, Ford Motor Company announced a collaboration with Sister Hazel to promote the company's new Sync technology, available on many Ford, Lincoln, and Mercury vehicles. The band was featured on a Ford website, syncmyride.com.

The band released their seventh studio album of original songs (tenth album overall) on August 18, 2009. The album, entitled Release, contains 12 tracks and is on the Rock Ridge Music label. On the day of release, Release was the number one album on iTunes.

Less than six months after releasing Release, the band returned to the studio to work on their new album, Heartland Highway, was released on October 12, 2010. Its first radio single was "Stay a While".

The band's ninth studio album, Lighter in the Dark, was announced in the later part of 2015. It is their first country album, and was released on February 19, 2016. The lead single from the album is "We Got It All Tonight". Two songs, "We Got It All Tonight" and "Karaoke Song", which features country artist Darius Rucker, were made available for instant download for those who pre-ordered the album.

The band's namesake Dr. Hazel Kirkland Williams died on July 16, 2016, at age 91 in Gainesville.

The band released an EP Water on February 9, 2018, which featured the lead single "Roll On Bye". Less than a week after the release of Water, the band announced they had begun recording a follow-up EP in Nashville, Tennessee. The EP Wind was released on September 7, 2018. The next EP in the "Elements" series, Fire, was released on February 8, 2019. The final installment in the "Elements" series, Earth, was released on September 6, 2019. Each of the EPs in the series included a portion of a song at the end, intended to be linked together in a future release. On November 26, 2019, all the EPs were combined into a single release, Elements. The 25-song, double-disc set includes the final "Elements" song pieced together.

== Use in media ==
The band has had music featured in several movies and soundtracks including Major League: Back to the Minors, The Wedding Planner, Clay Pigeons, Bedazzled and 10 Things I Hate About You. Sister Hazel also appear on the Fleetwood Mac tribute album, Legacy: A Tribute to Fleetwood Mac's Rumours with their cover version of "Gold Dust Woman". In 1999, they recorded a cover of "September Gurls" for the Big Star tribute album, Big Star, Small World. However, the track was not included when the album was released in 2006. The song "Where Do You Go" was featured on Scrubs (Season 6, Episode 4, "My House"). "All For You" was featured in episode 7 of the first season of The Way Home (TV series)

== Musical style ==
=== Influences ===
While some of the band members feel like their sounds are simply Sister Hazel, Ryan Newell has cited Jimi Hendrix, Stevie Ray Vaughan, Jimmy Page, Van Halen, and Eric Clapton as his influences. The band has certainly been influenced by other southern rock and folk music.

== Philanthropy ==
Lyrics for Life is a non-profit organization for the benefit of pediatric cancer. Sister Hazel had a benefit concert to support the Sarah Jones Scholarship Fund.

== Band members ==
- Ken Block – lead vocals, acoustic guitar
- Jett Beres – bass, backing vocals
- Andrew Copeland – rhythm guitar, backing vocals, keyboards
- Ryan Newell – lead guitar, backing vocals
- Mark Trojanowski – drums

Former touring musicians

- Dave LaGrande – keyboards, saxophone (2012–2023)

== Discography ==
=== Studio albums ===
Year	Album details	Chart positions				Certification
Year	Album details	US	US Country	US Indie	US Rock	Certification
1994	Sister Hazel: Released: April 11, 1994; Label: Croakin' Poets	—	—	—	—	
1997	...Somewhere More Familiar: Released: February 25, 1997; Label: Universal	47	—	—	—	RIAA: Platinum
2000	Fortress: Released: June 27, 2000; Label: Universal	63	—	—	—	
2003	Chasing Daylight: Released: February 4, 2003; Label: Croakin' Poets/Sixthman	177	—	6	—	
2004	Lift: Released: August 24, 2004; Label: Croakin' Poets/Sixthman	184	—	20	—	
2006	Absolutely: Released: October 10, 2006; Label: Adrenaline/Wandering Hazel	86	—	4	—	
2009	Release: Released: August 18, 2009; Label: Croakin' Poets/Rock Ridge	37	—	3	8	
2010	Heartland Highway: Released: October 12, 2010; Label: Croakin' Poets/Rock Ridge	80	—	19	33	
2016	Lighter in the Dark: Released: February 19, 2016; Label: Croakin' Poets	79	4	6	12	
2020	Elements: Released: April 3, 2020; Label: Croakin' Poets	—	—	—	—	
2024	Sand, Sea & Crash Debris: Released: November 15, 2024; Label: Rock Ridge	—	—	—	—	
"—" denotes releases that did not chart.

=== EPs ===
Year	EP details	Chart positions				Sales
Year	EP details	US	US Country	US Indie	US Rock	Sales
2018	Water: Released: February 9, 2018; Label: Croakin' Poets	96	9	2	14	
2018	Wind: Released: September 7, 2018; Label: Croakin' Poets	—	46	11	—	US: 3,600
2019	Fire: Released: February 8, 2019; Label: Croakin' Poets	—	48	5	—	US: 3,300
2019	Earth: Released: September 6, 2019; Label: Croakin' Poets	—	—	—	—	
"—" denotes releases that did not chart

=== Other releases ===
- 99.3 The Zone – Collector's Edition 1997 – 1997
- "Let Your Love Flow" – Clay Pigeons Soundtrack – 1998
- Live*LIVE – Live Double Album – March 2003
- A Life in the Day – Live DVD – March 2003
- Chasing Daylight – Acoustic EP – August 2004 (downloadable exclusive)
- Lift: Acoustic Renditions – April 2005 (downloadable exclusive)
- BAM! Volume 1 – June 5, 2007 (B-Sides Album)
- Santa's Playlist – September 25, 2007 (Holiday Album)
- Before the Amplifiers, Live Acoustic – Live Album – June 17, 2008
- 20 In '10 Collection – Compilation Album – February 8, 2010 (Amazon.com downloadable exclusive)
- Threeve – EP – June 1, 2010 (iTunes downloadable exclusive)
- 11411 – Compilation/Sampler – January 3, 2011 (Amazon.com downloadable exclusive)
- This Is Gator Country – 2011 (featured on a special compilation CD titled "You're in Gator Country," sold exclusively by the University of Florida Athletic Association)
- 20 Stages – Live Double Album [CD or Limited Edition Vinyl LP] – October 7, 2014
- 20 Stages – Live DVD – October 7, 2014
- Live From Daryl's House Club – Live CD – December 9, 2016
- Live From Daryl's House Club – Live DVD – December 9, 2016
- Before the Amplifiers 2 – Live Album – December 10, 2021

=== Singles ===
Title	Year	Chart positions						Album
Title	Year	US	US Alt	US Main	US Adult 40	US AC	AUS	Album
"All for You"	1997	11	39	—	1	16	50	...Somewhere More Familiar
"Concede"	1997	—	—	—	—	—	—	...Somewhere More Familiar
"Happy"	1998	73	37	31	27	—	—	...Somewhere More Familiar
"Change Your Mind"	2000	59	—	—	5	—	—	Fortress
"Champagne High"	2001	—	—	—	22	—	—	Fortress
"Beautiful Thing"	2001	—	—	—	—	—	—	Fortress
"Your Mistake"	2002	—	—	—	27	—	—	Chasing Daylight
"Life Got in the Way"	2003	—	—	—	36	—	—	Chasing Daylight
"Just What I Needed"	2004	—	—	—	—	—	—	Lift
"World Inside My Head"	2004	—	—	—	—	—	—	Lift
"Mandolin Moon" (featuring Shawn Mullins)	2006	—	—	—	26	—	—	Absolutely
"This Kind of Love"	2008	—	—	—	—	—	—	Absolutely
"Take a Bow"	2009	—	—	—	—	—	—	Release
"Vacation Rain"	2010	—	—	—	—	—	—	Release
"Stay Awhile"	2010	—	—	—	—	—	—	Heartland Highway
"We Got It All Tonight"	2015	—	—	—	—	—	—	Lighter in the Dark
"Roll on Bye"	2018	—	—	—	—	—	—	Water
"Small Town Living"	2018	—	—	—	—	—	—	Wind
"Here with You"	2019	—	—	—	—	—	—	Fire
"Good for You"	2019	—	—	—	—	—	—	Earth
"Coconut Trees"	2023	—	—	—	—	—	—	Sand, Sea & Crash Debris
