= Lovecraft (disambiguation) =

H. P. Lovecraft (1890–1937) was an American writer.

Lovecraft or H. P. Lovecraft may also refer to:

== Books ==
- Lovecraft: A Look Behind the Cthulhu Mythos, 1972 book by Lin Carter
- Lovecraft: A Biography, 1975 biography by L. Sprague de Camp

== Film and television ==
- Lovecraft: Fear of the Unknown, 2008 documentary
- Lovecraft (Gotham), 2014 episode

== Music ==
- H. P. Lovecraft (band), 1967 American rock band formed in Chicago, Illinois
  - H. P. Lovecraft (album), 1967
  - H. P. Lovecraft II, 1968

== Other uses ==
- Lovecraft (crater), a crater on Mercury

== See also ==
- Lovecraft Country (disambiguation)
