= May 1968 =

Month of 1968

<<	May 1968					>>
Su	Mo	Tu	We	Th	Fr	Sa
			1	2	3	4
5	6	7	8	9	10	11
12	13	14	15	16	17	18
19	20	21	22	23	24	25
26	27	28	29	30	31

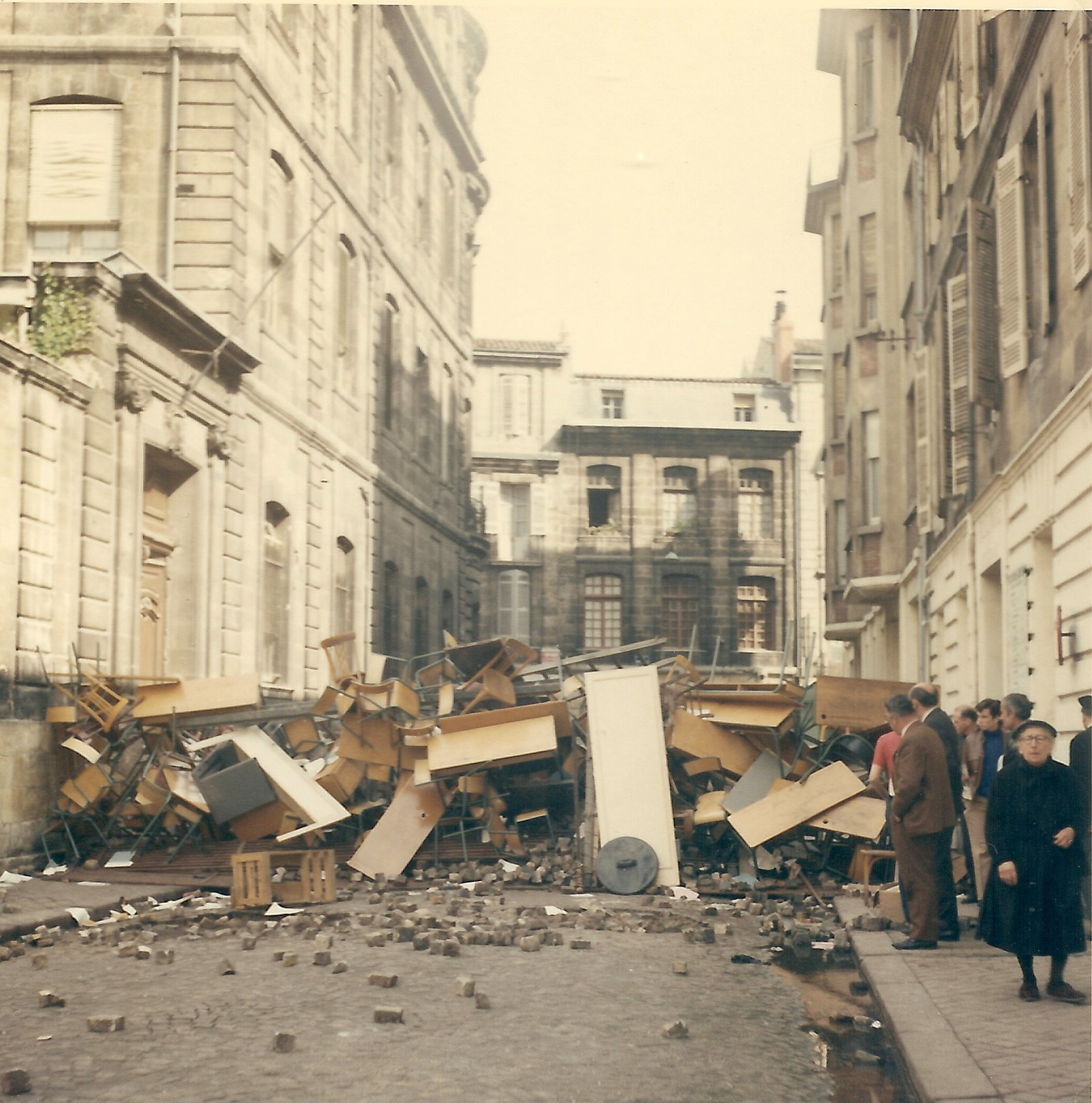
May 10, 1968: France protests grow and demonstrators barricade the streets (as seen in Bordeaux)

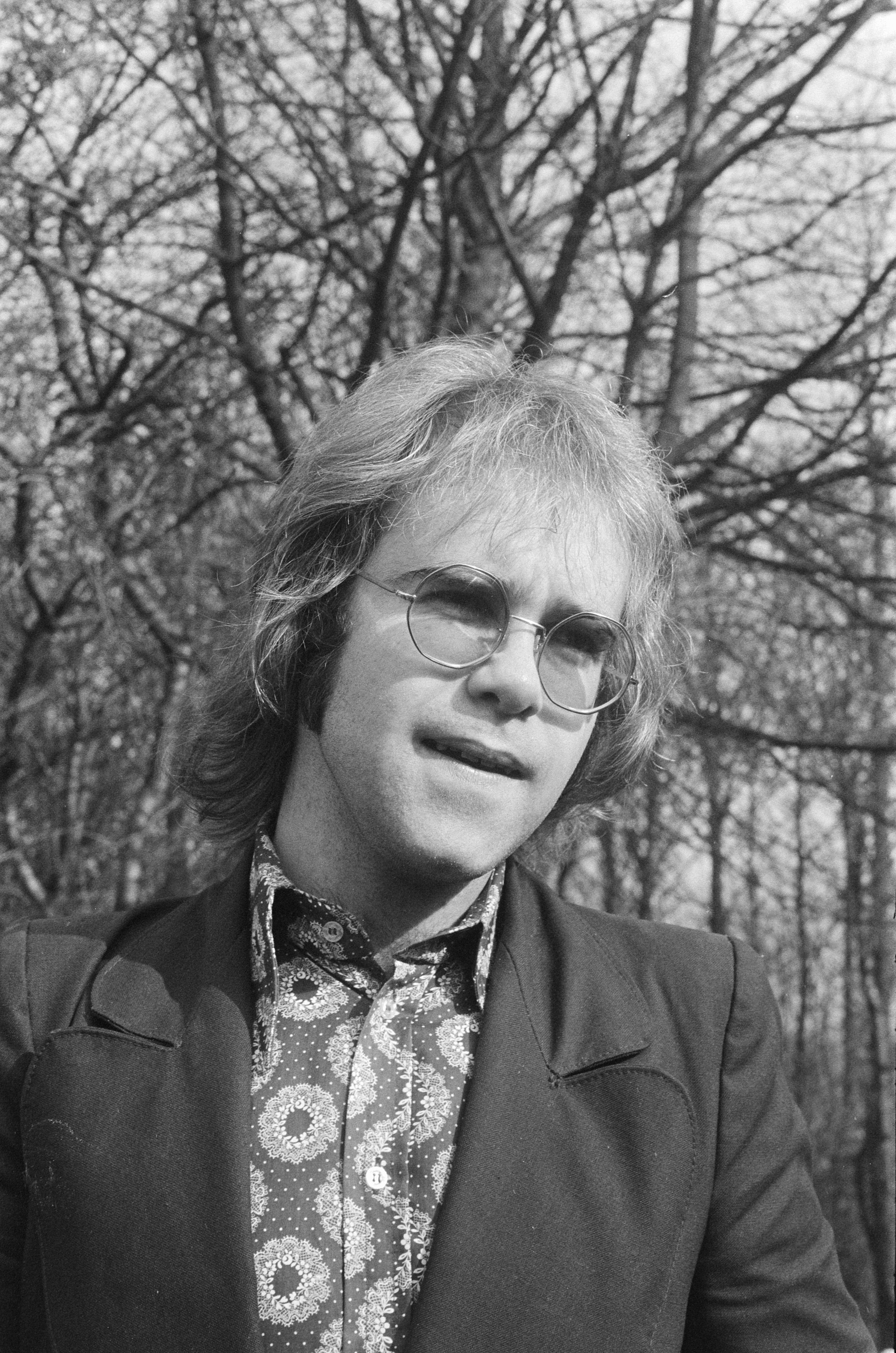
May 12, 1968: Reggie Dwight of Pinner assumes stage name "Elton John"

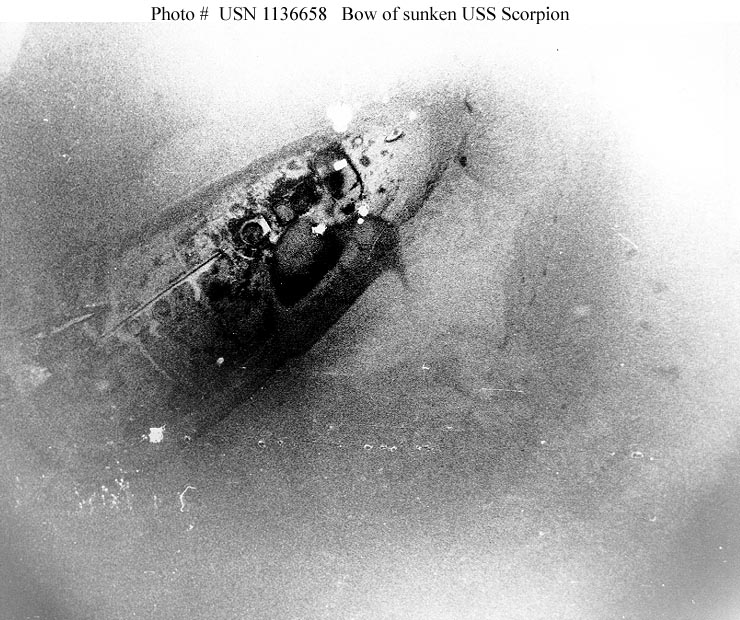
May 22, 1968: USS Scorpion nuclear submarine sank with all 99 of its crew

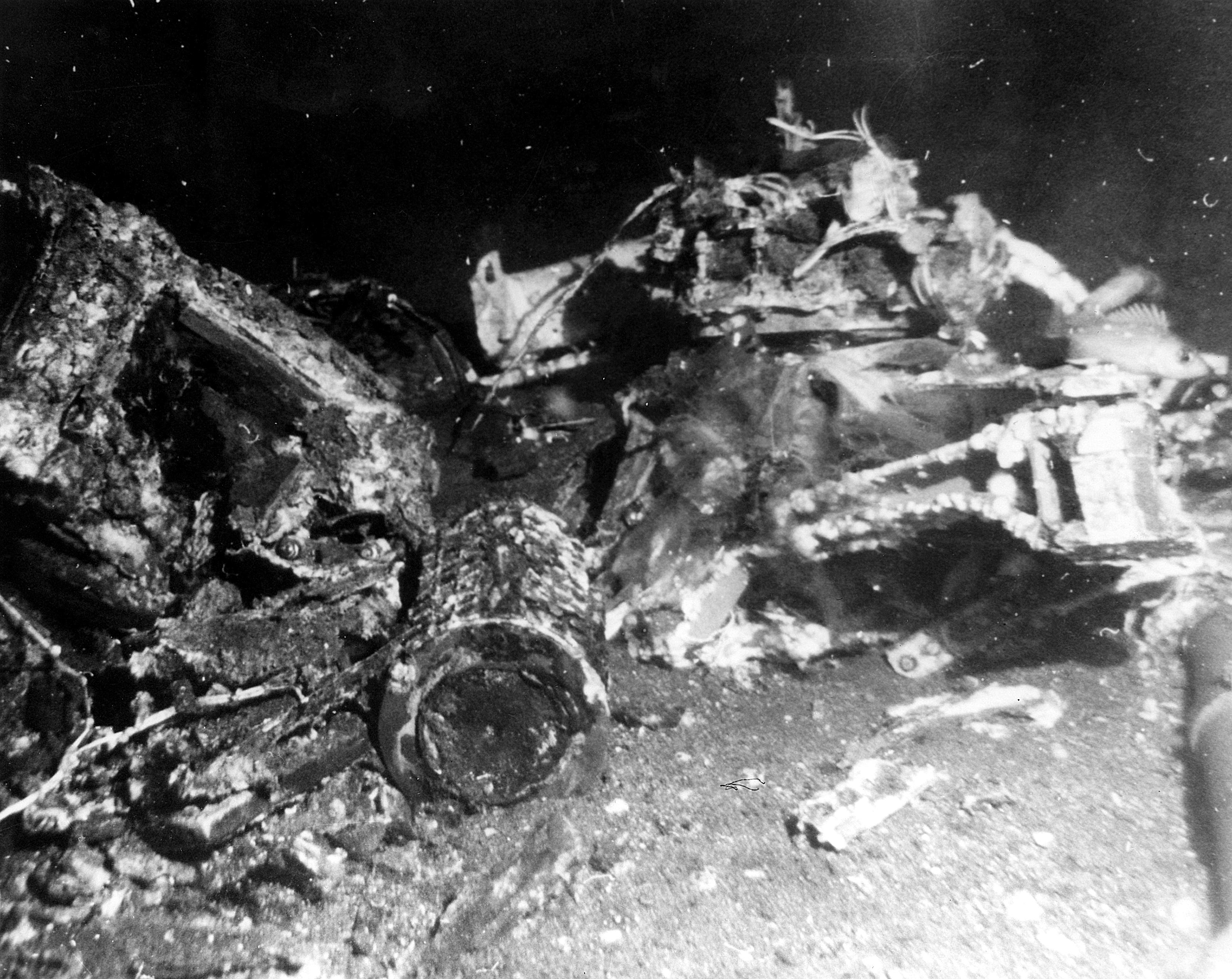
May 18, 1968: Nuclear-powered Nimbus-B destroyed before it can hit California

The following events occurred in May 1968:

== May 1, 1968 (Wednesday) ==
- In Dallas, at its first meeting since its creation through a merger, the United Methodist Church removed its rule that Methodist ministers could not drink alcohol nor smoke tobacco.
- CARIFTA, the Caribbean Free Trade Association, was formally created as an agreement between Antigua and Barbuda, Barbados, Guyana, and Trinidad and Tobago.
- RAF Strike Command was created within the United Kingdom's Royal Air Force by the consolidation of RAF Bomber Command and RAF Fighter Command.
- Born: Oliver Bierhoff, German soccer football striker and national team member who scored the first "golden goal" in international play; in Karlsruhe
- Died: Jack Adams, 73, Canadian ice hockey player, Detroit Red Wings head coach, and Hockey Hall of Fame inductee; the National Hockey League's award for the coach of the year is named in his honor.

== May 2, 1968 (Thursday) ==
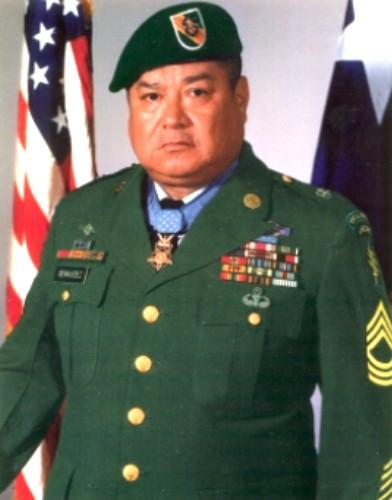
Staff Sgt. Benavidez

- Staff Sergeant Roy Benavidez of the U.S. Army's 5th Special Forces Group distinguished himself in battle near Loc Ninh in South Vietnam when he rescued 8 survivors of a 12-man Special Forces team that was surrounded by 1,000 enemy troops. Despite being off duty, Benavidez volunteered to travel by helicopter with the rescue team and was wounded four different times in the course of an 8-hour exchange of gunfire, but administered first aid to the other wounded officers, held off attackers by firing back and calling in airstrikes, secured classified documents, and dragged and carried wounded men to safety. It would not be until 1981 that Benavidez would receive the Medal of Honor for his heroism.
- A newspaper advertisement in The New York Times, paid for by New York City real estate investor Lawrence Wien on behalf of the "Committee for a Reasonable World Trade Center", urged the public to demand that construction of the World Trade Center be limited to two buildings no taller than 900 feet (270 m) rather than the planned 1,350 feet (410 m). An illustration of a jet flying straight toward one of the towers was featured in the ad, inadvertently warning of what would happen more than 33 years later, and the accompanying text commented "Consider the case of the 'Mountain' being built downtown," and after noting "that air traffic patterns will have to change, landing approaches will have to be altered, minimum altitudes in the area will be affected," commented that "If you're concerned about TV reception and safe air travel, write to the Governor today. Before it's too late."
- Regular television broadcasting was introduced to Israel with the debut of Channel 1 of the Israel Broadcasting Authority. The launch date, planned just nine weeks earlier, was set for Israeli Independence Day, which was celebrated annually on 5th day of Iyar of the Hebrew calendar and fell on May 2 in 1968. Live coverage of the independence day military parade in Jerusalem was the first program. The first station-produced entertainment series would be Siach Lochamim, a drama, in 1969.
- Protocol 4 of the European Convention on Human Rights went into effect for member nations of the Council of Europe, with the signatory nations agreeing to prohibit debtor's prisons, to not restrict their populations from traveling inside or outside their country, to prohibit the expulsion of a citizen, and to prohibit the deportation of groups of foreigners on the basis of nationality. Four nations— the United Kingdom, Switzerland, Turkey and Greece—have never ratified the protocol.
- John Boozer of the Philadelphia Phillies became the first Major League Baseball player since 1944 (and only the second in MLB history) to be ejected from a game for violation of the spitball rule, after coming in briefly as a relief pitcher in a 3 to 0 loss to the host New York Mets. Only three other players (Nels Potter in 1944, Phil Regan later in 1968, and Gaylord Perry in 1982) have been ejected from an MLB game under the spitball rule.
- The Poor People's March on Washington, its start postponed after the assassination of Martin Luther King, started from Memphis, Tennessee with a group of 8 chartered buses and ended the day at the town of Marks, Mississippi. Because of inadequate supplies for spending the night, half of the group of 600 returned to Memphis.
- Student protests in France led the administrators of the Paris University at Nanterre to temporarily shut down the educational institution. Instead of quelling the demonstrations, the act led to more protests and the calling of riot police by the university.
- At the University of Oxford, the Christ Church Picture Gallery, designed by Philip Powell and Hidalgo Moya, was opened.
- Born: Eric Holcomb, U.S. politician, Governor of Indiana 2017 to 2025; in Indianapolis

== May 3, 1968 (Friday) ==
- Braniff Flight 352 crashed near Dawson, Texas, killing all 85 people on board. The turboprop Lockheed L-188A Electra took off on a scheduled flight from Houston to Dallas at 4:11 p.m. but flew into a severe thunderstorm 90 miles (140 km) from its destination and broke up in midair. There were no survivors. Investigations would later reveal that the accident was caused by structural over-stress and failure of the airframe while attempting recovery from loss of control during a steep 180-degree turn executed in an attempt to escape the weather.
- A group of 500 students at the Sorbonne in Paris, France, protested against the closure of Paris University at Nanterre and the proposed expulsion of some students. Police arrived to disperse the protesters, and "the first riot of mai 68 ensued" and led to riots and university closures across the country.
- The first heart transplant in the United Kingdom was performed by Dr. Donald Ross and a team of surgeons at the National Heart Hospital in London. The patient, Frederick West, would survive for 46 days until dying from complications of an infection.
- The United States and North Vietnam agreed that their representatives would meet in Paris on May 10 to begin the first discussions on the format for peace talks to end the Vietnam War.
- After funding restraints were placed imposed on the Apollo Applications Program, a holding plan was implemented for the remainder of Fiscal Year 1968, to maintain a reasonable balance in program content while avoiding major cuts to work in progress.
- Died: Leonid Sabaneyev, 86, Russian mathematician and classical composer

== May 4, 1968 (Saturday) ==
- The 94th Kentucky Derby was won by Dancer's Image. Despite the thoroughbred's history of pain in his ankles, jockey Bobby Ussery rode to victory and finished 1½ lengths ahead of Forward Pass. Three days later, Dancer's Image would be disqualified after failing a drug test and Forward Pass would be declared the winner.
- The Pittsburgh Pipers won the first championship of the American Basketball Association by defeating the New Orleans Buccaneers, 122–113, in the seventh and deciding game of the finals. A crowd of 11,457 (the largest crowd of the season for the Pipers) watched at Pittsburgh Civic Arena.

== May 5, 1968 (Sunday) ==
- Four journalists— three from Australia and one from England— were murdered in Saigon by Viet Cong guerrillas after their mini-jeep drove into a trap in the city's Cholon sector. Killed in an execution were Reuters reporters Ron Lamary of England and Bruce Pigott; Michael Birch of the Australian Associated Press; and John Cantwell, Australian correspondent for Time magazine. A fifth journalist, freelancer Frank Palmos of Australia, pretended to be dead and would survive to tell what happened.
- The May Offensive was launched after midnight by North Vietnam and the Viet Cong, initiating a second phase of January's Tet Offensive, with an attack on 119 targets throughout South Vietnam, including the capital, Saigon.
- A Grumman Gulfstream II became the first executive jet to cross the Atlantic Ocean.
- Died: Albert Dekker, 62, American character actor on stage, film and television, was found hanged in his apartment in Hollywood.

== May 6, 1968 (Monday) ==
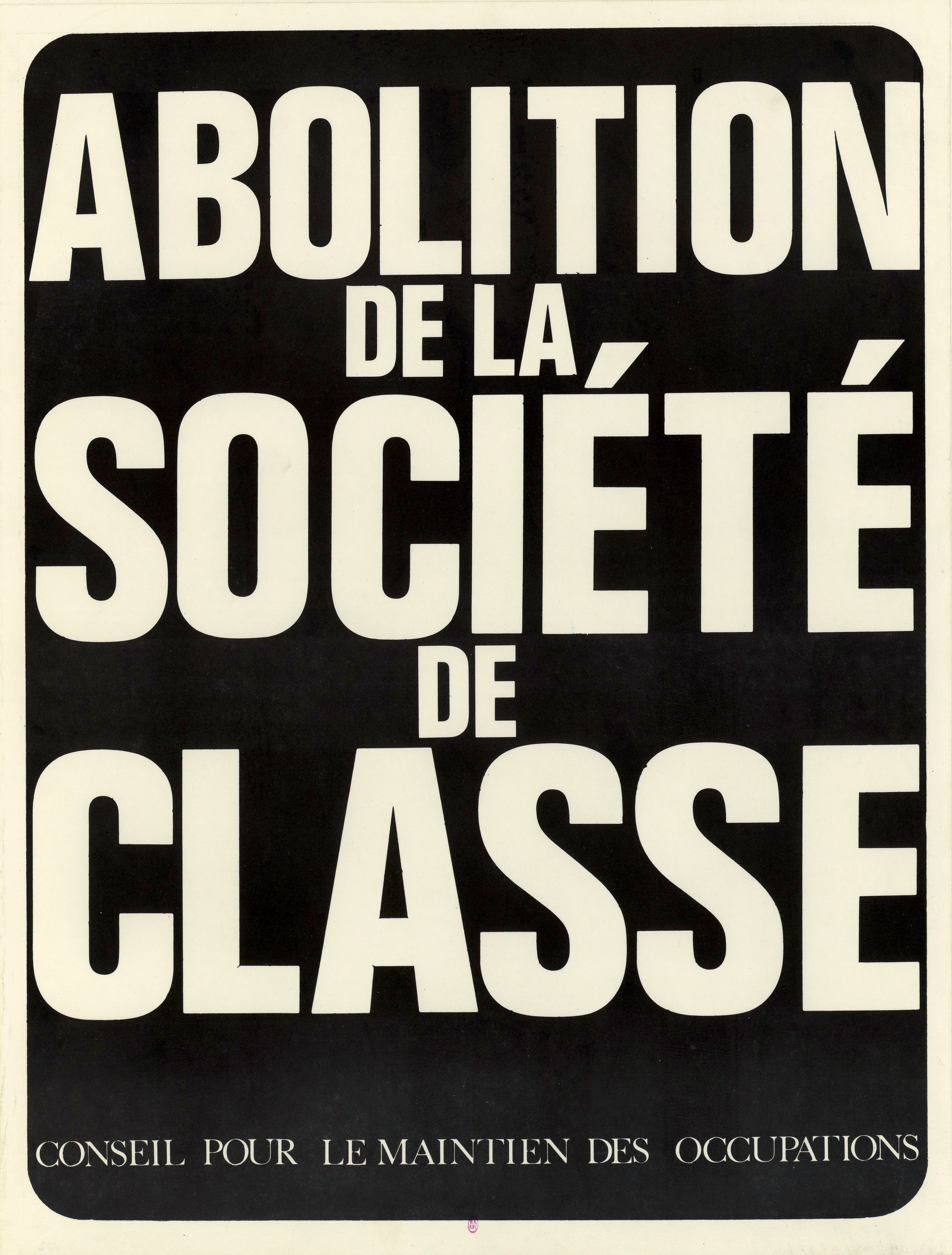
UNEF poster ("Abolish of classes of society"), from the Council for the preservation of occupations.

- The "May 68" crisis began in Paris, the Union Nationale des Étudiants de France (UNEF), France's largest student union, along with the union of university teachers, staged a march to protest against police actions at the Sorbonne. More than 20,000 protesters marched towards the Sorbonne, and the police charged the crowd with batons. When some protesters created barricades and threw paving stones, the police respond with tear gas. Hundreds of protesters were arrested.
- The sudden flooding of a coal mine at Hominy Falls, West Virginia trapped 25 miners underground. Fifteen were rescued after being trapped for five days, but the other 10, who had not been heard from since the accident, were believed to have died. To the surprise of rescue workers, six of the 10 men had survived for nearly a week and a half in the flooded mine after they had built a barricade and rationed what food they had left.
- The Argentine tanker MV Islas Orcadas exploded, caught fire and sank at Ensenada, Buenos Aires Province. Burning oil set two other tankers, MV Fray Luis Beltran and MV Cutral Co, on fire, sinking them as well. Although initial reports stated that 10 people had been killed and 26 injured, later reports revised the number of deaths to four crewmen on the Islas Orcadas.

== May 7, 1968 (Tuesday) ==
- In the People's Republic of China, the first of thousands of May 7 Cadre Schools, intended to "re-educate" party members, government bureaucrats, college students and professors, and other professionals with forced labor alongside peasant workers, was opened in Liuhe, a village in the Qing'an County of Heilongjiang Province. On October 5, Mao Zedong would publish a directive to require all able-bodied persons to perform agricultural labor. At the height of China's Cultural Revolution, millions of Chinese professionals were sent to cadre schools for at least a year. After the death of Lin Biao in 1971, many of the labor camps would be closed, and the remaining schools would be abolished on February 17, 1979.
- Forward Pass, who had crossed the finish line second in the Kentucky Derby, was declared the winner after a urinalysis by the Kentucky State Racing Commission found traces of the painkiller phenylbutazone in Dancer's Image. The $122,600 first prize and the $5,000 gold cup were ordered returned by Peter Fuller, the owner of Dancer's Image, and transferred to the Calumet Farm.
- As the May 68 protests expanded in Paris, students, teachers and young workers gathered at the Arc de Triomphe to demand that criminal charges against arrested students be dropped and that the authorities reopen Nanterre and Sorbonne universities.
- Born:
  - Eagle-Eye Cherry (stage name for Lanoo Cherry), Swedish singer and stage performer; in Stockholm
  - Traci Lords, American actress and singer; in Steubenville, Ohio

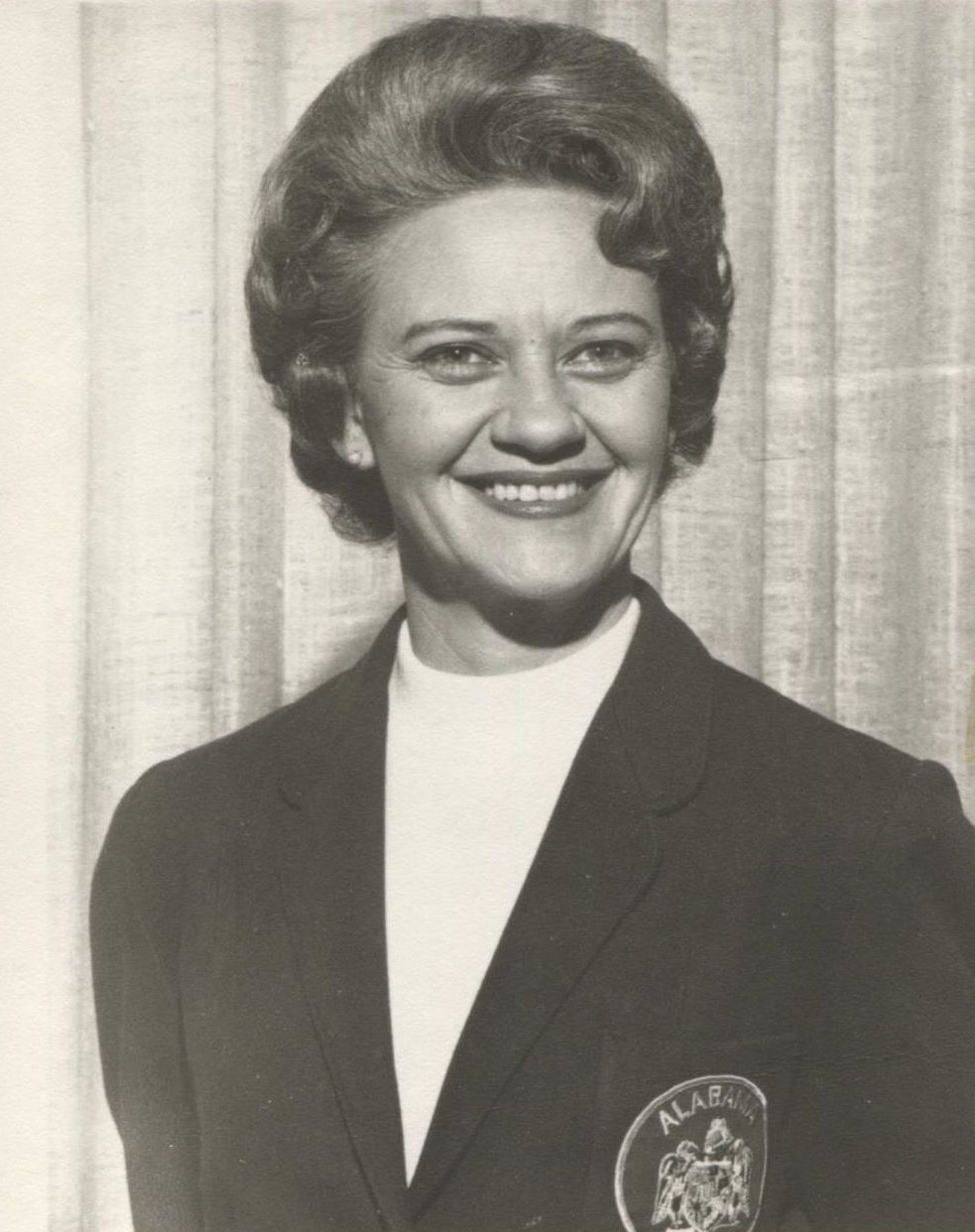
Governor Wallace

- Died:
  - Lurleen Wallace, 41, Governor of Alabama who was elected because her husband, George C. Wallace, could not serve consecutive terms, died of cancer after 15 months in office. Lieutenant Governor Albert Brewer was sworn in as the new governor the next day.
  - Mike Spence, 31, British racing driver, was killed while test driving a Lotus 56 turbocar in preparation for the Indianapolis 500

== May 8, 1968 (Wednesday) ==
- The possibility of a coup to overthrow the British government was suggested in a meeting arranged by newspaper publisher Cecil King, and would be recounted eight years later in book by King's editor-in-chief at the Daily Mirror, Hugh Cudlipp. According to Cudlipp's 1976 memoir Walking on Water, King met with British war hero Lord Mountbatten and outlined the problems with the administration of Prime Minister Harold Wilson. Cudlipp, who was present at the meeting, reported King's belief that there would be civil disorder and said that King asked Mountbatten "whether he would agree to be titular head of a new administration". Government adviser Solly Zuckerman, according to Cudlipp, told King that the idea was "rank treachery" and added, "I am a public servant and will have nothing to do with it", and that Mountbatten ended the meeting.
- Communist Party leaders from five of Eastern Europe's nations met in Moscow to discuss a response to the liberal reforms going on in Czechoslovakia during the Prague Spring. Soviet leader Leonid Brezhnev expressed his opinion that the situation was "exceptionally dangerous" and that counterrevolutionary party members were taking control of that Communist nation because of the indecisiveness of Czechoslovakia's Party Central Committee. "We must make sure that in the press in our countries", Brezhnev said, "in all our speeches, and in works put out by artistic unions and other organizations, nothing appears that might be construed as even slightly encouraging to the 'new model of socialism' which the anti-socialist elements in the CSSR claim to be creating." Walter Ulbricht (East Germany), Wladyslaw Gomulka (Poland) and Todor Zhivkov (Bulgaria) agreed with Brezhnev's assessment, while János Kádár of Hungary felt that Czechoslovakia's Action Program was a correction of its Party's mistakes rather than a counterrevolution.
- Jim "Catfish" Hunter of the Oakland A's hurled the ninth perfect game in Major League Baseball history, and the first in an American League game in more than 45 years. Playing at home in a 4–0 win over the Minnesota Twins, Hunter threw 11 strikeouts, including the last two players he faced, Bruce Look and Rich Reese. The feat was witnessed by only 6,298 paying customers. The feat of not allowing an opposing player to reach first base had last been accomplished in the majors by Sandy Koufax on September 9, 1965. For the next 13 years, including the entire 1970s, no more perfect games would be hurled in the American major leagues until May 15, 1981, by Len Barker.
- Officials at Arlington National Cemetery announced that the burial ground for American veterans would run out of space by 1985, even with a recent 192-acre expansion that had provided space for 60,000 more gravesites. The plan for 17-years in the future was to provide burial only for national heroes after 1985, and to limit interment at Arlington to the placement of cremated remains inside marble vaults.
- Born: Chris Lighty, American music executive and founder of Violator; in The Bronx (committed suicide, 2012)
- Died: Laurence M. Klauber, 84, American inventor of 10 patented electrical transmission devices (including the lightning arrester and the repeating fuse apparatus), mathematician (known for Klauber's triangle) and herpetologist and who was, at the time, the world's foremost authority on rattlesnakes as reptile curator at the San Diego Zoo.

== May 9, 1968 (Thursday) ==
- Candidates from the United Kingdom's Conservative Party overwhelmingly won municipal elections held in cities and towns in England and Wales in what was seen as an indication of a loss of confidence in the Labour Party and the government of Prime Minister Harold Wilson.
- William Deng Nhial, an opposition leader and president of the Sudan African National Union, was assassinated a few days after the SANU had gained five seats in parliamentary elections.
- Born:
  - Nataša Pirc Musar, President of Slovenia since 2022; in Ljubljana, SR Slovenia, SFR Yugoslavia
  - Marie-José Pérec, French Olympic athlete and three-time Olympic gold medalist for the women's 400m (1992 and 1996) and 200m (1996) race, and 1991 and 1995 World Champion in the 400m; in Basse-Terre, Guadeloupe
  - Scott Pruitt, American politician, lobbyist and attorney, Administrator of the Environmental Protection Agency from 2017 to 2018; in Danville, Kentucky
  - Fabrizio Quattrocchi, Italian security officer; in Catania (killed by Islamist militants in Iraq, 2004)
- Died:
  - Arthur Wergs Mitchell, 84, African-American U.S. Representative who served Illinois' 1st District from 1935 to 1943. He was the first black Democrat to be elected to Congress, and the only black Congressman during his eight years in office.
  - Marion Lorne, 82, American actress best known for her portrayal of "Aunt Clara", the confused witch, on the situation comedy Bewitched. She would posthumously receive the Emmy Award for Outstanding Supporting Actress in a Comedy Series.
  - Harold Gray, 74, American comic strip artist known for creating Little Orphan Annie, which first appeared in 1924
  - Mercedes de Acosta, 75, American poet, playwright, costume designer, and socialite
  - Finlay Currie, 90, Scottish stage, film, and television actor

== May 10, 1968 (Friday) ==
- The government of France issued an order prohibiting the state run ORTF from televising the student demonstrations in France, but ORTF radio correspondents were allowed to make live reports. The independent Radio Luxembourg sent its own journalists to France and kept them there despite harassment from the French police. Because of the live broadcasts, news of the rebellion spread from Paris to the rest of France and to media around the world. At nightfall, college and high school students began erecting makeshift barricades to seal off the streets around the Latin Quarter of Paris and to keep the police from entering the area. The action was imitative of the history lessons taught about the barricades erected by the crowds of the Paris Commune in 1871 and by the French Resistance fighters against the German occupation in 1944.
- J. Edgar Hoover, the U.S. director of the Federal Bureau of Investigation (FBI), began the secret COINTELPRO (counter-intelligence program) campaign to disrupt leftist groups in the U.S., particularly those composed of students or of African-Americans. The program's existence would be revealed after the theft, on March 8, 1971, of 1,200 documents from an FBI office in Media, Pennsylvania and the program would be discontinued soon after.
- Representatives of the United States and of North Vietnam met at Paris for the first time to discuss peace talks, and agreed that discussions would take place at the International Conference Center of the French Foreign Ministry, located in the former Hotel Majestic. W. Averell Harriman led the American delegation with the assistance of Cyrus Vance, and former North Vietnamese foreign minister Xuan Thuy was assisted by Colonel Ha Van Lau.
- The 1968 Cannes Film Festival opened.
- Born:
  - Richard Patrick, American musician and singer for Nine Inch Nails; in Needham, Massachusetts
  - Al Murray, English stand-up comedian; in Stewkley, Buckinghamshire
- Died: Marshal Vasily Sokolovsky, 70 Soviet Red Army general who commanded occupation troops in the Eastern sector of Germany after World War II and who unsuccessfully conducted the Berlin Blockade of 1948 in an attempt to take control of West Berlin

== May 11, 1968 (Saturday) ==
- The Montreal Canadiens swept the best-of-seven National Hockey League championship and the Stanley Cup, beating the new St. Louis Blues 3 to 2 in Game 4. The playoffs were the first since the 1967 NHL expansion, pitting the champion of the East Division (composed of all six of the NHL's original teams) against the champ from the West Division (made up of the six new teams). Despite being new, the Blues had lost two of the first three games only after the matches had gone into overtime.
- In England, Manchester City F.C. and Manchester United finished first and second in the regular season of England's The Football League, in a race that ended on the last day of the season. In the penultimate week, City (25–6–10) and United (24–8–9) had identical 56 point records. City beat Newcastle United, 4–3, on the road, but United lost at home, 2–1, to Sunderland.
- A crowd of 30,000 students marched to the parliamentary building in Bonn, the capital of West Germany, where members of the Bundestag were going to vote on the "Emergency Laws" (Notstandgesetze) which would authorize the West German executive branch to suspend basic rights during a national crisis. The "Sternmarsch" would be unsuccessful in blocking the enactment of the emergency measure.
- A fire killed 58 people and injured more than 200 at a wedding pavilion near the Indian city of Vijayawada in the state of Andhra Pradesh. Most of the dead were trampled when the guests rushed toward the few available exits in the pavilion, which was surrounded by a six-foot high fence. The bride and the bridegroom were able to escape.
- French police stormed the Latin Quarter of Paris in order to clear away the demonstrators in a chaotic end to the "Night of the barricades" that called worldwide attention to the chaos in France.
- The psychedelic rock band H. P. Lovecraft performed at The Fillmore in San Francisco. A recording of the event would be released 23 years later, in 1991.

== May 12, 1968 (Sunday) ==
- North Vietnamese soldiers overran the U.S. Special Forces camp at Kham Duc and shot down an American C-130 transport as it was evacuating the area, killing all 156 men on board. All but six of the people on the C-130 were South Vietnamese civilians who were being taken to safety. The disaster remains the worst air crash in Vietnamese history. In all, 500 survivors of Kham Duc were saved before the camp was overrun. U.S. Air Force Lieutenant Colonel Joe M. Jackson would receive the Medal of Honor for his daring rescue of the last three Americans to remain at Kham Duc, saving the USAF Combat Control Team after the last of the civilians had been evacuated.
- Elections took place in Panama for a new President and for a new National Assembly. Former President Arnulfo Arias received the most votes in a landslide over David Samudio Ávila, the candidate sponsored by outgoing president Marco Aurelio Robles. "Despite the all-out effort by the Robles administration to steal the election", a historian would later write, the victory of Arias "had been made official only after National Guard Commander Bolivar Vallarino insisted on a reasonably honest count of the ballots." Arias, however, would decline to honor the agreements that he had made with the Panamanian National Guard after being inaugurated on October 1, and would be removed from office by the Guard only 10 days later.
- In the West African nation of Dahomey (now Benin), the ruling military junta annulled the results of the May 5 presidential election because nearly three-quarters of the eligible voters didn't participate. Basile Adjou Moumouni had won the overwhelming majority of the votes cast (241,273 out of 295,667 or 84%). The junta leader, Colonel Alphonse Alley, refused to recognize the result because most of the 1.13 million registered voters had not shown up on election day. The junta picked its own civilian candidate, Dr. Émile Zinsou and scheduled a referendum for July 28 with the choice of yes or no for Zinsou to be elected.
- Reginald Dwight, who played the piano for the English R&B group Bluesology, chose the stage name that would make him famous. He was on an airplane flight back to London after his final concert with Bluesology in Edinburgh. Following a discussion with his bandmates, Dwight chose to use the first names of saxophonist Elton Dean and lead vocalist John Baldry to coin the pseudonym Elton John.
- The Israeli government declared the 28th of Iyar (which fell on May 31 in 1968) as the national holiday Jerusalem Day, to commemorate the June 7, 1967 (28 Iyar 5727 on the Hebrew Calendar) capture of East Jerusalem.
- AS Saint-Étienne, which had won the 1967–68 regular season in French soccer football, defeated Girondins de Bordeaux, 2–1, in the championship final of the Coupe de France tournament.
- Born: Tony Hawk, American skateboarder; in San Diego

== May 13, 1968 (Monday) ==
- An advance team for the Poor People's March on Washington began erecting prefabricated buildings to create "Resurrection City" as temporary housing for the marchers to stay in for five weeks. Governmental permission had been obtained for the occupation of 15 acres at West Potomac Park near the Lincoln Memorial. The organizers had obtained a permit from the National Park Service to remain for 37 days.
- In France, a one-day general strike was called by the Confédération Générale du Travail (CGT) and the Force Ouvrière (CGT-FO) as organized labor groups walked off of their jobs as a show of support to striking students. Prime Minister Georges Pompidou announced the release of prisoners and the reopening of the Sorbonne, but protests continued.
- The Paris Peace Talks between the United States and North Vietnam opened at the conference center on Avenue Kléber, and would result in a preliminary agreement on October 27.
- Born:
  - Paul Tibbitt, American animator and voice actor, best known for working on the animated series SpongeBob SquarePants; in Los Angeles County, California
  - Scott Morrison, 30th Prime Minister of Australia from 2018 to 2022; in Waverley, New South Wales
  - Sonja Zietlow, German television host; in Bonn

== May 14, 1968 (Tuesday) ==
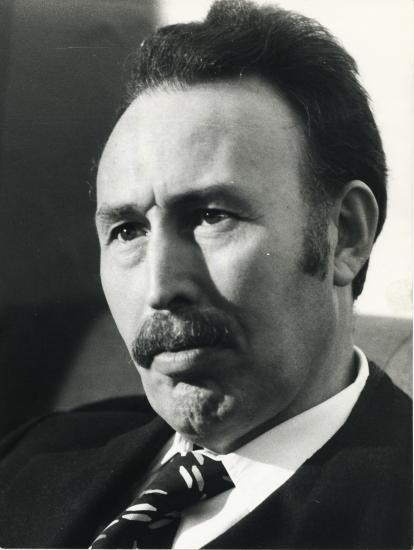
President Boumédiène

- Algeria's President Houari Boumédiène ordered the nationalization of 14 foreign energy companies operating in the North African nation and assigned their assets to the government monopoly Sonatrach (Société Nationale pour la Recherche, la Production, le Transport, la Transformation, et la Commercialisation des Hydrocarbures) (National Society for the Research, Production, Transport, Refining and Marketing of Hydrocarbons).
- Workers at the Sud Aviation aircraft factory near Nantes followed the example of France's university students and went on a sit-down strike, becoming "the very first of the French factories to go on strike" and setting a precedent that would soon spread to the Renault automobile factories, then to western France and eventually to the entire nation.
- In Tokyo, Japan's Matsushita Electric Industrial Company (now Panasonic) introduced what was, at the time, the world's smallest television set. The tiny device, "so small it can be slipped into a coat pocket", had a 1 1/2 inch (3.8 cm) screen and weighed 1 1/3 pounds (600 grams).
- The United Kingdom's 37-year-old National Liberal Party, led by M.P. David Renton, voted for its dissolution, and merged into the Conservative Party. In the 1966 election, NLP candidates won just 3 of the 630 seats in the House of Commons.
- The 56-story tall Toronto-Dominion Bank Tower, the first of six office buildings in the Toronto-Dominion Centre on Wellington Street West, was opened.
- The Beatles announced the creation of Apple Records, a division of Apple Corps Ltd, at a press conference in New York City.
- Died: Husband E. Kimmel, 86, retired U.S. Navy Admiral who was blamed for failing to prevent the Japanese attack on Pearl Harbor in 1941

== May 15, 1968 (Wednesday) ==
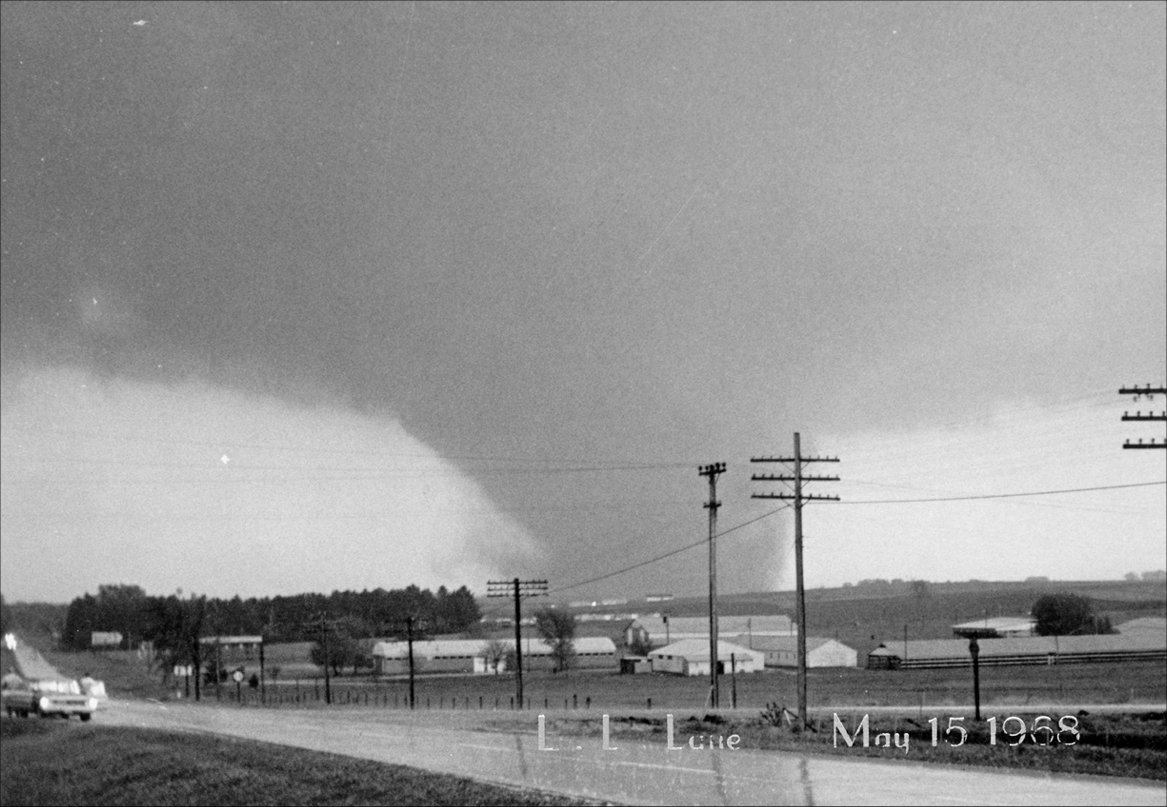
May 15, 1968: An F5 tornado near Charles City, Iowa

- An outbreak of tornadoes killed 70 people in the American Midwest and South. The heaviest damage was in Jonesboro, Arkansas, where 33 people were killed and 350 injured, and 12 people died and 367 were hurt in Charles City, Iowa. In the little town of Wapella, Illinois, all of the buildings were damaged or destroyed except for the high school.
- The U.S. Central Intelligence Agency shut down Radio Americas, a station that had gone on the air in 1960 as part of a campaign against Cuba's leader, Fidel Castro. Originally called "Radio Swan" because its transmitter was located on one of the uninhabited Swan Islands off of the coast of Honduras, the station "spearheaded anti-Castro rumor campaigns" and even "supplied its listeners with sabotage instructions".
- The first human lung transplant ever performed in Europe (and only the fourth worldwide) took place at the Royal Infirmary in Edinburgh, where 15-year-old Alex Smith was given a lung hours after Anse Main, an 18-year-old woman, had died of an overdose of drugs.
- The Prize in Economic Science dedicated to the memory of Alfred Nobel, sponsored by the Sveriges Riksbank, was created as a sixth category of Nobel Prize to be administered by the Nobel Foundation.
- Born: Seth Putnam, American grindcore musician; in Newton, Massachusetts (died of a heart attack, 2011)

== May 16, 1968 (Thursday) ==
- Two weeks after students in France had closed most of the nation's universities during the May 68 student strike, employees seized control of the automobile factories owned by the nationalized Renault company, taking control at Boulogne-Billancourt, Rouen, Le Havre, Le Mans and Flins. Employees of Sud-Aviation, the state operated aircraft factory at Nantes, welded the factory gates shut. Workers struck two factories at Lyon, several newspapers in Paris, and shut down Orly, the Paris international airport.
- An 8.3 magnitude earthquake killed at least 47 people in northern Japan after striking at 9:49 in the morning. Deaths were caused both by collapsed buildings and a tsunami. The heaviest damage was at the city of Aomori, and the quake was the strongest in more than four years.
- In the U.S., the United Auto Workers was ousted from the AFL–CIO labor union conglomerate. UAW President Walter P. Reuther, a longtime foe of AFL–CIO President George Meany, received a letter of expulsion because the UAW had not paid its $90,000 per month dues for three months.
- Ronan Point, a 23-storey tower block in Canning Town, east London, UK, partially collapsed after a gas explosion, killing five people. The disaster would highlight an area of design which had not previously been considered and which would lead to changes in legislation in the UK and other countries.
- ESRO 2B, a satellite built in Europe for the European Space Research Organisation, was launched into orbit from Vandenberg Air Force Base in California.
- Born: Chingmy Yau, Hong Kong film actress; in British Hong Kong

== May 17, 1968 (Friday) ==
- A group of American anti-war demonstrators, the Catonsville Nine, entered the Selective Service offices in Catonsville, Maryland, took draft records, and burned them with napalm. News footage of the action was shot by Baltimore's WBAL-TV. Those involved included Father Daniel Berrigan, a Jesuit priest, his brother Philip Berrigan, a former Josephite priest, and artist Tom Lewis.
- The May 68 social revolt and labor unrest in France spread as the number of striking laborers reached 100,000 employees of dozens of factories. As the takeover continued, red flags were hoisted in and around Lyon over the Rhône-Poulenc chemical plant; the Berliet truck factory; and the Rhodiaceta textile factory. The airports at Orly and at Le Bourget remained closed.
- Born: Constance Menard, French professional equestrienne; in Saumur, Maine-et-Loire département

== May 18, 1968 (Saturday) ==
- Mattel's Hot Wheels toy cars were introduced, and would become one of the best-selling line of toys in history.
- Nimbus B, a weather satellite powered by two nuclear fueled generators, was launched at 1:23 a.m. from California's Vandenberg Air Force Base but failed to reach orbit after the malfunction of one of the rocket boosters, and began its re-entry toward North America. In order to prevent radioactive contaminants from being scattered across the Pacific Coast, ground control sent a destruct order to the rocket boosters two minutes after the launch. The satellite plunged into the ocean, its nuclear cargo intact, about 95 miles (153 km) west of Los Angeles, and would finally be located and recovered on October 9.
- Sirhan Bishara Sirhan, a 24-year-old Jordanian citizen who had been raised in a Palestinian Christian family and who had lived in the U.S. for 12 years, made the first handwritten entries in a journal that would be introduced at his trial for the assassination of Robert F. Kennedy. Less than three weeks before the shooting, Sirhan was in his Pasadena, California, home and wrote "My determination to eliminate R.F.K. is becoming more the more of an unshakable obsession... Robert F. Kennedy must be assassinated before 5 June 68".
- The two-week long Cannes Film Festival ended on its 9th day after members of the judges panel resigned in sympathy for striking French students and workers, and several hundred workers in the film industry seized control of the Palais des Festivals et des Congrès. An attempt to resume the festival was halted the next day when film technicians (including projectionists) refused to work, and directors of the films scheduled for performance refused to allow the screening.
- The first Miami Pop Festival was staged at the Gulfstream Park horseracing track at Hallandale, Florida. The rock concert included The Jimi Hendrix Experience, Frank Zappa and the Mothers of Invention, The Crazy World of Arthur Brown, and Blue Cheer. Their return performances for the second day of the scheduled two day concert were rained out, but the success of the first event led to a larger second Miami Pop Festival that took place at the end of the year.
- Dogpatch USA, a theme park based on the comic strip Li'l Abner, was opened in the Ozark Mountains near Harrison, Arkansas in neighboring Newton County. The comic strip would cease publication in 1977, and Dogpatch USA would close after the 1993 season. During the park's existence, the post office at Marble Falls, with a zip code of 72648, was officially called Dogpatch, Arkansas.
- Nguyen Van Loc resigned as Prime Minister of South Vietnam, along with his entire cabinet.
- Dorothy Anstett of Kirkland, Washington, won the 17th Miss USA pageant at Miami.
- Born: Elona Gjebrea; Albanian politician of the Socialist Party of Albania; in Tirana

== May 19, 1968 (Sunday) ==
- Nigerian forces captured Port Harcourt and surrounded the secessionist Republic of Biafra. The blockade of Biafra would lead to a severe famine.
- In the Italian general election, the Christian Democrat party retained control of the lower house of Parliament by winning a plurality (38%) of the vote. Aldo Moro remained Prime Minister as his three party coalition retained a slim majority of the 325 seats in the Italian Senate and the 630 in the Chamber of Deputies.
- Fifteen people, including seven children, were trampled to death in Cairo at the Archangel Michael Coptic Christian Church as thousands of people entered the church to see a reported Marian apparition, Our Lady of Zeitoun.
- The 1968 AFC Asian Cup soccer tournament was won by the host team, Iran.
- Born: Kyle Eastwood, American jazz musician; in Los Angeles

== May 20, 1968 (Monday) ==
- Financed by a group of wealthy exiles from Haiti, a poorly handled attempt was made to overthrow the dictatorship of François "Papa Doc" Duvalier, starting with a failed aerial bombardment of the capital, Port-au-Prince. According to one account, a B-25 dropped a single explosive "which blew one more hole in an eroded road", followed by a package of leaflets "which did not scatter because the invaders had not untied the bundle before dropping it". An invasion force came ashore and temporarily captured the port city of Cap-Haïtien. One bomb dropped on Port-au-Prince destroyed some private rooms in Duvalier's residence, and "an undetermined number of people were killed". The 35-man invasion force would be defeated the next day.
- The Children's Television Workshop (CTW), now known as Sesame Workshop (SW), was founded by Joan Ganz Cooney and Lloyd Morrisett. The company is an American nonprofit organization that has been responsible for the production of several educational children's programs—including its first and best-known, Sesame Street—having been televised internationally since its debut in 1969.
- The 1968 Giro d'Italia cycle race began in Campione with ten 13-man teams. Eddy Merckx and Vittorio Adorni of the Faema team would finish first and second on June 11 in the race's conclusion in Naples.
- Born:
  - Timothy Olyphant, American TV and film known for the series Justified and the film Hitman; in Honolulu
  - Waisale Serevi, Fijian rugby sevens star and World Rugby Hall of Fame member; in Suva

== May 21, 1968 (Tuesday) ==
- A massive rescue operation by ships from four nations saved all 178 passengers and crew of the Norwegian cruise ship Blenheim after the vessel caught fire in the North Sea, midway through its voyage from Newcastle to Oslo. Two fishing trawlers from Denmark, the Gine Wulf and the Taily, arrived first, and the supply ship Smith Lloyd from the Netherlands saved others and towed the ship to a safe port. Ships from West Germany and destroyers and helicopters from the United Kingdom's Royal Navy saved the others.
- France's President Charles de Gaulle exercised his constitutional power to grant amnesty for the leaders of the students who led the strike against French universities, but the number of French workers on strike increased to 8,000,000 as two million people walked off of their jobs during the day. Banks were closed as panicking depositors sought to withdraw their money, and the stock market in Paris did not open for trading.
- Born: Julie Vega (stage name for Julie Pearl Apostol Postigo), Filipina child actress who died of illness at the age of 16; in Quezon City (d. 1985)
- Died: Arturo Basile, 54, Italian symphony orchestra conductor, was killed in a single car accident along with his passenger, opera soprano Marika Galli, while driving near the Italian city of Vercelli. Basile, who had been negotiating with New York's Metropolitan Opera to fill the vacancy left by the May 13 death of Italian opera conductor Franco Patane in a car accident. reportedly swerved off of the road and crashed into a large stone.

== May 22, 1968 (Wednesday) ==
- The American nuclear-powered submarine USS Scorpion sank 400 miles (640 km) from the Azores, killing all 99 of its crew. A search would be abandoned on June 5; the remains of the Scorpion would not be located for another four months. It would later be revealed that at 1844 UTC, eight listening stations had recorded "a major acoustic event" below the sea surface "followed by lesser acoustic events". The U.S. Navy's classified investigative report would be released on October 25, 1993, revealing its conclusion that the Scorpion was probably destroyed by one of its own torpedoes.
- All 23 people on board Los Angeles Airways Flight 841, a Sikorsky S-61L were killed in the worst helicopter accident in American history as the aircraft crashed onto Minnesota Avenue in Paramount, California. The 20 passengers were being shuttled by the crew of three from Disneyland to the Los Angeles International Airport and were halfway through their 32 miles (51 km) trip when the helicopter exploded and broke apart at 5:47 in the afternoon. The dead included the mayor of Red Bluff, California and eight members of a family from Canton and Steubenville, Ohio who were on vacation. An 20-month investigation by the National Transportation Safety Board would conclude that one of the five blades on the main rotor came loose from the damper that held it to the spinning rotor head, then became entangled in the rotor, throwing the other blades "entirely out of balance"; "The aircraft, completely uncontrollable, crashed in a near-vertical descent," the NTSB concluded, and added that "It was a one-in-a-million accident, with no precedent."
- The pro-British United Bermuda Party won 30 of the seats in Bermuda's new, 40-seat House of Assembly, while the Progressive Labour Party, which advocated independence for the British colony, got the remainder. The election was the first under a new one-man, one-vote law. The winners were 26 white and 14 black candidates (7 of whom were UBP members).
- Daniel Cohn-Bendit, the leader of France's May 68 protests was barred from re-entering the country after completing a tour of Europe to talk with other student protesters. When he tried to cross into Forbach from the border station shared with Saarbrücken, West Germany, "Danny the Red", who did not have French citizenship at that time, found that he had been declared an "undesirable" by the Interior Ministry.
- By 11 votes, the government of Prime Minister Pompidou of France survived a vote on another censure motion, as 233 of the members of the 485 seat National Assembly voted in favor, but fell short of the 244 required.
- Born: Graham Linehan, Irish comedian and writer; in Dublin
- Died: USMC Lieutenant David Westphall, 28, was killed along with 16 other United States Marines in a Viet Cong ambush near An Dinh in South Vietnam. His parents, Victor and Jeanne Westphall, would use the life insurance proceeds for their son to build the first memorial to Americans killed in the Vietnam War, and would build a white chapel on land that they owned near Angel Fire, New Mexico.

== May 23, 1968 (Thursday) ==
- For the first time, an enemy aircraft was successfully shot down by a ship-launched surface-to-air missile, a RIM-8 Talos missile fired from U.S. Navy guided-missile cruiser USS Long Beach (CGN-9) safely out to sea off of the coast of North Vietnam 65 nautical miles (almost 75 miles or 120 kilometers) from its target, a North Vietnamese MiG flying over North Vietnam.
- The International Committee of the Red Cross (ICRC) launched the "SOS Biafra" campaign, requesting the Red Cross humanitarian aid societies in 30 nations to work toward getting "massive material and financial support" from national governments to prevent famine and disease in the area that had seceded from Nigeria.
- Echo 1, the world's first communications satellite, fell out of orbit and burned up upon re-entry to the atmosphere. Launched on August 12, 1960, the 100 foot (30 m) polyethylene terephthalate (Mylar) covered balloon had sustained punctures from its encounters with space dust at high speeds, and dropped to lower orbits over time as it deflated. On its re-entry, it passed over northern California, southern Arizona and Mexico's Jalisco state before burning up over the west coast of South America.
- Born: John Ortiz, American film actor; in Brooklyn
- Died: Henry Dumas, 33, African American poet, novelist and short fiction writer, was shot and killed by a New York City Transit Police officer while at the 125th Street Station of the New York City Subway. Dumas, a counselor for Southern Illinois University, was visiting New York when the officer, Peter Blenkowski, shot Dumas three times after an altercation. Blenkowski claimed self-defense.

== May 24, 1968 (Friday) ==
- President Charles de Gaulle appeared on national television in France and made a plea to viewers for help in ending the strike by 10,000,000 workers and rioting in French cities. He announced a referendum for June and asked for voters to approve a grant of emergency power to force reforms and to halt the "roll to civil war". "Frenchmen, French women", he said, "you will deliver your verdict by a vote. In case your reply is 'no', it follows that I would no longer assume my functions." In the hours leading up to the speech, thousands of demonstrators, many from outside the city, were converging on the center of Paris, while riot police prepared to contain the violence. One historian would observe later that De Gaulle "did not come over as a man in charge of the situation, but a mere mortal struggling for a way out... for the first time in his career de Gaulle seemed an anachronism."
- North Vietnam activated a new prisoner-of-war camp at Sơn Tây, 23 miles (37 km) northwest of Hanoi, and began the relocation of 55 of the 356 American POWs. The site, codenamed "Camp Hope", would be the object of an ultimately unsuccessful attempt (on November 21, 1970) by a Special Operations force to rescue the prisoners.

== May 25, 1968 (Saturday) ==
- The world's 17th human heart transplant was performed at the Medical College of Virginia by Dr. David M. Hume and Dr. Richard Lower, but the hospital initially refused to disclose the name of the recipient or the donor, and an armed guard was kept on the floor where the patient was recovering. Reporters soon learned from other sources that the recipient was a white man, Joseph G. Klett, and that the heart came from an African-American, Bruce O. Tucker, who had suffered a traumatic brain injury the day before the surgery and whose body was unclaimed; and then found the reason for the secrecy. William Tucker, the donor's brother, brought a lawsuit on behalf of the family on grounds that the heart had been removed without consent and that Bruce was technically alive when he was taken off of life support. The suit, Tucker v. Lower would be "the first case to present the question of the 'definition of death' in the context of organ transplantation". Four years to the day after Tucker's death, a Virginia jury would become "the first anywhere to accept the new medical concept of brain death, the idea that a man is no longer living if his brain is dead."
- 10-year-old Mary Bell committed the first of two child murders by strangling a four-year-old boy named Martin Brown in an upstairs bedroom of a derelict house located at 85 St. Margaret's Road in Newcastle upon Tyne, England. Brown's body was discovered by three children later in the day. He was lying on his back with his arms stretched above his head. Aside from specks of blood and foam around his mouth, no signs of violence were visible upon his body. A local workman named John Hall soon arrived on the scene; he attempted to perform CPR, however Brown was already dead.
- The incorporation of a new city with 30,000 residents, Sterling Heights, Michigan, was approved by voters in the Sterling Township of Macomb County. The election result was 3,492 in favor and 2,614 against, with the city to come into existence on July 1.
- In France, negotiations began between the Pompidou government, trade unions, and the Organisation patronale, leading to the Grenelle agreements on pay.
- Died: Charles K. Feldman, 63, American screen agent who formed the Famous Artists Corporation, and who later became a successful film producer, including The Seven Year Itch and the screen adaptation of A Streetcar Named Desire.

== May 26, 1968 (Sunday) ==
- In the premier international team event in women's tennis, Australia won The Federation Cup tennis tournament in Paris, defeating the Netherlands in a 3 to 0 sweep. Kerry Melville beat Marijke Jansen in an extra set to win the first match, and Margaret Court defeated Astrid Suurbeek in straight sets to win the second. Court and Melville beat the doubles team of Suurbeek and Lidy Venneboer in the third match to finish the sweep.

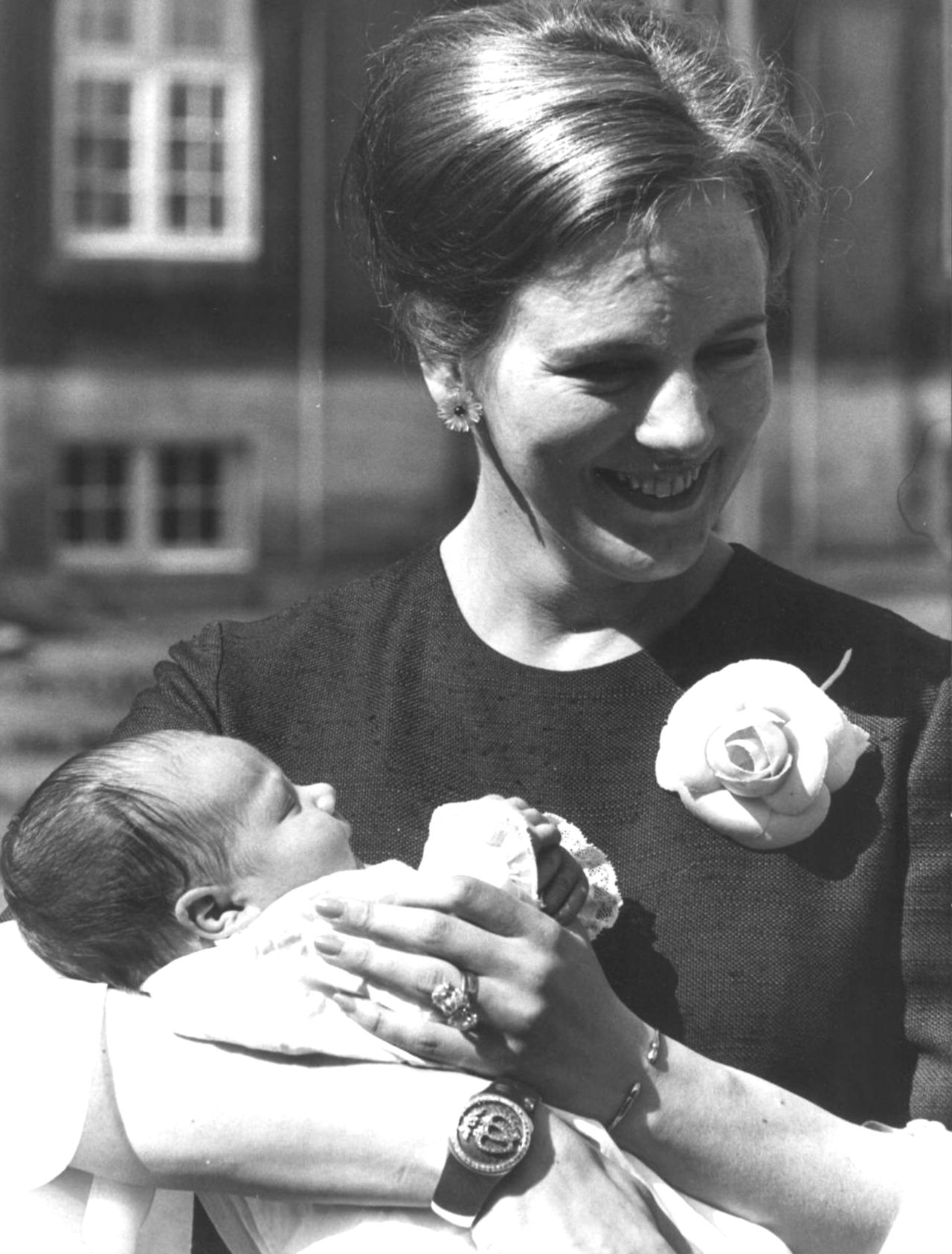
Princess Margrethe with Prince Frederik

- Born: Frederik X, King of Denmark, as the son of Princess Margrethe heir presumptive to the Danish throne and her consort Prince Henrik; in Copenhagen. Upon Queen Margrethe's abdication on January 14, 2024, Frederik would become the monarch and head of state of Denmark.
- Died: Little Willie John, 30, American R&B singer, died of a heart attack while in the Washington State Penitentiary in Walla Walla, Washington.

== May 27, 1968 (Monday) ==
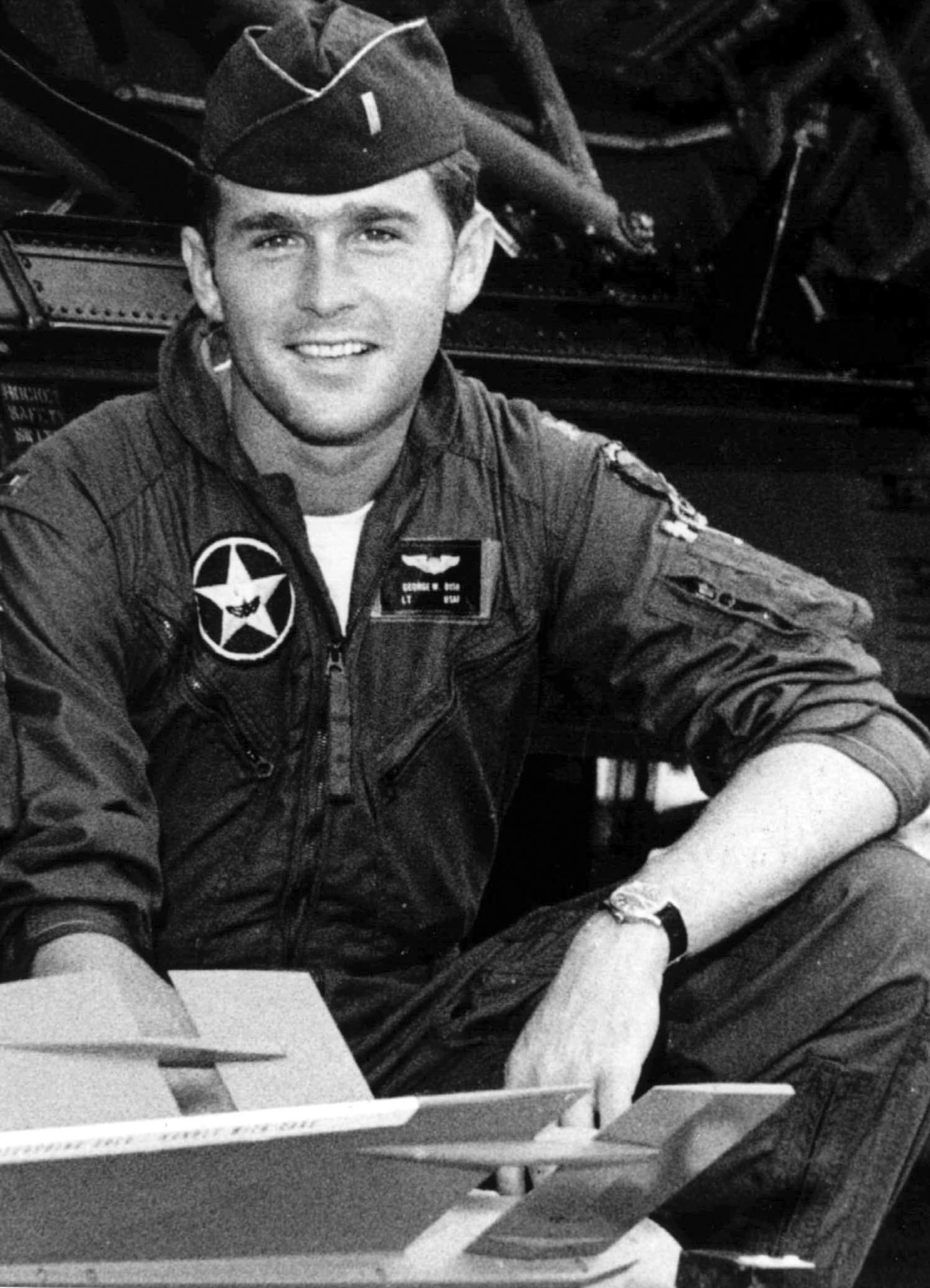
1st Lt. Bush

- Future U.S. President George W. Bush, then 22, enlisted in the Texas Air National Guard after his graduation from Yale University as an acceptable way to avoid the possibility of being sent to Vietnam. Like the sons of many other prominent Texans, he was assigned to the 147th Fighter Group, nicknamed "The Champagne Unit".
- Rioting began in Louisville, Kentucky after a crowd of 400 protesters, mostly black, gathered at 28th and Greenwood Streets, in the city's Parkland neighborhood. When the violence escalated, Mayor Kenneth A. Schmied established a curfew and requested Governor Louie B. Nunn to call out 700 Kentucky National Guard troops to enforce it. The rioting would end two days later; two people were killed.
- In Chicago, baseball's National League voted to expand to 12 teams and awarded franchises to San Diego and the first Major League Baseball team in Canada, the Montreal Expos, with both to begin play in 1969, with prospective owners to pay $10,000,000 apiece. Bids from Buffalo, Dallas and Milwaukee were rejected.
- The government of France and representatives of its striking trade unions informally settled on the Grenelle agreements that would end the strike in return for a 35 percent increase in the minimum wage and an average increase of 10% in overall wages.
- The U.S. Supreme Court ruled, in United States v. O'Brien, that the burning of a draft card in protest did not constitute constitutionally-protected free speech.
- Trần Văn Hương, a former schoolteacher, was sworn in as the new Prime Minister of South Vietnam.
- Born:
  - Frank Thomas, American first baseman, designated hitter and member of the Baseball Hall of Fame, nicknamed "The Big Hurt"; in Columbus, Georgia
  - Jeff Bagwell, American first baseman and member of the Baseball Hall of Fame; in Boston
  - Alex Murdaugh, American convicted murderer and former attorney; in Hampton, South Carolina
- Died: Sir Philip Vian, 73, British Royal Navy Admiral of the Fleet remembered for his command of the destroyer HMS Cossack in its rescue of 300 British seamen from the German prison ship Altmark on February 17, 1940

== May 28, 1968 (Tuesday) ==
- All 29 people on board were killed in the crash of a Garuda Indonesia Airlines Convair 990 Coronado, shortly after the jet took from Mumbai in India on a flight to Karachi in Pakistan. Debris from the plane fell onto the village of Bilalpada in the state of Maharashtra, killing one person on the ground.
- In France, François Mitterrand of the Federation of the Democratic and Socialist Left declared that "there was no more state" and said that he was ready to form a new government.
- Born: Kylie Minogue, Australian singer and actress; in Melbourne
- Died: Kees van Dongen, 91, Dutch-French painter, member of the Fauvist movement

== May 29, 1968 (Wednesday) ==
- A natural gas explosion in the Atlanta suburb of Hapeville, Georgia, killed seven children and two adults at a day care center, after a bulldozer operator accidentally punctured a gas line. The blast occurred as the first group of children were being evacuated from the building by employees. After a fire started, daycare center workers continued to go back into the building, and 22 of the 36 children in the building escaped injury.
- Manchester United F.C. became the first team from England to win the European Cup soccer competition, defeating Benfica of Portugal, 4 to 1, in front of 92,225 at Wembley Stadium in London. The score was tied, 1–1, at the end of 90 minutes, but George Best, Brian Kidd and Bobby Charlton scored three goals in extra time.
- France's President, Charles de Gaulle, postponed a meeting of the Council of Ministers, removed his personal papers from Élysée Palace and left Paris without telling his prime minister, Georges Pompidou, where he was going – which was in fact to the headquarters of the French Forces in Germany at Baden-Baden to assure himself of military support. Meanwhile, Pierre Mendès France stated that he was ready to form a new government that would include the French Communists party.
- The United Nations Security Council unanimously adopted comprehensive mandatory sanctions against Rhodesia and its white-minority government.
- Ireland's President, Éamon de Valera, opened the John F. Kennedy Memorial Park in New Ross, County Wexford.

== May 30, 1968 (Thursday) ==
- France's Prime Minister, Georges Pompidou suggested that President Charles de Gaulle dissolve the National Assembly, call a new election, and then resign in the wake of the May 68 protests. President de Gaulle refused to resign, but called an election for June 23, and threatened to declare a state of emergency. Opposition parties agreed to the call for an election. French politician Charles Pasqua organized a counter-demonstration of support for President de Gaulle, with at least over 300,000 Gaullist supporters (and perhaps as many as one million) marching down the Champs-Élysées in Paris.
- West Germany enacted the controversial "Emergency Laws" (Notstandgesetze) a day after the third reading of the legislation, authorizing its government the power to revoke civil liberties during a national crisis.
- The 1968 Indianapolis 500 automobile race was run on this day, which was the Memorial Day holiday. Bobby Unser, driving a turbocharged Offenhauser-powered car, won the race with a record speed of 152.882 miles per hour and Dan Gurney finished second. By the time of the finish, all but 11 of the 33 cars had been put out of the race by mishaps.
- Born: Zacarias Moussaoui, French-born terrorist who received pilot training in 2001, but was arrested 26 days before he could become one of the participants in the September 11 attacks; in Saint-Jean-de-Luz, Pyrénées-Atlantiques département

== May 31, 1968 (Friday) ==
- Camille Chamoun, who had served as President of Lebanon from 1952 to 1958, was shot and wounded in an assassination attempt by a gunman who fired four bullets at point-blank range.
- The Queen's Birthday Honours for orders and decorations of the Commonwealth realms were announced in the London Gazette. Recipients included football manager Matt Busby and inventor Barnes Wallis (knighthoods), historian C. V. Wedgwood (DBE) and Stewart Maclennan, director of the National Art Gallery of New Zealand (OBE).
- Died: Preben Uglebjerg, 37, Danish film actor, was killed in an auto accident.Olsen, Jakob Steen (December 21, 2017). "Den populære stjernes dødsulykke er stadig en uløst gåde ("The popular star's fatal accident is still an unsolved mystery")". Berlingske Tidende. Berlingske Hus.
