= The White Ship (song) =

Single by H. P. Lovecraft

from the album H. P. Lovecraft
- B-side: "The White Ship" (edited version, original); "I've Been Wrong Before" (re-release)
- Released: November 1967
- Recorded: Mid-1967, Universal Recording Studios, Chicago, Illinois
- Genre: Psychedelic rock, baroque pop, folk rock
- Length: 6:33; 2:58 (edited version)
- Label: Philips
- Songwriter(s): George Edwards, Dave Michaels, Tony Cavallari
- Producer(s): George Badonsky

H. P. Lovecraft singles chronology
"Wayfaring Stranger" (1967)	"The White Ship" (1967)	"Keeper of the Keys" (1968)

"The White Ship" is a song released by the American psychedelic rock band, H. P. Lovecraft, in November 1967. The songwriting is credited to band members George Edwards, Dave Michaels, and Tony Cavallari. Acting as the opening song on the second side of their debut LP, H. P. Lovecraft, it was the album's longest track, and an edited version was also released as the band's second single. The name and theme of the song derive directly from author H. P. Lovecraft's short story, "The White Ship". Despite its failure to chart nationally, it is widely considered to be H. P. Lovecraft's most accomplished piece, and helped establish the group, who were originally from Chicago, in the West Coast music scene.

== Background ==
In 1967, H. P. Lovecraft spent much of their pre-recording time rehearsing intensively for several hours at a time. After a few months processing through personnel changes and rehearsal sessions, the band had both a relatively solidified line-up and personalized sound. With assistance from the band members, George Edwards, a creative force within the band, developed the haunting ambiance, and vocal harmonies featuring himself and Dave Michaels, almost total juxtapositions of one another, that made the band synonymous with the psychedelic music scene. Michaels, a classically-trained musician, was a standout for his four-octave span which blended in harmonies reminiscent of Jefferson Airplane. The band finally commenced a tour within the Chicago area and, following the replacement of rhythm guitarist Tom Skidmore with Jerry McGeorge, furthered their development of what would become future tracks recorded in studio sessions.

=== Recording ===
In mid-1967, weeks after recruiting McGeorge, the band started recording at Universal Recording Studios in Chicago under the production of George Badonsky. "The White Ship" was composed by Edwards in between intermissions of recording, in a matter of just 15 minutes. Although the initial concept of the song and its melody were devised by Edwards, contributions were made by other band members and Edwards allowed joint writing credits to co-singer Michaels and guitarist Cavallari as a part of his idea of "communal sharing of the creative collaboration." Michaels said that the initial version given to the band by Edwards and Badonsky was "instantly moulded into a new entity" by the band as a whole: "By itself, the baritone melody and chords are merely a bare-bones beginning. Adding the harmonies, the feedback effects on lead guitar, and conceiving the 'bolero' rhythm all came into being in a group setting...". Dunwich production company executive Bill Traut played a role in the song's recording, contributing the chiming of an 1811 ship's bell heard at the opening of the composition to add a perceived ghost-like experience. Recording of the track required more time than some of the group's other tracks, but, thanks to past rehearsals and the band's familiarity with the studio, the song was quickly produced, virtually live, on four-track.

The song has been described as baroque in nature, for its harpsichord passages and droning feedback. "The White Ship" draws comparisons to that of the author H. P. Lovecraft's short story while retaining the psychedelic influences of the late 1960s. The band's musical version focuses on the wonderment of the journey of the white ship, and ignores the horrific conclusion experienced by the story's character, Basil Elton. A scholar of Lovecraft's writings and heritage, Gary Hill, describes the song as having "... a weird ambient tone that calls to mind both some of the descriptions of sonic oddness that Lovecraft himself described and also the psychedelic chemical influence so common to this musical genre. As it moves forward the cut begins to take on a slow moving, ballad like structure... The cut moves off into weird spacey jamming later that includes sounds that seem to convey an Eastern mystic tone, which would be somewhat in keeping with much of Lovecraft's writing..."

== Release ==
In November 1967, "The White Ship" was released in the U.S. on the Philips label (catalog number, 40506). The song was already a favorite among the H.P. Lovecraft followers, which made its distribution a practical maneuver by the group. Initially, the single featured both an edited version of the song that was only two minutes and 58 seconds in length, and the complete version that extended to six and a half minutes. The original pressing was withdrawn, and in February 1968 a second single, featuring the completed version and "I've Been Wrong Before" as the B-side, was released in both the US and UK. The single failed to chart nationally; nevertheless, the song was solidified as a favorite on the underground circuit. The track also appeared on the album, H. P. Lovecraft, and the edited version was included on the 2005 compilation album, Dreams in the Witch House: The Complete Philips Recordings.

=== Pressings ===
- "The White Ship" (complete) b/w "The White Ship" (edited) - Philips #40506, 1967 US
- "The White Ship" (complete) b/w "I've Been Wrong Before" - Philips #BF 1639, 1968 US, UK
