= The White Ship =

The White Ship may refer to:

- The White Ship, a vessel which sank in the English Channel in 1120, drowning William Adelin, the only legitimate son of King Henry I of England
- The White Ship (Aitmatov novel), a 1970 novel by Chingiz Aitmatov
- The White Ship (French novel), a 2002 novel by Jackie French
- The White Ship (Payne novel), a 1975 novel by Donald G. Payne
- "The White Ship" (story), a 1919 short story by H. P. Lovecraft
- The White Ship, a 1924 book by Aino Kallas
- The White Ship (1941 film), an Italian war film directed by Roberto Rossellini
- The White Ship (1976 film), a Soviet film
- The white ship that took Frodo and other key characters on the final journey in J. R. R. Tolkien's The Lord of the Rings; see Elf (Middle-earth) § Fourth Age
- "The White Ship" (song), a composition by the psychedelic rock band, H. P. Lovecraft
- The white ship (Estonian: valge laev), a legendary ship in Estonian folklore associated with-19th century prophet Maltsvet (Juhan Leinberg)
