= Live May 11, 1968 =

Live album by H. P. Lovecraft
- Released: 1991
- Recorded: May 11, 1968, The Fillmore, San Francisco, CA
- Genre: Psychedelic rock
- Length: 45:35
- Label: Sundazed, Edsel
- Producer: Bob Irwin

H. P. Lovecraft chronology
H. P. Lovecraft II (1968)	Live May 11, 1968 (1991)

Live May 11, 1968 is a live album by the American psychedelic rock band H. P. Lovecraft and was released in 1991. The eight tracks included on the album were all recorded at The Fillmore in San Francisco, California, on May 11, 1968, soon after the band's original bass player Jerry McGeorge had been replaced by Jeffrey Boyan. The album consists of material taken from the band's first two studio albums and features very good sound quality considering the era in which it was recorded.

The original release of the album on Sundazed Music (Edsel Records in Europe) went out of print in the late 1990s, but it was reissued again by Sundazed in 2000. The album is also currently available as a digital download from iTunes.

== Track listing ==
1. "Wayfaring Stranger" (traditional, arranged by George Edwards) – 10:24
2. "The Drifter" (Tim Edmundson) – 8:24
3. "It's About Time" (Terry Callier) – 4:55
4. "The White Ship" (George Edwards, Dave Michaels, Tony Cavallari) – 7:02
5. "At the Mountains of Madness" (George Edwards, Dave Michaels, Tony Cavallari) – 4:33
6. "That's the Bag I'm In" (Fred Neil) – 3:35
7. "I've Been Wrong Before" (Randy Newman) – 2:54
8. "Country Boy & Bleeker Street" (Fred Neil) – 3:46

== Personnel ==
- George Edwards - vocals, guitar
- Dave Michaels - vocals, organ
- Jeffery Boyan - bass, vocals
- Tony Cavallari - lead guitar, vocals
- Michael Tegza - drums
