= Hominy (disambiguation) =

Hominy is dried mixed kernels, part of the Native American cuisine.

Hominy may also refer to:

- Hominy, Oklahoma, a city
  - Hominy Indians, a former professional football team from the above city
- Hominy Falls, West Virginia, an unincorporated community
- Hominy Hill Golf Course, a public golf course in Colts Neck, New Jersey
