= David Michaels =

David Michaels may refer to:

- David Michaels (author), a pseudonym for the authors of novels in the Splinter Cell, EndWar, H.A.W.X, and Ghost Recon series
- David Michaels (epidemiologist) (born 1954), American epidemiologist and OSHA official
- David Michaels (actor) (born 1964), English actor
- Dave Michaels (musician) (born 1944), co-founder of the 1960s acid rock band H. P. Lovecraft
