= Joe Pappio =

Native American football player

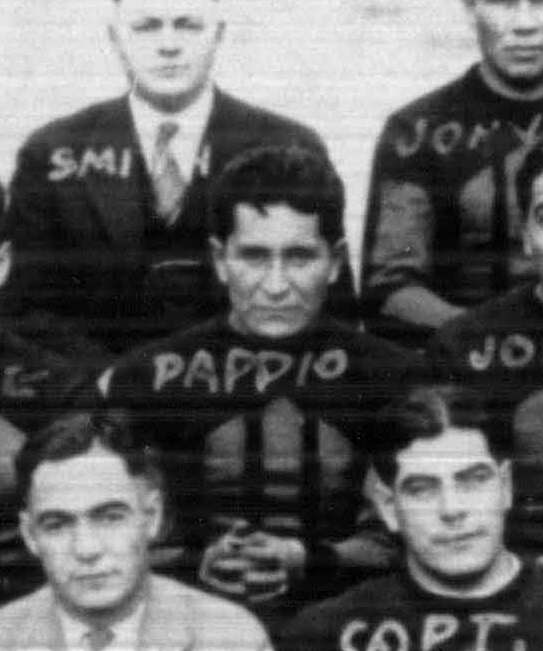
- Pappio on the 1926 Haskell Institute team

No. 33
- Position: End

Personal information
- Born: October 1, 1902; Sawyer, Minnesota, U.S.
- Died: August 22, 1971 (aged 68); Oklahoma City, Oklahoma, U.S.
- Listed height: 6 ft 0 in (1.83 m)
- Listed weight: 183 lb (83 kg)

Career information
- High school: Carlisle
- College: Haskell Institute

Career history
- Oorang Indians (NFL) (1923); Haskell Institute (NCAA) (1924–1926); Cincinnati Guard (1927-1928); Hominy Indians (1929); Chicago Cardinals (NFL) (1930); Oklahoma Indians (1931)
- Stats at Pro Football Reference

Joseph Aloysious Pappio (October 1, 1902 – August 22, 1971) was an American professional football player who played eight seasons, both in the National Football League (NFL) for the 1923 Oorang Indians and for 1930 Chicago Cardinals as well as independent teams the Cincinnati Guardsmen, Hominy Indians, and Oklahoma Indians.

A member of the Ojibwe (Chippewa) nation of Native Americans, Pappio attended and played college football at the Haskell Institute from 1924 through 1926, helping to see the latter team to an undefeated 12–0–1 record.

== Biography ==
=== Early life ===
Joe Pappio was born October 1, 1902, in Sawyer, Minnesota. His parents were both part of the Fond du Lac band of the Ojibwe (Chippewa) nation of Native Americans. He grew up on an reservation in Minnesota, where he began to emerge as a gifted athlete. He later recalled that

"In my youth I heard lots of stories about the greatest athlete of all time, Jim Thorpe.... Whenever I went hunting or just walking in the woods, I would grab something, tuck it under my arm, and make believe it was a football and the trees were opposing players."

Pappio as part of the undefeated 1926 Haskell Indians football team.

In the fall of 1916, seeking to emulate his hero, Pappio enrolled at the Carlisle Indian Industrial School in Carlisle, Pennsylvania. The United States entered World War I the following year, however, and the 15-year old Pappio lied about his age to voluntarily enlist in the United States Navy in June 1917. During the war he served aboard two gunboats — the USS Castine and the USS Nashville — before being honorably discharged after the end of the war in August 1919.

Pappio spent time living in Madison, Wisconsin, where he worked for a battery company, playing sports for the company teams. He tried his hand at professional baseball as an outfielder before being released in April 1922 by the Rockford Rox of the Class B Illinois–Indiana–Iowa League.

=== Football career ===
His hero Jim Thorpe was the player-coach of the Ohio-based Oorang Indians of the National Football League in 1923, a team composes solely of Native Americans, and needed an extra player at the end of the season. The 21-year old Pappio, who went to school with Thorpe's brother at Carlisle, was tapped by the famous halfback to fill a late-season hole in the Indians' roster. Pappio saw action in one league game in that season, a 19–0 victory over the Louisville Brecks, in which Pappio started at right end. It would be the club's final game played before the franchise folded and his only start in the NFL.

The fall of 1924 Pappio enrolled at Haskell Institute, a federally sponsored college for Native Americans, where he played for the school's highly regarded football team.

Joe Pappio in the 1928 uniform of the Cincinnati Guardsmen, a pro team sponsored by the Ohio National Guard.

The Haskell squad would become one of the most potent college teams in the country, opening the 1926 season with four consecutive shutout victories, quickly amassing 215 points in those initial games. The team would finish the season with an undefeated record of 12–0–1, including a 95-0 annihilation of Jackson College and one-sided victories over such major college foes such as Michigan State and Bucknell. For the year, the 1926 Haskell Indians squad would outscore its opponents 558 to 69 — an average score of 43–5 — with the only blemish coming in a 21–21 tie with Boston College.

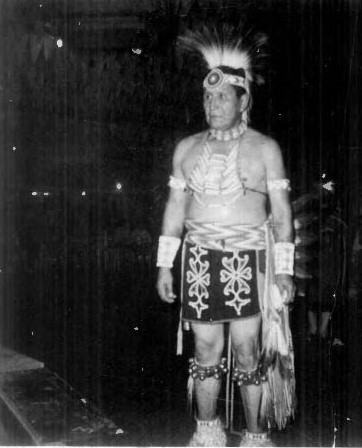
Joe Pappio, in native regalia. Pappio was a noted grass dancer, who performed publicly throughout his life.

In October 1927, Pappio again pursued his professional football ambitions by signing a contract to play end for the independent Ohio National Guard pro team, based in Cincinnati. In his first game with the club, Pappio found himself facing off against a Portsmouth, Ohio team featuring his former coach and idol, Jim Thorpe. The two Native American stars starting at left halfback in front of 5,100 fans, reckoned to be the largest crowd ever to see a football game in Cincinnati. Despite Thorpe's excellent day throwing the football, the hometown Guardsmen emerged victorious by a score of 19 to 12.

Pappio split his starts with Cincinnati in 1927 between the left half and right end positions, returning to the club in 1928 for another season playing professional football for "the soldiers".

He signed a contract to play football in 1929 for the Hominy Indians, an independent club based in Hominy, Oklahoma, that like the Oorang Indians was composed entirely of Native Americans.

In 1930, at the age of 28, Pappio returned to the NFL to play the 1930 season with the Chicago Cardinals. He saw action in four games as a reserve player. This stint in the NFL was brief, however, as in 1931 he signed to play with another independent team, the Oklahoma Indians, based in Tulsa.

The 1931 football season seems to have been Pappio's last pro football go-round, although not his last hurrah in athletics, as in the summer of 1932 he returned to the baseball diamond as the "walloping centerfielder" of a Eufaula, Oklahoma sandlot baseball team, taking the club to the Oklahoma state finals.

=== Life after football ===
Pappio worked for the Bureau of Indian Affairs and joined the merchant marine during World War II.

In 1946, Pappio moved to Oklahoma City. He made a career working as a maintenance engineer at Tinker Air Force Base in that city.

Pappio was a prominent grass dancer who performed in public numerous times throughout his life. Together with his wife, Nell, herself a member of the Kiowa nation, Pappio founded the Oklahoma City Pow Wow Club in 1950.

Pappio died October 22, 1971, in Oklahoma City at the age of 68. He was survived by his widow, two daughters, and a son.
