= Jerry McGeorge =

American musician (born 1945)

Jerry McGeorge (born October 22, 1945, in Cincinnati, Ohio, United States) came to prominence in late 1965 as an American guitarist with the Chicago rock band The Shadows of Knight. He later joined the psychedelic rock band H.P. Lovecraft on bass in the summer of 1967, appearing on their debut album, H. P. Lovecraft.

== Early life ==
McGeorge began playing guitar in 1961. His early guitar influences included Scotty Moore, James Burton, Chet Atkins, Charlie Byrd, Les Paul, and the Brazilian Bossa Nova artist, Laurindo Almeida. The folk music revival of the early 1960s was also influential, but, like many young Americans at the time he became most heavily influenced by the first Beatles-led British Invasion. Particular favorites at the time were The Rolling Stones and the original Byrds.

McGeorge was quoted in the 1980s: "My parents were adamantly against my listening to rock & roll at home, so, from the time I was about eleven years old I'd sneak a small transistor radio and an earpiece under my pillow at night. I'd tune in radio as diverse as the nearby Chicago Jazz & R&B stations to WSM in Nashville and the "Grand Ole Opry". I've always felt that the negative pressure from my parents made me even more determined to love this music. Their over-protective upbringing was a complete failure: Within five years I was not only a touring rock musician, I was helping throw TV sets out of hotel windows."

He found his initial footing playing high school dances with a small local band from Northwest Indiana, The Mystics. He subsequently played with the group, The Blackstones, with Jeff Boyan (aka Geoff Bryan). Boyan would later lead Chicago's Saturday's Children, and, in an odd twist of fate, replaced McGeorge on bass with H.P. Lovecraft in Spring 1968, appearing on their second album, H. P. Lovecraft II.

== Career ==
The Blackstones were a Beatles-influenced quartet who performed and recorded many original compositions penned by Boyan, with McGeorge as collaborator. The Blackstones performed with a number of high-profile rock acts during 1965, including The Byrds, The Beau Brummels and Herman's Hermits. The band developed a following and, as a result, was invited to play at The Cellar, a teen dance club in Arlington Heights, Illinois, home of house band The Shadows of Knight. The Blackstones disintegrated in Fall 1965 after two members, bassist Tom Osborne and drummer David Blanchard, were drafted into the US Army.

Attempts to replace them were unsuccessful and McGeorge became interested in the sudden opening in the Shadows of Knight created by the loss of rhythm guitarist, Norm Gotsch, who was also drafted into the U.S. military. The Shadows of Knight's Joe Kelley gauged McGeorge's interest in joining the band and he made the difficult decision to part company with friend Boyan to accept The Shadows' offer. McGeorge's influence on the Shadows of Knight, and theirs upon him, were enormous. His high energy level, showmanship and inventive secondary role play behind the often brilliant guitar work of Joe Kelley, intertwined with drummer Tom Shiffour's riffing, helped give the band its signature sound. McGeorge's insistence the band not stray from its unique sound resulted in the ground-breaking live studio recording techniques employed in production of the band's late 1966 classic "I'm Gonna Make You Mine".

As the Shadows of Knight's short-lived run through 1966 and mid-1967 came to an end, McGeorge accepted an invitation from H.P. Lovecraft's leader, George Edwards (aka Ethan Kenning), to join the band on bass.

After a short time, however, McGeorge confided to friends that the role proved not to be to his liking, and that he and the band were not a good fit. Financial pressures mounted due to the band's poor earning power, and he became increasingly at odds with Edwards, who in early 1968, along with the band's manager, the eccentric former Dunwich Records co-founder George Badonski, decided to replace him with Boyan. In January 1968 friend David "Hawk" Wolinski confided that H.P. Lovecraft had been auditioning bass players. McGeorge confronted the band, who denied the rumors. He immediately made plans to resign and remain in Chicago, rather than undertake the band's planned relocation to Marin County, California. However, these arrangements came undone and he was forced to agree to the ill-considered move. He would state in an April 1968 interview with the Chicago Tribune that he had only agreed to the California move because he had no other means of making a living.

It soon became apparent that he had been retained short-term simply to ensure the band could fulfill numerous California contractual obligations, among them a notable March 1968 appearance at the Fillmore Auditorium with Traffic. Ironically, recordings of those performances reveal McGeorge the artist at his absolute best.

His firing was very callously handled. McGeorge, feeling deceived and humiliated by this experience, suffered a crisis of confidence, becoming what he later described as "seriously withdrawn." He returned home to his native Indiana and began a long period of rehabilitation, which included a rigorous daily regimen of guitar study. Inspired by the talents of classically trained David Miotke of H.P. Lovecraft, for several years he stepped away from the popular music scene to turn to the formal study of music and the guitar. In 1969, he studied jazz guitar at Boston's Berklee School of Music. In 1972, with his guitar skills well honed, he moved to the Southwest and began playing country music full-time, long a personal favorite genre. In 1978, he finished his formal music education, graduating with honors from the prestigious jazz program at the University of North Texas.

McGeorge's broad range of studies made him equally at home with rock, country, electric blues, jazz & classical guitar. As a result, he became a highly sought-after session musician. Throughout the 1970s, he performed on numerous radio & television commercials, as well as performing and recording with a series of prominent country artists, including Waylon Jennings, Lawanda Lindsey, Johnny Bush, and Bucky Allred.

== Later career ==
In the late 1970s, concerns over an accelerating hearing loss and disenchantment with the musician's lifestyle caused McGeorge to abandon his music career and enter the auto industry. He ultimately rose to executive positions with Volkswagen of America and Ford Motor Company's Jaguar Cars Division.

In 1999 he made a surprise appearance in Arlington Heights, Illinois, at a reunion of bands and fans of The Cellar teen dance club, at which the Blackstones, Shadows of Knight and H.P. Lovecraft had performed in the 1960s. Teamed up again with original Shadows of Knight bandmate, Joe Kelley, the pair stole the show with a set of improvised electric blues. McGeorge's latter day guitar work can be found on the obscure Steve Vallence & The Dividers CD of the same year. McGeorge retired in 2000 to rural Southwest Colorado.
