= Lovecraft Country (disambiguation) =

Lovecraft Country is a term coined by Keith Herber for the New England setting of the weird tales of H.P. Lovecraft and others.

Lovecraft Country may also refer to:

- Lovecraft Country (novel), a 2016 novel by Matt Ruff
  - Lovecraft Country (TV series), an American television series based on Ruff's novel
