= The White Ship (story) =

1919 short story by H. P. Lovecraft

- Short story by H.P. Lovecraft
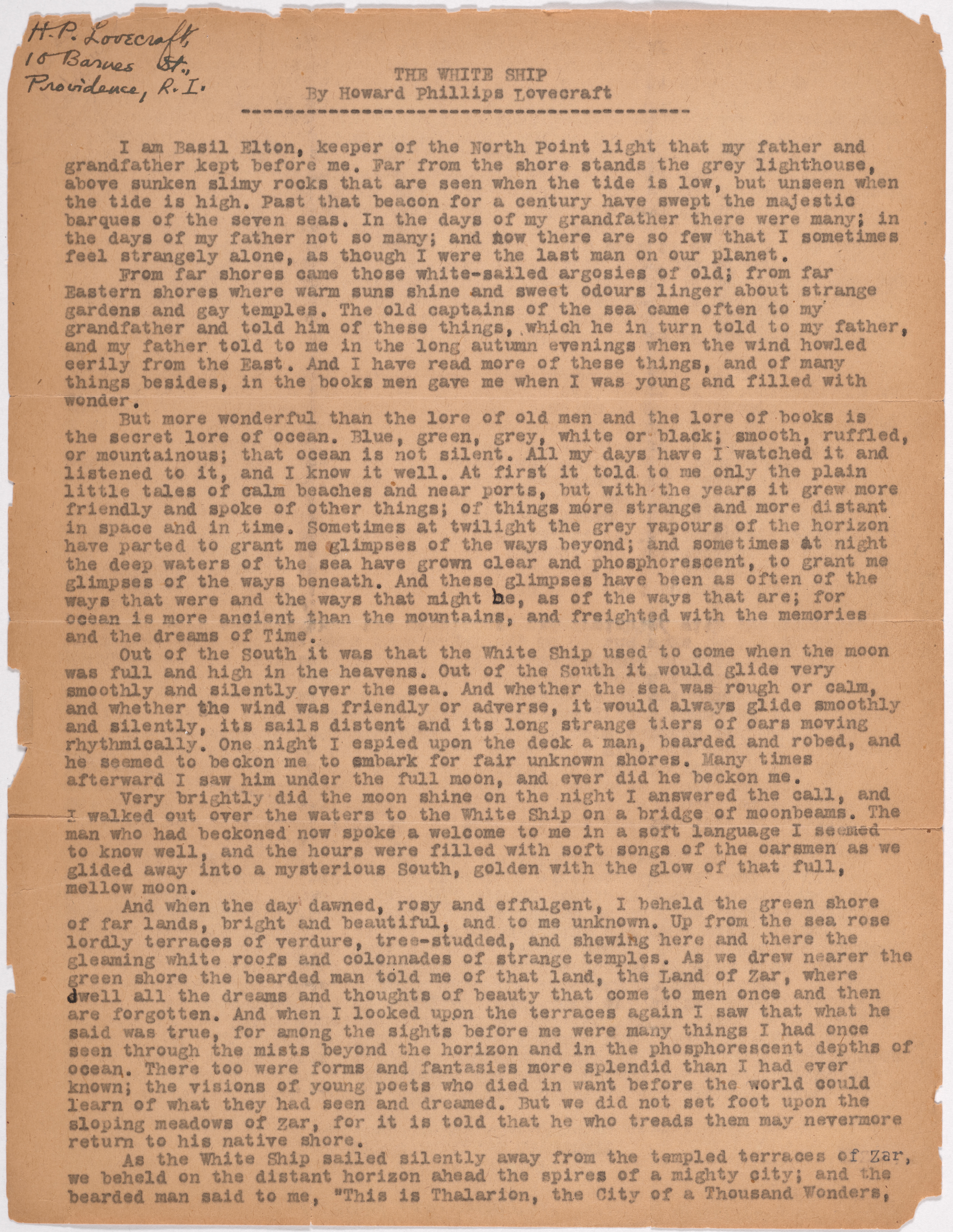
- The White Ship

Text available at Wikisource
- Country: United States
- Language: English
- Genre: Horror

Publication
- Published in: The United Amateur
- Media type: Print
- Publication date: November 1919

"The White Ship" is a horror short story by American writer H. P. Lovecraft. It was first published in The United Amateur (Volume 19) #2, November 1919, and later appeared in the March 1927 issue of Weird Tales.

== Plot ==
Basil Elton, a lighthouse keeper, engages in a peculiar fantasy in which a bearded man in robes is piloting a mystical white ship which appears when the moon is full. Elton walks across the water on a bridge of moonbeams, joins the bearded man on the ship, and together they explore a mystical chain of islands unlike anything that can be found on Earth.

They travel past Zar, a green land where "dwell all the dreams and thoughts of beauty that come to men once and then are forgotten", then the majestic city of Thalarion, "City of a Thousand Wonders", where frightful demons dwell. They pass Akariel, the huge carven gate of Thalarion, and continue their voyage. Elton is informed that those who enter both places have never returned. During the voyage, they seem to be following an azure celestial bird. They also pass Xura, the "Land of Pleasures Unattained", which seems pleasant from a distance but reeks of plague upon getting nearer. They finally settle in Sona-Nyl, the "Land of Fancy", where Elton spends a period of time which he describes as "many aeons", living in what seems to be a perfect society. During his time in Sona-Nyl, he learns of Cathuria, the "Land of Hope". Though no man truly knows where Cathuria is or what lies there, Elton is thrilled with the idea, fantasizing about it wildly, and urges the bearded man to take him there, which the man reluctantly agrees to do. They follow the celestial bird westward. After a perilous journey to where the crew believes Cathuria to be, the ship instead finds itself at the edge of the world, and plummets to its doom.

Elton awakens to find himself on the wet rocks next to his lighthouse, mere moments after he first departed on the white ship – and just in time to witness a catastrophic shipwreck caused by the light having gone out for the first time. He is further shaken by his later finding a dead azure bird and a spar of pure white. He never sees the white ship again.

== Connections ==
The surface plot is modeled on Lord Dunsany's 1910 story "Idle Days on the Yann".

Unlike many of Lovecraft's other tales, "The White Ship" does not directly tie into the popularized Cthulhu Mythos. However, the story cannot be entirely excluded from mythos continuity either, since it makes reference to preternatural, godlike beings. The tone and temperament of "The White Ship" speaks largely of the Dream Cycle literary structure that Lovecraft utilized in other stories such as The Dream-Quest of Unknown Kadath (1926) and "The Cats of Ulthar" (1920).

== Reception ==
Henry S. Whitehead, in a letter to The Eyrie, the letters page for Weird Tales, in May 1927, lauded The White Ship.

== Adaptations ==
- Basil Elton is a prominent character in Lovecraftian: The Shipwright Circle by Steven Philip Jones. The Lovecraftian series reimagines the weird tales of H. P. Lovecraft into one single universe modern epic, and Elton is the proprietor of The White Ship Tavern in Arkham, Massachusetts.
- The anthology comic magazine Anything Goes!, issue 4, features a comic adaption of the story by Alec Stevens, written in 1985/86.
- The story was also adapted into a song by the 1960s psychedelic rock band H. P. Lovecraft on their self-titled debut album.
- Doom metal band Solitude Aeturnus wrote and played a song on their debut album, Into the Depths of Sorrow, titled “White Ship.”
