= Hominy Indians =

Professional American football team

The Hominy Indians were a professional American football team founded and financed by Otto and Ira Hamilton in Hominy, Oklahoma during the 1920s and 1930s. Native American players represented twenty-two different tribes. They played regionally and traveled across the country. In 1925, they were named State Champions. Their last season was 1936.

A docu-drama about the team titled Playground of The Native Son went into production in the winter of 2012 in Oklahoma and was released in 2013. Celia Xavier, owner of Fully Funded Films, was executive producer and co-directed with Michael P Nash. Adam Beach starred in and narrated the film. A subsequent feature film is in pre-production currently based on the Hominy Indians Football team.

== Founding ==
In the early 1870s, one band of the Osage Tribe led by Blackdog were relocated by the U.S. Government from a reserve in northern Kansas to what is now Hominy, Oklahoma. This band of Osages became one of the five settlements of the Osage Nation. Hominy was located near a creek and was inhabited by extremely large natives, the majority of them taller than six foot and over 200 pounds. The Hominy Indians were established in 1923 playing teams formed by American Legions of neighboring cities in Kansas and Oklahoma. They proved successful quickly but were always short on finances. In 1925, they were bankrolled by Dick Rusk, Harry Bigeagle, Allison Webb, and Ed LaBelle providing them with uniforms and travel expenses.

== The team ==
Ira Hamilton was the leader of the football team, which was founded by a group of Osage men. According to “Hominy Indians,” the team was “all-Indian”, but was composed of teammates from many different tribes. They accomplished a 28-game winning streak during their time of play, which was ended by the Great Depression in 1932. According to Osage News, the team was made of people from 14 different tribes but was mainly made up of players from the Haskell Institute, a famous Indian school. The Majority of the players were from the Osage tribe, because the base of the team was in Hominy, Oklahoma.

== History, rivalries and betting ==
Arthur Shoemaker stated, "In the early years of the Hominy Indians team they played games against regional teams such as Coffeyville, Elk city, and Fredonia in Kansas; Avant, Bartlesville and Fairfax in Oklahoma, and Sarcoxie and Joplin in Missouri."

The Indians also had a significant rivalry against another nearby Osage Football team located within the Osage Reservation in Fairfax. Like other members of the Osage Nation the Osages who lived in the settlement of Fairfax were wealthy due to oil revenue produced on Osage land. They loved the game of football and their wealth gave them the needed resources to start a "team". Fairfax recruited players from the National Football League in an attempt to win large bets. In retaliation, the Hominy Indians recruited John Levi, a strong player from the Haskell Fighting Indians. Fairfax escalated by recruiting the entire Kansas City Cowboys for an off-the-books showdown game which kept secret from NFL officials. Hominy won the secret game, and $500,000 of winning bets placed against Fairfax were used to build Haskell Memorial Stadium. Two months later, the Osage held an honor dance for John Levi.

The Hominy Indians quickly rose to fame as they defeated other teams throughout the country. The Indians had never been defeated or even tied with another team as they entered into the biggest game of their existence against the champions of the National Football League, the New York Giants. One day after Christmas in 1927, the Giants traveled to Pawhuska, Oklahoma to face the dominating Indians. The Hominy Indians defeated the Giants by a score of 13–6 in front of what was said to be about 2,000 fans.

== Finances ==
At the start of the teams’ career in 1923, the Indians were very successful. The only drawback the team faced was the lack of resources for traveling and equipment. This financial burden was short lived when in 1925, the team received sponsorship from four Hominy Osage members. Dick Rusk, Harry Bigeagle, Allison Webb, and Ed LaBelle gave much needed financial support that provided the team with uniform and travel expenses.

The salary for a Hominy Indian player rarely ever rose above $150 per game and there are many instances when it dropped below that average. At times, all proceeds from the games would go to ensure that the players were compensated.

== Players ==
Hamilton, the founder of the Indians, resigned from his duties in order to take on the role of playing left guard for the team. Pete Big Horse, who towered over other players, played right guard for the team. Otto Hamilton, Ira's brother, played the center position. Bill Shadlow played a pivotal role on the front line. Legends say that the Hominy Indians team was made up of all-stars. One player, John Levi, was said to be able to drop kick the football, which is more round and heavier than today's standard football, through the goalposts from the 50 yard line. It is also said that he could make a 100-yard pass. Johnnie "Pepper" Martin proceeded to play baseball with the St. Louis Cardinals after his time with the Indians. Voted one of the best players in American history, Jim Thorpe was rumored to have played on the team for a couple of years. According to a magazine article titled “They might be the giants”, this rumor has proven to be false; he in fact never actually played for the Indians. Jim Thorpe did coach his own team called the Oorang Indians. Joe Pappio played for Thorpe's Oorang Indians for a short stint and then moved back to Hominy to play for the Indians. There are film records of Pappio hitting linemen so hard their helmets would fly off of their heads, allowing the teams’ running back to make huge gains.

== Advertisement ==
The Great Depression struck in the 1930s and posed a need for more creative advertising of the games. When the Hominy team had a game far away they would dress in their traditional dancing clothes and have a "pow-wow" dance to promote the game. They could always get a big crowd with their drums, feathers, chants, and whoops.
