= H. P. Lovecraft (album) =

Studio album by H. P. Lovecraft
- Released: October 1967
- Recorded: Mid-1967
- Studios: Universal Recording Studios, Chicago, IL
- Genres: Psychedelic rock, folk rock
- Length: 32:10
- Label: Philips
- Producer: George Badonsky

H. P. Lovecraft chronology
H. P. Lovecraft (1967)	H. P. Lovecraft II (1968)

Singles from H. P. Lovecraft
- 1. "Wayfaring Stranger" Released: September 1967; 2. "The White Ship" Released: November 1967

Professional ratings
Review scores
Source	Rating
AllMusic	4.5/5 stars

H. P. Lovecraft is the debut album by the American psychedelic rock band H. P. Lovecraft. It was released in October 1967 by Philips Records.

== Background ==
The album blended psychedelic and folk rock influences and was marked by the haunting, eerie ambiance of the band's music, which itself was often inspired by the literary works of horror writer H. P. Lovecraft, after whom the band had named themselves. Although most of the album comprises interpretations of traditional and contemporary folk songs, it also features the self-penned compositions "That's How Much I Love You, Baby (More or Less)", "The Time Machine", and arguably the band's best known song, "The White Ship". The traditional song "Wayfaring Stranger" was released as a single just ahead of the album in September 1967 and "The White Ship" was issued shortly after the album appeared, although neither single reached the charts. Like its attendant singles, H. P. Lovecraft was also somewhat commercially unsuccessful and failed to reach the Billboard Top LPs chart or the UK Albums Chart, although it did sell reasonably well over time.

== Recording and contents ==
Recording sessions for the album took place in mid-1967 at Universal Recording in Chicago, with the band's manager George Badonsky Record producer and Jerry DeClerk engineering. Progress on the album was very rapid, with the band recording many of the songs virtually live in the studio, although horns, woodwind instruments, and a nine-piece orchestra were overdubbed onto the tracks after completion of the initial sessions. The album is highlighted by the vaguely sinister ambiance of the band's music and by the oddly striking harmonies that resulted from the juxtaposition of guitarist and ex-folk singer George Edwards' folk-influenced singing and keyboardist Dave Michaels' classically trained, operatic phrasing.

The ten songs included on H. P. Lovecraft exhibit a wide range of styles, encompassing elements of jazz on "That's How Much I Love You, Baby (More or Less)", folk music on "Wayfaring Stranger", Gregorian chant on "Gloria Patria", vaudeville psychedelia on "The Time Machine", and contemporary singer-songwriter material on "The Drifter", "Let's Get Together", "That's The Bag I'm In", and "Country Boy & Bleeker Street". In addition, the laid-back, druggy ambiance of the cover of Randy Newman's "I've Been Wrong Before" serves to give an indication of the musical direction that the band would follow on their second album, H. P. Lovecraft II.

The album's centerpiece is the song "The White Ship", which was directly inspired by author H. P. Lovecraft's short story "The White Ship". Written by Edwards, Michaels, and the band's lead guitarist Tony Cavallari, the six-and-a-half-minute opus made use of baroque-style harpsichord, droning feedback, somber harmonies, and the chiming of an 1811 ship's bell. The song was released in an edited form as a single, shortly after its appearance on the album, but it failed to reach the Billboard Hot 100. In addition, the full-length album version of "The White Ship" went on to become something of an underground FM radio favorite in America.

== Re-releases ==
Although the H. P. Lovecraft album was largely overlooked at the time of its release and had gone out of print by the early 1970s, its reputation has continued to grow over the years. A revival in interest in the band and their music began in the late 1980s, with Edsel Records reissuing the album and its follow-up together on the At the Mountains of Madness compilation in 1988. In 1997 both albums were re-released by Britonic Records as 'This is HP Lovecraft / HP Lovecraft II'. The album was again reissued in 2000, along with its follow-up H. P. Lovecraft II, on the Collectors' Choice Music CD Two Classic Albums from H. P. Lovecraft: H. P. Lovecraft/H. P. Lovecraft II. In addition, all ten songs that make up the H. P. Lovecraft album were included on the Rev-Ola Records compilation Dreams in the Witch House: The Complete Philips Recordings.

== Track listing ==
=== Side 1 ===
1. "Wayfaring Stranger" (traditional, arranged by George Edwards) – 2:35
2. "Let's Get Together" (Chet Powers) – 4:35
3. "I've Been Wrong Before" (Randy Newman) – 2:46
4. "The Drifter" (Travis Edmonson) – 4:11
5. "That's The Bag I'm In" (Fred Neil) – 1:46

=== Side 2 ===
1. "The White Ship" (George Edwards, Dave Michaels, Tony Cavallari) – 6:33
2. "Country Boy & Bleeker Street" (Fred Neil) – 2:35
3. "The Time Machine" (George Edwards, Dave Michaels) – 2:05
4. "That's How Much I Love You, Baby (More or Less)" (George Edwards, Dave Michaels, Tony Cavallari) – 3:55
5. "Gloria Patria" (traditional, arranged by George Edwards, Dave Michaels) – 0:27

== Personnel ==
=== H. P. Lovecraft ===
- George Edwards – vocals, acoustic guitar, electric guitar, guitarrón, bass
- Dave Michaels – vocals, organ, piano, harpsichord, clarinet, recorder
- Jerry McGeorge – bass, vocals
- Tony Cavallari – lead guitar, vocals
- Michael Tegza – drums, percussion, timpani, vocals

=== Additional musicians ===
- Bill Traut – bells, percussion
- Len Druss – piccolo flute, English horn, saxophones
- Jack Henningbaum, Paul Tervelt – French horn
- Bill Traub – reeds
- Herb Weiss, Ralph Craig – trombone
- Clyde Bachand – tuba
- Eddie Higgins – vibraphone, horn arrangements

=== Technical ===
- George Badonsky – record producer
- Jerry DeClerk – engineer
- John Cabalka – design
- Mike Stone – photography
