= H. P. Lovecraft II =

Studio album by H. P. Lovecraft
- Released: September 1968
- Recorded: June – July 1968
- Studio: I.D. Sound Studios, Los Angeles, CA
- Genre: Psychedelic rock, folk rock
- Length: 33:21
- Label: Philips
- Producer: George Badonsky

H. P. Lovecraft chronology
H. P. Lovecraft (1967)	H. P. Lovecraft II (1968)	Live May 11, 1968 (1991)

Singles from H. P. Lovecraft II
- 1. "Keeper of the Keys" Released: November 1968

H. P. Lovecraft II is the second album by the American psychedelic rock band H. P. Lovecraft and was released in September 1968 on Philips Records. As with their debut LP, the album saw the band blending psychedelic and folk rock influences, albeit with a greater emphasis on psychedelia than on their first album. H. P. Lovecraft II failed to sell in sufficient quantities to reach the Billboard Top LPs chart or the UK Albums Chart, despite the band being a popular act on the U.S. psychedelic concert circuit. Legend has it that the album was the first major label release to have been recorded by musicians who were all under the influence of LSD.

== Background ==
Recording sessions for the album began in June 1968 at I.D. Sound Studios in Los Angeles, with the band's manager George Badonsky producing and British-born Chris Huston serving as audio engineer. H. P. Lovecraft had toured intensively during the first half of 1968 and consequently, there was a lack of properly arranged new material for the album. As a result, much of H. P. Lovecraft II was improvised in the studio, with Huston playing a pivotal role in enabling the underprepared band to complete the recording sessions.

Huston was also instrumental in creating the psychedelic sound effects that adorned much of the album's contents. The band's singer and guitarist, George Edwards, recalled the importance of Huston's contributions during an interview with journalist Nick Warburton: "Chris came up with a lot of very innovative techniques that prior to that record had not really been used. He was way ahead of his time. We had no material, the band was totally fried and Chris helped us make a record. That record would never have happened without Chris."

Among the tracks that were recorded for the album were the Edwards-penned compositions "Electrollentando" and "Mobius Trip", the latter of which featured lyrics that music historian Richie Unterberger has described as "disoriented hippie euphoria." In addition, the band elected to cover "Spin, Spin, Spin" and "It's About Time", which had both been performed by Terry Callier, an old friend of Edwards' from his days as a folk singer. Unterberger has remarked that both of these songs made effective use of the oddly striking vocal interplay and close harmony singing of Edwards and the band's keyboardist Dave Michaels.

The band's newest recruit, Jeff Boyan, who had only joined the group in early 1968 as a replacement for bassist Jerry McGeorge, was featured as lead vocalist on his own composition "Blue Jack of Diamonds" and on the band's cover of the folk standard "High Flying Bird". The track "Nothing's Boy" featured a contribution from voice artist Ken Nordine, and the cover version of Brewer & Shipley's "Keeper of the Keys" was issued as a single in late 1968, following its appearance on the album, but it failed to reach the charts.

The self-penned "At the Mountains of Madness" was based on the 1931 novella At the Mountains of Madness by horror writer H. P. Lovecraft, after whom the band had named themselves. Written by Edwards, Michaels and lead guitarist Tony Cavallari, the song featured some chaotically acrobatic vocal interplay and made ample use of swirling, echoed reverse tape effects, which served to highlight the song's sinister subject matter.

== Release and legacy ==
H. P. Lovecraft II was released in September 1968. Critic Richie Unterberger has remarked that, despite being less focused than the band's first album, it nonetheless managed to successfully expand on the musical approach of its predecessor. He also opined that it shared the haunting, eerie ambiance of the band's first album. Writing for the Allmusic website, Unterberger has described the album as, "much more progressive than their first effort", although he also noted that it "showed the band losing touch with some of their most obvious strengths, most notably their disciplined arrangements and incisive songwriting."

Although H. P. Lovecraft II failed to chart at the time of its release and had gone out of print by the early 1970s, a revival of interest in the band's music had begun by the late 1980s. This resulted in the album being reissued by Edsel Records, along with the band's debut album, on the At the Mountains of Madness compilation in 1988.

The album was again reissued in 2000, along with H. P. Lovecraft, on the Collectors' Choice Music CD, Two Classic Albums from H. P. Lovecraft: H. P. Lovecraft/H. P. Lovecraft II. In addition, the nine songs that make up H. P. Lovecraft II were included on the Rev-Ola Records compilation Dreams in the Witch House: The Complete Philips Recordings.

== Track listing ==
=== Side 1 ===
1. "Spin, Spin, Spin" (Terry Callier) – 3:21
2. "It's About Time" (Terry Callier) – 5:17
3. "Blue Jack of Diamonds" (Jeff Boyan) – 3:08
4. "Electrallentando" (George Edwards) – 6:34

=== Side 2 ===
1. "At the Mountains of Madness" (George Edwards, Dave Michaels, Tony Cavallari) – 4:57
2. "Mobius Trip" (George Edwards) – 2:44
3. "High Flying Bird" (Billy Ed Wheeler) – 3:21
4. "Nothing's Boy" (Ken Nordine) – 0:39
5. "Keeper of the Keys" (Mike Brewer, Tom Shipley) – 3:05

== Personnel ==
=== Musicians ===
- George Edwards – vocals, acoustic guitar, electric guitar, bass
- Dave Michaels – vocals, keyboards, string arrangements
- Tony Cavallari – lead guitar, vocals
- Jeff Boyan – bass, vocals
- Michael Tegza – drums, percussion, vocals

=== Technical ===
- George Badonsky – producer
- Christopher Huston – engineer
- Bob Schnepf – design
- Tom Gundelfinger – photography
