= H. P. Lovecraft (band) =

1960s American psychedelic rock band

- H. P. Lovecraft; From left to right: Jerry McGeorge, Tony Cavallari, George Edwards, Dave Michaels, and Michael Tegza

Background information
- Origin: Chicago
- Genres: Psychedelic rock, folk rock, acid rock
- Years active: 1967–1969
- Labels: Philips
- Past members: George Edwards; Dave Michaels; Tony Cavallari; Michael Tegza; Tom Skidmore; Jerry McGeorge; Jeffrey Boyan

H. P. Lovecraft was an American psychedelic rock band, formed in Chicago in 1967. Named after the horror writer H. P. Lovecraft, much of the band's music was inspired by the author's works. Their music combined elements of psychedelia and folk rock.

The band was signed to Philips Records in 1967 and released their first single, "Anyway That You Want Me", in the early part of that year. Their first album, H. P. Lovecraft, followed in late 1967 and included their best-known song, "The White Ship". The band then relocated to San Francisco, where they became a frequent attraction at various Bay Area venues, including The Fillmore and the Winterland Ballroom. In 1968, a second album, H. P. Lovecraft II, appeared, but the group disbanded in early 1969.

Original members George Edwards and Michael Tegza subsequently formed a new line-up of the band with the shortened name of Lovecraft, although Edwards left this new group before their first album was recorded. The second incarnation of the band released the Valley of the Moon album in 1970 and, after a further name change to Love Craft, the We Love You Whoever You Are album in 1975.

== History ==
=== Formation and first album ===
The first version of H. P. Lovecraft was formed when ex-folk singer George Edwards, who was working as an in-house session vocalist for Dunwich Records at the time, entered the studio to record a cover version of Chip Taylor's "Anyway That You Want Me" (a song that had recently been a UK hit for the Troggs). Edwards had previously been a folk troubadour in Chicago, California, and Florida, and had released a commercially unsuccessful cover of the Beatles' "Norwegian Wood" on Dunwich in 1966. He had also recorded a cover version of Bob Dylan's "Quit Your Low Down Ways" for the label, but this remained unreleased until the early 1970s. For the "Anyway That You Want Me" session, Edwards was backed by members of the Chicago band the Rovin' Kind and was also joined by Dave Michaels, a classically trained singer and multi-instrumentalist with a four-octave voice, who Edwards had met while playing in a lounge jazz trio at a local Holiday Inn.

"Anyway That You Want Me" was coupled with "It's All Over for You", a George Edwards solo outtake from the previous year, and released as a single under the moniker of H. P. Lovecraft in early 1967 by the Mercury Records' subsidiary Philips. The decision to release the single as H. P. Lovecraft, rather than as a George Edwards solo release, was made by Dunwich founders Bill Traut and George Badonsky, who were both fans of the literary works of horror writer H. P. Lovecraft and had, in fact, named Dunwich Records after Lovecraft's short story "The Dunwich Horror". Edwards and Michaels were both enthusiastic about the band name, and after permission from Lovecraft's estate was secured, the duo set about recruiting other musicians to form a permanent line-up of the band.

Auditions were held in March 1967, which resulted in the recruitment of Tony Cavallari (lead guitar), Mike Tegza (drums), and Tom Skidmore (bass). Skidmore soon departed the band, however, and was replaced by Jerry McGeorge, who had previously been a guitarist for Chicago band the Shadows of Knight. McGeorge had seen H. P. Lovecraft perform a number of times at a Chicago dance club called The Cellar, and although he considered himself primarily a guitarist, he accepted Edwards's offer to join the group as their new bassist.

With Michaels and Edwards as the creative driving forces behind the group, H. P. Lovecraft began to develop a blend of folk rock and psychedelia, with a repertoire that encompassed contemporary and traditional folk songs and some self-penned material. The band's sound was highlighted by the oddly striking harmony work that resulted from the juxtaposition of Edwards's folk-influenced singing and Michaels's operatic vocal phrasing, a blend that was influenced by folk singer Fred Neil's work with Vince Martin. The band's music was made all the more unique by Michaels's virtuosity on organ, piano, harpsichord, clarinet, and recorder, which gave H. P. Lovecraft a much wider range of sounds and timbres than many of their contemporaries.

The White Ship
An excerpt from "The White Ship" highlighting the eerie ambiance present in H. P. Lovecraft's music and the unconventional sounding harmonies produced by ex-folk singer George Edwards and the classically trained Dave Michaels.

In late 1967, the band recorded and released their debut album for Philips, H. P. Lovecraft. A cover of the traditional song "Wayfaring Stranger" was issued just ahead of the album as a single in September 1967, but it failed to chart. The album itself was released some weeks later and although it also failed to reach the U.S. charts, it sold reasonably well over time.

Featuring a nine-piece orchestra and songs that exhibited a wide-ranging stylistic variety, H. P. Lovecraft was possessed of a haunting, eerie ambiance that lived up to the band's intention of making music inspired by H. P. Lovecraft's "macabre tales and poems of Earth populated by another race" (to quote the LP's back cover). While the album did include a smattering of self-penned material, including the jazzy "That's How Much I Love You, Baby (More or Less)" and the vaudeville psychedelia of "The Time Machine", the majority of H. P. Lovecraft consisted of cover versions. Among these covers were Dino Valente's hippie anthem "Get Together", Randy Newman's "I've Been Wrong Before", Travis Edmonson's "The Drifter", and the Fred Neil compositions "That's The Bag I'm In" and "Country Boy & Bleeker Street". The centerpiece of the album, however, was the Edwards—Michaels—Cavallari composition "The White Ship", which was based on author H. P. Lovecraft's short story "The White Ship". The six-and-a-half-minute opus, which featured baroque harpsichord passages, droning feedback, somber harmonies, and the chiming of a genuine 1811 ship's bell, has been described by music historian Richie Unterberger as having a "wavering, foggy beauty, with some of Michaels' eeriest keyboards." The song became something of an underground FM radio favorite and was also issued in an edited form as a single, although it failed to reach the Billboard Hot 100.

=== Relocation and second album ===
H. P. Lovecraft embarked on their first tour of the West Coast in late 1967, establishing themselves as a live favorite in San Francisco and Los Angeles. In November 1967, Billboard magazine reported that the H. P. Lovecraft album had become something of an underground hit in San Francisco and had already sold 1,100 copies there. In San Francisco the band were championed by concert promoter Bill Graham and this led to appearances at such high-profile venues as The Fillmore and the Winterland Ballroom.

After returning to Chicago briefly, the group embarked on an early 1968 East Coast tour, appearing at the Boston Tea Party, Philadelphia's Electric Factory, and concluding with an aborted engagement at New York's Cafe Au Go Go alongside Al Kooper's Blood, Sweat & Tears. These obligations fulfilled, the group relocated to Marin County, California, permanently in mid-February 1968 in an attempt to advance their careers. Notable post-relocation performances were at the Fillmore and Winterland with Traffic, Salt Lake City's Utah State Fairgrounds Coliseum with Buffalo Springfield and the Youngbloods, Los Angeles's Whisky a Go Go with Colors, and in Palm Springs, appearing with the James Cotton Blues Band.

Eight weeks after the group's relocation, bassist Jerry McGeorge made his final appearance with H. P. Lovecraft at the Los Angeles Kaleidoscope on April 12–14, 1968. He was replaced by Jeffrey Boyan, who had previously been a member of the Chicago band Saturday's Children. Critic Jeff Jarema has noted that Boyan was an accomplished bass player with a strong singing voice and that his addition to the band improved their abilities as a live act considerably. The band subsequently played West Coast concerts with the Grateful Dead, Jefferson Airplane, and Moby Grape, as well as with touring British bands such as Pink Floyd and The Who. The band's prowess and imagination as a live act during this period can be heard on the Live May 11, 1968 album. The live album, which, according to critic Ned Raggett, boasts "one of the best live recording qualities" for the period, was released in 1991 by Sundazed Music (Edsel Records in the UK) and was reissued in 2000.

In June 1968, H. P. Lovecraft decamped to I.D. Sound Studios in Los Angeles with engineer Chris Huston to record their second album. Due to the intensive touring that the band had undertaken during the first half of 1968, there was a lack of properly arranged new material and consequently much of the album was improvised in the studio. Huston was pivotal in enabling the underprepared band to complete the recording sessions and also created many of the album's psychedelic sound effects.

The album was released as H. P. Lovecraft II in September 1968, and, although it was less focused than its predecessor, it successfully expanded on the musical approach of the band's first album. Among its nine tracks, the album included "At the Mountains of Madness", another song based on the works of the author H. P. Lovecraft (this time his 1931 novella At the Mountains of Madness). The album also included a cover of Brewer & Shipley's "Keeper of the Keys", the Edwards-penned tracks "Electrollentando" and "Mobius Trip", a contribution from voice artist Ken Nordine on the track "Nothing's Boy", and two songs written by Edwards's friend Terry Callier: "Spin, Spin, Spin" and "It's About Time". Like the band's first album, H. P. Lovecraft II failed to sell in sufficient quantities to reach the U.S. charts.

Michaels left the band in late 1968, to return to university, and as a result, H. P. Lovecraft effectively collapsed in early 1969, with Tegza joining the band Bangor Flying Circus. A successor group, Lovecraft, was formed in 1969 and included Edwards and Tegza from the original line-up, although Edwards departed from the group soon after its formation. Edwards has subsequently undertaken production work and played in folk clubs under his real name, Ethan Kenning, occasionally reuniting with Michaels, who records and performs under his real name, David Miotke.

=== Lovecraft and Love Craft ===
Lovecraft / Love Craft
- Genres: Rock, funk
- Years active: 1969–1971, 1975–1976, 1980
- Labels: Reprise, Mercury
- Past members: Michael Tegza; George Edwards; Michael Been; Jim Donlinger; Marty Grebb; Lalomie Washburn; George Agosto; Craig Gigstad; Mark Justin; Jorge Juan Rodriguez; Frank Capek; Marc Scherer; Mark Gardner

After the breakup of H. P. Lovecraft, a spin-off band with the shortened name of Lovecraft was formed in late 1969 by George Edwards and Michael Tegza. The new band's line-up included two recruits from the Chicago band Aorta: guitarist Jim Donlinger and bassist Michael Been. Initially, it was hoped that Dave Michaels would also join the new incarnation of the band, but he withdrew and the group instead recruited keyboard player and singer Marty Grebb, previously of the Buckinghams. After securing a recording contract with Reprise Records, Edwards pulled out of the project and returned to performing as a solo folk singer.

The remaining band members completed recording sessions for an album titled Valley of the Moon, and promptly headed out on tour, supporting the Boz Scaggs Band and later Leon Russell. The Valley of the Moon album saw the group abandoning the eerie psychedelic ambiance that had characterized H. P. Lovecraft's music and instead featured a more laid-back, mainstream rock sound, somewhat reminiscent of Crosby, Stills & Nash or Uriah Heep. By the time that Valley of the Moon was released, Lovecraft had split up and the album, along with its attendant single "We Can Have It Altogether", failed commercially and did not chart.

Following the demise of the band, Tegza rejoined Edwards in the band Elixir, playing a handful of shows in 1971, but never releasing any recordings. Of the other ex-members of Lovecraft, Grebb went on to form the Fabulous Rhinestones and eventually developed a career as a solo artist and session musician; Been joined Jerry Miller and Bob Mosley (both ex-members of Moby Grape) in Fine Wine and recorded the self-titled Fine Wine album in 1976, as well as playing Bay Area clubs with Miller in a band called The Original Haze in the late 1970s, before going on to front the new wave band the Call during the 1980s and 1990s; and Donlinger recorded a number of solo albums and published an autobiography titled Space Traveller: A Musician's Odyssey.

In 1975, Tegza put together yet another variation of the group, this time a funk band with the name Love Craft, featuring vocalist Lalomie Washburn. Love Craft released the We Love You Whoever You Are album on Mercury Records in 1975, but the record sold poorly and, as a result, the band were dropped by their label and disbanded shortly thereafter. In 1980, Tegza and Love Craft guitarist Frankie Capek reunited to form a second version of the band, recruiting vocalist Marc Scherer and bassist Mark Gardner to complete the line-up. With a repertoire consisting of contemporary pop music and older psychedelic material, the band garnered some label interest, but broke up before they had secured a recording contract, due to Scherer leaving the band.

Since then, Tegza has become a pastor and as of December 2014 lives in Eureka Springs, Arkansas. Scherer is currently signed to Frontiers, Italy and records with Grammy winner Jim Peterik of "Eye of the Tiger" fame. The Peterik/Scherer (PS) album Risk Everything was set for release in spring of 2015.

Despite the involvement of Tegza and Edwards in Lovecraft and Love Craft, neither band is regarded as being fundamentally connected to H. P. Lovecraft or its history, beyond the obvious similarities in names and shared members.

== Literary references to the band ==
Science fiction writer Harry Turtledove makes frequent references to the band H.P. Lovecraft (sometimes only as "HPL") in numerous stories. In one short story, "The Fillmore Shoggoth," five historical members of HPL (including George Edwards as the viewpoint character) appear in a horror-adventure plot where Lovecraftian monsters attack the theater where they are performing.

== Members ==
H. P. Lovecraft

- George Edwards – vocals, acoustic guitar, electric guitar, guitarrón, bass (1967–1969)
- Dave Michaels – vocals, organ, piano, harpsichord, clarinet, recorder (1967–1968)
- Tony Cavallari – lead guitar, vocals (1967–1969)
- Michael Tegza – drums, percussion, timpani, vocals (1967–1969)
- Tom Skidmore – bass (1967)
- Jerry McGeorge – bass, vocals (1967–1968)
- Jeff Boyan – bass, vocals (1968–1969)

Lovecraft

- Michael Tegza – drums (1969–1971)
- Jim Donlinger – guitar (1969–1971)
- Michael Been – bass (1969–1971)
- Marty Grebb – keyboards, vocals (1969–1971)
- George Edwards – vocals, guitar (1969–1970)

Love Craft

- Michael Tegza – drums (1975–1976)
- Lalomie Washburn – vocals, percussion (1975)
- George Agosto – percussion (1975)
- Craig Gigstad – bass (1975)
- Mark Justin – synthesizer, keyboards (1975)
- Jorge Juan Rodriguez – guitar (1975)
- Frank Capek – guitar (1975–1976)
- Shawn Christopher – vocals (1976)
- Jeff Steele – bass (1976)
- Theodis Rodgers – keyboards (1976)

== Discography ==
=== Albums ===
- H. P. Lovecraft (1967)
- H. P. Lovecraft II (1968)
- Valley of the Moon [as Lovecraft] (1970)
- We Love You Whoever You Are [as Love Craft] (1975)
- Live May 11, 1968 [live recordings] (1991)

=== Compilations ===
- At the Mountains of Madness (1988)
- H. P. Lovecraft/H. P. Lovecraft II (1997)
- Two Classic Albums from H. P. Lovecraft: H. P. Lovecraft/H. P. Lovecraft II (2000)
- Dreams in the Witch House: The Complete Philips Recordings (2005)

=== Singles ===
- "Anyway That You Want Me"/"It's All Over for You" (Philips 40464) (1967)
- "Wayfaring Stranger"/"The Time Machine" (Philips 40491) (1967)
- "The White Ship" (Part 1)/"The White Ship" (Part 2) (Philips 40506) (1967)
- "The White Ship"/"I've Been Wrong Before" (Philips BF 1639) [UK release] (1968)
- "Keeper of the Keys"/"Blue Jack of Diamonds" (Philips 40578) (1968)
- "We Can Have It Altogether"/"Will I Know When My Time Comes?" (Reprise 0996) [as Lovecraft] (1971)
- "I Feel Better"/"Flight" (Mercury 73698) [as Love Craft] (1975)
- "Ain't Gettin' None"/"We Love You" (Mercury 73707) [as Love Craft] (1975)
