= Hominy Falls, West Virginia =

- Unincorporated community
- Location within West Virginia Location within the United States
- Coordinates: 38°08′43″N 80°43′07″W
- Country: United States
- State: West Virginia
- County: Nicholas
- Elevation: 2,346 ft (715 m)
- Time zone: UTC-5 (Eastern (EST))
  - Summer (DST): UTC-4 (EDT)
- Area codes: 304 & 681
- GNIS feature ID: 1551482

Hominy Falls is an unincorporated community in Nicholas County, West Virginia, United States. Hominy Falls is 6 miles (9.7 km) north of Quinwood. It is named after the falls on nearby Hominy Creek.

== Gallery ==
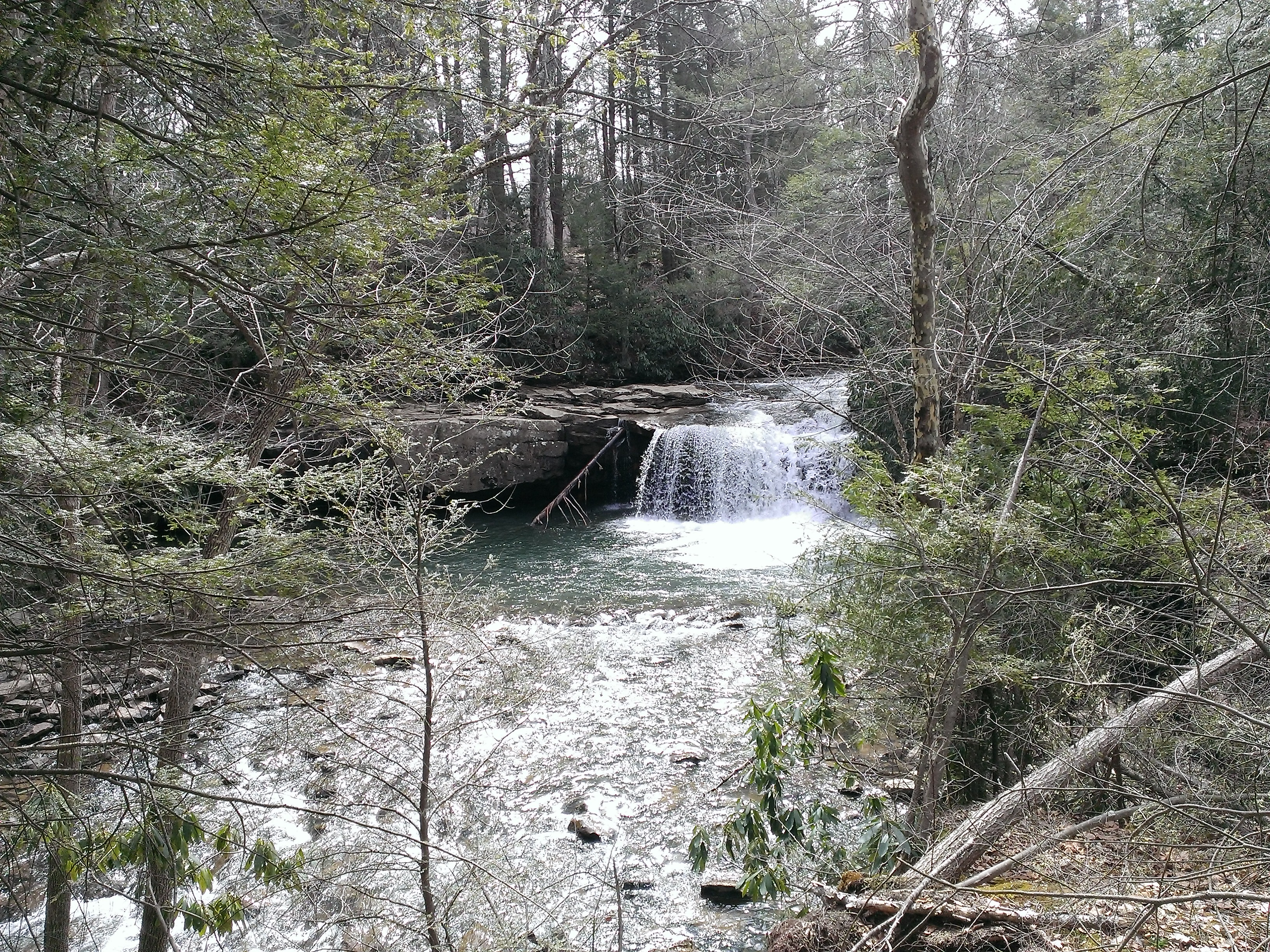
Hominy Falls

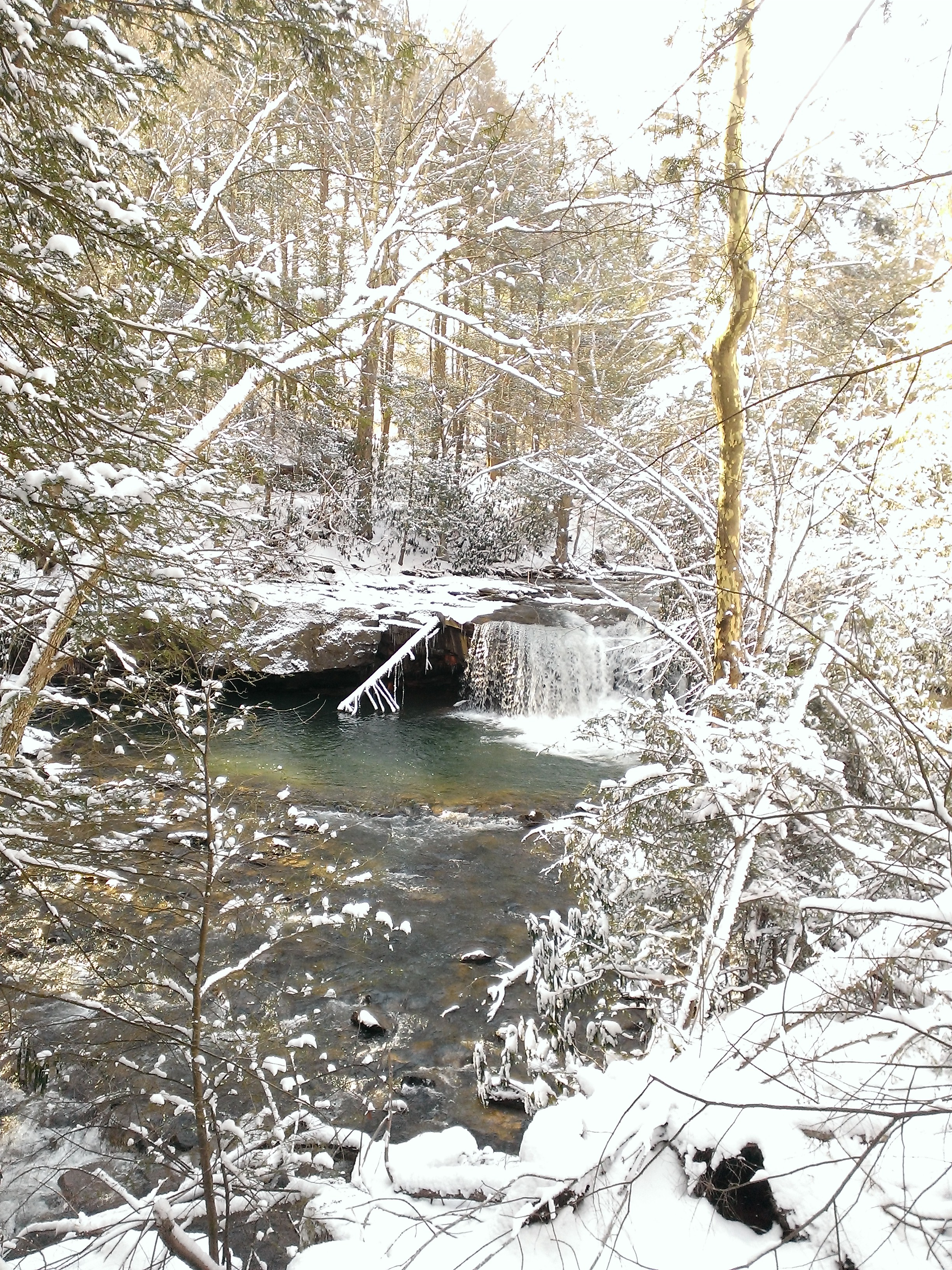
Hominy Falls after a spring snow
