= Ethan Kenning =

American singer, songwriter and musician (born 1943)

Charles Ethan Kenning (born August 19, 1943 in Chicago, Illinois) is an American singer, songwriter and musician who performed as George Edwards when he led 1960s acid rock band, H. P. Lovecraft. He was adopted as a child and brought up under the name George Edwards. He reverted to his birth name of Ethan Kenning in his mid-30s.

In the mid-1960s he performed folk and blues music in clubs in Chicago and as a session singer with Dunwich Records. He released an unsuccessful version of The Beatles' "Norwegian Wood" on Dunwich Records in 1966, before forming a new band, H. P. Lovecraft. The band featured striking vocal harmonies between Edwards and the classically-trained Dave Michaels and atmospheric instrumentation and effects on songs. Some of the band's songs were co-written by Edwards, including some inspired by the writings of the author of the same name. The band released two albums, H. P. Lovecraft in 1967 and H. P. Lovecraft II in 1968 before splitting up in early 1969. Edwards then worked for a time as a music show promoter, before he and original H.P. Lovecraft drummer Michael Tegza formed a new band, Lovecraft. Edwards left this band after their first album.

Edwards, later known as Ethan Kenning, then worked in music production in California and in writing and producing TV and radio commercials. He won two Clio Awards for Levi's commercials with Doc Watson and Leon Redbone and also produced commercials for Taco Bell, Bank of America, and others. He has also worked occasionally with Dave Michaels. More recently he has worked as manager and producer of improvisational singer Rhiannon.

A fictional portrayal of George Edwards appears as the central character in Harry Turtledove's short horror-adventure story "The Fillmore Shoggoth," where a performance of the Lovecraft tribute band is disrupted when Lovecraftian monsters attack the theater.
