= Dave Michaels (musician) =

American keyboard player and singer (born 1944)

David Miotke (born December 15, 1944) is an American keyboard player and singer, who under the name Dave Michaels was co-founder of the 1960s acid rock band H. P. Lovecraft.

Born in Chicago, Miotke studied at Northwestern University earning a bachelor's degree in music theory and composition and a master's degree in applied piano. While an undergraduate in 1967, and performing under the name Dave Michaels, he joined folk singer George Edwards in forming the band H. P. Lovecraft. They released two albums, H. P. Lovecraft and H. P. Lovecraft II, which were both characterised by Edwards and Michaels' striking vocal harmonies and by Michaels' multi-instrumental skills. Michaels departed from the band in September 1968 to return to his studies.

Miotke graduated with honors and continued to work as a musician; singing, playing and arranging many national radio and television commercials. In 1997, he became music director at Max's Opera Cafe in San Francisco and also worked with the cabaret group Bizou. In 2001, he issued a debut solo album, In Dust I Sing, singing and playing original compositions to the ghazal lyrics of Francis Brabazon and Bhau Kalchuri. He also specializes in performing the standard American songbook repertoire of writers such as Cole Porter, George Gershwin, and Rodgers and Hart. In 2021, he was pianist and cantor at the Jazz and Justice Church in Oakland.
