= Carl Bonafede =

American musician (1940–2026)

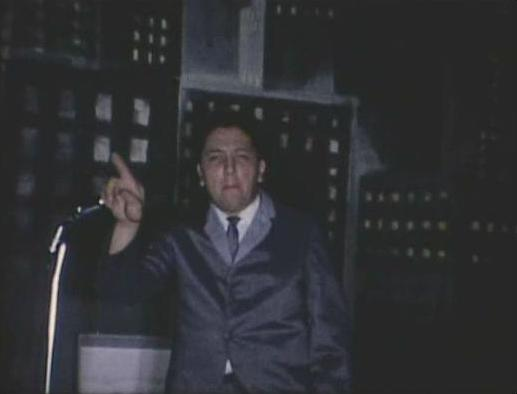
- Carl Bonafede at The Embassy Ballroom in Chicago

Background information
- Also known as: The Screaming Wildman
- Born: Carl Buonafede; October 16, 1940; Chicago, Illinois, U.S.
- Died: March 30, 2026 (aged 85)
- Genres: Pop, rock
- Occupations: singer-songwriter; musician; booking agent; band manager; producer
- Instruments: Accordion
- Years active: 1950–2026
- Labels: USA Records, Delaware Records, Chi Town Records, Tek Records, Mercury Records, Impala Records, Spectra-Sound Records, Cadet records, Calendar records Carl Bonafede was the original manager of the Chicago-based rock band The Buckinghams, who charted in Billboard's Hot 100 in February 1967 with "Kind of a Drag".

Carl Bonafede (October 16, 1940 – March 30, 2026) was an American musician and band manager.

== Life and career ==
Bonafede was born in the Little Italy Chicago community on October 16, 1940. He appeared as a young boy on local television on Morris B. Sach's Amateur Hour singing and playing the accordion. He appeared on an interview show, Ernie Simon's Curbstone Cut-up. He sang his hit record "Were Wolf" on disc-jockey Jim Lounsbury's TV show in Chicago. He went on to promote local bands with his weekly dances at local ballrooms including the Aragon Ballroom, Madura's Danceland and The Holiday Ballroom with owner and collaborator Dan Belloc of big band fame (Billy May Orchestra). He recorded and produced over 200 records with various recording artists. He fronted a local group, The Gem-tones, whose saxophone player, Harry Manfredini, became a movie musical score arranger for the "Friday the 13th" movies. He then turned to managing and promoting local teen bands (garage-bands in the early 60s). His most famous clients were The Buckinghams and the all-girl group The Daughters of Eve. He also managed Thee Prophets, from Wisconsin and Mickey & Larry and the Exciters from Boston. He managed The Delights, in Chicago. He worked for the Willard Alexander Booking Agency with agent Herb Gronauer, who now promotes celebrities in Palm Springs, California. He also worked for the CASK Attractions agency.

As a young band manager Bonafede promoted many young teens in a new phenomenon – the garage band. One of these groups included The Fabulous Centuries. The Centuries consisted of Nick Fortuna, Curtis Bachman, Carl Giammarese and Jerry Elarde. Carl Bonafede first crossed paths with Phil Orsi in 1964 when Phil was fronting Phil Orsi and the Little Kings at the Vogue Ballroom in Chicago. Another group with great vocal harmonies was known as The Pulsations. John Poulos, Dennis Miccolis, George LeGros and Dennis Tufano were members of The Pulsations. These two groups merged to form The Buckinghams. One day, Sheldon Cooper, an executive at WGN-TV, witnessed a promotion of Carl's outside Lane Tech High School across the street from WGN-TV's studios. Carl's discussion with Cooper led to The Pulsations entering and winning a competition to appear for 13 weeks on The All-Time Hits, Chicago's first locally produced TV program broadcast in color, featuring a variety of musical guests. By the end of the 13-week run, the Pulsations/Fabulous Centuries became The Buckinghams. He was on hand at the Chess Records studios in Chicago, Illinois to record "Kind of a Drag" with the Buckinghams co-producer Dan Belloc and arranger Frank Tesinsky. Jim Holvay of the local Chicago group The Mob was the composer of "Kind of a Drag".

As of 2017, Carl Bonafede aka "The Screaming Wildman" (a nickname given to him by a priest who witnessed Carl running a local parish teenage dance) lived and worked in Chicago in the Lincoln Park area, close to the lakefront. He died on March 30, 2026, at the age of 85.

== Discography ==
=== The Daughters of Eve ===
USA 1779, 1966.

- "Hey Lover"
  - Originally a modest hit for Debbie Dovale in 1963.
- "Stand by Me"
  - Produced by Carl Bonafede and Ron Malo.

USA 891, 1967.

- "Symphony of My Soul"
  - Penned by Chicago songwriter James Butler (with a little help from Tchaikovsky).
- "Help Me Boy"
  - As "Help Me Girl", a hit for Eric Burdon and The Animals earlier in 1967.
  - Produced by Carl Bonafede and James Butler.

Spectra Sound 920, 1967.

- "Don't Waste My Time"
  - Written by John Serafini.
- "He Cried"
  - As popularised by The Shangri-Las, and previously a hit, as "She Cried", for Jay and the Americans in 1962.
  - Produced by Carl Bonafede, engineered by Ron Malo.

Cadet 5600, 1968.

- "Social Tragedy"
  - Written by James Butler, and subsequently recorded, as "Don't Let It Slip Away", by Ral Donner.
- "A Thousand Stars"
  - Introduced by The Rivileers in 1954, but popularised by Kathy Young and The Innocents in 1960.
  - Produced by Carl Bonafede, engineered by Gary Knipper and Ed Cody.
