= Larry Nestor =

American singer-songwriter and author

- Born: Laurence Francis Nestor; January 29, 1940 (age 86); Chicago, Illinois
- Occupations: Author, musician, songwriter
- Writing career
- Genres: Children's books, musicals, song lyrics, novels

Laurence Francis Nestor (born January 29, 1940) is a singer, songwriter, and author from River Grove, Illinois. Nestor is a member of the American Federation of Musicians and the American Society of Composers, Authors, and Publishers.

== Career as musician ==
Nestor played keyboards for a short time for The Buckinghams in the early years after the original keyboard player, Dennis Miccolis, left shortly after the Chess Studio recording sessions of Kind of a Drag. Nestor was eventually replaced by Marty Grebb before The Buckinghams hit the charts with Don't You Care, Susan and Hey Baby.

== Songwriting ==
Nestor's songwriting career started in 1962 while still in high school. He was a staff songwriter at Chicago label One-derful Records.

Nestor wrote the song "Loving on Borrowed Time" on Wise World Records for Phil Orsi & The Little Kings in 1963

== Career as author ==
Nestor is also the author and collaborator on several children's books and novels.
