= List of people from Saginaw, Michigan =

The following is a list of notable people associated with Saginaw, Michigan. These people were born or lived in Saginaw.

== Artists ==
- E. Irving Couse (1866–1936), painter; founding member of the Taos Society of Artists
- Curtis Harding (born 1979), singer, and songwriter
- Robert Nickle (1919–1980), visual artist, collagist
- Bernard C. Wetzel (1876–1952), architect, raised in Saginaw

== Business, academic, and labor figures ==
- Sewell Avery (1874–1960), chairman of U.S. Gypsum Corporation and Montgomery Ward
- Edward G. Begle (1914–1978), mathematician specializing in topology; director of the School Mathematics Study Group, credited with developing what came to be known as new math
- Wellington R. Burt (1831–1919), wealthy industrialist
- Harold J. Grimm (1901–1983), professor of history and expert on Protestant Reformation
- Nafe Katter (1927–2014), professor of theatre at the University of Connecticut

== Government, political, and military figures ==
- Aaron T. Bliss, governor of Michigan
- Ferdinand Brucker, US House of Representatives (1897–1899)
- Wilber Marion Brucker, governor of Michigan 1931–1933, secretary of the Army 1955–1961
- Louis Campau, pioneer who lived in Saginaw before he founded Grand Rapids
- L. Perry Cookingham, first city manager
- Morris Courtright, Arizona state representative
- Frank Emerson, 15th governor of Wyoming
- Robert G. Heft, designer of the current American flag
- Edward Heinemann, aircraft designer responsible, wholly or in part, for 20 major military aircraft, including the A-4 Skyhawk light bomber, the F3D Skyknight night fighter and the F4D Skyray carrier-based fighter aircraft
- Janet J. McCoy, high commissioner of the Trust Territory of the Pacific Islands
- William Butts Mershon, Saginaw mayor, author and businessman
- Rose M. Poole, Oregon businesswoman and politician
- Ernest A. Snow, Michigan Supreme Court justice

== Entertainment figures ==
- Heidi Androl, actress, contestant on The Apprentice Season 6
- Mars Argo (born Brittany Alexandria Sheets), singer/songwriter, former lead singer of the band Mars Argo
- Robert Armstrong, actor, star of King Kong, nephew of playwright Paul Armstrong
- Sophina Brown, actress
- Sean Chiplock, voice actor
- William Clemens, film director
- Little Jimmy Dickens, country music singer
- Sonny Digital, musician
- Matthew Glave, actor
- Paul Walter Hauser, actor
- Brian d'Arcy James, musician and actor
- Isham Jones, musician
- Laurie Beebe Lewis, born Laurie Seaman, singer with Pitche Blende, The New Mamas and The Papas, and The Buckinghams
- Stephen Lynch, Tony Award–nominated actor, comedian and musician
- Gerald Marks, songwriter
- Tim McCoy, cowboy actor, member of Cowboy Hall of Fame
- S. Epatha Merkerson, actress (Law & Order)
- Ruth Nelson, actress
- Anthony Ray Parker, actor
- Prozak, born Steven T. Shippy, rapper
- Question Mark and the Mysterians, rock band
- James St. James, TV personality and celebutante
- Harry Shannon, actor, Citizen Kane
- Sonny Stitt, jazz musician
- Lem Tucker, Emmy-winning reporter
- Dick Wagner, musician
- Harry Watson, Jr., actor
- Sharrie Williams, gospel blues singer/songwriter
- Stevie Wonder, singer, musician and composer, winner of 25 Grammy Awards

== Sports figures ==
- Alfonso Boone, NFL player
- Ken Brown, NFL player
- Monty Brown, professional wrestler and NFL player
- Bob Buhl, pitcher for Milwaukee Braves, Chicago Cubs and Philadelphia Phillies
- Blair White, NFL player for Indianapolis Colts
- Brian Cole II, NFL player for Miami Dolphins
- Bob Devaney, football coach
- Draymond Green, NBA player
- Darvin Ham, NBA player and coach
- Tory Humphrey, NFL player for Green Bay Packers
- Kid Lavigne, boxer, world lightweight champion 1896–1899
- Damon Lowery, basketball player
- Mark Macon, NBA player
- Roy Manning, NFL player
- Kenyon Martin, NBA player
- Terry McDaniel, NFL Pro Bowler for Green Bay Packers and Los Angeles Raiders
- Herbert H. Ramsay, golf administrator and president of the United States Golf Association
- James Reed, NFL player
- Jason Richardson, NBA player
- Anthony Roberson, NBA player
- Charles Rogers, NFL player
- Clifton Ryan, NFL player
- Stuart Schweigert, NFL player
- Spencer Schwellenbach, MLB player
- Tom Smallwood, professional ten-pin bowler and winner of the 2009 PBA World Championship
- Deon Strother, NFL player
- Sam Sword, NFL player
- Serena Williams, seven-time Australian Open, three-time French Open, seven-time Wimbledon, six-time U.S. Open and Olympic tennis champion
- Lamarr Woodley, NFL player
- Curt Young, MLB player and pitching coach

== Writers and journalists ==
- George F. Lewis, journalist, proprietor of newspapers
- Doug Peacock (born 1942), author, grizzly bear expert, lecturer
- Theodore Roethke (1908–1963), poet

== See also ==
- List of mayors of Saginaw
