= Jim Holvay =

American rock singer-songwriter and musician (b. 1945)

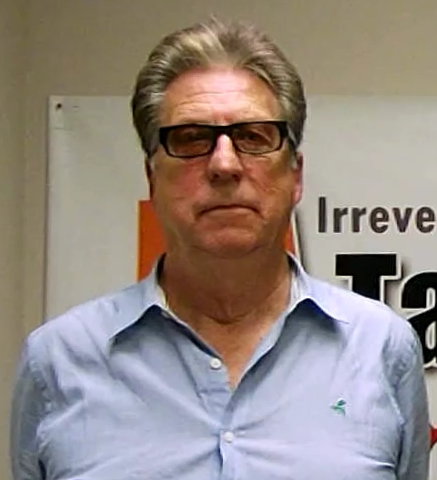
- Holvay in 2016

Background information
- Also known as: "Soul"
- Born: James Steven Holvay; May 16, 1945 (age 81); Chicago, Illinois, U.S.
- Genres: Soul, rhythm and blues, pop, rock
- Years active: 1961–present
- Labels: Cameo Parkway, USA, Mercury, Twinight, Daylight, Colossus, Private Stock, Odyssey
- Website: jamesholvay.com

James Steven "Jimmy Soul" Holvay (born May 16, 1945) is an American rock singer-songwriter and musician who wrote "Kind of a Drag", a number one hit for The Buckinghams. He is one of the founding members of The MOB, the first rock band to perform at a Presidential Inaugural Concert & Ball.

Holvay has co-written other songs for The Buckinghams, including "Don't You Care", "Hey Baby (They're Playing Our Song)", and "Susan", and for other artists including The MOB ("I Dig Everything About You," "Give It To Me").

== Early life ==
In his early years, while attending St. Barbara School in Brookfield, Jim's brother, Dennis, brought home the 78 rpm record of "Rock Around the Clock" by Bill Haley And His Comets, which accelerated Holvay's interest in music.

With money saved, Holvay bought his first guitar along with a Mel Bay chord book at the age of 12. Dennis found out the frustrations about how hard it was to push the strings down to the fret board and had an idea. When their father asked Dennis what he thought Jimmy would like for Christmas that year the answer was a better guitar. That Christmas, he unwrapped the princely sum of $75, a Hofner archtop guitar. That spring, Dennis suggested to his father that Jimmy would like a DeArmond pickup and a Supro amplifier for his birthday.

In 7th grade he formed The Rockin' Rebels. His first paying gig was at the opening of a Go-Kart Shop in Lyons, IL. A couple years of guitar lessons plus a recording session featuring two blues-progression instrumentals, Holvay entered Lyons Township High School as a freshman in 1959. Then, he played in a group called Jimmy & The Jesters. His father drove him to Record Row on the south side of Chicago. Within a few blocks of each other were the labels Vee Jay, Constellation, King and Chess Records. Holvay met Chess Records A&R Willie Dixon with his acetate tape in hand. Even though Holvay was turned down, to his advantage, he received constructive criticism that would help him. Holvay also met Leonard Chess and Curtis Mayfield who influenced Holvay's songwriting and guitar playing. While in high school, he purchased a sunburst-finish Fender Stratocaster, played and recorded a couple of songs on Terry Records with an Aurora, Illinois band named The MayBees and met his longtime collaborator, Gary Beisbier. During his junior and senior years, Holvay connected with Jim Lounsbury, the local TV dance show host, and played at the Lounsbury record hops in Illinois, Michigan, Indiana and Wisconsin. Holvay graduated in 1963 and joined a band called The Chicagoans with Beisbier.

In mid-1963, the Chicagoans became the house band on Danceville, U.S.A. Lounsbury's weekly live TV show. Later that year, the group moved to New York and played The Peppermint Lounge, The Metropole Cafe and Arthur's Tavern. The Chicagoans went on tour traveling to countless venues across the U.S. and Canada. One recording session yielded an instrumental written by Holvay and Beisbier titled "Beatle Time." WLS Program Director Clark Weber suggested the group should be called The Livers (referring to Liverpool) and the record charted on the Silver Dollar Survey in early 1964. After tours playing ballrooms throughout the Midwest backing up Terry Stafford, Chubby Checker, Nino Tempo & April Stevens - the group moved to San Francisco. Then, they worked clubs in North Beach (pre-"Monterey") alongside Sly Stewart & his Mojo Men, The Beau Brummels, Pat & Lolly Vegas, The Gauchos, and The Nooney Rickett 4. Afterwards, Holvay returned home and registered for Junior College.

While in college, Holvay wrote and produced various local artists, most notably, Ral Donner and Dee Clark. Then Holvay was offered a gig as the guitarist for the Dick Clark Caravan of Stars.

== Caravan of Stars ==
Holvay worked as a permanent guitarist on the Dick Clark Caravan of Stars tour, criss-crossed the US and Canada in Greyhound buses and backed-up artists. The Caravan Of Stars was a road show featuring some of the most popular stars and musical groups produced and presented by Dick Clark. While on the Caravan Of Stars bus, Holvay and Brian Hyland wrote songs together. Later, Holvay enrolled back in junior college.

== The MOB first to feature The Chicago Horn Rock Sound ==
One goal was to help finance school tuition by playing clubs with a "dream" band. In November 1965, Sistak posed the question to Holvay. "Jim. If you could wave a magic wand, what kind've [sic] a group would you put together?" Holvay responded, "I'd put together an ass-kicking horn band with the best musicians I could find. We'd play soul music and have the greatest live show that ever existed. It's never been done before." After seeing an old gangster movie on a late night movie TV channel on WGN, Holvay came up with the concept for the group. The name of that old movie was called The MOB. The group will have a full blown horn section, singers, etc., so there'll be a mob of people on stage. Being from a gangster town, the group will wear pinstripe suits, black shirts, white ties and carnations.

WLS Radio may have been the first station to break "Cherish" by The Association, which went to number one and subsequently spread across the country. The record label flew The Association out to Chicago to thank the jocks at the station for playing the record and making it number one. After their visit to the radio station, Terry Kirkman and the guys said that they asked who the hot band was in town. The jocks told the fellas, "Go see The MOB out at a club near O'Hare". (i.e. The Wine and Roses) The MOB met The Association and became good friends, which resulted in The MOB becoming their opening act on a lot of their college dates (years later, The Association's manager Pat Collechio, became The MOB's manager).

The Association flew back home to Los Angeles and told Capitol Records that they need to sign this great band which they had just seen in Chicago. Within a few weeks, The MOB recorded in Studio A at the Capitol Records tower on Vine Street in Hollywood. It may have been Nik Venet who produced three songs that Beisbier and Holvay had written. After that session, The MOB flew back home to continue residency at The Wine and Roses and waited to hear what the verdict was on our newly created horn rock sound. Sal Innucci (the then President of Capitol Records) heard the tracks and said, "Dump the horns and add more guitars". The group was not going to do that because that is not who the group was. The MOB felt they had something different and unique that would separate us from all of the Beatle influenced bands there were happening at the time.

== Songwriting ==
Carl Bonafede was a Chicago band promoter for weekly dances at local ballrooms. He managed The Buckinghams when Bonafedel gave Holvay a call. Holvay first met Bonafede at a Jim Lounsbury record hop, the Willowbrook Ballroom, while Carl was singing with the Gem-Tones back in 1960. Bonafede told Holvay that The Buckinghams covered Beatles songs and Holvay replied that he wrote R&B/soul songs. "I was dinking around on a spinet piano in a music practice room at Lyons Township Junior College and wrote Kind of a Drag. I wasn't sure Carl remembered I was a songwriter until he asked if I had any tunes. Yeah, I do have something, and Carl asked when he could hear it. I remember cutting a demo of the song on acoustic guitar between shows," he recalled.

Later Carl with a Wollensak tape recorder, found Holvay at a club where, in the dressing room, he played his "pop genre" tune on an acoustic guitar. Months later "Kind Of A Drag" was on WLS Radio. Turns out that the producer added horns to the song because of hearing The MOB perform at clubs around town. He knew Holvay of the R & B group the MOB to be a good songwriter from previous use of his songs.

== The MOB - South Dakota Rock and Roll Music Association inductee ==
Located in Sioux Falls, SD during the 70s was the renown showroom, the Mocamba Club. Top acts played the club and The MOB is said to be, the most booked act and the biggest draws that the Mocamba Club had. October 2010, Don Fritz, President of the South Dakota Rock & Roll Music Association informed that The MOB was selected under the category "bands". Inducted April 16, 2011, at the Ramkota Exhibit Hall in Sioux Falls, SD more than 2,000 people in attendance saw and heard The MOB in person, their first reunion in 35 years.

== Eastside Heartbeats ==
Holvay was interviewed by Tom Waldman for a 2014 KLCS-TV PBS episode of Rock 'N Roll Stories. Waldman co-wrote the 1998 book Land Of A Thousand Dances: Chicano Rock 'N' Roll From Southern California with David Reyes. Waldman wrote a script based on the music scene of East L.A. in the 1960s and showed Holvay. Waldman then asked Holvay to compose music for the play. The tunes were to feel like Cannibal & the Headhunters' "Land of a 1,000 Dances" but original. The songs, sung by an unknown group following their dream and opening for a group such as The Beatles at a venue similar to the Hollywood Bowl in 1965. Holvay worked with David Reyes, Rudy Salas and Tom Waldman resulting in the soundtrack for Eastside Heartbeats-The Musical.

== Discography (limited label composer credits) ==
- Billy Eckstine – "I Dig Everything About You" – Motorcity Records MOTC LP41 (1990)
- Brian Hyland – "One Night Jimmy" – Phillips PHM 200-217 (1966)
- Brian Hyland – "Stay Away From Her" – Phillips 40306 (1965)
- The Buckinghams – "Kind Of A Drag" – USA Records 860 (1966)
- Chick And The Nobles – "Island For Two" – USA 772 (1964)
- Cisse – "Kind Of A Drag" – Scandia SLP 669 (1979)
- Cisse Häkkinen – "Kind Of A Drag" – Sonet Grammofon AB – SLP-3047 (1979)
- Dee Clark – "I Can't Run Away" – Constellation C-155 (1965)
- Dee Clark – "She's My Baby" – Constellation C-155 (1965)
- Donovan James
- Eastside Heartbeats – "We're the Eastside Heartbeats" Agave Entertainment, llc (2016)
- Eastside Heartbeats – "They Don't Know Me" Agave Entertainment, llc (2016)
- Eastside Heartbeats – "It's All Good" Agave Entertainment, llc (2016)
- Eastside Heartbeats – "Stars By '66" Agave Entertainment, llc (2016)
- Eastside Heartbeats – "Bad Dads" Agave Entertainment, llc (2016)
- Eastside Heartbeats – "Don't Screw Up (La La Song)" Agave Entertainment, llc (2016)
- Eastside Heartbeats – "We Got Fans" Agave Entertainment, llc (2016)
- Eastside Heartbeats – "Thank You Mr. Epstein" Agave Entertainment, llc (2016)
- Eastside Heartbeats – "We Are One" Agave Entertainment, llc (2016)
- Eastside Heartbeats – "If You Only Knew" Agave Entertainment, llc (2016)
- Eastside Heartbeats – "Take Me Back to the Eastside" Agave Entertainment, llc (2016)
- Eastside Heartbeats – "We Got Fans" (Reprise) Agave Entertainment, llc (2016)
- Father Time – "Another Summer To Remember" – Impala C-T 4 (xxxx)
- Frank Pizani – "Candy And Me" – Chi-Town C-T-3 (1976)
- Image – "Kind Of A Drag" – Chaparral 552 (xxxx)
- Jimmy Peterson
- J.E.F – Japanese Electric Foundation – "Don't You Care" – Popsize PTP-90393 (1986)
- Jonna – "Like It Is" – Puppet Records & Yume Records FITROCD013 (2015)
- Kane And Abel – "Break Down And Cry" – Destination 607 (1965)
- Kane And Abel – "He Will Break Your Heart" – Red Bird 10-059 (1966)
- Kane And Abel – "Life Of The Party" – Destination 619 (1966)
- Loreen Church – "Put Down" – Barry B-3355X (1965)
- Mike And Michael – "My Neighborhood" – Constellation C-156 (1964)
- Mike And Michael – "Where Have You Been" – Constellation C-156 (1964)
- Mike And Michael – "My Neighborhood" – Manhattan M-36 (1964)
- Mike And Michael – "Where Have You Been" – Manhattan M-36 (1964)
- Mike Nelson – "I Dig Everything About You" – Thunder Tummy MN-101 (1974)
- Mousie & The Traps – "How About You" – Toddlin' Town 8204 (1966)
- Mousie & The Traps – "It's All In The Way (You Look At It Baby)" – Toddlin' Town 8204 (1966)
- Ral Donner – "It Will Only Make Me Love You More" – Red Bird RB 10-057 (1966)
- The Buckinghams – "Don't You Care" – Columbia 4-44053 (1967)
- The Buckinghams – "Hey Baby (They're Playing Our Song)" – Columbia 4-44254 (1967)
- The Buckinghams – "Kind Of A Drag" – USA 860 (1966)
- The Buckinghams – "Love Ain't Enough" – USA 853 (1966)
- The Buckinghams – "Makin' Up And Breakin' Up" – USA 848 (1966)
- The Buckinghams – "Makin' Up And Breakin' Up" – USA 869 (1967)
- The Buckinghams – "Susan" – Columbia 4-44378 (1967)
- The Buckinghams – "Why Don't You Love Me" – Columbia 4-44053 (1967)
- The Chicago Fire – "Come See What I've Got" – USA 898 (1968)
- The Chicago Fire – "Candy And Me" – USA 898 (1968)
- The Chords – "Don't You Care" – Hit Records 291 (1967)
- The Illinois Tollway – "Another Summer To Remember" – Spectra Sound 101 (xxxx)
- The Illinois Tollway – "Candy And Me" – Spectra Sound 101 (xxxx)
- The Livers (The Chicagoans) – "Beatle Time" – Constellation C-118 (1964)
- The Missing Links – "Makin' Up And Breaking Up" – Signett 931S-6460 (1966)
- The Missing Links – "You Hypnotize Me" – Signett 931S-6460 (1966)
- The MOB
- The Nobles – "That Special One" – USA 788 (1965)
- The Outsiders – "Kind Of A Drag" – Capitol T-2636 (1967)
- The Quests – "She's The One" – Columbia 33OSX-7775 (1966)
- The Thunderbirds – "Before It's Too Late" – Delaware D-1710 (1965)
- Thee Prophets – "Kind Of A Drag" – Kapp KS-3596 (1969)
