= Dennis Tufano =

American singer (born 1946)

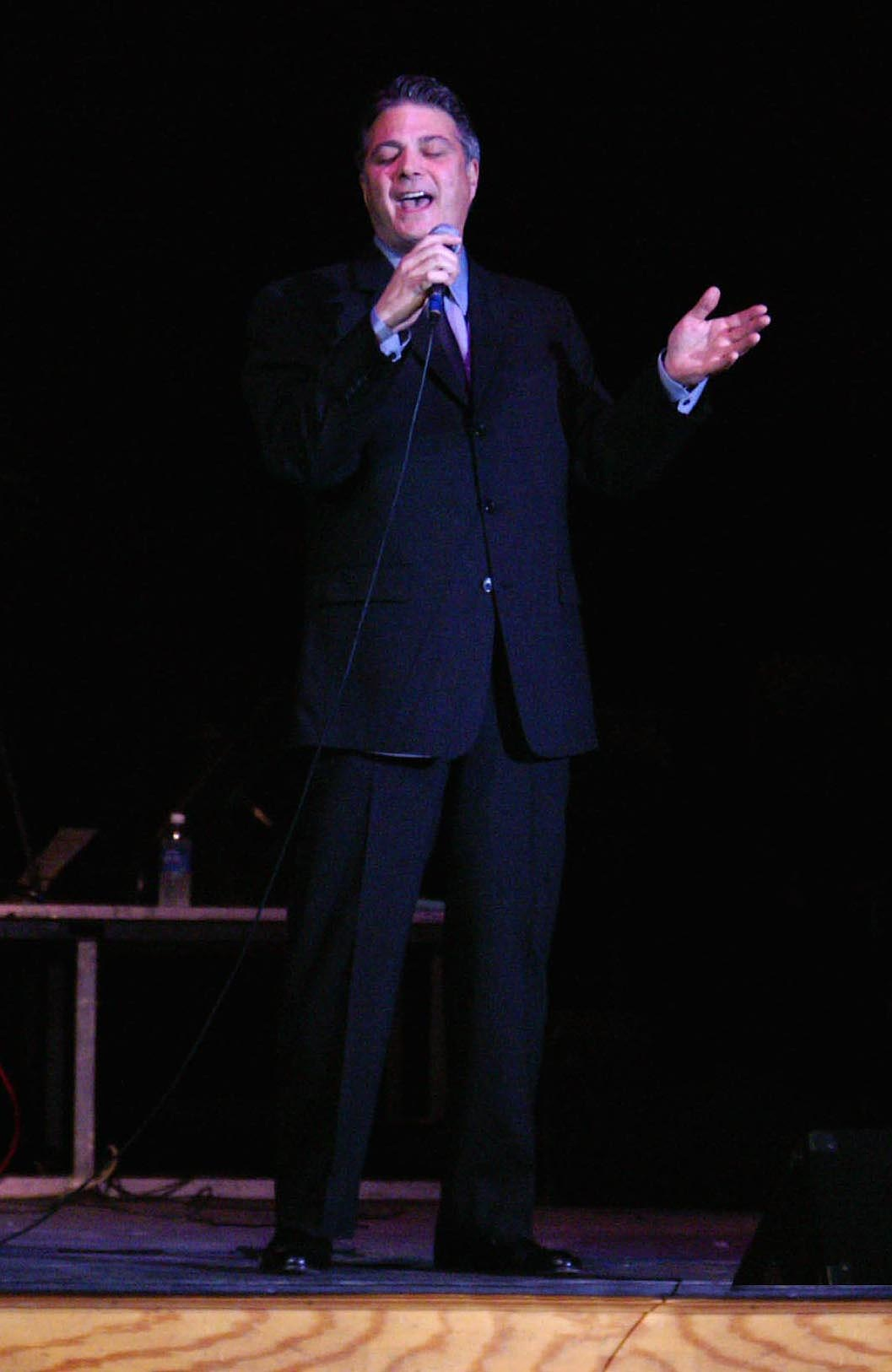
- Tufano in 2007

Background information
- Born: September 11, 1946 (age 80); Chicago, Illinois, U.S.
- Genre: Sunshine pop
- Occupations: Singer, songwriter
- Years active: 1960s–present
- Formerly of: The Buckinghams

Dennis Stanley Joseph Tufano (born September 11, 1946) is the original lead singer of the 1960s rock group The Buckinghams, and has been a solo performer since the early 1980s.

== Biography ==
Dennis Tufano was born in Chicago, Illinois. He attended St. Sylvester grade school and Gordon Tech High School. His father was also a singer and played the violin, saxophone and harmonica.

== Career ==
=== Early career ===
The Chicago band scene included clubs, high school dances, battle of the band contests and local hit parade shows. Many burgeoning bands competed for local radio airplay and a chance at stardom. Dennis Tufano was part of the Chicago rock and roll band invasion to hit the charts in the late 1960s. He was a member of The Pulsations (early to mid-1960s) with John Poulos (1947–1980).

=== The Buckinghams ===
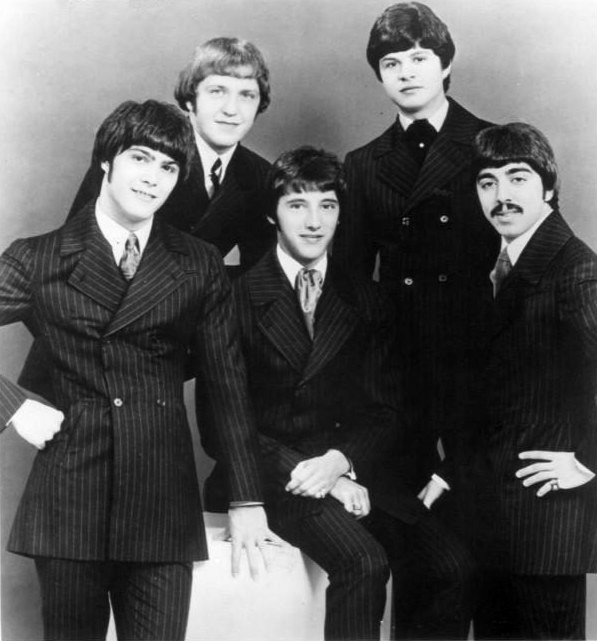
The Buckinghams in 1968. Left to right: Dennis Tufano, Marty Grebb, John Poulos, Carl Giammarese and Nick Fortuna.

In 1965, Tufano and Poulos were joined in The Pulsations by two members of The Centuries, bass player Nick Fortuna (born 1947) and guitarist Carl Giammarese (born 1947). Dennis Miccolis joined the group as keyboard player. "Jon Poulos [drums] and I knew each other from the neighborhood and we were the first in the band," said Tufano. The Pulsations name was retained until the group auditioned for a spot on the "All Time Hits" variety show on local powerhouse television station, WGN-TV. The producers wanted them to have a more British-sounding name, and a security guard suggested The Buckinghams. The group won a 13-week contract.

Between December 1966 and February 1968 the Buckinghams charted with five big hits on Billboard's Hot 100, starting with the chart-topping "Kind of a Drag" – which replaced the Monkees' "I'm a Believer" at number one – and followed by "Don't You Care" (no. 6), "Mercy, Mercy, Mercy" (no. 5), "Hey Baby (They're Playing Our Song)" (no. 12) and "Susan" (no. 11). Plus "Laudy Miss Claudy" (no. 41, 1967) and "Back in Love Again" (no. 57, 1968).

In 2015, Tufano reunited with The Buckinghams as a benefit concert for Marty Grebb, who was a member of the group during the 1960s. The concert featured Tufano, Carl Giammarese and Nick Fortuna with Grebb.

=== Tufano and Giammarese ===
Following his success in the Buckinghams, Tufano was part of the singer/songwriting duo Tufano and Giammarese, who recorded three albums with Lou Adler's custom label, Ode Records. The duo toured in support of the albums, including a rather rambunctious tour with Cheech & Chong. John Poulos served as the group's manager.

=== Later works ===
Appearing as guest vocalist, Tufano went on to co-write with composer and musician Tom Scott. Using a song composed by Scott and Jeff Barry, Tufano and Mindy Sterling performed the original title/theme song "Us" for the initial four episodes of the TV series Family Ties. After 10 episodes, their version was replaced by one performed by Johnny Mathis and Deniece Williams, and the song was retitled "Without Us". As an actor, voiceover artist and sometimes stuntman, Tufano has appeared in theater productions in Los Angeles and has worked in film, television, radio and commercials.

Back on the road, Tufano joined Olivia Newton-John on one of her hugely successful tours, and was noted for his duets with her, including "Suddenly," and "You're the One that I Want." The duets were featured on Newton-John's HBO Special, which aired in January 1983.

Dennis Tufano also composed music and performed with Bernie Taupin, Elton John's lyricist, on Taupin's album He Who Rides the Tiger. Subsequently, for Taupin's group, the Farm Dogs, Tufano teamed again with the lyricist to co-write, co-produce and perform on the Farm Dogs' album Last Stand in Open Country.

Tufano was also one of the founding members of an improvisational voice-ensemble called the LA.MadDogs. In 1992, this group of actors began performing in hundreds of movies and numerous television shows. They have produced and performed seven "live" radio dramas, three of which Tufano directed, for KMPC Radio Theater in Los Angeles.

Tufano produced, directed and shot a documentary in Chicago, Major Hall: Therapy Tuesday. He taped a performance for the PBS music series My Generation – The '60s, which first aired in March 2008, and was a part of the award-winning PBS-DVD series. An expanded version of the show aired on PBS in September 2008.

Tufano performed a classic Chicago rock concert with The Cryan' Shames in the summer of 2008, and appeared with Marty Grebb and Bruce Conte outside Manila in the Philippines in late fall 2008. Tufano continues to perform with his tribute to Bobby Darin As Long As I'm Singing: The Music of Bobby Darin and he makes appearances with his classic rock show. He maintains a full concert schedule for most of each year, performing with various "oldies" artists and bands.
