= Metropole Cafe =

Former jazz club in New York, US

The Metropole Cafe was a jazz club in New York's Manhattan in the 1950s and 1960s. Located at 725 Seventh Avenue near Times Square, it was primarily noted in the bebop and progressive jazz era as a venue for traditional musicians. It later featured go-go dancers and rock bands, and was renamed the Metropole Go-Go.

== History ==
The venue's name came from the renowned Hotel Metropole, located at 43rd St. and Broadway in Manhattan.

When Ben Harriman took over the Metropole Cafe in the 1950s, he made a few changes to the club's look. Initially, it was a "Gay 90s-type joint" with nostalgic acts for the elderly crowd, featuring old vaudeville performers on the corner of 48th Street and Seventh Avenue before moving a few doors along and becoming a live music bar. Then, because Harriman loved jazz, he transformed the Metropole into "New York's free temple of jazz."

Henry "Red" Allen, a New Orleans veteran of many bands, including King Oliver's and Fletcher Henderson's, led the house band beginning in 1954.

The Metropole featured jazz performances in the afternoon and evening. Its bandstand was a long runway behind the bar that proved convenient when the club abandoned jazz in later years to feature strippers. Noted songwriters Jim Holvay and Gary Beisbier (who penned hit songs for the Buckinghams in the late 1960s) were part of an R&B band called The Chicagoans who played at the Metropole Cafe in fall 1963.

Other resident performers at the club included Roy Eldridge, Coleman Hawkins, Cozy Cole, Charlie Shavers, Zutty Singleton, Claude Hopkins, J. C. Higginbotham, Tony Scott, Max Kaminsky, Sol Yaged, Maynard Ferguson (in 1964) and Buster Bailey. In June 1965, Gene Krupa and Mongo Santamaria performed before Harriman changed the jazz policy. The new policy had go-go dancers with rock 'n roll acts all afternoon, at night, jazz alternating with them 45 minutes each.

In 1968, the Metropole was home to a variety of rock bands. Featured were two bands per period; a two-week stint in most cases. The bands alternated sets, each on stage for an hour, over a 12-hour stretch from 4 p.m. to 4 a.m. During their individual sets, go-go dancers wearing skimpy bikini outfits were stationed across the runway stage behind the bar, which was usually frequented by older men who might have wandered into the club throughout the day and night.

By the 1970s, the biggest draw at the Metropole was the topless go-go dancers. The club was plagued with problems under new ownership. The Metropole reopened in 1972 after being briefly shuttered. In 1973, after the cafe had closed for the evening, a bomb went off at the Metropole. In 1978, the owner, Sam Nagar was arrested for drug trafficking.

== In pop culture ==
In the film version of Neil Simon's The Odd Couple (1968), Felix Ungar stops by the Metropole after a suicide attempt at the beginning of the film.
