= John Poulos =

American drummer (1947–1980)

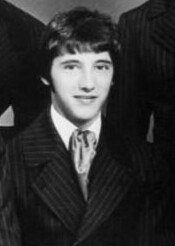
- Poulos in 1968

Background information
- Also known as: Jon Jon
- Born: March 31, 1947
- Origin: Chicago, Illinois, U.S.
- Died: March 26, 1980 (aged 32)
- Genres: Rock and roll; R&B; pop
- Occupation: Drummer

John Poulos (March 31, 1947 – March 26, 1980), also known by his nickname Jon Jon, was the original drummer for The Buckinghams, and one of its founding members in 1965.

== Early life ==
His mother Ann and father John Sr. are of Greek origin. He graduated from Roosevelt High School in the Albany Park neighborhood of Chicago, Illinois in 1965. Lead guitar player Carl Giammarese lived only a few blocks away from John Poulos in the Albany Park neighborhood of Chicago. His nickname since his late teens was "Jon Jon". John Poulos was the leader of a high school band in Chicago called "The Pulsations".

== Career ==
He approached singers George LeGros and Dennis Tufano who sang harmonies in an a cappella group called The Darsals to come join his band, "The Pulsations". Local Chicago-area deejay and booking agent for Willard Alexander, Carl Bonafede, attests to the fact that John personally recruited singers Dennis Tufano and his close friend George Legros at Gordon Technical High School.

John Poulos approached Carl Bonafede who spun records for Dan Belloc's dances at the Holiday ballroom about becoming the manager of John's high school band "The Pulsations".

When USA Records released The Buckinghams from their contract, the band had a #1 hit on the Billboard Hot 100 charts with Kind of a Drag. The members voted to part ways with personal manager Carl Bonafede. John Poulos and Dennis Tufano flew out to Los Angeles to meet with James William Guercio to seek management and a new record deal. The meeting with Guercio led to The Buckinghams signing a new record contract with Columbia Records. John went into the music management side of the music business after The Buckinghams agreed to part ways in 1970. John managed his fellow ex-Buckinghams Carl Giammarese and Dennis Tufano when they formed a duo called "Tufano & Giammarese". When The Buckinghams broke up in 1970 and Nick departed for a career in R&B and Marty wanted to go a different direction, Dennis Tufano and Carl decided to form a duo, Dennis and Carl. They put together a demo tape, with the help of Peter Shelton and his wife, and John determined to manage them and find them a recording deal. John brought them to Ode Records, where they signed with Lou Adler, becoming "Tufano and Giammarese" and spending 7 years of their career together. John Poulos managed several other Illinois bands, most notably a band from the St. Charles area called The Boyzz (from Illinois).

John had one child, a daughter named Polly born in September 1970. He died of heart failure in his Chicago home just short of his 33rd birthday in 1980. Carl Bonafede maintains there never would have been The Buckinghams band if not for the commitment of John Poulos.
