= Ron Malo =

American engineer

Ronald Clements Malo (August 29, 1935 in Illinois – August 15, 1992 in Burbank, California) was an American engineer for Chicago's Chess Studios from 1959 until 1970. He was the engineer for the first sessions the Rolling Stones did in the US, in Chicago in June 1964, recording songs ("It's All Over Now", "I Can't Be Satisfied", "Look What You've Done", "Around and Around", "Down the Road a Piece" etc.) that wound up appearing on the albums 12 X 5, The Rolling Stones, Now! and December's Children (And Everybody's). He was also the engineer at Chess when they returned in November 1964 to do more sessions there, and when they came back a third time in May 1965 (resulting in Out of Our Heads songs such as "Mercy Mercy" and "That's How Strong My Love Is").

Malo worked with many of the blues and R&B musicians, such as Bo Diddley, Etta James, Sonny Boy Williamson, and Chuck Berry, as well as some jazz musicians including Cannonball Adderley. He went on to work with Muddy Waters, Howlin' Wolf, Buddy Guy, and John Lee Hooker. Malo was the engineer in the Buckinghams "Kind of a Drag" recording sessions. "Ron Malo was the engineer," says Dennis Tufano. "He was unbelievably creative. That was a great introduction. We were gifted with some very, very talented people at the beginning. A lot of the guys would get some garage guy that was gonna engineer your album. We got Ron Malo, which was like, 'Whoa!' And just working with him was an education." Bonafede and bandleader Dan Belloc co-produced the LP. "Frank Tesinsky was the arranger," says Dennis. "Dan Belloc played on it. He actually played sax on it. He was a sax player, Tesinsky was a trombonist." The Daughters of Eve, the all-female band from Chicago managed by Carl Bonafede got to record at Chess and Malo was the engineer for those sessions.

In the 1970s, he worked with Billy Joel, and engineered the lost tapes of "The Brothres" in 1973 at Bolic Sound Studio in Los Angeles (featuring the Kirk brothers from Missouri). He was also the recording engineer on the Bobby Goldsboro album A Butterfly For Bucky released in 1976 on the United Artists label.

In 1976, Malo was the engineer on Weather Report's classic jazz fusion album Heavy Weather, released in 1977 and in 1979 the engineer and co-producer on Bruford's Gradually Going Tornado released in 1980.

Before Chess Records, Malo was a recording engineer for WJLB-AM in Detroit. During that time, he installed the first studio recording equipment (modest at the time) for Motown at 2648 W. Grand Blvd., Detroit.
