= Pitchblende (disambiguation) =

Pitchblende may refer to:

- Uraninite, a mineral used as a source of uranium
- Pitchblende (band), was a four-piece art-punk band from Washington, DC
- Pitche Blende (band), was an American garage rock, psychedelic, acid rock, and protopunk band formed in 1967 in Saginaw, Michigan
