= Central Park in the Dark =

Composition by Charles Ives

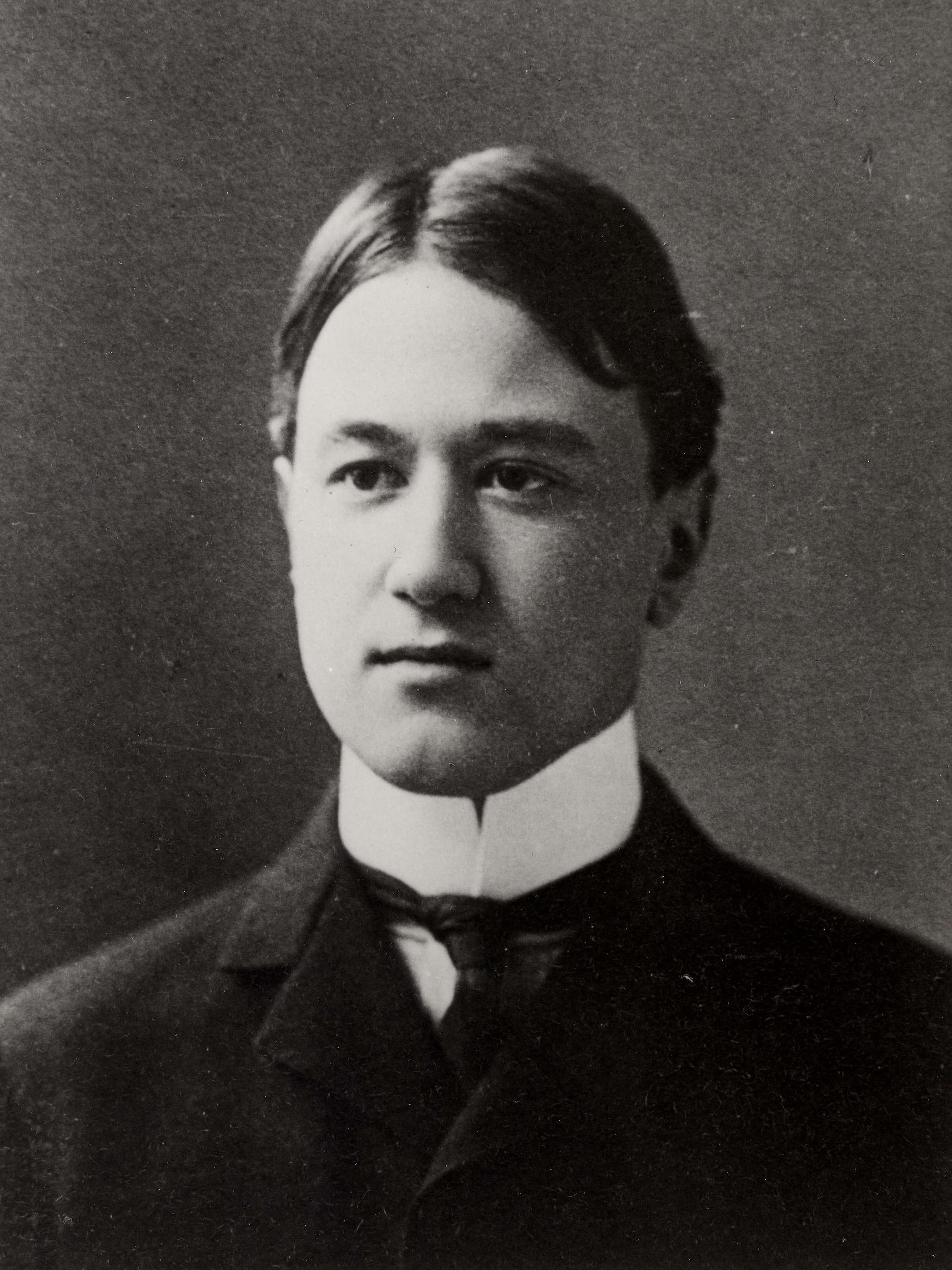
Charles Ives's graduation portrait from Yale University, c. June 1898

Central Park in the Dark is a musical composition by Charles Ives for chamber orchestra. It was composed in 1906 and has been paired with The Unanswered Question as part of "Two Contemplations" and with Hallowe'en and The Pond in "Three Outdoor Scenes".

== Composition ==
The piece was first titled A Contemplation of Nothing Serious or Central Park in the Dark in "The Good Old Summer Time" (in comparison to A Contemplation of a Serious Matter or The Unanswered Perennial Question). Ives wrote detailed notes concerning the purpose and context of Central Park in the Dark: This piece was composed in 1906.

This piece purports to be a picture-in-sounds of the sounds of nature and of happenings that men would hear some thirty or so years ago (before the combustion engine and radio monopolized the earth and air), when sitting on a bench in Central Park on a hot summer night.

The piece is scored for piccolo, flute, oboe, E♭ (B♭) clarinet, bassoon, trumpet, trombone, percussion, two pianos and strings. Ives specifically suggests the two pianos be a player-piano and a grand piano. The orchestral groups are to be separated spatially from each other. Ives described the role of the instruments in a programmatic description of the piece:

The strings represent the night sounds and silent darkness – interrupted by sounds from the Casino over the pond – of street singers coming up from the Circle singing, in spots, the tunes of those days – of some "night owls" from Healy's whistling the latest of the Freshman March – the "occasional elevated", a street parade, or a "break-down" in the distance – of newsboys crying "uxtries" – of pianolas having a ragtime war in the apartment house "over the garden wall", a street car and a street band join in the chorus – a fire engine, a cab horse runs away, lands "over the fence and out", the wayfarers shout – again the darkness is heard – an echo over the pond – and we walk home.

== Characteristics ==
Central Park in the Dark displays several characteristics that are typical of Ives's work. Ives layers orchestral textures on top of each other to create a polytonal atmosphere. Within this, Ives juxtaposes the different sections of the orchestras in contrasting and clashing pairings (e.g., the ambient, static strings against the syncopated ragtime pianos against a brass street band). These juxtapositions are a prevalent theme in the works of Ives, and can be seen most notably in The Unanswered Question, Three Places in New England, and the Symphony No. 4.

Ives uses quotation in Central Park in the Dark, using common themes from popular tunes of the day in his piece. He quotes the popular tune Hello! Ma Baby within the ragtime pianos and the Washington Post March within the street band.

Central Park in the Dark is clearly a programmatic work, as can be derived from Ives's own detailed narrative describing the piece. Ives's work often relies on programmatic/narrative themes, allowing him to provide guidance through his dense scores.

== Performance and recording ==
The first documented performance of the piece was in New York on May 11, 1946, by the chamber orchestra students from Juilliard Graduate School conducted by Theodore Bloomfield. It was performed at an all-Ives concert at the McMillin Theatre at Columbia University as part of the Second Annual Festival of Contemporary America Music. Ives, in a letter for Elliott Carter remembered a different initial performance. In relation to programs to be printed for the concert Ives wrote:

Though it is not an important matter, it would be well—unless the programs for the May concert are already printed—not to put as a first public performance the 'Central Park- some 40 years ago' as it was cut down some, in instrumentation, for a Theater Orchestra and played between acts in a downtown Theatre in N.Y. [Ives] doesn't remember the exact date or the name of the theater. There was no program, but he thinks it was in 1906 or '07. The players had a hard time with it—the piano player got mad, stopped in the middle and kicked the bass drum. However, don't put the above in the program—just omit 'First Performance'—as he feels, if not, it would be hardly fair to those old 'fellers' who stood up for a 'dangerous job.'

The piece was first recorded in 1951 by the Polymusic Chamber Orchestra, under the direction of Will Lorin by Polymusic and has since been recorded by many orchestral groups.

== Influence ==
In "An Ives Celebration: Papers and Panels of the Charles Ives Centennial Festival Conference", Hans G. Helms discussed the "strange historical coincidence" between Ives's Central Park in the Dark and Karlheinz Stockhausen's Gruppen for three orchestras. He found that after a performance of Central Park in the Dark by the West German Radio Symphony Orchestra, Stockhausen came out with Gruppen, which had very similar musical qualities to the Ives piece, such as independent lines represented through individual players and dividing the orchestra spatially. In their 2011 history of the mashup, The New York Times began with Central Park in the Dark, writing that it is "[c]onsidered to be the first sound collage".

In 1967, the pop group The Buckinghams recorded the song "Susan", and producer James William Guercio inserted an excerpt from Ives' Central Park in the Dark without informing the band beforehand.
