= Phil Orsi =

American singer

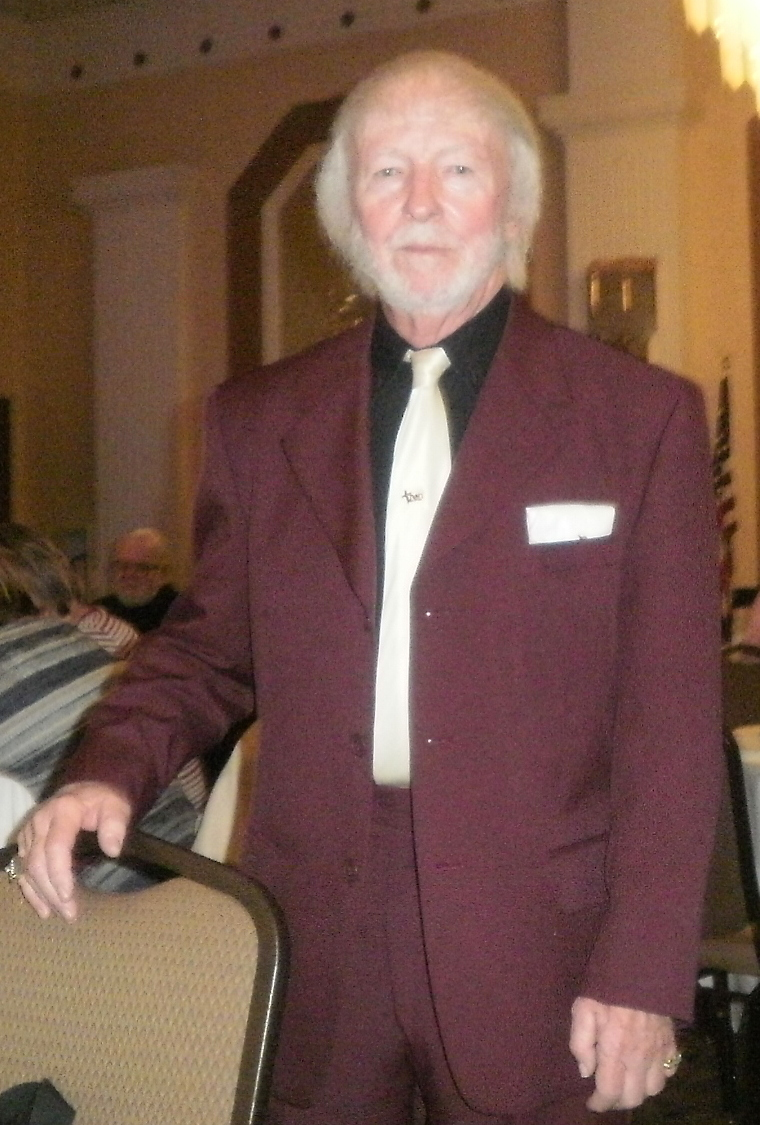
- Phil Orsi at the 2017 Orland Township Senior American Idol

Background information
- Born: June 14, 1939 (age 87); Chicago, Illinois, U.S.
- Genres: Pop, rock, funk, R&B
- Occupations: Singer-songwriter; musician; producer
- Instruments: Vocals, bass guitar, guitar
- Years active: 1962–present
- Labels: USA, Delaware, Sonic, Scarlott, Wise World, Ivanhoe, Blue Soul, Lucky, Banner, Troy

Phil Orsi (born June 14, 1939) is an American singer, songwriter, producer and musician.

== Early life ==
Orsi was born and grew up in Chicago, Illinois. His passion for music began with the gift of a small radio from his grandmother. Orsi's father owned an Italian food and liquor store on 26th and Princeton streets on the city's south side. In the early 1960s the neighborhoods were razed en masse so that construction of the Dan Ryan Expressway could begin. The family moved the business (Orsi & Sons) to a new location at 59 East 18th street. The store was nearby Chicago's "Record Row" on South Michigan Avenue. Musicians from studios such as Chess Records would stop by at Orsi & Sons for lunch. Young Phil Orsi soon became friends with Muddy Waters and Willie Dixon.

== Early career ==
Orsi started up his band Phil Orsi & The Little Kings in 1962. The original line-up consisted of John Jackson on horns, Clark Dufay on lead guitar, Steve Hamilton on drums and himself on bass guitar. They played many clubs, bars and halls in Chicago area and neighboring states. They recorded a number of singles on local Chicago labels such as USA Records. The name of the band came from the comic strip "The Little King" created by Otto Soglow. The band wore patches of the character on their band jackets.

The band's single "Sorry (I Ran All the Way Home)" was listed as one of Billboard's "Spotlights" in August 1966. The following year, the group recorded a Larry Nestor song "Loving on Borrowed Time" for the Wise World Record label, that Orsi founded with Otis Clay. The single became a Northern soul favorite in British dance clubs. Orsi met band manager and booking agent Carl Bonafede at the Vogue Ballroom in Chicago when Bonafede was first managing the Fabulous Centuries whose band members included Carl Giammarese and Nick Fortuna.

Orsi later had a band called the Uni-beats and recorded singles on local Chicago labels such as Scarlott Records. Later on he became part of local act The Thunderbirds. The group had releases on The Delaware and Ivanhoe labels, which were subdivisions of Mercury Records a Chicago- based recording label. The Thunderbirds (from Chicago) had a line-up of John Russo on drums, Coy Lowehorne on lead guitar, Ken Hoffman on keyboards, Cal Clemons on horns and Orsi on bass guitar.

Orsi later fronted a Chicago-area band called Happiness Is alongside Stan Tuma, Tony Pettinato, Jack Souligny, Larry Weimer Jim Beldo, Dino Day and Phil Orsi. They did shows with Chicago DJ, Dick Biondi, including a show at the Aire Crown Theater starring Andy Williams and Henry Mancini. Happiness Is also did shows with many big name acts including: The Coasters, The Platters, Chubby Checker, Bill Haley and The Comets and others. They were together for about seven years and played the Chicago club circuit and surrounding states. They recorded and released songs on the local Banner Records label in Chicago.

== Later career ==
Orsi still occasionally performs locally in the Chicago area with his band at music festivals, vintage automobile shows and village parks in the summertime and local halls and bowling alleys in the winter time. Since 2014, Orsi has annually in a senior competition to benefit deserving college students in the form of scholarships generated by audience contributions. The Orland Township Senior American Idol competition held annually in May of each year has provided charitable monies for college-bound students. He has finished in the top three finalists twice in these events. Friends and families of the competitors have a good time with the music and a good meal at the same time. The 2017 Orland Township Senior American Idol competition was held at Giorgio's Banquet Hall in Orland Park on Thursday evening May 4. Orsi performed the songs "More" in the first round; "She's a Lady" in the second round, and finally "Feeling Good" in the third round. Orsi became the 2018 Senior American Idol winner in early May 2018. The Orland Township Senior American Idol competition was held on May 3, 2018, at Georgios Banquets in Orland Hills.
