= Gary Beisbier =

American rock music songwriter and musician (b. 1945)

- Born: Gary D. Beisbier; July 3, 1945 (age 81); Aurora, Illinois, United States
- Genres: Soul, pop, rock, easy listening
- Instruments: tenor saxophone, alto saxophone, baritone saxophone, piano, organ, lead vocals, background vocals
- Years active: 1960–present
- Labels: Terry Records, Constellation, Cameo-Parkway Records, Mercury Records, Colossus Records, Polydor Records, Private Stock Records, Odyssey Records

Gary Duane Beisbier (born July 3, 1945) is an American rock music songwriter, arranger and musician who co-wrote hit songs for The Buckinghams. Gary is a founding member of the rhythm and blues horn rock band from Chicago, Illinois, The Mob.

== Early years ==
Gary grew up in a house surrounded by music. His sister played the flute, one of his brothers played trumpet while another older brother played guitar. In grade school, he took lessons on the clarinet and started doubling on saxophone in Junior High. Gary liked the good stuff in many genres, big band and small combo jazz, classical standards, pop, and musical theater.

Gary went to West Aurora High School in Illinois. During those high school years emerged the band “The Maybees”, his first exposure to playing rock ’n’ roll at the age of 15. They played many teen dances, called record hops at that time, and various other weekend engagements in the Chicago suburbs. By the time graduation rolled around the group had also released three 45s on Terry Records. Beisbier went on to college at Northern Illinois University where he was active in the music program.

== Career ==
Gary Beisbier and Jim Holvay co-wrote the hit songs Don't You Care, Hey Baby (They're Playing Our Song) and Susan for The Buckinghams in the late 1960s while they were in The Mob. The Mob played to packed venues and their showmanship and talent pleased the audiences to the limit. Gary was a multi-talented musician and played several different instruments in the Mob. He was the band's arranger for most of the charts and presentation of the Mob in concert. The songwriting team of Beisbier and Holvay produced two more top 100 Billboard-charting songs on the Colossus record label produced by Jerry Ross (record producer) in 1971. "I Dig Everything About You" peaked at #83 on the charts. It became a beach music classic. "Give It To Me" later charted at #71 on the Billboard top 100 chart.
