= Arthur's Tavern =

New York City nightclub

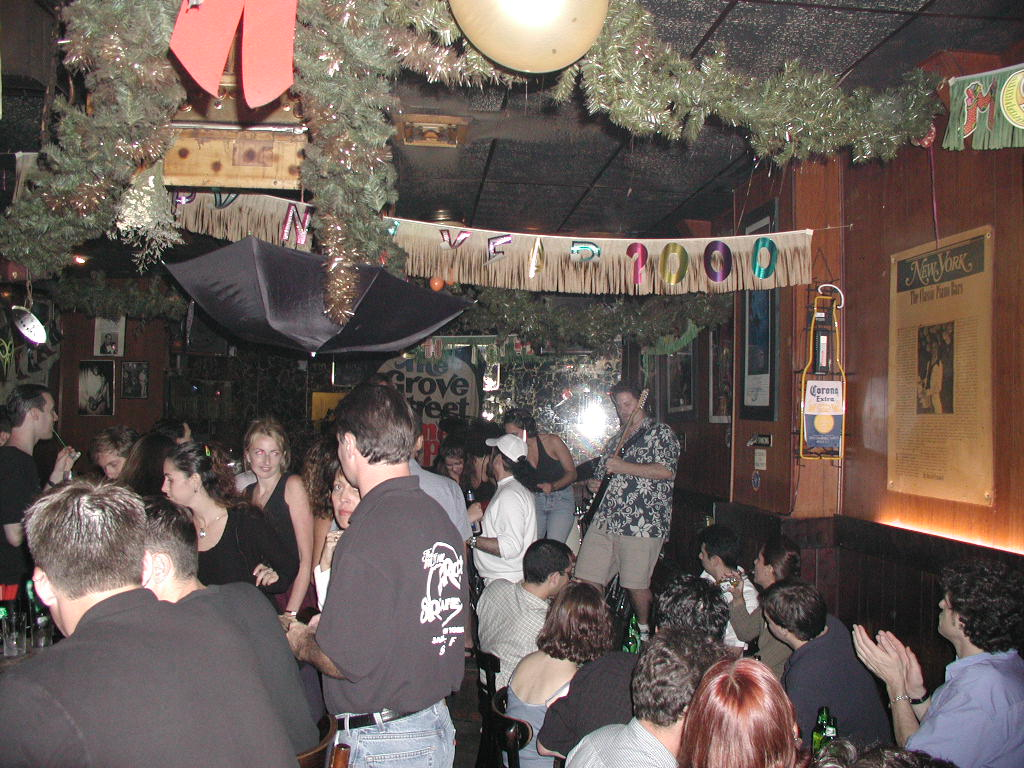
Inside Arthur's

Arthur's Tavern is a nightclub in the West Village, New York City. It has been located in a designated historic building for more than 60 years. Arthur's Tavern street address is 57 Grove Street (between 7th Avenue South and Bleecker Street).

Arthur's is a live jazz and blues club. It has hosted Charlie Parker and Roy Hargrove. Songwriters James Holvay and Gary Beisbier (who penned hit songs for the Buckinghams in the late 1960s) were part of a R & B band called The Chicagoans that played Arthur's Tavern in the fall of 1963.

In the 1970s, Arthur's Tavern was known for free admission and relatively inexpensive drinks.
