= Daughters of Eve (band) =

American garage rock band

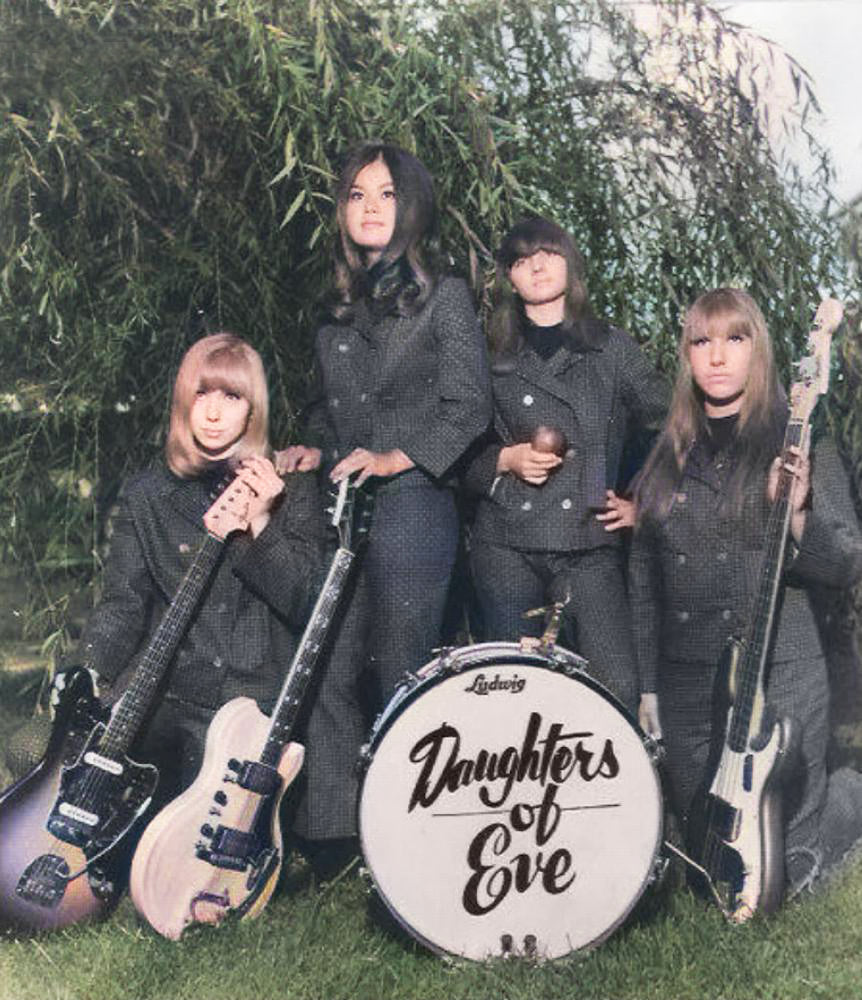
- Daughters of Eve, c. 1960s

Background information
- Origin: Chicago, Illinois, U.S.
- Genres: Garage rock; rock
- Years active: 1965–1968
- Labels: USA; Spectra Sound; Cadet
- Past members: Judy Johnson, lead guitar; Marsha Tomal, B-3 organ, rhythm guitar; Andrea Levin, bass guitar; Debi Pomeroy, drums; Marilou Davison, bass guitar; Lori Wax, bass guitar

Daughters of Eve were an American all-female garage rock band formed in Chicago, Illinois, in 1965. The group was formed and managed by Carl Bonafede, who was managing the Buckinghams as they were gaining national success. The Daughters of Eve is considered the first female rock band from Chicago, and the group released four singles during their existence, all produced by Bonafede, before disbanding in 1968.

== History ==
In late 1965, Carl Bonafede was seeking to form a sister group to accompany the Buckinghams. After several auditions, Bonafede rounded out the original lineup of singers and guitarists Judy Johnson and Marsha Tomal, bassist Andrea Levin, and drummer Debi Pomeroy. The bandmates were influenced by the male-dominated rock music scene of the period, and they strived to be the exception to the typical band standard. They chose the local Senn High School as their launching point to attract a local following. Bonafede quickly arranged several gigs for the group he gimmicked with matching outfits to make them more notable. Pomeroy became the early centerpiece of the group's sound for her standout performance at the drums for their act.

The band soon gained a considerable following of both male and female fans. As Levin stated, regarding the audience, "We had a good sound and good energy, and the audience was always very receptive, just thrilled. I never felt like anyone was looking at us going 'Oh my god, who do they think they are?' It was like, 'Wow, you guys are great, and you're girls!'". Once the band became well known in Chicago, they began touring within the Midwest, and opened for contemporaries in the Chicago rock scene like the Shadows of Knight, the Cryan' Shames, and the Buckinghams. Since the bandmates were under the age of 16, many of the clubs they performed in required adult supervision and forbidding them to sit outside the stage. The first non-ballroom performance by the band was in February 1966 at the annual Chicago Auto Show held in the McCormick Place by Chicago's lakefront. The band was featured as a backing band in local programming with Janis Ian to support the release of her song "Society's Child". In 1966, the band signed a contract with USA Records to produce their first single "Hey Lover" b/w "Stand by Me" and their second one, "Symphony of My Soul" b/w "Help Me, Boy". They both failed to chart nationally, but it became a popular release in the Chicago area that they would tour to promote. For their next releases, the band changed bass players, first with Marilou Davidson and then Lori Wax.

Their third single, "Don't Waste My Time" b/w "He Cried" was released on the Spectra Sound label in 1967, and their final single, "Social Tragedy" b/w "A Thousand Stars" on the Cadet label in 1968. "Social Tragedy" featured vocal harmonies conducted by Tomal and Johnson. The releases showed the band's sound from garage rock to psychedelic rock influences. They still held the status as a popular regional act, but by the end of 1968, the group disbanded after Tomal was wedded and Johnson followed suit soon after.

== Singles ==
- "Hey Lover" b/w "Stand by Me" - U.S.A. Records 1966
- "Symphony of My Soul" b/w "Help Me Boy" - U.S.A. Records 1967
- "Don't Waste My Time" b/w "He Cried" - Spectra Sound 1967
- "Social Tragedy" b/w "A Thousand Stars" - Cadet 1968
