= Indigo Records =

American pop record label

- Indigo Records logo
- Founded: 1960
- Founder: Don Wayne, Vic Gargano
- Defunct: 1962
- Status: Inactive
- Genre: Pop
- Country of origin: U.S.
- Location: Hollywood, California

Indigo Records was an American pop record label formed in 1960. Within two years the label issued nearly 50 singles and five LPs.

== Origin ==
Indigo Records was formed in Hollywood, California, in September 1960, by record promoters and producers Don Wayne and Vic Gargano. The year before, the two had entered the record business by partnering to form Inferno Records, which issued only a few releases. Gargano then formed Indigo as a pop label. Artist promoter and manager Jim Lee was brought on as head of A&R.

== The Innocents ==
One of the label's earliest and most successful acts was the Innocents, a vocal trio from the Los Angeles neighborhood of Sun Valley. Starting out as the Echoes, they had been signed by Herb Alpert to Andex Records, where they recorded a couple of tracks. After more rehearsals, the Innocents took their composition "Honest I Do" to Kim Fowley and Gary Paxton at American Studios, who recorded it and sold the master to Indigo. A&R Director Jim Lee signed the group to a record deal and personal management.

In October 1960, "Honest I Do" reached number 1 on the record charts in Los Angeles, and number 28 nationally. In January 1961, the group's follow-up single, "Gee Whiz", also reached the number 28 position on the national charts.

== Kathy Young ==
Indigo A&R Director Jim Lee discovered Kathy Young while managing a personal appearance by the Innocents at the Pacific Ocean Park amusement pier in Santa Monica. He handed her a song written in 1953 by Gene Pearson and recorded by his group, the Rivileers, titled "A Thousand Stars". During the recording session, the Innocents joined Young in what was described as completely impromptu and unplanned harmonizing. "A Thousand Stars", released as performed by "Kathy Young with The Innocents", reached number 3 on the Billboard Hot 100 in December 1960, behind Elvis Presley's "Are You Lonesome Tonight?" and Floyd Cramer's "Last Date".

Young's follow-up, "Happy Birthday Blues", peaked at No. 30 on the Hot 100 in 1961. Subsequent singles, such as "Magic Is the Night" and "The Great Pretender", failed to chart in the Top 40.

== Decline ==
Despite the successes of the Innocents and Kathy Young, and the release of singles and albums by other artists signed to the label, Indigo overextended itself financially, and shut down in the fall of 1962.

In 1963, Don Wayne took a temporary position as road manager for the Everly Brothers, on a two-week tour of Canada. He stayed with them nine years.

Vic Gargano remained in the record business, forming several successor labels: Magenta, Lavender, Invicta, Condor, and Blue Fin. "In 1974 he trotted Indigo out for one final run, briefly managing and producing Chameleon, a two husband and wife quartet billed as the 'American Abba,'" and had retired by the early 1980s. He died in August 2004.

Seeing the handwriting on the wall, Jim Lee left in the fall of 1961. He founded Monogram Records where, in addition to continuing to produce records for Kathy Young, he discovered and produced records for Chris Montez.

== Legacy ==
Indigo artists' contributions to the pop music scene have endured in the decades since their original release.

The Innocents' sessions were compiled by Ace Records in a 25-track CD titled "The Innocents: The Complete Indigo Recordings," released in 1992.

Kathy Young's recordings were compiled by Crystal Ball Records in a 24-track CD titled "A Thousand Stars," released in 2014.

== Select singles ==
Artist	Title(s)	Catalog No.	Year
The Innocents	Honest I Do	IND-105	1960
Kathy Young With The Innocents	A Thousand Stars / Eddie My Darling	IND-108	1960
The Innocents	Gee Whiz	IND-111	1960
The Crystals	Dreams And Wishes / Mr. Brush ?	IND-114	1961
Kathy Young With The Innocents	Happy Birthday Blues	IND-115	1961
The Innocents	Kathy / In The Beginning	IND-116	1961
Pat Zill	Pick Me Up On Your Way Down / La Mirada ?	IND-119	1961
Kathy Young With The Innocents	Just As Though You Were Here	IND-121	1961
Kathy Young With The Innocents	Magic Is The Night	IND-125	1961
Pat Zill	Bouquet Of Roses / Hold Tight	IND-126	1961
Jody Reynolds And The Storms	Thunder / Tarantula ?	IND-127	1961
The Innocents	Donna	IND-128	1961
The Innocents	Pains In My Heart	IND-132	1961
Flash Terry	Cool It / Her Name Is Lou	IND-135	1961
Kathy Young With The Innocents	Great Pretender / Baby Oh Baby	IND-137	1961
Frankie Erwin	Detour	IND-138	1961
Little Mojo	Mojo Theme	IND-139	1962
Daddy Dewdrop And The Sugar Plum Sassafrass Bubble Gum Band	Here Come The Judge	IND-4444	1968
Cleaveland Jones	Loreen / In Spite of Myself	IND-4445	1968

== Select albums ==
- The Bob Rogers Orchestra All That And This Too GBM-1501A 1961
- Los Camperos Puro Mariachi IND-LP-501 1961
- Cy Coleman Selections from 'Wildcat' GBM-502/GBST-502 1961
- The Innocents Innocently Yours IND-LP-503 1961
- Kathy Young With The Innocents The Sound Of Kathy Young IND-LP-504 1961

Source: http://www.bsnpubs.com/la/indigo/indigo.html
