= Laurie Beebe Lewis =

American singer-songwriter (born 1954)

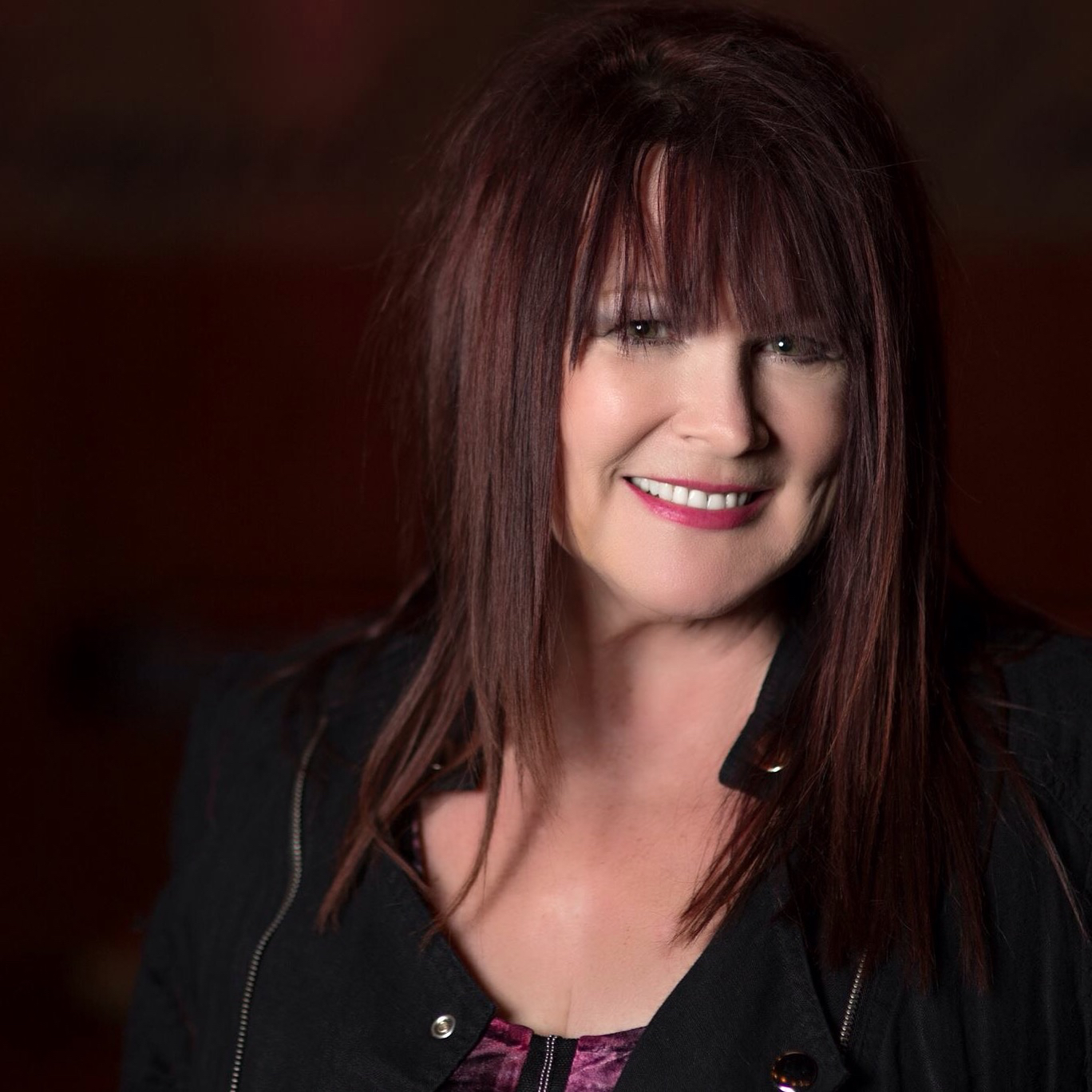
- Laurie Beebe Lewis in San Diego, 2016

Background information
- Born: Laurie Seaman; November 5, 1954 (age 71); Ludington, Michigan, U.S.
- Website: lauriesmusic.com

Laurie Beebe Lewis (born Laurie Seaman; November 5, 1954, Ludington, Michigan) is an American singer-songwriter. At age 14 she was the female lead singer of the Saginaw, Michigan cult-underground band Pitche Blende, a featured band on The Michigan Mixture Volume 1 album. She is most associated with her affiliation as the keyboard player and vocalist with Chicago's reformed group The Buckinghams from 1982 to 1985; and as lead singer in the reformed group The Mamas & The Papas from 1986 to 1993 with original members John Phillips and Denny Doherty, along with Spanky McFarlane.

Lewis was the only female artist on the 1985 Happy Together Tour with The Buckinghams, the Turtles, Gary Lewis & the Playboys, and the Grass Roots. That same year the Buckinghams recorded their 1985 come-back album entitled A Matter Of Time to which Lewis contributed lead and back-up vocals as well as co-writing the song "Made To Love You". Meanwhile, in 1997 she recorded with singer Gary Puckett on his album Is This Love. The album was released in Canada and Europe with tracks later released on compilation albums Timepiece and This is Love, both of which feature a power duet of Puckett and Lewis covering the Heart (band) ballad "Alone".

In 2013 Lewis was part of the all-star musical project Dick Wagner & the Rockers for St. Jude in which she shared lead vocals with Wagner, Mark Farner (Grand Funk Railroad), Jean Beauvoir, Merrilee Rush, and Trini Lopez, in a band that included drummer Danny Seraphine (Chicago), guitarists Jennifer Batten (Michael Jackson) and Elliot Easton (The Cars), as well as bassist Lee Sklar and a huge backing choir of well known musicians. The group recorded a digital single and a music video, "If I Had The Time (I Could Change The World)" with proceeds earmarked to benefit St. Jude Children’s Research Hospital.

Lewis was also featured on the 2nd Annual 2016 Dick Wagner Memorial Concert 'Remember The Child" at The Fillmore Detroit. The show honored DJ Russ Gibb, a former concert promoter and media personality from Dearborn, Michigan, and commemorated the late guitarist and singer-songwriter Dick Wagner. Wagner's music was performed by many artists including Wagner's son Robert Wagner, Jean Beauvoir, Sandy Gennaro, Micki Free, Derek St. Holmes, Jimmie "Bones" Trombly, Peter Keys, Muruga Booker, Dennis Dunaway, The Frost, Johnny "Bee" Badanjek, and other supporting musicians. Proceeds benefited Children's Miracle Network Hospitals supporting music therapy.

On March 24, 2017, Lewis performed with Suzi Quatro as one of The Pleasure Seekers, along with the latter's sister Patti Quatro, on the third annual "Remember the Child Concert" held in Detroit, Michigan at the MotorCity Casino Hotel in The Sound Board performance venue. She also contributed backing vocals for Mark Farner, Kip Winger and many returning artists from the previous year.

== Partial discography ==
This is a partial discography on which Laurie Beebe Lewis contributes vocals or instrumentation:

=== Albums ===
Solo

- 1997 - Laurie K. Lewis - Cool Waters - (Remnant Records 13776-0)
- 2017 - Laurie Beebe Lewis - Baby Birds Produced by Warren Huart (Play Like A Girl Records 247562)

With Bands

- 1985 - The Buckinghams - A Matter Of Time - (Red Label ST-73101)
- 1997 - Gary Puckett - Is This Love - (Juslor Records CL10097JT)
- 1998 - Gary Puckett - Timepiece - (Polytel 740051-4)
- 2011 - Queen Divas of The Universe - All Wrapped Up In Christmas (Remnant Records 91262-5) features Roni Lee, Shaaron Schuemaker
- 2020 - The Original Starfires - Fly Me Away (Pacific Records PAC 101720)

=== Singles ===
- 1968 - Pitche Blende - "My World has Stopped" b/w "Stop" (Valley 1102)
- 1985 - The Buckinghams - "Veronica" b/w "Veronica" - (Red Label PB-71001) promo - both sides stereo
- 2013 - Dick Wagner And The Rockers - "If I Had The Time (I Could Change The World)" (Desert Dream Productions) shares lead vocals with Jean Beauvoir, Mark Farner, Merrilee Rush, Trini Lopez. Digital release

=== Compilation albums ===
- 1990 - Michigan Mixture Volume 1 - (Clinging Hysteria CHR1) includes Pitche Blend "My World has Stopped"
- 1999 Oasis Christmas 2 God Rest Ye Merry Gentlemen track 2
- 2012 - Michigan Mixture Volume 1 (Spiral Groove – SGLP3010) Reissue. Includes Pitche Blend's "My World has Stopped" and "Stop"
- 2020 - Power Chords, Harmonies and Mistletoe III (Snap!! Records - FUNCD-065) Includes Queen Divas of the Universe's "Hark, The Herald Angels Sing"
- 2021 - Staring at the Sun XIII (Blindspot Records 157) Includes The Original Starfires "Fly Me Away"

=== Album contributions ===
- 1974 - The Celebration Road Show - Amazing Grace - (Celebration Records 4042)
- 1975 - The Celebration Road Show - Songs of Freedom - (United Church Press, Philadelphia PA AM367)
- 1976 - The Celebration Road Show - That's A Plenty - (Celebration Records CR1005)
- 1977 - Gary Miller's Celebration Road Show LIVE ON STAGE (Circle Records CLP-2 PRP-45101)
- 1999 - "Oasis Christmas 2" With Gary Puckett & The Union Gap All Through The Night The Livingstones Hark The Herald Angels Sing backing vocals with Jeremy Camp
- 2000 - Personal Praise & Worship - Adventures In God's Presence Collections Volume 6 - (Rolltop Music - 777-6-D)
- 2007 - Leigh Taylor & Adventures Worship Band - Songs For Every Tribe - (Rolltop Music - 777-7D)
- 2015 - Roni Lee - Heroes (Play Like A Girl Records)
