= Kind of a Drag =

Single by The Buckinghams

from the album Kind of a Drag
- B-side: "You Make Me Feel So Good"
- Released: December 1966
- Genre: Pop
- Length: 2:05
- Label: USA Records
- Songwriter: Jim Holvay
- Producers: Carl Bonafede, Dan Belloc

The Buckinghams singles chronology
"Kind of a Drag" (1966)	"Don't You Care" (1967)

"Kind of a Drag" is a song written by Jim Holvay and recorded by the Buckinghams. It was the title track of their debut LP. The single reached number one on the U.S. Hot 100 in February 1967, becoming the first number-one single in the new calendar year, remaining in the top position for two weeks, earning a gold disc.

It was the first of the band's three top-10 hits in 1967, among five total top-40 hits for that year. Holvay was Chicago-based and had been performing with a group called the Mob.

The co-producers of "Kind of a Drag" were the band's first personal manager Carl Bonafede and big-band leader Dan Belloc, owner of the Holiday Ballroom in Chicago. The arranger of the horn sound was Frank Tesinsky. The engineer at the first recording sessions held at Chess Records in Chicago was Ron Malo, who also mixed the final recording. The producers wanted to speed up the tempo of the final release. Ron Malo had the ability to do that, according to lead guitar player Carl Giammarese; Malo was able to keep "Kind of a Drag" in the key of G. Following this, the band's debut album, also entitled Kind of a Drag, was released and featured the band's early recordings.

== Chart performance ==
=== Weekly charts ===
Chart (1966–1967)	Peak position
Australia	18
Canada RPM Top Singles	1
New Zealand (Listener)	16
South Africa (Springbok Radio)	19
U.S. Billboard Hot 100	1
U.S. Cash Box Top 100	3

=== Year-end charts ===
Chart (1967)	Rank
Canada	10
U.S. Billboard Hot 100	16
U.S. Cash Box	18
