= William Butts Mershon =

- Born: January 16, 1856; Saginaw, Michigan, U.S.
- Died: July 12, 1943

William Butts Mershon (January 16, 1856 – July 12, 1943) was an American author and businessman. He led a number of businesses and served as Mayor of Saginaw, Michigan.

== Biography ==
Mershon was born on January 16, 1856, to Augustus Hull Mershon and his wife Helen (born Johnson). Mersom started the William B. Mershon and Company in Saginaw that manufactured bandsaw blades which his father was attributed with inventing. Mershon was a member of the national guard, the parks and recreation committee and was mayor of Saginaw in 1894/5. For two years he was a state forester and he was an associate life member of the American Ornithologists' Union and here his interests enabled him to gather together the material from a number of sources to publish a volume on the passenger pigeon in 1907. The book on the passenger pigeon was published several years after the last of this once endemic bird was last killed (in 1900) and before the last died in captivity in an American zoo. In 1909, the American Ornithologist's Union offered a prize for any wild bird or nest found but to no avail. The book contains contributions by a number of writers.

He wrote in his 1927 autobiographical memoir, “Recollections of My Fifty Years Hunting and Fishing,” fate intervened when he received his first gun – a sixteen gauge muzzle loader – around the age of ten. From then on his happiest moments were spent in the field hunting and fishing. His memoir is organized by animal rather than by biographical episode (e.g. “The Michigan Wild Turkey,” and “Salmon Fishing,” etc.)

Merson kept two huts, one local and another in Canada. His visits to each of these annually with his friends was the basis of his second book.

He was a member of Michigan's tax commission in 1912.

Mershon had married Catherine Morse from Detroit in 1889, and they had three sons, William Briggs, Edward Lowery, and John Morle, and two daughters. His papers were given to the state in 1944 and consist of over 40 feet of material.

== Works ==
- The Passenger Pigeon (1907)
- Recollections of My Fifty Years Hunting and Fishing (1923)
