= The Innocents (US band) =

American pop group

- Also known as: The Echoes
- Origin: Los Angeles, California, U.S.
- Genres: Doo-wop; pop
- Years active: 1958–1964; 1990s
- Labels: Andex Records; Indigo Records
- Past members: Jim West; Darron Stankey; Al Candelaria

The Innocents were an American pop group from Sun Valley, California, United States. The trio existed primarily between 1958 and 1964, although they did reform in the 1990s.

== Career ==
The members of the group grew up in the same neighborhood and attended the same schools. They shared a love for harmony and music in general. They were discovered and signed to a contract with Andex Records by Herb Alpert, where they recorded under the name The Echoes.

After leaving Andex Records they changed their name and signed with Indigo Records as The Innocents. The trio were all members of a car club named The Innocents, hence the name of the group. Their first Indigo hit single, "Honest I Do," was released in 1960. It was produced by Gary Paxton. The record hit No. 28 on the Billboard Hot 100 in October 1960. "Honest I Do" was followed by "Gee Whiz" (a different composition than the popular Carla Thomas hit), which also topped out at No. 28 in January 1961. The 1961 album release, Innocently Yours, featured the trio staring out through prison bars. This cover is featured in the book, 1000 Album Covers. (Taschen)

At this time a new, young female singer named Kathy Young was signed to the Indigo label; the Innocents were asked to provide the background vocals for her recordings. The label used The Innocents' photos and name to gain publicity and thereby airplay for the Kathy Young singles. "A Thousand Stars" and others were released as by "Kathy Young with The Innocents." "A Thousand Stars" became a hit, reaching No. 3 on the Billboard Hot 100 in December 1960.

In June 1961, the British music magazine, NME, reported that the Innocents were part of Alan Freed's road show, that also included Brenda Lee, The Shirelles, Bobby Vee, Etta James, Gene McDaniels, The Ventures, Clarence "Frogman" Henry, The Fleetwoods, Kathy Young, and Jerry Lee Lewis. The Innocents released seven singles after "Gee Whiz" on Trans World Records, Reprise, Decca, and Warner, but none of them charted. Yet the group continued to score hits backing up Kathy Young.

The group disbanded in 1964. James West went on as a solo artist, and owner of an upscale Arts and Crafts store on Melrose in Hollywood for years; Al Candelaria became a session musician. The group reunited in the 1990s for reunion shows.

== Members ==
- James West – First tenor, lead vocals
- Darron Stankey – Second tenor
- Al Candelaria – Baritone

== Discography ==
=== Albums ===
| Year | Album | U.S. label |
|---|---|---|
| 1961 | Innocently Yours | Indigo Records |

=== Singles ===
| Year | Single | U.S. label | Billboard Hot 100 |
|---|---|---|---|
| 1959 | "Dee-Dee-Di-Oh" (as The Echoes) | Andex 22102 | – |
| 1960 | "Tick Tock / The Rat" | Trans World 7001 | – |
| 1960 | "Honest I Do / My Baby Hully Gullys" | Indigo 105 | 28 |
| 1960 | "Gee Whiz / Please Mr. Sun" | Indigo 111 | 28 |
| 1961 | "Kathy / In the Beginning" | Indigo 116 | – |
| 1961 | "Beware / Because I Love You So" | Indigo 124 | – |
| 1961 | "Donna / You Got Me Goin'" | Indigo 128 | – |
| 1961 | "Pains in My Heart / When I Become a Man" | Indigo 132 | – |
| 1962 | "Time / Dee Dee Di Oh" | Indigo 141 | – |
| 1962 | "Oh How I Miss My Baby / Be Mine" | Reprise 20112 | – |
| 1963 | "Oh How I Miss My Baby / You're Never Satisfied" | Reprise 201125 | – |
| 1963 | "Come On Lover / Don't Cry" | Decca 31519 | – |
