= A Thousand Stars =

- Japanese release picture sleeve

Single by Kathy Young with the Innocents

from the album The Sound of Kathy Young
- B-side: "Eddie My Darling"
- Released: September 1960
- Genre: Pop
- Length: 2:48
- Label: Indigo
- Songwriter: Eugene Pearson
- Producer: James Lee

Kathy Young with the Innocents singles chronology
| "A Thousand Stars" (1960) | "Happy Birthday Blues" (1961) |

"A Thousand Stars" is a song written by Eugene Pearson and performed by Kathy Young and the Innocents.

The song was produced and arranged by James Lee, and was featured on her 1961 album The Sound of Kathy Young.

== Background ==
Sandy Nelson played drums on the record.

== Chart performance ==
"A Thousand Stars" reached number 3 on the Billboard Hot 100 and number 6 on the R&B chart in 1960.

== Other versions ==
- The original version was made by Rivileers in 1954, who enjoyed a short (less than two years) recording career from 1954 to 1955. The Rivileers most stable lineup consisted of neighborhood and high school buds: Eugene Pearson, Milton Edwards, Earl Lennard, Herb Crosby, and Alphonso Delaney.
- Billy Fury released a version of the song as a single that reached No. 14 on the UK Singles Chart in January 1961.
- Linda Scott released a version of the song on her 1961 album Starlight, Starbright.
- The Daughters of Eve released a version of the song as the B-side to their 1968 single "Social Tragedy".
- Canadian rock band the Guess Who performed the song live in Mobile, Alabama, on August 14, 1971.

== In media ==
- Billy Fury's re-recorded version was included on the soundtrack to the 1973 film That'll Be the Day.
