= James William Guercio =

American music producer and film director

- Born: July 18, 1945 (age 81); Chicago, Illinois, U.S.
- Other name: Jimmy Guercio
- Occupations: Music producer; songwriter; movie producer; director
- Spouse: Lucy Angle Guercio
- Children: 3
- Parent(s): Grace Guercio (1923–2010); James Guercio, Sr. (1920–1998)

James William Guercio (born July 18, 1945) is an American music producer, musician, songwriter and director. He is best known for his work as the producer of Chicago's first eleven albums. He also produced the early recordings of The Buckinghams and Blood, Sweat & Tears. In the mid-1970s, he managed the Beach Boys and was a member of their backing band. Guercio has also worked in the motion picture industry as a producer and director. He is married to the former model Lucy Angle.

== Early life and career ==
Guercio was born on July 18, 1945, in Chicago, Illinois, to James Guercio, Sr (1922-1998) and Grace Guercio (née Williams, 1923 – 2010). He is of Italian, German, Irish, Scottish, and English descent. He has four brothers and two sisters. As a child, he was friends with future Styx keyboardist and vocalist Dennis DeYoung.

In the 1960s, Guercio moved to Los Angeles and began working as a session musician and songwriter. He played on several recordings, wrote Chad & Jeremy's 1966 Top 30 pop hit "Distant Shores", and is listed as a "contributor" to Frank Zappa's 1966 debut album Freak Out! having briefly been a member of the Mothers of Invention. Guercio was hired by Columbia Records as a staff producer, and in 1967 he worked with The Buckinghams as producer of the singles "Don't You Care," "Mercy, Mercy, Mercy", "Hey Baby (They're Playing Our Song)" and "Susan".

Guercio attended DePaul University, where he was a friend of woodwind musician Walter Parazaider. Parazaider invited Guercio to hear his new band, The Big Thing, and Guercio offered to manage and produce them. In 1968 he relocated the band to Los Angeles and convinced them to change their name to The Chicago Transit Authority. While recording their first album for CBS/Columbia, Guercio was also approached about producing a second album for Blood, Sweat & Tears. Both albums were released in 1969 and Blood, Sweat & Tears won Guercio an Album of the Year Grammy Award.

In 1969, Guercio shortened The Chicago Transit Authority's name to Chicago and worked with them on a second album, Chicago II. The band became a commercial success and Guercio produced eleven more of their albums, including five number 1 pop albums, starting with Chicago V, and 17 Top 25 singles.

In 1969, he met street poet and musician Moondog and produced two albums for him, and also performed vocals with Moondog and his daughter. In November 1969, Guercio produced the Firesign Theatre's single, "Station Break." In April 1970, he produced the "Shoes for Industry" segment of their LP Don't Crush That Dwarf, Hand Me the Pliers. Both Dwarf and Firesign's earlier How Can You Be in Two Places at Once When You're Not Anywhere at All were labelled "Poseidon Productions: A Division of James William Guercio Enterprises Inc." Guercio joined The Beach Boys in the mid-1970s as their manager and played bass for them in live shows, before returning to work with Chicago. In 1976, Guercio earned two Grammy Awards for Chicago's single "If You Leave Me Now."

In 1977, Guercio and Chicago parted ways after the band discovered that his contract was paying him 51% of profits, with the other 49% shared between the eight band members. In the CNN biography "Now More Than Ever: The History of Chicago", the group revealed that "millions of dollars" had gone to Guercio while he was their manager. He has also been accused of mismanagement by Chicago, having been found to have pocketed royalty payments for most of the band's tenure.

== Other projects ==
Guercio directed and produced the 1973 film Electra Glide in Blue. The film starred Robert Blake and featured Peter Cetera and other members of Chicago in bit parts. The film was well received by critics and won the Palme d'or at the Cannes festival. He also produced the 1981 Robert Blake film Second-Hand Hearts.

Guercio founded Caribou Ranch, a recording studio in Colorado. The first radio hit recorded at Caribou was Joe Walsh's "Rocky Mountain Way." In addition to Chicago (starting with Chicago VI), the studio has been used by numerous other artists, including Elton John (for his Caribou album as well as Captain Fantastic and the Brown Dirt Cowboy and Rock of the Westies), Dan Fogelberg, Return to Forever, Billy Joel, Rod Stewart, Carole King, Stephen Stills, Waylon Jennings, Amy Grant, Supertramp, Badfinger and The Beach Boys. In March 1985 the studio complex was shut down after a fire destroyed the control room and caused about $3 million of damage.

In addition to the recording studio, Guercio also founded a record label, Caribou Records, which released albums by the Beach Boys, Carl Wilson, Dennis Wilson, the L.A. Express and a few other artists.

In 1978, the Caribou Ranch lent its name to a pro soccer team, the Colorado Caribous of the North American Soccer League. Co-owned by Guercio and future Washington state governor Booth Gardner, the Caribous finished in last place, drew poor crowds at Mile High Stadium, and wore uniforms that were ridiculed by numerous observers (brown and tan, with a strip of leather fringe across the chest). After the 1978 season, Guercio and Booth sold the club to interests in Atlanta who renamed them the Atlanta Chiefs.

After the split-up with Chicago and the Caribou Ranch fire, Guercio pursued a career in cattle ranching, property development, oil and gas exploration, drilling, and production, particularly coalbed methane wells. In the late 1980s, he purchased the Country Music Television (CMT) channel. In the early 1990s he sold CMT to media tycoon Ed Gaylord and Westinghouse Broadcasting.
