= Caribou Records discography =

This is a discography of Caribou Records releases.

== Albums ==
Artist	Album	Country	Year	Catalog #	Format
The Beach Boys	L.A. (Light Album)	US	1979	JZ 35752	LP
The Beach Boys	L.A. (Light Album)	US	1989	ZK 35752	CD
The Beach Boys	Keepin' the Summer Alive	US	1980	FZ 36293	LP
The Beach Boys	Keepin' the Summer Alive	US	1991	ZK 36293	CD
The Beach Boys	Ten Years of Harmony	US	1981	Z2X 37445	2LP
The Beach Boys	Ten Years of Harmony	US	1988	Z2K 37445	2CD
The Beach Boys	The Beach Boys	US	1985	BFZ 39946	LP
The Beach Boys	The Beach Boys	US	1985	ZK 39946	CD
Carl Wilson	Carl Wilson	US	1981	NJZ 37010	LP
Carl Wilson	Carl Wilson	Japan	1991	SRCS 6102	CD
Carl Wilson	Youngblood	US	1983	BFZ 37970	LP
Carl Wilson	Youngblood	Japan	1991	SRCS 6103	CD
Dennis Wilson	Pacific Ocean Blue	US	1977	PZ 34354	LP
Dennis Wilson	Pacific Ocean Blue	US	1991	ZK 34354	CD
Dennis Wilson	Pacific Ocean Blue	US	2008	CD: 88697339322 LP: SUZ5212.1	CD/LP
Gerard McMahon	Gerard	US	1976	PZ 34038	LP
L.A. Express	The L.A. Express	US	1976	PZ 33940	LP
L.A. Express	Shadow Play	US	1976	PZ 34355	LP
Lake	Ouch!	US	1980	JZ 37083	LP
Matthew Moore	Winged Horses	US	1978	JZ 35611	LP
Matthew Moore	The Sport Of Guessing	US	1979	JZ 36118	LP
O.C. Smith	Together	US	1977	PZ 34471	LP
James Vincent	Space Traveler	US	1976	PZ 34237	LP
James Vincent	Waiting for the Rain	US	1978	JZ 34899	LP
