= Kathy Young =

American singer (born 1945)

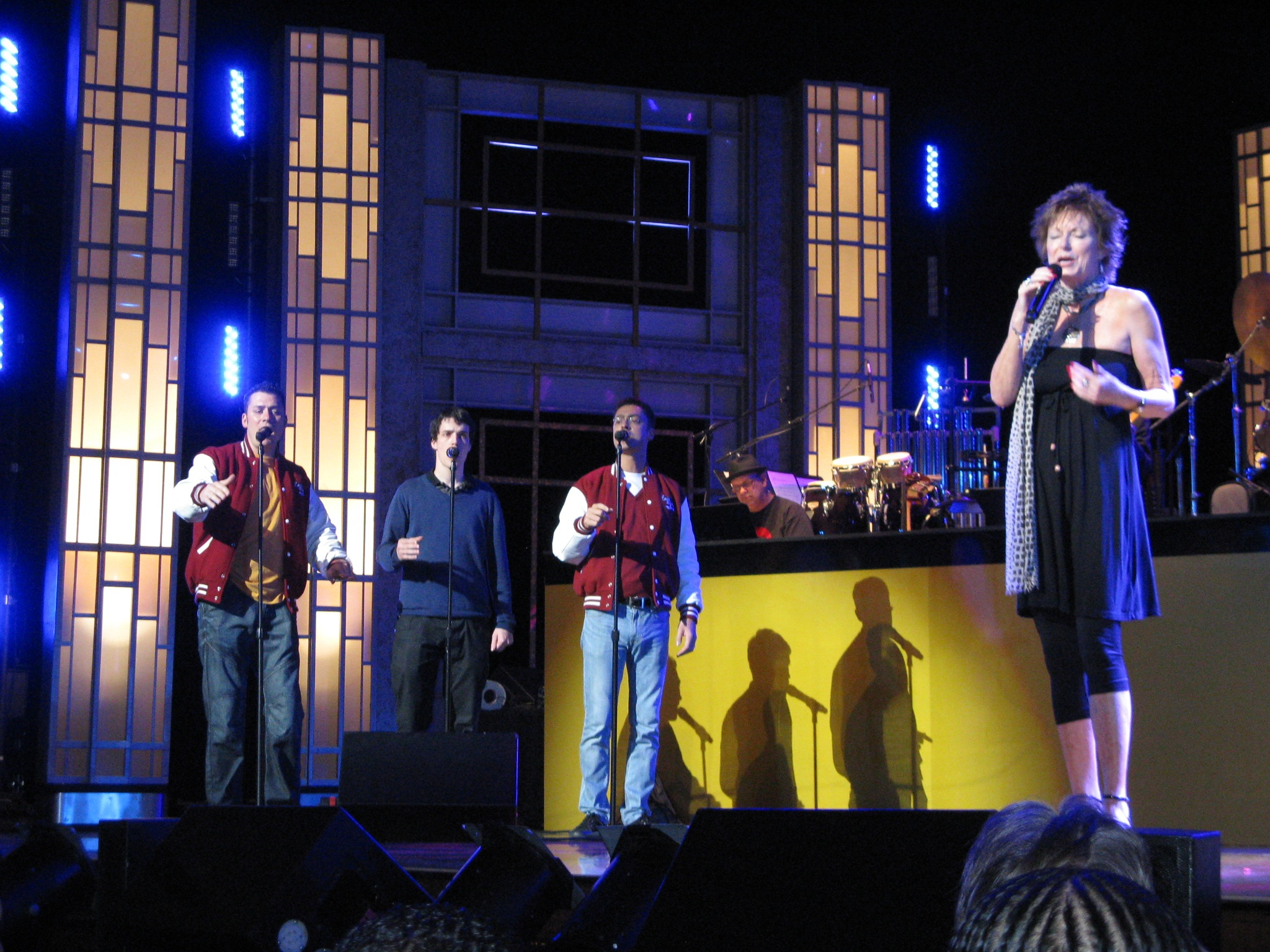
- Kathy Young with the Earth Angels performing at the Benedum Center for the Performing Arts in Pittsburgh, Pennsylvania, May 2010

Background information
- Born: 21 October 1945 (age 81); Santa Ana, California, United States
- Genre: Teen pop
- Occupation: Singer
- Instrument: Vocals
- Years active: Early 1960 - present
- Labels: Indigo, Monogram, Starfire
- Spouse: John Maus (1965-1968)
- Website: http://kathyyoung.com/

Kathy Young (born October 21, 1945) is an American musician; she was a teen pop singer during the early 1960s, whose rendition of "A Thousand Stars", at age 15, rose to number three on the Billboard Hot 100.

== Biography ==
Young was born in Santa Ana, California. She rose to stardom in 1960, when producer Jim Lee of Indigo Records chose a Sun Valley-based band, the Innocents, to sing back-up vocals for her on a cover version of the Rivileers' 1954 recording of "A Thousand Stars". Two years earlier, Lee had organized the Innocents for an appearance on Wink Martindale's pop music TV show.

In December 1960, two months after her 15th birthday, Kathy Young and the Innocents peaked at No. 6 on the R&B Singles chart, and at No. 3 on the Billboard Hot 100. Young's follow-up, "Happy Birthday Blues", peaked at No. 30 on the Hot 100 in 1961. Subsequent singles, such as "Magic Is the Night" and "The Great Pretender", failed to chart in the Top 40.

In July 1961 she appeared on DJ Alan Freed's highly publicized American road show.

In 1962, she followed Jim Lee to Monogram Records, recording solo and with Chicano rock singer Chris Montez. Still a teenager, she saw her promising career slowing to a standstill and, in 1964, traveled to London. There she married American singer-songwriter John Maus, aka John Walker, founder of the Walker Brothers. Her marriage to Maus lasted from 1965 to 1968.

Kathy returned to the US in 1969, remarrying two years later. Over the next 20 years, she raised children and helped manage the family citrus ranch in Central California. Following a move back to Los Angeles in 1994, she began working for a major international company while also returning to her original passion, music.

In the 2000s, she performed at numerous rock shows at venues such as the Greek Theatre in Los Angeles and New Jersey's Izod Center at the Meadowlands Sports Complex.

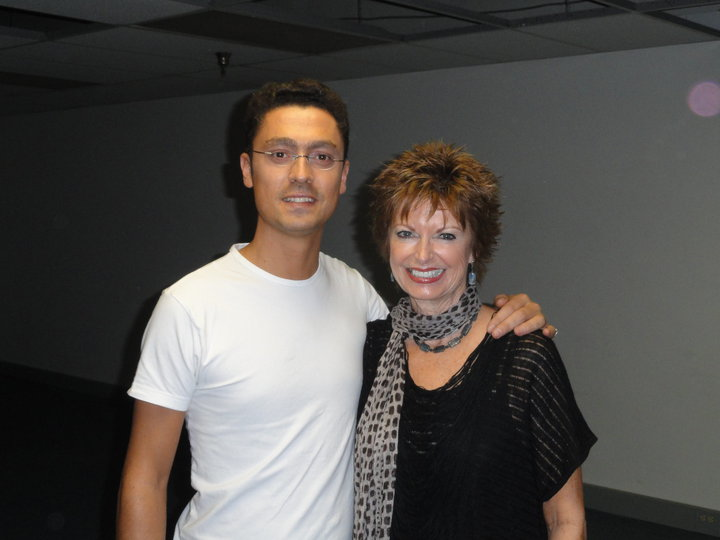
Kathy Young with Christian Carrasco, one of the members of the Spanish doo-wop band called the Earth Angels

Kathy Young was inducted into the Doo-Wop Hall of Fame, presided over by Harvey Robbins, on October 12, 2014, at the North Shore Music Theater in Beverly, Massachusetts.

== Discography ==
=== Albums ===
| Year | Album | Record label |
|---|---|---|
| 1961 | The Sound of Kathy Young (with The Innocents) | Indigo Records |
| 1981 | Our Best to You | Starfire Records |

=== Singles ===
| Year | Title | Peak chart positions | | Record Label | B-side | Album |
| Year | Title | US | R&B | Record Label | B-side | Album |
|---|---|---|---|---|---|---|
| 1960 | "A Thousand Stars" | 3 | 6 | Indigo Records | "Eddie My Darling" | The Sound of Kathy Young |
| 1961 | "Happy Birthday Blues" | 30 | – | Indigo Records | "Someone to Love" | The Sound of Kathy Young |
| 1961 | "Our Parents Talked It Over" | – | – | Indigo Records | "Just as Though You Were Here" | |
| 1961 | "Magic Is the Night" | 80 | – | Indigo Records | "Du Du'nt Du" | |
| 1961 | "Baby Oh Baby" | – | – | Indigo Records | "Great Pretender" | The Sound of Kathy Young |
| 1962 | "I'll Hang My Letters Out to Dry" | – | – | Indigo Records | "Lonely Blue Nights" | |
| 1962 | "Dream Awhile" | – | – | Indigo Records | "Send Her Away" | |
| 1962 | "(Hey There) Dream Boy" | – | – | Monogram Records | "I'll Love That Man" | |
| 1979 | "Sparkle and Shine" | – | – | Starfire Records | "Please Love Me Forever" | The Sound of Kathy Young |
