= Mercy, Mercy, Mercy =

1966 song by Joe Zawinul, Cannonball Adderley

Song by Cannonball Adderley

from the album Mercy, Mercy, Mercy! Live at "The Club"
- Released: December 1966
- Recorded: October 20, 1966
- Studio: Capitol Records (Los Angeles)
- Genre: Soul jazz
- Length: 5:10
- Label: EMI
- Songwriter: Joe Zawinul
- Producer: David Axelrod

Official audio
- "Mercy, Mercy, Mercy" on YouTube

"Mercy, Mercy, Mercy" is a jazz song written by Joe Zawinul in 1966 for Cannonball Adderley and which appears on Adderley's album Mercy, Mercy, Mercy! Live at "The Club". The song is the title track of the album and became a surprise hit in February 1967. "Mercy, Mercy, Mercy" went to no. 2 on the Soul chart and no. 11 on the Billboard Hot 100 chart.

== Original version ==
The original version was performed by: Cannonball Adderley (alto saxophone), Nat Adderley (cornet), Joe Zawinul (piano, electric piano), Victor Gaskin (bass) and Roy McCurdy (drums). The theme of the song is performed by Zawinul on a Wurlitzer electric piano previously used by Ray Charles.

== Musical analysis ==
The first part of the theme is played twice and is completely made of notes from the major pentatonic scale of the first degree.

The tune is in the key of B-flat major and has a 20-bar structure with four distinct sections. The chord progression is mainly made of dominant-seventh chords on the first, fourth and fifth degrees, giving the song a bluesy feeling although it does not follow a typical blues progression. The subdominant (IV) chord in the beginning section emphasizes this bluesy feeling. In the second section, the tonic chord alternates with a second-inversion subdominant chord, creating a parallel to the I-IV-V progression (in which the tonic moves to the subdominant).

== Marlena Shaw cover ==
Marlena Shaw recorded a version which peaked at no. 58 on the Billboard Hot 100 on the week of April 1, 1967. Shaw's version had lyrics by Gail Fisher and Vincent Levy, credited as "G. Levy" and "V. Levy." (Fisher's husband at the time was named John Levy.) It also peaked at no. 66 on the Cash Box Top 100 Singles chart on the week ending April 8.

== Buckinghams cover ==
"Mercy, Mercy, Mercy"

Single by The Buckinghams

from the album Time & Charges
- B-side: "You Are Gone"
- Released: June 1967
- Studio: Columbia Studios (New York City)
- Genre: Pop; soul
- Label: Columbia
- Songwriter: Joe Zawinul
- Producer: James William Guercio

The Buckinghams singles chronology
"Don't You Care" (1967)	"Mercy, Mercy, Mercy" (1967)	"Hey Baby (They're Playing Our Song)" (1967)

"Mercy, Mercy, Mercy" has been re-recorded numerous times, most notably by the Buckinghams, who reached no. 5 in August 1967, adding lyrics to the tune which were written by Johnny “Guitar” Watson & Larry Williams in Feb, 1967. Musicians on the Buckinghams' version included James Henderson, Lew McCreary and Richard Leith on trombone, Bill Peterson, Bud Childers on trumpet, John Johnson on sax, Lincoln Mayorga on Wurlitzer electric piano, Dennis Budimir on guitar, Carol Kaye on bass, and John Guerin on drums.

== Chart performance ==
=== Weekly charts ===
Chart (1967)	Peak position
Canada RPM Top Singles	4
U.S. Billboard Hot 100	5
U.S. Cash Box Top 100	5

=== Year-end charts ===
Chart (1967)	Rank
Canada	55
U.S. Billboard Hot 100	51
U.S. Cash Box	32

== Other notable versions ==
- Larry Williams & Johnny Watson, "Mercy, Mercy, Mercy" / "A Quitter Never Wins" (1967) – recorded the song as a duet in late 1966.
- Buddy Rich Big Band, Mercy, Mercy (1968) – live recorded.
