= The Mob (Chicago band) =

American rock and R&B band founded 1966

The MOB
- Origin: Chicago, Illinois, U.S.
- Genres: Rock, rhythm and blues
- Years active: 1966–1980, 2011–present
- Labels: Cameo-Parkway, Toddlin Town, Mercury, Daylight, Twinight, Colossus, MGM, Private Stock, Odyssey
- Members: Jim Holvay; Mike Sistak; Al Herrera; Artie Herrera; Jimmy Ford; Robert Ruffino; Gary Beisbier; Albert Maligmat
- Past members: Dave Heidelberg; Eric Collins; Tom Howard; Guy Shoeb; Larry Brubaker; Tony Nedza; Michael Cavanugh; Jim Ryan; Rob Swenson; Cordell Thompson; Dwight Kalb; Joe Farell; Eric Guthman
- Website: mikebaker45s.weebly.com

The MOB is an American rock and rhythm and blues show band from Chicago, Illinois. The band formed in January 1966 and earned headline status in every major showroom in Nevada and across the country including Canada, Puerto Rico and Hawaii. The MOB disbanded in 1980, and reunited in 2011 to perform together on stage as they were inducted into the South Dakota Rock And Roll Hall of Fame.

== History ==
Growing up around Chicago in a teen rock band with horns, Gary Beisbier and Jim Holvay continued their musical experience charting the instrumental "Beatle Time" on the WLS Silver Dollar Survey as The Livers. After the Caravan of Stars tours, The Chicagoans and The Executives, Holvay watched the 1951 movie "The Mob" and visioned a mob of musicians from a gangster town with pinstripe suits, black shirts, white ties and carnations. The MOB formed in 1966 with Mike Sistak, Gary Beisbier, Jim Holvay, Dave Heidelberg, Tony Nedza, James Franz and Dwight Kalb. By mid-1966, Big Al and Little Artie (from the group Kane And Able and Little Artie and The Pharaohs) along with Bobby Ruffino (from The Executives) joined The MOB.

Their original manager was Joe DeFrancisco. They were the first group from Chicago to include a full horn section (the Chicago horn rock sound).

=== Dick Clark's Young Worlds Fair ===
After the Dick Clark Caravan of Stars tours, members of The MOB were used to backing up other entertainers. Dick Clark's Young Worlds Fair was held at the International Amphitheater in the stock yards, Dick Clark was the master of ceremonies April 22 through May 1, 1966. The MOB played on the Dr. Pepper stage and backed-up artists like Freddie Cannon and others. Opening day featured Paul Revere And The Raiders, Gary Lewis & the Playboys, The Knickerbockers, Billy Joe Royal and Freddie Cannon. Appearing the following days were Lou Christie, The Mamas & the Papas, The Young Rascals, Sam the Sham and the Pharaohs, The Vogues, The Turtles and more.

=== Ravinia Festival Jazz-Folk Series Mod Night ===
Ravinia Festival ventured into a new event within its jazz-folk series titled Mod Night. "Mod" is a term used in the 60s and 70s for young people's subculture who liked British rock and American soul music. The first Mod Night was held on Wednesday, August 2, 1967 featuring The MOB the first hour followed by The Association the second hour. The Rolling Meadows series for teens "Happenings" bussed 43 senior high school students. The first Mod Night set an attendance record at Ravinia of 17,320 breaking the July 24, 1959 attendance record of 14,142 featuring the Kingston Trio and Gerry Mulligan.

=== The Inaugural Concerts 1973 ===
The second Inaugural of President Nixon and Vice President Spiro Agnew expanded the Inaugural Concert into three separate concerts: American Music Concert, The Inaugural Youth Concert and The Symphonic Concert. Held on Friday, January 19, 1973, it was the first to be held at the John F. Kennedy Center for the Performing Arts and the first to have multiple simultaneous concerts. The first Inaugural Youth Concert held at The Eisenhower Theatre of the John F. Kennedy Center for the Performing Arts featured pop, rock and soul groups including The MOB.

On Saturday, January 20, 1973, The Inaugural Youth Ball, also a first, was held the same time as the Inaugural Ball. Both The Inaugural Youth Concert and The Inaugural Youth Ball featured many MGM recording artists including The MOB.

=== South Dakota Rock and Roll Hall of Fame ===
In October 2010, Don Fritz, President of the South Dakota Rock And Roll Music Association announced that The MOB was selected under the category "bands". Inducted April 16, 2011 at the Ramkota Exhibit Hall in Sioux Falls, SD, more than 2,000 people in attendance saw and heard The MOB at their first reunion in 35 years.

== Discography ==
=== Albums ===
- The Mob (1970, Colossus)
- The Mob (1975, Private Stock) - ARG #66 (April 14, 1977)
- The Mob: The Heritage Sessions (1995 Compilation, Heritage Records)

=== Singles ===
- "Wait (Please Don't Walk Away)" b/w "Mystery Man" (1966, Cameo)
- "Disappear" b/w "I Wish You'd Leave Me Alone" (1968, Mercury)
- "Open The Door To Your Heart" b/w "I Wish You'd Leave me Alone" (1968, Daylight)
- "Unbelievable" b/w "Try A Little Tenderness" (1968, Twinight)
- "I Dig Everything About You" b/w "Love Has Got A Hold On Me" (1970, Colossus) #83 1-23-1971
- "Give It To Me" b/w "I'd Like To See More Of You" (1970, Colossus) #71 4-3-1971
- "Where You Lead" b/w "Lost" (1971, Colossus)
- "Money (That's All I Want)" b/w "Once A Man, Twice A Child" (1971, Colossus)
- "You Give Me The Strength (To Carry On)" b/w "Feel Like Dancin'" (1972, MGM)
- "One Way Ticket To Nowhere" b/w "Who's Shaking Your Jelly Roll" (1972, MGM)
- "Tear Down The House" b/w "Rockin' Revival" (1973, MGM)
- "Dynamite Lovin'" b/w "Fat Lucy" (1973, MGM)
- "Rock And Roller" b/w "Just One Good Woman" (1975, Private Stock)
- "Don't Let It Get You Down" b/w "Skysurf (Theme For The Hangliders)" (1976, Private Stock)
- "Love Connection" b/w "Gemini Lady" (1976, Private Stock)
- "I'll Always Love You" b/w "Savin' My Lovin' For You" (1980, Odyssey)
