= Jim Lounsbury =

American journalist

Jim Lounsbury (February 24, 1923, in Colo, Iowa – January 8, 2006, in Tucson, Arizona) was an early pioneer in rock and roll music and a radio news anchor.

Lounsbury hosted many of the first rock and roll radio programs (WIND and WJJD, Chicago; WOR, New York City) and later many rock and roll television shows, including Jim Lounsbury's Sock Hop, "Bandstand Matinee"', and The Record Hop (WGN-TV and WBKB, Chicago), as well as hosting many local record hops in the Chicago area in the 1950s and '60s, and occasionally guest-hosting for Dick Clark on American Bandstand. He also hosted one of the last shows with Buddy Holly, The Big Bopper, and Ritchie Valens, in Kenosha, Wisconsin on January 24, 1959 as part of the Winter Dance Party tour.

Later in his career, he became well known as a radio news journalist, ending his career as the national news anchor for UPI Radio News.

He lived in Skokie, IL in the early 60's, and had one daughter, Deborah, and one son, Steven. Lounsbury retired to Tucson, Arizona in the early 1980s. He and Helen Mason, whom he described as his "biggest fan", traveled around the Southwest in Jim's Cessna 182 airplane which he piloted. Jim occasionally wrote for Southwest Aviator magazine about his flying experiences. He also occasionally did voice-over work from his home. Jim died on January 8, 2006, in Tucson, Arizona.

== Book ==
Lounsbury was the author of a book about the beginning of rock 'n' roll: Hey, Look - I'm on TV.
