= Pitche Blende =

American garage/psychedelic rock band

Pitche Blende (band)
- Origin: Saginaw, Michigan, United States
- Genres: Garage rock; psychedelic rock; protopunk
- Years active: 1967-1970
- Past members: Laurie Seaman (Laurie Beebe Lewis); Jinny Seaman; Dennis Malenfant; Dan Quinnan; Mike Volker; Tom Morris

Pitche Blende was an American garage rock/psychedelic rock band formed in 1967, in Saginaw, Michigan. The group was composed of high school students, mostly from Arthur Hill High School, and became a regional success in the early Michigan Rock culture movement of the late 1960s and early 1970s. The band consisted of six members which included two sisters, vocalist Laurie Seaman (Laurie Beebe Lewis) and bassist Jinny Seaman, guitarist Dennis Malenfant, rhythm guitarist Dan Quinnan, drummer Mike Volker and singer Tom Morris. Clara Jeanne Seaman, mother of Laurie and Jinny, was the band's manager.

== History ==
The band was inspired by some of the heavier rock and psychedelic acts of the 1960s, but in spite of their young age, they played a major role in the burgeoning Michigan rock movement at the time. There was new territory for emerging female rock musicians during a time when women of America were redefining their roles within American society. The sisters of the group were influenced by other acts, such as their all-female Michigan peers, The Pleasure Seekers, whose membership consisted of Suzi Quatro and her sisters, as well as other strong female influences of that era such as Grace Slick and Janis Joplin.

Their approach evolved from the garage/psychedelic sound to more commercial rock as groups such as The Cherry Slush, who had already released two pop hit singles and were rising to the top on Billboard Magazine. Pitche Blende, however, remained experimental in nature. This was during a time when often concerts were three day-long music festival affairs, much like the Monterey Pop Festival of 1967 and Woodstock in 1969, when a numerous bands would perform. Meanwhile, in Michigan, there were other acts such as The MC5, Iggy Pop, Ted Nugent and The Amboy Dukes, Frijid Pink, Bob Seger, Mitch Ryder and the Detroit Wheels, Grand Funk Railroad, Question Mark & The Mysterians, Dick Wagner and The Frost, The SRC, Savoy Brown and The Pleaure Seekers (later Cradle), many of whom would attain national notoriety while routinely performing in clubs throughout the Mid-Michigan area. Dick Wagner supported many of the young musicians in Michigan and produced The Cherry Slush's first record. Pitche Blend frequently opened for Wagner, who became a mentor and family friend to the Seaman sisters, and continued to do work with them through the years.

Pitche Blende's popularity rapidly accelerated during this time, forsaking typical three-minute songs in favor of a new exploratory sound along the lines of more progressive bands such as Traffic, which they covered in their live shows. In 1969, they released their first and only vinyl recording, the single "My World Has Stopped" b/w "Stop", which received regional airplay and allowed them a preferred billing position among the more renowned groups of that time. The two songs were released on the Michigan Mixture Volume 1 LP (and later on the two-disc CD compilation) and are considered by garage rock and psychedelic collectors to be standout songs from the era. Pitche Blende disbanded in 1970, as tensions ensued with two of the members joining the Jesus movement, while the two sisters had broken up with the other two male band members.

== Discography ==
- 1968 - Pitche Blende - "My World has Stopped" b/w "Stop" (Valley 1102)
- 1990 - Michigan Mixture Volume 1 - (Clinging Hysteria CHR1) includes Pitche Blend "My World has Stopped"
- 2012 - Michigan Mixture Volume 1 (Spiral Groove – SGLP3010) Reissue. Includes Pitche Blend's "My World has Stopped" and "Stop"
