= Hey Baby (They're Playing Our Song) =

Single by The Buckinghams

from the album Portraits
- B-side: "And Our Love"
- Released: 1967
- Genre: Pop
- Length: 2:35
- Label: Columbia
- Songwriters: Gary Beisbier & Jim Holvay
- Producer: James William Guercio

The Buckinghams singles chronology
"Mercy, Mercy, Mercy" (1967)	"Hey Baby (They're Playing Our Song)" (1967)	"Susan" (1967)

"Hey Baby (They're Playing Our Song)" is a song by The Buckinghams, which they released as a single in 1967, and on their album Portraits in 1968.

== Chart performance ==
=== Weekly charts ===
It spent 10 weeks on the Billboard Hot 100 chart, peaking at No. 12, while reaching No. 2 on Canada's RPM 100, No. 5 in the Philippines, No. 7 in Malaysia, No. 5 on the Cash Box Top 100, and No. 9 on Record World's 100 Top Pops.

Chart (1967)	Peak position
Canada RPM 100	2
Malaysia (Radio Malaysia)	7
Philippines	5
US Billboard Hot 100	12
US Cash Box Top 100	5
US Record World 100 Top Pops	9

=== Year-end charts ===
Chart (1967)	Rank
U.S. (Joel Whitburn's Pop Annual)	121
