= Susan (song) =

Single by The Buckinghams

from the album Portraits
- B-side: "Foreign Policy"
- Released: 1967
- Genre: Sunshine pop; psychedelic pop
- Length: 2:48; 2:17 (radio edit)
- Label: Columbia Records
- Songwriters: Gary Beisbier; James William Guercio; Jim Holvay
- Producer: James William Guercio

The Buckinghams singles chronology
"Hey Baby (They're Playing Our Song)" (1967)	"Susan" (1967)	"Back in Love Again" (1968)

"Susan" is a song by The Buckinghams, released as a single in 1967, and on their album Portraits in 1968. It spent 12 weeks on the Billboard Hot 100 chart, peaking at No. 11, while reaching No. 7 on Canada's RPM 100, No. 2 on Canada's CHUM Hit Parade, No. 2 in the Philippines, and No. 18 on New Zealand's NZ Listener chart.

The song contains a short excerpt of Charles Ives' composition, Central Park in the Dark, which contrasts sharply with the sunshine pop flavor of the majority of the track. The section containing this excerpt was added by producer James William Guercio, and the group disliked it when they heard it. This section was edited out by many radio stations when they aired the song.

== Charts ==
=== Weekly charts ===
Chart (1967–68)	Peak position
Canada (RPM 100)	7
Canada (CHUM Hit Parade)	2
New Zealand (Listener)	18
Philippines	2
US Billboard Hot 100	11
US Cash Box Top 100	7
US Record World 100 Top Pops	6

=== Year-end charts ===
Chart (1968)	Rank
US Cash Box Top 100	55
US (Joel Whitburn's Pop Annual)	99
