= Don't You Care =

Single by The Buckinghams

Single by The Buckinghams

from the album Time & Charges
- B-side: "Why Don't You Love Me"
- Released: March 1967
- Recorded: 1967
- Studio: Columbia Studios, New York, NY
- Genre: Pop
- Length: 2:32
- Label: Columbia
- Songwriters: Gary Beisbier; Jim Holvay
- Producer: James William Guercio

The Buckinghams singles chronology
"Lawdy Miss Clawdy" (1967)	"Don't You Care" (1967)	"Mercy, Mercy, Mercy" (1967)

"Don't You Care" is a single by the Buckinghams from the album Time & Charges. The song spent 14 weeks on the Billboard Hot 100 in 1967, reaching number six, while reaching number one in the Philippines, and number four on Canada's RPM 100. It was recorded in Columbia's 16-track New York Studios.

== Chart performance ==
=== Weekly singles charts ===
Chart (1967)	Peak position
Canada - RPM 100	4
Philippines	1
US Billboard Hot 100	6
US Cash Box Top 100	6
US Record World 100 Top Pops	5

=== Year-end charts ===
Chart (1967)	Rank
Canada RPM 100	57
US Billboard Hot 100	39
US Cash Box Top 100	38
