= Odyssey Records =

- Parent company: Sony Music Entertainment (SME)
- Founded: 1966
- Founder: Columbia Masterworks Records
- Genre: Classical music

Odyssey Records is a budget classical music record label founded by Columbia Masterworks Records in 1966 as a reissue label. It is currently an imprint of Sony Masterworks.

In the 1970s, Odyssey became well known for issuing albums of avant-garde classical music, including electronic works. Works by Stockhausen, Boulez, Maxfield, Oliveros, Reich, Morton Feldman ("The Early Years"), and many other composers were made available through the label in that era.

In the early 2000s, Sony Classical repurposed the Odyssey imprint to showcase its growing roster of “crossover” artists, such as Canadian violinist Lara St. John, Greek tenor Mario Frangoulis, Brazilian singer and guitarist Rosa Passos, and American classical pianist Christopher O'Riley.
