= Raw 'n' Alive at the Cellar, Chicago 1966! =

Live album by The Shadows of Knight
- Released: 1992
- Recorded: December 1966
- Venue: The Cellar, Arlington Heights, Illinois
- Genre: Garage rock; blues rock; proto-punk
- Length: 42:37
- Label: Sundazed
- Producer: Jeff Jarma

The Shadows of Knight chronology
Shadows of Knight (1969)	Raw 'n' Alive at the Cellar, Chicago 1966! (1992)	A Knight to Remember (2007)

Raw 'n' Alive at the Cellar, Chicago 1966! is a live album by the American garage rock band the Shadows of Knight, and was released on Sundazed Music in 1992. The album consists of recordings from the band's appearance at the Cellar in Arlington Heights, Illinois in December 1966. Although the tapes were never anticipated to be released publicly, Raw 'n' Alive at the Cellar is commended for its good sound quality, and represents one of the better live concert recordings to emerge from the garage rock era.

== Background ==
The Shadows of Knight had initially come to national prominence in early-1966, when their less-risqué interpretation of Them's "Gloria" reached number 10 on the U.S. Billboard Hot 100 and number eight on Canada's RPM magazine charts. Further successes followed with the band releasing their debut album, Gloria, and reaching the Top 40 for the second time with a cover version of Bo Diddley's song "Oh Yeah". Throughout the first half of 1966, the band enjoyed tremendous popularity among teenage rock fans and their music received widespread airplay on Top 40 radio. In the latter half of 1966, the Shadow of Knight's second album, Back Door Men, was released, but was less commercially successful than the band's first LP. Combine with the rise of their rival act the Cryan' Shames, the group's popularity was on the decline nationally, though they still remained a top musical attraction in Chicago.

Recording at one of Chicago's more happening venues, the Cellar, the Shadows of Knight's setlist for the performance — speculated to have occurred in December 1966 — is composed mainly of blues covers taken from the band's first album. The songs "Tomorrow's Gonna Be Another Day", "Hey Joe", and "Gospel Zone" that represent some of the Back Door Men album, also figure into the Raw N' Alive set. The band noticeably emits a more angst-induced and punkish grit, channeling their own musical stance through the style of the Yardbirds and the Rolling Stones. Raw 'n' Alive also serves as a well-drawn document for the Shadow of Knight's progression as musical artists, with music historian Richie Unterberger pointing to "'It Takes a Long Time Comin', an original that never made it to the studio, makes extensive elastic allusions to the Beatles' 'Taxman', Frank Zappa is quoted elsewhere and, most impressively, the group pushes 'Hey Joe' toward the stratosphere, finding a comfortable intersection between a Yardbirds rave-up and proto-psychedelic drone".

Upon release, Raw 'n' Alive was commended for its good sound quality, even though the tapes were not intended to be a proper release: they are actually tapes Paul Sampson, the owner of the Cellar, happened to make while the Shadows of Knight headlined at the club. On January 27, 2015, Sundazed Music reissued an expanded-version of the recordings, retitled simply as Live 1966. The re-released album features three bonus tracks from the concert, including a rendition of "Peepin' and Hidin'" sung by lead guitarist Joe Kelley, "Willie Jean" and "Any Way That You Want Me", all compiled in a new artwork and a higher-fidelity. In addition, the album also has a rearranged track listing to better approximate the actual order of the Shadow of Knight's performance.

== Track listing ==
1. "I Got My Mojo Working" (McKinley Morganfield) – 4:07
2. "Oh Yeah" (Ellas McDaniel) – 3:45
3. "Tomorrow's Going to Be Another Day" (Tommy Boyce) – 2:24
4. "It Takes a Long Time Comin'" (Harry Pye) – 2:44
5. "Let It Rock" (Chuck Berry) – 2:06
6. "Hey Joe" (Billy Roberts) – 4:23
7. "Gospel Zone" (Tom Schiffour) – 1:56
8. "Got to Get You Off My Mind" (Delores Burke, Josephine Burke Moore, Solomon Burke) – 1:47
9. "Everybody Needs Somebody to Love" (Bert Berns, Jerry Wexler, S. Burke) – 3:29
10. "Don't Fight It" (Steve Cropper, Wilson Pickett) – 4:02
11. "Spoonful" (Willie Dixon) – 3:43
12. "Darkside" (Warren Rogers, James Alan Sohns) – 1:59
13. "Gloria" (Van Morrison) – 6:12

== Personnel ==
=== Musicians ===
- David "Hawk" Wolinski – bass guitar, electric piano (track 9)
- Joe Kelly – lead guitar, blues harp (track 3)
- Jerry McGeorge – guitar, bass guitar (track 9)
- Tom Schiffour – drums
- Jim Sohns – vocals

=== Technical ===
- Bob Irwin – producer
- Jeff Jarema – producer
