= USA Records =

American independent record label

USA Records was an American, Chicago based independent record label.

== Background ==
Jim Golden started the USA label as part of Chicago's Allstate Distributors in 1960, which was owned by Paul Glass. USA Record Co., Inc. had its office at 1448 South Michigan Avenue, Chicago, Illinois 60605, which was across the street from Chess Records and Glass's Allstate Distributors, Chess' regional distributor. While USA had a few regional hits, their biggest hit came in 1967 with the chart-topping "Kind of a Drag" by The Buckinghams. The label lasted until 1969.

== History (USA) ==
Ricky Allen recorded "I Ain't Never" bw "Hurt Look on My Face", which was released on USA 858 in 1966. It was a Billboard R&B Spotlight Chart record for the week of 17 December.

The Buckinghams recorded the single, "Kind of a Drag" which was backed with "You Make Me Feel So Good" and released on USA 860. It was reported by Kal Rudman's Money Music in the 24 December 1966 issue of Record World that "Kind of a Drag" was a monstor in Chicago and spreading fast.

A group called The Skunks recorded the song "Elvira". Backed with "The Journey", it was released on USA 865 in 1967. It was reviewed in the 11 March issue of Cash Box, along with another version by Baby Ray. The appeal of both songs was noted. The single was a Billboard Spotlight Single, Hot 100 prediction for the week of 25 February.

== History (Jim Golden) ==
Jim Golden produced the single "Heart Teaser Crowd Pleaser" bw "New Day's Sunshine" for Big Sir. Written by English, O'Brien and St. Clair, "Heart Teaser Crowd Pleaser" was a cover of the song that was breakout hit for Flavor. The Big Sir record was a Cash Box Newcomer Pick for the week of 2 July 1969. The reviewer said that the record belts into a sensational rock side and had teen appeal and would find immediate acceptance. It was also a Record World Four Star Pick for the week of 19 July. The reviewer said that there was a lot of crowd pleasing in the grooves and it was a gritty teen rocker with lots of go.

== Later years ==
USA Records worldwide rights were acquired by 43 North Broadway, LLC in 2015.

Founder Jim Golden died on 30 June 2014.
