= Jim Golden (music producer) =

- Born: 23 April 1938
- Died: 30 June 2014 (aged 76)
- Occupations: Record producer, music industry executive
- Organization(s): USA Records, Wooden Nickel Records, C.O.R.D., Homewood House Music, General Talent Agency

Jim Golden aka James Lee Golden was a music executive and record producer and occasional composer. He was active mainly during the 1960s and 1970s. He produced recordings for The American Breed, The Cryan' Shames, The Flock, The Hardy Boys, Mason Proffit, The Trolls and others.

== Background ==
Jim Golden was the founder of the Chicago-based USA Records, which had chart success with the Buckinghams, the Flock and the Rivieras. After the label's closure, he joined Dunwich Productions which was headed by Bill Traut.

Golden was a partner in Wooden Nickel Records, a company that was an RCA customlabel. In the early 1970s, the ownership was divided equally between Jim Golden, Jerry Weintraub and Bill Traut. Golden had Los Angeles, Weintraub had New York and Traut had Chicago. Some of the artists on the Wooden Nickel roster were, Styx, Exile and Ted Neeley.

Between 1966 and late 1968, Golden, Bill Traut and Bob Monaco were responsible for fifty-seven records hitting the charts. At the time, they had the careers of artists such as the American Breed, the Cryan' Shames, the Will-o-Bees, the Castaways, Ginny Tiu & the Few, Eddie Higgins, the Byzantine Empire and Chad Mitchell under their direction.

Golden also formed the publishing co., Homewood House Music with partners Peter Burke and Susan Pomerantz. One of the songs they published was the Johnny Mathis and Deniece Williams hit "Too Much, Too Little, Too Late".

== Career ==
=== 1960s ===
Jim Golden was the national director or (CORD) Co-Operative Organization of Record Dealers, a Chicago-based record-buying cooperative that was founded in early 1966. According to Golden, one of the benefits of the co-op was with the low-cost purchase of records, they could then enable the profits to be distributed with 40 per cent to management, 40 per cent to suppliers and 20 per cent to purchasers.

The group New Colony Six had their single released on the Centaur label. Golden was the contact for the interested parties.

Golden produced the single, "It Could Be We're in Love" for the Cryan Shames which was released on the Columbia label. It entered the Cash Box Top 100 chart for the week of 29 March 1967. It made it to no. 85 on the Billboard chart.

Golden produced "Up on the Roof" for the Cryan' Shames which was released in 1968. It was a chart hit and got to no. 85 on the Billboard chart.

In October 1968, Golden and Bob Monaco merged their MG Productions company, and Destination Music and Go-Mo Music (publishing companies) into Bill Traut's Dunwhich Productions along with publishers, Yuggoth Music and Dunwich Music. This created the expanded Dunwich Music Ltd., which as of December 1968 was the most influential music complex in the Midwest.

Golden produced the Big Sir single, "Heart Teaser Crowd Pleaser" bw "New Day's Sunshine". It was written by English, O'Brien and St. Clair, "Heart Teaser Crowd Pleaser" was previously a cover of the song that was breakout hit for Flavor. The Big Sir record was a Cash Box Newcomer Pick for the week of 2 July 1969. The reviewer said that the record belts into a sensational rock side and had teen appeal and would find immediate acceptance. It was also a Record World Four Star Pick for the week of 19 July, with the reviewer saying that there was a lot of crowd pleasing in the grooves and it was a gritty teen rocker with lots of go.

Golden and Bill Traut produced the Hardy Boys "Love and Let Love" single. Backed with "Sing or Swim", it was released on the RCA label. The reviewer noted that the Group was making their TV debut in a new fall cartoon series, and they should be as important as The Archies. The record was referred to as "a solid, bubble gum winner".

=== 1970s ===
It was on Golden's Destination label that the group Jamestown Massacre released their first professional single, "Comin Home to You" bw "The Next Round".

Working with Bob Monaco, Golden co-produced the single, "Evel Knievel" by Rawhide. The single was one of the Billboard Special Merit Spotlight singles for the week of 31 July 1971 with the reviewer saying that the story about the daredevil cyclist could be a hit on the Hot 100 for the new group.

Working with producers, Bob Monaco and Barry Fasman, Golden produced the single, "Guitar Picker" for Megan McDonough. It was released on the Wooden Nickel label. It was one of the Billboard Radio Action Picks for the week of 15 April 1972. It was already seeing action on KEYN in Wichita.

Working with producer Barry Fasman, Golden (credited as James Lee Golden) produced the single, "You Are Gone" for folk-country singer James Patton. A Special Merit Spotlight single for the week of 6 November 1971, the reviewer wrote that the tear-jerker could make a dent in the Top 40 playlists.

Working again with producer Barry Fasman, Golden produced the single, "People in Dallas Got Hair" for David Patton. Released on the Wooden Nickel label, it was a Billboard recommended single for the week of 29 September 1972.

=== 1980s ===
It was reported in the 22 August 1981 issue of Cash Box that Jim Golden had been appointed to the position of vice president of Management III's management division. Prior to that he was president of General Talent Agency with partner and vice president Bill Traut. Some of the acts the agency handled were, The Ohio Players, Michael Johnson and Y&T (aka Yesterday & Tomorrow).

During the 1980s, Golden was managing Ziggy Marley and the Melody Makers.

== Death ==
Jim Golden died at home at age 76 on 30 June 2014. He was survived by his daughter Ashley, 2 grandchildren, his partner Brenda, his sister and extended family.
