= This Love's for You =

Song by Rena Scott

from the album Love Zone
- A-side: 7" single: "This Love's for You" (7" Radio Edit) 12" single: "This Love's for You" (7" Radio Edit), "This Love's for You" (Instrumental Edit)
- B-side: 7" single: "This Love's for You" (LP Version) 12" single: "This Love's for You" (Extended), "This Love's for You" (LP Version)
- Released: 1989
- Label: 7" single: Sedona Recording Company SDS-7512 12" single: Sedona Recording Company SDO-7512
- Composer: G. St. Clair
- Producer: Tim O'Brien

Rena Scott singles chronology
"(No Parking in My) Love Zone" (1988)	"This Love's for You" (1989)	"I Could Use a Kiss" (1989)

"This Love's for You" was a 1989 single for Rena Scott. It became a hit for her that year on the Billboard Hot Black Singles chart.

== Background ==
The single was taken from Scott's Love Zone album. It was composed by Gary St. Clair and produced by Tim O'Brien. The single was released on the Sedona Recording Company label.

== Reception ==
For the period of 17-30 July 1989 as shown in The R&B Report, WXYV in Baltimore had "This Love's for You" as a Hit Pick.

== Airplay ==
It was noted by Radio & Records in the publication's 23 June 1989 issue that "This Love's for You" was seeing significant national action at urban radio stations. It was added to ten playlists which included, WBLZ, WPAL, WJTT, WALT, WIKS, WEAS, WTMP, KBUZ, KPRW, and WVOI. The following week, it was added to seven playlists, which were, WNHC, WFXE, WQFX, KIIZ, U102, KMJJ, and WGPR.

As shown in the 17–30 July 1989 issue of The R&B Report, the single was added to the playlists of KVVTD in Lonoke and KDKO in Englewood.

For the week of 22 July, as shown on the Billboard Power Playlists chart, "This Love's for You" was at no. 45 on radio V-103.

It was recorded in the 28 July issue of The Gavin Report that Rena Scott's single was added to the playlists of urban contemporary stations; WWKX in the Northeast, WMGL in Boston and KFXZ in Maurice / Lafayette, Louisiana.

For the 31 July to 13 August period, as shown in The R&B Report, Scott's single was added to the playlist of WWKX in Woonsotket.

For the week of 19 August, the single was added to the playlist of fifty-three radio stations from WXYV to KDIA.

== Charts ==
For the week of 5 August 1989, "This Love's for You" debuted at no. 88 on the Billboard Hot Black Singles chart. Having been in the chart for two weeks, it peaked at no. 80 for the week of 12 August. It was still in the chart for the week of 26 August.
