= Do That to Me One More Time =

1979 single by Captain & Tennille

Single by Captain & Tennille

from the album Make Your Move
- B-side: "Deep in the Dark"
- Released: October 1979 (US); January 1980 (UK)
- Genre: Soft rock; easy listening; middle-of-the-road
- Length: 3:45 (single version); 4:17 (album version)
- Label: Casablanca
- Songwriter: Toni Tennille
- Producer: Daryl Dragon

Captain & Tennille singles chronology
"You Need a Woman Tonight" (1978)	"Do That to Me One More Time" (1979)	"Love on a Shoestring" (1980)

"Do That to Me One More Time" is a song performed by the American pop duo Captain & Tennille. It was their 13th charting hit in the United States, and their second number-one hit on the Billboard Hot 100 chart. The song was included on the duo's 1979 studio album, Make Your Move, and was written by Toni Tennille. It features a Lyricon solo by saxophonist Tom Scott.

The duo also recorded a version of the song in Spanish, translated as Ámame una vez más.

== History ==
After a decline in popularity from the height of their success in the mid-1970s, the Captain and Tennille signed with Casablanca Records under the guidance of Neil Bogart. "Do That to Me One More Time" was a comeback for the duo, but they failed to achieve further success on Casablanca and their contract was not renewed. Vocalist and songwriter Toni Tennille played the song for Bogart at her house with husband Daryl Dragon in Pacific Palisades, California on an electric piano. Bogart reacted enthusiastically, saying: "That's a smash! There's no doubt in my mind that's going to be your first single." According to Billboard, the song is about sex, specifically "male virility." According to Toni Tennille, she wrote the song about how she felt for Daryl Dragon; however as she put it, "the funny thing was, later on he told me that he never paid any attention to the lyrics... so he didn't know what I was saying".

== Composition ==
The song is performed in the key of C major. The key changes to D major for the final chorus and ending. It moves at a tempo of 90 beats per minute in common time. The vocals span from E_{4} to B_{5}.

== Release and reception ==
"Do That to Me One More Time" became Captain & Tennille's second and final number-one hit (also their final Top 40 song in the U.S.) when it reached the pinnacle of the Billboard Hot 100 chart the week ending February 16, 1980. The song had logged four consecutive weeks in the runner-up position on this chart behind Michael Jackson's hit "Rock with You" before ascending to the top of the chart. The song spent a single week in the pole position before being succeeded on February 23 by Queen's "Crazy Little Thing Called Love". Overall, "Do That to Me One More Time" spent 27 weeks on the Hot 100.

The song also achieved some crossover success on the Billboard adult contemporary and R&B charts. It was their highest-charting hit on the UK Singles Chart, where it reached number seven in March 1980. It also peaked at number three in Australia and was number one in the Netherlands.

Record World called "Do That to Me One More Time" a "warm & tender pop-a/c gem." Writing for Stereogum, Tom Breihan criticized the song due to perceiving the lyrics about married sex to be too sleazy and described the production as "ugly and antiseptic late-'70s easy-listening nothingness", scoring the song 2/10.

== Charts and certifications ==
=== Weekly charts ===
Chart (1980)	Peak position
Argentina	6
Australia (Kent Music Report)	3
Belgium (Ultratop 50 Flanders)	1
Canada Top Singles (RPM)	4
Canada Adult Contemporary (RPM)	1
Dutch Top 40	2
Germany	33
Ireland (Irish Singles Chart)	5
Netherlands (Single Top 100)	1
New Zealand Singles Chart	5
South Africa (Springbok)	1
Spain (AFYVE)	7
UK Singles Chart	7
US Billboard Hot 100	1
US Billboard Adult Contemporary	4
US Billboard Hot Soul Singles	58

=== Year-end charts ===
Chart (1980)	Rank
Australia (Kent Music Report)	26
Canada	25
South Africa	14
US Top Pop Singles (Billboard)	5

=== All-time charts ===
Chart (1958-2018)	Position
US Billboard Hot 100	119

=== Certifications ===
Region	Certification	Certified units/sales
Canada (Music Canada)	Gold	75,000^{^}
United States (RIAA)	Gold	1,000,000^{^}
^{^} Shipments figures based on certification alone.

== Personnel ==
Credits sourced from the original album liner notes.

Captain & Tennille

- Toni Tennille - lead vocals, Fender Rhodes electric piano
- Daryl Dragon - Oberheim Four Voice synthesizer

Additional musicians

- Lee Ritenour - acoustic guitars
- Scott Edwards - bass guitar
- Ralph Humphrey - drums
- Ken Watson - percussion
- Tom Scott - Lyricon

== Rena Scott version ==
"Do That to Me One More Time"

Song by Rena Scott

from the album Love Zone
- A-side: "Do That to Me One More Time"
- B-side: "Can't Wait till Tomorrow"
- Released: 1987
- Length: 4:50
- Label: Sedona Recording Company SDS-7503
- Composer: Toni Tennille
- Producer: Tim O'Brien

USA chronology
"Hold Up" (1986)	"Do That to Me One More Time" (1987)	"(No Parking in My) Love Zone" (1988)

Rena Scott recorded the song which was a hit on the Billboard Hot Black Singles and Cash Box Top Black Contemporary Singles charts in 1988.

=== Background ===
Rena Scott's version of the song was released on Sedona 70530. It was taken from her Love Zone album which was produced by Tim O'Brien.

=== Reception ===
The record was reviewed in the 19 February 1988 issue of Black Radio Exclusive by Duff Marlowe. Marlowe called the song an exciting version and was getting hot action all across black radio. There were rave reviews by program directors across the US.

According to Deborah Sims, the program director for WBLK in Buffalo, New York, Rena Scott's "Do That to Me One More Time" was the perfect adult record.

=== Airplay ===
==== 1987 ====
As per the 11 December 1987 issue of Black Radio Exclusive, Scott's single was added to the playlist of WIKS in New Bern, NC, WPAL in Charleston, SC, WGOK in Mobile, AL, WZAZ in Jacksonville, FL, and WKXI in Jackson MS. It was reported by Billboard in the magazine's 12 December issue, Hot Black Singles Action, Radio Most Added section, that "Do That to Me One More Time" by Rena Scott had a total of fourteen add-ons.

==== 1988 ====
As per the January 18 - 31, 1988 issue of The R&B Report, Rena Scott's single had been added to the playlists of R&B stations, WDAS in Philadelphia, WLUM in Elm Grove, WGPR in Detroit, and WEDR in Miami. The song's radio action was recorded in the 2 February issue of Radio & Records in the Urban Contemporary New & Active section. The song was having one heavy rotation, eighteen medium rotations and seventeen light rotations. It was also no. 2 on the New Artists chart with 36/3 in Reports/Adds.

=== Charts ===
==== Billboard ====
For the week of 16 January 1988, the single debuted at no. 84 on the Billboard Hot Black Singles chart. At week five, on 13 February, it reached its peak position of no. 55. It was still in the chart for the week of 12 March.

==== Cash Box ====
It debuted at no. 81 in the Cash Box Top Black Contemporary Singles chart for the week of 30 January 1988. At week four, it peaked at no. 59 and held that position for another week during its seven-week chart run.

== See also ==
- List of Billboard Hot 100 number-one singles of 1980
