= Love Zone (Rena Scott album) =

Studio album by Rena Scott
- Released: 1988
- Studio: Castle Oaks Recording, Brookhill and Valley Center Studios
- Label: Sedona Recording Company SDI 7511
- Producer: Tim O'Brien

Rena Scott chronology
Come on Inside (1979)	Love Zone (1988)	Let Me Love You (2004)

Love Zone is a 1988 album for soul/dance singer Rena Scott. It made the Billboard Top Black Albums chart. It also contained three hit singles.

== Background ==
The album was produced by Tim O'Brien. It was released on Sedona Recording Company SDI 7511 in 1989. The album appears to have had an early release in 1988. It was also released on cassette SDT 7511.

Four singles were released from the album: "Do That to Me One More Time", "(No Parking in My) Love Zone", "This Love's for You", and "I Could Use a Kiss". The first was written by Toni Tennille and the second and third ones were written by Gary St. Clair. The fourth single, "I Could Use a Kiss", written by Felton Pilate and Garey Senguinetti received airplay in some markets.

== Reception ==
The album had a brief review in the Artists Breaking Through-Fall '88, New Music Programming Guide by Radio & Records. The reviewer said that Rena Scott brings it all together on the album. The reviewer also said that it had strong rhythmic tracks, sensitive melodies and seductive vocals.

According to Ron Wynn of AllMusic, Rena Scott had a strong, and sometimes sensual voice. The album wasn't as well-produced as her Buddha / Arista debut. He said that the title song was mildly interesting, but the rest of the album was routine urban contemporary and dance-pop filler.

Barry Towler of Soul Express was reviewing Scott's 2004 album, Let Me Love You and wrote how he fell in Love with Scott's 1978 album. He also wrote that he fell in further with her superb 1989 Love Zone album, which featured the superb "Night Dancing", a song that was one was one of his hot summer favorites.

== Charts ==
The album debuted at no. 90 on the Billboard Top Black Albums chart for the week of 12 August 1989. For the week of 9 September and at week five in the chart, it reached its peak position of no. 70. It held the position for another week.

== Track listing ==
Side A

1. "(No Parking in My) Love Zone" - 5:28
2. "Choose You" - 4:46
3. "This Love's for You" - 5:19
4. "Kingsize" - 4:47
5. "Ought To Be a Love" - 5:08

Side B

1. "Do That to Me One More Time" - 4:53
2. "I Could Use a Kiss" - 6:22
3. "Night Dancing" - 6:19
4. "Don't Know What You Got" - 5:21
5. "Everytime I Fall in Love" - 4:13
