= Demetri Callas =

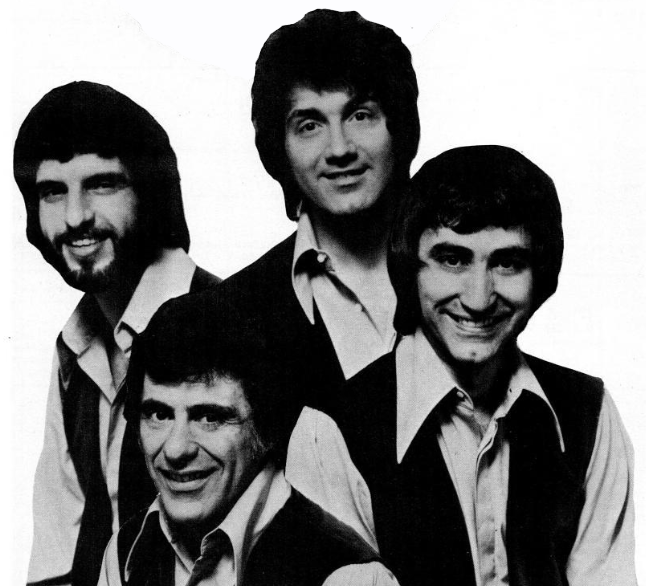
- Callas (at top right) with The Four Seasons in 1973.

Background information
- Born: Pantelis John Callas; 7 June 1942; United States
- Died: 13 January 2020 (aged 77)
- Occupation: Musician
- Instruments: Guitar, vocals
- Years active: 1960s - 2010s
- Formerly of: The Playboys, Bill Black's Combo, Demetri & the Bad Boys, Billy Joe and his Confidentials, The Bad Boys, Flavor, The Four Seasons

Pantelis John Callas (June 7, 1942—January 13, 2020), professionally known as Demetri Callas and Penny Callas, was an American guitarist and composer who had a career that began in the early 1960s and lasted for more than fifty years. He was a member of various bands from the 1960s to 1970s and played his Telecaster on the hit songs "Black Olives", "Sally Had a Party", "The Night" and "My Eyes Adored You".

== Background ==
Callas was born on 7 June 1942 to parents John Pantelis Callas and Anastasia Chantiles Callas. His father was a Greek Immigrant, and his mother was a daughter of Greek immigrants. His father was the owner and manager of the Bluebird Restaurant in downtown Frederick.

Demetri's introduction to music was with an accordion at age seven, and he took lessons. It was around the time when he was fourteen, he started playing guitar. He bought a guitar from a pawn shop, and it was on New Years Eve 1958 that he formed his own band. The band was called The Playboys which was made up of Callas, Pete Storm and their friend Hank Kline, who used a trash can for a drum.

The original Four Seasons were, Franki Valli, Nick Massi, Bob Gaudio and Tommy DeVito. Demetri Callas was one of the additional members that came and went through the Four Seasons career.

== Career ==
=== 1960s ===
During the 1960s, Callas played guitar for Ronnie Dove. Later, he went on the road with the Bill Black Combo for a year. He returned to Washington in 1964, where he formed his own ensemble, Demetri & the Bad Boys, which included himself on guitar, Al Ruzicka on keyboards, Eddie Rosetti on drums and Larry Mann on saxophone. They were a regular act at the Starlight on Irving Street NW until September that year.

Callas would end up performing with an artist called Billy Joe Ash. One night Callas and Ash saw Gary St. Clair and Danny Conway performing in a band known as Duke and the Glisandos, which was the house band at Diamond Jim's nightclub. They asked St. Clair and Conway to join their new group. The group was called Billy Joe and the Confidentials (aka Billy Joe and his Confidentials). The three of them backed Ash who was playing saxophone as well as singing. Their main place they played at was Benny's Rebel Room on 14th Street NW. In spring that year they accepted a work offer from the manager of the LaFlame club in Orlando, Florida. In June 1965, Callas, St. Clair and Conway split from Billy Joe Ash and started going under the name of the Bad Boys.

It has been speculated that Billy Joe Ash is the same singer as Billy Joe Young who recorded for the Paula and Jewel record labels. A single by Billy Joe and His Confidentials, "Got You on My Mind" bw "Feeling Blue" was released on B-J 45-64 at some stage in 1965.

==== The Bad Boys ====
With St. Clair and Conway, Callas composed the song "Black Olives". The song was registered in 1966. "Black Olives" was the B side of "Love" which was released on Paula 254 in 1966. The song was a hit, peaking at no 35. in the Top 50 In R&B Locations chart for the week of 24 December 1966, and peaking again at no. 35 for the week of 7 January. It also peaked at no. 11 on the Cash Box Looking Ahead chart for the week of 25 February. It got to no. 32 on the Record World Top 50 R&B chart for the week of 21 January.

==== Flavor ====
Flavor was a group that was made up of Callas on guitar, Gary St. Clair on vocals and bass, and Danny Conway on drums. They recorded "Sally Had a Party". It was a hit for the group, peaking at no. 66 on the Cash Box Top 100 for the week of 24 August. It was still in the chart for the week of 7 September. It also peaked at no. 81 on the Record World 100 Top Pops chart for the week of 31 August. It made the Billboard charts, and spent a total of five weeks in the chart, peaking at no. 95 on 3 August 1968.

The group also recorded single, "Heart-Teaser" bw "Yea I'm Hip" which was released on Columbia 4-44673 in 1968. It was a breakout hit for the group, and charted, making its debut at no. 31 in the Cash Box Looking Ahead chart for the week of 21 December. It peaked at no. 23 the following week.

They released another single, "Coming on Home" bw "Dancing in the Street" on Columbia 4-44881 in 1969.

They played a series of concerts in 1969. Their producer Tim O'Brien left Columbia Records for a job as A&R head at Paramount. He worked a deal to bring Flavor to the Paramount label. They followed him to California and were finding it hard until they got a job at the Flamingo. However, they were still under contract to Columbia and were sent by their label to Las Vegas. While there, they were waiting to be released from Columbia.

=== 1970s - 1990s ===
Sometime in 1970, due to losing direction, Flavor broke up. Callas played guitar on the Silent Song Through the Land album by Ron Davies which was released that year.

==== The Four Seasons ====
It was in late 1970 that Callas was recruited into The Four Seasons. He took the place of founding member and lead guitarist Tommy DeVito. Callas persuaded Frankie Valli to take on board musicians, keyboardist Al Ruzicka, tenor vocalist Bill DeLoach and drummer Paul Wilson; Ruzicka and Bob Gaudio would serve as the primary songwriters on Chameleon, the only Four Seasons album to feature Callas.

During his time with The Four Seasons, he toured throughout the U.S. and internationally. Because of the debts DeVito had incurred, Callas's tenure with the band was marked by a grueling touring schedule of up to 300 concerts per year (some of which featured Bob Grimm in Callas's stead) until the debts were paid off in 1973. Callas—after briefly being fired along with much of the rest of the band in 1973 but then rehired shortly thereafter— resigned in 1974, acknowledging afterward that his wild behavior had put him at risk of being fired and that, rather than wait for Valli and Gaudio to fire him, resigned voluntarily. Callas had joined the band during a low point in its career, and only after his departure did his material become hits, including "My Eyes Adored You" (Callas's favorite work with the Four Seasons) and the British Northern soul hit "The Night." By the time "My Eyes Adored You" was publicly debuted in September 1974, former The Happenings guitarist John Paiva had replaced Callas. The members Callas had brought on had likewise been replaced by Lee Shapiro and Gerry Polci respectively, who would serve as the core for the band during its mid-1970s renaissance.

=== 2000s - 2020 ===
It was reported in the 28 June 2012 issue of The Frederick News-Post that Callas was returning to Frederick the following week, where he would be guesting with Frederick band, The Shades and would be performing at the Frederick Elks Lodge. The following night he was booked to appear at Hagerstown with a group called The Teddy Boys, as part of the city's Fourth of July celebration.

== Death ==
Demetri Callas died on 13 January 2020 due to heart failure, complicated by Parkinson's disease.
