= Flavor (band) =

1960s rock group

- Origin: Frederick, Maryland
- Genres: Rock, R&B
- Years active: c 1967 - 1970
- Label: Columbia
- Spinoff of: The Bad Boys
- Past members: Gary St. Clair; Demetri Callas; Danny Conway

Flavor was a 1960s rock group that was led by Gary St. Clair. They are remembered for their national hit "Sally Had a Party" and the breakout hit "Heart-Teaser".

== Background ==
Flavor was a group from Frederick, Maryland. It was made up of guitarist, Demetri Callas (born 7 June 1942), vocalist, keyboardist, bassist, guitarist Gary St. Clair (born 10 August 1946) and drummer, Danny Conway (born 9 May 1948). According to a 1968 article by the Greenville Delta Democrat Times, all of the members grew up listening to the soul, rock sound. Organist St. Clair was the leader. Callas had started on guitar around the age of fourteen. Danny Conway the drummer was said to be the quiet member.

Things started happening with Demetri Callas who played guitar for Ronnie Dove, and then later went on the road with the Bill Black Combo. When he returned to Washington in 1964, he formed his own ensemble, Demetri & the Bad Boys, which included himself on guitar, Al Ruzicka on keyboards, Eddie Rosetti on drums and Larry Mann on saxophone. They played regularly at the Starlight on Irving Street NW until September that year.

=== Billy Joe and his Confidentials ===
At some stage, Callas was performing with Billy Joe Ash.

One night Gary St. Clair and Danny Conway were performing in a band known as Duke and the Glisandos, the house band at Diamond Jim's nightclub. They were spotted there by Callas and Ash who then asked them to come on board with them in their new group. This would be the first time that the three future Flavor members played together. The group was called Billy Joe and the Confidentials (aka Billy Joe and his Confidentials). The three of them backed Ash who was on vocals and saxophone. It was at Benny's Rebel Room on 14th Street NW where the group played mostly. In spring that year they had a work offer from the manager of the LaFlame club in Orlando, Florida which they accepted.

In June 1965, the three of them split from Billy Joe Ash and started going under the name of the Bad Boys.

At some stage during that year, a single credited the group, "Feeling Blue bw "Got You on My Mind" was released on B-J Records 45–64.

== The Bad Boys ==
Having left Billy Joe Ash in Orlando, the Bad Boys returned to Maryland. During the 1965 to 1967 period, they played at venues around the Frederick, Maryland area. On occasion they would play away from their area in Charles Town, West Virginia and Washington DC.

=== "Black Olives" ===
A distant booking in Cincinnati, Ohio turned into a trip where their agent sent them on to Louisville, Kentucky for recording session. The session took place in Sambo Studio, where they cut their single, "Love" bw "Black Olives" with producers Charlie Daniels and Ray Allen. Daniels was also the arranger for both songs. The musicians who played on the recording sessions were, Gary St. Clair on organ, Charlie Daniels on bass, Danny Conway on drums, and Demetri Callas on guitar. The songs were released on Paula 254 in 1966. It was "Black Olives" that would get the attention, and it had good reviews in Record World and Cash Box. The record was a hit in various charts from 17 December 1966, to 18 March 1967. It peaked at no. 35 twice on the Cash Box 50 In R&B Locations chart in 1966, and 1967. It peaked at no. 11 in the Cash Box Looking Ahead chart, and at no. 32 in the Record World Top 50 R&B chart.

==== Further activities ====
The group appeared regularly at the Rabbit's Foot. The group were eventually spotted by Columbia Records and eventually, they changed their name to Flavor.

== Flavor ==
Flavor, which had been described as a rock trio from Frederick, Maryland, was made up of Gary St. Clair on vocals and bass, Demetri Callas on guitar and Danny Conway on drums. Their production work was handled by Tim O'Brien.

=== "Sally Had a Party" ===
The group recorded the single, "Sally Had a Party" bw "Shop Around", which was released on Columbia 4–44521 in 1968. It ended up being a hit, peaking at no. 66 on the Cash Box Top 100 for the week of 24 August. It was still charting for the week of 7 September. It also got to no. 81 on the Record World 100 Top Pops chart for the week of 31 August. It also had a five-week run on the Billboard chart, peaking at no. 95.

The single made an impression in Canada, where it debuted at no. 93 in the RPM Weekly RPM 100 chart for the week of 7 July. The single peaked at no. 72 for the week of 26 August, its final charting week.

"Sally Had a Party" was recorded by New Zealand rock group, The Dedikation as the B side of their 1969 hit "Wait for Me Mary-Anne".

==== Further activities in 1968 ====
The band played at various venues which included playing to an overflow crowd in Washington DC on 1 November 1968.

=== "Heart Teaser" ===
The group recorded the single, "Heart-Teaser" bw "Yea I'm Hip" which was released on Columbia 4-44673 in 1968. Columbia Records ran a full-page ad for the single on page two of the 9 November issue of Cash Box. The single charted, debuting at no. 31 in the Cash Box Looking Ahead chart for the week of 21 December. It peaked at no. 23 the following week. It was a breakout hit for the group. A version was later covered by Big Sir who worked with producer Jim Golden and it was released on the GRT Records label in 1969. That version had a good reception from Cash Box and Record World. A Waukesha, Wisconsin group called The Skunks recorded a version which was released on the Sheri label in 1970.

==== Further activities in 1969 ====
The group released another single, "Coming on Home" bw "Dancing in the Street" on Columbia 4-44881 in 1969.

They played a series of concerts in 1969. Tim O'Brien left Columbia Records for a position as A&R head at Paramount. He worked a deal to bring Flavor to Paramount. They followed him to California and were finding it hard until they got a job at the Flamingo. However, they were still under contract to Columbia and were sent by their label to Las Vegas. While there, they were waiting to be released from Columbia. Sometime later they broke up.

== Discography ==
=== Singles ===
- The Bad Boys – "Love" /"Black Olives" – Paula 254 – 1966
- Flavor – "Sally Had a Party" / "Shop Around" – Columbia 4-44521 – 1968
- Flavor – "Hearteaser" / "Yea I'm Hip" – Columbia 4-44673 – 1968
- Flavor – "Coming on Home" / "Dancing in the Street" – Columbia 4-44881 – 1969

=== Albums ===
- Sally Had a Party: Singles Collection – Collectables CDCOL7648 – 2006
