= The Mauds =

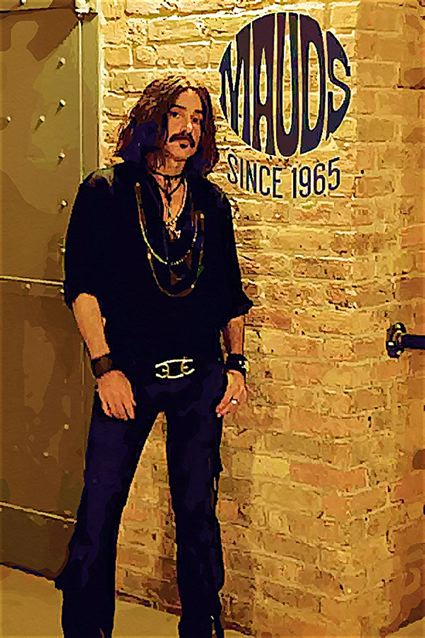
- Jimy Rogers of The Mauds

Background information
- Genres: Jazz rock, blue-eyed soul, blues rock
- Years active: 1965–1971
- Labels: Mercury Records, RCA Records
- Website: themauds.com

The Mauds were an influential band in the 1960s, 1970s Chicago jazz rock, blue-eyed soul, blues rock, garage rock scene that included The Buckinghams, Chicago, Shadows of Knight, and The Ides of March. The Mauds was founded in 1964 by Bill Durling, rhythm guitar. Bill knew Jimy Rogers from 1964 and convinced him to start singing lead for Bill's band. Jimy and Bill then asked Billy Winter, bass, Robert “Fuzzy” Fuscaldo, lead guitar and Craig Baumgard, drums to join and the Mauds were born. These musicians built the Mauds unmistakable Chicago Blue-Eyed Soul Sound c.1965 to 1967. The name Mauds was a play on the 1960s British slang expression "mod", which meant modern. Bill Durling went off to college in Storm Lake, Iowa and was replaced by Timmy Coniglio on rhythm guitar and brass. Then, Craig Baumgard was replaced by Phil Weinberg on drums, and later, Denny Horan replaced Weinberg, and Bill Winter was replaced by Bill Sunter.

== History – band formation and early years ==
It was Shadows frontman/vocalist Jimy Sohns who first discovered and championed The Mauds in 1966. Sohns helped them find gigs and was instrumental in their signing with Dunwich Records distributed by Mercury Records, where in 1967 they gained fame with their debut single, a cover of the Sam & Dave hit "Hold On" penned by David Porter and Isaac Hayes. The song was recorded at the original Chess Studios in Chicago, home to blues giants Willie Dixon, Muddy Waters, Bo Diddley and Chuck Berry. The Rolling Stones had recorded their second album there in 1964. The single charted locally at No. 15 on WCFL and No. 11 on WLS radio. The single might have gone higher, but a censorship controversy erupted when WLS got complaints about the lyrics, “Reach out to me for satisfaction; on my knees for quick reaction.” A cleaned-up version was recorded for WLS but the songs momentum was slowed.

The Mauds recorded "HA HA HA" in 1967. Full album of material was recorded called “Hold On” that yielded several other blue-eyed soul songs, including “When Something is Wrong with my Baby,”“He Will Break Your Heart,” and “Knock On Wood”. The Mauds version of “Mercy, Mercy, Mercy” an instrumental jazz hit by Cannonball Adderley, written by Joe Zawinul had soulful lyrics written by Curtis Mayfield (though credited to Vincent & Gail Fisher Levy) especially for them. Mayfield was so happy with the way they did his “You Must Believe Me,” complete with Impressions-styled harmonies, that he promised to write several songs just for them. Jimy Rogers often lamented that unfortunately, their version was recorded around the same time (1967) as the Buckinghams more famous version, which had different lyrics and ended up being a No. 5 national hit. Two originals were included, “C’mon and Move” by Rogers and Fuscaldo, and “You Made Me Feel So Bad” by Horan and Fuscaldo.

"I rehearsed the first line-up of The Mauds when Jimy was still in high school and hand-picked them to replace us (the Shadows of Knight as the house band) when we left The Cellar (the famous teen club in Arlington Heights, IL) to play other places," said Jimy Sohns while remembering his friend. "Jimy even toured and sang (in my place) with The Shadows when I was sick."

Following "Hold On," in 1968 the Mauds released the biggest single of their career, "Soul Drippin'," which featured the horn section of Walter Parazaider, Lee Loughnane, and Jim Pankow, as well as keyboardist Robert Lamm. “These musicians were so inspired by the recording session that they went on to form their own group, C.T.A., later to become Chicago” Rogers said in an interview. The song charted at "No. 85" on the Billboard singles chart and locally at No.16 on WCFL and No. 12 on WLS radio.

With Jimy Rogers as the leader of the band throughout its lifespan, the band personnel grew and changed in 1969 when Richard Tufo joined on organ, Tim Coniglio left and Denny Spiegel was added with his “outasight screech trumpet” according to an old fan club newsletter. Frank Laurie also played trumpet, and trombone was added with Jim Zollers. Bill Sunter left and was replaced by Mike Schwab. The single “Satisfy My Hunger” featured Rogers on acoustic guitar, and the flip side, “Brother Chickie” was an instrumental featuring Rich Tufo's jazzy organ. Sam Alessi was also on keyboards for a while during this period and again later in 1999 at the Cellar Reunion concert (Arlington Heights, IL).

== The Mauds help create the Chicago sound ==
Unlike his Chicago contemporaries who had a more pop sound and were mostly inspired and influenced by the Beatles, Rogers cooked up a much more soulful musical stew that worked well with his raspy vocal style. Along with other 1960s–1970s rockers, Rogers was a disciple of rhythm and blues and what became known as "the Chicago Sound". While the 'British Invasion' was overtaking American rock music, the Mauds were different from other area bands, according to Bob Stroud's biography, because of the inspiration they found in soul music.

"Lead singer Jimy Rogers possessed the beginnings of a truly legitimate set of blue-eyed soul pipes," wrote Stroud. "Under the cover of night, these five teenage, suburban white boys were sneaking into the various South side soul emporiums to bear witness to their heroes … Sam & Dave, [Otis] Redding and [Curtis] Mayfield." Rogers worked with a variety of stars including Carole King and Stephen Stills, telling friends that "one of the greatest honors" of his career "was being asked to sing at a memorial concert the night Otis Redding was killed".

"I remember watching Jimy and The Mauds back in 1970 at the Wild Goose at an outdoors show in Oak Lawn," said Jim Peterik, of Ides of March. "What a supreme frontman Jimy was. He was one of my role models from that moment on and "Soul Drippin'" is still one of my all–time favorite songs." Dick Biondi, broadcasting legend of WLS (AM), has continued to state “wherever I’ve gone, wherever I’ve worked, one of the best recordings to ever come out of the city of Chicago is “Soul Drippin’ by the Mauds.” It was written by Dick “Daddy Dewdrop” Monda, who sent Jimy an email a few months before Rogers' death, saying: “I just wanted to thank Jimy for his incredible readings of my songs. It changed my life and gave me the impetus to go on with my career.”

In 1970, the band included Marv Jonesi on guitar, Sam Alessi on Hammond organ, Mike Schwab (Groucho) on bass, and Denny Horan on drums. John Belushi and Dan Aykroyd were frequent visitors to the Mauds shows during this period, particularly in the Rush Street bars. It is rumored that the original Blues Brothers skit on Saturday Night Live was a “take off” of the Mauds “White Soul.” The Mauds signed with RCA and recorded a single of Carole King's ballad, “Man Without A Dream.” This proved to be prophetic, as the single failed to get airplay and suddenly it was Jimy Rogers who had become the man without a dream. The Mauds disbanded in 1971, after just a few years and a handful of hits together and the band changed their name to "Flash", leaving Marv Jonesi on guitar, John Christy on Hammond Organ, John Hardy on bass and Marc Coplan on drums playing around Chicago, recording a demo for Columbia records, and trying to make it in L.A.

When they played the legendary Whisky a Go Go in 1971, a review written on May 1, 1971, in Billboard magazine said, “Flash’s set here April 13 was a model for other groups to follow…the final number saw something quite unusual for the Whisky. Rogers walked into the crowd like a troubadour and went from table to table, eventually got the usually staid Whisky crowd harmonizing with the band.” Al Kooper called Rogers, “the next Mick Jagger” and started on a project with Columbia Records that never came to fruition because of Kooper's legal difficulties with the label over Lynyrd Skynyrd. Rogers then retired from the music business temporarily and spent a decade as a hairstylist in L.A. He cut the hair of many celebrities and it is said that he created Barry Manilow’s famous mane.

== Retirement and revival ==
Returning home from California to care for his ailing mother in the 1980s, Jimy Rogers became aware of successful latter day revivals of his '60s–era peers like Shadows of Knight, The Buckinghams and The Ides of March. After his mother died in 1999, Rogers was contacted by concert organizers about reuniting the Mauds for a 1999 show celebrating the Cellar, a legendary '60s music venue in Arlington Heights. He put a band together including Denny Horan on drums, Sam Alesi on keyboards/bass, and James Scalfani on backup vocals. "When we played at a Cellar reunion show … it was like we were back in the 1960s again," Mr. Rogers told the Chicago Tribune. "The crowd was going wild, and it felt so good. It made me remember what a good effect the band had on people."

Inspired to carry the Mauds forward into the new millennium, Rogers formed a new version in 2000 that included Al Ciner (American Breed and Rufus) on guitar, Mike Arnold on keyboards, Jerry Smith (Flock) on bass, and Bob Melville on drums. Gradually personnel were added and changed, and the new Mauds continued playing and recording, including sold-out appearances at Ravinia Festival and the Park West. The 10-piece band during this period was together approximately 8 years and featured Jimy Rogers on lead vocal, Michael Flynn on guitar, Bill LeClair on keyboards, Dave Forte on bass, Chris Drehobl on drums, Quent Lang on sax, Paul Redman on trombone, Steve O’brien on trumpet; Veronica Stanford and Jocelyn Mallard on backup vocals. They put out a live CD, “Soul Attitude” in 2005 and a studio album, “Souldier On” that included guest performances by Howard Levy (Flecktones) on harmonica, Vanessa Davis on vocals, Pat Fleming on guitar, and Greg Rzab (Black Crowes) on bass in 2007. Michael Flynn wrote the single "New day" for The Mauds album "Soul Attitude" Michael Flynn also wrote all the original material on The Mauds album "Souldier On".

The Mauds have had great support throughout the media in Chicago throughout the years. Dick Biondi of WLS has been a fan since the '60s. Bob Stroud of WDRV included “Hold On” on his Rock ‘n’ Roll Roots CD No. 3, and “Soul Drippin’” on CD #5. Bob Sirott, of Channel 11, WTTW included the Mauds as one of the major influences in Chicago rock in his PBS special, Chicago Stories. WGN radio featured an interview with Jimy Rogers in their series, “The Secret History of Chicago Music” which also included an article in the Chicago Reader. Rogers was also featured in the documentary film, “Player: A Rock ‘n’ Roll Dream” by Greg Herriges in 2006.

== Final chapter ==
In 2006, Rogers formed a blues band, Blue Road, with husband and wife team Gary Gand on guitar and Joan Gand on keyboards, Ari Mintz, and then Steve Nevets on bass, Billy Shaffer (Million Dollar Quartet) and then Joel Treadwell on drums, and Graham Nelson on harmonica. Rogers was ready to explore a more rootsy mix of blues and soul, and play in local clubs and bars where the 10 piece band couldn't fit. Blue Road played over 200 shows and recorded several live CDs, and released, “Blue Road Live at Gabe’s Backstage Lounge” to wide acclaim in blues circles. They performed for two years running at Chicago Blues Festival (2009, 2010). The CD was chosen as one of the “top 11” new CDs for 2009 on ChicagoBluesGuide.com, and played on local radio stations, and nationally on XM/Sirius Bluesville. This led to the final incarnation of the Mauds, with Gary and Joan Gand, Steve Nevets on bass, Joel Treadwell (R. Kelly) on drums, and backup singers Jocelyn Mallard and Veronica Stanford. They were featured at a book-release party in November 2009 for Dean Milano's “Chicago Music Scene” book that documented the Mauds and all the Chicago bands from the 60's and 70's. This final lineup of the Mauds only got to play half a dozen shows up until Rogers death in December 2010 from cancer.

== Discography ==
=== Albums ===
- The Mauds Hold On (1967)

=== Singles ===
- Ha Ha Ha(1967) Mercury
- Satisfy My Hunger(1967)
- When Something Is Wrong (With My Baby) (1967)
- Hold On(1967)
- You Must Believe Me / He Will Break Your Heart(1967)
- Only Love Can Save You Now(1968)
- Soul Drippin' (1968) (#48 Can.)
- Man Without A Dream (1971), RCA

== See also ==
- Jazz rock
- Chicago Blues Festival
