= Gary St. Clair (music producer) =

Gary St.Clair
- Born: Gary Reed St.Clair Washington D.C.
- Origin: Washington DC, United States
- Genres: Rock, Pop, R&B
- Occupations: Vocalist, Musician, Songwriter, Record Producer
- Instruments: Vocals, Keyboards, Guitar, Bass
- Years active: 1960s - Present
- Labels: Columbia Records, Paula Records, Paramount Records
- Formerly of: Bad Boys, Flavor

Gary St. Clair is a musician, singer, songwriter and record producer. He was lead singer and songwriter for the groups The Bad Boys (Paula Records) and Flavor (Columbia Records). He followed that with a solo album on Paramount. After retiring as a performer he produced recordings for artists such as All-4-One, Nu Flavor and David Hasselhoff.

== Background ==
Gary St. Clair is originally from Washington DC. His songwriting and production work goes back to the early 1960s.

During the 1960s, Gary St. Clair was the singer and keyboardist in the band Bad Boys. Their single, "Love" bw "Black Olives" was released on the Paula label. Later, he sang lead on the Flavor single, "Sally Had a Party".

Artists that St. Clair has worked with, or have recorded his compositions include, All-4-One, The Chambers Brothers, Roger Troutman, Roy Buchanan, Rena Scott, T.I., The Righteous Brothers, Al Wilson, Papa John Creech, Blue Swede, David Hasselhoff

== Career as artist ==
=== 1960s ===
==== The Bad Boys ====
The Bad Boys was a group that was made up of Gary St. Clair (record producer), Danny Conway and Demetri Callas. The group recorded a single, "Love" bw "Black Olives". Charlie Daniels was arranger for both sides of the record. He also co-produced the recordings with Ray Allen. The musicians that took part in the recording sessions were, Gary St. Clair on organ, Charlie Daniels on bass, Danny Conway on drums, and Demetri Callas on guitar.

Their first single, "Love" bw "Black Olives" released on Paula 254 in 1966. An ad appeared in the 3 December 1966 issue of Cash Box for Jewel / Paula Records. The three singles listed as the Other Hot Singles were, "Things You Do" by Frank Frost, "The Push" by Billy Joe Young, and "Black Olives" by The Bad Boys. The following week, Record World had the record as one of the Sleepers of the Week, referring to it as an organ-paced instrumental that gets down to the nitty gritty and that it should make an impact in the charts. The single, which was in the Cash Box Best Bets section was reviewed in the magazine's 17 December issue, with "Black Olives" as the A side. The reviewer called it a "funky frenetic rock outing" and it was likely to do well for the group. The reviewer also said that the flip side "Love" was a strong rock effort and gave it a B+ rating.

For the week of 17 December, the single was at no. 48 in the Cash Box New to Top 50 in R&B Locations chart, which is a summary of new entries in the Top 50 In R&B Locations chart. The single peaked at no 35 in that chart for the week of 24 December 1966.

The single peaked again at no. 35 in the Top 50 In R&B Locations chart for the week of 7 January 1967. The single debuted at no. 35 in the Cash Box Looking Ahead chart for the week of 28 January 1967. The single peaked at no. 11 for the week of 25 February. It was still in the Looking Ahead chart for the week of 18 March.

==== Flavor ====
In 1967, The Bad Boys were signed by Clive Davis to Columbia Records and renamed Flavor. Their producer was Tim O'Brien, another Washington DC native.

The group recorded the single, "Sally Had a Party" bw "Shop Around", which was released on Columbia 4-44521. It ended up being a hit, peaking at no. 66 on the Cash Box Top 100 for the week of 24 August. It was still charting for the week of 7 September. It also got to no. 81 on the Record World 100 Top Pops chart for the week of 31 August. It also got to no. 95 on the Billboard chart during its five-week run. The single also made the Record World Top 50 R&B chart, peaking at no. 28 for the week of 28 January 1967.

=== As a solo artist ===
In 1970, he was signed to Paramount as a solo artist.

==== Album ====
St. Clair recorded his self-titled album which was released in 1972. It was reviewed in the 19 February issue of Billboard. The review was positive with the shades of Ray Charles and Leon Russell being noted. The backing vocals were provided by Clydie King and Venetta Fields. With AM and FM exposure, the LP was predicted to get on the Top LP chart. It was reported in the 26 February 1972 issue of Record World that his album was getting FM airplay on KOCY-FM in Oklahoma City and KZEL-FM in Eugene, Oregon. A cut from the album, "Jim Dandy" was added to the play list of KEYN in Wichita for the week of 4 March.

Years later, Bob Koch of Isthmus referred to the album as "an excellent example of early '70s soul-influenced rock, sort of a cross of what Joe Cocker and Rod Stewart were up to at the time".

==== Single ====
St. Clair's single, "Dr. Rock and Roll" was released on Paramount 0155 in 1972. It was a Record World Single Pick for the week of 1 April 1972. The reviewer said that in addition to having the magic words of rock and roll, it injected that brand of music into its grooves and will never die.

== Career as producer, composer etc. ==
=== 1960s - 1970s ===
A song he wrote with Tim O'Brien, "Satisfy You" was included on the Chambers Brothers' 1968 album, A New Time – A New Day.

St. Clair was the lead vocalist on the Neil Young song, "Down by the River". by Roy Buchanan on his You’re Not Alone album that was released in 1978, with backing vocalists, Alfa Anderson, David Lasley, Krystal Davis and Luther Vandross.

=== 1980s - 1990s ===
Gary St. Clair composed the songs "(No Parking in My) Love Zone" and "This Love's for You" for Rena Scott. Both were hits for her in 1988 and 1989, peaking on the Billboard r&b charts at no. 93 and 80 respectively.

Working with fellow producers, David Foster and Tim O'Brien, St. Clair co-wrote and produced the 1994 4× Platinum self-titled album, All-4-One. The album peaked at no. 7 for the week of 9 July 1994 during its 28 week run in the Top 50.

St. Clair and Tim O'Brien both composed and produced the "(She’s Got) Skillz" single for All-4-One. It was reviewed in the 7 January 1995 issue of Music & Media. The reviewer pointed out that the song was a major departure from the group's major hit, "I Swear", and that the quartet were now jive talking on top of a great drum sound. The song was a hit, peaking at no. 57 during its twenty-week run.

Working again with Tim O'Brien, St. Clair produced the And the Music Speaks album for All-4-One. It contained the single, "I Can Love You Like That". The album spent fifteen weeks in the US album chart, peaking at no. 27 on 19 August 1995.

He produced the Nu Flavor "Baby Be There" single. It was reviewed in the 16 May 1989 issue of Billboard. It was positive with the reviewer referring to the sax-driven track as "No "freak" chat here" and "Just a little old-fashioned romance, with a dash of Latin spice". The single made the charts in the US, getting to no. 83 on the main chart and no. 101 on the r&b chart.

=== 2000s - present ===
St. Clair produced the 2009 album, @mphibian for Bray.
