= Gloria (Shadows of Knight album) =

Studio album by Shadows of Knight
- Released: April 1966
- Recorded: 1965 – March 1966
- Studio: Universal Recording Corporation, Chicago, Illinois
- Genre: Rock, garage rock, proto-punk
- Length: 38:06
- Label: Dunwich (original release); Radar (UK 1979 release); Sundazed (CD release)

Shadows of Knight chronology
Gloria (1966)	Back Door Men (1966)

Singles from Gloria
- 1. "Gloria" Released: January 1966; 2. "Oh Yeah" Released: May 1966

Professional ratings
Review scores
Source	Rating
AllMusic	4.5/5 stars

Gloria is the first album by the Shadows of Knight, released in 1966 on Dunwich Records 666. The title track, a cover of the song by Them, became the group's biggest hit, reaching number 10 on the Billboard charts.

== Background ==
The band released the Gloria album in the summer of 1966, after releasing "Gloria" as a single backed by "Darkside" in December 1965. The single reached #10 on the Billboard charts in May 1966. Later in the year, "Oh Yeah" was released from the same album as a single backed by "Light Bulb Blues", and charted as high as #39. The album liner notes credit the album as "Produced for Dunwich Records" instead of crediting a specific producer.

== Reception ==
Although the band's association with "Gloria" has caused some to categorize them as one-hit wonders, Cub Koda of AllMusic pushed back against this notion. He reviewed their debut favorably, saying "it positively rocks with a raw energy of a band straight out of the teen clubs, playing with a total abandon and an energy level that seems to explode out of the speakers. Equal parts Rolling Stones, Yardbirds, Who, and snotty little Chicago-suburb bad boys, the Shadows of Knight could easily put the torch to Chess blues classics, which make up the majority of the songs included here. Their wild takes on 'I Just Want to Make Love to You,' 'Oh Yeah,' and 'Got My Mojo Working' rank right up there with any British Invasion band's version from the same time period."

== Track listing ==
1. "Gloria" (Van Morrison) – 2:34
2. "Light Bulb Blues" (Jerry McGeorge, James Alan Sohns, Joseph J. Kelly) – 2:32
3. "I Got My Mojo Working" (McKinley Morganfield) – 3:28
4. "Darkside" (Warren Rogers, James Alan Sohns) – 2:00
5. "Boom Boom" (John Lee Hooker) – 2:28
6. "Let It Rock" (Chuck Berry) – 1:52
7. "Oh Yeah" (Ellas McDaniel) – 2:45
8. "It Always Happens That Way" (Warren Rogers, James Alan Sohns) – 1:52
9. "You Can't Judge a Book by Looking at the Cover" (Willie Dixon) – 2:37
10. "(I'm Your) Hoochie Coochie Man" (Willie Dixon) – 3:52
11. "I Just Want to Make Love to You" (Willie Dixon) – 3:49

=== Bonus tracks on LP and CD reissue, 1998 ===
12. "Oh Yeah" (alternate version); (McDaniel) – 2:45
13. "I Got My Mojo Working" (alternate version); (Morganfield) – 3:14
14. "Someone Like Me" (single release not on original album); (David MacDowell, Rich Novak) – 2:18

== Personnel ==
Shadows of Knight

- James Alan Sohns – vocals
- Warren Rogers – lead guitar, backing vocals
- Jerry McGeorge – rhythm guitar, backing vocals
- Joseph J. Kelly – bass guitar
- Tom Schiffour – drums

Technical

- Bob Kidder – engineer
- Jerry DeClercq – mastering
- Ron Fratell – art direction
- Don Bronstein – cover photograph

== Chart performance ==
=== Album ===
Chart (1966)	Peak position	Total weeks
U.S. Billboard 200	46	18

=== Singles ===
Year	Single	Chart	Position
1966	"Gloria"	Billboard Hot 100	10
1966	"Oh Yeah!"	Billboard Hot 100	39
