= The Shadows of Knight =

American rock band

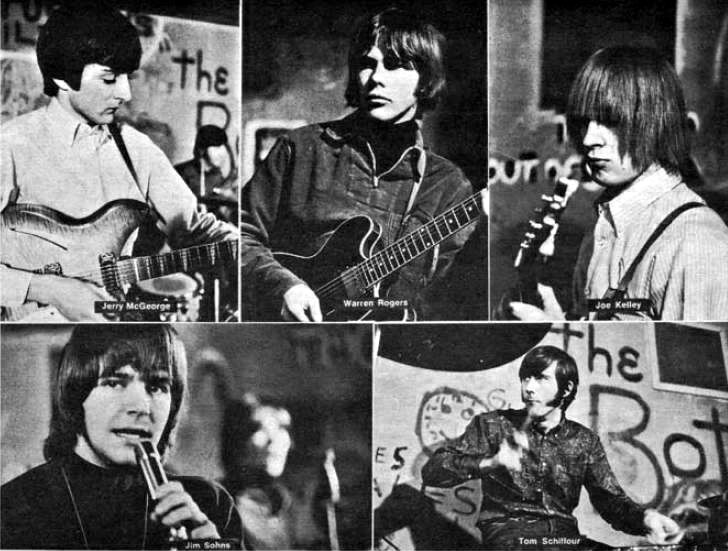
- The band in 1966. Top, from left: Jerry McGeorge, Warren Rogers, Joe Kelley. Bottom from left: Jim Sohns and Tom Schiffour.

Background information
- Origin: Chicago, Illinois, U.S.
- Genres: Garage rock; psychedelic rock; hard rock; pop rock; blues rock; rhythm & blues
- Years active: 1964–2022
- Labels: Dunwich; Radar; Team; Sundazed; Rhino; Atlantic; Atco; Collectables; Wicked Cool
- Past members: Jim Sohns; Lee Brovitz; Michael Campbell; Jerry McGeorge; Warren Rogers; Joe Kelley; Tom Schiffour; Wayne Pursell; Norm Gotsch; David "Hawk" Wolinski; Michael Weber; Jeff Millar-Sax; Michael Gotshall; Cindy Gotshall
- Website: Shadows Of Knight Official Facebook

The Shadows of Knight were an American rock band from Chicago, Illinois, that played a version of British blues influenced by their native city.

The Shadows of Knight saw regional success with a cover of Them's 1964 single "Gloria", which peaked at number 10 on the Billboard Hot 100 chart in the spring of 1966. In 1972, Lenny Kaye coined the term "garage punk" on the track-by-track liner notes for the Nuggets compilation, describing the Shadows of Knight's follow-up single "Oh Yeah", which opens side two of the anthology, as "classic garage punk".

== History ==
=== 1960s ===
The band was formed in 1964 as simply the Shadows. In the spring of 1965, the band learned of an already existing British group, the Shadows. Whiz Winters, a friend who worked for their manager, Paul Sampson, in his record shop, came up with the name "The Shadows of Knight" to tie into the British Invasion in music of that time, and because four of the band members attended Prospect High School in Mt. Prospect, Illinois, whose sports team had the name "The Knights".

Founding members included Jim Sohns (vocals; 1964–2022), Warren Rogers (lead guitar), Norm Gotsch (rhythm guitar), Wayne Pursell (bass guitar), and Tom Schiffour (drums). They released three albums in their first five years of existence. In early Fall 1965, Pursell left the band to attend college. Subsequently, Joe Kelley was recruited to play bass. Kelley would swap bass and lead duties with Rogers in late 1965 at the time of the "Gloria" recordings. Guitarist and vocalist Jerry McGeorge replaced Norm Gotsch in late 1965 after Gotsch joined the U.S. Navy, serving in Vietnam during his tour of duty. David "Hawk" Wolinski, who later worked with Rufus and Chaka Khan, replaced Rogers on bass in late 1966.

After performing in and around Chicago's northwest suburbs in 1964 and 1965, The Shadows of Knight became the house band at The Cellar in Arlington Heights, Illinois, owned by Sampson. They attracted more than 500 teenagers every Saturday and Sunday at the "Cellar" for more than six months until Sampson began booking other bands, giving them a break. (A recording of a Shadows of Knight performance at The Cellar was released in 2018 by Sundazed Music as Alive in '65, showcasing the five original members of the band.)

A stellar performance in support of the Byrds at Chicago's McCormick Place in early summer 1965 attracted the attention of Dunwich Records record producers Bill Traut and George Badonski. During that show, they performed "Gloria" by Van Morrison's band Them. The band signed with Dunwich shortly thereafter and recorded "Gloria" as a first effort.

Released in December 1965, "Gloria" received regional airplay. The band had slightly altered the song's lyrics, replacing Morrison's original "she comes to my room, then she made me feel alright" with "she called out my name, that made me feel alright" after influential Chicago station WLS had banned Them's original version. This simple change overcame the prevalent AM radio censorship of the era and got The Shadows of Knight's cover version of the song onto the playlist of WLS. The single reached the No. 1 position on the radio station's countdown, as well as on local rival WCFL. On the Billboard national charts, "Gloria" rose to No. 10. The secondary publication Cashbox ranked "Gloria" as high as No. 7. In Canada the song reached No. 8 on the RPM Magazine charts. "Gloria" sold over one million copies, and was awarded a gold disc by the RIAA.

The Shadows of Knight soon released the Gloria album, followed by the Back Door Men LP, in the summer of 1966. Subsequent singles included their version of the Bo Diddley song "Oh Yeah" (which reached No. 39 nationally), "Bad Little Woman" (No. 91), and the powerhouse "I'm Gonna Make You Mine" (No. 90). However, none of these releases approached their initial commercial success. Failure to find a winning follow-up to "Gloria" handicapped the band's earning power and led to its disintegration. Tom Schiffour left the band in spring 1967, first to be replaced by a young local fan of the band, Bruce Bruscato. He was subsequently replaced by Tom Morris. The original band fragmented further when McGeorge departed for acid-rock band H.P. Lovecraft, while Kelley left to front his own blues band. Hawk Wolinski also left the band to form Bangor Flying Circus with Schiffour and guitarist Alan De Carlo.

By mid-1967, the only original member of the Shadows of Knight remaining was vocalist Jim Sohns, who trademarked the band name and inherited the groups's legacy. In the second generation of the band he was joined by Kenny Turkin on drums and vocals, Steve (Woody) Woodruff on lead guitar and vocals, Dan Baughman on rhythm guitar and vocals, and John Fisher on bass guitar and vocals. This generation of the band would perform together for the next 18 months. Sohns signed the band with Buddah Records in New York. Sohns had hoped to take the band in a British power-rock direction, but the Super K record label pulled them into a more commercial orientation, pairing the band with bubblegum groups such as the 1910 Fruitgum Company and the Ohio Express on tour. In 1969, the second generation Shadows of Knight released "Shake" on Buddha's short-lived subsidiary Team Records; the track eventually climbed to No. 46 (No. 37 Canada, December 1968). That same year, without the band's knowledge or consent, the unsuccessful update "Gloria '69" was released by Dunwich.

"Shake" and its B-side, "From Way Out to Way Under" were actually recorded by Sohns and a number of studio musicians, on the understanding that a Shadows of Knight reassembled by Sohns would record a follow-up album. That album, Shadows of Knight is today regarded as a distinct recording oddity, being an attempt to mix punk and bubblegum music. From 1960s to 1970s, Chicago jazz rock, blue-eyed soul, blues rock, garage rock scene that included the Shadows of Knight, Chicago, The Buckinghams, the Mauds and The Ides of March.

=== 1970s–1980s ===
The four years after the breakup of the original Shadows were a dark creative period with little financial success. The band's repertoire consisted mostly of pop cover songs, which allowed them to survive by playing clubs. The second iteration of the band continued to evolve. Baughman left to pursue a career in metal sculpture. Turkin was replaced in early 1969 by Paul Scarpelli, and in 1970 Jack "Hawkeye" Daniels replaced Woodruff on guitar. The band's lineup remained the same for two years. During that time it recorded "I Am the Hunter." John Fisher was replaced by Jorge Gonzales on bass in 1971, who was subsequently replaced by John Hardy the next year. He was then replaced by studio bassist Don Ferrone.

In 1972, Nuggets was created by Lenny Kaye, and the album included the Shadows of Knight's 1966 "Oh Yeah". Over subsequent decades, Sohns fronted varying incarnations of the group on the oldies circuit. He also spent a period of time reflecting on his future in the music business, choosing to become the road manager of the band Skafish from 1978 to 1980. He would join the band to sing "Gloria" as the band's encore.

=== 1990s ===
The Shadows of Knight enjoyed renewed public interest during the 1990s, significantly due to the 1998 release of their first two albums, remastered by Sundazed Music. In 1992, Performance Records (aka "Donewitch" Records) released The Shadows Of Knight – Live, Featuring "Gloria". This was a previously unreleased performance recorded live in Rockford, Illinois, in 1972. The album is also noted as containing "a wonderfully blistering guitar-laced extended version of Willie Dixon's 'I Just Want to Make Love to You'", which is nearly twelve minutes long. Also in 1992, another live recording, Raw 'n' Alive at The Cellar, 1966, was released by Sundazed Music. As noted by Richie Unterberger, "This is one of the very few live garage band tapes from the mid-'60s of relatively decent sound quality (considering the standards of the era). The song selection of this set should also please fans of one of the most famed '60s garage bands, captured here at a club in their home turf of Chicago in December 1966." In 1994, Rhino Records released Dark Sides: The Best of The Shadows of Knight. Unterberger had mixed feelings about this collection, particularly in view of the absence of "I Just Want to Make Love to You".

=== 2000s ===
In 2006, the Shadows of Knight headlined Little Steven's cross-country "Underground Garage" tour with The Romantics. The Shadows also joined Cheap Trick's Halloween show ("Cheap Trick or Treat"), along with guest appearances by members of the Romantics and the Charms. This performance was subsequently televised on VH-1 Classic. At shows on the 2006 tour, they were joined onstage at various times by Rick Mullen (of Van Morrison, Commander Cody, Don McLean), Vince Martell (Vanilla Fudge), Mark Stein (Vanilla Fudge), and members of The Romantics. Also in 2006, a CD of new material, A Knight to Remember, was released co-produced by Lee Brovitz and Bobby Messano. Brovitz wrote, produced and oublished most of the songs. Messano played all of the guitars and assisted with background vocals on the album.The band continued touring with Lee Brovitz on bass/vocals, Michael Campbell on drums/vocals and Bobby Messano on guitar

In 2008, the band toured as part of "The Psychedelic Shack Tour", which also featured a re-formed Nazz, Vince Martell and, on occasion, Henry Gross. Also in 2008, a new CD was released, Rock 'n' Roll Survivors, containing a further reworking of "Gloria", all produced by Lee Brovitz. The Sohns-Brovitz partnership split during this time period but Brovitz retained the trademark. Lee Brovitz continues his career as a solo artist.

=== 2010s–2020s ===
Joe Kelley died on September 1, 2013, shortly after being diagnosed with lung cancer. He was 67.

On August 20, 2016, in celebration of Sohns' 70th birthday and the 50th anniversary of the release of "Gloria", a reunion concert took place in Arlington Heights, Illinois, reuniting Sohns with original band members Tom Schiffour, Jerry McGeorge and Hawk Wolinski. A recording of the performance was released in 2020 by Giving Shelter, Produced by Jeff Millar-Sax.

On May 27, 2020, classic-era members Jimy Sohns and Jerry McGeorge teamed up with producer/musician Michael Weber to release their first new single together in 53 years, "Wild Man." On November 6, 2020, the record, along with its B-side remake of "I Ain't Got You", was released on Steven Van Zandt's Wicked Cool Records and debuted the following week on SiriusXM's Underground Garage.

In March 2022, Jimy Sohns released his only solo single in collaboration with Jon Povey (ex-Pretty Things) and the Technicolour Dream, an Italian neo-psychedelic band active from the late 1970s, who released three albums with Twink in 2013–2019. The single includes two garage / psychedelic songs, "Born Again" and "Isis Calling", both written by Marco Conti and Fabio Porretti of the Technicolour Dream and Jon Povey.

Lead singer and original member James "Jimy" Sohns (born on August 23, 1946, in Chicago) died of complications from a stroke on July 29, 2022, at age 75.

Tom Schiffour, drummer, passed away January, 2025.

== Legacy ==
When they began recording in 1965, the band's self-description was "the Stones, Animals and the Yardbirds took the Chicago blues and gave it an English interpretation. We've taken the English version of the Blues and re-added a Chicago touch," to which rock critic Richie Unterberger commented: "The Shadows of Knight's self-description was fairly accurate."

== Band members ==
- Jim Sohns – vocals (1964–2022; died 2022)
- Warren Rogers – bass, lead guitar, vocals (1964–1967, 2024)
- Tom Schiffour – drums (1964–1967, 2016; died 2025)
- Jerry McGeorge – rhythm guitar, backing vocals (1965–1967, 2016, 2020, 2024)
- Joe Kelley – lead guitar (1965–1967; died 2013)
- Hawk Wolinski – bass, keyboards (1966–1967, 2015, 2016)
- Lee Brovitz – bass, vocals (1972-1975 : 1988-2009)
- Norm Gotsch – rhythm guitar (1964–1965, 2024)
- Wayne Pursell – bass (1964–1965)
- Michael Weber – lead guitar, backing vocals, drums, keyboard (2013–2022)
- Jeff Millar Sax - percussion, keys, guitar, backing vocals (2012 - 2022)
- Michael Gotshall - lead guitar, backing vocals (1986 - 2022)
- Cindy Gotshall - keyboards, backing vocals (1986 - 2022)

== Discography ==
=== Singles ===
Year	Title	US Hot 100	US Cash Box	Album	Label
1966	"Gloria" "Dark Side"	10	7	Gloria	Dunwich Records D-116
1966	"Oh Yeah" "Light Bulb Blues "	39	—	Gloria	Dunwich Records D-122
1966	"Bad Little Woman" "Gospel Zone"	91	100	Back Door Men	Dunwich Records D-128
1966	"I'm Gonna Make You Mine" "I'll Make You Sorry "	90	—	Non-album single Back Door Men	Dunwich Records D-141
1967	"Willie Jean" "The Behemoth"	—	—	Non-album single Back Door Men	Dunwich Records D-151
1967	"Someone Like Me" "Three For Love"	—	—	Non-album single	Dunwich Records D-167
1968	"Shake" "From Way Out To Way Under"	46	60	Non-album single	Team Records 520
1969	"My Fire Department Needs A Fireman" "Taurus"	—	—	Non-album single	Super K Records SK8
1969	"Run Run Billy Porter " "My Fire Department Needs A Fireman"	—	—	Non-album single	Super K Records SK10
1970	"I Am the Hunter" "Warwick Court Affair"	—	—	Non-album single	Atco 45-6776
2020	"Wild Man" "I Ain't Got You"	—	—	Non-album single	Wicked Cool WKC-69012-1

=== Studio albums ===
Year	Title	Label
1966	Gloria	Dunwich Records 666
1966	Back Door Men	Dunwich Records 667
1969	Shadows of Knight	Super K SKS 6002
2007	A Knight To Remember	Bassic-Lee Music

=== Live albums ===
Year	Title	Label
1992	Raw 'n Alive at the Cellar, Chicago 1966!	Sundazed Music SC 11013
1992	Live! (In Rockford, IL. 1972)	Performance Records DONE 5CD
2015	Live 1966	Sundazed Music
2018	Alive in '65	Sundazed Music
2020	50th Anniversary Reunion Concert	Giving Shelter

== See also ==
- Blue-eyed soul
- Protopunk
