= The Dedikation =

- Origin: Upper Hutt, New Zealand
- Genres: Rock
- Years active: 1967 - 1970
- Labels: Polydor, Philips
- Spinoff of: The Crescendos
- Past members: Graeme Collins; Graham Harvey; Ray Ahipene-Mercer; Bruce Whitelaw

The Dedikation was a New Zealand rock band that was active during the 1960s. They had a couple of national hits during that period. They are mostly remembered for their version of "Wait for Me Mary-Anne".

== Background ==
=== The Crescendos ===
The history of The Dedikation can be traced back to a high school band called The Crescendos that was formed in 1963 by Ray Mercer, lead guitarist and singer, and Graeme Collins, an organist and singer. Their friends, Wayne Marsh and Mike Martin also came on board.

==== Line up ====
- Graeme Collins - keyboards, vocals
- Graham Harvey - bass guitar
- Mike Martin - ?
- Wayne Clifford-Marsh - ?
- Ray Ahipene-Mercer - lead guitar, vocals

=== The Dedikation ===
The group came into being around 1967 in New Zealand's Upper Hutt. The former Crescendos members got together with drummer Michael Parlane.

At some stage, Parlane was replaced by Bruce Whitelaw.

== Career ==
From 1967, the group played the dancehall circuit and built up a reputation. When it came time for them to go professional, drummer Parlane left and was replaced by an eighteen-year-old Bruce Whitelaw who had been with The State of Mind, a band from Invercargill. The group's debut single, "Hayride" bw "Bare Footin" was released. The record did pick up national airplay but didn't make the charts.

In September, 1969, they had success with their version of "Wait For Me Mary-Anne", a song previously recorded by The Marmalade. The song was backed with "Sally Had a Party". The Dedikation version made it to no. 2 in New Zealand. Spending three months in the charts, it was kept off the no. 1 spot by the Beatles' "Something".

Their last single was a cover of the Rolling Stones song, "Ruby Tuesday". It did make the national charts and peaked at no. 12.

In 1969, the group performed at the Fosters Hotel in Wanganui. They released their album that year.

They broke up in 1970.

== Line up ==
- Graeme Collins - keyboards, vocals
- Graham Harvey - bass guitar
- Ray Mercer - lead guitar, vocals
- Michael Parlane - drums (replaced by Bruce Whitelaw)
- Bruce Whitelaw - drums

== Discography ==
=== Singles ===
- The Dedikation - "Hayride" / "Bare Footin' - Polydor 425211 - 1969
- The Dedikation - "Wait for Me Mary-Anne" / "Sally Had a Party" - Polydor 425213 - 1969
- The Dedikation - "Ruby Tuesday" / "Be a Woman" - Polydor 425224 - 1969

=== Albums ===
- Dedication - Philips BY 843088 - 1969
- Dedication - Breeder Backtrack Archive Series BY 843088 - 2001 (Unofficial Austrian LP release)

=== Appearances ===
- Upside Down: Coloured Dreams from the Underworld: Volume Seven 1965-1970, PARTCD4101
