= The Cellar (teen dance club) =

Music venue in Arlington Heights, Illinois (1964–1970)

The Cellar was a short-lived music venue in Arlington Heights, Illinois outside of Chicago that provided live early rock music in the mid-1960s to young people in the Chicago area. Founded in 1964 by Paul Sampson, a local record store owner who later became a music promoter and manager, The Cellar primarily featured early rock and roll acts, although some Chicago blues bands also performed there. The Cellar closed in 1970.

== Locations ==
The Cellar was first located in the basement (thus the name) of the old St. Peter's Lutheran Church at 116 W. Eastman St. It later moved to the empty Bill Cook Buick at 835 W. Davis, across the tracks from the old Arlington High School. The unused warehouse was located along the Chicago and Northwestern railroad tracks (42.087271°N 87.991744°W).

== Rock and roll youth culture legacy ==
The Cellar became a popular venue, providing teenagers from the region with a place to congregate, listen to British-tinged Chicago blues rock, and to dance. It also hosted talented psychedelic rock regional house bands, such as the Shadows of Knight (who recorded their Raw 'n' Alive at the Cellar, Chicago 1966! album there), The Ides of March, The Buckinghams, Fuse, The Mauds, Chicago Transit Authority, H.P. Lovecraft, Saturday's Children, Ted Nugent with The Amboy Dukes, The Huns, The Flock, The Raevns, The Other Half, and The Little Boy Blues.

Despite the fact that it was a modest warehouse in a northwestern suburb of Chicago, The Cellar attracted national and international rock bands, such as The Who, Cream, The Byrds, Buffalo Springfield, The Spencer Davis Group, Three Dog Night, The Steve Miller Band, and the MC5.

The Cellar provided Chicago-area garage rock bands with a stage and a teen audience eager to hear their loud rock music. Once on the stage, these groups gained regional and, in some cases (such as the Shadows of Knight), national followings. Furthermore, it provided these local groups with the extraordinary opportunity to open for the major acts who also played there, such as H.P. Lovecraft opening for The Who on June 15, 1967.

== Sources ==
- Davis, Jon. "'Feelin' Groovy' Exhibit Takes Graphic Trip back to the 60s." Daily Herald [Arlington Heights, Illinois] (October 2001)
- Lind, Jeff. "History of Chicago Rock." Illinois Entertainer (July 1978)
- Mart, Teresa. "Crossing Centuries -- Our Suburbs: Celebrities Have Roots in Local Communities." Daily Herald [Arlington Heights, Illinois] (December 28, 1999)
- Hill, Laura E. "When The Northwest Suburbs Rocked" Chicago Tribune (Section 17, Tempo Northwest)(December 31, 1995)
