= Make Your Move (album) =

Studio album by Captain & Tennille
- Released: October 1, 1979
- Studios: Rumbo (Los Angeles); Capitol (Hollywood); Group IV Recording (Hollywood); The Village (Los Angeles)
- Genre: Disco
- Length: 41:30
- Label: Casablanca
- Producer: Daryl Dragon

Captain & Tennille chronology
Dream (1978)	Make Your Move (1979)	Keeping Our Love Warm (1980)

Professional ratings
Review scores
Source	Rating
AllMusic	3/5 stars

Make Your Move is the fifth album by the American duo Captain & Tennille. Released in 1979, the album peaked at number 23 on the Billboard Top 200 albums chart. It includes the number-one hit single "Do That to Me One More Time". The album, the duo's first on Casablanca Records, was certified Gold by the RIAA.

The song "Happy Together (A Fantasy)" is a cover of the 1967 number-one hit "Happy Together" by the Turtles.

== Track listing ==
No.	Title	Writer(s)	Length
1.	"Love on a Shoestring"	Kerry Chater, Douglas L.A. Foxworthy	3:37
2.	"No Love in the Morning"	Robert Bellarmine Byrne	4:05
3.	"Deep in the Dark"	Toni Tennille	5:28
4.	"How Can You Be So Cold"	Toni Tennille	7:04
5.	"Do That to Me One More Time"	Toni Tennille	4:17
6.	"Happy Together (A Fantasy)"	Alan Gordon, Garry Bonner	5:26
7.	"Baby You Still Got It"	Toni Tennille	5:32
8.	"Never Make a Move Too Soon"	Nesbert Hooper Jr., Will Jennings	5:57
Total length:			41:30

== Charting singles ==
Year	Single	US	US AC	UK
1980	"Do That to Me One More Time"	1	4	7
1980	"Love on a Shoestring"	55	-	-
1980	"Happy Together (A Fantasy)"	53	27	-

== Personnel ==
Credits sourced from the original album liner notes.

Captain & Tennille

- Toni Tennille - lead (all tracks) and backing vocals (1, 2, 6, 7), piano (3, 7), Fender Rhodes electric piano (5)
- Daryl Dragon - piano (1, 4, 6–8), clavinet (1, 2, 4, 6), Hammond organ (1, 6–8), Fender Rhodes electric piano (2, 4, 8), ARP Odyssey (1, 2, 4), ARP Omni (1, 2), EU synthesizer (2, 4, 6), ARP String Ensemble (3), Yamaha TRX (3, 6), Minimoog (3), Oberheim Four Voice (5–7), Oberheim OB-1 (8), electric (2, 4, 6) and acoustic guitars (1), bass guitar (4, 6, 7), tambourine (1, 2, 6), castanets (2), vibraphone (4, 7)

Additional musicians

- Lee Ritenour - electric (1) and acoustic guitars (5)
- Fred Tackett - electric guitar (8)
- Abraham Laboriel - bass guitar (1, 2, 8)
- Scott Edwards - bass guitar (5, 7)
- Ralph Humphrey - drums (1, 4–8)
- Jim Gordon - drums (2)
- Hal Blaine - drums (3), percussion (3)
- Ken Watson - congas (4, 8), triangle (6), tambourine (8), cowbell (8), percussion (5, 6)
- Tom Scott - alto (2, 3) and tenor saxophones (7), Lyricon (5, 7)
- Bobby Bryant - trumpet (4, 6–8)
- John Rosenberg - trumpet (7)
- Garnett Brown - trombone (4, 6–8)
- Fred Selden - alto saxophone (4, 6–8)
- Glen Garrett - tenor saxophone (4, 6–8)
- John Mitchell - baritone saxophone (4, 6–8)
- Ron Hicklin - backing vocals (1, 2)
- Oren Waters - backing vocals (1, 2)
- Mitch Gordon - backing vocals (1, 2)
- Melissa Boettner - backing vocals (6)
- Lenard Allen - backing vocals (6)
- Gary Sims - backing vocals (6)
