= The Def Dames =

American hip hop group

Def Dames
- Also known as: Touch, Ace Senorita, Klass Act
- Origin: Kern County, Bakersfield, California, United States
- Genres: West Coast hip hop, dance music, bass music, funk
- Years active: (1987–1992)
- Labels: Sedona Recording Co. BMG
- Past members: "Kandy Kane"; "Special T aka Ace Senorita"
- Website: myspace.com/defdames/music/songs

Def Dames were an American female rap duo from Bakersfield, California. The duo consisted of Marilyn Smith, known as "Kandy Kane" she also goes by her Sacramento alias "Touch," and Yolanda Sugart, known as "Special T" or "The Ace Senorita." She was replaced by Petrina Walker known as "Larissa" in 1991, now residing in Las Vegas, Nv. The Def Dames are best known for their first album, 2-4-The Bass, and their three top singles: "976 Boom," "Set it Off," and "The King of Romance," from the late 1980s and early 1990s.

== History ==
The Def Dames was founded in Bakersfield, California by former "Black Diamond" and "Uncle Famous Band" member, Stephen Ewers, he is best known by his stage name DJ Sparkle, in the mid-to-late 1980s. The original Def Dames duo consisted of Marilyn Smith, best known by her stage name Kandy Kane. who generated a local buzz at the time and caught the attention of local hip hop music producer DJ Sparkle. The other member of the duo was Yolanda Sugart, who is known (as Special T.), or by her alias the Ace Senorita. Due to monetary disputes Special T quit the Def Dames, and was later replaced by Petrina Walker aka (Larissa) also known as Pretty Poizon, who made her first appearance with the Def Dames filling in for Special T, in "The King of Romance" video in 1991. The Def Dames is also among the first female rap duo's from the Central Valley, and the first ever from Bakersfield to make the Top 20 on the Billboard's Hot Rap Singles chart. The Def Dames is known for their six releases and remixes they did of popular Top-40 hits in the late 80s and early 90s. The group released two albums: 2-4-The Bass, and 2-Large. They also released four singles: "Set it Off," "976 Boom," "The King of Romance," and "Whip It," a remake of Devo's popular song. They also released "Irresistible Bitch," a remix of the original track by Prince.

In 1989 the Def Dames signed a deal with the "Sedona Recording Company" a division of the Bertelsmann Music Group, and recorded their debut album, 2-4-The Bass. The 2-4-The bass album was written and produced by Stephen "DJ Sparkle" Ewers. The "2-4-The Bass," album was the only album by the Def Dames that made the Billboards R&B Albums Charts to date. The "2-4-The Bass," album debuted at No. #76. The album's first single, "976-Boom," peaked at No. #19 on Billboard's Hot Rap Singles chart, their highest chart appearance to date. The follow-up single, "Set it Off," peaked at No. #20. That same year, DJ Sparkle and The Def Dames performed live in concert at the Throw Down Fest 89 Dance Concert. The event was presented by North Side Records and Mix-Tapes, and powered by radio stations B95 (94.9 FM), and KUFW (90.5 FM). The concert was held at the Visalia Convention Center. The Def Dames shared the stage with artist such as Bay Area performer Colin, Fresno freestyle performer Timmy T and Bakersfield's DJ. Sparkle was also among the performing acts; he took first place in the battle of the deejay's competition.

In 1991, the duo released their sophomore album, 2-Large, written by the Def Dames and produced by DJ Gil. It did not make Billboard's R&B albums chart. The only single to chart from 2-Large was "The King of Romance," which peaked at #26 on Billboard's Hot Rap Singles chart. The other single release from the album, "Whip It," did not chart. In October of that year the Def Dames had performed at the pay-per-view concert event called Sisters In The Name of Rap they performed "Set it Off " live. Also featured at the historic rap event were some of hip hop's legendary female artists from both the east and west coasts, including Salt-N-Pepa, Queen Latifah, Yo-Yo, MC Lyte, Roxanne Shante, Tam Tam, and Shelly Thunder. The event was a pay-per-view TV concert produced and directed by Chris Balton Productions. The show was hosted by Dee Barnes, and taped in front of live audience at The Ritz in New York City.

In 1992 the Def Dames' single "Set it Off" appeared on the Various Artists: – 1st Ladies Of Rap CD compilation. Also featured were other popular hits by early female rap artists such as:"Ladies First (song)" by (Queen Latifah), featuring Monie Love; "I Wanna.. Make You Mine by (MC Trouble); "Smooth & Legit," by (MC Smooth); "Daddy's Little Girl" by (Nikki D); "We In The House" by (J.J. Fad); "We Like It" by (Oaktown's 3-5-7); "Pump It Up ...Get Busy" by Get Fresh Girls; and "Monie In The Middle" by British hip hop star Monie Love. The Def Dames single "Set it Off," along with Tony! Toni! Toné!'s smash hit, "Feels Good," were featured on the TV sitcom In Living Color's Season 2 episode 1–4, titled Fly Girls. The Def Dames are also west coast hip hop pioneers, in terms of being female rappers and is also among the first female rap duo's from Central California to chart on the mainstream rap Billboard's "r&b albums" and "hot rap singles" charts. The Def Dames is arguably the first female rap duo to emerge from the Central Valley coming out of Kern County.

== Discography ==
=== Albums ===
- 2-4-The Bass (1989)
- 2-Large (1991)

=== Appearances ===
- Various artists: – 1st Ladies Of Rap CD compilation (1992)
- SDR Compilation (2007)
- Pay-per-view concert - "Sisters In The Name of Rap" (1991)
- Living Color - "Fly Girls," Season 2. Episode 1-4 (1991)

=== Singles ===
Year	Single	Peak chart positions	Album	
Year	Single	U.S.	Album	
1989	"976 Boom"	19	2-4-The Bass	
1989	"Set it Off"	20	2-4-The Bass	
1991	"The King of Romance"	26	2-4-The Bass	2-Large
1991	"Whip It"	—	2-4-The Bass	2-Large
"—" denotes releases that did not chart or were not released in that country.				2-Large
