= Back Door Men =

Studio album by Shadows of Knight
- Released: October 1966
- Studio: Universal Recording Corp. (Chicago)
- Genre: Garage rock
- Length: 43:27
- Label: Dunwich

Shadows of Knight chronology
Gloria (1966)	Back Door Men (1966)	Shadows of Knight (1969)

Singles from Back Door Men
- 1. "Bad Little Woman" Released: August 1966

Professional ratings
Review scores
Source	Rating
Allmusic	4.5/5 stars

Back Door Men is the second album by the Shadows of Knight.

== Background ==
Back Door Men was recorded at Universal Recording in Chicago, Illinois, in late 1966. The album was recorded as a quick follow-up to the Shadows of Night # 10 debut release Gloria. By the time of this recording, Warren Rogers and Joe Kelley had traded instruments and David Wolinski had been added on keyboards. "Bad Little Woman", a cover of the Belfast band The Wheels, backed by "Gospel Zone" was released as the first single, but only charted as high as # 91. A second single, "I'm Gonna Make You Mine", a non-album cut backed by "I'll Make You Sorry" did only slightly better at # 90. A third single at that time, "Willie Jean" (a Hoyt Axton tune incorrectly identified on the label as "traditional")/"The Behemoth" did not chart. As with their first album, production was credited as "Produced for Dunwich Records" instead of crediting a specific producer. The original album incorrectly lists Dino Valenti as the composer for "Hey Joe".

== Reception ==
In a retrospective review for AllMusic, Bruce Eder noted "the original LP version of this album, the second by the legendary white Chicago garage punk/blues outfit, was one of the most sought-after artifacts of mid-'60s punk rock. Back Door Men was a loud, feedback-laden, sneering piece of rock & roll defiance, mixing raunchy anthems to teenage lust (Gospel Zone', 'Bad Little Woman'), covers of Chicago blues classics (Willie Dixon's 'Spoonful', Jimmy Reed's 'Peepin' and Hidin'), raga rock ('The Behemoth'), folk-rock ('Hey Joe', 'Three for Love', 'I'll Make You Sorry'), and a blues-punk grab off of commercial Top 40 ('Tomorrow's Gonna Be Another Day'), all on one 12" platter. What makes the record even more startling is that every one of these tracks, however far afield they go from one another, works."

== Track listing ==
1. "Bad Little Woman" (Herbie Armstrong, Victor Catling, Rod Demick, Brian Rosbotham, Tito Tinsley) – 2:37
2. "Gospel Zone" (Tom Schiffour) – 3:19
3. "The Behemoth" (Harry Pye) – 2:34
4. "Three for Love" (Joseph J. Kelly) – 3:11
5. "Hey Joe" (Billy Roberts) – 5:42
6. "I'll Make You Sorry" (Kelly) – 2:42
7. "Peepin' and Hidin'" (Jimmy Reed) - 3:01
8. "Tomorrow's Going to Be Another Day" (Tommy Boyce) – 2:23
9. "New York Bullseye" (Harry Pye) – 2:43
10. "High Blood Pressure" (Huey "Piano" Smith, Johnny Vincent) – 3:38
11. "Spoonful" (Willie Dixon) – 2:57

=== Bonus tracks on LP and CD reissue, 1998 ===
12. "Gospel Zone" (single version) (Schiffour) – 3:20
13. "Willie Jean" (single) (Hoyt Axton, incorrectly identified as "Traditional; arranged by Harry Pye") – 2:50
14. "I'm Gonna Make You Mine" (single) (William Carr, Carl D'Errico, Carole Bayer Sager) – 2:30

== Personnel ==
Shadows of Knight

- David "Hawk" Wolinski – organ, piano, keyboards on "Bad Little Woman", "Hey Joe", "Peepin' and Hidin'" and "New York Bullseye"
- Joseph J. Kelly – guitar, harmonica, harp
- Jerry McGeorge – guitar, rhythm guitar, feedback
- Warren Rogers – bass guitar
- Tom Schiffour – drums
- James Alan Sohns – maracas, marimba, tambourine, vocals

Technical

- Bob Kidder – engineer
- Bob Irwin – mastering
- Rich Russell – package design
- Clark Besch – graphic design, photography
- Steve Besch – graphic design, photography
- Paul Hippensteel – graphic design, photography
- Jeff Jarema – graphic design, photography
- Tim Livingston – project manager
- Don Bronstein - cover photography

== Chart performances ==
=== Single ===
Year	Single	Chart	Position
1966	"Bad Little Woman"	Billboard Hot 100	91
