= Wait for Me Mary-Anne =

"Wait for Me Mary-Anne" was a hit single in the late 1960s for Scottish group The Marmalade as well as New Zealand group The Dedikation.

== Overview ==
"Wait for Me Mary-Anne" was written by Howard and Blaikley. The publisher was Southern Music Publishing Co.

== The Marmalade version ==
"Wait for Me Mary-Anne"

Single by The Marmalade
- B-side: "Mess Around"
- Released: 1968
- Label: CBS Records
- Composer: Howard Blaikley
- Producer: Mike Smith

The Marmalade singles chronology
"Lovin' Things" (1968)	"Wait for Me Mary-Anne" (1968)	"Ob-La-Di, Ob-La-Da" (1968)

=== Background ===
The Marmalade version had also been referred to as "Wait for Me Marianne".

=== Reception ===
Penny Valentine shared her thoughts on the song in the 21 September 1968 issue of Disc and Music Echo. It was to be released the following day. She said that even though everyone thought that the song would be a big hit, she didn't think that it had anything near the same impact as "Lovin' Things". She thought that the song ran into itself all the time and she would have liked a break between the verse and the chorus, so that the chorus would hit out a bit more.

Ian Middleton wrote in the 12 October 1968 issue of Record Mirror that with "Wait for Me Marianne", Marmalade had recorded a very fine follow up to "Lovin' Things". He also wrote that Marmalade was on a two-week break, and that he hoped they would find "Wait for Me Marianne" in the UK Top Ten when they returned.

The single was one of the Best Bets in the 26 October 1968 issue of Cash Box. The reviewer referred to it as a "good time bubble gum piece" that was a "cut above the bubblegum sound".

=== Charts ===
"Wait for Me Marianne" was in the Record Mirror Bubbling Under" chart for the weeks of October 5 and October 12.

The single peaked at no. 30 on the UK charts during its five-week run.

== The Dedikation version ==
"Wait for Me Mary-Anne"

Single by The Dedikation
- B-side: "Sally Had a Party"
- Released: September 1969
- Producer: Rob Robinson

New Zealand singles chronology
"Hayride" (1969)	"Wait for Me Mary-Anne" (1969)	"Ruby Tuesday" (1969)

=== Background ===
New Zealand group The Dedikation followed up on their single, "Hayride" / "Bare Footin'" with their version of "Wait for Me Mary-Anne" in 1969. The single was produced by Rob Robinson. The horns were arranged by Wellington jazz saxophonist Don Richardson. Backed with "Sally Had a Party", it was released on Polydor 45213.

=== Reception ===
According to Bruce Sergent of Sergent.com.au, the Dedikation version of "Wait for Me Mary-Anne" has more depth than the version by The Marmalade and is the superior version.

=== Charts ===
As shown in the 18 October 1969 issue of Billboard, "Wait for Me Mary-Anne" by The Dedikation debuted at no. 10 in the New Zealand chart. Their version made it to no. 2 on the New Zealand national charts. The single was kept off the no. 1 spot by "Something" by The Beatles. "Wait for Me Mary-Anne" also spent a total of three months in the NZ charts.
