= Rena Scott =

American singer

- Born: 1956 (age 69–70); Detroit, Michigan, U.S.
- Genres: R&B; disco; soul; funk; jazz
- Occupation: Recording artist
- Instrument: Vocals
- Years active: 1968–present
- Labels: Buddah Records; Sedona Records; Amor Records
- Website: http://www.renascott.net

Rena Scott (born 1956) is an American soul and R&B artist, from Detroit.

== Background ==
Rena Scott was recognized as a child for her singing ability in church. She performed her first talent show at the age of 13, and afterwards her first record "I Just Can't Forget That Boy", was released. She performed during that period as an opening act at local venues for many of the Motown acts like The Temptations, the Four Tops, and The Originals. The highlight of that period was singing back-up for Aretha Franklin at Carnegie Hall.

Her biggest hit came in 1978 with "Take Me I'm Yours", a duet with Michael Henderson. After touring with Henderson on the strength of this, Michael's record company Buddha Records signed her to a record deal and she recorded her first full-length album, Come on Inside, in 1979. The album's only single release – "Super Lover" peaked at #92 in July 1979 on the Billboard R&B Singles Charts. The album was produced by the R&B team Mtume and Reggie Lucas, former jazz musicians who had scored pop hits for Stephanie Mills, Roberta Flack, Donnie Hathaway, Phyllis Hyman and Lou Rawls.

Scott toured nightclubs in Detroit and later Los Angeles, and then to crowds of up to 50,000 people in R&B and Jazz festivals in the U.S. and Europe, such as the Montreux Jazz festival in Montreux, in Switzerland. She toured with The Crusaders, sharing the stage with George Benson and Natalie Cole. She came on board with founding Crusaders members Joe Sample, Wilton Felder and Stix Hooper after the departure of Randy Crawford, performing renditions of their 1979 pop hit "Street Life".

In later years, she charted in three categories on the Billboard charts with a song from the same set titled "Remember" for 18 weeks. It peaked at #9 in the Hot Pop Singles Sales; #5 in the Hot R&B/Hip-Hop Single Sales; and #80 in the top 100 R&B/Hip-Hop Songs. Another song from the set, "A Love Thang", reached #1 on the Hot R&B/Hip-Hop Single Sales chart and #17 on the Hot Pop Single Sales.

== Career ==
=== 1970s ===
Scott recorded the George McGregor composition, "I Just Can't Forget that Boy" which was released on Epic in 10776 in 1971. One of the Cash Box Choice Programming singles, it received a positive review with the reviewer writing that it was an explosive pop performance and extensive airplay could turn it into a giant record.

After Buddah Records folded, she left Detroit for Las Vegas, where she did shows at Caesars Palace and the Landmark Hotel before settling in Los Angeles to seek new recording opportunities. Before hooking up with The Crusaders, she had started writing songs with Producer and songwriter Skip Scarborough who wrote songs for LTD, Anita Baker and Earth, Wind & Fire.

=== 1980s to 1990s ===
In 1987, Scott re-emerged on Sedona Records with Love Zone, whose first single "Do That to Me One More Time" made the Billboard Hot Black Singles chart.

Her single, "(No Parking in My) Love Zone" was a hit. It made it to no. 93 on the Billboard chart.

Scott recorded the song "This Love's for You", which was composed by Gary St. Clair and produced by Tim O'Brien. The single was released on the Sedona Recording Company label in 1989. It was also on her Love Zone album. By 23 June, Radio & Records had recorded that it had been added to ten playlists. The following week it was added to another seven. And by 19 August, as shown in Billboard, the single was added to the playlist of fifty-three radio stations from WXYV to KDIA.

It made the Billboard Hot Black Singles chart, debuting at no. 88 for the week of 5 August 1989. It was in the chart for three weeks, and peaked at no. 80 for the week of 12 August.

=== 2000s to present ===
For the week of 12 August 2006, Scott's single "Remember" entered the Billboard Hot R&B/Hip Hop Singles Sales chart at no. 23. It had already been in the outer regions of the chart for sixteen weeks. The next week, the single had fallen back to no. 25.This was the last week of chart presence for the single.

Scott's latest "Can't Wait" was released on her own record label, Amor Records. Songs from Rena's CD/DVD Let Me Love You were featured in the film Love and Action in Chicago, which was shown on the HBO, Showtime, Cinemax, Starz and BET cable television networks. It starred Regina King, Courtney Vance, Kathleen Turner, and Ed Asner.

== Discography ==
=== Singles ===
Singles America Argentina or otherwise where indicated
Act	Release	Catalogue	Year	Notes
Little Rena Scott	"I Just Can't Forget That Boy" / "Set Me Free"	Grand Junction 1002	1971	
Rena Scott	"I Finally Found the Love" / "Testify"	Epic 5-10864	1972	
Rena Scott	"La-Te-Da (This Girl's in Love)" / "It's Time to Go Now"	Epic 5-11064	1973	
Rena Scott	"Super Lover" / "The Grass Ain't Greener"	Buddah Records DSC 133	1979	
Rena Scott	"We Can Make It Better" / "Come on Inside"	Buddah Records BDA 614	1979	
Rena Scott	"Hold Up" / "Liza's Road (Instrumental)"	Polydor 883 760-7	1986	Germany release
Rena Scott	" Do That to Me One More Time" / "Can't Wait till Tomorrow"	Sedona Recording Company SDS-7503	1987	
Rena Scott	"(No Parking in My) Love Zone" (7" Radio Jam), "(No Parking in My) Love Zone" (Boom Boom Jam), "(No Parking in My) Love Zone" (Bonus Beats-Beats) / "(No Parking in My) Love Zone" (Extended Jam), "(No Parking in My) Love Zone" (Instrumental Jam)	Sedona Recording Company SDO-7511	1988	12", 33 ⅓ RPM
Rena Scott	"This Love's for You" (7" Radio Edit) / "This Love's for You" (LP Version)	Sedona Recording Company SDS-7512	1989	
Rena Scott	"I Could Use a Kiss" (Radio Edit), "I Could Use a Kiss" (LP Version) / "Don't Know What You Got", "I Could Use A Kiss" (Instrumental)	Sedona Recording Company SDO-7610	1989	12", 33 ⅓ RPM
Rena Scott	"I Know It's Right	Amor Records	2004 ?	
Rena Scott	"A Love Thang", "A Love Thang" (Instrumental) / "A Day and Night" (Bonus Track), "A Day and Night" (Instrumental) (Bonus Track)	Amor Records AMR 0711	2005	CD single
Rena Scott	"Remember"; Remember (Video)	Amor Records AMR0421	2005	CD, Maxi-Single; DVD, DVD-Video
Rena Scott	"Driftin' On a Dream" / "Kick It"	Izipho Soul ZP54	2020	UK release
Rena Scott	"You're So Far Away" / "You're So Far Away" (The Nigel Lowis Mix)	Izipho Soul ZP67	2021	UK release

=== Studio albums ===
Album
Act	Release	Catalogue	Year	Notes
Rena Scott	Come On Inside	Buddah Records BDS 5721	1979	
Rena Scott	Love Zone	Sedona Recording Company SDI 7511	1989	
Rena Scott	Let Me Love You	Amor Records AMR0002	2004	
Rena Scott	Take Me Away	Amor Records	2010	
