= Ray Ahipene-Mercer =

New Zealand politician

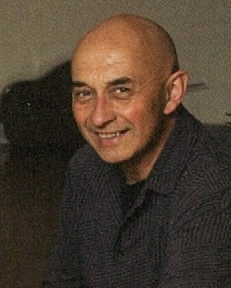
- Ahipene-Mercer in 2005

Wellington City Councillor for the Eastern Ward
- In office 2000–2016
- Preceded by: Sue Kedgley
- Succeeded by: Chris Calvi-Freeman

Personal details
- Born: 20 October 1948 (age 77) Wellington, New Zealand
- Spouse: Christine (Chris) Viggars (deceased)
- Education: Upper Hutt College
- Occupation: Musician, guitar-maker, environmentalist, politician

Raymond Ahipene-Mercer (born 20 October 1948) is a former New Zealand politician, who served as a Wellington City Councillor for the Eastern Ward, only the second Māori to be elected to the Wellington City Council and the first Māori to be elected since 1962. He is also a guitar-maker, musician, and environmentalist, and was one of the leaders of the Clean Water Campaign, which led to the end of sewage pollution of the Wellington coast. He was a candidate for mayor of Wellington in the council elections of 2007, the first Māori ever to contest the position. He was runner-up to the incumbent. As a musician and guitar maker he usually uses the name Ray Mercer, and has used the name Ray Ahipene-Mercer for other purposes including his environmental work and politics.

== Family background ==
Ahipene-Mercer is of Māori, Welsh, Swedish, and Scots descent. He descends from the ancient Wellington tribes of Ngāi Tara and Ngāti Ira. Direct ancestors were members of the Ngāti Ira people displaced after conflict in the Wellington area in the 1820s to the Wairarapa. Ahipene Mercer's closest Māori links now are at Pirinoa, and Kohunui Marae, the people of his maternal grandmother. His mother's father, from whom the name "Ahipene" was passed down, was of the Ngāti Kahungunu, tribe from the area around Pōrangahau, and also of Ngāi Tahu descent. This grandfather was also of Scots descent, through James Wybrow, a whaler. There is a strong family link with Ruapuke Island, between Stewart Island and the South Island.

Ahipene Mercer's mother, Ramona Ahipene, married Eugene (Gene) Mercer, a seaman of mixed Welsh and Swedish ancestry who arrived in New Zealand after World War II. Both parents were both active members of the celebrated Ngāti Pōneke Māori club in Wellington City, and later the famous Hutt Valley Māwai Hakona group. The whole family was closely associated with the urban Orongomai Marae. Eugene Mercer was a staunch trade unionist.

Ahipene-Mercer married Christine (Chris) Viggars in 1972. After an extended overseas experience in the UK they returned to New Zealand, where Chris died, suddenly, in 1981.

== Early life and education ==
Ahipene-Mercer was raised in Petone and Upper Hutt, and attended Trentham School and Upper Hutt College, where despite congenital problems with one arm and leg he captained the rugby first XV.

== Musician ==
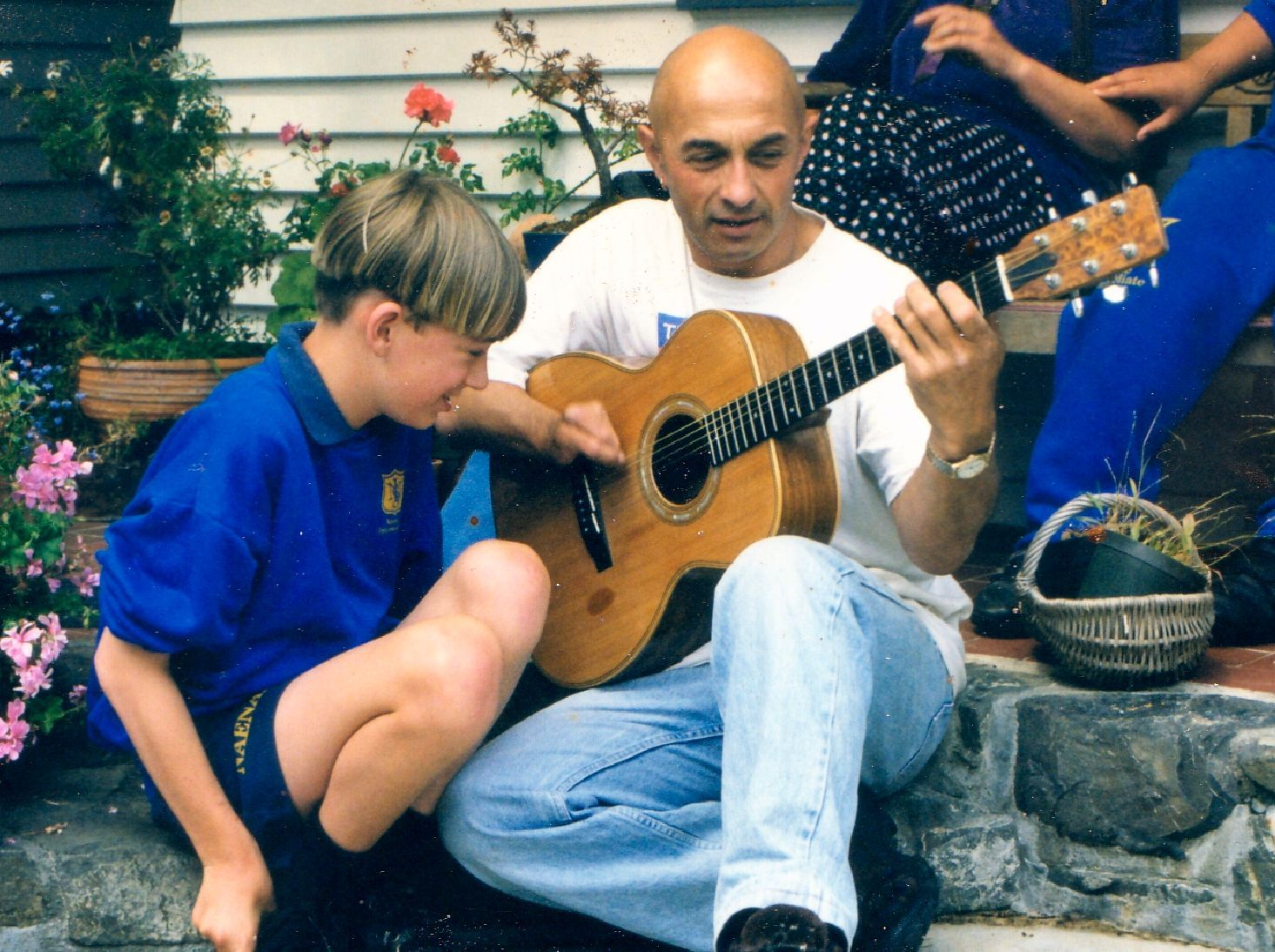
Ahipene-Mercer at his home.

Ahipene-Mercer's father was a guitar player and his mother a singer. He began his music career playing in school bands in the early 1960s. In 1964 the Beatles came to Wellington and the young Ahipene-Mercer attended their concert, resolving then to immerse himself in music. He joined the music programming section of the New Zealand Broadcasting Corporation in 1967, resigning in 1969 to become a full-time musician at the age of 21. As Ray Mercer he played lead guitar with The Dedikation, which successfully recorded three singles and an album. They were number two on the New Zealand Hit Parade in 1969 with their first single, "Wait for me Maryanne", a cover of a 1968 song by Marmalade, and reached number 12 on the national charts with their 1970 cover of the Rolling Stones' "Ruby Tuesday." Dedikation appeared on the famous "C'mon" TV series, and were finalists in the Loxene Golden Disc awards.

Between 1972 and 1980 Ahipene-Mercer worked in London, UK, playing in pub bands, and returned to New Zealand to tour with the Rocky Horror Show in 1978. By that time, he had begun training in making guitars, with the aim of becoming a full-time Luthier. He returned to Wellington in 1980 as a Luthier, but has continued to play guitar both for pleasure and semi-professionally. He organised and performed in "Rock against Racism" concerts in Wellington in the early 1980s and worked with other bands such as the Wayne Mason band and Blue Highways. He had composed and recorded music for children's stories and some films, and took part in concerts for causes such as medical aid for Iraqi children, child cancer and the Mary Potter Hospice. He claims to have played in every hall in Wellington. Ahipene-Mercer is an external assessor of live music performance at Whitirea Polytech, as a member of the music advisory board. He is a member of the Board of Studies at Te Toi Whakaari New Zealand Drama School.

He has the unusual status as the only City Councillor ever to perform in the Wellington International Festival of the Arts as part of the "Maori All Stars" in 2006.

== Community activist, environmentalist ==
Described as a "tireless environmental campaigner" by former Mayor Mark Blumsky, Ahipene-Mercer, with John Blincoe, led the Wellington Clean Water Campaign, which successfully sought to have Wellington to treat its sewage, and stop dumping it, raw, in the sea.

He is well known for his work to protect and rescue little blue penguins or Kororā, and arranged the construction of the first artificial nesting areas for the birds in Wellington. Poachers of pāua, or New Zealand abalone, have been a particular target of Ahipene-Mercer's attention, and as an honorary fisheries ranger he has seized and returned many thousands of illegal pāua to the sea. He regularly speaks to groups, especially schools, about environmental issues, and includes a strong Māori perspective in these talks. He is an advocate of reforestation in Wellington City and has been an active organiser of community tree-planting events since 1990. He has sought to reintroduce a number of Māori names to Wellington, such as Te Tangihanga-a-Kupe, for the rocks known also as Barrett Reef, and Tarakena Bay, and in 1996–1997 assisted Karori Wildlife Sanctuary in creating an audio tape of Māori names of flora and fauna for use by sanctuary volunteers and members. Ahipene-Mercer was awarded the New Zealand 1990 Commemoration Medal, and he received a major conservation award in 1998.

== Politician ==
Ahipene-Mercer's work on environmental issues often brought him into regular contact with the Wellington City Council. He was elected to the Wellington City Council in a by-election in 2000, taking the Eastern Ward position previously held by Sue Kedgley, who was elected to parliament as a Green MP. He was elected again in 2001 and 2004. Mana News Service reported that in 2001 he was one of only 20 Māori, out of a total of over a thousand New Zealanders, to win office in local elections that October. He is only the second Māori to be elected to the Wellington City Council and the first Māori to be elected since 1962.

He is Cultural and Arts Portfolio Leader on the Wellington City Council, a member of the Council Controlled Organisations, Strategy and Policy and Grants Committee. He is a director of Wellington Waterfront Ltd, has been a member of the Wellington Conversation Board, and a trustee of the Joe Aspill Trust.

Initially regarded as part of the "left" group on Council, Ahipene-Mercer has avoided alignment with any faction, preferring to work across all groups. He has fielded some criticism from supporters for his willingness to work cooperatively with right-wing Mayor Kerry Prendergast, but announced in early 2007 his intention to oppose Prendergast in the elections to be held later that year. He told reporters he was "in to win", and if elected would continue to work with all councillors.He was runner-up in the election.

Ahipene-Mercer attributed his 2001 council win to votes from Pākehā (non-Māori) as well as Māori voters who recognised that he worked for everyone, not just for Māori interests. He does not believe in designated Māori seats on either the national and local level, and hence emphasises the importance of Treaty education so that Pākehā are well-informed about and responsive to Māori issues. He announced in November 2015 that he would not contest the 2016 elections, retiring back to his work as a luthier.

In June 2018 he was elected Chair of the Board of Orchestra Wellington, succeeding the previous chair and continuing his involvement in arts governance.

Political offices
Preceded by Sue Kedgley	Wellington City Councillor for Eastern Ward; 2000–2016	Succeeded by Chris Calvi-Freeman
