= Shadows of Knight (album) =

Studio album by The Shadows of Knight
- Released: 1969
- Recorded: 1968–1969
- Genres: Garage rock; hard rock
- Length: 34:58
- Label: Super K Productions
- Producers: Jerry Kasenetz; Jeffry Katz; Joey Levine; Arthur Resnick

The Shadows of Knight chronology
Back Door Men (1967)	Shadows of Knight (1969)	Raw 'n Alive at the Cellar, Chicago 1966! (1992)

Singles from Shadows of Knight
- 1. "Shake" Released: September 1968

Professional ratings
Review scores
Source	Rating
AllMusic	3/5 stars

Shadows of Knight is the third studio album by American garage rock band The Shadows of Knight, and was released on Super K Productions, SKS 6002, in 1969. Recording for the album came after lead vocalist Jim Sohns revamped the Shadows of Knight's line-up and signed with Super K. Although Shadows of Knight did not chart and was the last album featuring new material by the group until A Knight to Remember, a single taken from the effort, "Shake", became a moderate national success in the United States.

== Background ==
Throughout 1966 and 1967, the Shadows of Knight were forerunners of the Chicago garage rock scene, and gained prominence with a string of national hits on the Billboard Hot 100, including "Gloria", "Oh Yeah", and "Bad Little Woman". However, by the end of 1967 the classic "Gloria" line-up began to disband when Jerry McGeorge left to join the psychedelic rock group H. P. Lovecraft, Joe Kelley formed his own blues band, and Hawk Wolinski later helped establish Bangor Flying Circus. Lead vocalist Jim Sohns, having authority over the Shadows of Knight's name, dismissed the remaining band members, and formed a new line-up with Woody Woodruff (lead guitar), John Fisher (bass guitar), and Ken Turkin (drums).

In 1968, the band signed a recording contract with Super K Productions, a subsidiary of Buddah Records responsible for hits with primarily bubblegum pop bands like 1910 Fruitgum Company and the Ohio Express. Tension soon arouse between the Shadows of Knight and the Jerry Kasenetz-Jeffry Katz production team over musical direction. The group, in favor of their characteristic bluesy garage rock approach, conflicted with Kasenetz-Katz's polished production techniques, ultimately resulting in the duo instructing co-directors Joey Levine and Arthur Resnick to overdub much of the instrumentals with the work of uncredited session musicians.

Shadows of Knight was released in 1969 on Super K Productions, but failed to chart nationally. Prior to the album's distribution, the single, "Shake", was released and managed to obtain moderate success, peaking at number 46 on the Billboard Hot 100. A re-recorded version of the song appears on the album, titled "Shake Revisited '69". Other notable tracks included a cover of the Buffalo Springfield song "Bluebird", Willie Dixon's "Back Door Man" and "Times and Places" by West Coast Pop Art Experimental Band's bassist Shaun Harris. The album was the final release containing new material by the Shadows of Knight until A Knight to Remember, in 2007. Since its initial release, Shadows of Knight has been reissued in 1994, 2009, and 2013.

== Track listing ==
1. "Follow" (Joey Levine) – 2:17
2. "Alone" (Levine, Steve Feldman) – 2:06
3. "Times and Places" (Shaun Harris) – 2:40
4. "I Am What I Am" (Dan Baughman (credited as B. Baughman), Jim Sohns) – 2:48
5. "Uncle Wiggley's Airship" (Baughman, Sohns) – 3:56
6. "I Wanna Make You All Mine" (Sohns, Woody Woodruff) – 2:40
7. "Shake Revisited '69" (Levine, Kris Resnick) – 3:28
8. "I'll Set You Free" (Sohns, John Fisher) – 4:55
9. "Under Acoustic Control" (Sohns, Fisher, Ken Turkin, Woodruff) – 0:28
10. "Bluebird" (Stephen Stills) – 5:40
11. "Back Door Man" (Willie Dixon) – 4:00

=== Bonus tracks on CD reissue, 1994 ===
12. "From Way Out to Way Under" – 2:55
13. "My Fire Department Needs a Fireman" (Kasenetz, Katz) – 2:24
14. "Shake" (45 Version) (Levine, Resnick) – 2:30
15. "Run Run Billy Porter" (J. J. Woods, Ritchie Cordell) – 2:16

== Personnel ==
Shadows of Knight

- James Alan Sohns – lead vocals
- Woody Woodruff – lead guitar
- John Fisher – bass guitar
- Ken Turkin – drums
- unnamed session musicians – orchestral arrangements

Technical

- Joey Levine – producer
- Arthur Resnick - producer
- Joel Brodsky – photography

== Chart performance ==
=== Single ===
Year	Single	Chart	Position
1968	"Shake"	Billboard Hot 100	46
1968	"Shake"	RPM Charts; Canada	37
