= Black Olives =

Song by the Bad Boys
- A-side: "Love"
- B-side: "Black Olives"
- Published: 1966
- Label: Paula Records 254
- Songwriters: G. St. Clair, Danny Conway, Demetri Callas
- Producers: Ray Allen and Charlie Daniels

"Black Olives" was a 1966 song for the Bad Boys. It was the B side of the group's single "Love". It became a hit for the group that year.

== Background ==
The Bad Boys were a musical ensemble that was made up of Gary St. Clair, Al Ruzicka, Danny Conway and Demetri Callas.

"Black Olives" was composed by Gary St. Clair, Danny Conway and Demetri Callas. It was registered in 1966. "Black Olives" was the B side of "Love" which was released on Paula 254 in 1966.

The musicians who took part in the recording sessions were, Gary St. Clair on organ, Charlie Daniels on bass, Danny Conway on drums, and Demetri Callas on guitar. It appears that Al Ruzicka had no involvement in the session. The production was handled by Charlie Daniels and Ray Allen. Daniels also handled the arrangements.

An ad appeared in the 3 December 1966 issue of Cash Box for Jewel / Paula Records. The three singles listed as the Other Hot Singles were, "Things You Do" by Frank Frost, "The Push" by Billy Joe Young, and "Black Olive" by the Bad Boys.

== Reception ==
For the week of 10 December 1966, Record World listed the record as one of the "Sleepers of the Week". The magazine referred to it as an organ-paced instrumental that gets down to the nitty gritty and that it should make an impact in the charts.

A Cash Box Best Bet, the record was reviewed in the magazine's 17 December issue, with "Black Olives" as the A side. The reviewer referred to it as a "funky frenetic rock outing" and it was likely to do well for the group. The reviewer gave the flip side "Love" a B+ rating and said that it was a strong rock effort.

According to R&B Beat in the 21 January 1967 issue of Record World, and incorrectly referring to the group as Bad Guys, Stan Lewis had the "hottest breaking instrumental in the business with "Black Olives".

== Airplay ==
According to the 17 December issue of Record World, Donny Brooks the night deejay at WDAS Philadelphia was high on the instrumental "Black Olives". It was reported in the R & B Beat section of Record World for the week of 7 January 1967 that Donny Brooks said that Black Olives by Bad Guys on Jewel was "Bad". Brooks broke through the song in Miami and Pittsburgh.

For the week of 21 January, 1967, the Record World Primary Exposure chart showed that the single was an extra without a numerical rank at WEAM in Washington D.C.. The following week, the Record World Primary Exposure chart had the single as an extra without a numerical rank at WWRL in New York. Also that week, it was reported in the R & B Beat section of Record World that "Black Olives" was big for an instrumental around the nation, but biggest at WAMO where it was at #4.

== Charts ==
The single debuted at no. 48 in the Cash Box Top 50 In R&B Locations chart for the week of 17 December. It peaked at no 35. in the Top 50 In R&B Locations chart for the week of 24 December 1966.

In 1967, it peaked again in the Top 50 In R&B Locations chart at no. 35 for the week of 7 January.

The single made its debut at no. 35 in the Cash Box Looking Ahead chart for the week of 28 January. The single peaked at no. 11 for the week of 25 February. It was still in the Looking Ahead chart for the week of 18 March.

The single debuted at no. 46 in the Record World Top 50 R&B chart for the week of 24 December 1966. The single was at no. 32 for the week of 21 January.

== After the hit ==
The group were eventually noticed by Columbia Records and at some stage, they changed their name to Flavor.
