= Luv'd Ones =

American rock band

The Luv'd Ones
- Origin: Niles, Michigan, United States
- Genres: Rock, pop, garage rock
- Years active: 1965–1968
- Label: Dunwich Records
- Past members: Char Vinnedge; Chris Vinnedge; Mary Gallagher; Faith Orem

The Luv'd Ones were an American, all-female rock group of the 1960s.

Char Vinnedge's career as lead guitarist / singer began in the early 1960s with her all-girl group The Tremolons, in which she initially played all instrumentals and recorded a single on Wildwood Records (Benton Harbor, Michigan) for Komotion Music that contained: "Please Let Me Know" (w/vocals) and "Theme For A DJ" (instrumental). About a year later, they signed a record deal with Dunwich Records, changed their name to The Luv'd Ones, and released several more singles over a five-year period, mostly written by Char Vinnedge. The band broke up in 1969.

After Luv'd Ones, Vinnedge founded the group Syrup. In 1971, she recorded an album, Nitro Function, with Billy Cox, the former bass player for Jimi Hendrix. The group was signed to Pye Records in 1971.

In the late 1990s the Luv'd Ones signed a five-year deal with Sundazed Records. In 1999 they released all of the Luv'd Ones' Dunwich Records singles and a large collection of their demos on the album Truth Gotta Stand, and at the same time released a four-song EP of the Tremolons music. The project was started in 1997, but Vinnedge died of a heart attack in December of that same year. In 2005, after the deal with Sundazed Records, Rhino Records signed the Luv'd Ones for the single "Up Down Sue", and released it on a four CD box set compilation album, One Kiss Can Lead To Another: Girl Group Sounds, Lost and Found.

== Members ==
- Char Vinnedge (born Charlotte Alyce Vinnedge, March 1, 1943, Niles, Michigan - died December 5, 1997, Dowagiac, Michigan) - vocals, lead guitar
- Chris Vinnedge (born Christine M. Vinnedge, May 25, 1950, Niles, Michigan - died January 16, 2004, Dowagiac, Michigan) - bass guitar
- Mary Gallagher - rhythm guitar
- Faith Orem (born January 25, 1945, Niles, Michigan) - drums
