= Jewel Records (Shreveport record label) =

American independent record label

- Founded: 1963
- Founder: Stan Lewis
- Defunct: 1999
- Status: Defunct
- Genre: Blues, Pop, Country, R&B, Gospel
- Country of origin: U.S.A.
- Location: Shreveport, Louisiana

Jewel Records was an American independent record label, founded in 1963 by Stan Lewis (July 5, 1927 – July 15, 2018) and based in Shreveport, Louisiana.

It had two subsidiary labels, Paula (established in 1965 and named after Lewis's wife Pauline) and Ronn (established in 1967).

== Overview ==
The first of many retail record stores, called Stan's Record Shop, was opened in 1948 in Shreveport. The store expanded, and Lewis built connections with record label owners who were dropping by at his store. By mid 1950s, Lewis began to record artists.

Leonard Chess of Chess Records was a friend of Lewis's, and it was him who persuaded Lewis to start his own record label. In the early days of label, its LPs were manufactured by Chess Records.

Lewis started the label in 1963, and named it Jewel after seeing a flourishing supermarket in Chicago named Jewel Tea Company.

Later, Stan Lewis purchased and reissued the catalogues of Cobra Records, Chief Records, USA Records and JOB Records.

At one time, Jewel (along with Ronn and Paula) was a division of Shreveport-based Sue Records (unrelated to the New York–based Sue Records).

In 1999, Lewis sold the rights for master recordings of Jewel and its subsidiary labels to EMusic.com. Fuel 2000 subsequently purchased the rights, and owned and managed the Jewel/Paula/Ronn catalogues. The private IP holding company, 43 North Broadway, LLC., purchased the Jewel/Paula/Ronn catalogues through its acquisition of Fuel 2000 in 2015.

Currently, 43 North Broadway, LLC and P-VINE hold the rights to Jewel Records.

== Artists ==
The artists who recorded for and/or released records from Jewel (or Paula, Ronn) include Billy Joe Young with " I've Got You on My Mind Again" on Paula 240. An ad by Paula Records in the 23 July 1966 issue of Record World had it as one of the hot new ones to watch. Also that week, his single was a Top Play record at WWIN. A single by Billy Joe and His Confidentials, "Got You on My Mind" bw "Feeling Blue" was released on B-J 45-64 at some stage in 1965. It has been speculated that Billy Joe Ash is the same singer as Billy Joe Young who recorded for the Paula and Jewel record labels.

The Bad Boys had their song "Black Olives", released on Paula 254. It made the Record World national R&B chart, peaking at no. 28 on 28 January 1967.

Others artists were, Buster Benton, Frank Frost, Lowell Fulson, John Lee Hooker, Lightnin' Hopkins, John Fred and his Playboy Band, Toussaint McCall, The Uniques, Jerry McCain, Memphis Slim, Little Johnny Taylor, and Justin Wilson.
