= Nu Flavor =

American R&B quartet

- Origin: Long Beach, California
- Instrument: R&B
- Years active: 1994–2000
- Label: Reprise
- Members: Jacob Ceniceros; Anthony DaCosta; Rico Luna; Frank Pangelinan, Jr.

Nu Flavor is an R&B quartet from Long Beach, California consisting of Jacob Ceniceros (baritone/), Anthony DaCosta (tenor), Rico Luna (countertenor), and Frank Pangelinan, Jr. (tenor/lead).

== History ==
Nu Flavor formed in 1994. Under their manager's direction, they created a cover of the Journey hit "Open Arms", and eventually the recording found its way to Reprise Records president Howie Klein. After singing a cappella in his office, he signed the group on the spot. Shortly thereafter, Los Angeles KIBB radio night guy, Rick Hummer, was given the group's "Open Arms" demo and began spinning it during his dedication show. The group started calling into KIBB's "Afterhours with Chaka Khan and Rick Hummer" and sang for them, who immediately invited the group into the station for their first on-air performance and interview. This gave them a solid launching pad and fan base in Los Angeles.

The group's first album, Nu Flavor, debuted in 1997, launching two singles: "Heaven", their biggest hit, peaked at No. 27 on the Billboard Hot 100 and "Sweet Sexy Thing", at No. 62. Their second album It's On! appeared two years later, which yielded the hit singles "Sprung", "3 Little Words" and "Most Beautiful Girl". The single "Baby Be There" from Nu Flavor was released in 1999 and peaked at No. 83 on the Hot 100.

The group has toured and performed numerous shows in places such as Amarillo and Amigoland Mall, Texas, and also held a free concert at Ypao Beach, Guam.

Pangelinan, a former native of Guam, said he had always wanted to go back home; he finally did in October 2001. His father, Frank Pangelinan, Sr., is also a well known recording artist in Guam.

In January 2000, Nu Flavor appeared in the 14th episode of season 10 of the teen drama Beverly Hills, 90210, "I'm Using You 'Cause I Like You".

== Discography ==
=== Albums ===
- 1997: Nu Flavor
- 1999: It's On!

=== Compilation ===
- 2019: Sweet Sexy Thing - The Greatest Hits

=== Singles ===
- 1997: "Heaven" - U.S. #27, Rhythmic #6, Pop #22, Radio #32, R&B #58
- 1997: "Sweet Sexy Thing" - U.S. #62, Rhythmic #8, R&B #93
- 1997: "Havin' a Party"
- 1999: "Sprung"
- 1999: "3 Little Words" - U.S. #89, Rhythmic #14
- 1999: "Most Beautiful Girl"
- 1999: "Baby Be There" - U.S. #83, Rhythmic #38
