= (No Parking in My) Love Zone =

Single by Rena Scott

from the album Love Zone
- A-side: (No Parking In My) Love Zone (7" Radio Jam), (No Parking In My) Love Zone (Boom Boom Jam)
- B-side: "(No Parking In My) Love Zone (Extended Jam), (No Parking In My) Love Zone (Instrumental Jam)"
- Released: 1988
- Length: 4:50; 5:26
- Label: Sedona Recording Company SDO-7511
- Composer: G. St. Clair
- Producer: Tim O'Brien

"(No Parking in My) Love Zone" was a 1988 single for Rena Scott. It was a hit for her on the Billboard Hot Black Singles chart that year.

== Background ==
"(No Parking in My) Love Zone" was written by Gary St. Clair and appears on her Love Zone album.

== Reception ==
In the Artists Breaking Through-Fall '88, New Music Programming Guide by Radio & Records, the song was referred to as one of the seductive delivered strong rhythmic tracks of the album.

== Charts ==
The single debuted at no. 100 in the Billboard Hot Black Singles chart for the week of 26 November 1988. At week three in the chart, for the week of 10 December, the single reached its peak position of 93.
