= Sally Had a Party =

- Dutch release banner shell

Song by Flavor
- A-side: "Sally Had a Party"
- B-side: "Shop Around"
- Released: 1968
- Length: 2:22
- Label: Columbia 4-44521
- Composer(s): G. St. Clair - T. M. O'Brien
- Producer(s): Tim O'Brien

Flavor singles chronology
"Sally Had a Party" (1968)	"Heart-Teaser" (1968)

"Sally Had a Party" was a 1968 single for the group Flavor. It became a hit for them that year, staying on the charts for over two months.

== Background ==
"Sally Had a Party" was written by Gary St Clair and Tim O’Brien. The B side of the single was "Shop Around".

The group Flavor was a rock trio from Frederick, Maryland. It was made up of Gary St. Clair on vocals and bass, Demetri Callas on guitar and Danny Conway on drums.

It was reported in the 10 August 1968 issue of Record World that Tim O'Brien who was producing a Chambers Brothers album had written, arranged and produced the single for new rock group Flavor who were now already in the charts. This was O'Brien's first single that he had written, arranged and produced for Columbia. "Sally Had a Party" was one of the new CBS singles released in Holland that week.

== Reception ==
It was noted by Kal Rudman's Money Music in the 25 May issue of Record World that "Sally Had a Party" was Eric Stevens' personal sleeper.

It was noted in the Cash Box One Stoppin' section for the week of 8 June that Nebraska operators were favoring "Sally Had a Party" by the Flavor.

Along with "Naturally Stoned" by the Avante Garde, "Storybook Children" by Billy Joe Royal, "Time Has Come Today" by the Chambers Brothers, and "Little Green Apples" by O. C. Smith, it was one of five Columbia singles noted as potentially big. In Canada, Columbia man Charlie Camilerri was at work promoting the O. C. Smith and Flavor singles which were moving up the charts.

== Airplay ==
As shown in Kal Rudman's Money Music for the 1 June issue of Record World, "Sally Had a Party" was at no. 2 on WIXY, and a pick at both WMEX and KRIZ.

For the week of 15 June, as shown in Cash Box, "Sally Had a Party" was being added to 8% of radio stations program schedules that week.

As shown in the 17 August issue of Cash Box, "Sally Had a Party" was added to the program schedule of 12% of radio stations that week, with a total to date of 21%. According to the 24 August issue of Cash Box, "Sally Had a Party" was being added to between 5% and 10% of radio stations program schedules that week. It date it was at 29%.

== Charts ==
=== Cash Box ===
For the week of 15 June, "Sally Had a Party" made its debut at no. 39 in the Cash Box Looking Ahead chart. For the week of 6 July, "Sally Had a Party" debuted at no. 94 in the Cash Box Top 100 Singles chart.

"Sally Had a Party" was at no. 27 in the Cash Box Looking Ahead chart for the week of 20 July. For the week of 27 July, "Sally Had a Party" made its second debut at no. 91 in the Cash Box Top 100 Singles Chart. There was an error with the previous week's position given as 94 because "You Can Cry If You Want To" by the Troggs was at that position. The single reached its peak position of no. 66 on the Cash Box Top 100 for the week of 24 August. It was still in the chart for the week of 7 September.

=== Record World ===
"Sally Had a Party" debuted at no. 23 in the Record World Singles Coming Up chart for the week of 1 June 1968.

For the week of 10 August 1968, "Sally Had a Party" debuted at no. 97 in the Record World 100 Top Pops chart. With the single at no. 91 and at week two in the 100 Top Pops chart, there was the same title credited to the Lettermen at no. 35 in the Record World Singles Coming Up chart. At week four, the single peaked at no. 81 for the week of 31 August.

=== Billboard ===
Spending a total of five weeks in the Billboard chart, the single peaked at no. 95 on 3 August 1968.

=== RPM Weekly (Canada) ===
The single charted in Canada, debuting in the RPM Weekly RPM 100 chart for the week of 7 July. The single peaked at no. 72 for the week of 26 August, its final charting week.
