= Tim O'Brien (music producer) =

- Born: Timothy Michael O'Brien
- Origin: United States
- Occupations: Music producer, music industry executive
- Years active: 1960s - 1990s
- Formerly of: Stowaways, Timmy O'Brien And The "Premiers"

Tim O'Brien is a musician, record producer, arranger and music industry executive who was active from the 1960s to the 1990s. Artists he has worked with include The Chambers Brothers, Flavor, Ritchie Luvworth, John Davidson, Gary St. Clair, Sweet Henry, Barry Williams, Little Anthony, Taka Boom, All-4-One, Rena Scott, and The Def Dames.

== Background ==
O'Brien studied at the American University in Washington DC where he majored in music composition and theory.

In 1968, he joined Columbia Records where he worked as a producer in both New York and Los Angeles. He was later based on the West Coast, where he worked for the Paramount and Dot record labels as both a manager of independent production and record producer.

Both O'Brien and Gary St. Clair played a major part in the formation of the 1990s group All-4-One. O'Brien was the one who gave the group their name.

O'Brien was connected with the Brookhill Record Corp. and was the founder of the Sedona Recording Company.

== Career ==
=== 1960s ===
Working with Richie Luvworth, O'Brien arranged the A side of the single, "Hey Baby - Where You Gonna Go" bw "Girl Of Mine" which was released on the Date label in April 1968. According to the 27 April 1968 issue of Billboard, it was a happening single at Radio WLLL in Lynchburg.

It was reported in the 10 August 1968 issue of Record World that Columbia Records vice-president Jack Gold had made an announcement that Tim O'Brien had been appointed to the positions of A&R for popular artists and record producer. O'Brien had put forward his first production for the label, a song that he also co-wrote for the group Flavor. With the song already in the charts, it was also reported that he had finished work on a Chambers Brothers album and signed up a group from the Broadway musical Hair. The Flavor single, "Sally Had a Party" became a hit, making it to no. 66 on the Cash Box Top 100, no. 81 on the Record World 100 Top Pops chart, and 95 on the Billboard chart.

His production work on the Chambers Brothers' A New Time – A New Day album produced the songs, "I Can't Turn You Loose", "Guess Who", Do Your Thing", "Where Have All the Flowers Gone?", "Love is All I Have", "You Got The Power To Turn Me On", "I Wish It Would Rain", "Rock Me Mama", "No, No, No, Don't Say Goodbye", "Satisfy You", and "A New Time, A New Day". It would pay off. Debuting at no. 194 in the Billboard Top LP's chart, it spent 21 weeks in the chart, peaking at no. 16. It also made it to no. 13 on the Record World 100 Top LPs chart, and no. 20 on the Cash Box Top 100 Albums chart for 30 November 1968. The single from the album, "I Can't Turn You Loose" reached no. 37 on the Billboard Hot 100 singles chart, and in Canada, it reached no. 29 on the RPM 100 chart.

He produced John Davidson's self-titled album that was released in 1969. The album which included the songs, "Stormy", "Little Green Apples", "Didn't We?" and "Both Sides, Now" had a positive reception in the UK.

=== 1970s ===
He produced the song "Cecilia" for Sweet Henry. It was a hit in Canada on the RPM 100 chart. Debuting on 16 May 1970. It peaked at no. 46 for the week of 20 June.

It was reported in the 3 October 1970 issue of Record World that O'Brien and fellow producer Tom Mack had been working out of the new Los Angeles office of Paramount under Ed Matthews for the last sixteen weeks. O'Brien had produced recordings for three television shows. He had produced a theme song single for The Young Lawyers, a contemporary version of the Mission Impossible theme by Grand Canyon, and a theme for the Brady Bunch television show, as well as a related single. O'Brien had also recorded an album, Christmas with the Brady Bunch which was cited for release in October that year. The article also mentioned that Barry Williams had been signed to Paramount and a record was expected in the near future. O'Brien would later recall the issue of being burdened with "six little kids who could not sing". However, a solution was achieved when the situation was improved with voice lessons etc. During the course of the Los Angeles office's thirteen-week operation, O'Brien had also produced new recordings for Mitch Ryder who was fronting his group, Detroit. They had also taken on board, new acts, Gary St. Clair, Lee Greenwood and T. C. Atlantic. They had also purchased two masters that were doing well. They were "Knock, Knock" by Andra Willis and "Poquito Soul" by One G Plus Three.

O'Brien produced Gary St. Clair's self-titled album that was released on the Paramount label in 1972. The album which had Clydie King and Venetta Fields as backing vocalists also had four songs that were written by St. Clair and O'Brien. It received a positive review in the 19 February issue of Billboard with LP chart potential being noted.

=== 1980s ===
O'Brien produced the Go Nutz album for Herman Brood & His Wild Romance. It was a Recommended LP in the 14 June 1980 issue of Billboard, where it received a positive review.

He produced the Little Anthony single, "This Time We're Winning" which was released in 1983. It was a recommended single on the Billboard Top Single Picks page for the week of 4 April.

O'Brien worked with Sedona Recording Company artist, Rena Scott. He produced her 1988 Love Zone album, which produced three hit singles, "Do That to Me One More Time", "(No Parking in My) Love Zone", and "This Love's for You".

=== 1990s ===
It was reported in the 13 June 1992 issue of Billboard that O'Brien had been appointed to the position of president for SRC (Sedona Recording Co.) which was based in Los Angeles. It had been reported previously by Cash Box that O'Brien's label had gone entered into a joint venture with BMG through Zoo Entertainment. At the time, artists on the label's roster included Cause & Effect, David Clayton-Thomas, The Def Dames and AFD.

O'Brien was involved in the additional production arrangement of the All-4-One single, "I Turn to You".

O'Brien produced thirteen of the fifteen tracks on the All-4-One album, On and On that was released in 1999. He was also the executive producer, and had a hand in mixing the track, "I Will Be Right Here".

=== 2000s ===
In 2006, Brookhill Records was involved in a legal issue with Atlantic Records.
