= Dunwich Records =

- Founded: 1965
- Founder: Bill Traut, Eddie Higgins, George Badonsky
- Status: Defunct
- Distributor(s): Atco Records
- Genre: Rock
- Country of origin: U.S.
- Location: Chicago, Illinois

Dunwich Records was an independent American record label started by Bill Traut, Eddie Higgins and George Badonsky in Chicago in 1965. Dunwich was also a production company which licensed recordings to other labels, including Atlantic, Atco, Columbia, Mercury and SGC. The label was primarily known for the release of singles from the emerging Chicago rock scene in the 1960s. Only two artists, the Shadows of Knight and Amanda Ambrose, released albums on the label.

== History ==
Traut, Higgins and Badonsky formed their first record label, Amboy, in 1963 and released recordings of themselves and other bands. In 1965 they changed the label's name to Dunwich, and in December released a cover version of Van Morrison's "Gloria" by the Chicago band Shadows of Knight. By the spring of 1966, the song was a hit. After some difficulty with nationwide distribution, Traut, Higgins and Badonsky made a distribution deal with Atlantic subsidiary Atco Records. By mid-1967 Traut and Badonsky bought out Higgins. Dunwich soon stopped releasing their own records, concentrating instead on producing a range of artists and leasing the master recordings to other labels. The Dunwich lute player logo appears on these recordings. Above the lute player is a cartoon type word balloon that says "It's DUNWICH, man." This logo may have been on a few other Chicago groups records, such as "The Cryan Shames" Columbia albums.

In the spring of 1968, Traut split with Badonsky, joined with producers Jim Golden and Bob Monaco and reorganized Dunwich Records into Dunwich Productions, Ltd. The three continued to produce Chicago-based groups, notably the bands Mason Proffit and Coven. The latter group released their first album in 1969 on the Mercury label, but with the Dunwich Productions logo. In 1971, Traut briefly revived the Dunwich label for a live recording of Chicago folk artists, Gathering at the Earl of Old Town, which notably includes the first recording of late singer-songwriter Steve Goodman performing "City of New Orleans". The Dunwich label was eventually absorbed by its distributor, Atco, which issued two final Shadows of Knight singles bearing the Dunwich logo, but issued on the Atco label. In 1971, Traut and Golden joined with Jerry Weintraub to form Wooden Nickel Records, whose early acts included the band Styx.

Since the Dunwich label released mostly singles, two collections released by Sundazed Music in the 1990s are considered to be quite important to appreciating the history of Dunwich Records and its contribution to music. Oh Yeah! The Best of Dunwich Records, Volume 1, was released in 1991. This was followed by If You're Ready! The Best of Dunwich Records, Volume 2, in 1994. Artists appearing on these records include The Shadows of Knight, The Knaves, The Pride & Joy, The Luv'd Ones, Saturday's Children, The Wanderin' Kind, The Rovin' Kind, The American Breed, the H. P. Lovecraft band, Sounds Unlimited, The Del Vetts, The Warner Brothers and Little Boy Blues. The albums were produced by Bill Traut and George Badonsky. An earlier collection of Dunwich singles had been released in 1971 on the Happy Tiger label as Early Chicago, Volume 1.

The label's name "Dunwich" refers to "The Dunwich Horror", a story by H. P. Lovecraft, The label's publishing arm, Yuggoth Music, was named after a fictional planet in Lovecraft's stories.

== Dunwich compilations ==
- Early Chicago, Volume 1 Happy Tiger, 1971
- The Dunwich Records Story Voxx Records, 1990
- Oh Yeah! The Best of Dunwich Records, Volume 1 Sundazed, 1991
- If You're Ready! The Best of Dunwich Records, Volume 2 Sundazed, 1994

== See also ==
- List of record labels
