= All-4-One discography =

This is the discography of American R&B group All-4-One. Since 1994, the band have released seven studio albums, one greatest hits compilation album, two live albums and one holiday album.

== Albums ==
=== Studio albums ===
| Title | Album details | Peak chart positions | | | | | | | | | | Certifications (sales threshold) |
| Title | Album details | US | US R&B | AUS | AUT | GER | NZ | NL | SWE | SWI | UK | Certifications (sales threshold) |
|---|---|---|---|---|---|---|---|---|---|---|---|---|
| All-4-One | Released: April 12, 1994; Label: Atlantic | 7 | 12 | 12 | 5 | 7 | 11 | 8 | 24 | 3 | 25 | RIAA: 4× Platinum; ARIA: Gold; MC: 3× Platinum |
| And the Music Speaks | Released: June 6, 1995; Label: Atlantic | 27 | 31 | 97 | — | 71 | 13 | — | — | 49 | — | RIAA: Platinum; MC: Gold |
| On and On | Released: June 8, 1999; Label: Atlantic | — | — | — | — | — | — | — | 88 | 71 | — | |
| A41 | Released: March 26, 2002; Label: American Music Corporation | — | — | — | — | — | — | — | — | — | — | |
| Split Personality | Released: May 31, 2004; Label: Universal | — | — | — | — | — | — | — | — | — | — | |
| No Regrets | Released: September 15, 2009; Label: Peak | — | 48 | — | — | — | — | — | — | — | — | |
| Twenty+ | Released: July 24, 2015; Label: AFO / Heavyweights Entertainment | — | — | — | — | — | — | — | — | — | — | |
"—" denotes releases that did not chart

=== Compilation albums ===
| Title | Album details |
|---|---|
| Greatest Hits | Released: August 31, 2004; Label: Atlantic |
| Rhino Hi-Five: All-4-One | Released: April 19, 2005; Label: Rhino Atlantic |
| Playlist: The Best of All-4-One | Released: July 15, 2016; Label: Atlantic |

=== Live albums ===
| Title | Album details |
|---|---|
| Live at the Hard Rock | Released: May 2, 2005; Label: WEA |
| S.O.U.L. | Released: October 22, 2013 |

=== Holiday albums ===
| Title | Album details | Peak chart positions | |
| Title | Album details | US | US R&B |
|---|---|---|---|
| An All-4-One Christmas | Released: October 10, 1995; Label: Atlantic | 91 | 87 |
| Christmas EP, Vol. One | Released: November 26, 2014; Label: AFO / Heavyweights Entertainment | — | — |

== Singles ==
| Year | Title | Peak chart positions | | | | | | | Certifications (sales thresholds) | Album |
| Year | Title | US | US R&B | US AC | AUS | GER | NZ | UK | Certifications (sales thresholds) | Album |
|---|---|---|---|---|---|---|---|---|---|---|
| 1994 | "So Much in Love" | 5 | 10 | — | 62 | 56 | 3 | 49 | RIAA: Gold | All-4-One |
| 1994 | "I Swear" | 1 | 13 | 1 | 1 | 1 | 1 | 2 | RIAA: Platinum; ARIA: 2× Platinum | All-4-One |
| 1994 | "Breathless" | — | 66 | — | — | — | — | — | | All-4-One |
| 1994 | "Something About You" | — | — | — | 98 | — | 20 | — | | All-4-One |
| 1994 | "(She's Got) Skillz" | 57 | 49 | — | — | — | 3 | — | | All-4-One |
| 1995 | "I Can Love You Like That" | 5 | 40 | 2 | 12 | 67 | 2 | 33 | RIAA: Gold; ARIA: Gold | And the Music Speaks |
| 1995 | "I'm Your Man" | — | 71 | — | — | — | 36 | — | | And the Music Speaks |
| 1996 | "These Arms" | — | — | — | — | — | — | — | | And the Music Speaks |
| 1996 | "Someday" | 30 | — | 14 | — | — | 41 | — | RIAA: Gold | The Hunchback of Notre Dame: An Original Walt Disney Records Soundtrack |
| 1997 | "I Turn to You" | — | — | — | — | — | — | — | | Space Jam soundtrack |
| 1999 | "I Will Be Right Here" | — | — | 24 | — | — | — | — | | On & On |
| 1999 | "Smile Like Mona Lisa" | — | — | — | — | — | — | — | | On & On |
| 1999 | "I Cross My Heart" | — | — | — | — | — | — | — | | On & On |
| 2002 | "Not Ready for Goodbye" | — | — | — | — | — | — | — | | A41 |
| 2002 | "Beautiful as U" | — | — | 13 | — | — | — | — | | A41 |
| 2004 | "Someone Who Lives in Your Heart" | — | — | — | — | — | — | — | | Split Personality |
| 2009 | "My Child" | — | 58 | — | — | — | — | — | | No Regrets |
| 2009 | "When I Needed an Angel" | — | — | — | — | — | — | — | | No Regrets |
| 2015 | "Baby Love" | — | — | — | — | — | — | — | | Twenty+ |
| 2016 | "Now That We're Together" | — | — | — | — | — | — | — | | Twenty+ |
"—" denotes releases that did not chart

== Other appearances ==
| Year | Song | Album |
|---|---|---|
| 1995 | "One Summer Night" | My Family: The Original Motion Picture Soundtrack |
| 1995 | "Tapestry" | Tapestry Revisited: A Tribute to Carole King |
| 1996 | "I Turn to You" | Space Jam: Music from and Inspired by the Motion Picture |
| 1996 | "Someday" | The Hunchback of Notre Dame: An Original Walt Disney Records Soundtrack |
| 1996 | "Something's Coming" | The Songs of West Side Story |
| 1997 | "Write Your Name (Across My Heart)" (Kenny Rogers featuring All-4-One) | Across My Heart |
| 1998 | "Smoke Gets in Your Eyes" (Julio Iglesias and All-4-One) | My Life: The Greatest Hits |
| 1998 | "Love Shouldn't Hurt" (with Michael Bolton, Tamia, and Olivia Newton-John) | Love Shouldn't Hurt |
| 2000 | "Georgia on My Mind" (Steve Tyrell and All-4-One) | Hanging Up: Original Motion Picture Soundtrack |
| 2005 | "I Swear" | Just Friends: Original Motion Picture Soundtrack |

== Music videos ==
| Year | Song |
|---|---|
| 1994 | "So Much in Love" |
| 1994 | "I Swear" |
| 1994 | "Something About You" |
| 1994 | "A Better Man" |
| 1995 | "(She's Got) Skillz" |
| 1995 | "I Can Love You Like That" |
| 1995 | "The First Noel" |
| 1996 | "These Arms" |
| 1996 | "Someday" |
| 1996 | "I Turn to You" |
| 1998 | "Smile Like Mona Lisa" |
| 1998 | "I Will Be Right Here" |
| 1998 | "I Cross My Heart" (featuring Sammi Cheng) |
| 2004 | "Someone Who Lives In Your Heart" |
| 2009 | "My Child" |
| 2015 | "Baby Love" |
| 2015 | "Now That We're Together" |
| 2021 | "It's All There (I Swear Remix for Xbox All-Access)" |
