= So Much in Love (disambiguation) =

"So Much in Love" is a song first released by The Tymes in 1963.

So Much in Love may also refer to:

- So Much in Love (Ray Conniff album), 1961
- So Much in Love (The Tymes album), 1963
- "So Much In Love", by Sheena Easton from Take My Time
- "So Much in Love", by D.O.D., 2023

== See also ==
- So Much Love (disambiguation)
