= No Sleep (LaViVe album) =

Studio album by LaViVe
- Released: 17 December 2010
- Genre: Dance-pop
- Length: 44:23
- Label: Starwatch
- Producer: Various: Adrian Sînă; Andrei Maria; Bogdan Albulescu; Corina Ciorbă; Șerban Cazan; Laurentiu Duță; Martin "Fly" Fliegenschmidt; Henrik Kersten; Jens Rodenberg; Denis the Menace; Connect-R; Kim Wennerström; Jorden Milnes; Tudor Ionescu; Dan Deneș; Gary Baker; ArtScam

Singles from No Sleep
- 1. "No Time for Sleeping" Released: 10 December 2010

No Sleep is the only studio album recorded by German girl group LaViVe, released on 17 December 2010 on digital and physical formats by Starwatch Music. LaViVe was formed on the ninth installment of the German adaptation of the international television talent show Popstars in 2010, and consisted of four members. Musically, No Sleep was described as a dance-pop album with Eurodance influences. Several covers were recorded for the album of material released by Romanian acts Akcent, Corina, Connect-R and Fly Project, as well as by American singer John Michael Montgomery.

Music critics met No Sleep with mixed reviews, widely noting its lack of profundity, but pointing out the tracks "Keep On", "Hurtful" and "I Swear" as highlights. Commercially, the record attained minor success, reaching the top 50 in Germany and Austria, and the top 100 in Switzerland. No Sleep was aided by the release of one single, "No Time for Sleeping" (2010), which peaked within the top 30 in the aforementioned countries. "I Swear" was also made available as a promotional single to minor success in Germany.

== Background and composition ==
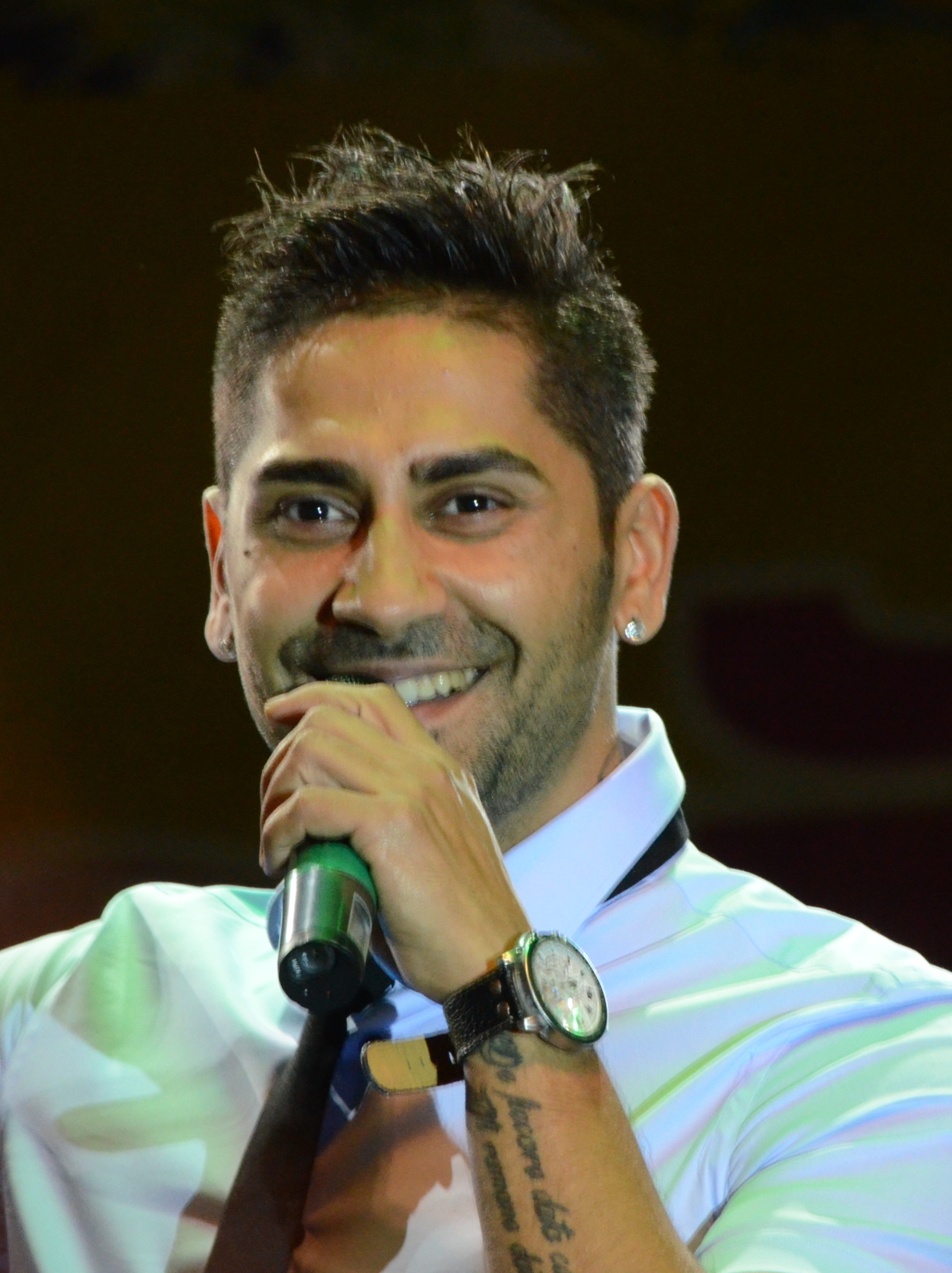
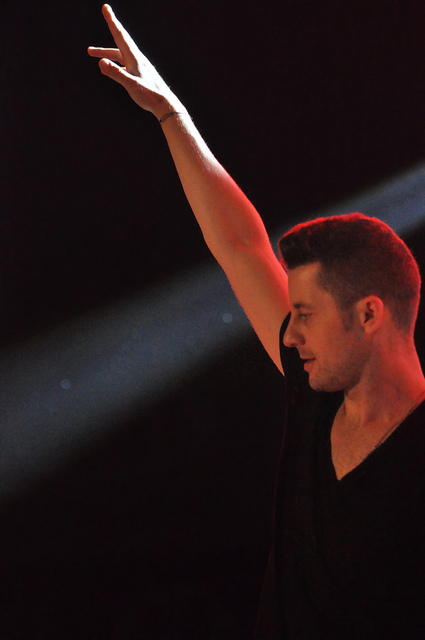
No Sleep contains several covers of material released by Romanian artists including Connect-R (left) and Akcent (right).

German girl group LaViVe was formed on the ninth installment of the German adaptation of the international television talent show Popstars in 2010, consisting of Meike Ehnert, Sarah Rensing, Julia Köster and Katrin Mehlberg. Their debut and sole studio album No Sleep was released on digital and physical formats on 17 December 2010 by Starwatch Music in Germany.

No Sleep has been described as a mainstream-fashioned dance-pop album with eurodance influences. Its opening track "How Deep Is Your Love" is a cover of Romanian group Akcent's 2010 single of the same name. Musically, it is an uptempo eurodance-influenced song containing an accordion and synthesizers in its instrumentation; LaViVe's vocals are processed with various filters. It is followed by "No Time for Sleeping", a cover of Romanian singer Corina's 2010 single "No Sleepin'", which is a synthpop-influenced uptempo dance song featuring discreet piano and a prominent clink sound. "Keep On" and "Hurtful" are similarly both dance recordings. Other songs covered by LaViVe for No Sleep are "Burning Love" (2009) by Romanian singer Connect-R, "Unisex" (2009) by Romanian duo Fly Project and "I Swear" (1993) by American artist John Michael Montgomery. The latter features vocals from the final eleven contestants of the ninth installment of Popstars, credited as "Popstars".

== Reception ==
Upon its release, No Sleep was met with mixed response from music critics. Josef Gasteiger of German magazine Laut criticized the album's content and its lyrics as "boring", while pointing out the lack of profundity and stating that the songs sounded like demo versions. He further suggested that "Keep On" and "Hurtful" would have sounded better as ballads, and picked "I Swear" as the highlight on the album. Christopher Polusik, writing for T-Online, negatively commented on how the short recording impacted on the album's production. He lauded the tracks "Keep On", "Hurtful" and "I Swear" for showcasing LaViVe's vocals.

Commercially, No Sleep attained minor success on record charts. In Germany, the record debuted and peaked at number 44, leaving after four weeks. It also reached number two on GfK Entertainment's Newcomer component chart. No Sleep debuted at number 47 in Austria and climbed to its peak position at number 42 the next week, exiting the ranking after a total of four editions. The record further reached position 83 in Switzerland in its sole charting week. One single has been released from No Sleep, "No Time for Sleeping", which reached the top 30 in the aforementioned countries. "I Swear" was also promotionally made available, peaking at number 69 in Germany.

== Track listing ==
Credits adapted from the liner notes of No Sleep.

No.	Title	Writer(s)	Producer(s)	Length
1.	"How Deep Is Your Love"	Adrian Sînă; Marius Moga	Sînă	3:43
2.	"No Time for Sleeping"	Andrei Maria; Corina Ciorbă; Joanna Oegar	Maria; Bogdan Albulescu; Ciorbă; Șerban Cazan	3:31
3.	"Rock That City"	Laurentiu Duță; Adam Powers	Duță	3:18
4.	"Keep On"	Martin "Fly" Fliegenschmidt; Fiora Cutler; Ron Dohanetz	Fliegenschmidt; Henrik Kersten; Jens Rodenberg	3:45
5.	"Ufo"	Denis Zet; Rocco Horn; Sarah West	Denis The Menace	2:58
6.	"Burning Love"	Connect-R	Connect-R	3:45
7.	"Hurtful"	Tysper; Mack; Grizzly; Hassle	Kim Wennerström	3:02
8.	"Play Dumb"	Jorden Milnes; Jasmine Baird	Milnes	3:00
9.	"Unisex"	Tudor Ionescu; Dan Deneș	Ionescu; Deneș	3:18
10.	"Empire of Love"	Gary Baker; Matt Johnson; Josh Haselton	Baker; ArtScam	3:28
11.	"Will You Go With Me"	Baker; Johnson; Kevin Richardson	Baker; ArtScam	4:04
12.	"I Swear" (featuring Popstars)	Baker; Frank J. Myers	Baker	4:03

== Charts ==
Chart (2010–2011)	Peak position
Austrian Albums (Ö3 Austria)	42
German Albums (Offizielle Top 100)	44
Germany Newcomer (GfK Entertainment)	2
Swiss Albums (Schweizer Hitparade)	83

== Release history ==
Region	Date	Format	Label
Germany	17 December 2010	CD	Starwatch
Germany	17 December 2010	Digital download	Starwatch
