= No Sleep =

No Sleep may refer to:

== Music ==
- No Sleep (LaViVe album), 2010
- No Sleep (Volumes album), 2014
- "No Sleep" (Jebediah song), 2004
- "No Sleep" (Martin Garrix song), featuring Bonn, 2019
- "No Sleep" (Wiz Khalifa song), 2011
- "No Sleep", a song by Sway from the 2013 EP Wake Up
- "No Sleep", a song by Magic! from the 2016 album Primary Colours
- "No Sleep", a song by Sam Roberts from the 2003 album We Were Born in a Flame
- "No Sleep", a song by Twin Atlantic from the 2016 album GLA
- No Sleep Records, a Californian independent record label

== Other uses ==
- "No Sleep" (Breeders), a 2020 television episode
- r/nosleep, a horror fiction subreddit
- The NoSleep Podcast, a horror podcast

== See also ==
- "No Sleeep", a 2015 song by Janet Jackson
- "No Sleepin'", a 2010 song by singer Corina and rapper JJ
- No No Sleep, a 2015 short film
- Insomnia
  - Sleep deprivation
