= An All-4-One Christmas =

Studio album by All-4-One
- Released: October 10, 1995
- Recorded: 1995
- Genre: R&B, christmas
- Label: Atlantic/WEA
- Producer: Tim O'Brien, Gary St. Clair

All-4-One chronology
And the Music Speaks (1995)	An All-4-One Christmas (1995)	On and On (1999)

Professional ratings
Review scores
Source	Rating
Allmusic	2.5/5 stars

An All-4-One Christmas is the third studio album and first Christmas album by All-4-One, released on October 10, 1995 by Atlantic Records and WEA.

== Track listing ==
1. "Silent Night" (Traditional, arr. Rick Kellis) – 2:50
2. "This Christmas" (Donny Hathaway, Nadine Mckinnor) – 5:22
3. "The First Noel" (Traditional, arr. Rick Kellis) – 4:07
4. "The Christmas Song (Chestnuts Roasting on an Open Fire)" (Mel Tormé, Robert Wells) – 4:06
5. "Santa Claus Is Coming to Town" (Haven Gillespie, J. Fred Coots) – 4:07
6. "Mary's Little Boy Child" (Jester Hairston) – 4:30
7. "What Child Is This? (Greensleeves)" (Traditional, arr. Carl Wurtz) – 4:30
8. "Rudolph the Red-Nosed Reindeer/Frosty the Snowman" (Johnny Marks/Jack Rollins, Steve Nelson) – 4:06
9. "O Come All Ye Faithful" (Traditional, arr. Rick Kellis) – 3:30
10. "When You Wish Upon a Star" (Leigh Harline, Ned Washington) – 3:29
11. "Christmas with My Baby" (James Guillory, Jamie Jones) – 4:23
12. "We Wish You a Merry Christmas" (Traditional, arr. Rick Kellis) – 2:09
