= Fear No More =

Fear No More may refer to:

- Fear No More (film), a 1961 American film starring Mala Powers
- "Fear No More", a song by Stephen Sondheim in Shakespeare Revue
- "Fear No More" (Desperate Housewives), an episode of Desperate Housewives
- "Fear No More", a song by All-4-One from the 1998 album On and On (All-4-One album)
- Fear No More (album), by The Afters (2019)

== See also ==
- "Fear no more the heat o' the sun", a song in Shakespeare's play Cymbeline
