= A41 (album) =

Studio album by All-4-One
- Released: March 26, 2002
- Recorded: 2001–2002
- Genre: R&B
- Label: American Music Corp

All-4-One chronology
| On and On (1999) | A41 (2002) | Split Personality (2004) |

Professional ratings
Review scores
| Source | Rating |
|---|---|
| AllMusic | 2/5 stars |

A41 is the fifth studio album by All-4-One. It was released on March 26, 2002, and marks their first independent release. It features the singles "Not Ready 4 Goodbye" and the top 20 Adult Contemporary hit "Beautiful as U".

== Track listing ==
1. "Green Light"
2. "Not Ready 4 Goodbye"
3. "Heaven Sent"
4. "Friday Night"
5. "I Just Wanna Be Your Everything"
6. "Beautiful as U"
7. "Open Up Your Eyes"
8. "I Am Blessed"
9. "Before U, Without U, After U"
10. "Round & Round"
11. "Between Us"
