= The Tymes =

American soul vocal group

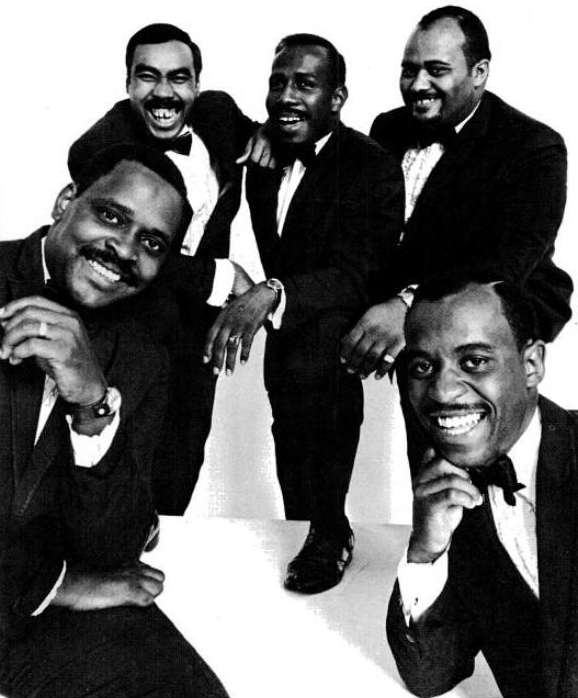
- The Tymes in 1969

Background information
- Origin: Philadelphia, Pennsylvania, U.S.
- Genres: R&B; soul
- Years active: 1956–present
- Labels: Cameo-Parkway; Columbia; RCA; MGM; ABKCO
- Members: Al "Ceasar" Berry; Norman Burnett: John Stone
- Past members: Donald Banks; George Hilliard; George Williams; Charles Nixon; Isabelle Coles; Jerry Ferguson; Wade Davis; Ron E. Richardson; Terri Gonzalez

The Tymes are an American soul vocal group who enjoyed equal success in the United Kingdom and in their homeland. They are one of the few acts to have one chart-topper in both the US and UK with different songs.

== Early career ==
The group was formed in Philadelphia, Pennsylvania, in 1956 as the Latineers, by Donald Banks (bass), Albert Berry (first tenor), Norman Burnett (baritone), and George Hilliard (second tenor). After a four-year stint on Philadelphia's club circuit, they recruited a new lead vocalist, George Williams in 1960, and changed their name to the Tymes.

The Tymes had hits in the UK in the 1960s with songs such as "So Much in Love", a US chart-topper and million-seller in 1963, "Wonderful! Wonderful!" (a remake of the Johnny Mathis hit from 1957), "Somewhere", then in the 1970s with "You Little Trustmaker" and "Ms Grace". The last of these became the group's biggest UK hit, reaching number one on the UK Singles Chart in 1975, but barely dented the Billboard Hot 100, long after the success of "So Much in Love". "Ms Grace", while only charting modestly in the US, was and remains a regional hit with the Carolina Beach Music scene. By 1976, Albert Berry and George Hilliard had been replaced with female singers Terri Gonzales and Melanie Moore. Gonzales later recorded a solo album with Nile Rodgers while Moore worked as session vocalist with Kleeer and artists such as Chaka Khan.

The Tymes were also the Jewels (obviously not to be confused with the R&B girl group the Jewels), as in Billy Abbott and the Jewels, whose only Hot 100 and Cashbox Top 100 entry was "Groovy Baby" in July 1963.

In 1963, American Bandstand signed the Tymes to Dick Clark's Caravan of Stars national US tour.

== Later career ==
In 1980, a single, "Brothers And Sisters" b/w "Louise" was released in the UK on Hammer HS 311. It was credited to The Tymes Featuring George Williams. The A side was very much in the Drifters' UK period vein.

Their song "So Much in Love" was elected to the Songs of the Century in 2001. In 2005, the Tymes were inducted into the Vocal Group Hall of Fame. The Tymes continue to perform with surviving original members Berry and Burnett. The group appeared on the 2003 PBS special My Music: Love Songs of the 50s and 60s, one of the last times all five original members performed live.

== Original members ==
- George Williams (born George Reginald Williams Jr, December 6, 1935, Philadelphia — died July 28, 2004, Maple Shade, New Jersey) – lead vocals
- Albert Berry (born Albert Alexander III, March 17, 1941) – first tenor
- George Hilliard (born 1941 — died September 24, 2014, age 73) – second tenor
- Norman Burnett (born May 5, 1943) – baritone
- Donald Banks (born October 29, 1939 — died October 7, 2011, aged 72) – bass

== Discography ==
=== Studio albums ===
Year	Album	Chart positions	
Year	Album	US 200	US R&B
1963	So Much in Love	15	—
1964	The Sound of the Wonderful Tymes	117	—
1964	Somewhere	122	—
1969	People	—	—
1974	Trustmaker	—	46
1976	Turning Point	—	—
1976	Tymes Up	—	40
1977	Diggin' Their Roots	—	—
"—" denotes releases that did not chart.

=== 1960s singles ===
Year	Single (A-side, B-side) Both sides from same album except where indicated	Chart positions				Album
Year	Single (A-side, B-side) Both sides from same album except where indicated	US Hot 100	US R&B	US Adult	UK	Album
1963	"So Much in Love" b/w "Roscoe James McClain" (Non-album track)	1	4	—	21	So Much in Love
1963	"Wonderful! Wonderful!" b/w "Come With Me to the Sea" (from The Sound of the Wonderful Tymes and Somewhere)	7	23	2	—	So Much in Love
1963	"Somewhere" b/w "View from My Window" (from Tymes Biggest Hits)	19	—	—	—	Somewhere
1963	"Isle of Love" b/w "I'm Always Chasing Rainbows"	—	—	—	—	Somewhere
1964	"To Each His Own" b/w "Wonderland of Love"	78	—	—	—	Non-album tracks
1964	"The Magic of Our Summer Love" b/w "With All My Heart"	99	—	—	—	Non-album tracks
1964	"Here She Comes" b/w "Malibu"	92	—	—	—	Non-album tracks
1964	"The Twelfth of Never" b/w "Here She Comes" (Non-album track)	—	—	—	—	So Much in Love
1966	"Pretend" b/w "Street Talk"	—	—	—	—	Non-album tracks
1966	"A Touch of Baby" b/w "What Would I Do"	—	—	—	—	Non-album tracks
1967	"This Time It's Love" b/w "These Foolish Things (Remind Me of You)"	—	—	—	—	Non-album tracks
1968	"People" b/w "For Love of Ivy"	39	33	—	16	People
1969	"God Bless the Child" b/w "The Love That You're Looking For" (Ain't Gonna Find It Here)	—	—	—	—	People
1969	"If You Love Me Baby" b/w "Find My Way"	—	—	—	—	Non-album track
"—" denotes releases that did not chart or were not released in that territory.

=== 1970s singles ===
Year	Single (A-side, B-side) Both sides from same album except where indicated	Chart positions				Certifications	Album
Year	Single (A-side, B-side) Both sides from same album except where indicated	US Hot 100	US R&B	AUS	UK	Certifications	Album
1970	"Most Beautiful Married Lady" b/w "Love Child"	—	—	—	—		Non-album tracks
1971	"She's Gone" b/w "Someone to Watch Over Me"	—	—	—	—		Non-album tracks
1974	"You Little Trustmaker" b/w "The North Hills"	12	20	57	18		Trustmaker
1974	"Ms Grace" b/w "The Crutch"	91	75	59	1	BPI: Silver	Trustmaker
1975	"Someway, Somehow I'm Keepin' You" b/w "Interloop!"	—	—	—	—		Trustmaker
1975	"God's Gonna Punish You" b/w "If I Can't Make You Smile"	—	—	—	41		Tymes Up
1976	"It's Cool" b/w "Good Morning Dear Lord"	68	3	—	—		Tymes Up
1976	"Only Your Love" b/w "Goin' Through the Motions"	—	—	—	—		Tymes Up
1976	"Savannah Sunny Sunday" b/w "Love's Illusion"	—	—	—	—		Turning Point
1977	"How Am I to Know (The Things a Girl in Love Should Know)" b/w "I'll Take You There"	—	—	—	—		Diggin' Their Roots
"—" denotes releases that did not chart or were not released in that territory.

== See also ==
- List of artists who reached number one in the United States
- List of artists who reached number one in Ireland
- List of artists who reached number one on the UK Singles Chart
- List of performers on Top of the Pops
