= Popstars: Girls forever =

Season of television series

- Created by: Jonathan Dowling
- Starring: Detlef "D!" Soost; Marta Jandová; Thomas Stein
- Opening theme: "This Is Me" (episodes 1–16) "No Time for Sleeping" (final only)
- Country of origin: Germany
- No. of episodes: 17

Production
- Camera setup: Multi-camera
- Running time: 135 / 96 minutes

Original release
- Network: ProSieben; VIVA (re-run)
- Release: 19 August – 9 December 2010

Related
- Popstars: Du & Ich; Popstars: Der Weg ist das Ziel

Popstars: Girls forever is the ninth season of the German TV show Popstars, in which young aspiring female singers/dancers competed in order to claim their spots to make it into the next girl group. The contestants, who also lived together during the course of the series, were groomed and judged by choreographer Detlef D! Soost, and were judged on their vocal and dancing ability by manager Thomas Stein, who had previously been a judge on the first two seasons of Deutschland sucht den Superstar, and "Die Happy"-singer Marta Jandová, who is also about to write songs for the final band. This is the format for the ninth season of the Popstars series, focusing mostly on female dancers/singers, looking for fame in the music industry. This season's catch phrase is "Follow the Star". The season's promotional songs were Gabriella Cilmi's "On a Mission" redeemed by Monrose with "This Is Me", which also serves as the opening theme.

The show ran from Thursday, 19 August 2010, to 9 December 2010 on Pro7. The show will be repeated on VIVA on the following Friday, Sunday and Tuesday. Auditions were held in 16 German cities, not involving the judges appearing on TV, and through Online-Casting. The last chance to audition were four audition-dates in Offenbach and Duisburg in front of the real judges.

A so-called "Talent Check" was held after the castings to see which girls were talented enough to be a popstar. The "Talent Check" was followed by four weeks of workshop in a band-house in Munich. The remaining girls were invited to Nashville, Tennessee, United States, for another kind of workshop in another luxurious band-house. Following those eight weeks of workshop were four weeks of live shows for the remaining girls. During the live shows the audience decided the name of the band and which four girls would form the new band (the members by televoting the name by voting on the official site). Throughout the live shows the girls were coached by stars and also performed with them on-stage.

== Contestants ==
=== Successful contestants ===
- Sarah Rensing (22), cosmetician from Ahlen. She was announced the first band member of LaVive in the Live Show I. A reception two days later was organised for Sarah Rensing in Ahlen's town hall.
- Meike Ehnert (23), babysitter from Schwarzenbach. She was announced the second band member of LaVive in the Live Show II.
- Julia Köster (17), student from Oberhausen. She was announced the third band member of LaVive in the Live Show III.
- Katrin Mehlberg (19), student from Duisburg. She was announced the fourth band member of LaVive in the Live Show IV.

=== Eliminated contestants ===
- Esra Ünver (16), student from Moers, was eliminated after her third performance in the Live Show IV.
- Pascaline N'Sanda (19), student from Hennef, was eliminated after her second performance in the Live Show IV.
- Yonca Cakmak (22), student from Kassel, was eliminated after her first performance in the Live Show IV.
- Diba Hakimi (20), office clerk from Hamburg, was eliminated after her performance in the Live Show III.
- Jenny Gerdts (26), dental assistant from Hemmoor, was eliminated after her performance in the Live Show II.
- Claudia Markow (26), travel agent from Stuttgart, was eliminated after her performance in the Live Show I.
- Ines (23), prospective nursery nurse, was eliminated after her performance in the Girls@Work Band-house IV.
- Isabelle (23), student from Mainz-Kastel, originally from Switzerland, was eliminated after her performance in the Girls@Work Band-house II.
- Sonni (18), apprentice from Mannheim, was eliminated after her performance in the Girls@Work Band-house I.
- Jessica (20), student from Fulda, came into competition through an online-casting but withdrew before travelling to the Girls@Work Workshop in Nashville.
- Rosalie (16), from Aachen, originally from Democratic Republic of the Congo, was eliminated after her performance in the Workshop IV.
- Sash (19), barber apprentice from Aachen, was eliminated after her performance in the Workshop III.
- Angel-Ann (18), student from Herten, was eliminated after her performance in the Workshop III.
- Maria (19), potential student from Flörsheim, originally from Italy, came into competition through an online-casting, but was eliminated after her performance in the Workshop II.
- Jasmin Hafidi (19), from Wiesbaden, was eliminated after her performance in the Workshop I.
- Milka (22), barber apprentice from Lindenschied, had a dispute with Detlef "D!" Soost after her elimination after her performance in the Workshop I, because of her surprising exit.
- Dilara (16), student from Ludwigshafen am Rhein likes singing, swimming and shopping, and was eliminated after her performance in the Talent Check.
- Chantal (17), student from Oberasbach, having roots in America, likes dancing, singing and meeting friends, and was eliminated after her performance in the Talent Check.
- Denise (19), from Lüdenscheid came into competition through an online-casting, but was eliminated after her performance in the Talent Check.
- Gloria Wind (26), from Hamburg came into competition through an online-casting, but withdrew before the training for the Talent Check performance began.
- Betty (23), student from Hamburg, made it through the auditions, but withdrew and did not appear at the Talent Check.

(Ages stated are at time of contest)

== Episodes ==
=== Episode 01: Casting I ===
First Aired: 19 August 2010

The jury is very surprised by Meike because of her great voice. As the jury couldn't decide whether Betty or Svenja should get the chance to attend the Talent Check, they let them have a singing battle, for which they were coached by Marit Larsen.

Selected 5: Dilara, Meike, Rosalie, Claudia, Betty

=== Episode 02: Casting II ===
First Aired: 26 August 2010

The singing battle was fought between Ita and Angel-Ann. They were coached by Monrose.

Selected 5: Isabelle, Sonni, Sarah, Yonca, Angel-Ann

=== Episode 03: Casting III ===
First Aired: 2 September 2010

The singing battle was held between Esra and Jasmin. The girls were coached by Aura Dione for their battle.

Selected: Milka, Jenny, Pascaline, Katrin, Esra

=== Episode 04: Casting IV ===
First Aired: 9 September 2010

Sash and Gloria were coached by Gabriella Cilmi for their battle.

Selected: Diba, Ines, Jasmin, Chantal, Julia, Sash

=== Episode 05: Talent Check ===
First Aired: 16 September 2010

In addition to the personal castings there were online castings held for four weeks. The girls chosen by the jury were Maria, Denise, Gloria, Jessica.

Critical audience, prominent visitations and another rivalry: The 21 potential Popstars that were selected at the auditions, met each other in Munich for the first time. Before this week's groups were announced, the judges had a surprise for the girls: The online contestants were introduced to the other girls at the Talent Check. Every girl had to sing in front of the jury again. Gloria was given bad criticism and withdrew. The girls performed on stage in front of their families and friends for the first time. Scottish singer Amy Macdonald supported the potentials and gave some advice. Denise, Chantal and Dilara were eliminated.

Group 1
Song	"Like a Prayer"
Artist	Madonna
Performers	Meike, Jenny, Diba, Isabell, Denise

Group 2
Song	"Everytime We Touch"
Artist	Cascada
Performers	Angel-Ann, Maria, Claudia, Sarah

Group 3
Song	"Tik Tok"
Artist	Ke$ha
Performers	Sash, Rosalie, Sonni, Yonca, Esra

Group 4
Song	"Alejandro"
Artist	Lady Gaga
Performers	Dilara, Milka, Chantal, Ines

Group 5
Song	"Krieger des Lichts"
Artist	Silbermond
Performers	Pascaline, Jessica, Katrin, Julia, Jasmin

=== Episode 06: Workshop I – "Spotlight" ===
First Aired: 23 September 2010

The girls were coached by Ne-Yo, e.g. they had to remove all their make up and sing an acoustic-version of a very personal song and show their emotions in a close-up. There was dispute between the girls as they all live in one house. Jasmin and Milka were eliminated.

Group 1
Song	"I'm So Excited"
Artist	The Pointer Sisters
Performers	Esra, Pascaline, Sash and Maria

Group 2
Song	"Wunder gescheh'n"
Artist	Nena
Performers	Claudia, Isabelle, Sarah and Jessy

Group 3
Song	"Can't Get You Out of My Head"
Artist	Kylie Minogue
Performers	Diba, Soni, Angel Ann and Katrin

Group 4
Song	"Angels"
Artist	Robbie Williams
Performers	Milka, Julia, Jenny and Meike

Group 5
Song	"Rude Boy"
Artist	Rihanna
Performers	Rosalie, Ines, Yonca and Jasmin

=== Episode 07: Workshop II – "The Look" ===
First Aired: 30 September 2010

The girls got a haircut and trained their skills in different music video shoots ("California Gurls" by Katy Perry, "Whenever, Wherever" by Shakira, "Earth Song" by Michael Jackson and "Numb" by U2). After having an allergic reaction Ines was rushed to a hospital. She didn't perform with the other girls but was given the option to come back as soon as she was well again. Rosalie caused some trouble as she broke the rules and left the house. She stated to want to go home but stayed anyway. Kim Wilde helped the girls look-wise. Maria was eliminated.

Group 1
Song	"Vom Selben Stern"
Artist	Ich + Ich
Performers	Meike, Diba, Sash and Maria

Group 2
Song	"Girls Just Want to Have Fun"
Artist	Cyndi Lauper
Performers	Katrin, Esra, Julia and Isabelle

Group 3
Song	"Don't Speak"
Artist	No Doubt
Performers	Jenny, Pascaline, Sarah, Angel-Ann and Sonni

Group 4
Song	"About You Now"
Artist	Sugababes
Performers	Jessica, Claudia, Yonca and Rosalie

=== Episode 08: Workshop III – "Under Pressure" ===
First Aired: 7 October 2010

The girls were taught by Regina Halmich and Culcha Candela. Rosalie and Katrin, who were estranged since the last episode, conciliated. Angel-Ann was replaced as bandleader due to her weak leading abilities. Diba was made bandleader instead. Ines recovered and moved back into the house. Angel-Ann and Sash were eliminated. After the elimination Sash was accused for stealing stuff from the other girls.

Group 1
Song	"Let's Get Loud"
Artist	Jennifer Lopez
Performers	Sarah, Yonca, Sonni and Claudia

Group 2
Song	"...Baby One More Time"
Artist	Britney Spears
Performers	Diba, Esra, Angel-Ann and Sash

Group 3
Song	"When I Look at You"
Artist	Miley Cyrus
Performers	Julia, Meike, Jenny and Katrin

Group 4
Song	"Geile Zeit"
Artist	Juli
Performers	Isabelle, Ines, Jessica, Pascaline and Rosalie

=== Episode 09: Workshop IV – "Golden Voices" ===
First Aired: 14 October 2010

After having been brought to a church by judge Marta, the girls got to meet Paul Potts and had to sing an acoustic version of either "Hallelujah" or "Ave Maria" in the same church. Rosalie once again disrupted her group by disputing with Pascaline and several other candidates. The girls moved out of their house and travelled to a dripstone cave inside which they performed their songs. The girls' families came to watch the show, Meike was the only one not to have attendants. Every group was praised for their performance. Esra burnt her arm during their group's performance because she was positioned near the fire and refused to move away because she didn't want to break the performance. This example of her 180°-Twist in teamwork was positively mentioned by D. After having been eliminated, Rosalie suffered a nervous breakdown.

Group 1
Song	"Empire State Of Mind Pt. 2"
Artist	Alicia Keys
Performers	Ines, Katrin, Julia

Group 2
Song	"I Want to Know What Love Is"
Artist	Foreigner
Performers	Sonni, Isabelle, Meike, Sarah

Group 3
Song	"Time After Time"
Artist	Cyndi Lauper
Performers	Yonca, Jenny, Diba, Claudia

Group 4
Song	"Everybody Hurts"
Artist	R.E.M.
Performers	Pascaline, Rosalie, Esra, Jessy

=== Episode 10: Girls@Work I – "Let Me Entertain You" ===
First Aired: 21 October 2010

Jessica withdrew. The girls travelled to Nashville and moved into another kind of bandhouse. Meike was the last one to move into a room with the other girls and was therefore criticized again for being a self-inflicted outsider. Robbie Williams was the artist coaching them this week. He was specially fond of Esra, described her as naughty and charismatic and chose her along with Meike, Sarah and Isabelle to perform his song "Feel". The girls were brought to a famous recording studio and got the chance to get a salaried job. Pascaline, Jenny and Yonca got the job and therefore recorded a song. Sonni was eliminated.

Group 1
Song	"Broken-Hearted Girl"
Artist	Beyoncé Knowles
Performers	Katrin, Claudia, Diba

Group 2
Song	"Feel"
Artist	Robbie Williams
Performers	Meike, Esra, Isabelle, Sarah

Group 3
Song	"These Boots Are Made for Walkin'"
Artist	Nancy Sinatra / Jessica Simpson
Performers	Yonca, Ines, Sonni

Group 4
Song	"American Pie"
Artist	Madonna
Performers	Pascaline, Julia, Jenny

=== Episode 11: Girls@Work II – "Express Yourself" ===
First Aired: 28 October 2010

The girls got to meet Kevin Richardson, former member of Backstreet Boys. After performing their favourite song for him, he chose four girls, Julia, about whom he said she had the best voice, Meike, Katrin and Claudia, to sing backing vocals for his new song. This week's band-leaders, Julia, Yonca, Ines and Sarah, got to meet Maroon 5 and sing backing vocals for their rehearsal, however they had to act as the band's roadies. After doing a rehearsal of their performances in front of all the other girls, Detlef D! Soost asked the girls to each tell him in front of the entire group the two girls they could imagine least to be in a band with. Everyone chose Esra and, along with Meike herself, Meike. Isabelle was eliminated.

Group 1
Song	"Black Velvet"
Artist	Alannah Myles, Robin Lee Bruce
Performers	Julia, Pascaline, Katrin

Group 2
Song	"Can't Fight the Moonlight"
Artist	LeAnn Rimes
Performers	Sarah, Meike, Jenny

Group 3
Song	"Please Don't Leave Me"
Artist	Pink
Performers	Yonca, Esra, Isabelle

Group 4
Song	"Express Yourself"
Artist	Madonna
Performers	Ines, Diba, Claudia

=== Episode 12: Girls@Work III – "Country Feeling" ===
First Aired: 4 November 2010

Detlef D! Soost announced that one of the girls gets to sing the American national anthem ahead of a football game at the Vanderbilt Stadium in Nashville. Sarah was the one who got the job. For another job, recording a song for the soundtrack of German comedy Hanni & Nanni, the girls had to perform their favourite song in front of the client again. Sarah and Julia were the ones who got the job and therefore recorded a song. On the following day, the girls had to perform country-songs with backing bands in so-called honky-tonks and had to collect money for their show. Therefore, the girls were split into groups. The group who earned the most consisted of Katrin, Yonca and Diba. Throughout the week Meike has been criticized for being an outsider again. For this week's performances the girls sang with Meg Pfeiffer and her band. No one was eliminated.

Group 1
Song	"I Kissed A Girl"
Artist	Katy Perry
Performers	Yonca, Julia, Meike, Diba

Group 2
Song	"Maneater"
Artist	Nelly Furtado
Performers	Ines, Sarah, Jenny, Esra

Group 3
Song	"Poker Face"
Artist	Lady Gaga
Performers	Katrin, Pascaline, Claudia

=== Episode 13: Girls@Work IV – "Showdown" ===
First Aired: 11 November 2010

This week's band-leaders, Jenny, Diba and Pascaline, were invited to an American breakfast television-show where they had to promote their upcoming performances. The girls got to record a song together, a cover of hit single I Swear by All-4-One. Three of the girls, Julia, Esra and Jenny, got to perform Smile by and with Uncle Kracker. During the actual show there girls got to perform Hey, Soul Sister by and with Train. Ines was eliminated.

Group 1
Song	"Hedonism"
Artist	Skunk Anansie
Performers	Pascaline, Julia, Esra

Group 2
Song	"Lose My Breath"
Artist	Destiny's Child
Performers	Diba, Yonca, Ines, Katrin

Group 3
Song	"Un-Break My Heart"
Artist	Toni Braxton
Performers	Jenny, Meike, Sarah, Claudia

=== Episode 14: Liveshow I ===
First Aired: 18 November 2010

After a one-week voting on the official Pro7-homepage, the band name "LaViVe" was revealed. The girls performed their cover of "I Swear" with Gary Baker. Robbie Williams and Gary Barlow performed their song "Shame". The girls did solo performances. Claudia was eliminated and it was revealed that Sarah was the first band member.

Draw	Artist	Song (original artists)	Result
1	Katrin	"Only Girl (In the World)" (Rihanna)	Safe
2	Esra	"The Show" (Lenka)	Safe
3	Claudia	"We've Got Tonight" (Ronan Keating)	Eliminated
4	Julia	"What's Love Got to Do with It" (Tina Turner)	Safe
5	Yonca	"Teenage Dream" (Katy Perry)	Safe
6	Meike	"Bleeding Love" (Leona Lewis)	Safe
7	Jenny	"Evacuate the Dancefloor" (Cascada)	Safe
8	Diba	"She Said" (Plan B)	Safe
9	Pascaline	"Baby Can I Hold You" (Tracy Chapman)	Safe
10	Sarah	"I Wanna Dance with Somebody (Who Loves Me)" (Whitney Houston)	Band member

=== Episode 15: Liveshow II ===
First Aired: 25 November 2010

The second live show was part of ProSieben's Red Nose Day campaign. The first single is called "No Time for Sleeping".

Draw	Artist	Song (original artists)	Result
1	Julia	"Black Velvet" (Alannah Myles)	Safe
2	Yonca	"Time After Time" (Cyndi Lauper)	Safe
3	Esra	"Everybody Hurts" (R.E.M.)	Safe
4	Diba	"Broken-Hearted Girl" (Beyoncé Knowles)	Safe
5	Jenny	"Don't Speak" (No Doubt)	Eliminated
6	Katrin	"When I Look at You" (Miley Cyrus)	Safe
7	Pascaline	"Hedonism (Just Because You Feel Good)" (Skunk Anansie)	Safe
8	Meike	"Un-Break My Heart" (Toni Braxton)	Band member

=== Episode 16: Liveshow III ===
First Aired: 2 December 2010

Draw	Artist	Song (original artists)	Result
1	Pascaline	"Hello (Follow Your Own Star)" (Christina Aguilera)	Safe
2	Katrin	"Run" (Snow Patrol)	Safe
3	Diba	"Waiting for Tonight" (Jennifer Lopez)	Eliminated
4	Esra	"I'm like a Bird" (Nelly Furtado)	Safe
5	Yonca	"When the Rain Begins to Fall" (Jermaine Jackson & Pia Zadora)	Safe
6	Julia	"(Everything I Do) I Do It for You" (Bryan Adams)	Band member

=== Episode 17: Liveshow IV ===
First Aired: 9 December 2010

Round 1
Draw	Artist	Song (original artists)	Result
1	Yonca	"Waka Waka (This Time for Africa)" (Shakira)	Eliminated
2	Pascaline	"Bed of Roses" (Bon Jovi)	Safe
3	Esra	"If I Were a Boy" (Beyoncé)	Safe
4	Katrin	"One Moment in Time" (Whitney Houston)	Safe

Round 2
Draw	Artist	Song (original artists)	Result
1	Katrin	"I Want to Know What Love Is" (Mariah Carey)	Safe
2	Esra	"Angels" (Robbie Williams)	Safe
3	Pascaline	"Empire State of Mind (Part II) Broken Down" (Alicia Keys)	Eliminated

Round 3
Draw	Artist	Song (original artists)	Result
1	LaViVe feat. Esra	"No Time for Sleeping" (LaViVe)	Eliminated
2	LaViVe feat. Katrin	"No Time for Sleeping" (LaViVe)	band member

== Elimination's call-out order ==
Judges' Call-Out Order
Order	Episodes														
Order	5	6	7	8	9	10	11	12	13	14	15	16	17		
1	Betty	Diba	Meike	Sarah	Pascaline	Jessica	Sarah	Katrin	Pascaline	Meike	Julia	Katrin	Katrin	Katrin	Katrin
2	Gloria	Katrin	Diba	Jenny	Isabelle	Meike	Yonca	Diba	Diba	Diba	Yonca	Pascaline	Esra	Esra	Esra
3	Sarah	Angel-Ann	Maria	Meike	Meike	Ines	Pascaline	Yonca	Jenny	Esra	Katrin	Yonca	Pascaline	Pascaline	
4	Claudia	Sonni	Sash	Julia	Sarah	Katrin	Diba	Julia	Yonca	Pascaline	Diba	Diba	Yonca		
5	Angel-Ann	Claudia	Katrin	Katrin	Ines	Pascaline	Claudia	Claudia	Julia	Sarah	Esra	Esra			
6	Maria	Sarah	Esra	Yonca	Katrin	Isabelle	Esra	Meike	Sarah	Julia	Jenny	Julia			
7	Pascaline	Jessica	Julia	Claudia	Julia	Esra	Ines	Pascaline	Claudia	Katrin	Pascaline				
8	Katrin	Isabelle	Isabelle	Sonni	Sonni	Claudia	Jenny	Ines	Meike	Jenny	Meike				
9	Jessica	Yonca	Jenny	Ines	Rosalie	Jenny	Katrin	Sarah	Esra	Yonca					
10	Julia	Jasmin	Pascaline	Angel-Ann	Esra	Julia	Meike	Jenny	Katrin	Claudia					
11	Jasmin	Ines	Sarah	Isabelle	Jessica	Diba	Julia	Esra	Ines						
12	Diba	Rosalie	Angel-Ann	Diba	Yonca	Sarah	Isabelle								
13	Jenny	Sash	Sonni	Rosalie	Jenny	Sonni									
14	Isabelle	Maria	Jessica	Jessica	Diba	Yonca									
15	Meike	Esra	Claudia	Esra	Claudia										
16	Denise	Pascaline	Yonca	Pascaline											
17	Chantal	Meike	Rosalie	Sash											
18	Dilara	Jenny	Ines												
19	Ines	Julia													
20	Milka	Milka													
21	Rosalie														
22	Esra														
23	Sash														
24	Yonca														
25	Sonni														

The contestant was eliminated
The contestant was band-leader
The contestant was the best band-leader and was therefore safe from elimination
The contestant was band-leader and was eliminated
The contestant quit the competition
The contestant won the competition

== Guest performances ==
In addition, songs are played during the episodes to promote an artist, single, album, or the show itself. Included is a list of those songs with their Media Control Top 100 reactions.

Week	Performer(s)	Title	Top 100 Reaction	Notes
Casting I	Marit Larsen	"Don't Save Me"	56 (+18)	performed with contestants
Casting II	Monrose	"Like a Lady"	45 (+5)	performed with contestants
Casting III	Aura Dione	"Song for Sophie (I Hope She Flies)"	66 (+3)	performed with contestants
Casting IV	Gabriella Cilmi	"On a Mission"	failed to re-enter	performed with contestants
Talent Check	Amy Macdonald	"This Pretty Face"	60 (debut)	performance
Workshop I	Ne-Yo	"Beautiful Monster"	15 (+5)	performance
Workshop II	Kim Wilde	"Lights Down Low"	64 (-12)	performance
Workshop III	Culcha Candela	"Hamma!" / "Monsta"	68 (re-enter) / 82 (re-enter)	performance
Live Show I	Popstars Top 10 feat. Gary Baker	"I Swear"	69 (debut)	performed with contestants
Live Show I	Robbie Williams & Gary Barlow	"Shame"	21 (+11)	performance
Live Show I	Revolverheld & Marta Jandová	"Halt dich an mir fest"	8 (debut)	performance
Live Show II	Paul Potts	"Nessun dorma"	failed to re-enter	performance
Live Show II	James Blunt feat. Sarah, Julia, Diba, Esra & Yonca	"You're Beautiful"	failed to re-enter	performed with contestants
Live Show II	Paul Potts feat. Sarah, Pascaline, Jenny, Meike & Katrin	"What a Wonderful World"	failed to enter	performed with contestants
Live Show II	James Blunt	"Stay the Night"	19 (-3)	performance
Live Show II	Graziella Schazad	"Take On Me"	failed to enter	performance
Live Show III	Medina	"Addiction" / "You and I"	TBA / TBA	performance
Live Show III	Duffy feat. Katrin, Pascaline & Diba	"Mercy"	TBA	performed with contestants
Live Show III	Duffy feat. Yonca, Esra & Julia	"Warwick Avenue"	TBA	performed with contestants
Live Show III	Duffy	"Well, Well, Well"	TBA	performance
Live Show IV	Nena & Peter Heppner	"Im Haus der drei Sonnen"	TBA	performance
Live Show IV	Madcon feat. Pascaline, Esra & Katrin	"Beggin'"	TBA	performed with contestants
Live Show IV	Madcon	"Glow" / "Freaky Like Me"	TBA	performance
Live Show IV	Monrose	"Breathe You in"	TBA	performance
Live Show IV	Ich + Ich	"Hilf Mir"	TBA	performance
Live Show IV	LaViVe	"No Time for Sleeping"	13 (debut)	winners' single

== Television ratings ==
=== Germany ===
Episode	from 3 years		14-to-49-year-old	
Episode	Viewers (in millions)	Share (in %)	Viewers (in millions)	Share (in %)
1	2,31	8.6	1,78	16.9
2	2,40	8.6	1,93	17.0
3	2,23	7.8	1,80	15.0
4	2,33	8.0	1,87	15.6
5	2,37	8.0	1,94	15.9
6	2,16	7.5	1,78	14.7
7	2,23	7.5	1,81	14.4
8	1,96	6.6	1,55	12.7
9	2,41	7.9	1,87	15.2
10	2,76	8.8	2,07	16.3
11	2,43	7.7	1,83	14.8
12	2,52	8.1	1,94	15.6
13	2,30	7.7	1,78	14.7
14	2,22	7.3	1,76	14.0
15	2,45	8.4	1,95	16.2
16	2,18	7.4	1,70	14.0
17	2,13	7.7	1,63	14.5
Season	2,32	7.9	1,82	15.1
