= LaViVe =

German girl group

LaVive
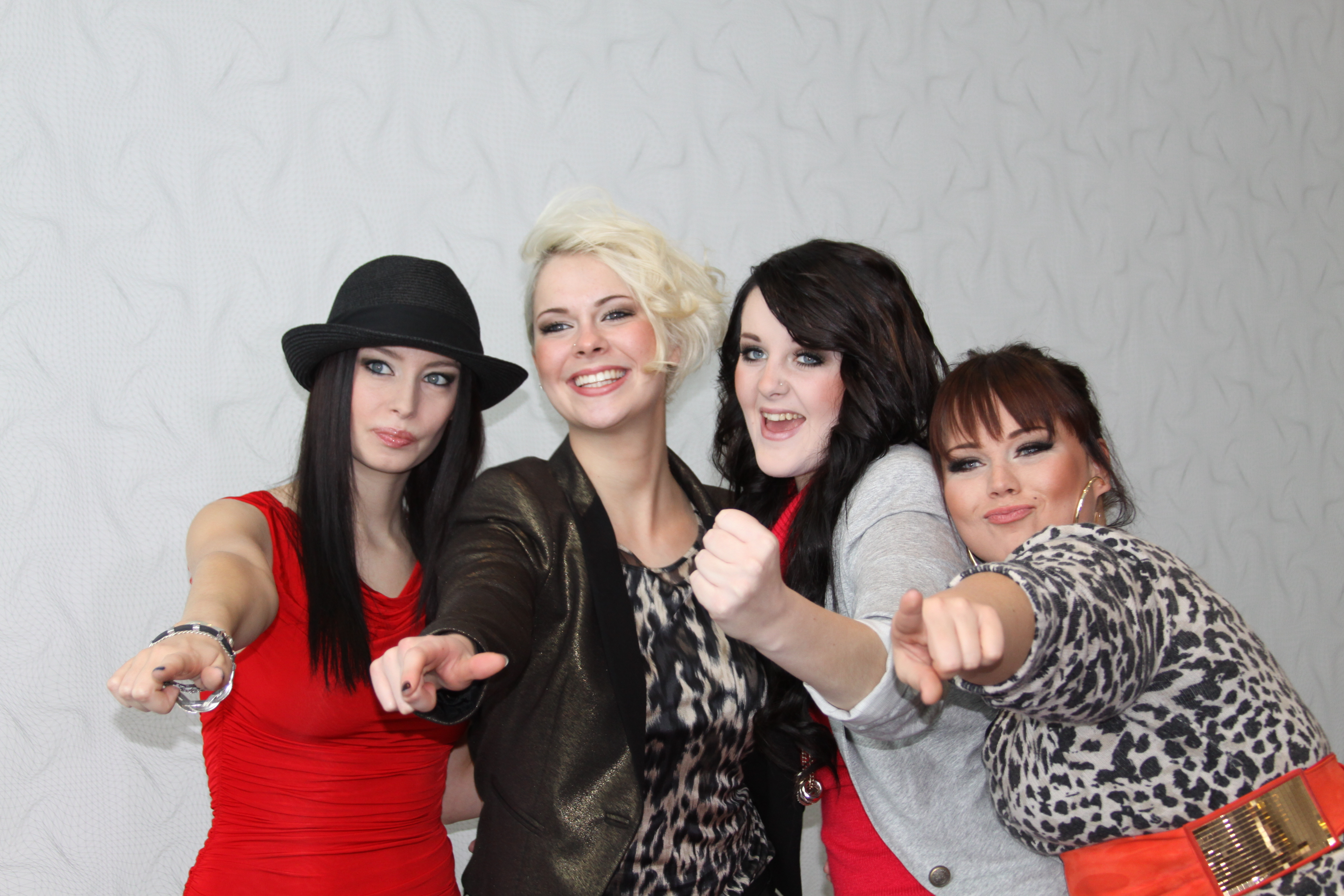
- LaViVe in 2010 (L-R: Meike Ehnert, Katrin Mehlberg, Julia Köster, Sarah Rensing)

Background information
- Origin: Germany
- Genres: Pop, dance-pop, electro house, hip house
- Years active: 2010–2011
- Labels: Starwatch/Warner
- Past members: Meike Ehnert; Julia Köster; Katrin Mehlberg; Sarah Rensing

LaVive were a German girl group consisting of Meike Ehnert, Sarah Rensing, Julia Köster and Katrin Mehlberg that was formed on the television show Popstars: Girls forever. Their debut album No Sleep was released in December 2010.

The single "I Swear" was released in November 2010 featuring the final eleven contestants of Popstars: Girls forever, and the single "No Time for Sleeping" was released in December 2010. After LaViVe's record-deal with record label Starwatch/Warner expired in March 2011, Warner did not renew it, which led to the group's disbandment.

== Discography ==
=== Studio albums ===
Year	Title	Chart positions		
Year	Title	GER	AUT	SWI
2010	No Sleep: Released: 17 December 2010 (Germany); Label: Starwatch/Warner; Formats: CD, Digital Download	44	42	83

=== Singles ===
Year	Single	Chart positions			Album
Year	Single	GER	AUT	SWI	Album
2010	"I Swear"	69	—	—	No Sleep
2010	"No Time for Sleeping"	13	12	28	No Sleep

== See also ==
- Popstars: Girls forever
- Monrose
- Queensberry
- No Angels
- Girl group
- Bratz
