= I Can Love You Like That =

1995 song

Single by John Michael Montgomery

from the album John Michael Montgomery
- Released: February 27, 1995
- Genre: Country
- Length: 3:55
- Label: Atlantic
- Songwriters: Steve Diamond; Maribeth Derry; Jennifer Kimball
- Producer: Scott Hendricks

John Michael Montgomery singles chronology
"If You've Got Love" (1994)	"I Can Love You Like That" (1995)	"Sold (The Grundy County Auction Incident)" (1995)

"I Can Love You Like That" is a song written by Steve Diamond, Jennifer Kimball and Maribeth Derry, and recorded by American country music singer John Michael Montgomery. It was released in February 1995 by Atlantic Records as the first single from his self-titled CD (1995). The song reached the top of the US Billboard Hot Country Singles & Tracks (now Hot Country Songs) chart.

== Music video ==
The accompanying music video for "I Can Love You Like That" was directed by Marc Ball and premiered in early 1995. It features a wedding, with John Michael Montgomery singing.

== Chart performance ==
The song debuted at number 59 on the US Billboard Hot Country Singles & Tracks chart dated March 4, 1995. It charted for twenty weeks and went to Number One on the chart dated April 22, 1995, and stayed there for one week before being replaced by Brooks & Dunn's "Little Miss Honky Tonk" the next week. However, it did go back to Number One on the chart dated May 6, 1995, where it stayed for two more weeks.

== Charts ==
=== Weekly charts ===
Chart (1995)	Peak position
Canada Country Singles (RPM)	3
US Hot Country Songs (Billboard)	1

=== Year-end charts ===
Chart (1995)	Position
Canada Country Tracks (RPM)	79
US Country Songs (Billboard)	5

== All-4-One version ==
"I Can Love You Like That"

Single by All-4-One

from the album And the Music Speaks
- B-side: "All-4-1"
- Released: June 1995
- Length: 4:23
- Label: Atlantic; Blitzz
- Songwriters: Steve Diamond; Maribeth Derry; Jennifer Kimball
- Producer: David Foster

All-4-One singles chronology
"Yo te voy a querer" (1994)	"I Can Love You Like That" (1995)	"Yo te voy a querer" (re-release) (1995)

Music video
- "I Can Love You Like That" on YouTube

Two months after Montgomery's version reached number one, American male R&B and pop group All-4-One released their version of "I Can Love You Like That" on Atlantic and Blitzz Records, and it reached a peak of number five on the US Billboard Hot 100 in 1995. It was produced by David Foster, selling 600,000 copies domestically and being certified gold by the Recording Industry Association of America (RIAA). Despite a live performance on the BBC's long-running music programme Top of the Pops, it only peaked at number 33 on the UK Singles Chart, becoming the band's last top-40 entry there.

=== Critical reception ===
Steve Baltin from Cash Box wrote, "All-4-One had one of the biggest hits of last year with the chart-topping 'I Swear'. The first single from their forthcoming And the Music Speaks album continues the remarkably middle-of-the-road sound they put forth last year. As a result, similar chart success is likely. Though appeal of the same magnitude might be harder to achieve. Simple and Wonder Bread white, 'I Can Love You Like That' is a huge ballad." Music & Media named it a "sugary ballad". Leesa Daniels from Smash Hits said, "If you haven't got a boy/girlfriend then this might well be the tune you'd like sung to you. It's all gooey and sickly in a marshmellowy type way".

=== Track listing ===
- CD single – Europe (1995)
1. "I Can Love You Like That" (edit) – 4:10
2. "All-4-1" – 5:24
3. "I Can Love You Like That" (LP version) – 4:23

=== Charts ===
==== Weekly charts ====
Chart (1995–1996)	Peak position
Australia (ARIA)	12
Brazil (UPI)	4
Canada Top Singles (RPM)	4
Canada Adult Contemporary (RPM)	1
Europe (Eurochart Hot 100)	97
Europe (European AC Radio)	6
Europe (European Dance Radio)	14
Europe (European Hit Radio)	6
France Airplay (SNEP)	22
Germany (GfK)	67
Netherlands Airplay (Music & Media)	6
Israel (Israeli Singles Chart)	36
Italy Airplay (Music & Media)	12
Netherlands (Dutch Top 40 Tipparade)	16
Netherlands (Single Top 100)	33
New Zealand (Recorded Music NZ)	2
Scottish Singles Sales (Official Charts)	65
Spain Airplay (Top 40 Radio)	17
UK Singles (Official Charts)	33
UK Airplay (Music Week)	42
UK Hip Hop/R&B (Official Charts)	7
US Billboard Hot 100	5
US Adult Contemporary (Billboard)	2
US Hot R&B Singles (Billboard)	40
US Cash Box Top 100	2
Zimbabwe (ZIMA)	1

==== Year-end charts ====
Chart (1995)	Position
Canada Top Singles (RPM)	47
Canada Adult Contemporary (RPM)	36
Europe (European AC Radio)	19
Europe (European Dance Radio)	25
New Zealand (RIANZ)	25
US Billboard Hot 100	15
US Adult Contemporary (Billboard)	12
US Cash Box Top 100	7

=== Certifications ===
Region	Certification	Certified units/sales
Australia (ARIA)	Gold	35,000^{^}
New Zealand (RMNZ)	Gold	15,000^{‡}
United States (RIAA)	Gold	500,000^{^}
^{^} Shipments figures based on certification alone.^{‡} Sales+streaming figures based on certification alone.

=== Release history ===
Region	Date	Format(s)	Label(s)	Ref.
United States	June 1995	7-inch vinyl; CD; cassette	Atlantic; Blitzz	
Australia	June 19, 1995	CD; cassette	Atlantic; Blitzz	
United Kingdom	July 3, 1995	CD; cassette	Atlantic; Blitzz	
Japan	July 10, 1995	CD	Atlantic	
