= No Regrets (All-4-One album) =

Studio album by All-4-One
- Released: September 15, 2009
- Recorded: 2008–2009
- Genre: R&B
- Label: Peak

All-4-One chronology
Split Personality (2004)	No Regrets (2009)	Twenty+ (2015)

Professional ratings
Review scores
Source	Rating
About.com	3/5 stars
AllMusic	2.5/5 stars

No Regrets is the seventh studio album by American R&B group All-4-One. It was released on September 15, 2009 through Peak Records.

The first single from the album was "My Child", followed by "When I Needed an Angel", of which a portion of the proceeds were donated to Donate Life America.

The album was written by the group and produced by Jamie Jones' production company, The Heavyweights. The song "You Don't Know Nothin'" is a cover of the song by the group For Real, who All-4-One toured with during the 1990s. All-4-One had always enjoyed singing the song with the group and decided to make it the a cappella track for this album. It includes a cover of Westlife's "If Your Heart's Not in It", included on their World of Our Own album (2001).

== Track listing ==
1. "Key to Your Heart" (Jamie Jones, Solomon Ridge Jr., G'harah "PK" Degeddingseze) – 4:01
2. "Ol' Fashion Lovin'" (Jamie Jones, Jack Kugell, Jason Pennock, Maria Lawson) – 3:27
3. "Regret" (Jamie Jones, Jason Pennock, David Arthur Garcia) – 3:33
4. "If Your Heart's Not in It" (Andrew Frampton, Steve Kipner) – 4:02
5. "Go" (Jamie Jones, Delious Kennedy) – 3:50
6. "If Sorry Never Comes" (Jamie Jones, Jason Pennock, Delious Kennedy, D'Myreo Mitchell) – 3:10
7. "Perfect" (Jamie Jones, Jason Pennock, Delious Kennedy, Eric Jackson) – 3:58
8. "I Luv That Girl" (Jamie Jones, Dajuan Cowan) – 3:41
9. "My Child" (Delious Kennedy, Jamie Jones, Jason Pennock, Jack Kugell, Tommy McCarthy, Keith Eric Martin) – 4:37
10. "The Day Life Began" (Jamie Jones, David Frank, Guy Sebastian) – 3:59
11. "Blowin' Me Up" (Jamie Jones, Delious Kennedy, Jason Pennock) – 3:32
12. "You Don't Know Nothin'" (Hallerin H. Hill, Mervyn Edwin Warren) – 3:35
13. "When I Needed an Angel" (Jamie Jones, Delious Kennedy, Jason Pennock, Jack Kugell) – 3:45
