= Corina (Romanian singer) =

Corina Bud
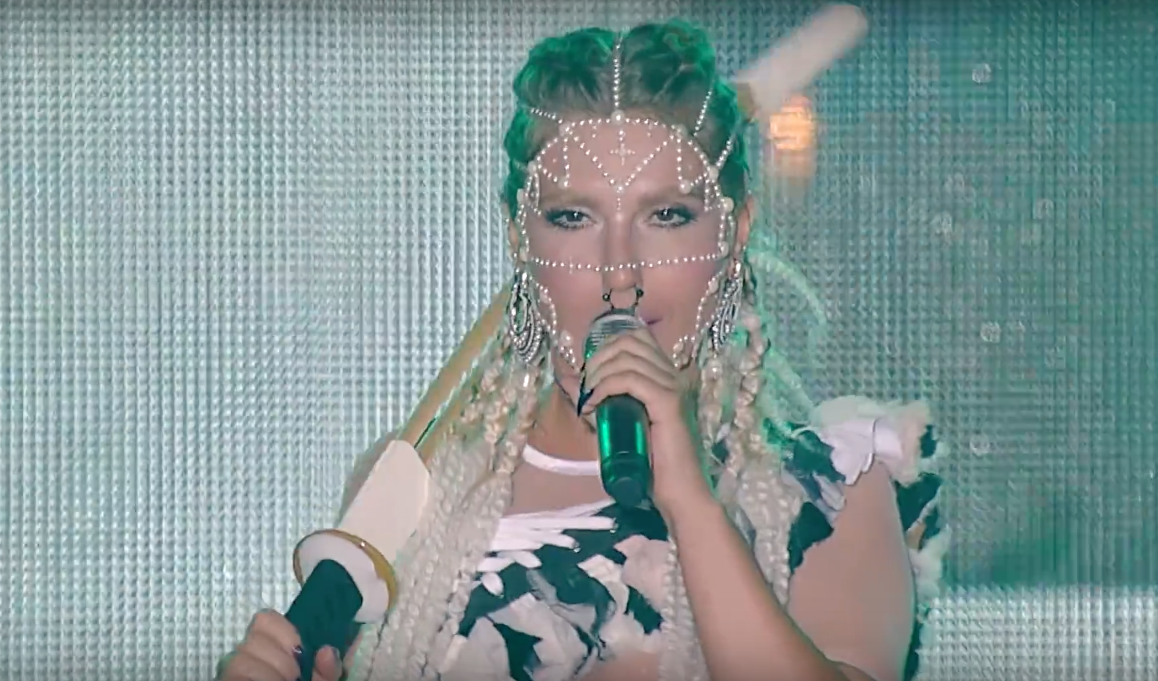
- Corina performing at Music Media Awards in 2015

Background information
- Born: 26 January 1980 (age 46)
- Origin: Satu Mare, Romania
- Genres: Pop, dance, R&B
- Occupations: Singer, composer
- Instrument: Vocals
- Years active: 2003-present
- Labels: Roton (2003–2018), MediaPro Music (2008–2010), Global Records (2022-present)

Corina Bud (Romanian pronunciation: [koˈrina bud]; born January 26, 1980, in Satu Mare), better known as Corina, is a Romanian singer and fashion icon. She debuted in 2004 with the album Noi Doi, produced by Marius Moga. The lead single from the album, also titled "Noi Doi", reached fourth place in the Romanian Top 100.

The second album, named Îmi Place La Tine Tot (2005) produced two great singles, "Îmi Place La Tine Tot" and "Fără Tine", becoming the most broadcast Romanian hits in 2005, giving her the nickname "Corina Hits".

Her third album Face Off represents a significant change in the artist's singing style having dancehall, reggae, R&B, drum ‘n bass, hip hop, house and electro influences, but still remaining a pop/dance album. The album produced two big singles, "Quieres Una Aventura" and "Overdrive". In parallel in discussion with Warner Music, Corina released her fourth album " Gimme Your Love" in July 2008, which received critical acclamation. The album was produced and recorded in Germany, in a Hamburg-based studio, under the supervision of Toni Cottura, with a guest feature from Lumidee on the song "Let Go".

Corina went on to be internationally recognised with single " No Sleepin' " feat JJ (2011), signed to Sony Music France & Bianco Y Negro Spain, the song peaked Top 10 in Poland and Spain, as well as covered by German pop group LaVive, reaching within Top 20 in Germany and Austria, and Top 30 within Switzerland. No Sleepin' was nominated for Best Video Category at the Romanian Music Awards (RMA), additionally performed by the singer, who went home taking the award for Fashion Icon in 2011.

In 2019 the artist was chosen by Disney Channel Romania to perform the main theme for the Romanian dub of the movie Kim Possible.

== Early life ==
Corina was born in Satu Mare, to mother Ileana, a retired baker with a Ukrainian background, and father Vasile, a retired carpenter.

She comes from a family of "Oșeni", a group of people originated from a region known to be one of the most original and picturesque ethno-folklore areas in Romania.

The singer grew up listening to rock and alternative music. Supported by her father, who has a native talent for singing, Corina began discovering her passion for music at the early age of 8, by participating in musical contests and singing in the church choir.

She graduated from Economics High School and The Romanian University of Economic Studies with a degree in Finance, Accounting and Management.

Corina also has a degree in law. At the age of 23, she initially wanted to become a lawyer but decided to pursue her musical career instead.

== Musical career ==
=== 2004 – 2009 ===
Corina debuted in 2004 with the single Noi Doi featuring Pacha Man, produced by Marius Moga, accompanied by a music video and her first interpreted character "Urban Lollita". The song peaked at No.4 on the Romanian Top 100 Charts, giving Corina notoriety and a fanbase across the country. Not long after, she released her debut album, also entitled "Noi Doi".

Her second album "Îmi Place La Tine Tot" marked by single "Fără Tine" and "Îmi Place La Tine Tot" featuring Don Baxter, became the most broadcast Romanian Hits in 2005, giving her the nickname "Corina Hits" for choosing great records.

Several years after the communist regime, cultural openness was still something to be explored by artists across Romania. Corina distinguished herself by delving and pushing her imaginative limits in her concept themed videos. In 2006 she released "Overdrive" encapsulating Otaku fashion.

"The character I wanted to live with would reinterpret the manga culture, a cumulus of details (eyes with deep and deep pupils, restless emotions, violence, innocence, and alienation). My team supported this idea and I was not afraid to talk to the world about a community that borrows and lives a global anime lifestyle."

Late 2006, while frequenting the offices of Warner Music Germany, she met Fun Factory producer, Toni Cottura and they instantly became well-suited. The two collaborated on single "Quieres Una Aventura" followed by the release of her third album "Face Off" taking her fans through a journey of parkour, yamanba girls & dance battles.

Corina's fourth album, "Gimme Your Love" was fully produced by Toni, and marked by a feature from Lumidee on "Let Go".

=== 2010–2019 ===
The singer put her career on hold while giving birth to her son, Robin, but returned in 2011 with single "No Sleepin'" feat JJ (also known as Geneva), produced by HaHaHa Production. The single gained international success shortly after it was signed to Sony Music France and Bianco Y Negro, Spain, peaking within Top 20 in Germany and Austria, and Top 30 within Switzerland. It was covered by German Popstars winner group LaViVe. They released it as their debut single but only reached number thirteen on the German Singles Chart. On the Romanian Top 100, the original was a hit, reaching number eight on 29 May 2011.

Corina performed the song at Los 40 Pricipales Costa Pop, Spain & Hity na Czasie, Poland. She received the award for Fashion Icon at the Romanian Music Awards (RMA), while also being nominated for Best Video & Best Female Artist.

She released a reggae fusion/Europop song called "A Ta" (2012) the song quickly became a massive radio hit, reaching number three on the Romanian Airplay 100 on 30 September 2012 and becoming Corina's most successful single on the chart. The follow-up "Pernele Moi" (2013), a collaboration with Romanian reggae artist Pacha Man, reached similar success as it also peaked at number three on the Romanian Airplay 100.

The singer reunited with Marius Moga in 2013 on "Miss boboc" (translated as "Prom Queen") feat Junior High. In 2014, she released the singles "Autobronzant" and "Nimeni Altcineva" landing at No. 16 and 17 on the Romanian charts. She followed with a national campaign for the Ice Cream brand Corso, which is the single "Of Corso" with Romanian artist Connect-R.

In 2015, the artist released another distinguishing single in her career, "Fete Din Balcani" feat Skizzo Skills and Mira, produced by Vanotek, which quickly gained traction with 80 million views on YouTube. She performed the song at the Media Music Awards in 2015, followed by numerous live radio performances. She continued with releasing a more personal single "Neprevăzut", which remained in the Top Trending Songs chart for the first four weeks upon its release.

== Chart positions ==
Song	Year	Peak	
Song	Year	ROM Airplay	POL TV Airplay
"Noi doi" (feat. Pacha Man & Marius Moga)	2004	4	–
"Îmi place la tine tot" (feat. Don Baxter & Smiley)	2005	10	–
"Fără tine"	2005	5	–
"Let Go" (feat. Lumidee)	2009	–	–
"Latino Caffe" (feat. Dony)	2010	–	–
"No Sleepin' " (feat. JJ)	2011	8	4
"Munky Funky"	2012	23	–
"A ta"	2012	3	–
"Pernele moi" (feat. Pacha Man)	2013	3	–
"Roata se întoarce"	2013	60	–
"Miss Boboc" (feat. Junior High)	2013	39	–
"Of corso" (feat. Connect-R)	2014	60	–
"Autobronzant"	2014	16	–
"Nimeni altcineva" (feat. Dorian Popa)	2014	17	–
"Fete din Balcani" (feat. Mira & Skizzo Skillz)	2015	–	–
"Neprevăzut"	2016	–	–
"Ceva nou" (feat. Matteo)	2016	–	–
