= Ms Grace =

Song by The Tymes
- B-side: "The Crutch"
- Songwriters: John Hall; Johanna Hall
- Producer: Billy Jackson

Official audio
- "Ms Grace" on YouTube

"Ms Grace" is a popular single by The Tymes, released in 1974. The song was written by John Hall and Johanna Hall, and produced by Billy Jackson.

== Background ==
"Ms Grace" was The Tymes' sole number one in the UK singles chart, spending a single week at the top in January 1975. It fared less well in the US, where it peaked at No. 91 on the Billboard Hot 100 singles chart and No. 75 on the Hot Soul Singles chart. Despite its low US peak, it was a local hit within Carolina Beach Music, where it became a standard.

== Legacy ==
According to Night Club & Bar magazine (vol. 5 issue, 1989), "Ms Grace" is number 2 in the top ten all-time beach songs list.

== Charts ==
Chart (1974–1975)	Peak position
Australia (Kent Music Report)	59
United Kingdom (Official Charts Company)	1
United States (Billboard Hot 100)	91
US Hot Soul Singles (Billboard)	75
