= No Sleepin' =

2010 song by Corina featuring JJ

Single by Corina featuring JJ
- Released: 25 October 2010
- Genre: Dance
- Length: 3:31
- Label: Blanco y Negro; Ego; Roton
- Songwriters: Andrei Maria; Corina Ciorbă; Joanna Oegar
- Producers: Maria; Bogdan Albulescu; Ciorbă; Șerban Cazan

Corina singles chronology
"Latino Caffe" (2010)	"No Sleepin'" (2010)	"Munky Funky" (2012)

"No Sleepin'" is a song recorded by Romanian singer Corina and Romanian rapper JJ, released on 25 October 2010. It was written by Andrei Maria, Corina and JJ, and produced by Maria, Bogdan Albulescu, Corina and Șerban Cazan. "No Sleepin'" marked the singer's return to the music industry after a hiatus. Musically, it is a synthpop-influenced uptempo dance song featuring a piano and a clink sound in its instrumentation; its lyrics revolve around partying at night and not sleeping.

A music critic from Romanian website Divercity Cafe was positive towards the track, predicting its commercial success, while another compared it to the works of DJ BoBo. To accompany "No Sleepin'", a music video was premiered on 13 January 2011. Filmed by Marian Dinescu at the Casa Scriitorilor in Bucharest, Romania, it portrays Corina impersonating a female punk burlesque character. The visual received a nomination in the Best Video category at the 2011 Romanian Music Awards. Further promoted by a live performance at the aforementioned event, the track peaked within the top ten in Romania and on the Polish television airplay chart, as well as within the top 60 in Russia.

After being sent a demo version of "No Sleepin'", German girl group LaViVe recorded a cover version of the song for their debut studio album No Sleep (2010). Retitled into "No Time for Sleeping", it was released as a CD single in Germany on 10 December 2010 by Starwatch Music. While music critics gave mixed reviews of their rendition, it peaked within the 20 in Germany and Austria, and within the top 30 in Switzerland. "No Time for Sleeping" was aided by the release of a music video in early December 2010, as well as by a supporting tour in the aforementioned countries.

== Background and composition ==
"No Sleepin'"
A 25-second sample of "No Sleepin'", a synthpop-influenced uptempo dance song featuring a piano and a clink sound in its instrumentation.

"No Sleepin'" features collaborative rap vocals from Romanian rapper JJ. It was written by Andrei Maria, Corina and JJ, and produced by Maria, Bogdan Albulescu, Corina and Șerban Cazan. The song was produced at the HaHaHa Production in Bucharest. Regarding the sessions, the singer stated: "'No Sleepin' is my re-invented music after sleepless nights spent in the studio, where I mocked the mad enthusiasm of the people at HaHaHa Production." Released on 25 October 2010, the track marked Corina's return to the music industry after taking a nearly two-year hiatus to raise her child.

Musically, "No Sleepin'" is a synthpop-influenced uptempo dance song featuring a "discreet" piano and a "clink" sound in its instrumentation. The track's lyrics revolve around partying at night and undersleeping; lines include: "I'm feeling naughty, I'm feeling good, I'm feeling pretty/Ain't got no plans, Ain't got no job, Ain't got no meanin'". A writer of Romanian website Divercity Cafe noted the playful vibe of the song, while B.Z. compared it to the work of DJ BoBo.

== Music video and promotion ==
A screenshot of the music video, showing Corina dancing to the song in front of red numbers. She portrays a female punk burlesque character.

An accompanying music video for "No Sleepin'" premiered exclusively on Libertatea and Romanian website Monden.info on 13 January 2011. It was subsequently uploaded onto Roton's official YouTube channel one day later, preceded by the release of a teaser on 20 December 2010. The high-budget clip was filmed on 29 November 2010 by Marian Dinescu at the Casa Scriitorilor in Bucharest, Romania, with Dana Budeanu hired as a stylist.

According to Corina, she portrays a "fresh, rebellious, slightly eccentric, sexy and delicate-incisive" female punk burlesque character in the music video. The visual begins with the singer kissing a disco ball in form of a human head in a room with fellow people involved in similar activities. After one of them plays a phonograph record, the song starts and Corina is shown dancing accompanied by male background dancers. Following this, she descends to a club from its ceiling wrapped in a white cloth. After a cameo appearance from JJ, the video continues in a similar way and ends with a reel-to-reel audio tape recording running a reel. Scenes interspersed during the clip's main plot include Corina dancing in front of red numbers, poledancing and lying on the ground while water drops on her. The visual was nominated for Best Video at the 2011 Romanian Music Awards, where Corina performed "No Sleepin'" live.

== Track listing ==
- Spanish digital download
1. "No Sleepin'" (feat. JJ) – 3:31
2. "No Sleepin'" (feat. JJ) [Odd Remix Extended] – 5:50
3. "No Sleepin'" (feat. JJ) [Odd Remix Radio Edit] – 3:50
- Italian enhanced CD
1. "No Sleepin'" (feat. JJ) [Radio Edit] – 3:33
2. "No Sleepin'" (feat. JJ) [Odd Remix Radio Edit] – 3:52
3. "No Sleepin'" (feat. JJ) [Odd Remix Extended] – 5:51
4. "No Sleepin'" (feat. JJ) [Music video] – 4:26
- Romanian promotional CD single
1. "No Sleepin'" (feat. JJ) [Radio Edit] – 3:31
2. "No Sleepin'" (feat. JJ) [Video Edit] – 3:33
3. "No Sleepin'" (feat. JJ) [Odd Remix Extended] – 5:29
4. "No Sleepin'" (feat. JJ) [Odd Remix Radio Edit] – 3:50
5. "No Sleepin'" (feat. JJ) [Mădălin Sichitu Remix] – 5:29
6. "No Sleepin'" (feat. JJ) [Mădălin Sichitu Remix Edit] – 3:35
7. "Crazy Love" (Radio Edit) – 3:41
8. "Crazy Love" (Extended) – 5:40

== Charts ==
Chart (2011)	Peak position
Poland (Polish TV Airplay Chart)	4
Romania (Romanian Top 100)	8
Russia (Tophit)	59

== Release history ==
Region	Date	Format	Label
Romania	25 October 2010	—N/a	—N/a
Spain	15 February 2011	Digital download	Blanco y Negro
Italy	11 April 2011	Enhanced CD	Ego
Romania	N/A 2011	Promotional CD single	Roton

== LaViVe version ==
"No Time for Sleeping"

Single by LaViVe

from the album No Sleep
- Released: 10 December 2010
- Genre: Dance
- Length: 3:35
- Label: Starwatch
- Songwriters: Maria; Ciorbă; Oegar
- Producers: Maria; Albulescu; Ciorbă; Cazan

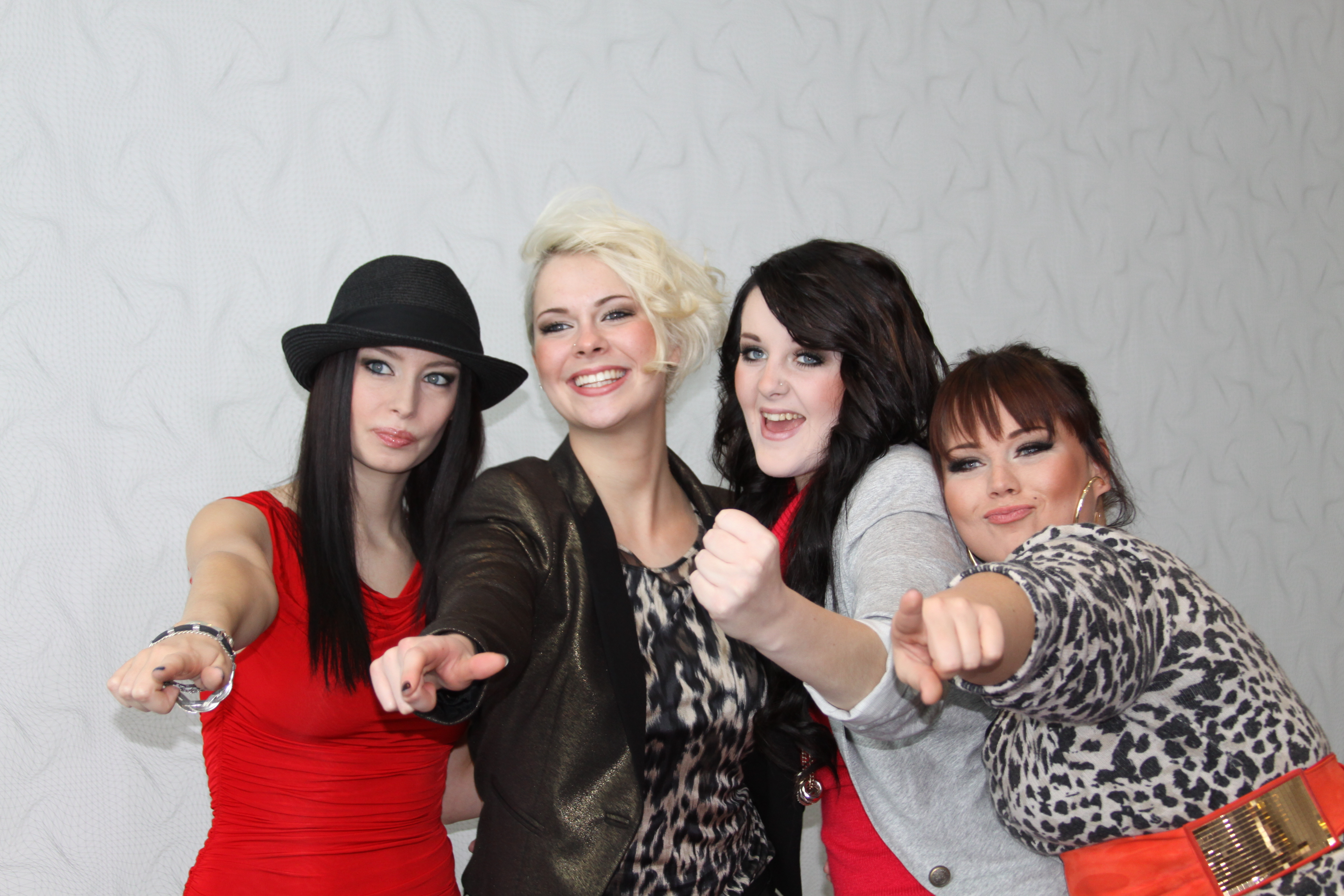
LaViVe members (left to right) Meike Ehnert, Katrin Mehlberg, Julia Köster and Sarah Rensing.

=== Background and release ===
German girl group LaViVe was formed on the ninth installment of the German adaption of the international television talent show Popstars in 2010. The group consists of Meike Ehnert, Sarah Rensing, Julia Köster and Katrin Mehlberg. LaViVe recorded a cover of "No Sleepin'" after a demo version of the song was handed to their management by a Romanian producing team. Their rendition, titled "No Time for Sleeping", was released on a CD single in Germany on 10 December 2010 by Starwatch Music, as licensed by Corina's label. The CD single additionally contains versions of the song recorded by three fellow eliminated contestants on that year's Popstars.

=== Reception ===
"No Time for Sleeping" received mixed reviews from music critics upon its release. German singer Thomas M. Stein praised the commercial appeal of the song. An editor of German website Promicabana applauded the song and its rap part, although foreseeing the commercial failure of the track. Similarly, B.Z. criticized "No Time for Sleeping" as repetitive and denied its success.

Commercially, the song — aided by a tour in German-speaking Europe — fared moderately. In Germany, the song entered and peaked at number 13 on the Official German Charts, lasting for eight weeks. Digitally, it was the 14th most-downloaded song in the nation in the week ending 22 December 2010. "No Time for Sleeping" further peaked at numbers 12 and 28 in Austria and Switzerland, remaining for five and one weeks, respectively.

=== Music video ===
An accompanying music video for "No Time for Sleeping" premiered during the night of 9 December 2010, with a snippet shown earlier that day during the Popstars finale to choose the final member for LaViVe. During the visual, the group is shown dancing in front of a wall that constantly changes its colors or residing in a club. It was received with mixed reviews from music critics. An editor of Promiflash praised the visual's playful vibe and pointed out the members' professionality. Conversely, a writer on website Promicabana criticized the video as "trash" and unspectacular, further noting the members' peculiar dance movements. In late December 2010, an alternative version of the clip featuring eliminated Popstars candidate Esra Ünvers as part of LaVive was leaked onto the internet, prompting observers to question the show's credibility.

=== Track listing ===
- German CD single
1. "No Time for Sleeping" (LaViVe/Esra) – 3:35
2. "No Time for Sleeping" – 3:35
3. "No Time for Sleeping" (LaViVe/Pascaline) – 3:35
4. "No Time for Sleeping" (LaViVe/Yonca) – 3:34
- French digital download
1. "No Time for Sleeping" – 3:37

=== Charts ===
Chart (2010)	Peak position
Austria (Ö3 Austria Top 40)	12
Germany (Official German Charts)	13
Germany Digital Songs (GfK Entertainment)	14
Switzerland (Schweizer Hitparade)	28

=== Release history ===
Region	Date	Format	Label
Germany	10 December 2010	CD single	Starwatch
France	24 March 2011	Digital download	Starwatch
