= So Much Love =

So Much Love may refer to:

- "So Much Love" (Ben E. King song), 1966, covered by many other artists
- "So Much Love" (Malaika song), 1992
- "So Much Love" (The Rocket Summer song), 2007
- "So Much Love", a song by Rock Goddess from the album Young and Free
- "So Much Love", a song by Faith Hope and Charity, 1970.
- "So Much Love", a song by Depeche Mode on the 2017 album Spirit

== See also ==
- "So Much Love to Give", song by Together (DJ Falcon & Thomas Bangalter)
  - "So Much Love", 2011 song by Fedde Le Grand, greatly sampling on above
  - "So Much Love", 2016, song by Muzzaik & Stadiumx, greatly sampling on above
- "So Much Love for You", 2004 song by Japanese singer Kokia
