= And the Music Speaks =

Studio album by All-4-One
- Released: June 6, 1995
- Recorded: 1994–1995
- Studios: Bravo/AV; Record Plant; The Enterprise; Andora Studios; Dickerson Recording; Cornerstone Studios
- Genres: R&B; pop; soul
- Length: 57:56
- Label: Atlantic/WEA
- Producers: David Foster, DJ Gil, Gary St. Clair, Tim O'Brien, All-4-One

All-4-One chronology
All-4-One (1994)	And the Music Speaks (1995)	An All-4-One Christmas (1995)

Professional ratings
Review scores
Source	Rating
Allmusic	3/5 stars
The Encyclopedia of Popular Music	4/5 stars
Entertainment Weekly	B
Los Angeles Times	2/4 stars

And the Music Speaks is the second album by the American group All-4-One, released on June 6, 1995. It features their Top 5 Pop hit "I Can Love You Like That" which earned the group another Grammy nomination.

== Track listing ==
1. "I Can Love You Like That" - 4:22 (Jennifer Kimball, Maribeth Derry, Steve Diamond)
2. "I'm Sorry" - 4:54 (Delious Kennedy, Gary St. Clair, Jamie Jones, Reggie Green)
3. "These Arms" - 5:01 (Gary Baker, Frank J. Myers)
4. "I'm Your Man" - 5:26 (Bo Watson, Melvin Arthur Gentry)
5. "Giving You My Heart Forever" - 4:56 (Kennedy, St. Clair, Jones, Green)
6. "Could This Be Magic" - 3:47 (Hiram Johnson, Richard Blandon)
7. "Love Is More Than Just Another Four-Letter Word" - 5:08 (James Guillory, Stephanie Alexander)
8. "Think You're the One for Me" - 4:33 (St. Clair, Jones, Green)
9. "Colors of Love" - 5:24 (St. Clair, Carl Wurtz, Randy Camera)
10. "Roll Call" - 5:33 (Kennedy, St. Clair, Jones, Guillory, Tim O'Brien, Alfred Nevarez, Tony Borowiak)
11. "Here for You" - 5:24 (St. Clair, Kennedy)
12. "We Dedicate" - 3:28 (Kennedy, Borowiak, Jones, Nevarez)

== Charts ==
=== Weekly charts ===
Chart (1995–1996)	Peak position
Australian Albums (ARIA)	97
Canada Top Albums/CDs (RPM)	25
German Albums (Offizielle Top 100)	71
Japanese Albums (Oricon)	81
New Zealand Albums (RMNZ)	13
Swiss Albums (Schweizer Hitparade)	49
US Billboard 200	27
Zimbabwean Albums (ZIMA)	4

=== Year-end charts ===
Chart (1995)	Position
US Billboard 200	113

== Certifications ==
Region	Certification	Certified units/sales
Canada (Music Canada)	Gold	50,000^{^}
Thailand	—	30,000
United States (RIAA)	Platinum	1,000,000^{^}
^{^} Shipments figures based on certification alone.

== Singles ==
- "These Arms" - March 19, 1995
- "I Can Love You Like That" - June 6, 1995
- "I'm Your Man" - October 10, 1995
