= All-4-One (All-4-One album) =

Studio album by All-4-One
- Released: April 12, 1994
- Recorded: 1993–1994
- Genres: R&B, pop, soul, new jack swing
- Length: 51:04
- Labels: Atlantic; WEA
- Producers: David Foster; Tim O'Brien; Gary St. Clair

All-4-One chronology
All-4-One (1994)	And the Music Speaks (1995)

Singles from All-4-One
- 1. "So Much in Love" Released: December 20, 1993; 2. "I Swear" Released: April 28, 1994; 3. "Breathless" Released: September 6, 1994; 4. "(She's Got) Skillz" Released: January 24, 1995

Professional ratings
Review scores
Source	Rating
AllMusic	4.5/5 stars
Robert Christgau	1/3 stars
The Encyclopedia of Popular Music	3/5 stars
Entertainment Weekly	B+
Knoxville News Sentinel	3/5 stars
Los Angeles Times	3/4 stars
Smash Hits	3/5

All-4-One is the debut album by All-4-One, released on April 12, 1994. It features the Grammy-award-winning hit single, "I Swear".

== Singles ==
- "So Much in Love" – 1993
- "I Swear" – April 28, 1994
- "Something About You" – 1994
- "Breathless" – September 6, 1994
- "(She's Got) Skillz" – January 24, 1995
- "A Better Man" – 1995

== Track listing ==
No.	Title	Writer(s)	Length
1.	"So Much in Love"	Billy Jackson & the Citizen's Band, George Williams, Roy Stragis	3:32
2.	"Oh Girl"	Gary St. Clair, Jamie Jones	5:45
3.	"A Better Man" (++)	Kenny Nolan	4:04
4.	"I Swear" (*)	Frank J. Myers, Gary Baker	4:19
5.	"Down to the Last Drop" (+)	Kenny Nolan	4:41
6.	"Without You" (**)	Delious Kennedy	5:11
7.	"(She's Got) Skillz"	Gary St. Clair, Tim O'Brien	4:05
8.	"Breathless"	Gary St. Clair, Jamie Jones	4:48
9.	"Something About You"	Gary St. Clair, Jamie Jones	5:06
10.	"The Bomb"	Gary St. Clair, Jamie Jones	4:41
11.	"Here If You're Ready"	Gary St. Clair, Jamie Jones	4:54

The CD released by Atlantic Records had two versions of the song "So Much In Love". The version of "So Much in Love" that is included on the Atlantic Records version, but not on the version released by Blitzz Records, is an extended version with a runtime of 4:18.

== Personnel ==
Adapted from the All-4-One liner notes.

All-4-One

- Jamie Jones, Delious Kennedy, Alfred Nevarez, Tony Borowiak: All Vocals

Artwork

- Julio Estrada: Photography

Production

- Gary St. Clair, Tim O'Brien: Producers
- David Foster: Producer (*)
- DJ Gil: Co-producer (**)
- Tim O'Brien: Executive producer
- Carl Wurlz (+), Rick Kellis (++): Arrangements
- Steve McDonald: Engineer
- Jazz, Scott Campbell, Dave Reitzas: Additional engineering
- Ken Kessie: Mix engineer
- Bravo, Cornerstone, Dickerson Recording, CAN-AM Recorders, Inc., Rumbo Recorders: Recording studios
- Chris Bellman: Mastering (Bernie Grundman Mastering)
- JB: Production coordinator

== Charts ==
=== Weekly charts ===
Weekly chart performance for All-4-One
Chart (1994–95)	Peak position
Australian Albums (ARIA)	12
Austrian Albums (Ö3 Austria)	5
Canada Top Albums/CDs (RPM)	4
Dutch Albums (Album Top 100)	8
European Albums (European Top 100 Albums)	14
German Albums (Offizielle Top 100)	7
Japanese Albums (Oricon)	57
New Zealand Albums (RMNZ)	11
Scottish Albums (Official Charts)	81
Spanish Albums (PROMUSICAE)	18
Swedish Albums (Sverigetopplistan)	24
Swiss Albums (Schweizer Hitparade)	3
UK Albums (Official Charts)	25
US Billboard 200	7
US Top R&B/Hip-Hop Albums (Billboard)	12
Zimbabwean Albums (ZIMA)	6

=== Year-end charts ===
1994 year-end chart performance for All-4-One
Chart (1994)	Position
Australian Albums (ARIA)	95
Canada Top Albums/CDs (RPM)	16
European Albums (European Top 100 Albums)	75
German Albums (Offizielle Top 100)	54
Swiss Albums (Schweizer Hitparade)	20
US Billboard 200	39
US Top R&B/Hip-Hop Albums (Billboard)	53

1995 year-end chart performance for All-4-One
Chart (1995)	Position
US Billboard 200	104

== Certifications ==
Sale certifications for All-4-One
Region	Certification	Certified units/sales
Australia (ARIA)	Gold	35,000^{^}
Canada (Music Canada)	3× Platinum	300,000^{^}
Japan (RIAJ)	Gold	100,000^{^}
New Zealand (RMNZ)	Gold	7,500^{^}
Spain (Promusicae)	Gold	50,000^{^}
Switzerland (IFPI Switzerland)	Gold	25,000^{^}
United States (RIAA)	4× Platinum	4,000,000^{^}
^{^} Shipments figures based on certification alone.
