= So Much in Love (The Tymes album) =

Studio album by The Tymes
- Released: 1963
- Recorded: 1963
- Genre: Doo-wop
- Length: 45:10
- Label: Parkway

The Tymes chronology
| So Much in Love (1963) | The Sound of the Wonderful Tymes (1964) |

Singles from So Much in Love
- 1. "So Much in Love" Released: May 1963; 2. "Wonderful! Wonderful!" Released: August 1963

So Much in Love is the debut studio album by the American doo-wop group the Tymes. It peaked at number 15 on the Billboard Top LPs chart in 1963.

== Track listing ==
Side one

1. "Alone" – 2:33
2. "My Summer Love" – 2:41
3. "Wonderful! Wonderful!" – 3:01
4. "That Old Black Magic" – 2:37
5. "Let's Make Love Tonight" – 2:14
6. "Goodnight My Love" - 2:05

Side two

1. "So Much in Love" – 2:18
2. "You Asked Me to Be Yours" – 2:22
3. "The Twelfth of Never" – 2:30
4. "Way Beyond Today" – 2:25
5. "Summer Day" – 2:40
6. "Autumn Leaves - 2:18

== Charts ==
| Chart (1963) | Peak position |
|---|---|
| US Billboard 200 | 15 |
