= On and On (All-4-One album) =

Studio album by All-4-One
- Released: June 8, 1999
- Label: Atlantic
- Producers: Tim O'Brien, Nile Rodgers, David Foster

All-4-One chronology
An All-4-One Christmas (1995)	On and On (1999)	A41 (2002)

On and On is the fourth album by All-4-One released on June 8, 1999. It was their last album on Atlantic Records. It features the single "I Will Be Right Here" (which hit #24 on the Adult Contemporary chart) as well as "I Cross My Heart" and "Smile Like Mona Lisa."

== Critical reception ==
Professional ratings
Review scores
Source	Rating
AllMusic	2.5/5 stars

Stephen Thomas Erlewine of AllMusic noted that the album maintained All-4-One’s signature blend of polished adult contemporary pop and urban soul, praising its smooth production and appeal to existing fans. However, he criticized the record for offering little stylistic growth after the group’s four-year break between albums, with few standout songs or memorable melodies.

== Track listing ==
1. "Keep It Goin' On" (Nile Rodgers, Garrett Oliver) 4:15
2. "One Summer Night" (Danny Webb) 3:53
3. "I Will Be Right Here" (Diane Warren) 4:24
4. "I Cross My Heart" (featuring Joanne Pennock) (Gary Baker, Frank J. Myers, Tim O'Brien) 3:51
5. "Smile Like Mona Lisa" (Dave DeViller, Sean Hosien) 3:42
6. "No Doubt" (Joanne Pennock, Jason Pennock, Tim O'Brien) 4:10
7. "Whatever You Want" (Ty Lacy, Berny Cosgrove, Kevin Clark) 4:33
8. "Time to Come Home" (Andy Goldmark, Darrell Spencer) 4:02
9. "If You Want Me" (Jamie Jones, Delious Kennedy, Joanne Pennock) 4:32
10. "Somebody 2 Love" (Jamie Jones, Reggie Green) 4:34
11. "Until You Go" (Tony Borowiak, Stayce Roberts, Freddie Tierra, Mace McAdams) 4:27
12. "How To Love Again" (Jamie Jones, Delious Kennedy, Joanne Pennock) 4:54
13. "Secrets" (Jamie Jones, Reggie Green) 5:21
14. "Fear No More" (Marvin Winans) 1:54
15. "One Summer Night" (The Classic Radio Remix) 4:18

== Charts ==
Chart performance for On and On
Chart (1999)	Peak Position
Japanese Albums (Oricon)	90
