= So Much in Love =

1963 single by the Tymes

Single by the Tymes

from the album So Much in Love
- B-side: "Roscoe James McClain"
- Released: May 1963
- Genre: Doo-wop; R&B
- Length: 2:08
- Label: Parkway
- Songwriters: George Williams; Bill Jackson; Roy Straigis

The Tymes singles chronology
"So Much in Love" (1963)	"Wonderful! Wonderful!" (1963)

"So Much in Love" is a song written by George Williams, Billy Jackson, and Roy Straigis (initially under the name John Joseph). It was originally performed by Williams's American soul vocal group the Tymes and was released in the summer of 1963 on Cameo Parkway Records, which produced many pre-Beatles hits of the 1960s such as The Twist. It quickly became The Tymes' first hit single, topping the US Billboard Hot 100 singles chart on August 3, 1963, and remaining there for one week, as well as peaking at No. 4 on the Hot R&B Singles chart.

== Charts ==
Chart (1963)	Peak position
US Billboard Hot 100	1

== All-4-One version ==
"So Much in Love"

Single by All-4-One

from the album All-4-One
- Released: 1993
- Genre: R&B
- Length: 3:31
- Label: Atlantic; Blitzz
- Songwriters: George Williams; Bill Jackson; Roy Straigis
- Producers: Tim O'Brien; Gary St. Clair

All-4-One singles chronology
"So Much in Love" (1993)	"I Swear" (1994)

Music video
- "So Much in Love" on YouTube

American R&B vocal group All-4-One released their cover version of "So Much in Love" in late 1993 via Atlantic and Blitzz as their debut single from their first album, All-4-One (1994). It was produced by Tim O'Brien and Gary St. Clair, and peaked at No. 5 on the US Billboard Hot 100 in early 1994. The single was certified gold by the Recording Industry Association of America (RIAA), selling 600,000 copies. It also reached No. 3 in New Zealand, No. 29 in Belgium and No. 49 in the UK. All-4-One's version is based on a version by a group called AFD whose version was released not long before All-4-One's. A rare music video was also produced to promote the single.

=== Background and composition ===
The group had not previously heard the original song by the Tymes. One of the producers of the cover record, Gary St. Clair, had reached out with the idea of asking for the group to be part of the new recording. "So Much in Love" was also the first work All-4-One had done together; the doo-wop sound had not been stylistically an intention for the group.

=== Critical reception ===
Dave Sholin from the Gavin Report wrote, "Recalling those street corner harmonies of old, this sensational cover of the Tymes' 1963 summer smash caught fire at the tail end of 1993. It's one of those songs that gets on the air and within seconds, captures the audience. Strong request activity." Dennis Hunt from Los Angeles Times named it a "glorious remake" and "a highlight of this excellent album". Alan Jones from Music Week gave it a score of three out of five, saying the group's "close harmony is very similar to that of Boyz II Men. One mix is virtually a capella, the other slips a slow shuffle under the song. It should get enough support to be a mid-charter." Pan-European magazine Music & Media wrote, "The a capella wind of early last year has somewhat calmed down, but could easily be blowing again, if you choose for the right mix without instruments. Of 'Caravan of Love' class." Pete Stanton from Smash Hits also gave it three out of five, noting that "So Much in Love" "is even slower [than 'I Swear'], with not an instrument in sight."

=== Charts ===
==== Weekly charts ====
Chart (1994-1995)	Peak position
Australia (ARIA)	82
Belgium (Ultratop 50 Flanders)	29
Canada Top Singles (RPM)	50
France Airplay (SNEP)	28
Germany (GfK)	56
Israel (Israeli Singles Chart)	37
New Zealand (Recorded Music NZ)	3
UK Singles (Official Charts)	49
US Billboard Hot 100	5
US Hot R&B/Hip-Hop Songs (Billboard)	10
US Rhythmic Airplay (Billboard)	1
US Cash Box Top 100	3
Zimbabwe (ZIMA)	1

==== Year-end charts ====
Chart (1994)	Position
Brazil (Mais Tocadas)	44
New Zealand (RIANZ)	11
US Billboard Hot 100	28
US Hot R&B Singles (Billboard)	66
US Cash Box Top 100	30

=== Certifications ===
Region	Certification	Certified units/sales
United States (RIAA)	Gold	600,000

=== Release history ===
Region	Version	Date	Format(s)	Label(s)	Ref.
United States	Original	1993	Cassette	Atlantic; Blitzz	
United Kingdom	Original	March 21, 1994	7-inch vinyl; CD; cassette	Atlantic; Blitzz	
Australia	Original	April 18, 1994	CD; cassette	Atlantic; Blitzz	
United Kingdom	Remix	November 7, 1994	7-inch vinyl; 12-inch vinyl; CD; cassette	Atlantic	

== Other versions ==
The song has been covered several times:

- In 1965, Lulu - as "So in Love" for her Something to Shout About. Also that year, the Shangri-Las - on their album Leader of the Pack.
- In 1982, Eagles member Timothy B. Schmit contributed his take on the song for the soundtrack to Fast Times at Ridgemont High. The single reached No. 59 on the Hot 100.
- English band the Housemartins - in 1986 as the B-side to their No.1 hit single, "Caravan of Love".
- A 1988 rendition by Art Garfunkel got to No. 11 on the Adult Contemporary chart.
- In 1989, a salsa version by Henry Fiol was recorded for the album Renacimiento (El Abuelo Records).
- On the 1994 album Live: Out on the Road by the Flirtations.
