= I Swear (John Michael Montgomery song) =

1993 single by John Michael Montgomery

Single by John Michael Montgomery

from the album Kickin' It Up
- Released: November 19, 1993
- Genre: Country
- Length: 4:22
- Label: Atlantic Nashville
- Songwriters: Gary Baker; Frank J. Myers
- Producer: Scott Hendricks

John Michael Montgomery singles chronology
"Beer and Bones" (1993)	"I Swear" (1993)	"Rope the Moon" (1994)

Music video
- "I Swear" on YouTube

"I Swear" is a song written by Gary Baker and Frank J. Myers that became a hit for American country music artist John Michael Montgomery in 1993, and for American R&B group All-4-One in 1994.

Released in November 1993 by Atlantic Nashville as the lead single from Montgomery's second album, Kickin' It Up (1994), his version spent four weeks at number-one on the US Billboard Hot Country Singles & Tracks chart, later crossing over to pop radio and reaching number 42 on both the Billboard Hot 100 and Cash Box Top 100 charts in March. The single was accompanied by a music video directed by Marc Ball.

The cover by All-4-One was subsequently released in April 1994, becoming a number-one hit in numerous countries and later garnering a spot on Billboard's ranking of the "All-Time Top 100 Songs".

== Content ==
The song is a ballad in which the narrator promises his significant other that he will always love them.

== Personnel ==
Personnel are taken from the Kickin' It Up liner notes.

- Bill Cuomo – synthesizer
- Stuart Duncan – fiddle
- Paul Franklin – pedal steel guitar
- Steve Gibson – acoustic guitar
- Dann Huff – electric guitar
- Brent Mason – electric guitar
- Harry Stinson – background vocals
- Dennis Wilson – background vocals
- Lonnie Wilson – drums
- Glenn Worf – bass guitar
- Reese Wynans – piano

== Track listings ==
- CD maxi—United States (1993)
1. "I Swear" – 4:23
2. "Line on Love" – 2:37
3. "Dream on Texas Ladies" – 3:08
4. "Friday at Five" – 2:41

== Charts ==
=== Weekly charts ===
Weekly chart performance for John Michael Montgomery's version
Chart (1994)	Peak position
Canada Country Singles (RPM)	1
US Billboard Hot 100	42
US Hot Country Songs (Billboard)	1
US Cash Box Top 100	42

=== Year-end charts ===
Year-end chart performance for John Michael Montgomery's version
Chart (1994)	Position
Canada Country Tracks (RPM)	8
US Hot Country Singles & Tracks (Billboard)	1

== Certifications ==
Certifications and sales for John Michael Montgomery's version
Region	Certification	Certified units/sales
United States (RIAA)	Gold	500,000^{^}
^{^} Shipments figures based on certification alone.

== All-4-One version ==
"I Swear"

Single by All-4-One

from the album All-4-One
- Released: April 22, 1994
- Studio: David Foster's Malibu home studio
- Genre: Pop; R&B; soul
- Length: 4:18 (album version); 3:43 (radio edit)
- Label: Blitzz; Atlantic
- Songwriters: Gary Baker; Frank J. Myers
- Producer: David Foster

All-4-One singles chronology
"So Much in Love" (1993)	"I Swear" (1994)	"(She's Got) Skillz" (1994)

Music video
- "I Swear" on YouTube

Following the release of Montgomery's version, American male R&B pop group All-4-One recorded a cover version of "I Swear" with record producer David Foster for the group's eponymous 1994 debut album. The cover includes a lyric change: the original line from the second verse "And when there's silver in your hair" was replaced by "And when just the two of us are there".

Released on April 22, 1994, by Blitzz and Atlantic, All-4-One's version reached number one on numerous music charts, including the US Billboard Hot 100, where it remained for 11 consecutive weeks, and the Cash Box Top 100. The recording later ranked number 98 on Billboard's list of All-Time Top 100 Songs. In the United Kingdom, it spent a total of 18 weeks on the UK Singles Chart, peaking at number two for seven consecutive weeks, unable to dislodge Wet Wet Wet's "Love Is All Around" from number one. Its accompanying music video was directed by Marcus Nispel. The band won the Grammy Award for Best Pop Performance by a Duo or Group with Vocals for their version of the song.

=== Background and composition ===
After their first album had finished going through the mastering process of recording, Doug Morris, president of Atlantic Records called the group for a meeting. He showed them the original "I Swear" country record, asking All-4-One to do a cover of it promising to bring David Foster in for production. Singer Jamie Jones of the group was most hesitant about releasing the song due to the genre crossover. The group finished the recording at Foster's Malibu home studio.

=== Critical reception ===
American Billboard magazine named the song a "memorable anthem ballad". Billboard editor Larry Flick wrote, "Follow-up to the gold-selling 'So Much in Love' once again spotlights this male quartet's seamless harmonies. Producer David Foster supplies soft and pillowy synths, a caressing sax solo, and an overall splash of drama, which complements the unabashed romance of this hit-bound ballad. As teens enter prom season, expect this song to be the peak tune of the evening. Ahhh, young love ..." M.R. Martinez from Cash Box named it Pick of the Week, complimenting it as a single "complete with shimmering vocals, swooning pop arrangements, and throttled (yet soulful) vocals". Dave Sholin from the Gavin Report complimented the producer that "polishes it up just right for pop audiences who, like their country counterparts, will soak in the lyrics." He added, "Those contemplating matrimony will no doubt have this played while they're walking down the aisle, and those who've already tied the knot might want to renew their vows just so they can make 'I Swear' part of the ceremony."

Chuck Campbell from Knoxville News Sentinel noted its "more modern (i.e. more syrupy)" take. In his weekly UK chart commentary, James Masterton wrote, "Labelled by many as this year's 'End of the Road' you can see what all the hype is about. Four American teenagers singing in barber's shop harmonies makes for a gorgeous record. Whether it emulates its American success remains to be seen but Top 10 success is almost assured." Pan-European magazine Music & Media commented, "Since Whitney covered Dolly, Nashville is hip in the R&B milieu. Now the vocal harmony quartet halfway between Shai and Boyz II Men polishes John Michael Montgomery country number 1 hit." Alan Jones from Music Week gave it a score of four out of five, naming it a "pretty and powerful ballad", "[that] should be big". Pete Stanton from Smash Hits wrote, "'I Swear' was a peach: lovely sentiment which guaranteed you a slow dance down the disco."

=== Music video ===
A music video was produced to promote the single, directed by German director Marcus Nispel and filmed in Los Angeles. Marc Reshovsky directed photography and Anouk Frankel produced it with supervising producer Ellison Miller. The video has a sepia tone and portrays the members of All-4-One hanging out on a rooftop singing interspersed with scenes with a young woman walking on the sidewalk below. They spots her from the rooftop and go down to talk and walk with the woman as they implore her not to leave. Ultimately, she says goodbye to each member before boarding a departing bus. The video was nominated for Best New Artist Clip of the Year in the category for Pop/AC at the 1994 Billboard Music Video Awards. "I Swear" was later made available on YouTube in 2020, having generated more than 19 million views as of May 2025.

=== Other All-4-One versions ===
All-4-One and John Michael Montgomery recorded an updated duet version of "I Swear" for the deluxe edition of All-4-One's 2015 album Twenty+. A music video for this duet version was released on May 9, 2016. In 2021, All-4-One recorded a remix of "I Swear" for a music video promoting Xbox All-Access, titled "It's All There". A clip of the All-4-One has also been used in Gain laundry detergent TV ads in the US since 2021.

=== Track listings ===
- 7-inch single
1. "I Swear" (radio edit) – 3:43
2. "I Swear" (radio remix) – 4:19
- CD single
1. "I Swear" (radio edit) – 3:43
2. "I Swear" (radio remix) – 4:19
- CD maxi
1. "I Swear" (radio edit) – 3:43
2. "I Swear" (radio mix) – 4:18
3. "I Swear" (radio remix) – 4:18
4. "I Swear" (album version) – 4:18

=== Charts ===
==== Weekly charts ====
Weekly chart performance for All-4-One's cover
Chart (1994–1995)	Peak position
Australia (ARIA)	1
Austria (Ö3 Austria Top 40)	1
Belgium (Ultratop 50 Flanders)	2
Canada Top Singles (RPM)	1
Canada Adult Contemporary (RPM)	1
Denmark (IFPI)	1
El Salvador (UPI)	5
Europe (Eurochart Hot 100)	4
Europe (European AC Radio)	2
Europe (European Dance Radio)	10
Europe (European Hit Radio)	3
Finland (Suomen virallinen lista)	6
France (SNEP)	2
France Airplay (SNEP)	3
Germany (GfK)	1
Iceland (Íslenski Listinn Topp 40)	2
Ireland (IRMA)	3
Israel (Israeli Singles Chart)	2
Netherlands (Dutch Top 40)	1
Netherlands (Single Top 100)	1
New Zealand (Recorded Music NZ)	1
Norway (VG-lista)	2
Scottish Singles Sales (Official Charts)	3
Spain Airplay (Top 40 Radio)	1
Sweden (Sverigetopplistan)	1
Switzerland (Schweizer Hitparade)	1
UK Singles (Official Charts)	2
UK Airplay (Music Week)	3
UK Hip Hop/R&B (Official Charts)	18
US Billboard Hot 100	1
US Adult Contemporary (Billboard)	3
US Hot R&B Singles (Billboard)	13
US Top 40/Mainstream (Billboard)	1
US Top 40/Rhythm-Crossover (Billboard)	1
US Cash Box Top 100	1
Zimbabwe (ZIMA)	1

==== Year-end charts ====
Year-end chart performance for All-4-One's cover
Chart (1994)	Position
Australia (ARIA)	2
Austria (Ö3 Austria Top 40)	5
Belgium (Ultratop)	9
Brazil (Brazilian Radio Airplay)	9
Canada Top Singles (RPM)	12
Canada Adult Contemporary (RPM)	7
Europe (Eurochart Hot 100)	7
Europe (European AC Radio)	7
Europe (European Hit Radio)	7
France (SNEP)	15
France Airplay (SNEP)	35
Germany (Media Control)	2
Iceland (Íslenski Listinn Topp 40)	37
Israel (Israeli Singles Chart)	17
Netherlands (Dutch Top 40)	14
Netherlands (Single Top 100)	11
New Zealand (RIANZ)	2
Sweden (Topplistan)	9
Switzerland (Schweizer Hitparade)	4
UK Singles (OCC)	5
UK Airplay (Music Week)	8
US Billboard Hot 100	2
US Adult Contemporary (Billboard)	25
US Hot R&B Singles (Billboard)	58
US Cash Box Top 100	3

==== Decade-end charts ====
Decade-end chart performance for All-4-One's cover
Chart (1990–1999)	Position
Austria (Ö3 Austria Top 40)	85
UK Singles (OCC)	67
US Billboard Hot 100	9

==== All-time charts ====
All-time chart performance for All-4-One's cover
Chart	Position
US Billboard Hot 100	98

=== Certifications ===
Certifications and sales for All-4-One's cover
Region	Certification	Certified units/sales
Australia (ARIA)	2× Platinum	140,000^{^}
Austria (IFPI Austria)	Platinum	50,000^{*}
Germany (BVMI)	Platinum	500,000^{^}
Netherlands (NVPI)	Gold	50,000^{^}
New Zealand (RMNZ)	Platinum	10,000^{*}
Sweden (GLF)	Gold	25,000^{^}
United Kingdom (BPI) Physical sales	Platinum	600,000^{^}
United Kingdom (BPI) Sales since 2004	Gold	400,000^{‡}
United States (RIAA)	Platinum	1,500,000
^{*} Sales figures based on certification alone.^{^} Shipments figures based on certification alone.^{‡} Sales+streaming figures based on certification alone.

=== Release history ===
Release dates and formats for All-4-One's cover
Region	Date	Format(s)	Label(s)	Ref.
United States	April 22, 1994	7-inch vinyl; cassette	Blitzz; Atlantic	
United Kingdom	June 6, 1994	7-inch vinyl; CD; cassette	Atlantic	
Australia	July 4, 1994	CD; cassette	Atlantic	
Japan	July 25, 1994	CD	Atlantic	

== Other versions ==
In 1996 Canto/Mando Pop Goddess Sandy Lam covered the song with 4 of her friends Chiyi, Teresa Carpio and Prudence Lau on her all English cover album entitled "I Swear". The final eleven contestants from Popstars: Girls forever, ninth season of TV talent show POPSTARS in Germany, they released a cover version of the song with Gary Baker on November 19, 2010. The finalists premiered the song live on the November 18 edition of the program; the single was available for digital download on November 16, 2010, and a physical release followed the day after the live performance of the song. The song was recorded at Noiseblock Studios in Florence, Alabama. The cover reached number 69 on the German Singles Chart.

The Brazilian version of the song I Swear, titled Eu Juro, was performed by the popular sertanejo duo Leandro & Leonardo. Released in 1995 as part of their album Leandro & Leonardo Vol. 10, the song adapted the romantic theme of the original into Portuguese, maintaining its heartfelt message. Eu Juro became a hit in Brazil, resonating with fans of the duo and contributing to the success of their album. The adaptation preserved the essence of the original, while adding a distinctly Brazilian flair typical of the sertanejo genre.
