= All-4-One =

American R&B and pop group

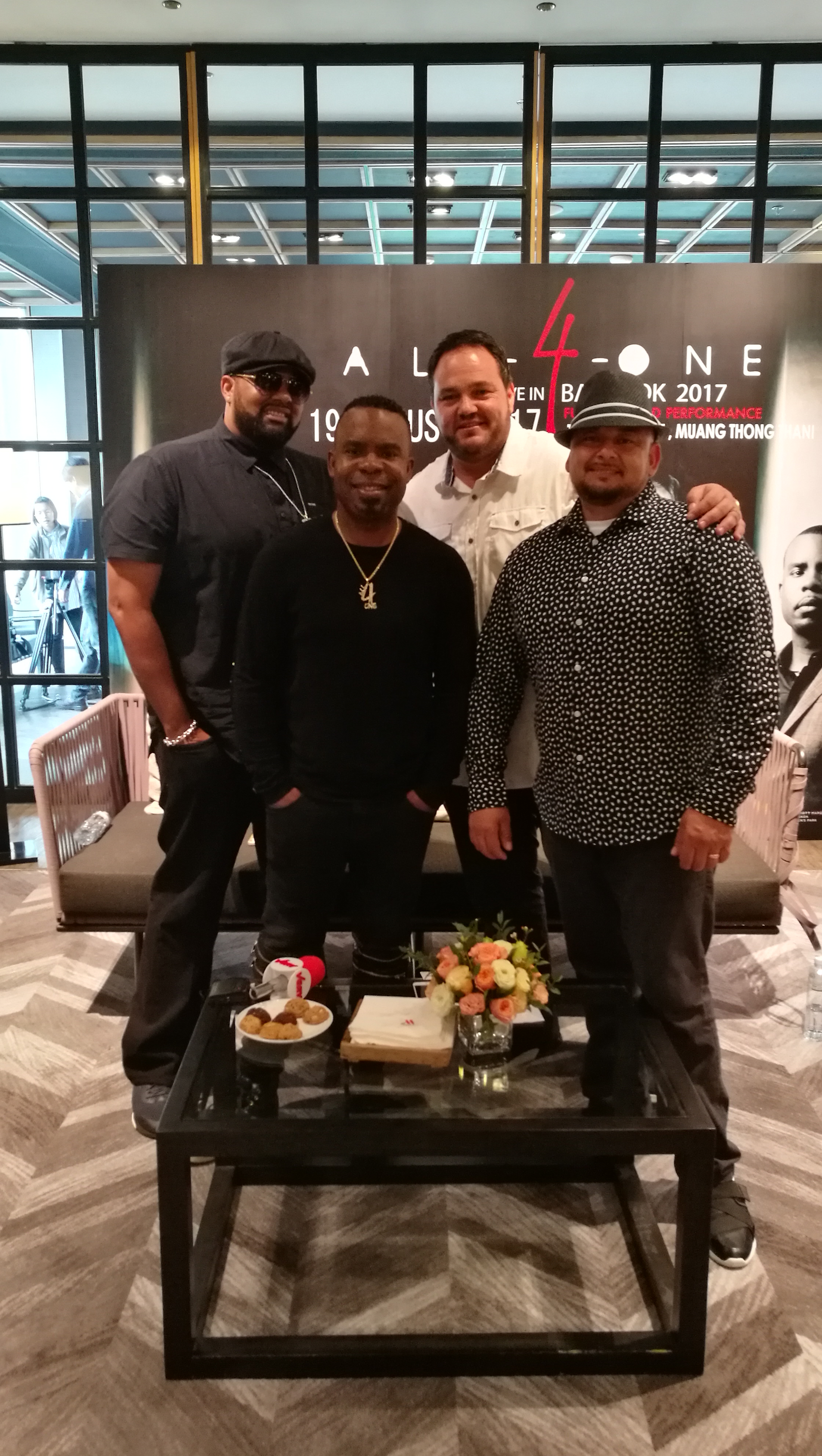
- All-4-One in Bangkok. From left: Jones, Kennedy, Borowiak, Nevarez.

Background information
- Origin: Antelope Valley, California, U.S.
- Genres: R&B; pop
- Years active: 1993–present
- Labels: Atlantic; Discretion; EMI America; Peak
- Members: Jamie Jones; Delious Kennedy; Alfred Nevarez; Tony Borowiak

All-4-One is an American male R&B and pop group best known for their hit singles "I Swear", "So Much in Love" and "I Can Love You Like That". The group is composed of band members Jamie Jones, Delious Kennedy, Alfred Nevarez, and Tony Borowiak, all from the Antelope Valley and Mojave, California areas.

== Background ==
The group's history can be traced back to producers Tim O'Brien and Gary St. Clair who had a hand in putting the group together. Jamie Jones, Tony Borowiak and Alfred Nevarez had been singing jingles for Antelope Valley radio station KAVS-FM when they were asked by music producer Gary St. Clair to record "So Much in Love" for the Blitzz record label, an Atlantic Records affiliate. The three members were joined by Delious Kennedy, thus making the group a quartet.

The deal with Blitzz was originally intended for just a lone single. However the song became a hit and the group started work on their debut album which included original compositions. Both O'Brien and St. Clair produced the album. The name for the group came from Tim O'Brien.

== Career ==
=== Atlantic Records years (1993–1999) ===
All-4-One's hit "I Swear" won a Grammy Award in 1995 for Best Pop Performance by a Duo or Group with Vocal, and enjoyed an eleven-week run at number one on the Billboard Hot 100, as well as a six-week run at number one on the Australian Singles Chart and a seven-week run at No. 2 on the UK Singles Chart. Other RIAA gold-certified hits by the group include remakes of "So Much in Love" (1993), "I Can Love You Like That" (1995), and "Someday" from the soundtrack to Disney's 1996 animated film The Hunchback of Notre Dame.

=== Post-Atlantic (2000–present) ===
A rift between their independent label, Blitzz Records, and their major label, Atlantic Records, led to the group leaving Atlantic as well as Blitzz Records after the release of their album On & On in 1999. The shift in labels left the group in limbo for a few years as they contemplated their next move. In 2001, the follow-up album, A41, was released on AMC Records and yielded "Beautiful as U", a top 20 hit on the Radio & Records Adult Contemporary chart. The group's 2004 album, Split Personality, was given an Asia-only release, and subsequently gave them Asian hits with "Someone Who Lives in Your Heart" and "I Just Wanna Be Your Everything". For much of the 2000s, All-4-One spent their time touring Asia, in cities such as Tokyo, Kuala Lumpur, Singapore, Seoul, Bangkok, Shanghai and Sydney.

In 2009, All-4-One released No Regrets on the Peak Records/Concord Music Group label. The album was largely created in-house, with the group doing the writing for the album, and Jamie Jones' production company, the Heavyweights, doing a lot of the production work. The CD produced the Urban Adult Contemporary hit "My Child", co-written by Delious Kennedy and Jamie Jones.

In June 2015, Billboard premiered the first single, "Baby Love", from All-4-One's 20th anniversary album, Twenty+.

In 2016, All-4-One joined the inaugural "I Love the 90's" Tour with their peers Salt-N-Pepa, Vanilla Ice, Coolio, Kid 'n Play, Biz Markie, Color Me Badd, Rob Base, Tone Loc, Young MC and Kool Moe Dee. The four original members were still together in 2023, when they were booked for a Christmas Day concert at Resorts World Genting in Malaysia.

== Solo ventures ==
In 2004, Jones released the album Illuminate on Genesis Records.

Kennedy is the co-founder of the Catalina Film Festival, known as the West Coast's version of the Cannes Film Festival. The Catalina Film Festival is a destination festival located just off the coast of Los Angeles on Santa Catalina Island, California.

In 2012, Kennedy released a single he co-wrote titled "My Rose" which peaked at No. 44 on Billboard's Hot Dance/Club chart.

In 2016, Kennedy launched his talk show, Flashback Tonight, which interviews celebrities from the 1980s, 1990s and early 2000s. Guests have included Richard Marx, Rick Springfield, Taylor Dayne, Karyn White, Marla Gibbs, and Coolio.

== Members ==
- Jamie Jones (born November 6, 1974)
- Delious Kennedy (born December 21, 1970)
- Alfred Nevarez (born May 17, 1973)
- Tony Borowiak (born October 12, 1972)

== Discography ==
=== Studio albums ===
- All-4-One (1994)
- And the Music Speaks (1995)
- On and On (1999)
- A41 (2002)
- Split Personality (2004)
- No Regrets (2009)
- Twenty+ (2015)
