= Where the Light Is (John Mayer album) =

Where the Light Is: John Mayer Live in Los Angeles

Live album by John Mayer
- Released: July 1, 2008
- Recorded: December 8, 2007
- Venues: L.A. Live Nokia Theatre (Los Angeles, California)
- Genres: Blues rock, pop rock
- Length: 124:16
- Label: Columbia
- Producers: Chad Franscoviak; John Mayer; Steve Jordan

John Mayer chronology
The Village Sessions (2006)	Where the Light Is: John Mayer Live in Los Angeles (2008)	Battle Studies (2009)

Where the Light Is: John Mayer Live in Los Angeles, commonly referred to as Where the Light Is, is a live album and concert film by American musician John Mayer. Released on July 1, 2008, the album documents Mayer's performance at the Nokia Theatre at L.A. Live in Los Angeles, California on December 8, 2007, during the promotional tour for his 2006 third studio album Continuum.

The concert, which was for the Annual John Mayer Holiday Charity Revue, featured three separate performances: the first an acoustic set opened by Mayer and joined by the guitarists from his band, the second with the John Mayer Trio, and the third with Mayer's regular touring band. The title of the album is taken from a line in the song "Gravity", which was released as the second single from Continuum on January 31, 2007. Where the Light Is was released in a number of formats, including, for the audio album, Compact Disc, LP album and digital download; and, for the video album, DVD and Blu-ray Disc; as well as a 2CD+DVD set. The DVD and Blu-ray bonus material includes footage of Mayer backstage and playing outside on Mulholland Drive.

His acoustic cover of "Free Fallin'," originally by Tom Petty, was released as a single and met with wide critical acclaim.

The songs “No Such Thing” and “Bigger than My Body” were played on the evening as well but did not make it to the final release. This is likely due to John singing an incorrect lyric in “No Such Thing”, singing “Well I never lived the kings of the prom kings” rather than the correct lyric, “Well I never lived the dreams of the prom kings”, as well as a noticeable tempo increase about 3 minutes into the song. As for "Bigger than My Body", there’s some speculation that J.J. Johnson and David LaBruyere (drums and bass, respectively) lost the beat about 3 minutes into the song.

== Reception ==
Professional ratings
Review scores
Source	Rating
AllMusic	3.5/5 stars
The Music Box	3/5 stars
Rolling Stone	3.5/5 stars

Guitarist magazine gave the album five stars, saying the disc proves that "Mayer, 30, is the complete package as a singer, songwriter and guitarist."

In the United States, the album debuted on the Billboard 200 albums chart at number five and has sold 258,359 copies.

The album also debuted in Australia on the ARIA Albums Chart at number 30. It also debuted at number-two on the Top 40 DVD chart. In its second week, the album was certified gold by ARIA for DVD shipments of 7,500 copies.

== Track listing ==
Acoustic set
No.	Title	Writer(s)	Original release	Length
1.	"Neon"	John Mayer, Clay Cook	Inside Wants Out (1999)	5:55
2.	"Stop This Train"	Mayer	Continuum (2006)	5:00
3.	"In Your Atmosphere (LA Song)"	Mayer	Previously unreleased	5:45
4.	"Daughters"	Mayer	Heavier Things (2003)	5:04
5.	"Free Fallin'" (Tom Petty cover)	Tom Petty, Jeff Lynne	Previously unreleased	4:23
Total length:				26:07

Trio set
No.	Title	Writer(s)	Original release	Length
6.	"Everyday I Have the Blues"	Blues standard	Previously unreleased	4:14
7.	"Wait Until Tomorrow" (The Jimi Hendrix Experience cover)	Jimi Hendrix	Try! (2005)	4:19
8.	"Who Did You Think I Was"	Mayer	Try! (2005)	4:23
9.	"Come When I Call"	Mayer	"Who Did You Think I Was" (2005)	3:23
10.	"Good Love Is on the Way"	Mayer, Steve Jordan, Pino Palladino	Try! (2005)	4:18
11.	"Out of My Mind"	Mayer	Try! (2005)	10:10
12.	"Vultures"	Mayer, Jordan, Palladino	Try! (2005)	5:19
13.	"Bold as Love" (The Jimi Hendrix Experience cover)	Hendrix	Continuum (2006)	8:38
Total length:				44:44

Band set
No.	Title	Writer(s)	Original release	Length
1.	"Waiting on the World to Change"	Mayer	Continuum (2006)	3:50
2.	"Slow Dancing in a Burning Room"	Mayer	Continuum (2006)	5:19
3.	"Why Georgia"	Mayer	Room for Squares (2001)	4:27
4.	"The Heart of Life / In Repair"	Mayer	Continuum (2006)	3:40
5.	"I Don't Need No Doctor" (Ray Charles cover)	Joseph Armstead, Nick Ashford, Valerie Simpson	That's What I Say: John Scofield Plays the Music of Ray Charles (John Scofield ft. John Mayer) (2005)	6:02
6.	"I've Got Dreams to Remember (Otis Redding cover) / Gravity"	Otis Redding, Zelma Redding, Joe Rock/Mayer	Try! (2005)	9:41
7.	"I Don't Trust Myself (With Loving You)"	Mayer	Continuum (2006)	8:44
8.	"Belief"	Mayer	Continuum (2006)	6:03
9.	"I'm Gonna Find Another You"	Mayer	Continuum (2006)	5:40
Total length:				53:26

== Personnel ==
Musicians

All sets:

- John Mayer – lead vocals, lead guitar, production

John Mayer Trio set:

- Steve Jordan – drums, backing vocals, production
- Pino Palladino – bass

John Mayer band set:

- David Ryan Harris – rhythm guitar, tambourine, backing vocals
- Robbie McIntosh – guitar, slide guitar, backing vocals
- David LaBruyere – bass
- J.J. Johnson – drums
- Tim Bradshaw – keyboards, lap steel guitar, backing vocals
- Bob Reynolds – tenor saxophone, soprano saxophone
- Brad Mason – trumpet, flugelhorn

Audio production personnel

- Chad Franscoviak – production, mixing
- Ed Cherney – engineering
- Ian Charbonneau – engineering
- Anthony Catalano – Pro Tools engineering
- Martin Pradler – mixing
- Jeremy Underwood – mixing assistance
- Stephen Marcussen – mastering

Video production personnel

- Michael McDonald – executive production
- Lindha Narvaez – production
- Paul Greenhouse – editing

Additional personnel

- Vance Burberry – photography

== Charts ==
=== Weekly charts ===
Weekly chart performance for Where the Light Is
Chart (2008–2011)	Peak position
Australian Albums (ARIA)	30
Australian Music DVD (ARIA)	2
Australian Physical Albums (ARIA)	39
Canadian Albums (Billboard)	9
Danish Albums (Hitlisten)	15
Dutch Albums (Album Top 100)	16
Dutch Combialbums (Album Top 100)	84
Dutch Midprice Albums (Album Top 100)	9
Dutch Music DVD (MegaCharts)	1
German Albums (Offizielle Top 100)	81
New Zealand Albums (RMNZ)	22
US Billboard 200	5
US Top Catalog Albums (Billboard)	44
US Top Digital Albums (Billboard)	2
US Top Internet Albums (Billboard)	3
US Top Music Video Sales (Billboard)	1
US Top Rock Albums (Billboard)	2
US Indie Store Album Sales (Billboard)	7

=== Year-end charts ===
Year-end chart performance for Where the Light Is
Chart (2008)	Position
US Billboard 200	149

== Certifications ==
Album certifications for Where the Light Is
Region	Certification	Certified units/sales
Denmark (IFPI Danmark)	2× Platinum	40,000^{‡}
United States (RIAA)	Platinum	1,000,000^{‡}
^{‡} Sales+streaming figures based on certification alone.

Video certifications for Where the Light Is
Region	Certification	Certified units/sales
Australia (ARIA)	3× Platinum	45,000^{^}
Brazil (Pro-Música Brasil)	Gold	15,000^{*}
United States (RIAA)	Platinum	100,000^{^}
^{*} Sales figures based on certification alone.^{^} Shipments figures based on certification alone.
