= Any Given Thursday =

2003 live album by John Mayer

Live album by John Mayer
- Released: February 11, 2003 (CD version); February 25, 2003 (DVD version)
- Recorded: September 12, 2002
- Venue: Oak Mountain Amphitheater (Birmingham, Alabama)
- Genres: Pop rock, blues rock
- Length: 102:25
- Labels: Columbia, Aware, SMV Enterprises
- Producer: John Alagia

John Mayer chronology
Room for Squares (2001)	Any Given Thursday (2003)	Heavier Things (2003)

Any Given Thursday is a live CD/DVD by John Mayer, recorded in Birmingham, Alabama at the Oak Mountain Amphitheater on September 12, 2002, during the Room for Squares tour. The album quickly peaked at #17 on the Billboard 200 chart. It features mostly songs from Room for Squares, as well as several covers, including "Lenny" by Stevie Ray Vaughan and "Message in a Bottle" by The Police. Covers have since become a regular feature in Mayer's live shows.

== Production and content ==
Though mostly featuring songs from Room For Squares, the album also features "Man On The Side" (co-written with Cook and appeared on the Lo-Fi Master's Demo) and "Covered in Rain", neither of which have ever been released on a studio recording by John Mayer. "Covered in Rain", according to a documentary included in the DVD release, is "part two" of the song "City Love", which features the line, "covered in rain." The concert features songs previously not heard, such as "Something's Missing", which appeared on Heavier Things, his following album. It also features "Comfortable" from his original EP, Inside Wants Out. John Mayer also features his newly recorded song at the time " 3x5 " .

The DVD contained several features in addition to the concert: an audio commentary of the concert by Mayer and his friend Scotty Crowe (whose blog used to be hosted on Mayer's site), a photo gallery from the tour (not exclusively the concert shown in the video itself), and a documentary of an interview with Mayer entitled, "The Morning After", in which Mayer talks about his influences, some meanings of songs, and just general information about Mayer.

== Reception ==
Professional ratings
Review scores
Source	Rating
Allmusic	3/5 stars
Entertainment Weekly	B−
Robert Christgau	(dud)
PopMatters	mixed
The Rolling Stone Album Guide	2/5 stars

The CD/DVD received conservative consistent praise with critics torn between his pop-idol image, and (at the time) emerging guitar prowess. Erik Crawford (of AllMusic) asked "Is he the consummate guitar hero exemplified when he plays a cover of Stevie Ray Vaughan's 'Lenny', or is he the teen idol that the pubescent girls shriek for after he plays 'Your Body Is a Wonderland'?" Billboard called the DVD "a great introduction to a rising star." David Browne, with Entertainment Weekly, gave the album a B− saying, "one wishes Mayer were a more convincing rebel, but at least he doth protest a little."

Commercially, Any Given Thursday entered the Billboard Albums Top 100 chart at number 34. It peaked at #23 for one week, and spent a total of 12 weeks on the chart. It quickly peaked at #17 on the Billboard 200 chart. In Australia, the DVD is certified 3× platinum by ARIA for sales of 45,000 copies.

== Track listing ==
All songs written by John Mayer unless noted otherwise.

=== Disc one ===
1. "3x5" – 8:05
2. "No Such Thing" (Clay Cook, John Mayer) – 4:46
3. "Back to You" – 4:36
4. "City Love" – 5:11
5. "Something's Missing" – 6:47
6. "Man on the Side" Medley – 8:46
  - "Lenny" (Stevie Ray Vaughan)
  - "Man on the Side" (Cook, Mayer)
7. "Message in a Bottle" The Police – 5:06
  - Features "Jóga" (DVD version only) (Björk)
8. "Love Song for No One" (Cook, Mayer) – 3:35

=== Disc two ===
1. "Why Georgia" – 8:24
2. "Your Body Is a Wonderland" – 6:05 Note: Mayer preempts playing this song by telling the audience that he wrote it in Birmingham.
3. "My Stupid Mouth" – 5:02
4. "Covered in Rain" – 10:25
5. "83" Medley – 7:29
  - "83" (Mayer)
  - "Girls Just Want to Have Fun" (Robert Hazard)
  - "Let's Hear It for the Boy" (Tom Snow, Dean Pitchford)
6. "Comfortable" (Cook, Mayer) – 7:37
7. "Neon" (Cook, Mayer) – 10:22
  - Features a drum solo and a bass guitar solo

=== DVD version ===
1. Introduction
2. "3x5" – 8:05
3. "No Such Thing" (Cook, Mayer) – 4:46
4. "Back to You" – 4:36
5. "City Love" – 5:11
6. "Something's Missing" – 6:47
7. "Man on the Side" Medley – 8:46
  - "Lenny" (Vaughan)
  - "Man on the Side" (Cook, Mayer)
8. "Message in a Bottle" (Sting) – 5:06
  - Features "Jóga" as an interlude (Björk)
9. "Love Song for No One" (Cook, Mayer) – 3:35
10. "Why Georgia" – 8:24
11. "Your Body Is a Wonderland" – 6:05
12. "My Stupid Mouth" – 5:02
13. "Covered in Rain" – 10:25
14. "83" Medley – 7:29
  - "83" (Mayer)
  - "Girls Just Want to Have Fun" (Hazard)
  - "Let's Hear It For The Boy" (T. Snow, D. Pitchford)
15. "Comfortable" (Cook, Mayer) – 7:37
16. "Neon" (Cook, Mayer) – 10:22
  - Features a drum solo and a bass guitar solo
17. Credits

== Personnel ==
- John Mayer – vocals, guitars, keyboards
- Michael Chaves – keyboards, guitars, backing vocals
- David LaBruyere – bass guitars
- Stephen Chopek – drums, percussion

== Differences between the DVD and CD releases ==
- The song "Jóga" (originally by experimental musical artist Björk) does not appear on the CD release due to copyright troubles; however, it does appear on the DVD.
- Between many songs, the CD contains some brief comments by Mayer. On the DVD, these comments tend to be longer, including a few long monologues referred to by Mayer himself as "John's Story Time" (on the DVD commentary).
- Extended introductory explanations to songs (such as "City Love" and "Covered in Rain").

=== Certifications ===
Video certifications for Any Given Thursday
Region	Certification	Certified units/sales
Australia (ARIA)	3× Platinum	45,000^{^}
^{^} Shipments figures based on certification alone.
