= Annual John Mayer Holiday Charity Revue =

Annual charity event hosted by John Mayer

- Charity concert by John Mayer

The Annual John Mayer Holiday Charity Revue began in December 2007.

== First revue (2007) ==
=== Overview ===
The first event was a charity concert performance held by American musician John Mayer on December 8, 2007. The performance consisted of three sets, beginning with Mayer performing solo on an acoustic guitar, followed by a performance with the John Mayer Trio, with the trio's members Steve Jordan and Pino Palladino. The third and final set of the concert featured Mayer's full touring band. The performance is set to become an annual event with a similar structure occurring every year. The concert was held at the Nokia Theater in Los Angeles. The charities supported by the event included Toys for Tots, Inner City Arts, and the Los Angeles Mission. The performance was recorded on both audio and video. The resulting video was directed by Danny Clinch and was released with the title Where the Light Is on both DVD and Blu-ray disc.

=== Performance repertoire ===
The concert performance consisted of three sets. The listing provided here is the original performance's sequence.

==== Solo acoustic set ====
1. "Neon"
2. "Stop This Train"
3. "In Your Atmosphere"
4. "Daughters" - featuring Robbie McIntosh on guitar
5. "Free Fallin'" - Featuring Robbie McIntosh and David Ryan Harris

==== John Mayer Trio set ====
1. "Everyday I Have the Blues"
2. "Wait Until Tomorrow"
3. "Who Did You Think I Was"
4. "Come When I Call"
5. "Good Love Is on the Way"
6. "Out of My Mind"
7. "Vultures"
8. "Bold As Love"

==== Full Band set ====
1. "Waiting on the World to Change"
2. "No Such Thing"
3. "Bigger than My Body
4. "Slow Dancing In a Burning Room"
5. "Why Georgia"
6. "Heart of Life"
7. "In Repair"
8. "I Don't Need No Doctor"
9. "Gravity"

==== Encore ====
1. "I Don't Trust Myself (With Loving You)" - Full band and Pino Palladino
2. "Belief" - Full band with Pino Palladino and Steve Jordan
3. "I'm Gonna Find Another You" - Full band with Palladino and Jordan

== Second revue (2008) ==
=== Overview ===
The second Annual Holiday Charity Revue was held at the Nokia Theater in Los Angeles on December 6, 2008. Proceeds from the event were donated to the local non-profit organizations Toys for Tots and the Los Angeles Food Bank. Concert attendees were encouraged to bring an unwrapped toy with a value of $10 or more. British singer-songwriter Adele opened up for him that night. The concert was named On His Own, because Mayer performed the whole concert alone with the assistance of a drum machine and a recorder to overdub his guitar.

=== Set list ===
The following songs were performed at the 2nd Annual Holiday Charity Revue on December 6, 2008

1. "Little Red Corvette"
2. "Stop This Train"
3. "Belief" ("Inner City Blues")
4. "Hummingbird"
5. "Comfortable"
6. "Free Fallin'"
7. "I Heard It Through The Grapevine" ("Love Lockdown")
8. "Vultures"
9. "Your Body Is A Wonderland"
10. "Neon"
11. "Something's Missing (John Mayer song) In Your Atmosphere"
12. "Waiting On The World To Change"
13. "Wheel"
14. "Sucker"
15. "Not Myself"
16. "Victoria"
17. "Karma Police"
18. "My Stupid Mouth"
19. "Why Georgia"
20. "St. Patrick's Day" ("No Such Thing")

Encore

21. "Crossroads"
22. "Who Did You Think I Was"
23. "Gravity" ("I've Got Dreams to Remember")
24. "Clarity Remix" ("Lost!" and "No Hook")
