= John Alagía =

American record producer and composer

- Born: John Justin Alagía; Louisville, Kentucky, U.S.
- Occupations: Record producer; composer; mixer
- Formerly of: Derryberry and Alagia

John Justin Alagía is an American record producer, composer, mixer and co-founder of Drive Music. Alagia has worked with artists including Lukas Nelson, Paul Simon, Herbie Hancock, Dave Matthews, John Mayer, Jason Mraz, Serena Ryder, Brett Dennen, Rachael Yamagata, Ben Folds, Lifehouse and many others.

In his early years, Alagía honed his recording and production skills with friend Douglas Derryberry at Rutabaga Studios in Arlington, Virginia. Derryberry and Alagía were also an acoustic rock duo, having released three albums and done extensive touring along the East Coast. Together, they recorded and produced many Mid-Atlantic acts ranging from DMB, Vertical Horizon, Edwin McCain to Ben Folds Five and others. Today, John resides at the Village Recorder in West Los Angeles.

== Derryberry and Alagía ==
John was a member of a band known as Derryberry and Alagía. This collaboration featured Doug Derryberry. The group released three records, as follows:

- Reinvigorating the Wheel
- Rutabaga Stew
- Southpaw

== Partial discography ==
=== Ben Folds Five ===
- Various Live Recordings
- Naked Baby Photos
- Space Reels
- Tom and Mary

=== Blue Man Group ===
- The Complex - Billboard Top 200 peak - #60

=== BoDeans ===
- American Made (2012)

=== Brett Dennen ===
- Hope For The Hopeless

=== Dave Matthews Band ===
- The Central Park Concert - Billboard Top 200 peak - #14
- Busted Stuff - Billboard Top 200 peak - #1
- Grey Street - Top 40 singles peak - #18
- Listener Supported - Billboard Top 200 peak - #15
- Live in Chicago 12.19.98 - Billboard Top 200 peak - #6
- Live at Folsom Field, Boulder, Colorado - Billboard Top 200 peak - #9
- Live at Red Rocks 8.15.95
- Remember Two Things
- Recently
- Under the Table and Dreaming
- Crash
- Before These Crowded Streets - additional pre-production (Produced by Steve Lillywhite)
- Live at Red Rocks
- Weekend On the Rocks
- Eh Hee
- Walk Around The Moon

=== David Gray ===
- Live at Joe's Pub

=== The Hogwaller Ramblers ===
- The Hogwaller Ramblers, 1998

=== Josh Kelley ===
- For the Ride Home - Billboard Top 200 peak - #159
- Amazing - Top 40 singles peak - #8

=== John Mayer ===
- Room for Squares (2001) - Billboard Top 200 peak - #8
- Any Given Thursday (2003) - Billboard Top 200 peak - #17
- "No Such Thing" - Billboard Hot 100 singles peak - #13
- "Your Body Is a Wonderland" (2002) - Billboard Hot 100 singles peak - #18
- "Why Georgia" (2003) - Billboard Adult Top 40 singles peak - #8
- Continuum - Billboard Top 200 peak - #2

=== Jason Mraz ===
- You and I Both - Top 40 singles peak - #15
- Waiting for My Rocket to Come Billboard Top 200 peak - #55
- The Remedy (2003) - Top 40 singles peak - #4

=== Evermore ===
- Dreams (2004) - ARIA certified Platinum
- Real Life (2006) - ARIA certified Platinum

=== Lifehouse ===
- Self-titled (2005) - Gold

=== Mandy Moore ===
- Wild Hope (2007) Billboard Top 200 peak - #30

=== Once Hush ===
- Say It Anyway (1996)

=== Vertical Horizon ===
- Running on Ice (1995)
- Live Stages (1997)

=== Rachael Yamagata ===
- Happenstance (2004)
- Chesapeake (2011)
- Tightrope Walker (2016)

=== Ben Lee ===
- Ripe (2007)

=== Liz Phair ===
- Somebody's Miracle (2005)- Billboard Top 200 peak - #46

=== Katharine McPhee ===
- Unbroken (January 5, 2010) - Billboard Top 200 peak - #27

=== Madi Diaz ===
- Plastic Moon (2010)

=== Terra Naomi ===
- To Know I'm OK (2011)

=== Lena Fayre ===
- I am Not A Man (2014)
