= The Brilliant Inventions =

Folk rock duo

- Origin: Atlanta, Georgia, United States
- Genres: Folk rock pop
- Years active: 2004–2010
- Label: Independent
- Past members: Josh Lamkin; Eliot Bronson
- Website: thebrilliantinventions.com

The Brilliant Inventions were an Atlanta-based folk rock duo consisting of Josh Lamkin and Eliot Bronson. In 2008 they were voted Best New Local Musical Act in a Creative xD Loafing readers' poll. They have toured with bands such as They Might Be Giants and Jump Little Children. In 2009, they released their first studio album, Have You Changed. They also are two-time winners of the Eddie's Attic Open Mic Shootout; other winners of the contest include John Mayer and Shawn Mullins. Bronson has gained some attention for a YouTube parody of American Idol contestant Renaldo Lapuz's "We're Brothers Forever". The band broke up in 2010 with Lamkin retiring and Bronson going on to a solo career.

== Discography ==
- Standing Room: Live at the Red Light Cafe (2005)
- Exposure (2006)
- Have You Changed (2009)

== Awards ==
- 2005 Winner Eddie's Attic Open Mic Shootout
- 2008 Best Local Musical Act from Creative Loafing
- 2009 Falcon Ridge Folk Festival Emerging Artist Award
