= Call Me Out =

Call Me Out may refer to:

- "Call Me Out", song by Ra Ra Riot from Need Your Light 2016
- "Call Me Out", song by Gareth Asher and the Earthlings
- "Call Me Out", song by Shook Twins
- "Call Me Out", song by Sarah Close 2017
