= Eliot Bronson =

American singer-songwriter

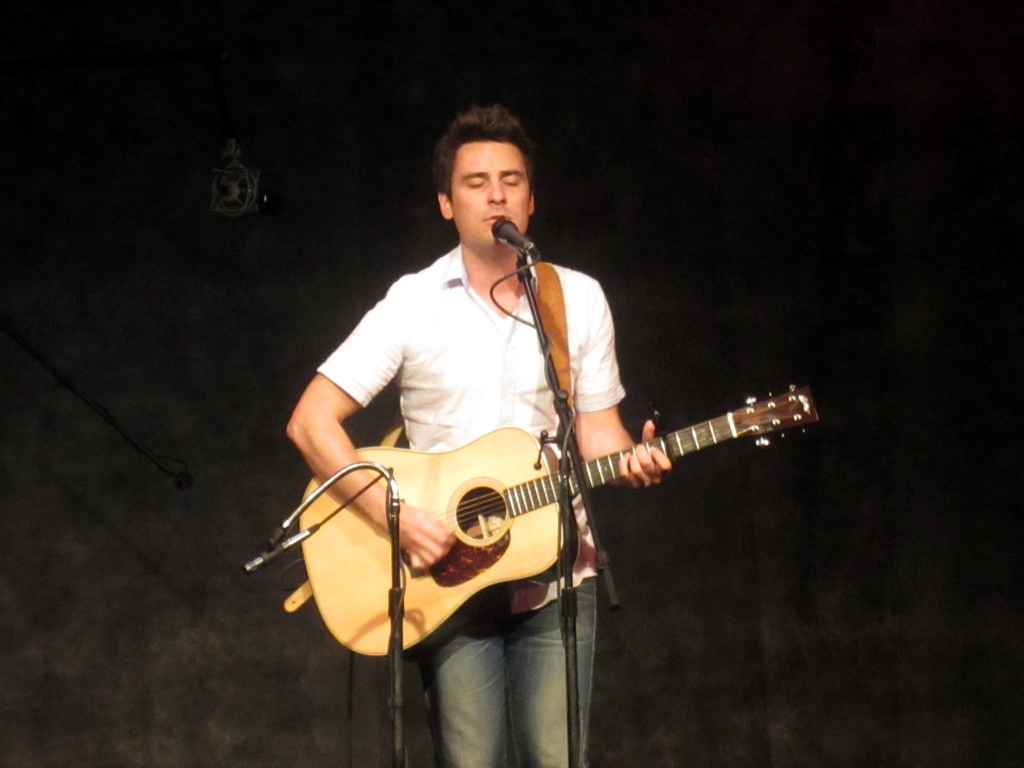
- Bronson performing in Duluth, Georgia in 2012

Background information
- Born: Eliot James Bronson; Baltimore, Maryland, United States
- Origin: Atlanta, Georgia, United States
- Genres: Americana, Alt. Country, Contemporary Folk
- Years active: 2000 – present
- Label: Saturn 5 Records
- Website: www.eliotbronson.com

Eliot James Bronson is an American singer-songwriter known for being part of the musical duo The Brilliant Inventions and the band Yonder Orphans.

== Early life and career ==
Bronson was born in Baltimore, Maryland. He began playing at local coffeehouses and was dubbed a "folk singing wunderkind" by The Baltimore Sun. He later moved to Atlanta, where he formed the duo The Brilliant Inventions. The band became a staple of the Atlanta music scene, winning several local and national music awards and gaining a substantial fan following. In 2010, the band split up and Bronson continued solo, releasing Blackbirds in 2011. In 2012, Bronson released Milwaukee, with his band Yonder Orphans (Kevin Leahy, Will Robertson and Bret Hartley).

== Career (2014–present) ==
In 2014, Bronson signed with independent music label, Saturn 5 Records. The ten-song self-titled album Eliot Bronson was recorded totally analog in Nashville by producer Dave Cobb (Sturgill Simpson, Jason Isbell). On the album, he used a rare Helios mixing console and a tape machine on loan from the Norman Petty Estate, which was also used to record Buddy Holly in the 1950s.

Eliot Bronson was recorded in one week at Cobb's home studio and The Sound Emporium, and mixed the following week. Other musicians on the album include Bret Hartley, Chris Powell, Adam Gardner, Kristen Rogers and Dave Cobb.

The album received critical acclaim and numerous "Top Album" ranking in the United States and Europe. Bronson was dubbed by Bop n Jazz as "maybe the best singer/songwriter since Dylan".

Bronson signed to Nashville-based Rock Ridge Music in a joint deal with Atlanta-based Hubbub! Music in May 2017. In August 2017, he released his next album James also produced by Nashville-based producer Dave Cobb. The album includes Rough Ride, a song about fellow Baltimorean Freddie Gray. The track Mercy was featured on episode 13.13 on the television show Criminal Minds.

== Discography ==
- Standing Room (2005) The Brilliant Inventions
- Exposure (2006) The Brilliant Inventions
- Have You Changed (2009) The Brilliant Inventions
- Blackbirds (2011)
- Milwaukee (2012) with Yonder Orphans
- Eliot Bronson (2014)
- James (2017)
- Empty Spaces (2020)
- Talking to Myself (2024)
- New Album Anticipated (2026)

== Awards ==
- 2005 Winner Eddie's Attic Shootout (The Brilliant Inventions)
- 2008 Best Local Musical Act from Creative Loafing (The Brilliant Inventions)
- 2009 Falcon Ridge Folk Festival Emerging Artist Award (The Brilliant Inventions)
- 2011 New Folk Finalist at the Kerrville Folk Festival
- 2013 First Place Winner (country) of the Chris Austin Songwriting Contest at MerleFest.
- 2013 Winner Eddie Owen Presents Songwriter Shootout
- 2014 Top 5 Most Added Record on the Americana Internet Radio Chart
