= Inside Wants Out =

EP by John Mayer
- Released: September 1999
- Studio: Orphan Studios (Atlanta, Georgia); Southern Living at Its Finest (Atlanta, Georgia); Studio 737 (Boston, Massachusetts)
- Genre: Folk rock; acoustic rock; blue-eyed soul
- Length: 34:36
- Label: Mayer Music, LLC; Columbia
- Producer: John Mayer; Glenn Matullo; David LaBruyere

John Mayer chronology
Inside Wants Out (1999)	Room for Squares (2001)

Inside Wants Out is the debut EP by American singer-songwriter John Mayer. Released by Mayer Music in 1999, the album was later re-released by Columbia Records on August 2, 2002, with the omission of "Neon 12:47 AM". Basic tracks were to be recorded at Full Moon Studio in Athens, Georgia. The songs "Back to You", "No Such Thing", "My Stupid Mouth", and "Neon" were later re-recorded for Mayer's 2001 full-length debut album Room for Squares.

== Production and history ==
Mayer enrolled in the Berklee College of Music in Boston, Massachusetts, at the age of nineteen. After two semesters, he chose to cut his studies short, and at the urging of his college friend and Atlanta native, Clay Cook, the two moved to Atlanta, Georgia. Quickly making a name for their two-man band, LoFi Masters, they began their career in earnest there, frequenting the local coffee house and club circuit in venues like Eddie's Attic. Cook has said, however, that they began to experience musical differences due to Mayer's desire to take the duo in more of a pop direction. The two parted ways, and Mayer embarked on a solo career.

With the help of local producer and engineer Glenn Matullo, Mayer recorded the independent EP Inside Wants Out. Cook is also cited as the co-writer of four of the songs from the EP, most notably, Mayer's first commercial single release, "No Such Thing". The EP includes eight songs, all with Mayer on lead vocals and guitars, with the exception of "Comfortable" in which Mayer only recorded the vocals. For the opening track, "Back to You", a full band was enlisted, including the EP's co-producer David "DeLa" LaBruyere on bass guitars. Mayer and LaBruyere then began to tour throughout Georgia and the surrounding states.

== Reception ==
Critical response to Inside Wants Out, which came mostly after the Columbia re-release, was warm and optimistic. David Thigpen (with Rolling Stone) called the album's sound "curving melodically rich tunes that weave folk, blues, rock and wisps of jazz [and] place him in the company of David Gray and Jeff Buckley, minus the melancholy." Gavin Edwards gave the album three out of five stars and said, "Mayer's gift for melody was already in full effect on this record."

Professional ratings
Review scores
Source	Rating
Allmusic	3/5 stars
Melodic.net	3.5/5 stars
Rolling Stone	3/5 stars

== Track listing ==
No.	Title	Writer(s)	Length
1.	"Back to You"	John Mayer	4:00
2.	"No Such Thing"	Mayer, Clay Cook	3:51
3.	"My Stupid Mouth"	Mayer	4:16
4.	"Neon"	Mayer, Cook	3:56
5.	"Victoria"	Mayer	3:49
6.	"Love Soon"	Mayer, Cook	3:39
7.	"Comfortable"	Mayer, Cook	5:00
8.	"Neon 12:47 AM"	Mayer, Cook	2:36
9.	"Quiet"	Mayer	3:20
Total length:			34:27

== Personnel ==
Musicians

- John Mayer – vocals, guitars, string arrangements on track 7, production
- David LaBruyere – bass guitar on tracks 1 and 5, drum loop and Moog bass on track 1, production on tracks 1 and 8
- Matt Mangano – bass guitar on tracks 7 and 8, recording on track 7
- Stephen Roberson – drums on tracks 7 and 8
- Sigurdur Birkis – drums on track 1
- Clay Cook – guitar, backing vocals and string arrangements on track 7
- Casey Driessen – strings on track 7
- Carrie Rodriguez – strings on track 7
- Daniel Cho – strings on track 7

Production personnel

- Glenn Matullo – recording on all tracks except 7, production, mastering
- Russ Fowler – mixing
- Vlado Miller – resequencing

Additional personnel

- Tom Wages – cover and additional photography
- Tyson Marsh – additional photography
- Carol Farrar Norton – graphic design
