= Why Georgia =

2003 single by John Mayer

Single by John Mayer

from the album Room for Squares
- B-side: "3x5" (live); "No Such Thing" (demo)
- Released: January 21, 2003
- Length: 4:28
- Label: Columbia; Aware
- Songwriter: John Mayer
- Producer: John Alagia

John Mayer singles chronology
| "Your Body Is a Wonderland" (2002) | "Why Georgia" (2003) | "Bigger than My Body" (2003) |

"Why Georgia" is a song by American singer-songwriter John Mayer from his first album, Room for Squares (2001). As a B-side, the Australian CD single features the live version of "Why Georgia" as it appeared on Mayer's first live album, Any Given Thursday, as the single followed the live album's release. "Why Georgia" was released as the third single from Room for Squares in January 2003.

== Lyrics ==
The song is autobiographic, and touches on Mayer's experience of having a "quarterlife crisis", a phenomenon of 20-somethings. He moved to Atlanta with Clay Cook after dropping out of Berklee College of Music, and, though pursuing his dreams, had doubts if he would be successful or not. In one interview he said

I remember getting into some pretty dismal places money-wise and opportunity-wise. I kind of looked at my guitar and said, 'It's just you and me. I'll go where you take me.'

== Response ==
Rolling Stone magazine said that the song "lifts into a melodic chorus you won't soon forget". Stylus magazine praised "Why Georgia," saying of the single, "pure pop guitar lines resonate." PopMatters bemoaned that on songs like "Why Georgia", Mayer sounds just like Dave Matthews.

== Track listings ==
All songs by John Mayer unless otherwise indicated.

US version

1. "Why Georgia" – 4:28
2. "3x5" (Live at the X Lounge) – 5:18
3. "No Such Thing" (demo version) (John Mayer, Clay Cook) – 3:51

International version

1. "Why Georgia" – 4:28
2. "3x5" (live at the X Lounge)(feat. Brad Paisley) – 5:18
3. "No Such Thing" (demo version) (Mayer, Cook) – 3:51
4. "Why Georgia" (Any Given Thursday version) – 6:51

== Personnel ==
- John Mayer — vocals, guitar
- David LaBruyere — bass
- Nir Z — drums, loops
- Brandon Bush — Hammond organ
- John Alagia — percussion
- Clay Cook — backing vocals
- Doug Derryberry — backing vocals

== Charts ==
=== Weekly charts ===
| Chart (2003) | Peak position |
|---|---|
| Australia (ARIA) | 81 |
| New Zealand (Recorded Music NZ) | 23 |
| US Bubbling Under Hot 100 (Billboard) | 2 |
| US Adult Alternative Airplay (Billboard) | 2 |
| US Adult Pop Airplay (Billboard) | 8 |

=== Year-end charts ===
| Chart (2003) | Position |
|---|---|
| US Adult Top 40 (Billboard) | 21 |
| US Triple-A (Billboard) | 4 |

== Certifications ==
| Region | Certification | Certified units/sales |
|---|---|---|
| Australia (ARIA) | Gold | 35,000^{‡} |
| New Zealand (RMNZ) | Gold | 15,000^{‡} |
| United States (RIAA) | Gold | 500,000^{‡} |
^{‡} Sales+streaming figures based on certification alone.

== Release history ==
| Region | Date | Format(s) | Label(s) | Ref. |
|---|---|---|---|---|
| United States | January 21, 2003 | Hot adult contemporary; triple A radio | Columbia; Aware | |
| United States | February 17, 2003 | Adult contemporary radio | Columbia; Aware | |
| United States | March 31, 2003 | Contemporary hit radio | Columbia; Aware | |
| Australia | June 23, 2003 | CD | Columbia; Aware | |

== Cover versions ==
In 2004, saxophonist Gerald Albright covered the song from the album "Kickin' It Up".
