= Your Body Is a Wonderland =

2002 single by John Mayer

Single by John Mayer

from the album Room for Squares
- B-side: "No Such Thing" (acoustic); "Your Body Is a Wonderland" (acoustic); "Not Myself" (demo)
- Released: June 3, 2002
- Genre: Soft rock; bedroom pop
- Length: 4:09 (album version); 3:46 (radio edit)
- Label: Columbia; Aware
- Songwriter: John Mayer
- Producer: John Alagía

John Mayer singles chronology
"No Such Thing" (2001)	"Your Body Is a Wonderland" (2002)	"Why Georgia" (2003)

"Your Body Is a Wonderland" is a song written and performed by American singer-songwriter John Mayer. It was released on June 3, 2002, as the second single from his debut studio album, Room for Squares (2001). It reached number 18 on the US Billboard Hot 100 and number nine on the New Zealand Singles Chart.

== Background ==
During his VH1 Storytellers performance, Mayer stated that he wrote the song about his first girlfriend at age 14. The song was actually named "Strawberry Wonderland" but was later changed by Mayer.

There has been speculation that Mayer wrote the song about Jennifer Love Hewitt, whom he dated in 2002, but she denied it. Hewitt told Entertainment Weekly, "My body is far from a wonderland. My body is more like a pawnshop. There's a lot of interesting things put together, and if you look closely you'd probably be excited, but at first glance, not so much".

== Critical reception ==
Billboard said the song showcases Mayer's "smooth, casual singing style and barroom instrumentation." In 2003, "Your Body Is a Wonderland" won Mayer the Grammy Award for Best Male Pop Vocal Performance. Conversely, the song ranked at No. 28 on Blender magazine's list of the "50 Worst Songs Ever" in 2010.

== Music video ==
The video starred the actress Holly Lynch. The video was directed by Jim Gable, and edited by Scott C. Wilson.

== Track listing ==
All songs are written by John Mayer except where noted otherwise.

1. "Your Body Is a Wonderland" – 4:09
2. "No Such Thing" (Acoustic version, live from WXPN) (John Mayer & Clay Cook) – 3:46
3. "Your Body Is a Wonderland" (acoustic version, live from WXPN) – 5:46
4. "Not Myself" (demo version) – 4:05

== Personnel ==
- John Mayer – vocals, guitar, toy piano, vibraphone, Korg Triton
- David LaBruyere – bass
- Nir Z – drums
- Brandon Bush – Wurlitzer electric piano
- John Alagia – percussion, Hammond organ
- Chris Fischer – congas

== Charts ==
=== Weekly charts ===
Chart (2002–2003)	Peak position
Australia (ARIA)	23
Austria (Ö3 Austria Top 40)	48
Canada CHR (Nielsen BDS)	7
Germany (GfK)	51
New Zealand (Recorded Music NZ)	9
US Billboard Hot 100	18
US Adult Alternative Airplay (Billboard)	1
US Adult Contemporary (Billboard)	17
US Adult Pop Airplay (Billboard)	3
US Pop Airplay (Billboard)	15

=== Year-end charts ===
Chart (2002)	Position
US Adult Top 40 (Billboard)	33
US Triple-A (Billboard)	6

Chart (2003)	Position
Australia (ARIA)	90
US Billboard Hot 100	48
US Adult Contemporary (Billboard)	32
US Adult Top 40 (Billboard)	7
US Mainstream Top 40 (Billboard)	44

== Certifications ==
Region	Certification	Certified units/sales
Australia (ARIA)	3× Platinum	210,000^{‡}
Denmark (IFPI Danmark)	Platinum	90,000^{‡}
New Zealand (RMNZ)	3× Platinum	90,000^{‡}
Spain (Promusicae)	Gold	30,000^{‡}
United Kingdom (BPI)	Silver	200,000^{‡}
United States (RIAA)	2× Platinum	2,000,000^{‡}
^{‡} Sales+streaming figures based on certification alone.

== Release history ==
Region	Date	Format(s)	Label(s)	Ref(s).
United States	June 3, 2002	Triple A radio	Columbia; Aware	
United States	August 19, 2002	Hot adult contemporary radio	Columbia; Aware	
United States	September 16, 2002	Contemporary hit radio	Columbia; Aware	
Australia	November 25, 2002	CD	Columbia; Aware	
Europe	January 17, 2003	CD	Columbia; Aware	
Italy	January 24, 2003	CD	Columbia; Aware	
Denmark	January 27, 2003	CD	Columbia; Aware	

== Other versions ==
In 2025, American musician and comedian Neil Cicierega released a remix of the song, titled "Porcelain". The accompanying music video splices clips of Mayer performing live with imagery of porcelain dolls and bubble gum.

== Appearances in the media ==
In 2006, the song was used in an episode of U.S. version of The Office, entitled "A Benihana Christmas". Characters Michael Scott and Andy Bernard sing the song as a karaoke duet. Mayer agreed to let the show use the song, in exchange for a Dundie, which was for "Tallest Music Dude".
