= The Hogwaller Ramblers =

Alt-country/Americana band from Virginia, US

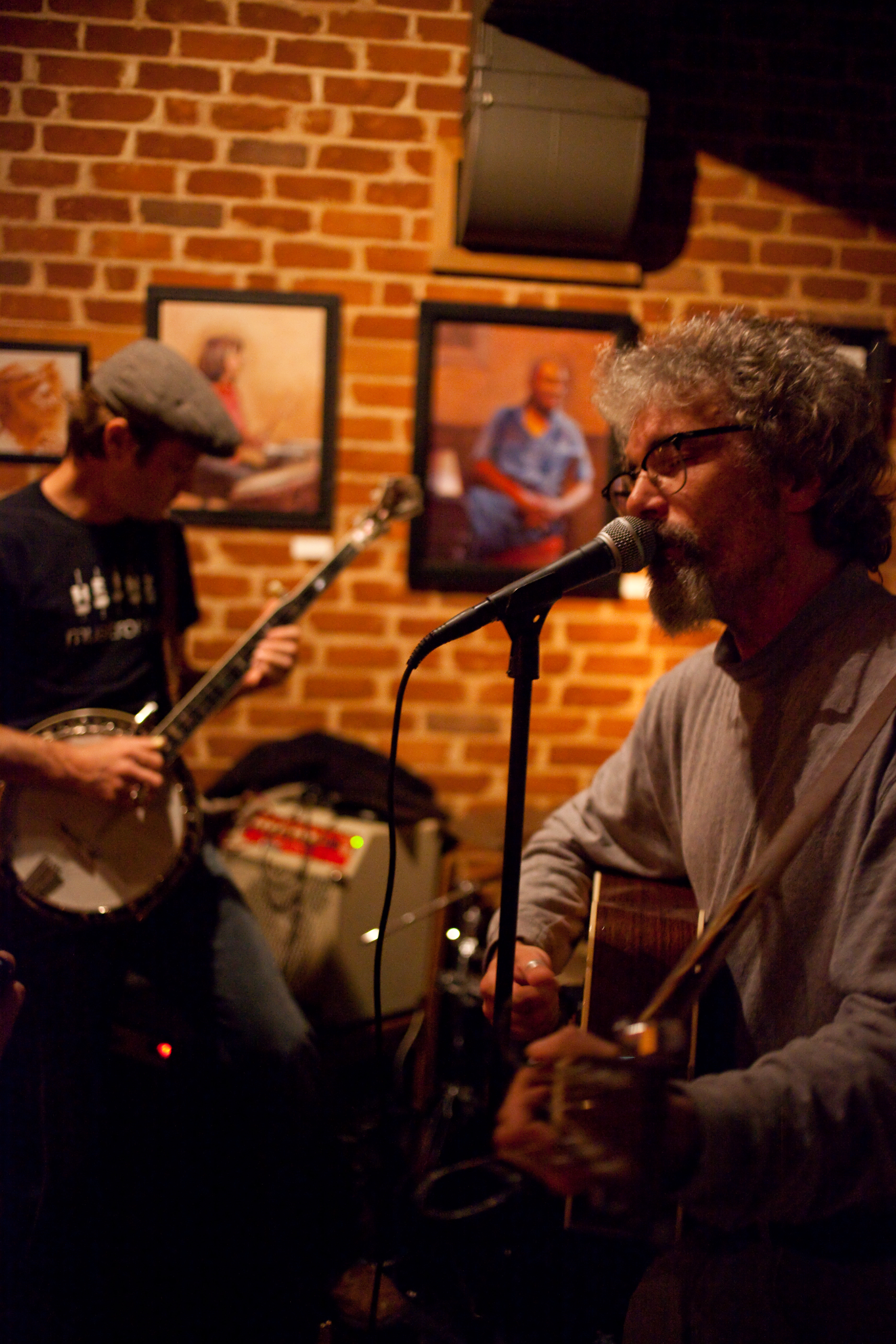
Appearing at Fellini's No. 9 restaurant in Charlottesville, Virginia on November 16, 2009: Jimmy Stelling on banjo (left), Jamie Dyer on guitar (right)

The Hogwaller Ramblers are an alt-country/Americana band from Charlottesville, Virginia, USA. Their style of music has been dubbed "Bluegrock". The group's line-up has changed over the years since they started playing as a street band in Charlottesville in 1991.

The only original member is frontman Jamie Dyer (Lead Vocals, rhythm guitar). The founding four Hogwaller Ramblers (David Goldstein (accordion and vocals), Rick Jones (bass and vocals), David Wellbeloved (drums, slide guitar, and vocals), and Jamie Dyer) only played together for the first few years of the band's existence. Dozens of musicians have been members of the band. Currently, this includes long-time members Sandy Gray (lead guitar), Bud Bryant (bass) and Cristan Keighley (drums), who is back after a hiatus.

Former members include: Jimmy Stelling (banjo), Dan Sebring (fiddle and bass), Thomas Bailey (bass, mandolin, guitar, and vocals), and Jeff Romano (harmonica).

The band's name refers to a section of Charlottesville where the stockyards used to be located, giving rise to the epithet "Hogwaller."
