= Gareth Asher and the Earthlings =

American country and folk rock band

- Born: August 20, 1980; Atlanta, Georgia, the United States
- Genres: Southern soul, folk rock, blues, pop rock
- Years active: 2002–present
- Labels: Southern
- Members: Gareth Asher - Vocals/Acoustic Guitar, Piano; Joshua Huff - Vocals/Electric Guitar; Will Boos - Bass; Terry Dillard - Drums; Grant Reynolds - Keys and Steel
- Website: garethasher.com

Gareth Asher and the Earthlings are an Atlanta, Georgia-based country and folk rock band formed by Georgia-born singer-songwriter and guitarist Gareth Asher in 2011, initially under the name Gareth Asher and the Infantry. Asher is an American singer-songwriter and guitarist and son of musical parents. After releasing a solo CD in 2004 and teaming with vocalist Joshua Huff in the band Illbreak in 2005 to release a CD, followed by an album under his own name 2007, Asher assembled what was to become the Earthlings and recorded his best-selling album to date in 2010. Using revenues from a successful Kickstarter project concluded June, 2011, Gareth and the Earthlings toured venues throughout the Southeastern United States in 2011.

The first public appearance of the band under the name Gareth Asher and the Earthlings was at The Park Tavern in Piedmont Park, Atlanta, Georgia, on June 16, 2012.

Gareth Asher and the Earthlings have appeared at venues throughout Georgia, Florida, and the Carolinas. Asher was named Musician of the Year at the Atlanta Chozen Awards in 2010. The band's music and lyrics are written by Gareth Asher, although they frequently cover other artists in the Southern Soul genre.

== Musical style ==
Asher is notably terse in comments about his personal life. For examples, see his Str8tshootermusic and Atlanta Music Guide. However, in an interview with When We Speak TV he discusses his musical influences and interests.

In this interview, Asher credits his interest in music to having grown up in an atmosphere of rock and funk music -- Jackson Browne in particular. He credits the honing of his vocal talents to Jan Smith, coach for Rob Thomas of [Matchbox 20] and [Usher]. The Earthlings' style, identified as Southern Soul, has been connected with outstanding examples of that genre. Asher readily expresses his admiration for the pop/rock tradition connected with other Georgia natives Ray Charles and James Brown.

In comments likening Asher's voice to that of famed tenors such as Jeff Buckley, Ray Lamontagne, and even Cat Stevens, record and session producer Charlie Peacock describes Gareth Asher and the Earthlings as "solid in all the ways we need a decidedly American singer-songwriter to be. What do you get? To begin with there’s loopy grooves, big wide tambourines, and a by- the-book folky, rock mix. All the usual Americana instruments are up front and in the shadows: Acoustic guitars, B3, Wurlitzer electric piano, drums, bass, and electrics." Peacock adds "I like this. Good job. But that doesn’t matter much. What I hear is that the femmes really like them some Gareth. Who needs one reviewer in your court when you’ve got 3.5 Billion females on your side? Carry on Gareth. Carry on."

== Performances Gareth Asher songs ==
- Asher's song “Back to Myself” was featured on a Crazy 8 Promotions’ compilation release (February 2002) of eight different artists, primarily from the Atlanta area.
- Gareth Asher was also selected to perform in the 2002, 2003, and 2004 Atlantis Music Conference.
- As part of a tour financed by a successful Kickstarter project, Gareth Asher and the Earthlings played across the United States and massively expanded his fan base. As a gift to his contributors, the band gave a song to those who donated.
- At the 2009 Hotel Carolina event, held September 25 and 26, Asher played on Saturday night alongside performers Matt Duke, Jay Nash, Sarah Haze, Tony Lucca, Benjy Davis Project and Tyrone Wells.
- Performance of Get it right, a collaboration with alternative Southern rap quartet Nappy Roots in 2011 for a combination of Southern Soul and hip-hop as a call for social change posted on the GetItRight site and YouTube.
- Eight of the tracks from Between the Smiles and the Tears are used in the soundtrack for Painting in the Rain, a 2011 movie produced and directed by independent film-maker Shayde Christian.

== Discography ==
=== No Reality ===
Released 2004 by Gareth Asher and the Infantry. ROVI MUSIC ID MW0001714458, AMG POP ID R 1517922. Recorded in Atlanta, the album was produced by Asher's close friend Clay Cook of the Marshall Tucker Band and Zac Brown Band.

1. Got Me Gone 3:48
2. Remember Me 4:08
3. Simple Things 3:17
4. Brainstorm 5:42
5. Feel Like Falling 4:12
6. One of Those Times 3:25
7. Real Part of You 5:09
8. No Surprises 4:08
9. Would It Be So Bad 3:38
10. Hold On 3:29
11. Pink Houses in Heaven 3:56

=== The Flood (Recorded as Illbreak) ===
Released 2005. A recording made under the label of Todd Hirsch (formerly of Three Doors Down). Gareth Asher and band member Joshua Huff appear on this CD.

=== I'm The Earth ===
Released 2008, all music and lyrics by Gareth Asher

1. Intro 0:41
2. My Love 5:11
3. Crave 4:23
4. Maybe Things Would Be Different 4:46
5. Call Me Out 2:52
6. Bathe Me in Failure 4:37
7. Enchanted 4:44
8. Nothing But Sunshine 3:40
9. A Spark 3:35
10. Something That You Do 4:23
11. The Right Time (Honeygirl) 4:50
12. The Highest High 9:24

=== Between the Smiles and Tears ===
Released April 2010. This album fills out the definition of Southern soul by combining electric guitars, percussion and string arrangements by members of the Atlanta Symphony Orchestra. Recorded in Atlanta with Clay Cook as producer.

1. Can We Get It Right 3:18
2. I Keep Telling Myself 4:10
3. Be the One for You 3:49
4. I'm Not Worried About It 4:37
5. Break 5:05
6. Singin' Man 3:21
7. Somewhere South of Here 5:08
8. On My Own 4:05
9. I Keep Telling Myself 4:46

=== Singles ===
- "One Day"
- Better Days

== Awards and nominations ==
- 2009-2010 CHOZEN AWARDS co-winner Musician of the Year award, March 24, 2010, in a tie with Belinda Munro. The announcement of the Chozen awards for 2010 and Asher's acceptance comments may be viewed on YouTube.
