= Room for Squares =

2001 studio album by John Mayer

Studio album by John Mayer
- Released: June 5, 2001
- Recorded: October 2000 – January 2001
- Studios: Loho (New York, NY); Sunny Acre (Easton, MD); 33 & 1/3 (Brooklyn, NY)
- Genres: Soft rock; acoustic
- Length: 54:14
- Labels: Aware; Columbia
- Producer: John Alagia

John Mayer chronology
| Inside Wants Out (1999) | Room for Squares (2001) | Heavier Things (2003) |

Singles from Room for Squares
- 1. "No Such Thing" Released: June 4, 2001; 2. "Your Body Is a Wonderland" Released: June 3, 2002; 3. "Why Georgia" Released: January 21, 2003

Room for Squares is the debut studio album by American singer-songwriter and guitarist John Mayer, originally released on June 5, 2001, and re-released on September 18, 2001, by both Aware and Columbia Records. Upon its release, it peaked at number 8 on the US Billboard 200 and received generally positive reviews from critics. It earned Mayer a Grammy Award for Best Male Pop Vocal Performance for the single "Your Body Is a Wonderland".

Room for Squares is Mayer's best-selling album to date, having sold over 5,485,000 copies in the United States as of 2026.

== Background ==
The album's title is a reference to jazz artist Hank Mobley's 1963 album No Room for Squares. All songs from the album are written by Mayer; three songs, "No Such Thing", "Neon", and "Love Song for No One", were co-written with Clay Cook. The first two of these, along with "My Stupid Mouth" and "Back to You", originally appeared on Mayer's 1999 EP Inside Wants Out. The songs are largely based on Mayer's personal experiences.

Through constant shows, including in the Atlanta-area Eddie's Attic, Mayer's reputation began to build. In March, an acquaintance of Mayer's, a lawyer, sent an EP to Gregg Latterman at Aware Records. After including him in the Aware Festival concerts and having his songs included on Aware compilations, in early 2001, Aware released Room for Squares as an internet-only album. During that time, Aware signed a deal with Columbia Records that gave Columbia first pick in signing Aware artists, and so in September 2001, Columbia remixed and re-released Room for Squares. As part of the major label "debut", the album's artwork was updated, and the track "3x5" was added, which did not appear on the original as the recording was not yet complete at the time. The re-release included reworked studio versions of the first four songs from his indie album, Inside Wants Out. The cover art for the most recent release of Room for Squares features a periodic table design beginning from the back cover which continues to the front cover, ending at the right-side.

The album was relatively unknown at its time of release, but it became more well known through word of mouth and John's touring, and reached number one Billboard's Heatseekers chart by March 2002. By the end of that year, Room for Squares had spawned several radio hits, including "No Such Thing", "Your Body Is a Wonderland", and ultimately, "Why Georgia" (a radio-only single).

== Reception ==
Professional ratings
Review scores
| Source | Rating |
|---|---|
| AllMusic | 4/5 stars |
| Blender | 3/5 stars |
| The Boston Phoenix | 3/4 stars |
| Christgau's Consumer Guide | (1-star Honorable Mention) |
| Now | 4/5 |
| Pitchfork | 7.8/10 |
| Rolling Stone | 4/5 stars |
| The Rolling Stone Album Guide | 3.5/5 stars |
| Slant Magazine | 4/5 stars |
| Stylus Magazine | B |

By April 2002, Room for Squares had seen increases in eight of the previous nine weeks, earning the Billboard 200's Greatest Gainer (from number 82 to 56)—a 36 percent surge. The increase was attributed to combination of a March performance of The Tonight Show with Jay Leno and the radio-and-retail campaign launched in more than 10 markets where Mayer was receiving airplay. It reached number seven on Billboard's Top Pop Catalog. A steady seller, the album was certified platinum despite never being a top-ten hit.

Anthony DeCurtis for Rolling Stone gave the album four out of five stars, calling it "irresistible". PopMatters gave an unfavorable review, saying "It doesn't offend, nor does it attempt to make itself too exciting for the most part." Robert Christgau said that composition lyrics like "She keeps a toothbrush at my place/As if I had the extra space" on "City Love" are an improvement over Norah Jones.

By the end of 2002, Room for Squares had spawned several radio hits, including, "No Such Thing", "Your Body Is a Wonderland", and, ultimately, "Why Georgia", which was released as a CD single six weeks before the follow-up album, Heavier Things, was released in 2003.

In 2003, Mayer won a Grammy for Best Male Pop Vocal Performance for "Your Body Is a Wonderland". In his acceptance speech he remarked, “This is very, very fast, and I promise to catch up.” He referred to himself as being sixteen, a remark that many mistook to mean that he was only sixteen years old at the time.

== Track listings ==
All tracks are written by John Mayer, except where noted.

Original version (AWA 110)
| No. | Title | Writer(s) | Length |
|---|---|---|---|
| 1. | "No Such Thing" | Mayer, Clay Cook | 3:51 |
| 2. | "Why Georgia" | | 4:30 |
| 3. | "My Stupid Mouth" | | 3:47 |
| 4. | "Your Body Is a Wonderland" | | 4:08 |
| 5. | "Neon" | Mayer, Cook | 4:23 |
| 6. | "City Love" | | 4:03 |
| 7. | "83" | | 4:55 |
| 8. | "Love Song for No One" | Mayer, Cook | 3:24 |
| 9. | "Back to You" | | 4:04 |
| 10. | "Great Indoors" | | 3:36 |
| 11. | "Not Myself" | | 3:39 |
| 12. | "St. Patrick's Day" | | 5:20 |
| Total length: | | | 49:47 |

Columbia re-release (CK 85293)
| No. | Title | Writer(s) | Length |
|---|---|---|---|
| 1. | "No Such Thing" | Mayer, Cook | 3:51 |
| 2. | "Why Georgia" | | 4:28 |
| 3. | "My Stupid Mouth" | | 3:45 |
| 4. | "Your Body Is a Wonderland" | | 4:09 |
| 5. | "Neon" | Mayer, Cook | 4:22 |
| 6. | "City Love" | | 4:00 |
| 7. | "83" | | 4:50 |
| 8. | "3×5" | | 4:50 |
| 9. | "Love Song for No One" | Mayer, Cook | 3:21 |
| 10. | "Back to You" | | 4:01 |
| 11. | "Great Indoors" | | 3:36 |
| 12. | "Not Myself" | | 3:40 |
| 13. | "St. Patrick's Day" | | 5:21 |
| Total length: | | | 54:19 |

Note: On the Columbia re-release, "St. Patrick's Day" is consistently listed as track 14; track 13 is an unlisted song with a duration of 0:04, and sometimes even 0:00. And on the Columbia re-released version, the drum has been removed, but on the Aware Records version the drum is present through the entire song.

United States Columbia bonus disc with VCD bonus video (An Intimate Session With John Mayer)
| No. | Title | Length |
|---|---|---|
| 1. | "EPK An Intimate Session with John Mayer (video)" | 6:15 |
| 2. | "Back to You" (acoustic) |
| 3. | "No Such Thing" (acoustic) |
| 4. | "Lenny" (live) |
| 5. | "The Wind Cries Mary" (The Jimi Hendrix Experience cover live at the X Lounge) |

== Alternative covers ==
The album's cover for its initially planned June 2001 release in the United States and its Japan release had alternative covers.

Original release cover art

Japanese release cover art

Additionally the main album cover had a single dividing line changed between releases.

Askew line pictured left

== Personnel ==
All track numbers correlate with those on the Columbia release of the album.

=== Musicians ===
- John Mayer – vocals; guitars; Korg Triton synthesizer on tracks 1, 4, 7, 10 and 11; Omnichord on track 1, 5, 10 and 12; toy piano and vibraphone on track 4; vibraslap on track 7; piano on track 8; percussion on track 11
- David LaBruyere – bass guitar on all tracks
- Nir Z – drums on tracks 1, 2, 3, 4, 5, 7, 9, 10, 11, 12 and 14, loops on tracks 2 and 5, percussion on track 6
- Brandon Bush – Hammond organ on tracks 1, 2, 3, 7, 9 and 14; Wurlitzer electric piano on tracks 1, 4 and 9; Rhodes piano on tracks 5 and 14; Mellotron on tracks 12 and 14
- John Alagia – percussion on track 1, 2, 3, 4, 5, 8 and 9; guitar on tracks 5 and 9; Hammond organ on track 4 and 6; Wurlitzer electric piano on track 6; jingle bells on track 14; production; mixing on tracks 2, 5, 6, 11, 12 and 14; engineering
- Clay Cook – backing vocals on tracks 2, 5 and 9
- Doug Derryberry – backing vocals on tracks 2, 5 and 9
- Chris Fischer – congas on track 4
- Carole Rabinowitz – cello on track 6
- Jon Catchings – cello on track 6
- Kristin Wilkinson – viola on track 6
- David Angell – violin on track 6
- David Davidson – violin on track 6
- Jerry Marotta – drums on track 8

=== Production ===
- Jack Joseph Puig – mixing on tracks 1, 3, 4, 7, 8, 9 and 10
- Jeff Juliano – mixing on tracks 2, 5, 6, 11, 12 and 14; engineering; Pro Tools engineering
- Scott Hull – mastering
- John Mark Painter – strings arrangements
- Greg Di Gesu – assistant engineer
- Dan Fallon – artwork
- Alex Fallon – artwork
- Joshua Kessler – photography (Columbia release)

== Charts ==
=== Weekly charts ===
Weekly chart performance for Room for Squares
| Chart (2001–2003) | Peak position |
|---|---|
| Australian Albums (ARIA) | 5 |
| Canadian Albums (Billboard) | 9 |
| German Albums (Offizielle Top 100) | 55 |
| New Zealand Albums (RMNZ) | 6 |
| UK Albums (Official Charts) | 128 |
| US Billboard 200 | 8 |

=== Year-end charts ===
Year-end chart performance for Room for Squares
| Chart (2002) | Position |
|---|---|
| Canadian Albums (Nielsen SoundScan) | 145 |
| Canadian Alternative Albums (Nielsen SoundScan) | 48 |
| US Billboard 200 | 41 |
| Worldwide Albums (IFPI) | 40 |

| Chart (2003) | Position |
|---|---|
| Australian Albums (ARIA) | 29 |
| New Zealand Albums (RMNZ) | 25 |
| US Billboard 200 | 32 |

=== Decade-end charts ===
Decade-end chart performance for Room for Squares
| Chart (2000–2009) | Position |
|---|---|
| US Billboard 200 | 121 |

== Certifications ==
Certifications for Room for Squares
| Region | Certification | Certified units/sales |
|---|---|---|
| Australia (ARIA) | 3× Platinum | 210,000^{^} |
| Canada (Music Canada) | 2× Platinum | 200,000^{‡} |
| Denmark (IFPI Danmark) | 3× Platinum | 60,000^{‡} |
| New Zealand (RMNZ) | Platinum | 15,000^{^} |
| United Kingdom (BPI) | Silver | 60,000^{*} |
| United States (RIAA) | 5× Platinum | 5,000,000^{‡} |
^{*} Sales figures based on certification alone.^{^} Shipments figures based on certification alone.^{‡} Sales+streaming figures based on certification alone.
