= John Mayer =

American musician (born 1977)

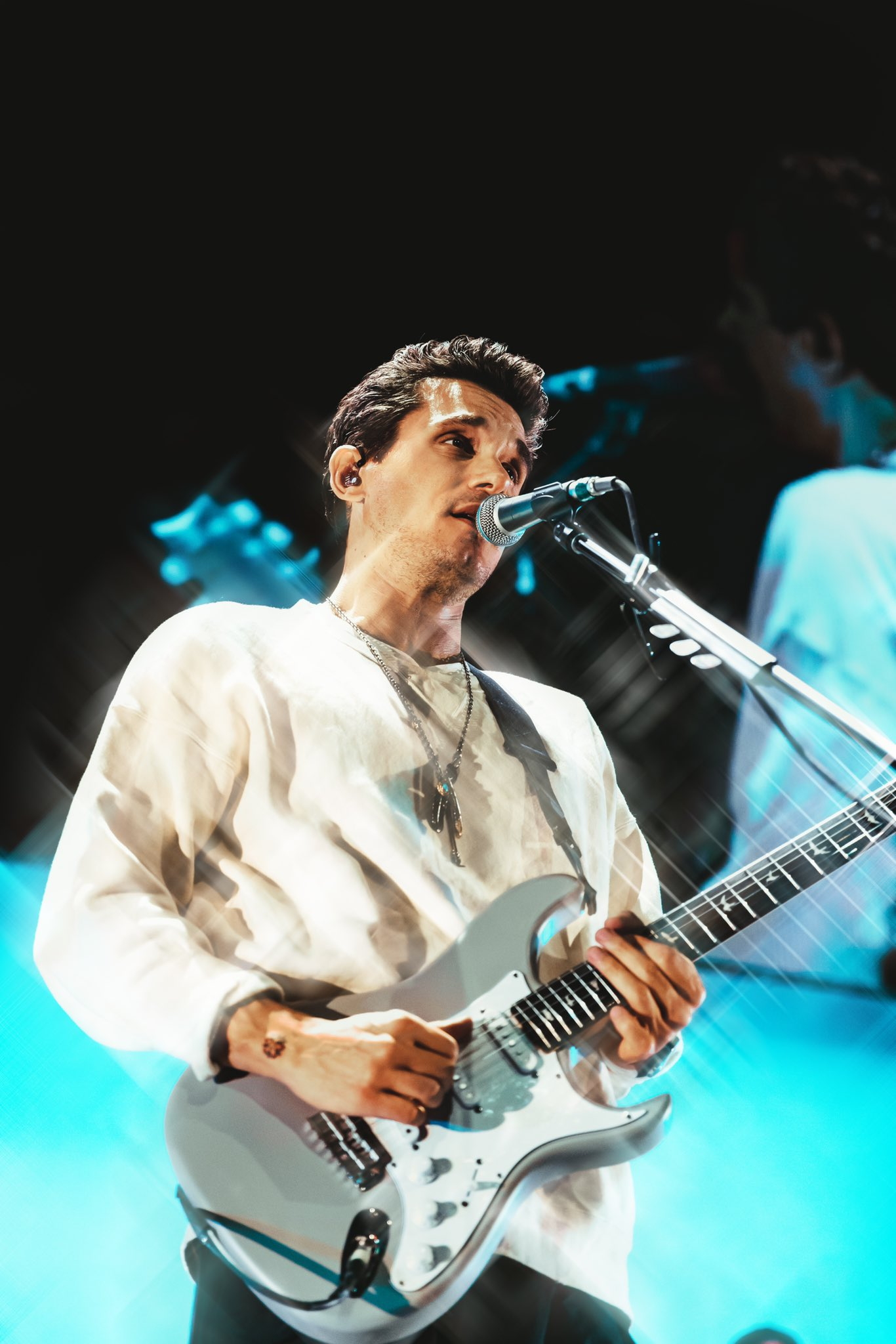
- Mayer performing in 2019

Background information
- Born: John Clayton Mayer; October 16, 1977 (age 49); Bridgeport, Connecticut, U.S.
- Origin: Atlanta, Georgia, U.S.
- Genres: Rock; pop; blues
- Occupations: Singer; songwriter; guitarist; record producer
- Instruments: Vocals; guitar; harmonica; keyboards
- Works: Discography; production
- Years active: 1998–present
- Labels: Aware; Columbia; The Orchard
- Member of: John Mayer Trio; Dead & Company
- Formerly of: Villanova Junction; Lo-Fi Masters
- Website: johnmayer.com

John Clayton Mayer (/ˈmeɪ.ər/ MAY-ər; born October 16, 1977) is an American singer, songwriter, and guitarist. He attended Berklee College of Music in Boston, but he left for Atlanta in 1997 with fellow guitarist Clay Cook, with whom he formed the short-lived rock duo Lo-Fi Masters. After their split, Mayer continued to play at local clubs, refining his skills and gaining a minor following. He performed at the 2000 South by Southwest festival, and was subsequently signed by Aware Records, an imprint of Columbia Records through which he released his debut extended play (EP), Inside Wants Out (1999). His first two studio albums—Room for Squares (2001) and Heavier Things (2003)—were both met with critical and commercial success. The former album spawned the single "Your Body Is a Wonderland", which won Best Male Pop Vocal Performance at the 45th Annual Grammy Awards, while the latter album peaked atop the Billboard 200.

By 2005, Mayer had moved away from the acoustic music that characterized his early records, and further delved into the blues and rock music that had originally influenced him. Forming the John Mayer Trio, he released the live album Try! (2005) and his third studio album, Continuum (2006). The latter was met with positive critical reception and was nominated for Album of the Year, and won both Best Pop Vocal Album and Best Male Pop Vocal Performance for its single "Waiting on the World to Change" at the 49th Annual Grammy Awards. It was followed by Battle Studies (2009), which marked his return to pop.

After having several controversial incidents with the media, Mayer withdrew from public life in 2010 and drew inspiration from the 1970s pop music of Laurel Canyon for the sound of his fifth studio album, Born and Raised (2012). Discovery of a granuloma on his vocal cords delayed the release of the album until May 2012, and forced him to cancel its accompanying tour. Despite favorable reception and becoming his second release to peak atop the Billboard 200, the album was less commercially successful than his previous work. Mayer recovered in January 2013 and released his sixth studio album, Paradise Valley in August of that year, which peaked at number two on the chart and incorporated country, folk, and Americana influences. His seventh album, The Search for Everything (2017) was a loose concept album based around themes of a romantic break-up. His eighth, Sob Rock (2021), was inspired by 1980s soft rock music. In 2023, Rolling Stone ranked Mayer at number 61 on "The 250 Greatest Guitarists of All Time" list.

Outside of his solo career, Mayer has produced and provided music for various artists spanning multiple genres, such as Frank Ocean, Kanye West, Travis Scott, Alicia Keys, Jack Harlow, Ed Sheeran, Shawn Mendes, Harry Styles, Daniel Caesar, Khalid, Jhené Aiko, Barbra Streisand, and Alex Warren, among others. In 2015, three former members of the Grateful Dead joined with Mayer and two other musicians to form the band Dead & Company. It was the latest of several reunions of the band's surviving members since Jerry Garcia's death in 1995. Mayer's secondary career pursuits extend to television hosting, comedy, and writing; he has authored columns for magazines such as Esquire. He supports various causes and has performed at charity benefits. He is a watch aficionado (with a collection he values in the "tens of millions" of dollars), contributing to the watch site Hodinkee, has been on the jury at the Grand Prix d'Horlogerie de Genève, and was appointed as the Creative Conduit of Audemars Piguet in 2024. By 2014, he had sold a total of over 20 million albums worldwide.

== Early life ==
John Clayton Mayer was born on October 16, 1977, in Bridgeport, Connecticut. His father, Richard Mayer, was principal at Central High School in Bridgeport, and his mother, Margaret (née Hoffman), was a middle-school English teacher. He grew up in nearby Fairfield, the middle child between older half-sister Rachel, older brother Carl, and younger brother Ben. His father is Jewish, and Mayer has said that he "relates" to Judaism. As an elementary school student, Mayer became close friends with future tennis star James Blake, and they played Nintendo games together weekday afternoons after school for three years. He attended the Center for Global Studies at Brien McMahon High School in Norwalk for his junior year (then known as the Center for Japanese Studies Abroad, a magnet program for learning Japanese).

After watching Michael J. Fox's guitar performance as Marty McFly in Back to the Future, Mayer became fascinated with the instrument. When he turned 13 years old, his father rented one for him. A neighbor gave Mayer a Stevie Ray Vaughan cassette, which cultivated Mayer's love of blues music. According to Mayer, his fascination with Vaughan started a "genealogical hunt" that led him to other blues guitarists, including Buddy Guy, B.B. King, Freddie King, Albert King, Otis Rush, and Lightnin' Hopkins. Mayer started taking lessons from a local guitar shop owner, Al Ferrante, and soon became consumed. His singular focus concerned his parents, and they twice took him to see a psychiatrist, who determined him to be healthy. Mayer says that his parents' contentious marriage led him to "disappear and create my own world I could believe in". After two years of practice, he started playing at bars and other venues, while still in high school. In addition to performing solo, he was a member of a band called Villanova Junction (named for a Jimi Hendrix song) with Tim Procaccini, Joe Beleznay, and Rich Wolf.

When Mayer was 17, he was stricken with cardiac dysrhythmia and was hospitalized for a weekend. Reflecting on the incident, Mayer said, "That was the moment the songwriter in me was born", and he penned his first lyrics the night he left the hospital. Shortly thereafter, he began suffering from panic attacks, and says he feared having to enter a mental institution. He continues to manage such episodes with anti-anxiety medication.

== Career ==
=== Early career (1996–1999) ===
Mayer considered skipping college to pursue music, but his parents dissuaded him. He enrolled at the Berklee College of Music in 1997 at age 19. At the urging of his college friend Clay Cook, they left Berklee after two semesters and moved to Atlanta; there, they formed a two-man band called LoFi Masters, and began performing in local coffee houses and club venues such as Eddie's Attic. According to Cook, they experienced musical differences due to Mayer's desire to move more towards pop music. The two parted ways and Mayer embarked on a solo career.

With the help of local producer and engineer Glenn Matullo, Mayer recorded the independent EP Inside Wants Out. The EP includes eight songs with Mayer on lead vocals and guitars. For the opening track, "Back To You", a full band was enlisted, including the EP's co-producer David "DeLa" LaBruyere on bass guitars. Cook had co-written many of the album's songs, including its first commercial single release, "No Such Thing"; however, his only performance contribution was backing vocals on the song "Comfortable".

=== Major label and commercial success (2000–2004) ===
Mayer and LaBruyere performed throughout Georgia and nearby states. Also, as his career coincided with the then-nascent internet music market, Mayer benefited from an online following. Mayer came to the attention of Gregg Latterman at Aware Records through an acquaintance of Mayer's, a lawyer, who sent Aware his EP. In early 2001, after including him in Aware Festival concerts and his songs on Aware compilations, Aware released Mayer's internet-only album, Room for Squares. During this time, Aware concluded a deal with Columbia Records that gave Columbia first pick in signing Aware artists. In September, Columbia remixed and re-released Room for Squares. As part of the major label "debut", the album's artwork was updated, and the track "3x5" was added. The re-release included reworked studio versions of the first four songs from Inside Wants Out.

By the end of 2002, Room for Squares had spawned several radio hits, including "No Such Thing", "Your Body Is a Wonderland", and "Why Georgia". It also received general praise critically, and Mayer drew comparisons to Dave Matthews. In 2003, Mayer won a Grammy for Best Male Pop Vocal Performance for "Your Body Is a Wonderland". In his acceptance speech he remarked, "This is very, very fast, and I promise to catch up." He also figuratively referred to himself as being 16, a remark that many mistook to mean that he was 16 years old at the time.

In February 2003, Mayer released a live CD and DVD of a concert in Birmingham, Alabama titled Any Given Thursday, which included songs previously not recorded, such as "Man on the Side", "Something's Missing", and "Covered in Rain". Commercially, the album peaked at number 17 on the Billboard 200 chart. Its accompanying DVD release received conservative—although consistent—praise, with critics torn between his pop-idol image, and (at the time) emerging guitar prowess. Erik Crawford of AllMusic asked, "Is [Mayer] the consummate guitar hero exemplified when he plays a cover of Stevie Ray Vaughan's 'Lenny', or is he the teen idol that the pubescent girls shriek for after he plays 'Your Body Is a Wonderland'?" That summer, Mayer went on the road with Counting Crows in a tour that spanned 42 dates between July 7 and September 2.

Heavier Things, Mayer's second album, was released in 2003 to generally favorable reviews. Rolling Stone, Allmusic, and Blender all gave positive, although reserved, feedback. The album was commercially successful, and while it did not sell as well as Room for Squares, it peaked at number one on the US Billboard 200 chart. The song "Daughters" won the 2005 Grammy for Song of the Year, and reached No. 1 on the Billboard Adult Pop Songs chart and No. 19 on the Billboard Hot 100. He dedicated the award to his grandmother, Annie Hoffman, who had died in May 2004. He also won Best Male Pop Vocal Performance. On February 9, 2009, Mayer told Ellen DeGeneres that he thought he should not have won the Grammy for Song of the year because he thought that Alicia Keys' "If I Ain't Got You" was the better song. Because of this, he removed the top half of the Grammy and gave it to Keys, and kept the bottom part for himself. At the 37th Annual Songwriters Hall of Fame Induction Ceremony in 2006, Mayer received the Hal David Starlight Award.

Mayer again recorded live concerts across seven nights of his U.S. tour in 2004. These recordings were released to the iTunes Store under the title As/Is, indicating that the errors were included along with the good moments. A few months later, a "best of" CD was compiled from the As/Is nights. The album included a previously unreleased cover of Marvin Gaye's song "Inner City Blues (Make Me Wanna Holler)", featuring a solo from Mayer's supporting act—jazz and blues turntablist DJ Logic. The album covers of the As/Is releases feature drawings of anthropomorphic bunnies.

=== Change in musical direction (2005–2008) ===
As early as 2002, Chris Willman with Entertainment Weekly said that Mayer was "more historically savvy, and more ambitious than you'd guess from the unforced earnestness of [Room for] Squares". However, Mayer was largely associated with the Adult Contemporary and singer-songwriter genres. Fame allowed him access to his early influences, and he began collaborating with blues and jazz artists. He accompanied Buddy Guy in a concert at the Irving Plaza in December 2003. He toured with jazz pianist Herbie Hancock, including a show at the Bonnaroo Music Festival. He also performed on commercial releases, namely, with Eric Clapton (Back Home, Crossroads Guitar Festival), Buddy Guy (Bring 'Em In), John Scofield (That's What I Say), and B.B. King (80). Although Mayer maintained his reputation as a singer-songwriter, he gained distinction as a guitarist.

Following the conclusion of his Heavier Things tour, Mayer began working with artists, including those from other genres of music. His voice was sampled on the song "Go!" by rapper Common, and he appeared on a hidden track titled "Bittersweet Poetry" from the Kanye West album Graduation. The collaborations drew praise from rap heavyweights Jay-Z and Nelly. When asked about his presence in the hip-hop community, Mayer said, "It's not music out there right now. That's why, to me, hip-hop is where rock used to be."

Around this time Mayer announced that he was "closing up shop on acoustic sensitivity". In the spring of 2005, Mayer formed the John Mayer Trio with bassist Pino Palladino and drummer Steve Jordan, both of whom he had met through studio sessions. The trio combined blues and rock music. In October 2005, they opened for the Rolling Stones and that November released a live album called Try! The band took a break in mid-2006.

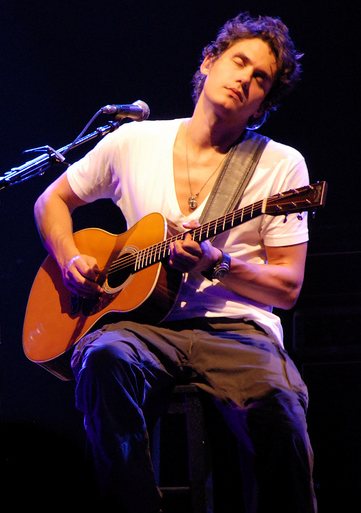
Mayer performing in San Jose, California, in June 2007

Mayer's third studio album, Continuum, was released on September 12, 2006, produced by Mayer and Steve Jordan. Mayer suggested the album was intended to combine blues and pop. In that vein, two of the tracks from his Trio release Try!—"Vultures" and "Gravity"—were included on Continuum. Despite his excitement, in a Rolling Stone interview, Mayer recalled that after former Columbia Records head Don Ienner panned Continuum he briefly considered quitting music and studying design full-time. Columbia Records believed that there weren't any "hits" on the album and as a result of that, Columbia got Mayer to make "Waiting on the World to Change". John Mayer admitted on the Bobby Bones Show that it's the song he dislikes performing live the most.

In May 2006, Mayer contributed a cover of the song "Route 66" for the Pixar animated film Cars (2006). Mayer's rendition garnered a nomination at the 49th Grammy Awards for Best Solo Rock Vocal Performance.

The first single from Continuum was "Waiting on the World to Change", which debuted on The Ron and Fez Show. On August 23, 2006, Mayer debuted the entire album on the Los Angeles radio station Star 98.7, offering commentary on each track. A subsequent version was released the next day on the Clear Channel Music website as a streaming sneak preview. On September 21, 2006, Mayer appeared on CSI: Crime Scene Investigation in the episode "Built to Kill, Part 1", playing "Waiting on the World to Change" and "Slow Dancing in a Burning Room". The song "Gravity" was featured on the television series House, in the episode "Cane & Able" and Numb3rs.

On December 7, 2006, Mayer was nominated for five Grammy Awards, including Album of the Year. The Trio received a nomination for Try!. He won two: Best Pop Song with Vocal for "Waiting on the World to Change" and Best Pop Album for Continuum. Mayer remixed an acoustic version of his single "Waiting on the World to Change" with vocal additions from fellow musician Ben Harper. In preparation for Continuum, Mayer had booked the Village Recorder in Los Angeles to record five acoustic versions of his songs with veteran musician Robbie McIntosh. These recordings became The Village Sessions, an EP released on December 12, 2006. As usual, Mayer oversaw the artwork. The initial North American Continuum tour ended on February 28, 2007, with a show at Madison Square Garden.

On November 20, 2007, the re-issue of Continuum became available online and in stores. The release contained a bonus disc of six live songs from his 2007 tour: five from Continuum and a cover of the Ray Charles song "I Don't Need No Doctor". On December 6, 2007, "Belief" was nominated for Best Male Pop Vocal for the 50th Annual Grammy Awards. He accompanied Alicia Keys on guitar on her song "No One" at the ceremony. Additionally, he was selected by the editors of Time magazine as one of the 100 Most Influential People of 2007, listed among artists and entertainers.

In February 2008, Mayer hosted a three-day Caribbean cruise event that included performances with various musicians including David Ryan Harris, Brett Dennen, Colbie Caillat, and Dave Barnes, among others. The event was called "The Mayercraft Carrier" and was held aboard the cruise ship known as the Carnival Victory. A follow-up cruise titled "Mayercraft Carrier 2" sailed from Los Angeles March 27–31, 2009, on the Carnival Splendor.

On July 1, 2008, Mayer released Where the Light Is, a live concert film of Mayer's performance at the Nokia Theatre L.A. Live on December 8, 2007. The film was directed by Danny Clinch. It features Mayer opening with an acoustic set, followed by a blues set with the Trio and concluded by a full set with the band from the Continuum album.

=== Battle Studies (2009) ===
Australian artist Guy Sebastian invited Mayer to collaborate on three songs from his 2009 album Like It Like That. Mayer also played guitar on the title track of Crosby Loggins' debut LP, Time to Move.

On July 7, 2009, Mayer performed an instrumental guitar version of Michael Jackson's "Human Nature" at Jackson's televised memorial service. He co-wrote "World of Chances" with Demi Lovato for Lovato's second album Here We Go Again, released later that month.

After the overwhelming success of Continuum, Mayer confessed to be intimidated with beginning on a follow-up. However, he stated, "I think it got a lot easier when I realized that no matter what I do, it's not going to be Continuum, good or bad." On November 17, 2009, Mayer's fourth studio album, Battle Studies, debuted at number one on the U.S. Billboard 200 album chart. The first single, "Who Says", was released on September 24, 2009, in advance of the album, followed on October 19 by "Heartbreak Warfare" and "Half of My Heart" on June 21, 2010. The accompanying arena tour grossed US$45 million. Despite the album's commercial success, critics reactions were mixed. Some reviews glowed, calling it his "most adventurous", while others called the album "safe" and noted that "Mayer the singer-songwriter and Mayer the man about town sometimes seem disconnected, like they don't even belong in the same body". Mayer admitted to Rolling Stone that he thought Battle Studies was not his best album.

=== Personal troubles and hiatus (2010–2013) ===
I did a lot of therapy, like anti-acid reflux, and it didn't work, then I went on vocal rest. No alcohol. No spicy food. No talking. Most of September I wasn't talking at all. I'd have a Bluetooth keyboard, and someone would have an iPad to read what I type. I had to point to menus at restaurants.

— John Mayer

Following two revealing and highly controversial magazine interviews in February 2010 with Rolling Stone and Playboy magazines, Mayer withdrew from public life and ceased giving interviews. While still on tour for Battle Studies, he began work in earnest on his fifth studio album—which drew on the popular music of Laurel Canyon in the early 1970s. Around this time, he began to experience vocal problems, and sought medical assistance. On September 16, 2011, he posted on his blog that his next record, Born and Raised, would be delayed due to treatment he was receiving for a granuloma discovered on his vocal cords. Mayer described the event as a "temporary setback" and added that the album was entirely finished except for a few vocal tracks. A month later, on October 20, 2011, Mayer posted, "I had surgery this afternoon to remove it and am now on complete vocal rest for a month or more," during which he planned to "travel the country, look, and listen". However, the surgery did not work as expected, and he had to undergo another one that August. During his travels, he visited and fell in love with Bozeman, Montana, where he bought a house and re-settled in the spring of 2012.

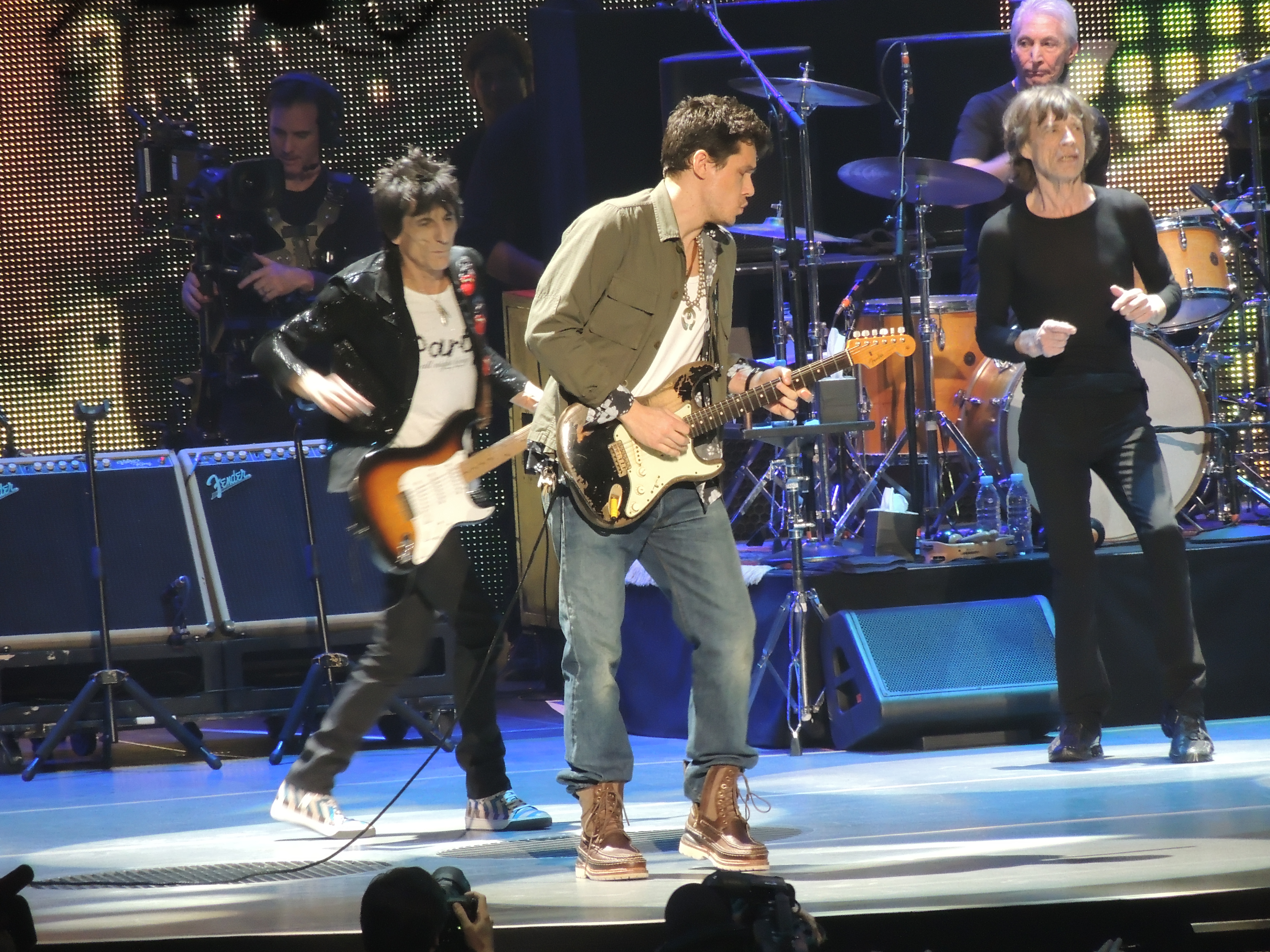
Mayer on stage with the Rolling Stones at the Prudential Center, New Jersey, on December 13, 2012

With his treatments complete, Mayer finished the vocals on Born and Raised, and the album's first single, "Shadow Days", was released on February 27, 2012. The following day, he released the track listing for the album, announcing that it would be released on May 22 of that year. He described it as his "most honest" album, and begin booking dates at more "intimate" venues than for Battle Studies. He also accepted an invitation to appear at the South by Southwest festival. However, the granuloma returned, and on March 9, 2012, Mayer announced that he had been forced to cancel his tour and refrain from all singing indefinitely. Even so, Born and Raised was released as scheduled, and entered the Billboard 200 chart at number one, selling 219,000 copies in its first week. It also received generally positive critical feedback; Rolling Stone rated it number 17 on its list of the 50 Best Albums of 2012, and People magazine called it "a shimmering album". Meanwhile, Mayer brought a new focus to his guitar playing and, fearing that his vocal cords had been permanently damaged, tried to come to terms with a possible future as a session musician. Determined to be cured, he sought help from the UCLA Voice Center. That September, otolaryngologist Dr. Gerald Berke paralyzed Mayer's vocal cords with a series of high-dose Botox injections, hoping that they would allow the granuloma to heal. Mayer's vocal rest extended to several months and, unable to even talk, his performances were limited to accompanying other artists on guitar. He appeared in September 2012 on Saturday Night Live, where he joined musical guest Frank Ocean. He played with the Rolling Stones in New Jersey in December 2012.

By January 2013, Mayer had recovered sufficiently enough to perform at a benefit concert in Bozeman, after almost two years without singing publicly. In April 2013, he made an appearance at the Crossroads Guitar Festival, and at the 28th Annual Rock and Roll Hall of Fame Induction Ceremony, where he inducted the late Albert King. A show at the Tuscaloosa Amphitheater in Alabama on April 25, 2013, followed by a set at the New Orleans Jazz & Heritage Festival the next day, marked his first full-length concerts since his health troubles.

=== Paradise Valley, Dead & Company, The Search for Everything (2013–2018) ===
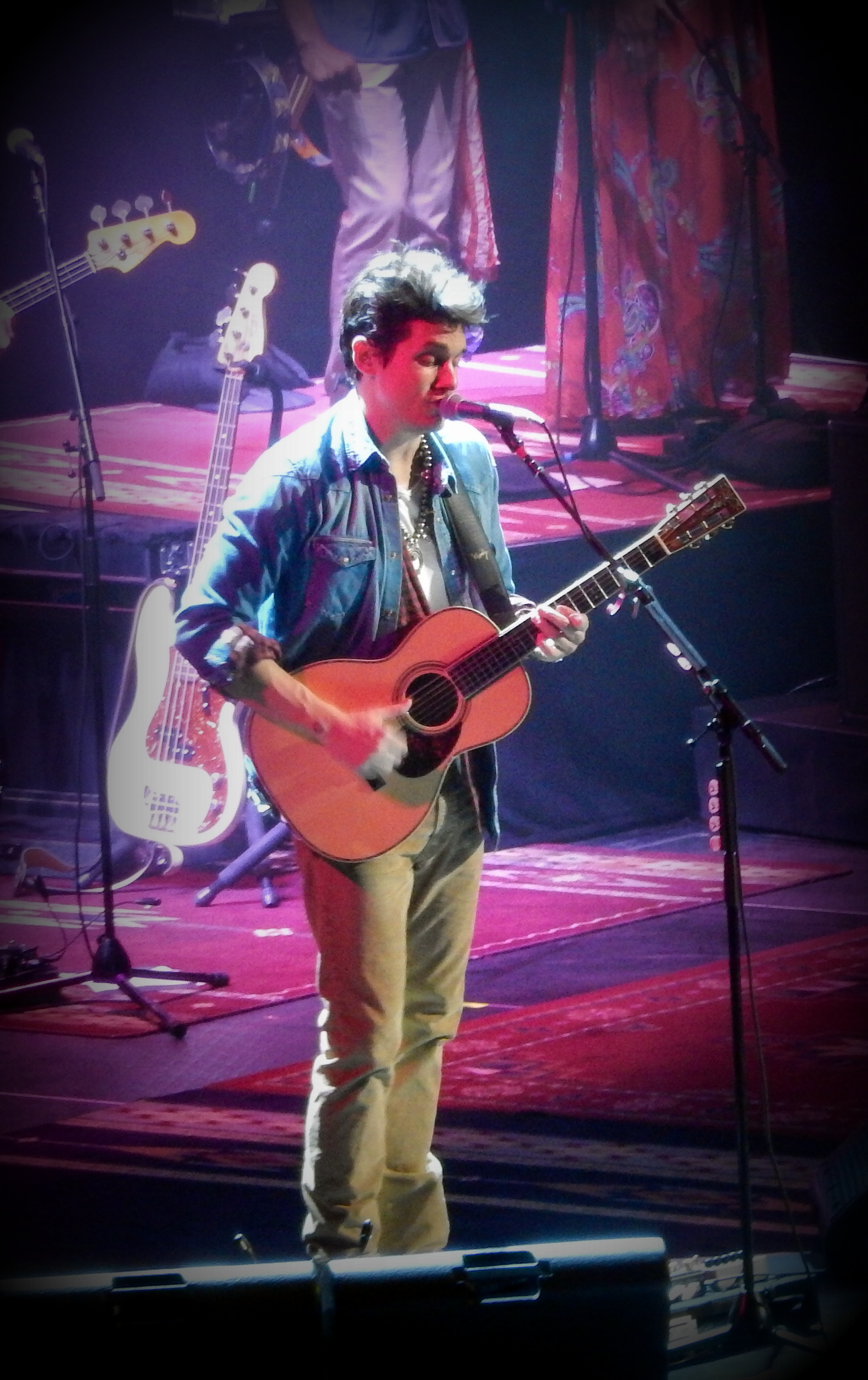
Mayer performing at the Barclays Center in Brooklyn, New York, on December 17, 2013

In June 2013, Mayer announced that he was finishing work on his sixth album, Paradise Valley. Produced by Don Was, the album features "low-key folk-rock tunes". He collaborated with Frank Ocean on the song "Wildfire Pt. 2", and with Katy Perry on "Who You Love". The latter song would go on to become the album's third single, and an accompanying music video was released on December 17. On June 18, 2013, he released a lyric video for the album's first single, "Paper Doll", on his official YouTube page. The album was released August 20, 2013, and—meeting with positive reviews—debuted at number two on the Billboard 200 chart, with first-week sales of 145,560 copies in the United States. Mayer embarked on a tour, his first in three years, in support of Born and Raised and Paradise Valley. The American leg of the tour ran from July to December 2013 with Interscope recording artist Phillip Phillips serving as the supporting act. The tour visited Australia in April 2014.

During a concert in Adelaide, Mayer covered the Beyoncé song "XO" . One month later, on May 22, he released a studio version of the song on his SoundCloud account. It was made available for digital download by Columbia Records on May 27, 2014, through the iTunes Store. For the week ending June 1, 2014, Mayer's version debuted at number 90 on the US Billboard Hot 100 chart and number 13 on the US Hot Rock Songs chart. On the Canadian Hot 100, "XO" peaked at a position of 76. The single also peaked at number 81 on the Australian Singles Chart (its debut week), and at number 95 on the Dutch Singles Chart. In the UK, it peaked at 115 on the UK singles chart. Mayer recorded the song "Come Rain or Come Shine" as a duet with Barbra Streisand for her album Partners, released in September 2014.

In February 2015, Mayer performed alongside Ed Sheeran at the Grammy Awards. As of March, Mayer said he was taking break from working on a "deeply personal new album". Mayer also recounted that in 2011 he happened upon a song by the Grateful Dead while listening to Pandora, and that soon the band's music was all he would listen to. In February 2015, while guest hosting The Late Late Show, Mayer invited Grateful Dead guitar player Bob Weir to join him in a studio performance. While Weir, Phil Lesh, Mickey Hart and Bill Kreutzmann (surviving members of the Grateful Dead) were preparing for their Fare Thee Well: Celebrating 50 Years of the Grateful Dead tour with Trey Anastasio, Mayer began practicing the band's catalog of songs. That August, Mayer, Weir, Kreutzmann, and Hart formed the group Dead & Company, along with Jeff Chimenti and Oteil Burbridge, and began a fall tour in the United States. The tour was well received (Billboard called it "magical"), and they continued to tour the US into 2016. Although Lesh has declined to join Dead & Company, Mayer also performed with Phil Lesh and Friends at Terrapin Crossroads in 2015.

As a result of his touring with Dead & Company, Mayer postponed working on his next studio album until January 2016, with plans to finish it by the end of the year. On November 17, 2016, Mayer released "Love on the Weekend" as the lead single from his EP The Search for Everything: Wave One, which was then released on January 20, 2017. A second EP, The Search for Everything: Wave Two, was released on February 24, 2017, along with the single "Still Feel Like Your Man". The album The Search for Everything was released on April 14, 2017, and was promoted by a third single titled "In the Blood", released on May 1, 2017, and by The Search for Everything World Tour from March to October of the same year.

Mayer also continued touring with Dead & Company during the summer and fall of 2017. On December 5, during the Fall Tour, his appendix burst, resulting in an emergency appendectomy and the postponement of the remaining tour dates to February 2018. In January 2018, Dead & Company announced their Dead & Company Summer Tour 2018.

=== Sob Rock (2018–present) ===
On May 10, 2018, Mayer released the single "New Light", co-produced by No I.D. and Mayer himself. In an interview with Zane Lowe for Apple Music on the release day, he announced "more new music" for 2018. During his performance at the iHeartRadio Theater on October 24, 2018, he premiered a song titled "I Guess I Just Feel Like". On December 12, 2018, he announced a world tour for 2019. Mayer released two singles in 2019; the previously played "I Guess I Just Feel Like" on February 22, and "Carry Me Away" on September 6.

During an episode of John Mayer's show "Current Mood" on March 15, 2020, he revealed that he was in the process of writing and recording songs for a new album. In early 2021, he stated that the album was completely finished as he began posting snippets of new songs on TikTok ahead of release. In an interview with Kerwin Frost, Mayer hinted at an April release for the album. Later, the date was pushed back. On June 1, 2021, Mayer officially announced his eighth album, Sob Rock, and on June 4, released the lead single "Last Train Home" along with an accompanying music video. The album was released on July 16, 2021, as well as a music video for the song, "Shot in the Dark". The track list included previously released singles "New Light", "I Guess I Just Feel Like" and "Carry Me Away". "Carry Me Away" was slightly reworked production-wise to fit the album's 1980s aesthetic.

In 2023, Mayer was ranked at number 61 on "The 250 Greatest Guitarists of All Time" list by Rolling Stone magazine.

== Touring ==
Mayer began touring as a solo artist in 2001. While his early records were largely acoustic, early reviewers noted his unexpected electric "guitar heroics" during live performances.

Mayer has toured North America, Europe and Australia with many musical groups, including Maroon 5, Counting Crows, Ben Folds, the Wallflowers, Sheryl Crow, Colbie Caillat and Train. In 2010, Mayer and Keith Urban performed at a CMT Crossroads concert a medley of their songs and a rendition of George Michael's single "Faith". This performance led to Urban and Mayer teaming up again for future performances, including at the 2010 CMT Music Awards.

Mayer allows audio taping and non-commercial trading of those recordings at most of his live performances. Mayer often shows up at small venues unannounced (or with little advance notice) for surprise concerts—occasionally for free or without accepting the performance fee. He has made appearances throughout the Los Angeles, Atlanta, and New York areas, including shows at the Laugh Factory, Eddie's Attic, and the Village Underground. After a public campaign by their senior class president, Mayer performed a surprise three-song set at the 2004 Pennsbury High School senior prom. In June 2015, Mayer appeared as a guest for two nights with Phil Lesh and Friends at Terrapin Crossroads, recreating the Grateful Dead's notable May 8 and June 9, 1977, concerts.

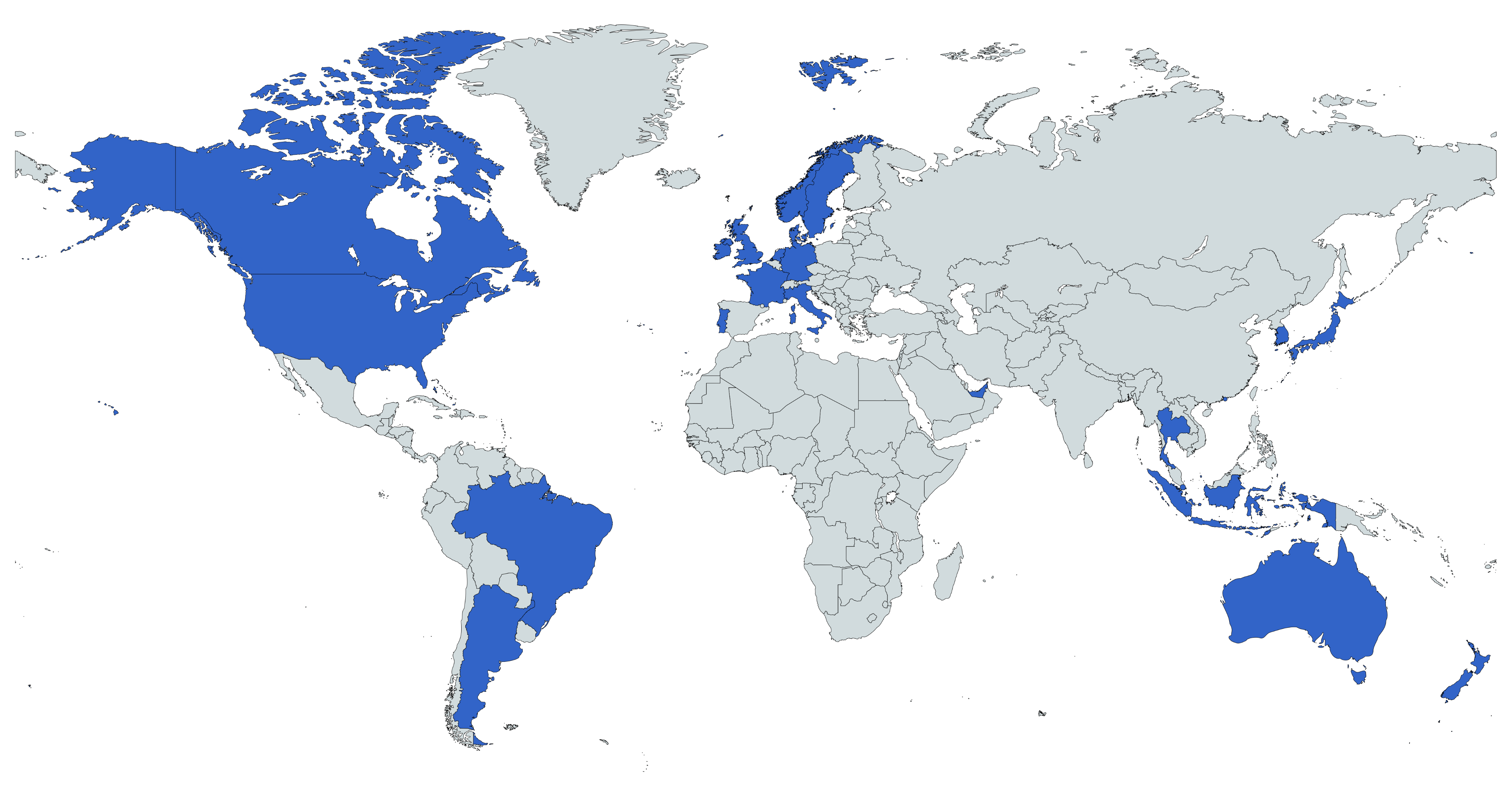
Concert tour locations of John Mayer as of March 2025, showing countries where he has performed live.

Headlining

- Room for Squares Tour (2002)
- Heavier Things Tour (2003–2004)
- John Mayer 2004 Summer Tour (2004)
- Continuum Tour (2006–2007)
- John Mayer 2008 Summer Tour (2008)
- Battle Studies World Tour (2009–2010)
- Born and Raised World Tour (2013–2014)
- The Search for Everything World Tour (2017)
- John Mayer 2019 World Tour (2019)
- Sob Rock Tour (2022)
- Solo Tour (2023)

Co-headlining

- John Mayer/Guster Summer Tour (2002)
- John Mayer/Counting Crows Summer Tour (2003)
- John Mayer/Sheryl Crow Tour (2006)

Opening act

- Sting European Tour (2004)

Touring with Dead & Company

Mayer joined each annual Tour in the years 2015 to the present.

== Other ventures ==
=== Dead & Company ===
Since 2015, Mayer has been touring with Bob Weir, Bill Kreutzmann and Mickey Hart of the Grateful Dead. Founding bassist Phil Lesh had notably declined to participate in the project, although he did perform with Mayer on a few occasions since Dead & Company began. The role of bassist in Dead & Company has instead been played by Oteil Burbridge of the Allman Brothers Band. Jeff Chimenti, who has toured with the various spin-offs of the Dead since the 1990s, is the group's keyboardist.

Although Mayer had been familiar with the music of the Grateful Dead since at least high school, he began to develop a strong interest in their music in 2011 after hearing their song "Althea" by chance on Pandora radio. In 2015, while the Dead's Fare Thee Well shows with Trey Anastasio were also being planned, Mayer performed "Althea" with Weir on The Late Late Show, along with "Truckin'". Weir was impressed with Mayer's take on the material and began planning to work with him after the Fare Thee Well shows, despite them being billed as something of finale for the band and its legacy. Weir discussed the genesis of the band and his thoughts about working with Mayer in an interview with Rolling Stone in 2016:

I was doing preliminary get-togethers with Trey, kicking around the material. Trey is also a monster musician. If I had to make a broad categorization, John is a classicist by nature. Trey is more of an iconoclast. They're both explorers, someone who's happy to break tradition. Juxtaposing Trey's take on the material with the insights John brings got me looking at all of the songs afresh. I look forward to playing with Trey again, any old time. But I am really eager to get back out with John-boy and chase the music around, get to know each other. When that dream came to me, it was at about that point that I started to realize that I was feeling comfortable with knowing that John had moved, musically speaking – being able to intuit the songs. We were feeling each other out on a new level, several bars down the road.

The thought of pop singer Mayer stepping in for Jerry Garcia was met with some initial skepticism by both fans and music critics, but the shows have since been well received. The band continues to tour 2022 and has considered recording a studio album consisting of songs from the Grateful Dead catalog and potentially some originals. In a 2017 interview with Rolling Stone, Lesh praised the band's performances and explained his decision not to take part:

"I think they're doing a great job. They're bringing the music to the people just like we always wanted to do, and I commend them for it. I hope they're having a good time. It's not something I could do myself, I'm done with that kind of touring.'

=== Author ===
With the June 2004 issue of Esquire, Mayer began a column called "Music Lessons with John Mayer". Each article featured a lesson and his views on various topics, both of personal and popular interest. In the August 2005 issue, he invited readers to create music for orphaned lyrics he had written. The winner was Tim Fagan of Los Angeles as announced in the following January's issue.

As social media gained momentum in the 2000s, Mayer became increasingly active online, and maintained five blogs: a Myspace page, a blog at his official site, another at Honeyee.com, one at tumblr, and a photoblog at StunningNikon.com. He was particularly prolific on Twitter, where he was noted for authoring his own posts, and he amassed 3.7 million followers. Although his posts often dealt with career-related matters, they also included jokes, videos, photos, and eventually what he called the "maintenance of vapor"—or misguided, personal responses to the media. On January 23, 2008, he posted the quote "There is danger in theoretical speculation of battle, in prejudice, in false reasoning, in pride, in braggadocio. There is one safe resource, the return to nature."; all the previous blog entries were deleted. On September 14, 2010, he deleted his personal Twitter account.

In the mid-2000s, he did comedy sporadically, making random appearances at the famed Comedy Cellar in New York and at other venues. He stated that it helped him write better, but that increased media attention made him too careful in his technique. He has since said he has no plans to return to it.

=== Watch collector ===
Mayer is an avid collector of watches, a pastime that he says keeps him "sane". His collection — which he values in the "tens of millions" of dollars — includes a Patek Philippe with a Sky Moon Tourbillon, a Rolex GMT Master 116710 BLNR, and an IWC Big Pilot Ref 5002, his signature watch. He has also served as a juror at the Grand Prix d'Horlogerie de Genève, a competition rewarding timepieces that champion the values of Swiss-made watches and writes a column for the horology website Hodinkee. In his column for January 16, 2015, he wrote an open letter to the watch brand IWC, encouraging it to "embrace [its] heritage, scale the product line down in terms of model variants, and simplify the design language". IWC replied, defending the changes they've made over the years, saying, "We have a wonderful past, it is true—but in admiring what we achieved thus far, we hope you will feel encouraged to look forward to what we achieve in the future".

In March 2024, Mayer was appointed with the title of "Creative Conduit" at Audemars Piguet, to help facilitate the connection between the watch brand and collectors. In addition to the new role, Mayer and AP also announced a new limited-edition collaborative Perpetual Calendar Royal Oak model (Ref. 26574BC.OO.1220BC.02), dubbed the "John Mayer" and designed by its namesake. It features a "Crystal Sky" faceted blue dial, a white-gold case and bracelet, and is limited to 200 pieces.

=== Current Mood ===
During an appearance on the Jimmy Kimmel Live! show in September 2018, Mayer showed a trailer for his new Instagram Live show. The show, entitled Current Mood, debuted on his IGTV account on Sunday evening on September 30, 2018. Episodes have continued to air on that schedule on a weekly basis. Guests have included Maggie Rogers, Halsey, B.J. Novak, Dave Chappelle, Charlie Puth, Finneas, Cazzie David, and Thundercat. Mayer's latest season of Current Mood began on Sunday November 18, 2019, with guest Shawn Mendes and surprise feature with Camila Cabello on his first episode. For Current Mood Mayer coined notable jingles including "Camila Camendes", "CVS Bag", and "Drone Shot of My Yacht".

=== Life with John Mayer ===
In October 2023, Mayer announced a new real-time satellite radio channel on SiriusXM, titled "Life with John Mayer". The year-round channel features music curated by Mayer, including Mayer's classics, collaborations, and never released material, along with selected music from all genres. In November 2024, Mayer began an interview series on the channel called "How's Life," featuring conversations with fellow musicians. Billy Joel was the first guest, followed by Shawn Mendes, and Maren Morris.

=== Appearances in the media ===
In 2004, Mayer hosted a one-shot, half-hour comedy special on VH1 titled John Mayer Has a TV Show, with antics including wearing a bear suit while anonymously teasing concertgoers in the parking lot outside one of his concerts.

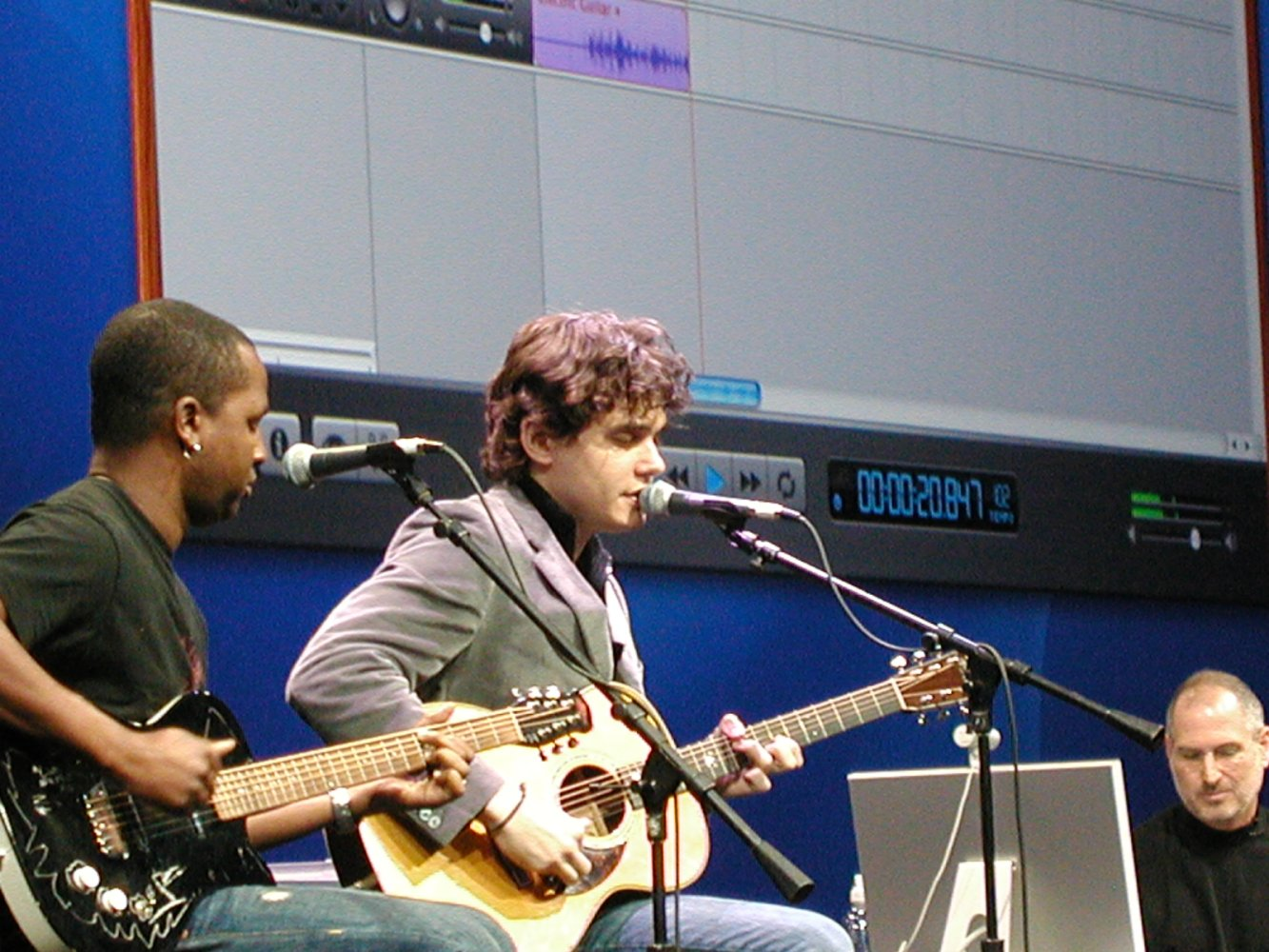
January 2005, left to right: David Ryan Harris, John Mayer and Steve Jobs at Macworld 11, San Francisco Moscone Center

Steve Jobs invited Mayer to perform during Apple's annual keynote address at the Macworld Conference & Expo in January 2004 as Jobs introduced the music production software GarageBand. Mayer became a fixture of the event, including at the 2007 iPhone announcement. Volkswagen concluded a deal with instrument manufacturer First Act to include a GarageMaster electric guitar that was playable through the stereo system of six of their 2007 models; Mayer (along with Slash and Christopher Guest) were selected to endorse the campaign and were featured playing the guitar in ads. Mayer used and endorsed the BlackBerry Curve.

Mayer made many appearances on talk shows and other television programs, most notably on a Chappelle's Show comedy skit, the Late Show with David Letterman and on the final episode of Late Night with Conan O'Brien. Mayer appeared with Rob Dyrdek in the MTV show Rob Dyrdek's Fantasy Factory. Mayer wrote the theme song to the OWN network show Rollin' with Zach, which features Zach Anner. CBS invited him to guest host The Late Late Show in early 2015 on three dates, February 4–6, after the retirement of Craig Ferguson. He appeared as a guest star on the fourth episode of the tenth season of the TruTV show Impractical Jokers in 2023.

Mayer makes a cameo as a truck driver in the 2014 comedy horror film Zombeavers. In the 2015 film Get Hard, he played a version of himself who is disgusted with the "monetization of the creative process". Mayer also had a small role in the 2022 film Vengeance, playing a friend of the lead character.

== Instruments and equipment ==
John Mayer is a guitar collector and has collaborated with elite guitar companies to design his own instruments. In 2006, Mayer was estimated to have more than 200 guitars in his personal collection.

In 2003, Martin Guitars gave Mayer his own signature model acoustic guitar called the OM-28 John Mayer. The guitar was limited to a run of only 404, an Atlanta area code. This model was followed by the release of two Fender signature Stratocaster electric guitars, beginning in 2005. A third Stratocaster, finished in charcoal frost metallic paint with a racing stripe, was also a limited-release, with only 100 guitars made. In January 2006, Martin Guitars released the Martin OMJM John Mayer acoustic guitar. The guitar was intended to have many of the attributes of the Martin OM-28 John Mayer but with a more affordable price tag. In August 2006, Fender started manufacturing SERIES II John Mayer Stratocasters.

In January 2007, Two-Rock collaborated with Mayer on custom-designed amps. Only 25 (all signed by Mayer himself) were made available to the public, along with a 500-run John Mayer signature Fender Stratocaster in Cypress-Mica. Included in the limited Cypress-Mica model was the INCSvsJM gig bag, on which Mayer collaborated on the in-case designs.

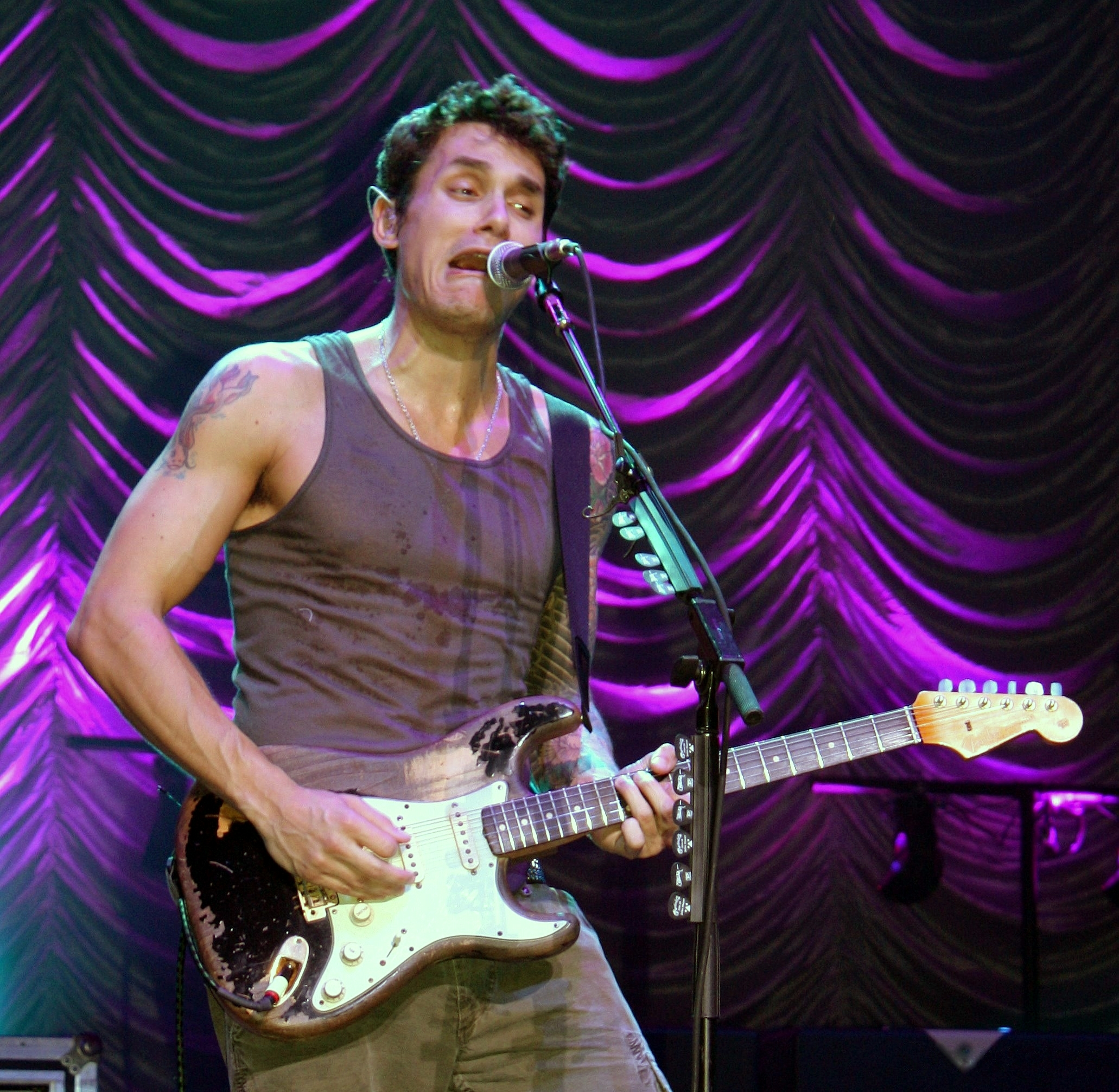
Mayer playing his signature Black1 Stratocaster in 2008

John Mayer's most iconic guitar is the "Black1". Conceived after the Heavier Things tour, Mayer went to Fender Custom Shop with the desire to build a guitar. He was inspired by guitars of famous players the likes of Rory Gallagher and Stevie Ray Vaughan. He sought out masterbuilder John Cruz to help devise the design. In essence, Mayer wanted an all-black version of Stevie Ray Vaughan's "First Wife" Stratocaster. The guitar is heavily "relic'd" to specs very similar to the guitar used by Stevie Ray Vaughan. The Black1 includes a mint pickguard, custom wound pickups, gold hardware, and gold tuners from the SRV Tribute Stratocaster. It was the principal guitar on the Continuum album. It was notably used on tracks such as "I Don't Trust Myself With Loving You", and "Bold as Love". The Black1 has become a trademark to Mayer's music.

The Fender Custom Shop made a limited run of 83 replica Black1 Stratocasters, all of which were sold within 24 hours. Each one was carefully relic'd by John Cruz. In 2010, Fender announced a production model of Mayer's Black1 guitar. Un-relic'd production versions of the guitar were produced for a limited run of 500 worldwide. In addition, full production signature Stratocasters were produced in three-tone sunburst and Olympic White finishes.

In 2014, John Mayer announced that he was no longer a Fender Artist. As a result, his signature line of guitars was pulled from production. In 2015, Mayer announced that he was collaborating with PRS Guitars. In March 2016, Mayer and PRS revealed their collaborative project, the Super Eagle. This was a limited release from PRS's Private Stock line of instruments and each guitar features ultra-grade woods, abalone inlay, JCF Audio preamps, and a hand-signed sticker by glass-artist David Smith. Only 100 were produced, each retailing for over $10,000. In January 2017 at the NAMM Show, PRS and Mayer announced the J-MOD 100 signature amp. In June 2017, the Super Eagle II was revealed, limited to 120 instruments.

In January 2018, Martin Guitar announced the limited-release (45 instruments) John Mayer Signature D-45, with list price $14,999. In March 2018, Mayer's signature Silver Sky model was released by PRS, available in four colors. While Music Trade called the Silver Sky "derivative", it said that all the elements were "designed from the ground up" and built with "attention to detail". While acknowledging its similarity to a Stratocaster, Matt Blackett of Guitar Player magazine ultimately said, "The Silver Sky absolutely delivers on the promise of being a damn-near-perfect version of this type of guitar." The magazine named its "Editor's Pick".

Mayer owns multiple Dumble amplifiers, a highly exclusive brand of amps that only a handful of guitarists—including Kenny Wayne Shepherd, Robben Ford, and Carlos Santana—are known to play on a regular basis. In particular, Mayer owns the Dumbleland Special model used by Stevie Ray Vaughan to record his album Texas Flood. He used this amp during his performance for Vaughan's induction into the Rock and Roll Hall of Fame, which he called a "special thing". For his album Sob Rock, Mayer recorded with a Fractal Axe-Fx digital amp modeler alongside his Dumble amps. Mayer has been credited for renewing industry interest in the Marshall Bluesbreaker overdrive pedal after he started using one for live performances. While unpopular during its brief production run in the early 1990s, the attention generated by Mayer's use of the Bluesbreaker led to Marshall reissuing the entire line of effects pedals it was part of.

== Reception ==
Mayer was featured on the cover of Rolling Stone (No. 1020) in February 2007, along with John Frusciante and Derek Trucks, in an issue lauding the "New Guitar Gods". The cover nicknamed him Slowhand Jr., a reference to Eric Clapton. Critics, however, often pointed to how safe they felt Mayer's music was. Chris Richards, in a review of a 2017 concert, declared Mayer is "an amazing guitar player", albeit doing so "through clenched teeth". Richards went on to say that his talent as a guitarist did not make him exempt from criticism of "his pillow-soft songcraft, the dull sentimentality of his lyrics, or that cuckoo-racist interview he gave to Playboy back in 2010". Music writer Steve Baltin commented on this dichotomy, saying that Mayer is "one of the sharpest and savviest musical minds you will ever encounter", and added: "While many have found reasons to dislike Mayer since the beginning of his career, he is a consummate musician's musician, an artist who has been embraced by Eric Clapton, Stevie Wonder and Buddy Guy among others."

Mayer's inclusion in the line-up of Dead & Company was criticised by Chris Robinson of The Black Crowes, who had previously played several shows with The Grateful Dead. Speaking during an interview with Howard Stern, Robinson was quoted as saying that "everything that Jerry Garcia ever talked about or stood for, John Mayer is the antithesis", and that while "Jerry was one of the most unique musicians in the world [...] here's John Mayer playing everyone else's licks". In response, Mayer said in an interview with Rolling Stone that he "care[s] about this band too much to give that [comment] life", and that he was "done debating [his] own merits".

== Personal life ==
On his third episode of Current Mood, Mayer revealed he had been sober since 2016. He stopped drinking after having what he says was a six-day hangover after Drake's 30th birthday party. Mayer maintains close relationships with his father and siblings and embraces a domestic role when he is not on tour.

In March 2014, Mayer sued watch dealer Robert Maron for $656,000 when he discovered that seven of the $5 million in watches he purchased from the dealer contained counterfeit parts. He dropped the action in May 2015, releasing a statement that asserted that research restored his "belief that Bob Maron is an expert on Rolex watches and confirmed that Bob Maron never sold him a counterfeit watch."

Mayer was a friend of the late comedian and actor Bob Saget, and when Saget unexpectedly died in an Orlando, Florida, hotel room in January 2022, Mayer had Saget's body flown back to Los Angeles on a private jet. Likewise, he and Jeff Ross retrieved Saget's car, which was parked at Los Angeles International Airport.

=== Relationships ===
Mayer has been romantically involved with Jennifer Love Hewitt, Jessica Simpson, Minka Kelly, Jennifer Aniston, Katy Perry, and Taylor Swift.

Mayer's relationship with Jessica Simpson coincided with behavior changes that significantly increased his tabloid exposure. Early in his career, he had expressed his resolve to completely avoid drugs, alcohol, clubbing, "red-carpet" events, dating celebrities, and anything that he felt would detract the focus from his music. In later interviews Mayer alluded to experiencing an extreme "anxiety bender" episode in his twenties that motivated him to be less reclusive. In 2006, he first mentioned that he had begun using marijuana. He began making appearances at clubs in Los Angeles and New York City, and Simpson became the first in a string of famous girlfriends, including Jennifer Aniston and Minka Kelly. By 2007, his personal life had become regular fodder for the gossip media and, as a result, Mayer made efforts to control his public image. His online presence increased, he began to stage pranks for the paparazzi, and he hosted a segment for the gossip show TMZ.

I abused that ability to express myself, to the point where I was expressing things that weren't true to my thoughts.

— John Mayer, Rolling Stone interview, January 2013

In early 2010, Mayer gave a controversial interview to Playboy magazine in which he revealed sexually explicit details about his former girlfriends Jessica Simpson and Jennifer Aniston—calling his relationship with the former "sexual napalm". In response to a question about whether black women were interested in him, he said, "My dick is sort of like a white supremacist. I've got a Benetton heart and a fuckin' David Duke cock. I'm going to start dating separately from my dick." He also used the word "nigger" in the interview. This set off accusations in the media of him being a misogynist, kiss-and-tell ex-boyfriend, and racist. He apologized via Twitter for his use of the word "nigger", saying, "It was arrogant of me to think I could intellectualize ... a word that is so emotionally charged". He also tearfully apologized to his band and fans at his concert in Nashville later that night. In the following two years, he left New York and retreated from the media. Reflecting on that time in a May 2012 episode of The Ellen DeGeneres Show, he said:

"I lost my head for a little while and I did a couple of dumb interviews and it kind of woke me up...It was a violent crash into being an adult. For a couple of years, it was just figuring it all out, and I'm glad I actually stayed out of the spotlight."

Singer-songwriter Taylor Swift performed vocals for the song "Half of My Heart" on Mayer's November 2009 album Battle Studies. Rumors began to circulate in the media that the two were a couple, an assertion that neither addressed. However, Swift released a song called "Dear John" in 2010, which was widely believed to be about her relationship with him. In June 2012, Mayer criticized the song, saying she never contacted him and that "it's abusing your talent to rub your hands together and go, 'Wait till he gets a load of this!'" The song "Paper Doll" was reported to be a response. In the March 21, 2019, episode of Current Mood, however, Mayer said:

"When 'Paper Doll' came out, 100% of the people believed it was about somebody. ... But the song was not about that person and I could never tell anybody, 'That's not true,' because then I would be breaking my rule that songwriters don't say who the songs are about or not about."

While in a relationship with Katy Perry, Mayer recorded and co-wrote a duet with her titled "Who You Love" for his album Paradise Valley. The song was released on August 12, 2013. The cover for the single was revealed amongst a photo shoot of the couple shot by Mario Sorrenti for Vanity Fair magazine. They performed the song together at Barclays Center in Brooklyn, New York on December 17, 2013, which was the last night of Mayer's Born and Raised World Tour. Their relationship ended in 2014.

=== Philanthropy ===
In 2002, Mayer created the "Back to You" Fund, a nonprofit organization that focuses on fundraising in the areas of health care, education, the arts and talent development. The foundation auctions exclusive John Mayer items, such as guitar picks, T-shirts and signed CDs. The auctions have been successful, with some tickets selling for more than 17 times their face value.

Mayer participated at the East Rutherford, New Jersey, location of the Live Earth project, a musical rally to support awareness for climate change held July 7, 2007.

Mayer performed at a number of benefits and telethons for charity throughout his career. He has participated in benefits for the Elton John AIDS Foundation. In response to the Virginia Tech shooting, Mayer (along with Dave Matthews Band, Phil Vassar, and Nas) performed a free concert at Virginia Tech's Lane Stadium on September 6, 2007. followed by an appearance with Rob Thomas at the Annual Holiday Concert at Blythedale Children's Hospital in Valhalla that winter. On December 8, 2007, Mayer hosted the first annual Charity Revue, a tradition he has continued each year. Charities who have benefited from the concerts include Toys for Tots, Inner City Arts and the Los Angeles Mission. CDs and DVDs of the first concert were released as Where the Light Is in July 2008. Mayer appeared on Songs for Tibet: The Art of Peace, a celebrity initiative to support Tibet and the 14th Dalai Lama, Tenzin Gyatso. Mayer (along with Keith Urban) headlined Tiger Jam 2011 in Las Vegas to help raise around $750,000 for the Tiger Woods Foundation. In January 2013, Mayer participated with Zac Brown in a benefit concert in Bozeman, Montana where they raised more than $100,000 for firefighters who battled a wildfire in the summer of 2012 in Paradise Valley that destroyed 12,000 acres.

In 2017, John established a scholarship fund honoring his father Richard's 90th birthday. The fund provides 4-year college scholarships to Bridgeport public high school seniors pursuing education degrees (teaching or administration). Recipients must demonstrate community service leadership, maintain a 2.5 GPA, and have financial need.

On March 1, 2019, Mayer established the Heart and Armor Foundation in support of veterans of war. He has been actively involved in initiatives to help returning veterans for about 12 years.

== Discography ==
- Room for Squares (2001)
- Heavier Things (2003)
- Continuum (2006)
- Battle Studies (2009)
- Born and Raised (2012)
- Paradise Valley (2013)
- The Search for Everything (2017)
- Sob Rock (2021)

== Awards and nominations ==
=== Grammy Awards ===
Mayer has won seven awards from nineteen nominations.

Year	Awardee	Category	Result
2003	Himself	Best New Artist	Nominated
2003	"Your Body Is a Wonderland"	Best Male Pop Vocal Performance	Won
2005	"Daughters"	Song of the Year	Won
2005	"Daughters"	Best Male Pop Vocal Performance	Won
2007	Continuum	Album of the Year	Nominated
2007	Continuum	Best Pop Vocal Album	Won
2007	Try!	Best Rock Album	Nominated
2007	"Waiting on the World to Change"	Best Male Pop Vocal Performance	Won
2007	"Route 66"	Best Solo Rock Vocal Performance	Nominated
2008	"Belief"	Best Male Pop Vocal Performance	Nominated
2009	"Say"	Best Male Pop Vocal Performance	Won
2009	"Say"	Best Song Written for a Motion Picture, Television or Other Visual Media	Nominated
2009	"Gravity"	Best Solo Rock Vocal Performance	Won
2009	"Lesson Learned"	Best Pop Collaboration with Vocals	Nominated
2009	Where the Light Is: John Mayer Live in Los Angeles	Best Long Form Music Video	Nominated
2011	Battle Studies	Best Pop Vocal Album	Nominated
2011	"Half of My Heart"	Best Male Pop Vocal Performance	Nominated
2011	"Crossroads"	Best Solo Rock Vocal Performance	Nominated
2013	Channel Orange (featured artist)	Album of the Year	Nominated

=== Other awards and nominations ===
Year	Award	Category
2002	MTV Video Music Awards	Best New Artist in a Video for "No Such Thing" – nominated
2002	Orville H. Gibson Guitar Awards	Les Paul Horizon Award (Most Promising Up and Coming Guitarist)
2002	VH1 Big in 2002 Awards	Can't Get You Out of My Head Award for "No Such Thing"
2002	Pollstar Concert Industry Awards	Best New Artist Tour
2003	20th Annual ASCAP Awards	Most Performed Songs – "No Such Thing" (shared with Clay Cook) ^{Awarded to songwriters and publishers of the most performed songs in the ASCAP repertory for the award period.}
2003	31st Annual American Music Awards	Favorite Male Artist – Pop or Rock 'n Roll Music
2003	15th Annual Boston Music Awards	Act of the Year; Male Vocalist of the Year; Song of the Year for "Your Body Is a Wonderland"
2003	MTV Video Music Awards	Best Male Video
2003	Radio Music Awards	Modern Adult Contemporary Radio Artist of the Year; Best Hook-Up Song for "Your Body Is a Wonderland"
2003	Teen People Awards	Choice Music – Male Artist (Nominated); Choice Music – Album for Any Given Thursday (Nominated); Choice Breakout Music Artist (Nominated)
2003	Danish Music Awards	Best New Artist
2004	BDS Certified Spin Awards; March 2004 recipients	Reached 100,000 spins for "Why Georgia"
2004	Teen Choice Awards	Choice Music – Male Artist (Nominated); Choice Music Tour for Heavier Things Tour (with Maroon 5) (Nominated)
2005	33rd annual American Music Awards	Adult Contemporary: Favorite Artist
2005	World Music Awards	World's Best Selling Rock Act
2005	People's Choice Awards	Favorite Male Artist
2006	ASCAP Awards	Most Performed Songs – "Daughters"
2007	35th Annual American Music Awards	Adult Contemporary Music – nominated
2007	23rd Annual TEC Awards	Tour Sound Production (for the Continuum Tour); Record Production/Single or Track (for production on "Waiting on the World to Change"); Record Production/Album (from production on Continuum)
2007	Teen Choice Awards	Choice Male Artist (Nominated)
2008	MTV Video Music Awards	Best Rock Video for "Beat It" (with Fall Out Boy) (Nominated)
2009	ASCAP Awards	Most Performed Songs – "Say"
2011	CMT Music Awards	CMT Performance of the Year for "Sweet Thing" (with Keith Urban) (Nominated)
2018	Teen Choice Awards	Choice Instagrammer (Nominated)

== See also ==
- Annual John Mayer Holiday Charity Revue

== Notes ==
a: Generally, it was believed that Mayer's father, a Bridgeport High School principal, had given him a tape player (confiscated from a student) that happened to contain Stevie Ray Vaughan album. However, in a 2006 interview on the New Zealand show Close Up (and other interviews), Mayer said that this was not true.
b: "Bittersweet Poetry" was released in the summer of 2007 (three years after its creation) as an iTunes pre-order bonus track to the album Graduation.
c: The quote is taken from the posthumously-published book Battle Studies by Colonel Ardant Du Picq (d. 1870)
