= No Such Thing (John Mayer song) =

2001 single by John Mayer

Single by John Mayer

from the album Room for Squares
- Written: 1998
- Released: June 4, 2001
- Length: 3:51
- Label: Columbia; Aware
- Songwriters: John Mayer; Clay Cook
- Producer: John Alagia

John Mayer singles chronology
"No Such Thing" (2001)	"Your Body Is a Wonderland" (2002)

"No Such Thing" is a song by American singer-songwriter John Mayer, released as his debut single. It was serviced to US adult album alternative radio in June 2001 as the lead single from his first studio album, Room for Squares (2001). Like many of the songs from Mayer's early musical career, the song was co-written with Clay Cook. The song was Mayer's breakthrough hit, peaking at number 13 on the US Billboard Hot 100, topping the Billboard Triple-A chart, and entering the top 40 in Australia and New Zealand.

== Content ==
Mayer and Cook wrote the song in about a week during 1998 in Duluth, Georgia. Sung from the path of a recent high school graduate, "No Such Thing"'s lyrical themes encourage the audience to forge their own path, and not to "stay inside the lines". It is particularly critical of efforts by educators and guidance counselors to encourage students to go to college and to plan for careers in the "real world"; instead expressing that there is "no such thing" as this environment, and that true fulfillment comes from doing what you love.

Lyrically, the song is extremely direct and autobiographical in nature. Unlike many of his classmates, Mayer did not attend college immediately after graduating, opting instead to work at a gas station and saving money to buy a guitar. He eventually attended Berklee College of Music for several months before dropping out to move to Atlanta, where he began working with Clay Cook and ultimately launched his music career.

The song was initially included in Mayer's debut EP Inside Wants Out and was one of four songs from that EP that was re-recorded for Room for Squares.

== Music video ==
Initially, Mayer requested permission to film the music video at Fairfield Warde High School in Fairfield, Connecticut, the high school of which he is an alumnus. However, due to the disparaging nature of the song's lyrics towards the school and its faculty, the administration denied Mayer's request.

The song's promotional video was debuted on Mayer's official website. VH1 chose the video for its Inside Track promotion, a distinction which endorses emerging artists. Directed by Sam Erickson, it is a performance piece of Mayer singing the song to an audience at the Georgia Theatre in Athens, Georgia.

== Critical reception ==
Haley Jones, who was the assistant PD of KFOG San Francisco—an early station to play the song, said, "It sounds great on the radio." Billboard said of the song's vocals, lyrics and melody, "What's not to love?" Jason Thompson with PopMatters said of the song, "it doesn't move me in any way." Stylus magazine praised "No Such Thing", calling it "lively."

== Commercial performance ==
In the US, "No Such Thing" peaked at number 13 on the Billboard Hot 100 and also made appearances on four other Billboard charts; its highest peak was on the Triple-A chart, where the song reached number one. The song was Mayer's highest-charting single in the US until 2008, when "Say" bested the peak of "No Such Thing" by one spot, hitting number 12.

Outside the US, the song found the most success in Australasia. It first charted in New Zealand in June 2002, reaching a peak of number 14 on September 22 and staying in the chart for 23 weeks in total; it ended 2002 as the country's 42nd best-selling single. In Australia, the single debuted at number 45 on September 29 and reached its peak position of number 28 on October 13. It spent five more week in top 50 before dropping out. To date, the song is Mayer's second best-charting solo single in both countries, after "Your Body Is a Wonderland". The song failed to make a significant impact in Europe, only reaching number 97 in the Netherlands and peaking outside the United Kingdom top 40 at number 42 in August 2003, the highest a single by Mayer would chart in the UK.

== Track listing ==
All songs were written by John Mayer unless otherwise noted.

1. "No Such Thing" – 3:51
2. "My Stupid Mouth" – 3:45
3. "Lenny" (live at the X Lounge) (Stevie Ray Vaughan)
4. "The Wind Cries Mary" (live at the X Lounge) (Jimi Hendrix)

== Personnel ==
- John Mayer: vocals, guitars, omnichord, Korg Triton synthesizer
- David LaBruyere: bass
- Nir Zidkyahu: drums
- Brandon Bush: Hammond organ, Wurlitzer electric piano
- John Alagia: percussion, production
- Jack Joseph Puig: mixing

== Charts ==
=== Weekly charts ===
Weekly chart performance for "No Such Thing"
Chart (2001–2003)	Peak position
Australia (ARIA)	28
Netherlands (Single Top 100)	97
New Zealand (Recorded Music NZ)	14
Scottish Singles Sales (Official Charts)	43
UK Singles (Official Charts)	42
US Billboard Hot 100	13
US Adult Alternative Airplay (Billboard)	1
US Adult Contemporary (Billboard)	11
US Adult Pop Airplay (Billboard)	5
US Pop Airplay (Billboard)	8

=== Year-end charts ===
2001 year-end chart performance for "No Such Thing"
Chart (2001)	Position
US Triple-A (Billboard)	50

2002 year-end chart performance for "No Such Thing"
Chart (2002)	Position
Canada Radio (Nielsen BDS)	27
New Zealand (RIANZ)	42
US Billboard Hot 100	42
US Adult Contemporary (Billboard)	23
US Adult Top 40 (Billboard)	7
US Mainstream Top 40 (Billboard)	42
US Triple-A (Billboard)	2

2003 year-end chart performance for "No Such Thing"
Chart (2003)	Position
US Adult Top 40 (Billboard)	98

== Certifications ==
Certifications and sales for "No Such Thing"
Region	Certification	Certified units/sales
Australia (ARIA)	Platinum	70,000^{‡}
New Zealand (RMNZ)	Gold	15,000^{‡}
United States (RIAA)	Platinum	1,000,000^{‡}
^{‡} Sales+streaming figures based on certification alone.

== Release history ==
Release dates and formats for "No Such Thing"
Region	Date	Format(s)	Label(s)	Ref.
United States	June 4, 2001	Triple A radio	Columbia; Aware	
United States	February 4, 2002	Hot adult contemporary radio	Columbia; Aware	
United States	May 7, 2002	Contemporary hit; adult contemporary radio	Columbia; Aware	
Australia	June 10, 2002	CD	Columbia; Aware	
United Kingdom	August 11, 2003	CD	Columbia; Aware	
