= Eddie's Attic =

Music club in Decatur, Georgia

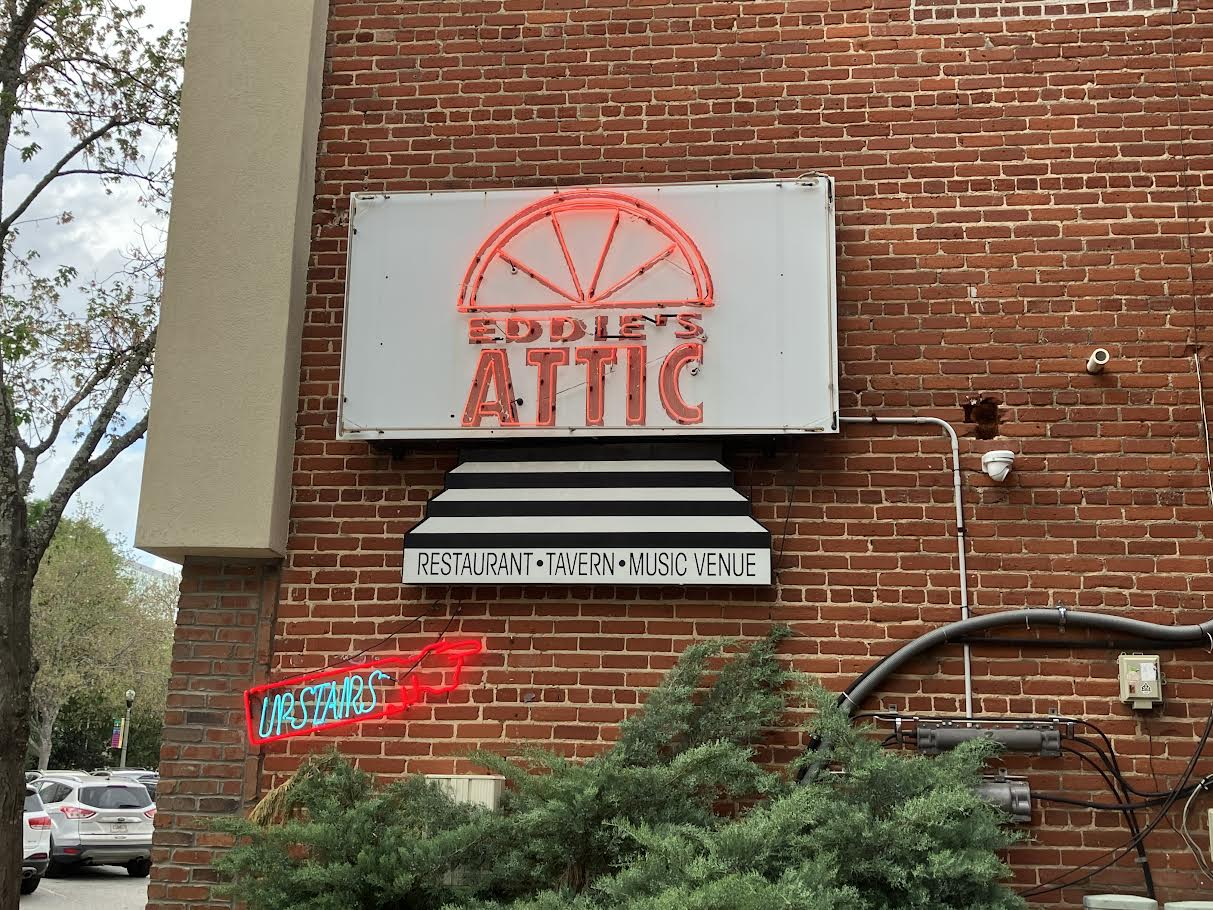
- Interactive map of Eddie's Attic
- Address: 515-B N. McDonough St.
- Location: Decatur, Georgia
- Coordinates: 33°46′26.4″N 84°17′46.9″W
- Owner: Alex Cooley and Dave Mattingly

Construction
- Opened: 1991

Website
- www.eddiesattic.com

Eddie's Attic is a music club in Decatur, Georgia. Founded in 1992 by Eddie Owen, it is a venue for both local musical talent and musicians of some acclaim who often got their start in the Atlanta area. Artists who developed their fanbase at Eddie's Attic include Shawn Mullins, Sugarland, Michelle Malone, Justin Bieber, disappear fear, The Civil Wars, John Mayer, Collective Soul, Ed Roland, and Crystal Bowersox. Eddie's Attic hosts a weekly open mic contest in which performers from around the United States compete; the winners advance to the semi-annual Open Mic Shootout, with a $1,000 grand prize at stake. Past winners of the Shootout include Atlanta's John Mayer, Shawn Mullins, Clay Cook, Jennifer Nettles of Sugarland, Jennifer Daniels, The Brilliant Inventions and Tyler Childers. The contest has been hosted by Matt Arnett since 2012.

In March 2002, Owen sold the business to Todd Van Sickle, (then-husband of Sugarland member Jennifer Nettles) who in turn sold the business to Bob Ephlin in June 2005. In November 2011, Ephlin sold the club to concert promoter Alex Cooley and his business partner Dave Mattingly.

Founder and namesake Eddie Owen now hosts live music at the Red Clay Theatre in Duluth, Georgia.
