= Clay Cook =

American musician (born 1978)

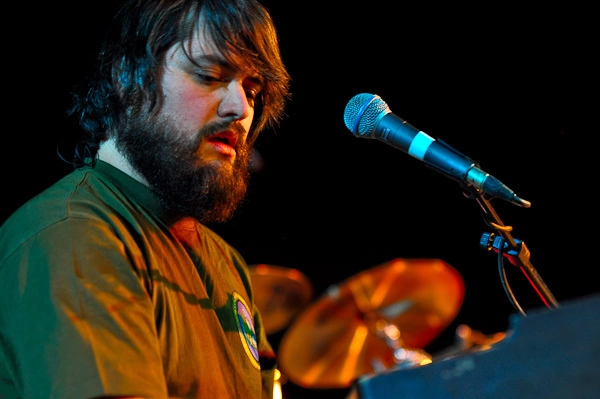
- Cook with the Zac Brown Band in 2010.

Background information
- Born: Douglas Cook; April 20, 1978 (age 48)
- Origin: Snellville, Georgia, U.S.
- Occupations: Songwriter, producer, musician
- Instruments: Guitar; keyboards; vocals
- Years active: 1990—present

Douglas "Clay" Cook (born April 20, 1978) is an American songwriter, producer, and musician who is best known as a member of the Zac Brown Band. After dropping out of college, he and classmate John Mayer formed the band Lo-Fi Masters. Cook co-wrote several songs with Mayer that appear on Mayer's first two releases, Inside Wants Out and Room for Squares, including "No Such Thing", "Comfortable", "Man on the Side" and "Neon". Cook was also a member of The Marshall Tucker Band and Y-O-U.

== Biography ==
Clay Cook attended Smoke Rise Elementary, Tucker High School, and is a graduate of South Gwinnett High School in Snellville, Georgia in 1996. Following this, Cook enrolled at Berklee College of Music in Boston, Massachusetts. While there, Cook met fellow student and singer-songwriter John Mayer. The two of them formed the duo known as Lo-Fi Masters, putting 5 of their songs on an eponymous demo tape which was made at Berklee.

In March 1998 after two years, Cook made the decision to leave Berklee with his bandmate, John Mayer, to move their duo to Atlanta, Georgia, as he was a Georgia native and was aware of the music scene in the city. They began their career in earnest there, quickly making a name for the two-man band. They frequented the local coffeehouse and club circuit in venues including Atlanta's famous venue Eddie's Attic. On their writing partnership, Cook said, "Even back then, my role was more like that of a producer and John was the writer. I'd give input to clean up the rough edges and help him get his vision of the song more clear. For instance, he might have written six verses to a song, and I'd help him get it down to three." Cook and Mayer wrote songs in Atlanta which later appeared on Mayer's record Room for Squares, including: "No Such Thing", "Love Song for No One", and "Neon". Due to musical and creative differences, the two eventually parted ways. Cook moved to California to work in a music shop and later joined The Marshall Tucker Band. Since then he has released two albums of solo material while playing with bands. His albums are entitled The Year I Grew Up and On Mountain Time. Cook has also played with Sugarland and Shawn Mullins.

Cook joined the Zac Brown Band, and their album You Get What You Give was nominated for the 2011 Grammy's, marking Cook's first recorded material that has been nominated. The band won a Grammy Award for Best Country Collaboration with Vocals for "As She's Walking Away" with Alan Jackson. In 2011 Cook announced he had conceptualized his next solo album and planned on working on it throughout the rigorous touring schedule of the Zac Brown Band. Cook released this new album, North Star, on October 22, 2013.

In recent years, Cook has also collaborated with artists to produce music. For example, he produced and mixed albums of Atlanta artists Gareth Asher and the Earthlings, as well as a single for the Atlanta-based hard rock band Echoes End, fronted by Kevin Coughlin, a longtime friend and film composer of the Along Came The Devil Horror film series.

== Discography ==
=== Albums ===
Title	Album details	Peak chart positions	
Title	Album details	US Country	US Heat
Lead Me On	Release date: 2001; Label:	—	—
Self Serving	Release date: 2003; Label: self-released	—	—
Smoke & Mirrors (as Clay Cook & The Torches)	Release date: 2004; Label: Unknown	—	—
Natural Progression (as Clay Cook & The Torches)	Release date: 2005; Label: Unknown	—	—
Year I Grew Up	Release date: August 26, 2008; Label: CDBY	—	—
On Mountain Time	Release date: November 17, 2009; Label: CDBY	—	—
North Star	Release date: October 22, 2013; Label: Southern Ground Artists	—	—
Unobstructed View	Release date: November, 2017; Label: Southern Ground Artists	—	—
