= David LaBruyere =

American songwriter

- Born: New Orleans, Louisiana, U.S.
- Genres: Alternative rock, folk, blues, experimental
- Occupation(s): Songwriter, session musician, bass guitarist
- Instrument: Bass guitar
- Years active: 1986–present
- Website: http://www.davidlabruyere.com/

David LaBruyere is a musician, songwriter, and producer. He is a longtime session musician, he has worked with John Mayer, Michelle Malone, Shawn Mullins, Peter Frampton, Howard Tate, and many other artists.
