= John Mayer 2008 Summer Tour =

2008 concert tour by John Mayer

2008 Summer Tour
- Tour by John Mayer
- Associated album: Continuum
- Start date: July 2, 2008
- End date: August 31, 2008

John Mayer concert chronology
- Europe Summer 2008 (2008); 2008 Summer Tour (2008); Battle Studies World Tour (2009–10)

The John Mayer 2008 Summer Tour was a concert tour by musician John Mayer to support his third album, Continuum.

== Support acts ==
- Colbie Caillat and Brett Dennen – US (first leg for most 2008 Summer Tour dates)
- OneRepublic and Paramore – US (second leg of 2008 Summer Tour)

== Setlist ==
1. "Waiting on the World to Change"
2. "Belief"
3. "Daughters '74"
4. "Bigger than My Body"
5. "Slow Dancing in a Burning Room"
6. "Clarity"
7. "Crossroads"
8. "I Don't Need No Doctor"
9. "Stop This Train"
10. "No Such Thing/Why Georgia"
11. "Stitched Up"
12. "Say"

Encore

1. "3x5"
2. "Vultures"
3. "Gravity"

== Tour dates ==
Date	City	Country	Venue
North America
July 2, 2008	Milwaukee	United States	Summerfest
July 3, 2008	Maryland Heights	United States	Verizon Wireless Amphitheater
July 5, 2008	Noblesville	United States	Verizon Wireless Music Center
July 6, 2008	Rothbury	United States	Rothbury Festival
July 7, 2008	Toronto	Canada	Molson Amphitheatre
July 9, 2008	Wantagh	United States	Nikon at Jones Beach Theater
July 10, 2008	Camden	United States	Susquehanna Bank Center
July 12, 2008	Mansfield	United States	Comcast Center
July 13, 2008	Columbia	United States	Merriweather Post Pavilion
July 15, 2008	Holmdel Township	United States	PNC Bank Arts Center
July 17, 2008	Cuyahoga Falls	United States	Blossom Music Center
July 18, 2008	Tinley Park	United States	First Midwest Bank Amphitheatre
July 20, 2008	Commerce City	United States	Mile High Music Festival
July 21, 2008	West Valley City	United States	USANA Amphitheatre
July 23, 2008	Paso Robles	United States	Paso Robles Event Center
July 25, 2008	Wheatland	United States	Sleep Train Amphitheater
July 26, 2008	Mountain View	United States	Shoreline Amphitheatre
July 27, 2008	Irvine	United States	Verizon Wireless Amphitheatre
July 29, 2008	Chula Vista	United States	Cricket Wireless Amphitheatre
July 30, 2008	Phoenix	United States	Cricket Wireless Pavilion
August 1, 2008	Dallas	United States	Superpages.com Center
August 2, 2008	The Woodlands	United States	Cynthia Woods Mitchell Pavilion
August 19, 2008	Charlotte	United States	Verizon Wireless Amphitheatre
August 20, 2008	Burgettstown	United States	Post-Gazette Pavilion
August 22, 2008	Darien	United States	Darien Lake Performing Arts Center
August 23, 2008	Hartford	United States	New England Dodge Music Center
August 24, 2008	Atlantic City	United States	The Borgata
August 25, 2008	Saratoga Springs	United States	Saratoga Performing Arts Center
August 27, 2008	Raleigh	United States	Time Warner Cable Music Pavilion
August 29, 2008	Alpharetta	United States	Verizon Wireless Amphitheatre
August 30, 2008	Tampa	United States	Ford Amphitheatre
August 31, 2008	West Palm Beach	United States	Cruzan Amphitheatre
