= The Village Sessions =

- The Village Sessions

EP by John Mayer
- Released: December 12, 2006
- Recorded: Late 2004–early 2005
- Studios: The Village Recorder, Los Angeles, California
- Genre: Acoustic
- Labels: Aware; Columbia
- Producers: John Mayer; Chad Franscoviak

John Mayer chronology
Continuum (2006)	The Village Sessions (2006)	Where the Light Is (2008)

The Village Sessions is an EP released by artist John Mayer on December 12, 2006. Collaborators include John Mayer Trio members Steve Jordan and Pino Palladino, along with Ben Harper, Robbie McIntosh, and Ricky Peterson of Mayer's touring band and former producer for Prince albums. The six-song EP contains acoustic and alternate versions of songs found on Mayer's third studio album, Continuum, and his trio's live album, Try!. Mayer co-produced the album with engineer Chad Franscoviak.

Though the EP was released at about the same time as Mayer's single, "Gravity", the song itself does not appear on this EP, much like Mayer's singles "Daughters" and "Bigger than My Body" were not on his live album, As/Is, despite being the current singles at the time of its release. Like the As/Is series before it, The Village Sessions was made available on iTunes, on May 15, 2007.

== Release ==
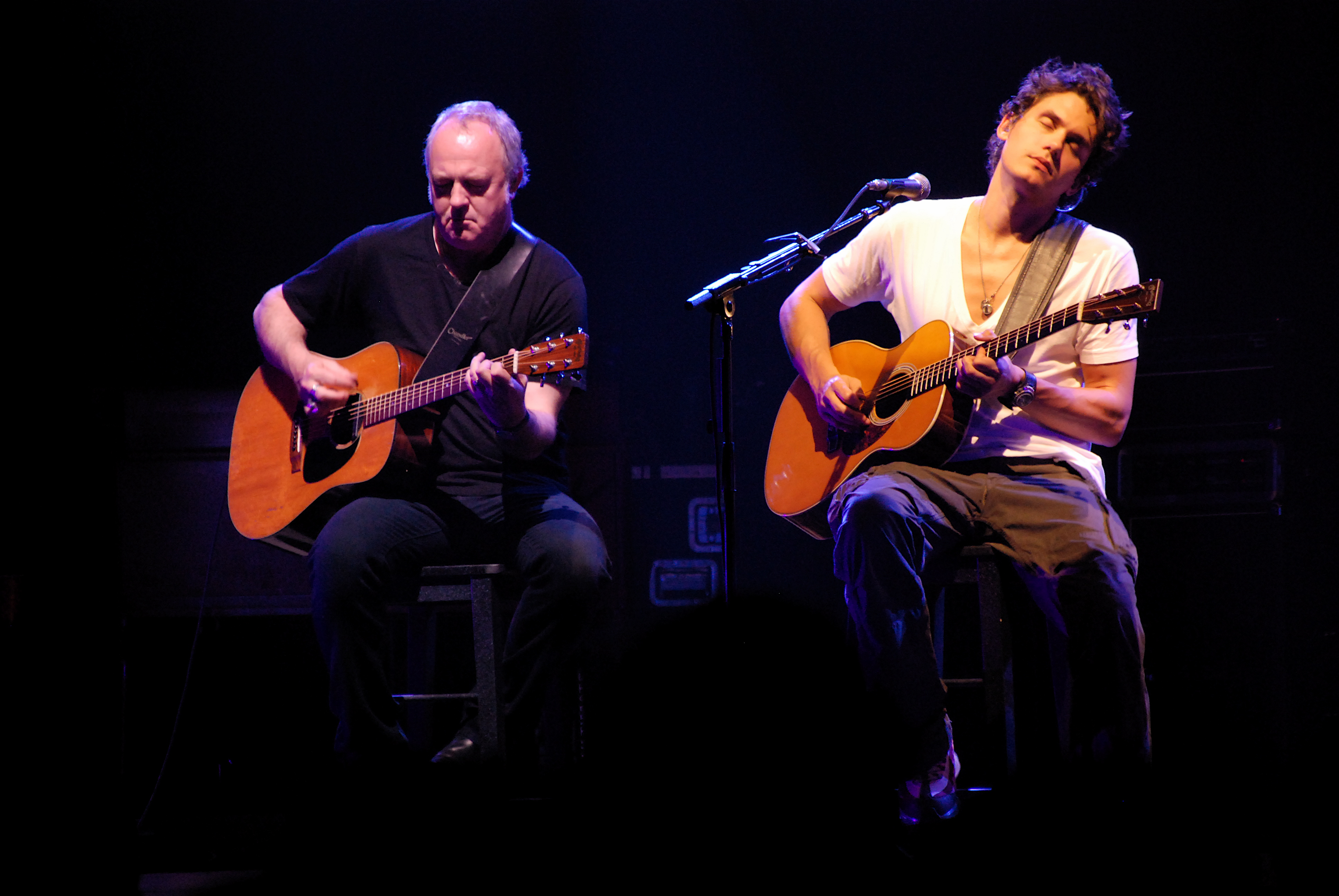
Robbie McIntosh and John Mayer, who perform on all tracks, in 2007

Originally, the EP was only available at indie record stores and at the online Aware Records store in limited quantities. The album was released on December 12, 2006, and copies had sold out on the Aware Store as of December 23, 2006. However, it is now also available on Amazon.com. In May 2007, The Village Sessions was released on iTunes with a special video featuring the making of "In Repair" as heard on Continuum. The video shows the song being recorded within one day.

On December 6, 2007, the acoustic version of "Belief" from "The Village Sessions" was nominated for a Grammy Award in the category of Best Male Pop Vocal Performance, a category that Mayer had previously won three times.

Professional ratings
Review scores
Source	Rating
Blog Critics	link
Okayplayer	link

== Track listing ==
All songs written by John Mayer, except where noted.

1. "Waiting on the World to Change" (Ben Harper version) – 2:51
2. "Belief" (acoustic version) – 3:42
3. "Slow Dancing in a Burning Room" (acoustic version) – 3:52
4. "Good Love is On the Way" (acoustic version) (Mayer, Pino Palladino, Steve Jordan) – 3:24
5. "I'm Gonna Find Another You" (acoustic version) – 2:45
6. "In Repair" (acoustic version) (Mayer, Charlie Hunter) – 5:47

== Personnel ==
Musicians

- John Mayer – vocals, guitar
- Robbie McIntosh – guitar (tracks 2–6)
- Ben Harper – vocals (track 1)
- Steve Jordan – percussion (track 1)
- Pino Palladino – bass (track 1)
- Ricky Peterson – keyboards (track 1)

Technical Personnel

- John Mayer – producer
- Chad Franscoviak – producer (tracks 2–6), engineer
- Steve Jordan – producer (track 1)
- Dave O'Donnell – mixing (tracks 2–6)
- Manny Marroquin – mixing (track 1)
- Jared Robbins – mix assistant (track 1)
