= Dan Smith Will Teach You Guitar =

Advertising campaign in New York City

Dan Smith flyer in a Chelsea deli

Jon Stewart Will Teach You Guitar

Guru Pitka Will Teach You Sitar

Dan Smith Will Teach You Guitar is an ad campaign run in New York City that has resulted in a significant amount of coverage and satire.

Dan Smith, a native of Newton, Massachusetts, posted ads in the New York City area, consisting of a photo of him with his guitar, the headline "Dan Smith Will Teach You Guitar", and a brief description of the experience he offers. Unlike traditional advertisements for guitar lessons, Smith has never included little tear-off attachments containing his contact information at the bottom on any of his advertisements. In 2010, AOL's small business news section covered Smith's success at building up a brand based on his simple, unmistakable message. He was also covered in a 2005 article in The New York Times by Laura Longhine, in which Longhine commended Smith's marketing skills and called him "an excellent teacher", but also mentioned that he refused to have discussions with her over the phone or give an interview after her first lesson.

== Parody ==
- Ménage à Twang has recorded a song as an homage to Smith called "Dan Smith Will Teach Me Guitar".
- On the September 20, 2010 episode of The Daily Show, Jon Stewart showed the audience a bulletin board featuring many of his ads - one of these was a satire that showed a picture of Stewart's head superimposed on Smith's body, that said 'Jon Stewart Will Teach You Guitar'.
- The season three premiere of Bojack Horseman featured a "Clam Smith Will Teach You Guitar" poster in the background of a New York City diner.
- The Mike Myers movie The Love Guru featured a similar ad campaign in the New York area, featuring Myers' character, Guru Pitka, posed as Smith.
- Season 3 Episode 4 of the HBO animated series The Life & Times of Tim included a reference to the campaign in the first segment of the episode, "Super Gay Eduardo".
- Parody posters were posted in New York City to promote the release of John Mayer album Continuum.
- No. 7 Sub Shop in New York City sells a sandwich, "Dan Smith Will Teach You Guitar." It includes turkey, avocado and black bean hummus.
- CollegeHumor made a parody poster with a bitter and angry Smith giving up guitar teaching.
- The Peoples Improv Theater made a parody movie trailer in the vein of a horror movie which can be viewed on YouTube
- Doug Gillard's video for "Face of Smiles", released in mid-February, 2026 features a brief clip of producer Tom Beaujour handing Doug one of the infamous "Dan Smith Will Teach You Guitar" flyers, right before a closeup of Doug's face as the song kicks off. Video link blocked, but available on YouTube as of 2/21/26.
