= Dreaming with a Broken Heart =

Single by John Mayer

from the album Continuum
- Released: July 4, 2007
- Genre: Blues rock; alternative rock
- Length: 4:05
- Label: Aware
- Songwriter: John Mayer
- Producers: John Mayer; Steve Jordan; Sculpture Music Group

John Mayer singles chronology
| "Gravity" (2006) | "Dreaming with a Broken Heart" (2007) | "Say" (2007) |

"Dreaming with a Broken Heart" is a song by John Mayer from his 2006 album Continuum. It was released to US radio and as a digital download single in July 2007.

The single entered the US Billboard Hot 100 chart at its peak position of number 99. It also peaked on the Adult Top 40 at number 8, making it Mayer's eighth single to enter the top 10 on Billboard's Adult Top 40 chart.

Billboard called the song "Another bull's-eye from that rare singer/songwriter who has proved to be a cinch for success."

In October 2007, the song was featured prominently in "The Trey Wiggs Taps Back Episode", a second-season episode of the CW/BET comedy-drama television series The Game.

Mia Michaels choreographed a contemporary routine with Twitch and Kherington to this song in the fourth season of So You Think You Can Dance. Penn Masala covered this song in their seventh album, Panoramic.

== Personnel ==
- John Mayer – vocals, guitar, producer
- Steve Jordan – drums, percussion, producer
- Pino Palladino – bass
- Ricky Peterson – piano
- Chad Franscoviak – engineer
- Michael Brauer – mixing
- Will Hensley – mix assistant

== Cover versions ==
Daniel Evans, a finalist on The X Factor (UK) covered this on his YouTube channel in June 2013 and was subsequently featured on his 2013 EP, "Reflections".

== Charts ==
=== Weekly charts ===
| Chart (2007) | Peak position |
|---|---|
| Canada Hot 100 (Billboard) | 69 |
| Netherlands (Single Top 100) | 96 |
| US Billboard Hot 100 | 99 |
| US Adult Contemporary (Billboard) | 13 |
| US Adult Pop Airplay (Billboard) | 8 |

=== Year-end charts ===
| Chart (2007) | Position |
|---|---|
| US Adult Top 40 (Billboard) | 33 |
| Chart (2008) | Position |
| US Adult Contemporary (Billboard) | 39 |

== Certifications ==
| Region | Certification | Certified units/sales |
|---|---|---|
| United States (RIAA) | Platinum | 1,000,000^{‡} |
^{‡} Sales+streaming figures based on certification alone.
