= List of Billboard Adult Contemporary number ones of 2007 =

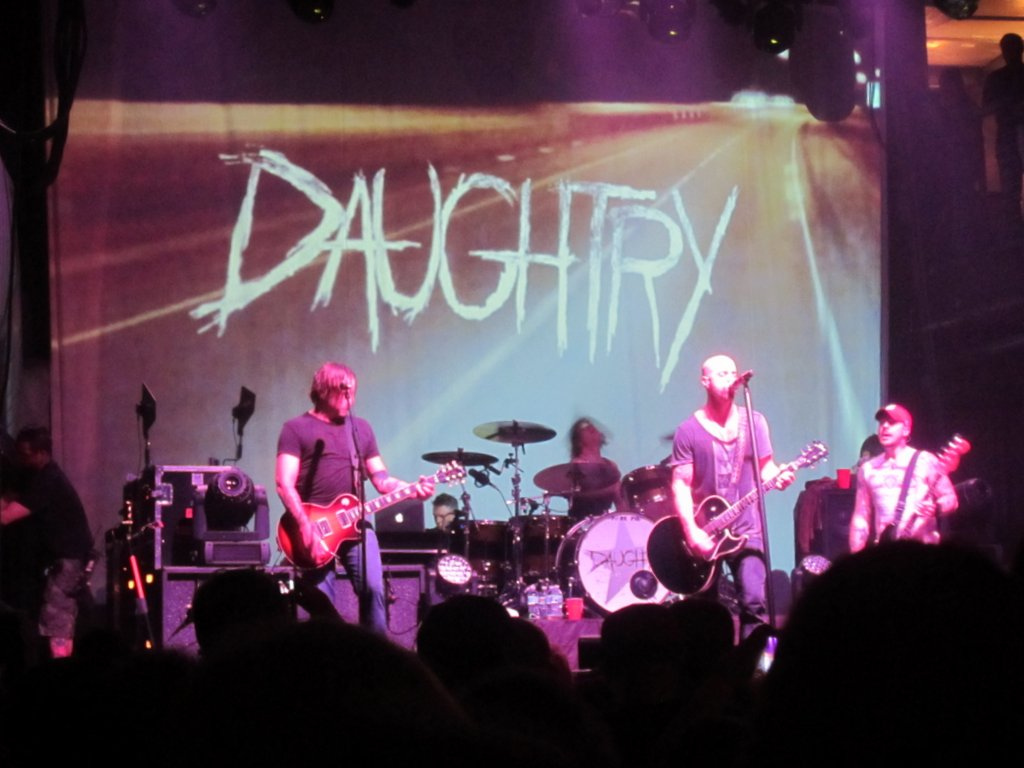
Daughtry's "Home" spent eight consecutive weeks at number one, the longest uninterrupted run atop the chart in 2007.

Adult Contemporary is a chart published by Billboard ranking the top-performing songs in the United States in the adult contemporary music (AC) market. In 2007, 11 different songs topped the chart in 53 issues of the magazine, based on weekly airplay data from radio stations compiled by Nielsen Broadcast Data Systems.

In the first issue of Billboard of the new year, Hall & Oates held the top spot with their version of the Christmas carol "It Came Upon a Midnight Clear", which was in its second week at number one. The following week it was displaced by country music group Rascal Flatts with its version of the song "What Hurts the Most". In the issue dated February 24, John Mayer reached number one with his song "Waiting on the World to Change". Over the next five months, the track would have seven separate runs at number one totalling sixteen weeks in the top spot, the most by any song during the year. Mayer's song was displaced from the top spot once by "Unwritten" by Natasha Bedingfield, twice by "How to Save a Life" by the Fray, and three times by "Chasing Cars" by Snow Patrol, but on each occasion it returned to number one after a single week. The song was displaced at number one for the final time in the issue dated July 28, when "Everything" by Michael Bublé began a three-week run at number one. "Waiting on the World to Change" was Mayer's first AC number one and won the Grammy for Best Male Pop Vocal Performance at the 49th Grammy Awards.

The longest unbroken run at number one in 2007 was eight weeks, achieved by "Home" by Daughtry, the band led by former American Idol finalist Chris Daughtry. The song eventually totalled eleven weeks in the top spot in three runs, all three of which were ended by Fergie's song "Big Girls Don't Cry". The latter song was the only track to top both the AC listing and Billboard's all-genre chart, the Hot 100, in 2007; Fergie had two Hot 100 number ones during the year, but "Big Girls Don't Cry" was not only the only one to also top the AC chart but the sole song by the former Black Eyed Peas singer to enter the AC listing at all. The final two AC number ones of the year were both Christmas-themed, continuing a theme which began in the early 21st century, when stations of the relevant format began devoting their playlists exclusively to seasonal songs in December. In the issue of Billboard dated December 15, Kimberley Locke reached number one with her version of "Frosty the Snowman", and the following week Josh Groban took the top spot with his recording of "I'll Be Home for Christmas". Locke's single week in the top spot meant that she had achieved a number one with a Christmas-themed song in three consecutive Decembers.

== Chart history ==
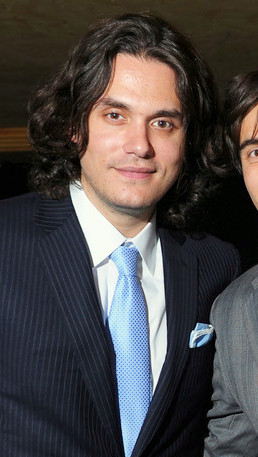
"Waiting on the World to Change" by John Mayer had seven separate spells at number one.

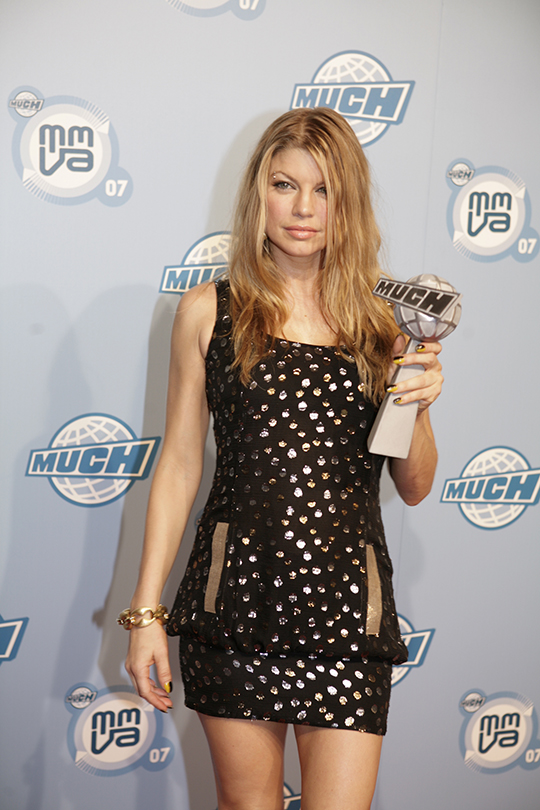
"Big Girls Don't Cry" was a chart-topper for Fergie.

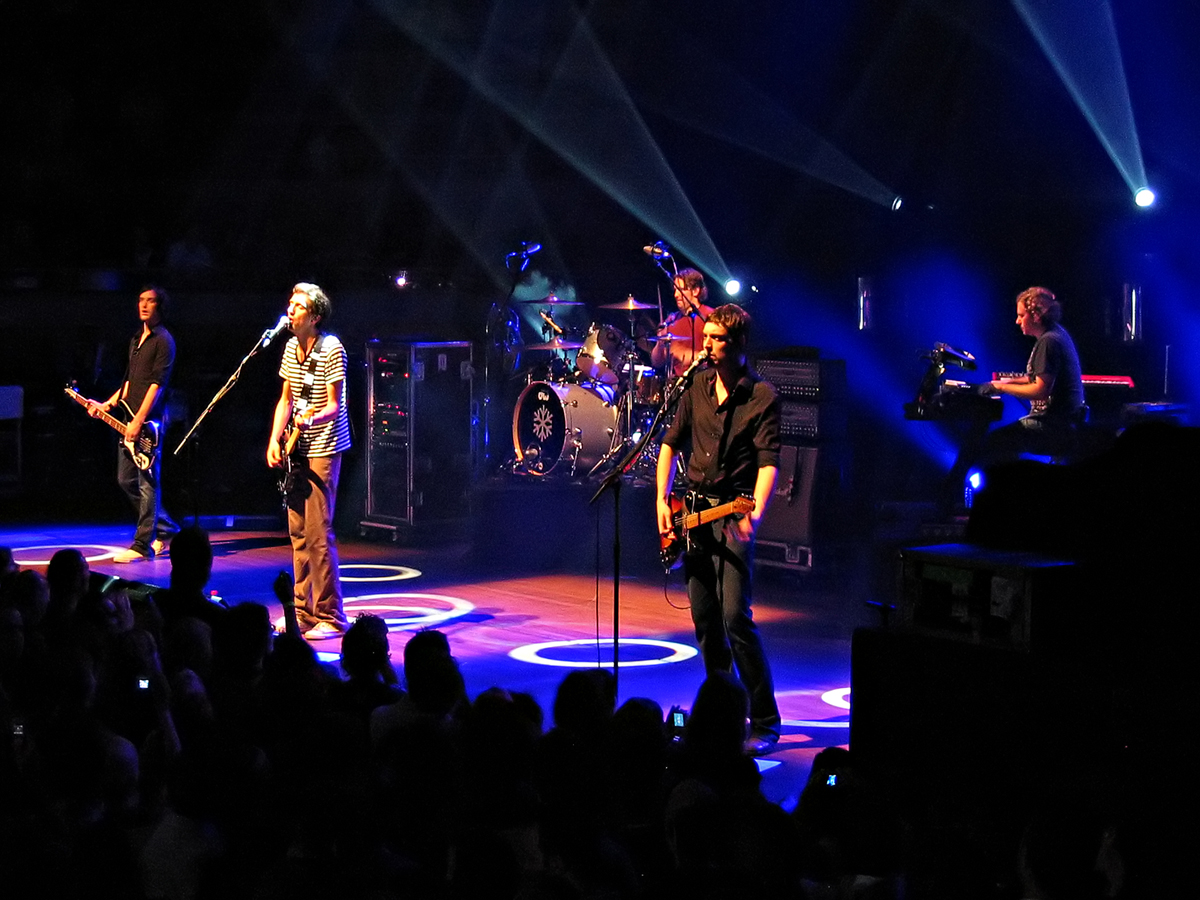
Irish-Scottish rock group Snow Patrol spent three weeks at number one with their song "Chasing Cars".

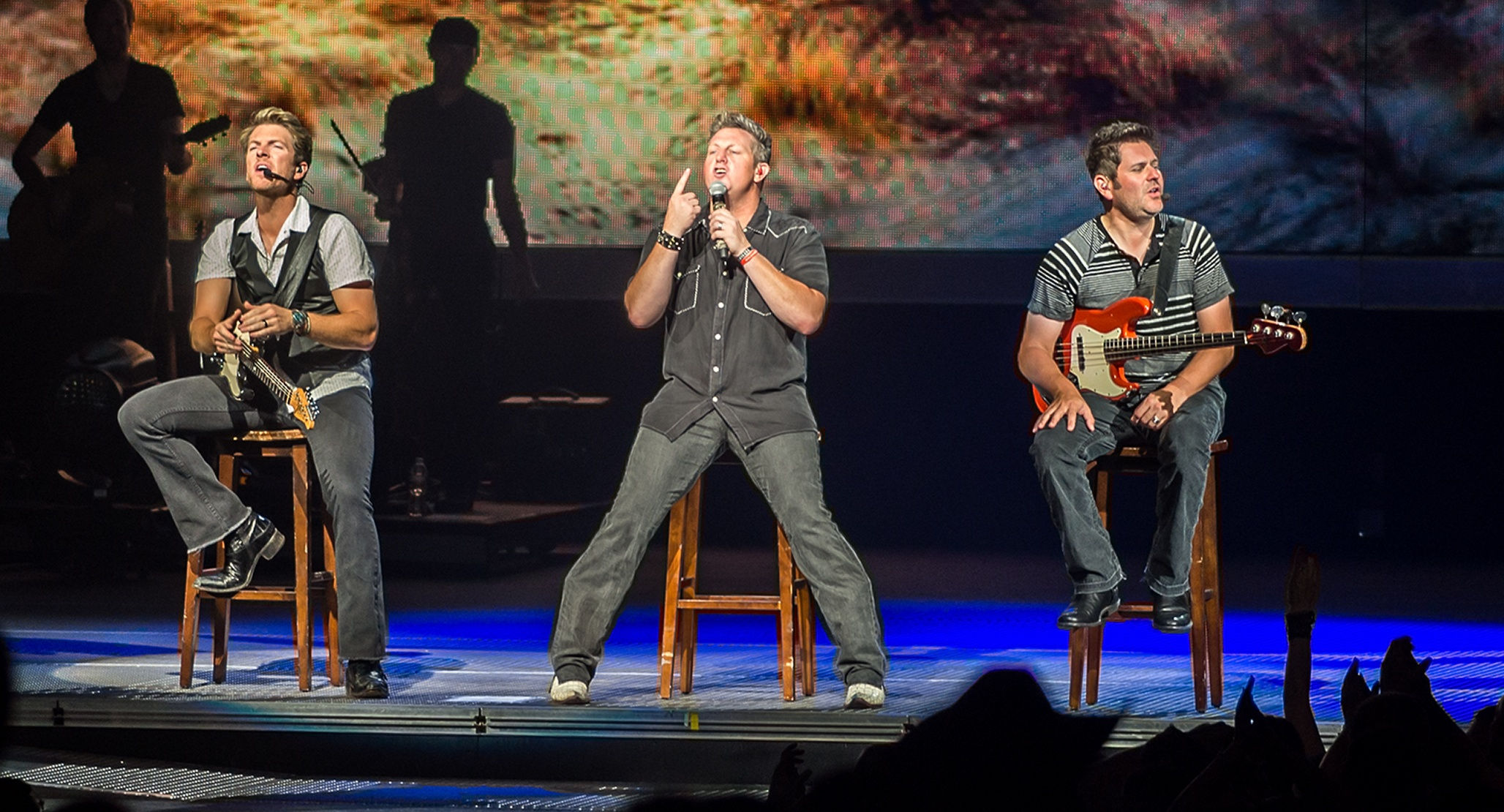
American country trio Rascal Flatts’s cover of "What Hurts The Most" spent a total of five weeks at number one.

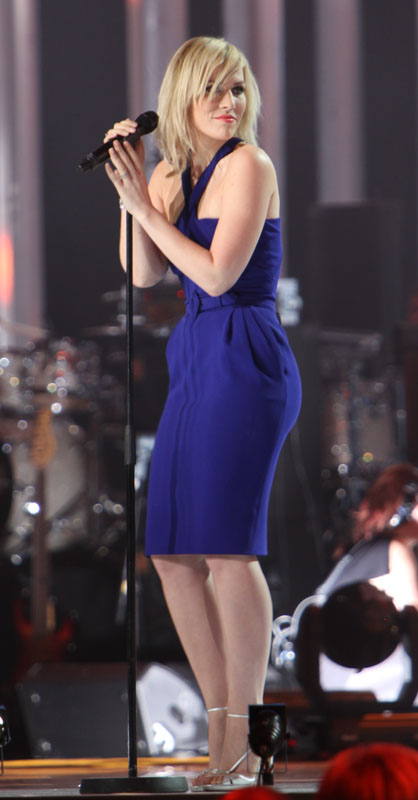
Natasha Bedingfield reached number one with "Unwritten".

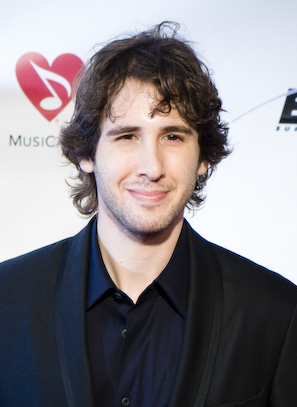
American singer Josh Groban ended the year at number one with his cover of “I'll Be Home for Christmas”

Key
†	Indicates best-performing AC song of 2007

Issue date	Title	Artist(s)	Ref.
January 6	"It Came Upon a Midnight Clear"	Hall & Oates	
January 13	"What Hurts the Most"	Rascal Flatts	
January 20	"What Hurts the Most"	Rascal Flatts	
January 27	"What Hurts the Most"	Rascal Flatts	
February 3	"What Hurts the Most"	Rascal Flatts	
February 10	"What Hurts the Most"	Rascal Flatts	
February 17	"Unwritten"	Natasha Bedingfield	
February 24	"Waiting on the World to Change" †	John Mayer	
March 3	"Unwritten"	Natasha Bedingfield	
March 10	"Waiting on the World to Change" †	John Mayer	
March 17	"Waiting on the World to Change" †	John Mayer	
March 24	"Waiting on the World to Change" †	John Mayer	
March 31	"Waiting on the World to Change" †	John Mayer	
April 7	"Waiting on the World to Change" †	John Mayer	
April 14	"Waiting on the World to Change" †	John Mayer	
April 21	"How to Save a Life"	The Fray	
April 28	"Waiting on the World to Change" †	John Mayer	
May 5	"How to Save a Life"	The Fray	
May 12	"Waiting on the World to Change" †	John Mayer	
May 19	"Waiting on the World to Change" †	John Mayer	
May 26	"Waiting on the World to Change" †	John Mayer	
June 2	"Chasing Cars"	Snow Patrol	
June 9	"Waiting on the World to Change" †	John Mayer	
June 16	"Chasing Cars"	Snow Patrol	
June 23	"Waiting on the World to Change" †	John Mayer	
June 30	"Waiting on the World to Change" †	John Mayer	
July 7	"Chasing Cars"	Snow Patrol	
July 14	"Waiting on the World to Change" †	John Mayer	
July 21	"Waiting on the World to Change" †	John Mayer	
July 28	"Everything"	Michael Bublé	
August 4	"Everything"	Michael Bublé	
August 11	"Everything"	Michael Bublé	
August 18	"Home"	Daughtry	
August 25	"Home"	Daughtry	
September 1	"Home"	Daughtry	
September 8	"Home"	Daughtry	
September 15	"Home"	Daughtry	
September 22	"Home"	Daughtry	
September 29	"Home"	Daughtry	
October 6	"Home"	Daughtry	
October 13	"Big Girls Don't Cry"	Fergie	
October 20	"Home"	Daughtry	
October 27	"Home"	Daughtry	
November 3	"Big Girls Don't Cry"	Fergie	
November 10	"Big Girls Don't Cry"	Fergie	
November 17	"Big Girls Don't Cry"	Fergie	
November 24	"Home"	Daughtry	
December 1	"Big Girls Don't Cry"	Fergie	
December 8	"Big Girls Don't Cry"	Fergie	
December 15	"Frosty the Snowman"	Kimberley Locke	
December 22	"I'll Be Home for Christmas"	Josh Groban	
December 29	"I'll Be Home for Christmas"	Josh Groban	

== See also ==
- 2007 in music
