= Slow Dancing in a Burning Room =

Song by John Mayer

from the album Continuum
- Released: 2006
- Recorded: 2006
- Genre: Blues rock; soft rock
- Length: 4:02 (album version)
- Label: Aware; Columbia; Sony
- Songwriter: John Mayer
- Producers: Steve Jordan; John Mayer

"Slow Dancing in a Burning Room" is a song by John Mayer from the 2006 album Continuum. Although it was not one of the singles released from the album, it is widely regarded as one of Mayer's best songs; the track has also become one of his most commercially successful tracks. The song reached number 10 as its highest radio airplay position in Indonesia.

== Reviews ==
The song has been positively reviewed; Stereogum describes it as "laced with Clapton-esque guitar lines". and Crypticrock describes it as "emotionally driven and with an impassioned guitar solo which is sultry and somber and lends perfectly to the image of a dying relationship". The Daily Evergreen described "Slow Dancing in a Burning Room" as Continuum's masterpiece, with an impeccable guitar solo.

"Slow Dancing in a Burning Room" is regarded as Mayer's best song by Billboard, as his fourth-best song by Blues Rock Review and his second-best song by Marie Claire.

== Commercial performance ==
Despite never having been released as a single, the song has been certified platinum in the United States, silver in the UK and gold in Denmark.

== Released versions ==
The song was also released in an acoustic version on the EP The Village Sessions and on the live album Where the Light Is: John Mayer Live in Los Angeles. The official Vevo video, however, uses the live version of the song from the online concert series Live on Letterman.

== Personnel ==
- John Mayer – vocals, guitar, producer
- Steve Jordan – drums, percussion, producer
- Pino Palladino – bass
- Chad Franscoviak, Joe Ferla – engineers
- Manny Marroquin – mixing
- Jared Robbins – mix assistant

== Cover versions ==
• Country music singer Riley Green released a cover of the song for Valentines day as a part of Spotify Singles on February 5, 2025.

• Singer-songwriter Ernest released a cover of the song on his third studio album Nashville, Tennessee in 2024.

• Country music singer Hudson Westbrook covered the song on the Country Central YouTube channel in July 2025.

• K-pop singer Rosé covered the song live in 2021; Mayer stated he found the interpretation "gorgeous".
