= 2008 Summer Tour =

2008 summer tour may refer to:

- American Idols LIVE! Tour 2008
- John Mayer 2008 Summer Tour
- Sakis Rouvas Summer Tour 2008
