= All About the Love Again =

2009 single by Stevie Wonder

Single by Stevie Wonder

from the album Change Is Now: Renewing America's Promise
- Released: 2009
- Genre: Pop; R&B
- Length: 5:34 (album version); 4:03 (single version)
- Label: Motown
- Songwriter(s): Stevie Wonder
- Producer(s): Stevie Wonder

Stevie Wonder singles chronology
"Shelter in the Rain" (2006)	"All About the Love Again" (2009)	"Only One" (2013)

"All About the Love Again" is a 2009 single by American R&B artist Stevie Wonder.

Stevie Wonder began writing the song in the 1970s and was struck by what he called its catchy melody. He was inspired to finish it after Barack Obama's campaign message of hope and change during the 2008 presidential election. Wonder debuted the song as the final performance of the 2009 Grammy Awards. The song itself was praised by Hits Daily Double as "an uplifting anthem for our current period of uncertainty and hardship," though the performance itself was panned by outlets including Spin and the Orange Country Register.

Wonder later performed "All About the Love Again" at the 2009 inauguration of Barack Obama, and the song was the lead single off the inauguration CD Change Is Now: Renewing America’s Promise. This recording of the song had a "futuristic" effect on Wonder's voice. The Philadelphia Inquirer praised it as a standout of the CD: "the most uplifting piece of songcraft he's delivered since that 'Happy Birthday' homage to Nelson Mandela."

Wonder also performed the song on American Idol, Neighborhood Ball, and The Ellen DeGeneres Show. Later, in 2010, he told CNN's Larry King that he was particularly disappointed the song did not become more of a hit.

"All About the Love Again" was nominated for Best Male Pop Vocal Performance at The 52nd Annual Grammy Awards of 2010.
