= Grammy Award for Best Pop Vocal Album =

Music award for quality pop music albums

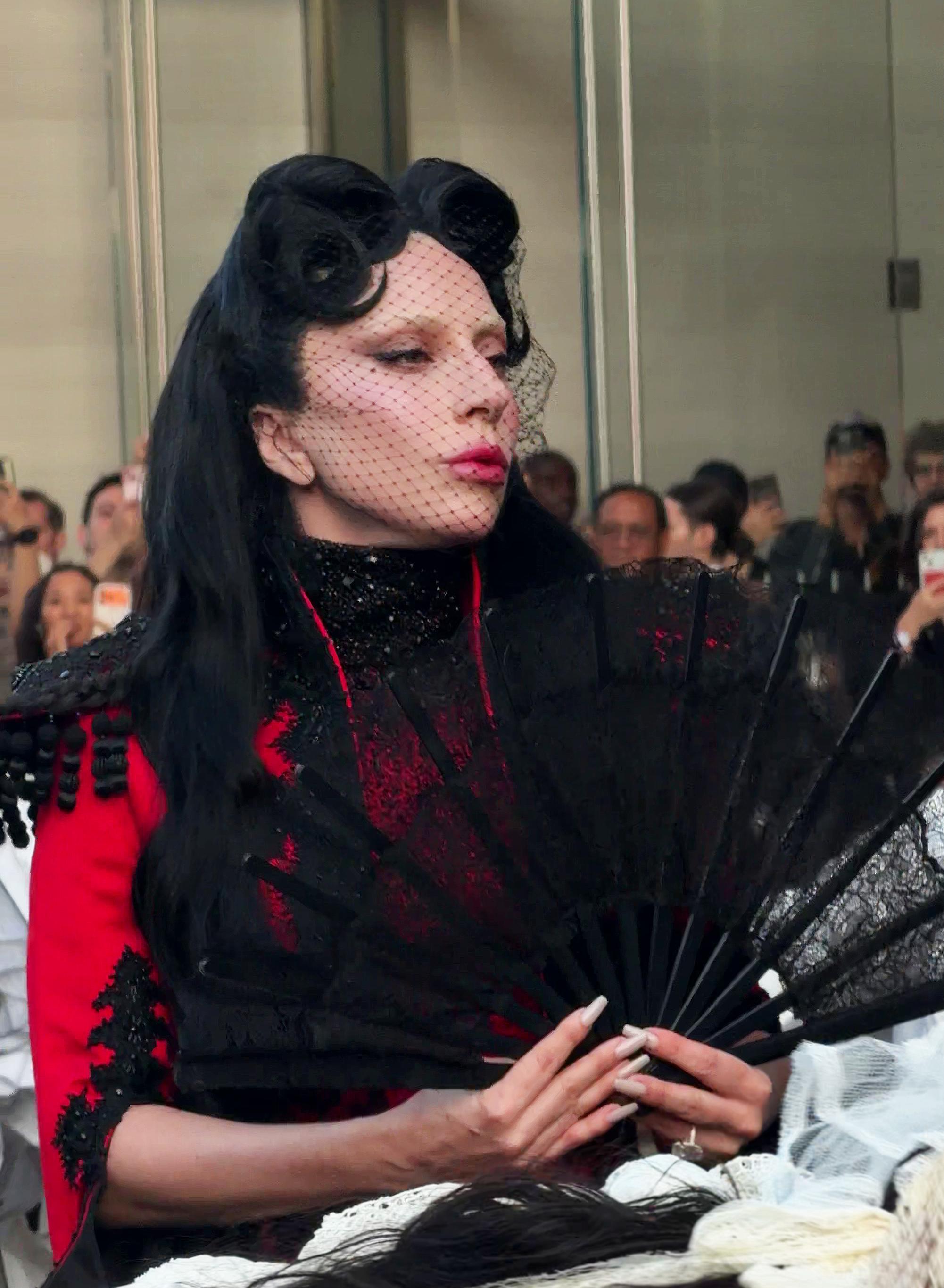
- Mayhem by Lady Gaga is the most recent recipient.
- Awarded for: Quality vocal pop music albums
- Country: United States
- Presented by: National Academy of Recording Arts and Sciences
- First award: 1968
- Currently held by: Lady Gaga – Mayhem (2026)

Highlights
- Most wins: Adele, Kelly Clarkson, Lady Gaga, Taylor Swift (2)
- Most nominations: Ariana Grande (7)
- Website: grammy.com

The Grammy Award for Best Pop Vocal Album is an honor presented at the Grammy Awards, a ceremony that was established in 1958 and originally called the Gramophone Awards, to recording artists for quality vocal pop music albums. Awards in several categories are distributed annually by the National Academy of Recording Arts and Sciences of the United States to "honor artistic achievement, technical proficiency and overall excellence in the recording industry, without regard to album sales or chart position."

The honor was first presented in 1968 at the 10th Grammy Awards as Best Contemporary Album to The Beatles for Sgt. Pepper's Lonely Hearts Club Band. The category was then discontinued until 1995 where it emerged with the new name Best Pop Album. In 2001, the category became known as Best Pop Vocal Album. According to the category description guide for the 52nd Grammy Awards, the award is presented to artists that perform "albums containing at least 51% playing time of newly recorded pop vocal tracks."

From 1996 to 2026 the Grammy was awarded to the artist and to the producer, mixer and (mastering) engineer (if other than the artist), provided they worked on more than 50% of playing time on the album. A songwriter was added to the list of statuette winners from 2027; they should also have worked on at least 50% of new material on the winning album. The Academy has awarded no statuettes to producers and engineers/mixers for some albums, as no producer or engineer/mixer worked on at least 50% of playing time (see e.g. Adel's 21).

Adele, Kelly Clarkson, Lady Gaga and Taylor Swift are the only two-time winners of this award, and Clarkson was the first to win twice. Ariana Grande lead all performers with seven nominations. Engineer Serben Ghenea won seven awards (as of 2026).

== Recipients ==
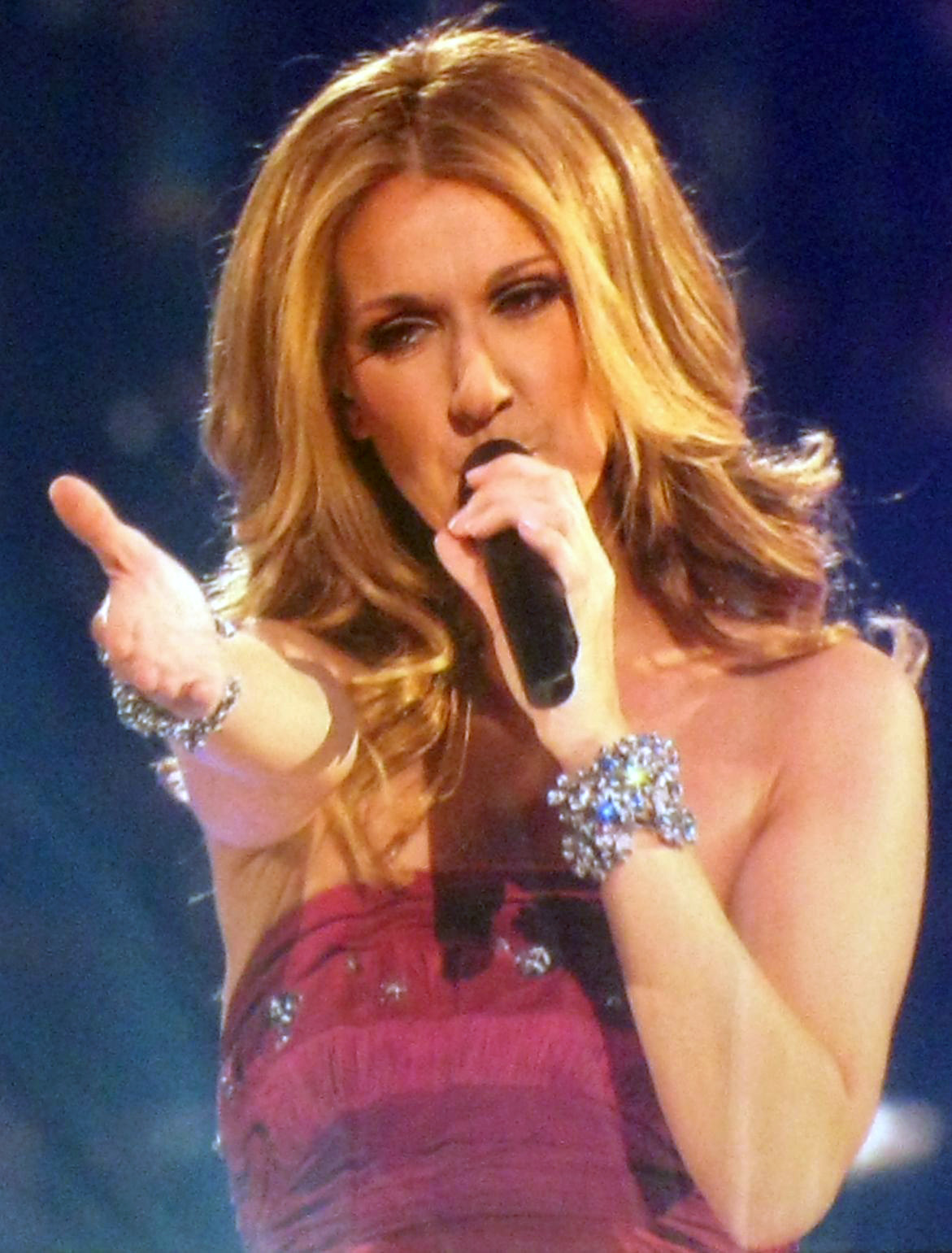
Celine Dion's Falling into You, the 1997 winner, also won Album of the Year.

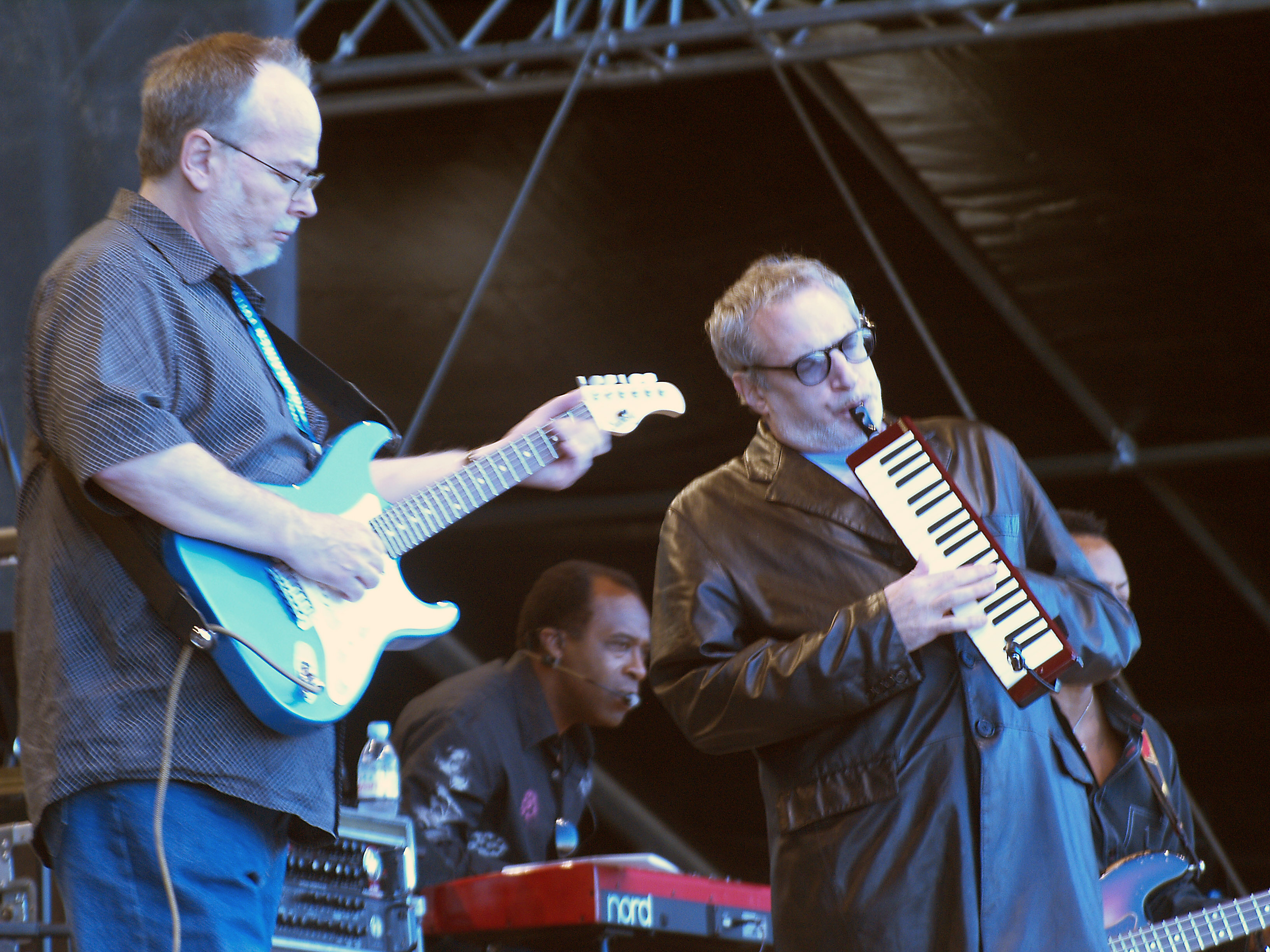
Steely Dan's Two Against Nature, the 2001 winner, also won Album of the Year.

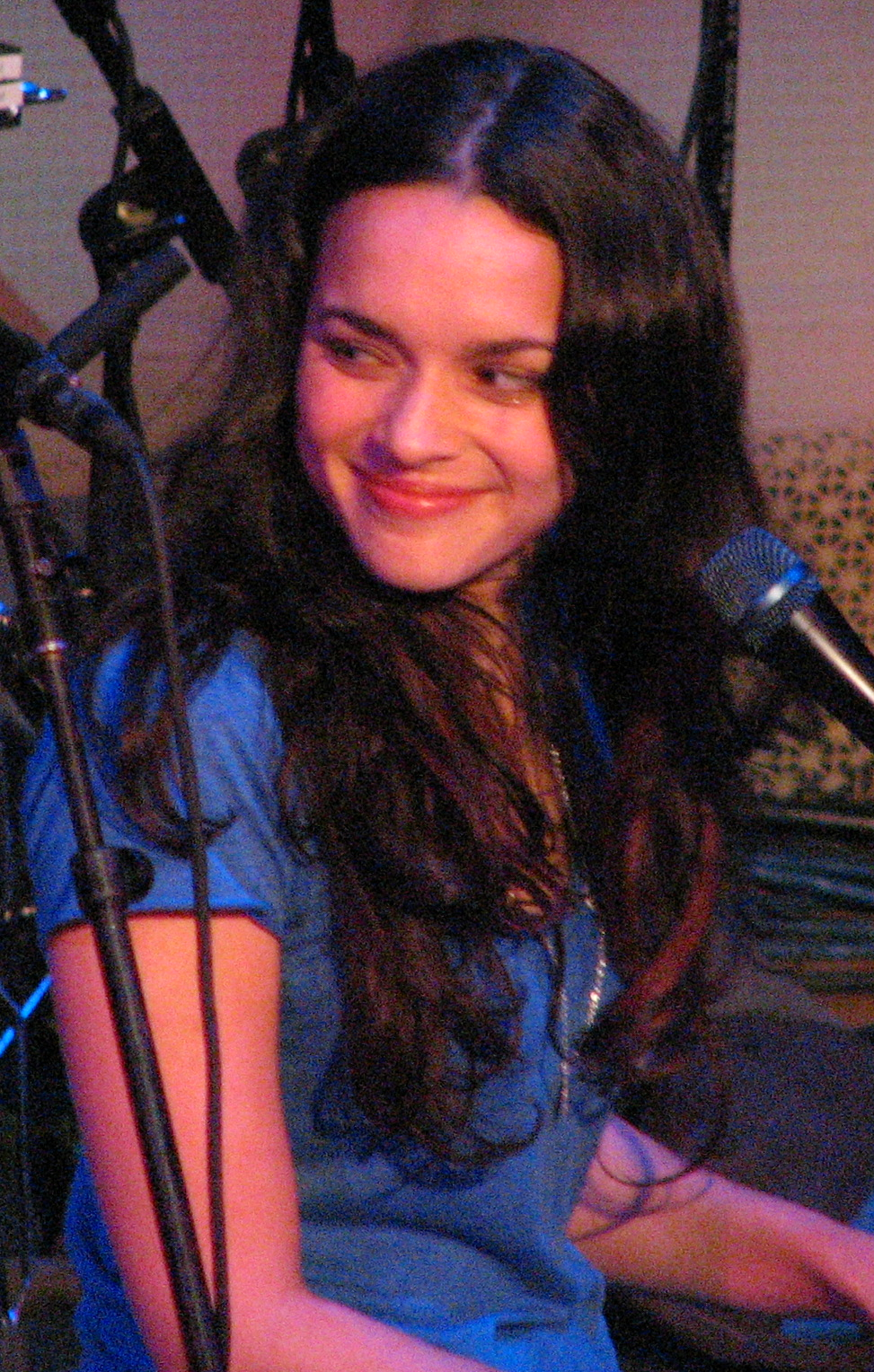
Norah Jones' debut album, Come Away with Me, won this award and Album of the Year in 2003.

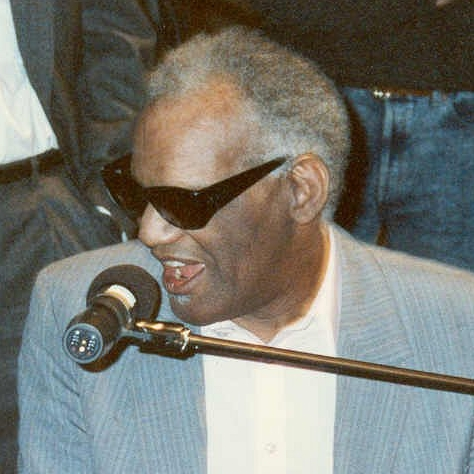
Ray Charles' final album, Genius Loves Company, won this award and Album of the Year in 2005.

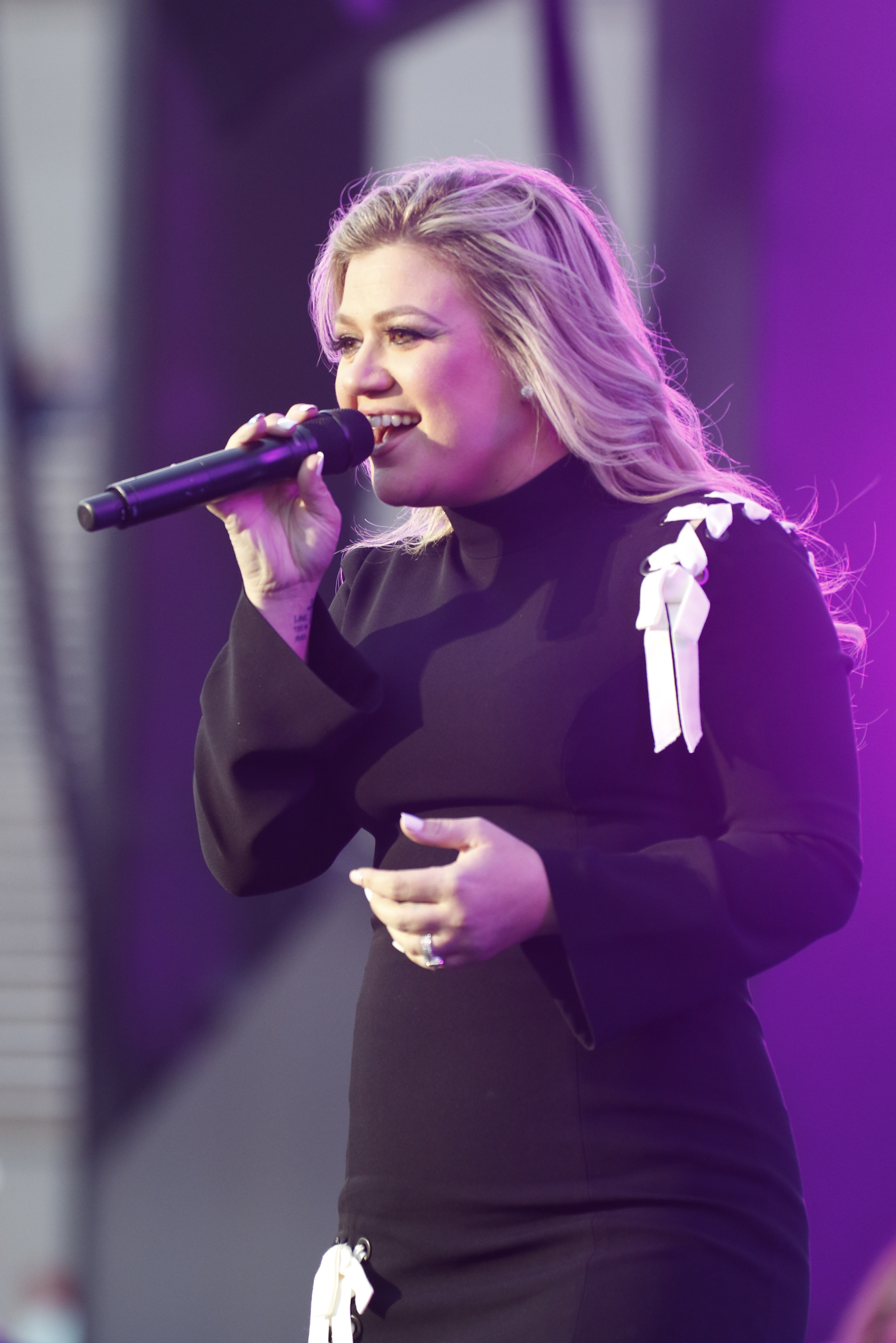
Six-time nominee Kelly Clarkson is the first artist to win this award twice. Breakaway won in 2006; Stronger won in 2013.

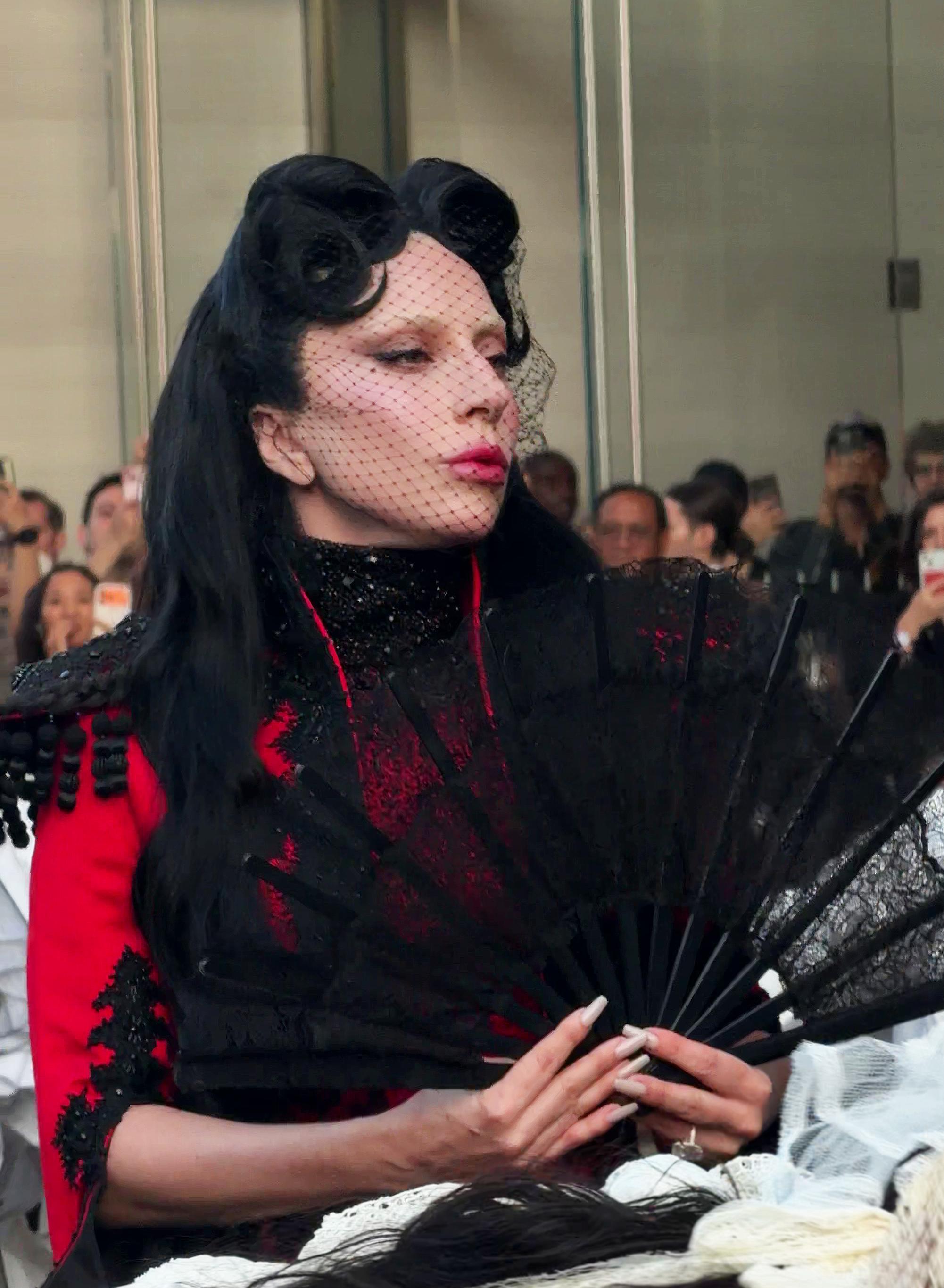
Two-time winner and five-time nominee Lady Gaga, won for The Fame Monster in 2011 and for Mayhem in 2026. Both albums were nominated for Album of the Year.

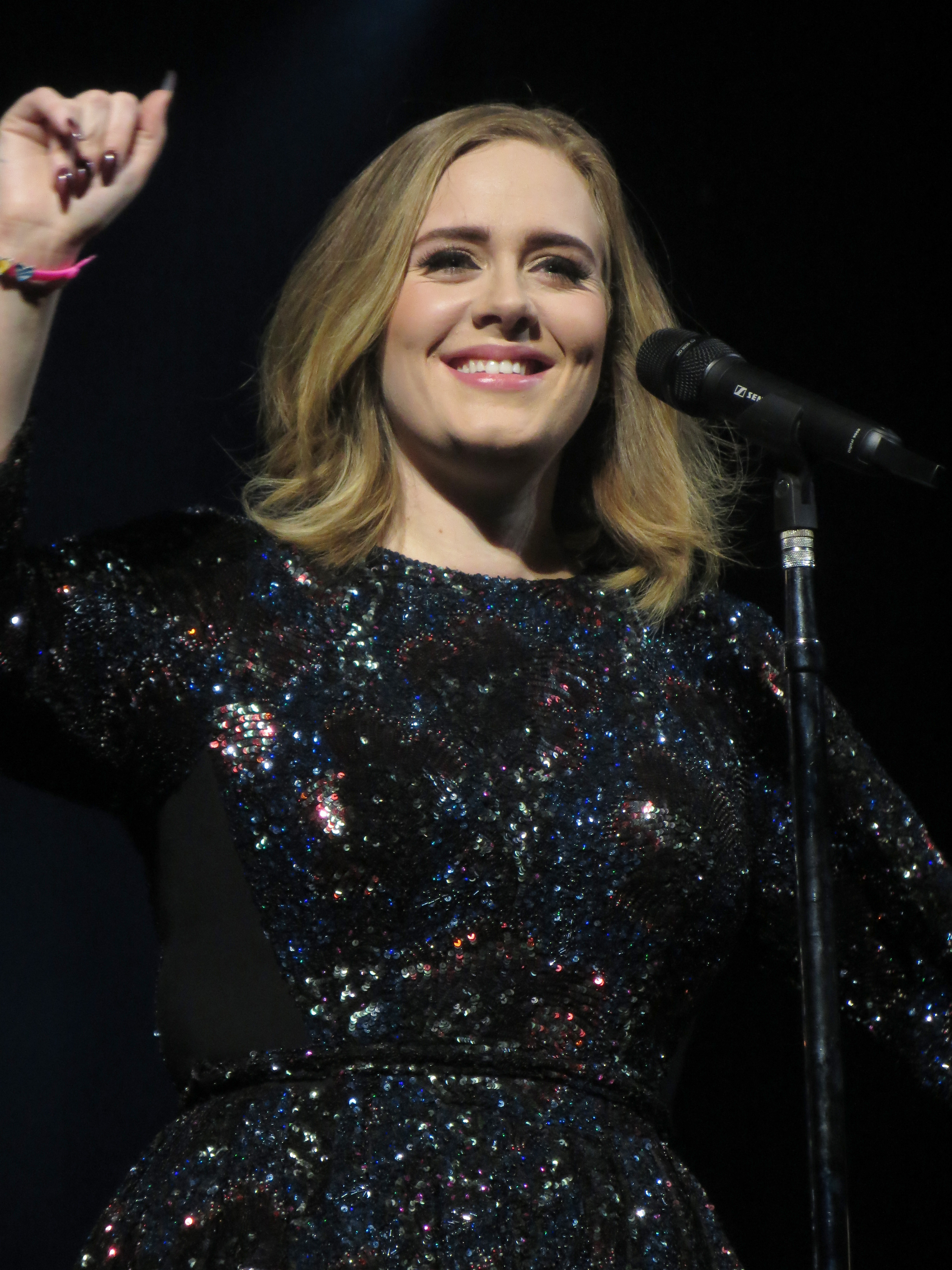
Adele has won this award twice: for 21 in 2012, and for 25 in 2017. Both albums also won Album of the Year.

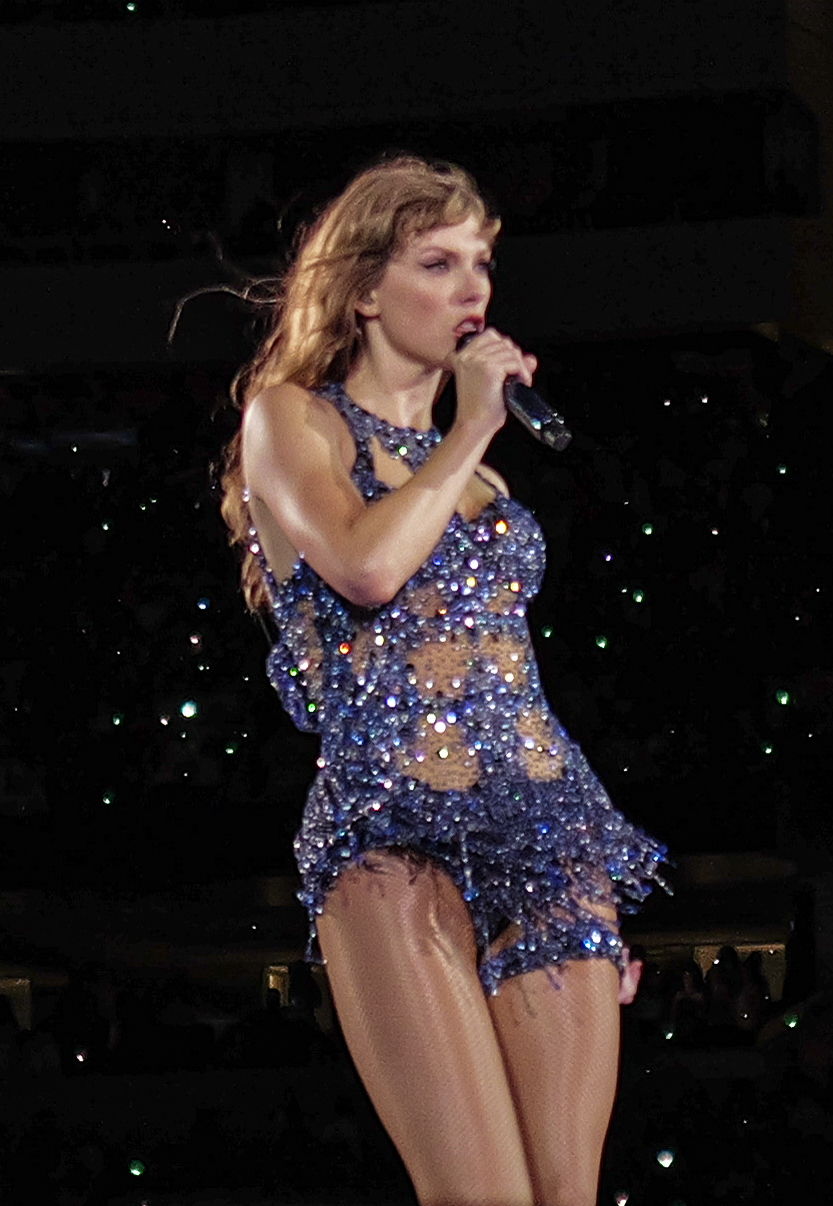
Two-time winner and six-time nominee Taylor Swift, won for 1989 in 2016 and for Midnights in 2024. Both albums also won Album of the Year.

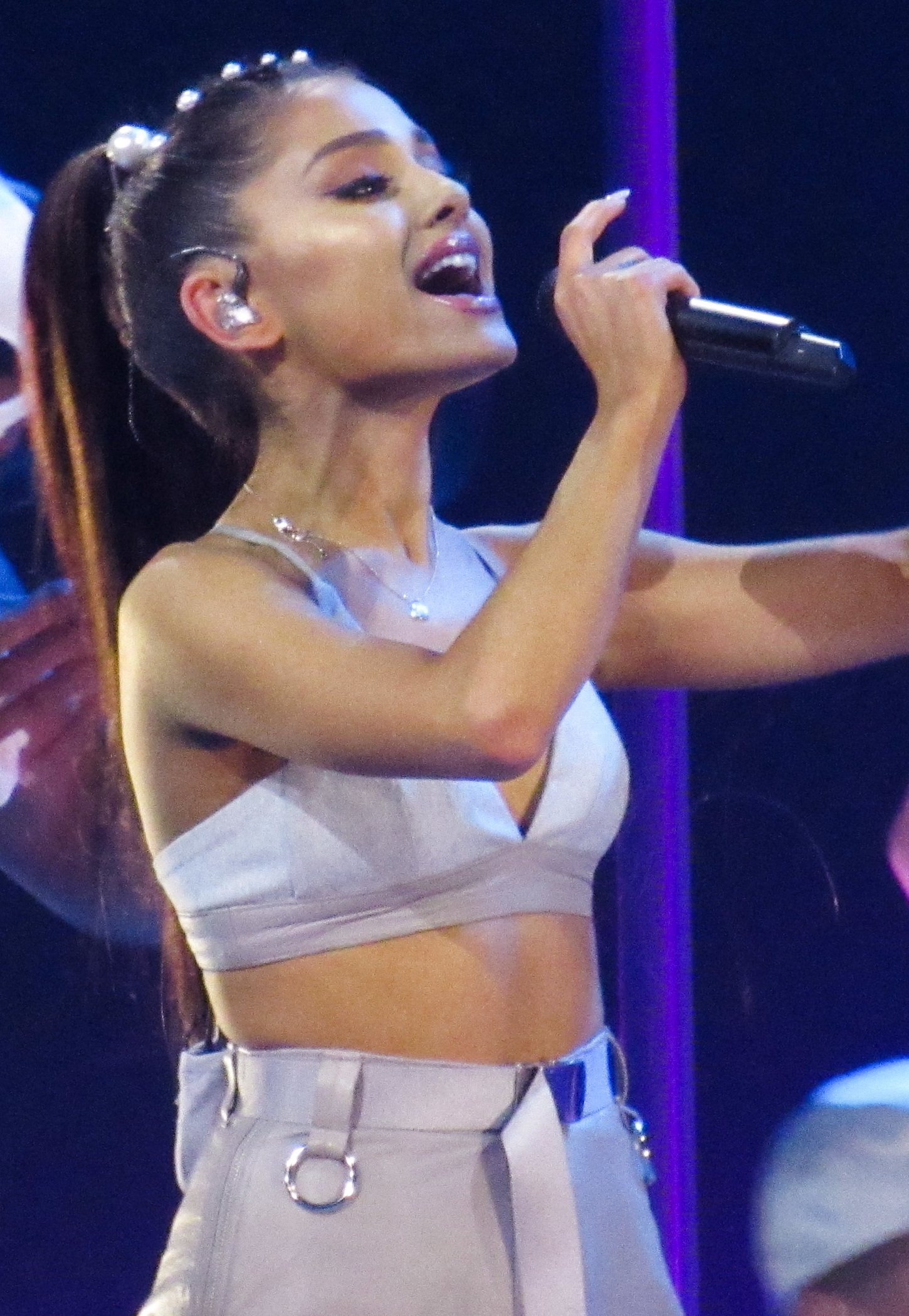
Ariana Grande is the most nominated artist with seven, and won it in 2019 for Sweetener.

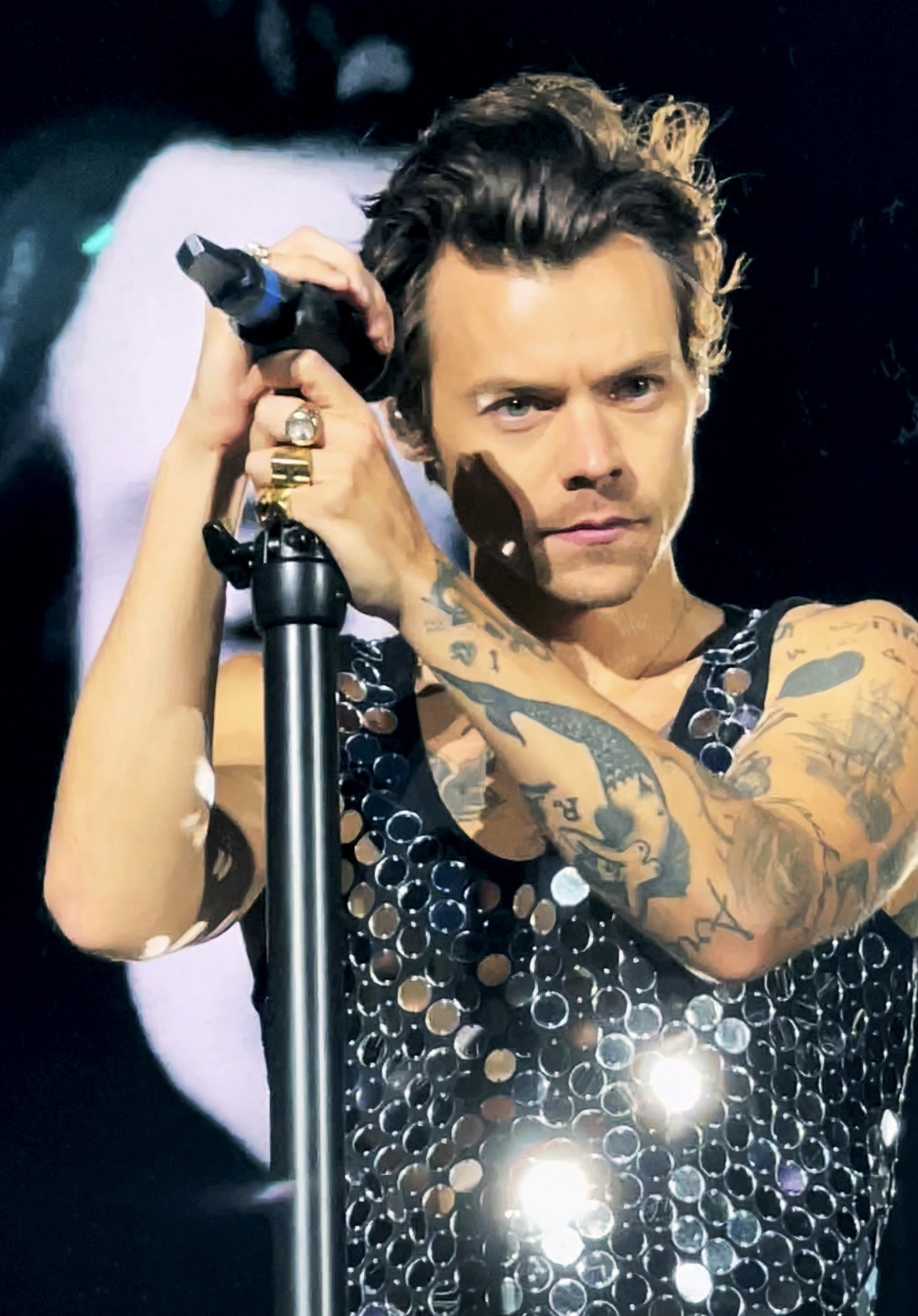
Harry Styles won this award and has also won Album of the Year for Harry's House in 2023.

=== 1960s ===
Year	Work	Artist
1968
1968	Sgt. Pepper's Lonely Hearts Club Band	The Beatles
1968	Insight Out	The Association
1968	It Must Be Him	Vikki Carr
1968	Ode to Billie Joe	Bobbie Gentry
1968	Up, Up and Away	The 5th Dimension

=== 1990s ===
Year	Work	Artist	Winning producer/engineer
1995
1995	Longing in Their Hearts	Bonnie Raitt	
1995	I Love Everybody	Lyle Lovett	
1995	Seal	Seal	
1995	The Sign	Ace of Base	
1995	The Three Tenors in Concert 1994	José Carreras, Plácido Domingo and Luciano Pavarotti with Zubin Mehta	
1996
1996	Turbulent Indigo	Joni Mitchell	(Larry Klein, producer)
1996	Bedtime Stories	Madonna	
1996	Daydream	Mariah Carey	
1996	Hell Freezes Over	Eagles	
1996	Medusa	Annie Lennox	
1997
1997	Falling into You	Celine Dion	
1997	A Few Small Repairs	Shawn Colvin	
1997	Mercury Falling	Sting	
1997	New Beginning	Tracy Chapman	
1997	Secrets	Toni Braxton	
1998
1998	Hourglass	James Taylor	(Frank Filipetti, producer/engineer/mixer)
1998	The Dance	Fleetwood Mac	
1998	Surfacing	Sarah McLachlan	
1998	This Fire	Paula Cole	
1998	Travelling Without Moving	Jamiroquai	
1999
1999	Ray of Light	Madonna	William Orbit, producer; Jon Ingoldsby, David Reitzas & Pat McCarthy, engineers/mixers
1999	The Dirty Boogie	Brian Setzer Orchestra	
1999	Left of the Middle	Natalie Imbruglia	
1999	Let's Talk About Love	Celine Dion	
1999	Pilgrim	Eric Clapton	

=== 2000s ===
Year	Work	Artist	Winning producer/engineer
2000
2000	Brand New Day	Sting	Kipper, producer; Neil Dorfsman & Simon Osborne, engineers/mixers
2000	Believe	Cher	
2000	Millennium	Backstreet Boys	
2000	Mirrorball	Sarah McLachlan	
2000	Ricky Martin	Ricky Martin	
2001
2001	Two Against Nature	Steely Dan	Not listed
2001	Inside Job	Don Henley	
2001	Music	Madonna	
2001	No Strings Attached	*NSYNC	
2001	Oops!... I Did It Again	Britney Spears	
2002
2002	Lovers Rock	Sade	Mike Pela, producer
2002	All for You	Janet Jackson	
2002	Celebrity	*NSYNC	
2002	Songs from the West Coast	Elton John	
2002	Whoa, Nelly!	Nelly Furtado	
2003
2003	Come Away with Me	Norah Jones	Jay Newland & Arif Mardin, producers; S. Husky Hölskulds & Jay Newland, engineers/mixers
2003	Britney	Britney Spears	
2003	Let Go	Avril Lavigne	
2003	Missundaztood	Pink	
2003	Rock Steady	No Doubt	
2004
2004	Justified	Justin Timberlake	Pharrell Williams & Chad Hugo, producers; Andrew Coleman & Serben Ghenea, engineers/mixers
2004	Bare	Annie Lennox	
2004	Brainwashed	George Harrison	
2004	Motown	Michael McDonald	
2004	Stripped	Christina Aguilera	
2005
2005	Genius Loves Company	Ray Charles and Various Artists	John R. Burk, producer; Al Schmitt, engineer/mixer
2005	Afterglow	Sarah McLachlan	
2005	Brian Wilson Presents Smile	Brian Wilson	
2005	Feels like Home	Norah Jones	
2005	Mind Body & Soul	Joss Stone	
2006
2006	Breakaway	Kelly Clarkson	Clive Davis, producer; Serben Ghenea, engineer/mixer
2006	Chaos and Creation in the Backyard	Paul McCartney	
2006	Extraordinary Machine	Fiona Apple	
2006	Love. Angel. Music. Baby.	Gwen Stefani	
2006	Wildflower	Sheryl Crow	
2007
2007	Continuum	John Mayer	Steve Jordan, producer; Joe Ferla, Chad Franscoviak & Michael H. Brauer, engineers/mixers
2007	Back to Basics	Christina Aguilera	
2007	Back to Bedlam	James Blunt	
2007	FutureSex/LoveSounds	Justin Timberlake	
2007	The River in Reverse	Elvis Costello and Allen Toussaint	
2008
2008	Back to Black	Amy Winehouse	Mark Ronson, producer; Tom Elmhirst & Samuel "Vaughan" Merrick, engineers/mixers
2008	It Won't Be Soon Before Long	Maroon 5	
2008	Lost Highway	Bon Jovi	
2008	Memory Almost Full	Paul McCartney	
2008	The Reminder	Feist	
2009
2009	Rockferry	Duffy	Not listed
2009	Covers	James Taylor	
2009	Detours	Sheryl Crow	
2009	Long Road Out of Eden	Eagles	
2009	Spirit	Leona Lewis	

=== 2010s ===
Year	Work	Artist	Winning producer/engineer
2010
2010	The E.N.D.	Black Eyed Peas	Not listed
2010	All I Ever Wanted	Kelly Clarkson	
2010	Breakthrough	Colbie Caillat	
2010	The Fray	The Fray	
2010	Funhouse	Pink	
2011
2011	The Fame Monster	Lady Gaga	RedOne, producer; Dave Russell & Robert Orton, engineers/mixers
2011	Battle Studies	John Mayer	
2011	I Dreamed a Dream	Susan Boyle	
2011	My World 2.0	Justin Bieber	
2011	Teenage Dream	Katy Perry	
2012
2012	21	Adele	Not listed
2012	Born This Way	Lady Gaga	
2012	Doo-Wops & Hooligans	Bruno Mars	
2012	The Lady Killer	CeeLo Green	
2012	Loud	Rihanna	
2013
2013	Stronger	Kelly Clarkson	Not listed
2013	Ceremonials	Florence and the Machine	
2013	Overexposed	Maroon 5	
2013	Some Nights	Fun	
2013	The Truth About Love	Pink	
2014
2014	Unorthodox Jukebox	Bruno Mars	Ari Levine & Philip Lawrence producers; Manny Marroquin, engineer/mixer
2014	Blurred Lines	Robin Thicke	
2014	Paradise	Lana Del Rey	
2014	Pure Heroine	Lorde	
2014	The 20/20 Experience – The Complete Experience	Justin Timberlake	
2015
2015	In the Lonely Hour	Sam Smith	Jimmy Napes, Steve Fitzmaurice (producer); Steve Fitzmaurice (engineer/mixer)
2015	Bangerz	Miley Cyrus	
2015	Ghost Stories	Coldplay	
2015	My Everything	Ariana Grande	
2015	Prism	Katy Perry	
2015	x	Ed Sheeran	
2016
2016	1989	Taylor Swift	Max Martin & Shellback, producers; John Hanes, Serban Ghenea, Sam Holland, engineers/mixers
2016	Before This World	James Taylor	
2016	How Big, How Blue, How Beautiful	Florence and the Machine	
2016	Piece by Piece	Kelly Clarkson	
2016	Uptown Special	Mark Ronson	
2017
2017	25	Adele	Not listed
2017	Confident	Demi Lovato	
2017	Dangerous Woman	Ariana Grande	
2017	Purpose	Justin Bieber	
2017	This Is Acting	Sia	
2018
2018	÷	Ed Sheeran	Ed Sheeran, producer; Joe Rubel, Chris Sclafani & Mark "Spike" Stent, engineers/mixers
2018	Evolve	Imagine Dragons	
2018	Joanne	Lady Gaga	
2018	Kaleidoscope EP	Coldplay	
2018	Lust for Life	Lana Del Rey	
2018	Rainbow	Kesha	
2019
2019	Sweetener	Ariana Grande	Pharrell Williams, producer; Mike Larson, engineer
2019	Beautiful Trauma	Pink	
2019	Camila	Camila Cabello	
2019	Meaning of Life	Kelly Clarkson	
2019	Reputation	Taylor Swift	
2019	Shawn Mendes	Shawn Mendes	

=== 2020s ===
Year	Work	Artist	Winning production team
2020
2020	When We All Fall Asleep, Where Do We Go?	Billie Eilish	Finneas O'Connell, producer; Rob Kinelski & Finneas O'Connell, engineers/mixers
2020	The Lion King: The Gift	Beyoncé	
2020	Lover	Taylor Swift	
2020	No.6 Collaborations Project	Ed Sheeran	
2020	Thank U, Next	Ariana Grande	
2021
2021	Future Nostalgia	Dua Lipa	Koz, Lorna Blackwood, producers; Josh Gudwin, Cameron Gower Poole, Chris Gehringer, engineers/mixers
2021	Changes	Justin Bieber	
2021	Chromatica	Lady Gaga	
2021	Fine Line	Harry Styles	
2021	Folklore	Taylor Swift	
2022
2022	Sour	Olivia Rodrigo	Daniel Nigro & Alexander 23, producers; Chris Kasych, Mitch McCarthy, Ryan Linvill & Randy Merrill, engineers/mixers
2022	Happier Than Ever	Billie Eilish	
2022	Justice (Triple Chucks Deluxe)	Justin Bieber	
2022	Planet Her (Deluxe)	Doja Cat	
2022	Positions	Ariana Grande	
2023
2023	Harry's House	Harry Styles	Tyler Johnson, Tom Hull, Sammy Witte, producers; Mark Stent, Jeremy Hatcher, Oli Jacobs, Nick Lobel, Sammy Witte, Randy Merrill, engineers/mixers
2023	Music of the Spheres	Coldplay	
2023	Special	Lizzo	
2023	30	Adele	
2023	Voyage	ABBA	
2024
2024	Midnights	Taylor Swift	Jack Antonoff, producer; Serban Ghenea, Ken Lewis, Laura Sisk, Bryce Bordone, Mikey Freedom Hart, Sean Hutchinson, Evan Smith, Michael Riddleberger, Zem Audu, David Hart, Randy Merrill, engineers/mixers
2024	Chemistry	Kelly Clarkson	
2024	Endless Summer Vacation	Miley Cyrus	
2024	Guts	Olivia Rodrigo	
2024	−	Ed Sheeran	
2025
2025	Short n' Sweet	Sabrina Carpenter	Jack Antonoff, John Ryan, Ian Kirkpatrick, Julian Bunetta, producers; Jack Antonoff, Serban Ghenea, Manny Marroquin, Laura Sisk, Ian Kirkpatrick, Bryce Bordone, Oli Jacobs, Julian Bunetta, Jeff Gunnell, Jack Manning, John Ryan, Nathan Dantzler, Ruairi O'Flaherty, engineers/mixers
2025	Eternal Sunshine	Ariana Grande	
2025	Hit Me Hard and Soft	Billie Eilish	
2025	The Rise and Fall of a Midwest Princess	Chappell Roan	
2025	The Tortured Poets Department	Taylor Swift	
2026
2026	Mayhem	Lady Gaga	Cirkut, Andrew Watt, Gesaffelstein, producers; Serban Ghenea, Paul LaMalfa, Bryce Bordone, Randy Merrill, engineers/mixers
2026	I've Tried Everything but Therapy (Part 2)	Teddy Swims	
2026	Man's Best Friend	Sabrina Carpenter	
2026	Something Beautiful	Miley Cyrus	
2026	Swag	Justin Bieber	
2027	The Art of Loving	Olivia Dean	
2027	Petal	Ariana Grande	
2027	The Romantic	Bruno Mars	
2027	This Music May Contain Hope	Raye	
2027	You Seem Pretty Sad for a Girl So in Love	Olivia Rodrigo	

== Artists with multiple wins ==
2 wins

- Adele
- Kelly Clarkson
- Lady Gaga
- Taylor Swift

== Artists with multiple nominations ==
7 nominations

- Ariana Grande

6 nominations

- Kelly Clarkson
- Taylor Swift

5 nominations

- Justin Bieber
- Lady Gaga
- Justin Timberlake (including 2 with *NSYNC)

4 nominations

- Pink
- Ed Sheeran

3 nominations

- Adele
- Coldplay
- Miley Cyrus
- Billie Eilish
- Don Henley (including 2 with Eagles)
- Madonna
- Paul McCartney (including 1 with The Beatles)
- Sarah McLachlan
- James Taylor
- Bruno Mars
- Olivia Rodrigo

2 nominations

- Christina Aguilera
- Sabrina Carpenter
- Sheryl Crow
- Lana Del Rey
- Celine Dion
- Eagles
- Florence and the Machine
- George Harrison (including 1 with The Beatles)
- Norah Jones
- Annie Lennox
- Maroon 5
- John Mayer
- *NSYNC
- Katy Perry
- Britney Spears
- Gwen Stefani (including 1 with No Doubt)
- Sting
- Harry Styles

== See also ==
- Grammy Award for Best Contemporary Instrumental Album
