= Gravity (John Mayer song) =

Single by John Mayer

from the album Continuum
- Released: September 12, 2006
- Recorded: 2006
- Genre: Blues rock; soft rock; soul
- Length: 4:05
- Label: Sony BMG; Aware; Columbia
- Songwriter: John Mayer
- Producers: John Mayer; Steve Jordan

John Mayer singles chronology
"Belief" (2006)	"Gravity" (2006)	"Dreaming with a Broken Heart" (2007)

"Gravity" is a song by American musician John Mayer. It is written by Mayer and produced by Mayer and Steve Jordan. "Gravity" is featured on three of Mayer's releases: the 2005 live album Try! by the John Mayer Trio, his 2006 studio album Continuum, and his 2008 live album Where the Light Is: John Mayer Live in Los Angeles. In 2007, the song was released as the third single from Continuum.

== Background and production ==
Mayer suggested in an interview with the magazine Performing Songwriter that "Gravity" was the song he was always trying to write, using the example of "Come Back to Bed" (from Heavier Things) as being an early attempt at "writing Gravity". Along with "Vultures", the song is one of only two songs featured on the John Mayer Trio's debut album, Try!, that carried over into the release of Continuum. Alicia Keys provides background vocals at the end of the song.

== Personnel ==
- John Mayer - vocals, guitar
- Pino Palladino - bass
- Steve Jordan - drums
- Larry Goldings - keys, organ

== Song meaning ==
In a concert performed in December 2005, Mayer explained the significance and meaning of the song:

This is the most important song I’ve ever written, it's a time capsule song. I will listen to it every day of my life if I need to. It's honest to God the most important song I’ve ever written in my life, and it has the fewest words. I was in LA, and I was there for the summer, just writing tunes, and I was in the shower. And I don't know where it came from, but it's the damn truth you know, and I just sang, "gravity...is working against me"... This is a song about making sure you still love yourself, making sure you still have your head on, making sure you still say no the way your mom would say no. And I will need it every damn day of my life because it's easier to mess up than it is to stay here.

== Reception ==
Billboard called the single "an easygoing, bluesy number, convincingly conjuring the spirit of his idol Buddy Guy."

On February 22, 2007, "Gravity" entered Billboard's Hot 100 singles chart at #71; at that time, Mayer had two singles charting on the Hot 100 (the other song was "Waiting on the World to Change"). It also entered Billboard's Hot 100 Digital Songs Chart at #63

== Grammy Awards performance ==
At the 49th Annual Grammy Awards on February 11, 2007, Mayer performed "Gravity" with Corinne Bailey Rae and John Legend as the end of a medley. The set began with Rae's "Like a Star", and continued with Legend's "Coming Home", before concluding with "Gravity".

Stevie Wonder introduced the trio's performance, and each artist performed some aspect of every song through the entire medley. For Rae's "Like a Star", Mayer performed various backing guitar licks, while during Legend's "Coming Home" he performed little. For "Gravity", both Rae and Legend performed backing vocals and Legend played piano.

At the ceremony, Mayer won Best Male Pop Vocal Performance for the first single from Continuum, "Waiting on the World to Change".

At the 51st Annual Grammy Awards, the live version of "Gravity" that appears on Mayer's Where The Light Is: John Mayer Live In Los Angeles won the award for Best Solo Rock Vocal Performance.

== Cultural influence ==
The tune was #84 on Rolling Stone's list of the 100 Greatest Guitar Songs Of All Time. The family of astronaut Pilot Charles O. Hobaugh chose "Gravity" as the wake-up call for the astronauts aboard the Space Shuttle Endeavour on August 11, 2007. (The wake-up call is a tradition for NASA spaceflights since the days of Project Gemini.)

== Cover versions ==
- Overboard (Stranded, 2008)
- Main Squeeze (available by searching the internet for Fsqq495jiYw, 2021)
- Maya Delilah (2021)
- Amber Riley (Masked Singer, 2022)

== Charts ==
=== Weekly charts ===
Chart (2007)	Peak position
Netherlands (Single Top 100)	66
Spain (Promusicae)	39
US Billboard Hot 100	71
US Adult Alternative Airplay (Billboard)	18
US Adult Pop Airplay (Billboard)	10

=== Year-end charts ===
Chart (2007)	Position
US Adult Top 40 (Billboard)	31

== Certifications ==
Region	Certification	Certified units/sales
Australia (ARIA)	Platinum	70,000^{‡}
Denmark (IFPI Danmark)	Platinum	90,000^{‡}
New Zealand (RMNZ)	3× Platinum	90,000^{‡}
Spain (Promusicae)	Gold	30,000^{‡}
United States (RIAA)	2× Platinum	2,000,000^{‡}
^{‡} Sales+streaming figures based on certification alone.

== See also ==
- 2007 in music
