= Say (John Mayer song) =

2007 single by John Mayer

Single by John Mayer

from the album Continuum (2008 reissue)
- Released: November 20, 2007
- Studio: The Village (Los Angeles)
- Length: 3:49
- Label: Aware; Columbia
- Songwriter: John Mayer
- Producer: John Mayer

John Mayer singles chronology
"Dreaming with a Broken Heart" (2007)	"Say" (2007)	"Beat It" (2008)

Audio sample
- file; help

Music video
- "Say" on YouTube

"Say" is a song by John Mayer written for the Rob Reiner film The Bucket List in 2007. The ballad was released as a single on November 20, 2007, and was the first commercial single in Mayer's career that was not originally released on one of his albums but added to the special edition re-release of his album Continuum. The song earned Mayer his record-tying fourth and final Grammy Award for Best Male Pop Vocal Performance.

== Overview ==
The music video for "Say" was directed by music video director Vem. The song is also referred to as "Say (What You Need to Say)" as this is the main line from the chorus of the song. The song was also the first "assignment" song that Mayer had ever written. He notes that when writing the song "I don't know how much harder it gets than to see a beautiful, bittersweet movie and then have to write a song that matches the tone." Mayer posted the song on his official blog on November 16.

== Critical reception ==
Chuck Taylor of Billboard called "Say" a "lilting, bittersweet ballad" and said that it "is bound to be another staple for the [AC] format." In 2009, the song won a Grammy Award for Best Male Pop Vocal Performance at the 51st Grammy Awards. It was also nominated for Best Song Written for a Motion Picture, Television or Other Visual Media.

== Commercial and chart performance ==
In the US, "Say" peaked at number twelve in May 2008 on the Billboard Hot 100 chart and number eight on the Hot Digital Songs chart, surpassing his debut single, "No Such Thing", as his highest-peaking Hot 100 single. It was certified platinum by the RIAA, and has sold over 2 million copies in the US. It also peaked at number seventeen on the Pop 100 chart and number six on the Hot Adult Top 40 Tracks chart.

"Say" debuted on the Australian ARIA Singles Chart at number fifty-six, and climbed to its peak of number forty-seven the following week. On the Canadian Hot 100, it peaked at number twenty-seven.

== Personnel ==
- John Mayer – vocals, guitar
- Steve Jordan – drums
- Pino Palladino – bass
- Chad Franscoviak – engineer
- Peter Doris – Pro Tools engineer
- Justin Garrish, Brian Montgomery – assistant engineers
- Mark Shaiman – string arrangement
- Pete Karam – string engineer
- Tim Mitchell, Jared Bretcholtz – assistant string engineers
- Ted Jensen – mastering

== Charts ==
=== Weekly charts ===
Chart (2007–2008)	Peak position
Australia (ARIA)	47
Canada Hot 100 (Billboard)	27
Iceland (Tónlistinn)	10
US Billboard Hot 100	12
US Adult Alternative Airplay (Billboard)	17
US Adult Contemporary (Billboard)	3
US Adult Pop Airplay (Billboard)	6
US Pop Airplay (Billboard)	25

=== Year-end charts ===
Chart (2008)	Position
Canada (Canadian Hot 100)	88
Canada AC (Billboard)	10
US Billboard Hot 100	60
US Adult Contemporary (Billboard)	7
US Adult Top 40 (Billboard)	24

== Certifications ==
Region	Certification	Certified units/sales
Australia (ARIA)	Gold	35,000^{‡}
New Zealand (RMNZ)	Gold	15,000^{‡}
United States (RIAA)	3× Platinum	3,000,000^{‡}
^{‡} Sales+streaming figures based on certification alone.
