= Ménage à Twang =

American country music band

Menage a Twang
- Years active: 2005-
- Members: Jessica Del Vecchio, Emily Moore, Elizabeth Whitney
- Past members: Rachel Levy
- Website: http://www.menageatwang.com/Home.html

Ménage à Twang is an all-female music band from Brooklyn, New York who have been described as a humorous "lady country trio." The New York Daily News profiled the band in early 2010, interviewing the members and detailing their songs, which are about aspects of New York City life not usually covered.

The band was originally composed of singer / songwriter Emily Moore, a poet and English teacher at Stuyvesant High School, singer / songwriter / guitarist Jessica Del Vecchio, a feminist scholar and theater professor at James Madison University, and singer / songwriter / arranger / guitarist Rachel Levy, who works in TV and left the band in April 2012. Elizabeth Whitney joined the group in early 2013. One of the group members attended Yale and two of the three members attended Princeton. They have released two albums including their self-titled debut in 2008, which includes the song "Dan Smith Will Teach Me Guitar", and the album We Don't Judge in 2011. They have also released a video for the song "Listen Sister, Don't Date A Hipster," which also appears on their debut album.

== First album ==
They have a self-titled first album.

=== Track listing ===
- 1. Let's Share a Studio and Temp 3:52
- 2. Listen Sister, Don't Date a Hipster 2:54
- 3. The Key to Your Apartment 3:09
- 4. One Night Stand 2:35
- 5. Secret Conservative Side 3:10
- 6. I'll Only Support Your Art for So Long 2:31
- 7. Dan Smith Will Teach Me Guitar 3:11
- 8. Weekend Service Changes 3:25
- 9. Good Face / Bad Art 3:16
- 10. Back Burner Love 3:41
- 11. Survivor 3:40
- 12. When Your Day Job Becomes Your Career 4:07
- 13. Never Again 2:55
- 14. We are who we are 3:55
