= Waiting on the World to Change =

2006 single by John Mayer

- Standard artwork

Single by John Mayer

from the album Continuum
- Released: 2006
- Recorded: 2006
- Genre: Jazz fusion; pop rock; soft rock; blue-eyed soul; blues rock
- Length: 3:18
- Label: Aware; Columbia; Sony
- Songwriter: John Mayer
- Producers: Steve Jordan; John Mayer

John Mayer singles chronology
"Go!" (2005)	"Waiting on the World to Change" (2006)	"Belief" (2006)

Music video
- "Waiting on the World to Change" (official video) on YouTube

"Waiting on the World to Change" is a song by American singer-songwriter John Mayer. It was released as the lead single from his third studio album, Continuum (2006). The song enjoyed commercial success as a single and won the Grammy for Best Male Pop Vocal Performance at the 49th Grammy Awards. It was the most played song of the year in 2007 on mainstream adult contemporary radio in the US.

== Lyrics and structure ==
The song contains a highly popular chord progression often found in blues, rock, and soul songs. The chord progression is I - vi - IV - I - V - vi - IV - I, and in the case of "Waiting on the World to Change", it is in the key of D. However, contrary to most popular music, the second snare backbeat of the second measure of the two-bar beat that repeats through most of the song features an accent on the "and" of "4", and not directly on "4".

The song's theme centers on the singer and his generation's inaction in regard to current world conditions. However, he attributes this inaction to a lack of power:

Now we see everything that's going wrong
With the world and those who lead it
We just feel like we don't have the means
To rise above and beat it

He also laments the corruption among leaders:

It's not that we don't care,
We just know that the fight ain't fair

John Mayer confirmed this feeling of discontent between the leaders and that led to an interview with The Advocate, explaining the song this way: "It's saying, 'Well, I'll just watch American Idol because I know that if I were engaged in changing anything for the better, or the better as I see it, it would go unnoticed or be completely ineffective.' A lot of people have that feeling." Even so, the song alludes to hope for the future, with the singer intoning that with his generation's ascension to power, things will change:

One day our generation
Is gonna rule the population
So we keep on waiting
Waiting on the world to change

Politics was a topic that Mayer had not previously tackled. On his decision to include a politically tinged song, he commented, "You cannot avoid war in life, you cannot avoid the fear of terrorism, you cannot avoid those things now, they are a part of everyday demeanor. So in that sense it's become more of an acceptable thing to comment on because it's just so much of a white elephant."

== Music video ==
The music video for the song was directed by Philip Andelman and features Mayer walking along the East River while commissioned graffiti artists Futura, Tats Cru, and Daze spray paint messages relating to the song's content on New York City billboards. Liz Friedlander had initially been booked to direct the video.

== Promotion and release ==
A limited-edition EP of "Waiting on the World to Change" was released that includes both the album version and a bonus, acoustic version featuring Ben Harper. The EP also is the only official source for the studio (electric) version of "Good Love Is on the Way", a live version of which was previously released on the live album Try! by the John Mayer Trio. This particular EP has only been made available through Best Buy and with the purchase of the Continuum album. An acoustic studio version of "Good Love Is on the Way" is also available on Mayer's EP titled The Village Sessions, released on December 12, 2006 (The Village Sessions EP also contains the aforementioned Ben Harper acoustic version of "Waiting on the World to Change").

== Critical reception ==
"Waiting on the World to Change" received mixed reviews from music critics. Kelefa Sanneh of The New York Times called the song "a lovely and anger-free ode to a vaguely dissatisfied generation," while Matt Collar with AMG wrote that "Nobody — not a single one of Mayer's contemporaries — has come up with anything resembling a worthwhile anti-war anthem that is as good and speaks for their generation as much as his 'Waiting on the World to Change'". Rolling Stone called the opening track and first single "a moving apologia for Gen Y's seeming 'apathy'". Other reviewers commented on his progression as an artist; Tony Pascarella found the song "gives listeners, both old and new, an idea of how far Mayer has come. To be frank, this is no 'Your Body Is A Wonderland.' With Continuum, Mayer broadens his fan base by infusing a very blues and R&B-influenced sound."

Not all reviews were glowing: Entertainment Weekly and the Los Angeles Times were both less than impressed, with the Times saying that, in the song, "his mood tightens up unpleasantly". Greg Kot in the Chicago Tribune also referred to the song (in his report on Mayer's appearance at the Crossroads Guitar Festival) as "[perhaps] the most spineless social-justice song ever written. It advocates a passive approach, whereas the song it most closely resembles --- Curtis Mayfield's classic "People Get Ready" --- urges everyone to get involved, or risk being left behind". Pitchfork found in the track "the gravitas of an infomercial but only a fraction of the soul", giving it the least grade.

== Commercial performance ==
On February 22, 2007, it peaked at number 14 on the Billboard Hot 100 singles chart. It stayed on the charts for 41 weeks. The single also reached number 1 on Billboard's Hot Adult Contemporary Tracks chart, remaining on the chart for over a year. It is Mayer's most successful single (both in sales and chart positions). To date, in the US, the single has sold over two million digital downloads, becoming the 103rd song to top the two million mark in paid downloads. It is Mayer's first song to reach that plateau. It has been certified platinum by the RIAA, a distinction for downloads and sales in excess of one million. The song found success internationally as well. It peaked at number 17 on the Australian ARIA Digital Singles Chart and at number 36 on the New Zealand RIANZ Top 40 Singles Chart.

== Track listing ==
All tracks are written by John Mayer, except track 3, written by Mayer, Pino Palladino, and Steve Jordan. All tracks produced by Mayer and Jordan

Waiting on the World to Change: Limited Edition EP
No.	Title	Length
1.	"Waiting on the World to Change"	3:20
2.	"Waiting on the World to Change" (featuring Ben Harper)	2:51
3.	"Good Love Is on the Way"	3:35

== Personnel ==
Taken from liner notes.

- John Mayer – lead vocals, guitar, group vocals (track 1)
- Steve Jordan – drums (tracks 1, 3), percussion, group vocals (track 1)
- Pino Palladino – bass, group vocals (track 1)
- Roy Hargrove – horns (track 1)
- Ricky Peterson – keyboards (tracks 1, 2)
- Scotty Crowe, Kristen Moss, Lee Padgett, Sandy Vongdasy, Maggie Slavonic, Harley Pasternak, Ricky Cytonbaum, Jeannie Martinez – group vocals (track 1)
- Ben Harper – vocals (track 2)
- James Valentine – guitar (track 3)
- Chad Franscoviak – engineer
- Dave O'Donnell – engineer (track 1)
- Joe Ferla – engineer (track 3)
- Jim Monti, Dan Monti, Jared Nugent, Vanessa Parr – engineering assistance
- Manny Marroquin – mixing (tracks 1, 2)
- Michael Brauer – mixing (track 3)
- Jared Robbins – mix assistant (tracks 1, 2)
- Will Hensley – mix assistant (track 3)
- Greg Calbi – mastering
- Martin Pradler – digital editing, Pro Tools engineering
- Nathaniel Kunkel – Pro Tools engineering

== Charts ==
=== Weekly charts ===
Chart (2006–2007)	Peak position
Australia Digital Tracks (ARIA)	17
Canada Hot 100 (Billboard)	27
Netherlands (Single Top 100)	55
New Zealand (Recorded Music NZ)	36
UK Singles (OCC)	115
US Billboard Hot 100	14
US Adult Alternative Airplay (Billboard)	1
US Adult Contemporary (Billboard)	1
US Adult Pop Airplay (Billboard)	2
US Pop Airplay (Billboard)	15

=== Year-end charts ===
Chart (2006)	Position
US Billboard Hot 100	87
US Adult Top 40 (Billboard)	13

Chart (2007)	Position
US Billboard Hot 100	47
US Adult Contemporary (Billboard)	1
US Adult Top 40 (Billboard)	12

== Certifications ==
Region	Certification	Certified units/sales
Australia (ARIA)	3× Platinum	210,000^{‡}
Canada (Music Canada)	Platinum	40,000^{*}
Denmark (IFPI Danmark)	Platinum	90,000^{‡}
New Zealand (RMNZ)	3× Platinum	90,000^{‡}
United States (RIAA)	4× Platinum	4,000,000^{‡}
^{*} Sales figures based on certification alone.^{‡} Sales+streaming figures based on certification alone.

== Release history ==
Release dates and formats for "Waiting on the World to Change"
Region	Date	Format	Label(s)	Ref.
United States	September 26, 2006	Mainstream airplay	Columbia	

== See also ==
- Generation gap
- List of Billboard Adult Contemporary number ones of 2007
- List of anti-war songs
