= Grammy Award for Best Male Pop Vocal Performance =

Award

- Awarded for: quality male vocal performances in the pop music genre
- Country: United States
- Presented by: National Academy of Recording Arts and Sciences
- First award: 1959
- Final award: 2011
- Website: grammy.com

The Grammy Award for Best Male Pop Vocal Performance was a Grammy Award recognizing superior vocal performance by a male in the pop category, the first of which was presented in 1959. It was discontinued after the 2011 Grammy season. The award went to the artist. Singles or tracks only are eligible.

The awards have quite a convoluted history:

- From 1959 to 1960 there was an award called Best Vocal Performance, Male, which was for work in the pop field
- In 1961 the award was separated into Best Vocal Performance Single Record Or Track and Best Vocal Performance Album, Male
- From 1962 to 1963 the awards from the previous year were combined into Best Solo Vocal Performance, Male
- From 1964 to 1968 the award was called Best Vocal Performance, Male
- In 1969, the awards were combined and streamlined as the award for Best Contemporary-Pop Vocal Performance, Male
- From 1970 to 1971 the award was known as Best Contemporary Vocal Performance, Male
- From 1972 to 1994 the award was known as Best Pop Vocal Performance, Male
- From 1995 to 2011 it was known as Best Male Pop Vocal Performance

The award was discontinued in 2012 in a major overhaul of Grammy categories. From 2012, all solo performances in the pop category (male, female, and instrumental) were shifted to the newly formed Best Pop Solo Performance category.

Sting, Stevie Wonder, and John Mayer, with four wins each, are the artists with the most awards in the category. Elton John is the artist with the most nominations at twelve.

Years reflect the year in which the Grammy Awards were presented, for works released in the previous year.

== Recipients ==
=== 1950s ===
Year	Artist	Work
1959	Perry Como	"Catch a Falling Star"
1959	Domenico Modugno	"Nel blu dipinto di blu"
1959	Frank Sinatra	Come Fly With Me
1959	Frank Sinatra	"Witchcraft"
1959	Andy Williams	"The Hawaiian Wedding Song"

=== 1960s ===
Year	Artist	Work
1960	Frank Sinatra	Come Dance with Me!
1960	Harry Belafonte	Belafonte at Carnegie Hall
1960	Jesse Belvin	Guess Who
1960	Bobby Darin	"Mack the Knife"
1960	Robert Merrill	An Evening with Lerner and Loewe
1961	Best Vocal Performance Single Record or Track, Male	
1961	Ray Charles	"Georgia on My Mind"
1961	Johnny Mathis	"Misty"
1961	Elvis Presley	"Are You Lonesome Tonight?"
1961	Jim Reeves	"He'll Have to Go"
1961	Frank Sinatra	"Nice 'n' Easy"
1961	Best Vocal Performance Album, Male	
1961	Ray Charles	The Genius of Ray Charles
1961	Harry Belafonte	Belafonte Returns to Carnegie Hall
1961	Nat King Cole	Wild Is Love
1961	Elvis Presley	G.I. Blues
1961	Frank Sinatra	Nice 'n' Easy
1962	Jack Jones	"Lollipops and Roses"
1962	Jimmy Dean	"Big Bad John"
1962	Burl Ives	"A Little Bitty Tear"
1962	Steve Lawrence	Portrait of My Love
1962	Andy Williams	Danny Boy
1963	Tony Bennett	"I Left My Heart in San Francisco"
1963	Ray Charles	"I Can't Stop Loving You"
1963	Sammy Davis, Jr.	What Kind of Fool Am I and Other Show-Stoppers
1963	Anthony Newley	"What Kind of Fool Am I?"
1963	Mel Torme	Comin' Home Baby!
1964	Jack Jones	"Wives and Lovers"
1964	Tony Bennett	"I Wanna Be Around"
1964	Ray Charles	"Busted"
1964	John Gary	Catch a Rising Star
1964	Andy Williams	"Days of Wine and Roses"
1965	Louis Armstrong	"Hello, Dolly!"
1965	Tony Bennett	"Who Can I Turn To?"
1965	João Gilberto	Getz/Gilberto
1965	Dean Martin	Everybody Loves Somebody
1965	Andy Williams	Call Me Irresponsible
1966	Frank Sinatra	"It Was a Very Good Year"
1966	Tony Bennett	"The Shadow of Your Smile"
1966	Paul McCartney	"Yesterday"
1966	Roger Miller	"King of the Road"
1966	Glenn Yarbrough	Baby the Rain Must Fall
1967	Frank Sinatra	"Strangers in the Night"
1967	David Houston	"Almost Persuaded"
1967	Jack Jones	"The Impossible Dream"
1967	Paul McCartney	"Eleanor Rigby"
1967	Jim Reeves	"Distant Drums"
1967	Andy Williams	The Shadow of Your Smile
1968	Glen Campbell	"By the Time I Get to Phoenix"
1968	Ed Ames	My Cup Runneth Over
1968	Ray Charles	"Yesterday"
1968	Frank Sinatra	Francis Albert Sinatra & Antonio Carlos Jobim
1968	Frankie Valli	"Can't Take My Eyes Off You"
1969	José Feliciano	"Light My Fire"
1969	Glen Campbell	"Wichita Lineman"
1969	Bobby Goldsboro	"Honey"
1969	Richard Harris	"MacArthur Park"
1969	O.C. Smith	"Little Green Apples"

=== 1970s ===
Year	Artist	Work
1970	Harry Nilsson	"Everybody's Talkin'"
1970	Frank Sinatra	"My Way"
1970	Joe South	"Games People Play"
1970	Ray Stevens	"Gitarzan"
1970	B. J. Thomas	"Raindrops Keep Fallin' on My Head"
1971	Ray Stevens	"Everything Is Beautiful"
1971	Brook Benton	"Rainy Night in Georgia"
1971	Joe Cocker	Mad Dogs & Englishmen
1971	Elton John	Elton John
1971	James Taylor	Sweet Baby James
1972	James Taylor	"You've Got a Friend"
1972	Perry Como	"It's Impossible"
1972	Neil Diamond	"I Am... I Said"
1972	Gordon Lightfoot	"If You Could Read My Mind"
1972	Bill Withers	"Ain't No Sunshine"
1973	Harry Nilsson	"Without You"
1973	Mac Davis	Baby, Don't Get Hooked on Me
1973	Sammy Davis, Jr.	"The Candy Man"
1973	Don McLean	"American Pie"
1973	Gilbert O'Sullivan	"Alone Again (Naturally)"
1974	Stevie Wonder	"You Are the Sunshine of My Life"
1974	Perry Como	"And I Love You So"
1974	Jim Croce	"Bad, Bad Leroy Brown"
1974	Elton John	"Daniel"
1974	Paul Simon	There Goes Rhymin' Simon
1975	Stevie Wonder	Fulfillingness' First Finale
1975	Harry Chapin	"Cat's in the Cradle"
1975	Elton John	"Don't Let the Sun Go Down on Me"
1975	Dave Loggins	"Please Come to Boston"
1975	Billy Preston	"Nothing from Nothing"
1976	Paul Simon	Still Crazy After All These Years
1976	Morris Albert	"Feelings"
1976	Glen Campbell	"Rhinestone Cowboy"
1976	Elton John	Captain Fantastic and the Brown Dirt Cowboy
1976	Neil Sedaka	"Bad Blood"
1977	Stevie Wonder	Songs in the Key of Life
1977	George Benson	"This Masquerade"
1977	Gordon Lightfoot	"The Wreck of the Edmund Fitzgerald"
1977	Lou Rawls	"You'll Never Find Another Love Like Mine"
1977	Boz Scaggs	Silk Degrees
1978	James Taylor	"Handy Man"
1978	Stephen Bishop	"On and On"
1978	Andy Gibb	"I Just Want to Be Your Everything"
1978	Engelbert Humperdinck	After the Lovin'
1978	Leo Sayer	"When I Need You"
1979	Barry Manilow	"Copacabana (At the Copa)"
1979	Jackson Browne	Running on Empty
1979	Dan Hill	"Sometimes When We Touch"
1979	Gerry Rafferty	"Baker Street"
1979	Gino Vannelli	"I Just Wanna Stop"

=== 1980s ===
Year	Artist	Work
1980	Billy Joel	52nd Street
1980	Robert John	"Sad Eyes"
1980	Kenny Rogers	"She Believes in Me"
1980	Rod Stewart	"Da Ya Think I'm Sexy?"
1980	James Taylor	"Up on the Roof"
1981	Kenny Loggins	"This Is It"
1981	Christopher Cross	Christopher Cross
1981	Kenny Rogers	"Lady"
1981	Paul Simon	"Late in the Evening"
1981	Frank Sinatra	"Theme from New York, New York"
1982	Al Jarreau	Breakin' Away
1982	Christopher Cross	"Arthur's Theme (Best That You Can Do)"
1982	James Ingram	"Just Once"
1982	John Lennon	Double Fantasy
1982	Bill Withers	"Just the Two of Us"
1983	Lionel Richie	"Truly"
1983	Donald Fagen	"I.G.Y. (What a Beautiful World)"
1983	Joe Jackson	"Steppin' Out"
1983	Elton John	"Blue Eyes"
1983	Michael McDonald	"I Keep Forgettin' (Every Time You're Near)"
1983	Rick Springfield	"Don't Talk to Strangers"
1984	Michael Jackson	Thriller
1984	Billy Joel	"Uptown Girl"
1984	Prince	1999
1984	Lionel Richie	"All Night Long"
1984	Michael Sembello	"Maniac"
1985	Phil Collins	"Against All Odds (Take a Look at Me Now)"
1985	Kenny Loggins	"Footloose"
1985	Lionel Richie	"Hello"
1985	John Waite	"Missing You"
1985	Stevie Wonder	"I Just Called to Say I Love You"
1986	Phil Collins	No Jacket Required
1986	Glenn Frey	"The Heat Is On"
1986	Sting	The Dream of the Blue Turtles
1986	Stevie Wonder	"Part-Time Lover"
1986	Paul Young	"Every Time You Go Away"
1987	Steve Winwood	"Higher Love"
1987	Peter Cetera	"Glory of Love"
1987	Kenny Loggins	"Danger Zone"
1987	Michael McDonald	"Sweet Freedom"
1987	Paul Simon	Graceland
1988	Sting	Bring on the Night
1988	Michael Jackson	Bad
1988	Al Jarreau	"Moonlighting (Theme)"
1988	Elton John	"Candle in the Wind" (Live)
1988	Bruce Springsteen	"Brilliant Disguise"
1989	Bobby McFerrin	"Don't Worry, Be Happy"
1989	Phil Collins	"A Groovy Kind of Love"
1989	George Michael	"Father Figure"
1989	Sting	"Be Still My Beating Heart"
1989	Steve Winwood	"Roll with It"

=== 1990s ===
Year	Artist	Work
1990	Michael Bolton	"How Am I Supposed to Live Without You"
1990	Billy Joel	"We Didn't Start the Fire"
1990	Richard Marx	"Right Here Waiting"
1990	Roy Orbison	"You Got It"
1990	Prince	Batman
1991	Roy Orbison	"Oh, Pretty Woman"
1991	Phil Collins	"Another Day in Paradise"
1991	Michael Bolton	"Georgia on My Mind"
1991	James Ingram	"I Don't Have the Heart"
1991	Billy Joel	Storm Front
1991	Rod Stewart	"Downtown Train"
1992	Michael Bolton	"When a Man Loves a Woman"
1992	Bryan Adams	"(Everything I Do) I Do It for You"
1992	Marc Cohn	"Walking in Memphis"
1992	George Michael	"Freedom! '90"
1992	Aaron Neville	Warm Your Heart
1992	Seal	"Crazy"
1993	Eric Clapton	"Tears in Heaven"
1993	Peter Gabriel	Us
1993	Michael Jackson	"Black or White"
1993	Elton John	"The One"
1993	Lyle Lovett	Joshua Judges Ruth
1994	Sting	"If I Ever Lose My Faith in You"
1994	Boy George	"The Crying Game"
1994	Billy Joel	"The River of Dreams"
1994	Aaron Neville	"Don't Take Away My Heaven"
1994	Rod Stewart	"Have I Told You Lately"
1995	Elton John	"Can You Feel the Love Tonight"
1995	Michael Bolton	"Said I Loved You...But I Lied"
1995	Prince	"The Most Beautiful Girl in the World"
1995	Seal	"Prayer for the Dying"
1995	Luther Vandross	"Love the One You're With"
1996	Seal	"Kiss from a Rose"
1996	Bryan Adams	"Have You Ever Really Loved a Woman?"
1996	Michael Jackson	"You Are Not Alone"
1996	Elton John	"Believe"
1996	Sting	"When We Dance"
1997	Eric Clapton	"Change the World"
1997	Bryan Adams	"Let's Make a Night to Remember"
1997	John Mellencamp	"Key West Intermezzo (I Saw You First)"
1997	Tony Rich Project	"Nobody Knows"
1997	Sting	"Let Your Soul Be Your Pilot"
1998	Elton John	"Candle in the Wind 1997"
1998	Babyface	"Every Time I Close My Eyes"
1998	Maxwell	"Whenever Wherever Whatever"
1998	Seal	"Fly Like an Eagle"
1998	Duncan Sheik	"Barely Breathing"
1999	Eric Clapton	"My Father's Eyes"
1999	Eagle-Eye Cherry	"Save Tonight"
1999	Brian McKnight	"Anytime"
1999	Shawn Mullins	"Lullaby"
1999	Sting	"You Were Meant for Me"

=== 2000s ===
Year	Artist	Work
2000	Sting	"Brand New Day"
2000	Marc Anthony	"I Need to Know"
2000	Lou Bega	"Mambo No. 5"
2000	Andrea Bocelli	"Sogno"
2000	Ricky Martin	"Livin' la Vida Loca"
2001	Sting	"She Walks This Earth"
2001	Marc Anthony	"You Sang to Me"
2001	Don Henley	"Taking You Home"
2001	Ricky Martin	"She Bangs"
2001	Brian McKnight	"6, 8, 12"
2002	James Taylor	"Don't Let Me Be Lonely Tonight"
2002	Craig David	"Fill Me In"
2002	Michael Jackson	"You Rock My World"
2002	Elton John	"I Want Love"
2002	Brian McKnight	"Still"
2003	John Mayer	"Your Body Is a Wonderland"
2003	Craig David	"7 Days"
2003	Elton John	"Original Sin"
2003	Sting	"Fragile" (Live)
2003	James Taylor	"October Road"
2004	Justin Timberlake	"Cry Me a River"
2004	George Harrison	"Any Road"
2004	Michael McDonald	"Ain't No Mountain High Enough"
2004	Sting	"Send Your Love"
2004	Warren Zevon	"Keep Me in Your Heart"
2005	John Mayer	"Daughters"
2005	Elvis Costello	"Let's Misbehave"
2005	Josh Groban	"You Raise Me Up"
2005	Prince	"Cinnamon Girl"
2005	Seal	"Love's Divine"
2006	Stevie Wonder	"From the Bottom of My Heart"
2006	Jack Johnson	"Sitting, Waiting, Wishing"
2006	Paul McCartney	"Fine Line"
2006	Seal	"Walk on By"
2006	Rob Thomas	"Lonely No More"
2007	John Mayer	"Waiting on the World to Change"
2007	James Blunt	"You're Beautiful"
2007	John Legend	"Save Room"
2007	Paul McCartney	"Jenny Wren"
2007	Daniel Powter	"Bad Day"
2008	Justin Timberlake	"What Goes Around... Comes Around"
2008	Michael Bublé	"Everything"
2008	John Mayer	"Belief"
2008	Paul McCartney	"Dance Tonight"
2008	Seal	"Amazing"
2009	John Mayer	"Say"
2009	Kid Rock	"All Summer Long"
2009	Paul McCartney	"That Was Me"
2009	Jason Mraz	"I'm Yours"
2009	Ne-Yo	"Closer"
2009	James Taylor	"Wichita Lineman"

=== 2010s ===
Year	Artist	Work
2010	Jason Mraz	"Make It Mine"
2010	John Legend	"This Time"
2010	Maxwell	"Love You"
2010	Seal	"If You Don't Know Me by Now"
2010	Stevie Wonder	"All About the Love Again"
2011	Bruno Mars	"Just the Way You Are"
2011	Michael Bublé	"Haven't Met You Yet"
2011	Michael Jackson	"This Is It"
2011	Adam Lambert	"Whataya Want from Me"
2011	John Mayer	"Half of My Heart"

== Multiple wins ==
4 wins

- John Mayer
- Sting
- Stevie Wonder

3 wins

- Eric Clapton
- Frank Sinatra
- James Taylor

2 wins

- Michael Bolton
- Ray Charles
- Phil Collins
- Elton John
- Jack Jones
- Justin Timberlake
- Harry Nilsson

== Multiple nominations ==
12 nominations

- Elton John

11 nominations

- Sting

10 nominations

- Frank Sinatra

8 nominations

- Seal

7 nominations

- James Taylor
- Stevie Wonder

6 nominations

- Michael Jackson
- John Mayer
- Paul McCartney
- Stevie Wonder

5 nominations

- Ray Charles
- Billy Joel
- Andy Williams

4 nominations

- Tony Bennett
- Michael Bolton
- Phil Collins
- Prince
- Paul Simon

3 nominations

- Bryan Adams
- Glen Campbell
- Eric Clapton
- Perry Como
- Jack Jones
- Kenny Loggins
- Michael McDonald
- Brian McKnight
- Lionel Richie
- Rod Stewart

2 nominations

- Marc Anthony
- Harry Belafonte
- Michael Bublé
- Christopher Cross
- Craig David
- Sammy Davis Jr.
- James Ingram
- Al Jarreau
- John Legend
- Gordon Lightfoot
- Ricky Martin
- Maxwell
- George Michael
- Jason Mraz
- Aaron Neville
- Harry Nilsson
- Roy Orbison
- Elvis Presley
- Jim Reeves
- Kenny Rogers
- Ray Stevens
- Justin Timberlake
- Steve Winwood
- Bill Withers

== Contemporary (R&R) Performance ==
In 1966 the Recording Academy established a similar, but different, category in the Pop Field for Best Contemporary (rock & roll) Performances. The category went through a number of changes before being discontinued after the 1968 awards.

- In 1966 the award was called Best Contemporary (R&R) Vocal Performance - Male
- In 1967 the award from the previous year was combined with the equivalent award for women as the Grammy Award for Best Contemporary (R&R) Solo Vocal Performance - Male or Female
- In 1968 the previous award was once again separated by gender, with the male award called Best Contemporary Male Solo Vocal Performance

== See also ==
- Grammy Award for Best Pop Solo Performance
- Grammy Award for Best Female Pop Vocal Performance
