= Continuum (John Mayer album) =

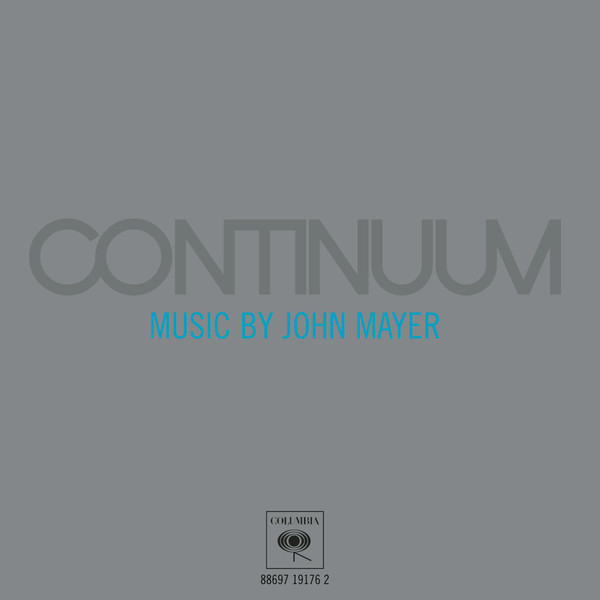
- Artwork for United States and some non-American editions

Studio album by John Mayer
- Released: September 12, 2006
- Recorded: January 16, 2005–July 2006
- Studios: Village Recorder, Los Angeles, California; Royal, Memphis, Tennessee; Avatar, New York City, New York; Right Track, New York City, New York
- Genres: Pop rock; blues rock; blue-eyed soul; soft rock
- Length: 49:34
- Labels: Aware; Columbia
- Producers: John Mayer; Steve Jordan

John Mayer chronology
| Heavier Things (2003) | Continuum (2006) | Battle Studies (2009) |

Singles from Continuum
- 1. "Waiting on the World to Change" Released: July 11, 2006; 2. "Belief" Released: September 2006; 3. "Gravity" Released: September 12, 2006; 4. "Dreaming with a Broken Heart" Released: July 4, 2007; 5. "Say" Released: November 20, 2007

Alternative cover
- Artwork for most non-American editions

Continuum is the third studio album by American singer-songwriter John Mayer, released on September 12, 2006, by Aware and Columbia Records. Recording sessions took place from January 2005 to July 2006 at The Village Recorder in Los Angeles, Avatar Studios and Right Track/Sound on Sound in New York City, and Royal Studios in Memphis, Tennessee. Produced by singer and drummer Steve Jordan, it marked a change in Mayer's musical style, incorporating elements of blues and soul more heavily than in his previous work with pop rock. Bassist Pino Palladino also performs on the album; Mayer, Jordan, and Palladino had toured the previous year under the name John Mayer Trio and had released a live album, Try!. Studio versions of two of the songs from that album appear on Continuum.

The album debuted at number 2 on the US Billboard 200, selling more than 300,186 copies in its first week of sales. It also reached the top-10 of several other countries and sold over 5 million copies worldwide. Upon its release, Continuum received generally positive reviews from critics, and earned Mayer several accolades, including a Grammy Award for Best Pop Vocal Album and Best Male Pop Vocal Performance at the 49th Grammy Awards. Rolling Stone named it the 11th best album of 2006; in 2020, they ranked it number 486 on its 2020 updated list of the 500 Greatest Albums of All Time.

== Background ==
Mayer made the decision to name his third album Continuum at least a year before the album was released. In his column in the April 2005 issue of Esquire, Mayer wrote, "I'm obsessed with time lately, constantly crunching the numbers to get some sense of where I stand in the continuum." In his column in the September 2005 issue of Esquire he confirmed the title, writing, "I've never experienced anything like the recording process involved in making Continuum, my third-album-to-be."

The album features mainly new songs, though "Gravity" and "Vultures" are available in live versions from John Mayer Trio's Try!, and "Bold as Love" is a Jimi Hendrix cover: the first Hendrix cover that Mayer has ever recorded as a studio release, although Mayer had played "Bold as Love" live many times prior to the release of Continuum such as on the televised Tsunami Aid: A Concert of Hope on January 15, 2005, and has since recorded other Hendrix songs such as "The Wind Cries Mary" and "Wait Until Tomorrow" in live settings. The album contains a collaboration between Mayer and 8-string guitarist Charlie Hunter on "In Repair". The song "Stop This Train" was written during a time of, what Mayer calls, "solitary refinement"; he was in bed suffering from double kidney stones and living in a hotel while finding a new residence.

== Cover art ==
The word "Continuum" is showcased across the center. The typography for the title was customized to give the letters "C" and "o" the appearance of an infinity symbol: ∞. Many of the following letters touch in some way; the right vertical line of the second "u" is the left vertical line of the "m" in the title.

The album has been released several times with slight differences in the artwork. The three major releases feature, respectively: A photo of Mayer; a silver cover with a white title; and a Local 83-only version (including a silver bag). The first features a dark gray-scale photograph of Mayer with the title near the top; another is identical except for "featured" centered across the top. Some versions feature only a CD. In these cases, the album features Mayer on the cover. When the album is packaged with a jewel casing, the inside cover is all white with the "Continuum" logo printed very faintly on it. The basic CD is white with off-white letters that slides into a slipcase of deep gray with lettering in light gray and blue/green. During the pre-order, it appeared as though there would be a variation of said artwork on a special edition version, and it turned out that the "special packaging" was a shiny silver bag which held the CD and the pre-order bonuses. All artwork was designed by Mayer along with Smog Design, Inc. The inside of the CD sleeve includes photographs, some taken by Mayer, such as of the studio (where Mayer's handwriting describes, "*this is what my heart looks like*") and a Ferris wheel where Mayer's handwriting is imposed over the top of the photograph, featuring the lyrics to his songs. There is also a photograph of Mayer with Pino Palladino and Steve Jordan (the John Mayer Trio) on a beach. The CD sleeve features the lyrics to all of Continuum's songs. With both Heavier Things and Room for Squares, there were incongruities with the lyrics in the sleeves when compared with the albums; however, the Continuum lyrics are all printed exactly as recorded on the album.

The UK version of Continuum features a photograph of Mayer on the cover. This cover was used for promotional releases, such as when Mayer performed live on the Australian television program Rove Live. The alternative cover was presented for television by the show's host Rove McManus.

In November 2007, a special edition of Continuum was released. The cover for the special edition features a grey background and silver text for the title, with the Columbia Records logo in black instead of white. However, the line "Music by John Mayer" remains the same teal color as on the regular release. The cover layout is the same.

== Release and promotion ==
By the time of release, Mayer had performed almost all of the songs live at least once, either with a full band or alone in an acoustic set during the Hotel Cafe shows from the previous winter. On August 23, 2006, the entire Continuum album was played on Los Angeles radio station STAR 98.7, with the segment hosted by Mayer himself. He repeated the event for different media outlets several more times before the album's September release, such as "Sneak Peek" through Clear Channel Music; he also performed three songs live for Sessions@AOL. Subsequently, the album was made available for streaming on Clear Channel Music website and for pre-purchase on iTunes, all prior to the album's official release. The iTunes pre-release included the exclusive bonus track, "Can't Take That Plane".

A limited edition EP of "Waiting on the World to Change" was released, featuring the album version of the song. The EP includes a bonus acoustic version which features Ben Harper, as well as a studio recording of "Good Love is on the Way", a live version of which was released on the John Mayer Trio's Try!. The Ben Harper version of "Waiting on the World to Change" and an alternative acoustic-only version of "Good Love is on the Way" are also available on Mayer's subsequent release, the EP The Village Sessions.

The first single, "Waiting on the World to Change", was released on July 11, 2006. The music video for the song was directed by Philip Andelman and features Mayer walking along the East River while graffiti artists Futura, Tats Cru, and Daze graffiti messages on New York City billboards displaying messages relating to the song's content. On February 22, 2007, Continuum's second single, "Gravity", entered the Billboard Hot 100 at number 71, joining the already charting "Waiting on the World to Change", making for two Continuum singles on the Hot 100 at the same time. It was featured in the soundtrack for the television series House in 2008. "Waiting" entered the Billboard's Hot 100 Digital Songs Chart at number 63. It has sold 68,115 in digital downloads since its release. Mayer performed the single "Gravity" at the 49th Annual Grammy Awards with fellow musicians Corinne Bailey Rae and John Legend. "Dreaming with a Broken Heart" is the third official single release from Continuum, and was released for ads at Hot AC and Triple A radio on July 9, 2007.

On November 20, 2007, a special edition of Continuum was released that included a bonus disc of six live tracks and a 20-page booklet containing photos from the tour. Five of the songs are live versions of tracks from Continuum, including all of its singles. A sixth song, "I Don't Need No Doctor", was originally performed by Ray Charles; Mayer previously performed the song as part of his set with the John Mayer Trio. The single "Say" (from The Bucket List soundtrack) was also made available on the CD through an online download unlock function. The tracks were produced by Mayer's engineer Chad Franscoviak.

The album was reissued on Columbia Records on April 8, 2008, with the single "Say" being added directly on the disc. A vinyl LP version of this reissue was also released, on two 180-gram discs.

== Commercial performance ==
Continuum debuted on the US Billboard 200 chart at number 2, with 300,186 copies sold. It did not reach number one, impeded by the Justin Timberlake album FutureSex/LoveSounds, which was released at the same time. As of August 2018, Continuum has sold four million copies in the United States and is Mayer's third consecutive multi-platinum selling studio album. It stayed in the top 100 of the Billboard 200 for 50 weeks (37 of those weeks were in the top 50).

Worldwide, it has moved more than 5 million copies. In Canada, the album debuted at number 2 on the official Albums Chart and is certified platinum for sales of 100,000 copies. According to Nielsen SoundScan, Continuum was the fourth best selling digital album for 2006 in Canada. With no lead single in Australia, Continuum debuted on the ARIA Albums Chart at number 12, his lowest debut in Australia to date (Room for Squares debuted at number 5 and Heavier Things at number 4). Continuum was the ninety-eighth best selling album for 2006 on the ARIA (ARIA) Albums Chart. It has been certified gold by ARIA for sales of 35,000 copies and had stayed on ARIA's Top 100 Albums chart for 34 weeks before exiting the chart. Continuum held the record for the most album downloads in history with over 326,000 copies downloaded until June 29, 2008, when it was surpassed by the Coldplay album Viva la Vida or Death and All His Friends.

On February 22, 2007, the lead single, "Waiting on the World to Change", peaked at number 14 on the Billboard Hot 100 Singles Chart, where it stayed for 41 weeks. To date in the US, the single has sold 1,632,137 in digital downloads, and was certified platinum by the RIAA when it crossed the one-million mark in sales. After a month of release, the single peaked at number 17 on the Australian ARIA Top 40 Digital Track Chart on November 19, 2006.

The album was nominated for three Grammys (including Album of the Year), and won two (Best Pop Vocal Album and Best Male Pop Vocal Performance for "Waiting on the World to Change".

== Critical reception ==
Professional ratings
Aggregate scores
| Source | Rating |
|---|---|
| Metacritic | 67/100 |
Review scores
| Source | Rating |
| AllMusic | 4.5/5 stars |
| Blender | 3.5/5 stars |
| Entertainment Weekly | B− |
| Los Angeles Times | 2.5/4 stars |
| Mojo | 4/5 stars |
| MusicOMH | 4/5 stars |
| Now | 4/5 |
| Q | 2/5 stars |
| Rolling Stone | 4/5 stars |
| Uncut | 2/5 stars |

Continuum received generally positive reviews from music critics. At Metacritic, which assigns a normalized rating out of 100 to reviews from mainstream critics, the album received an average score of 67, based on 18 reviews. Matt Collar of AllMusic called it "a gorgeously produced, brilliantly stripped-to-basics album that incorporates blues, soft-funk, R&B, folk and pop in a sound that is totally owned by Mayer." Mojo called it a "great blue-eyed soul record." Ann Powers of the Los Angeles Times commented that Mayer is "best when treading softly, finding the fluid heart of blue-eyed soul", rather than on more "angst"-filled songs. Bryan Borzykowski of Now felt that "[Mayer's] melodic voice, warm production, complex riffs and thoughtful lyrics should cure the violent reactions Mayer's name used to evoke." MSN Music's Robert Christgau gave Continuum a three-star honorable mention, indicating "an enjoyable effort consumers attuned to its overriding aesthetic or individual vision may well treasure". He cited "Waiting on the World to Change" and "The Heart of Life" as highlights and quipped, "Saying in so many words what his less-gifted, more-pretentious contemporaries think it's cool to camouflage". Anthony DeCurtis, writing in Rolling Stone, called it "a smart, breezy album that deftly fuses his love for old-school blues and R&B with his natural gift for sharp melodies and well-constructed songs." The magazine later ranked it the eleventh best album of 2006.

In a mixed review, Slant Magazine's Jonathan Keefe wrote that, "with no edge to the songwriting and with such spit-polished, tasteful production, Continuum just doesn't convince as a heady, soulful rock album or as Mayer's creative quantum leap forward". Jody Rosen, writing for Entertainment Weekly, felt that Mayer is too "classy" and wrote that, although the songs are "shapely" and "the musicianship is elegant and virtuosic", the music's "low-key loveliness dissipates into a sleep-inducing soft-rock haze." Stylus Magazine stated that Mayer "calmly circles the same career themes with the same warmed-over, palatable guitar weavings". Q magazine called it "dour stuff reminiscent of a yogic Sting."

== Track listing ==
All songs written by John Mayer, except where noted.

| No. | Title | Writer(s) | Length |
|---|---|---|---|
| 1. | "Waiting on the World to Change" | | 3:21 |
| 2. | "I Don't Trust Myself (With Loving You)" | | 4:52 |
| 3. | "Belief" | | 4:02 |
| 4. | "Gravity" | | 4:05 |
| 5. | "The Heart of Life" | | 3:19 |
| 6. | "Vultures" | Mayer, Steve Jordan, Pino Palladino | 4:11 |
| 7. | "Stop This Train" | | 4:45 |
| 8. | "Slow Dancing in a Burning Room" | | 4:02 |
| 9. | "Bold as Love" (The Jimi Hendrix Experience cover) | Jimi Hendrix | 4:18 |
| 10. | "Dreaming with a Broken Heart" | | 4:07 |
| 11. | "In Repair" | Mayer, Charlie Hunter | 6:09 |
| 12. | "I'm Gonna Find Another You" | | 2:43 |
| Total length: | | | 49:54 |

2008 reissue
| No. | Title | Length |
|---|---|---|
| 13. | "Say" | 3:49 |
| Total length: | | 53:51 |

2007 edition bonus disc
| No. | Title | Writer(s) | Live details | Length |
|---|---|---|---|---|
| 1. | "Vultures" | Mayer, Jordan, Palladino | Charter One Pavilion, Chicago, Illinois, June 28, 2007 | 5:40 |
| 2. | "Belief" | | U.S. Bank Arena, Cincinnati, Ohio, June 26, 2007 | 6:04 |
| 3. | "Waiting on the World to Change" | | Verizon Center, Washington, D.C., July 25, 2007 | 3:39 |
| 4. | "Dreaming with a Broken Heart" | | Hollywood Bowl, Los Angeles, June 10, 2007 | 4:15 |
| 5. | "I Don't Need No Doctor" (Ray Charles cover) | Jo Armstead, Nickolas Ashford, Valerie Simpson | Wells Fargo Arena, Des Moines, Iowa, June 18, 2007 | 5:54 |
| 6. | "Gravity" | | New England Dodge Music Center, Hartford, Connecticut, July 14, 2007 | 10:20 |
| Total length: | | | | 36:43 |

== Personnel ==
=== Musicians ===
- John Mayer – vocals, guitars (all tracks); production
- Pino Palladino – bass guitar (all tracks); backing vocals on track 1
- Steve Jordan – drums on all tracks except 5; percussion on tracks 1, 2, 5, 8, and 10; backing vocals on track 1; production
- Ricky Peterson – keyboards on tracks 1, 6, 11 and 12; backing vocals on track 1
- Roy Hargrove – horns on tracks 1 and 2
- Willie Weeks – bass on track 2
- Ben Harper – guitar on track 3
- Clayton Cameron – drums on track 3
- Manolo Badrena – percussion on track 3
- Larry Goldings – keyboards and organ on track 4
- James Valentine – guitar on tracks 7 and 11
- Jamie Muhoberac – keyboards on tracks 7 and 11
- Charlie Hunter – eight-string guitar on track 11
- Jim LeBlanc-Barnes – shaker on tracks 4 and 11; backing vocals on track 9

- Lester Snell – keyboards and horn arrangements assistance on track 12
- Boo Mitchell – horn arrangements on track 12
- Willie Mitchell – horn arrangements on track 12
- Carlos Saucedo – guitars on track 12
- Harley Pasternak – backing vocals on track 1
- Jeannie Martinez – backing vocals on track 1
- Kristen Moss – backing vocals on track 1
- Lee Padgett – backing vocals on track 1
- Maggie Slavonic – backing vocals on track 1
- Ricky Cytonbaum – backing vocals on track 1
- Sandy Vongdasy – backing vocals on track 1
- Scotty Crowe – backing vocals on track 1

=== Production ===
- Manny Marroquin – mixing on tracks 1, 2, 4, 8 and 12
- Michael Brauer – mixing on tracks 3, 5, 6, 7, 9, 10 and 11
- Jared Robbins – mixing assistance on tracks 1, 2, 4, 8 and 12
- Will Hensley – mixing assistance on tracks 3, 5, 6, 7, 9, 10 and 11
- Chad Franscoviak – engineering
- Joe Ferla – engineering
- Dave O'Donnell – engineering on tracks 1, 3 and 11
- John Alagía – engineering on track 7
- Angie Teo – engineering assistance, Pro Tools engineering
- Brian Montgomery – engineering assistance, Pro Tools engineering

- Bryan Pugh – engineering assistance, Pro Tools engineering
- Dan Monti – engineering assistance
- Jared Nugent – engineering assistance
- Jim Monti – engineering assistance
- Peter Doris – engineering assistance, Pro Tools engineering
- Vanessa Parr – engineering assistance
- Greg Calbi – mastering
- Martin Pradler – digital editing, Pro Tools engineering
- Nathaniel Kunkel – Pro Tools engineering

== Charts ==
=== Weekly charts ===
| Chart (2006–2007) | Peak position |
|---|---|
| Australian Albums (ARIA) | 12 |
| Canadian Albums (Billboard) | 2 |
| Danish Albums (Hitlisten) | 24 |
| Dutch Albums (Album Top 100) | 12 |
| German Albums (Offizielle Top 100) | 39 |
| New Zealand Albums (RMNZ) | 9 |
| UK Albums (Official Charts) | 46 |
| US Billboard 200 | 2 |
| US Top Rock Albums (Billboard) | 1 |

=== Year-end charts ===
| Chart (2006) | Position |
|---|---|
| Australian Albums (ARIA) | 98 |
| US Billboard 200 | 69 |
| US Top Rock Albums (Billboard) | 10 |
| Chart (2007) | Position |
| US Billboard 200 | 34 |
| US Top Rock Albums (Billboard) | 7 |
| Chart (2008) | Position |
| US Billboard 200 | 107 |

== Certifications ==
| Region | Certification | Certified units/sales |
|---|---|---|
| Australia (ARIA) | 2× Platinum | 140,000^{‡} |
| Canada (Music Canada) | 3× Platinum | 300,000^{‡} |
| Denmark (IFPI Danmark) | 4× Platinum | 80,000^{‡} |
| Netherlands (NVPI) | Gold | 35,000^{^} |
| New Zealand (RMNZ) | Gold | 7,500^{^} |
| United Kingdom (BPI) | Gold | 100,000^{‡} |
| United States (RIAA) | 4× Platinum | 4,000,000^{‡} |
^{^} Shipments figures based on certification alone.^{‡} Sales+streaming figures based on certification alone.

== Accolades ==
On December 7, 2006, Continuum was nominated for three Grammys. Including these, Mayer earned five nominations, in total – one nomination for Best Rock Album for Try! with the John Mayer Trio and another for Best Solo Rock Vocal Performance for "Route 66" from the Cars motion picture soundtrack. The album's lead single, "Waiting on the World to Change", was nominated and won in the category for Best Male Pop Vocal Performance. Continuum won the Grammy for Best Pop Vocal Album.

| Year | Award | Category |
|---|---|---|
| 2007 | Technical Excellence & Creativity Awards | Record Production/Album – Won |
| 2007 | 49th annual Grammy Awards | Album of the Year – nominated; Best Pop Vocal Album – Won; Best Male Pop Vocal Performance for "Waiting on the World to Change" – Won |
