= Belief (song) =

Single by John Mayer

from the album Continuum
- Released: September 2006
- Genre: Blues rock; alternative rock
- Length: 4:02
- Label: Aware
- Songwriter: John Mayer
- Producers: John Mayer; Steve Jordan

John Mayer singles chronology
"Waiting on the World to Change" (2006)	"Belief" (2006)	"Gravity" (2006)

"Belief" is the second single from John Mayer's 2006 album Continuum. The song features Ben Harper on guitar.

Despite its success on the American adult album alternative chart, the song never had a music video. The song was nominated for the Grammy Award for Best Male Pop Vocal Performance for the 50th Annual Grammy Awards.

== Personnel ==
- John Mayer – vocals, guitar
- Ben Harper – guitar
- Pino Palladino – bass
- Steve Jordan – drums
- Manolo Badrena – percussion

== Charts ==
Chart (2006–07)	Peak position
US Adult Alternative Airplay (Billboard)	9
