= Michael Brauer =

American mix engineer

Michael H. Brauer is an American mix engineer.

== Career ==
Brauer began his career at Media Sound Studios in New York City, rising from an entry-level position to staff engineer between 1976 and 1984, working alongside engineers including Bob Clearmountain, Mike Barbiero, and Tony Bongiovi before going freelance.

He received a Grammy for "Best Pop Vocal Album" for his work on John Mayer's Continuum, "Best Alternative Album" for Coldplay's Parachutes, and also "Best Rock Album" for Coldplay's Viva la Vida or Death and All His Friends. He has worked with artists such as Grandaddy, Coldplay, The Rolling Stones, Prefab Sprout, Deacon Blue, James Brown, Aerosmith, Jeff Buckley, David Byrne, Dream Theater, Tony Bennett, Billy Joel, Rod Stewart, Grayson Hugh, Paul McCartney, Ben Folds, Pet Shop Boys, Bob Dylan, Willie Nelson, KT Tunstall, Martha Wainwright, Pete Murray and Natalia Lafourcade.

== Style ==
Brauer is known for his self named implementation of multi-bus compression, referred to as 'Brauerizing', in which various instrumental sections of a mix are sent to different compressors in an ABCD implementation. He isn't the first to mix this way as most mix engineers use this kind of multi-bussing. His vocals are usually sent to separate compressors in parallel. These are each adjusted for their own timbral and tonal quality, and are then blended by ear into the stereo mixbus to achieve the desired result.

== Grammy Awards ==
- Angélique Kidjo – Sings (Best World Music Album) 2016
- Angélique Kidjo – Eve (Best World Music Album) 2015
- Calle 13 – Multi Viral (Latin Grammy: Best Urban Music Album) 2015
- Calle 13 – Multi Viral (Best Latin Rock, Urban or Alternative Album)
- John Mayer – Battle Studies (Best Engineered Album, Non-Classical) 2011
- Coldplay – Viva la Vida or Death and All His Friends (Best Rock Album) 2009
- John Mayer – Continuum (Best Pop Vocal Album) 2007
- Coldplay – Parachutes (Best Alternative Album) 2000

== RIAJ ==
- Zard – ZARD Blend: Sun&Stone (1997) (gold/double platinum)
