= Chad Franscoviak =

- Born: Chad Franscoviak; July 30, 1973 (age 52)
- Origin: Atlanta, Georgia
- Instrument: Sound engineer

Chad Franscoviak is a sound engineer and producer based out of Los Angeles, California. He is most well known for his work on John Mayer albums. The two were also roommates.

In 2003, Franscoviak helped friend David LaBruyere by engineering his album, which was released as the 2007 EP Farrago Dance Mix.

In February 2007, Franscoviak won Grammy Award for Best Pop Vocal Album at the 49th Annual Grammy Awards for the album Continuum (as the sound engineer).

In October 2007, Franscoviak won three TEC Awards.

In February 2011, Franscoviak (along with Michael H. Brauer, Joe Ferla, and Manny Marroquin) received the Grammy for Best Engineered Album, Non-Classical for his work as Recording Engineer on John Mayer's Battle Studies.

== Awards ==
Year	Award	Category	Nominated work	Nominated duty	Result
2006	49th Annual Grammy Awards	Best Pop Vocal Album	Continuum	Sound Engineer	Won
2007	23rd Annual TEC Awards	Tour Sound Production	John Mayer Continuum Tour	FOH engineer	Won
2007	23rd Annual TEC Awards	Record Production/Single or Track	"Waiting on the World to Change"	Recording Engineer	Won
2007	23rd Annual TEC Awards	Record Production/Album	Continuum	Recording Engineer	Won
2010	53rd Annual Grammy Awards	Best Engineered Album, Non-Classical	"Battle Studies"	Recording Engineer	Won

== Personal life ==
On November 24, 2012, Franscoviak married writer Maggie McGuane, the only daughter of the late Margot Kidder. Katy Perry and John Mayer were among the performers, and Mayer deejayed the event as well. The two live in Livingston, Montana, along with McGuane's children Maisie and Charlie Kirn, from a previous relationship.
