= John Mayer discography =

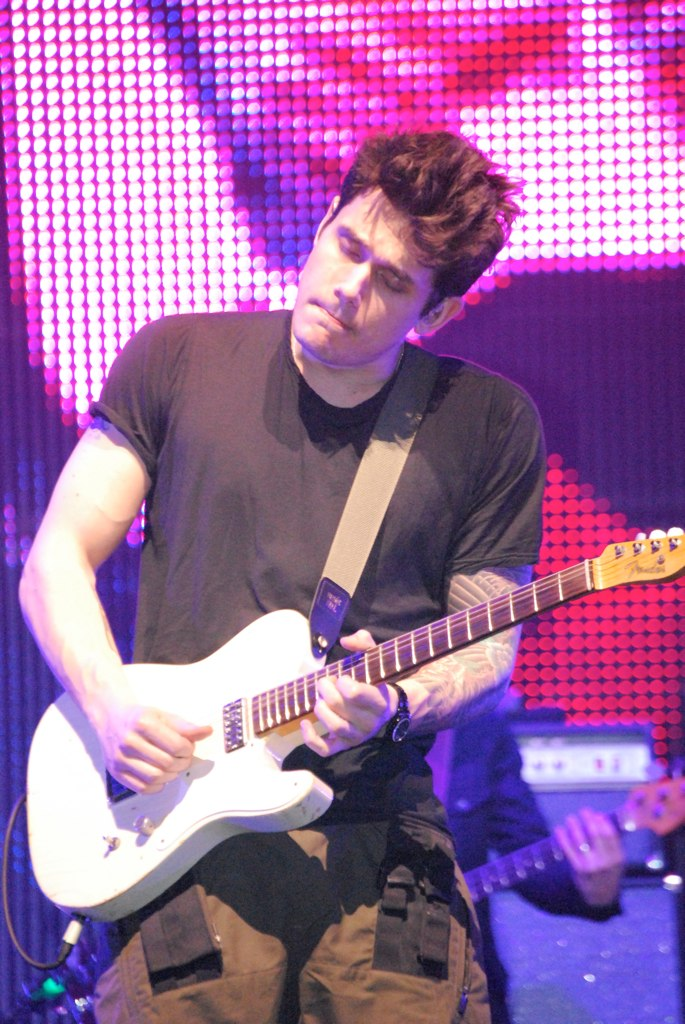
- Mayer performing his Battle Studies World Tour at State Farm Arena in Atlanta (March 17, 2010)
- Studio albums: 8
- Extended plays: 5
- Live albums: 7
- Compilation albums: 3
- Singles: 26
- Video albums: 2
- Music videos: 17

The American singer-songwriter and guitarist John Mayer has released eight studio albums, seven live albums, three compilation albums, two video albums, four extended plays, twenty-six singles and seventeen music videos. Born in Bridgeport, Connecticut, Mayer moved to Atlanta, Georgia and began playing in local clubs in 1998. He released the extended play Inside Wants Out in September of the following year. Inside Wants Out, as well as continued performances, brought Mayer to the attention of independent record label Aware Records. Aware later signed Mayer and released his full-length debut studio album, Room for Squares, in June 2001. When Columbia Records acquired Aware, the album was re-released in September and promoted as a major label release. Following its re-release, Room for Squares peaked at number eight on the United States Billboard 200. The album has since sold over five million copies in the United States, and was certified five times platinum by the Recording Industry Association of America (RIAA). Three singles were released from Room for Squares, two of which became top 40 hits on the US Billboard Hot 100: "No Such Thing" and "Your Body Is a Wonderland". Heavier Things, Mayer's second studio album, was released in September 2003. It topped the Billboard 200 and attained a double platinum certification from the RIAA. Heavier Things produced three singles: "Bigger than My Body", "Clarity" and "Daughters". "Daughters" later won the award for Song of the Year at the 47th Grammy Awards.

After a brief recording hiatus, during which he ventured to form the blues group John Mayer Trio, Mayer resumed his solo career and released his third studio album Continuum in September 2006. Continuum reached a peak of number two on the Billboard 200. "Waiting on the World to Change", the album's first single, peaked at number 14 on the Billboard Hot 100 and garnered commercial success in countries such as Australia and Canada. Battle Studies followed in November 2009, topping the Billboard 200 and being certified platinum by the RIAA. The album featured the singles "Who Says", "Heartbreak Warfare" and "Half of My Heart", all of which reached the top 40 in the United States. Mayer released his fifth studio album Born and Raised in May 2012; it became his third number-one album on the Billboard 200. His sixth studio album Paradise Valley was released on August 20, 2013, bringing forth 3 singles: "Paper Doll", "Wildfire" and "Who You Love" featuring Katy Perry. Mayer's seventh studio album, The Search for Everything, was released in April 2017.

Mayer has sold 16 million albums in the United States as of January 2015.

== Albums ==
=== Studio albums ===
List of studio albums, with selected chart positions, sales figures and certifications
| Title | Album details | Peak chart positions | | | | | | | | | | Sales | Certifications |
| Title | Album details | US | US Rock | AUS | CAN | DEN | GER | IRL | NLD | NZ | UK | Sales | Certifications |
|---|---|---|---|---|---|---|---|---|---|---|---|---|---|
| Room for Squares | Released: September 18, 2001 (US); Label: Columbia; Formats: LP, CD, SACD, DualDisc, Cassette, digital download | 8 | — | 5 | 9 | — | 55 | — | — | 6 | 128 | US: 4,484,000 | RIAA: 5× Platinum; ARIA: 3× Platinum; BPI: Silver; IFPI DEN: 3× Platinum; MC: 2× Platinum; RMNZ: Platinum |
| Heavier Things | Released: September 9, 2003 (US); Label: Columbia; Formats: LP, CD, SACD, DualDisc, Cassette, digital download | 1 | — | 4 | 3 | 5 | 60 | 72 | 19 | 15 | 74 | US: 2,700,000 | RIAA: 3× Platinum; ARIA: 2× Platinum; BPI: Silver; IFPI DEN: 2× Platinum; MC: Platinum; NVPI: Gold |
| Continuum | Released: September 12, 2006 (US); Label: Columbia; Formats: LP, CD, digital download | 2 | 1 | 12 | 2 | 24 | 39 | — | 12 | 9 | 46 | US: 2,426,000 | RIAA: 4× Platinum; ARIA: 2× Platinum; BPI: Gold; IFPI DEN: 4× Platinum; MC: 3× Platinum; NVPI: Gold; RMNZ: 2× Platinum |
| Battle Studies | Released: November 17, 2009 (US); Label: Columbia; Formats: LP, CD, digital download | 1 | 1 | 3 | 4 | 7 | 39 | 48 | 1 | 11 | 35 | US: 1,100,000 | RIAA: 2× Platinum; ARIA: Platinum; BPI: Gold; IFPI DEN: 3× Platinum; MC: Platinum; NVPI: Gold; RMNZ: Platinum |
| Born and Raised | Released: May 22, 2012 (US); Label: Columbia; Formats: LP, CD, digital download | 1 | 1 | 1 | 1 | 1 | 17 | 14 | 1 | 1 | 4 | US: 514,000 | RIAA: Gold; ARIA: Gold; BPI: Silver; IFPI DEN: Platinum; MC: Platinum; NVPI: Gold; RMNZ: Gold |
| Paradise Valley | Released: August 20, 2013 (US); Label: Columbia; Formats: LP, CD, digital download | 2 | 1 | 1 | 1 | 1 | 17 | 7 | 1 | 6 | 4 | | RIAA: Gold; ARIA: Gold; BPI: Silver; IFPI DEN: Platinum; MC: Gold; RMNZ: Gold |
| The Search for Everything | Released: April 14, 2017 (US); Label: Columbia; Formats: LP, CD, digital download | 2 | 1 | 5 | 2 | 7 | 44 | 30 | 4 | 10 | 16 | CAN: 30,000 | RIAA: Gold; ARIA: Gold; BPI: Silver; IFPI DEN: Platinum; MC: Platinum; RMNZ: Gold |
| Sob Rock | Released: July 16, 2021 (US); Label: Columbia; Formats: LP, CD, cassette, digital download | 2 | 1 | 3 | 4 | 4 | 5 | 14 | 1 | 4 | 4 | | RIAA: Gold; IFPI DEN: Platinum; MC: Gold; RMNZ: Gold |
"—" denotes a recording that did not chart or was not released in that territory.

=== Live albums ===
List of live albums, with selected chart positions and certifications
| Title | Album details | Peak chart positions | | | | | | | | | Certifications |
| Title | Album details | US | US Rock | AUS | CAN | DEN | GER | NLD | NZ | UK | Certifications |
|---|---|---|---|---|---|---|---|---|---|---|---|
| Any Given Thursday | Released: February 11, 2003 (US); Label: Aware, Columbia; Formats: CD | 17 | — | 63 | — | — | — | — | 43 | — | RIAA: Platinum |
| As/Is: Volume Two (Live @ Mountain View, CA – 7/16/04) | Released: August 10, 2004 (US); Label: Aware, Columbia; Formats: Digital download | — | — | — | — | — | — | — | — | — | |
| As/Is: Volume Three (Live @ Houston, TX – 7/24/04) | Released: August 17, 2004 (US); Label: Aware, Columbia; Formats: Digital download | — | — | — | — | — | — | — | — | — | |
| As/Is: Volume Four (Cleveland / Cincinnati, OH – 8/03/04–8/04/04) | Released: August 24, 2004 (US); Label: Aware, Columbia; Formats: Digital download | — | — | — | — | — | — | — | — | — | |
| As/Is: Volume Five (Live @ Philadelphia, PA & Hartford, CT – 8/14/04–8/15/04) | Released: August 31, 2004 (US); Label: Aware, Columbia; Formats: Digital download | — | — | — | — | — | — | — | — | — | |
| As/Is | Released: October 19, 2004 (US); Label: Aware, Columbia; Formats: CD, digital download | — | — | — | — | — | — | — | — | — | |
| Where the Light Is: John Mayer Live in Los Angeles | Released: July 1, 2008 (US); Label: Columbia; Formats: CD, LP, digital download | 5 | 2 | 30 | 9 | 15 | 81 | 16 | 22 | 125 | RIAA: Platinum; ARIA: 3× Platinum (DVD); IFPI DEN: 2× Platinum |
"—" denotes a recording that did not chart or was not released in that territory.

=== Compilation albums ===
List of compilation albums, with selected chart positions
| Title | Album details | Peak chart positions |
| Title | Album details | NLD |
|---|---|---|
| 2CD: Room for Squares / Heavier Things | Released: September 17, 2007 (US); Label: Columbia; Formats: CD box set | — |
| 3CD: Room for Squares / Heavier Things / Continuum | Released: April 13, 2009 (US); Label: Columbia; Formats: CD box set | 77 |
| The Collection: John Mayer (5 Complete Albums) | Released: December 13, 2011 (US); Label: Aware, Sony BMG; Formats: Digital download | — |
"—" denotes a recording that did not chart or was not released in that territory.

=== Video albums ===
List of video albums, with selected chart positions and certifications
| Title | Album details | Peak chart positions | | Certifications |
| Title | Album details | US Video | AUS DVD | Certifications |
|---|---|---|---|---|
| Any Given Thursday | Released: February 11, 2003 (US); Label: Sony BMG; Formats: DVD | 2 | 4 | RIAA: 2× Platinum; ARIA: 3× Platinum |
| Where the Light Is | Released: July 1, 2008 (US); Label: Columbia; Formats: DVD, Blu-ray | 1 | 2 | RIAA: Platinum; ARIA: 3× Platinum |

== Extended plays ==
List of extended plays, with selected chart positions
| Title | Details | Peak chart positions | | | |
| Title | Details | US | US Rock | CAN | DEN |
|---|---|---|---|---|---|
| Inside Wants Out | Released: September 24, 1999 (US); Label: Mayer; Format: CD | 22 | — | — | — |
| As/Is: Volume One | Released: December 1, 2003 (US); Label: Aware, Columbia; Format: Digital download | — | — | — | — |
| The Village Sessions | Released: December 12, 2006 (US); Label: Aware, Columbia; Format: CD | — | — | 77 | — |
| The Complete 2012 Performances Collection | Released: August 3, 2012 (US); Label: Columbia; Formats: CD, LP, digital download | 17 | 3 | — | 15 |
| The Search for Everything: Wave One | Released: January 20, 2017 (US); Label: Columbia; Formats: Digital download | 2 | 1 | 2 | 8 |
| The Search for Everything: Wave Two | Released: February 24, 2017 (US); Label: Columbia; Formats: Digital download | 13 | 1 | 13 | — |
"—" denotes a recording that did not chart or was not released in that territory.

== Singles ==
=== As lead artist ===
List of singles as lead artist, with selected chart positions and certifications, showing year released and album name
| Title | Year | Peak chart positions | | | | | | | | | | Certifications | Album |
| Title | Year | US | US AAA | US Adult | US Rock | AUS | CAN | DEN | NLD | NZ | UK | Certifications | Album |
|---|---|---|---|---|---|---|---|---|---|---|---|---|---|
| "No Such Thing" | 2002 | 13 | 1 | 5 | — | 28 | — | — | 97 | 14 | 42 | RIAA: Platinum; ARIA: Platinum | Room for Squares |
| "Your Body Is a Wonderland" | 2002 | 18 | 1 | 3 | — | 23 | — | — | — | 9 | — | RIAA: 2× Platinum; ARIA: 3× Platinum; BPI: Silver; IFPI DEN: Platinum; RMNZ: 3× Platinum | Room for Squares |
| "Why Georgia" | 2003 | — (Note: "Why Georgia" did not enter the Billboard Hot 100, but peaked at number two on the Bubbling Under Hot 100 chart, which acts as an extension to the Hot 100.) | 2 | 8 | — | 81 | — | — | — | 23 | — | RIAA: Gold; ARIA: Gold; RMNZ: Gold | Room for Squares |
| "Bigger than My Body" | 2003 | 33 | 1 | 4 | — | 38 | — | — | — | 21 | 72 | | Heavier Things |
| "Clarity" | 2004 | — (Note: "Clarity" did not enter the Billboard Hot 100, but peaked at number 25 on the Bubbling Under Hot 100 Singles chart, which acts as an extension to the Hot 100.) | 1 | 13 | — | — | — | — | 80 | 45 | — | | Heavier Things |
| "Daughters" | 2004 | 19 | 6 | 1 | — | 53 | — | — | 29 | — | — | RIAA: 2× Platinum; ARIA: Platinum; RMNZ: Platinum | Heavier Things |
| "Waiting on the World to Change" | 2006 | 14 | 1 | 2 | — | — (Note: "Waiting on the World to Change" was not eligible to enter the ARIA Singles Chart as it was not released as a CD single in Australia and songs without a physical release could not chart due to chart rules in place in 2006, but peaked at number 17 on the ARIA Digital Track Chart.) | 22 | — | 55 | 36 | 115 | RIAA: 4× Platinum; ARIA: 3× Platinum; IFPI DEN: Platinum; MC: Platinum; RMNZ: 3× Platinum | Continuum |
| "Gravity" | 2007 | 71 | 18 | 10 | — | — | — | — | 66 | — | — | RIAA: 2× Platinum; ARIA: Platinum; IFPI DEN: Platinum; RMNZ: 3× Platinum | Continuum |
| "Belief" | 2007 | — | 9 | — | — | — | — | — | — | — | — | | Continuum |
| "Dreaming with a Broken Heart" | 2007 | 99 | — | 8 | — | — | 69 | — | 96 | — | — | RIAA: Platinum | Continuum |
| "Say" | 2007 | 12 | 17 | 6 | — | 47 | 27 | — | — | — | — | RIAA: 3× Platinum; ARIA: Gold; RMNZ: Gold | Continuum |
| "Free Fallin'" | 2008 | 51 | 22 | 33 | — | 52 | 14 | — | — | — | 147 | RIAA: 2× Platinum; ARIA: 2× Platinum; BPI: Gold; IFPI DEN: Platinum; RMNZ: 2× Platinum | Where the Light Is |
| "Who Says" | 2009 | 17 | 1 | 19 | 34 | 31 | 24 | 8 | 13 | — | — | RIAA: Platinum; ARIA: Platinum; IFPI DEN: Platinum; RMNZ: Gold | Battle Studies |
| "Heartbreak Warfare" | 2009 | 34 | 3 | 3 | 39 | 31 | 62 | 29 | 6 | 34 | — | RIAA: Platinum; ARIA: Platinum; IFPI DEN: Platinum; RMNZ: Gold | Battle Studies |
| "Half of My Heart" (featuring Taylor Swift) | 2010 | 25 | 2 | 2 | 44 | 71 | 53 | — | 40 | — | — | RIAA: Platinum; ARIA: Gold; IFPI DEN: Gold; RMNZ: Gold | Battle Studies |
| "Perfectly Lonely" | 2010 | — | — | — | — | — | — | — | 52 | — | — | | Battle Studies |
| "Shadow Days" | 2012 | 42 | 2 | 12 | 38 | — | 49 | 39 | 23 | — | — | | Born and Raised |
| "Queen of California" | 2012 | — (Note: "Queen of California" did not enter the Billboard Hot 100, but peaked at number seven on the Bubbling Under Hot 100 Singles chart, which acts as an extension to the Hot 100.) | 2 | 40 | 38 | — | — | — | — | — | — | | Born and Raised |
| "Something Like Olivia" | 2012 | — | — | — | — | — | — | — | — | — | — | | Born and Raised |
| "Paper Doll" | 2013 | 77 | 10 | — | 10 | — | 95 | 37 | 58 | — | 126 | | Paradise Valley |
| "Wildfire" | 2013 | 85 | 19 | — | 13 | — | 94 | — | 77 | — | — | IFPI DEN: Gold | Paradise Valley |
| "Who You Love" (featuring Katy Perry) | 2013 | 48 | — | 18 | 11 | 83 | 70 | — | — | — | — | RIAA: Gold; ARIA: Gold; IFPI DEN: Gold; RMNZ: Gold | Paradise Valley |
| "XO" | 2014 | 90 | — | — | 13 | 81 | 76 | — | 95 | — | 115 | RIAA: Gold; ARIA: Platinum; BPI: Silver; IFPI DEN: Platinum; RMNZ: Platinum | Non-album single |
| "Love on the Weekend" | 2016 | 53 | 3 | 19 | 5 | 65 | 69 | — | 64 | — (Note: "Love on the Weekend" did not enter the NZ Top 40 Singles Chart, but peaked at number six on the NZ Heatseekers Singles Chart.) | — | RIAA: Gold; ARIA: Gold; IFPI DEN: Platinum; RMNZ: Gold | The Search for Everything |
| "Still Feel Like Your Man" | 2017 | — | — | — | 13 | — | — | — | 93 | — (Note: "Still Feel Like Your Man" did not enter the NZ Top 40 Singles Chart, but peaked at number five on the NZ Heatseeker Singles Chart.) | — | | The Search for Everything |
| "In the Blood" | 2017 | — | — | — | 13 | — | — | — | — | — | — | RIAA: Gold | The Search for Everything |
| "New Light" | 2018 | — (Note: "New Light" did not enter the Billboard Hot 100, but peaked at number five on the Bubbling Under Hot 100 Singles chart, which acts as an extension to the Hot 100.) | 9 | 10 | 7 | — | — | — | 29 | — (Note: "New Light" did not enter the NZ Top 40 Singles Chart, but peaked at number seven on the NZ Heatseeker Singles Chart and at number 10 on the NZ Hot Singles Chart.) | — | RIAA: 2× Platinum; ARIA: Gold; BPI: Silver; IFPI DEN: Platinum; MC: Gold; NVPI: Platinum; RMNZ: 2× Platinum | Sob Rock |
| "I Guess I Just Feel Like" | 2019 | 94 | 22 | 28 | 6 | — | — | — | — | — (Note: "I Guess I Just Feel Like" did not enter the NZ Top 40 Singles Chart, but peaked at number 10 on the NZ Hot Singles Chart.) | — | RIAA: Gold; ARIA: Gold; IFPI DEN: Gold; RMNZ: Gold | Sob Rock |
| "Carry Me Away" | 2019 | — (Note: "Carry Me Away" did not enter the Billboard Hot 100, but peaked at number five on the Bubbling Under Hot 100 chart, which acts as an extension to the Hot 100.) | 38 | — | 3 | — | — | — | — | — (Note: "Carry Me Away" did not enter the NZ Top 40 Singles Chart, but peaked at number 27 on the NZ Hot Singles Chart.) | — | | Sob Rock |
| "Last Train Home" | 2021 | — (Note: "Last Train Home" did not enter the Billboard Hot 100, but peaked at number one on the Bubbling Under Hot 100 chart, which acts as an extension to the Hot 100.) | 1 | — | 13 | — | 88 | — | 20 | — (Note: "Last Train Home" did not enter the NZ Top 40 Singles Chart, but peaked at number four on the NZ Hot Singles Chart.) | 91 | | Sob Rock |
| "Wild Blue" | 2021 | — | 1 | 20 | 21 | — | — | — | — | — (Note: "Wild Blue" did not enter the NZ Top 40 Singles Chart, but peaked at number 24 on the NZ Hot Singles Chart.) | — | | Sob Rock |
| "Phone, Keys, Wallet" (with Lainey Wilson) | 2026 | 43 | — | — | — | — | 42 | — | — | — | — | | TBA |
| "Tom and Jerry" | 2026 | 77 | 33 | 24 | 20 | — | — | — | 69 | — (Note: "Tom and Jerry" did not enter the NZ Top 40 Singles Chart, but peaked at number 6 on the NZ Hot Singles Chart.) | — | | TBA |
"—" denotes a recording that did not chart or was not released in that territory.

=== As featured artist ===
List of singles as featured artist, with selected chart positions, showing year released and album name
| Title | Year | Peak chart positions | | | | | | | | | | Certifications | Album |
| Title | Year | US | US R&B | US Rap | AUS | AUT | CAN | IRL | NLD | NZ | UK | Certifications | Album |
|---|---|---|---|---|---|---|---|---|---|---|---|---|---|
| "Go!" (Common featuring John Mayer and Kanye West) | 2005 | 79 | 31 | 21 | — | — | — | — | — | — | 79 | | Be |
| "Beat It" (Fall Out Boy featuring John Mayer) | 2008 | 19 | — | — | 13 | 75 | 8 | 21 | 98 | 14 | 21 | BPI: Silver; RIAA: Platinum | Live in Phoenix |
| "Inside Friend" (Leon Bridges featuring John Mayer) | 2020 | — | — | — | — | — | — | — | — | — | — | | Non-album single |
"—" denotes a recording that did not chart or was not released in that territory.

== Other charted songs ==
List of songs, with selected chart positions, showing year released and album name
| Title | Year | Peak chart positions | | | | | | | | | | Certifications | Album |
| Title | Year | US | US Jazz | US AAA | US Pop | US Rock | CAN | NLD | NZ Hot | SWE Heat. | WW | Certifications | Album |
|---|---|---|---|---|---|---|---|---|---|---|---|---|---|
| "Stitched Up" (Herbie Hancock featuring John Mayer) | 2005 | — | 8 | 10 | — | — | — | — | — | — | — | | Possibilities |
| "Slow Dancing in a Burning Room" | 2006 | — | — | — | — | — | — | — | — | — | — | RIAA: Platinum; ARIA: Platinum; BPI: Gold; IFPI DEN: Platinum | Continuum |
| "The Heart of Life" | 2006 | — | — | — | — | — | — | — | — | — | — | RIAA: Gold | Continuum |
| "Lesson Learned" (Alicia Keys featuring John Mayer) | 2007 | — (Note: "Lesson Learned" did not enter the Billboard Hot 100, but peaked at number four on the Bubbling Under Hot 100 Singles chart, which acts as an extension to the Hot 100.) | — | — | 72 | — | — | — | — | — | — | | As I Am |
| "Dear Marie" | 2013 | — | — | — | — | 30 | — | — | — | — | — | | Paradise Valley |
| "Waitin' on the Day" | 2013 | — | — | — | — | 40 | — | — | — | — | — | | Paradise Valley |
| "I Will Be Found (Lost at Sea)" | 2013 | — | — | — | — | 41 | — | — | — | — | — | | Paradise Valley |
| "Moving On and Getting Over" | 2017 | — (Note: "Moving On and Getting Over" did not enter the Billboard Hot 100, but peaked at number two on the Bubbling Under Hot 100 Singles chart, which acts as an extension to the Hot 100.) | — | — | — | 8 | — | 52 | — (Note: "Moving On and Getting Over" did not enter the NZ Top 40 Singles Chart, but peaked at number three on the NZ Heatseeker Singles Chart.) | — | — | | The Search for Everything |
| "Changing" | 2017 | — | — | — | — | 12 | — | — | — (Note: "Changing" did not enter the NZ Top 40 Singles Chart, but peaked at number seven on the NZ Heatseeker Singles Chart.) | — | — | | The Search for Everything |
| "You're Gonna Live Forever in Me" | 2017 | — | — | — | — | 10 | — | — | — | — | — | | The Search for Everything |
| "Emoji of a Wave" | 2017 | — | — | — | — | 23 | — | — | — | — | — | | The Search for Everything |
| "Helpless" | 2017 | — | — | — | — | 21 | — | — | — | — | — | | The Search for Everything |
| "Roll It on Home" | 2017 | — | — | — | — | 33 | — | — | — | — | — | | The Search for Everything |
| "Theme from 'The Search for Everything'" | 2017 | — | — | — | — | 37 | — | — | — | — | — | | The Search for Everything |
| "Never on the Day You Leave" | 2017 | — | — | — | — | 25 | — | — | — | — | — | | The Search for Everything |
| "Rosie" | 2017 | — | — | — | — | 18 | — | — | — | — | — | | The Search for Everything |
| "Outta My Head" (Khalid featuring John Mayer) | 2019 | 58 | — | — | — | — | — | — | — | — | — | ARIA: Gold | Free Spirit |
| "Shouldn't Matter but It Does" | 2021 | — | — | — | — | 18 | — | — | 26 | — | — | | Sob Rock |
| "Why You No Love Me" | 2021 | — | — | — | — | 28 | — | — | — | — | — | | Sob Rock |
| "Shot in the Dark" | 2021 | — (Note: "Shot in the Dark" did not enter the Billboard Hot 100, but peaked at number 24 on the Bubbling Under Hot 100 chart, which acts as an extension to the Hot 100.) | — | — | — | 14 | — | 68 | 17 | 13 | — | | Sob Rock |
| "Til the Right One Comes" | 2021 | — | — | — | — | 24 | — | — | — | — | — | | Sob Rock |
| "All I Want Is to Be with You" | 2021 | — | — | — | — | 30 | — | — | — | — | — | | Sob Rock |
| "Better Days" (Zach Bryan featuring John Mayer) | 2024 | 46 | — | — | — | 8 | 49 | — | — | — | 147 | RIAA: Gold | The Great American Bar Scene |
"—" denotes a recording that did not chart or was not released in that territory.

== Other appearances ==
List of non-single guest appearances, with other performing artists, showing year released and album name
| Title | Year | Other artist(s) | Album |
|---|---|---|---|
| "Tonic" and "Havasu Falls" | 1999 | Michelle Malone | Home Grown |
| "Your Body Is a Wonderland" | 2001 | None | Live in the X Lounge IV |
| "No Such Thing" | 2002 | None | Live in the X Lounge V |
| "Bliss" | 2002 | Alice Peacock | Alice Peacock |
| "Streetcorner Symphony" | 2005 | Rob Thomas | ...Something to Be |
| "I Don't Need No Doctor" | 2005 | John Scofield | That's What I Say |
| "Piece of My Heart" | 2005 | Eric Clapton | Back Home |
| “Stitched Up” | 2005 | Herbie Hancock | Possibilities |
| "Hummingbird" | 2005 | B.B. King | B.B. King & Friends: 80 |
| "I've Got Dreams to Remember" | 2005 | Buddy Guy | Bring 'Em In |
| "(Get Your Kicks On) Route 66" | 2006 | Steve Jordan, Pino Palladino | Cars soundtrack |
| "Bittersweet Poetry" | 2007 | Kanye West | Graduation |
| "Lesson Learned" | 2007 | Alicia Keys | As I Am |
| "Short and Sweet" | 2009 | Spinal Tap | Back from the Dead |
| "Glad to Be Unhappy" | 2009 | Chris Botti | Chris Botti in Boston |
| "Time to Move" | 2009 | Crosby Loggins | Time To Move |
| "Gone" | 2010 | Bishop Lamont | The Reformation |
| "Letter" | 2010 | Wale | Live from the Dmv, Vol. 2 |
| "Pyramids" and "White" | 2012 | Frank Ocean | Channel Orange |
| "Lies", 'Magnolia", "Don't Wait" | 2014 | Eric Clapton & Friends | The Breeze: An Appreciation of JJ Cale |
| "Come Rain or Come Shine" | 2014 | Barbra Streisand | Partners |
| "Rock Me Baby" and "Born Under a Bad Sign" | 2016 | Melissa Etheridge | MEmphis Rock and Soul |
| "How Would You Feel (Paean)" (Note: Uncredited guitar solo.) | 2017 | Ed Sheeran | ÷ |
| "New Balance" and "Newer Balance (Freestyle)" | 2017 | Jhené Aiko | Trip |
| "Like to Be You" | 2018 | Shawn Mendes | Shawn Mendes |
| "Small Worlds" | 2018 | Mac Miller | Swimming |
| "Wake Up", "Astrothunder" and "Can't Say" | 2018 | Travis Scott | Astroworld |
| "Fuck the Rain" | 2019 | Ryan Adams | Big Colors |
| "Outta My Head" | 2019 | Khalid | Free Spirit |
| "Superposition" and "Are You OK?" | 2019 | Daniel Caesar | Case Study 01 |
| "Forever Young" | 2020 | The Hush Money | Maiden America |
| "3am" | 2020 | Halsey | Manic |
| "Here's Hopin'" | 2021 | JP Saxe | Dangerous Levels of Introspection |
| "Calling on America" | 2021 | Martin Sexton | 2020 Vision |
| "Poison" | 2022 | Jack Harlow | Come Home the Kids Miss You |
| "Cinema" and "Daydreaming" | 2022 | Harry Styles | Harry's House |
| "Never Gonna Be Alone" | 2022 | Jacob Collier | Djesse Vol. 4 |
| "I Don't Miss You" | 2023 | JP Saxe | A Grey Area |
| "In the Meantime" | 2023 | Bettye LaVette | LaVette! |
| "Sirens" | 2023 | Travis Scott | Utopia |
| "Forever Young" | 2024 | David Ryan Harris | Maiden America |
| "Automatic Yes" | 2024 | Zedd | Telos |
| "Moon So High" | 2026 | Remi Wolf | Mud |

== Music videos ==
=== As lead artist ===
List of music videos as lead artist, showing year released and director
| Title | Year | Director(s) | Ref. |
|---|---|---|---|
| "No Such Thing" | 2002 | Sam Erickson | |
| "Your Body Is a Wonderland" | 2002 | Jim Gable | |
| "Why Georgia" | 2003 | Sam Erickson | |
| "Bigger than My Body" | 2003 | Nigel Dick | |
| "Clarity" | 2004 | Little X | |
| "Daughters" | 2004 | Mario Sorrenti | |
| "Waiting on the World to Change" | 2006 | Philip Andelman | |
| "In Repair" | 2006 | Sam Erickson | |
| "Say" | 2007 | Vem | |
| "Who Says" | 2009 | Anthony Mandler | |
| "Heartbreak Warfare" (version 1) | 2009 | —N/a | |
| "Heartbreak Warfare" (version 2) | 2009 | Vance Burberry | |
| "Half of My Heart" (featuring Taylor Swift) | 2010 | P. R. Brown | |
| "Shadow Days" | 2012 | Philip Andelman | |
| "Queen of California" | 2012 | Sam Jones | |
| "Who You Love" (featuring Katy Perry) | 2013 | Sophie Muller | |
| "Still Feel Like Your Man" | 2017 | Tomás Whitmore | |
| "New Light" | 2018 | Fatal Farm | |
| "Carry Me Away" | 2019 | Daniel Prakopcyk and John Mayer | |
| "Last Train Home" | 2021 | Cameron Duddy and Harper Smith | |
| "Shot in the Dark" | 2021 | Mathew Cullen | |
| "Wild Blue" | 2021 | Mathew Cullen | |

=== As featured artist ===
List of music videos as featured artist, showing year released and director
| Title | Year | Director(s) |
|---|---|---|
| "Go!" (Common featuring John Mayer and Kanye West) | 2005 | Kanye West, MK12, Convert |
| "Beat It" (Fall Out Boy featuring John Mayer) | 2008 | Shane Drake |

== See also ==
- John Mayer Trio discography
