= John Mayer Trio =

American blues rock band

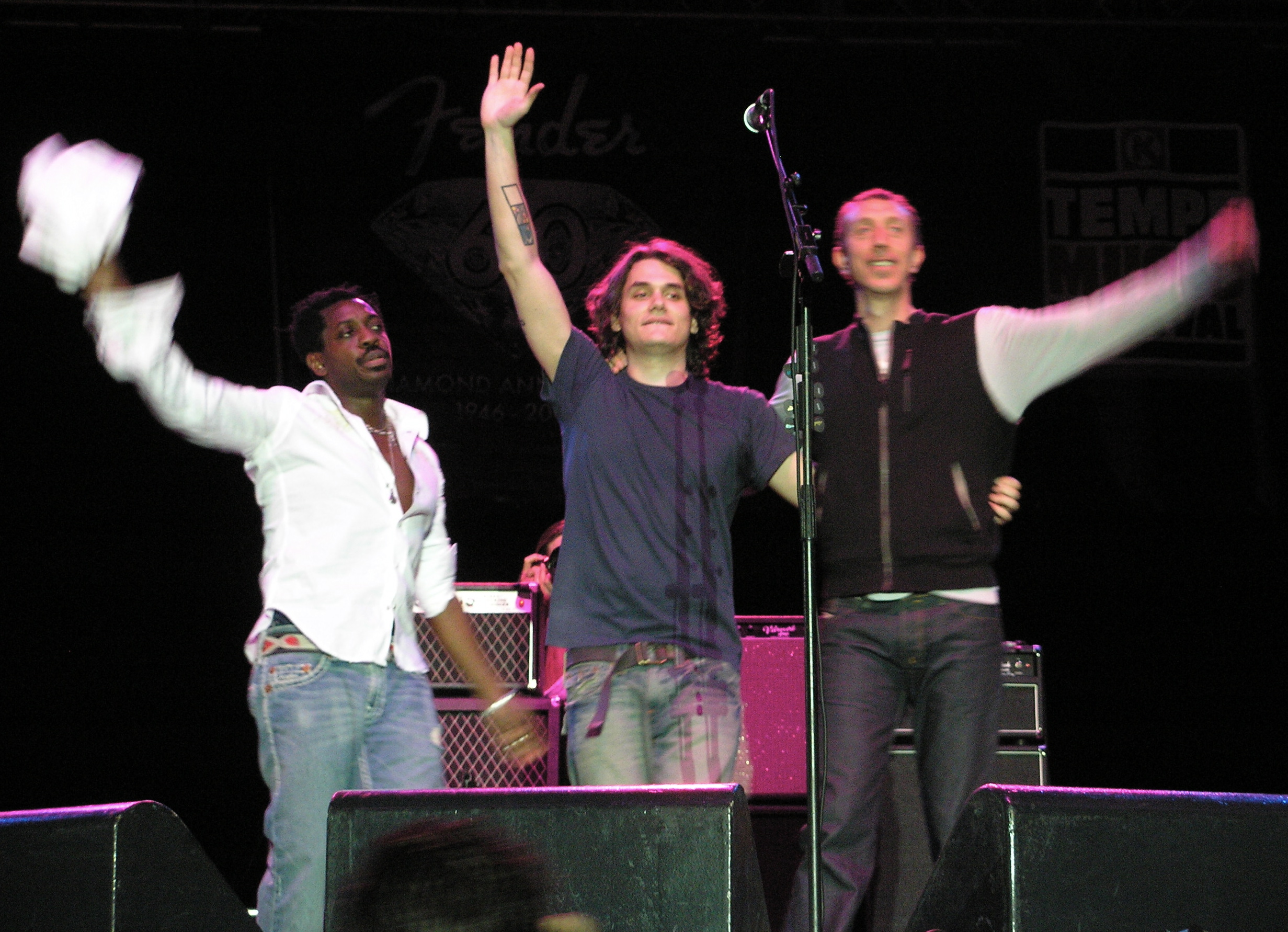
- L – R: Steve Jordan, John Mayer, Pino Palladino

Background information
- Origin: Los Angeles, California, United States
- Genres: Blues rock, electric blues
- Years active: 2005–present
- Labels: Aware, Columbia
- Members: John Mayer; Pino Palladino; Steve Jordan
- Website: johnmayer.com

The John Mayer Trio is a blues rock band that formed in Los Angeles, California in 2005. Comprising singer-songwriter and guitarist John Mayer, bassist Pino Palladino and drummer Steve Jordan, the band has released one live album, Try! in 2005. Three of the songs on the album were co-written by Jordan, Mayer, and Palladino, and the album was co-produced by Mayer and Jordan.

== History ==
=== Formation and Try! (2005) ===
In 2005, Mayer and Jordan had committed to a telethon on NBC, with bassist Willie Weeks entitled Tsunami Aid: A Concert of Hope to raise funds and public awareness benefiting victims in the aftermath of the tsunami that struck southeast Asia. However, as the date arrived, Weeks was unable to make the gig, and Jordan suggested high-profile bassist Pino Palladino instead. When the three joined to play, they noted a chemistry between them, and formed the Trio to play what Mayer called, "power-rockin', electric-guitar, in-your-face blues." In October 2005 the band toured as the opening act for The Rolling Stones on some A Bigger Bang Tour dates. As feedback from the tour began pouring in, the reviews were a polarizing mix; commenting on the Trio's October 6, 2005, show, Alan Light, with Rolling Stone, said, "Make no mistake: One-time Berklee College of Music student Mayer is a badass guitar player. Backed by studio aces Steve Jordan on drums and Pino Palladino on bass...his blues playing was consistently impressive." "But", he added, "he's a bit too eager to impress."

In February 2005, the trio played Mayer's single "Daughters" at the 47th Grammy Awards, for which Mayer went on to win the award for Best Male Vocal Performance later that night (though the Trio performed, the act was announced only as "John Mayer"). The Trio released "Come When I Call" exclusively to iTunes. While Rolling Stone said the for-download-only single "screams vanity project", they conceded that "Mayer is a surprisingly convincing mini Stevie Ray Vaughan" and gave the song three out of four stars. Another reviewer noted that "mixed in with the Stevie Ray Vaughan and Eric Clapton-esque music, there are a few mellow numbers", notably from Mayer's Heavier Things.

=== Post-Try! (2006–09) ===
On April 1, 2006, Mayer announced that the trio had played their final performance for that tour at a concert at the Tempe Music Festival in Tempe, Arizona. The three musicians had agreed to release a record, but when the time came to produce it, they came up "about three songs short", Jordan remembers. They went to work to write songs together, and from their collaborations, Mayer, Palladino, and Jordan wrote three songs on the album: "Good Love Is On The Way", "Vultures" and "Try".

Mayer's experience with the Trio influenced his production style on Continuum, and he and Jordan produced the album. He remarked "The artist gets almost trained to believe it takes 60 people and 12 months to make a record. It takes four people. You get it on tape, you listen back and ask, 'Does it make you feel something, yes or no?' When you got it, you move on." On September 12, 2006, the day of Mayer's solo release Continuum (which contains songs from the Trio album Try!), he announced on his blog that the group would reunite and produce a studio album.

The Trio teamed up for another performance on December 8, 2007, where Mayer performed an acoustic set, a set with the Trio and then a set with his band. The performance is featured on Mayer's live DVD Where the Light Is, released on July 1, 2008.

The Trio reunited on June 4, 2009, to play the song "California Dreamin'" on The Tonight Show with Conan O'Brien. They reunited twice more in 2009, on December 29 at Copley Symphony Hall in San Diego for Mayer's third annual Charity Revue, and on December 31 for a special black-tie New Year's Eve performance at The Joint at the Hard Rock Hotel in Las Vegas. Also the Trio were brought together for an impromptu reunion during Eric Clapton's Crossroads Guitar Festival, Chicago, Ill., (June) 2010.

Released November 17, 2009, John Mayer’s solo album “Battle Studies” features the full trio on six tracks (Jordan and Palladino would individually contribute to, eventually, every song on the record.)

During the years since Try! was released, Palladino has been busy with session work, and his membership as the touring bassist for The Who, with Jordan also contributing his talent in recording sessions, and in his role as a record producer.

In an interview on January 23, 2014, Mayer announced that the trio is "coming back." On February 27, 2014, the trio reunited in a Late Night with Seth Meyers episode to play JJ Cale's "After Midnight".

=== The Search for Everything (2016) ===
On January 10, 2016, John Mayer posted a photo on his Instagram feed with a caption reading "In the studio, day one." The photo features the three members of the Trio together, almost two years removed from their last public performance.

The trio formed the core of the studio band that recorded The Search for Everything, though it was released solely under his name as his seventh album. Prior to being released as an album, eight of the tracks were released on two EPs: The Search for Everything: Wave One and The Search for Everything: Wave Two.

== Band members ==
- John Mayer – lead vocals, guitar (2005–present)
- Pino Palladino – bass, occasional backing vocals (2005–present)
- Steve Jordan – drums, backing vocals (2005–present)

== Discography ==
=== Live albums ===
Title	Album details	Peak chart positions	Certifications
Title	Album details	US	Certifications
Try!	Released: November 22, 2005; Label: Columbia; Formats: CD, LP, digital download	34	RIAA: Gold

=== Video albums ===
Title	Details
Where the Light Is: John Mayer Live in Los Angeles	Released: July 1, 2008; Label: Columbia; Format: digital download, DVD

=== Singles ===
Title	Year	Peak chart positions
Title	Year	US
"Who Did You Think I Was"	2005	92

== Awards and nominations ==
Year	Awardee	Category	Result
2007	Try!	Best Rock Album	Nominated
2009	Where the Light Is: John Mayer Live in Los Angeles	Best Long Form Music Video	Nominated
