= Something's Missing =

Something's Missing may refer to:

== Music ==
- Something's Missing (In My Life) composed by Paul Jabara and Jay Asher, and recorded by various artists.
  - "Something's Missing" Paul Jabara duet with Donna Summer from Keeping Time
- "Something's Missing", song by John Mayer from Heavier Things and As/Is
- Something's Missing (Sheppard song) 2014
- "Something's Missing", a single by Five Stairsteps and Cubie, written by Clarence Burke, Jr. Clarence Burke, Snr. 1967
- "Something's Missing", a song by Bloodstone Love 1975
- "Something's Missing", a single by The Chords [UK 80s] Chris Pope Polydor UK 1980
