= Try! =

Live album by John Mayer Trio
- Released: November 22, 2005
- Recorded: September 21–22, 2005
- Venues: House of Blues (Chicago, Illinois)
- Genre: Blues rock
- Length: 63:23
- Label: Columbia
- Producers: Steve Jordan; John Mayer

John Mayer Trio chronology
As/Is (2004)	Try! (2005)	Continuum (2006)

Singles from Try!
- 1. "Who Did You Think I Was" Released: September 13, 2005

Try! is the first live album by the John Mayer Trio. It was recorded at the House of Blues, Chicago, Illinois and released by Columbia Records on November 22, 2005. The album was nominated for Best Rock Album at the 49th Annual Grammy Awards. The artwork for the album was done by Seattle graphic design firm, Ames Bros.

== Production ==
The trio features John Mayer (guitar/lead vocals), Pino Palladino (bass), and Steve Jordan (drums/backup vocals). Unlike previous efforts by John Mayer, Try! focuses on popular blues renditions rather than adult-contemporary pop songs. The CD includes two cover songs, "Wait Until Tomorrow" by Jimi Hendrix, and "I Got a Woman" by Ray Charles; two songs from Mayer's previous album, Heavier Things, "Daughters" and "Something's Missing"; and also showcased two songs from Mayer's then-forthcoming album, Continuum, "Vultures" and "Gravity".

== Reception ==
Professional ratings
Review scores
Source	Rating
Allmusic	4.5/5 stars
Blender	3/5 stars
The Daily Vault	A
Entertainment Weekly	B−
The Rolling Stone Album Guide	3/5 stars
The Village Voice	(favorable)

Critical response to the album was mixed, with most critics being impressed with Mayer's progression and Palladino and Jordan's musicianship, while still being underwhelmed. Christian Hoard of Rolling Stone said, "over most of these sixty-three minutes [of the album], Mayer proves he can bowl you over, not just make your knees weak", ultimately giving the album three out of five stars. Katy Hastey of Billboard found that "while "Try!" is brimming with talent, it's not consistently compelling." People magazine praised the album, concluding, "Here's hoping Mayer keeps this new groove going for his next solo disc."

== Track listing ==
No.	Title	Writer(s)	Length
1.	"Who Did You Think I Was"	John Mayer	3:09
2.	"Good Love Is on the Way"	Mayer, Steve Jordan, Pino Palladino	4:50
3.	"Wait Until Tomorrow" (The Jimi Hendrix Experience cover)	Jimi Hendrix	4:14
4.	"Gravity"	Mayer	5:49
5.	"Vultures"	Mayer, Jordan, Palladino	5:19
6.	"Out of My Mind"	Mayer	7:39
7.	"Another Kind of Green"	Mayer	4:39
8.	"I Got a Woman" (Ray Charles cover)	Ray Charles, Renald Richard	7:40
9.	"Something's Missing"	Mayer	6:56
10.	"Daughters"	Mayer	6:14
11.	"Try"	Mayer, Jordan, Palladino	6:52
Total length:			63:23

== Personnel ==
Musicians

- John Mayer – vocals, guitar, production, art direction, graphic design
- Steve Jordan – drums, backing vocals, production
- Pino Palladino – bass, backing vocals
- Chalmers Alford – guitar on track 11
- Székely Réka – wurlitzer piano on track 2

Additional *Chalmers Alford

- Ames Bros. – art direction, graphic design
- Danny Clinch – photography
- Michael Caulfield – photography

Production personnel

- John Alagia – additional production
- Roger Moutenot – Pro Tools engineering
- Chris Nelson – additional engineering
- Hardi Kamsani – additional engineering
- Joel Singer – additional engineering
- Peter Gary – additional engineering
- Joe Ferla – mixing, recording on tracks 3 and 10
- Chad Franscoviak – recording on all tracks except 3 and 10
- Greg Calbi – mastering

== Certifications ==
Region	Certification	Certified units/sales
United States (RIAA)	Gold	500,000^{‡}
^{‡} Sales+streaming figures based on certification alone.
