= The Search for Everything World Tour =

2017 concert tour by John Mayer

- Tour by John Mayer
- Promotional poster for the tour
- Associated album: The Search for Everything
- Start date: March 31, 2017
- End date: October 29, 2017
- Legs: 4
- No. of shows: 62

John Mayer concert chronology
- Born and Raised World Tour (2013–14); The Search for Everything World Tour (2017); I Guess I Just Feel Like World Tour (2019)

The Search for Everything World Tour was a concert tour by American recording artist John Mayer in support of his seventh studio album The Search for Everything (2017). The tour played 62 shows and visited the Americas as well as Europe, beginning on March 31, 2017 in Albany, United States, and concluding on October 29, 2017 in Buenos Aires, Argentina.

== Background ==
All tickets went on sale February 3, 2017, and began on March 31, 2017, and will finish on May 12, 2017. All tickets of the first leg North America shows include a free CD copy of the new album. The second leg of tour dates were announced on February 24, 2017 running July 18-September 3, 2017. with tickets going on sale March 4, 2017.

== Opening acts ==
- The Record Company (North America—Leg 1, select dates)
- LANY (North America—Leg 1, select dates)
- Andreas Moe (Europe)
- The Night Game (North America—Leg 2, select dates)
- Dawes (North America—Leg 2, select dates)
- Rodrigo y Gabriela (South America)

== Setlist ==
The following setlist was obtained from the concert held on April 12, 2017, at the Schottenstein center in Columbus, Ohio. It does not represent all concerts for the duration of the tour.

1. "Belief"
2. "Why Georgia"
3. "Queen of California"
4. "Slow Dancing in a Burning Room"
5. "Love on the Weekend"
6. "In Your Atmosphere (LA Song)"
7. "Comfortable"
8. "Free Fallin'"
9. "Your Body is a Wonderland"
10. "Cross Road Blues"
11. "Ain't No Sunshine"
12. "Bold as Love"
13. "Helpless"
14. "Moving On and Getting Over"
15. "If I Ever Get Around to Living"
16. "Still Feel Like Your Man"
17. "Dear Marie"
18. "Roll It on Home"
19. "In Repair"
20. "You're Gonna Live Forever in Me"

== Tour dates and box office score data ==
Date	City	Country	Venue	Tickets sold / available	Gross revenue	Opening Act
North America
March 31, 2017	Albany	United States	Times Union Center	10,165 / 12,587 (81%)	$617,897	The Record Company
April 1, 2017	Montreal	Canada	Bell Centre	11,702 / 13,168 (89%)	$743,748	The Record Company
April 3, 2017	Toronto	Canada	Air Canada Centre	14,790 / 14,790 (100%)	$1,092,790	The Record Company
April 5, 2017	New York City	United States	Madison Square Garden	14,793 / 14,793 (100%)	$1,413,563	The Record Company
April 6, 2017	Washington, D.C.	United States	Verizon Center	11,600 / 11,600 (100%)	$1,041,800	The Record Company
April 7, 2017	Philadelphia	United States	Wells Fargo Center	14,526 / 14,840 (98%)	$975,201	The Record Company
April 9, 2017	Boston	United States	TD Garden	13,454 / 13,763 (98%)	$968,536	The Record Company
April 11, 2017	Chicago	United States	United Center	13,530 / 13,807 (98%)	$1,039,809	The Record Company
April 12, 2017	Columbus	United States	Value City Arena	11,572 / 13,289 (87%)	$740,532	LANY
April 14, 2017	Kansas City	United States	Sprint Center	13,806 / 13,930 (99%)	$813,850	LANY
April 15, 2017	Saint Paul	United States	Xcel Energy Center	12,334 / 14,519 (85%)	$877,374	LANY
April 17, 2017	Edmonton	Canada	Rogers Place	8,676 / 11,651 (74%)	$583,674	LANY
April 19, 2017	Vancouver	Canada	Rogers Arena	10,790 / 12,534 (86%)	$788,828	LANY
April 21, 2017	Inglewood	United States	The Forum	13,693 /13,693 (100%)	$1,209,220	LANY
April 22, 2017	Las Vegas	United States	T-Mobile Arena	11,780 / 15,301 (77%)	$1,108,429	LANY
Europe
May 2, 2017	Amsterdam	Netherlands	Ziggo Dome	33,176 / 33,176 (100%)	$1,793,553	Andreas Moe
May 3, 2017	Amsterdam	Netherlands	Ziggo Dome	33,176 / 33,176 (100%)	$1,793,553	Andreas Moe
May 5, 2017	Herning	Denmark	Jyske Bank Boxen	13,399 / 15,207 (88%)	$1,078,600	Andreas Moe
May 7, 2017	Stockholm	Sweden	Ericsson Globe	12,306 / 12,726 (97%)	$919,463	Andreas Moe
May 8, 2017	Oslo	Norway	Oslo Spektrum	7,725 / 7,725 (100%)	$601,991	Andreas Moe
May 9, 2017	Copenhagen	Denmark	Royal Arena	15,641 / 15,641 (100%)	$1,255,140	Andreas Moe
May 11, 2017	London	England	The O_{2} Arena	30,709 / 30,709 (100%)	$1,739,780	Andreas Moe
May 12, 2017	London	England	The O_{2} Arena	30,709 / 30,709 (100%)	$1,739,780	Andreas Moe
North America
July 18, 2017	Albuquerque	United States	Isleta Amphitheater	7,702 / 15,051 (51%)	$394,803	The Night Game
July 19, 2017	Denver	United States	Pepsi Center	10,288 / 14,361 (72%)	$908,976	The Night Game
July 21, 2017	George	United States	The Gorge Amphitheatre	16,753 / 22,000 (76%)	$812,861	The Night Game
July 22, 2017	Portland	United States	Moda Center	8,792 / 12,065 (73%)	$771,310	The Night Game
July 24, 2017^{[A]}	Paso Robles	United States	Chumash Grandstand Arena	N/A	N/A	The Night Game
July 25, 2017	Anaheim	United States	Honda Center	9,686 / 13,113 (74%)	$968,593	The Night Game
July 27, 2017	Sacramento	United States	Golden 1 Center	9,683 / 11,611 (83%)	$829,569	The Night Game
July 29, 2017	Mountain View	United States	Shoreline Amphitheatre	18,449 / 22,000 (84%)	$1,154,199	The Night Game
July 30, 2017	Inglewood	United States	The Forum	12,346 /13,333 (93%)	$1,126,358	The Night Game
August 1, 2017	Phoenix	United States	Talking Stick Resort Arena	10,417 / 13,144 (79%)	$773,437	The Night Game
August 3, 2017	San Antonio	United States	AT&T Center	10,556 / 13,119 (80%)	$899,533	The Night Game
August 5, 2017	Dallas	United States	American Airlines Center	13,835 / 13,835 (100%)	$1,407,267	The Night Game
August 6, 2017	The Woodlands	United States	Cynthia Woods Mitchell Pavilion	16,047 / 16,047 (100%)	$992,511	The Night Game
August 8, 2017	Nashville	United States	Bridgestone Arena	15,733 / 15,733 (100%)	$1,267,357	The Night Game
August 9, 2017	New Orleans	United States	Smoothie King Center	9,046 / 11,915 (76%)	$806,449	The Night Game
August 10, 2017	Atlanta	United States	Lakewood Amphitheatre	18,820 / 18,820 (100%)	$1,130,469	The Night Game
August 12, 2017	Sunrise	United States	BB&T Center	11,353 / 12,147 (93%)	$1,123,010	The Night Game
August 13, 2017	Tampa	United States	Amalie Arena	11,018 / 11,806 (93%)	$1,054,256	The Night Game
August 15, 2017	Charlotte	United States	PNC Music Pavilion	15,765 / 18,744 (84%)	$836,555	The Night Game
August 16, 2017	Raleigh	United States	Coastal Credit Union Music Park	12,904 / 19,980 (65%)	$624,606	The Night Game
August 18, 2017	Camden	United States	BB&T Pavilion	13,440 / 24,426 (55%)	$687,227	
August 19, 2017	Holmdel Township	United States	PNC Bank Arts Center	16,937 / 16,937 (100%)	$1,028,816	
August 20, 2017	Hartford	United States	Xfinity Theatre	17,246 / 23,994 (72%)	$910,258	
August 22, 2017	Geddes	United States	Lakeview Amphitheater	10,644 / 19,567 (54%)	$521,842	
August 23, 2017	Wantagh	United States	Northwell Health at Jones Beach Theater	13,891 / 13,891 (100%)	$1,157,747	
August 25, 2017	Bristow	United States	Jiffy Lube Live	13,781 / 22,583 (61%)	$682,067	
August 26, 2017	Cincinnati	United States	Riverbend Music Center	13,326 / 20,265 (66%)	$764,662	
August 27, 2017	Darien	United States	Darien Lake Performing Arts Center	8,983 / 21,629 (41%)	$441,849	
August 29, 2017	Toronto	Canada	Budweiser Stage	15,876 / 15,876 (100%)	$871,288	
August 30, 2017	Cuyahoga Falls	United States	Blossom Music Center	10,335 / 20,555 (50%)	$522,069	
September 1, 2017	Clarkston	United States	DTE Energy Music Theatre	14,827 / 14,827 (100%)	$888,484	
September 2, 2017	Tinley Park	United States	Hollywood Casino Amphitheatre	15,438 / 28,188 (55%)	$823,186	
September 3, 2017	Noblesville	United States	Klipsch Music Center	21,642 / 24,483 (88%)	$989,731	
South America
October 18, 2017	São Paulo	Brazil	Allianz Parque	32,393 / 38,000 (85%)	$2,754,980	
October 20, 2017	Belo Horizonte	Brazil	Esplanada do Mineirão	11,253 / 15,000 (75%)	$740,852	
October 22, 2017	Curitiba	Brazil	Pedreira Paulo Leminski	11,417 / 15,000 (76%)	$1,118,870	
October 24, 2017	Porto Alegre	Brazil	Anfiteatro Beira Rio	13,080 / 15,000 (87%)	$1,075,680	
October 27, 2017	Rio de Janeiro	Brazil	Jeunesse Arena	12,477 / 12,477 (100%)	$1,050,810	
October 29, 2017	Buenos Aires	Argentina	Hipódromo Argentino de Palermo	11,180 / 11,180 (100%)	$996,476	
TOTAL				817,526 / 982,151` (83%)	$57,312,791	

Festivals and other miscellaneous performances
^{A} This concert was a part of the "California Mid-State Fair"

== Personnel ==
- Steve Jordan – drums
- John Mayer – vocals, guitars
- Pino Palladino – bass
- Larry Goldings – keyboards
- David Ryan Harris – guitar
- Tiffany Palmer – vocals
- Carlos Ricketts – vocals
- Isaiah Sharkey – guitar
