= As/Is =

2004 live album by John Mayer

- As/Is Volume Six Cover

Live album by John Mayer
- Released: October 19, 2004
- Recorded: July 16 – August 14, 2004
- Genres: Pop rock, blues rock
- Length: 96:17
- Labels: Columbia (Cat: C2K 93542); Aware
- Producers: Chad Franscoviak; John Mayer

John Mayer chronology
Heavier Things (2003)	As/Is (2004)	Try! (2005)

Professional ratings
Review scores
Source	Rating
The Rolling Stone Album Guide	2.5/5 stars

As/Is is a live album by John Mayer, released October 19, 2004, available for download from iTunes and also available as a double-CD release. The albums were released from live concert performances across the United States from the tour following the release of Mayer's second album, Heavier Things. The recordings include five albums-worth of material as sold on iTunes. As of July 2009, the four concert-specific albums were still available on iTunes in the United States, though Volume One is no longer available; Each album has its own artwork. A two-disc compilation was released physically and digitally which features the "best" of the iTunes series, plus an additional song, "Inner City Blues (Make Me Wanna Holler)", a Marvin Gaye cover. In "Inner City Blues", Mayer called upon DJ Logic, the support act of the Heavier Things tour, to join him to perform a turntable solo.

== Performing band ==
The songs all feature Mayer's touring band of the time:

- John Mayer – guitar and vocals
- David LaBruyere – bass guitar
- David Ryan Harris – guitar and backing vocals
- JJ Johnson – drums and percussion
- Michael Chaves – guitar & vocals
- Eric Jacobson – trumpet and dented flugelhorn
- Chris Karlic – saxophone and flute
- Kevin Lovejoy – keyboards

== Cover art for the series ==
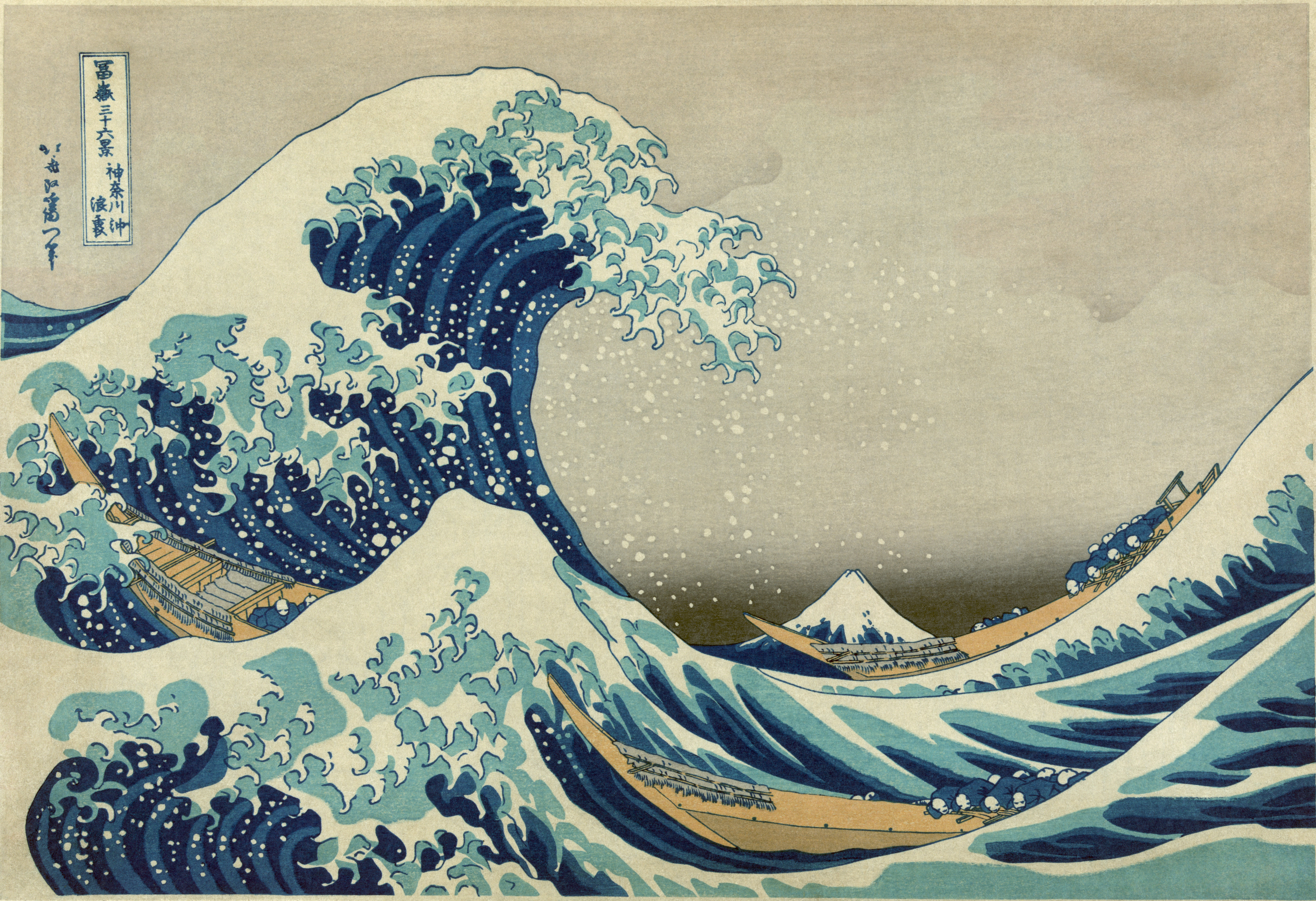
The Great Wave off Kanagawa is the basis of the CD cover.

Volume one features a cut-out silhouette version of Mayer (from the cover of Heavier Things) with two tones of blue. As it is separate from the other volumes, its artwork is rather distinct from the rest.

Artwork for the covers of volumes two, three, four, and five is by the artist Kozyndan. They feature bunnies in out-of-character situations on their covers, including hanging from helium balloons (two) and in washing machines (three). The bunnies on the cover of four begin as amoeba and diagonally evolve into bunnies. The cover of volume five has several bunnies with their midsections replaced with springs.

The CD release continued the use of bunnies, using the artwork 'Uprisings' by Kozyndan, which has hundreds of bunnies in formation to appear like revered Japanese artwork The Great Wave off Kanagawa. The artwork was originally created as a cover for issue 28 of the magazine Giant Robot. Notably, the CD is considered volume six (the last) of the series, and The Great Wave woodblock printing is the first of a 36-part series of art.

== Track listings ==
=== As/Is iTunes EP ===
Volume one

Released:
December 1, 2003
1. "Come Back to Bed"
2. "Your Body Is a Wonderland"
3. "Neon"
4. "St. Patrick's Day"
5. "83"
6. "Bigger than My Body"

=== As/Is iTunes concert releases ===
Volume two
Volume three
Volume four
Volume five
Mountain View
California
The Woodlands
Texas
Cleveland
Ohio
Cincinnati
Ohio
Philadelphia
Pennsylvania
Hartford
Connecticut
Shoreline Amphitheatre
C.W. Mitchell Pavilion
Blossom Music Center
Riverbend Music Center
Tweeter Center
Meadows Music Theatre

Recorded:
July 16, 2004
Released:
August 10, 2004

Recorded:
July 24, 2004
Released:
August 17, 2004

Recorded:
August 3–4, 2004
Released:
August 24, 2004

Recorded:
August 14–15, 2004
Released:
August 31, 2004
1. "No Such Thing"
2. "Come Back to Bed"
3. "Something's Missing
4. "Split Screen Sadness"
5. "New Deep"
6. "Why Georgia"
7. "Bigger than My Body"
8. "Home Life"
9. "Tracing"
10. "Comfortable"
1. "Clarity"
2. "No Such Thing"
3. "Back to You"
4. "Daughters"
5. "Blues Intro"
6. "Come Back to Bed"
7. "Your Body Is a Wonderland"
8. "Bigger than My Body"
9. "Comfortable"
10. "Neon"
1. "Only Heart"
2. "New Deep"
3. "No Such Thing"
4. "Something's Missing"
5. "My Stupid Mouth"
6. "Daughters"
7. "Clarity"
8. "Quiet"
9. "3x5"
10. "Wheel"
1. "Your Body Is a Wonderland"
2. "Only Heart"
3. "Something's Missing"
4. "New Deep"
5. "Daughters"
6. "My Stupid Mouth"
7. "Covered in Rain"
8. "Come Back to Bed"
9. "83"
10. "Hummingbird"

=== As/Is CD release ===
Volume Six

#	Title	Composer(s)	Date	Venue
Disc one
1.	"Only Heart"	John Mayer	August 3, 2004	Blossom Music Center
2.	"My Stupid Mouth"	Mayer	August 14, 2004	Tweeter Center
3.	"No Such Thing"	Mayer; Clay Cook	July 24, 2004	C.W. Mitchell Pavilion
4.	"Covered in Rain"	Mayer	August 14, 2004	Tweeter Center
5.	"Split Screen Sadness"	Mayer	July 16, 2004	Shoreline Amphitheater
6.	"Blues Intro"	Mayer	July 24, 2004	C.W. Mitchell Pavilion
7.	"Come Back to Bed"	Mayer	July 24, 2004	C.W. Mitchell Pavilion
Disc two
1.	"Your Body Is a Wonderland"	Mayer	July 24, 2004	C.W. Mitchell Pavilion
2.	"Something's Missing"	Mayer	August 4, 2004	Riverbend Music Center
3.	"Inner City Blues (Make Me Wanna Holler)"; Featuring DJ Logic	Marvin Gaye; James Nyx	July 27, 2004	Sandstone Amphitheater, Bonner Springs, Kansas
4.	"Clarity"	Mayer	August 3, 2004	Blossom Music Center
5.	"3x5"	Mayer	August 3, 2004	Blossom Music Center
6.	"Home Life"	Mayer; David LaBruyere	July 16, 2004	Shoreline Amphitheater
7.	"Comfortable"	Mayer; Cook	July 24, 2004	C.W. Mitchell Pavilion
8.	"Neon"	Mayer; Cook	July 24, 2004	C.W. Mitchell Pavilion
