= In the Blood (John Mayer song) =

Single by John Mayer

from the album The Search for Everything
- Released: May 1, 2017
- Recorded: 2017
- Genre: Country pop
- Length: 4:04 (album version); 3:58 (radio edit)
- Label: Columbia; Arista Nashville
- Songwriter: John Mayer
- Producers: John Mayer; Chad Franscoviak; Steve Jordan

John Mayer singles chronology
"Still Feel Like Your Man" (2017)	"In the Blood" (2017)	"New Light" (2018)

Audio video
- "John Mayer - In the Blood (Official Audio)" on YouTube

"In the Blood" is a song written and recorded by American singer-songwriter John Mayer. The song was released on May 1, 2017 as the third single from Mayer's seventh studio album The Search for Everything, following "Love on the Weekend" and "Still Feel Like Your Man". It is Mayer's first song officially released to country radio.

== Lyrics ==
The song mentions Mayer's family influence. In his interview with NPR, Mayer said, "It's turning around and pointing at yourself and going 'What's in there?' It's a certain time in your life where you just want to turn yourself upside down and shake everything out and go."

== Personnel ==
- John Mayer – vocals, guitar
- Steve Jordan – drums, percussion
- Pino Palladino – bass
- Larry Goldings - keys
- Greg Leisz - lap steel
- Sheryl Crow - vocals

Production

- John Mayer – producer
- Chad Franscoviak – producer, recording engineer
- Steve Jordan - executive producer
- Martin Pradler – digital editor
- Manny Marroquin – mixing engineer
- Chris Galland – mixing engineer
- Jeff Jackson – assistant engineer
- Robin Florent – assistant engineer
- Greg Calbi – mastering engineer

== Themes ==
The song explores the relationship dynamics in his family and how that may have impacted the way he loves. Scott Conklin with Medium says of the song "that Mayer is wondering if the reason he is the way he is is because its something innate in his family. It’s heavy stuff." Gabrielle Ginsberg of Hollywood Life found the record "relatable for anyone who feels like there’s too much of their parents’ personalities in them (and not in a good way)." Mayer has said it's the song that makes him feel the most on the album, and while hesitant to explain it, saying, "If I was gonna go that honest on a song, I wasn't gonna necessarily be a liability to it and color it in," he also said, "When I listened to that back, it was like an anthem for me, about me...[during] a certain time in your life where you just want to turn yourself upside down and shake everything out and go, 'Where's the loose change? What is in here?'"

== Critical response ==
Entertainment Weekly said the song was "perhaps the first ballad to explore nature versus nurture."

== Commercial performance ==
The song became Mayer's first entry on the Billboard country charts. It debuted at number 59 on Billboard Country Airplay and reached a peak position of number 57 the following week. It peaked at number 39 on Billboard Hot Country Songs.

== Charts ==
=== Weekly charts ===
Chart (2017)	Peak position
US Country Airplay (Billboard)	57
US Hot Country Songs (Billboard)	39
US Hot Rock & Alternative Songs (Billboard)	13

=== Year-end charts ===
Chart (2017)	Position
US Hot Rock Songs (Billboard)	66

== Cover version ==
The song was covered by American a cappella group Home Free. The music video of the cover version was released on August 30, 2017.

== Certifications ==
Region	Certification	Certified units/sales
Denmark (IFPI Danmark)	Gold	45,000^{‡}
United States (RIAA)	Gold	500,000^{‡}
^{‡} Sales+streaming figures based on certification alone.
