= Who Did You Think I Was =

Single by John Mayer Trio

from the album Try!
- B-side: "Come When I Call"
- Released: 2005
- Recorded: 2005
- Genre: Blues rock; funk rock; R&B
- Label: Aware, Columbia
- Songwriter: John Mayer
- Producers: John Mayer, Steve Jordan

John Mayer Trio singles chronology
| "Who Did You Think I Was" (2005) | "Live @ Yahoo! Music" (2005) |

"Who Did You Think I Was" is the debut single by blues-rock group John Mayer Trio from their first and only album, Try!. As it is from a live album, the single itself is a live recording. Speculation that Mayer was moving away from his known field of sensitive acoustic pop rock into blues was confirmed by the release of this single, being that it's a moderately heavy blues-rock song. Furthermore, the line from the first verse, "Got a brand new blues that I can't explain", indicates Mayer exploring blues unlike before.

The song also appeared as the B-side on the Trio's subsequent EP, "Live @ Yahoo! Music", after the track, "Out of My Mind", a heavily blues-influenced song written by Mayer which also appears on Try!.

The B-side to "Who Did You Think I Was" is "Come When I Call", which did not appear on the album Try!, but was frequently played throughout the trio live performances, like the song, "I Don't Need No Doctor".

== Music video ==
Despite the single for "Who Did You Think I Was" being the version from the trio's live album, the music video of the song was a studio recording specifically for the purpose of the video itself. The music video features the trio in a worn-down factory or warehouse playing the song. In certain shots, the cameras are intentionally clearly visible to make the video have a "put-together" feel.

The guitar Mayer plays in the video is a Fender Custom Shop Monterey Stratocaster, which is based upon a guitar that Jimi Hendrix played and subsequently burned at the Monterey Pop Festival in 1967. The guitar is part of the limited run on 210 instruments made by Custom Shop in 1997, all hand-painted and signed by Pamelina H.
