= The Complete 2012 Performances Collection =

EP by John Mayer
- Released: August 7, 2012
- Genre: Blues rock
- Length: 16:30
- Label: Columbia
- Producers: John Mayer, Don Was

John Mayer chronology
Born and Raised (2012)	The Complete 2012 Performances Collection (2012)	Paradise Valley (2013)

The Complete 2012 Performances Collection is an extended play (EP) by the American blues rock musician John Mayer. Released on August 7, 2012, as an iTunes-exclusive digital download, the EP contains four acoustic versions of tracks from Mayer's album Born and Raised, as well as a previously unreleased track from the album's recording sessions.

== Track listing ==
All tracks are written by John Mayer.

No.	Title	Length
1.	"Something Like Olivia" (acoustic version)	3:03
2.	"Queen of California" (acoustic version)	3:40
3.	"Speak for Me" (acoustic version)	3:05
4.	"Shadow Days" (acoustic version)	3:48
5.	"Go Easy on Me"	2:54
Total length:		16:30
