= The Search for Everything: Wave One =

EP by John Mayer
- Released: January 20, 2017
- Recorded: August 2014–September 2016
- Genre: Blues; pop; rock; soul
- Length: 14:37
- Label: Columbia
- Producer: John Mayer; Chad Franscoviak

John Mayer chronology
Paradise Valley (2013)	The Search for Everything: Wave One (2017)	The Search for Everything: Wave Two (2017)

Singles from The Search for Everything: Wave One
- 1. "Love on the Weekend" Released: November 17, 2016

The Search for Everything: Wave One is an extended play (EP) by American singer-songwriter John Mayer, released on January 20, 2017 by Columbia Records. It contains the first four tracks from his seventh studio album The Search for Everything, and was followed by The Search for Everything: Wave Two on February 24, 2017.

== Background ==
The Search for Everything: Wave One is the first release from John Mayer since his 2013 Americana album Paradise Valley, after a four-year hiatus. Throughout 2015 and 2016, he toured as part of the rock band Dead & Company, with the remaining members of the classic rock group The Grateful Dead. In January 2017, John Mayer wrote in a Facebook post that "The album will be released four songs at a time. There were too many songs to ever get out the door at once."

== Recording and composition ==
According to an excerpt from Rolling Stone, "My starting point is, 'I want to leave the Earth as a writer,'" he explains. "I wasn't interested in doing anything I've done before, and I wanted to stoke the fire of abstraction and just start punching hard." Speaking about the rollout of EPs in support of his seventh album, he said "The price of admission is four songs. If you don't like these, don't get the next four. But if I've engendered some kind of trust that you think I'm onto something, get the next four, and come along with me on every single wave."

On writing the single "Love on the Weekend", Mayer said "Writing 'Love On The Weekend' was the experience of all the best songs I've ever written, when you're going to go home and obsess all night because you know you're onto something and you know it's only going to get better when you go back and work on it the next day."

== Release and promotion ==
John Mayer debuted the lead single "Love on the Weekend" through Facebook Live on November 17, 2016, where it was released for digital download thereafter.

"Love on the Weekend" was performed on The Tonight Show Starring Jimmy Fallon on December 6, 2016, with Maroon 5's James Valentine, and Steve Jordan, and Pino Palladino as part of Mayer's backing band.

"Moving On and Getting Over" was performed on The Ellen Degeneres Show on February 24, 2017.

== Commercial performance ==
The Search for Everything: Wave One debuted at number two on the US Billboard 200, earning 49,000 album-equivalent units for the week ending February 11, 2017. It was the best-selling album of the week, selling 38,000 traditional albums in its first week. Wave One became Mayer's eighth top-ten album on the Billboard 200.

== Track listing ==
All tracks are written by John Mayer.

No.	Title	Length
1.	"Moving On and Getting Over"	4:21
2.	"Changing"	3:33
3.	"Love on the Weekend"	3:31
4.	"You're Gonna Live Forever in Me"	3:09
Total length:		14:34

== Personnel ==
=== Musicians ===
- John Mayer – vocals, guitars
- Steve Jordan – drums, percussion
- Pino Palladino – bass guitar
- James Fauntleroy – keyboards (on track 1)
- Larry Goldings – keyboards (on track 1), organ (on track 2)
- Greg Leisz – guitar (on track 2)
- Davide Rossi – strings (on track 4)

=== Production ===
- Steve Jordan – executive producer
- Chad Franscoviak – producer, engineering
- John Mayer – producer
- Chris Galland – mixing
- Manny Marroquin – mixing
- Greg Calbi – mastering

== Charts ==
=== Weekly charts ===
Chart (2017)	Peak position
Canadian Albums (Billboard)	2
Danish Albums (Hitlisten)	8
US Billboard 200	2
US Americana/Folk Albums (Billboard)	1
US Top Rock Albums (Billboard)	1

=== Year-end charts ===
Chart (2017)	Position
US Top Rock Albums (Billboard)	69
