= Daughters (John Mayer song) =

Single by John Mayer

from the album Heavier Things
- B-side: "Come Back to Bed", "Home Life"
- Released: September 2004
- Length: 3:59
- Label: Columbia; Aware
- Songwriter: John Mayer
- Producer: Jack Joseph Puig

John Mayer singles chronology
"Clarity" (2004)	"Daughters" (2004)	"Go!" (2005)

Music video
- "John Mayer - Daughters" on YouTube

"Daughters"
John Mayer's "Daughters" from Heavier Things

"Daughters" is the third single from Heavier Things, the 2003 studio album from blues rock singer-songwriter John Mayer. The critically acclaimed song won numerous awards, including the 2005 Grammy Award for Song of the Year at the 47th Grammy Awards. It has sold 1,007,000 copies in the US as of May 2013.

== Content ==
Lyrically, "Daughters" is an admonition to fathers (and to a lesser extent, mothers) to nurture their daughters in their childhood, because the relationship will affect their future relationships with men as adults. He uses his own troubled lover to illustrate his belief.

Mayer has at various times told different, and sometimes conflicting, stories as to the inspiration for the song, ranging from MTV's Real World (in a Sirius Morning Mash Up Show interview in May 2007) to an unnamed ex-girlfriend.

In 2010, on VH1's Storytellers, Mayer stated that he wrote the song about an ex-girlfriend who had trust issues because of her absent father, which led to the decline and eventual split of their relationship.

== Release controversy ==
Mayer had been resistant on releasing the song as a single, and was still skeptical despite the Grammy win, which he mentioned in his speech upon receiving the award. On several occasions, Mayer had pushed to release the songs "Come Back to Bed" and "Something's Missing" as singles, as they were more the kind of music he was leaning towards making. However, the label decided that "Daughters" would be more well received by radio.

In 2005, Mayer converted the song into an all-out blues song with his group John Mayer Trio on the live album, Try!, stripping away the acoustic elements the song had become known for, although not similar version to the "Electric Guitar Mix" of the song as included on the single's re-release.

== Music video ==
The music video is a black and white video of Mayer playing the guitar and singing the song in a dark studio, intercut between scenes of a girl (i.e., a "daughter"). The video clip, directed by Mario Sorrenti, features the Australian supermodel Gemma Ward.

== Track listings ==
All songs were written by Mayer unless otherwise noted.

Original release

1. "Daughters" – 3:59
2. "Come Back to Bed" – 11:56 (Live at the C.W. Mitchell Pavilion, July 24, 2004)
3. "Home Life" (David LaBruyere/Mayer) – 6:50 (Live at the Shoreline Amplitheaer, July 16, 2004)

"Come Back to Bed" and "Home Life" are the same live versions that appear on Mayer's as/is volumes released in 2004

Re-release

1. "Daughters" – 3:59
2. "Daughters" (Electric guitar mix) – 3:59
3. "Daughters" (Home demo) – 4:59

== Personnel ==
- John Mayer – vocals, guitar
- Lenny Castro – percussion
- Jamie Muhoberac – piano

== Charts ==
=== Weekly charts ===
Chart (2004–2005)	Peak position
Australia (ARIA)	53
Canada AC Top 30 (Radio & Records)	3
Canada Hot AC Top 30 (Radio & Records)	13
Netherlands (Single Top 100)	29
US Billboard Hot 100	19
US Adult Alternative Airplay (Billboard)	6
US Adult Contemporary (Billboard)	2
US Adult Pop Airplay (Billboard)	1
US Pop Airplay (Billboard)	19

=== Year-end charts ===
Chart (2004)	Position
US Adult Top 40 (Billboard)	32

Chart (2005)	Position
US Billboard Hot 100	83
US Adult Contemporary (Billboard)	4
US Adult Top 40 (Billboard)	14
US Mainstream Top 40 (Billboard)	68
US Triple-A (Billboard)	42

== Certifications ==
Region	Certification	Certified units/sales
Australia (ARIA)	Platinum	70,000^{‡}
Denmark (IFPI Danmark)	Gold	45,000^{‡}
New Zealand (RMNZ)	Platinum	30,000^{‡}
United States (RIAA)	2× Platinum	2,000,000^{‡}
^{‡} Sales+streaming figures based on certification alone.

== Release history ==
Region	Date	Format(s)	Label(s)	Ref.
United States	September 2004	Radio	Columbia; Aware	
Australia	March 14, 2005	CD	Columbia; Aware; Sony BMG	

== Cover versions ==
In 2005, trumpeter Rick Braun covered an instrumental version from album "Yours Truly."

== Appearances in media ==
"Daughters" was played at the end of the 7th Heaven episode "The Fine Art of Parenting". It was also in the first episode of The Secret Life of the American Teenager. Mayer performed the song himself in the 2015 buddy comedy film Get Hard.
