= Bigger than My Body =

2003 single by John Mayer

"Bigger Than My Body"

Single by John Mayer

from the album Heavier Things
- B-side: "Kid A"; "Tracing"
- Released: August 11, 2003
- Genre: Pop rock
- Length: 4:26
- Label: Aware; Columbia
- Songwriter: John Mayer
- Producer: Jack Joseph Puig

John Mayer singles chronology
| "Why Georgia" (2003) | "Bigger Than My Body" (2003) | "Clarity" (2004) |

Alternative cover

"Bigger Than My Body" is the first single released by American singer John Mayer from his second album, Heavier Things (2003). As a B-side, the single contained a cover of Radiohead's "Kid A" and an original song that was not included on Heavier Things, "Tracing". The intro to the song was generated using an Adrenalinn effects processor developed by Roger Linn. The single peaked at number 33 on the US Billboard Hot 100 as well as number one on the Billboard Triple-A chart.

== Lyrics ==
John Mayer composed the song after going to a Coldplay concert. He wrote it to explain his desire to write both moving and great music, like what he found in artists like Coldplay, Stevie Ray Vaughan and Pearl Jam.

== Critical reception ==
Chuck Taylor of Billboard called the tune "a pulsating midtempo pop/rocker ready to take center stage at mainstream and adult top 40."

== Other versions ==
"Bigger Than My Body" was performed live on tour following the release of Heavier Things. In that tour, Mayer had several concerts recorded, four of which were then sold online on iTunes as "As/Is". "Bigger Than My Body" appeared on two of these releases, the California performance at Mountain View and the Texas performance at The Woodlands (and runs for 6:17, almost two minutes longer than the album and single version). The concerts were then compiled into a "best of as/is" CD, but "Bigger Than My Body" didn't make the cut. On Mayer's former website, an acoustic version of "Bigger Than My Body" was available to listen to using its music player, but this version has never been made available otherwise.

When played on the radio, the bridge was shortened for radio friendliness, like the bridge in "Your Body Is a Wonderland". Also, some radio stations cut out the end of the song as well.

== Track listing ==
1. "Bigger Than My Body" (John Mayer) – 4:26
2. "Kid A" (Radiohead) – 2:52
3. "Tracing" (Mayer) – 3:18

== Personnel ==
- John Mayer – vocals, guitar
- David LaBruyere – bass
- Jamie Muhoberac – keyboards
- Lenny Castro – percussion
- Matt Chamberlain – drums
- Greg Leisz – lap steel guitar

== Charts ==
=== Weekly charts ===
| Chart (2003–2004) | Peak position |
|---|---|
| Australia (ARIA) | 38 |
| New Zealand (Recorded Music NZ) | 21 |
| Scottish Singles Sales (Official Charts) | 67 |
| UK Singles (Official Charts) | 72 |
| US Billboard Hot 100 | 33 |
| US Adult Alternative Airplay (Billboard) | 1 |
| US Adult Contemporary (Billboard) | 27 |
| US Adult Pop Airplay (Billboard) | 4 |
| US Pop Airplay (Billboard) | 22 |

=== Year-end charts ===
| Chart (2003) | Position |
|---|---|
| US Adult Top 40 (Billboard) | 28 |
| US Mainstream Top 40 (Billboard) | 90 |
| US Triple-A (Billboard) | 10 |

| Chart (2004) | Position |
|---|---|
| US Adult Top 40 (Billboard) | 52 |

== Release history ==
| Region | Date | Format(s) | Label(s) | Ref. |
|---|---|---|---|---|
| United States | August 11, 2003 | Radio | Columbia; Aware | |
| Australia | September 8, 2003 | CD | Columbia; Aware | |
| United Kingdom | February 16, 2004 | CD | Columbia; Aware | |
