= Who You Love =

2013 single by Katy Perry and John Mayer

Single by John Mayer featuring Katy Perry

from the album Paradise Valley
- Released: August 12, 2013
- Recorded: 2012–13
- Genre: Soft rock; country pop
- Length: 4:12
- Label: Columbia
- Songwriters: John Mayer; Katy Perry
- Producers: John Mayer; Don Was

John Mayer singles chronology
"Wildfire" (2013)	"Who You Love" (2013)	"XO" (2014)

Katy Perry singles chronology
"Roar" (2013)	"Who You Love" (2013)	"Unconditionally" (2013)

Music video
- "Who You Love" on YouTube

"Who You Love" is a song by John Mayer featuring Katy Perry, for Mayer's sixth studio album, Paradise Valley (2013). It appears as the sixth song on the album and is the third single from the record. Mayer co-wrote the song with Perry and co-produced with Don Was and released it as an Internet download on August 12, 2013. Lyrically, "Who You Love" is a ballad about accepting falling in love with someone, on the theory that "you love who you love". The song has been praised by critics and has received mostly positive reviews.

== Background and recording ==
Mayer has stated that his relationship with Perry has been a private and "human" one. On writing the song, Mayer said: "Who You Love" is a sweet melody that tells the story of opening your heart up and allowing yourself to fully love the person in your life—or specifically to "love who you love, who you love." "It was a really great experience and the song is one of these like old FM '70s and '80s sort of like duets, and I listened back to it; it's, like, really convincing. And I watched it get made and I'm still kind of taken aback." Mayer also stated in an interview with Billboard magazine that the general idea behind the song can be best described as, "I love you based on the fact that I've tried to run and I'm not running and I give up." In regards to Perry writing the lyrics to her part of the song herself he said that "it was a really fun opportunity for her to write like, her answer to that." During a speech at Oxford University, Mayer mentioned the song, saying "I wouldn't have brought [Perry] a song if I didn't think it was good and great and she wouldn't have said she would do it if she didn't think it was going to be great. So it was a completely artistic transaction." Perry described their duet as "incredible", adding: "I'm so proud of it because people hear it, and they hear a different side of me."

== Composition ==
"Who You Love" has a length of four minutes and twelve seconds (4:12). According to digital sheet music published at Musicnotes.com by Sony-ATV Music Publishing, the song is written in the key of A major and the tempo moves at moderate pace of 144 beats per minute. Mayer and Perry's vocal range in the song spans from the lower note of E_{3} to the higher note of D_{5}.

== Promotion ==
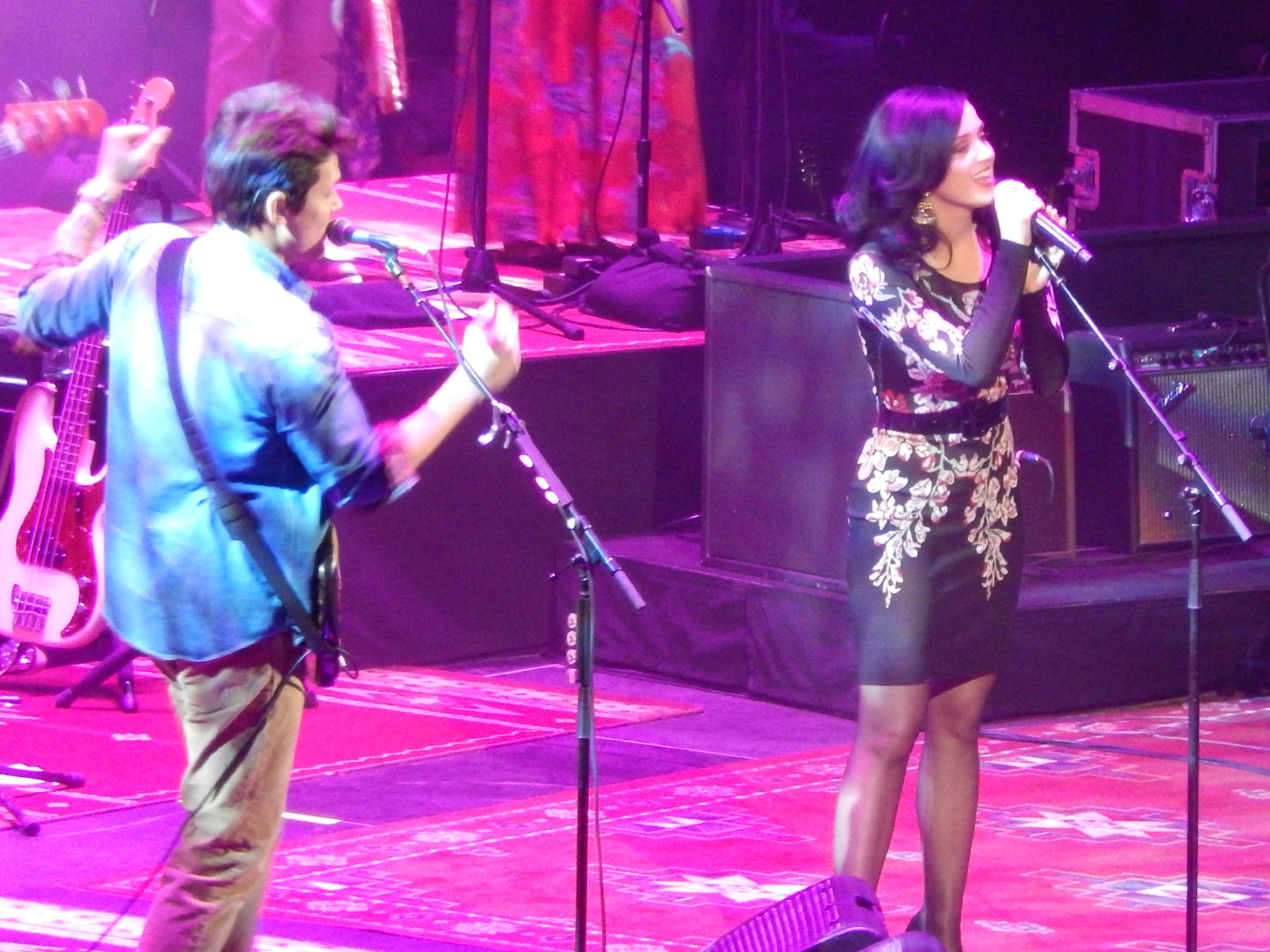
Mayer and Perry performing "Who You Love" at the Barclays Center on December 17, 2013

Mayer first announced that "Who You Love" would be the third single from Paradise Valley on his Tumblr account during a Q&A session with fans. The single cover was revealed on December 2, 2013, and features a photograph of Mayer and Perry shot by photographer Mario Sorrenti. The cover was revealed amongst a photo shoot of the couple shot by Sorrenti for Vanity Fair magazine. They performed the song together at Barclays Center in Brooklyn, New York on December 17, 2013, which was the last night of his Born and Raised World Tour.

== Critical reception ==
"Who You Love" received mostly positive reviews from music critics. Andrew Hampp of Billboard considered the song to be "the centrepiece" of Paradise Valley. Anthony Decurtis from Rolling Stone called "Who You Love" a "lovely duet". Randall Roberts of the Los Angeles Times said it has the feel of an "old soul classic", while the lyrics discuss "the joy of falling in love with someone when you least expect it." In a less positive review, Caroline Sulivan of The Guardian called it "a country-pop amble that's entirely self-serving" and said Perry's presence on the song is "drowsy" and "rootsy".

== Chart performance ==
Prior to being released as a single, "Who You Love" managed to chart in US and Canada. On the week ending December 21, the song debuted on the Billboard Hot 100 at number 80. On the week ending January 4, fuelled by a sudden surge in streaming due to the debut of its music video, the song reached its new peak of number 48 on Hot 100.

== Music video ==
On December 3, 2013, at the UNICEF Snowflake Ball in New York City, Perry confirmed that the video was recently filmed with director Sophie Muller. Perry described the video as "epic" and "beautiful". The video was released on December 17, 2013 on Good Morning America. The video features scenes of various real-life couples, including Mayer and Perry, riding a mechanical bull, as well as scenes of the couple singing together. Towards the end of the video, Mayer fires a confetti cannon whilst the couple ride the bull, and fireworks rain down behind them. During the video premiere on Good Morning America, Perry said the usage of the mechanical bull is a metaphor about love: "Relationships are kind of like riding a bull – you hold on for dear life. Sometimes you get a little buck here and there, but you get back on." On the video, Mayer said "We set the casting call up for real couples. It's just so authentic – they were having a great time. There's nothing scripted in that video except putting the bull in the middle of the desert."

== Credits and personnel ==
- John Mayer – vocals, guitars, keyboards, horn arrangements
- Katy Perry – vocals
- Sean Hurley – bass
- Aaron Sterling – drums
- Larry Williams – tenor sax, flute, horn arrangements
- Dan Higgins – tenor sax, flute
- Gary Grant – flugelhorn
- Bill Reichenbach – tenor trombone, bass trombone, EB alto horn

== Charts ==
=== Weekly charts ===
Chart (2013–2014)	Peak position
Australia (ARIA)	83
Canada Hot 100 (Billboard)	70
Japan Adult Contemporary Airplay (Billboard)	37
Lebanon (The Official Lebanese Top 20)	19
Netherlands (Dutch Tipparade 40)	18
US Billboard Hot 100	48
US Hot Rock & Alternative Songs (Billboard)	11
US Adult Pop Airplay (Billboard)	18

=== Year-end charts ===
Chart (2013)	Position
US Hot Rock Songs (Billboard)	73

Chart (2014)	Position
US Hot Rock Songs (Billboard)	53

== Certifications and sales ==
Region	Certification	Certified units/sales
Australia (ARIA)	Gold	35,000^{‡}
Denmark (IFPI Danmark)	Gold	45,000^{‡}
New Zealand (RMNZ)	Gold	15,000^{‡}
South Korea	—	2,131 (Note: South Korea sales figures as of January 4, 2014.)
United States (RIAA)	Gold	500,000^{‡}
^{‡} Sales+streaming figures based on certification alone.
