= Clarity (John Mayer song) =

2004 single by John Mayer

Single by John Mayer

from the album Heavier Things
- Released: January 12, 2004
- Length: 4:32
- Label: Aware; Columbia
- Songwriter: John Mayer
- Producer: Jack Joseph Puig

John Mayer singles chronology
"Bigger than My Body" (2003)	"Clarity" (2004)	"Daughters" (2004)

"Clarity" is a song written and recorded by American singer-songwriter John Mayer, arranged with piano, with drums provided in part by The Roots drummer Questlove, and brass by two-time Grammy winner Roy Hargrove. It was released as the second single from Mayer's second studio album, Heavier Things (2003), on January 12, 2004.

== Commercial performance ==
"Clarity" peaked at number one on the US Billboard Adult Alternative Songs chart and number 25 on the Billboard Bubbling Under Hot 100 chart.

== Music video ==
The music video for "Clarity" was directed by Director X. It was filmed on the Santa Monica Pier and the Pacific Coast Highway.

== Personnel ==
- John Mayer – vocals, guitar
- David LaBruyere – bass
- Jamie Muhoberac – keyboards
- Lenny Castro – percussion
- Matt Chamberlain – drums
- Questlove – drums
- Roy Hargrove – trumpet

== Charts ==
=== Weekly charts ===
Chart (2004–2005)	Peak position
Netherlands (Dutch Top 40 Tipparade)	17
Netherlands (Single Top 100)	80
New Zealand (Recorded Music NZ)	45
US Bubbling Under Hot 100 (Billboard)	25
US Adult Alternative Airplay (Billboard)	1
US Adult Pop Airplay (Billboard)	13

=== Year-end charts ===
Chart (2004)	Position
US Adult Top 40 (Billboard)	38
US Triple-A (Billboard)	9

== Cover version ==
This song was covered by saxophonist Najee for his album Rising Sun in 2007.
