= The Search for Everything: Wave Two =

EP by John Mayer
- Released: February 24, 2017
- Recorded: 2014–2016
- Studio: Capitol (Hollywood)
- Genre: R&B; blues; rock; pop
- Length: 14:49
- Label: Columbia; Sony Music
- Producer: John Mayer; Chad Franscoviak

John Mayer chronology
The Search for Everything: Wave One (2017)	The Search for Everything: Wave Two (2017)	The Search for Everything (2017)

Singles from The Search for Everything: Wave One
- 1. "Still Feel Like Your Man" Released: February 24, 2017

The Search for Everything: Wave Two (also shortened as Wave Two) is an extended play (EP) by American singer-songwriter John Mayer. Released on February 24, 2017 by Columbia and Sony Music, the EP contains four tracks from Mayer's seventh studio album, The Search for Everything, and is a follow-up to its predecessor EP, The Search for Everything: Wave One. It includes the lead single "Still Feel Like Your Man".

== Background ==
The Search for Everything: Wave Two is a follow-up to John Mayer's EP, The Search for Everything: Wave One, which are the first and second EPs published leading up to the release of his seventh studio album, The Search for Everything, which was released on April 14, 2017.

== Release ==
The EP was first announced by Mayer on his official Twitter account, revealing its track listing, album art cover, and release date. Prior to the release of The Search for Everything: Wave One, Mayer confirmed that he would release his seventh studio album across three four-song EPs.

On March 1, Mayer made a surprise guest appearance on Jimmy Kimmel Live!, and performed "Still Feel Like Your Man" with his full backing band for his promotional tour.

== Commercial performance ==
The Search for Everything: Wave Two debuted at number 13 on the US Billboard 200, earning 31,000 album-equivalent units for the week ending March 18, 2017. It was the seventh best-selling album of the week, selling 26,000 traditional albums in its first week. Wave One became Mayer's sixth number-one album on the Billboard Top Rock Albums.

== Track listing ==
All tracks are written by John Mayer.

No.	Title	Length
1.	"Still Feel Like Your Man"	3:56
2.	"Emoji of a Wave"	3:59
3.	"Helpless"	4:09
4.	"Roll It on Home"	3:25
Total length:		14:49

== Personnel ==
=== Musicians ===
- John Mayer – vocals, guitars
- Steve Jordan – drums, percussion
- Pino Palladino – bass guitar
- Larry Goldings – keyboards
- Aaron Sterling – drums (on “Roll It on Home”) and percussion (on “Still Feel Like Your Man” and “Roll It on Home”)
- James Fauntleroy – keyboards (on “Still Feel Like Your Man”)
- Al Jardine – backing vocals on “Emoji of a Wave”
- Matt Jardine – backing vocals on “Emoji of a Wave”

=== Production ===
- Steve Jordan – executive producer
- Chad Franscoviak – producer, engineering
- John Mayer – producer
- Chris Galland – mixing
- Manny Marroquin – mixing
- Greg Calbi – mastering

== Charts ==
Chart (2017)	Peak position
Canadian Albums (Billboard)	13
US Billboard 200	13
US Top Rock Albums (Billboard)	1
