= Paradise Valley (album) =

Studio album by John Mayer
- Released: August 20, 2013
- Recorded: 2012–13
- Studios: Electric Lady Studios (New York City, New York); The Village (Los Angeles, California); Berkeley Street Studio (Santa Monica, California); Ocean Way Recording (Hollywood, California)
- Genres: Folk rock; country rock; Southern rock; Americana
- Length: 40:05
- Label: Columbia
- Producers: John Mayer; Don Was

John Mayer chronology
| Born and Raised (2012) | Paradise Valley (2013) | The Search for Everything: Wave One (2017) |

Singles from Paradise Valley
- 1. "Paper Doll" Released: June 18, 2013; 2. "Wildfire" Released: July 16, 2013; 3. "Who You Love" Released: August 12, 2013

Paradise Valley is the sixth studio album by American singer-songwriter John Mayer, released on August 20, 2013, by Columbia Records. Musically, it is similar to his previous album Born and Raised (2012), but also features more musical breaks and instrumentals consisting of electric guitars rather than harmonica. Its title refers to Mayer's home along the Yellowstone River in Montana's Paradise Valley, where he has lived since 2012.

The album's first single "Paper Doll" was released on June 18, 2013, followed by "Wildfire" on July 16, 2013, which officially impacted Triple A radio on August 20, 2013. "Who You Love" was released as the third single, impacting Hot AC radio on September 3, 2013.

== Release and promotion ==
On August 19, 2013, Mayer went on the Late Show with David Letterman to promote the album by singing the second single from the release, "Wildfire". In addition, Mayer performed a concert in the Live on Letterman series the same night, which is a web stream event.

== Critical reception ==
Professional ratings
Aggregate scores
| Source | Rating |
|---|---|
| Metacritic | 73/100 |
Review scores
| Source | Rating |
| AllMusic | 3.5/5 stars |
| American Songwriter | 2.5/5 stars |
| The Gazette | 3.5/5 stars |
| The Guardian | 3/5 stars |
| Los Angeles Times | 3/4 stars |
| The Oakland Press | 3/4 stars |
| RedEye | 3/4 stars |
| Rolling Stone | 3.5/5 stars |
| USA Today | 3/4 stars |

Paradise Valley garnered generally positive reception from music critics. Metacritic, a review-aggregator site which assigns a weighted average score based on a number of selected ratings and reviews from mainstream music critics, gave the album 73 out of 100. Brian Mansfield of USA Today commented that the release "may have all the permanence of a summer camp fling". Anthony DeCurtis, writing for Rolling Stone, noted that this release "continues that autobiographical journey" noticeable in Mayer's previous offerings, and showcases Mayer "in a relaxed, joyful frame of mind... Mayer continues to blow down the road, this time carrying far less baggage and all the better for it." At The Oakland Press, Gary Graff noted that the album has an "anything-goes attitude", and felt Mayer had "turned in some of his most peaceful music yet." Matt Collar of Allmusic felt that the sound on the album "rings true." Los Angeles Times reviewer Randall Roberts wrote that "the musician is in charge here, and he keeps his peacocking in check", and that "The best part: When he does reveal his instrumental flair, he does so as someone whose natural-born skill warrants the display."

Glenn Gamboa of Newsday graded the album a B−, and felt that "Mayer may still be a little lost", yet also felt that the release signals that Mayer "may soon find his way." Writing for The Gazette, Mark LePage wrote that the album "is consolidation, soundly done", but felt that Mayer was "not advancing anything in the form", noting that "Paradise Valley is not without soul, but it never stings the way it could." Craig Manning at AbsolutePunk rated the album an 85-percent, and stated it to be "still a solid set of songs that follows one of today's best songwriters as he establishes a new comfort zone." At RedEye, Adam Lukach commented that Mayer's "soundscapes are sweetly arranged, and Mayer's voice, following his throat surgery, sounds as inviting as ever", but did note that this album "could benefit from a little more decisiveness." Melinda Newman of HitFix graded the album an A−, and wrote that the release "has an unrushed, pleasing, timeless feel to it that never sounds forced."

Caroline Sullivan from The Guardian wrote that Mayer may be "his own worst enemy". Writing for the New York Post, Michaelangelo Matos said that the fact that "Mayer had throat surgery before recording this album," and that "it's understandable if he's relaxing", "doesn't make the songs any less dippy." Matthew Horton of Virgin Media rated the album three-stars, and felt that "maybe we're right to be hesitant" about the album, and noted how stylistically "changes could be afoot with this sixth album." Daily News's Jim Farber rated the album three stars, and said that this release "proves more successful than Mayer's last effort at nailing the styles that inspired it."

== Chart performance ==
The album debuted at #2 on the Billboard 200 chart, with first-week sales of 145,560 copies in the United States. It is his first album since 2006's Continuum to not debut at #1.

== Track listing ==
All tracks are written by John Mayer, except where noted. All tracks are produced by Mayer and Don Was.

| No. | Title | Length |
|---|---|---|
| 1. | "Wildfire" | 4:15 |
| 2. | "Dear Marie" | 3:44 |
| 3. | "Waitin' On the Day" | 4:35 |
| 4. | "Paper Doll" | 4:19 |
| 5. | "Call Me the Breeze" (J. J. Cale cover) (writer: Cale) | 3:27 |
| 6. | "Who You Love" (featuring Katy Perry) (writers: Mayer, Perry) | 4:12 |
| 7. | "I Will Be Found (Lost at Sea)" | 4:03 |
| 8. | "Wildfire (Reprise)" (featuring Frank Ocean) (writer: Christopher Breaux) | 1:28 |
| 9. | "You're No One 'Til Someone Lets You Down" | 2:48 |
| 10. | "Badge and Gun" | 3:15 |
| 11. | "On the Way Home" | 3:59 |
| Total length: | | 40:05 |

== Personnel ==
=== Musicians ===
- John Mayer - Vocals, Guitars, Keyboards, Horn arrangements on track 6
- Aaron Sterling - Drums, Percussion
- Sean Hurley - Bass
- Chuck Leavell - Keyboards on tracks 2 to 5, 7, 9 to 11
- Paul Franklin - Pedal Steel Guitar on tracks 2, 9 & 11
- Zane Carney - Guitar on tracks 1 & 2
- Rami Jaffee - Keyboards on tracks 1 & 8
- Lisa Fischer - Background Vocals on tracks 7 & 11
- David Ryan Harris - Background Vocals on track 4
- Bernard Fowler - Background Vocals on track 7
- Frank Ocean - Wurlitzer, Vocals on track 8
- Katy Perry - Vocals on track 6
- Larry Williams - Tenor Saxophone, Flute, Horn arrangements on track 6
- Dan Higgins - Tenor Saxophone, Flute on track 6
- Gary Grant - Flugelhorn on track 6
- Bill Reichenbach Jr. - Tenor Trombone, Bass Trombone, E♭ Alto Horn on track 6

=== Production ===
- Michael McDonald - Executive Producer, Management
- Don Was, John Mayer - Producer
- Chad Franscoviak - Engineering
- Manny Marroquin - Mixing on tracks 1 to 6, 8 to 11
- Chris Galland - Mixing assistance on tracks 1 to 6, 8 to 11
- Delbert Bowers - Mixing assistance on tracks 1 to 6, 8 to 11
- Bob Ludwig - Mastering
- Patrick Spain - Recording (Additional recording assistance)
- Chris Owens, Jeff Gartenbaum - Recording (Assistance)
- Allen Ditto - Recording (Pedal Steel)
- Martin Pradler - Digital Editing
- Dave Bett, Jeri Heiden, SMOG Design, Inc. - Design
- Sam Jones - Photography
- Hiroki Nakamura - Stylist
- Reid Hunter, Serling, Rooks, Ferrara, McKoy And Worob, LLP - Legal
- Chris Gott - Production Manager
- Ken Helie - Production Coordinator
- Mick Management - Management
- Creative Artists Agency, Scott Clayton - Management Agency
- Cal Financial Group, Rit Venerus - Management Business

== Charts ==
=== Weekly charts ===
| Chart (2013) | Peak position |
|---|---|
| Australian Albums (ARIA) | 1 |
| Belgian Albums (Ultratop Flanders) | 17 |
| Belgian Albums (Ultratop Wallonia) | 44 |
| Canadian Albums (Billboard) | 1 |
| Dutch Albums (Album Top 100) | 1 |
| Finnish Albums (Suomen virallinen lista) | 8 |
| French Albums (SNEP) | 66 |
| Irish Albums (IRMA) | 7 |
| Italian Albums (FIMI) | 14 |
| Norwegian Albums (VG-lista) | 2 |
| Polish Albums (ZPAV) | 18 |
| Scottish Albums (Official Charts) | 5 |
| Spanish Albums (Promusicae) | 17 |
| Swedish Albums (Sverigetopplistan) | 9 |
| Swiss Albums (Schweizer Hitparade) | 4 |
| UK Albums (Official Charts) | 4 |
| US Billboard 200 | 2 |
| US Digital Albums (Billboard) | 1 |
| US Americana/Folk Albums (Billboard) | 1 |
| US Top Rock Albums (Billboard) | 1 |
| US Indie Store Album Sales (Billboard) | 1 |

| Chart (2025) | Peak position |
|---|---|
| Greek Albums (IFPI) | 18 |

=== Year-end charts ===
| Chart (2013) | Position |
|---|---|
| Dutch Albums (Album Top 100) | 24 |
| Swedish Albums (Sverigetopplistan) | 99 |
| US Billboard 200 | 96 |
| US Top Rock Albums (Billboard) | 23 |
| US Folk Albums (Billboard) | 5 |

| Chart (2014) | Position |
|---|---|
| US Top Rock Albums (Billboard) | 69 |
| US Folk Albums (Billboard) | 7 |

== Certifications ==
| Region | Certification | Certified units/sales |
|---|---|---|
| Australia (ARIA) | Gold | 35,000^{‡} |
| Canada (Music Canada) | Gold | 40,000^{‡} |
| Denmark (IFPI Danmark) | Platinum | 20,000^{‡} |
| United Kingdom (BPI) | Silver | 60,000^{‡} |
| United States (RIAA) | Gold | 500,000^{‡} |
^{‡} Sales+streaming figures based on certification alone.
