= The Search for Everything =

Studio album by John Mayer
- Released: April 14, 2017
- Recorded: 2014–2017
- Studio: Capitol (Hollywood)
- Genre: Blues; pop; soft rock
- Length: 43:49
- Label: Columbia
- Producer: John Mayer; Chad Franscoviak

John Mayer chronology
The Search for Everything: Wave Two (2017)	The Search for Everything (2017)	Sob Rock (2021)

Singles from The Search for Everything
- 1. "Love on the Weekend" Released: November 17, 2016; 2. "Still Feel Like Your Man" Released: February 24, 2017; 3. "In the Blood" Released: May 1, 2017

The Search for Everything is the seventh studio album by American singer-songwriter John Mayer, released on April 14, 2017, by Columbia Records. It is a loose concept album based on the emotions and thoughts of dealing with a break-up: opening with the initial break-up, and closing with the girl getting married.

== Promotion ==
=== Extended plays ===
The Search for Everything was preceded by the release of two EPs each featuring four new songs from the album. The album's lead single, "Love on the Weekend", was released on November 17, 2016. The first wave, The Search for Everything: Wave One, released on January 20, 2017. The second wave, The Search for Everything: Wave Two, was released on February 24, 2017.

=== Tour and live performances ===
On January 30, 2017, John Mayer announced his headlining arena tour, The Search for Everything World Tour, which took place in North America in 2017. On February 24, Mayer announced 30 more tour dates.

On December 6, 2016, Mayer performed the album's lead single "Love on the Weekend" on The Tonight Show Starring Jimmy Fallon. On February 24, Mayer performed "Moving On and Getting Over" on The Ellen DeGeneres Show. On February 28, he performed the single "Still Feel Like Your Man" on Jimmy Kimmel Live!.

Mayer announced in early 2019 that he will be taking The Search for Everything on tour again. Mayer announced seven Asian tour dates, nine European dates and 32 US dates spanning from March to October 2019.

== Critical reception ==
Professional ratings
Aggregate scores
Source	Rating
Metacritic	61/100
Review scores
Source	Rating
The A.V. Club	D
AllMusic	4.5/5 stars
Entertainment Focus	3/5
Entertainment Weekly	B+
Pitchfork	4.9/10
Robert Christgau	(2-star Honorable Mention)
Spectrum Culture	3.75/5

At Metacritic, which assigns a normalized rating out of 100 to reviews from mainstream critics, The Search for Everything has an average score of 61, which indicates "generally favorable reviews" based on 4 reviews.

Stephen Thomas Erlewine of AllMusic gave it 4.5 out of five stars, commenting "Although it's ostensibly a breakup album, The Search for Everything doesn't feel haunted: Mayer glides through the record so smoothly, the supple sound seems almost insouciant. It is also quite alluring. " Jim Farber of Entertainment Weekly called it "the most deeply personal album Mayer has ever released", giving it B+ while stating "if mellowness remains Mayer’s weakness, the brilliance of his best compositions provides a worthy trade-off". Robert Christgau gave this album a two-star honorable mention: "If you wonder why women fall for a guy with his romantic history, listen to his songs with an open mind", highlighting "Love on the Weekend" and "Never on the Day You Leave".

Alex McLevy of The A.V. Club gave the album a D, stating "John Mayer loses all trace of anything interesting". The 4.9 out of 10 review from Katherine St. Asaph of Pitchfork was also unfavorable, saying the album is "pleasantly bland".

== Commercial performance ==
The Search for Everything debuted at number two on the US Billboard 200 with 132,000 album-equivalent units, of which 120,000 were pure album sales, becoming Mayer's ninth top 10 album on the chart. It debuted at number one on the US Billboard Top Rock Albums, becoming the third number one album by Mayer in 2017 on this chart following the two EPs Wave One and Wave Two.

== Track listing ==
All tracks are written by John Mayer.

No.	Title	Length
1.	"Still Feel Like Your Man"	3:56
2.	"Emoji of a Wave"	3:59
3.	"Helpless"	4:09
4.	"Love on the Weekend"	3:31
5.	"In the Blood"	4:05
6.	"Changing"	3:33
7.	"Theme from "The Search for Everything""	1:54
8.	"Moving On and Getting Over"	4:21
9.	"Never on the Day You Leave"	3:44
10.	"Rosie"	4:03
11.	"Roll It on Home"	3:25
12.	"You're Gonna Live Forever in Me"	3:09
Total length:		43:49

== Personnel ==
=== Musicians ===
Adapted from album's liner notes.

- John Mayer – vocals, guitars, piano
- Steve Jordan – drums (tracks 1, 3–10), percussion (tracks 1–6, 8)
- Pino Palladino – bass guitar (tracks 1–11)
- Sheryl Crow – vocals (track 5)
- Mike Elizondo – bass (track 10)
- James Fauntleroy – additional keyboards (tracks 1, 8)
- Chuck Findley – trumpet (track 10)
- Larry Goldings – keyboards (tracks 1–3, 5, 8, 10, 11), pump organ (track 6)
- Gary Grant – trumpet (track 10)
- Jerry Hey – horn arrangements and conducting (track 10)
- Daniel Higgins – saxophone (track 10)
- Al Jardine – vocals (track 2)
- Matt Jardine – vocals (track 2)
- Greg Leisz – lap steel (track 5), dobro (track 6), pedal steel (track 11)
- Andy Martin – trombone (track 10)
- Tiffany Palmer – vocals (track 3)
- Davide Rossi – strings (tracks 1, 2, 7, 9, 12), string arrangements and conducting (tracks 2, 7, 12)
- Aaron Sterling – drums (track 11), percussion (tracks 1, 11)

=== Production ===
- Steve Jordan – executive producer
- Chad Franscoviak – producer, engineering
- John Mayer – producer
- Chris Galland – mixing
- Manny Marroquin – mixing
- Greg Calbi – mastering

== Charts ==
=== Weekly charts ===
Chart (2017)	Peak position
Australian Albums (ARIA)	5
Austrian Albums (Ö3 Austria)	46
Belgian Albums (Ultratop Flanders)	26
Belgian Albums (Ultratop Wallonia)	85
Canadian Albums (Billboard)	2
Czech Albums (ČNS IFPI)	45
Danish Albums (Hitlisten)	7
Dutch Albums (Album Top 100)	4
French Albums (SNEP)	152
German Albums (Offizielle Top 100)	44
Irish Albums (IRMA)	30
Italian Albums (FIMI)	50
New Zealand Albums (RMNZ)	10
Norwegian Albums (VG-lista)	16
Polish Albums (ZPAV)	41
Portuguese Albums (AFP)	23
Scottish Albums (OCC)	11
Slovak Albums (ČNS IFPI)	56
Spanish Albums (PROMUSICAE)	50
Swedish Albums (Sverigetopplistan)	7
Swiss Albums (Schweizer Hitparade)	16
UK Albums (OCC)	16
US Billboard 200	2
US Top Rock Albums (Billboard)	1

=== Year-end charts ===
Chart (2017)	Position
Danish Albums (Hitlisten)	67
Dutch Albums (Album Top 100)	23
US Billboard 200	137
US Top Rock Albums (Billboard)	17
Chart (2018)	Position
Dutch Albums (Album Top 100)	56
Chart (2019)	Position
Dutch Albums (Album Top 100)	82

== Certifications ==
Region	Certification	Certified units/sales
Australia (ARIA)	Gold	35,000^{‡}
Canada (Music Canada)	Platinum	80,000^{‡}
Denmark (IFPI Danmark)	Platinum	20,000^{‡}
United Kingdom (BPI)	Silver	60,000^{‡}
United States (RIAA)	Gold	500,000^{‡}
^{‡} Sales+streaming figures based on certification alone.
