= Love on the Weekend =

Single by John Mayer

from the album The Search for Everything
- Released: November 17, 2016
- Recorded: 2016
- Genre: Pop rock
- Length: 3:33
- Label: Columbia
- Songwriter: John Mayer
- Producers: Steve Jordan; Chad Franscoviak; John Mayer

John Mayer singles chronology
"XO" (2014)	"Love on the Weekend" (2016)	"Still Feel Like Your Man" (2017)

"Love on the Weekend" is the lead single from American musician John Mayer's seventh studio album The Search for Everything. The song premiered on November 17, 2016.

== Live performance ==
On December 6, 2016, Mayer performed the song on The Tonight Show Starring Jimmy Fallon.

== Reception ==
Rolling Stone's Brittany Spanos said the song is "a return to Mayer's pop-rock roots while retaining a bit of bluesy flair Mayer cultivated on his last several studio albums". Robert Christgau highlighted the song in his review of the album The Search for Everything.

== Personnel ==
- John Mayer – vocals, guitar, piano
- Steve Jordan – drums
- Pino Palladino – bass

Production

- Steve Jordan – executive producer
- Chad Franscoviak – executive producer, recording engineer
- Manny Marroquin – mixing engineer
- Chris Galland – mixing engineer
- Jeff Jackson – assistant engineer
- Robin Florent – assistant engineer
- Emerson Mancini – mastering engineer

== Charts ==
=== Weekly charts ===
Chart (2016–17)	Peak position
Australia (ARIA)	65
Canada Hot 100 (Billboard)	69
Netherlands (Single Top 100)	64
New Zealand Heatseekers (RMNZ)	6
US Billboard Hot 100	53
US Hot Rock & Alternative Songs (Billboard)	5
US Adult Alternative Airplay (Billboard)	3
US Adult Contemporary (Billboard)	18
US Adult Pop Airplay (Billboard)	19
US Rock & Alternative Airplay (Billboard)	46

=== Year-end charts ===
Chart (2017)	Position
US Adult Contemporary (Billboard)	47
US Hot Rock Songs (Billboard)	23

== Certifications ==
Region	Certification	Certified units/sales
Australia (ARIA)	Gold	35,000^{‡}
Denmark (IFPI Danmark)	Platinum	90,000^{‡}
New Zealand (RMNZ)	Gold	15,000^{‡}
United States (RIAA)	Gold	500,000^{‡}
^{‡} Sales+streaming figures based on certification alone.
