= Heavier Things =

Studio album by John Mayer
- Released: September 9, 2003
- Recorded: April–June 2003
- Studios: Avatar, New York City; Ocean Way, Hollywood
- Genres: Soft rock; pop
- Length: 45:33
- Labels: Aware; Columbia
- Producer: Jack Joseph Puig

John Mayer chronology
Room for Squares (2001)	Heavier Things (2003)	Continuum (2006)

Singles from Heavier Things
- 1. "Bigger than My Body" Released: August 25, 2003; 2. "Clarity" Released: April 12, 2004; 3. "Daughters" Released: September 28, 2004

Heavier Things is the second studio album by American singer-songwriter John Mayer, released on September 9, 2003, by Aware and Columbia Records. It debuted at number one on the US Billboard 200, selling over 317,000 copies in its first week. Despite some criticism towards Mayer's songwriting, Heavier Things received generally positive reviews.

== Background ==
There's a certain swing-for-the-fences feel and a hurried nature that I think you have when you're making your first record and have much to prove. Now that I'm in a higher gear, I don't have to press so hard on the gas, and I'm loving it.

— John Mayer, Billboard, 2003

Mayer felt he could be more relaxed focused on his art while making Heavier Things. With Jack Joseph Puig as producer, loops and horns were more prominently featured. Mayer took greater control of the creative side with this album; much of it was recorded in his New York City apartment. He also got final approval on all radio edits. Mayer explained that he did not want a "big and bold" title for the record and expressed that the name Heavier Things is "what it is" due to its "insignificance". He further said that he likes the word "things" due to finding it "nondescript and dumb, [...] kind of blunt".

Columbia Records used a conservative marketing campaign to promote the album. Columbia Records Group president Will Botwin says, "We think we're being smart. It's a long-term project. We understand what we're creating is a career. Effectively, that's the message: Keep the hype at bay." In keeping with that gameplan, the album's first single, "Bigger than My Body", only went to radio a few weeks before the album's release; promotional broadcasts of the album were limited to MTV.com and Mayer's official site, both of whom began streaming the complete album the September 2 before its release. Scheduled television appearances included Saturday Night Live on October 4 and several late shows. Columbia Records thought it was important to put Mayer in talk show-type scenarios before the album release to help bring focus to his art and to his singer/songwriter career, and to steer away from the fame and celebrity hype.

== Singles ==
Despite being "delayed" on the radio, the lead single "Bigger than My Body" gained commercial and critical success. "Clarity" was the second single released from Heavier Things. Although the song receives rare airplay, it is one of Mayer's fan favorites, and is normally performed at Mayer's concerts. The song received very positive reviews from critics, mostly being praised for its relaxing style and beat.

"Daughters" was the last single released from Heavier Things. The song has become a huge commercial success, and has received largely positive reviews: several critics called the song as Mayer's best yet.

== Critical reception ==
Professional ratings
Review scores
Source	Rating
AllMusic	3.5/5 stars
Blender	3/5 stars
Entertainment Weekly	C+
Los Angeles Times	2.5/4 stars
PopMatters	6/10
Robert Christgau	(1-star Honorable Mention)
Rolling Stone	4/5 stars
Slant Magazine	3/5 stars
Spin	5/10
USA Today	3.5/4 stars

Upon its release, the album received generally positive reviews from music critics; it holds an aggregate score of 67/100 at Metacritic. Billboard magazine stated that it "firmly establishes him as a legitimate--albeit still puppy-eyed--singer/songwriter." Chicago Tribune writer Allison Stewart gave the album a favorable review and wrote that Mayer "[has] crafted a sturdy, soulful pop album that credibly expands upon — but never abandons — his core sound". Despite writing that "his self-conscious lyrics can get in the way", Russell Baillie of The New Zealand Herald praised Mayer's musicianship and gave the album 4 out of 5 stars. Rolling Stone magazine's James Hunter called Heavier Things an "equally available yet more sophisticated album" than Room for Squares. In his own review for Esquire, Mayer gave the album a "B minus", adding, "Am I the only one who finds this record creepy to make out to?" Spin said, "Sadly, Mayer's idea of a good time involves hiring jazz musicians to make himself sound like '80s James Taylor."

=== Accolades ===
Mayer earned his first number-one single with "Daughters" as well as a 2005 Grammy for Song of the Year, beating out fellow contenders Hoobastank, Alicia Keys, Tim McGraw, and Kanye West. He dedicated the award to his grandmother, Annie Hoffman, who died in May 2004. He also won Best Male Pop Vocal Performance, beating Elvis Costello, Josh Groban, Prince, and Seal for the award. At the 37th Annual Songwriters Hall of Fame Induction Ceremony in 2006, Mayer was honored with the Hal David Starlight Award.

== Track listing ==
All tracks are written by John Mayer except where noted.

No.	Title	Writer(s)	Length
1.	"Clarity"		4:28
2.	"Bigger than My Body"		4:26
3.	"Something's Missing"		5:04
4.	"New Deep"		4:07
5.	"Come Back to Bed"		5:23
6.	"Home Life"	Mayer, David LaBruyere	4:14
7.	"Split Screen Sadness"		5:06
8.	"Daughters"		3:58
9.	"Only Heart"		3:52
10.	"Wheel"		5:33

Promotional bonus disc
No.	Title	Writer(s)	Length
1.	"Clarity" (acoustic; recorded live in the Star Lounge on 12/9/03)		4:23
2.	"Neon" (recorded live at Allstate Arena, Chicago IL on 11/28/03)		6:14
3.	"Come Back to Bed" (recorded live at The Palace, Detroit MI on 11/29/03)		10:47
4.	"Kid A"	Colin Greenwood, Jonathan Greenwood, Ed O'Brien, Phil Selway, Thomas Yorke	2:53
5.	"Clarity" (single remix)		4:15

== Personnel ==
Main musicians

- John Mayer – vocals on all tracks, guitars on all tracks
- David LaBruyere – bass guitar on all tracks except 8
- Jamie Muhoberac – keyboards on all tracks except 9
- Lenny Castro – percussion on all tracks except 6, 9 and 10

Additional musicians

- Matt Chamberlain – drums on tracks 1, 2, 3, 6 and 10
- Steve Jordan – drums on tracks 3, 4 and 5
- Greg Leisz – lap steel guitar on tracks 2 and 5
- Questlove – drums on track 1
- Roy Hargrove – trumpet on track 1
- Michael Chaves – guitar on track 3
- Dan Higgins – saxophone on track 5
- Jerry Hey – trumpet on track 5
- Leroy – programming on track 7
- J. J. Johnson – drums on track 9

Additional personnel

- John Mayer – art direction
- Jack Joseph Puig – production, mixing, recording
- Chad Franscoviak – engineering
- Ross Petersen – additional engineering
- Chris Steffen – additional engineering
- Lars Fox – digital engineering
- Bob Ludwig – mastering
- Ames Design – graphic design
- Danny Clinch – photography
- Chapman Baehler – album cover photography

== Charts ==
=== Weekly charts ===
Chart (2003–05)	Peak position
Australian Albums (ARIA)	4
Canadian Albums (Billboard)	3
Danish Albums (Hitlisten)	5
Dutch Albums (Album Top 100)	19
German Albums (Offizielle Top 100)	60
Irish Albums (IRMA)	72
New Zealand Albums (RMNZ)	15
UK Albums (Official Charts)	74
US Billboard 200	1

=== Year-end charts ===
Chart (2003)	Position
Australian Albums (ARIA)	65
US Billboard 200	67
Chart (2004)	Position
US Billboard 200	83
Chart (2005)	Position
US Billboard 200	83

== Certifications ==
Region	Certification	Certified units/sales
Australia (ARIA)	Platinum	70,000^{^}
Canada (Music Canada)	Platinum	100,000^{^}
Denmark (IFPI Danmark)	2× Platinum	40,000^{‡}
Netherlands (NVPI)	Gold	40,000^{^}
New Zealand (RMNZ)	Gold	7,500^{^}
United Kingdom (BPI)	Silver	60,000^{‡}
United States (RIAA)	3× Platinum	3,000,000^{^}
^{^} Shipments figures based on certification alone.^{‡} Sales+streaming figures based on certification alone.

== See also ==
- List of number-one albums of 2003 (U.S.)
