= So Fresh: The Hits of Summer 2011 + The Best of 2010 =

So Fresh: The Hits of Summer 2011

Compilation album by Various Artists
- Released: 19 November 2010
- Genre: Pop
- Label: Sony Music

So Fresh chronology
So Fresh: The Hits of Spring 2010 (2010)	So Fresh: The Hits of Summer 2011 (2010)	So Fresh: The Hits of Autumn 2011 (2011)

So Fresh: The Hits of Summer 2011 + The Best of 2010 is a compilation album consisting of popular songs in the Australian ARIA Charts from 2010, as well as the most popular songs of the summer. The album was released on 19 November 2010.

== Track listing ==
=== Disc 1 ===
1. Rihanna – "Only Girl (In the World)" (3:56)
2. Pitbull featuring T-Pain – "Hey Baby (Drop It to the Floor)" (3:32)
3. Enrique Iglesias featuring Nicole Scherzinger – "Heartbeat" (3:47)
4. Nelly – "Just a Dream" (3:58)
5. Vanessa Amorosi featuring Seany B – "Mr. Mysterious" (3:44)
6. Jessica Mauboy featuring Snoop Dogg – "Get 'Em Girls" (3:57)
7. The Script – "For the First Time" (4:11)
8. Taio Cruz featuring Ludacris – "Break Your Heart" (3:06)
9. Lady Gaga – "Alejandro" (4:35)
10. Brooke Fraser – "Something in the Water" (2:59)
11. Short Stack – "Planets" (3:32)
12. Adam Lambert – "For Your Entertainment" (3:35)
13. The Black Eyed Peas – "Imma Be" (3:54)
14. Little Red – "Rock It" (3:28)
15. Amy Meredith – "Lying" (2:57)
16. The Potbelleez – "Shake It" (3:17)
17. Ou Est le Swimming Pool – "Dance the Way I Feel" (3:27)
18. Stan Walker featuring Kayo – "Homesick" (3:44)
19. Mike Posner – "Please Don't Go" (3:18)
20. Justice Crew – "And Then We Dance" (3:01)

=== Disc 2 ===
1. Usher featuring will.i.am – "OMG" (4:03)
2. Justin Bieber – "U Smile" (3:16)
3. will.i.am and Nicki Minaj – "Check It Out" (3:57)
4. Kesha – "Your Love Is My Drug"
5. Richard Vission and Static Revenger featuring Luciana – "I Like That" (2:22)
6. Shakira featuring Freshlyground – "Waka Waka (This Time for Africa)" (3:21)
7. Train – "Save Me, San Francisco" (4:06)
8. Brian McFadden featuring Delta Goodrem – "Mistakes" (3:43)
9. Cheryl Cole featuring will.i.am – "3 Words" (4:33)
10. Christina Aguilera – "Not Myself Tonight" (3:05)
11. Timbaland featuring Katy Perry – "If We Ever Meet Again" (3:59)
12. Kevin Rudolf featuring Birdman, Jay Sean and Lil Wayne – "I Made It (Cash Money Heroes)" (4:18)
13. Yolanda Be Cool and DCUP – "We No Speak Americano" (2:59)
14. Lissie – "When I'm Alone" (3:42)
15. Michael Paynter – "Love the Fall" (3:01)
16. John Mayer – "Heartbreak Warfare" (4:27)
17. Sean Kingston and Justin Bieber – "Eenie Meenie" (3:21)
18. Mark Ronson and The Business Intl. – "Bang Bang Bang" (3:54)
19. Scarlett Belle featuring Miracle and Israel Cruz – "Freak Tonight" (3:48)

== Charts ==
=== Year-end charts ===
Chart (2010)	Peak position
Australian ARIA Compilations Chart	1

Chart (2011)	Peak position
Australian ARIA Compilations Chart	9

== Certifications ==
Region	Certification	Certified units/sales
Australia (ARIA)	3× Platinum	210,000^{^}
^{^} Shipments figures based on certification alone.
