= So Fresh: The Hits of Spring 2010 =

Compilation album by Various Artists
- Released: 10 September 2010
- Genre: Pop
- Label: Sony Music

So Fresh chronology
So Fresh: The Hits of Winter 2010 (2010)	So Fresh: The Hits of Spring 2010 (2010)	So Fresh: The Hits of Summer 2011 + The Best of 2010 (2011)

So Fresh: The Hits of Spring 2010 is a compilation album in the So Fresh series. It was released on 10 September 2010.

== Track listing ==
1. Enrique Iglesias featuring Pitbull – "I Like It" (3:53)
2. Taio Cruz – "Dynamite" (3:23)
3. Usher featuring Pitbull – "DJ Got Us Fallin' in Love" (3:42)
4. Kesha – "Take It Off" (3:35)
5. Michael Paynter and The Veronicas – "Love the Fall" (3:00)
6. Vanessa Amorosi – "Holiday" (3:18)
7. Rihanna featuring Slash – "Rockstar 101" (4:00)
8. Stan Walker – "Choose You" (3:38)
9. Train – "If It's Love" (3:51)
10. Amy Meredith – "Young at Heart" (3:52)
11. Ou Est le Swimming Pool – "Dance the Way I Feel" (3:27)
12. Justin Bieber – "Somebody to Love" (3:41)
13. Mike Posner – "Cooler than Me" (3:34)
14. Gyroscope – "Baby, I'm Gettin' Better" (3:19)
15. The Potbelleez – "Hello" (3:29)
16. Alexandra Burke featuring Pitbull – "All Night Long" (3:48)
17. Maroon 5 – "Misery" (3:27)
18. Dane Rumble – "Always Be Here" (3:45)
19. Hayley Warner – "Hands Off" (2:36)
20. Ed Kowalczyk – "Grace" (3:14)

== DVD ==
1. Taio Cruz – "Dynamite"
2. Kesha – "Take It Off"
3. Michael Paynter and The Veronicas – "Love the Fall"
4. Vanessa Amorosi – "Holiday"
5. Rihanna featuring Slash – "Rockstar 101"
6. Train – "If It's Love"
7. Amy Meredith – "Young at Heart"
8. Ou Est Le Swimming Pool – "Dance the Way I Feel"
9. Mike Posner – "Cooler Than Me"
10. Gyroscope – "Baby, I'm Gettin' Better"
11. Alexandra Burke featuring Pitbull – "All Night Long"
12. Maroon 5 – "Misery"

== Charts ==
=== Year-end charts ===
Chart (2010)	Peak position
Australian ARIA Compilations Chart	6

== Certifications ==
Region	Certification	Certified units/sales
Australia (ARIA)	Platinum	70,000^{^}
^{^} Shipments figures based on certification alone.
