= So Fresh: The Hits of Winter 2010 =

Compilation album by Various Artists
- Released: 18 June 2010
- Genre: Pop
- Label: Sony BMG

So Fresh chronology
So Fresh: The Hits of Autumn 2010 (2010)	So Fresh: The Hits of Winter 2010 (2010)	So Fresh: The Hits of Spring 2010 (2010)

So Fresh: The Hits of Winter 2010 is an Australian compilation album. It was released on 18 June 2010.

== Track listing ==
1. Usher featuring will.i.am – "OMG" (4:30)
2. Brian McFadden featuring Kevin Rudolf – "Just Say So" (3:17)
3. Christina Aguilera – "Not Myself Tonight" (3:05)
4. Rihanna – "Te Amo" (3:20)
5. Vanessa Amorosi featuring Seany B – "Mr. Mysterious" (3:44)
6. Taio Cruz featuring Ludacris – "Break Your Heart" (3:06)
7. Train – "Hey, Soul Sister" (3:36)
8. Lady Gaga – "Alejandro" (The Sound of Arrows Remix) (3:58)
9. Kesha – "Your Love Is My Drug" (3:07)
10. Adam Lambert – "If I Had You" (3:45)
11. Justin Bieber featuring Ludacris – "Baby" (3:36)
12. Timbaland featuring Katy Perry – "If We Ever Meet Again" (3:59)
13. Cheryl Cole – "Fight for This Love" (3:42)
14. Stan Walker – "Unbroken" (4:34)
15. The Black Eyed Peas – "Imma Be" (3:53)
16. Scouting for Girls – "This Ain't a Love Song" (3:08)
17. John Mayer – "Heartbreak Warfare" (4:27)
18. Amy Meredith – "Lying" (2:56)
19. Florence and the Machine – "Dog Days Are Over" (4:11)
20. Scarlett Belle – "Closure" (3:37)

=== DVD ===
1. Usher featuring will.i.am – "OMG"
2. Brian McFadden featuring Kevin Rudolf – "Just Say So"
3. Christina Aguilera – "Not Myself Tonight"
4. Taio Cruz featuring Ludacris – "Break Your Heart"
5. Vanessa Amorosi featuring Seany B – "Mr. Mysterious"
6. Train – "Hey, Soul Sister"
7. Black Eyed Peas – "Imma Be"
8. Kesha – "Your Love Is My Drug"
9. John Mayer – "Heartbreak Warfare"
10. Justin Bieber featuring Ludacris – "Baby"
11. Cheryl Cole – "Fight For This Love"
12. Stan Walker – "Unbroken"

== Charts ==
=== Year-end charts ===
Chart (2010)	Peak position
Australian ARIA Compilations Chart	5

== Certifications ==
Region	Certification	Certified units/sales
Australia (ARIA)	Platinum	70,000^{^}
^{^} Shipments figures based on certification alone.
