= Born and Raised World Tour =

2013–14 concert tour by John Mayer

- Tour by John Mayer
- Promotional poster for the tour
- Location: North America
- Associated album: Born and Raised; Paradise Valley
- Start date: July 6, 2013
- End date: September 20, 2014
- Legs: 9
- No. of shows: 96

John Mayer concert chronology
- Battle Studies World Tour (2009–10); Born and Raised World Tour (2013–14); The Search for Everything World Tour (2017)

The Born and Raised World Tour was the sixth headlining concert tour by American singer John Mayer in support of his fifth and sixth studio albums, Born and Raised (2012) and Paradise Valley (2013). On March 22, 2013, the tour was first announced and tickets went on sale March 29 and 30, 2013. The tour began on July 6, 2013 in Milwaukee and ended in June 2014. This was Mayer's first tour in three years and after undergoing his vocal surgery.

== Opening acts ==
- Phillip Phillips
- Needtobreathe (Bonner Springs)
- Andreas Moe (London, 9 June 2014)

== Set list ==
(John played 78 different songs on the tour, only songs played at at least 1/3 of the 96 shows are listed here and are not in any particular order.)

1. "Queen of California"
2. "Paper Doll"
3. "I Don't Trust Myself (With Loving You)"
4. "Something Like Olivia"
5. "Wildfire"
6. "Who Says"
7. "Going Down the Road Feeling Bad" (Cliff Carlisle cover)
8. "Vultures"
9. "Speak for Me"
10. "Waiting on the Day"
11. "Slow Dancing in a Burning Room"
12. "Your Body is a Wonderland"
13. "Half of My Heart"
14. "Born and Raised"
15. "Dear Marie"
16. "If I Ever Get Around to Living"
17. "Age of Worry"
18. "Gravity"
19. "Waiting on the World to Change"
20. "A Face to Call Home"

Notes

- "Who You Love" was performed with Katy Perry on December 17, 2013.

== Tour dates ==
Date	City	Country	Venue
North America leg 1
July 6, 2013 (Note: The concert on July 6, 2013, was a part of Summerfest.)	Milwaukee	United States	Marcus Amphitheater
July 7, 2013	Maryland Heights	United States	Verizon Wireless Amphitheater
July 9, 2013	Cincinnati	United States	Riverbend Music Center
July 10, 2013	Bonner Springs	United States	Sandstone Amphitheater
July 12, 2013	The Woodlands	United States	Cynthia Woods Mitchell Pavilion
July 13, 2013	Dallas	United States	Gexa Energy Pavilion
July 16, 2013	Morrison	United States	Red Rocks Amphitheatre
July 17, 2013	Morrison	United States	Red Rocks Amphitheatre
July 19, 2013	Ridgefield	United States	Sleep Country Amphitheater
July 20, 2013	George	United States	The Gorge Amphitheatre
July 22, 2013 (Note: The concert on July 22, 2013, was a part of the California Mid State Fair.)	Paso Robles	United States	California Mid State Fair
July 24, 2013	Wheatland	United States	Sleep Train Amphitheatre
July 26, 2013	Mountain View	United States	Shoreline Amphitheatre
July 27, 2013	Irvine	United States	Verizon Wireless Amphitheatre
August 6, 2013	Cuyahoga Falls	United States	Blossom Music Center
August 7, 2013	Clarkston	United States	DTE Energy Music Theatre
August 9, 2013	Tinley Park	United States	First Midwest Bank Amphitheatre
August 10, 2013	Noblesville	United States	Klipsch Music Center
August 11, 2013 (Note: The concert on August 11, 2013, was a part of the Illinois State Fair.)	Springfield	United States	Illinois State Fair
August 13, 2013	Darien Center	United States	Darien Lake Performing Arts Center
August 14, 2013	Toronto	Canada	Molson Canadian Amphitheatre
August 16, 2013	Hartford	United States	Comcast Theatre
August 17, 2013	Mansfield	United States	Comcast Center
August 18, 2013	Gilford	United States	Bank of New Hampshire Pavilion
August 20, 2013	Bethel	United States	Bethel Woods Center for the Arts
August 21, 2013	Holmdel	United States	PNC Bank Arts Center
August 23, 2013	Camden	United States	Susquehanna Bank Center
August 24, 2013	Virginia Beach	United States	Farm Bureau Live
August 25, 2013	Burgettstown	United States	First Niagara Pavilion
August 27, 2013 (Note: The concert on August 27, 2013, was a part of the Great Allentown Fair.)	Allentown	United States	Great Allentown Fair
August 28, 2013	Wantagh	United States	Nikon at Jones Beach Theater
August 30, 2013	Saratoga Springs	United States	Saratoga Performing Arts Center
August 31, 2013	Bristow	United States	Jiffy Lube Live
September 1, 2013	Atlantic City	United States	Borgata
September 4, 2013	Charlotte	United States	Verizon Wireless Amphitheatre
September 5, 2013	Raleigh	United States	Time Warner Cable Music Pavilion
September 7, 2013	Tampa	United States	MidFlorida Credit Union Amphitheatre
September 8, 2013	West Palm Beach	United States	Cruzan Amphitheatre
South America
September 16, 2013	Buenos Aires	Argentina	Luna Park
September 17, 2013	Buenos Aires	Argentina	Luna Park
September 19, 2013	São Paulo	Brazil	Arena Anhembi
September 21, 2013 (Note: The show on September 21, 2013, was a part of Rock in Rio.)	Rio de Janeiro	Brazil	Rock in Rio 5
North America Leg 2
September 27, 2013	Atlanta	United States	Aaron's Amphitheatre
October 1, 2013	Albuquerque	United States	Isleta Amphitheater
October 2, 2013	Phoenix	United States	Ak-Chin Pavilion
October 4, 2013	Chula Vista	United States	Sleep Train Amphitheatre
October 5, 2013	Los Angeles	United States	Hollywood Bowl
Europe Leg 1
October 15, 2013	Herning	Denmark	Jyske Bank Boxen
October 16, 2013	Frederiksberg	Denmark	Forum Copenhagen
October 17, 2013	Oslo	Norway	Oslo Spektrum
October 20, 2013	London	England	The O_{2} Arena
October 22, 2013	Amsterdam	Netherlands	Ziggo Dome
October 23, 2013	Amsterdam	Netherlands	Heineken Music Hall
October 24, 2013	Amsterdam	Netherlands	Heineken Music Hall
October 26, 2013	London	England	Wembley Arena
North America Leg 3
November 22, 2013	Lincoln	United States	Pinnacle Bank Arena
November 23, 2013	Minneapolis	United States	Target Center
November 26, 2013	Louisville	United States	KFC Yum! Center
November 27, 2013	Grand Rapids	United States	Van Andel Arena
November 29, 2013	Memphis	United States	FedExForum
November 30, 2013	Oklahoma City	United States	Chesapeake Energy Arena
December 1, 2013	Wichita	United States	Intrust Bank Arena
December 3, 2013	Columbus	United States	Schottenstein Center
December 4, 2013	Nashville	United States	Bridgestone Arena
December 6, 2013	Austin	United States	Frank Erwin Center
December 7, 2013	New Orleans	United States	New Orleans Arena
December 9, 2013	Orlando	United States	Amway Center
December 10, 2013	Jacksonville	United States	Jacksonville Veterans Memorial Arena
December 12, 2013	North Charleston	United States	North Charleston Coliseum
December 13, 2013	Richmond	United States	Richmond Coliseum
December 14, 2013	Baltimore	United States	Baltimore Arena
December 16, 2013	Bridgeport	United States	Webster Bank Arena
December 17, 2013	Brooklyn	United States	Barclays Center
Australia
April 13, 2014 (Note: The show on April 13, 2014, was a part of the West Coast Blues n Roots.)	Fremantle	Australia	Fremantle Park
April 15, 2014	Adelaide	Australia	Adelaide Entertainment Centre
April 17, 2014 (Note: The show on April 17, 2014, was a part of QByron Bay Bluesfest.)	Byron Bay	Australia	Tyagarah Tea Tree Farm
April 19, 2014 (Note: The concert on April 19, 2014, was a part of the Deni Blues & Roots Festival.)	Deniliquin	Australia	Conargo Road
April 22, 2014	Melbourne	Australia	Rod Laver Arena
April 24, 2014	Sydney	Australia	Allphones Arena
April 26, 2014	Auckland	New Zealand	Vector Arena
Asia
April 30, 2014	Osaka	Japan	Osaka-jō Hall
May 2, 2014	Tokyo	Japan	Nippon Budokan
May 3, 2014	Tokyo	Japan	Nippon Budokan
May 6, 2014	Seoul	South Korea	Jamsil Arena
Europe Leg 2
June 7, 2014	Landgraaf	Netherlands	Pinkpop Festival
June 9, 2014	London	England	The O_{2} Arena
June 12, 2014	Stockholm	Sweden	Ericsson Globe
June 14, 2014 (Note: The concert on June 14, 2014, was a part of the Norwegian Wood Music Fest.)	Oslo	Norway	Norwegian Wood
June 15, 2014 (Note: The concert on June 15, 2014, was a part of Bergenfest.)	Bergen	Norway	Bergenfest
June 17, 2014	Indre By	Denmark	Tivoli
June 18, 2014	Odense	Denmark	Kongens Have
June 20, 2014	Amsterdam	Netherlands	Ziggo Dome
June 22, 2014 (Note: The concert on June 22, 2014, was as the opening act for The Rolling Stones.)	Rome	Italy	Circus Maximus
North America Leg 4
August 31, 2014	Los Angeles	United States	Budweiser Made in America Festival
September 19, 2014	Atlanta	United States	Music MidTown Festival
September 20, 2014	Highland Park	United States	Ravinia Festival

Miscellaneous

== Box office score data ==
- Sold out shows: 7/16/13, 7/17/13, 9/16/13, 9/17/13, 10/3/13, 10/15/13, 10/16/13, 10/17/13, 10/22/13, 10/24/13 and 10/14/13
  10/17/13, 10/20/13, 10/22/13, 10/23/13, 10/24/13.

Venue	City	Tickets sold / available	Gross revenue
Meadowbrook	Gilford	5,576 / 6,193 (90%)	$373,378
Arena Anhembi	São Paulo	30,723 / 30,723 (100%)	$2,310,520
The O_{2} Arena	London (10/20/13)	16,091 / 16,369 (99%)	$910,191
Pinnacle Bank Arena	Lincoln	6,541 / 8,241 (80%)	$390,078
Target Center	Minneapolis	6,254 / 9,000 (70%)	$438,802
Van Andel Arena	Grand Rapids	7,907 / 10,215 (78%)	$408,607
FedExForum	Memphis	7,080 / 8,800 (81%)	$427,795
Chesapeake Energy Arena	Oklahoma City	7,962 / 10,000 (80%)	$471,773
Bridgestone Arena	Nashville	8,441 / 8,441 (100%)	$551,067
Frank Erwin Center	Austin	8,629 / 11,124 (78%)	$522,038
New Orleans Arena	New Orleans	8,516 / 10,000 (86%)	$538,427
Amway Center	Orlando	7,423 / 11,942 (63%)	$430,610
Richmond Coliseum	Richmond	8,597 / 8,597 (100%)	$354,388
Barclays Center	Brooklyn	9,967 / 13,090 (77%)	$754,975
Adelaide Entertainment Centre	Adelaide	3,984 / 4,357 (91%)	$333,787
Rod Laver Arena	Melbourne	8,502 / 9,302 (92%)	$919,120
Allphones Arena	Sydney	9,400 / 9,742 (97%)	$933,622
Vector Arena	Auckland	5,992 / 6,202 (97%)	$579,272
The O_{2} Arena	London (6/9/14)	11,493 / 13,281 (87%)	$694,774
TOTAL		179,078 / 205,619 (87%)	$12,343,224

== Band ==
- Sean Hurley: bass, backing vocals
- Andy Burton: keyboards
- Aaron Sterling: drums
- Zane Carney: rhythm guitar
- Carlos Ricketts: backing vocals
- Tiffany Palmer: backing vocals
- Doug Pettibone: guitar, pedal steel guitar

== Critical reception ==
Piet Levy of the Milwaukee Journal Sentinel said, "Mayer sounded sublime Saturday, as though his soulful voice had been dipped in honey, from the opening vocals of the rustic Raised track 'Queen of California'." Dan Hyman from Rolling Stone said, "Mayer's voice was the elephant in the room all evening. The singer has taken many songs down into a noticeable lower vocal register – a change-up most noticeable on 'Waiting on the World to Change', during which he forwent all of his falsetto parts. But on the whole singer's voice sounded strong and confident."
