= Half of My Heart (disambiguation) =

"Half of My Heart" is a 2009 song by John Mayer from his album Battle Studies featuring Taylor Swift.

Half of My Heart may also refer to:

- "Half of My Heart", the love theme from the 1957 film Jeanne Eagels
- "Half of My Heart", a 1961 song by Emile Ford
- "Half of My Heart", a 2000 song by The Mooney Suzuki from People Get Ready
- "Half of My Heart", a 2019 song by Megan McKenna
- "Half of My Heart", a 2006 song by Survivor from Reach
