= Who Says =

"Who Says" may refer to:

- "Who Says" (Selena Gomez & the Scene song), 2011
- "Who Says" (John Mayer song), 2009
