= Battle Studies World Tour =

2009–10 concert tour by John Mayer

- World tour by John Mayer
- Location: Europe; North America; Oceania
- Associated album: Battle Studies
- Start date: November 5, 2009
- End date: October 1, 2010
- Legs: 8
- No. of shows: 122

John Mayer concert chronology
- Continuum World Tour (2007–08); Battle Studies World Tour (2009–10); Born and Raised World Tour (2013–14)

The Battle Studies World Tour was a worldwide concert tour by American singer John Mayer. The tour spanned across the North America, Europe, Oceania, and Asia promoting his fourth studio album Battle Studies (2009).

== Background ==
The tour was announced on November 5, 2009, with tickets going on sale November 21, 2009. Paperless ticketing was used for purchasing and entering the concert. The second leg of North America was announced on March 31, beginning in Charlotte, North Carolina on July 16, 2010. The show on August 28 was a co-headline show with Keith Urban.

== Opening acts ==
- Michael Franti and Spearhead
- Orianthi (Australia)
- Lisa Loïs (The Netherlands)
- Train (July 16–30 & August 1–11)
- The Avett Brothers (Bristow, Cuyahoga Falls, Tinley Park & Noblesville)
- Owl City (August 18 – September 11)
- Alberta Cross (UK & The Netherlands)
- Aiza Seguerra (SM Mall of Asia, the Philippines)

== Setlist ==
1. "Chest Fever" (The Band cover)
2. "Vultures"
3. "Clarity"
4. "Why Georgia"
5. "Machine Gun"
6. "Voodoo Child (Slight Return)"
7. "Slow Dancing in a Burning Room"
8. "Beast of Burden" (The Rolling Stone cover)
9. "Perfectly Lonely"
10. "Covered in Rain"
11. "Stop This Train"
12. "Your Body Is a Wonderland"
13. "Good Love Is on the Way"
14. "Gravity"
15. "I've Got Dreams to Remember"
16. "Who Says"
17. "Waiting on the World to Change"
18. "Do You Know Me"
19. "Half of My Heart"

Encore

1. "Wheel"
2. "Edge of Desire"
3. "If You Love Somebody Set Them Free"

== Tour dates ==
Date	City	Country	Venue	Opening act(s)
Oceania leg 1
November 5, 2009	Sydney	Australia	The Metro Theatre	—N/a
November 9, 2009	Adelaide	Australia	Adelaide Entertainment Centre	—N/a
North America leg 1
November 16, 2009	Brooklyn	United States	Music Hall of Williamsburg	—N/a
November 17, 2009	New York City	United States	Beacon Theatre	—N/a
November 24, 2009	Toronto	Canada	Sound Academy	—N/a
December 7, 2009	New York City	United States	China Club	—N/a
December 11, 2009 (Note: The show on December 11, 2009, was a part of Z100's Jingle Ball 2009.)	New York City	United States	Madison Square Garden	—N/a
December 29, 2009 (Note: The show on December 29, 2009, was a John Mayer Trio show.)	San Diego	United States	Copley Symphony Hall	—N/a
December 31, 2009 (Note: The show on December 31, 2009, was a John Mayer Trio show.)	Las Vegas	United States	The Joint	—N/a
Europe leg 1
January 13, 2010	Amsterdam	Netherlands	Heineken Music Hall	Lisa Loïs
January 15, 2010	Manchester	England	Manchester Apollo	—N/a
January 16, 2010	Glasgow	Scotland	O_{2} Academy Glasgow	—N/a
January 18, 2010	London	England	Hammersmith Apollo	—N/a
January 19, 2010	Wolverhampton	England	Wolverhampton Civic Hall	—N/a
North America leg 2
February 4, 2010	Sunrise	United States	BankAtlantic Center	Michael Franti and Spearhead
February 5, 2010	Tampa	United States	St. Pete's Time Forum	Michael Franti and Spearhead
February 6, 2010	Jacksonville	United States	Jacksonville Veterans Memorial Arena	Michael Franti and Spearhead
February 8, 2010	North Charleston	United States	North Charleston Coliseum	Michael Franti and Spearhead
February 9, 2010	Birmingham	United States	BJCC Arena	Michael Franti and Spearhead
February 10, 2010	Nashville	United States	Nashville Arena	Michael Franti and Spearhead
February 12, 2010	Auburn Hills	United States	The Palace of Auburn Hills	Michael Franti and Spearhead
February 13, 2010	London	Canada	John Labatt Centre	Michael Franti and Spearhead
February 14, 2010	Toronto	Canada	Air Canada Centre	Michael Franti and Spearhead
February 16, 2010	Ottawa	Canada	Canadian Tire Centre	Michael Franti and Spearhead
February 17, 2010	Montreal	Canada	Bell Centre	Michael Franti and Spearhead
February 19, 2010	Uncasville	United States	Mohegan Sun Arena	Michael Franti and Spearhead
February 20, 2010	Washington, D.C.	United States	Verizon Center	Michael Franti and Spearhead
February 21, 2010	Philadelphia	United States	Wells Fargo Center	Michael Franti and Spearhead
February 24, 2010	Boston	United States	TD Garden	Michael Franti and Spearhead
February 25, 2010	New York City	United States	Madison Square Garden	Michael Franti and Spearhead
February 26, 2010	New York City	United States	Madison Square Garden	Michael Franti and Spearhead
February 28, 2010	Grand Rapids	United States	Van Andel Arena	Michael Franti and Spearhead
March 1, 2010	Milwaukee	United States	BMO Harris Bradley Center	Michael Franti and Spearhead
March 2, 2010	Saint Paul	United States	Xcel Energy Center	Michael Franti and Spearhead
March 4, 2010	Omaha	United States	Qwest Center Omaha	Michael Franti and Spearhead
March 5, 2010	Oklahoma City	United States	Oklahoma City Arena	Michael Franti and Spearhead
March 6, 2010	Houston	United States	Toyota Center	Michael Franti and Spearhead
March 8, 2010	Austin	United States	Frank Erwin Center	Michael Franti and Spearhead
March 9, 2010	Dallas	United States	American Airlines Center	Michael Franti and Spearhead
March 10, 2010	New Orleans	United States	New Orleans Arena	Michael Franti and Spearhead
March 12, 2010	Columbus	United States	Nationwide Arena	Michael Franti and Spearhead
March 13, 2010	Louisville	United States	KFC Yum! Center	Michael Franti and Spearhead
March 15, 2010	Greensboro	United States	Greensboro Coliseum	Michael Franti and Spearhead
March 16, 2010	Charlottesville	United States	John Paul Jones Arena	Michael Franti and Spearhead
March 17, 2010	Atlanta	United States	Philips Arena	Michael Franti and Spearhead
March 19, 2010	Memphis	United States	FedExForum	Michael Franti and Spearhead
March 20, 2010	St. Louis	United States	Scottrade Center	Michael Franti and Spearhead
March 22, 2010	Kansas City	United States	Sprint Center	Michael Franti and Spearhead
March 23, 2010	Denver	United States	Pepsi Center	Michael Franti and Spearhead
March 25, 2010	Los Angeles	United States	Staples Center	Michael Franti and Spearhead
March 26, 2010	San Jose	United States	HP Pavilion	Michael Franti and Spearhead
March 27, 2010	Las Vegas	United States	Mandalay Bay Events Center	Michael Franti and Spearhead
March 30, 2010	Portland	United States	Rose Garden	Michael Franti and Spearhead
March 31, 2010	Seattle	United States	KeyArena	Michael Franti and Spearhead
April 1, 2010	Vancouver	Canada	General Motors Place	Michael Franti and Spearhead
April 3, 2010	Calgary	Canada	Pengrowth Saddledome	Michael Franti and Spearhead
April 4, 2010	Edmonton	Canada	Rexall Place	Michael Franti and Spearhead
April 6, 2010	Saskatoon	Canada	Credit Union Centre	Michael Franti and Spearhead
April 7, 2010	Winnipeg	Canada	MTS Centre	Michael Franti and Spearhead
April 8, 2010	Fargo	United States	Fargodome	Michael Franti and Spearhead
April 10, 2010	Chicago	United States	United Center	Michael Franti and Spearhead
Oceania leg 2
April 27, 2010	Wellington	New Zealand	TSB Arena	Orianthi
April 28, 2010	Auckland	New Zealand	Vector Arena	Orianthi
April 30, 2010	Brisbane	Australia	Brisbane Entertainment Centre	Orianthi
May 3, 2010	Melbourne	Australia	Rod Laver Arena	Orianthi
May 5, 2010	Wollongong	Australia	WIN Entertainment Centre	Orianthi
May 7, 2010	Newcastle	Australia	Newcastle Entertainment Centre	Orianthi
May 8, 2010	Sydney	Australia	Sydney Entertainment Centre	Orianthi
Asia leg 1
May 11, 2010	Tokyo	Japan	JCB Hall	—N/a
May 12, 2010	Tokyo	Japan	JCB Hall	—N/a
May 13, 2010	Tokyo	Japan	JCB Hall	—N/a
Europe leg 2
May 21, 2010 (Note: The concert on May 21, 2010, was a part of Rock in Rio.)	Lisbon	Portugal	Rock in Rio	—N/a
May 23, 2010	Cardiff	Wales	Cardiff International Arena	Alberta Cross
May 24, 2010	Birmingham	England	LG Arena	Alberta Cross
May 26, 2010	London	England	Wembley Arena	Alberta Cross
May 27, 2010	London	England	Wembley Arena	Alberta Cross
May 29, 2010	Landgraaf	Netherlands	Pinkpop	Alberta Cross
May 30, 2010	Copenhagen	Denmark	Forum Copenhagen	—N/a
May 31, 2010 (canceled)	Copenhagen	Denmark	Forum Copenhagen	—N/a
June 2, 2010 (canceled)	Amsterdam	Netherlands	Heineken Music Hall	Alberta Cross
June 3, 2010 (canceled)	Amsterdam	Netherlands	Heineken Music Hall	Alberta Cross
June 4, 2010 (canceled)	Madrid	Spain	Rock In Rio	—N/a
June 5, 2010 (canceled)	Manchester	England	Manchester Evening News Arena	Alberta Cross
July 10, 2010 (canceled)	Naas	Ireland	Oxegen Festival	—N/a
July 11, 2010 (canceled)	Balado	Scotland	T in the Park	—N/a
North America leg 3
July 16, 2010	Charlotte	United States	Verizon Wireless Amphitheatre	Train
July 17, 2010	Raleigh	United States	Time Warner Cable Music Pavilion	Train
July 18, 2010	Virginia Beach	United States	Virginia Beach Amphitheater	—N/a
July 21, 2010	Wantagh	United States	Nikon at Jones Beach Theatre	Train
July 22, 2010	Wantagh	United States	Nikon at Jones Beach Theatre	Train
July 24, 2010	Scranton	United States	Toyota Pavilion	Train
July 27, 2010	Cincinnati	United States	Riverbend Music Centre	Train
July 28, 2010	Clarkston	United States	DTE Energy Music Theatre	Train
July 30, 2010	Camden	United States	Susquehanna Bank Center	Train
July 31, 2010	Bristow	United States	Jiffy Lube Live	The Avett Brothers
August 1, 2010	Burgettstown	United States	First Niagara Pavilion	Train
August 3, 2010	Holmdel	United States	PNC Bank Arts Center	Train
August 4, 2010	Bethel	United States	Bethel Woods Center for the Arts	Train
August 5, 2010	Hershey	United States	Hershey Park Stadium	Train
August 6, 2010	Mansfield	United States	Comcast Center	Train
August 7, 2010	Hartford	United States	Comcast Theatre	Train
August 8, 2010	Saratoga Springs	United States	Saratoga Center	Train
August 10, 2010	Darien	United States	Darien Lake Center	Train
August 11, 2010	Toronto	Canada	Molson Amphitheater	Train
August 13, 2010	Cuyahoga Falls	United States	Blossom Music Center	The Avett Brothers
August 14, 2010	Tinley Park	United States	First Midwest Bank Amphitheater	The Avett Brothers
August 15, 2010	Noblesville	United States	Verizon Center	The Avett Brothers
August 18, 2010	Phoenix	United States	Cricket Wireless Pavilion	Owl City
August 20, 2010	Mountain View	United States	Shoreline Amphitheatre	Owl City
August 21, 2010	Wheatland	United States	Sleep Train Amphitheatre	Owl City
August 22, 2010	Los Angeles	United States	Hollywood Bowl	Owl City
August 24, 2010	Irvine	United States	Verizon Wireless Amphitheatre	Owl City
August 25, 2010	Chula Vista	United States	Cricket Wireless Amphitheatre	Owl City
August 28, 2010	George	United States	The Gorge Amphitheatre	—N/a
August 31, 2010	West Valley City	United States	USANA Amphitheater	—N/a
September 1, 2010	Morrison	United States	Red Rocks Amphitheatre	Owl City
September 3, 2010	Tulsa	United States	BOK Center	—N/a
September 4, 2010	Dallas	United States	Superpages.com Center	—N/a
September 5, 2010	The Woodlands	United States	Cynthia Woods Mitchell Pavilion	Owl City
September 6, 2010	Orange Beach	United States	Amphitheater at the Wharf	Owl City
September 8, 2010	Atlanta	United States	Lakewood Amphitheater	Owl City
September 10, 2010	Tampa	United States	Ford Amphitheatre	Owl City
September 11, 2010	West Palm Beach	United States	Cruzan Amphitheatre	Owl City
Asia leg 2
October 1, 2010	Manila	Philippines	SM Mall of Asia Concert Grounds	Aiza Seguerra

- After a sold-out performance in Copenhagen, Mayer was forced to cancel his second show there due to illness, this also affected the remaining European shows in Amsterdam, Lisbon & Manchester to be cancelled also.
- Due to equipment damage from a severe thunderstorm, the concert originally scheduled for July 25, 2010, in Hershey, Pennsylvania was postponed to August 5.

Miscellaneous

== Box office score data ==
Venue	City	Tickets sold / available	Gross revenue
Sound Academy	Toronto	2,214 / 2,214 (100%)	$166,839
Copley Symphony Hall	San Diego	2,270 / 2,270 (100%)	$120,335
The Joint	Las Vegas	3,342 / 3,342 (100%)	$507,695
Heineken Music Hall	Amsterdam	5,531 / 5,531 (100%)	$302,562
BankAtlantic Center	Sunrise	9,702 / 10,274 (95%)	$575,634
St. Pete Times Forum	Tampa	9,992 / 9,992 (100%)	$524,300
Veterans Memorial Arena	Jacksonville	10,236 / 10,236 (100%)	$511,532
Coliseum	North Charleston	7,536 / 7,536 (100%)	$420,172
BJCC Arena	Birmingham	9,404 / 9,404 (100%)	$439,129
The Palace of Auburn Hills	Auburn Hills	10,867 / 10,867 (100%)	$566,573
John Labatt Centre	London	6,300 / 7,847 (81%)	$392,145
Air Canada Centre	Toronto	14,966 / 14,966 (100%)	$1,143,770
Scotiabank Place	Ottawa	5,752 / 6,100 (95%)	$379,417
Bell Centre	Montreal	6,937 / 6,937 (100%)	$467,425
Mohegan Sun Arena	Uncasville	7,891 / 7,891 (100%)	$395,186
Verizon Center	Washington DC	14,262 / 14,262 (100%)	$960,255
Wachovia Center	Philadelphia	11,993 / 11,993 (100%)	$825,977
TD Garden	Boston	14,654 / 14,654 (100%)	$936,350
Van Andel Arena	Grand Rapids	9,010 / 11,268 (80%)	$466,774
Bradley Center	Milwaukee	5,897 / 5,897 (100%)	$355,848
Xcel Energy Center	St. Paul	9,832 / 9,832 (100%)	$646,668
Qwest Center	Omaha	6,730 / 6,730 (100%)	$406,220
Ford Center	Oklahoma City	10,223 / 12,000 (86%)	$585,985
Toyota Center	Houston	11,216 / 11,216 (100%)	$720,063
Frank Erwin Center	Austin	10,531 / 10,531 (100%)	$597,068
American Airlines Center	Dallas	12,131 / 12,699 (96%)	$754,395
New Orleans Arena	New Orleans	10,286 / 12,000 (86%)	$582,935
Greensboro Coliseum	Greensboro	8,852 / 8,852 (100%)	$492,612
John Paul Jones Arena	Charlottesville	7,196 / 7,196 (100%)	$368,304
Philips Arena	Atlanta	13,247 / 13,247 (100%)	$802,265
FedExForum	Memphis	9,737 / 12,000 (82%)	$559,805
Scottrade Center	St. Louis	11,598 / 11,598 (100%)	$631,809
Sprint Center	Kansas City	9,568 / 9,568 (100%)	$532,262
Staples Center	Los Angeles	14,732 / 14,732 (100%)	$1,010,408
Rose Garden	Portland	7,241 / 8,343 (87%)	$451,761
Rexall Place	Edmonton	7,010 / 13,953 (51%)	$501,977
United Center	Chicago	14,583 / 14,583 (100%)	$924,484
Entertainment Centre	Brisbane	7,448 / 7,775 (96%)	$773,500
Rod Laver Arena	Melbourne	11,611 / 12,081 (97%)	$983,573
Entertainment Centre	Newcastle	3,437 / 5,409 (64%)	$311,019
Entertainment Centre	Sydney	10,919 / 11,000 (99%)	$982,024
DTE Energy Music Center	Clarkston	14,896 / 14,896 (100%)	$574,716
Woods Center for the Arts	Bethel	11,474 / 14,750 (78%)	$464,486
Hersheypark Stadium	Hershey	11,633 / 12,776 (91%)	$396,572
Hollywood Bowl	Los Angeles	14,570 / 17,125 (85%)	$1,056,575
Amphitheater at the Wharf	Orange Beach	9,020 / 9,020 (100%)	$493,560
TOTAL		438,477 / 467,393 (94%)	$27,062,964
