= The Golden Year (album) =

2010 studio album by Ou Est le Swimming Pool

Studio album by Ou Est le Swimming Pool
- Released: 11 October 2010
- Genre: Synth-pop
- Length: 40:23
- Label: Fire & Manouvre
- Producer: Anders Kallmark

Singles from The Golden Years
- 1. "Dance the Way I Feel" Released: 7 September 2009; 2. "These New Knights" Released: 29 March 2010; 3. "Jackson's Last Stand" Released: 12 July 2010; 4. "The Key" Released: 10 October 2010

The Golden Year is the only studio album by English synth-pop band Ou Est le Swimming Pool, released on 11 October 2010 by Fire & Manouvre.

== Release ==
The album was originally intended for release in August 2010, but was delayed. The suicide of frontman Charles Haddon on 20 August 2010 led to uncertainties about the status of the album. However, the band's management issued a statement confirming its release in October 2010. It was followed by a fourth single, "The Key".

The original album had been leaked in early 2010, due to the sale of promotional copies on auction sites such as eBay. However, the track listing has since been altered, adding two new songs and removing one.

== Track listing ==
No.	Title	Length
1.	"You Started"	3:27
2.	"The Key"	3:43
3.	"These New Knights"	3:25
4.	"Dance the Way I Feel"	3:26
5.	"Better"	2:58
6.	"Outside"	3:38
7.	"Jackson's Last Stand"	3:06
8.	"Our Lives"	3:46
9.	"Answers"	3:32
10.	"Get Along"	3:12
11.	"Curtain Falls"	2:48
12.	"Next to Nothing"	3:19
Total length:		40:23

The album's original track listing was in a different order. Two songs, "You Started" and "Answers" were added, whilst "The Feeling" was removed.

== Personnel ==
Ou Est le Swimming Pool

- Charles Haddon – vocals, synthesizers, string arrangements
- Caan Capan – vocals
- Joseph Hutchinson – synthesizers

Additional musicians

- Anders Kallmark – synthesizers, grand piano, string arrangements
- Katherine Jenkinson – cello
- Rose Redgrave – viola

Technical

- Anders Kallmark – production, mixing
- Trevor Horn – executive production (track 3)

Artwork

- Japayork – all artwork

== Charts ==
Chart performance for The Golden Year
Chart (2010)	Peak position
Australian Albums (ARIA)	15
Australian Dance Albums (ARIA)	3
Belgian Alternative Albums (Ultratop Flanders)	28
Belgian Heatseekers (Ultratop Flanders)	2
UK Albums (OCC)	178
UK Independent Albums (OCC)	25
UK Independent Album Breakers (OCC)	11
