= Closer (Michael Paynter song) =

Single by Michael Paynter

from the album This Welcome Diversion
- B-side: "Get Low", "Shine on Me"
- Released: 28 June 2008
- Recorded: 2008
- Length: 3:23
- Label: Sony Music Australia
- Songwriter(s): Michael Paynter, Gary Clark (musician)

Michael Paynter singles chronology
"Closer" (2008)	"A Victim Song" (2008)

"Closer" is a song by Australian singer-songwriter, Michael Paynter, released physically and digitally as his debut single on 28 June 2008. The song was used in advertisements for the Seven Network's drama series, City Homicide. It was to be included on Paynter's debut album This Welcome Diversion, however its release was delayed and then cancelled by Sony after Paynter was dropped from the label. However, an acoustic version of the song was included on Paynter's free album Money on Your Tongue. "Closer" peaked at number sixty-one on the ARIA Singles Chart.

== Track listing ==
Closer EP
No.	Title	Length
1.	"Closer" (single edit)	3:25
2.	"Get Low"	3:13
3.	"Shine on Me"	3:58

== Charts ==
Chart performance for "Closer"
Chart (2008)	Peak position
Australia (ARIA)	61

== See also ==
- Love the Fall
