= Battle Studies (album) =

2009 album by John Mayer

Studio album by John Mayer
- Released: November 17, 2009
- Recorded: February–August 2009
- Studios: Battle Studies (Calabasas, California); Capitol (Hollywood); The Village (Los Angeles)
- Genre: Pop rock
- Length: 46:39
- Label: Columbia
- Producers: John Mayer; Steve Jordan

John Mayer chronology
Continuum (2006)	Battle Studies (2009)	Born and Raised (2012)

Singles from Battle Studies
- 1. "Who Says" Released: October 13, 2009; 2. "Heartbreak Warfare" Released: October 19, 2009; 3. "Half of My Heart" Released: June 21, 2010; 4. "Perfectly Lonely" Released: November 13, 2010

Battle Studies is the fourth studio album by American singer-songwriter John Mayer, released on November 17, 2009, by Columbia Records. Production took place from February to August 2009 at Battle Studies recording studio in Calabasas, California, Capitol Studios in Hollywood, and The Village in West Los Angeles, California, and was handled by Mayer and Steve Jordan.

The album debuted at number one on the US Billboard 200, selling over 286,000 copies in its first week of sales. It achieved successful sales in several other countries and produced two singles that attained chart success. Battle Studies received positive reviews from critics, and was certified platinum by the Recording Industry Association of America, having sold over 880,000 copies in the United States.

== Background ==
After the overwhelming success of Continuum, Mayer confessed to being intimidated about starting on a new album; however, he did not want too much time to pass without making new music. Speaking on his motivation to move on, he said, "I think it got a lot easier when I realised that no matter what I do, it's not going to be Continuum, good or bad. And then that became really liberating." On October 1, 2009, Mayer posted via Twitter: "Track listing on Battle Studies is complete! Very interesting order... 11 songs. 45 minutes. Hit 'em hard and get out."

The album was leaked just hours before Mayer was scheduled to perform an official "radio leak" on 103.7 Sophie in San Diego. However, Mayer gave his listeners permission to download the leak, as long as they "registered" their copies by ordering the album.

Mayer's Battle Studies World Tour began on November 5, 2009, in Sydney, Australia at the Metro Theatre, and ended on October 1, 2010, in Manila, Philippines, at SM Mall of Asia.

== Singles ==
According to Mayer's official Twitter profile, "Who Says" was the first single from the album and was released for preview on September 25, 2009, at www.johnmayer.com. The official release for the single was on October 13, 2009.

The second single was "Heartbreak Warfare", which was previewed on October 19, 2009. The first ever augmented reality video accompanied the second single, which was released on Mayer's website.

The third single was "Half of My Heart", which was released for radio airplay on June 21, 2010.

The fourth single was "Perfectly Lonely", which was released on November 13, 2010.

== Critical reception ==
Professional ratings
Aggregate scores
Source	Rating
Metacritic	64/100
Review scores
Source	Rating
AllMusic	3.5/5 stars
Entertainment Weekly	B−
The Guardian	2/5 stars
The Independent	3/5 stars
Los Angeles Times	2.5/4 stars
Mojo	4/5 stars
Q	3/5 stars
Rolling Stone	3/5 stars
Slant Magazine	1.5/5 stars
Sputnikmusic	3.5/5

Battle Studies received generally positive reviews from music critics. At Metacritic, which assigns a normalized rating out of 100 to reviews from mainstream critics, the album received an average score of 64, based on 17 reviews.

Mojo complimented its musical "breadth" and said that the playing is "unfussily superb throughout". AllMusic's Stephen Thomas Erlewine commended Mayer for his musicianship, despite a reliance on "texture". The Boston Globe's Sarah Rodman wrote that he "continues to strip away the twinkly radio lacquer of his earlier work without sacrificing his pop sensibilities". Jackie Hayden of Hot Press called it a "classy pop opus for grown-ups". Although he felt the album lacked depth, Alex Silveri of Sputnikmusic commended Mayer's "knack for dealing with universal themes in thoroughly down to earth ways, and without the layering of pop cheese that so many of his contemporaries indulge in". Leah Greenblatt of Entertainment Weekly called the album "an expertly calibrated study in soft-pedal confessions, searching lyricism, and mildly groovy guitar licks." MSN Music's Robert Christgau gave the album a two-star honorable mention. He cited "War of My Life" and "Perfectly Lonely" as highlights and quipped, "Same kind of problems as Ben Gibbard, only more concise about them (which doesn't necessarily mean smarter, y'know)".

In a mixed review, Andy Gill of The Independent found Mayer's lyrics "ultimately tiresome". Randy Lewis of the Los Angeles Times said that, "for the most part, he expresses himself more eloquently through his guitar than his lyrics". Chicago Sun-Times critic Jim DeRogatis found the album "laden with laughable romantic-schlock lyrics and trite, sappy melodies". Tom Hughes of The Guardian wrote that "Mayer's talents are obvious, but there's so much more cheese than charm here that he would seem like a hard sell outside the Billboard heartland".

The Village Voice columnist Zach Baron stated that it "somehow avoids including any of the myriad things that actually make John Mayer interesting". Jon Caramanica of The New York Times wrote that "the album highlights the extremely blatant chasm between John Mayer the musician and John Mayer the public character, a divide Mr. Mayer said he was eager to maintain". Edna Gundersen of USA Today stated that "there's seldom a cease-fire during Mayer's earnest, solemn musings on romance. While his guitar chops are impeccable on this well-crafted blues-pop album, the gravity and cautious noodling cry out for some input from that other Mayer: his cunning, irreverent public persona."

=== Accolades ===
The album received a Grammy Award nomination for Best Pop Vocal Album but lost to Lady Gaga's The Fame Monster, while "Half of My Heart" was nominated for Best Male Pop Vocal Performance but lost to Bruno Mars' "Just the Way You Are".

== Commercial performance ==
The album debuted at number one on the US Billboard 200 chart and sold 286,000 copies in its first week. In its second week, it sold an additional 93,000 copies and fell to number 13 on the Billboard chart.As of April 2010, the album has sold 880,000 copies in the United States. On July 29, 2010, Battle Studies was certified platinum by the Recording Industry Association of America, for shipments of one million copies in the US.

• As of September 2025, Battle Studies has sold 2.1 million copies in the United States and 2.6 million copies worldwide.

== Track listing ==
All songs written by John Mayer, except where noted.

No.	Title	Length
1.	"Heartbreak Warfare"	4:30
2.	"All We Ever Do Is Say Goodbye"	4:35
3.	"Half of My Heart" (featuring Taylor Swift)	4:10
4.	"Who Says"	2:56
5.	"Perfectly Lonely"	4:28
6.	"Assassin"	5:14
7.	"Crossroads" (Robert Johnson)	2:29
8.	"War of My Life"	4:15
9.	"Edge of Desire"	5:32
10.	"Do You Know Me"	2:30
11.	"Friends, Lovers or Nothing"	5:59
Total length:		46:39

iTunes bonus track version
No.	Title	Length
12.	"I'm on Fire" (Bruce Springsteen)	2:52
Total length:		49:31

=== Expanded edition ===
Battle Studies was later released in a CD/DVD "expanded edition", which added Mayer's VH1 Storytellers episode plus two intimate acoustic performances from his personal travels to Japan in May 2010. The DVD runs for approximately 50 minutes, and the track listing is as follows.

VH1 Storytellers

1. "No Such Thing"
2. "Daughters"
3. "Heartbreak Warfare"
4. "Your Body Is a Wonderland"
5. "Who Says"
6. "Waiting on the World to Change"
7. "Half of My Heart"

A Trip to Japan Alone

7. "Half of My Heart"
8. "Who Says"

== Personnel ==
Musicians

- John Mayer – vocals; guitars; keyboards; sound effects; percussion; production; art direction; graphic design
- Steve Jordan – drums on all tracks; percussion on tracks 5, 6, 8, 10 and 11; production
- Pino Palladino – bass on all tracks except 2, 7 and 8
- Sean Hurley – bass on tracks 2, 7 and 8
- Ian McLagan – Hammond organ on tracks 5, 9 and 11; Wurlitzer electric piano on tracks 5 and 8; piano on tracks 10 and 11; pump organ and celeste on track 4
- Jamie Muhoberac – keyboards on tracks 1 and 9
- Robbie McIntosh – guitar on track 2
- Waddy Wachtel – acoustic guitars on track 3
- Bob Reynolds – saxophone on track 11
- Bryan Lipps – trumpet on track 11
- Taylor Swift – vocals on track 3

Production

- Chad Franscoviak – engineering
- Charlie Paakari – engineering assistance (Capitol Studios)
- Justin Gerrish – engineering assistance (Avatar Studios); mixing assistance on track 10
- Ghian Wright – engineering assistance (The Village Studios)
- Martin Pradler – digital editing
- Michael Brauer – mixing on tracks 1, 2, 4, 6 and 11
- Ryan Gilligan – mixing assistance on tracks 1, 2, 4, 6 and 11
- Manny Marroquin – mixing on tracks 3, 5, 7, 8 and 9
- Erik Madrid – mixing assistance on tracks 3, 5, 7, 8 and 9
- Christian Plata – mixing assistance on tracks 3, 5, 7, 8 and 9
- Joe Ferla – mixing on track 10
- Greg Calbi – mastering

Additional personnel

- Jeri Heiden – art direction; graphic design
- Albert Watson – photography
- Gari Askew – photography
- Carlos Hurtado – tracking
- Roger Love – vocal consultant

== Charts ==
=== Weekly charts ===
Chart (2009–2010)	Peak position
Australian Albums (ARIA)	3
Austrian Albums (Ö3 Austria)	60
Canadian Albums (Billboard)	4
Danish Albums (Hitlisten)	7
Dutch Albums (Album Top 100)	1
German Albums (Offizielle Top 100)	39
Irish Albums (IRMA)	48
New Zealand Albums (RMNZ)	11
Norwegian Albums (VG-lista)	2
Portuguese Albums (AFP)	19
Swedish Albums (Sverigetopplistan)	5
Swiss Albums (Schweizer Hitparade)	45
UK Albums (Official Charts)	35
US Billboard 200	1
US Top Rock Albums (Billboard)	1

=== Year-end charts ===
Chart (2009)	Position
Australian Albums (ARIA)	76
Dutch Albums (Album Top 100)	73

Chart (2010)	Position
Australian Albums (ARIA)	48
Canadian Albums (Billboard)	34
Dutch Albums (Album Top 100)	7
Swedish Albums (Sverigetopplistan)	46
US Billboard 200	19
US Top Rock Albums (Billboard)	1

== Certifications ==
Region	Certification	Certified units/sales
Australia (ARIA)	Platinum	70,000^{^}
Canada (Music Canada)	Platinum	80,000^{^}
Denmark (IFPI Danmark)	3× Platinum	60,000^{‡}
Netherlands (NVPI)	Gold	25,000^{^}
New Zealand (RMNZ)	Gold	7,500^{^}
United Kingdom (BPI)	Gold	100,000^{‡}
United States (RIAA)	2× Platinum	2,000,000^{‡}
^{^} Shipments figures based on certification alone.^{‡} Sales+streaming figures based on certification alone.
