= Restless (Amy Meredith album) =

Studio album by Amy Meredith
- Released: 2 July 2010
- Genre: Pop punk, pop rock
- Label: Sony Music Australia
- Producer: Robert Conley, Brian Paturalski

Amy Meredith chronology
Amy Meredith EP (2008)	Restless (2010)

Singles from Restless
- 1. "Pornstar" Released: 23 October 2009; 2. "Lying" Released: 23 April 2010; 3. "Young at Heart"" Released: 24 September 2010; 4. "Faded White Dress" Released: 17 December 2010

Restless is the debut studio album by Australian band Amy Meredith released on 2 July 2010. The album debuted on the ARIA Albums Chart at number eight and spent seven weeks in the ARIA top 50.

== Critical reception ==
Professional ratings
Review scores
Source	Rating
AllMusic	1.5/5 stars
The AU Review	Negative
iTunes	Negative
Faster Louder	Very negative

Restless has received mostly negative reviews from critics. Allmusic focused heavily on similarities to the Killers and a lack of originality. The AU Review gave another negative review, saying "Unfortunately after "Faded White Dress", the CD starts to sound all too the same. Catchy songs, yes, but nothing to really make me overly excited", before going on to describe a lack of versatility and other shortcomings. Only a fan review in Future Entertainment gave the album seven stars, posting that "It’s almost unnatural to inhibit yourself, and not start moving to the sounds of album."

== Track listing ==
Standard edition

1. "Black Eyes" – 3:40
2. "Pornstar" – 3:16
3. "Lying" – 3:00
4. "Young at Heart" – 3:51
5. "Faded White Dress" – 3:08
6. "Closer" – 2:43
7. "Late Nights" – 3:09
8. "Carry On" – 3:07
9. "Kiss Me Quick" – 2:59
10. "Born to Live" – 3:28
11. "Spin Me Around" – 3:22
12. "Start All Over Again" – 4:20

Digital bonus tracks

13. "Highest Walls" (iTunes exclusive) – 3:37
13. "Violent" (Bandit.fm exclusive) – 3:27

== Singles ==
- "Pornstar" was released on 23 October 2009 and peaked at number 65 on the ARIA Singles Chart.
- "Lying" debuted on the ARIA Singles Chart at number 27, before peaking at number 10.
- "Young at Heart" was released in September 2010 and debuted on the ARIA Singles Chart at number 68 before falling off.
- "Faded White Dress" was released on 17 November 2010 but did not chart on the ARIA Singles Chart.

== Charts ==
Chart (2010)	Peak position
ARIA Albums Chart	8
Australian Artists Albums Chart	5
ARIA Digital Albums Chart	11

== Personnel ==
- Christian Lo Russo – vocals, keyboards
- Joel Chapman – lead & rhythm guitars
- Cameron Laing – lead & rhythm guitars
- Wade Osborn – bass guitars
- Kosta Theodosis – drums, percussions
- Robert Conley – co-writer and producer
- Brian Paturalski – producer

== Release history ==
Region	Date	Label	Format	Catalogue	Classification
Australia	2 July 2010	Sony Music Australia	CD, digital download	88697731042	Teeny-pop
