= Heartbreak Warfare =

2009 single by John Mayer

Single by John Mayer

from the album Battle Studies
- Released: October 19, 2009
- Length: 4:29
- Label: Columbia
- Songwriter: John Mayer
- Producers: John Mayer; Steve Jordan

John Mayer singles chronology
"Who Says" (2009)	"Heartbreak Warfare" (2009)	"Half of My Heart" (2010)

"Heartbreak Warfare" is a song by American singer-songwriter John Mayer, featured on his fourth studio album, Battle Studies (2009). Written by Mayer and produced by Mayer and drummer Steve Jordan, the song is the opening track on the album, and was released as the second single from the album on October 19, 2009. The song was featured in the movie Date Night.

== Music video ==
The music video for the song was an "augmented reality". Despite being an expensive venture, the video was successfully completed, and began being previewed on October 19, 2009.

A second music video for the song was released on April 12, 2010.

== Personnel ==
Musicians

- John Mayer – vocals, guitars, production
- Steve Jordan – drums, production
- Pino Palladino – bass
- Jamie Muhoberac – keyboards

Additional personnel

- Chad Franscoviak – engineering
- Martin Pradler – digital editing
- Michael Brauer – mixing
- Ryan Gilligan – mixing assistance
- Greg Calbi – mastering

== Chart performance ==
"Heartbreak Warfare" debuted on the Billboard Hot 100 at number 100. On the week ending January 2, 2010, it re-entered the chart at number 85 and later peaked at number 34.

=== Weekly charts ===
Chart (2009–2010)	Peak position
Australia (ARIA)	31
Canada Hot 100 (Billboard)	62
Denmark (Tracklisten)	29
Japan Hot 100 (Billboard)	23
Netherlands (Dutch Top 40)	3
Netherlands (Single Top 100)	6
New Zealand (Recorded Music NZ)	34
Sweden (Sverigetopplistan)	54
US Billboard Hot 100	34
US Adult Alternative Airplay (Billboard)	3
US Adult Contemporary (Billboard)	11
US Adult Pop Airplay (Billboard)	3
US Hot Rock & Alternative Songs (Billboard)	39
US Pop Airplay (Billboard)	23
US Rock & Alternative Airplay (Billboard)	39
US Smooth Jazz Airplay (Billboard)	28

=== Year-end charts ===
Chart (2010)	Position
Japan Adult Contemporary (Billboard)	62
Netherlands (Dutch Top 40)	3
Netherlands (Single Top 100)	38
US Adult Contemporary (Billboard)	21
US Adult Top 40 (Billboard)	20

== Certifications ==
Region	Certification	Certified units/sales
Australia (ARIA)	Platinum	70,000^{‡}
Denmark (IFPI Danmark)	Platinum	90,000^{‡}
New Zealand (RMNZ)	Gold	15,000^{‡}
United States (RIAA)	Platinum	1,000,000^{^}
^{^} Shipments figures based on certification alone.^{‡} Sales+streaming figures based on certification alone.
