= Dance the Way I Feel =

2009 single by Ou Est Le Swimming Pool

- First release cover

Single by Ou Est Le Swimming Pool

from the album The Golden Year
- B-side: "Enough Ready"; "Outside"
- Released: 7 September 2009
- Genre: Synthpop
- Length: 3:21 (single version); 3:16 (album version)
- Label: Stiff
- Songwriter(s): Charles Haddon, and Joe Hutchinson, Anders Kallmark
- Producer(s): Anders Kallmark

Ou Est Le Swimming Pool singles chronology
"Dance the Way I Feel" (2009)	"These New Knights" (2010)

Second release
- Used for all 3 formats.

"Dance the Way I Feel" is the debut single of British synthpop band Ou Est Le Swimming Pool. It was first released on 7 September 2009 as a limited edition 7-inch vinyl, and, on 9 November, it received a wider release across three formats.

== Background ==
Three distinct versions of the song exist. The first appeared on the original release of the single. The second was a slightly remixed version of the first with different vocals, but was only available on a promo edition of the band's debut album. The third is the first with a new drum track added, and is the main single, album, and video version.

On 26 January 2011 the song was voted Number 3 on Triple J Hottest 100 for 2010.

== Track listings ==
First release 7-inch

1. "Dance the Way I Feel"
2. "Enough Ready"

CD

1. "Dance the Way I Feel"
2. "Dance the Way I Feel" (Armand Van Helden Club Mix)
3. "Dance the Way I Feel" (Blue Eyed Boy Remix)
4. "Dance the Way I Feel" (The Drill Club Mix)

7-inch

1. "Dance the Way I Feel"
2. "Outside"

12-inch

1. "Dance the Way I Feel" (Armand Van Helden Club Mix)
2. "Dance the Way I Feel" (Armand Van Helden Dub)

== Charts ==
=== Weekly charts ===
Chart (2009–2010)	Peak position
Australia (ARIA)	16
Belgium (Ultratop 50 Flanders)	20
New Zealand (Recorded Music NZ)	20
UK Indie (OCC)	10

=== Year-end charts ===
Chart (2010)	Position
Australia (ARIA)	79

== Certifications ==
Region	Certification	Certified units/sales
Australia (ARIA)	Platinum	70,000^{^}
^{^} Shipments figures based on certification alone.
