= Ou Est le Swimming Pool =

English band

Ou Est Le Swimming Pool
- Origin: Camden, London, England
- Genres: Synth-pop; indietronica
- Years active: 2009–2010
- Labels: Stiff; Fire & Manouvre
- Past members: Caan Capan; Charles Haddon; Joe Hutchinson

Ou Est Le Swimming Pool were an English synth-pop group from Camden, London, consisting of Caan Capan, Charles Haddon, and Joe Hutchinson.

The band name is an amalgamation of French (où est le: where is the) and English (swimming pool) and is inspired by a line from French teacher Mrs. Crabbe (played by Pam Ferris) in the television series Hardwicke House. They released four singles.

== History ==
In 2009, the band released and re-released their debut single, "Dance the Way I Feel", before supporting La Roux on their UK tour. In 2010, the band released the singles "These New Knights", "Jackson's Last Stand" and "The Key" as well as their debut album The Golden Year.

The band played at Glastonbury Festival and Bestival in 2009 and supported La Roux on their tour in early 2010. In May 2010, they played at Evolution Festival and in July at Global Gathering, along with a series of festivals all over Europe throughout the summer of 2010.

They appear on Tiësto's fifth album A Town Called Paradise on the song "The Feeling".

=== Charles Haddon's death and disbandment ===
On 20 August 2010, Charles Haddon, the lead singer of the band, died after a performance at Pukkelpop, Belgium. He died by suicide in the backstage artists' parking area. Haddon was reported to have been distressed after he feared he had seriously injured a young girl earlier after a stage dive. Haddon was 22 years old.

On 3 October 2010, the remaining Ou Est Le Swimming Pool members arranged a festival, billed as Chazzstock, in honour of Haddon at Koko in Camden, London. The Kooks, Mr Hudson, Tony Hadley of Spandau Ballet, Man Like Me, Daisy Dares You, Kissy Sell Out, Tribes, Ollie Wride and The Horrors performed at the event. The event raised more than £8,000 for charities Mind and Campaign Against Living Miserably (CALM). Faris Badwan of The Horrors also dedicated his side-project Cat's Eyes' debut album Cat's Eyes to Haddon's memory.

== Discography ==
=== Album ===
List of albums, with selected details and chart positions
Title	Album details	Peak chart positions
Title	Album details	AUS
The Golden Year	Released: October 2010; Format: CD, digital download; Label: Cherry Pie (CPS 1021)	15

=== Singles ===
Year	Single	Peak chart positions					Certification	Album
Year	Single	UK	UK Ind.	AUS	BEL (FL)	NZ	Certification	Album
2009	"Dance the Way I Feel"	110	10	16	20	20	ARIA: Platinum	The Golden Year
2010	"These New Knights"	—	—	—	—	—		The Golden Year
2010	"Jackson's Last Stand"	—	—	79	—	—		The Golden Year
2010	"The Key"	—	—	—	—	—		The Golden Year
"—" denotes a release that did not chart or has not been released
