= Michael Paynter =

Australian singer-songwriter

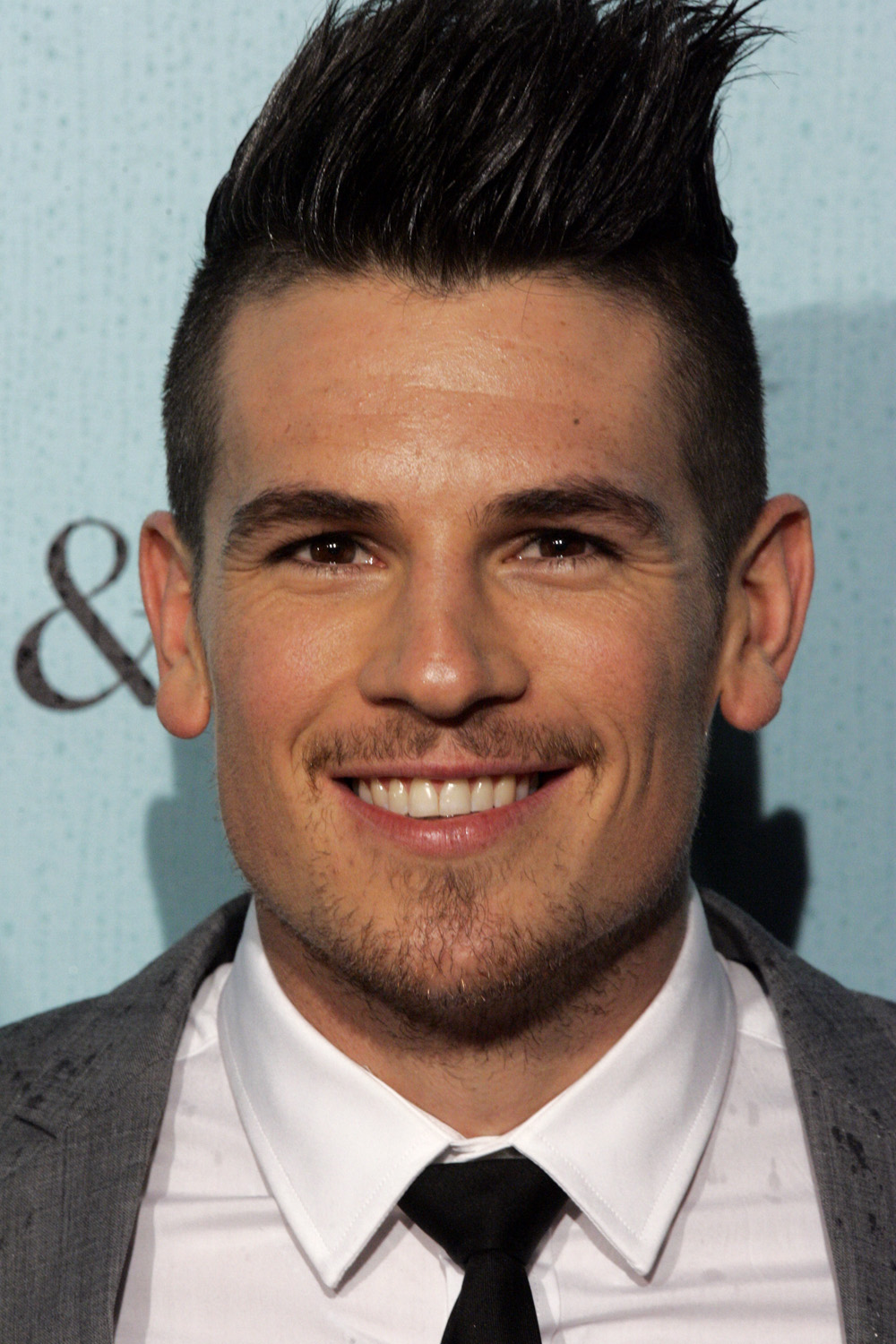
- Paynter at The Great Gatsby premiere in Sydney, Australia, 23 May 2013

Background information
- Born: 29 January 1986 (age 40); Melbourne, Victoria, Australia
- Genre: Pop rock
- Occupation: Singer-songwriter
- Instruments: Guitar, keyboard, drums, vocals
- Years active: 2007–present
- Label: Sony Music Australia
- Website: michaelpaynter.com

Michael Paynter (born 29 January 1986) is an Australian singer-songwriter. Paynter has released five singles, "Closer", "A Victim Song", "Love the Fall", "How Sweet It Is" and "Weary Stars". Paynter competed in the second season of The Voice Australia after being dropped from his record label and successfully made the Top 16, but did not advance to the Top 12.

== Early life ==
Paynter began playing instruments from a young age, playing the piano at the age of seven and learning guitar and drums by the time he was 15. At the age of 16, he began playing in touring bands across Australia. Regarding music, Paynter says that it "was always something I was going to do, because it fires up my soul like nothing else". He studied law for a year, but returned to music. Although Paynter liked law school and intends to return, he says the choice was either "tour the country and play guitar or study books" and the decision "was a no-brainer". Paynter says that playing drums makes him a better guitarist, playing guitar makes him a better keyboardist and playing all three makes him a better singer.

== Career ==
=== 2007–2012: Career launch ===
"They have big hooks. They are inspiring and powerful yet moving. If there's a thread through my songs, it's my positive spin on life. It's a wonderful experience and you need to have fun even while you're facing up to its challenges to get the best out of it. But if I can get people to pause after each track to think about what I'm singing, then I've done my job."
— Paynter regarding the songs on his album, This Welcome Diversion.

Paynter said the title of his planned debut album, This Welcome Diversion, was inspired by an advertisement in an inflight magazine; his music career is a diversion from his original career path, law. Paynter wrote or co-wrote all of the tracks on This Welcome Diversion. To record the album, he travelled to Los Angeles, where he worked with producer Matt Wallace and mixer Brian Paturalski. This Welcome Diversion featured performances by Josh Freese, Dorian Crozer, David Ryan Harris and John Fields.

The first single, "Closer", was described as "a soaring, hook-filled track about striving for better". Paynter wrote "Closer" in collaboration with Gary Clark and said that he fell in love with the song instantly. He said that "it works because the chords and rhythms are so simple. It's how people are, in their heads, never where they want to be whether it's a relationship or in a career. They're always wanting to be closer to the ideal." For the album, Paynter underwent a global four-month writing session, during which he also worked with Wally Gagel, Phil Buckle and Julian Hamilton of the Presets. The album's second single, "A Victim Song", was released on 15 November 2008 in Australia.

This Welcome Diversion was initially set to be released in 2008, but despite a set release date, was delayed until 2011. After the performance of singles "Closer" and "A Victim Song", which Paynter felt "didn't have the support of radio or a strong online presence", he and label Sony agreed to delay the album's release. Paynter began touring, serving as a supporting act for Vanessa Amorosi, Newton Faulkner, Seal and the Veronicas on their Revenge Is Sweeter tour. In between tours, Sony paid for songwriting trips to London and Los Angeles. This resulted in a free 10-track acoustic album, Money on Your Tongue, containing three cover songs and a version of "Closer", which were initially released as individual tracks across 10 weeks from late October 2009.

In June 2010, Paynter released the single "Love the Fall", which became the most added song to Australian radio in the first week of July and his first top-20 single on the ARIA Singles Chart. The single features background vocals from the Veronicas, who also appear in the music video. The physical release of the single, a five track EP, also included the song "Are You Alive?", which was used to promote the final episode of Lost. In July, Paynter returned to Los Angeles to finish his album, with a tentative 2011 release date. Paynter said of his career, "It's really been a blessing for me. I don't think many artists get to make their debut record twice. I think if most artists got the chance to do it again, they'd take it." In October 2010 Paynter supported Irish alternative rock band the Script for two shows in Australia.

Paynter also appeared on the Gypsy Heart Tour with Miley Cyrus as a special guest in Australia. He debuted his single "How Sweet It Is" on the tour.

In 2011, Paynter joined Icehouse as a touring member.

=== 2013–2016: Weary Stars and The Voice Australia ===
In April 2013, Paynter auditioned for Season 2 of The Voice Australia and after successfully having all four judges turn their chairs, chose Joel Madden as his coach. He successfully defeated Louise Roussety in the Battle Rounds with his rendition of "As Long as You Love Me" by Justin Bieber. He was saved by the public in part 2 of The Showdowns (for his performance of "The Horses" by Daryl Braithwaite), but failed to receive enough votes in the first Live Finals episode after performing "Locked Out of Heaven" by Bruno Mars, and was eliminated.

Performed	Song	Original artist	Result
Blind Audition	"Somewhere Only We Know"	Keane	Joined Team Joel
Battle Rounds	"As Long As You Love Me" (against Louise Roussety)	Justin Bieber	Winner
Showdowns	"The Horses"	Daryl Braithwaite	Public vote
Live Show Final, Part 1	"Locked Out of Heaven"	Bruno Mars	Eliminated

On 13 January 2014, Paynter released the single "Weary Stars". "Weary Stars" is the first single from Paynter's debut studio album of the same name. The album was released to iTunes on 31 January 2014.

Since 2011, Paynter has provided keyboards, guitar and vocals on Icehouse's tours. Besides backing vocals, he also sings "Man of Colours" at the live shows. Paynter spent most of 2015 supporting the Veronicas on their promotional tour and Delta Goodrem on her "Wings" promotion. He also co-wrote Reece Mastin's single "Even Angels Cry" from Mastin's 2015 album Change Colours.

Paynter joined Michael Delorenzis to create MSquared Productions in 2016, working as songwriters and producers.

=== 2017–present: Theatre roles and touring ===
In 2024, Paynter played the role of Jesus in the Sydney, Melbourne and Brisbane performances of Jesus Christ Superstar.

In December 2025, Paynter announced the Great Australian Songbook Tour in 2026 performing some of Australia's most iconic songs.

In September 2026 Paynter sang the Australian National Anthem a capella at the AFL Grand Final.

Commencing in November 2026, Paynter will portray John Farnham in the jukebox musical Whispering Jack: The John Farnham Musical for the Sydney Theatre Company.

== Discography ==
=== Albums ===
==== Studio albums ====
List of studio albums, with selected chart positions
Title	Album details	Peak chart positions
Title	Album details	AUS
Weary Stars	Released: 31 January 2014; Label: Self-released; Format: CD, digital download	78

==== Acoustic albums ====
Title	Album details
Money on Your Tongue	Released: 27 October 2009; Label: Self-released; Format: Digital download

=== Extended plays ===
Title	EP details
The Great Australian Songbook (Live) – Vol. 1	Released: 2 February 2026; Label: Self-released; Format: Digital download
The Great Australian Songbook (Live) – Vol. 2	Released: 10 March 2026; Label: Self-released; Format: Digital download
The Great Australian Songbook (Live) – Vol. 3	Released: 26 May 2026; Label: Self-released; Format: Digital download

=== Singles ===
List of singles, with selected chart positions
Title	Year	Peak chart positions	Certifications	Album
Title	Year	AUS	Certifications	Album
"Closer"	2008	61		Non-album singles
"A Victim Song"	2008	— (Note: "A Victim Song" did not enter the ARIA Singles Chart, but peaked at number 26 on the ARIA Physical Singles Chart.)		Non-album singles
"Love the Fall"	2010	19	ARIA: Gold	Weary Stars
"How Sweet It Is"	2011	—		Weary Stars
"Weary Stars"	2014	—		Weary Stars
"Gethsemane"	2026	—		Non-album single
"—" denotes a recording that did not chart.

==== As featured artist ====
List of singles as featured artist
Title	Year	Album
"Bring You Home" (Marcus Santoro featuring Michael Paynter)	2016	Non-album single

==== Promotional singles ====
List of promotional singles, with selected chart positions
Title	Year	Peak chart positions
Title	Year	AUS
"Somewhere Only We Know"	2013	—
"As Long as You Love Me"	2013	—
"The Horses"	2013	34
"Locked Out of Heaven"	2013	80
"—" denotes a recording that did not chart.

=== Other appearances ===
List of other appearances, showing artist and album
Title	Year	Artist	Album
"Invisible" (featuring Michael Paynter)	2014	Rachel Costanzo	Rachel Costanzo
"I Don't Believe You" (with Bachelor Girl)	2026	Bachelor Girl	Waiting for the Day: Artist Sessions

== Awards and nominations ==
=== APRA Music Awards ===
The APRA Music Awards were established by Australasian Performing Right Association (APRA) in 1982 to honour the achievements of songwriters and music composers, and to recognise their song writing skills, sales and airplay performance, by its members annually.

Year	Nominee / work	Award	Result	Ref.
2021	"A Little More" by Casey Barnes (Casey Barnes, Michael Delorenzis, Michael Paynter)	Most Performed Country Work	Nominated	
2025	"Good Things" by Kaylee Bell (Kaylee Bell, Michael De Lorenzis, Melanie Dyer, Michael Paynter)	Most Performed Country Work	Nominated	
2026	"Trouble" by Tori Darke & Jay Santilli (Victoria Darke, Jessica Santilli, Michael De Lorenzis, Michael Paynter)	Most Performed Country Work of the Year	Nominated	
2026	"Defiant" by Jimmy Barnes (Jimmy Barnes, Michael Paynter, Ben Rodgers)	Most Performed Rock Work	Nominated	
