= Love the Fall =

2010 single by Michael Paynter

Single by Michael Paynter

from the album Weary Stars
- Released: 18 June 2010
- Length: 3:03
- Label: Sony
- Songwriters: Michael Paynter; Gary Clark; Ferras Alqaisi
- Producer: Gary Clark

Michael Paynter singles chronology
| "A Victim Song" (2008) | "Love the Fall" (2010) | "How Sweet It Is" (2011) |

"Love the Fall" is a song by Australian singer Michael Paynter, released as his third single on 18 June 2010. The song was to feature on his debut album, This Welcome Diversion, before Paynter was dropped from Sony, so it was eventually released on his independently distributed 2014 album, Weary Stars, along with the B-sides "Are You Alive" and "Novocaine".

The song features backing vocals from Jessica Origliasso and Lisa Origliasso of Australian pop duo the Veronicas, whom Paynter met at the 2008 ARIA Music Awards and became good friends with. The single was released digitally on 18 June 2010 and as an EP on 9 July 2010. The five-track EP also includes the song "Are You Alive", which was used to promote the final episode of Lost.

== Music video ==
Paynter (top, left) with Lisa (top, right) and Jessica (bottom, left). And, the trio walking before the ending (bottom, right).

The music video for the song was released on 15 June 2010. The video initiates as Paynter driving along a deserted road at night where he meets a female dressed in white, Lisa Origliasso of The Veronicas. He is then tempted by her and follows her into the woods. Later on, a female dressed in black, Jessica Origliasso of The Veronicas, emerges from the bushes and follows Paynter and Lisa.

== Track listings ==
Digital single
| No. | Title | Length |
|---|---|---|
| 1. | "Love the Fall" | 3:03 |

EP
| No. | Title | Length |
|---|---|---|
| 1. | "Love the Fall" | 3:03 |
| 2. | "Are You Alive" | 4:21 |
| 3. | "Icarus" | 3:04 |
| 4. | "Lay My Armour Down" | 3:18 |
| 5. | "Novocaine" | 4:32 |

== Chart performance ==
"Love the Fall" became Paynter's first top 20 single to make it into the ARIA Singles Chart. Speaking of the single's success, Paynter said: "I didn't expect this reaction. I thought I had a great chance and a good song but I couldn't have guessed this. It makes every bit of brokenness and frustration and lonely travel worthwhile."

| Chart (2010) | Peak position |
|---|---|
| Australia (ARIA) | 19 |

== Release history ==
| Country | Date | Format | Label |
|---|---|---|---|
| Australia | 18 June 2010 | Digital download | Sony |
| Australia | 9 July 2010 | CD | Sony |

== See also ==
- "Closer" (Michael Paynter song)
