= Lying (Amy Meredith song) =

Single by Amy Meredith

from the album Restless
- Released: 23 April 2010
- Genre: Pop punk
- Length: 2:59
- Label: Sony Music Australia
- Songwriter(s): Christian Lo Russo, Joel Chapman, Robert Conley

Amy Meredith singles chronology
"Pornstar" (2009)	"Lying" (2010)	"Young At Heart" (2010)

Music video
- "Lying" on YouTube

"Lying" is the second single released from Australian band Amy Meredith's debut album, Restless. The single was written by Christian Lo Russo, Joel Chapman and Robert Conley and was produced by Robert Conley and Brian Paturalski. It was released digitally on 23 April 2010 and physically on 18 June 2010 "Lying" debuted on the ARIA Singles Chart at number 27, before reaching its highest peak to date at number 10 in its fourth week, making it their only top ten single on the charts. It spent five weeks in the ARIA top twenty and 14 weeks in the top 50 and gained platinum accreditation. On other Australian charts, the single has peaked at number 2 on the Australian Singles Chart (chart only for Australian origin), at number 12 on the ARIA Digital Tracks Chart and has reached number 1 on the ARIA Physical Singles Chart.

== Charts ==
=== Weekly charts ===
Chart (2010)	Peak position
ARIA Singles Chart	10
Australian Singles Chart	2
ARIA Physical Singles Chart	1
ARIA Digital Tracks Chart	12

=== Year-end charts ===
Chart (2010)	Position
Australian Singles Chart	92

== Certifications ==
Country	Certifications
Australia (ARIA)	ARIA: Platinum

== Track listings ==
CD single

1. "Lying"
2. "Pornstar (live)"

Digital

1. "Lying" — 2:59
2. "Shock Me" — 3:03

== Release history ==
Country	Date	Format	Label
Australia	23 April 2010	Digital download	Sony Music Australia
Australia	18 June 2010	CD single	Sony Music Australia
