= Half of My Heart =

Single by John Mayer featuring Taylor Swift

from the album Battle Studies
- Released: June 21, 2010
- Recorded: 2009
- Studio: Battle Studios Studios (Calabasas, CA); Capitol Studios (Los Angeles, CA); The Village Recorder (Los Angeles, CA)
- Length: 4:10 (album version); 3:52 (pop mix)
- Label: Columbia; Big Machine
- Songwriter: John Mayer
- Producers: John Mayer; Steve Jordan

John Mayer singles chronology
"Heartbreak Warfare" (2009)	"Half of My Heart" (2010)	"Perfectly Lonely" (2010)

Taylor Swift singles chronology
"Today Was a Fairytale" (2010)	"Half of My Heart" (2010)	"Mine" (2010)

Music video
- "Half of My Heart" on YouTube

"Half of My Heart" is a song by American singer-songwriter John Mayer featuring American singer-songwriter Taylor Swift. It is the third single from Mayer's 2009 album, Battle Studies. Mayer was nominated for a Grammy Award for Best Male Pop Vocal Performance in 2011 for his solo version of the song.

== Music and lyrics ==
The lyrics of "Half of My Heart" are sung by both Mayer and Swift; Swift sings with Mayer in the chorus and in the song's bridge. The lyrics are about the duo, with half of their hearts saying they should continue to love each other, although the other half says they are not each other's true love, and cannot keep loving each other.

Mayer "tweeted" about wanting to record the song with Swift in March 2009: "Waking up to this song idea that won't leave my head. 3 days straight now. That means it's good enough to finish," he wrote. "It's called 'Half of My Heart' and I want to sing it with Taylor Swift. She would make a killer Stevie Nicks in contrast to my Tom Petty of a song."

In an interview for the television special John Mayer: On the Record with Fuse (which aired only on Fuse), Mayer's interviewer asked why the singer chose Swift to duet with, since she was only 19 years old, and Mayer was 32. He responded by saying that he was not putting her on the album just to sell more copies for die-hard fans of Taylor Swift that might just get the album for that song.

A new version of the song was made which does not feature Swift. It also features different instrumentation. An alternate edit of this version was set to the music video, and does feature Swift, although the video does not. This version was released as the "Pop Mix" on iTunes and Amazon.

The black acoustic guitar Mayer uses in the official video is a Martin 000-ECHF Belezza Nera.

== Chart performance ==
"Half of My Heart" debuted at number 29 on the Billboard Hot Adult Top 40 Tracks chart on the issue date of May 8, 2010. This makes John Mayer's 14th appearance on that chart. The song also debuted at number 25 on the Billboard Hot 100 upon the release of Mayer's album Battle Studies. It fell off the Hot 100 within two weeks; however, upon its release as a single it re-entered the chart at number 88 and reached number 34. So far, it is Mayer's last single to reach the top 40 of the Billboard Hot 100, though he has made appearances outside of the top 40 since.

== Credits and personnel ==
- John Mayer – vocals, songwriter, producer, guitars
- Taylor Swift – featured vocals
- Steve Jordan – producer, drums
- Pino Palladino – bass
- Waddy Wachtel – acoustic guitars

== Charts ==
=== Weekly charts ===
Weekly chart performance for "Half of My Heart"
Chart (2009–2010)	Peak position
Australia (ARIA)	71
Canada Hot 100 (Billboard)	53
Netherlands (Dutch Top 40)	15
Netherlands (Single Top 100)	40
US Billboard Hot 100	25
US Adult Contemporary (Billboard)	7
US Adult Pop Airplay (Billboard)	2
US Pop Airplay (Billboard)	22
US Hot Rock & Alternative Songs (Billboard)	44
US Rock & Alternative Airplay (Billboard)	44

=== Year-end charts ===
Year-end chart performance for "Half of My Heart"
Chart (2010)	Position
Netherlands (Dutch Top 40)	74
US Adult Contemporary (Billboard)	16
US Adult Top 40 (Billboard)	14

== Certifications ==
Certifications for "Half of My Heart"
Region	Certification	Certified units/sales
Australia (ARIA)	Gold	35,000^{‡}
Denmark (IFPI Danmark)	Gold	45,000^{‡}
New Zealand (RMNZ)	Gold	15,000^{‡}
United States (RIAA)	Platinum	1,000,000^{‡}
^{‡} Sales+streaming figures based on certification alone.

== Release history ==
Release dates and formats for "Half of My Heart"
Region	Date	Format	Label(s)	Ref.
United States	June 21, 2010	Mainstream airplay	Columbia	
