= Amy Meredith =

Australian pop rock band

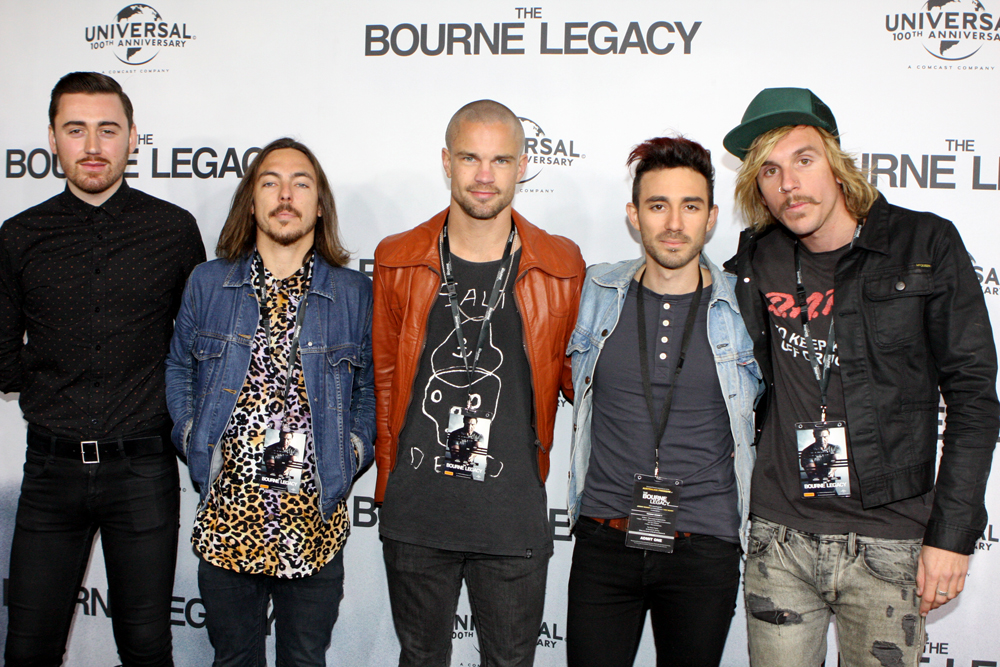
- Amy Meredith at The Bourne Legacy Australian premiere in August 2012.

Background information
- Origin: Sydney, New South Wales, Australia
- Genres: Pop, pop rock
- Years active: 2006–2013
- Past members: Christian Lo Russo; Joel Chapman; Wade Osborn; Cameron Laing; Kosta Theodosis; Matt Johnson; Elliot Hammond
- Website: www.amymeredith.com

Amy Meredith were an Australian pop band who released a self-titled EP in 2008. In 2009, having already been dropped from their label Tsubi/Ksubi, Amy Meredith signed a deal with Sony Music Australia, and released their debut single Pornstar. Much later, in March 2010, Amy Meredith released their second single, Lying, which peaked at No. 10, making it their only top 10 single. Their debut album, Restless was released on 2 July 2010 and reached No. 8 on the ARIA Albums Chart. The album was met with extremely negative reviews and shortly afterwards Sony terminated their deal with the band, so Amy Meredith turned to Vector Management for a distribution deal.

In 2013, with no label, Amy Meredith tried to release their second album, Maps following a crowd funding effort to raise the required money, however the album was not a success and failed to produce any charted singles. Since its release the band have been inactive, and their Facebook page has displayed "new album out September" since 2013.

== Discography ==
=== Studio albums ===
Year	Album details	Peak chart positions AUS
2010	Restless: Released: 2 July 2010; Label: Sony Music Australia; Formats: CD, digital download	8
2013	Maps: Released: 2013; Formats: Digital download	—

=== Extended plays ===
Year	Album details
2008	Amy Meredith EP: Released: 26 August 2008; Label: Scorpio; Format: CD, digital download

=== Singles ===
Year	Song	Chart positions AUS	Certifications	Album
2009	"Pornstar"	65		Restless
2010	"Lying"	10	AUS: Platinum	Restless
2010	"Young at Heart"	58		Restless
2010	"Faded White Dress"	—		Restless
2011	"Pick Up Your Tricks"	—		Maps
2012	"Fun"	—		Maps

=== Music videos ===
Year	Title	Director
2009	"Pornstar"	—
2010	"Lying"	Mark Alston
2010	"Young at Heart"	Mark Alston
2010	"Faded White Dress"	Mikey Hamer
2011	"Pick Up Your Tricks"	
2013	"Wake Me Up"	Alyson Rothwell

== Award nominations ==
Year	Type	Award	Result	Lost To
2010	Nickelodeon Australian Kids' Choice Awards 2010	Fresh Aussie Musos	Nominated	Cody Simpson
2010	ARIA Music Awards	Breakthrough Artist (Restless)	Nominated	Washington
2010	Channel V Australia	Oz Artist Award 2010 (Restless)	Nominated	Short Stack
2011	APRA	Rock Work of the Year (Lying)	Nominated	Jet
