= Who Says (John Mayer song) =

Single by John Mayer

from the album Battle Studies
- Released: October 13, 2009
- Recorded: 2009
- Genre: Acoustic pop
- Length: 2:59
- Label: Aware Records; Columbia; Sony
- Songwriter: John Mayer
- Producers: John Mayer; Steve Jordan

John Mayer singles chronology
"Free Fallin'" (2007)	"Who Says" (2009)	"Heartbreak Warfare" (2009)

"Who Says" is the thirteenth single released by American singer-songwriter John Mayer, and the first to be released from his fourth studio album, Battle Studies. It is Mayer's first studio recorded single release since "Say" in 2007. On September 25, 2009, "Who Says" was released on John Mayer's official website.

== Music video ==
The song's music video shows images of Mayer clubbing and dining out at night-time paired with scenes of him alone in his apartment, cleaning up and noodling on his guitar. Referencing the video, Leah Greenblatt of Entertainment Weekly asked "Who says the life of a rock star—sexy entourage, late-night pool parties, nubile young things dancing on banquettes—is just a mask for acoustic ennui? John Mayer, that's who," and gave the video a "B".

== Reception ==
=== Critical ===
Critical reception of "Who Says" was mixed; though most praised the song musically, some were skeptical of Mayer's explicit reference to drug use. Crystal Bell of Billboard magazine gave a favorable review from the song, saying, "'Who Says' balances Mayer's signature velvety tone with a more stripped-down, folk-inspired arrangement." She added, "Mayer may not be speaking in grandiose terms about changing the world or marveling over a woman's beauty, but maybe that's the point." Leah Greenblatt of Entertainment Weekly said of the single "Mayer channels Cat Stevens, Jason Mraz, and every camp counselor you ever had on this soft-rockin' celebration of women, wild times, and getting stoned." and gave the song a "B".

=== Commercial ===
On the week ending October 31, 2009, "Who Says" debuted at No. 17 on the Billboard Hot 100, making it his sixth and final top twenty hit and fourth highest-charting single on the Hot 100 to date. However, it also marks his lowest-charting single to date on the Billboard Adult Top 40 chart, peaking at No. 19, thus snapping a recent streak of five consecutive singles to reach the Top Ten on the format. By the week ending November 21, 2009, the song had reached number one on Billboard's Triple A chart. With this single, Mayer tied Jack Johnson for most Triple A number ones (six) among male artists.

In Australia, "Who Says" peaked at No. 31 on the ARIA Singles Charts and is certified gold for sales of 35,000 copies.

=== Charts ===
Chart (2009–2010)	Peak position
Australia (ARIA)	31
Canada Hot 100 (Billboard)	24
Denmark (Tracklisten)	8
Japan Hot 100 (Billboard)	51
Netherlands (Dutch Top 40)	18
Netherlands (Single Top 100)	13
Norway (VG-lista)	2
Sweden (Sverigetopplistan)	10
US Billboard Hot 100	17
US Adult Alternative Airplay (Billboard)	1
US Adult Pop Airplay (Billboard)	19
US Hot Rock & Alternative Songs (Billboard)	34
US Rock & Alternative Airplay (Billboard)	34

=== Year-end charts ===
Chart (2010)	Position
Sweden (Sverigetopplistan)	91

== Certifications ==
Region	Certification	Certified units/sales
Australia (ARIA)	Platinum	70,000^{‡}
Denmark (IFPI Danmark)	Platinum	90,000^{‡}
New Zealand (RMNZ)	Gold	15,000^{‡}
United States (RIAA)	Platinum	1,000,000^{^}
^{^} Shipments figures based on certification alone.^{‡} Sales+streaming figures based on certification alone.

== Controversy ==
The song's opening line ("Who says I can't get stoned?") has been taken to refer to cannabis intoxication. Rolling Stone published this quote from Mayer on his take on the line, indicating that this is a simplistic interpretation: "When I sing it, I do not think about marijuana — I think about walking around your house naked with a guitar. It's about being in control of the pleasure in your life."

== Personnel ==
- John Mayer – vocals, guitars, record producer
- Steve Jordan – drums, production
- Pino Palladino – bass
- Ian McLagan – pump organ, celeste
