= Kevin Leahy (musician) =

American drummer

- Born: March 21, 1974 (age 52)
- Occupation: Drummer
- Years active: 1998 – present
- Website: www.kevinleahy.com

Kevin Leahy (born March 21, 1974) is a drummer/percussionist who has recorded and performed with Shawn Mullins, Billy Pilgrim, BoDeans, Jennifer Nettles, Ellis Paul and other American folk rock artists. He studied classical percussion at the Manhattan School of Music and Indiana University School of Music (now Jacobs School of Music), where he was a student of Kenny Aronoff. While studying at Indiana University, Leahy played in the bands; Flattus, Fambooey, and Hipmotize. He is a member of the band Yonder Orphans.

== Discography ==
- Andrew Hyra Spill (1998)
- Shawn Mullins Soul's Core (1998)
- Bloodkin Out of State Plates (1999)
- Ellis Paul Sweet Mistakes (2001)
- Shawn Mullins Essential Shawn Mullins (2003)
- BoDeans Resolution (2004)
- Shawn Mullins 9th Ward Pickin Parlor (2006)

== Music videos ==
- Shawn Mullins - Lullaby (1998)
- Shawn Mullins - Shimmer (1999)

== Gear ==
- Ludwig drums
- Vic Firth drum sticks
- Zildjian cymbals
- Musser marimba & vibraphone
