= Max Gomez (musician) =

American singer-songwriter and musician

- Origin: Taos, New Mexico
- Genres: Americana, country, folk
- Occupations: musician, singer-songwriter
- Instruments: Vocals, guitar
- Years active: 2010–present
- Labels: Brigadoon Records, New West
- Website: maxgomezmusic.com

Max Gomez is an American singer-songwriter and musician based in Taos, New Mexico. He has been compared to Jackson Browne and John Prine because of his seasoned blend of Americana and folk.

== Biography ==
Gomez's father is of Portuguese and Spanish descent. His mother is of Scottish and Irish ancestry. He grew up in the mountains of northern New Mexico. The youngest of five brothers, Gomez spent his childhood fly fishing in New Mexico and exploring the mountains of Kansas where his parents own a farm. At 18 Gomez moved to Los Angeles to pursue his career in music. Gomez also co-founded and produces the annual Red River Folk Festival in Red River, New Mexico which hosts artists like James McMurtry, The Secret Sisters, Shannon McNally, and Jim Lauderdale, and Robert Mirabal.

== Music career ==
As a child, Gomez was influenced by the country and blues sounds of Johnny Cash and Big Bill Broonzy. After getting a guitar as a Christmas present when he was 10 years old, Gomez started performing in local bars throughout New Mexico. Gomez was noticed by Shawn Mullins after sending Mullins some of his music through Myspace. Mullins and Gomez collaborated, co-writing a handful of songs that would appear on Mullins' next two albums. They also toured the U.S. together as Gomez built up a fan base by opening for Mullins. Eventually, Gomez secured a record deal with Nashville-based label New West Records and recorded his first album with producer Jeff Trott. Rule The World put Gomez on the charts, Esquire naming the title track one of the top 10 "Best New Songs" at the time. In 2016 Gomez reunited with A&R rep Gary Briggs (Brigadoon Records) to release his second album Me & Joe, produced by Grammy Award-winning engineer and producer Jim Scott.

Gomez has also performed with hundreds of other Americana artists including Shawn Mullins, James McMurtry, Buddy Miller, Jim Lauderdale, Patty Griffin, and John Hiatt.

== Discography ==
=== Albums ===
Title	Album details	Peak chart positions	
Title	Album details	US Heat	US Folk
Rule The World	Release date: January 22, 2013; Label: New West Records; Formats: CD, digital download, vinyl		
Me & Joe (EP)	Release date: September 22, 2017; Label: Brigadoon Records; Formats: CD, digital download, vinyl	32	

=== Singles ===
Year	Single	Album
2013	"Rule The World"	Rule The Word
2013	"Run From You	Rule The Word
2017	"Make It Me"	Me & Joe
2017	"Joe"	Me & Joe

=== Music videos ===
Year	Video	Director
2013	"Run From You"	Keifer Sutherland
2017	"Make It Me"	

=== Guest appearances ===
Year	Song	Artist	Album	Notes
2010	"Love Will Find a Way"	Shawn Mullins	Light You Up	Co-writer
2010	"I Knew A Girl"	Shawn Mullins	Light You Up	Co-writer
2015	"Roll on By"	Shawn Mullins	My Stupid Heart	Co-writer
