= GEB =

Geb is an Egyptian god.

The GEB or Geb may also refer to:

== Education ==
- Games and Economic Behavior, a scholarly journal
- Gödel, Escher, Bach, a book by Douglas Hofstadter
- Guiding Eyes for the Blind, an American guide dog training school

== Media ==
- Golden Eagle Band of the University of North Georgia
- Golden Eagle Broadcasting, an American television network
- Gods Eater Burst, a re-release version of God Eater

== Other Uses ==
- Haile Gebrselassie (born 1973), Ethiopian long-distance runner
