= Find a Door =

Studio album by Pete Droge
- Released: 1996
- Genre: Rock
- Label: American
- Producer: Brendan O'Brien

Pete Droge chronology
Necktie Second (1994)	Find a Door (1996)	Spacey and Shakin (1998)

Find a Door is an album by the American musician Pete Droge (credited to Pete Droge & the Sinners), released in 1996. Droge supported the album by touring with the 1996 H.O.R.D.E. Festival.

== Production ==
Recorded in Atlanta, the album was produced by Brendan O'Brien, who also produced Droge's debut; the only other returning musician was Elaine Summers. Droge and O'Brien made use of a horn section on "Wolfgang". The album art contains a photo of the Howard Finster sculpture "Bicycle Tower". "Brakeman" dated to Droge's bar band days.

== Critical reception ==
Professional ratings
Review scores
Source	Rating
AllMusic	4/5 stars
Calgary Herald	3.5/5 stars
The Encyclopedia of Popular Music	2/5 stars
Entertainment Weekly	B+
The Indianapolis Star	3/4 stars
Los Angeles Times	3/4 stars
MusicHound Folk: The Essential Album Guide	4/5 stars

Entertainment Weekly opined that Droge "often sounds like a poor man’s Petty, but that’s far from the worst sin a songwriter can commit." The Los Angeles Times wrote that Droge "delivers these tales with droll understatement that accents a certain cynicism, à la John Hiatt or Randy Newman." The Indianapolis Star thought that "the tuneful Find a Door can be taken as a push to revive grass-roots rock or a testament to all that's good about it." Rolling Stone considered that "the strength of Droge's personal conviction emphasizes what is true rather than merely tried and makes Find a Door surprisingly rich and moving." The Ottawa Citizen deemed it "an unknown masterpiece," writing that "on 'Wolfgang', Droge cranks out the rollicking sort of love song that the Travelling Wilburys attempted to write, but couldn't."

AllMusic called the album "excellent," writing that "O'Brien perfectly captures the band's loose sound by putting the snare, cymbals, guitars, and Droge's voice way up at the forefront of the album's mix."

== Track listing ==
No.	Title	Length
1.	"Mr. Jade"
2.	"Wolfgang"
3.	"It Doesn't Have to Be That Way"
4.	"Dear Diane"
5.	"Brakeman"
6.	"You Should Be Running"
7.	"That Ain't Right"
8.	"Find a Door"
9.	"Out with You"
10.	"Sooner or Later"
11.	"Lord is Busy"

== Personnel ==
- Pete Droge – vocals, guitar
- Dave Hull – bass
- Dan McCarroll – drums
- Peter Stroud – guitar
- Elaine Summers – vocals, percussion
- Rev. Oliver Wells – piano
