= Ninth Ward (disambiguation) =

The 9th Ward of New Orleans is a distinctive region of New Orleans, Louisiana.

9th Ward, Ninth Ward, or Ward 9 may also refer to:

- 9th Ward Pickin Parlor, a 2006 studio album by Shawn Mullins
- Lower Ninth Ward, a neighborhood of the city of New Orleans, Louisiana, United States
- Ninth Ward, a 2010 novel by Jewell Parker Rhodes
- Prince George's County, Maryland (nickname: "Ward 9"), a county in the U.S. state of Maryland
- Ward 9, St. Louis City, an aldermanic ward in St. Louis, Missouri
- Knoxdale-Merivale Ward, Ottawa (also known as Ward 9)
- Ward 9 Davenport, a Ward in Toronto
- 9th ward, Chicago, an aldermanic ward in Chicago
