= Billy Steinberg =

American songwriter (1950–2026)

- Steinberg c. 2010s

Background information
- Born: William Endfield Steinberg; February 26, 1950; Fresno, California, U.S.
- Died: February 16, 2026 (aged 75) Los Angeles, California, U.S.
- Occupations: Songwriter; musician; record producer
- Years active: 1980–2026

William Endfield Steinberg (February 26, 1950 – February 16, 2026) was an American songwriter. He achieved his greatest success in the 1980s with songwriting partner Tom Kelly, together they wrote or co-wrote the No. 1 hits "Like a Virgin" by Madonna (1984), "True Colors" by Cyndi Lauper (1986), "Alone" (covered by Heart in 1987), "So Emotional" by Whitney Houston (1987) and "Eternal Flame" (co-written with Susanna Hoffs and recorded by the Bangles in 1989). Steinberg and Kelly also wrote or co-wrote the hit songs "I Drove All Night" (recorded by various artists, initially recorded by Roy Orbison in 1987 but first released by Lauper in 1989), "I Touch Myself" by Divinyls (1990) and "I'll Stand by You" by The Pretenders (1994).

After Kelly retired from music in the 1990s, Steinberg collaborated with other songwriters. With Rick Nowels and Marie-Claire D'Ubaldo he wrote the hit songs "Falling into You" (covered by Celine Dion) and "One & One". He wrote several songs with Josh Alexander, including "All About Us" and "Fly On The Wall" by t.A.T.u. (2005), "Too Little Too Late" by JoJo (2006), "Over It" by Katharine McPhee (2007), and "Give Your Heart a Break" by Demi Lovato (2012).

== Life and career ==
=== Early life ===
William Endfield Steinberg was born on February 26, 1950, in Fresno, California, and moved to Palm Springs when he was 12. He worked there in his father's table grape business. His father, Lionel Steinberg, ran the David Freedman Company, the largest grape grower in the Coachella Valley. Billy Steinberg attended Cate School in Carpinteria, California, and Bard College in Annandale-on-Hudson, New York. Steinberg was Jewish.

=== Music career ===
In his mid-20s, he formed the group Billy Thermal, which eventually signed to Richard Perry's Planet Records. Their breakthrough occurred in 1980 when Linda Ronstadt heard their album and decided to record their song "How Do I Make You?" for her 1980 Mad Love album. The album went to the top three on the charts and went platinum, and Ronstadt's version of their song reached the top 10.

Pat Benatar, on her 1980 album Crimes of Passion, covered another Billy Thermal song, "I'm Gonna Follow You". In 1981. Steinberg wrote "Precious Time", which became the title track for Benatar's album Precious Time. Also in 1981, he began writing with Tom Kelly, who had written another song ("Fire and Ice") on the album for Benatar. When the song "Like a Virgin" was played for Warner Bros., executives thought it would be perfect for Madonna. Madonna's version of the song was No. 1 for six weeks in the United States in 1984. It became a worldwide hit and was the title track for her number one album. Steinberg described his inspiration for the song as the elation he felt in a new relationship after a difficult breakup.

The success of the partnership (Kelly and Steinberg) continued with more number one singles, "True Colors" (recorded by Cyndi Lauper), "So Emotional" (by Whitney Houston), "Eternal Flame" (co-written with Susanna Hoffs and recorded by the Bangles), and "Alone" (by Heart). Their other hits include "In Your Room" (co-written with Susanna Hoffs and recorded by the Bangles), 'Spirit of Love' (by Laura Branigan), "I Drove All Night" (recorded by Roy Orbison, Lauper, and Celine Dion), "I Touch Myself" (Divinyls), "Sex as a Weapon" (by Benatar), and "Look Me in the Heart" (by Tina Turner). They also wrote several songs with Chrissie Hynde of the Pretenders, including the top-10 single "I'll Stand by You". Artists including REO Speedwagon, Cheap Trick, Bette Midler, Belinda Carlisle, and Taylor Dayne (on her multi-platinum debut album Tell It to My Heart), also recorded their songs.

In the mid-1990s, Steinberg began writing with Rick Nowels, who had established himself as a songwriter for artists such as Stevie Nicks and Carlisle. Their greatest success of the period was the Celine Dion recording of "Falling into You". In 1997, Steinberg co-wrote the track "One & One" with Nowels and Marie-Claire D'Ubaldo for Edyta Górniak, and the song became a hit in Europe and Asia. Górniak became the first Polish singer on the Music & Media's European Radio Top 50 airplay chart. Between 1997 and 1999, he wrote songs for Melanie C on her debut album Northern Star as well as the Corrs' second album Talk On Corners.

In 2005, Steinberg collaborated with Bay Area producer Josh Alexander in addition to Jessica and Lisa Origliasso of the Veronicas to write several tracks for the Veronicas' debut release, The Secret Life Of..., including the third single, "When It All Falls Apart". Steinberg and Alexander also wrote "All About Us", a hit for the Russian pop duo t.A.T.u. They wrote JoJo's 2006 single "Too Little Too Late" and Leigh Nash's "Nervous in the Light of Dawn" and "My Idea of Heaven", and Katharine McPhee's "Over It" in 2007. In 2008, Steinberg and Alexander wrote "Fly on the Wall" for t.A.T.u.'s album Happy Smiles. He wrote songs with Alexander on JoJo's scrapped album All I Want Is Everything.

With Alexander and Porcelain Black, he wrote the track "How Do You Love Someone?" for Ashley Tisdale's 2009 album Guilty Pleasure. In 2010, Steinberg and Alexander wrote "What Happened to Us" for Australian singer Jessica Mauboy for her album Get 'Em Girls. With Alexander and German producer Toby Gad, he wrote the 2011 song "Don't Hold Your Breath" for Nicole Scherzinger, and with Alexander and Rivers Cuomo he wrote the 2011 song "High Maintenance" for Miranda Cosgrove. Steinberg and Alexander also wrote and produced the hit song "Give Your Heart a Break" by Demi Lovato. Steinberg wrote the 2016 song "My Stupid Heart" for Tini Stoessel.

=== Bead collection ===
As an adult, Steinberg became fascinated by beads, amassing over 30 years a collection that included "ancient stone beads, Roman and Phoenician Period glass beads, Venetian trade beads, Edo-period glass ojime, and Chinese Boshan beads."

=== Death ===
Steinberg died from cancer at his home in Brentwood, Los Angeles, on February 16, 2026, at the age of 75. (Note: Many sources mislabel his age as "74".) Steinberg is survived by his wife, Trina; his sons, Ezra and Max; his sisters, Barbara and Mary; and his stepchildren, Raul and Carolina.

In a statement shared with The Independent, Ezra Steinberg said: “As a father, he passed down not only his love of music but his discipline, integrity and reverence for great songwriting. He believed in building things that last — in art, in relationships and in legacy.”

Cyndi Lauper noted that Steinberg had a difficult time with her alterations to "True Colors" but that afterward, he complimented her on her "exquisitely beautiful" version. Tom Kelly recalled his initial impression of Steinberg's work, "how good his lyrics were, that they were clever and catchy". Nancy Wilson praised his "wonderful spirit".

=== Appearances in film ===
Steinberg performed an acoustic version of "I Touch Myself" in an on camera interview in the documentary film Sticky: A (Self) Love Story.

=== Awards and honors ===
Steinberg was awarded a Golden Palm Star on the Palm Springs Walk of Stars in 2008. Steinberg and Kelly were inducted as a team into the Songwriters Hall of Fame in 2011.
