= The Essential Shawn Mullins =

Greatest hits album by Shawn Mullins
- Released: April 1, 2003
- Recorded: 1995–2000
- Genre: Folk rock, pop
- Length: 59.25
- Label: Sony
- Producer: Mitch Maketansky, Shawn Mullins, Julian Raymond

Shawn Mullins chronology
Beneath the Velvet Sun (2000)	The Essential Shawn Mullins (2003)	9th Ward Pickin Parlor (2006)

Professional ratings
Review scores
Source	Rating
Allmusic	3/5 stars

The Essential Shawn Mullins is a compilation album by American rock singer-songwriter Shawn Mullins which includes remastered songs mostly from his 2 previous folk-rock albums, Soul's Core and Beneath the Velvet Sun. The album was released on 1 April 2003 by Sony.

== Track listing ==
1. "Lullaby" (Mullins) - 5:30
2. "Lately" (ft. Michael Ward)(Mullins) - 4:26
3. "This Time/Last Time" (Mullins) - 2:59
4. "Canyons and Caverns" (Mullins) - 4:19
5. "The Gulf of Mexico" (Mullins) - 3:44
6. "Anchored in You" (Mullins) - 3:19
7. "Shimmer" (Mullins) - 4:08
8. "Everywhere I Go" (Mullins/Lawler) - 3:51
9. "Somethin' To Believe In" (ft. Shawn Colvin) (Mullins) - 3:43
10. "Santa Fe" (Mullins) - 3:49
11. "I Know" (ft. Shelby Lynne)(Mullins) - 4:00
12. "Joy Terrell Brown" (Mullins) - 2:45
13. "Lonesome, I Know You Too Well" (Mullins) - 3:10
14. "Border Song (Holy Moses)" (John/Taupin) - 3:22
15. "Lullaby" (Acoustic Version) (Mullins) - 5:05
