= The Thorns (album) =

2003 album by The Thorns

Studio album by The Thorns
- Released: May 20, 2003
- Recorded: 2002
- Genre: Rock
- Length: 43:01
- Label: Aware
- Producer: Brendan O'Brien

Professional ratings
Review scores
Source	Rating
AllMusic	3/5 stars
Rolling Stone	3/5 stars

The Thorns is the only studio album by rock supergroup The Thorns. Released by Aware Records in 2003, it was produced by Brendan O'Brien following songwriting sessions by the three members (Matthew Sweet, Pete Droge and Shawn Mullins) before they officially became a band.

== Track listing ==
All songs written by Shawn Mullins, Matthew Sweet and Pete Droge unless otherwise noted.

1. "Runaway Feeling" – 3:28
2. "I Can't Remember" – 3:31
3. "Blue" (Mark Olson, Gary Louris) – 2:53
4. "Think It Over" – 3:26
5. "Thorns" – 2:56
6. "No Blue Sky" (Mullins, Droge, Marshall Altman, Glen Phillips) – 4:38
7. "Now I Know" (Sweet) – 1:56
8. "Dragonfly" – 3:06
9. "Long, Sweet Summer Night" – 3:12
10. "I Told You" – 3:07
11. "Such a Shame" – 3:36
12. "I Set the World on Fire" – 3:04
13. "Among the Living" – 4:08

== Personnel ==
- Matthew Sweet – vocals, bass, acoustic and electric guitar, vihuela, baritone ukulele, marxophone, keyboards, percussion
- Shawn Mullins – vocals, acoustic and electric guitars, vihuela, keyboards, percussion, dulcimer
- Pete Droge – vocals, acoustic, electric and baritone guitar, ukelin, keyboards, cymbals
- Jim Keltner – drums
- Greg Leisz – mandola, mandolin, pedal steel, lap steel and 12-string electric guitar, electric dulcimer
- Brendan O'Brien – acoustic and electric guitar, bass, hurdy-gurdy, marxophone, bass harmonica, keyboards, percussion
- Roy Bittan – piano, electric piano
