= Beautiful Wreck =

"Beautiful Wreck" may refer to:

- "Beautiful Wreck", a song by Charlotte Church from One, 2012
- "Beautiful Wreck", a song by MØ from Forever Neverland, 2018
- "Beautiful Wreck", a song by Shawn Mullins from 9th Ward Pickin Parlor, 2006
