= Spacey and Shakin =

Studio album by Pete Droge
- Released: 1998
- Label: 57/Epic
- Producer: Brendan O'Brien

Pete Droge chronology
Find a Door (1996)	Spacey and Shakin (1998)	The Thorns (2003)

Spacey and Shakin is an album by the American musician Pete Droge, released in 1998. Droge supported the album with a North American tour that included shows opening for Edwin McCain. He was backed by his band, the Millionaires. Droge also participated in a "songwriters" tour, with John Doe, Steve Poltz, and Glen Phillips, nicknamed "Frasier Fair" in reference to Lilith Fair.

== Production ==
The album was produced by Brendan O'Brien; Droge briefly considered handling the production. Droge divided the album into sides. He added a Wurlitzer electronic piano to his heavier band sound, which was inspired by his reworking of songs on the Find a Door tour. "I Want to Go Away" is about a resident of a psychiatric hospital. "Motorkid" describes a trek to Neptune.

== Critical reception ==
Professional ratings
Review scores
Source	Rating
AllMusic	4/5 stars
The Atlanta Constitution	B+
Entertainment Weekly	A−
The Indianapolis Star	3/4 stars
MusicHound Folk: The Essential Album Guide	3.5/5 stars
The Province	3/5 stars
St. Paul Pioneer Press	2/4 stars

The Oregonian wrote: "More aggressive and much, much louder than his first two albums, the new work finds him moving boldly into the sonic territory of hard rock and psychedelia and the land of lyric abstraction, even as he drives it all home with his usual knack for great pop hooks." No Depression called the album "very much a Big Rock record with huge guitars, huger drums and vocals flanged to infinity." The Atlanta Constitution noted that "O'Brien adds a crunchy ruggedness to his catchy sound, anchoring Droge's more ethereal conceits in classic three-chord gravel." Stereo Review opined that Spacey and Shakin "may be his best faux Petty yet; stylistically, it's certainly the most varied."

Entertainment Weekly determined that, "although [Droge] doesn't define a unique sound, his stylistic searching makes for some pleasing music." The St. Paul Pioneer Press concluded that, "writing and singing in a style that crosses John Hiatt with Tom Petty, he's stuck in midgear for nine of these 11 songs." The Boston Globe stated that, "from the cyclonic guitars that swirl through the psychedelic title track to the Mott the Hoople-style shuffle of 'Motorkid', Droge crafts intriguing, exhilarating songs from a slightly warped perspective."

AllMusic deemed the album "a confident, well-crafted collection of rootsy, rocking songs that have strong hints of folk, adult alternative pop, and alt-country."

== Track listing ==
No.	Title	Length
1.	"Spacy and Shakin"
2.	"Please the Ghost"
3.	"Eyes on the Ceiling"
4.	"Motorkid"
5.	"Song Four"
6.	"Mile of Fence"
7.	"I Want to Go Away"
8.	"Blink of a Kiss"
9.	"Evan's Radio"
10.	"Walking by My Side"
11.	"Blindly"
