= Light You Up =

Studio album by Shawn Mullins
- Released: October 12, 2010
- Genre: Folk rock, pop, Americana
- Label: Vanguard
- Producer: Shawn Mullins & Gerry Hansen

Shawn Mullins chronology
| Live at the Variety Playhouse (2008) | Light You Up (2010) | My Stupid Heart (2015) |

Light You Up is the eighth studio album release from American rock singer-songwriter Shawn Mullins.

== Track listing ==
1. California
2. Light You Up
3. Murphy's Song
4. No Blue Sky
5. The Ghost of Johnny Cash
6. Tinseltown
7. I Knew a Girl
8. Catoosa County
9. You Make It Better
10. Can't Remember Summer
11. Love Will Find a Way
