= Beneath the Velvet Sun =

Studio album by Shawn Mullins
- Released: 24 October 2000
- Genre: Adult alternative, folk
- Label: Columbia

Shawn Mullins chronology
Soul's Core (1998)	Beneath the Velvet Sun (2000)	The Essential Shawn Mullins (2003)

Beneath the Velvet Sun is the fifth studio album by American rock singer-songwriter Shawn Mullins. It was released October 24, 2000.

Following the success of "Lullaby" from his previous album Soul's Core, Mullins landed a record deal with Columbia Records. The album included the single "Everywhere I Go", that he wrote about being away from his wife while on the road as a touring musician. The single did not match the previous success of "Lullaby", despite reaching third place on the Adult Alternative Airplay chart. The single included a music video, shot by David Hogan.

== Reception ==
Chris Willman of Entertainment Weekly gave Beneath the Velvet Sky a C rating, describing it as "Richard Marx filtered through Beck". William Rhulmann of AllMusic rated the album three out of five stars and called it "the uneven work of a talented artist who doesn't seem to trust the idiosyncratic approach that brought him to national attention enough to really let himself go."

Mullins himself has stated he doesn't see "Everywhere I Go" as one of his best work, also because he was sued over it by co-writer Mike Lawler from Mercury Nashville, when he refused to give Lawler an equal share and Lawler won in court. Because of this, he does not perform this song in live events.

== Track listing ==
1. Up All Night
2. Everywhere I Go
3. Amy's Eyes
4. Somethin' to Believe In
5. Valentine
6. Lonesome, I Know You Too Well
7. I Know
8. We Run
9. North on 95
10. Yellow Dog Song
11. Santa Fe
12. Hold On
13. Time
