= Necktie Second =

Studio album by Pete Droge
- Released: 1994
- Genre: Rock
- Label: American
- Producer: Brendan O'Brien

Pete Droge chronology
Necktie Second (1994)	Find a Door (1996)

Necktie Second is the debut album by Pete Droge.

== Critical reception ==
Professional ratings
Review scores
Source	Rating
AllMusic	3/5 stars

Trouser Press praised the album, writing that "Droge tips a retrospective nod to ’70s boy-rock on Necktie Second, updating the genre with a bit of humor on 'If You Don’t Love Me (I’ll Kill Myself)' and reviving the decade’s songwriting heyday with the slick folk-pop of 'Northern Bound Train.'”

== Track listing ==
1. "If You Don't Love Me (I'll Kill Myself)" – 3:34
2. "Northern Bound Train" – 4:38
3. "Straylin Street" – 4:40
4. "Fourth of July" – 6:04
5. "Faith in You" – 5:32
6. "Two Steppin Monkey" – 4:31
7. "Sunspot Stopwatch" – 4:21
8. "Hardest Thing to Do" – 5:27
9. "So I Am Over You" – 4:55
10. "Dog on a Chain" – 4:33
11. "Hampton Inn Room 306" – 3:27
