= The Thorns (band) =

US musical group

The Thorns were an American acoustic rock band formed in 2002 as a project of Matthew Sweet, Pete Droge, and Shawn Mullins.

The band toured the United States and Europe throughout 2003 in support of their eponymous debut album. The band toured supporting a number of acts, including The Jayhawks and The Dixie Chicks.

The band had scored radio airplay with their cover of The Jayhawks song "Blue", and their only album charted at #62 on the Billboard charts. The album was later reissued the following year with a second disc of acoustic re-recordings of the album.

That same year, the band was featured on the television series American Dreams performing a cover of the Beach Boys' "Warmth of the Sun". The band broke up in 2004 with each member resuming their solo careers.

The band's song "Among the Living" was featured in the 2019 Netflix series After Life.

== Discography ==
- The Thorns CD – Aware Records, 2003 – UK #68
