= Honeydew (album) =

Studio album by Shawn Mullins
- Released: March 11, 2008
- Genre: Folk rock, pop
- Label: Vanguard

Shawn Mullins chronology
9th Ward Pickin Parlor (2006)	Honeydew (2008)	Live at the Variety Playhouse (2008)

Professional ratings
Review scores
Source	Rating
PopMatters.com	6/10 stars

Honeydew is a studio album by American rock singer-songwriter Shawn Mullins. It was released in 2008 on Vanguard Records.

== Track listing ==
1. "All in My Head"
2. "Home"
3. "The Ballad of Kathryn Johnston"
4. "Homeless Joe"
5. "Leaving All Your Troubles Behind"
6. "Fraction of a Man"
7. "See That Train"
8. "For America"
9. "Cabbagetown"
10. "Nameless Faces"
11. "Song of the Self (Chapter 2)"
12. "Rewind the Years"
