= 9th Ward Pickin Parlor =

Studio album by Shawn Mullins
- Released: February 14, 2006
- Recorded: 2005
- Genre: Adult alternative
- Length: 55:44
- Label: Vanguard
- Producer: Shawn Mullins

Shawn Mullins chronology
Beneath the Velvet Sun (2000)	9th Ward Pickin Parlor (2006)	Honeydew (2008)

Professional ratings
Aggregate scores
Source	Rating
Metacritic	64/100
Review scores
Source	Rating
Allmusic	4/5 stars
Rolling Stone	2/5 stars

9th Ward Pickin Parlor is a 2006 studio album by American rock singer-songwriter Shawn Mullins, recorded in Atlanta and in New Orleans Ninth Ward before Hurricane Katrina. Singles include "Beautiful Wreck" and "Find Love."

== Background and recording ==
9th Ward Pickin' Parlor is named after the New Orleans recording studio where it was primarily recorded in April 2005. The Pickin' Parlor was a converted 100-year-old shotgun house owned by producer Mike West, located approximately one block from the city's Industrial Canal in the Ninth Ward. West had previously collaborated with Mullins on his earlier album Soul's Core, and Mullins sought the same raw, unpolished sound for the new project. Mullins described the recording approach as aiming for an "old school" vibe — no loops or samples, live instruments only, prioritizing overall performance feel over note-perfect takes.

The studio was destroyed when Hurricane Katrina struck New Orleans in August 2005, just four months after Mullins completed his recording sessions there. Following the disaster, the studio relocated to Lawrence, Kansas. The album was dedicated to the city of New Orleans and the victims of Hurricane Katrina.

The remaining tracks were recorded in Atlanta, with Mullins describing the overall album as "half acoustic and half small band."

== Music and style ==
The album spans a wide range of Americana-adjacent styles, including country, folk, rock, Celtic, and gospel. Lead single "Beautiful Wreck" was co-written with former Toad the Wet Sprocket frontman Glen Phillips and singer-songwriter Pete Droge, and carries a pronounced alt-country influence. Other notable tracks include the electrified blues of "Faith," the faintly Celtic "Cold Black Heart," and a closing cover of the traditional standard "House of the Rising Sun," intended as a tribute to New Orleans.

Mullins has cited Kris Kristofferson, James Taylor, and Neil Young as major influences. He noted that the album marked a departure from his more typical love songs into themes of hardship and struggle — drawn in part from his time spent in the Ninth Ward.

== Critical reception ==
Professional ratings
Aggregate scores
Source	Rating
Metacritic	64/100
Review scores
Source	Rating

The album received a Metacritic score of 64 out of 100 based on multiple professional reviews. Critics noted its stylistic range, with several describing it as among Mullins' most cohesive and diverse work, with particular praise for the ballads and his command of multiple Americana sub-genres. Slant Magazine called the album a sturdy and engaging collection, describing it as an oblique testament to resilience in the aftermath of Hurricane Katrina, and a "surprising delight." Uncut awarded it three out of five stars, praising Mullins' ability to bring grit and passion to his material, particularly on the closing "House of the Rising Sun."

== Track listing ==
1. "Blue As You"
2. "Beautiful Wreck"
3. "Cold Black Heart"
4. "Faith"
5. "Homemade Wine"
6. "Talkin' Goin' to Alaska Blues"
7. "We Could Go and Start Again"
8. "Kelly's Song"
9. "Find Love"
10. "All Fall Down"
11. "Lay Down Your Swords, Boys"
12. "Solitaire"
13. "House of the Rising Sun"
