= Golden Eagle Band =

Military marching band of the University of North Georgia

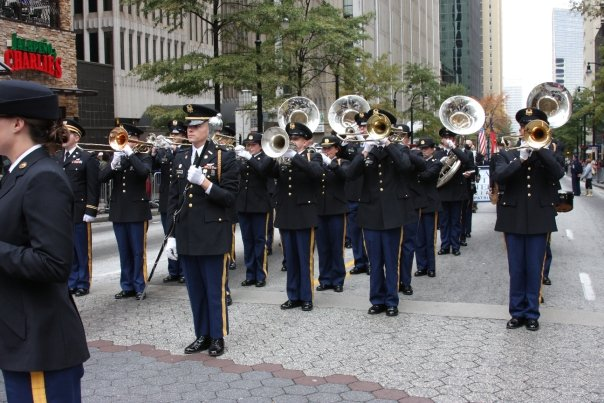
- Golden Eagle Band at Veteran's Day Parade, 2009
- Active: 1 January 1873; 153 years ago
- Country: United States of America
- Branch: United States Army
- Type: Military Band; Marching Band
- Role: Ceremonial duties
- Part of: UNG Corps of Cadets
- Main Headquarters: Dahlonega campus, University of North Georgia
- Nickname: GEB
- Mottos: Fly With Pride! Talons of Steel! Raise Hell!
- Colors: Blue and Gold

Commanders
- Officer-in-Command: Cadet Captain Wyatt Phillips
- Non Commissioned Officer In Command: Cadet 1st Sergeant Eliza Jane Barron
- Director and Military Advisor: Dr. Bart Walters

The Golden Eagle Band (GEB) is the official instrumental ensemble of the University of North Georgia's Corps of Cadets. It serves as one of the featured units at all Cadet Reviews and military ceremonies during the school year. The unit also regularly travels off-campus to perform in parades, festivals, and military ceremonies throughout the Southeast.

== History ==
The Golden Eagle Band of University of North Georgia is the oldest specialty unit on campus. It was created along with the founding of the college in 1873. Throughout the history of UNG the Golden Eagle Band has always been an integral part of the college's Corps of Cadets.

The Band's name has changed several times, been housed in many different locations, and has fluctuated in size throughout the years.

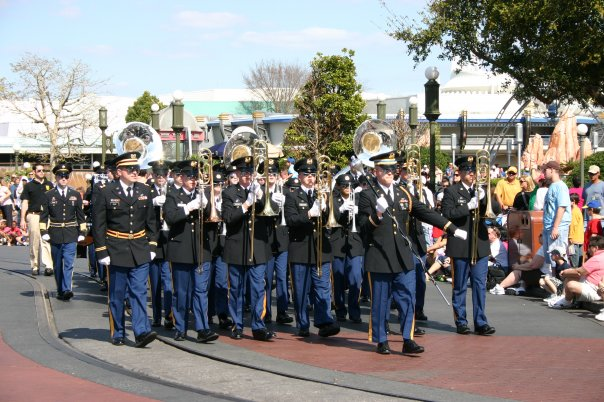
Golden Eagle Band at Disney's Music Days Parade 2009

In the early 1900s the Golden Eagle Band was known as the Boar's Head Brigade Band. At that time, the band lived and practiced in a building that was located at the current site of Young Hall. The Commandant of Cadets also lived with the band at this time. After WWII, the band moved to Barnes Hall and created a large Boar's Head to hang over the fireplace. Later, this same Boar's Head was presented to the college and now hangs in the student Great Room in the Student Center. While in Barnes Hall, the band was the largest it has ever been. This was partly due to the fact that the Commandant of Cadets would personally take people from other companies who knew how to play an instrument and place them in the band. The name of the band changed to the Tiger Band, and the director of the band wrote UNG's Alma Mater.

In 1969, the Band moved to their current residence at Sanford Hall but was forced to cut its numbers to accommodate to the living space. Another problem that the band faced during this growing phase was a lack of adequate places to practice. Starting in the Canteen, they eventually moved to the gym and Young Hall. They then moved to El Maguey, a local Mexican restaurant located on the square. It was at this time that the band painted it gold to show everyone who practiced there and who the restaurant supported.

In 1972, the unit finally changed its name to the Golden Eagle Band. The band's distinctive patch was designed in 1989 by Jasper, GA artist Mary Russell, mother of one of the cadets. At this time the Band had its own unique uniform, which consisted of a black helmet with a large golden eagle on it. At the end of this decade, the band moved once again to Gaillard Hall. Once situated there, they painted a mural on the walls of their wing and placed a gold brick in the wall to show everyone how much hard work they dedicated to the school. It was also at this time that the band's practice area changed once again to the newly constructed Nix Center in which they had their own practice room. During this time in the early 1990s the motto of the Golden Eagle Band was "Golden Eagles Fly With Pride!".

Due to the growing size of the Corps of Cadets, the band was forced to relocate back to Sanford hall in 2003. The band was there until the new barracks were constructed in 2010.

Also throughout its history, the Golden Eagle Band has produced many young leaders that are now serving the Army as second lieutenants in the Aviation, Engineer, Field Artillery, Armor, Medical Services, Infantry, and most recently Military Intelligence branches.

== Mission ==
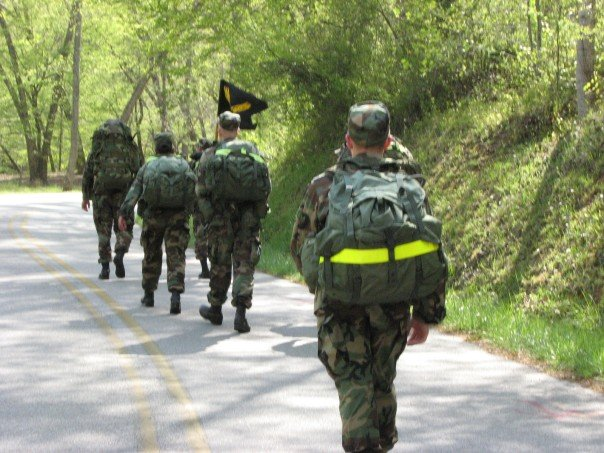
Golden Eagle Band participating in a 6 mile ruckmarch

The Golden Eagle Band's mission is to "provide quality musicianship, discipline, and leadership through both military and musical training. We set and maintain the highest standards to represent the University of North Georgia's Boar's Head Brigade."

Generally, participation in the Golden Eagle Band is open to anyone with a background in music. People who have previously played in high school bands are preferred, but this is not a requirement. Everything that a member of the GEB needs to know about performing in a military marching band is readily available to be taught by instructors and the student leadership.

The Golden Eagle Band is also an academic class that is worth one credit hour for each semester enrolled. Civilian students need only to register for the class during registration periods throughout the semester while participants in the Corps of Cadets can either request to be put in HHC and live with the GEB or live with one of the many line companies on campus and attend the class. However, living with the band is highly recommended.

Throughout the duration of their participation in the Golden Eagle Band, participants will be challenged in a variety of ways, which are not just limited to their abilities as a musician. They will be presented with unique challenges to develop themselves as individuals, as a member of a team, and be tested in their abilities of leadership. During the year, the Cadet members of the GEB participate in tactical training and leadership evaluation techniques and go on their own FTXs. Most of the time they are not able to participate in the regular Corps training periods because of scheduling conflicts with class and Band Camps.

Every fall semester the Golden Eagle Band conducts special training in which participants will be able to earn a spot inside the GEB "family". In the Spring semester these participants are able to participate in a more thorough examination of their knowledge, skills, and abilities in order to become a fully accepted and recognized member of the GEB.

== Scholarship and Award Opportunities ==
The bands at the University of North Georgia, including the Golden Eagle Band, offer a variety of scholarships to prospective students. One particular scholarship of interest to potential members of the GEB is the Roy E. Bottom Scholarship.

=== Roy E. Bottom Scholarship ===
This scholarship covers the entire regular academic year (spring and fall semesters). It is a one-year scholarship, but it may be re-awarded to the same recipient in subsequent years as the Director of Bands sees fit.

==== Student Eligibility ====
- Student must be a Georgia Resident as defined by UNG
- Student must be an undergraduate
- Student must be on full-time status at UNG each semester the scholarship is awarded (12hrs)
- In order to continue receiving the scholarship, the student must maintain a cumulative 2.5 GPA (incoming students may omit this)
- Student must be a participating member of the Golden Eagle Band as defined in the acceptance letter

==== Application Procedure ====
- Complete the full application including the essay section
- Complete an audition for the Director of Bands
- Complete an interview with the Commandant of Cadets and Director of Bands

== Leadership History ==
School Year	Commander	Executive Officer	Bandmaster
1873	?	?	?
1975-1976	C/CPT Arthur Gibbs	C/1LT John Douglas	C/MSG Paul Wingo
1976-1977	C/CPT James DePaz		C/MSG Bill Tew
1977-1978	C/CPT Andy Willis		C/MSG Vic Eilenfield
1978-1979	C/CPT Vic Eilenfield		C/MSG Mark Bynum
1979-1980	C/CPT Mark Bynum		C/MSG John Ford
1982-1983	C/CPT DON GRACE	C/1LT HERSCHEL COLLINS	
1986-1987	C/CPT Bruce Davis		C/MSG Mike Ammons
1987-1988	C/CPT Mike Ammons		
1988-1989	C/CPT Theresa Depew	C/1LT Doug Stover	C/MSG Shawn Mullins
1989-1990	C/CPT Drew Brown	C/1LT Shawn Mullins	C/MSG Mike Russell
1990-1991	C/CPT Mark Fiorentino	C/1LT Lee Sears	C/MSG Jim Asher
1991-1992	C/CPT Jim Asher	C/1LT Chet Thomas	C/MSG Scott Cooper
1992-1993	C/CPT Adrienne Adams	C/1LT Carlton Brown	
1993-1994	C/CPT Michael K Davis	C/1LT Michael Bearden	C/MSG Darren Smith & C/MSG Lee Greene
1994-1995	C/Cpt Darrin Smith	C/ 1LT Lee Greene	
2000-2001	C/CPT Andrew Banister	C/1LT Rob Lawerance	C/MSG Jay Howell
2001-2002	C/CPT Hugh Henry	C/1LT Otis Coles	C/MSG Dallas York
2002-2003	C/CPT Dallas York	C/1LT Wes Cannon	C/MSG Kyle Tafel
2003-2004	C/1LT Kyle Tafel	C/2LT Thomas Ellison	C/SFC Thomas Caylor
2008-2009	C/1LT Andrew Sparks		C/SFC Andrew Ivester
2009-2010	C/1LT Kelli Foley		C/MSG Jonathan Likovetz
2010-2011	C/2LT Jonathan Likovetz		C/SFC Neville Williams
2011-2012	C/2LT Neville Williams		C/SFC Ian Williams
2012-2013	C/2LT Neville Williams		
2013-2014	c/1LT Stephen Manderson	c/2LT Ian Williams	c/MSG Jessica Messer
2014-2015	c/1LT Jessica Messer		c/MSG Gavin Greif
2015-2016	c/1LT Gavin Greif		c/MSG Clare Tanner
2016-2017	c/1LT Gavin Greif		
2017-2018	c/1LT Jasmine Sanchez		c/SSG Jon Wooldridge
2018-2019	c/MSG Jon Wooldridge		c/SSG Megan Shockley
2019-2020	c/1LT Jon Wooldridge		c/MSG Rebecca Alfaro
2020-2021	c/1LT Jon Wooldridge	c/2LT Jacob Pressley	c/MSG Whitney Kenline
2021- 2022	c/1LT Jacob Pressley	c/CPT Mark Cordavado	
2022- 2023	c/1LT Anthony Stovall	c/2LT Colin Hathaway	
2023- 2024	c/1LT Matthew Hollowell		c/MSG Anna Brown
2024- 2025	c/1LT Matthew Hollowell	c/2LT Anna Brown	c/MSG Wyatt Phillips
2025- 2026	c/CPT Anna Brown	c/1LT Wyatt Phillips	c/1SGT Adam Conner
2026- 2027	c/CPT Wyatt Phillips	c/1LT Adam Conner	Specialist David Stratton, GA ARNG
