= Brendan O'Brien (music producer) =

American record producer (born 1960)

- Born: June 30, 1960 (age 66); San Diego, California, U.S.
- Occupations: Record producer; sound engineer
- Years active: 1985–present

Brendan O'Brien (born June 30, 1960) is an American record producer, mixer, and engineer. He has worked with many groups and artists during his career, such as AC/DC, Pearl Jam, The Offspring, Stone Temple Pilots, Soundgarden, Red Hot Chili Peppers, Bob Dylan, Rage Against the Machine, the Killers and Bruce Springsteen. O'Brien was also credited on many nu metal albums with such artists as Korn, Limp Bizkit, Incubus and Papa Roach.

== Career ==
Raised in Atlanta, O'Brien's career blossomed as a young guitarist with a local band by the name of Pranks, signed by what was then Century Artists Management. The management company had what many considered the best of Atlanta and the surrounding region in those days, including the likes of Mother's Finest, Ezra Pound and a dozen other "super-regional" acts. In the late 1970s, he moved on to writing, performing, and recording with the band Samurai Catfish.

O'Brien became a successful local engineer, considered to be the best person to make recordings in a few days on a modest budget such as $1,500. His studio career was propelled by the success of the first Black Crowes album, Shake Your Money Maker, which he engineered and for which he also performed guitar, bass, and "a potpourri of instruments". The following year he engineered and mixed the Red Hot Chili Peppers' breakthrough album Blood Sugar Sex Magik and produced and mixed Stone Temple Pilots' debut album Core the year after that. These two records launched his career as an in-demand producer, engineer and mixer working on multiple top-selling artists. He produced and mixed nearly the entire catalog of Stone Temple Pilots and Pearl Jam. Most of his productions were engineered by Nick DiDia, whom he worked with throughout most of his career.

O'Brien often engineered and recorded his own sessions with the help of various assistant engineers. A majority of the records that he produced and/or mixed were made at Southern Tracks Recording Studio near his home, in Atlanta, from the late 1980s until its closure.

In the mid-1990s, O'Brien became vice president of Epic Records and the Epic imprint 57 Records. He also played a Hammond organ for Bob Dylan's appearance on MTV Unplugged. In 1995, he joined Pearl Jam and Neil Young on keyboards for the Mirror Ball tour across Europe.

In 2002, O'Brien won a Grammy Award for Best Rock Album for his work on Bruce Springsteen's The Rising. In 2009, he was awarded the Grammy Award for Producer of the Year, Non-Classical. In 2015, he produced Higher Truth, the final release by Chris Cornell.

He produced the Italian bluesman artist Zucchero Fornaciari's 2016 album Black Cat and received production credits for track three of the 2017 EP Cold Dark Place by the progressive metal band Mastodon.

== Selected discography ==
Below is a selection of albums Brendan O'Brien has worked on as a producer, engineer, or mixer.

- The Coolies – Doug (producer) (1988)
- Kansas – In the Spirit of Things (engineer) (1988)
- Atlanta Rhythm Section – Truth in a Structured Form (engineer) (1989)
- Springhill – Southern Eulogy (producer, engineer, guitarist) (1989)
- Black Crowes – Shake Your Money Maker (engineer) (1990)
- Temple of the Dog – Temple of the Dog (2016 remix) (1991)
- Red Hot Chili Peppers – Blood Sugar Sex Magik (engineer, mixer) (1991)
- Johnny Law – Johnny Law (producer) (1991)
- Black Crowes – The Southern Harmony and Musical Companion (engineer) (1992)
- Jackyl – Jackyl (producer, engineer, mixer) (1992)
- The Jayhawks – Hollywood Town Hall (engineer, mixer) (1992)
- Stone Temple Pilots – Core (producer, mixer) (1992)
- Pearl Jam – Vs. (producer, engineer) (1993)
- Aerosmith – Get a Grip (mixer) (1993)
- Paul Westerberg – 14 Songs (mixer) (1993)
- King's X – Dogman (producer, mixer) (1994)
- Pearl Jam – Vitalogy (producer, engineer) (1994)
- Soundgarden – Superunknown (mixer) (1994)
- Stone Temple Pilots – Purple (producer) (1994)
- Pete Droge – Necktie Second (producer, mixer) (1994)
- Neil Young – Mirror Ball (producer) (1995)
- Matthew Sweet – 100% Fun (producer, mixer) (1995)
- Dan Baird – Buffalo Nickel (producer) (1996)
- Pearl Jam – No Code (producer, mixer) (1996)
- Stone Temple Pilots – Tiny Music... Songs from the Vatican Gift Shop (producer, mixer) (1996)
- Rage Against the Machine – Evil Empire (producer) (1996)
- Brad - Interiors (engineer, mixer) (1997)
- Michael Penn – Resigned (producer) (1997)
- Matthew Sweet – Blue Sky on Mars (producer) (1997)
- Pearl Jam – Yield (producer, mixer) (1998)
- Pete Droge – Spacey and Shakin (producer) (1998)
- Korn – Follow the Leader (mixer) (1998)
- Rage Against the Machine – The Battle of Los Angeles (producer, mixer) (1999)
- Limp Bizkit – Significant Other (mixer, songwriter) (1999)
- Stone Temple Pilots – No. 4 (producer, mixer) (1999)
- Korn – Issues (producer, mixer) (1999)
- Limp Bizkit – Chocolate Starfish and the Hot Dog Flavored Water (mixer) (2000)
- Lifehouse – No Name Face (mixer) (2000)
- The Offspring – Conspiracy of One (producer) (2000)
- Our Lady Peace - Spiritual Machines (mixer) (2000)
- Pearl Jam – Binaural (mixer) (2000)
- The Offspring – Defy You (producer) (2001)
- Train – Drops of Jupiter (producer, mixer) (2001)
- Papa Roach – Lovehatetragedy (producer) (2002)
- Pearl Jam – Riot Act (mixer) (2002)
- Bruce Springsteen – The Rising (producer) (2002)
- Train – My Private Nation (producer, mixer) (2003)
- The Offspring – Splinter (producer) (2003)
- Incubus – A Crow Left of the Murder... (producer, mixer) (2004)
- Trey Anastasio – Shine (producer, mixer) (2004)
- Audioslave – Out of Exile (mixer) (2005)
- Bruce Springsteen – Devils & Dust (producer, mixer) (2005)
- Train – For Me, It's You (producer, mixer) (2006)
- Audioslave – Revelations (producer, mixer) (2006)
- Incubus – Light Grenades (producer, mixer) (2006)
- The Nightwatchman – One Man Revolution (producer) (2007)
- Bruce Springsteen – Magic (producer, mixer) (2007)
- Velvet Revolver – Libertad (producer) (2007)
- The Nightwatchman – The Fabled City (producer) (2008)
- AC/DC – Black Ice (producer) (2008)
- Killswitch Engage – Killswitch Engage (producer) (2009)
- Mastodon – Crack the Skye (producer) (2009)
- Billy Talent – Billy Talent III (producer) (2009)
- Pearl Jam – Backspacer (producer) (2009)
- Anberlin – Dark Is the Way, Light Is a Place (Producer) (2010)
- The Nightwatchman – World Wide Rebel Songs (mixer) (2011)
- Incubus – If Not Now, When? (producer) (2011)
- Seether – Holding Onto Strings Better Left to Fray (producer) (2011)
- The Fray – Scars & Stories (producer) (2012)
- The Gaslight Anthem – Handwritten (producer) (2012)
- Third Day – Miracle (producer) (2012)
- The Killers – Battle Born (producer, engineer, mixer) (2012)
- My Chemical Romance – Conventional Weapons (2013)
- Pearl Jam – Lightning Bolt (producer, mixer) (2013)
- AC/DC – Rock or Bust (producer) (2014)
- Seether – Isolate and Medicate (producer) (2014)
- Bruce Springsteen – High Hopes (producer, mixer) (2014)
- Blackberry Smoke – Holding All the Roses (producer) (2015)
- Wakrat – Wakrat (engineer, mixer) (2016)
- Prophets of Rage – Prophets of Rage (producer, mixer) (2017)
- Mastodon – Emperor of Sand (producer) (2017)
- Chris Cornell – Chris Cornell (producer) (2018)
- AC/DC – Power Up (producer, mixing) (2020)
- My Morning Jacket – is (producer) (2024)
- Incubus – TBD (producer) (2025)
- The Format – Boycott Heaven (producer) (2026)
- Young the Giant – Victory Garden (producer) (2026)
