= Lullaby (Shawn Mullins song) =

1998 single by Shawn Mullins

Single by Shawn Mullins

from the album Soul's Core
- B-side: "The Gulf of Mexico"; "Changes"
- Released: August 17, 1998
- Studio: Orphan, Southern Living at Its Finest (Atlanta, Georgia)
- Length: 5:30 (album version); 4:32 (single version)
- Label: SMG; Columbia
- Songwriter: Shawn Mullins
- Producer: Shawn Mullins

Shawn Mullins singles chronology
"Lullaby" (1998)	"Shimmer" (1998)

"Lullaby" is a song by American rock singer Shawn Mullins from his fourth studio album, Soul's Core (1998). Written and produced by Mullins alone, the song is about a girl who wishes to escape from her elevated social status. The track was serviced to US radio in August 1998 and was later released commercially, backed with the B-sides "The Gulf of Mexico" and the UK-only "Changes". "Lullaby" is Mullins' most successful song, peaking at number seven on the US Billboard Hot 100 and topping three other Billboard charts. It also found success abroad, reaching number nine in the United Kingdom, number five in Australia, and number two in Canada.

== Content ==
According to AllMusic reviewer Shawn M. Haney, the song is about "a girl who is feeling depressed, crying out for a life away from her upbringing, a life full of Hollywood days and movie star-filled nights."

== Track listings ==
US 7-inch single

A. "Lullaby" – 5:30
B. "The Gulf of Mexico" – 3:43

UK CD single

1. "Lullaby" (single version) – 4:32
2. "Lullaby" (acoustic) – 4:53
3. "Changes" – 3:33

European CD single

1. "Lullaby" (single version) – 4:32
2. "Lullaby" (album version) – 5:30

Australian CD single

1. "Lullaby" (single version) – 4:32
2. "Lullaby" (acoustic version) – 4:53
3. "The Gulf of Mexico" – 3:43

== Credits and personnel ==
Credits are taken from the European CD single liner notes.

Studios

- Recorded at Orphan Studios and Southern Living at Its Finest (Atlanta, Georgia, US)
- Mixed at Encore Studios (Burbank, California, US)
- Mastered at Masterdisk (New York City)

Personnel

- Shawn Mullins – writing, vocals, production
- Glenn Matullo – recording
- Tom Lord-Alge – mixing
- Scott Hull – mastering

== Charts ==
=== Weekly charts ===
Chart (1998–1999)	Peak position
Australia (ARIA)	5
Canada Top Singles (RPM)	2
Canada Adult Contemporary (RPM)	5
Europe (Eurochart Hot 100)	35
Germany (GfK)	75
Iceland (Íslenski Listinn Topp 40)	13
Ireland (IRMA)	17
Netherlands (Dutch Top 40 Tipparade)	19
Netherlands (Single Top 100)	83
Scottish Singles Sales (Official Charts)	11
Sweden (Sverigetopplistan)	10
UK Singles (Official Charts)	9
US Billboard Hot 100	7
US Adult Top 40 (Billboard)	1
US Mainstream Top 40 (Billboard)	1
US Modern Rock Tracks (Billboard)	9
US Triple-A (Billboard)	1

=== Year-end charts ===
Chart (1998)	Position
Canada Adult Contemporary (RPM)	62
US Adult Top 40 (Billboard)	52
US Mainstream Top 40 (Billboard)	77
US Modern Rock Tracks (Billboard)	59
US Triple-A (Billboard)	19

Chart (1999)	Position
Australia (ARIA)	42
Canada Top Singles (RPM)	38
Canada Adult Contemporary (RPM)	80
UK Singles (OCC)	137
US Billboard Hot 100	46
US Adult Top 40 (Billboard)	7
US Mainstream Top 40 (Billboard)	22
US Modern Rock Tracks (Billboard)	98
US Triple-A (Billboard)	31

== Certifications ==
Region	Certification	Certified units/sales
Australia (ARIA)	Platinum	70,000^{^}
^{^} Shipments figures based on certification alone.

== Release history ==
Region	Date	Format(s)	Label(s)	Ref.
United States	August 17, 1998	Alternative radio	SMG; Columbia	
United Kingdom	February 22, 1999	CD; cassette	SMG; Columbia	
