= Pete Droge =

American alternative/folk rock musician

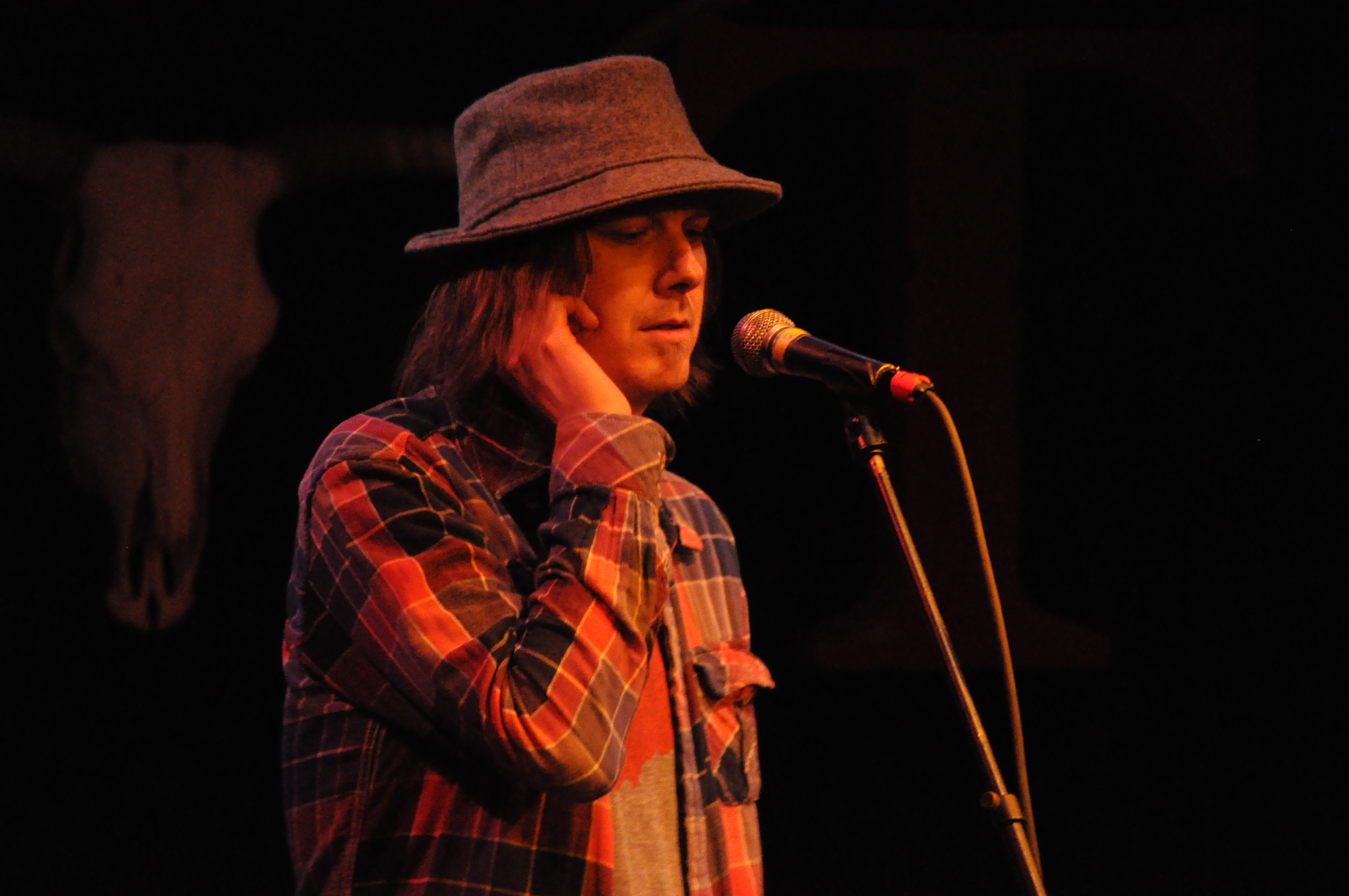
- Pete Droge, 2011

Background information
- Born: March 11, 1969 (age 57); Eugene, Oregon
- Genres: alternative rock, folk rock
- Occupation: Musician
- Years active: 1994–present
- Formerly of: The Thorns
- Website: petedroge.com

Pete Droge (born March 11, 1969) is an American alternative/folk rock musician from Vashon Island in Washington State's Puget Sound.

Droge was born in Eugene, Oregon. He was adopted and his family relocated to Seattle, Washington, and grew up in Bainbridge Island. In the 1980s, Droge attended Bainbridge Island High School and graduated.

== Career ==
=== 1990s ===
Droge was in a succession of garage bands, such as March of Crimes and 25th Hour, eventually leading to his career as a solo artist. In 1990, the first band he fronted was Ramadillo, a Seattle-based rock band with bassist Sean Mugrage, and drummer Mark Boquist. During their lifetime, the band did not obtain a record deal, but self-released a full-length album on cassette tape titled West of Here. However, Ramadillo dissolved in 1992, two years after their initial formation. Droge later released an old single "Devil's in the Best of Moods" on Between the Cracks Records in 2023.

In January 1993, Droge met his long-term collaborator and wife Elaine Summers. They first met at the opening of the Portland club The Living Room and immediately started working together, with Summers harmonizing as a backing vocalist at local gigs. Droge opened for B.B. King, Johnny Cash, Lucinda Williams, Rickie Lee Jones, and Warren Zevon, among others.

In 1994, Droge released Necktie Second, his debut album which featured the tongue-in-cheek hit song "If You Don't Love Me (I'll Kill Myself)" (which also appeared on the soundtrack for the 1994 film Dumb and Dumber), as well as, "Sunspot Stopwatch" and "So I am Over You". Droge was signed to Rick Rubin's American Recordings and had Kelly Curtis for a manager, who also managed the band Pearl Jam. Droge was good friends with guitarist Mike McCready.

In May 1995, Droge opened for Tom Petty and the Heartbreakers on the Dogs with Wings tour. Droge first met Tom Petty at Neil Young's Bridge School Benefit in 1994. Petty then watched Droge and his band perform at The Viper Room in Los Angeles, California, and proceeded to invite Droge on his tour.

=== Pete Droge & The Sinners ===
In 1996, Droge released Find a Door, an album under the name of Pete Droge and The Sinners; his backing band included Dave Hull (bass), Rob Brill (drums), Peter Stroud (guitar/vocals) and Elaine Summers (guitar/vocals). This album met with critical success but received little airplay. Notable songs include "You Should Be Running", "Dear Diane" and "Mr. Jade". That same year, Droge contributed the title song to the film, Beautiful Girls.

In 1998, Droge released Spacey and Shakin, another solo album.

Other credits included contributions to albums by Kim Richey and Stone Gossard.

=== 2000s ===
In 2000, Droge appeared in the film Almost Famous as a "Hyatt Singer", performing "Small Time Blues" with Elaine Summers. According to director Cameron Crowe on the Director's Cut Commentary of the movie, the small part was a tribute to Gram Parsons and Emmylou Harris, whom Crowe had met in 1973.

Droge is credited with the original score for the film Tattoo, a Love Story.

=== The Thorns ===
In 2003, Droge formed the group The Thorns with artists Matthew Sweet and Shawn Mullins. In the same year, Droge released another solo album, Skywatching. In 2006, Droge released Under the Waves and a song from that album, "Going Whichever Way the Wind Blows", was featured in a Toyota Sequoia commercial.

In 2009, Droge's song "Two of the Lucky Ones" was featured in the film Zombieland.

=== The Droge & Summers Blend ===
Throughout the years, Droge and Elaine Summers have collaborated and released a series of volume albums from 2009 to most recently in 2023.

== Musical style and influences ==
Droge grew up with a range of influences including Bob Dylan's Nashville Skyline, Waylon & Willie, and Johnny Cash. He later discovered the heavier music of Kiss, AC/DC, and Led Zeppelin.

Droge has been compared to artists Bob Dylan, Neil Young, Tom Petty, and Gram Parsons. In 1995, Droge told Los Angeles Times about Parsons, "I fell in love with the fragileness of his voice. He wasn't a great singer in a technical sense, but he sang with such urgency and immediacy. The songs too were very simple and pure—stories about the choices people have. There was also these religious overtones to a lot of what he did, mixing gospel and rock 'n' roll elements about temptation and salvation in ways that left you wondering just where he stood. It's not too clear to you."

== Discography ==
- West of Here (with the Ramadillo)
- Necktie Second (1994, American Recordings)
- Find a Door (1996, American Recordings)
- Spacey and Shakin (1998, Epic)
- The Thorns (with Matthew Sweet and Shawn Mullins) (2003)
- Skywatching (2003, Puzzle Tree)
- Under The Waves (2006, Puzzle Tree)
- Volume One (with Elaine Summers) (2009, Puzzle Tree)
- Volume Two (with Elaine Summers) (2014, Puzzle Tree)
- Volume Three (with Elaine Summers) (2023, Puzzle Tree)
- Fade Away Blue (2025, Missing Piece Records)
