= Shawn Mullins =

American singer-songwriter (born 1968)

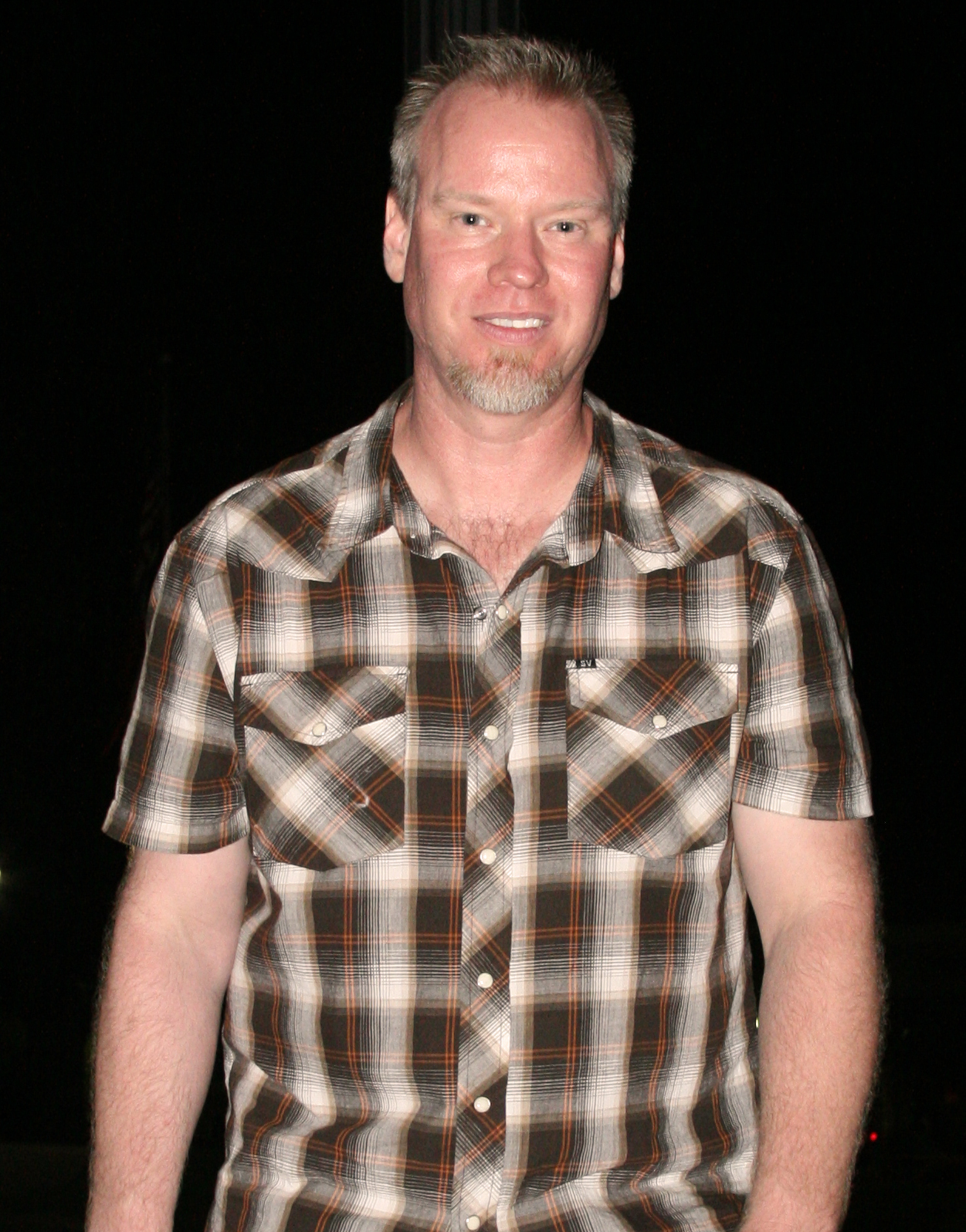
- Mullins in Lawrenceville, Georgia - July 2009

Background information
- Born: March 8, 1968 (age 58); Atlanta, Georgia, U.S.
- Genres: Alternative rock, country rock
- Years active: 1990–present
- Labels: Vanguard Records; Columbia Records
- Formerly of: The Thorns
- Website: ShawnMullins.com

Shawn Mullins (born March 8, 1968) is an American singer-songwriter who specializes in folk rock, instrumental rock, adult alternative, and Americana music. His 1998 single "Lullaby" hit number one on the Adult Top 40 and was nominated for a Grammy Award.

== Early life and military career ==
Mullins was born in Atlanta, Georgia. He cultivated an interest in music beginning in his days at Clarkston High School in Clarkston, Georgia (where he made the acquaintance of friend and mentor Amy Ray of the Indigo Girls). Later, he honed his craft in his college days at University of North Georgia (then known as North Georgia College) as a solo acoustic musician and bandmaster of the military marching band (Golden Eagle Band). He attended the University of North Georgia on an Army ROTC scholarship with an intention of possibly pursuing a military career. Although he quickly abandoned this notion in favor of songwriting, the contract nonetheless obliged him after graduation to serve a short term as an inactive infantry officer in the Individual Ready Reserve component of the U.S. Army Reserve. He served in an inactive status, reaching the rank of 1st lieutenant before fulfilling his service obligation and resigning honorably.

== Career ==
=== Shawn Eric Mullins with Twice Removed and solo career ===
Soon, he added a drummer (Mickey Hendrix) and bassist (Carlton Brown) to form the power pop trio billed as "Shawn Eric Mullins with Twice Removed", a combo that would help carry him to campus-wide and regional renown. Eventually the "Twice Removed" trio parted ways under amicable terms, and Mullins began using a variety of collaborative lineups while building his reputation as a solo artist.

=== Commercial success ===
His critical breakthrough came when his song "Lullaby", from the album Soul's Core, became a radio and video hit. In the video for "Lullaby", directed by Roger Pistole, actress Dominique Swain appeared. His song, "All in My Head", featured on the sitcom Scrubs, was written in response to an e-mail sent by producers of the show searching for a theme song. Mullins wrote a demo version and sent it in within 24 hours. It wasn't selected as the theme song, but the demo version was used in a season one episode of the series.

Another single, "Shimmer", was included on the soundtrack for Dawson's Creek and was a minor hit. "Shimmer" was also used in Australia as part of its promotional campaign during the 2000 Summer Olympics, and is still considered in Australia as the unofficial anthem of the games. To date he has yet to match the overwhelming commercial success of "Lullaby", which was also released as a live performance on the charity album Live in the X Lounge II in 1999. In early 2002, he formed the band The Thorns with Matthew Sweet and Pete Droge.

=== Vanguard Records ===
In 2006, Mullins released his first album on new label Vanguard Records, 9th Ward Pickin Parlor, as well as a new single, entitled "Beautiful Wreck", from the album. The single enjoyed modest success by reaching number one on the Americana and AAA (Adult Album Alternative), and was featured in the Cities 97 Sampler Volume 18.

On March 11, 2008, Mullins released his second album on Vanguard, entitled Honeydew. On October 12, 2010, Mullins released his third album on Vanguard, Light You Up.

=== Sugar Hill and Rounder Records ===
On October 23, 2015, Mullins released his new album, titled My Stupid Heart, under Sugar Hill and Rounder Records.

== Personal life ==
Mullins has been married and divorced three times. He has one son.

== Discography ==
=== Studio albums ===
- Better Days (1992, Sullivan Music Group)
- Big Blue Sky (1994, Sullivan Music Group)
- Eggshells (1996)
- Soul's Core (1998, Sony) US number 54, Platinum
- Beneath the Velvet Sun (2000)
- 9th Ward Pickin Parlor (2006)
- Honeydew (2008)
- Light You Up (2010)
- My Stupid Heart (2015)
- Soul's Core Revival (2018)

=== Other albums ===
- Shawn Mullins (1990) [independent album]
- Ever Changing World (1991) [independent album]
- Jeff's Last Dance, Volume 1 (1995) [live album]
- Jeff's Last Dance, Volume 2 (1995) [live album]
- The First Ten Years (1999) [compilation album]
- The Essential Shawn Mullins (2003) [compilation album]
- Live From Portland Bootleg (2004) [live album]
- Jeff's Last Dance, Volume 3 (2005) [live album]
- Lullaby: Hits, Rarities, & Gems (2007) [compilation album]
- Live at the Variety Playhouse (2008) [live album]

=== Singles ===
Year	Single	Peak chart positions									Certifications	Album
Year	Single	US	US AAA	AUS	CAN	GER	IRE	NED	SWE	UK	Certifications	Album
1998	"Lullaby"	7	1	5	2	75	17	83	10	9	ARIA: Platinum	Soul's Core
1998	"Shimmer"	—	5	39	—	—	—	—	—	—		Soul's Core
1999	"What Is Life"	—	—	62	—	—	—	—	—	62		Big Daddy: Music from the Motion Picture
2000	"Everywhere I Go"	—	3	—	—	—	—	—	—	—		Beneath the Velvet Sun
2006	"Beautiful Wreck"	—	2	—	—	—	—	—	—	—		9th Ward Pickin Parlor
2007	"All in My Head"	—	16	—	—	—	—	—	—	—		Honeydew
2010	"Light You Up"	—	3	—	—	—	—	—	—	—		Light You Up
"—" denotes releases that did not chart
