= Soul's Core =

Studio album by Shawn Mullins
- Released: July 7, 1998
- Recorded: 1994–1995
- Genres: Folk rock, pop rock
- Length: 51:37
- Label: Columbia
- Producers: Peter Collins, Russ Fowler

Shawn Mullins chronology
Eggshells (1996)	Soul's Core (1998)	Beneath the Velvet Sun (2000)

Singles from Soul's Core
- 1. "Lullaby" Released: September 22, 1998

Professional ratings
Review scores
Source	Rating
Allmusic	4/5 stars
Rolling Stone	3.5/5 stars

Soul's Core is the fourth studio album by American rock singer-songwriter Shawn Mullins, spawning the hit "Lullaby" (#1 on Adult Top 40, #9 on Modern Rock), as well as "Shimmer" (#27 on Adult Top 40). It was first released on July 7, 1998. By September 2000, Soul's Core had sold 850,000 copies in the United States.\

== Track listing ==
All songs written by Shawn Mullins, except where noted

No.	Title	Writer(s)	Length
1.	"Anchored in You"		3:21
2.	"Lullaby"		5:30
3.	"The Gulf of Mexico"		3:45
4.	"September in Seattle"		3:24
5.	"Twin Rocks, Oregon"		4:32
6.	"And on a Rainy Night"		3:22
7.	"Tannin Bed Song"		3:21
8.	"Soul Child"		4:34
9.	"Ballad of Billy Jo McKay"		3:21
10.	"Patrick's Song"		2:18
11.	"Sunday Mornin' Comin' Down"	Kris Kristofferson	6:15
12.	"You Mean Everything To Me"		3:45
13.	"Shimmer"		4:08
Total length:			51:37

== Personnel ==
- Brandon Bush – clavichord, drum loops, organ, piano, Wurlitzer
- Chad Franscoviak – handclapping, background vocals
- Rob Gal – drum loops, electric guitar
- David LaBruyere – bass guitar
- Kevin Leahy – drums
- Don McCollister – bass guitar
- Travis McNabb – drums
- Glenn Matullo – handclapping, background vocals
- Shawn Mullins – acoustic guitar, electric guitar, percussion, piano, tambourine, lead vocals, background vocals
- Myshkin – mandolin, background vocals
- David Patterson – electric guitar, synthesizer strings
- Mike West – banjo, banjolin, electric guitar, keyboards
- Shelley Yankus – background vocals

== Charts ==
Chart performance for Soul's Core
Chart (1998–1999)	Peak position
Australian Albums (ARIA)	11
German Albums (Offizielle Top 100)	63
Swedish Albums (Sverigetopplistan)	46
UK Albums (Official Charts)	60
US Billboard 200	54

== Certifications ==
Certifications for Soul's Core
Region	Certification	Certified units/sales
Australia (ARIA)	Platinum	70,000^{^}
United States (RIAA)	Platinum	1,000,000^{^}
^{^} Shipments figures based on certification alone.
