= My Stupid Heart =

Studio album by Shawn Mullins
- Released: October 23, 2015
- Genre: Folk rock, pop, Americana
- Length: 48:23

Shawn Mullins chronology
Light You Up (2010)	My Stupid Heart (2015)

My Stupid Heart is the ninth studio album release from American rock singer-songwriter Shawn Mullins.

== Track listing ==
1. The Great Unknown
2. It All Comes Down To Love
3. Ferguson
4. My Stupid Heart
5. Roll On By
6. Go And Fall
7. Gambler's Heart
8. Never Gonna Let Her Go
9. Sunshine
10. Pre-Apocalyptic Blues
