= 1986 =

1986 in various calendars
- Gregorian calendar: 1986; MCMLXXXVI
- Ab urbe condita: 2739
- Armenian calendar: 1435; ԹՎ ՌՆԼԵ
- Assyrian calendar: 6736
- Baháʼí calendar: 142–143
- Balinese saka calendar: 1907–1908
- Bengali calendar: 1392–1393
- Berber calendar: 2936
- British Regnal year: 34 Eliz. 2 – 35 Eliz. 2
- Buddhist calendar: 2530
- Burmese calendar: 1348
- Byzantine calendar: 7494–7495
- Chinese calendar: 乙丑年 (Wood Ox); 4683 or 4476 — to — 丙寅年 (Fire Tiger); 4684 or 4477
- Coptic calendar: 1702–1703
- Discordian calendar: 3152
- Ethiopian calendar: 1978–1979
- Hebrew calendar: 5746–5747
- Hindu calendars
- Vikram Samvat: 2042–2043
- Shaka Samvat: 1907–1908
- Kali Yuga: 5086–5087
- Holocene calendar: 11986
- Igbo calendar: 986–987
- Iranian calendar: 1364–1365
- Islamic calendar: 1406–1407
- Japanese calendar: Shōwa 61 (昭和６１年)
- Javanese calendar: 1918–1919
- Juche calendar: 75
- Julian calendar: Gregorian minus 13 days
- Korean calendar: 4319
- Minguo calendar: ROC 75 民國75年
- Nanakshahi calendar: 518
- Thai solar calendar: 2529
- Tibetan calendar: ཤིང་མོ་གླང་ལོ་ (female Wood-Ox); 2112 or 1731 or 959 — to — མེ་ཕོ་སྟག་ལོ་ (male Fire-Tiger); 2113 or 1732 or 960
- Unix time: 504921600 – 536457599

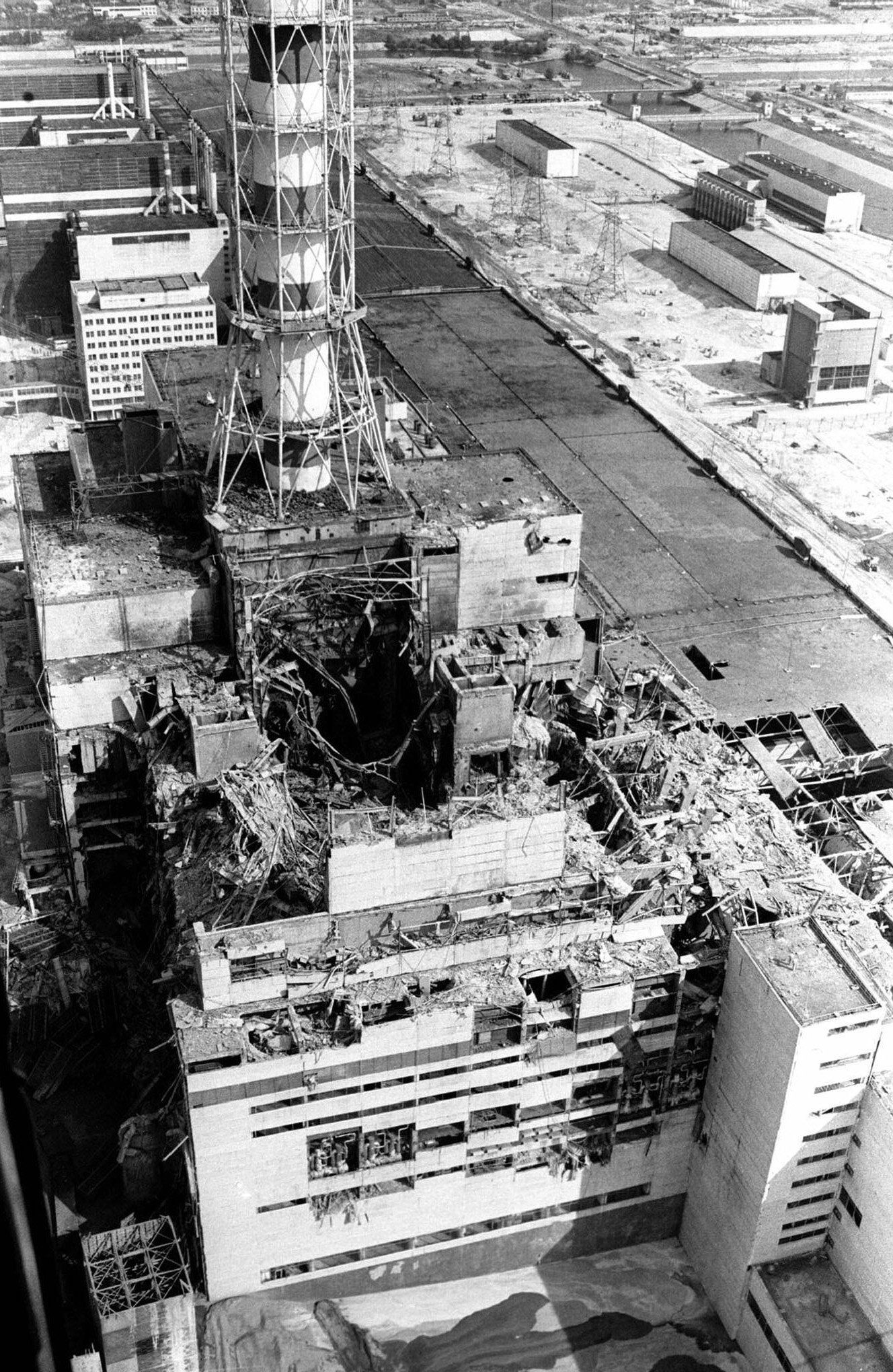
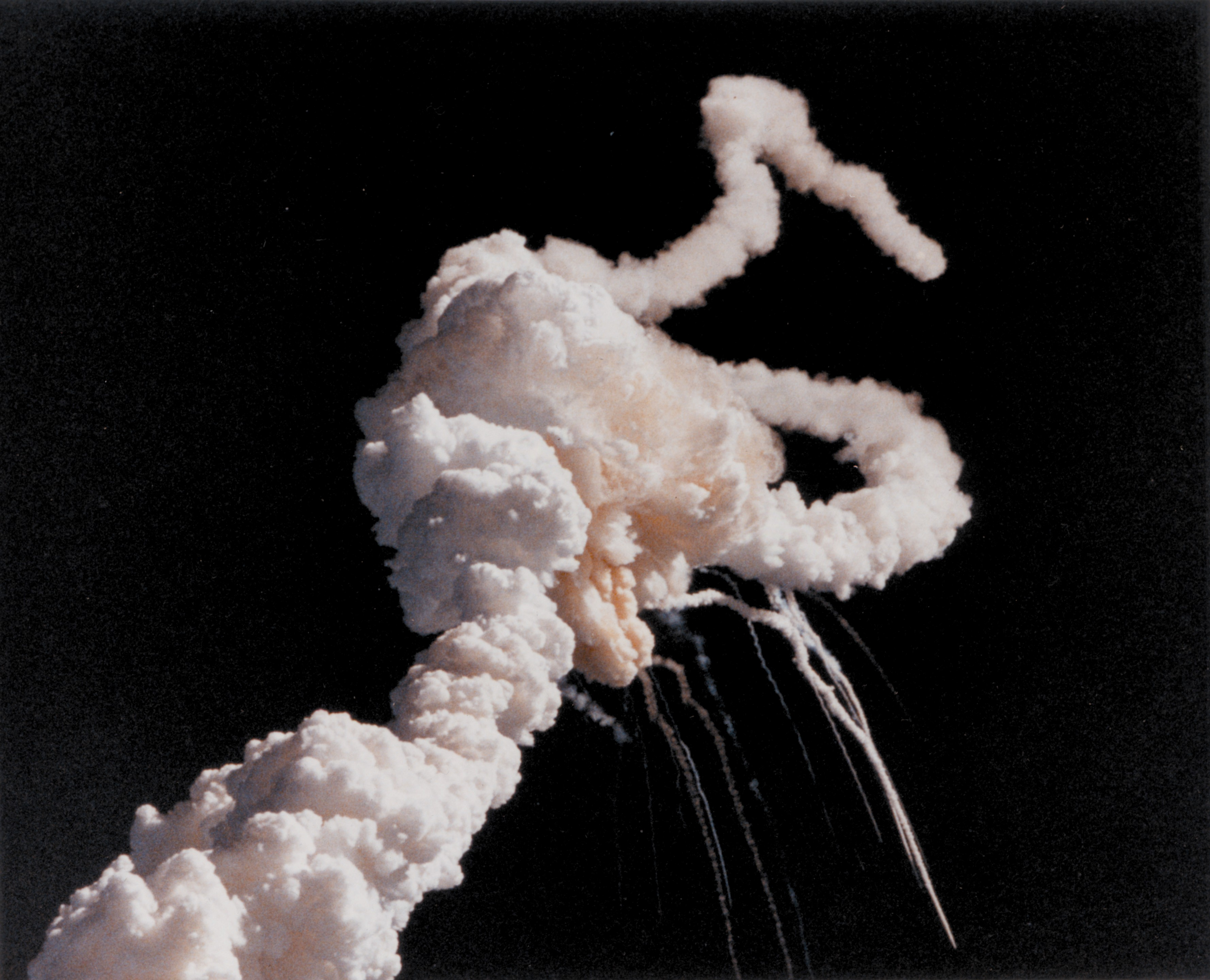
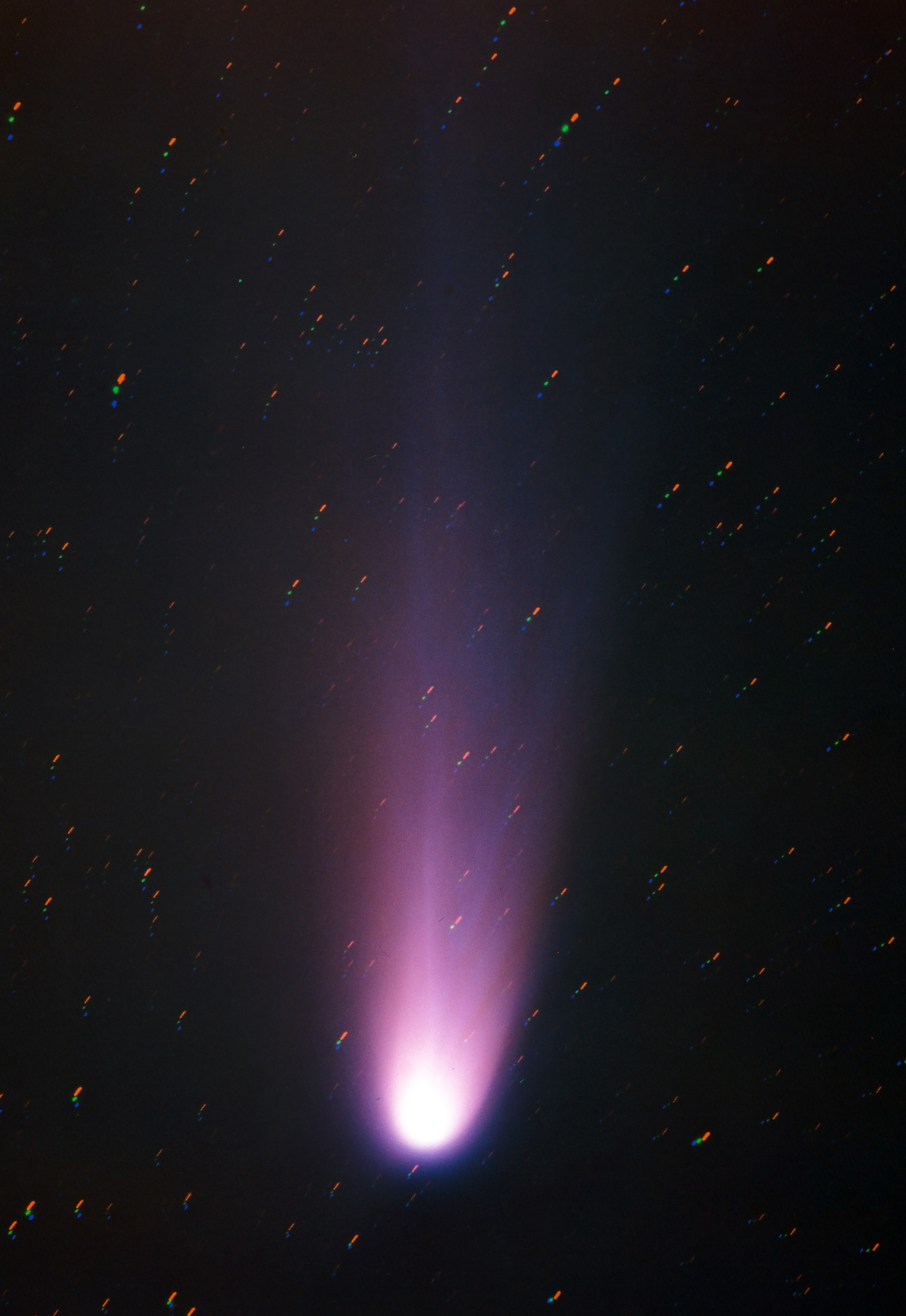
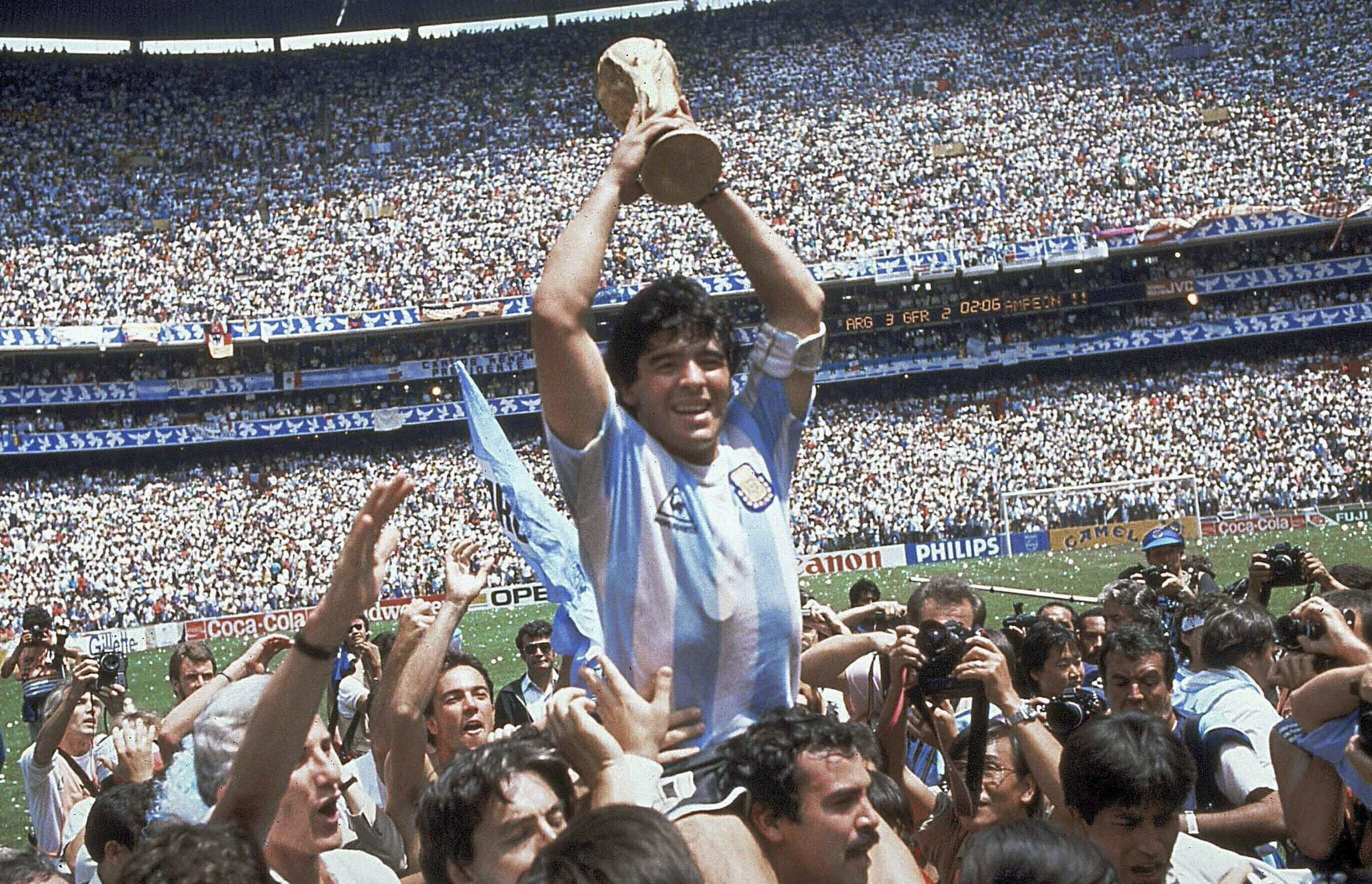
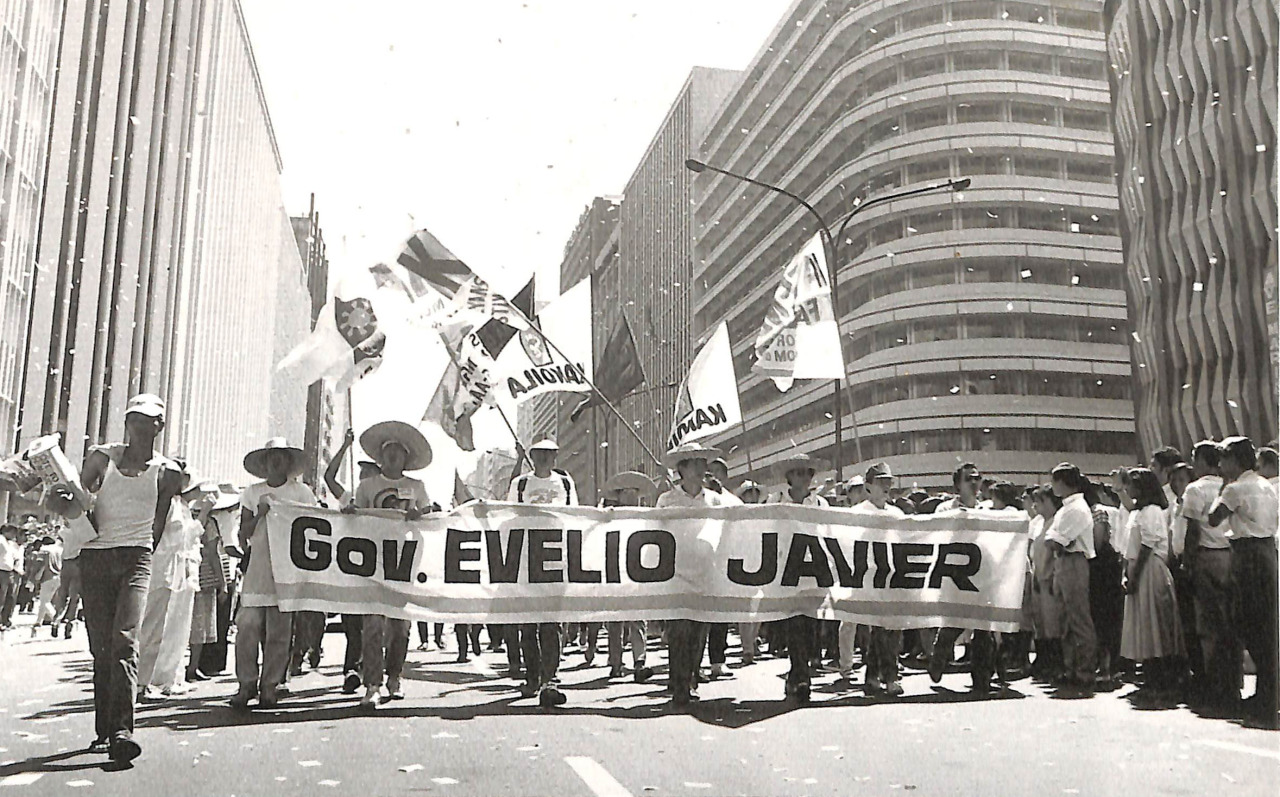
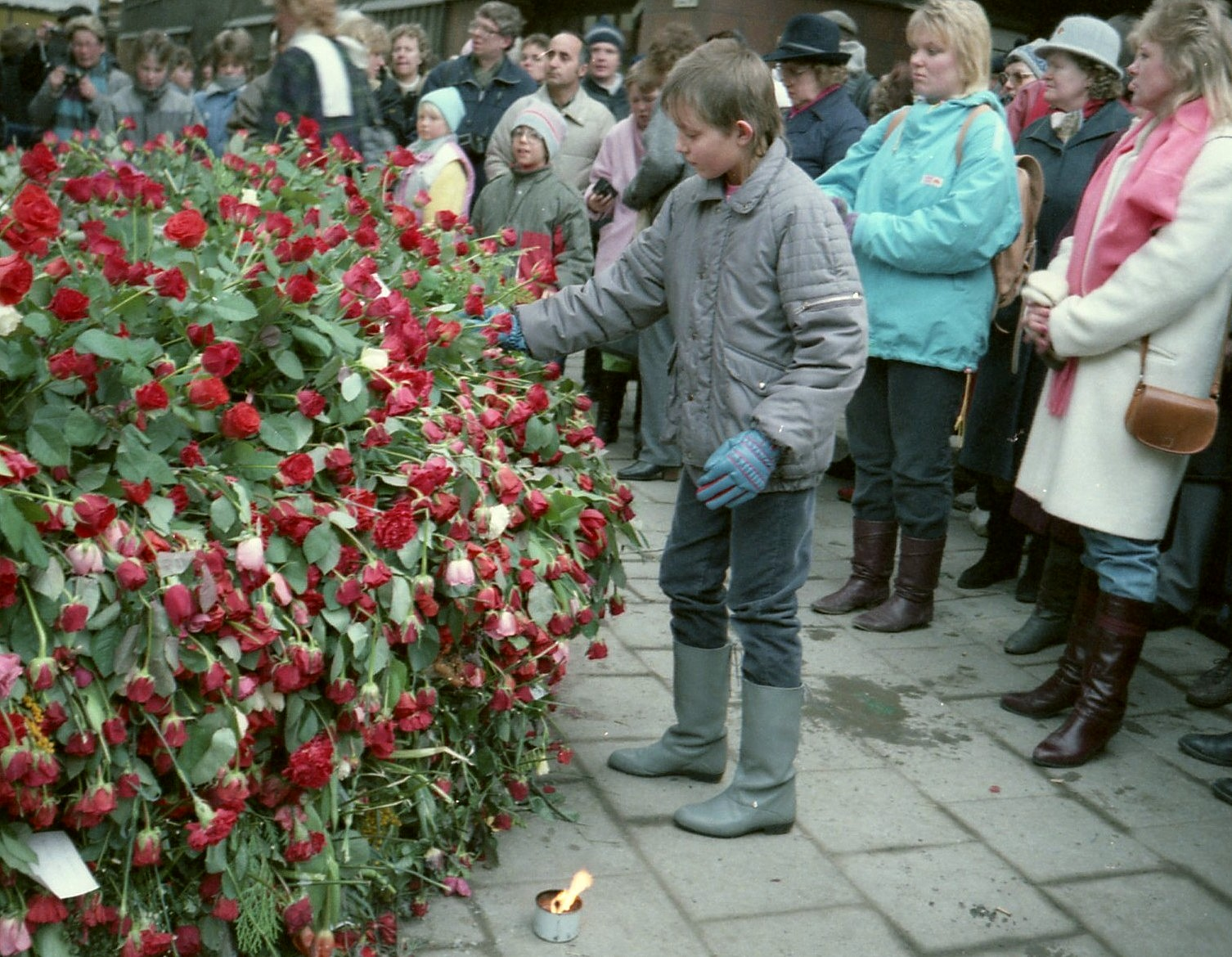
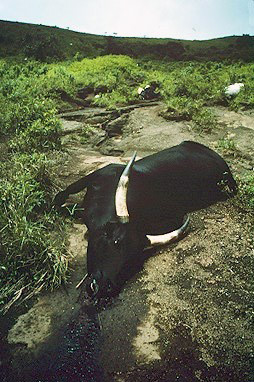
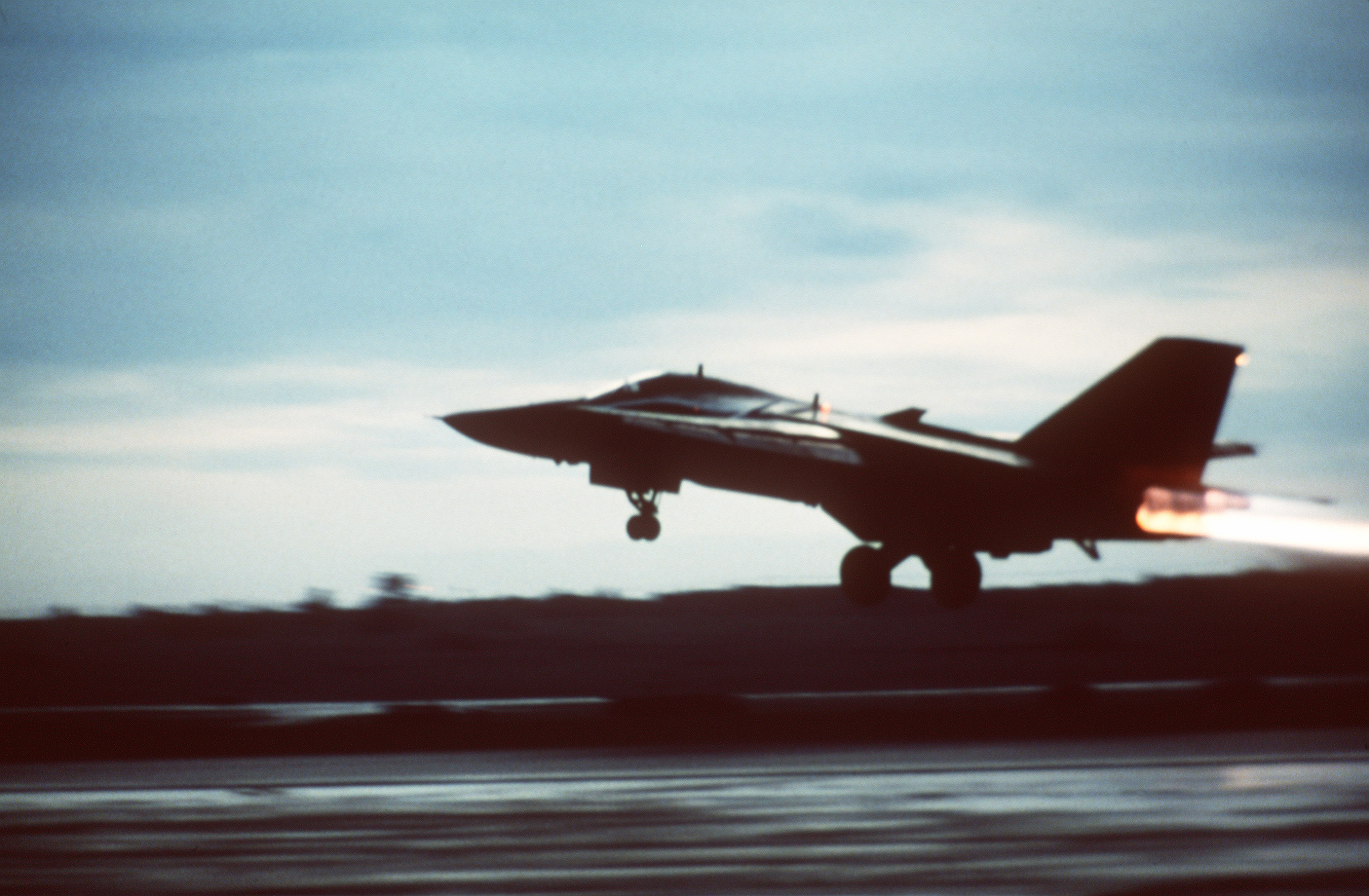
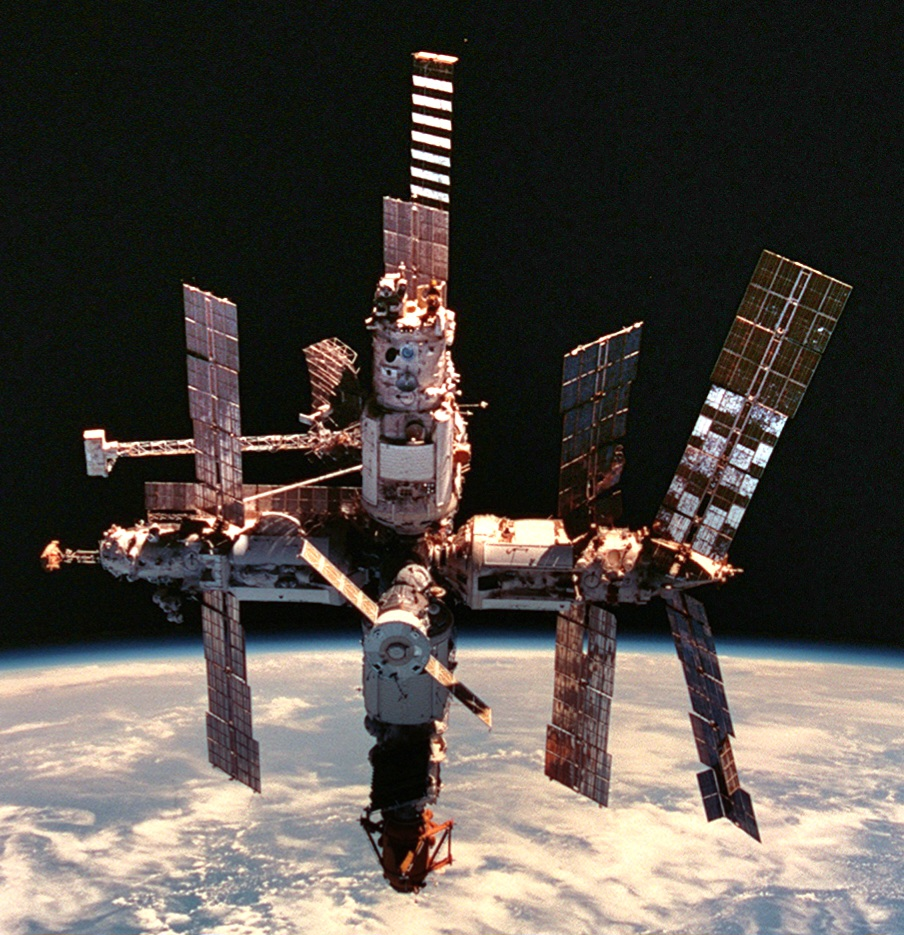
From top to bottom, left to right: the Chernobyl disaster becomes the world's worst nuclear power plant accident; the Space Shuttle Challenger disaster kills all seven crew members shortly after launch; Halley's Comet makes its closest approach to Earth; the 1986 FIFA World Cup is held in Mexico and won by Argentina; the People Power Revolution forces Ferdinand Marcos from power in the Philippines; Olof Palme is assassinated in Stockholm, Sweden; the Lake Nyos disaster kills 1,746 people and 3,500 livestock in Cameroon; the 1986 United States bombing of Libya targets Libya; and Mir is launched as the first modular space station.

1986 (MCMLXXXVI) was a common year starting on Wednesday of the Gregorian calendar, the 1986th year of the Common Era (CE) and Anno Domini (AD) designations, the 986th year of the 2nd millennium, the 86th year of the 20th century, and the 7th year of the 1980s decade.

The year 1986 was designated as the International Year of Peace by the United Nations.

== Events ==
=== January ===
- January 1
  - Aruba gains increased autonomy from the Netherlands by separating from the Netherlands Antilles.
  - Spain and Portugal enter the European Community, which becomes the European Union in 1993.
- January 11 – The Gateway Bridge in Brisbane, Australia, at this time the world's longest prestressed concrete free-cantilever bridge, is opened.
- January 13–24 – South Yemen Civil War.
- January 20 – The United Kingdom and France announce plans to construct the Channel Tunnel.
- January 21 – Conservative protestors attacked a mock shanty town that had been erected on the Green at Dartmouth College as part of anti-apartheid protests.
- January 24 – The Voyager 2 space probe makes its first encounter with Uranus.
- January 25 – Yoweri Museveni's National Resistance Army Rebel group takes over Uganda after leading a five-year guerrilla war in which up to half a million people are believed to have been killed. They will later use January 26 as the official date to avoid a coincidence of dates with Dictator Idi Amin's 1971 coup.
- January 28 – Space Shuttle Challenger disaster – STS-51-L: Space Shuttle Challenger disintegrates 73 seconds after launch from the United States, killing the crew of seven astronauts, including schoolteacher Christa McAuliffe.
- January 29 – Yoweri Museveni is sworn in as President of Uganda.

=== February ===
- February 3 – Pixar is founded by John Lasseter along with Steve Jobs.
- February 7
  - Anti-Duvalier protest movement: President Jean-Claude Duvalier ("Baby Doc") flees Haiti, ending 28 years of family rule.
  - The snap presidential election in the Philippines earlier announced by President Ferdinand Marcos is held amidst controversy, that paves the way for a chain of protests, culminating in the People Power Revolution.
- February 8 – Hinton train collision: A Canadian National train heading westbound collides with a Via Rail train in Hinton, Alberta; 23 people are killed and 71 injured in the accident.
- February 9 – Halley's Comet reaches its perihelion, the closest point to the Sun, during its second visit to the Solar System in the 20th century (the first was in 1910).
- February 10 – The Maxi Trial (Italian: Maxiprocesso) begins in the bunker room of the Ucciardone prison (Palermo). It will be the largest trial against the Sicilian Mafia.
- February 11 – Human rights activist Natan Sharansky is released by Soviet authorities and leaves the country for Israel.
- February 15 – The Beechcraft Starship makes its maiden flight.
- February 16
  - The Soviet liner MS Mikhail Lermontov sinks in the Marlborough Sounds, New Zealand.
  - Ouadi Doum air raid: The French Air Force raids the Libyan Ouadi Doum airbase in northern Chad.
  - Mário Soares wins the second round of the Portuguese presidential election.
- February 17 – The Single European Act is signed.
- February 19
  - The Soviet Union launches the Mir space station.
  - The United States Senate approves a treaty outlawing genocide.
- February 22 – The People Power Revolution begins in the Philippines to remove President Ferdinand Marcos from office.
- February 25
  - The 27th Congress of the Communist Party of the Soviet Union opens in Moscow. The General Secretary Mikhail Gorbachev introduces the keywords of his mandate to the audience: Glasnost and Perestroika.
  - People Power Revolution: President Ferdinand Marcos of the Philippines is ousted from power and goes into exile in Hawaii after 20 years of dictatorial rule; Corazon Aquino becomes the first Filipino woman president and forms an interim government with Salvador Laurel becoming her Vice-president and Prime Minister.
  - A three-day riot begins in Cairo, Egypt when around 25,000 conscripts of the Central Security Forces (CSF), staged protests in and around the city. Three luxury hotels, several nightclubs, restaurants and cars were looted and burned in the tourist districts near the Pyramids over several days. The riot became known as the Egyptian Conscripts Riot. At least 25 people died during the first day in Cairo, and an estimated 8,000 people, mostly conscripts in regions outside the city, were killed in total.
- February 27 – The United States Senate allows its debates to be televised on a trial basis.
- February 28 – Swedish Prime Minister Olof Palme is shot to death on his way home from the cinema in Stockholm, Sweden.

=== March ===
- March 1 – Olof Palme's deputy Ingvar Carlsson becomes acting Prime Minister of Sweden. He is elected Prime Minister by the Swedish Riksdag on March 15.
- March 3
  - The first paper is published describing the atomic force microscope invented the previous year by Gerd Binnig, Calvin Quate and Christopher Berger.
  - Full independence of Australia - Australia Act 1986: This law formally severed all legal ties between Australia and the United Kingdom.
- March 8 – The Japanese Suisei probe flies by Halley's Comet, studying its UV hydrogen corona and solar wind.
- March 9 – United States Navy divers find the largely intact but heavily damaged crew compartment of the Space Shuttle Challenger; the bodies of all seven astronauts are still inside.
- March 13
  - In a Black Sea incident, American cruiser USS Yorktown and the destroyer USS Caron, claiming the right of innocent passage, enter the Soviet territorial waters near the southern Crimean Peninsula.
  - Microsoft Corporation holds its initial public offering of stock shares.
- March 15 – Hotel New World collapses; 33 were killed and 17 rescued from rubble.
- March 24 – The 58th Academy Awards are held in Los Angeles, with Out of Africa winning Best Picture.
- March 26 – An article in The New York Times charges that Kurt Waldheim, former United Nations Secretary-General and candidate for president of Austria, may have been involved in Nazi war crimes during World War II.
- March 27 – Russell Street Bombing: A car bomb explodes at Russell Street Police Headquarters in Russell Street, Melbourne, killing a woman constable, the first Australian policewoman to be killed in the line of duty.
- March 31 – Mexicana Flight 940 crashes near Maravatío, Mexico, killing 167.

=== April ===
- April – The government of Ivory Coast requests international diplomatic use of the French form of its name, Côte d'Ivoire.
- April 1 – Sector Kanda: Communist Party of Nepal (Mashal) cadres attack a number of police stations in Kathmandu, seeking to incite a popular rebellion.
- April 2 – A bomb explodes on a Trans World Airlines flight from Rome to Athens, killing 4 people.
- April 5 – 1986 Berlin discotheque bombing: The West Berlin discothèque La Belle, a known hangout for United States soldiers, is bombed, killing three and injuring 230; Libya is held responsible.
- April 11 – The infamous FBI shootout in Miami results in the death of two FBI agents and the wounding of five others.
- April 13
  - Pope John Paul II officially visits the Great Synagogue of Rome, the first time a modern Pope has visited a synagogue.
  - The first child born to a non-related surrogate mother is born.
- April 14 – Hailstones weighing 1 kilogram (2.2 lb) fall on Gopalganj District, Bangladesh, killing 92.
- April 15 – Operation El Dorado Canyon: At least 15 people die after United States planes bomb targets in the Libyan capital, Tripoli, and the Benghazi region.
- April 16 – The United Kingdom and the Kingdom of the Netherlands sign a peace treaty, thus ending the Three Hundred and Thirty Five Years' War, one of the longest wars in human history.
- April 17
  - Lebanon hostage crisis: British journalist John McCarthy is kidnapped in Beirut (he is released in August 1991) and three others are killed in retaliation for the bombing of Libya.
  - The Hindawi affair begins when an Irish woman is found carrying explosives onto an El Al flight from London to Tel Aviv.
  - An alleged state of war lasting 335 years between the Netherlands and the Isles of Scilly declared peace, bringing an end to any hypothetical war that may have existed.
- April 18 – Titan 34D-9 explodes just after launch while carrying the final KH-9 satellite.
- April 21 – Lorimar-Telepictures launches as a mass media company.
- April 26 – Chernobyl disaster: A mishandled safety test at the Chernobyl Nuclear Power Plant in Pripyat, Ukrainian SSR, Soviet Union "killed at least 4,056 people and damaged almost $7 billion of property". Radioactive fallout from the accident is concentrated near Belarus, Ukraine and Russia and at least 350,000 people are forcibly resettled away from these areas. After the accident, "traces of radioactive deposits unique to Chernobyl were in nearly every country in the northern hemisphere".
- April 29 – The diamond jubilee of Hirohito is held at the Ryōgoku Kokugikan in Tokyo.

=== May ===
- May 2 – Expo 86, the 1986 World Exposition on Transportation and Communication, a World's fair, opens in Vancouver, British Columbia, Canada.
- May 8 – Óscar Arias is inaugurated into his first term as President of Costa Rica.
- May 12 – NBC unveils its current peacock logo at the finale of its 60th anniversary special.
- May 16
  - The Seville Statement on Violence is adopted by an international meeting of scientists, convened by the Spanish National Commission for UNESCO, in Seville, Spain.
- May 23 – Somali President Siad Barre is injured in a car accident in Mogadishu and taken to Saudi Arabia for treatment. Somali opposition groups see this as an opportunity to try to remove Barre, beginning the Somali Civil War.
- May 25
  - Hands Across America: At least 5,000,000 people form a human chain from New York City to Long Beach, California, to raise money to fight hunger and homelessness.
  - The Bangladeshi double-decked ferry Shamia capsizes in the Meghna River, southern Barisal, Bangladesh, killing more than 500 by some estimates.

=== June ===
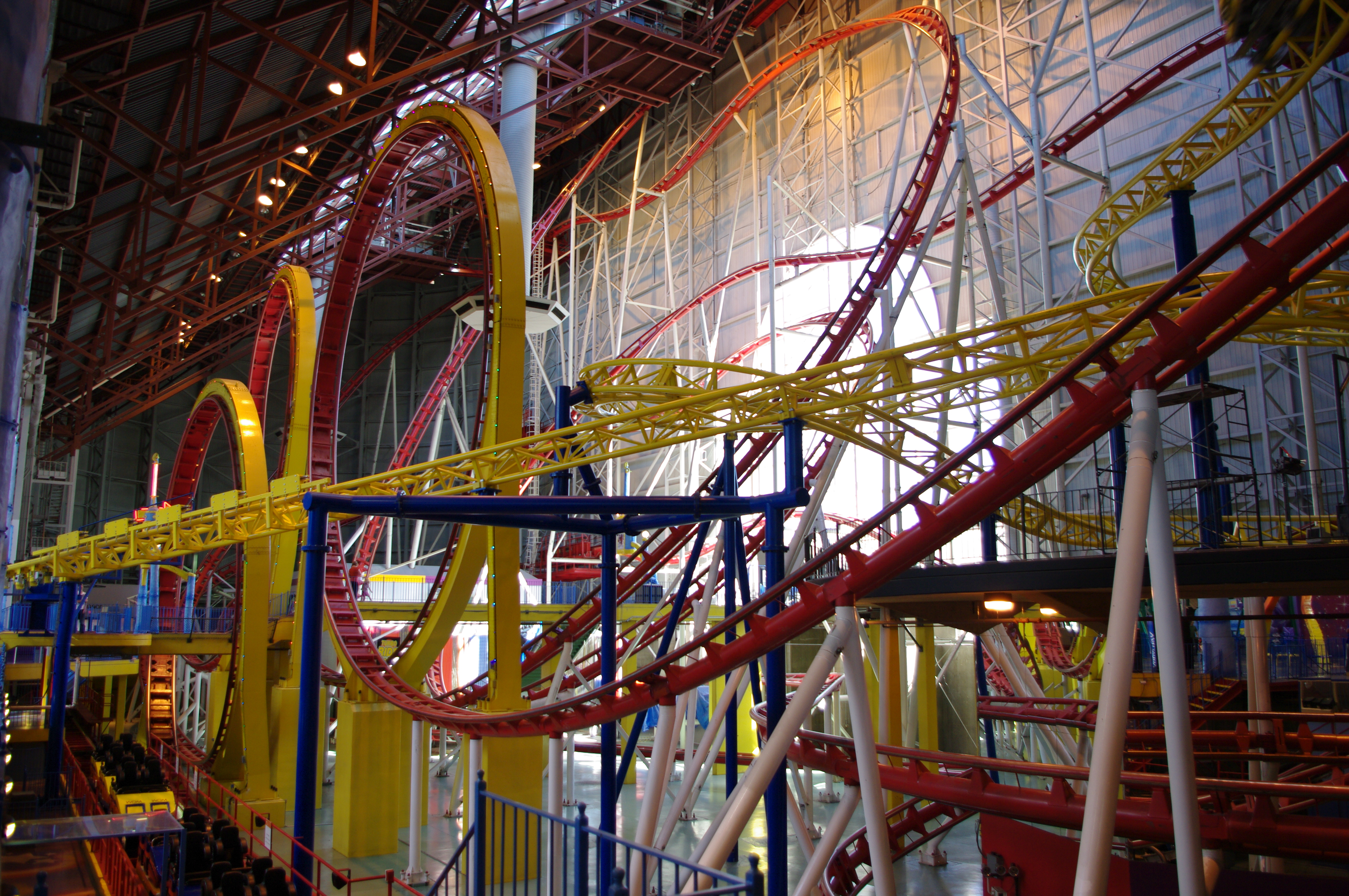
June 14: The Mindbender at Galaxyland inside West Edmonton Mall derails, kills three riders, injures one rider, and slams into a concrete post

- June – Construction of the Oosterscheldekering, the world's largest openable storm surge flood barrier, is completed in the Netherlands.
- June 4 – Jonathan Pollard pleads guilty to espionage for selling top secret United States military intelligence to Israel.
- June 7 - Washington DC metro opens Falls Church, Vienna, and Dunn Loring train stations on the Orange line.
- June 8 – Former United Nations Secretary-General Kurt Waldheim is elected president of Austria.
- June 9 – The Rogers Commission releases its report on the Space Shuttle Challenger disaster.
- June 12 – South Africa declares a nationwide state of emergency.
- June 14 – Fantasyland's Mindbender derails and kills three people.
- June 22 – In one of the most famous FIFA World Cup matches, Argentinian football player Diego Maradona scores one handball goal (nicknamed the "Hand of God") and then dribbles past the entire English football team to score a second goal (nicknamed "The Goal of the Century") with Argentina winning 2–1 against England.
- June 23 – Eric Thomas develops LISTSERV, the first email list management software.
- June 29 – Argentina defeats West Germany 3–2 in the final to win the 1986 World Cup at the Estadio Azteca in Mexico City.

=== July ===
- July 2 – Walt Disney Pictures releases the company's 26th animated film, The Great Mouse Detective.
- July 4 – The Statue of Liberty is reopened to the public after celebrating its centennial and an extensive refurbishment.
- July 5 – 20 – The inaugural Goodwill Games are held in Moscow, marking the first international event in a decade for competition between the United States and the Soviet Union.
- July 7 – Australian drug smugglers Kevin Barlow and Brian Chambers are executed in Malaysia.
- July 11 – The New Zealand Homosexual Law Reform Act decriminalizes consensual sex between men from the age of 16.
- July 23 – In London, the then Prince Andrew, Duke of York (later Andrew Mountbatten-Windsor) marries Sarah Ferguson at Westminster Abbey.

=== August ===
- August 6
  - A low-pressure system moving from South Australia and redeveloping off the New South Wales coast dumps a record 328 millimetres (12.9 in) of rain in a day on Sydney.
  - Australian Democrats leader Don Chipp retires from federal parliament and is succeeded by Janine Haines, the first woman to lead a political party in Australia.
  - Metroid is released by Nintendo for the Famicom Disk System.
- August 16 – Typhoon Wayne formed over the South China Sea, going on to become one of the longest-lived tropical cyclones at 21 days, and kill 490.
- August 19 – Two weeks after it was stolen, the Picasso painting The Weeping Woman is found in a locker at the Spencer Street Station in Melbourne, Australia.
- August 20 – In Edmond, Oklahoma, United States Postal Service employee Patrick Sherrill guns down 14 of his coworkers before committing suicide.
- August 21 – The Lake Nyos disaster, a limnic eruption, occurs in Cameroon, killing nearly 2,000 people.
- August 31
  - The Soviet passenger liner SS Admiral Nakhimov collides with the bulk carrier Pyotr Vasev in the Black Sea and sinks in seven minutes with heavy loss of life.
  - Aeroméxico Flight 498, a Douglas DC-9, collides with a Piper PA-28 over Cerritos, California, killing 82 (67 on both aircraft and 15 on the ground).
  - The cargo ship Khian Sea departs from the docks of Philadelphia, carrying 14,000 tons of toxic waste. It wanders the seas for the next 16 months trying to find a place to dump its cargo. The waste is later dumped in Haiti.

=== September ===
- September 1 – Jordan University of Science and Technology is established in Jordan.
- September 4 – Eusko Alkartasuna, the Basque Social Democratic Party, is created in Vitoria-Gasteiz.
- September 5 – Pan Am Flight 73, with 358 people on board, is hijacked at Karachi International Airport by four Abu Nidal terrorists.
- September 6
  - The Big Mac Index is introduced in The Economist newspaper as a semi-humorous international measure of purchasing power parity.
  - In Istanbul, two Abu Nidal terrorists kill 22 and wound 6 inside the Neve Shalom Synagogue during Shabbat services.
- September 7
  - Desmond Tutu becomes the first black Anglican Church bishop in South Africa.
  - Chilean dictator Augusto Pinochet survives an assassination attempt by the FPMR; 5 of Pinochet's bodyguards are killed.
- September 13 – The 6.0 M_{w} Kalamata earthquake shook southern Greece with a maximum Mercalli intensity of X (Extreme). The shock left at least 20 dead, 300 injured, and caused $5 million in damage.
- September 28 – The Democratic Progressive Party is founded. It was part of the Tangwai movement in the new generation to challenge Kuomintang in Taiwan's one-party politics, and is currently one of only two parties to win presidential elections in Taiwan.

=== October ===
- October 1 – U.S. President Ronald Reagan signs the Goldwater–Nichols Act into law, making official the largest reorganization of the United States Department of Defense since the Air Force was made a separate branch of service in 1947.
- October 3
  - TASCC, a superconducting cyclotron, officially opens at Chalk River Laboratories.
  - A hybrid solar eclipse was visible off the coast of Iceland, and was the 53rd solar eclipse of Solar Saros 124.
- October 9
  - United States District Court Judge Harry E. Claiborne becomes the fifth federal official to be removed from office through impeachment.
  - News Corporation completes its acquisition of the Metromedia group of companies, thereby launching the Fox Broadcasting Company.
  - The Phantom of the Opera, the longest running Broadway show in history, opens at Her Majesty's Theatre in London.
- October 10 – The 5.7 M_{w} San Salvador earthquake shook San Salvador, El Salvador with a maximum Mercalli intensity of IX (Violent). Up to 1,500 people were killed.
- October 11–12 – Cold War: Ronald Reagan and Soviet leader Mikhail Gorbachev meet in Reykjavík, Iceland, to continue discussions about scaling back their intermediate missile arsenals in Europe, which end in failure.
- October 16 – The International Olympic Committee chooses Albertville, France to be the host city of the 1992 Winter Olympics and Barcelona, Spain to be the host city of the 1992 Summer Olympics. The IOC also announces that the summer and winter games will separate with the winter games on every even, common year; and the summer games on every leap year starting from 1992.
- October 19 – Mozambican President Samora Machel's plane crashes in South Africa, killing him and 33 and others.
- October 21 – The Marshall Islands became an associated state under the Compact of Free Association.
- October 22 – In New York City, WNBC Radio's traffic helicopter crashes into the Hudson River, killing traffic reporter Jane Dornacker. The last words heard on-the-air are Dornacker's screams of terror, "Hit the water! Hit the water! Hit the water!"
- October 25 – A routine slow roller slips through Bill Buckner's legs, allowing the New York Mets to complete a stunning comeback in Game 6 of the 1986 World Series against the Boston Red Sox. The Mets won 6–5 in 10 innings.
- October 26
  - Bus deregulation goes into effect in the United Kingdom, except Greater London and Northern Ireland.
  - The state funeral of President Samora Machel of Mozambique takes place in Maputo.
- October 27 – The New York Mets win 4 games to 3 in the 1986 World Series against the Boston Red Sox.
- October 29 – British Prime Minister Margaret Thatcher officially opens the M25 Motorway, which encircles Greater London, in a ceremony on the carriageway near Potters Bar. It became Europe's second longest orbital road upon completion, and provides the first and only full bypass of London.
- October 30 – The National Park Passport Stamps program begins in the United States.

=== November ===
- November 1
  - Queensland, Australia: Joh Bjelke-Petersen wins his final election as Premier of Queensland with 38.6% of the vote. He resigns on December 1, 1987, following revelations of his involvement with corruption released in the Fitzgerald Inquiry.
  - Sandoz chemical spill: A major environmental disaster near Basel, Switzerland pollutes the Rhine, when an agrochemical storehouse catches on fire.
- November 3
  - Iran–Contra affair: The Lebanese magazine Ash-Shiraa reports that the United States has been selling weapons to Iran in secret, in order to secure the release of 7 American hostages held by pro-Iranian groups in Lebanon.
  - The Northern Mariana Islands enter in a political union with the United States. The island's government adopted its own constitution in 1977, and the constitutional government took office in January 1978. The covenant was fully implemented November 3, 1986, pursuant to Presidential Proclamation no. 5564, which conferred United States citizenship on legally qualified island residents.
- November 6
  - 45 people are killed in the 1986 British International Helicopters Chinook crash.
  - Alex Ferguson is appointed as the new manager of Manchester United.
- November 18 – Greater Manchester Police announce that they will search for the bodies of 2 missing children (who both vanished more than 20 years ago) after the Moors murderers Ian Brady and Myra Hindley confess to 2 more murders.
- November 21 – Iran-Contra Affair: National Security Council member Oliver North and his secretary, Fawn Hall, start shredding documents implicating them in selling weapons to Iran and channeling the proceeds to help fund the Contra rebels in Nicaragua.

=== December ===
- December 4
  - The MV Amazon Venture oil tanker begins leaking oil while at the port of Savannah in the United States, resulting in an oil spill of approximately 500,000 US gallons (1,900,000 L).
  - 29 people are killed in the Pozzetto massacre
- December 6 – Johnny Hallyday released his 35th album Gang.
- December 7 – A magnitude 5.7 earthquake destroys most of the Bulgarian town of Strajica, killing 2 people.
- December 14 – Rutan Voyager, an experimental aircraft designed by Burt Rutan and piloted by Dick Rutan and Jeana Yeager, begins its flight around the world from Edwards Air Force Base in the United States.
- December 16 – Jeltoqsan, mass anti-government protests, break out across the Kazakh SSR, resulting in the massacre of over 165 protesters.
- December 19 – Soviet dissident Andrei Sakharov is permitted to return to Moscow after six years of internal exile.
- December 20 – Three African Americans are assaulted by a group of white teens in the Howard Beach neighborhood of Queens, New York. One of the victims, Michael Griffith, is run over and killed by a motorist while attempting to flee the attackers.
- December 23 – Rutan Voyager completes the first nonstop circumnavigation of the earth by air without refueling in 9 days, 3 minutes and 44 seconds.
- December 31
  - Dupont Plaza Hotel arson: A hotel fire in San Juan, Puerto Rico, kills 97 and injures 140.
  - Soviet submarine Krasnoyarsk (K-173) is commissioned.

=== Date unknown ===
- Average per capita income in Japan exceeds that in the United States.
- The first commercially available 3D printer is sold.
- Opus Pro, a Latvian hard rock group, is established.
- The band Sweet Children (now known as Green Day) was formed by the lead singer, Billie Joe Armstrong.
- The Province of Flevoland is established in the Netherlands.
- Cadbury Dairy Milk range adopts separate wrappers for different countries until 1992.

== Births ==
Those born in the year 1986 are considered millennials (Generation Y or Gen Y).

=== January ===
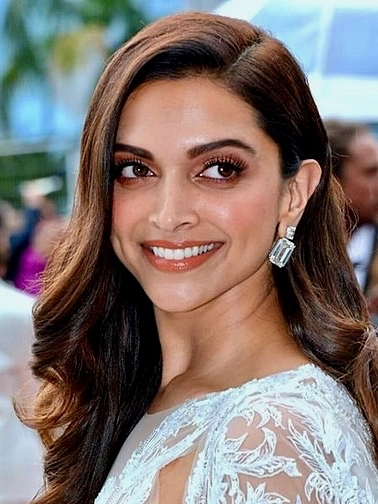
Deepika Padukone

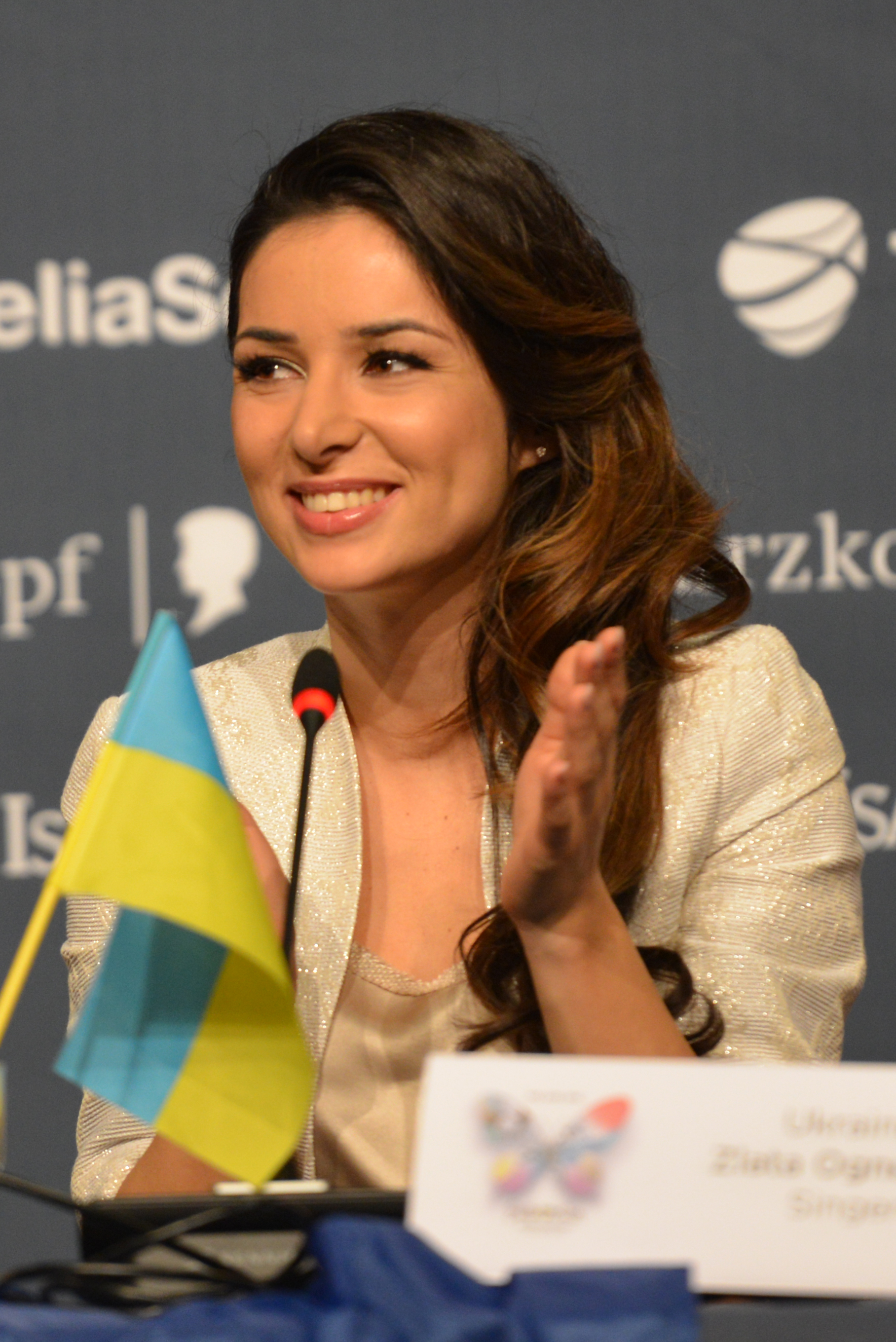
Zlata Ognevich

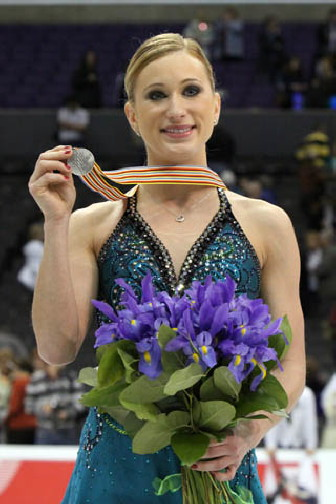
Joannie Rochette

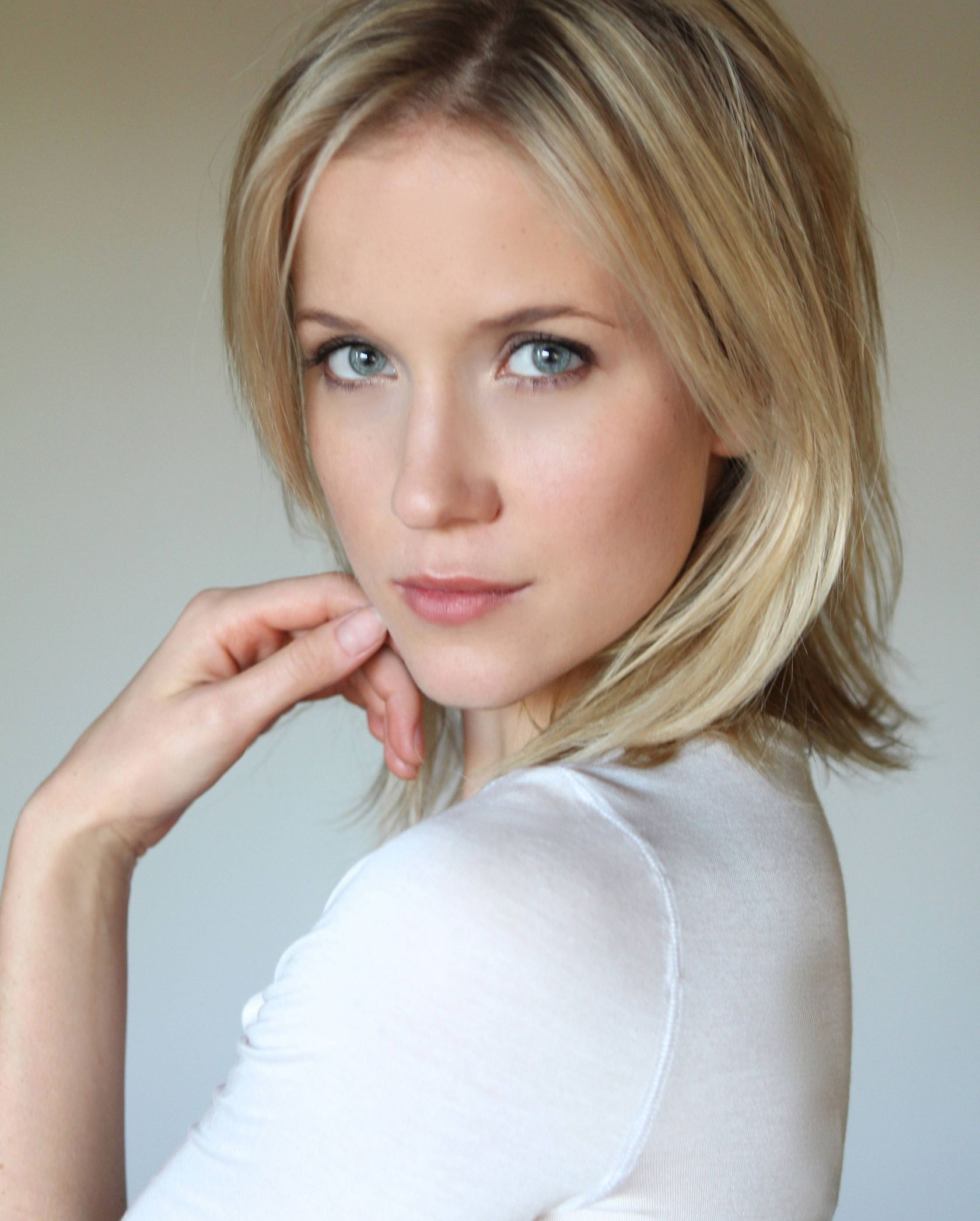
Jessy Schram

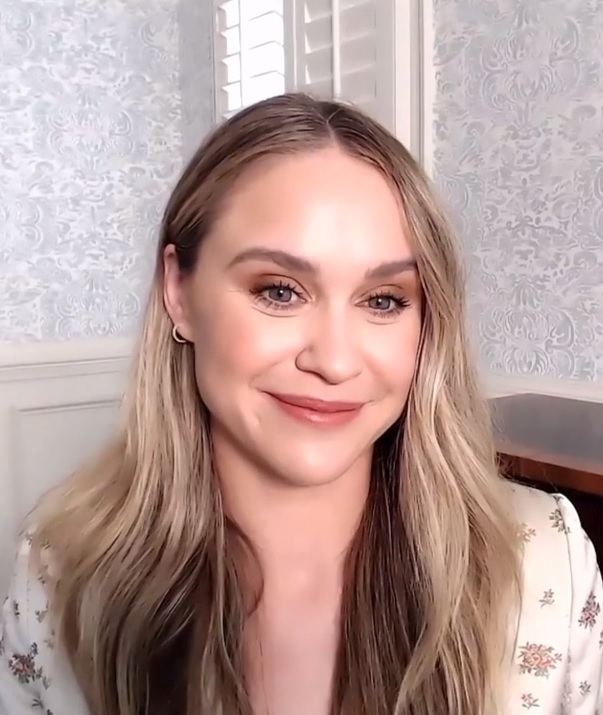
Becca Tobin

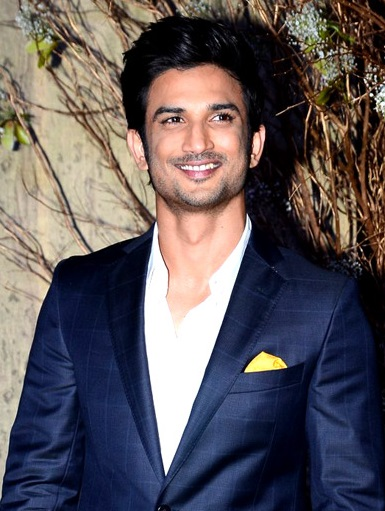
Sushant Singh Rajput

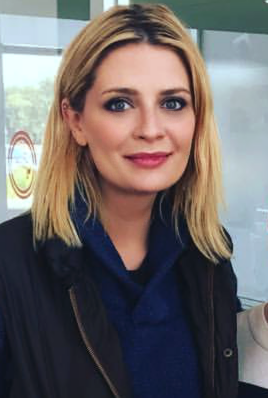
Mischa Barton

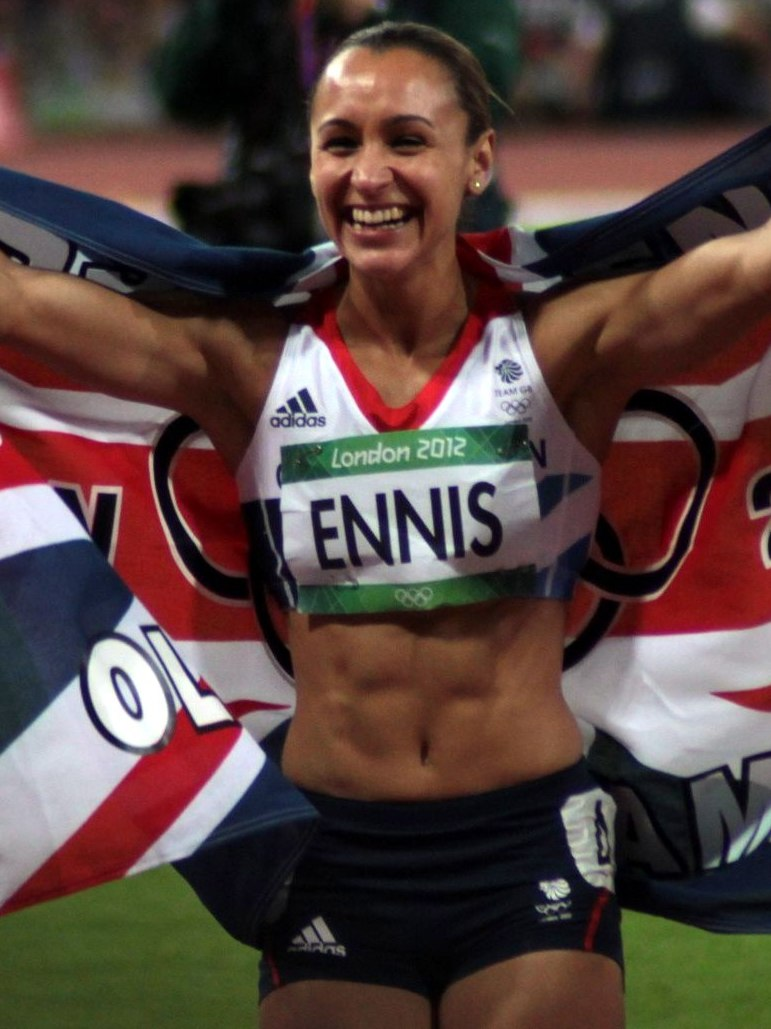
Jessica Ennis-Hill

- January 1
  - Pablo Cuevas, Uruguayan tennis player
  - Glen Davis, American basketball player
  - Lee Sung-min, South Korean actor and singer
  - Colin Morgan, Northern Irish actor
  - Jessica Gunning, English actress
- January 2
  - Yulia, Russian-New Zealander classical crossover singer
  - Nathan Cowen, New Zealand rower
  - Nicole Reinhardt, German canoeist
  - Trombone Shorty, American jazz musician
- January 4
  - Katrina Halili, Filipina actress and commercial model
  - Andrei Krauchanka, Belarusian decathlete
  - Hsieh Su-wei, Taiwanese tennis player
  - James Milner, English footballer
- January 5
  - Teppei Koike, Japanese singer and actor
  - Deepika Padukone, Indian actress and producer
  - Yana Shemyakina, Ukrainian fencer
- January 6
  - Paul McShane, Irish professional footballer
  - Petter Northug, Norwegian Olympic skier
  - Irina Shayk, Russian model
  - Peng Shuai, Chinese tennis player
  - Michelle Waterson, American mixed martial artist and model
  - Alex Turner, English musician
- January 8
  - Jaclyn Linetsky, Canadian actress and voice actress (d. 2003)
  - David Silva, Spanish footballer
- January 10
  - Abbey Clancy, English model
  - Kirsten Flipkens, Belgian tennis player
  - Chen Jin, Chinese badminton player
  - Suzanne Harmes, Dutch artistic gymnast
  - Kenneth Vermeer, Dutch footballer
- January 12
  - Jakob Oftebro, Norwegian actor
  - Zlata Ognevich, Ukrainian singer
  - Dani Osvaldo, Argentine born-Italian footballer
- January 13
  - Laura Ludwig, German beach volleyball player
  - Joannie Rochette, Canadian figure skater
- January 14 – Yohan Cabaye, French footballer
- January 15 – Jessy Schram, American actress
- January 16 – Paula Pareto, Argentinian judoka
- January 17
  - Max Adler, American actor
  - Chloe Rose Lattanzi, Australian actress and singer
- January 18
  - Marya Roxx, Estonian musician
  - Becca Tobin, American actress and singer
- January 19 – Claudio Marchisio, Italian footballer
- January 20 – Genie Chuo, Taiwanese singer and actress
- January 21
  - Jonathan Quick, American Ice Hockey player
  - Sushant Singh Rajput, Indian actor (d. 2020)
- January 23
  - José Enrique, Spanish footballer
  - Michael Stevens, American scientist and entertainer
- January 24
  - Mischa Barton, British-American actress
  - Raviv Ullman, Israeli-American actor, director, and musician
- January 26
  - Gerald Green, American basketball player
  - Matt Heafy, American musician
  - Kim Jae-joong, South Korean actor and pop singer
  - Taylor Wilde, Canadian professional wrestler
- January 28
  - Dame Jessica Ennis-Hill, British heptathlete
  - Shruti Haasan, Indian actress and musician
- January 29
  - Drew Tyler Bell, American actor and dancer
  - Sarah Jaffe, American singer

=== February ===
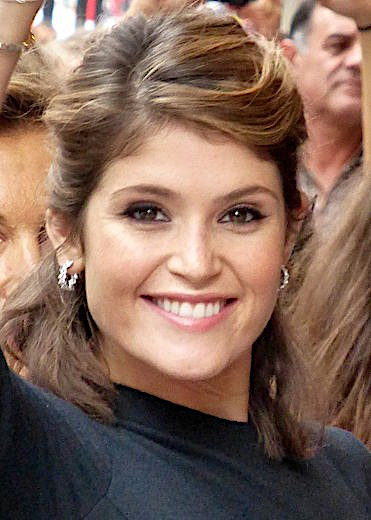
Gemma Arterton

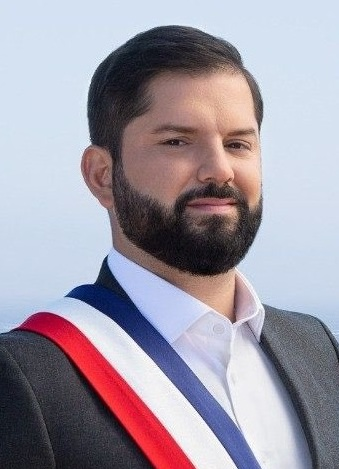
Gabriel Boric

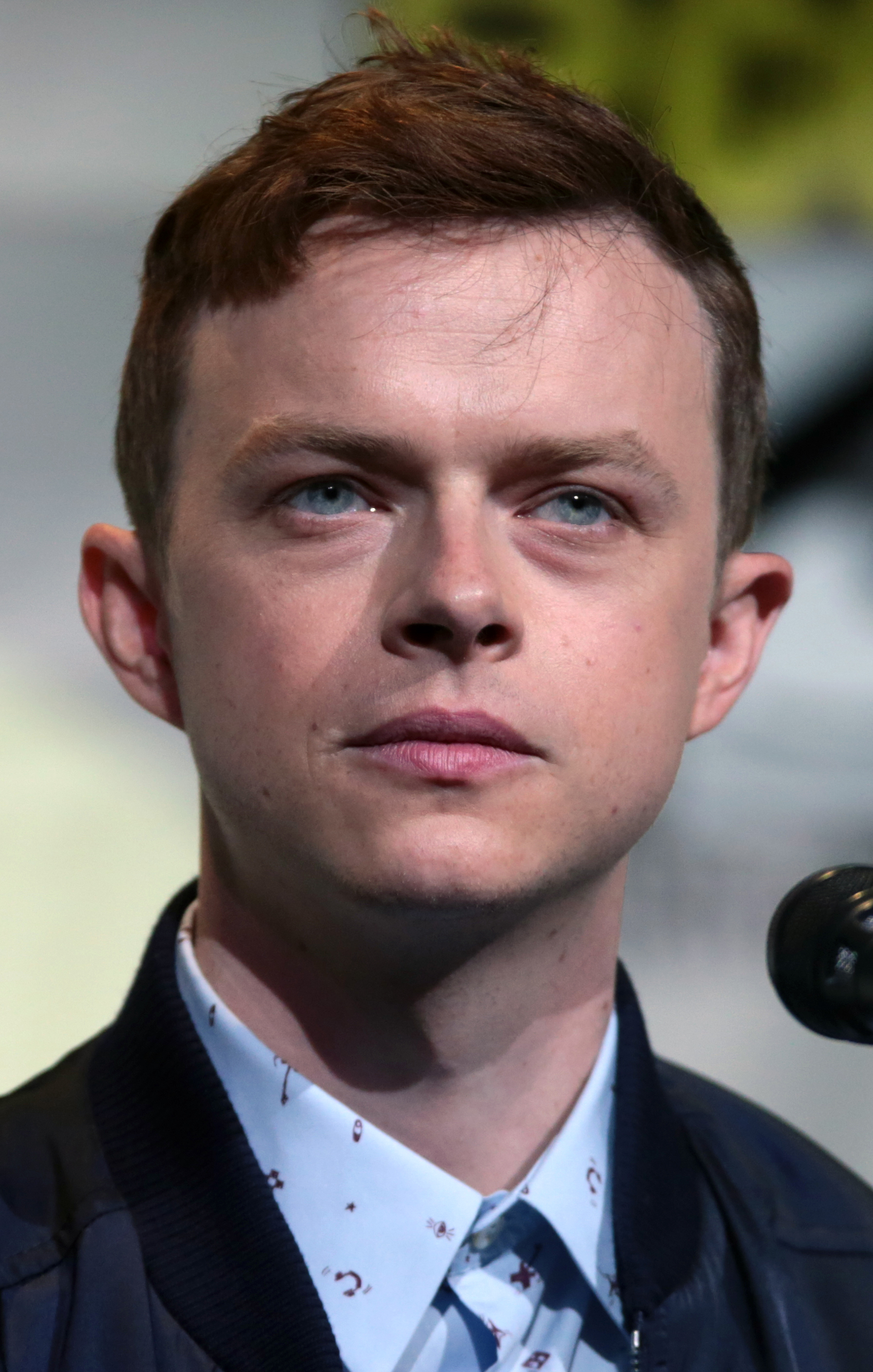
Dane DeHaan

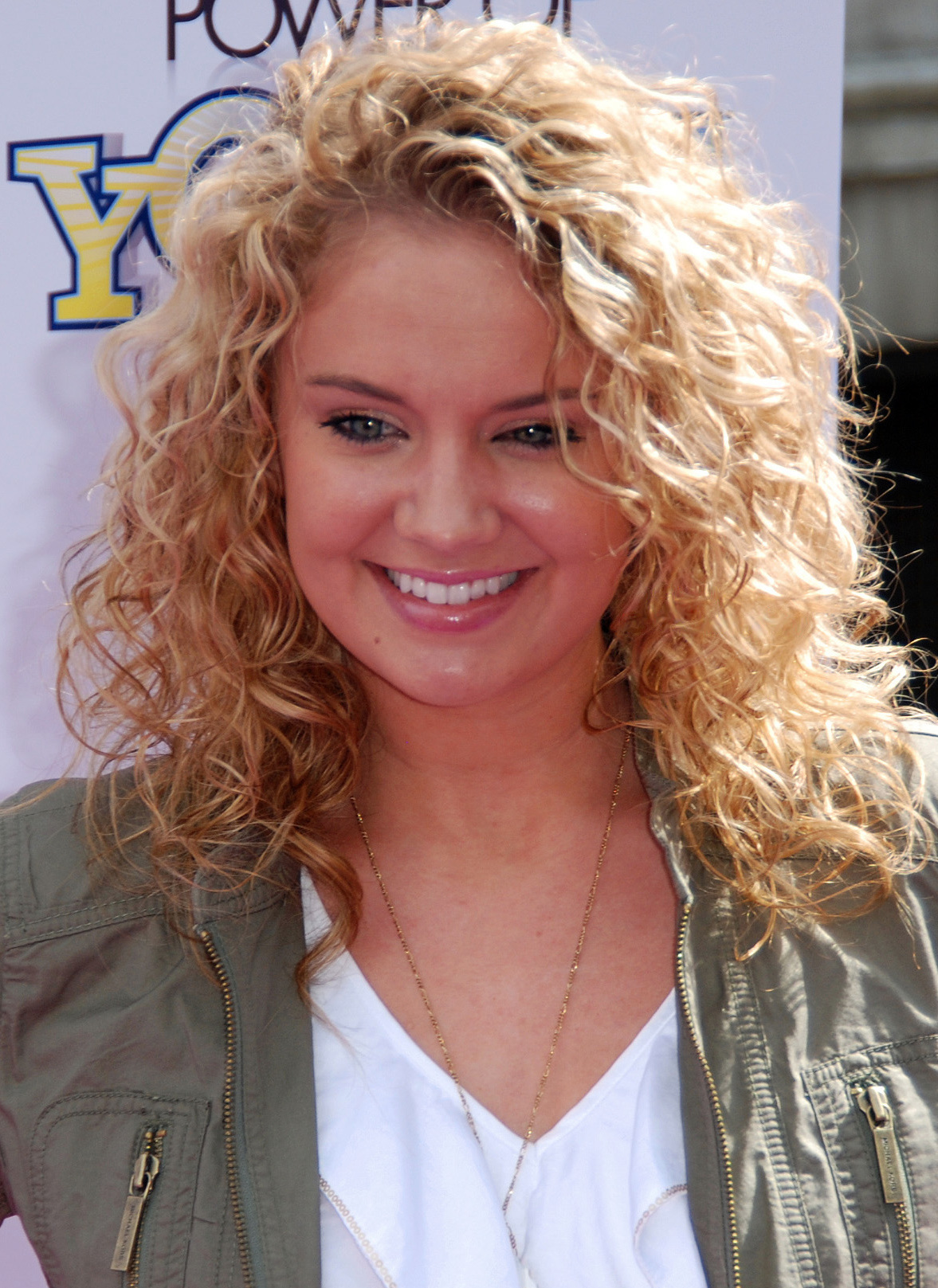
Tiffany Thornton

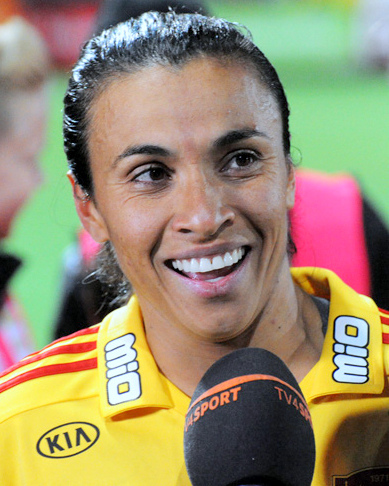
Marta

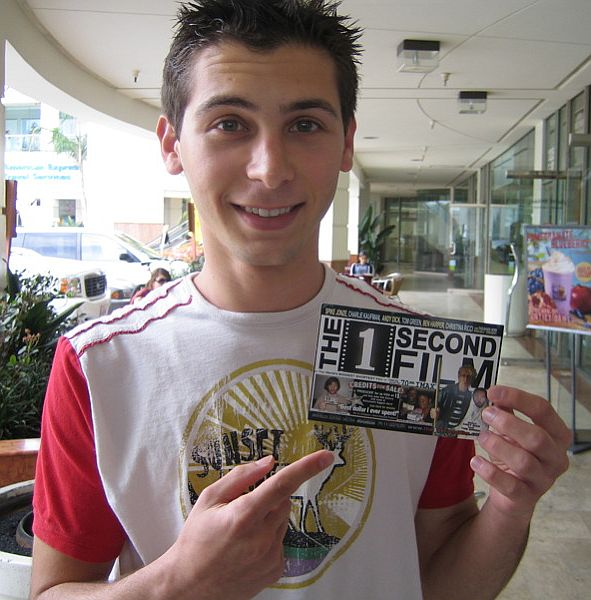
Justin Berfield

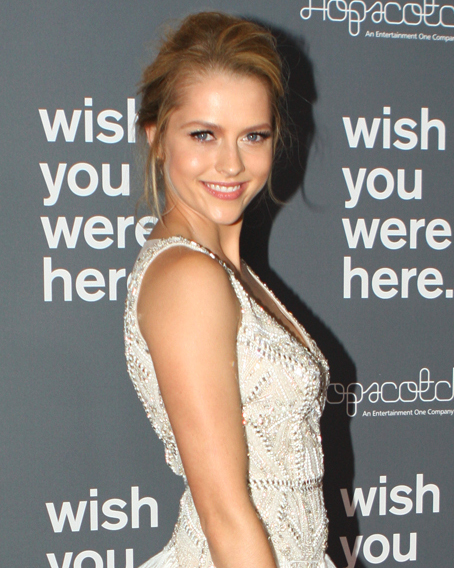
Teresa Palmer

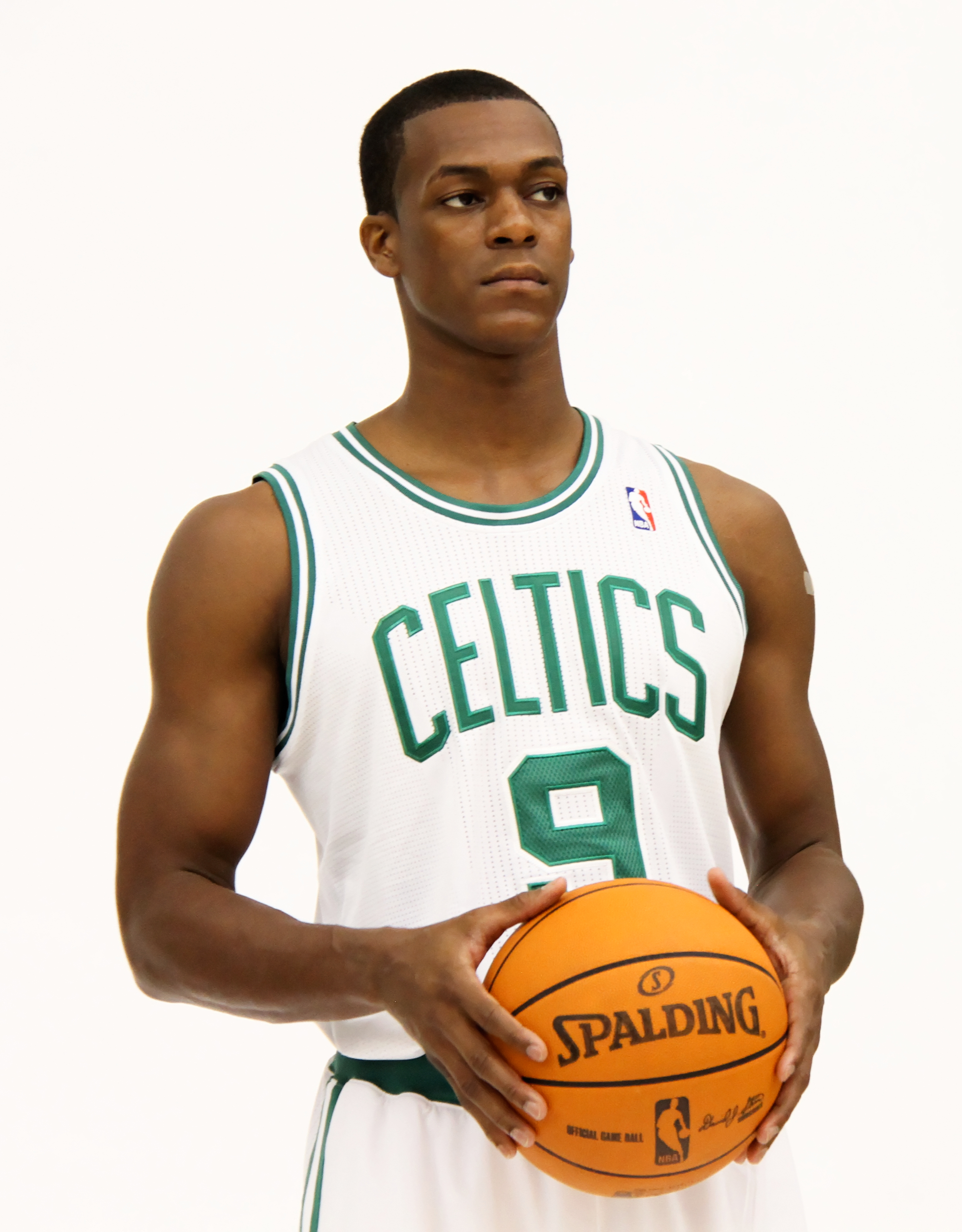
Rajon Rondo

- February 1 – Lauren Conrad, American television personality and fashion designer
- February 2
  - Gemma Arterton, British actress
  - Miwa Asao, Japanese beach volleyball player
- February 5
  - Kevin Gates, American hip-hop musician and entrepreneur
  - Madison Rayne, American professional wrestler
  - Billy Sharp, English footballer
- February 6
  - Vedran Ćorluka, Croatian international footballer
  - Dane DeHaan, American actor
  - Alice Greczyn, American actress and model
  - Sofia Nizharadze, Georgian pop musician
  - Yunho, South Korean actor and singer
- February 8
  - Anna Hutchison, New Zealand actress
  - Anderson .Paak, American musician and record producer
- February 9 – Ciprian Tătărușanu, Romanian footballer
- February 10
  - Radamel Falcao, Colombian footballer
  - Yui Ichikawa, Japanese actress
  - Viktor Troicki, Serbian tennis player
- February 11 – Gabriel Boric, President of Chile
- February 12 – Valorie Curry, American actress
- February 13 – Hamish Bond, New Zealand rower
- February 14
  - Aschwin Wildeboer, Spanish swimmer
  - Tiffany Thornton, American actress, radio personality and singer
- February 15
  - Valeri Bojinov, Bulgarian footballer
  - Ami Koshimizu, Japanese voice actress
  - Amber Riley, American actress, singer and author
- February 16
  - Jessica von Bredow-Werndl, German dressage rider
  - Diego Godín, Uruguayan footballer
- February 17 – Brett Kern, American football player
- February 18
  - Vika Jigulina, Moldovan born-Romanian music producer, dance singer and DJ
  - Alessandra Mastronardi, Italian actress
  - Gregory Vargas, Venezuelan basketball player
- February 19
  - Björn Gustafsson, Swedish comedian
  - Ophelia Lovibond, British actress
  - Marta, Brazilian-born footballer
  - Maria Mena, Norwegian pop singer
- February 21
  - Prince Amedeo of Belgium, Archduke of Austria-Este, member of the Belgian royal family
  - Charlotte Church, Welsh singer, actress, and television presenter
- February 22
  - Miko Hughes, American actor
  - Rajon Rondo, American basketball player
- February 23
  - Skylar Grey, American pop singer
  - Kazuya Kamenashi, Japanese singer-songwriter and actor
  - Jerod Mayo, American football player
  - Ola Svensson, Swedish pop singer
- February 24 – Milcah Chemos Cheywa, Kenyan middle-distance runner
- February 25
  - Danny Saucedo, Swedish pop and dance singer
  - Justin Berfield, American actor, writer, and producer
  - James and Oliver Phelps, English actors
- February 26
  - Leila Lopes, Angolan Miss Universe
  - Crystal Kay, Japanese actress and pop singer
  - Teresa Palmer, Australian actress, writer, model and film producer

=== March ===
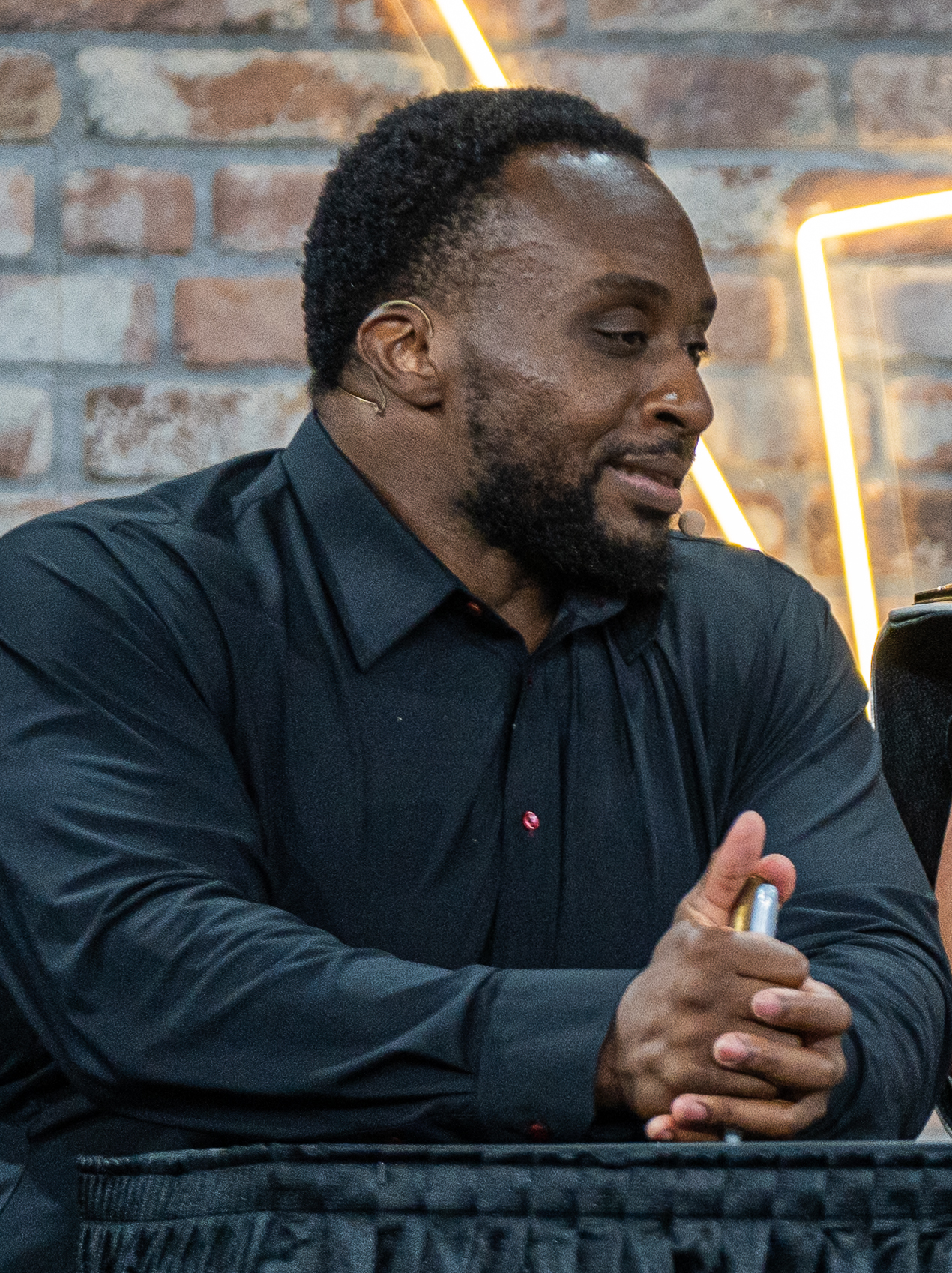
Big E

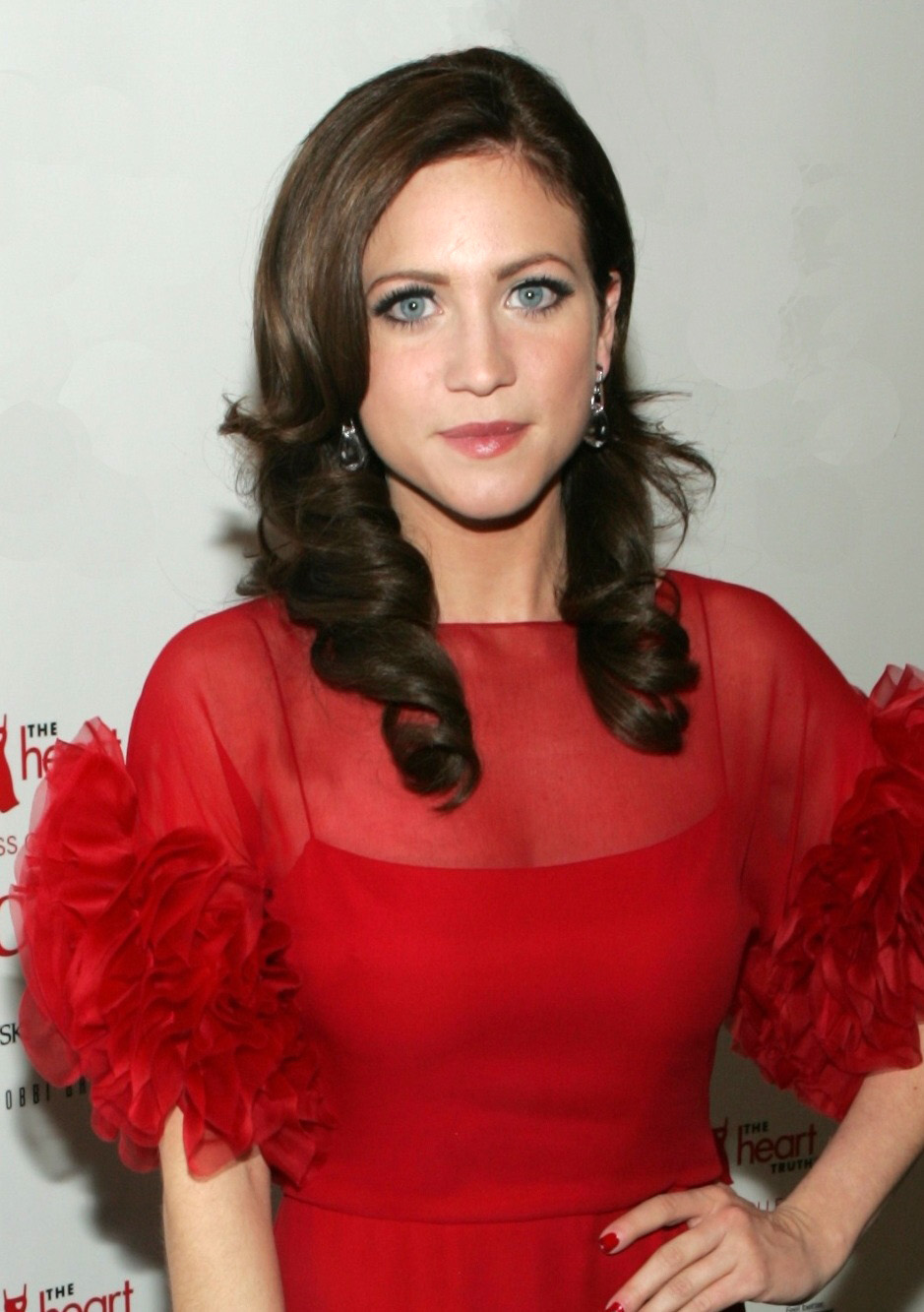
Brittany Snow

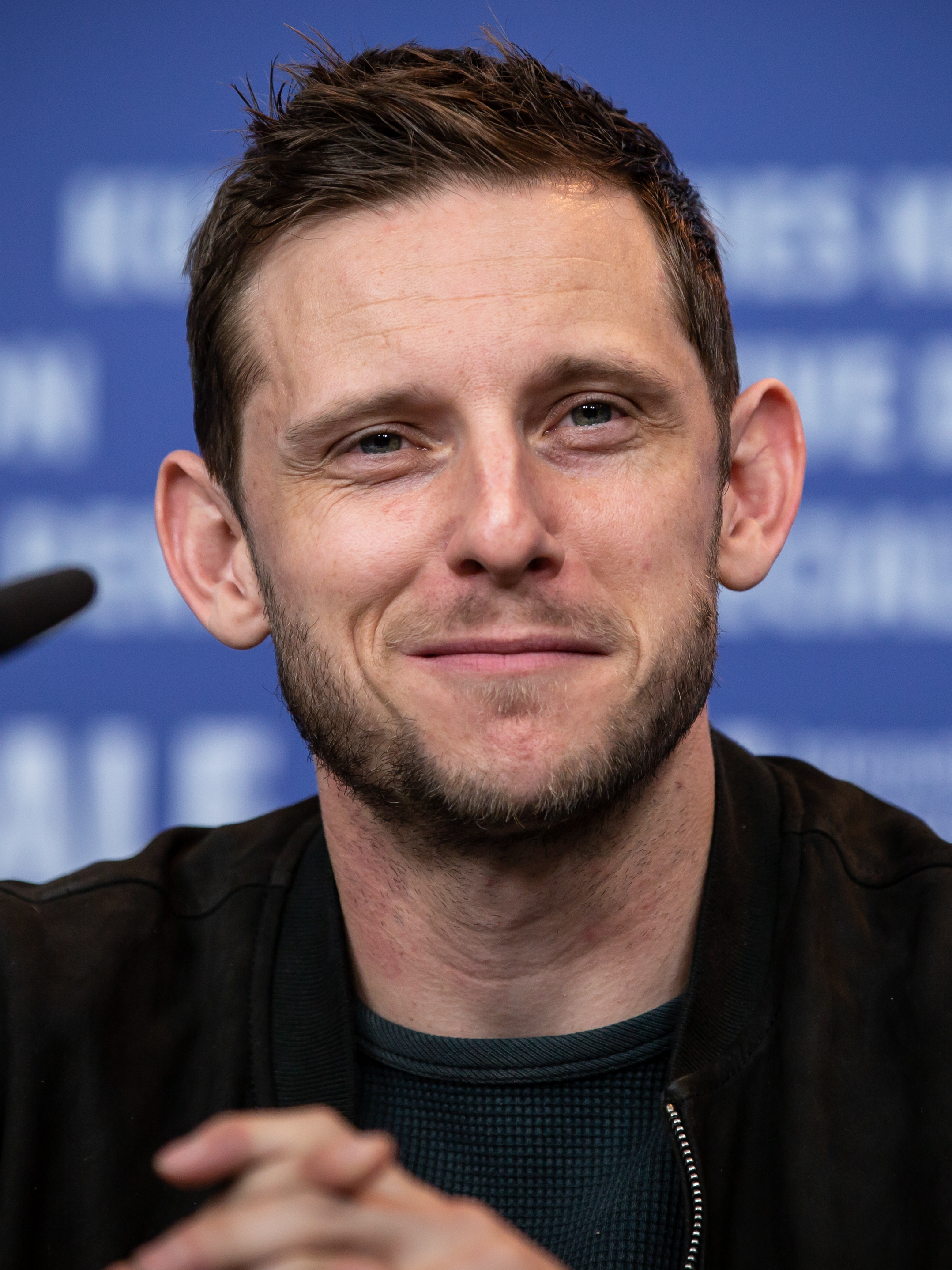
Jamie Bell

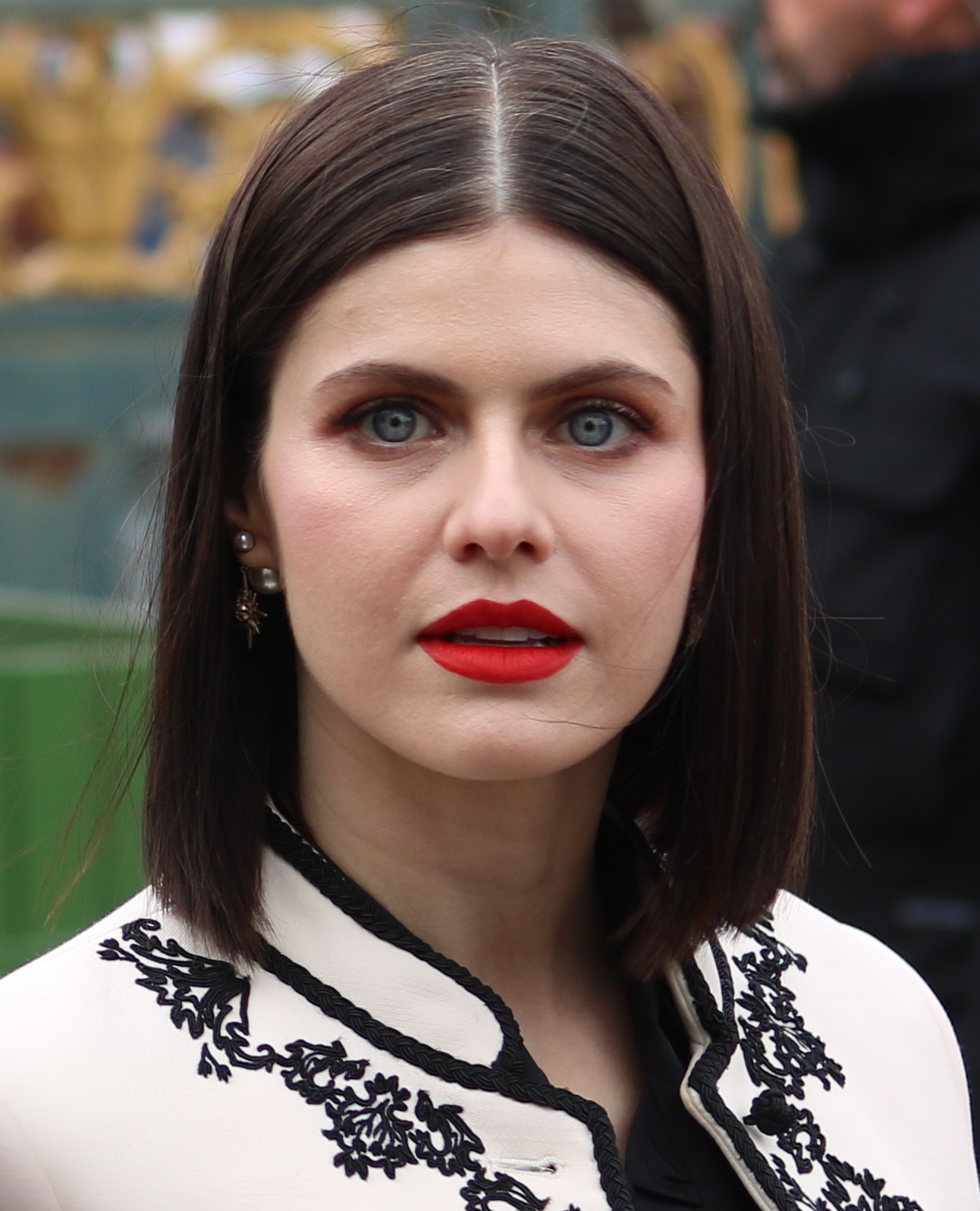
Alexandra Daddario

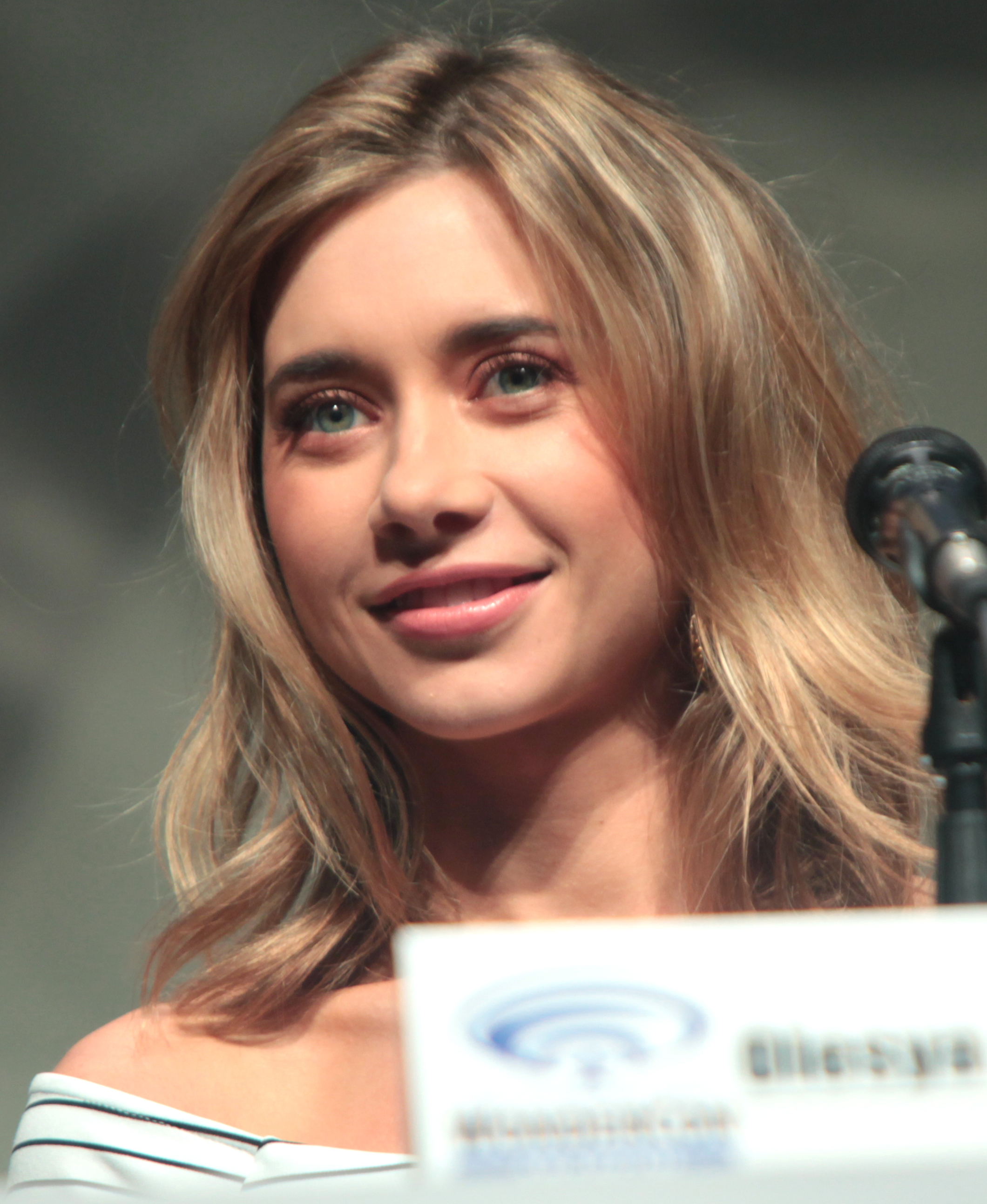
Olesya Rulin

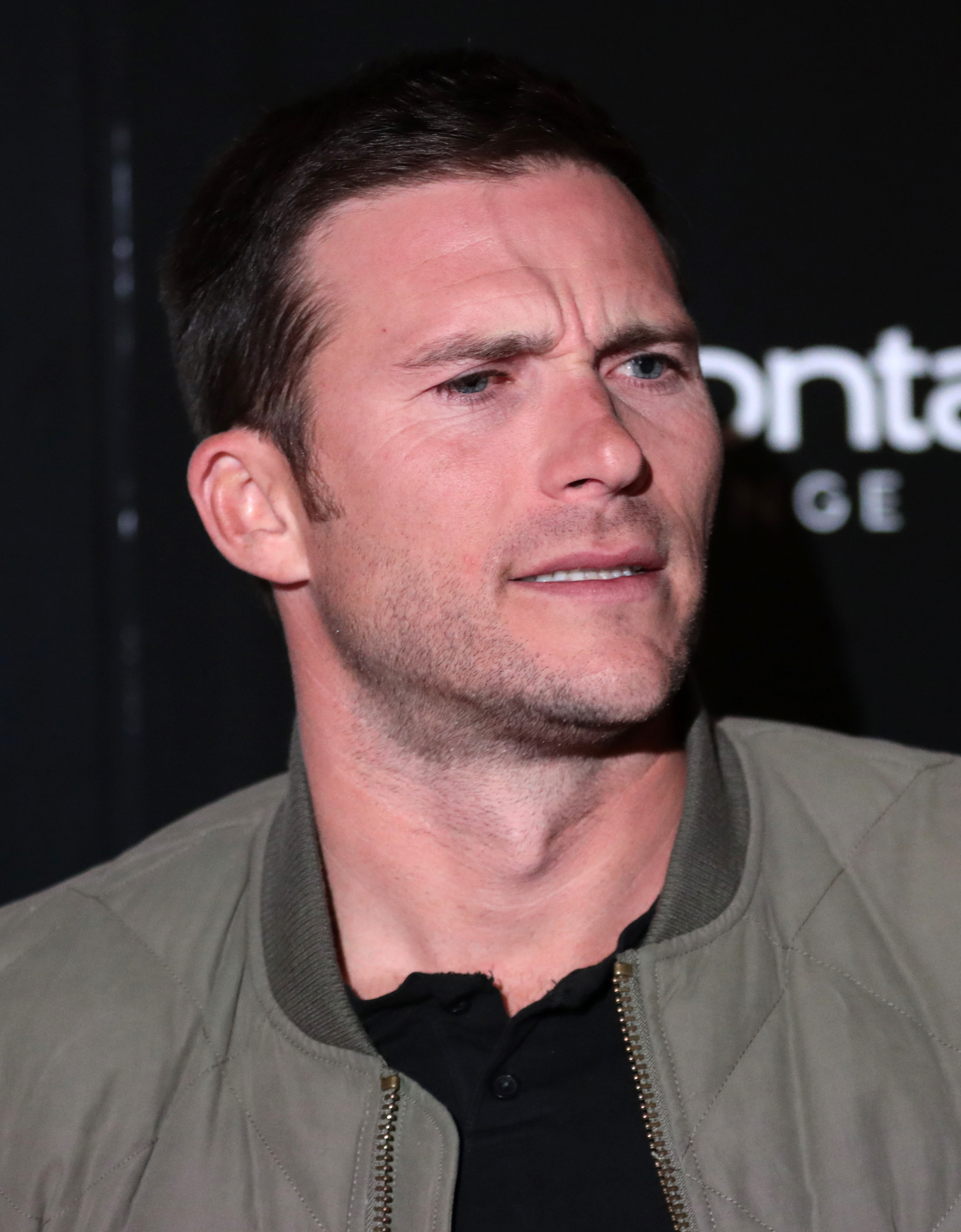
Scott Eastwood

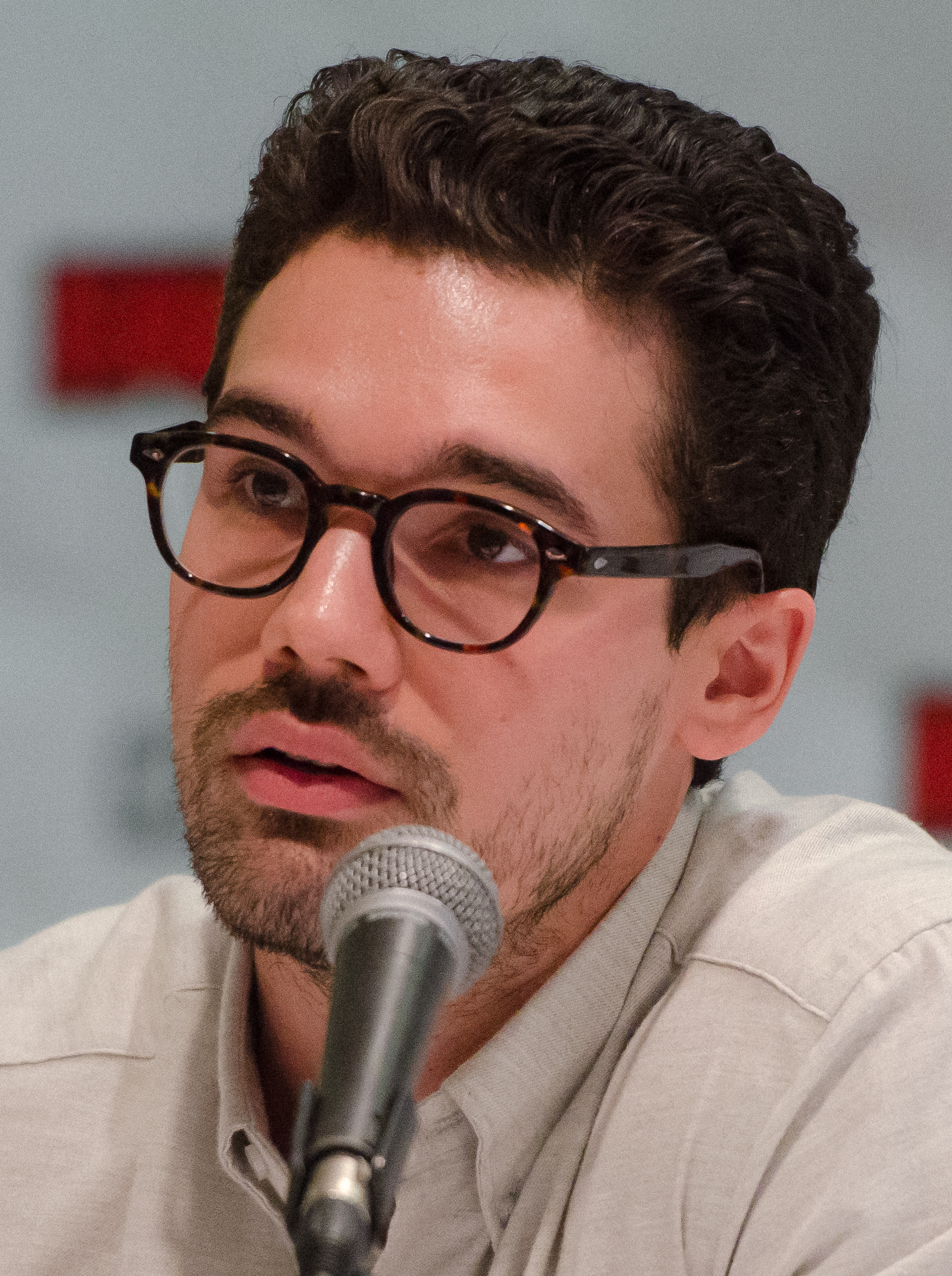
Steven Strait

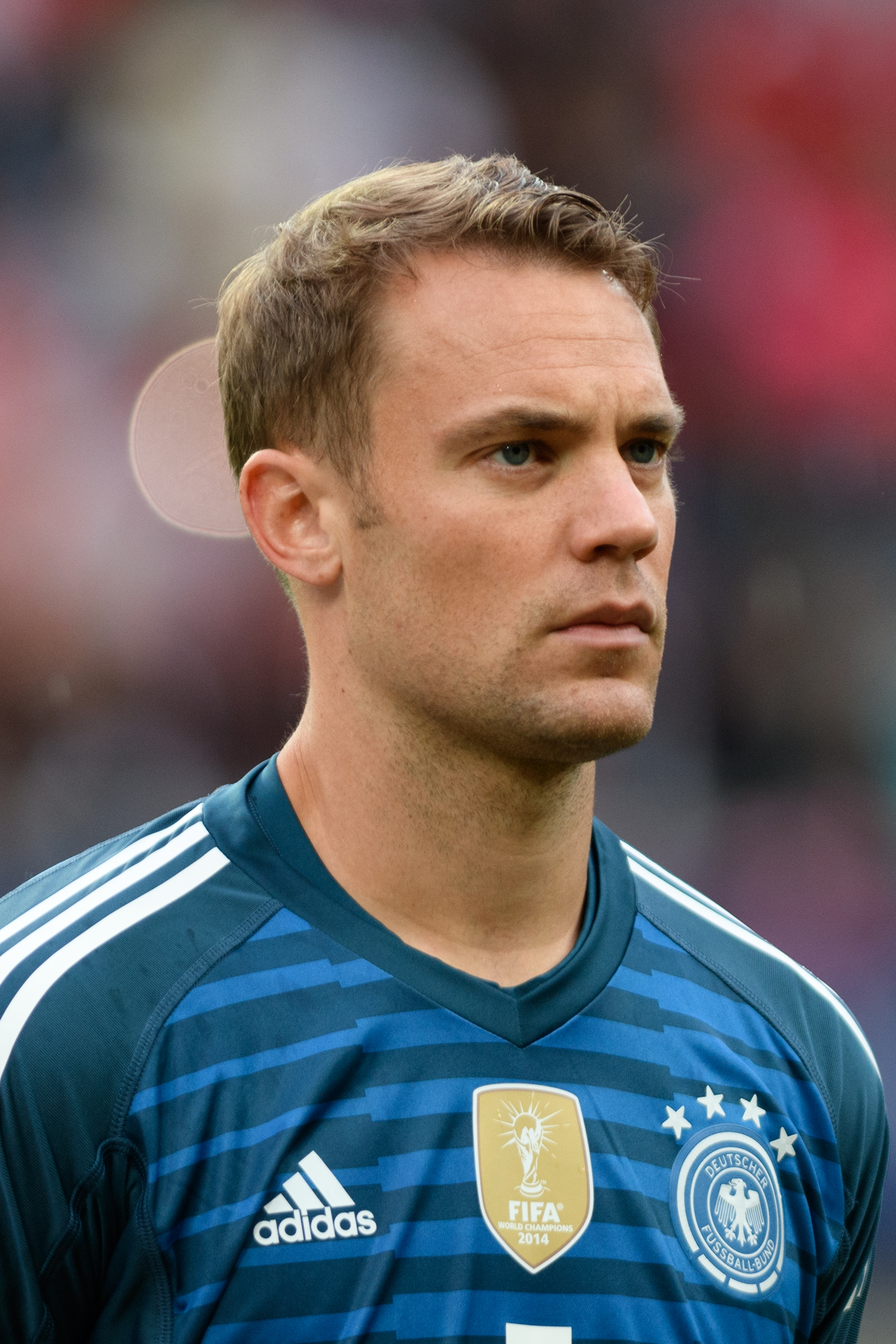
Manuel Neuer

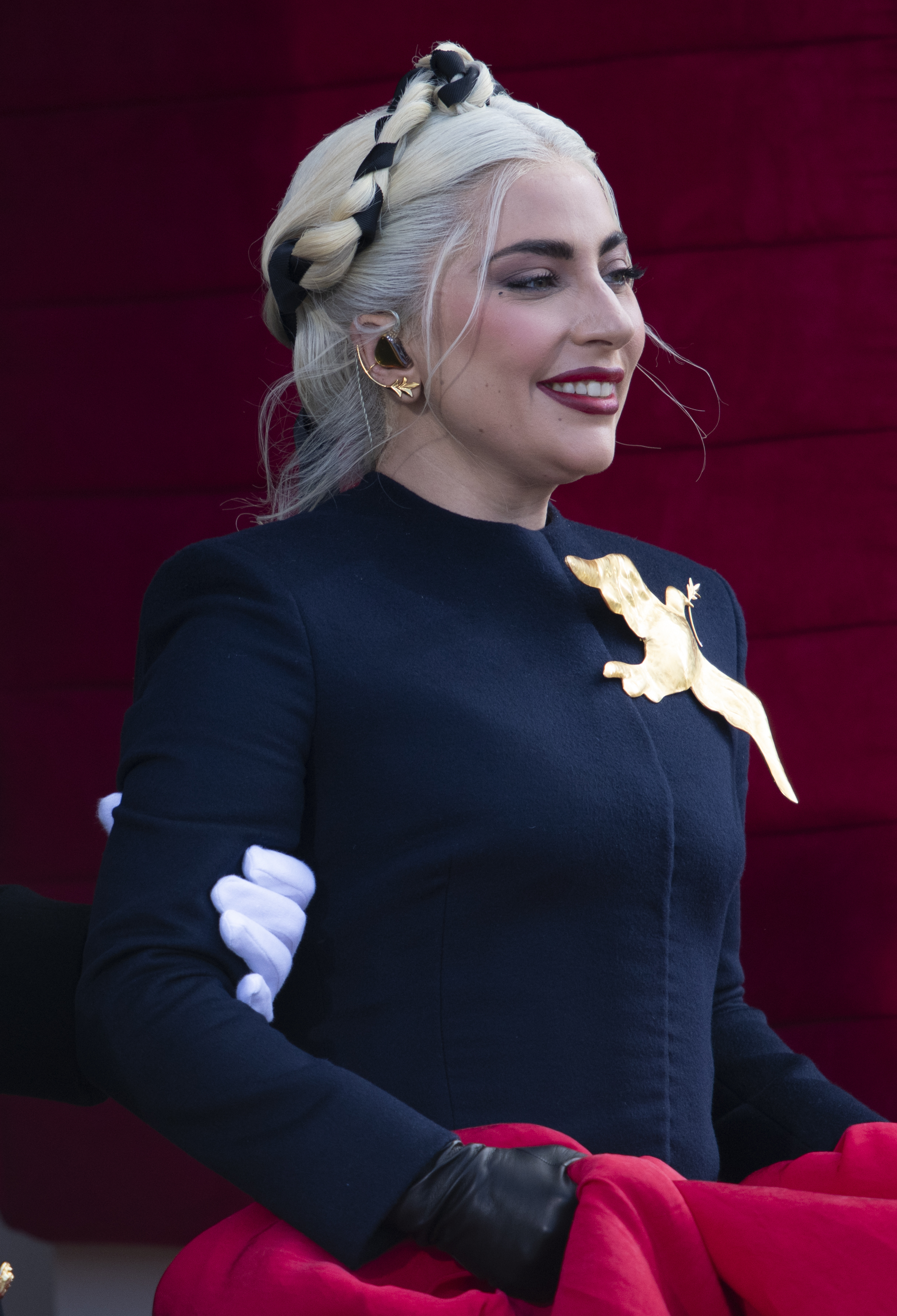
Lady Gaga

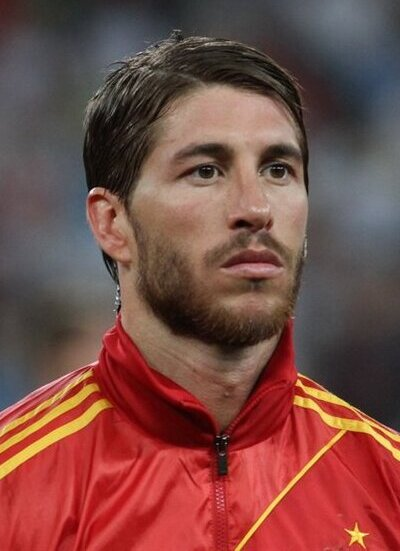
Sergio Ramos

- March 1
  - Big E
  - Ayumu Goromaru, Japanese rugby union player
  - Jonathan Spector, American soccer player
- March 2 – Ethan Peck, American actor
- March 3
  - Stacie Orrico, American singer
  - Mehmet Topal, Turkish footballer
- March 4 – Margo Harshman, American actress
- March 5
  - Corey Brewer, American basketball player
  - Julie Henderson, American model
  - Sarah J. Maas, American novelist
  - Mika Newton, Ukrainian singer
  - Shikabala, Egyptian footballer
- March 6
  - Francisco Cervelli, Venezuelan baseball player
  - Eli Marienthal, American actor
  - Charlie Mulgrew, Scottish footballer
  - Lucas Saatkamp, Brazilian volleyball player
- March 8
  - Tal Slutzker, Israeli painter and poet
  - Princess Tsuguko of Takamado, member of the Japanese imperial family
- March 9 – Brittany Snow, American actress, producer, director and singer
- March 11
  - Dario Cologna, Swiss Olympic skier
  - Ed Gamble, English comedian
  - Mariko Shinoda, Japanese singer, actress, fashion model, and idol
- March 12
  - Danny Jones, British musician
  - František Rajtoral, Czech footballer (d. 2017)
- March 13 – Silvija Popović, Serbian volleyball player
- March 14 – Jamie Bell, English actor and dancer
- March 15 – Jai Courtney, Australian actor
- March 16
  - Alexandra Daddario, American actress
  - Ken Doane, American professional wrestler
  - Daisuke Takahashi, Japanese figure skater
- March 17
  - Edin Džeko, Bosnian footballer
  - Olesya Rulin, Russian-born actress
- March 18
  - Lykke Li, Swedish singer-songwriter
  - Cory Schneider, American Ice Hockey player
- March 19 – Anne Vyalitsyna, Russian model
- March 20 – Ruby Rose, Australian actress and model
- March 21
  - Scott Eastwood, American actor
  - Michu, Spanish footballer
- March 22 – Matt Nicholls, English drummer
- March 23
  - Brett Eldredge, American country music singer
  - Steven Strait, American musician, actor, and fashion model
- March 24
  - Valentin Chmerkovskiy, Ukrainian-American dancer
  - Nathalia Dill, Brazilian actress
  - Anxhela Peristeri, Albanian singer and songwriter
- March 25
  - Marco Belinelli, Italian basketball player
  - Megan Gibson-Loftin, American softball player
  - Kyle Lowry, American basketball player
- March 26
  - Jonny Craig, Canadian-American singer
  - Jessica Hart, Australian model
  - Misty Stone, American pornographic actress
  - Alexander Taraikovsky, Belarusian demonstrator (d. 2020)
- March 27
  - SoCal Val, American professional wrestling personality
  - Manuel Neuer, German football goalkeeper
- March 28
  - Lady Gaga, American singer, songwriter and actress
  - Bowe Bergdahl, American soldier and deserter captured by the Taliban
  - Amaia Salamanca, Spanish actress and model
  - Barbora Strýcová, Czech tennis player
- March 29
  - Lucas Elliot Eberl, American actor and director
  - Romina Oprandi, Italian tennis player
- March 30
  - Beni, Japanese singer
  - Tessa Ferrer, American actress
  - Sergio Ramos, Spanish footballer

=== April ===
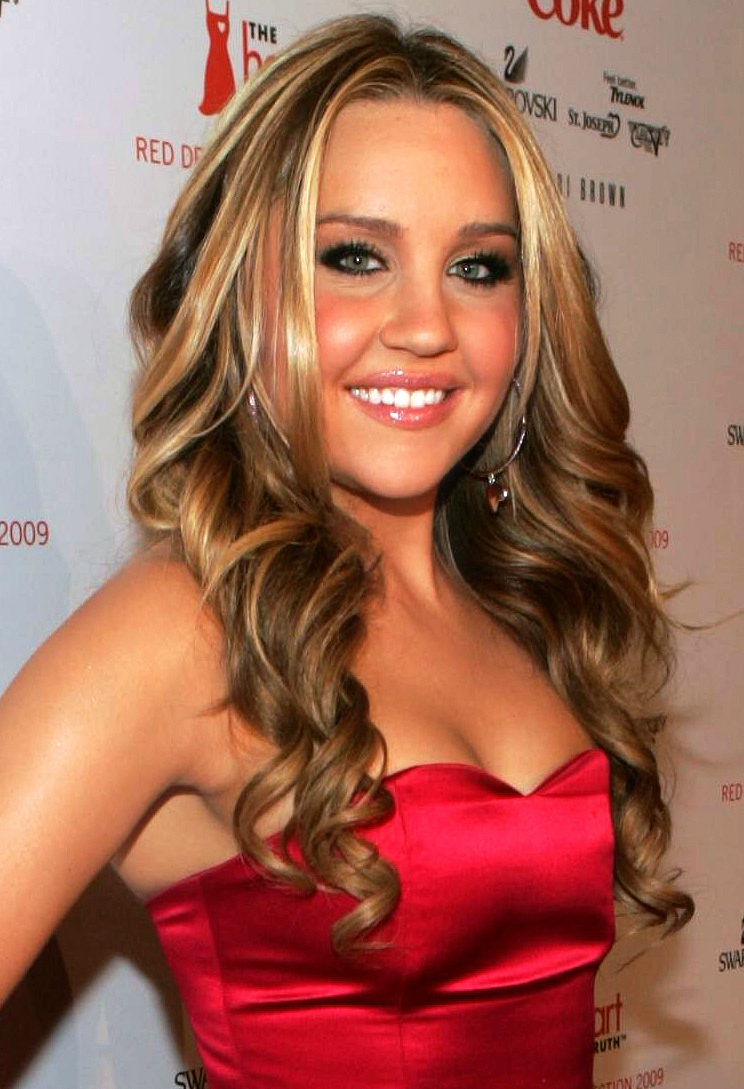
Amanda Bynes

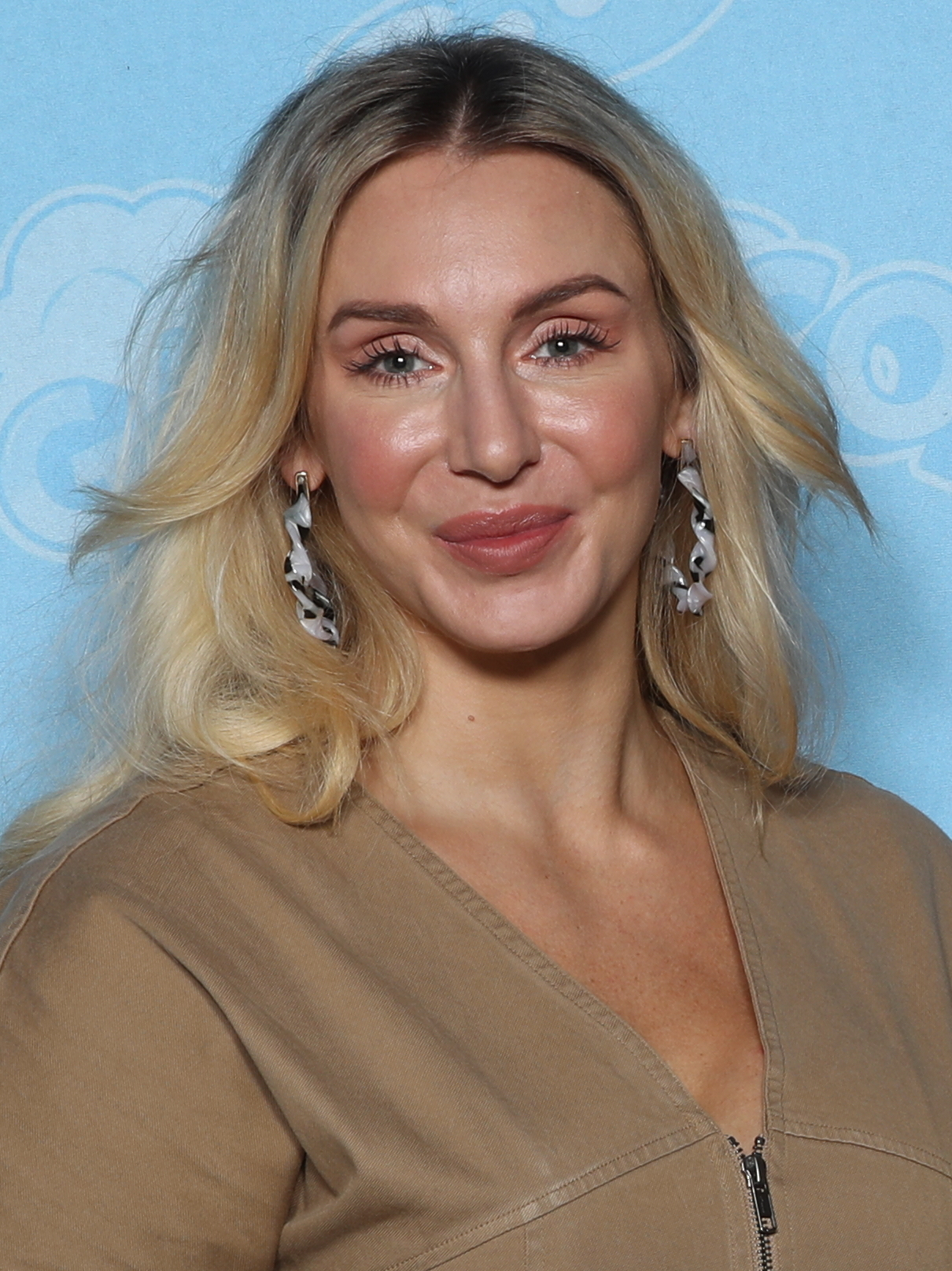
Charlotte Flair

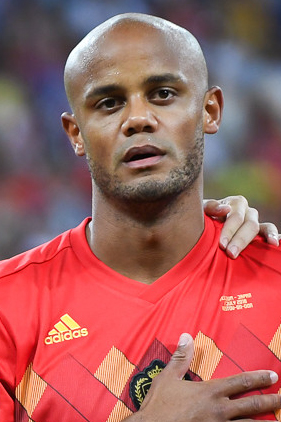
Vincent Kompany

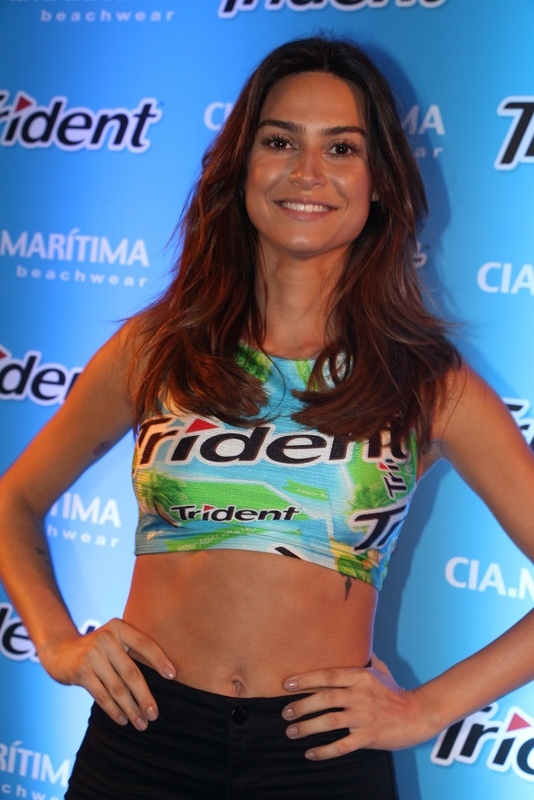
Thaila Ayala

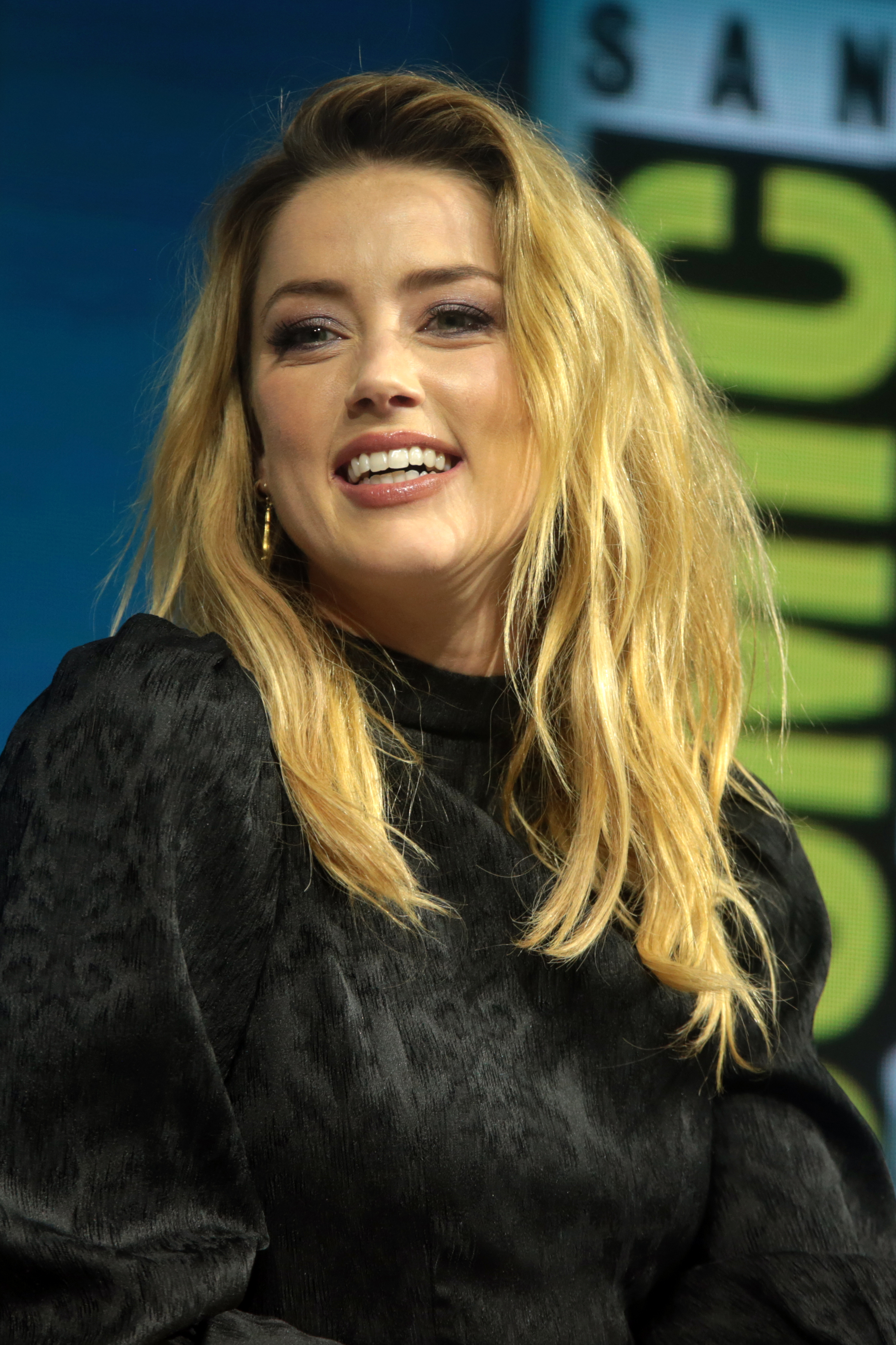
Amber Heard

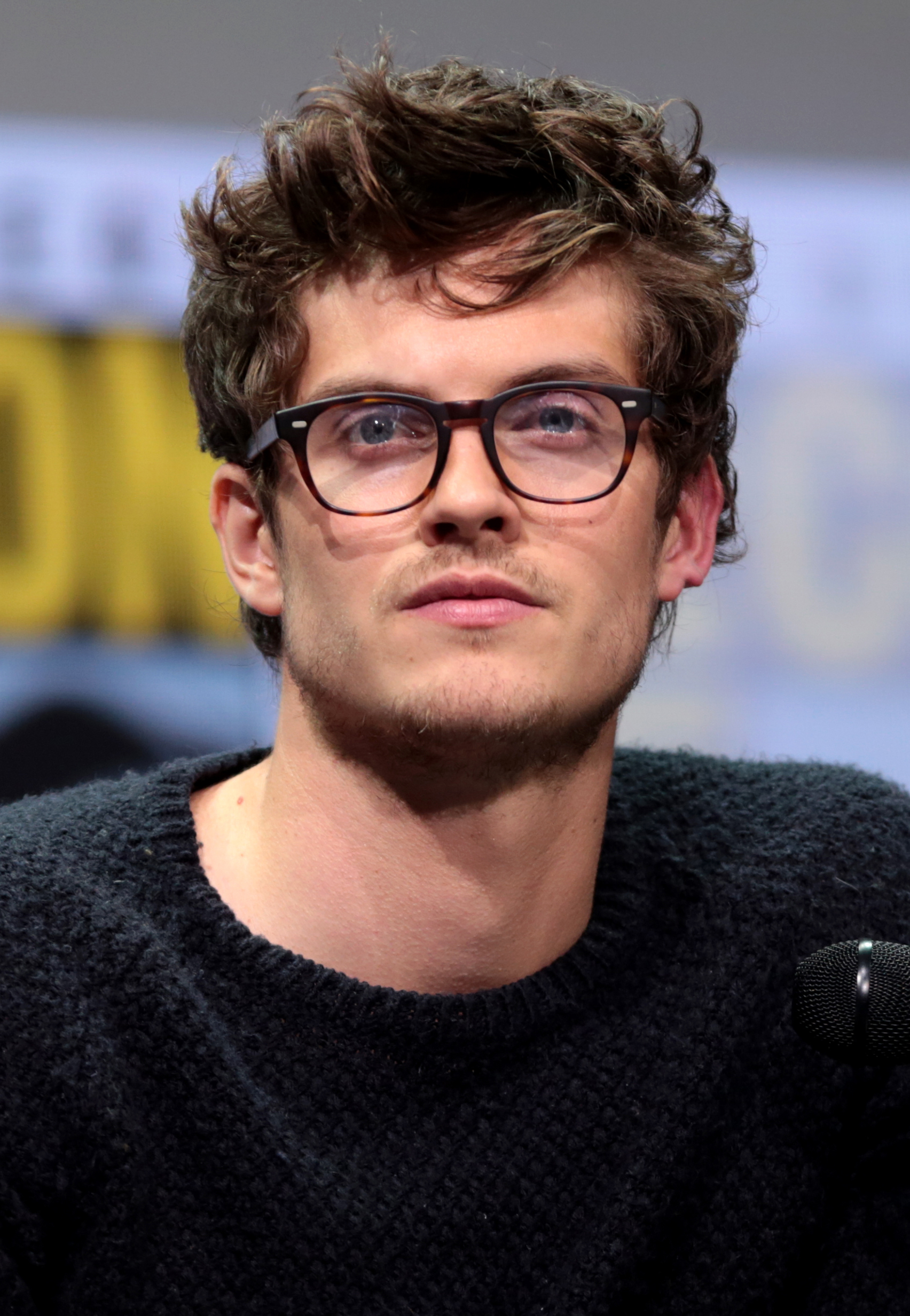
Daniel Sharman

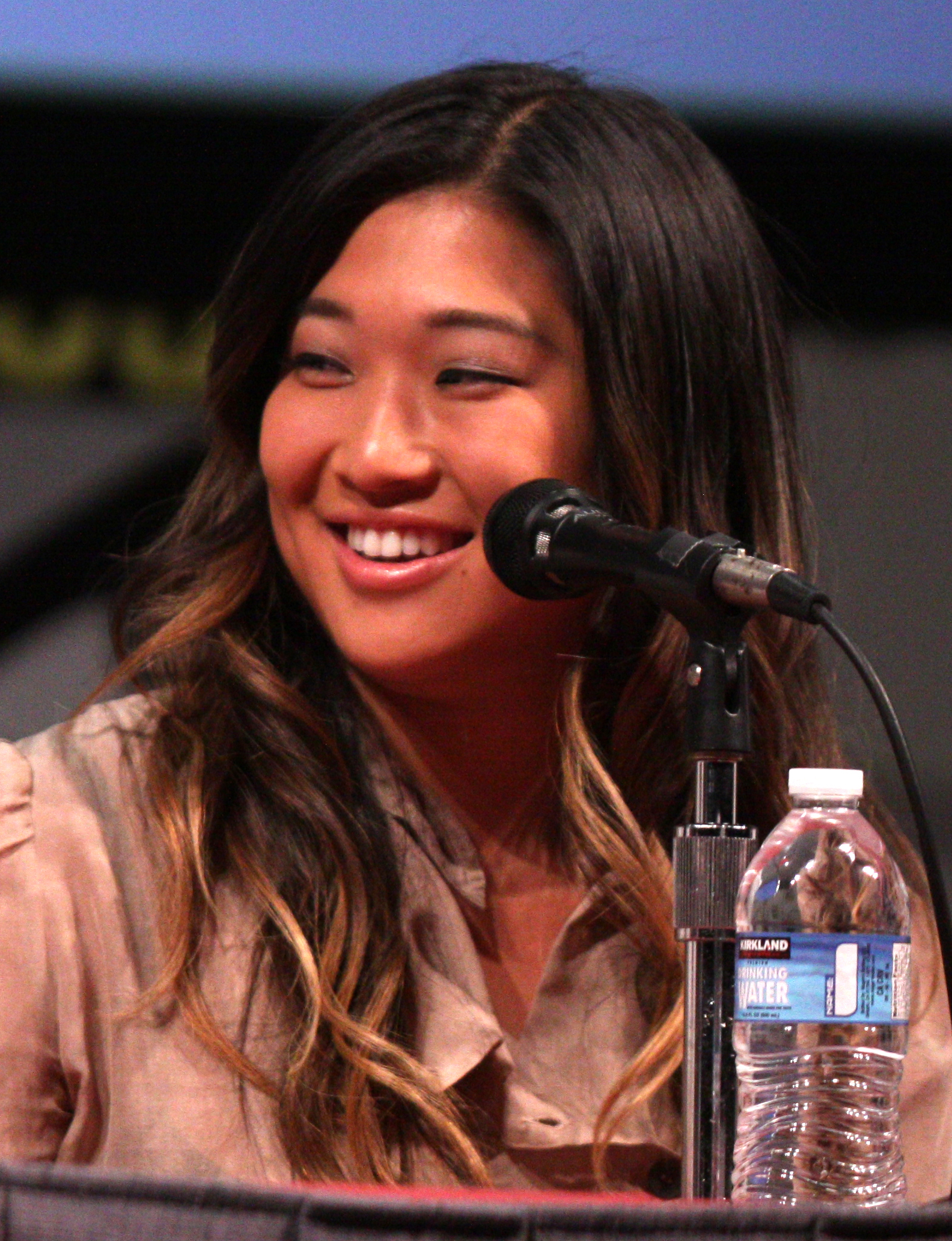
Jenna Ushkowitz

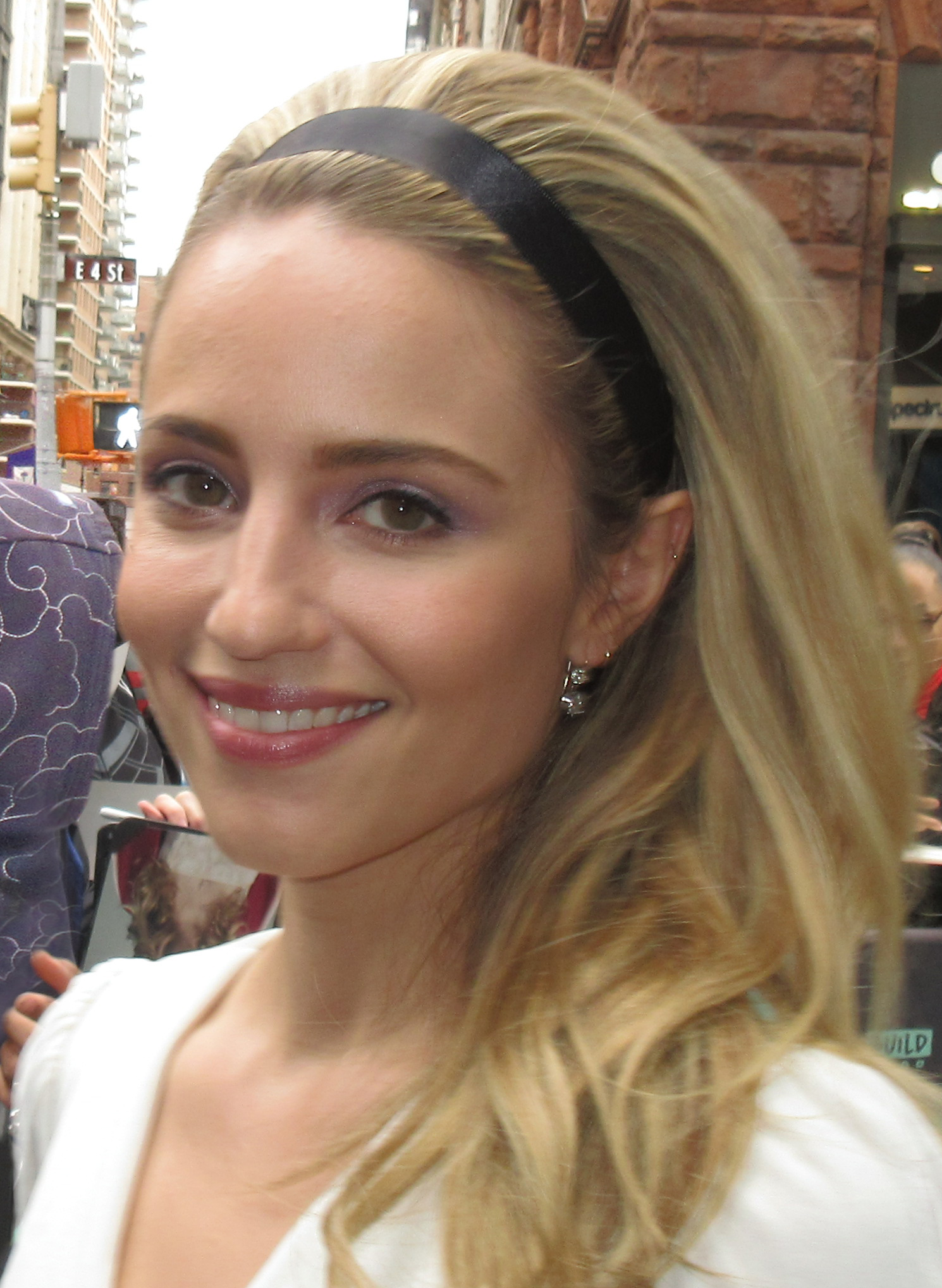
Dianna Agron

- April 1
  - Kid Ink, American hip-hop musician
  - Özge Özpirinçci, Turkish actress
  - Hillary Scott, American musician
  - Ireen Wüst, Dutch speed skater
- April 2
  - Lee DeWyze, American rock musician
  - Drew Van Acker, American actor
- April 3
  - Amanda Bynes, American actress and fashion designer
  - Coleen Rooney, English media personality
- April 4
  - Eunhyuk, South Korean actor and singer
  - Labinot Harbuzi, Swedish footballer (d. 2018)
  - Jason Richardson, American hurdler
- April 5, Charlotte Flair, American professional wrestler
- April 7
  - Choi Si-won, South Korean actor and singer
  - Yu Yang, Chinese badminton player
- April 8
  - Igor Akinfeev, Russian footballer
  - Cliff Avril, American football player
  - Félix Hernández, Venezuelan baseball player
  - Natalia Ishchenko, Russian synchronized swimmer
  - Erika Sawajiri, Japanese actress, singer, and model
- April 9
  - Leighton Meester, American actress
  - Jordan Masterson, American actor
- April 10
  - Sam Attwater, British actor
  - Fernando Gago, Argentine footballer
  - Vincent Kompany, Belgian footballer
- April 12
  - Blerim Džemaili, SR Macedonia-born Swiss footballer
  - Marcel Granollers, Spanish tennis player
  - Matt McGorry, American actor and activist
- April 14 – Thaila Ayala, Brazilian actress and model
- April 15 – Tom Heaton, English footballer
- April 16
  - Sufe Bradshaw, American actress
  - Shinji Okazaki, Japanese football player
  - Paul Di Resta, British racing driver
- April 17
  - Romain Grosjean, French racing driver
  - Zheng Kai, Chinese actor
- April 18 – Maurice Edu, American footballer
- April 19 – Candace Parker, American basketball player
- April 22
  - Amber Heard, American actress
  - Marshawn Lynch, American football player
- April 23
  - Sven Kramer, Dutch speed skater
  - Jessica Stam, Canadian model
- April 24
  - Kellin Quinn, American singer and musician
  - Tahyna Tozzi, Australian model, singer and actress
- April 25
  - Gwen Jorgensen, American triathlete
  - Daniel Sharman, English actor
- April 26 – Juan Sebastián Cabal, Colombian tennis player
- April 27
  - Jenna Coleman, British actress
  - Dinara Safina, Russian tennis player
- April 28
  - Jenna Ushkowitz, American stage and television actress and singer
  - Jazmín Beccar Varela, Argentine actress
- April 30
  - Dianna Agron, American actress, singer and dancer
  - Zhang Nan, Chinese artistic gymnast

=== May ===
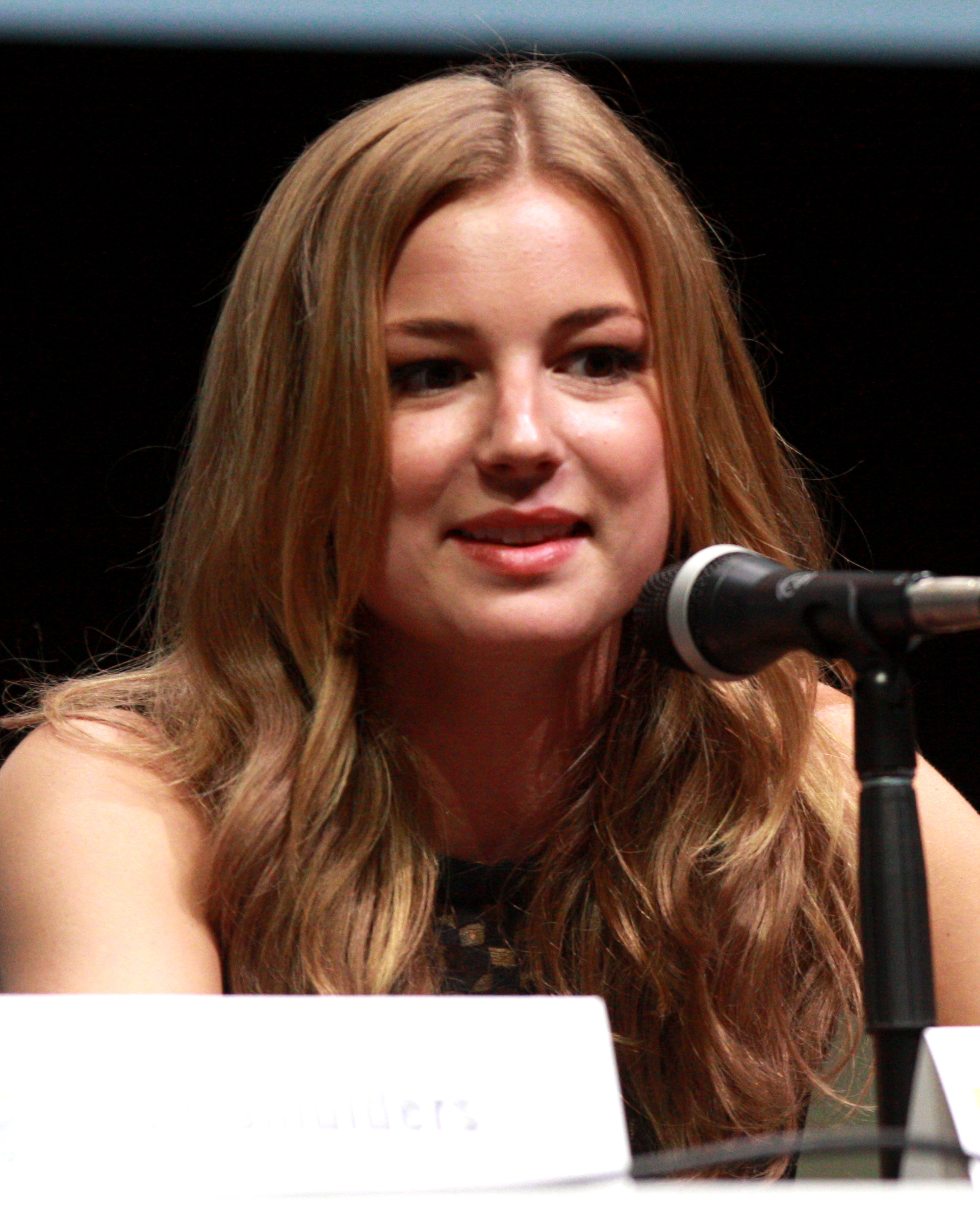
Emily VanCamp

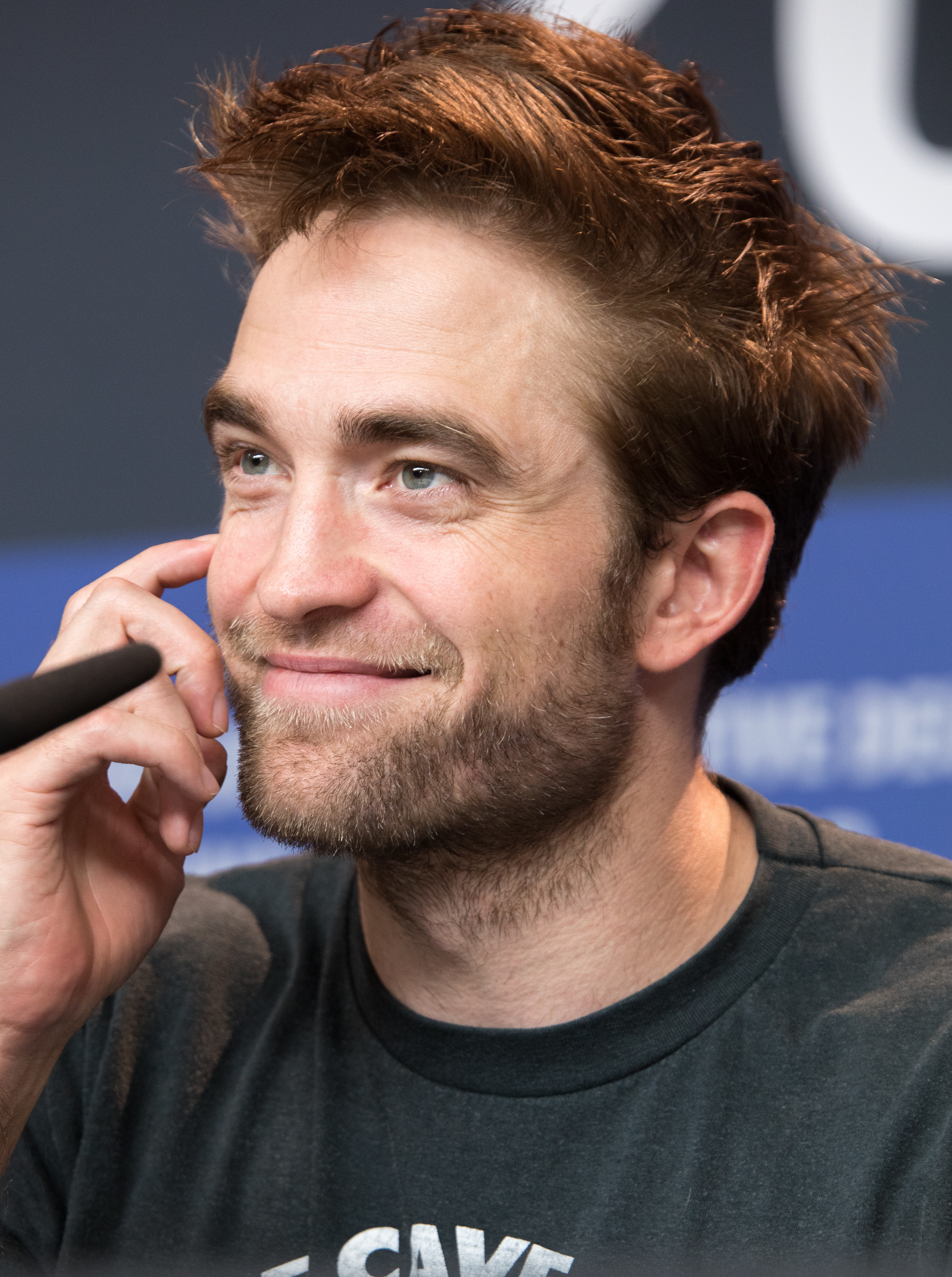
Robert Pattinson

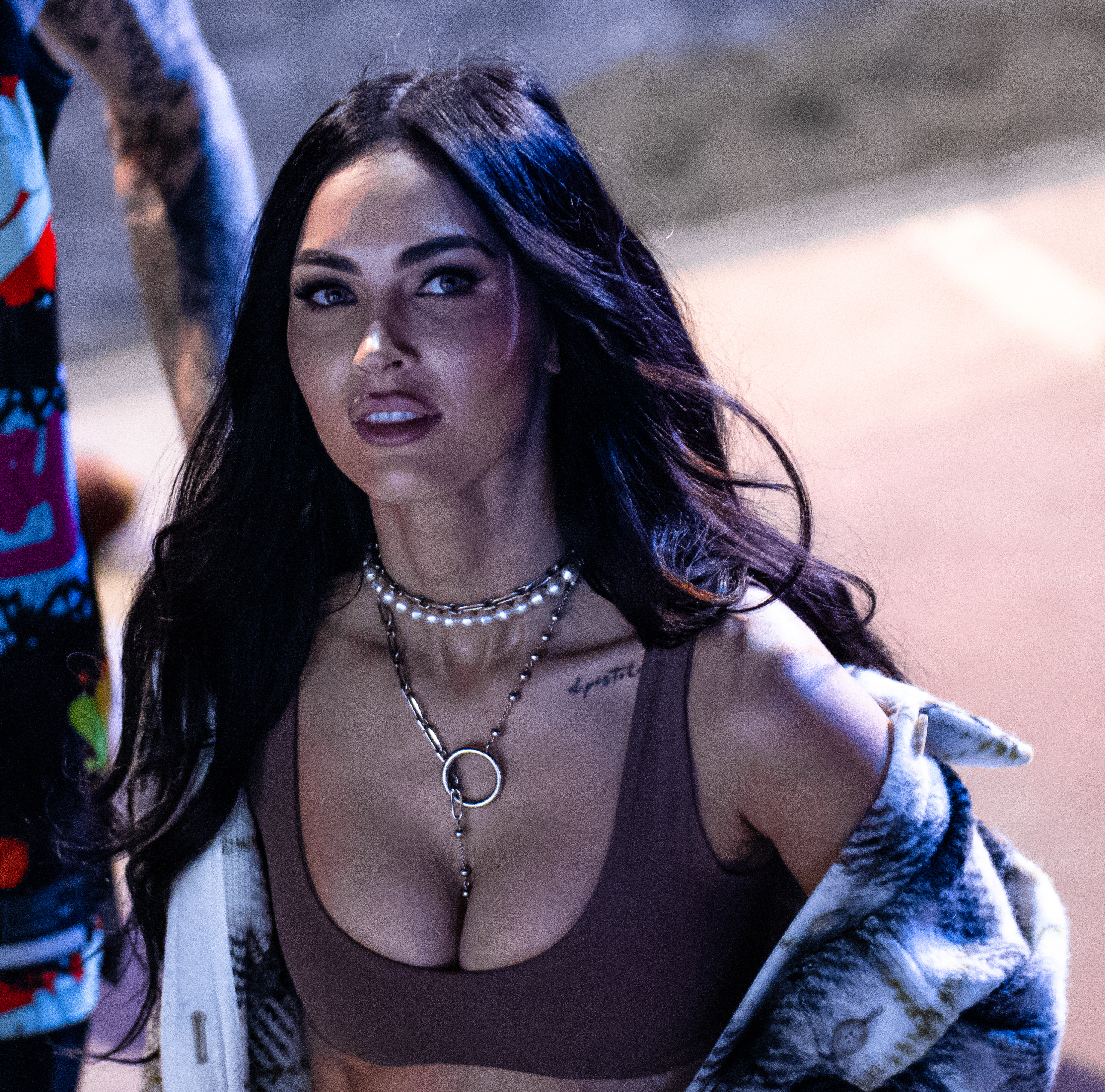
Megan Fox

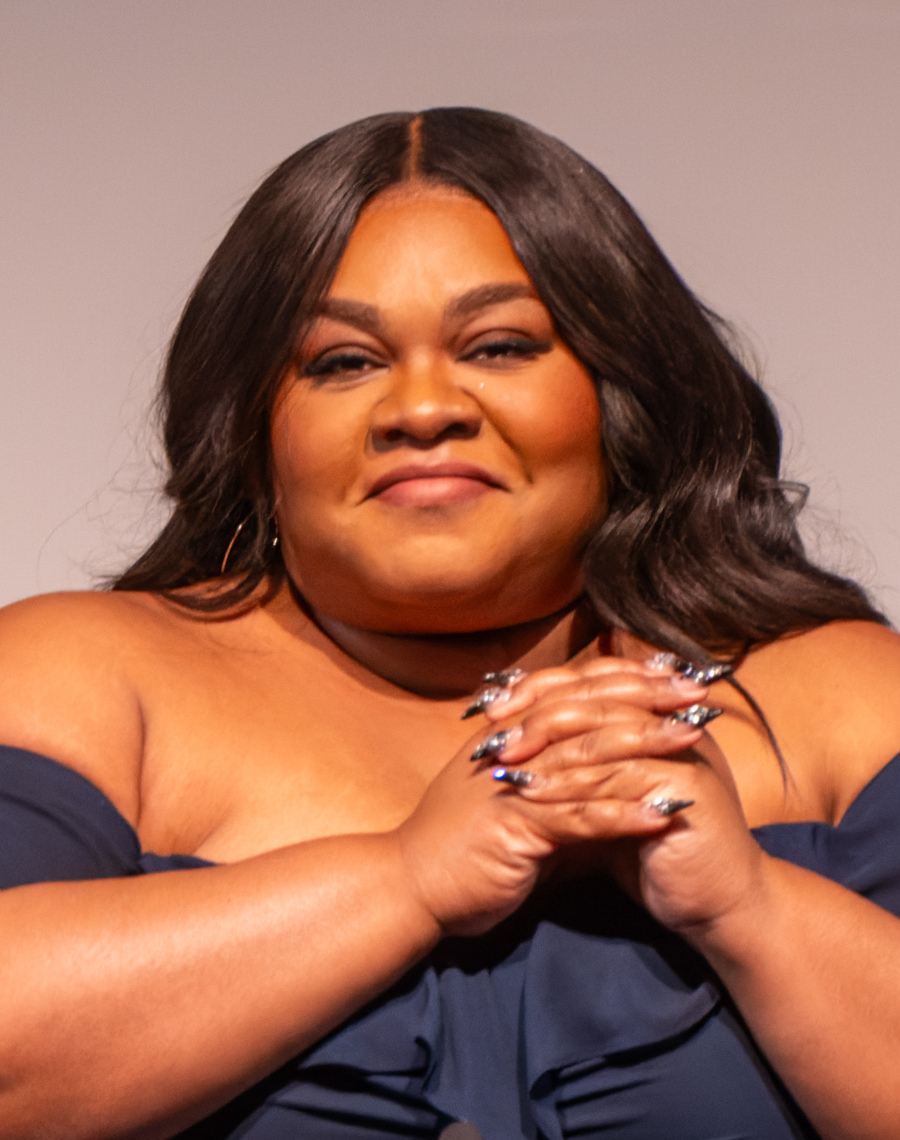
Da'Vine Joy Randolph

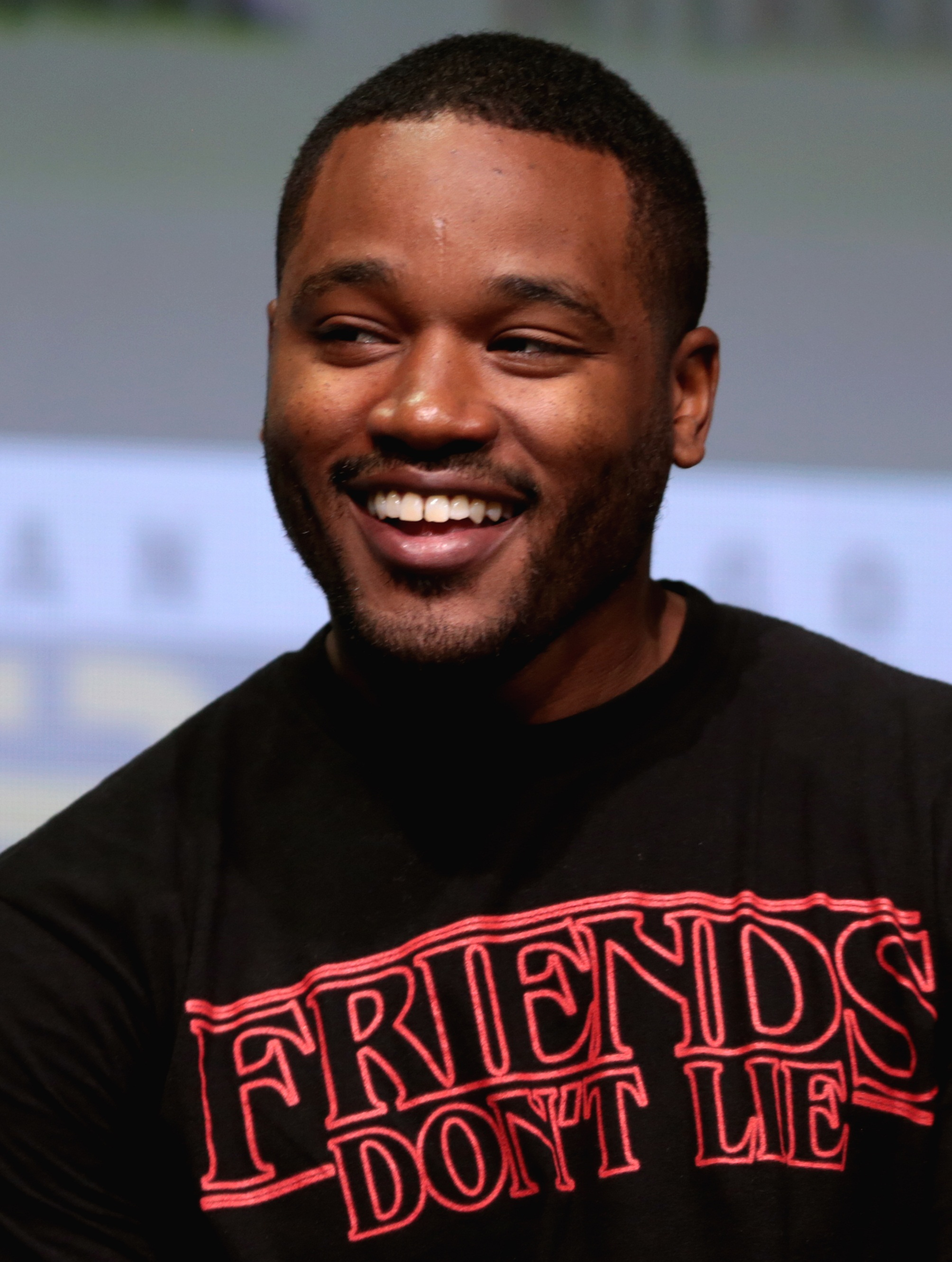
Ryan Coogler

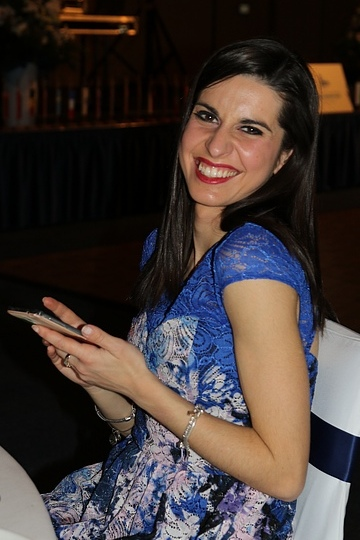
Valentina Marchei

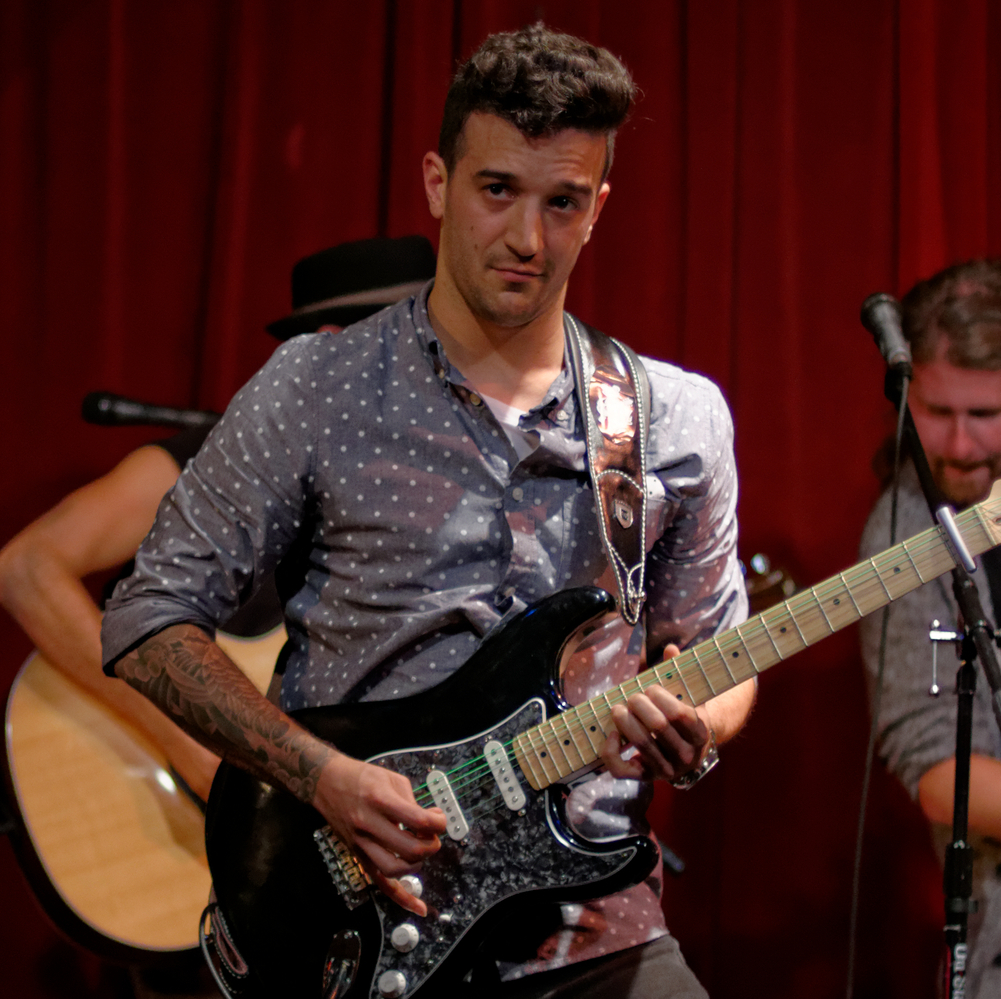
Mark Ballas

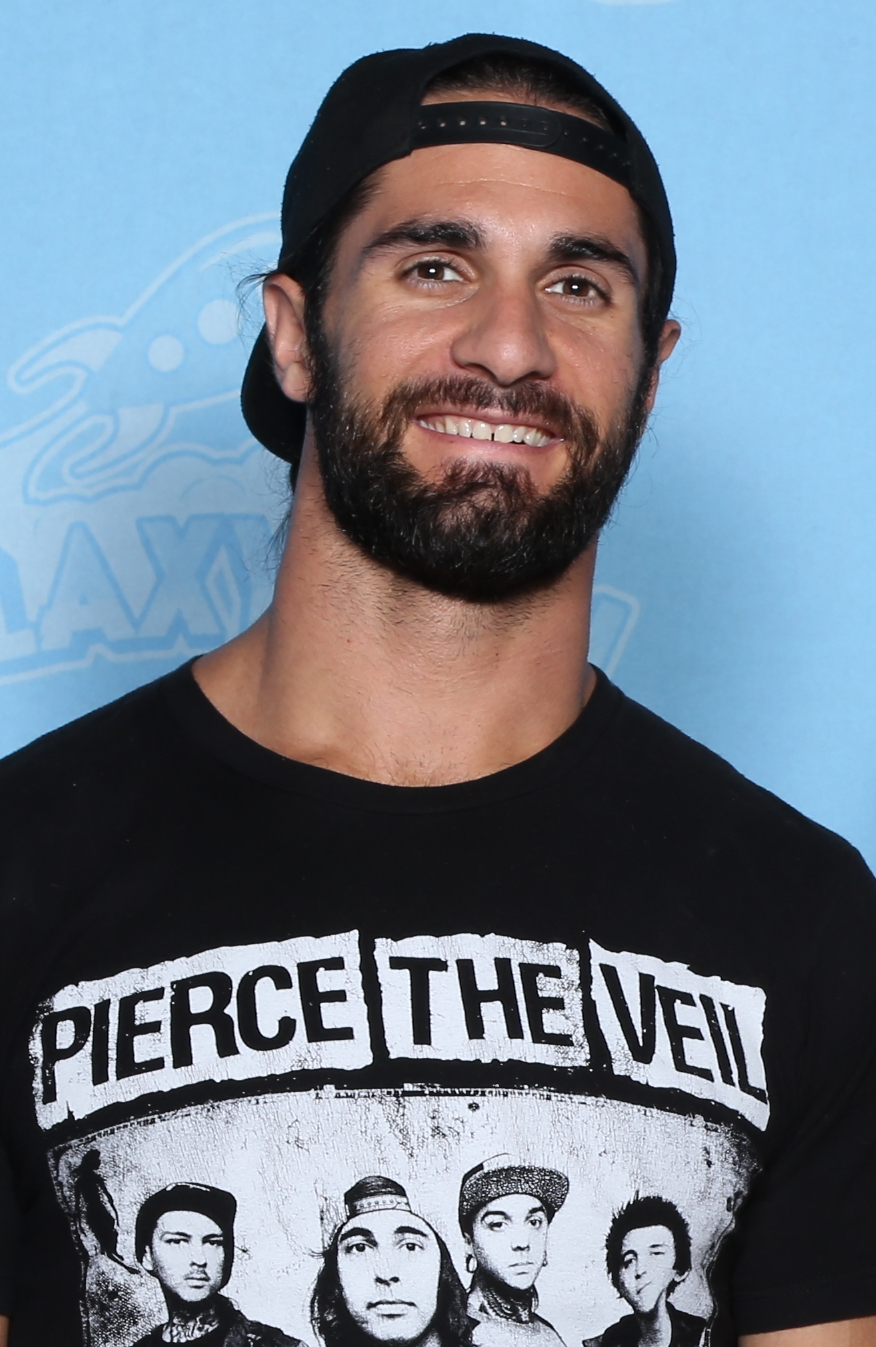
Seth Rollins

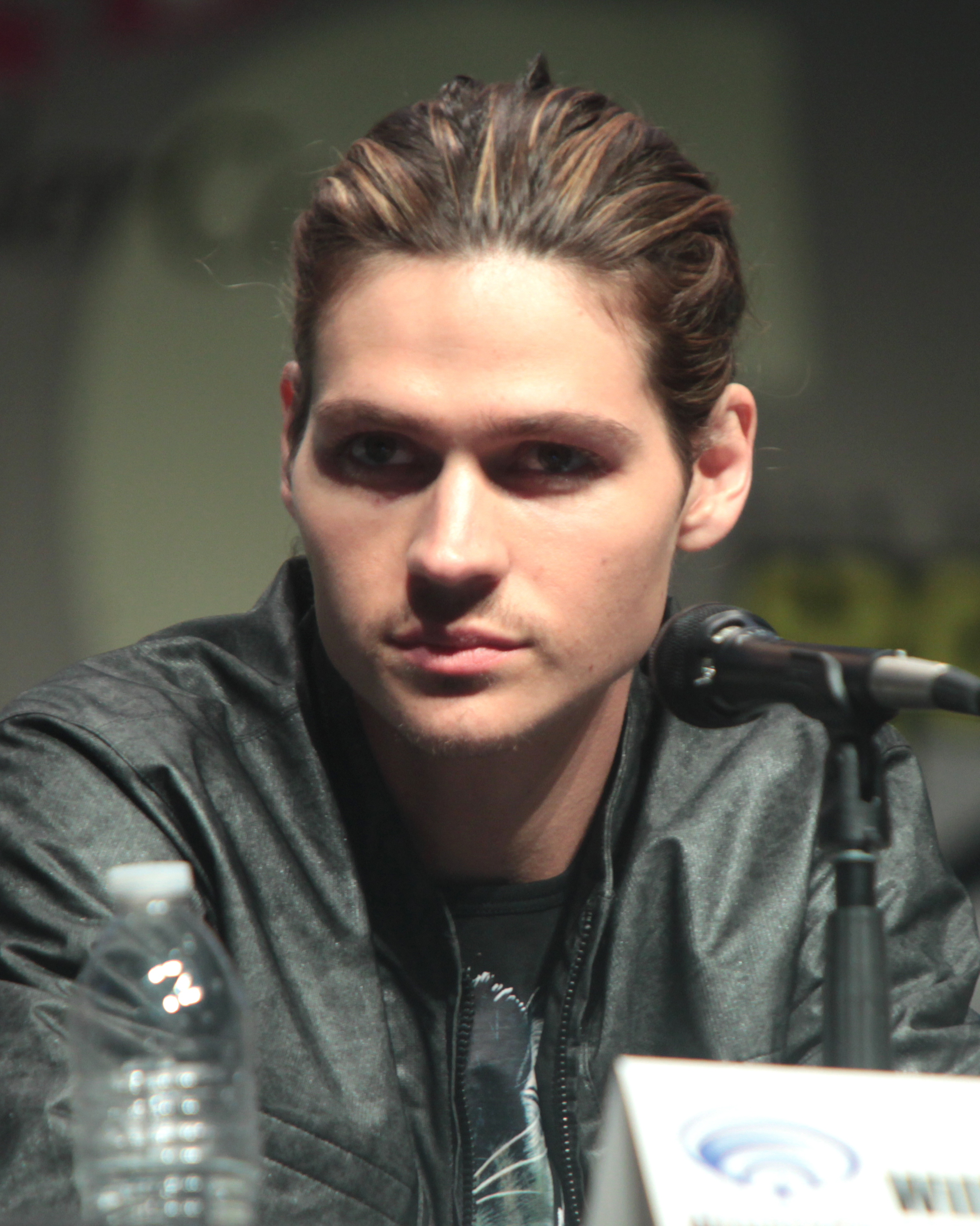
Will Peltz

- May 1
  - Christian Benítez, Ecuadorian footballer (d. 2013)
  - Jesse Klaver, Dutch politician
  - Diego Valeri, Argentine footballer
  - Cassie Jaye, American actress and film director
- May 2
  - Sani Kaita, Nigerian footballer
  - Thomas McDonell, American actor, musician, and artist
- May 5 – Grace Wong, Hong Kong actress and beauty pageant contestant
- May 6
  - Gims, Congolese born-French rapper
  - Tyler Hynes, Canadian actor and filmmaker
  - Sasheer Zamata, American actress and comedian
- May 8
  - Galen Rupp, American long distance and marathon runner
  - Laura Spencer, American actress
- May 10 – Fernanda Garay, Brazilian volleyball player
- May 12
  - Jonathan Orozco, Mexican footballer
  - Christinna Pedersen, Danish badminton player
  - Emily VanCamp, Canadian actress
- May 13
  - Lena Dunham, American actress and producer
  - Robert Pattinson, English actor and musician
  - Alexander Rybak, Norwegian singer and violinist
  - Nino Schurter, Swiss mountain bike cyclist
- May 14
  - Alyosha, Ukrainian singer
  - Mey Chan, Indonesian singer
  - Marco Motta, Italian footballer
  - Camila Sodi, Mexican actress, singer and model
- May 15 – Matías Fernández, Chilean footballer
- May 16
  - Drew Roy, American actor
  - Megan Fox, American actress and model
  - Shamcey Supsup, Filipina beauty queen, host and pageant director
- May 17
  - Amy Gumenick, Swedish actress
  - Tahj Mowry, American actor and singer
  - Eric Lloyd, American actor, comedian, musician and producer
  - Erin Richards, Welsh actress, director and writer
- May 18
  - Kevin Anderson, South African tennis player
  - Natalia Osipova, Russian ballerina
- May 20
  - Louisa Krause, American actress
  - Kyle Patrick, American musician
- May 21
  - Kevin Kraxner, former Austrian ice hockey player
  - Ricardo Lockette, American football player
  - Mario Mandžukić, Croatian footballer
  - Da'Vine Joy Randolph, American actress
- May 22
  - Thandeka Mdeliswa, South African actress (d. 2020)
  - Julian Edelman, American football player
  - Molly Ephraim, American actress
  - Tatiana Volosozhar, Ukrainian-born Russian figure skater
- May 23
  - Nico Colaluca, American footballer
  - Ryan Coogler, American film director, producer, and screenwriter
  - Valentina Marchei, Italian figure skater
  - Jordan Zimmermann, American baseball player
- May 24
  - Mark Ballas, American dancer, actor, and musician
  - Carolina Rodriguez, Spanish rhythmic gymnast
- May 25
  - Neon Hitch, English singer
  - Geraint Thomas, Welsh racing cyclist
  - Juri Ueno, Japanese actress
- May 26
  - Àstrid Bergès-Frisbey, Spanish actress and model
  - Fern Brady, Scottish comedian
  - Nao Kodaira, Japanese speed skater
- May 27 – Timo Descamps, Belgian actor and singer
- May 28
  - Joseph Cross, American actor
  - Bryant Dunston, American-Armenian basketball player
  - Charles N'Zogbia, French footballer
  - Britt McHenry, American sports reporter
  - Seth Rollins, American professional wrestler
- May 29
  - Hornswoggle, American professional wrestler and actor
  - Eleazar Gómez, Mexican actor
  - Jaslene Gonzalez, Puerto Rican fashion model
- May 30
  - Will Peltz, American actor
  - Pasha Parfeni, Moldovan singer
- May 31
  - Brooke Castile, American figure skater
  - Robert Gesink, Dutch cyclist
  - Sopho Khalvashi, Georgian musician
  - Melissa McIntyre, Canadian actress

=== June ===
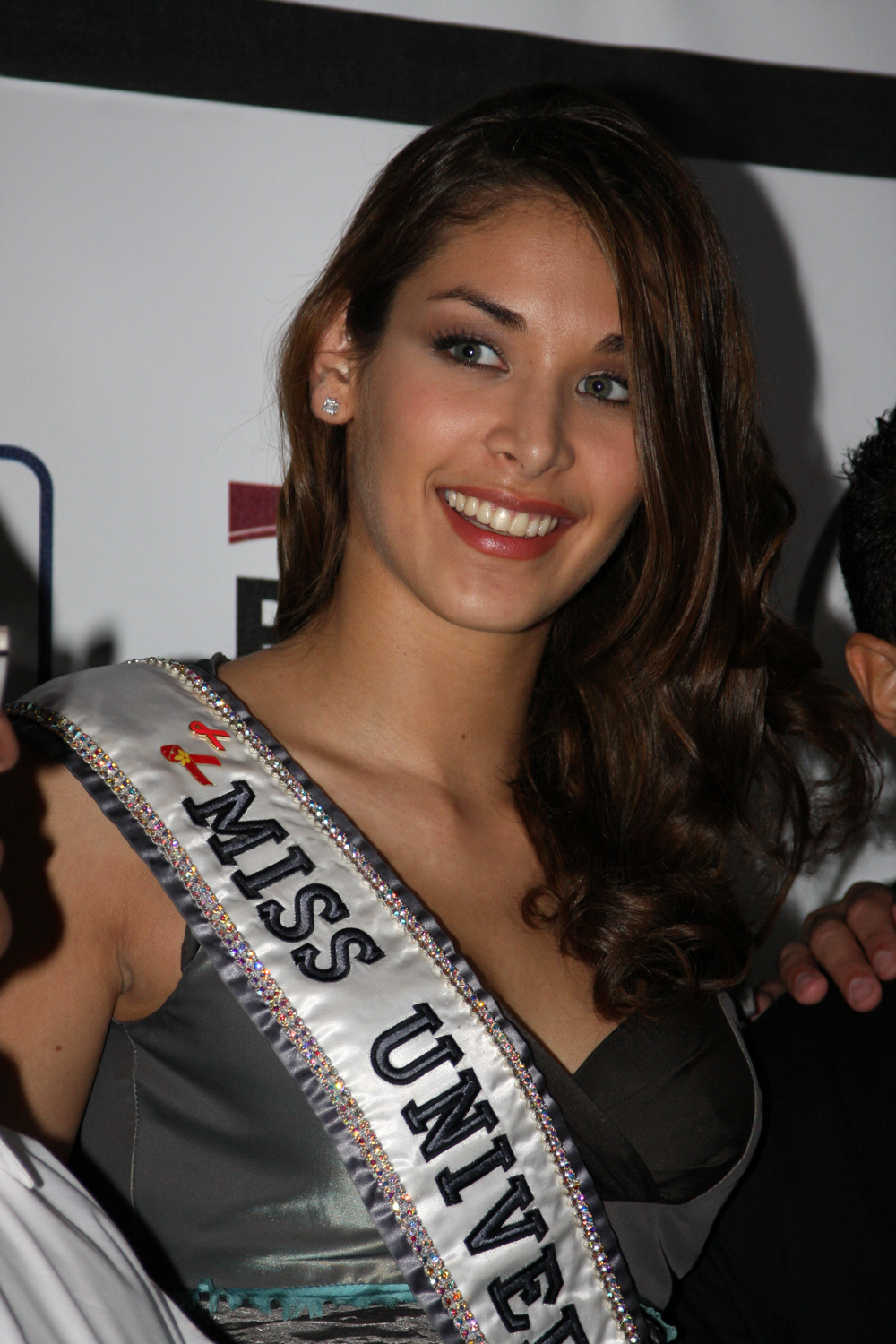
Dayana Mendoza

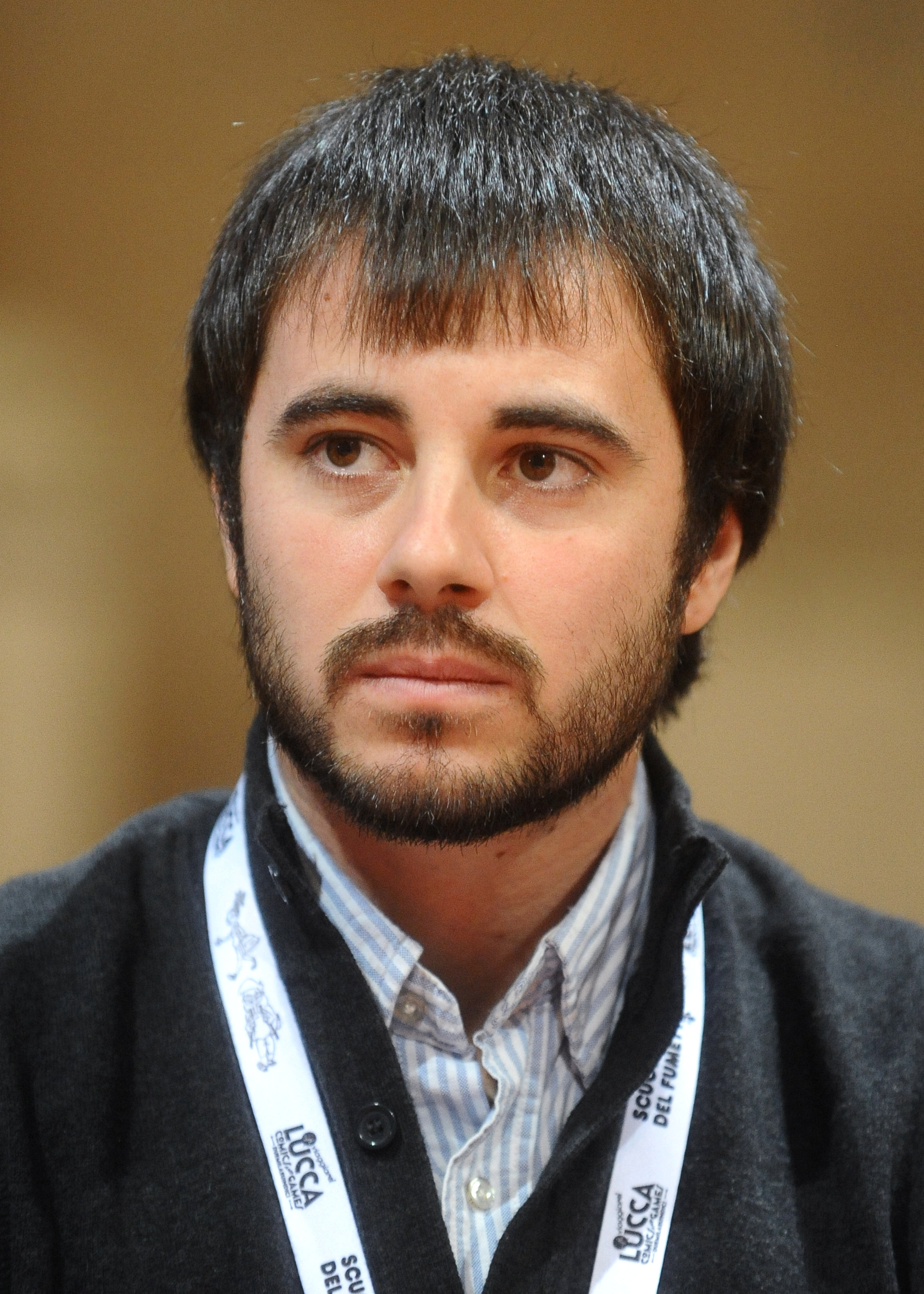
Alessio Puccio

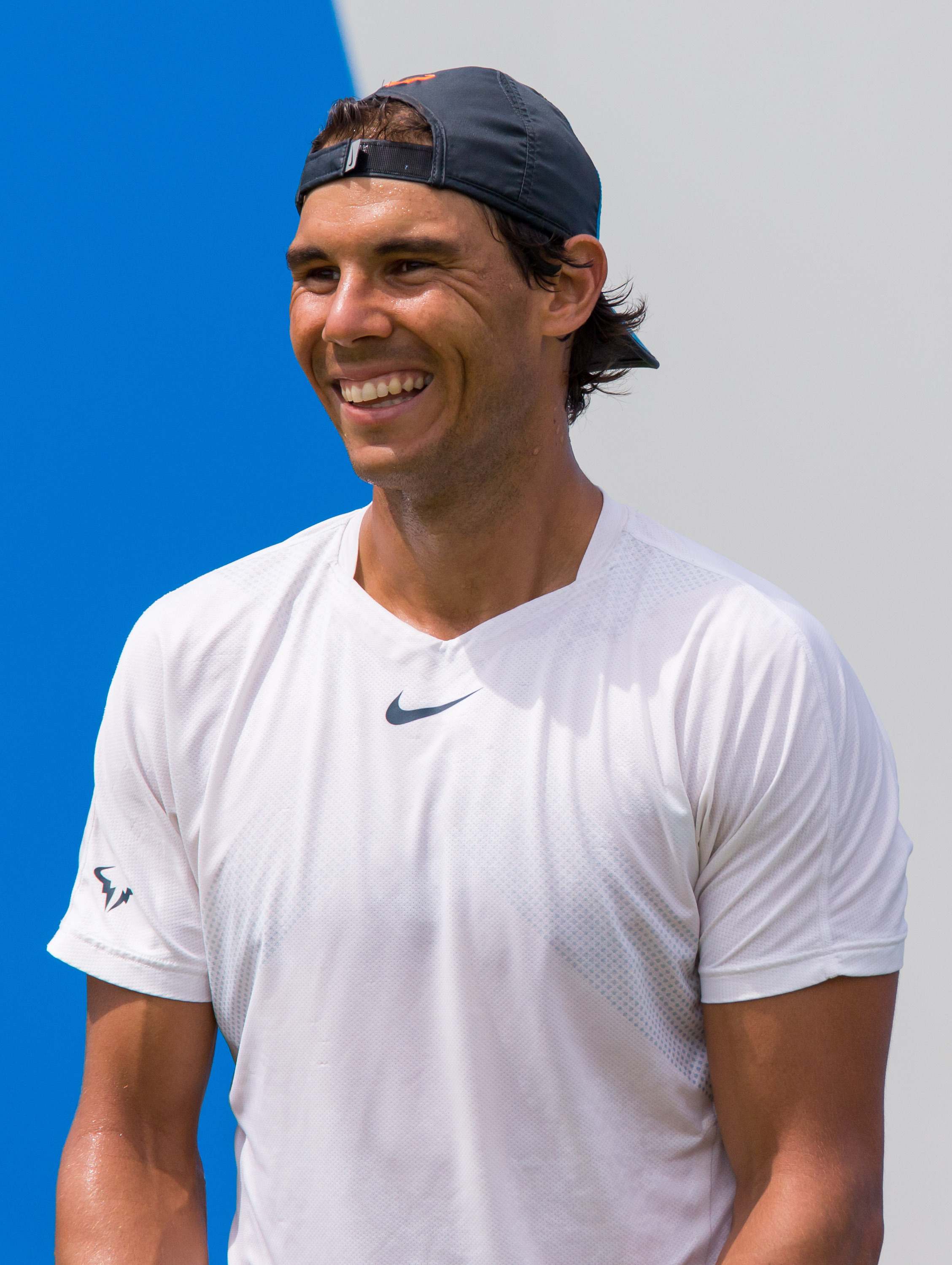
Rafael Nadal

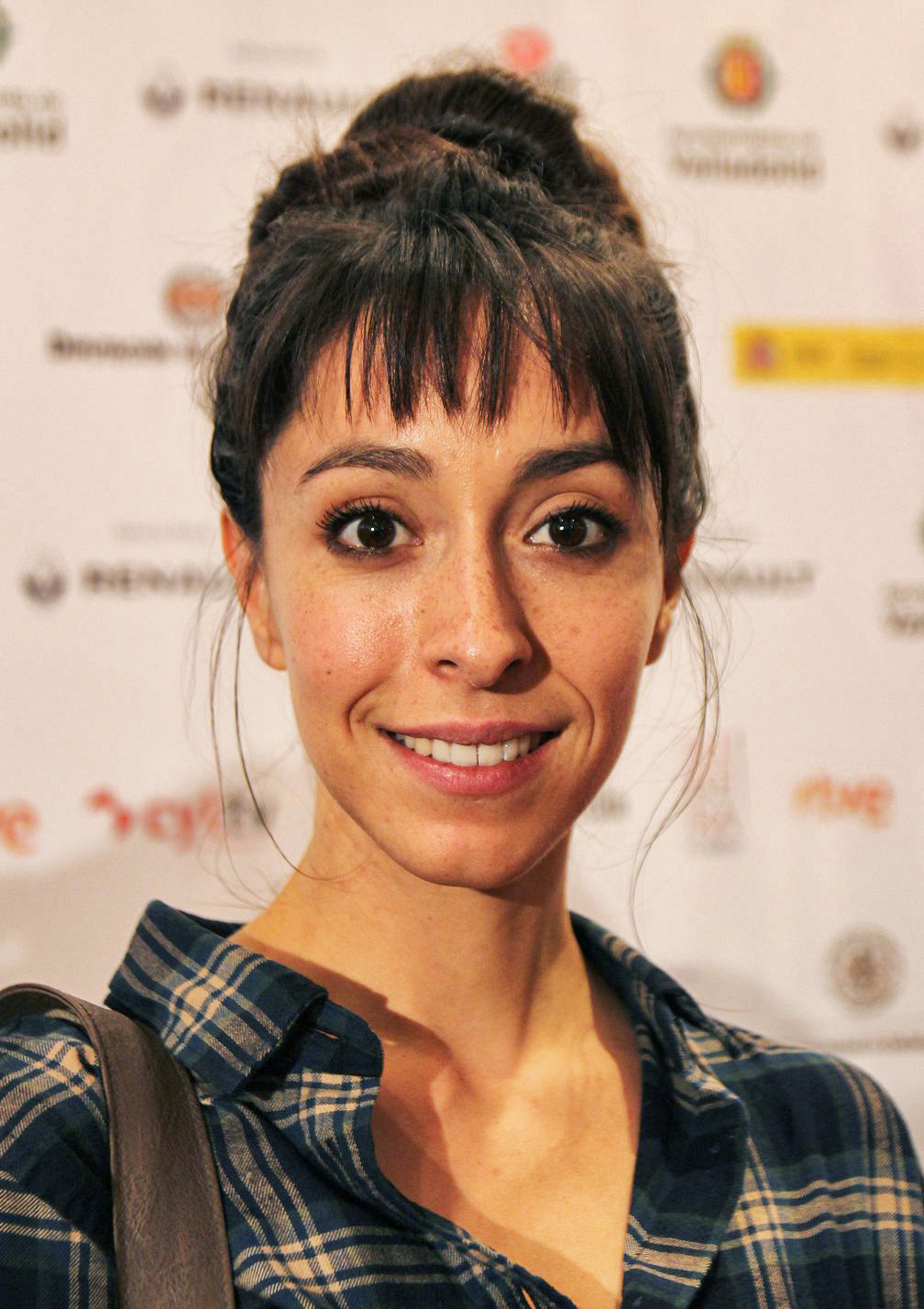
Oona Chaplin

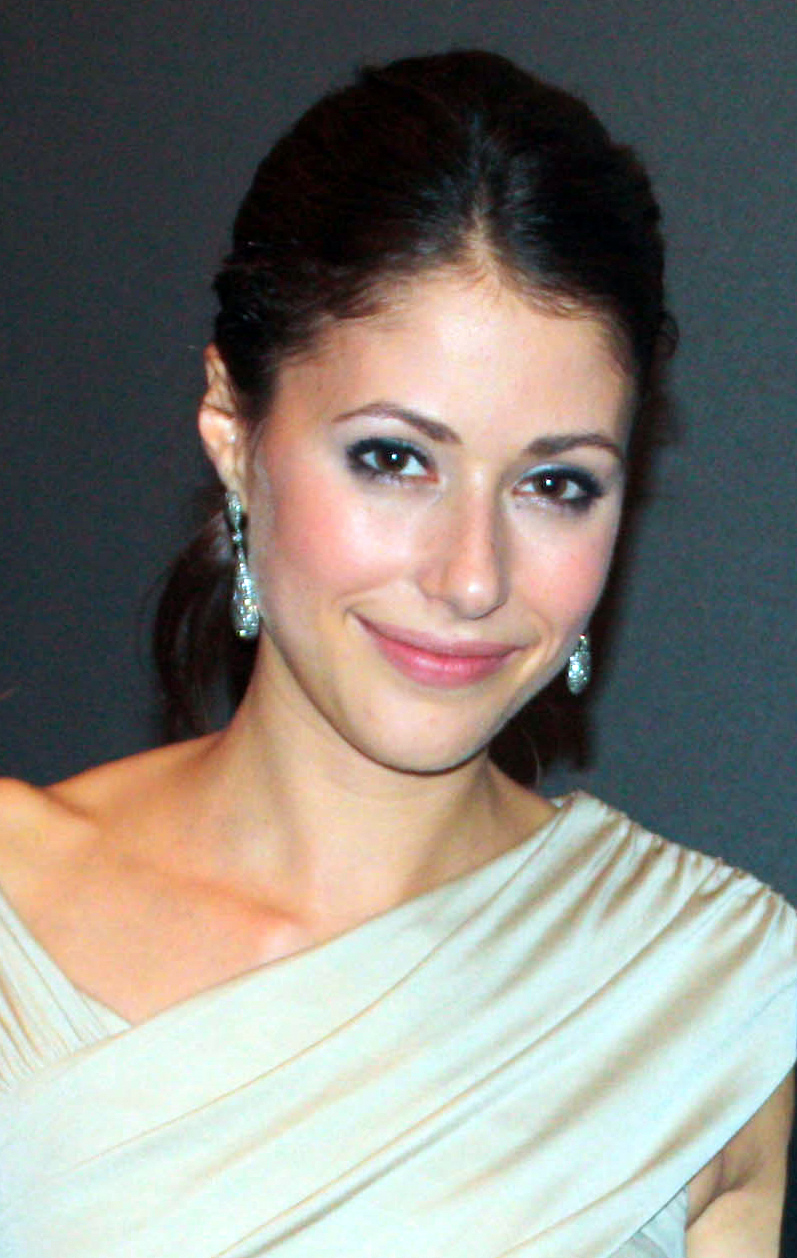
Amanda Crew

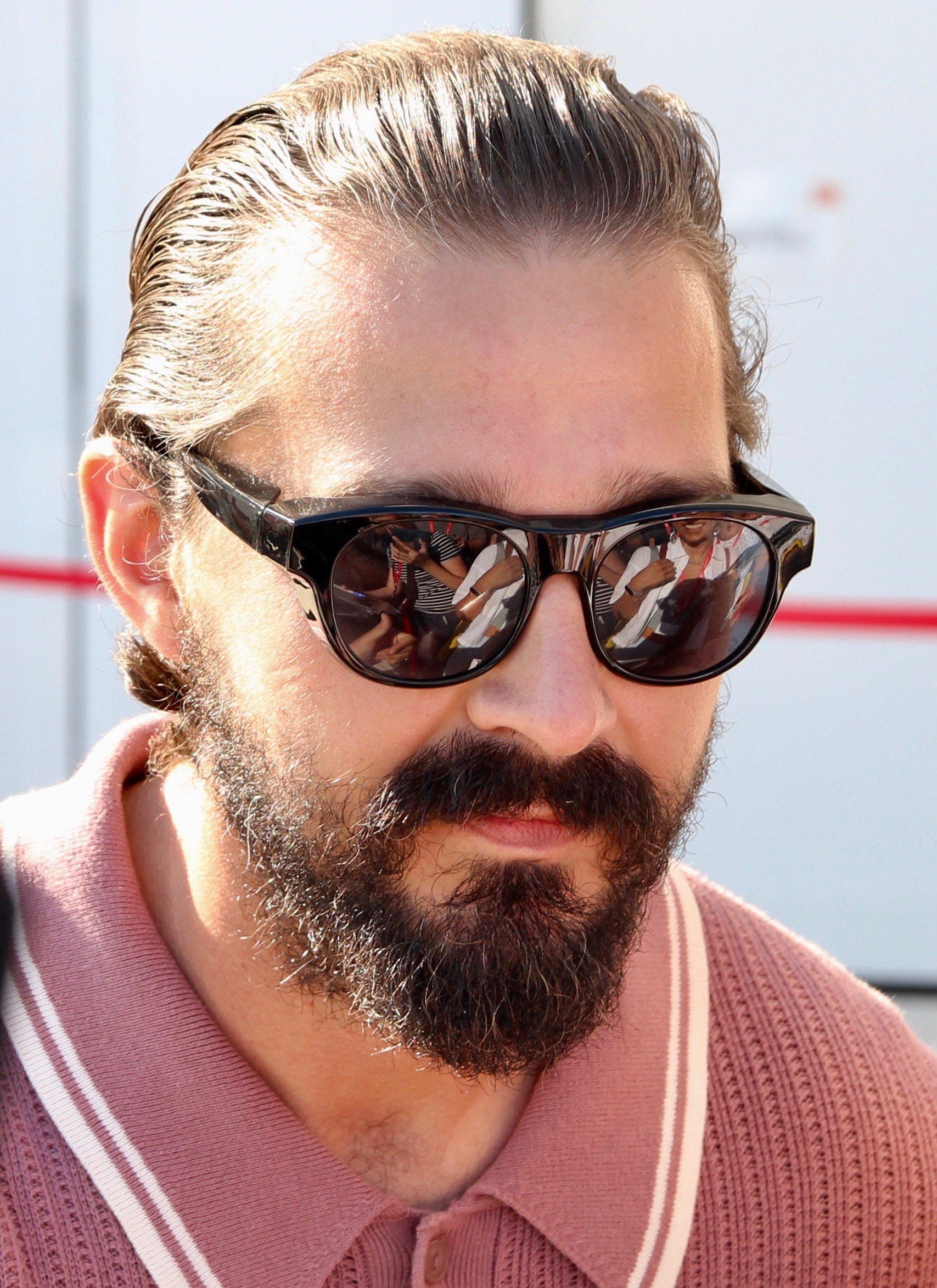
Shia LaBeouf

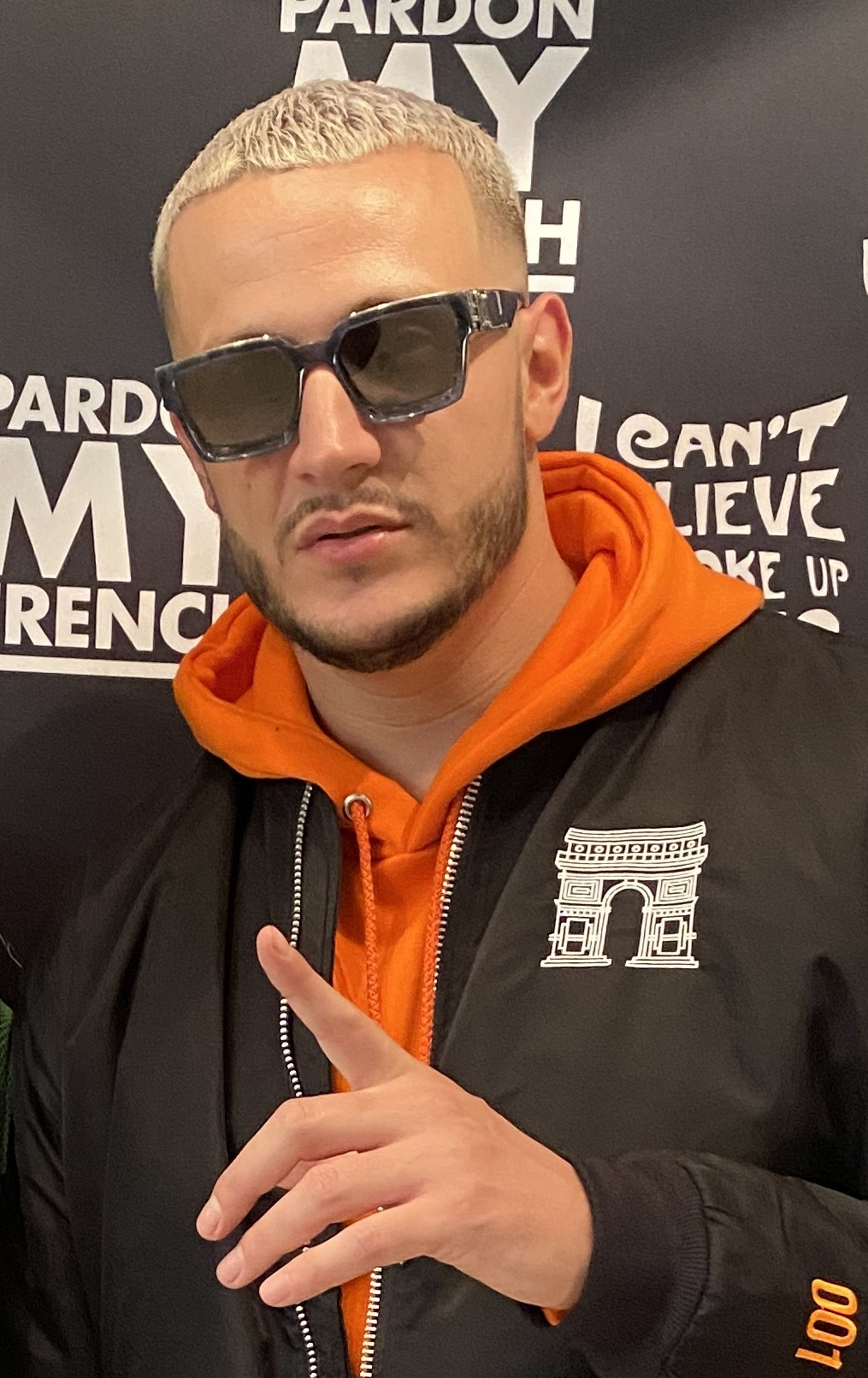
DJ Snake

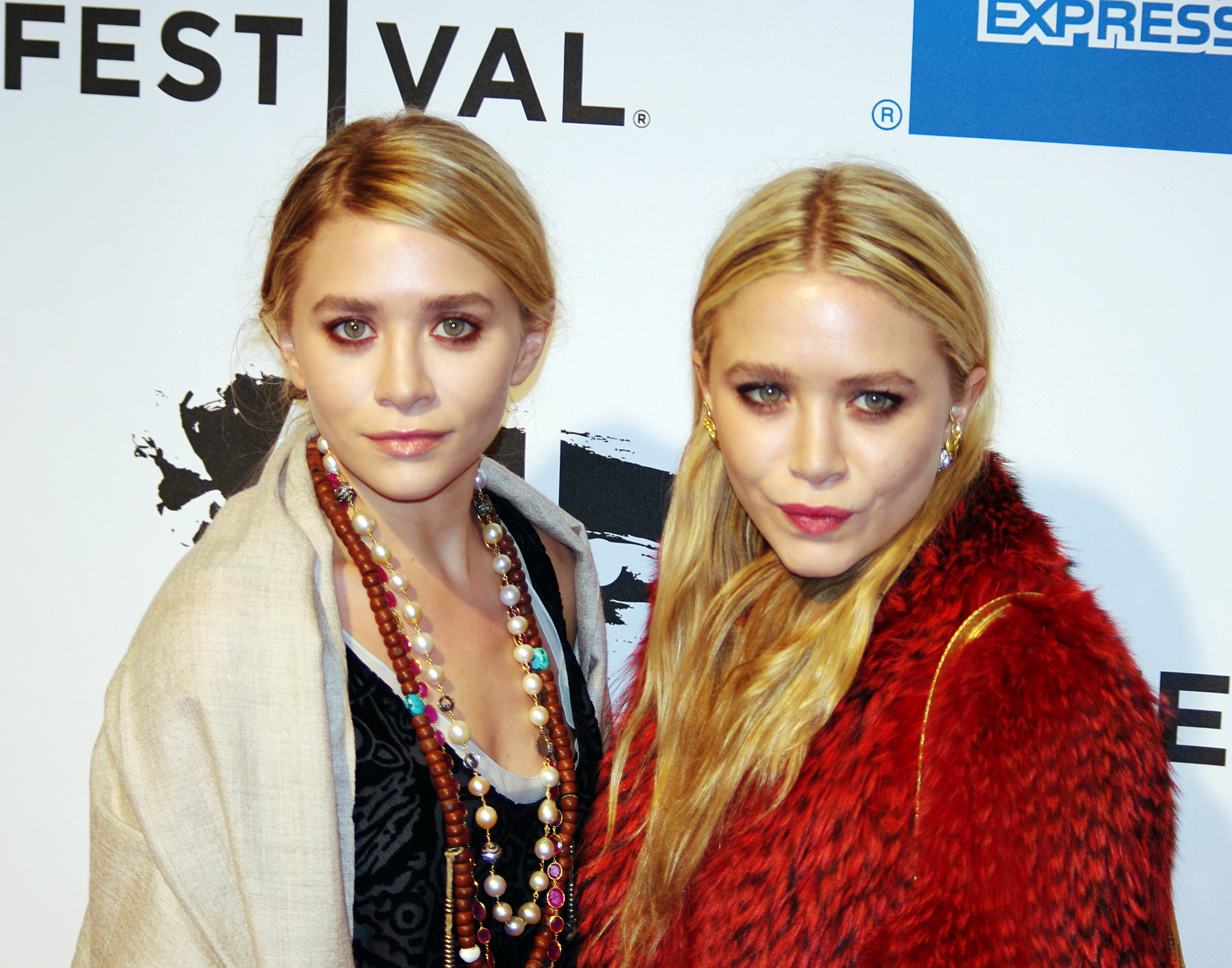
Ashley and Mary-Kate Olsen

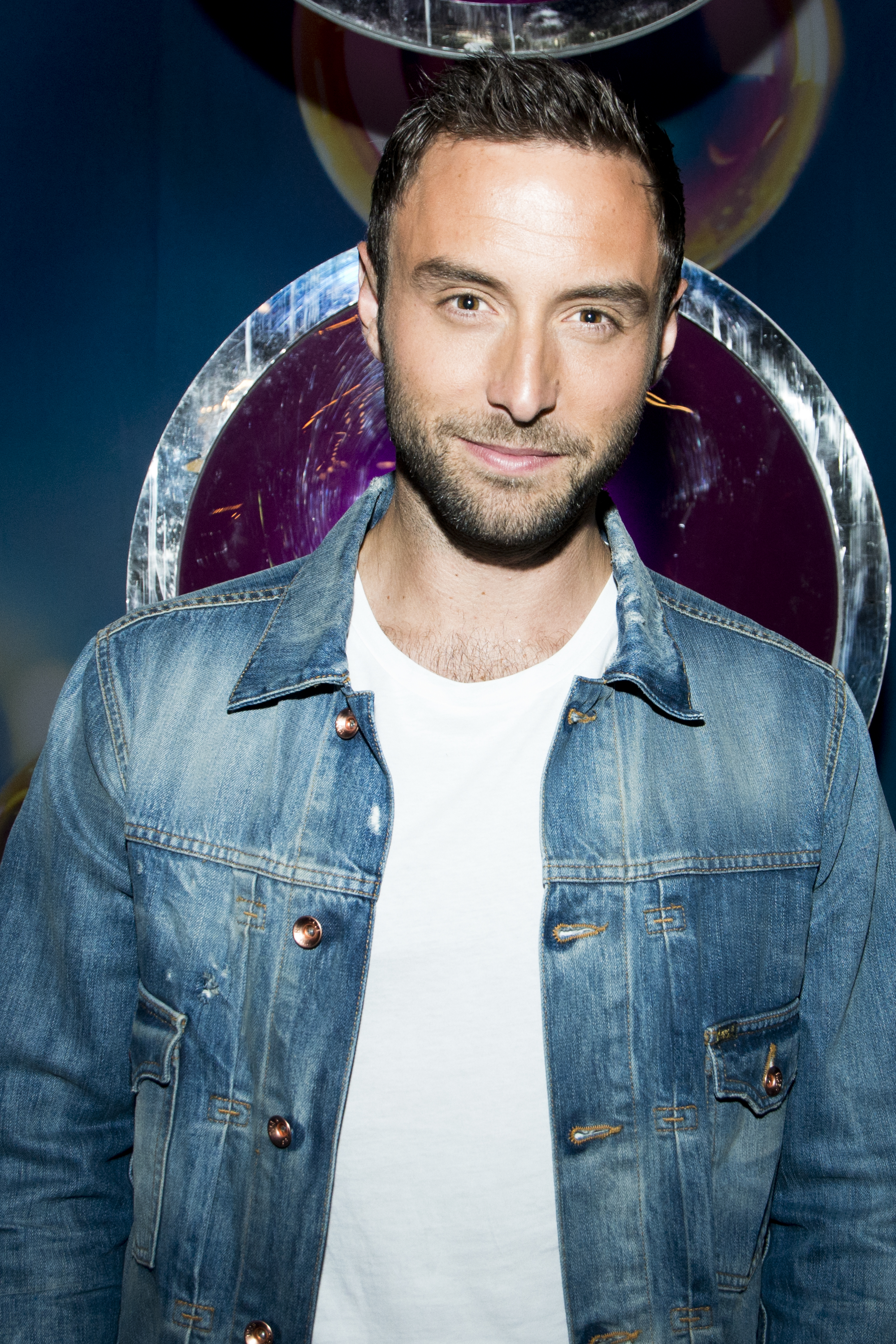
Måns Zelmerlöw

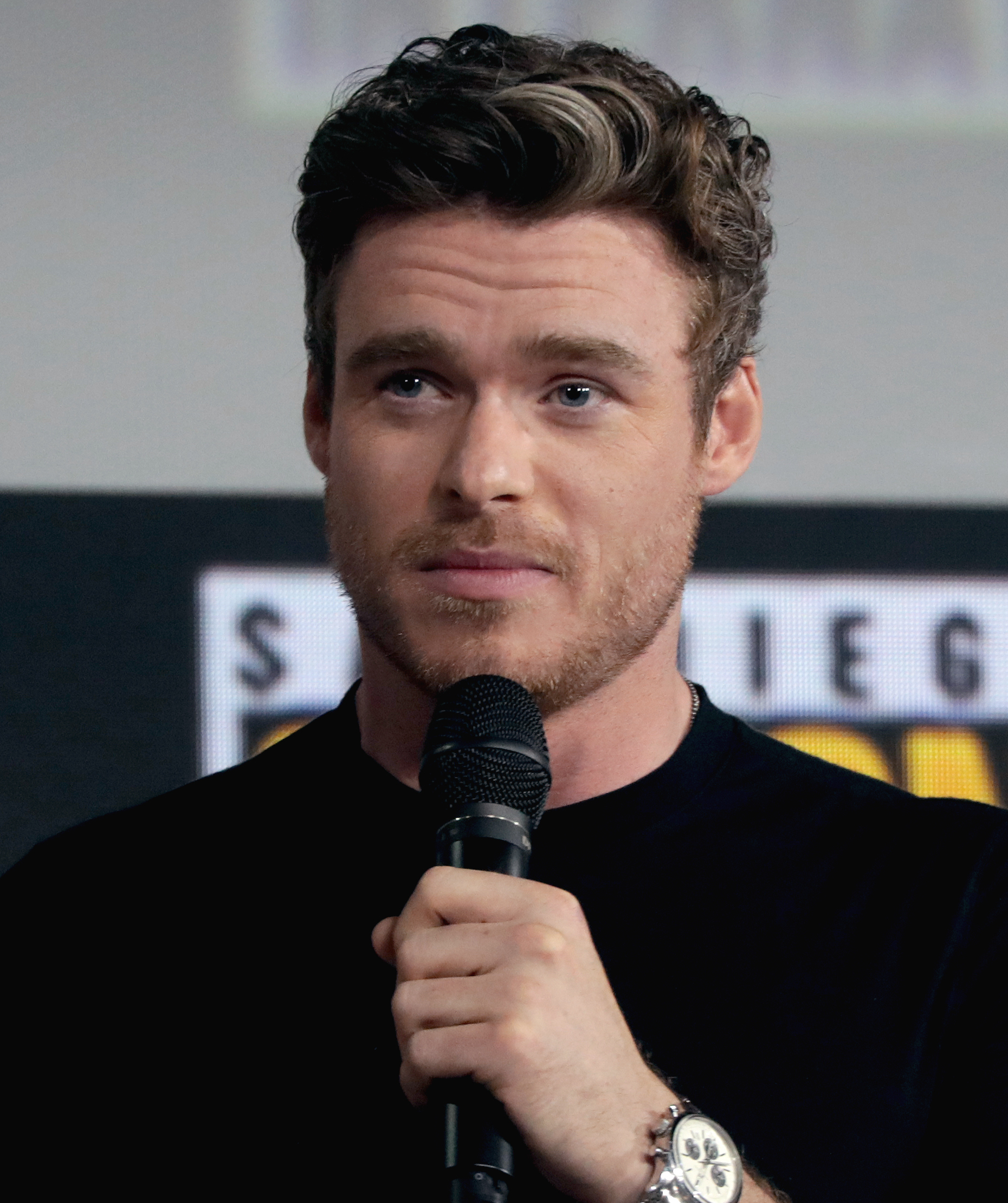
Richard Madden

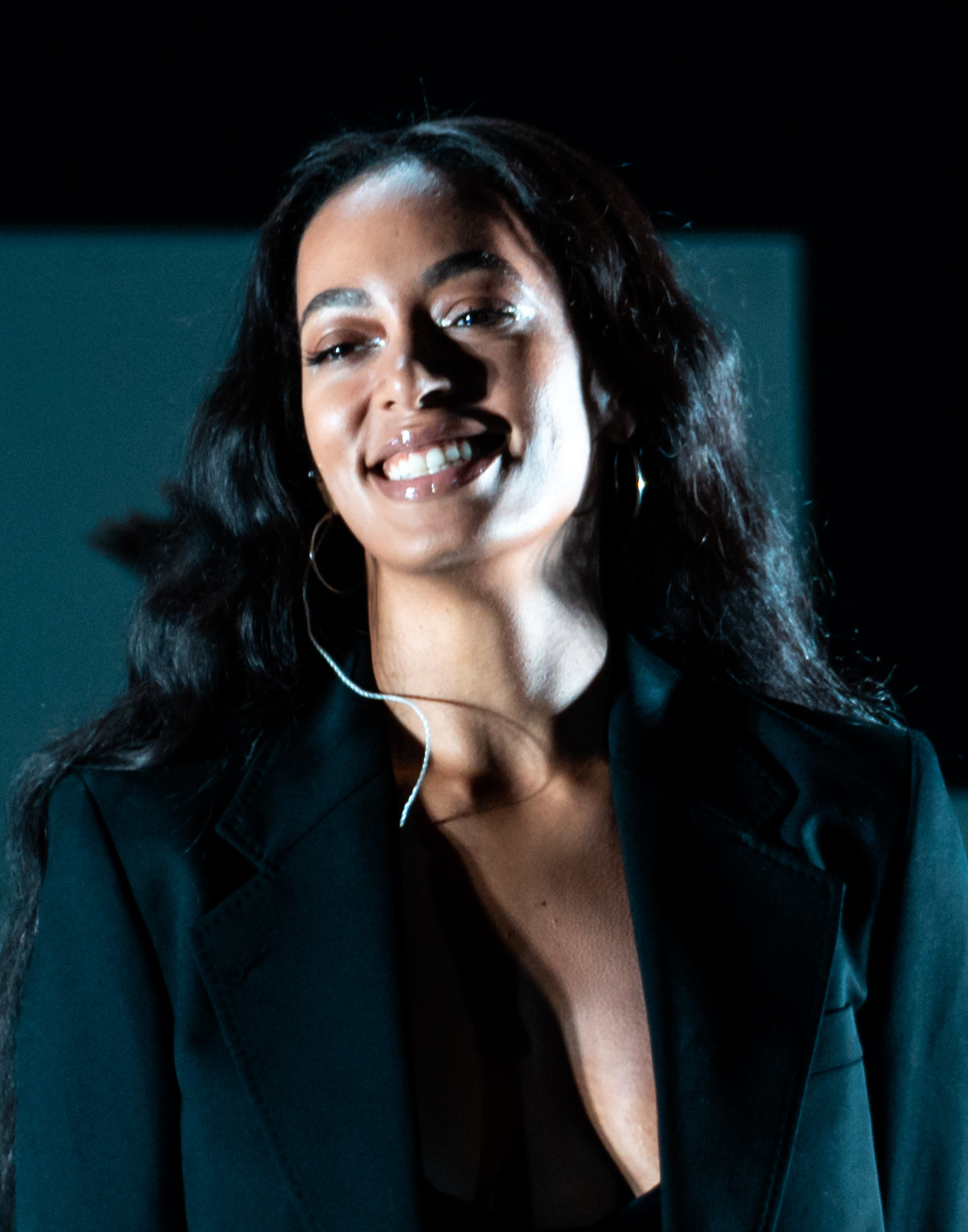
Solange Knowles

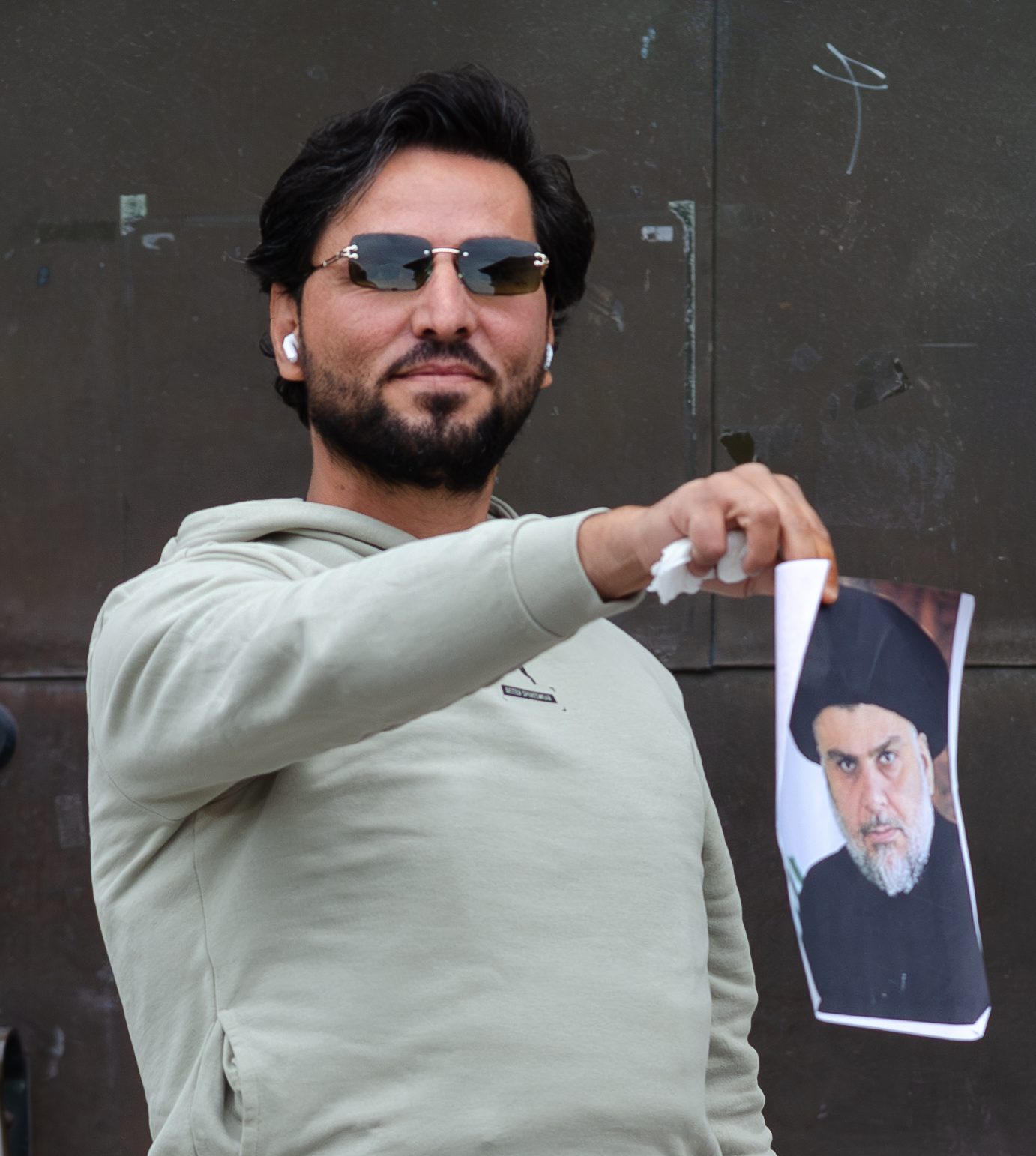
Salwan Momika

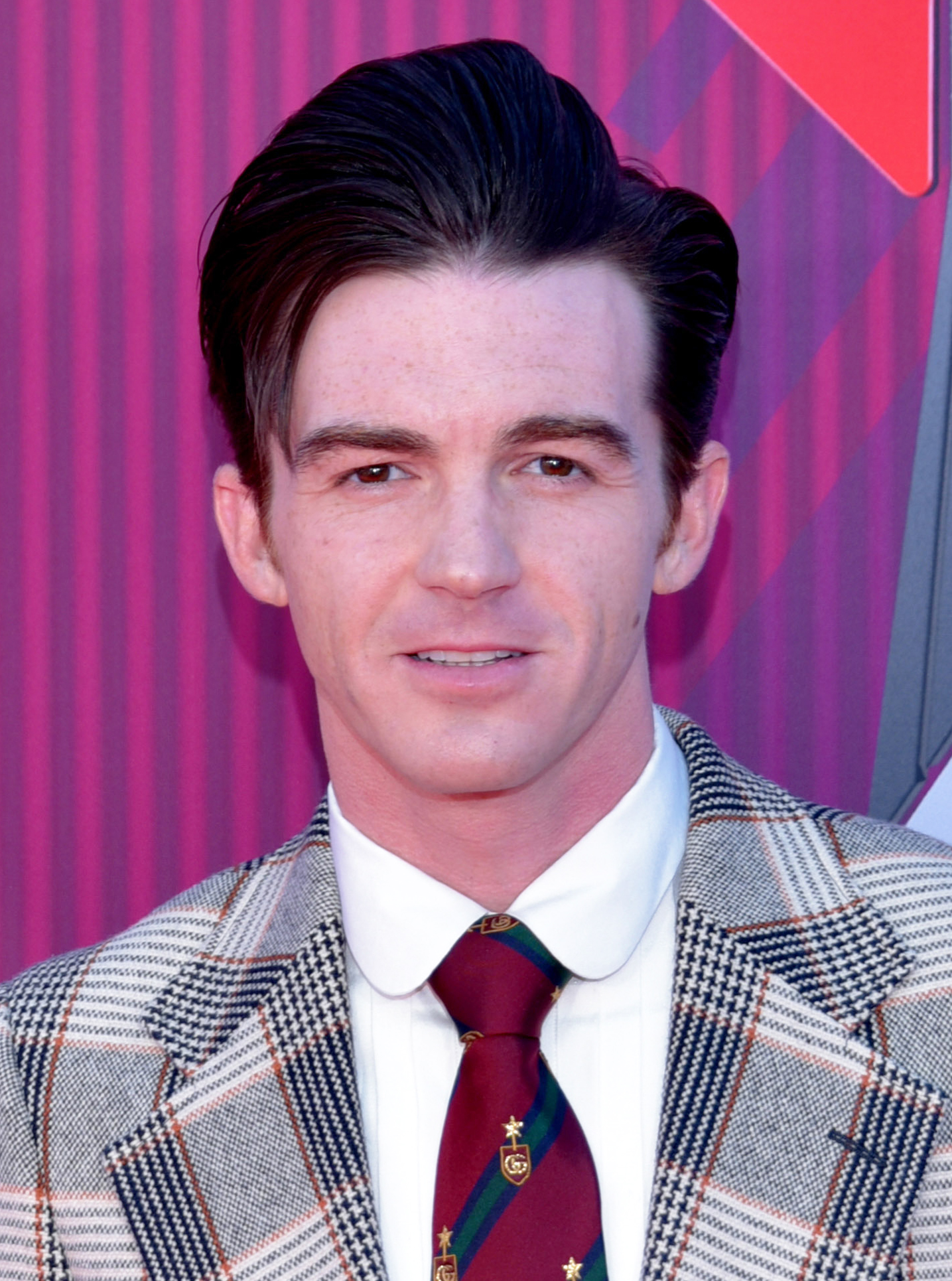
Drake Bell

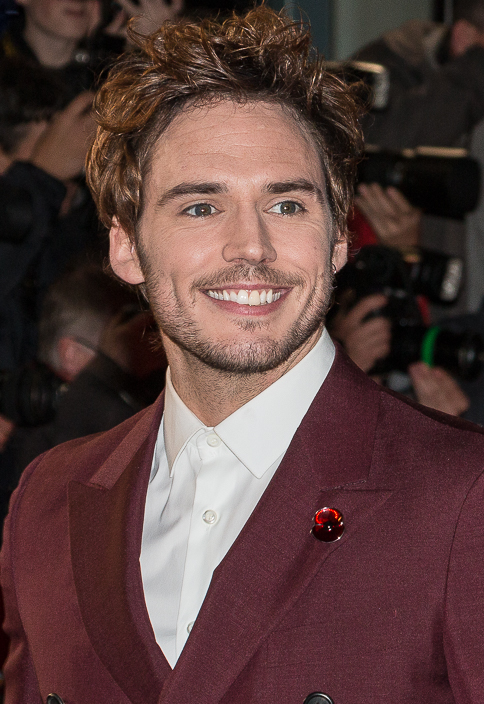
Sam Claflin

- June 1
  - Ricardo Abarca, Mexican actor and singer
  - Moses Ndiema Masai, Kenyan runner
  - Dayana Mendoza, Venezuelan model and beauty queen
  - Chinedu Obasi, Nigerian footballer
  - Skream, British DJ and producer
  - Ben Smith, New Zealand rugby player
- June 2
  - Todd Carney, Australian rugby player
  - Matt Kean, English bassist
  - Curtis Lofton, American football player
- June 3
  - Al Horford, Dominican basketball player
  - Micah Kogo, Kenyan runner
  - Rafael Nadal, Spanish tennis player
  - Josh Segarra, American actor
  - Adrián Vallés, Spanish race car driver
  - Tomáš Verner, Czech Republic ice skater
- June 4
  - Oona Chaplin, Spanish-English actress and dancer
  - Fahriye Evcen, German-Turkish actress
  - Shane Kippel, Canadian actor
  - Shelly Woods, British wheelchair racer
  - Yoochun, South Korean musician and actor
- June 5
  - Christian Baracat, German rugby player
  - Dave Bolland, Canadian ice hockey player
  - Amanda Crew, Canadian actress
  - Vernon Gholston, American football player
- June 6
  - Justin Allgaier, American race car driver
  - Kim Hyun-joong, South Korean actor, model and singer
  - Junichi Tazawa, Japanese-American baseball player
  - Leslie Carter, American pop singer (d. 2012)
- June 9 – Adamo Ruggiero, Canadian actor
- June 10
  - Hajime Hosogai, Japanese footballer
  - Joey Zimmerman, American actor and musician
- June 11 – Shia LaBeouf, American actor, performance artist, and filmmaker
- June 12
  - Benjamin Schmideg, Australian actor
  - Cintia Dicker, Brazilian model
  - Jessica Keenan Wynn, American actress
  - Luke Youngblood, British actor
  - Mario Casas, Spanish actor
  - Gary Buckland, Welsh former professional boxer of Romani descent
- June 13
  - Kat Dennings, American actress
  - DJ Snake, French DJ and producer
  - Keisuke Honda, Japanese football player
  - Ashley Olsen, American actress
  - Mary-Kate Olsen, American actress
  - Onuma Sittirak, Thai volleyball player
  - Måns Zelmerlöw, Swedish pop singer and television presenter
- June 14 – Haley Hudson, American actress
- June 15 – Momoko Ueda, Japanese golfer
- June 16 – Fernando Muslera, Uruguayan footballer
- June 17
  - Marie Avgeropoulos, Canadian actress and model
  - Lisa Haydon, Indian actress
- June 18
  - Richard Gasquet, French tennis player
  - Richard Madden, Scottish actor
  - Shusaku Nishikawa, Japanese footballer
  - Meaghan Rath, Canadian film and television actress
  - Crystal Renn, American model and author
- June 19 – Marvin Williams, American basketball player
- June 20 – Dreama Walker, American actress
- June 21 – Cheick Tioté, Ivorian footballer (d. 2017)
- June 23
  - Michael Annett, American racing driver (d. 2025)
  - Marti Malloy, American judoka
  - Colin Ryan, English actor
  - Simon Špilak, Slovenian road bicycle racer
  - Salwan Momika, Iraqı activist (d. 2025)
- June 24
  - Stuart Broad, English cricketer
  - Solange Knowles, American actress and singer
  - Bojana Stamenov, Serbian singer
- June 25
  - Lee Ho-suk, South Korean short-track skater
  - Ace Mahbaz, Iranian actor and writer
- June 26
  - Jordan Fish, British keyboardist, singer-songwriter and producer
  - Mohd Farizal Marlias, Malaysian footballer
- June 27
  - Drake Bell, American actor, voice actor, singer, songwriter, and musician
  - Sam Claflin, British actor
  - LaShawn Merritt, American sprinter
- June 28
  - Suzuko Mimori, Japanese voice actress and singer
  - Kellie Pickler, American singer
  - Shadia Simmons, Canadian actress
  - Maya Stojan, Swiss actress
- June 29
  - Christopher Egan, Australian actor
  - Edward Maya, Romanian musician
  - Iya Villania, Filipina TV personality
- June 30 – Alicia Fox, American professional wrestler and model

=== July ===
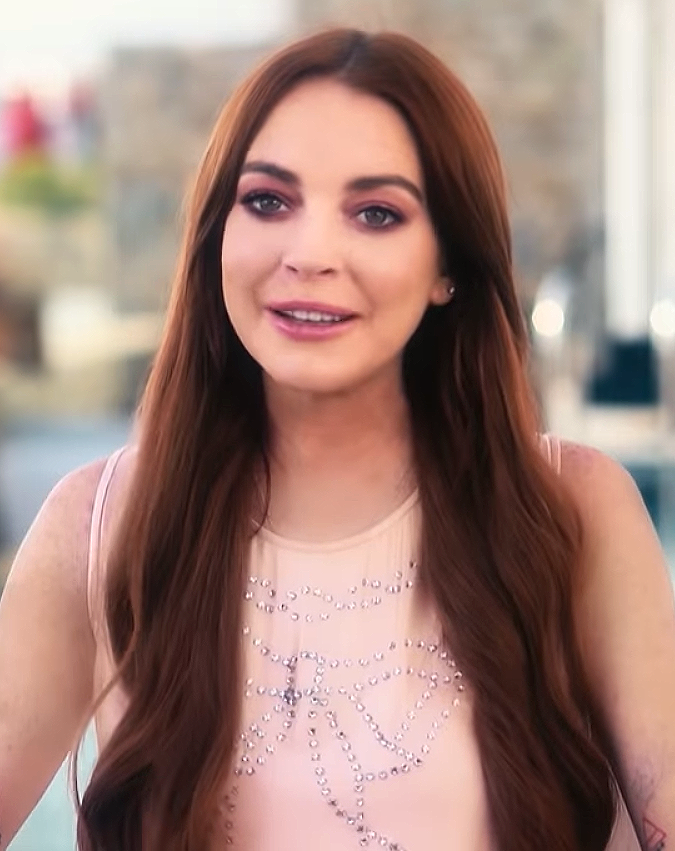
Lindsay Lohan

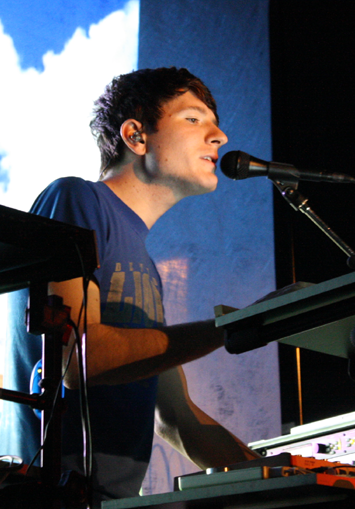
Adam Young

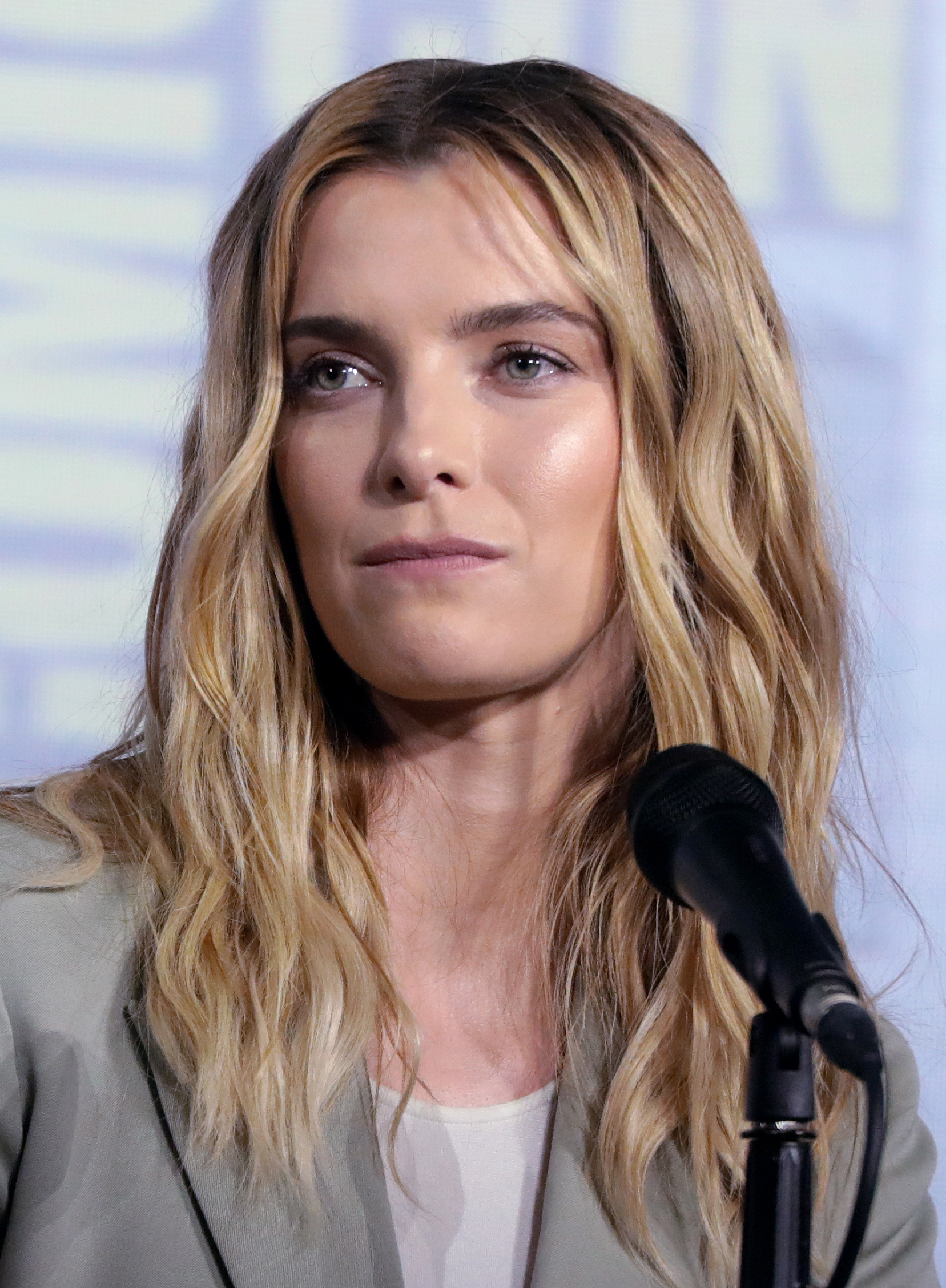
Betty Gilpin

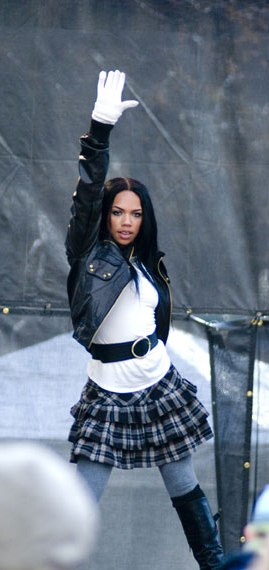
Kiely Williams

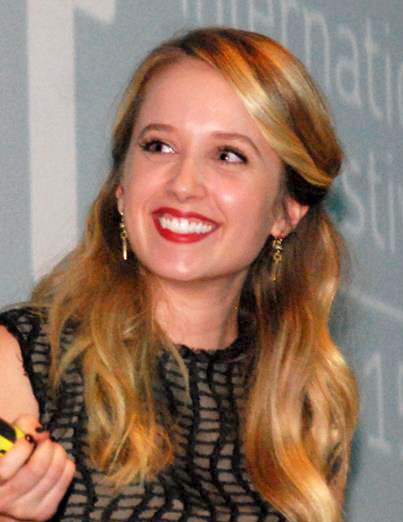
Megan Park

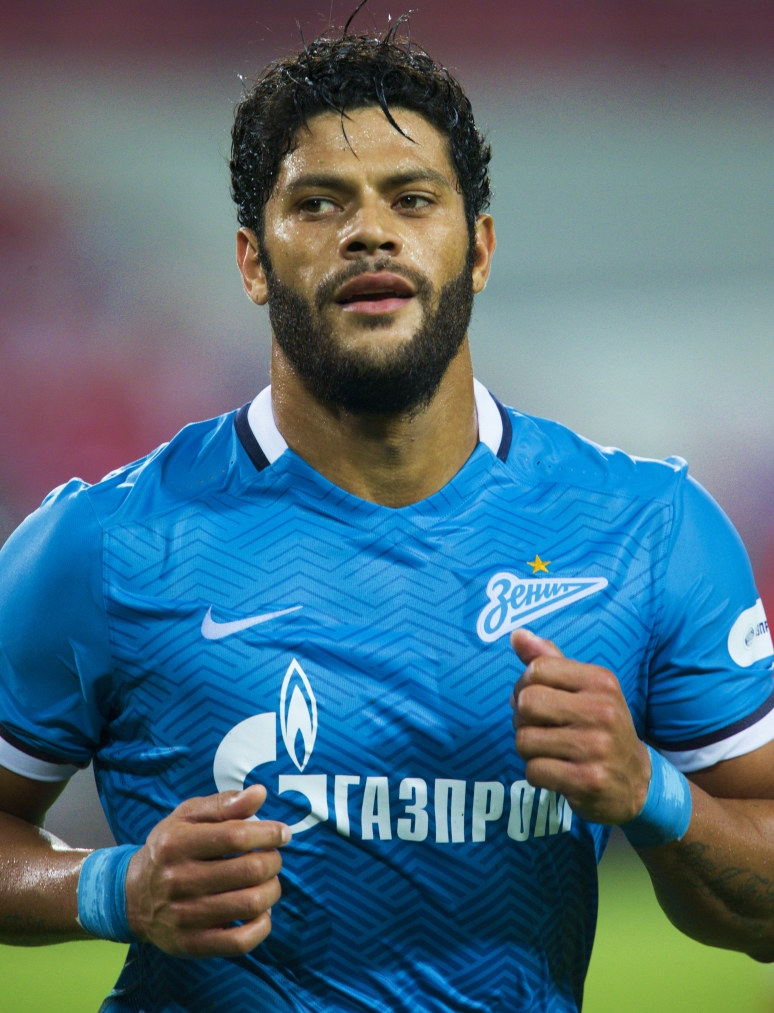
Hulk

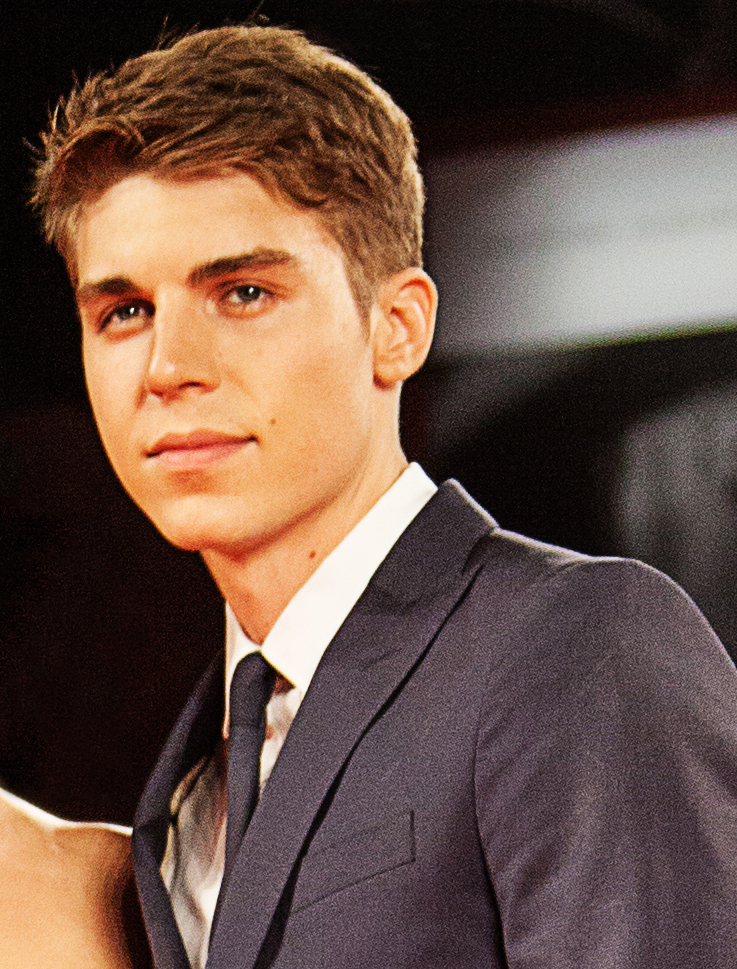
Nolan Gerard Funk

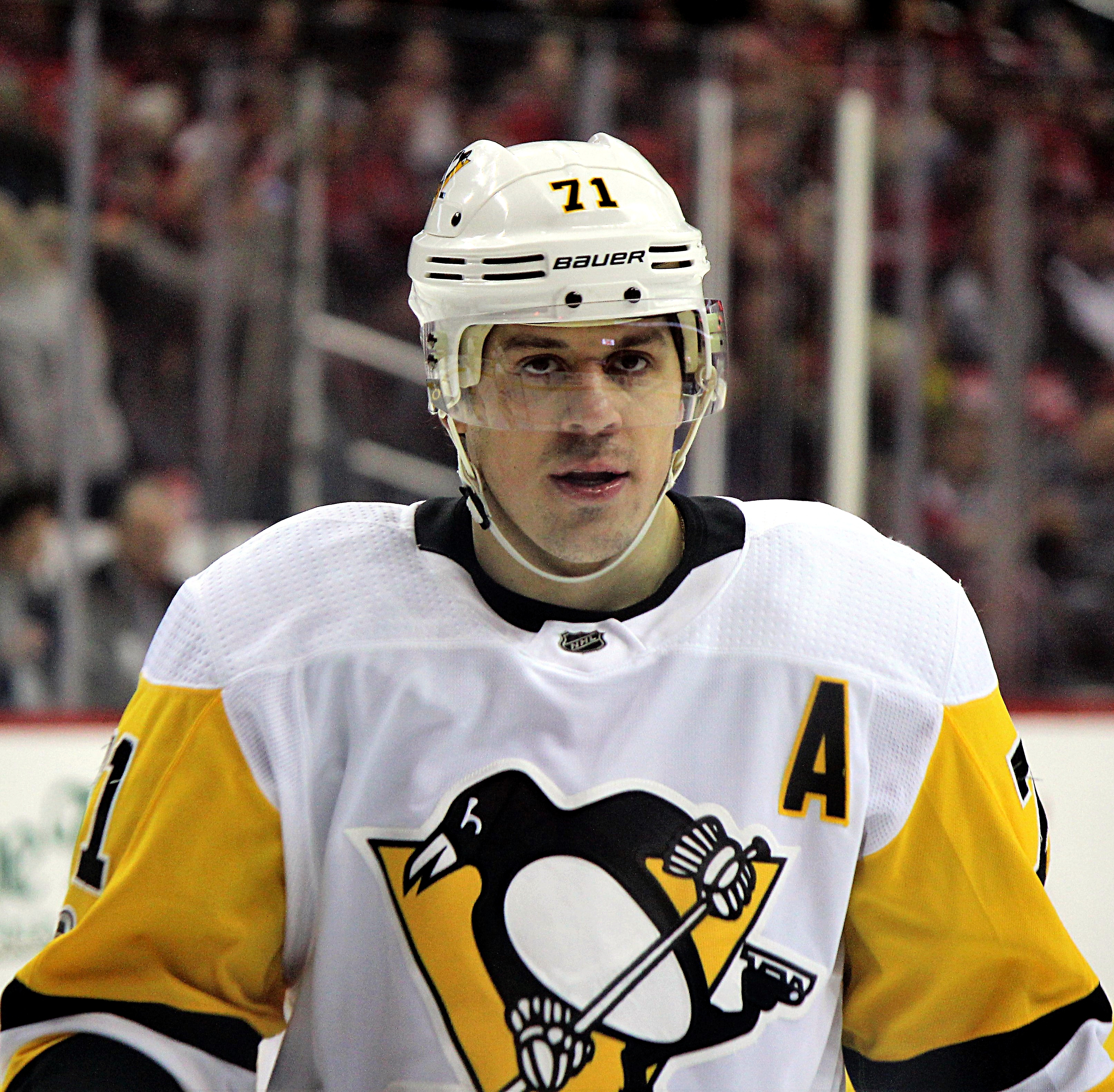
Evgeni Malkin

- July 1 – Charlie Blackmon, American baseball player
- July 2
  - Lindsay Lohan, American actress and singer
  - Bruno Rezende, Brazilian volleyball player
  - Kseniya Sydorenko, Ukrainian synchronized swimmer
  - Katie Taylor, Irish boxer
- July 3
  - Oscar Ustari, Argentine footballer
  - Felixia Yeap, Malaysian model
- July 4 – Takahisa Masuda, Japanese actor and singer
- July 5
  - Iurii Cheban, Ukrainian canoe sprinter
  - Ashkan Dejagah, Iranian footballer
  - Adam Young, American musician
- July 7
  - Ana Kasparian, American progressive political commentator, media host, and journalist
  - Sevyn Streeter, American singer
- July 8
  - Kaiane Aldorino, Gibraltarian politician, beauty queen who won Miss World 2009
  - Renata Costa, Brazilian footballer
  - Jake McDorman, American film and television actor
- July 9 – Kiely Williams, American actress and singer
- July 10
  - Shintaro Yamada, Japanese fashion model, actor and singer
  - Wyatt Russell, American actor
  - Tom Richards, English squash player
- July 11 – Raúl García, Spanish footballer
- July 12 – JP Pietersen, South African rugby player
- July 13 – Stanley Weber, French actor and theatre director
- July 14
  - Sanam Baloch, Pakistani VJ, actress and anchor
  - Peta Murgatroyd, New Zealand-born Australian dancer
  - Dan Smith, British singer
  - Ambruse Vanzekin, Nigerian footballer
- July 15
  - Yahya Abdul-Mateen II, American actor
  - Mishael Morgan, Canadian actress
- July 17
  - Dana, Korean singer, dancer and actress
  - Mojo Rawley, American professional wrestler and former American professional football player
  - Brando Eaton, American film and television actor
- July 18
  - James Sorensen, Australian model and actor
  - Travis Milne, Canadian actor
- July 19 – Jinder Mahal, Canadian professional wrestler
- July 20 – Osric Chau, Canadian actor and martial artist
- July 21
  - Livia Brito, Cuban-Mexican actress and model
  - Betty Gilpin, American actress
  - Diane Guerrero, American actress
- July 22
  - Lauri Miranda Silva, Brazilian professor
- July 23
  - Aya Uchida, Japanese voice actress
  - Ayaka Komatsu, Japanese actress, model and gravure idol
- July 24
  - Vugar Gashimov, Azerbaijani chess grandmaster (d. 2014)
  - Megan Park, Canadian actress and singer
  - Natalie Tran, Australian comedian
  - Remy Hii, Malaysian-Australian actor
- July 25 – Hulk, Brazilian footballer
- July 26 – Monica Raymund, American actress
- July 28
  - Alexandra Chando, American actress
  - Nolan Gerard Funk, Canadian actor and singer
- July 31
  - Sean Eldridge, Canadian-born American political and gay activist
  - Paola Espinosa, Mexican diver
  - Evgeni Malkin, Russian hockey player

=== August ===
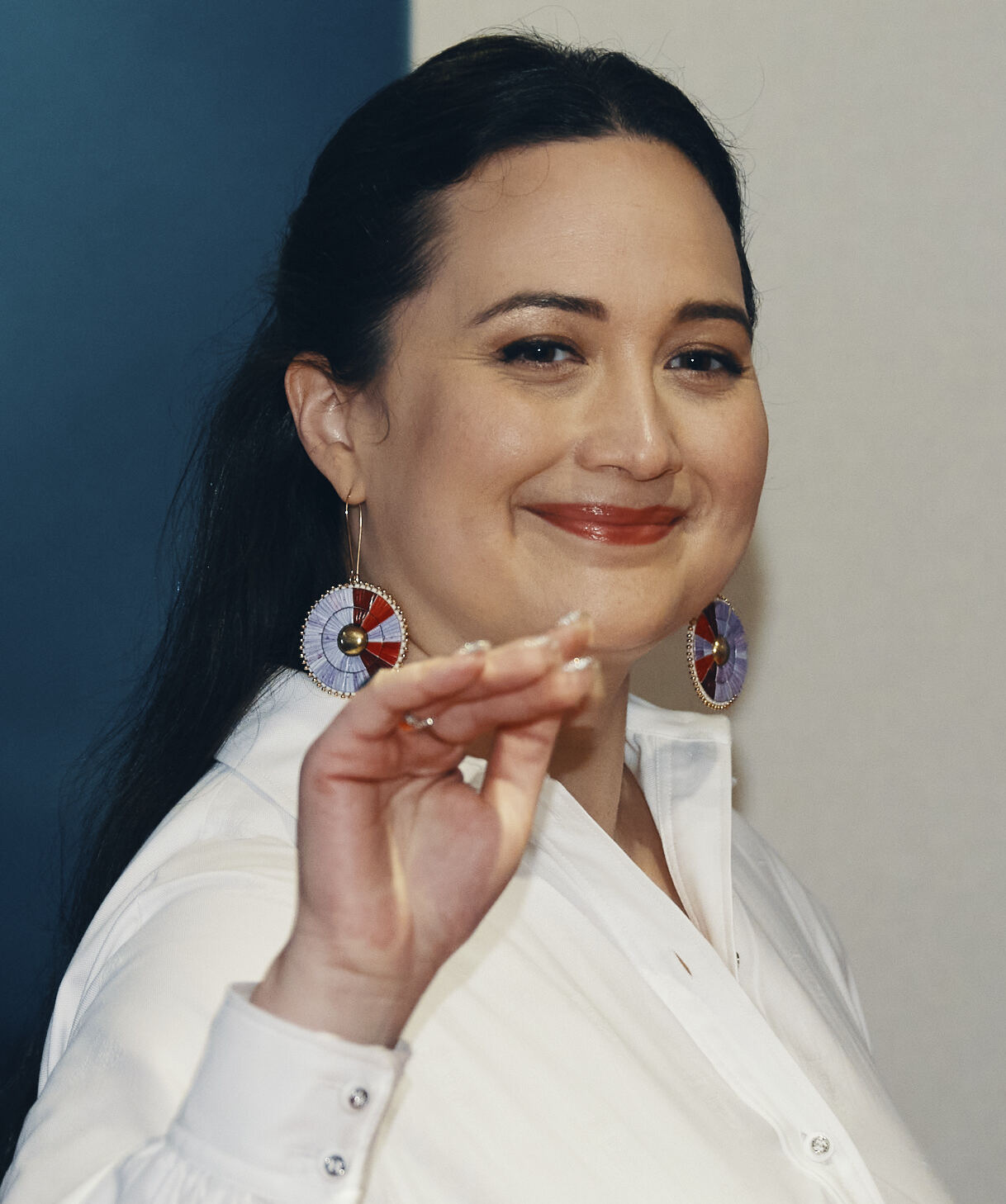
Lily Gladstone

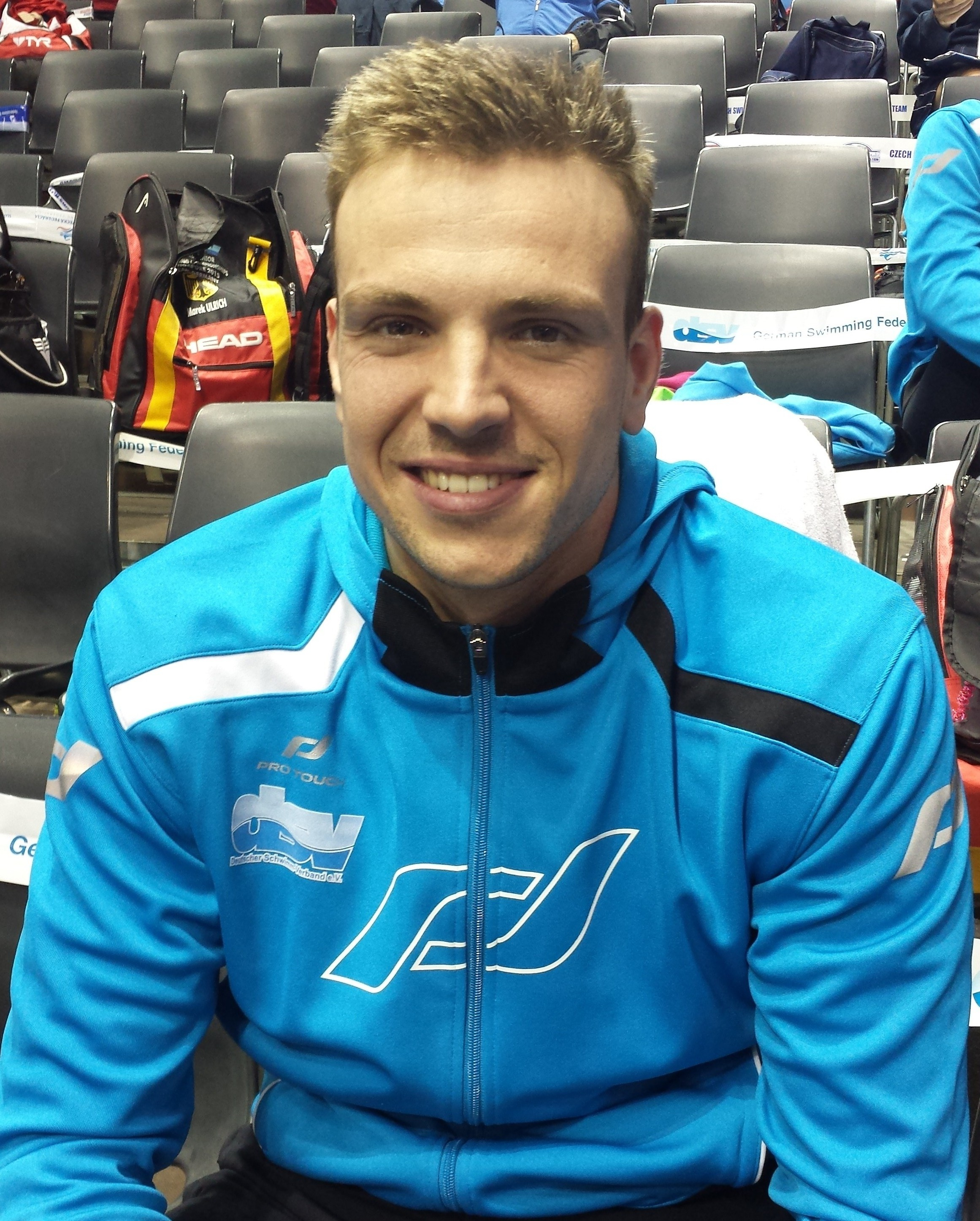
Paul Biedermann

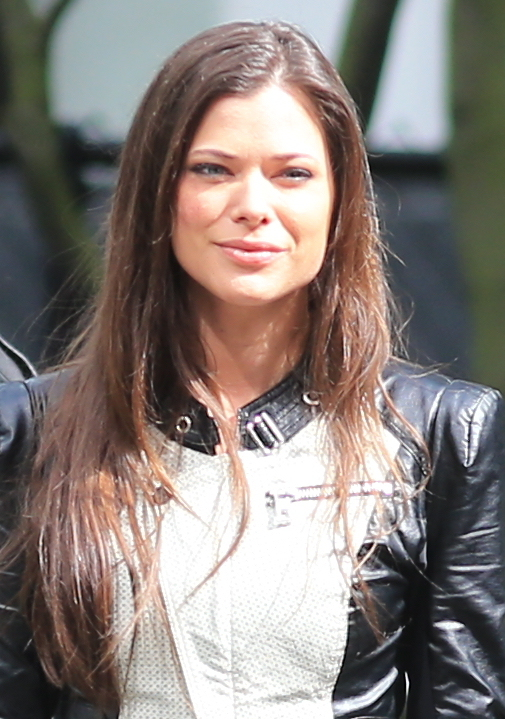
Peyton List

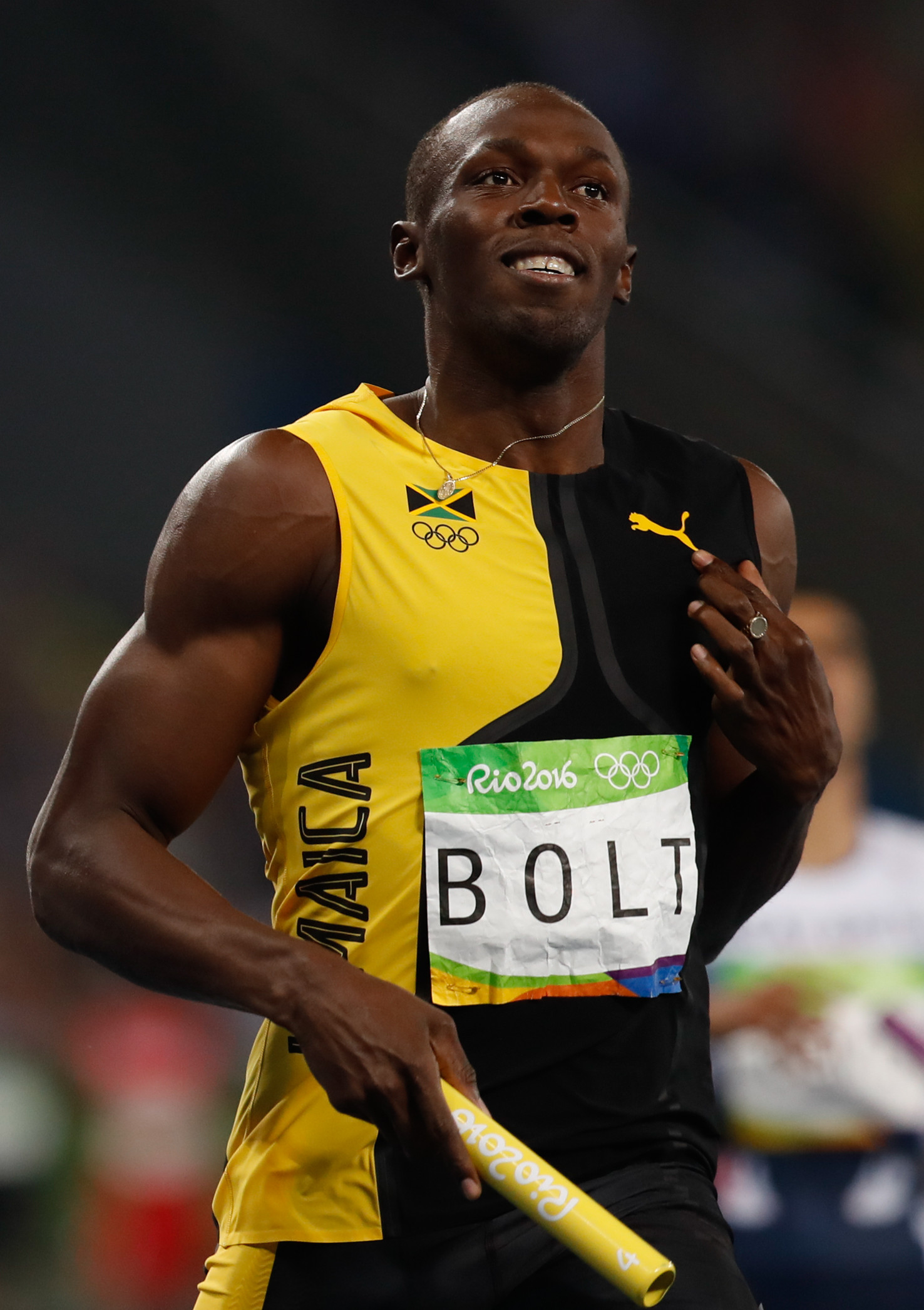
Usain Bolt

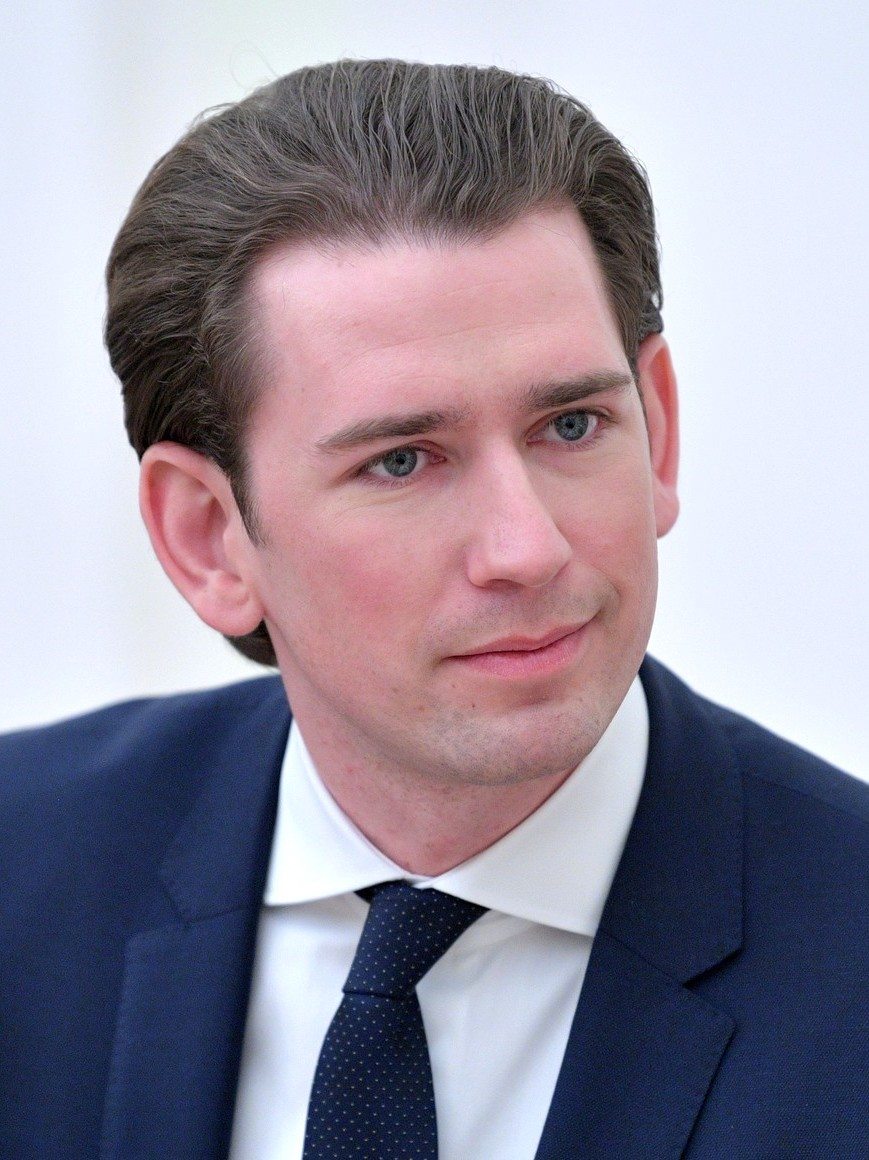
Sebastian Kurz

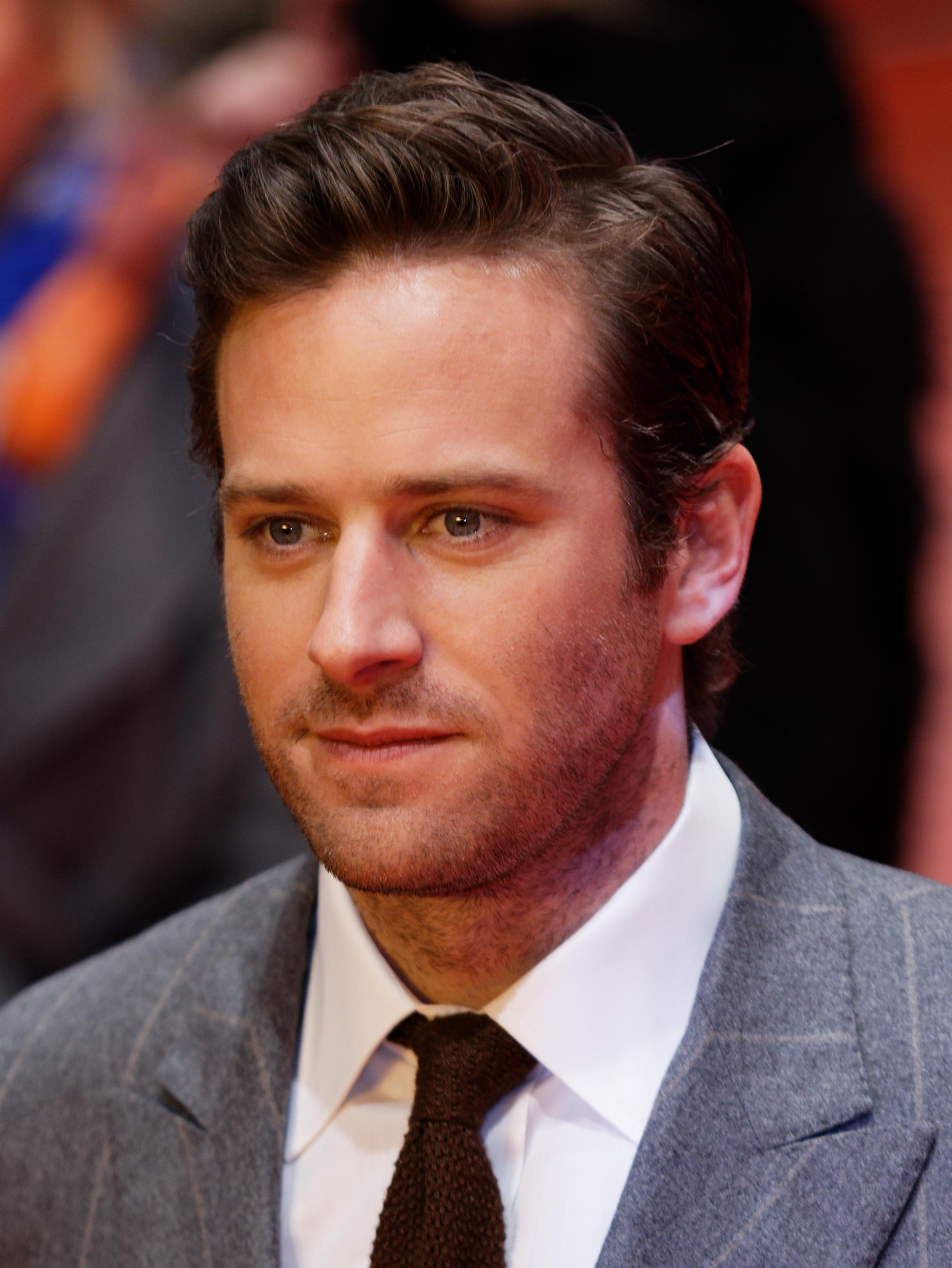
Armie Hammer

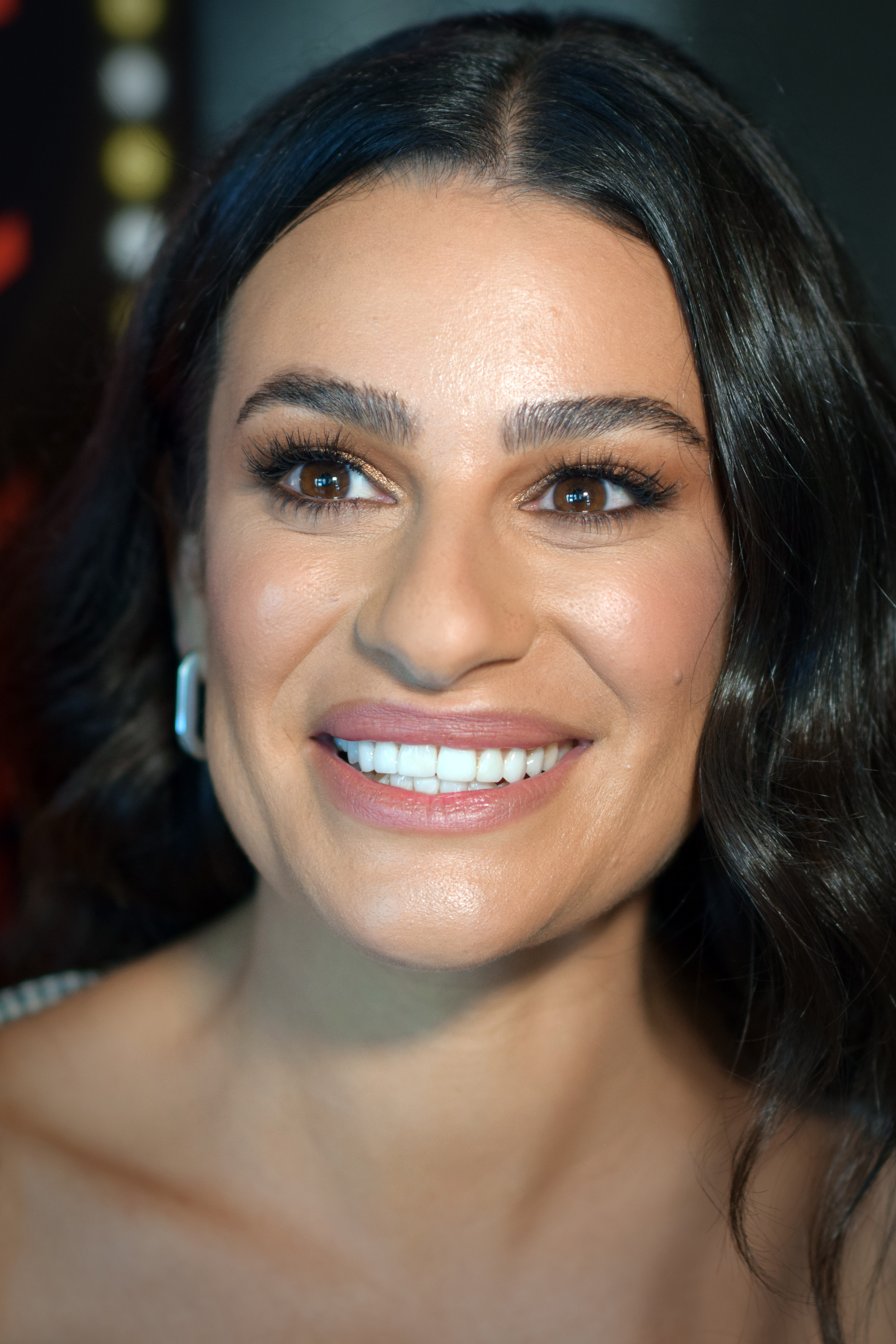
Lea Michele

- August 1
  - Josh Harder, American politician
  - Daisy May Cooper, English actress and writer
  - Elena Vesnina, Russian tennis player
- August 2 – Lily Gladstone, Native-American actress
- August 3
  - Charlotte Casiraghi, Monegasque heiress, royal and socialite
  - Darya Domracheva, Belarusian biathlete and coach
  - Prince Louis of Luxembourg, Prince of Luxembourg
- August 4 – Oleg Ivanov, Russian footballer
- August 5
  - Paula Creamer, American golfer
  - Kyoko Oshima, Japanese artistic gymnast
- August 6
  - Nanna Blondell, Swedish actress
  - Bryan Young, Canadian ice hockey player
- August 7
  - Altaír Jarabo, Mexican actress and model
  - Paul Biedermann, German swimmer
- August 8
  - Kateryna Volodko, Ukrainian tennis player
  - Jackie Cruz, Dominican-American actress
  - Peyton List, American actress
  - Paula Forteza, French-Argentine politician
- August 11
  - Kaori Fukuhara, Japanese voice actress
  - Colby Rasmus, American baseball player
- August 13 – Demetrious Johnson, American mixed martial artist and former 11-time UFC Flyweight World Champion, and also the current ONE Flyweight World Champion
- August 14 – Nigel Boogaard, Australian footballer
- August 15 – Teddy Sinclair, English singer-songwriter
- August 16
  - Yu Darvish, Japanese baseball player
  - Sarah Pavan, Canadian beach volleyball player
  - Kany Diabaté Ahn, French dancer and choreographer
- August 18
  - Antonin Rouzier, French volleyball player
  - Miesha Tate, American professional mixed martial artist
- August 19
  - Christina Perri, American pop and rock musician
  - Tian Qing, Chinese badminton player
- August 20 – Ryo Katsuji, Japanese actor and voice actor
- August 21
  - Usain Bolt, Jamaican sprinter
  - Brooks Wheelan, American actor, comedian and writer
  - Paetongtarn Shinawatra - 31st Prime Minister of Thailand
- August 22
  - Keiko Kitagawa, Japanese actress
  - Benjamin Satterley, English professional wrestler
    - Syko Stu, American wrestler
- August 23
  - Ayron Jones, American musician
  - Neil Cicierega, American Internet artist
  - Andra, Romanian singer
- August 26
  - Big K.R.I.T., American rapper
  - Cassie Ventura, American singer, songwriter, model, actress and dancer
  - Saint Jhn, Guyanese-American rapper, singer, songwriter, and record producer
- August 27 – Sebastian Kurz, Austrian politician, 25th Chancellor of Austria
- August 28
  - Briggs, Australian rapper
  - Armie Hammer, American actor
  - Gilad Shalit, Israeli soldier/hostage
  - Florence Welch, British singer
- August 29
  - Lea Michele, American actress, singer, and author
  - Hajime Isayama, Japanese manga artist, and creator of Attack on Titan
- August 30 – Ryan Ross, American guitarist
- August 31
  - Melanie Schlanger, Australian freestyle swimmer
  - Feng Tianwei, Singaporean table tennis player
  - Johnny Wactor, American actor (d. 2024)

=== September ===
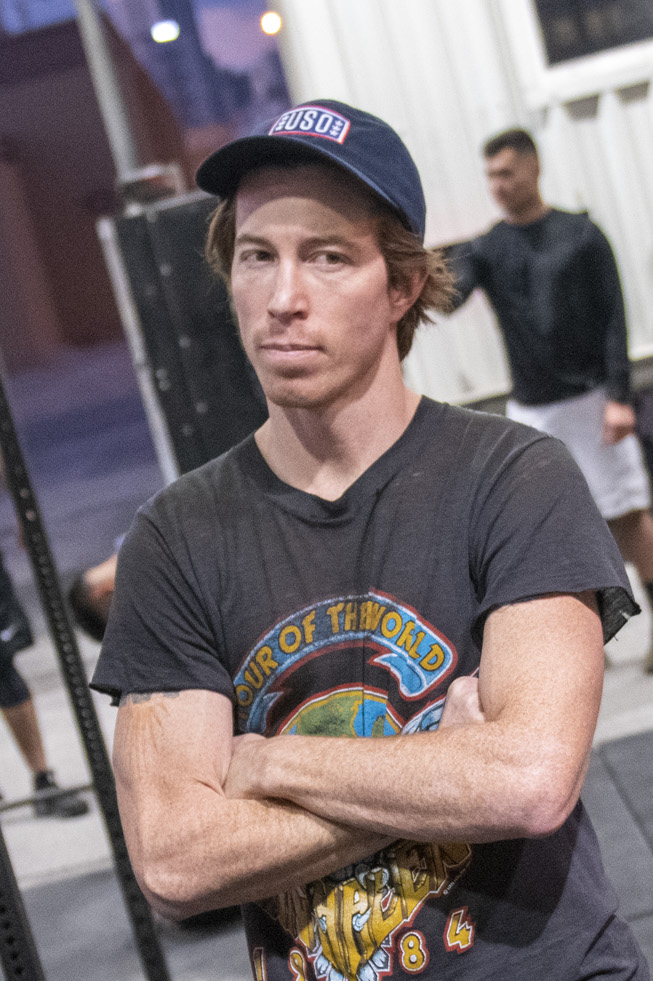
Shaun White

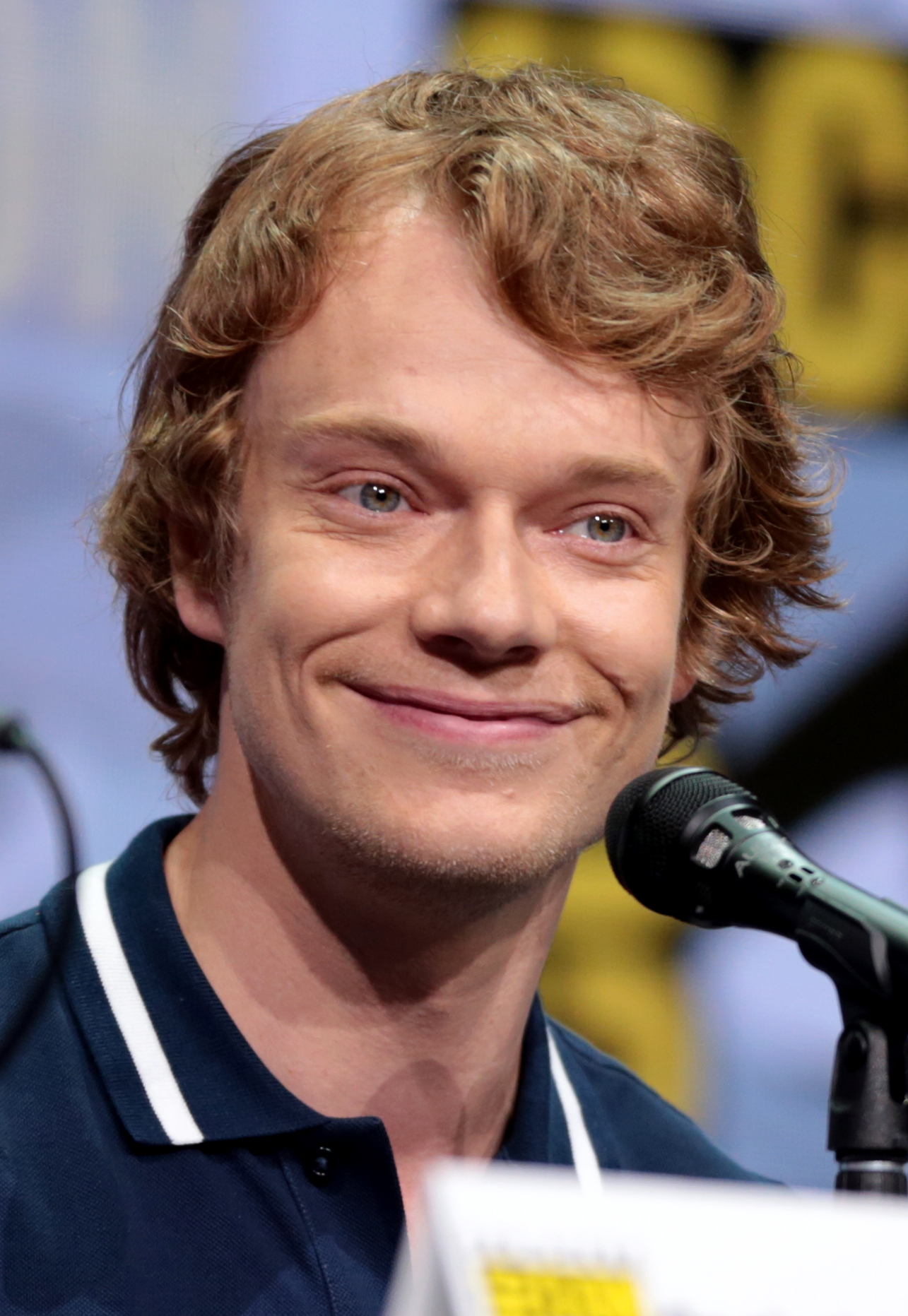
Alfie Allen

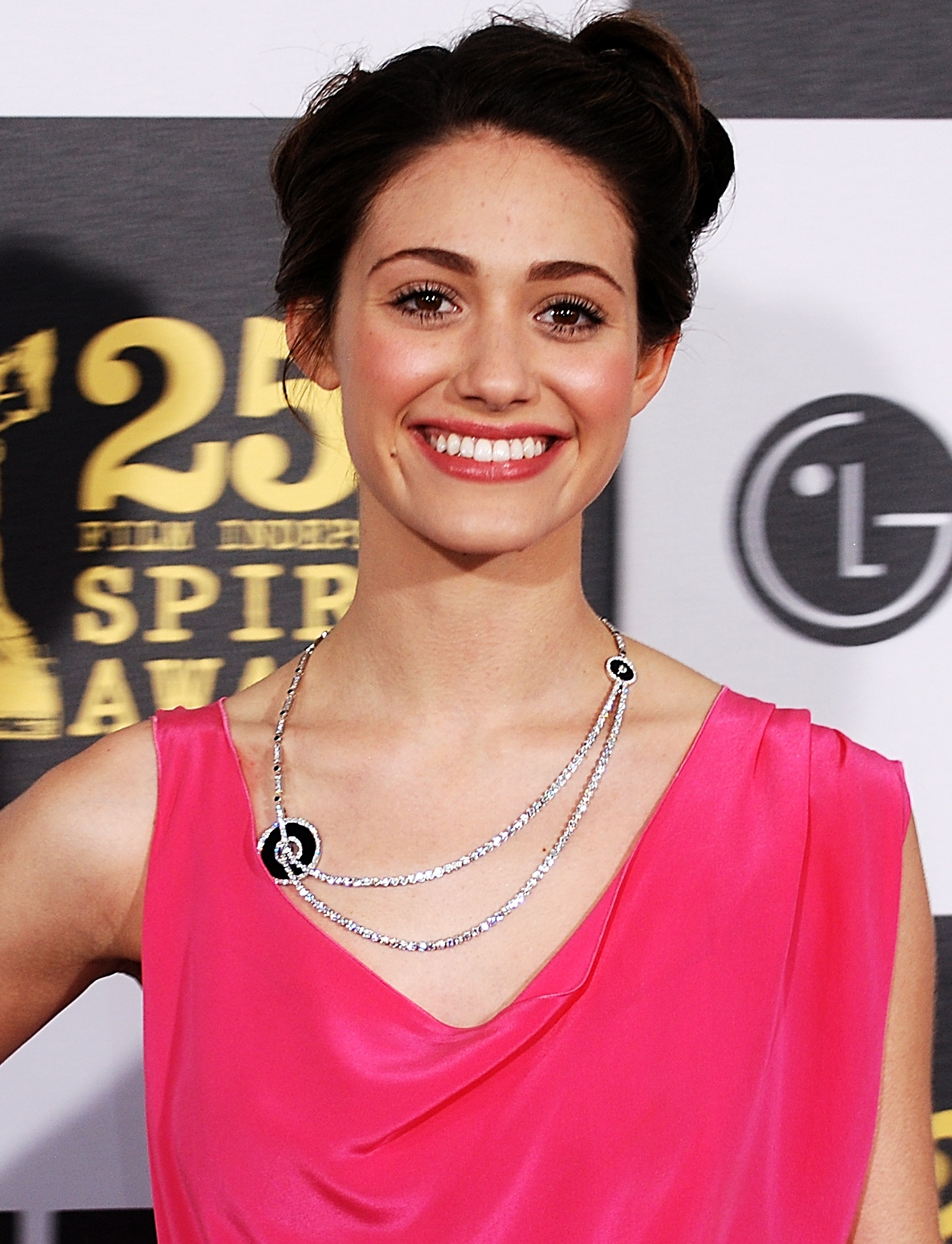
Emmy Rossum

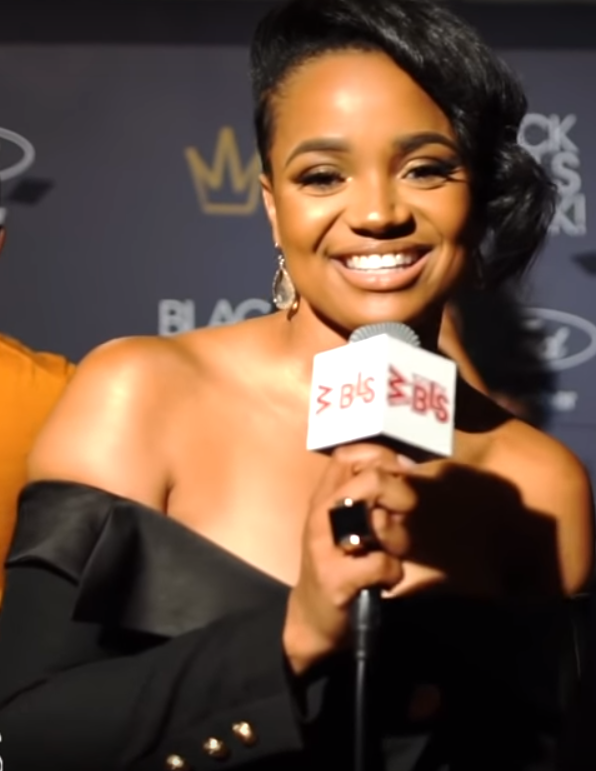
Kyla Pratt

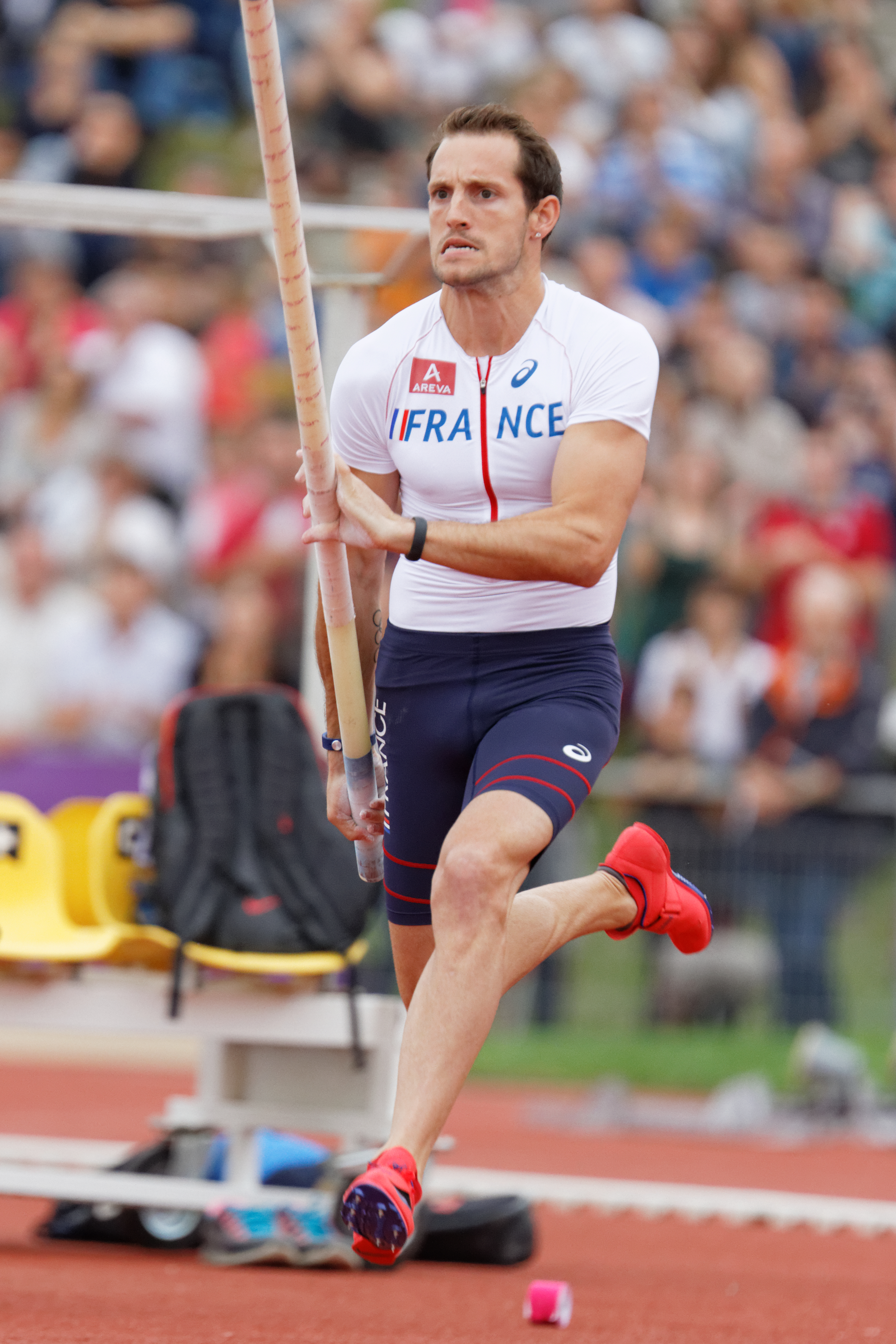
Renaud Lavillenie

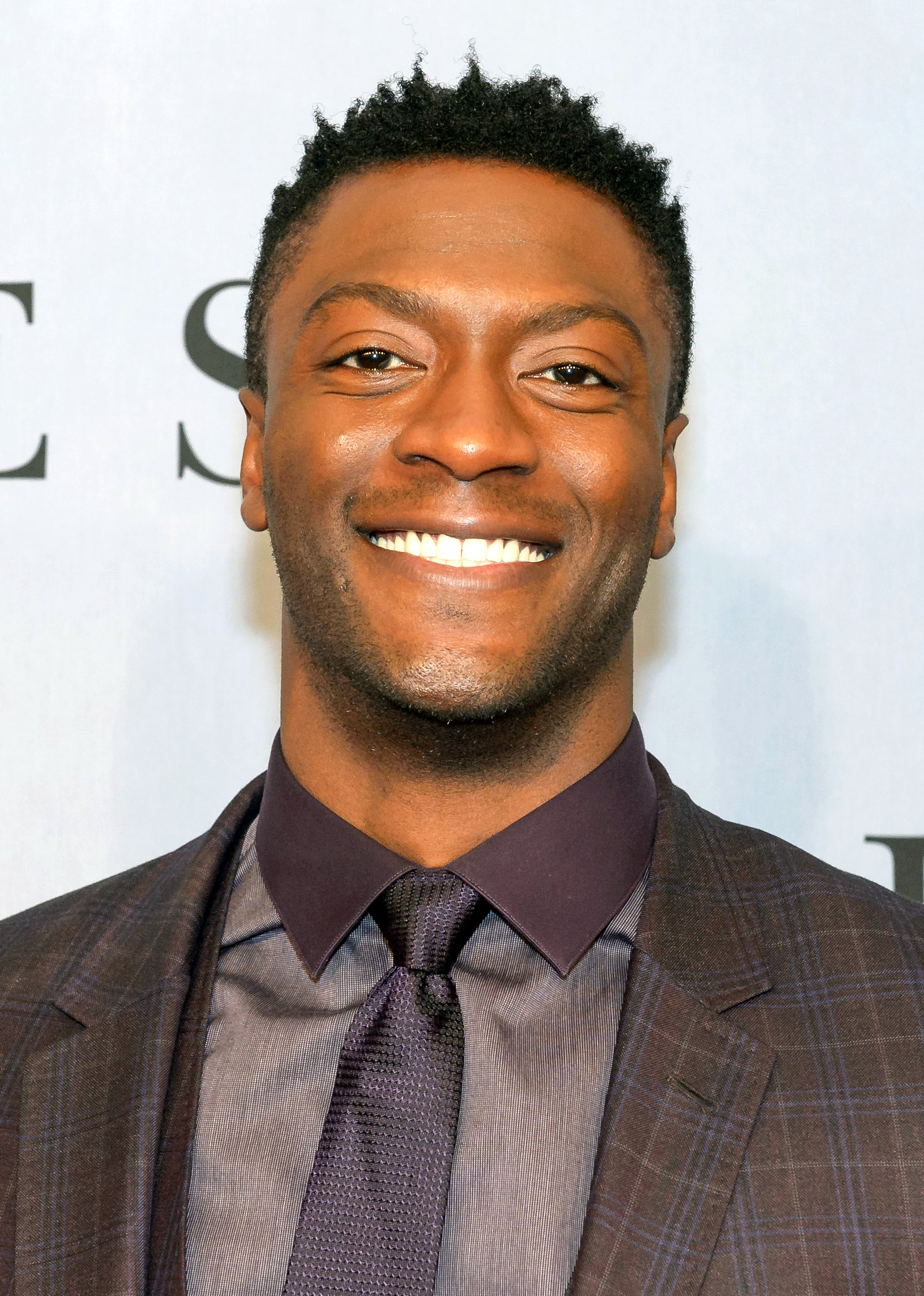
Aldis Hodge

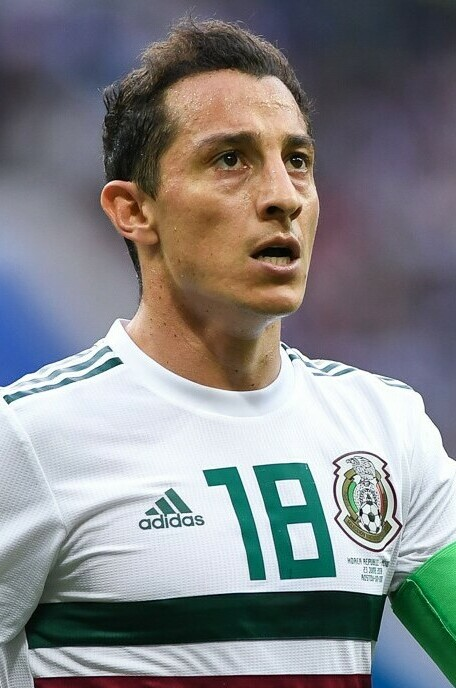
Andrés Guardado

- September 1 – Jean Sarkozy, French politician
- September 2
  - Moses Ndiema Kipsiro, Ugandan middle-distance runner
  - Stevan Faddy, Montenegrin singer
- September 3
  - OMI, Jamaican-born singer
  - Shaun White, American professional snowboarder
- September 4
  - Jaclyn Hales, American actress
  - Xavier Woods, American professional wrestler
- September 5 – Francis Ngannou, Cameroonian Professional MMA Fighter
- September 7 – Charlie Daniels, English footballer
- September 8
  - Leah LaBelle, Canadian-born American singer (d. 2018)
- September 9 – José Aldo, Brazilian mixed martial artist
- September 10 – Sarah Levy, Canadian actress
- September 12
  - Alfie Allen, English actor
  - Yuto Nagatomo, Japanese footballer
  - Emmy Rossum, American actress and singer
  - Yang Mi, Chinese actress and singer
- September 13 – Kamui Kobayashi, Japanese professional racing driver
- September 14
  - Michelle Jenner, Spanish actress
  - Tinchy Stryder, Ghanaian musician
  - Ai Takahashi, Japanese singer
- September 15
  - Jenna Marbles, American YouTuber
  - Heidi Montag, American television personality
- September 16 – Kyla Pratt, American actress
- September 18
  - Keeley Hazell, English model and actress
  - Renaud Lavillenie, French pole vaulter
- September 19
  - Mandy Musgrave, American actress
  - Sally Pearson, Australian athlete
  - Ilya Salmanzadeh, Swedish music producer
  - Peter Vack, American actor, writer, director and producer
- September 20
  - Aldis Hodge, American actor
  - Diego Sinagra, Italian footballer
- September 21
  - Lindsey Stirling, American violinist, dancer, performance artist, and composer
  - Satoshi Takayama, Japanese politician
- September 24
  - Leah Dizon, American singer and model
  - Eloise Mumford, American actress
- September 25 – Jiang Tingting, Chinese synchronized swimmer
- September 26 – Ashley Leggat, Canadian actress
- September 27 – Natasha Thomas, Danish singer and songwriter
- September 28 – Andrés Guardado, Mexican footballer
- September 30
  - Cristián Zapata, Colombian footballer
  - Olivier Giroud, French footballer
  - Ki Hong Lee, Korean-American actor

=== October ===
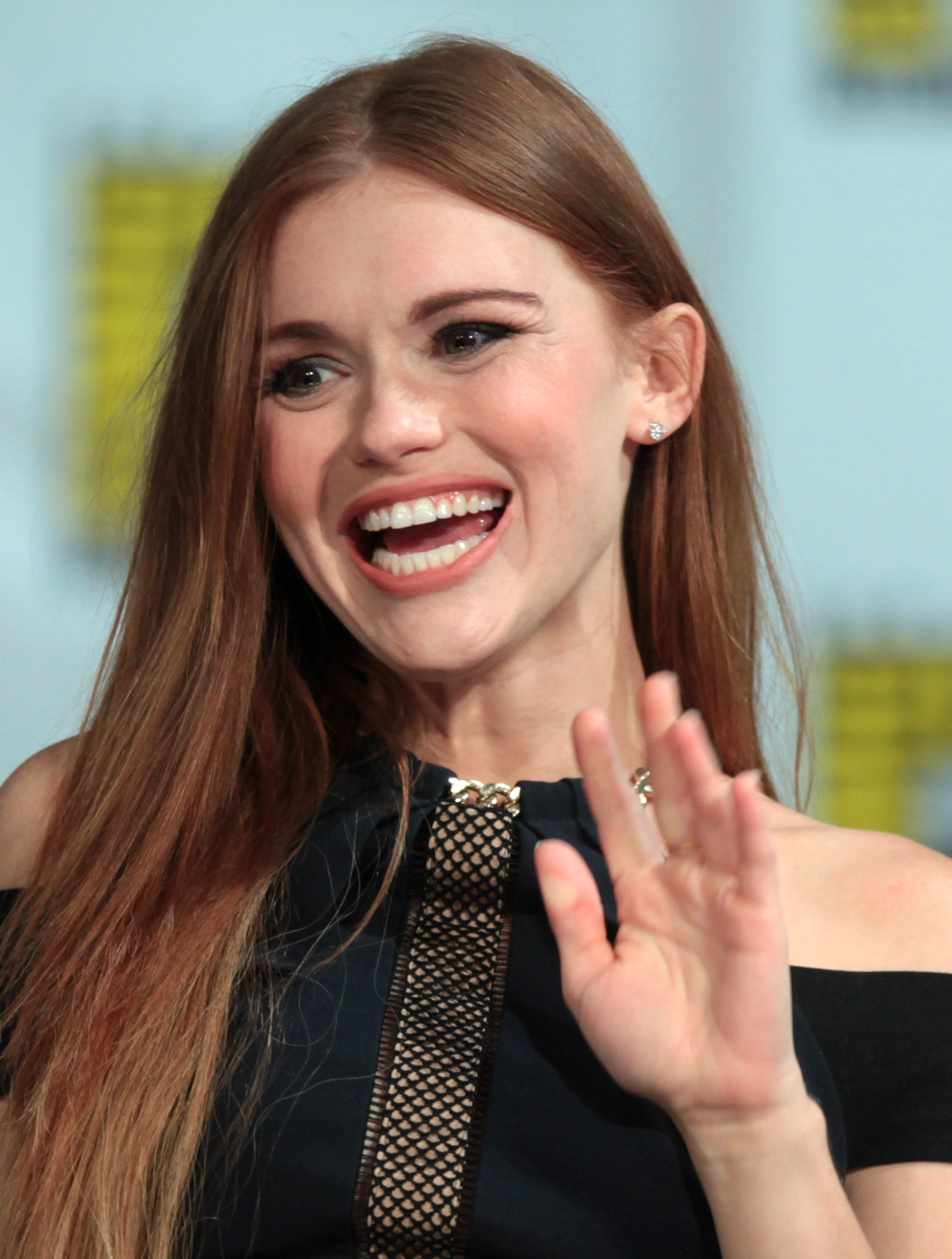
Holland Roden

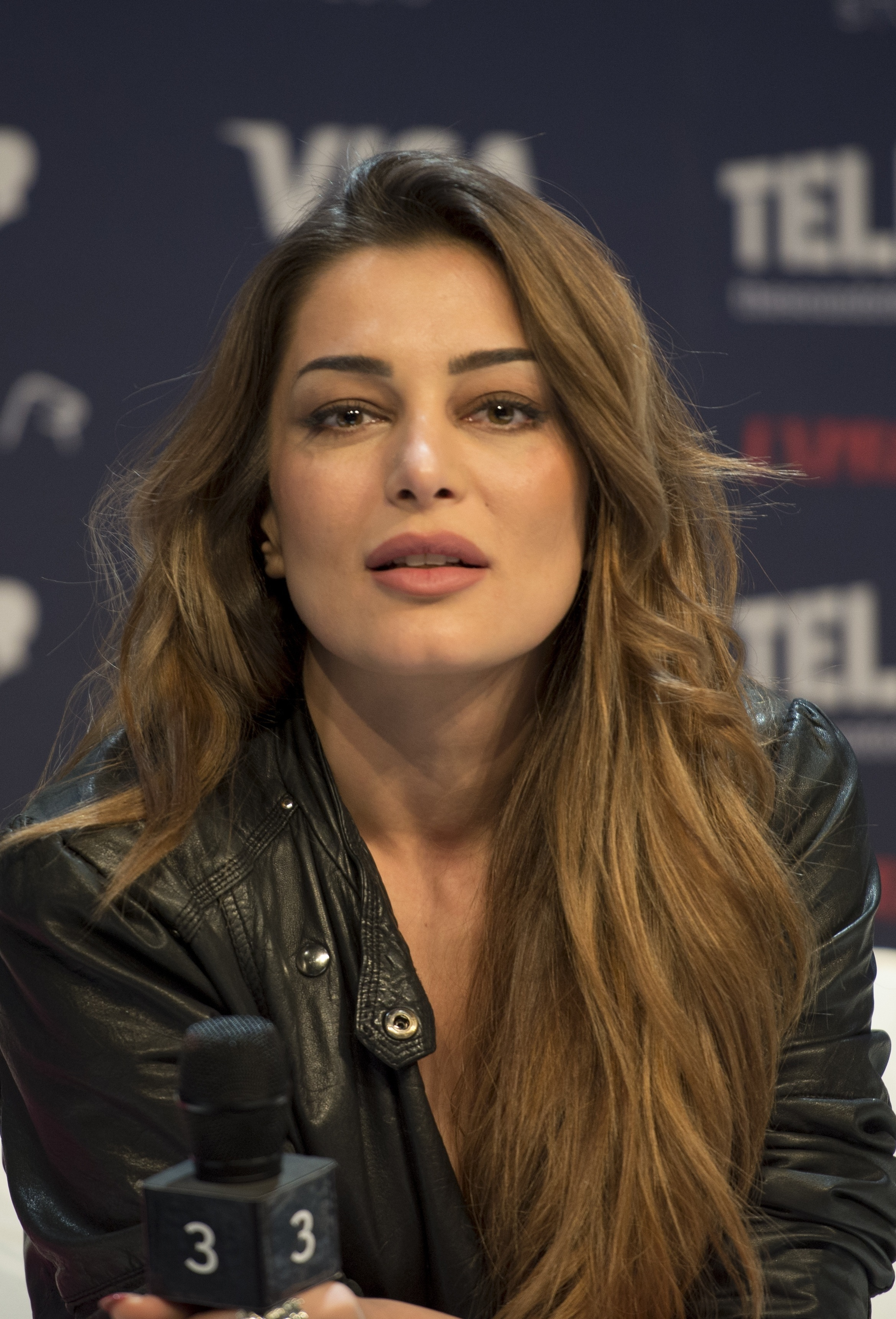
Iveta Mukuchyan

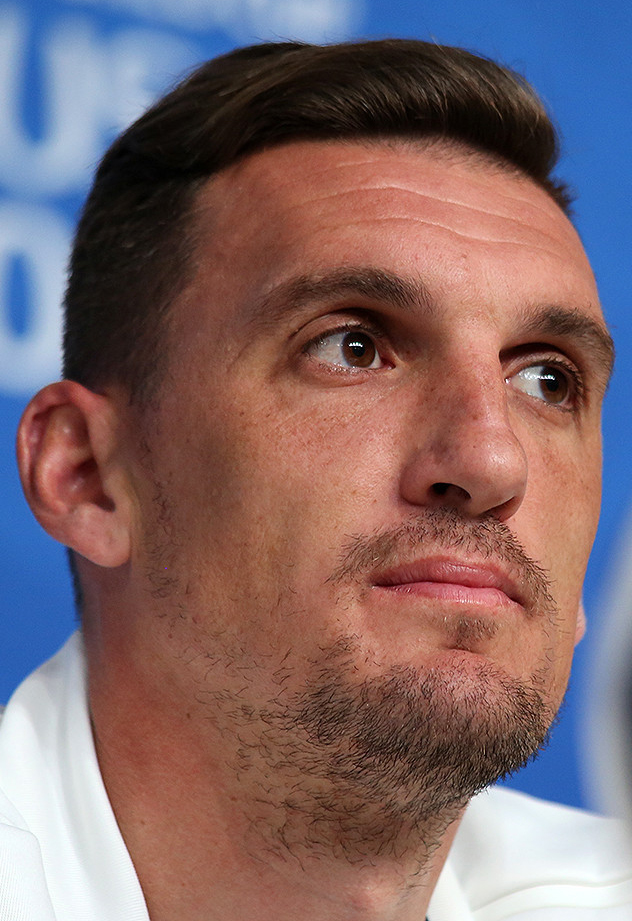
Franco Armani

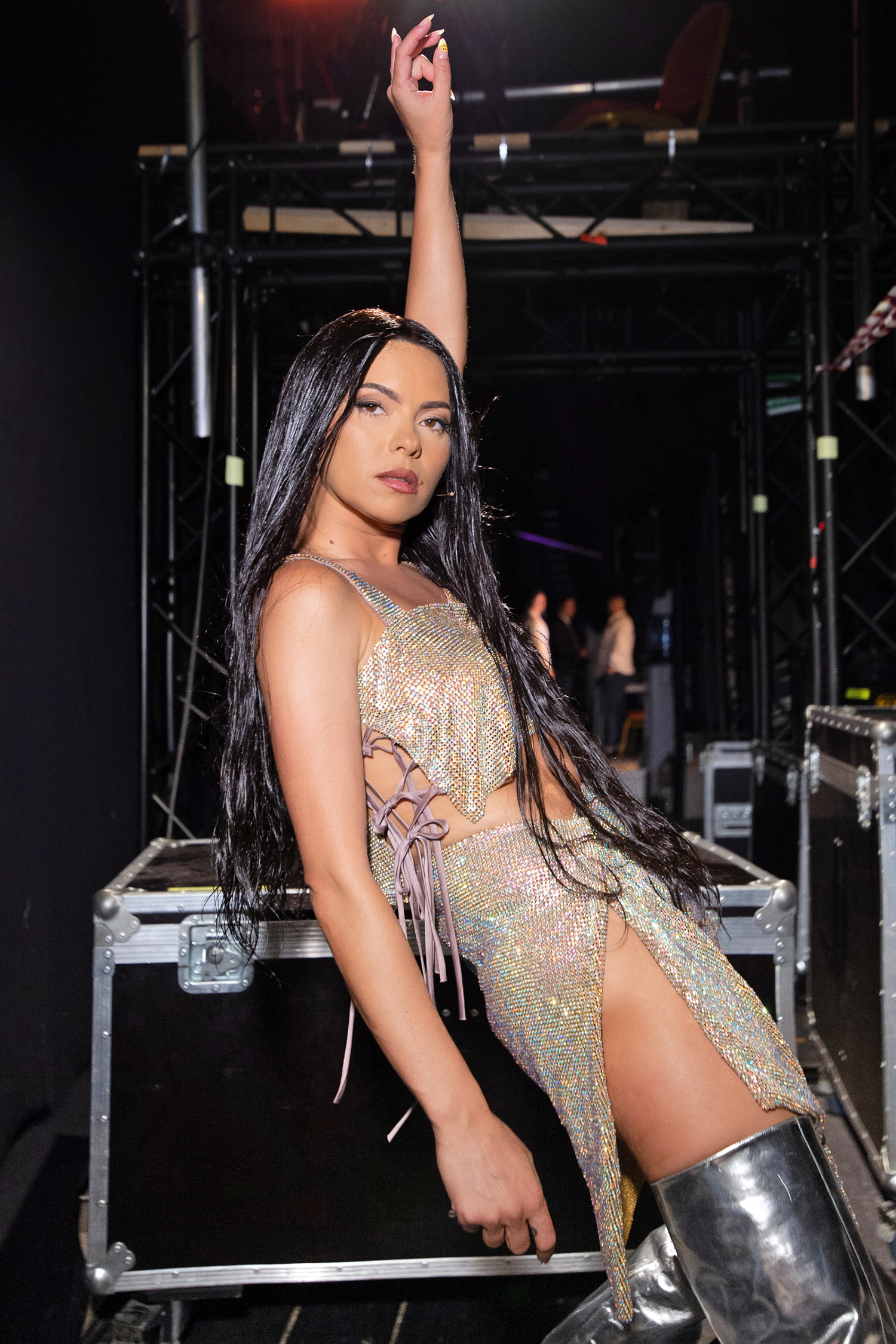
Inna

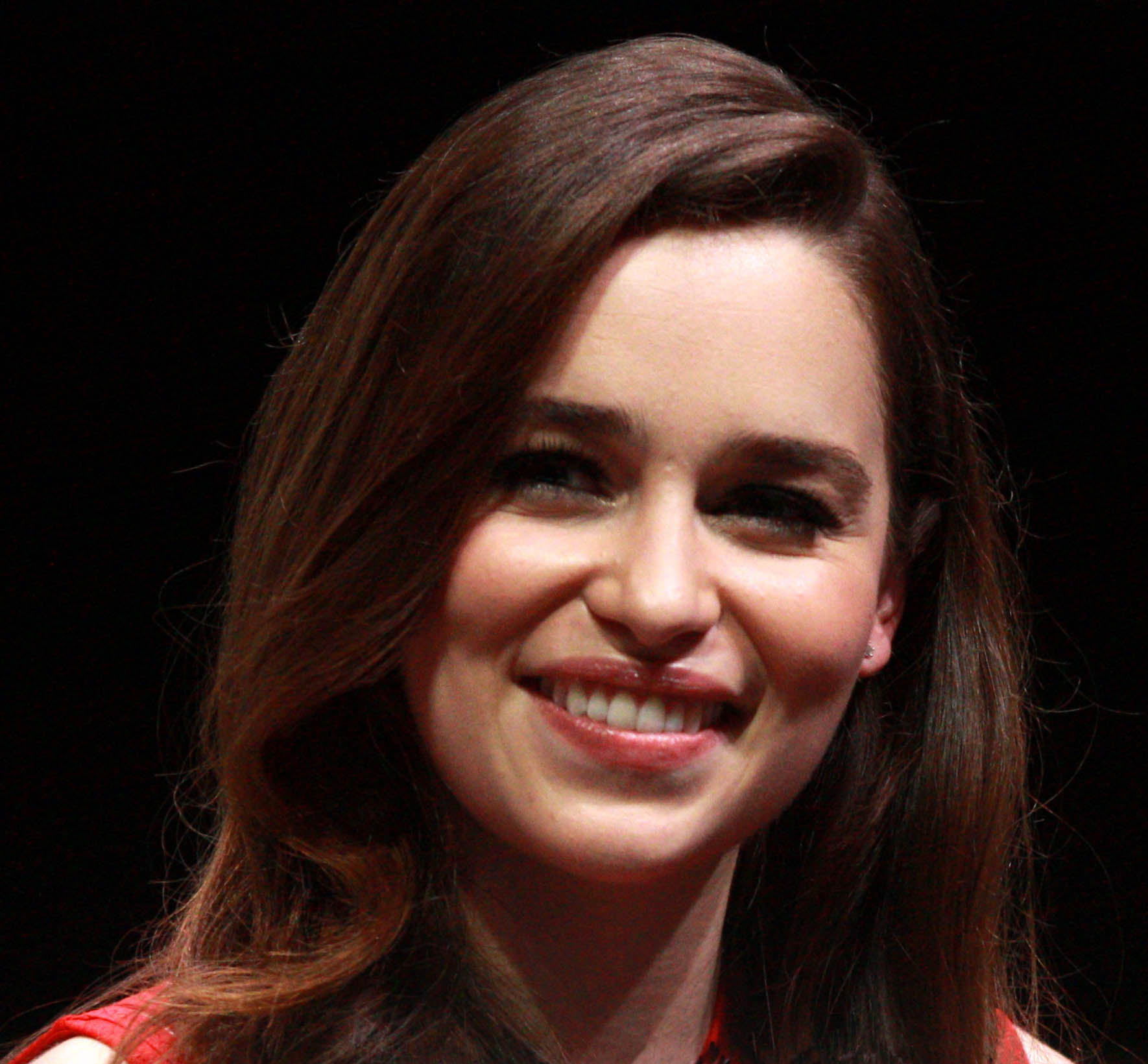
Emilia Clarke

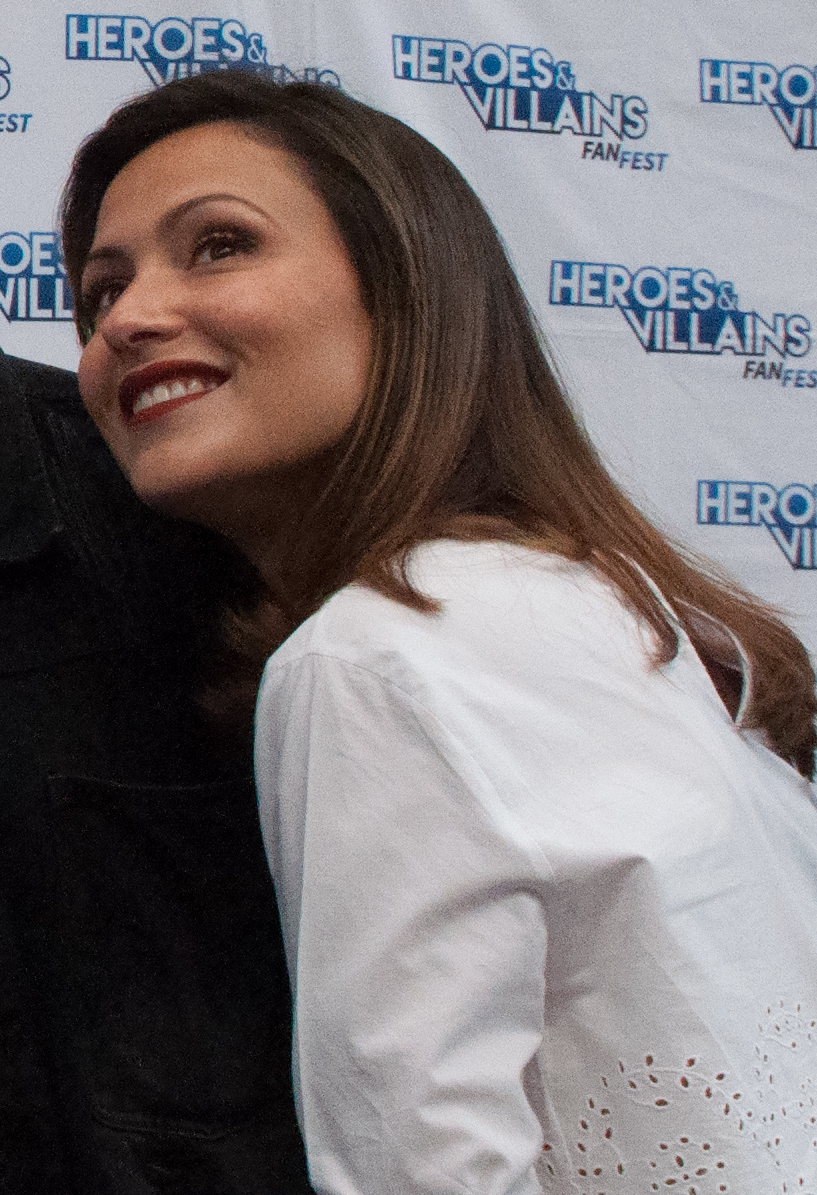
Italia Ricci

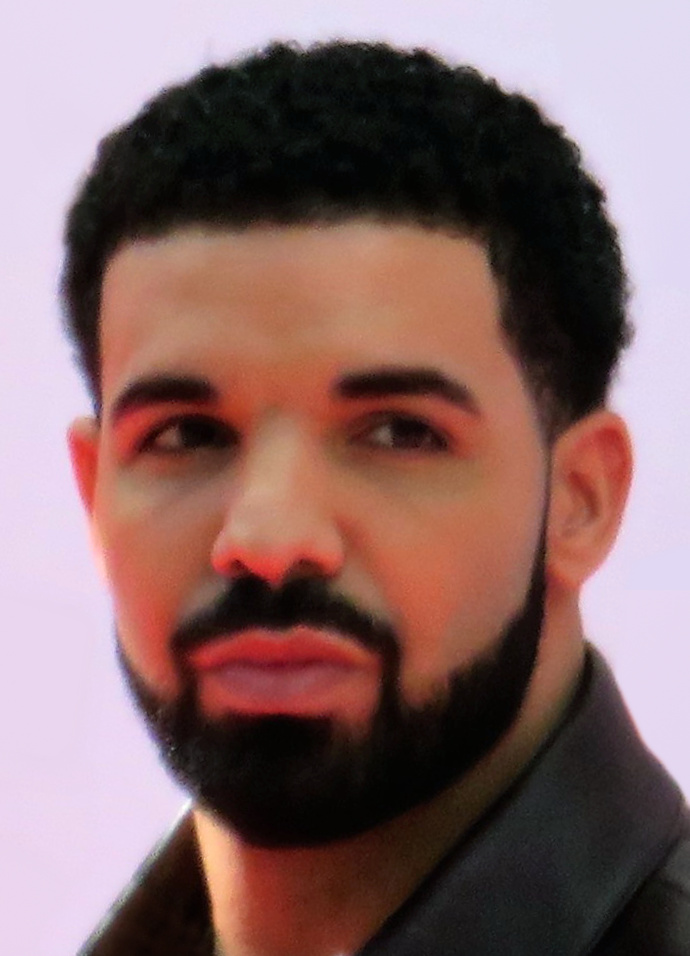
Drake

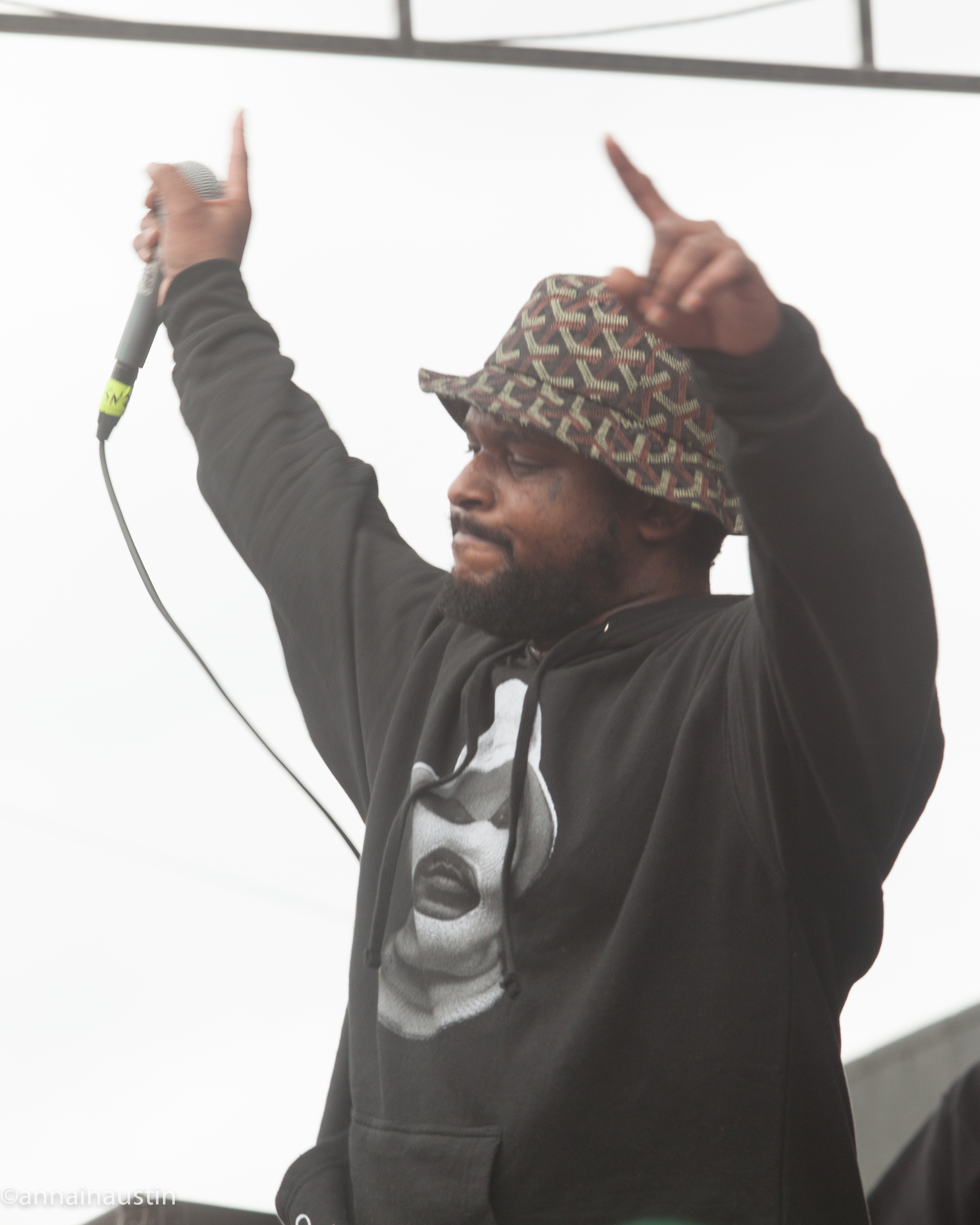
Schoolboy Q

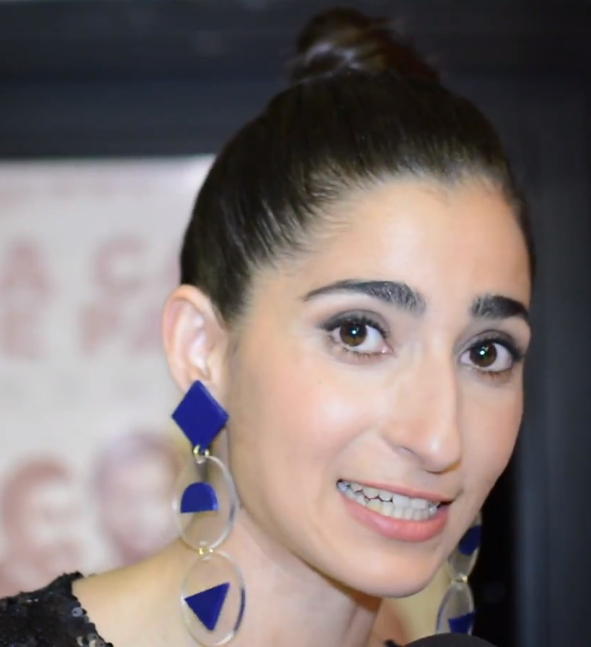
Alba Flores

- October 1
  - Sayaka Kanda, Japanese actress and singer (d. 2021)
  - Jurnee Smollett, American actress
- October 2
  - Camilla Belle, Brazilian-American actress, director, writer and producer
  - Kiko Casilla, Spanish footballer
- October 3 – Joonas Suotamo, Finnish basketball player and actor
- October 4
  - Sara Forestier, French actress
  - Nina Vislova, Russian badminton player
- October 5 – Novica Veličković, Serbian basketball player
- October 6
  - Luisa D'Oliveira, Canadian actress
  - Tereza Kerndlová, Czech singer
  - Olivia Thirlby, American actress
- October 7
  - Holland Roden, American actress
  - Amber Stevens West, American actress and model
- October 9
  - Ezequiel Garay, Argentine footballer
  - Blagoy Ivanov, Bulgarian mixed martial artist
  - Laure Manaudou, French swimmer
- October 10
  - Lucy Griffiths, English actress
  - Nathan Jawai, Australian basketball player
- October 12
  - Tyler Blackburn, American actor, singer and model
  - Cristhian Stuani, Uruguayan footballer
  - Li Wenliang, Chinese ophthalmologist (he warned about COVID-19) (d. 2020)
- October 13 – Gabby Agbonlahor, English footballer
- October 14
  - Wesley Matthews, American basketball player
  - Iveta Mukuchyan, Armenian singer, model and actress
  - Skyler Shaye, American actress
- October 15
  - Ali Fazal, Indian actor
  - Paul Walter Hauser, American actor
  - Lee Donghae, Korean singer
- October 16
  - Franco Armani, Argentine footballer
  - Jordan Larson, American volleyball player
  - Craig Pickering, English sprinter
  - Inna, Romanian singer
- October 17 – Mohombi, Congolese-Swedish urban singer-songwriter and dancer
- October 18 – Loukas Giorkas, Greek-Cypriot singer and model
- October 19 – Monday James, Nigerian footballer
- October 20 – Elyse Taylor, Australian model
- October 21
  - Almen Abdi, Serbian born-Swiss footballer
  - Tamerlan Tsarnaev, Russian-American terrorist (d. 2013)
  - Christopher von Uckermann, Mexican-Swedish singer, songwriter and actor
- October 22
  - Kyle Gallner, American actor
  - Kara Lang, Canadian soccer player
- October 23
  - Emilia Clarke, English actress
  - Jessica Stroup, American actress and fashion model
  - LoLa Monroe, American rapper, model and actress
- October 24
  - Drake, Canadian actor and hip-hop rapper
  - Nobuhiko Okamoto, Japanese voice actor and singer
  - John Ruddy, English footballer
- October 25 – Chiquito Felipe do Carmo, East Timorese football player
- October 26 – Schoolboy Q, American rapper
- October 27
  - Alba Flores, Spanish actress
  - Erica Dasher, American actress
  - Inbar Lavi, Israeli actress
- October 28
  - May Calamawy, Egyptian-Palestinian actress
  - Tamar Kaprelian, Armenian-American musician and singer
- October 29
  - Italia Ricci, Canadian actress
  - Derek Theler, American actor
- October 30
  - Thomas Morgenstern, Austrian Olympic ski jumper
  - Hiba Abouk, Spanish-Tunisian actress

=== November ===
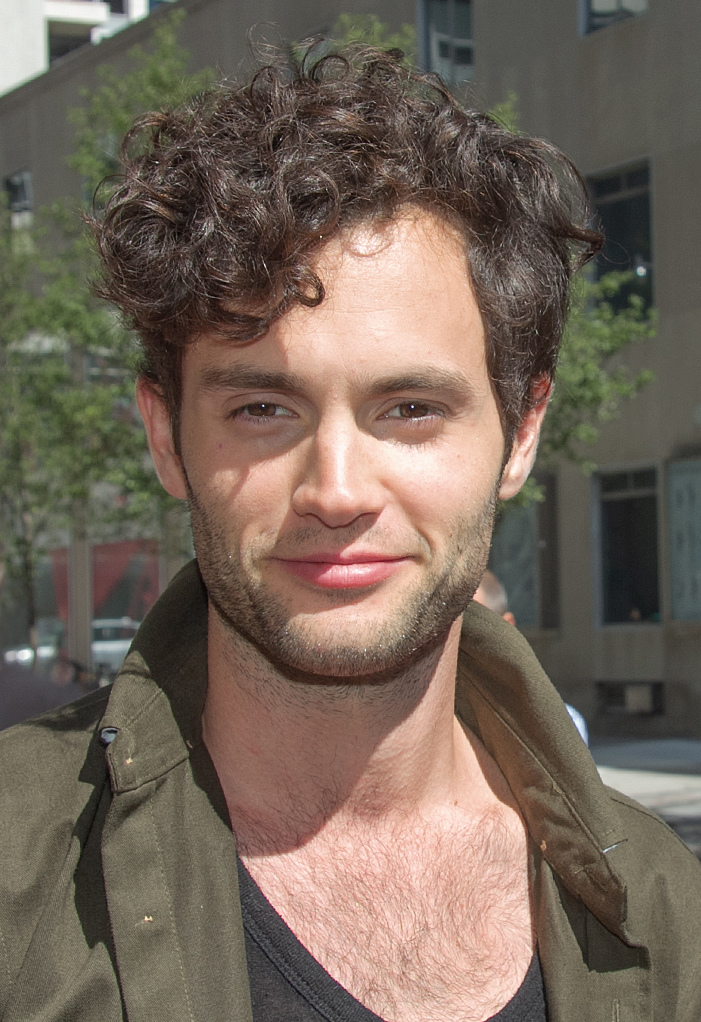
Penn Badgley

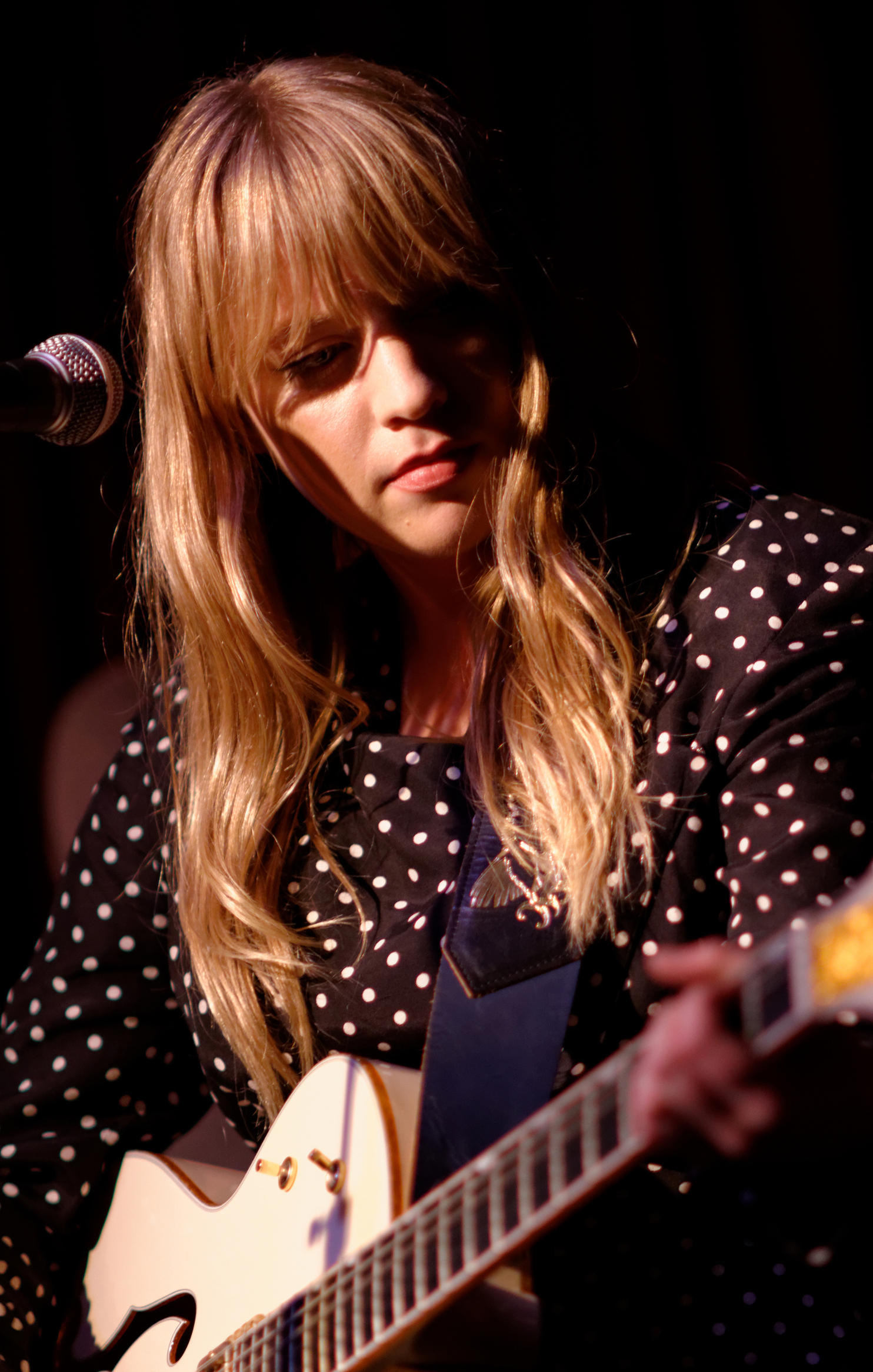
Alexz Johnson

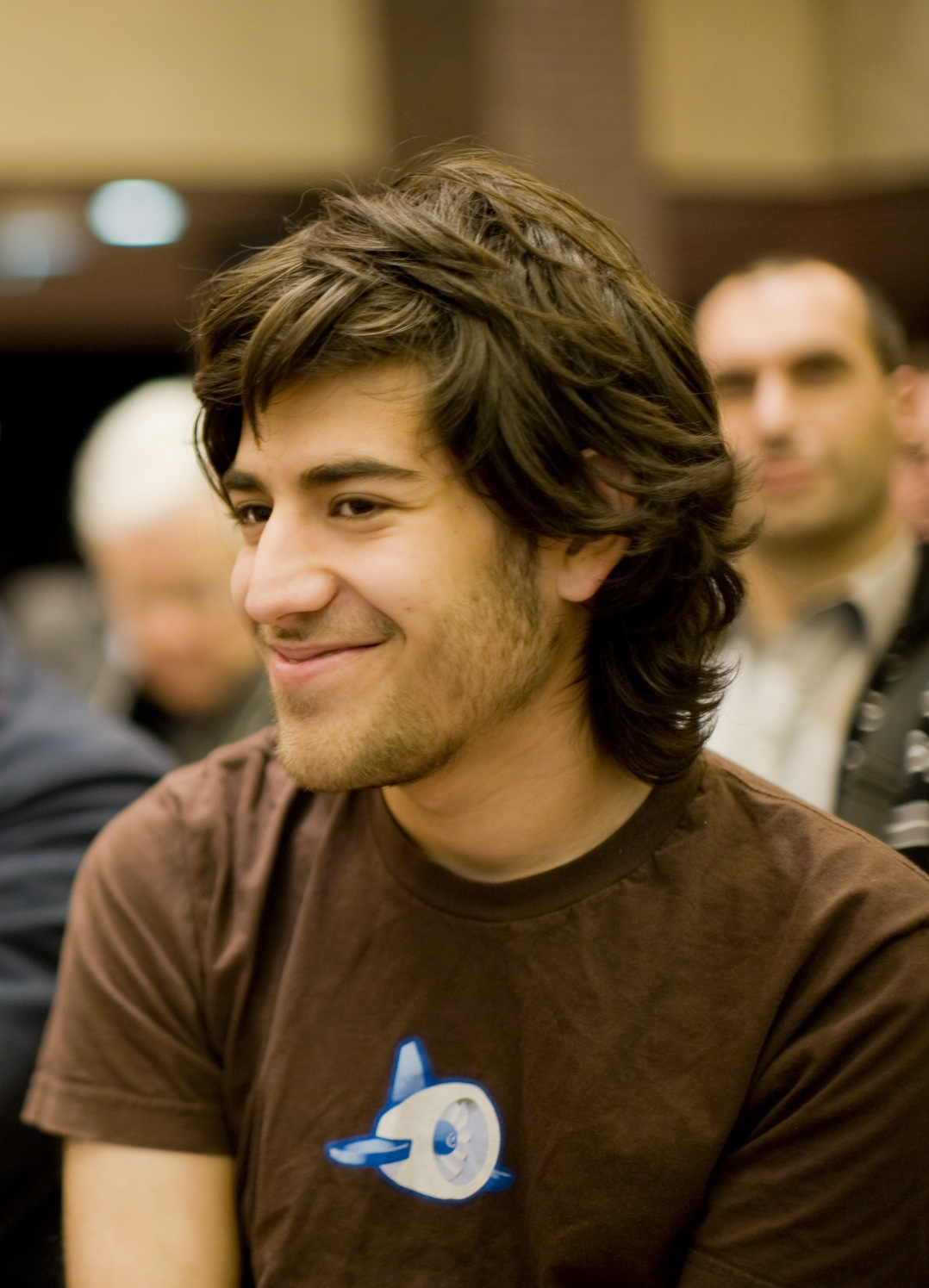
Aaron Swartz

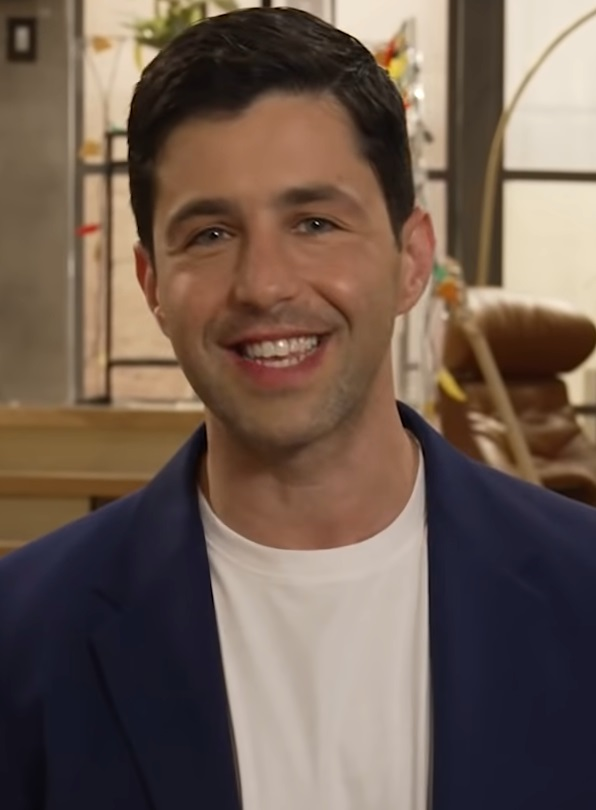
Josh Peck

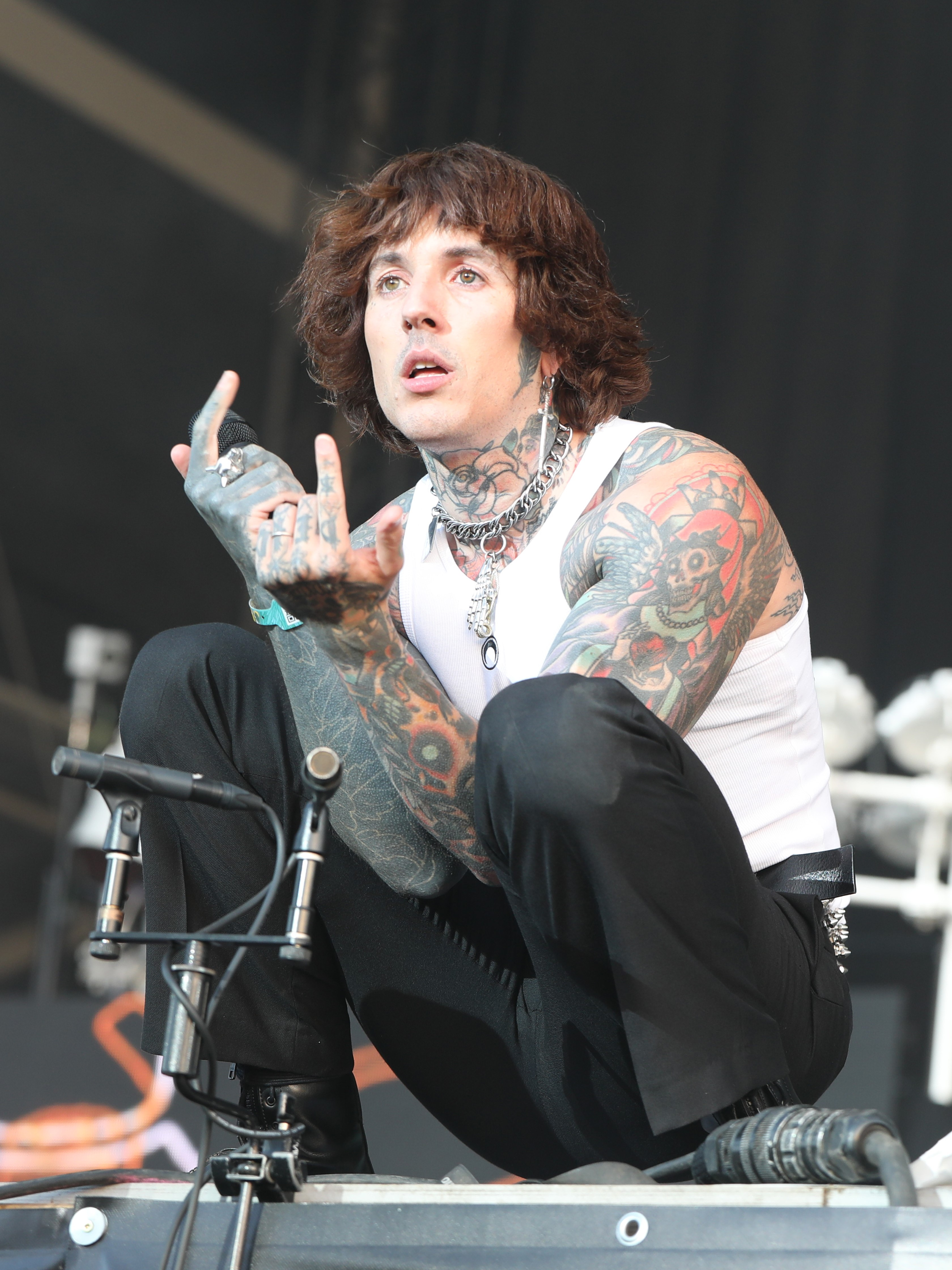
Oliver Sykes

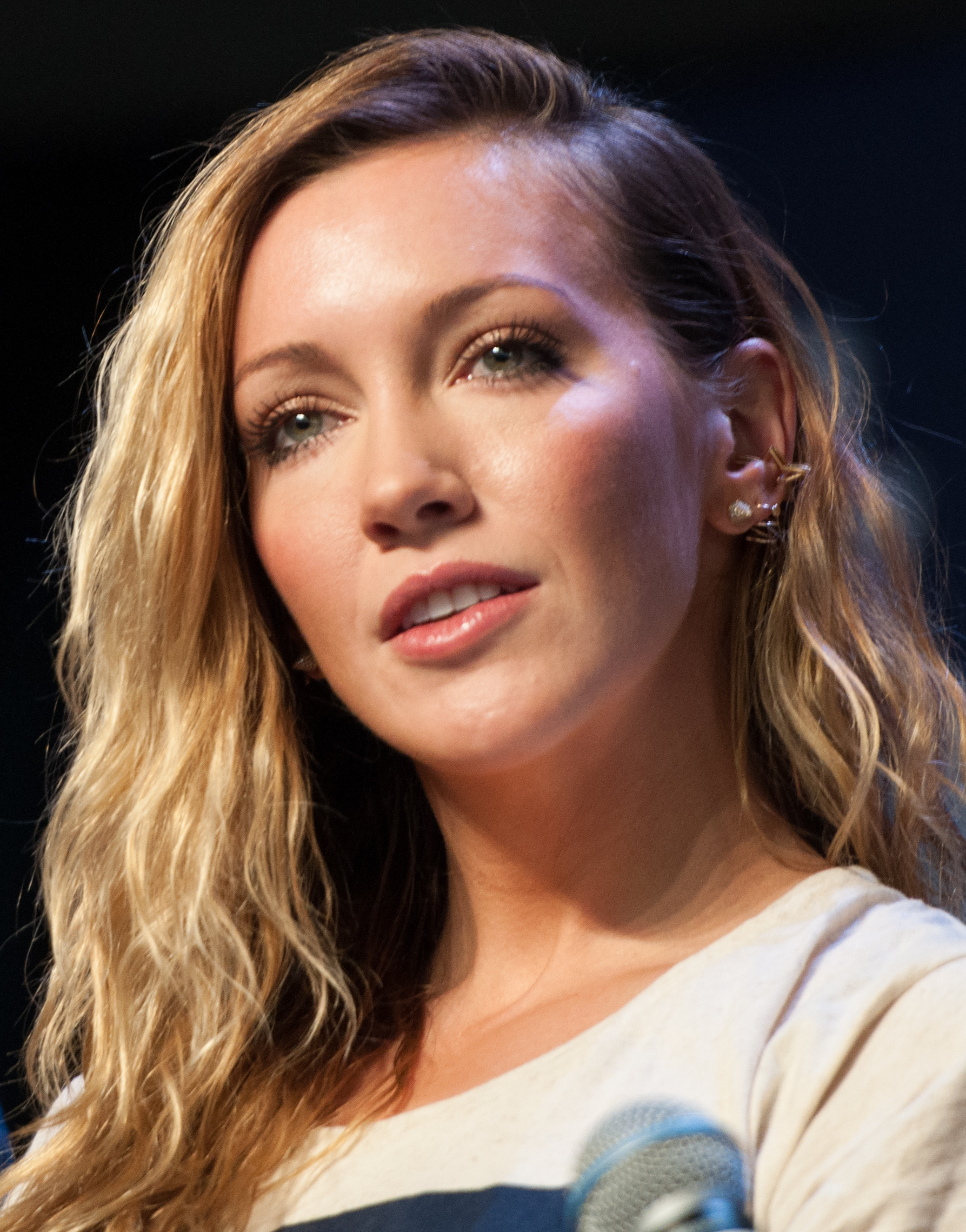
Katie Cassidy

- November 1 – Penn Badgley, American actor and musician
- November 3
  - Davon Jefferson, American basketball player
  - Jasmine Trias, Filipino singer
  - Heo Young-Saeng, South Korean singer
- November 4
  - Hanna Jaff, American born-Mexican journalist, media personality and business person
  - Alexz Johnson, Canadian actress and singer
  - Angelica Panganiban, Filipino-American actress and comedian
- November 5
  - Kasper Schmeichel, Danish footballer
  - Nodiko Tatishvili, Georgian singer
- November 8 – Aaron Swartz, American programmer (d. 2013)
- November 10
  - Nong-O Gaiyanghadao, Thai Muay Thai kickboxer and former ONE Bantamweight Muymay Thai World Champion
  - Andy Mientus, American actor, singer, composer and writer
  - Josh Peck, American actor and director
  - Eric Thames, American baseball player
  - Samuel Wanjiru, Kenyan athlete (d. 2011)
- November 11
  - François Trinh-Duc, French rugby player
  - Greta Salóme Stefánsdóttir, Icelandic singer and violinist
  - Radhika Kumaraswamy, Indian actress
  - Rafael de la Fuente, Venezuelan actor and singer
- November 12 – Evan Yo, Taiwanese singer-songwriter
- November 13 – Kevin Bridges, Scottish stand-up comedian
- November 14
  - Cory Michael Smith, American actor
  - Yuna, Malaysian singer, songwriter, and businesswoman
- November 15
  - Winston Duke, Tobagonian actor
  - Sania Mirza, Indian tennis player
  - Matthew Patrick, American web video producer
- November 17
  - Karmichael Hunt, New Zealand-Australian sportsperson
  - Nani, Cape Verde-born Portuguese footballer
  - Greg Rutherford, British athlete
  - Alexis Vastine, French boxer (d. 2015)
- November 19
  - Erin Hamlin, American luger
  - Dayron Robles, Cuban hurdler
- November 20
  - Ashley Fink, American actress and singer
  - Oliver Sykes, English musician and vocalist of Bring Me the Horizon
- November 21 – Sam Palladio, British actor and musician
- November 22
  - Oscar Pistorius, South African Paralympic runner
  - Sebastián Zurita, Mexican actor
- November 24
  - Jimmy Graham, American football player
  - Pedro León, Spanish soccer player
  - Micaela Vázquez, Argentine actress
- November 25 – Katie Cassidy, American singer and model
- November 26
  - Carly Gullickson, American tennis player
  - Kanae Ito, Japanese voice actress
- November 27 – Suresh Raina, Indian cricket player
- November 28 – Johnny Simmons, American actor

=== December ===
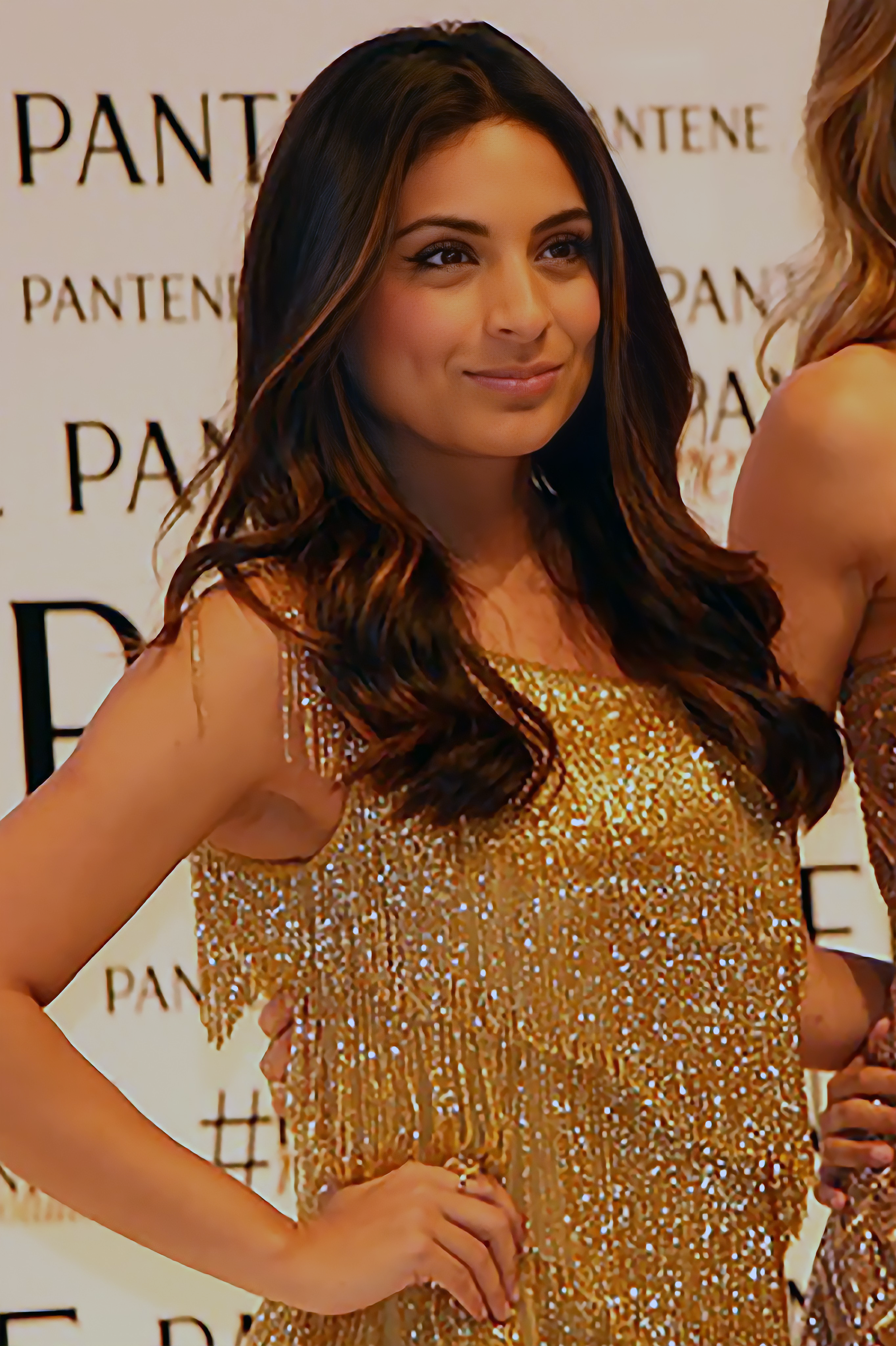
Ana Brenda Contreras

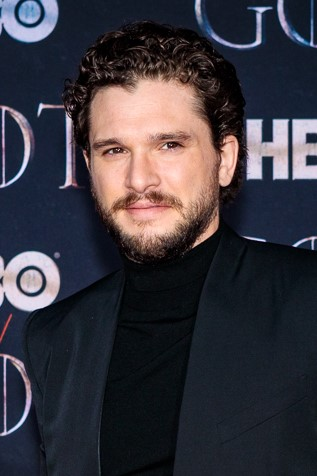
Kit Harington

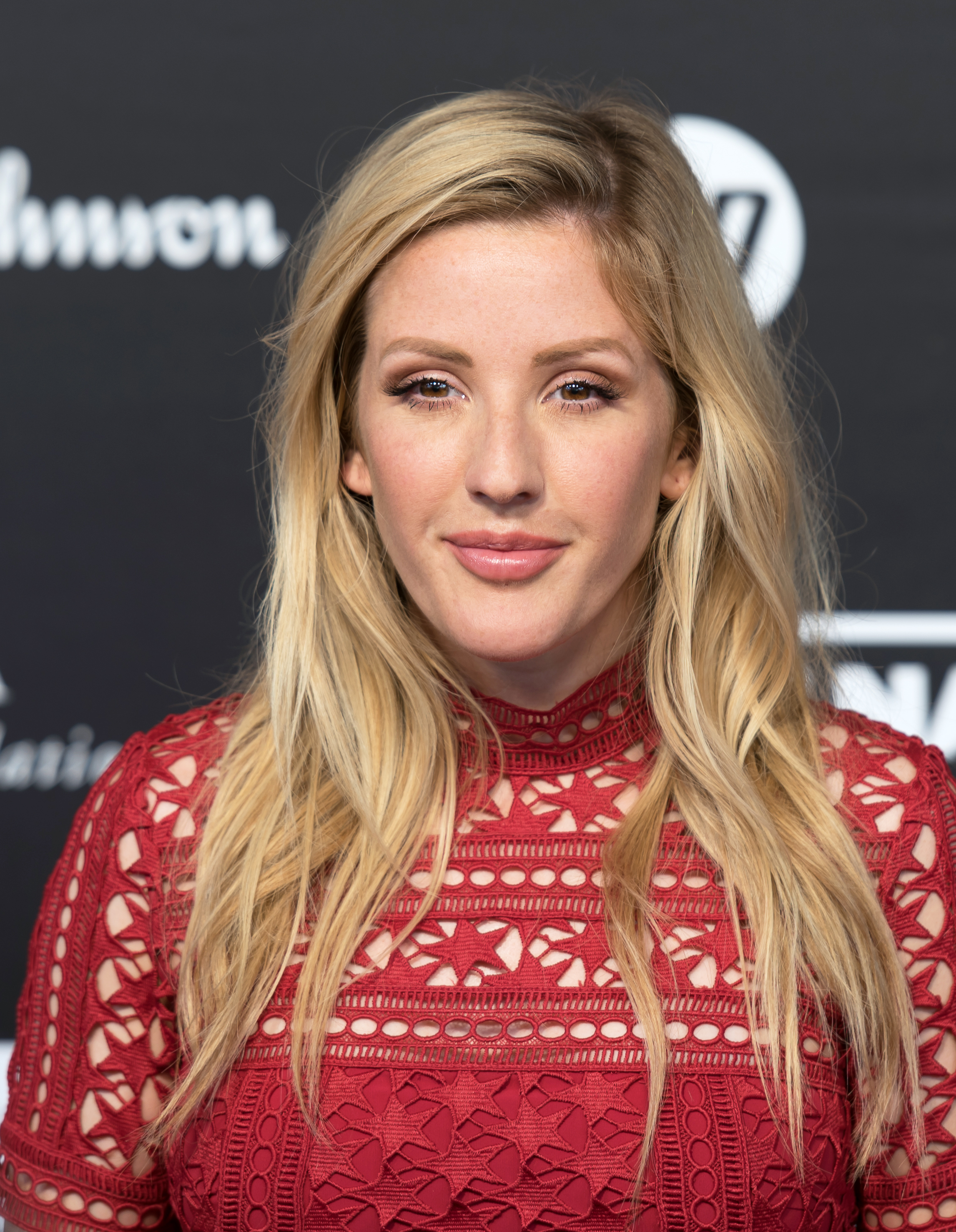
Ellie Goulding

- December 1
  - DeSean Jackson, American football player
  - Andrew Tate, American-British Internet personality and former professional kickboxer
- December 3 – Leah Wilkinson, British field hockey player
- December 4 – Martell Webster, American basketball player
- December 7 – Jakov Milatović, President of Montenegro
- December 8
  - Amir Khan, British boxer
  - Kate Voegele, American singer-songwriter and actress
- December 9 – Aron Baynes, Australian basketball player
- December 11
  - Alex House, Canadian actor
  - Lee Peltier, English footballer
  - Condola Rashad, American actress
- December 15
  - Lauren Boebert, American politician
  - Keylor Navas, Costa Rican footballer
  - Xiah, Korean singer
- December 17 – Emma Bell, American actress
- December 18 – Jery Sandoval, Colombian actress, model and singer
- December 19
  - Ryan Babel, Dutch footballer
  - Zuzana Hejnová, Czech hurdler
- December 23 – Balázs Dzsudzsák, Hungarian footballer
- December 24
  - Ana Brenda Contreras, Mexican actress and singer
  - Satomi Ishihara, Japanese actress
- December 26
  - Joe Alexander, American-Israeli basketball player
  - Mew Azama, Japanese actress
  - Kit Harington, British actor
  - Hugo Lloris, French footballer
  - Selen Soyder, Turkish actress, model and beauty pageant
- December 27
  - Jamaal Charles, American football player
  - Shelly-Ann Fraser-Pryce, Jamaican sprinter
  - Chris Rörland, Swedish metal musician and graphic designer
- December 29 – Kim Ok-vin, South Korean actress and model
- December 30
  - Onyekachi Apam, Nigerian footballer
  - Ellie Goulding, British singer
- Date unknown
  - Simone Bacci, Italian associate professor of Italian, conference interpreter and researcher in linguistics

== Nobel Prizes ==

- Physics – Ernst Ruska, Gerd Binnig, Heinrich Rohrer
- Chemistry – Dudley R. Herschbach, Yuan T. Lee, John Polanyi
- Physiology or Medicine – Stanley Cohen, Rita Levi-Montalcini
- Literature – Wole Soyinka
- Peace – Elie Wiesel
- Economics – James M. Buchanan
