= T.R.A.S.H. (Tubes Rarities and Smash Hits) =

Compilation album by The Tubes
- Released: November 1981
- Genre: Rock
- Label: A&M

The Tubes chronology
| Remote Control (1979) | T.R.A.S.H. (Tubes Rarities and Smash Hits) (1981) | The Completion Backward Principle (1981) |

T.R.A.S.H. (Tubes Rarities and Smash Hits) is a compilation album by the rock band The Tubes, released in November 1981.

== Background ==
After four studio albums and a live album for A&M Records, the band were working on the Suffer for Sound album when they were dropped by the label. They subsequently signed a deal with Capitol Records in 1981, but to fulfil their contract, A&M released this collection of recordings in November that year, including tracks from their early singles and unreleased material. One track from the shelved Suffer for Sound album, "Drivin' All Night", was included as the album's opener.

T.R.A.S.H. has been described as the band's best album. A review from Billboard picked out the live version of Captain & Tennille's "Love Will Keep Us Together" as a highlight.

== Track listing ==
Side one
| No. | Title | Writer(s) | Original album | Length |
|---|---|---|---|---|
| 1. | "Drivin' All Night" | Bill Spooner; Roger Steen; Prairie Prince; Vince Welnick; Michael Cotten; Rick Anderson; Fee Waybill; Re Styles; Ken Kessie | Previously unreleased (Intended to be on the album Suffer for Sound) | 2:54 |
| 2. | "What Do You Want from Life?" | Spooner; Michael Evans | The Tubes (1975) | 4:00 |
| 3. | "Turn Me On" | Spooner; Steen; Prince; Welnick; Cotten; Anderson; Waybill | Remote Control (1979) | 4:11 |
| 4. | "Slipped My Disco" | Spooner; Steen | Young and Rich (1976) | 4:28 |
| 5. | "Don't Touch Me There" | Ron Nagle; Jane Dornacker | Young and Rich | 3:35 |
| 6. | "Mondo Bondage" (Live) | Spooner; Steen; Prince; Welnick; Cotten; Anderson; Waybill | What Do You Want from Live (1978) | 3:32 |

Side two
| No. | Title | Writer(s) | Original album | Length |
|---|---|---|---|---|
| 1. | "Love Will Keep Us Together" | Neil Sedaka; Howard Greenfield | Previously unreleased live recording from 1976 | 4:29 |
| 2. | "White Punks on Dope (W.P.O.D.)" (Parts A & B) | Evans; Spooner; Steen | Part A is a previously unreleased live country rock version from 1979; Part B is the promo single edit of the track from The Tubes | 5:15 |
| 3. | "Prime Time" | Spooner; Steen; Prince; Welnick; Cotten; Anderson; Waybill | Previously unreleased version of the song from Remote Control featuring Re Styles on solo lead vocals | 3:18 |
| 4. | "I'm Just a Mess" | Spooner; Steen | Now (1977) | 3:08 |
| 5. | "Only the Strong Survive" | Spooner; Steen; Prince; Welnick; Cotten; Anderson; Waybill | Remote Control | 3:56 |
