= What Do You Want from Live =

Live album by The Tubes
- Released: February 1978
- Recorded: November 1977
- Venues: Hammersmith Odeon, London
- Genres: Rock, experimental rock, progressive rock
- Length: 72:42
- Label: A&M
- Producers: Pete Henderson, Rikki Farr

The Tubes chronology
Now (1977)	What Do You Want from Live (1978)	Remote Control (1979)

Professional ratings
Review scores
Source	Rating
AllMusic	3/5 stars

What Do You Want from Live is the debut live album released by The Tubes, and was recorded at the Hammersmith Odeon, London.

== Background ==
The Tubes toured the UK at the height of the punk rock era in 1977. Despite their somewhat out-of-step musicality, the band's humorous and manic stage show found favor all over the country. The cabaret-like shows lasted over an hour, ending with lead singer Fee Waybill – in character as "Quay Lewd" (a play on the word "Quaalude"), a musical parody of a drug-addled rock star – getting crushed to death by a giant stack of (fake) speakers. NME pronounced the tour a great success, writing: "They came, they outraged, they conquered."

== Track listing ==
Side one
No.	Title	Writer(s)	Length
1.	"Overture"; 1. "Up from the Deep"; 2. "Young and Rich"; 3. "Madam I'm Adam"; 4. "Mondo Bondage"; 5. "Up from the Deep"; 6. "White Punks on Dope"	The Tubes; Ray Trainer	6:39; 2:00; 1:27; 0:49; 0:12; 1:00; 0:20
2.	"Got Yourself a Deal"	Bill Spooner; Fee Waybill	4:30
3.	"Show Me a Reason"	Roger Steen	3:28
4.	"What Do You Want from Life?"	Spooner; Michael Evans	5:12

Side two
No.	Title	Writer(s)	Length
1.	"God-Bird-Change"	Mingo Lewis	4:48
2.	"Special Ballet"	Michael Cotten	1:01
3.	"Don't Touch Me There"	Ron Nagle; Jane Dornacker	3:48
4.	"Mondo Bondage"	The Tubes	3:25
5.	"Smoke (La Vie en Fumér)"	Cotten; Vince Welnick; Spooner

Side three
No.	Title	Writer(s)	Length
1.	"Crime Medley"; 1. "Sound Effect – Siren"; 2. "Theme from Dragnet"; 3. "Theme from Peter Gunn"; 4. "Theme from Perry Mason"; 5. "Theme from The Untouchables"	Walter Schumann; Henry Mancini; Fred Steiner; Nelson Riddle	3:05; 0:08; 0:07; 0:34; 1:13; 1:03
2.	"I Was a Punk Before You Were a Punk"	Spooner; Evans; Waybill	4:02
3.	"I Saw Her Standing There"	John Lennon; Paul McCartney	2:57
4.	"Drum Solo"	Prairie Prince; Lewis	4:20

Side four
No.	Title	Writer(s)	Length
1.	"Boy Crazy"	Spooner	2:40
2.	"You're No Fun"	Welnick; Cotten; The Tubes	3:15
3.	"Stand Up and Shout"	Trainer; Mike Condello	3:30
4.	"White Punks on Dope"	Spooner; Steen; Evans	8:33

== Personnel ==
- Fee Waybill - vocals
- Bill Spooner - guitar, vocals
- Michael Cotten - synthesizer
- Mingo Lewis - drums, percussion
- Prairie Prince - drums
- Roger Steen - guitar
- Vince Welnick - keyboards
- Rick Anderson - bass
- Re Styles - vocals

== Critical reception ==
Although AllMusic reviews the album very favorably, describing it as "witty and entertaining" throughout, it ultimately gives it three stars out of five because the audio portion of the show is simply unable to convey the full impact of a Tubes concert in their heyday. "The downside of What Do You Want from Live", says reviewer Donald A. Guarisco, "is that some of the numbers are less potent without the choreographed routines surrounding them ... this leaves the listener feeling like they're only witnessing part of the joke", adding wistfully, "if only someone would put out a video of one of the Tubes' shows from this era."

== Charts ==
Chart (1978)	Position
Australia (Kent Music Report)	87
Canada (RPM)	75
UK Albums (Official Charts Company)	38
US Top LPs & Tape (Billboard)	82
