= Now (The Tubes album) =

Studio album by The Tubes
- Released: May 1977
- Recorded: Winter of 1976
- Studios: His Masters Wheels (San Francisco); Record Plant (Los Angeles); Record Plant (Sausalito); Funky Features (San Francisco)
- Genre: Rock
- Length: 42:09
- Label: A&M
- Producer: John Anthony

The Tubes chronology
Young and Rich (1976)	Now (1977)	What Do You Want from Live (1978)

CD Cover

Professional ratings
Review scores
Source	Rating
Allmusic	3/5 stars

Now is the third studio album released by The Tubes. It was produced by John Anthony. Fed up with constant meddling from Bud Scoppa and Don Wood under the direction of Bill Spooner including surreptitiously remixing a track when Anthony was not at the studio, Anthony was advised to leave the project by Jerry Moss. The head of A&M A&R Kip Cohen said that they took advantage of Anthony and believed that they overran the budget to increase their union fees. Bill Spooner took over and completed the project with the help of the engineer Wood and Scoppa.

Now includes a cover version of Captain Beefheart's "My Head Is My Only House Unless It Rains" and Captain Beefheart also played saxophone on "Cathy's Clone". The project was intended to be a double album but delays led to cutting several songs, including a version of Gene Pitney's "Town Without Pity" complete with horn arrangement by the Bay-area comedian/musician, Dick Bright. The cover of Now was drawn by The Tubes' drummer, Prairie Prince, entitled "Tubes Descending a Staircase", and was inspired by a similar drawing in Time magazine of the Ramones. In an A&M leaflet, they described the album as "This outrageous and zany band have developed musically and visually since their inception in San Francisco and their previous albums". Anthony believes in retrospect that he should not have tried to be "one of the boys" with this band but remains proud of his idea to have the band playing again live in the studio liked they used to do in the Bay Area bars.

== 2012 reissue ==
Real Gone Records reissued Now with Young and Rich, the band's second album, as a 2-CD set. The liner notes included comments from the drummer Prairie Prince. Unlike the reissues from Iconclassic, this reissue had no bonus tracks.

== Track listing ==
Side one
No.	Title	Writer(s)	Length
1.	"Smoke (La Vie en Fumér)"	Michael Cotten; Vince Welnick; Bill Spooner	4:50
2.	"Hit Parade"	Spooner; Welnick	3:35
3.	"Strung Out on Strings"	Spooner; Roger Steen; Michael Evans	4:10
4.	"Golden Boy"	Spooner; Evans	4:00
5.	"My Head is My Only House Unless it Rains"	Don Van Vliet	4:30

Side two
No.	Title	Writer(s)	Length
1.	"God-Bird-Change"	Mingo Lewis	3:18
2.	"I'm Just a Mess"	Steen; Spooner	3:10
3.	"Cathy's Clone"	Jane Dornacker	3:30
4.	"This Town"	Lee Hazlewood	3:15
5.	"Pound of Flesh"	Ron Nagle; Scott Matthews	3:00
6.	"You're No Fun"	Welnick; Cotten; The Tubes	4:51

== Personnel ==
- Fee Waybill – vocals
- Bill "The Swami" Spooner – guitar, vocals
- Michael Cotten – synthesizer
- Mingo Lewis – drums, percussion
- Prairie Prince – drums
- Roger Steen – guitar, vocals
- Re Styles – vocals
- Vince Welnick – keyboards
- Rick Anderson – bass guitar

Additional personnel

- Bud Scoppa – voices
- Don Van Vliet – soprano saxophone on "Cathy's Clone" (uncredited)
- Harry Duncan – harmonica on "Golden Boy" (uncredited)
- Roberta Burger – violin

Technical

- Don Wood – engineer, production assistance
- Roland Young – art direction
- Michael Cotten, Prairie Prince – design

"Special thanks to: Captain Beefheart, Bernie Krause, Rick Bright and his Sounds of Delight Orchestra, Rob Lawrence and Harry Duncan"
