= Remote Control (The Tubes album) =

Studio album by the Tubes
- Released: March 1979
- Recorded: Music Annex, Menlo Park, California
- Genres: Rock, new wave
- Length: 41:44
- Label: A&M
- Producer: Todd Rundgren

The Tubes chronology
What Do You Want from Live (1978)	Remote Control (1979)	T.R.A.S.H. (Tubes Rarities and Smash Hits) (1981)

Remote Control is the fourth studio album released by the Tubes. This was their first to be produced by Todd Rundgren (the other being 1985's Love Bomb). It is a concept album about a television-addicted idiot savant.

== Background ==
Producer Todd Rundgren suggested to the band that their next work be a concept album. Lead singer Fee Waybill sketched out a storyline based on his favorite book, Being There by Jerzy Kosinski. "It wasn't an original concept," he admits, but "I tried to make it more contemporary." Rundgren encouraged the musical adaptation, and thrust himself into the project, as was his style: "Every song has so much of him," marveled Prairie Prince.

There are two versions of the song "Prime Time". Rundgren initially recorded it with Re Styles as the lead vocalist, but at the behest of Fee Waybill, edited it into a duet featuring both Styles and Waybill. The latter version, which also has slightly rearranged choruses, is what appeared on the original album and single, while the original version with just Styles debuted on the compilation album T.R.A.S.H. (Tubes Rarities and Smash Hits), in 1981.

== Packaging ==
The cover of Remote Control depicts a baby watching the popular game show Hollywood Squares in a specially made "Vidi-Trainer". The back cover is the show's game board with eight members of the Tubes each sitting in different squares. The lower right corner square remained unoccupied with the band's name on the front; the eight members crammed into this same square for a photo that was later used for the compact disc release of this album. (Three members of the band – Waybill, Spooner and Steen – appeared as panelists on the actual game show in the late 70s.)

== Reception ==
Professional ratings
Review scores
Source	Rating
AllMusic	4/5 stars
Christgau's Record Guide	C+
Smash Hits	8/10

Although Rolling Stone panned the album upon its release in 1979, calling it "drearily obvious and stale", two years later the same magazine loved it, limiting its praise of the subsequent album, The Completion Backward Principle, by saying, good as it was, "topping Remote Control will be difficult." AllMusic gives it four out of five stars. Crawdaddy called it "a pop/rock masterpiece." The Globe and Mail determined that "the Tubes are to rock music what Second City are to television – sure-handed satirists who take every opportunity to rip huge chunks of flesh from the hand of society that feeds them... Their music never falls short of the outrageous and devilishly clever."

Smash Hits said the album was, "clever and attractive, good songs and production, and enough energy to shrivel any heavy metal band.""

The track Prime Time made No. 34 in the UK singles chart.

== Track listing ==
All songs written by Bill Spooner, Roger Steen, Prairie Prince, Vince Welnick, Michael Cotten, Rick Anderson, and Fee Waybill. (Note: Some versions of the original LP also credit Re Styles on all tracks.)

Side one
No.	Title	Additional writer(s)	Length
1.	"Turn Me On"		4:10
2.	"T.V. is King"	Todd Rundgren	3:08
3.	"Prime Time"		3:15
4.	"I Want It All Now"		4:27
5.	"No Way Out"		3:22

Side two
No.	Title	Additional writer(s)	Length
1.	"Getoverture"		3:23
2.	"No Mercy"		3:27
3.	"Only the Strong Survive"		3:54
4.	"Be Mine Tonight"		3:30
5.	"Love's a Mystery (I Don't Understand)"	Rundgren	3:27
6.	"Telecide"		5:41

=== 2013 CD reissue ===
In April 2013, Iconoclassic reissued Remote Control in full with bonus tracks, and an expansive booklet including comments from Fee Waybill, Michael Cotten and Bill Spooner. The reissue was mastered by Vic Anesini from the original master tapes and featured four tracks from the unreleased Suffer for Sound album. These tracks were self-produced as the follow-up to Remote Control and the finished album was rejected by A&M which released a compilation featuring only one track from Suffer for Sound instead.

No.	Title	Writer(s)	Length
12.	"Dreams Come True"	Spooner; Waybill; Welnick	3:45
13.	"Dangerous"	Steen	3:33
14.	"Don't Ask Me"	Spooner; Steen	3:47
15.	"Holy War"	Spooner; Steen; Prince; Welnick; Cotten; Anderson; Waybill	3:52

== Personnel ==
- Fee Waybill – vocals
- Bill Spooner – guitar, vocals
- Michael Cotten – synthesizer
- Mingo Lewis – percussion
- Prairie Prince – drums
- Roger Steen – guitar, vocals
- Re Styles – vocals
- Vince Welnick – keyboards
- Rick Anderson – bass

Additional personnel:

- Todd Rundgren – producer, guitar, keyboards
- Lenny Pickett – saxophone solo on “No Mercy”

== Charts ==
Chart (1979)	Position
Australia (Kent Music Report)	70
Canada (RPM)	53
UK Albums (OCC)	40
US Top LPs & Tape (Billboard)	46
