= Wild in London =

Wild In London

Live album by The Tubes
- Released: August 2, 2005
- Recorded: December 2004
- Venue: Shepherd's Bush Empire (London)
- Genre: Rock
- Label: Secret
- Producer: Roger Lomas

The Tubes chronology
Genius of America (1996)	Wild In London (2005)

Professional ratings
Review scores
Source	Rating
AllMusic	3.5/5 stars

Wild In London is the third live album by The Tubes which was released in 2005. It was recorded on December 6, 2004 at Londons' Shepherd's Bush Empire and features some newer Fee Waybill characters such as "Russell Chaps". The CD featured a guest appearance by Beki Bondage, who dueted with Fee Waybill on "Don't Touch Me There"

There was an accompanying DVD called The Tubes Wild West Show, which has many more tracks than the CD release.

== Track listing ==
1. "Overture" – 2:32
2. "She's A Beauty" (Foster, Lukather, Waybill) – 5:47
3. "Don't Touch Me There" (Doornacker) – 5:29
4. "Malaguena Salarosa" (Galindo, Ramirez) – 4:17
5. "Russell Chaps Intro" – 1:33
6. "Tip Of My Tongue" (Foster, Lukather, The Tubes) – 5:37
7. "Don't Want to Wait Anymore" (Foster, The Tubes) – 7:05
8. "TV Is King" (Cotten, Prince, Spooner, Steen, Waybill, Welnick) – 3:10
9. "No Way Out" (Prince, Spooner, Steen) – 3:51
10. "Let There Be Drums" (Anderson, Cotten, Prince, Spooner, Steen, Waybill, Welnick) – 3:50
11. "White Punks on Dope" (Evans, Spooner, Steen) – 8:37
12. "Mondo Bondage" (Anderson, Cotten, Prince, Spooner, Steen, Waybill, Welnick) – 5:46
13. "Haloes" (Kooper, Spooner, Steen) – 5:30
14. "Talk to Ya Later" (Foster, Lukather, The Tubes) – 10:06

== Personnel ==
Musicians

- Fee Waybill – vocals
- Gary Cambra – guitar, keyboards, vocals
- David Medd – keyboards, vocals
- Roger Steen – guitar, vocals
- Prairie Prince – drums
- Rick Anderson – bass guitar
- Beki Bondage – vocals

Production

- Roger Lomas – engineer, mixing, producer
- Richard Evatt – assistant engineer
- Tim Jones – liner notes
