= Xanadu (film) =

1980 film by Robert Greenwald

- Theatrical release poster
- Directed by: Robert Greenwald
- Written by: Richard Christian Danus; Marc Reid Rubel
- Produced by: Lawrence Gordon
- Starring: Olivia Newton-John; Gene Kelly; Michael Beck
- Cinematography: Victor J. Kemper
- Edited by: Dennis Virkler
- Music by: Barry De Vorzon; Electric Light Orchestra
- Distributed by: Universal Pictures
- Release date: August 8, 1980
- Running time: 96 minutes
- Country: United States
- Language: English
- Budget: $20 million
- Box office: $23 million

Xanadu is a 1980 American musical fantasy film written by Richard Christian Danus and Marc Reid Rubel and directed by Robert Greenwald. Starring Olivia Newton-John along with Michael Beck and Gene Kelly in his final film role, the film features music by Newton-John, Electric Light Orchestra, Cliff Richard and the Tubes. The title refers to the nightclub in the film, which takes its name from Xanadu, the summer capital of Kublai Khan's Yuan dynasty in China. The city itself appears in the 1816 poem Kubla Khan by Samuel Taylor Coleridge, which is quoted by Newton-John's character in the film.

Released in the United States on August 8, 1980, by Universal Pictures, the film was a critical and box-office disappointment, and (along with Can't Stop the Music) inspired the creation of the Golden Raspberry Awards to recognize the worst films of the year. Despite this, the soundtrack album became commercially successful worldwide and was certified double platinum in the United States. The song "Magic" was a US chart-topper for Newton-John, and the title track (performed by Newton-John and Electric Light Orchestra) reached number one in the United Kingdom and several other countries. The film has since become a cult classic for its mixture of 1980s music and culture, creative choreography, and special effects that were innovative for the time.

== Plot ==
Sonny Malone, a struggling self-employed illustrator residing in Los Angeles, has failed to find passion in his art. He tears up one of his sketches and tosses the pieces out his studio window; the wind transports them toward a wall mural of nine dancing sisters that suddenly comes alive when the scraps touch the mural. The sisters fly across Earth, but one returns to roller skate through town, then deliberately slows upon encountering Sonny. She momentarily pauses to kiss him before skating away, confounding him.

Meekly returning to his old job of painting album-cover reproductions at AirFlo Records, Sonny is tasked by his tyrannical boss Simpson with painting a reproduction for a group called the 9 Sisters. The cover shows the mysterious woman whom Sonny had met in front of an abandoned Art Deco-style auditorium. The photographer tells Sonny that the woman was not supposed to be on the cover but suddenly appeared in a few of his shots. Returning to where he first encountered her, he instead encounters Danny McGuire, a former big-band clarinet player and later orchestra leader turned construction mogul. During Sonny and Danny's conversation, the woman appears in person, causing Sonny to track her across town to the same auditorium, where she introduces herself as Kira but refuses to tell him anything more about herself.

Sonny and Danny befriend each other, with Danny detailing his romantic involvement in the 1940s with a singer who resembled Kira; her departure resulted in his own loss of creative passion. Kira encourages the duo to open a nightclub at the auditorium called Xanadu, and the two begin working together as partners. Sonny and Kira also gradually fall in love, culminating in a magically animated sequence. On the night before the club's opening, Kira confesses to Sonny that she is actually Terpsichore, one of the Nine Muses of Olympus. She was sent to inspire the creation of Xanadu, but she cannot stay despite their mutual feelings, as she is forbidden from falling in love with mortals. Sonny becomes upset at the revelation, and Kira departs Earth having fulfilled her duty.

Danny tells Sonny to keep pursuing Kira, encouraging him not to abandon his dreams as Danny had done after his own muse left him. Sonny manages to enter Kira's home by roller skating into the Muses' mural. Inside the realm of the gods on Mount Helicon, Sonny pleads with Kira's father Zeus to allow Kira to return to Earth, and Kira's sympathetic mother Mnemosyne attempts to influence Zeus. However, Zeus sends Sonny back to Earth. Kira then professes her feelings for Sonny, and Zeus ultimately relents, allowing her to be with Sonny for "maybe just one moment, or forever". Kira and the Muses perform at the grand opening of the Xanadu club before returning to their realm. Sonny is initially saddened by their departure, but after Danny orders a cocktail for him, he sees that the waitress who serves him resembles Kira, and begins a conversation with her.

== Cast ==
- Olivia Newton-John as Kira (Terpsichore)
- Gene Kelly as Danny McGuire
  - Matt Lattanzi as young Danny McGuire
- Michael Beck as Sonny Malone
- James Sloyan as Simpson
- Dimitra Arliss as Helen
- Katie Hanley as Sandra
- Fred McCarren as Richie
- Ren Woods as Jo
- Melvin Jones as Big Al
- Ira Newborn as 1940s band leader
- Jo Ann Harris as 1940s singer
- Wilfrid Hyde-White as heavenly voice #1 (Zeus)
- Coral Browne as heavenly voice #2 (Mnemosyne)
- Miranda Garrison, Matt Lattanzi, Adolfo Quinones, Re Styles and Darcel Wynne as Xanadu dancers

The Muses

- Sandahl Bergman
- Lynn Latham
- Melinda Phelps
- Cherise Bate
- Juliette Marshall
- Marilyn Tokuda
- Yvette Van Voorhees
- Teri Beckerman

Members of the Tubes

- Rick Anderson
- Michael Cotten
- Prairie Prince
- Bill Spooner
- Roger Steen
- Fee Waybill
- Vince Welnick

== Production ==
Pan-Pacific Auditorium transformed into "Xanadu" via special effects

Originally conceived as a relatively low-budget roller-disco picture, a number of prominent performers joined the production, which evolved into a much larger project. However, roller skating was retained as a recurring theme, especially in the final scenes of the club's opening night. Earlier versions of the story established that Sonny Malone (Michael Beck) was the artist who created the mural from which the nine goddess sisters emerge. This provided a much stronger explanation for the Muses' interest in helping him achieve artistic success. However, continual rewrites and editing during production caused this plot point to be abandoned, except for one line spoken by Sonny as he laments his failure as a freelance artist: "I paint his van... I paint somebody else's mural..." This element of the plot was recycled and used in the later stage adaptation. The Marvel Comics adaptation published as Marvel Super Special #17 retained the more strongly emphasized connection between Sonny and the painting.

The plot of the 1947 film Down to Earth was used as the basis for Xanadu. In that film, Rita Hayworth plays Terpsichore, with Larry Parks as stage producer Danny Miller. Gene Kelly's character, Danny McGuire, previously appeared in Cover Girl (1944). Kelly retired from acting after the film's release and died in 1996.

Kenny Ortega and Jerry Trent served as choreographers. The Pan-Pacific Auditorium in Los Angeles was used for exterior shots of the nightclub. Sonny refers to the venue as "a dump" and the real Pan-Pacific Auditorium had fallen into disrepair. Danny remarks that "they used to have wrestling here," which was indeed true of the Pan-Pacific. The building was destroyed by fire a decade later. Xanadu's nightclub interior was built on Stage 4 of the Hollywood Center Studios beginning in 1979. Olivia Newton-John recalled problems with the script and the many story changes that occurred during filming.

== Soundtrack ==
The soundtrack album reached number two on the UK Albums Chart and number four on the US Billboard 200. It has been certified double platinum in the US and gold in the UK. It contained five top-20 singles:

- "Magic" – Olivia Newton-John: No. 1 Billboard Hot 100 (four weeks), No. 1 adult contemporary (five weeks), certified gold
- "Xanadu" – Olivia Newton-John/Electric Light Orchestra: No. 8 Hot 100 (one week), No. 2 adult contemporary (one week), No. 1 UK singles chart (two weeks)
- "All Over the World" – Electric Light Orchestra: No. 13 pop (one week), No. 45 adult contemporary (one week)
- "I'm Alive" – Electric Light Orchestra: No. 16 pop (one week), No. 48 adult contemporary (one week), certified gold
- "Suddenly" – Olivia Newton-John/Cliff Richard: No. 20 pop (one week), No. 4 adult contemporary (one week)

=== Musical numbers ===
The album grouped Olivia Newton-John's and ELO's songs on separate sides of the soundtrack album, and some songs heard in the film were excluded from the album. The following is the actual order in the film:

- Instrumental medley of "Whenever You're Away from Me" and "Xanadu", over first part of opening credits
- "Whenever You're Away from Me" (excerpt) as Danny plays the clarinet on the beach at the break of dawn
- Instrumental underscoring of "Xanadu" with Sonny drawing and painting
- Extended intro to "I'm Alive"
- "I'm Alive" (ELO) as the Muses from the wall mural come to life
- "Whenever You're Away from Me" (excerpt) with Danny again playing the clarinet at the beach
- "Magic" (Newton-John) as Kira and Sonny have their first conversation while Kira is roller skating in the dark auditorium
- "You Made Me Love You" (Newton-John) as played on the Glenn Miller record played by Danny in the ballroom of his home
- "Whenever You're Away from Me" (Gene Kelly and Newton-John) Danny and Kira singing and dancing in the ballroom. This song was heavily influenced by Frank Sinatra. This was the last sequence filmed.
- "Suddenly" (Newton-John duet with Cliff Richard) Kira and Sonny dance and roller skate in the recording studio
- "Dancin'" (Newton-John duet with the Tubes) in the auditorium as Danny and Sonny imagine differing visions of their ideal club. Sonny's rock band and Danny's big-band female trio merge into a unified whole, leading to agreement on Xanadu as the name of the club
- "Don't Walk Away" (ELO) during a romantic animated sequence featuring Sonny and Kira shapeshifting into fish and birds (animation by Don Bluth)
- "All Over the World" (ELO) in the "franchised glitz dealer" store (the Beverly Hills Fiorucci store), Danny runs through dance steps and models various outfits
- "The Fall" (ELO) as Sonny finds the Muses wall mural and roller skates through its portal entrance into Xanadu to find Kira
- "Suspended in Time" (Newton-John) after Zeus (Wilfrid Hyde-White) sends Sonny home and a dejected Kira sings about her love for Sonny
- "Drum Dreams" (ELO) begins the Xanadu opening-night sequence, with Danny leading the group on skates
- "Xanadu" (Newton-John and ELO) as Kira sings and is reunited with Sonny
- "Fool Country" (Newton-John) as Kira sings and dances in various costumes with the other eight Muses
- "Xanadu" reprise as Kira sings and dances with the other Muses
- "Magic" (Newton-John) reprise as Sonny stares at the empty revolving dance floor, now disillusioned that Kira is gone
- Instrumental riff from "Xanadu" as the film ends with Kira (as a Xanadu waitress) talking to Sonny
- "Xanadu" (Newton-John and ELO) short version over closing credits

== Home media ==
Xanadu was released on DVD on June 24, 2008. The Magical Music Edition features a "Going Back to Xanadu" featurette, the film's trailer and a photo gallery. A bonus music CD with the original soundtrack album was included, with no extra tracks.

The film was released on Blu-ray on March 8, 2016. It has also been released in digital high-definition format for download and streaming.

== Reception ==
=== Box office ===
The film underperformed at the box office; it grossed only $23 million against a reported $20 million budget, a total that was insufficient to offset all related costs and return a profit.

=== Critical response ===
Universal canceled press screenings, suggesting that the studio was not confident in the film. Variety called it "a stupendously bad film whose only salvage is the music." Roger Ebert awarded the film two stars out of four, describing the film as "a mushy and limp musical fantasy" with a confused story, redeemed only by Newton-John's "high spirits" and several strong scenes with Kelly. Ebert criticized the choreography, saying that "the dance numbers in this movie do not seem to have been conceived for film." He noted that large dance scenes were not photographed well by cinematographer Victor J. Kemper, who shot at eye level and failed to capture the larger patterns of dancers, with dancers in the background muddying the movement of the foreground.

On the review aggregator website Rotten Tomatoes, 33% of 46 critics' reviews are positive. The website's consensus reads: "Not even spandex and over-the-top musical numbers can save Xanadu from questionable acting, unimpressive effects, and a story unencumbered by logic." Metacritic, which uses a weighted average, assigned the film a score of 31 out of 100, based on 13 critics, indicating "generally unfavorable" reviews. The German television show Die schlechtesten Filme aller Zeiten (English: The Worst Movies of All Time) featured the film in its third season. Janet Maslin wrote in her review: "Like The Wiz... Xanadu is desperately stylish without having any real style."

A double feature with Xanadu and another musical released several months earlier, Can't Stop the Music, inspired John J.B. Wilson to create the Golden Raspberry Awards (or Razzies), an annual event recognizing the worst in cinema for a given year. Robert Greenwald won the first Golden Raspberry Award for Worst Director, and the film was nominated for six other awards at the 1st Golden Raspberry Awards.

=== Accolades ===
Award	Category	Nominee(s)	Result	Ref.
Golden Raspberry Awards (1980)	Worst Picture	Lawrence Gordon	Nominated	
Golden Raspberry Awards (1980)	Worst Director	Robert Greenwald	Won	
Golden Raspberry Awards (1980)	Worst Actor	Michael Beck	Nominated	
Golden Raspberry Awards (1980)	Worst Actress	Olivia Newton-John	Nominated	
Golden Raspberry Awards (1980)	Worst Screenplay	Richard Christian Danus and Marc Reid Rubel	Nominated	
Golden Raspberry Awards (1980)	Worst Original Song	"Suspended in Time"; Music and Lyrics by John Farrar	Nominated	
Golden Raspberry Awards (2005)	Worst "Musical" of Our First 25 Years		Nominated	
Grammy Awards	Best Pop Vocal Performance, Female	"Magic" – Olivia Newton-John	Nominated	
Ivor Novello Awards	Best Film Song, Theme or Score	Jeff Lynne	Won	
Jupiter Awards	Best International Actress	Olivia Newton-John	Nominated	
Stinkers Bad Movie Awards	Worst Picture		Dishonorable Mention	
Stinkers Bad Movie Awards	Least "Special" Special Effects		Nominated	
Young Artist Awards	Best Major Motion Picture – Family Entertainment		Nominated	
Young Artist Awards	Best Family Music Album	Xanadu	Nominated	

== Legacy ==
=== Cult following ===
Over the years, the film has developed a cult audience.

Douglas Carter Beane, who wrote the book for the musical based on the film, later called Xanadu "what happens when you let straight men near the musical... I blame cocaine. It's like people say, 'When you hear Ray Charles play, you can hear the heroin?' When you watch Xanadu, you can see the cocaine up on the screen."

In 2000, an unauthorized stage show titled Xanadu Live! was performed in Los Angeles, with actors speaking the film's dialogue and miming the songs.

=== Stage musical ===
A $5 million Broadway musical adaptation of the same name began previews on May 23, 2007, and opened (with Newton-John and songwriter John Farrar in attendance) on July 10, 2007, starring Kerry Butler as Kira, Cheyenne Jackson as Sonny, and Tony Roberts as Danny. In the musical, Kira is the Muse Clio, not Terpsichore. Jackie Hoffman and Mary Testa co-starred (in a plot twist new to the Broadway version) as evil Muse sisters Calliope and Malpomene. The show, which humorously parodied the plot of the film, was a surprise hit, receiving praise for its satirical approach, and was nominated for several Tony Awards at the 62nd Tony Awards.

The original cast recording was released in December 2007. The Broadway production closed on September 28, 2008, after 49 previews and 512 performances, and a successful national tour followed.

== See also ==
- List of cult films
- Muses in popular culture
