= The Tubes (album) =

Studio album by the Tubes
- Released: June 1975
- Recorded: March–April 1975
- Studio: Record Plant (Los Angeles)
- Genre: Rock, art rock, glam rock
- Length: 38:15
- Label: A&M
- Producer: Al Kooper

The Tubes chronology
The Tubes (1975)	Young and Rich (1976)

Professional ratings
Review scores
Source	Rating
AllMusic	3.5/5 stars
Christgau's Record Guide	B−

The Tubes is the first album by the Tubes. Songs which received significant airplay from this album include "What Do You Want from Life?" and "White Punks on Dope", the latter of which peaked at number 28 on the UK singles chart. The album was dedicated to Bob McIntosh and Tom Donahue, the former of whom had originally played with the band until his death in 1973.

Re Styles, who models on the front and back covers of the record sleeve, would join the band as a vocalist for the following three studio albums.

== Track listing ==
Song timings and credits taken from original LP.

Side One
No.	Title	Writer(s)	Length
1.	"Up from the Deep"	The Tubes, Ray Trainer	4:30
2.	"Haloes"	Al Kooper, Bill Spooner, Roger Steen	4:55
3.	"Space Baby"	Mike Carpenter, Spooner, Vince Welnick	4:26
4.	"Malagueña Salerosa"	Pedro Galindo, Elpidio Ramirez	4:51

Side Two
No.	Title	Writer(s)	Length
5.	"Mondo Bondage"	The Tubes	4:34
6.	"What Do You Want from Life"	Michael Evans, Spooner	4:02
7.	"Boy Crazy"	Spooner	4:12
8.	"White Punks on Dope"	Evans, Spooner, Steen	6:45
Total length:			38:15

== Personnel ==
The Tubes

- Fee Waybill – lead vocals
- Bill Spooner – guitar, lead vocals
- Roger Steen – guitar, vocals
- Michael Cotten – synthesizer
- Vince Welnick – keyboards
- Rick Anderson – bass
- Prairie L'Emprere Prince – drums

Additional

- Dominic Frontiere – string and horn arrangements
- Lee Rhett Kiefer – engineer, mixing
- Al Kooper – mixing
- Roland Young – art direction
- Michael Cotten – design
- Prairie Prince – design
- Ian Patrick – photography
- Harry Mittman – photography
- Re Styles – modeling (hands on front cover and body on back cover)

== Cover versions ==
- Mötley Crüe covered "White Punks on Dope" on their album New Tattoo, and performed it live in concert on their "Lewd, Crüed, & Tattooed" DVD. The Nina Hagen Band interpreted the song in a German-language version, translated to "TV-Glotzer" (with re-written lyrics about being an East German who lives vicariously by staring at West German television all day) on their self-titled debut album in 1978. In the 1993 film Fear of a Black Hat, the band N.W.H. (with Ric Ocasek of the Cars) perform a parody of "White Punks on Dope", titled "White Cops on Dope".
