= Outside Inside (The Tubes album) =

Studio album by the Tubes
- Released: April 4, 1983
- Recorded: 1982
- Studios: The Automatt (San Francisco); Capitol Studios (Hollywood); The Complex (Los Angeles); Davlen Sound Studios (North Hollywood); Different Fur Recording (San Francisco); Lion Share Studios (Hollywood); The Manor (Los Angeles); Record One (Sherman Oaks); Russian Hill Recording (San Francisco); Tubesound (San Francisco)
- Genre: Rock
- Length: 36:44
- Label: Capitol
- Producer: David Foster

The Tubes chronology
The Completion Backward Principle (1981)	Outside Inside (1983)	Love Bomb (1985)

Professional ratings
Review scores
Source	Rating
AllMusic	4/5 stars
The Village Voice	(C+)

Outside Inside is the sixth studio album by the Tubes, released on April 4, 1983, via Capitol Records. The album peaked at No. 18 on the US Billboard 200.

== Release history ==
The Michele Gray version of "The Monkey Time" was also used on the Capitol CD issue of the album.

The album's liner notes list the track "Outside Lookin' Inside" as being "excerpted from a conversation with Harry James."

In 2012 Iconoclassic reissued the album with the original version of "The Monkey Time" featuring Davis. The reissue also included bonus tracks including B-sides that had never been previously released on CD. The CD was remastered by Vic Anesini and featured extensive liner notes and commentary from band members.

The bonus tracks include:

1. "When You're Ready to Come" (B-side of a single from the album)
2. "Keyboard Kids"
3. "Satellite" (an alternate version previously appeared on Bill Spooner's 1985 solo album "First Chud")
4. "The Monkey Time" (single version featuring Michele Gray on vocals)

== Critical reception ==
Dave Connolly of AllMusic favourably claimed "producer David Foster and even more members of Toto help the Tubes punch up their new radio-ready sound with added energy. If their last record showed a newfound dancefloor sensibility, Outside Inside is absolutely funky."

== Track listing ==
All tracks are written by The Tubes, except where noted.

Side one
No.	Title	Writer(s)	Length
1.	"She's a Beauty"	Fee Waybill; David Foster; Steve Lukather	4:01
2.	"No Not Again"		3:28
3.	"Out of the Business"		3:30
4.	"The Monkey Time"	Curtis Mayfield	3:54
5.	"Glass House"		3:31

Side two
No.	Title	Writer(s)	Length
6.	"Wild Women of Wongo"		3:57
7.	"Tip of My Tongue"	The Tubes; Michael Snyder; Maurice White	3:58
8.	"Fantastic Delusion"		3:54
9.	"Drums"		2:21
10.	"Theme Park"		3:13
11.	"Outside Lookin' Inside"		0:57
Total length:			36:44

== Personnel ==
Adapted from the album liner notes.

=== The Tubes ===
- Fee Waybill – vocals
- Bill Spooner – guitar, vocals
- Michael Cotten – synthesizer
- Prairie Prince – drums
- Roger Steen – guitar, vocals
- Vince Welnick – keyboards
- Rick Anderson – bass

=== Additional personnel ===
- Martha Davis – vocals (4)
- Maurice White – vocals (7)
- Patti Austin – background vocals
- Bill Champlin – background vocals
- Bobby Kimball – background vocals
- Nathan East – bass
- David Foster – keyboards
- James Newton Howard – keyboards
- Mingo Lewis – percussion
- Steve Lukather – guitar
- David Paich – keyboards
- Steve Porcaro – keyboards
- Freddy Washington – bass
- David Williams – guitar
- Chuck Findley – trumpet
- Gary Grant – trumpet
- Gary Herbig – saxophone
- Jerry Hey – trumpet, horn arrangements
- Bill Reichenbach Jr. – trombone
- Larry Williams – saxophone

=== Technical ===
- Produced by David Foster
- Co-produced by Prairie Prince, Stacy Baird, Michael Cotten
- Mixed by Humberto Gatica (1, 2, 4, 8–10), Greg Ladanyi (3), George Massenburg (5–7), Fee Waybill
- Engineered by Humberto Gatica, Dennis Kirk, Greg Ladanyi
- Additional engineers – Stacy Baird, Jeff Bergeson, David Cole, Ken Kessie, Jack Leahy
- Assistant engineers – Niko Bolas, Bob Bullock, Larry Fergusson, Tom Fouce, Howard Johnston, Jeff Kliment, Marnie Moore, Barbra Rooney, Steve Schmitt, Roberto Spano, Wayne Tanouye, Gene Wooley
- Creative direction – Bill Burks
- Art direction – Prairie Prince, Roy Kohara
- Photography – Jim McCrary

== Charts ==
Chart	Position	Date
US Billboard 200	18	July 1983
UK Top Pop Albums	77	April 1983
NZ Top Pop Albums	22	June 1983
Canada (RPM)	27	June 1983

Singles – US Billboard
Year	Single	Chart	Position
1983	"She's a Beauty"	Mainstream Rock	1
1983	"She's a Beauty"	Pop Singles	10
1983	"Tip of My Tongue"	Pop Singles	52
1983	"The Monkey Time"	Mainstream Rock	16
1983	"The Monkey Time"	Pop Singles	68
