= Young and Rich =

Studio album by The Tubes
- Released: April 1976
- Studio: A&M (Hollywood)
- Genre: Glam rock
- Length: 38:08
- Label: A&M
- Producer: Ken Scott

The Tubes chronology
The Tubes (1975)	Young and Rich (1976)	Now (1977)

Professional ratings
Review scores
Source	Rating
AllMusic	2.5/5 stars
Christgau's Record Guide	B−

Young and Rich is the second studio album by The Tubes, released in 1976. It reached #46 on the Billboard 200.

The album is no longer available on CD, although all of its songs can be found on "White Punks on Dope".

== Track listing ==
Side one
No.	Title	Writer(s)	Length
1.	"Tubes World Tour"	Bill Spooner; Roger Steen; Fee Waybill	4:43
2.	"Brighter Day"	Steen	3:39
3.	"Pimp"	Spooner	4:27
4.	"Stand Up and Shout"	Ray Trainer; Mike Condello	2:37
5.	"Don't Touch Me There"	Ron Nagle; Jane Dornacker	3:30

Side two
No.	Title	Writer(s)	Length
1.	"Slipped My Disco"	Spooner; Steen	4:27
2.	"Proud to Be an American"	Spooner	2:58
3.	"Poland Whole / Madam I'm Adam"	Steen /: Spooner; The Tubes	6:30
4.	"Young and Rich"	Spooner	5:07

== Personnel ==
Credits taken from original LP liner notes.

- Bill "Sputnik" Spooner – guitars, vocals (lead vocals on "Pimp," "Slipped My Disco," and "Young and Rich"), "below-console leadership"
- Fee Waybill – "method frontman," vocals (lead vocals on "Tubes World Tour," "Stand Up and Shout," "Don't Touch Me There," "Proud to Be an American", and "Poland Whole/Madam, I'm Adam")
- Michael Cotten – synthesizers, "vision"
- "Preposterous" Prairie Prince – "power percussion"
- Vince Welnick – keyboards, synthesizer, "gestures"
- Rick "Gator" Anderson – bass, "vocal quips"
- Roger Steen – guitars (all on "Brighter Day"), blues harp, vocals (lead vocals on "Brighter Day"), "bone structure"
- Re Styles – "funky-pretty" vocals (lead vocals on "Don't Touch Me There"), "good hands again"

with:

- David Paich, Jack Nitzsche – arrangements
- Chuck Domanico – string bass (on "Proud to Be an American")
- Don Randi – piano
- Alan Estes, Julius Wechter – percussion
- Jay Migliori – saxophone
- Steve Douglas – saxophone, tambourine
- Bobby Shew – trumpet
- George Bohanon – trombone
- Deniece Williams, Gene Morford, Jerry Whitman, Julia Tillman Waters, Maxine Williard Waters, Ron Hicklin, Stan Farber – backing vocals
- Allan Harshman, Assa Drori, Harry Bluestone, Herschel Wise, James Getzoff, Jesse Ehrlich, Leonard Malarsky, Lou Klass, Marshall Sosson, Marvin Limonick, Murray Adler, Nathan Ross, Ray Kelley, Samuel Boghossian, Virginia Majewski, William Kurasch – strings
- Armand Kaproff, David Speltz – cello

Technical

- Ed Thacker – engineer
- Michael Cotten, Prairie Prince – album design
- Harry Mittman, Norman Seeff – photography

== Covers ==
- Lizzy Borden covered "Don't Touch Me There" on their Terror Rising EP.

== Charts ==
Chart (1976)	Position
Australia (Kent Music Report)	55
Canada (RPM)	75
United States (Billboard 200)	46
