= Love Bomb (The Tubes album) =

Studio album by the Tubes
- Released: February 1985
- Recorded: 1984
- Studios: The Sound Hole (San Francisco); Fantasy Studios (Berkeley)
- Genre: Rock
- Label: Capitol
- Producer: Todd Rundgren

The Tubes chronology
Outside Inside (1983)	Love Bomb (1985)	Genius of America (1996)

Professional ratings
Review scores
Source	Rating
AllMusic	1.5/5 stars

Love Bomb is the seventh studio album by the Tubes, and their second to be produced by Todd Rundgren. It was released in 1985 on Capitol Records. It is the last major-label release by the Tubes.

Following the release of Love Bomb, the band broke up, with keyboardist Vince Welnick joining Rundgren's touring band, and eventually also drummer Prairie Prince. Rundgren would also record his own version of "Feel It" for his 1989 album Nearly Human, which also featured the two musicians.

The track, "Piece by Piece" was a minor hit single, peaking at No. 87 on the USA Billboard Hot 100 chart. A music video incorporating computer and stop motion animation was also made for the track.

== Track listing ==
Credits adapted from the original LP.

All tracks are written by The Tubes, except where noted.

Side one
No.	Title	Writer(s)	Length
1.	"Piece by Piece"	The Tubes; Todd Rundgren; Tom Snow	4:24
2.	"Stella"	The Tubes; Sterling Crew	4:07
3.	"Come as You Are"	The Tubes; Rundgren; Lorie Welnick	3:38
4.	"One Good Reason"	The Tubes; Rundgren; L. Welnick	4:04
5.	"Bora Bora 2000/Love Bomb"	The Tubes; King Tao Tu	4:28

Side two
No.	Title	Writer(s)	Length
6.	"Night People"		2:09
7.	"Say Hey"		2:41
8.	"Eyes"		3:32
9.	"Muscle Girls"		1:12
10.	"Theme from a Wooly Place (Wooly Bully/Theme from A Summer Place)"	Mack Discant; Max Steiner; Sam Samudio	0:45
11.	"For a Song"	The Tubes; Rundgren	3:16
12.	"Say Hey (Part 2)"		0:35
13.	"Feel It"	The Tubes; Rundgren; L. Welnick	3:51
14.	"Night People (Reprise)"		1:38
Total length:			41:56

== Personnel ==
=== The Tubes ===
- Fee Waybill – vocals
- Bill Spooner – guitar, vocals
- Michael Cotten – synthesizer
- Prairie Prince – drums
- Roger Steen – guitar, vocals
- Vince Welnick – keyboards
- Rick Anderson – bass

=== Technical ===
- Produced and mixed by Todd Rundgren
- Engineered by Todd Rundgren, Wally Buck, Stacy Baird
- Assistant engineers – Tom Size, Geoff Ganiford
- Art direction – Cotten/Prince Productions, Jim Welch
- Front cover art – Prairie Prince & Michael Cotten
- Back cover photo – Brad Mollath

== Charts ==
Album - Billboard
Year	Chart	Position
1985	US Pop Albums	87
1985	Canada (RPM)	98
