= Leslie Prince Raimond =

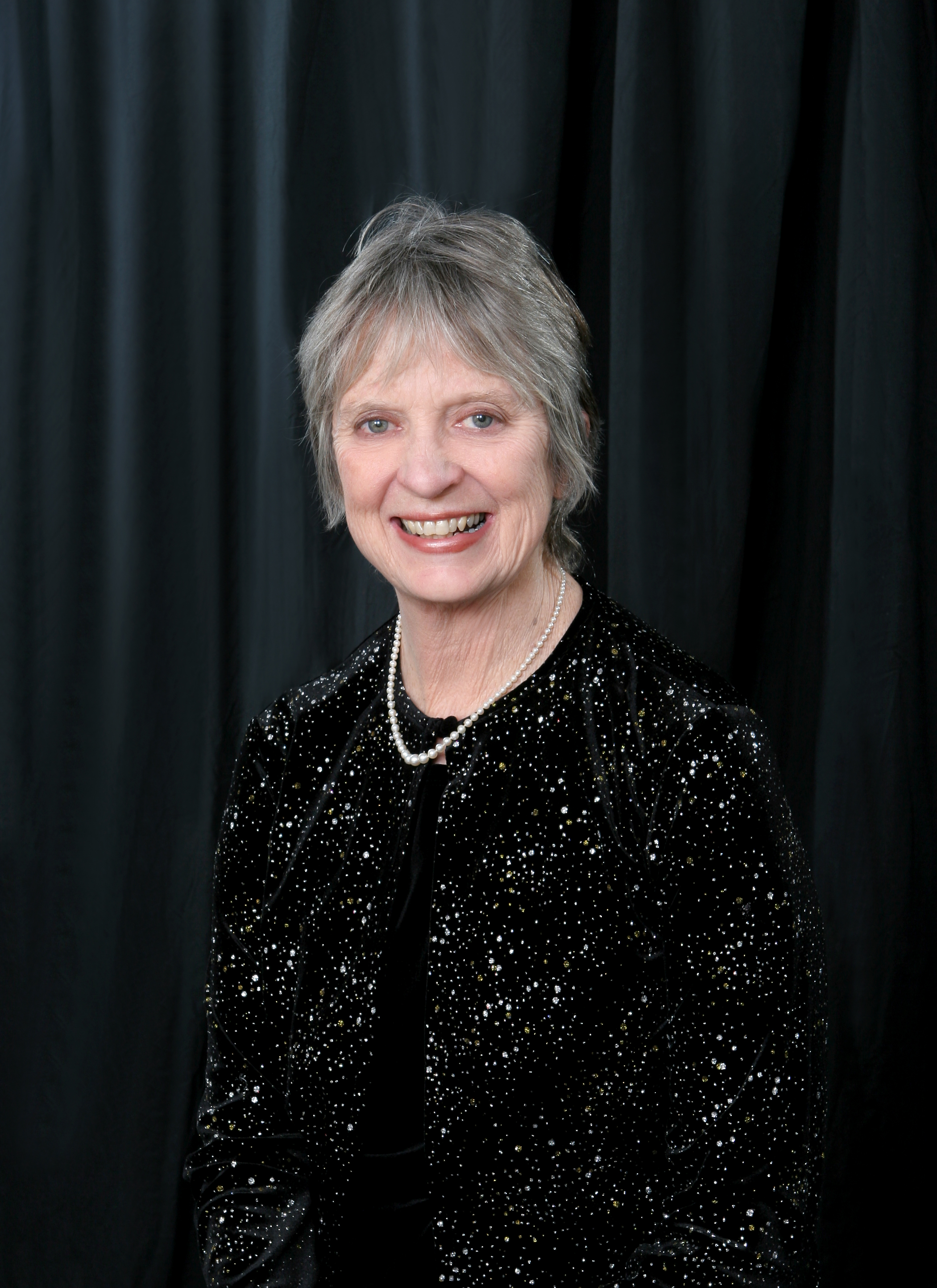
- Born: December 6, 1940 (age 85); Laurinburg, NC
- Education: Washington College

Leslie Prince Raimond (born December 6, 1940) is director emeritus, Kent Cultural Alliance (formerly known as Kent County Arts Council) in Chestertown, Maryland.

In 2005, she and her husband, Vincent Martin Raimond, were the inaugural recipients of the annual Kenny Award, created by the Hedgelawn Foundation. The Vincent and Leslie Prince Raimond Cultural Center, named in honor and recognition of their collective 40 years of service to the people of Kent County through the arts, opened in 2023. It is in the renovated, historic Mansfield/Eliasson house located at 101 Spring Avenue in Chestertown.

== Early life and family ==
Leslie Prince Raimond is the daughter of Charles Lempreire Prince, a cotton broker, and Louisa Grace Prince. Her sister Helen Hannay Prince (1942–2015) was a biologist who worked with James Watson and Stanley B. Prusiner. Her brother is Prairie Prince, The Tubes drummer and an artist.

Her family relocated to Phoenix, Arizona from Laurinburg, North Carolina in 1950. She moved to Chestertown, MD in 1960 to attend Washington College. She holds a Bachelor of Arts in English and a Master of Arts in English from Washington College.

She married Vincent Martin Raimond (1922–2014) in 1967. They have three children: Morgan, Francesca, and Daniel.

== Career ==
After graduating with a Bachelor of Arts in English and a teaching degree in 1963, Raimond became an English teacher at Galena High School on the Eastern Shore of Maryland. She also taught children and adults ballet, creative movement, ballroom dance and theater/drama group classes. For 25 year, she hosted the weekly radio show "The Eclectic Leslie", which played music from a variety of genres.

Vincent Raimond founded The Kent County Arts Council in 1975. In 1984, Vince and Leslie Raimond founded Actors Community Theater (ACT), which went on to host over 100 productions. Leslie Prince Raimond led the Kent County Arts Council from 1989 to 2017 and supported many aspects of the arts in the county, including First Fridays, Riverside Blues Festival, Chestertown Jazz Festival, Art Shows, Music in the Park, and establishing an Arts and Entertainment District in Chestertown.

Leslie Prince Raimond's involvement with the Kent County Senior Center increased her awareness of the local African American communities. She became involved in producing musical events such as the 100 Voice Choir and produced recordings of local gospel singers. While executive director of the Kent County Arts Council, she facilitated the restoration of a historic fraternal lodge Charles Sumner Post No.25, Grand Army of the Republic, now known as Sumner Hall. It is one of only two Grand Army of the Republic halls for African-American veterans known to survive in the United States. The building is now used for holding events that celebrate and commemorate African-American heritage.
