= Genius of America =

Studio album by the Tubes
- Released: October 15, 1996
- Genre: Rock
- Length: 53:15
- Label: Critique
- Producer: Richard Marx; the Tubes

The Tubes chronology
Love Bomb (1985)	Genius of America (1996)	Wild in London (2005)

Professional ratings
Review scores
Source	Rating
Allmusic	4/5 stars

Genius of America is the eighth studio album by American rock band the Tubes and marked their return to the studio for the first time since 1985's Love Bomb. The band self-produced the album and is their first body of work to include Gary Cambra. The album was released on October 15, 1996. A CD featuring re-mixed versions of the songs plus two bonus tracks was released in Europe in 1999 as Hoods from Outer Space.

== Track listing ==
1. "Genius of America" (Cambra, Prince) – 4:00
2. "Arms of the Enemy" (Cambra, Waybill) – 4:29
3. "Say What You Want" (Cambra, Waybill) – 4:09
4. "How Can You Live With Yourself" (Marx, Waybill) – 5:15
5. "Big Brother's Still Watching" (Lukather, Marx, Waybill) – 5:31
6. "After All You Said" (Steen, Waybill) – 4:29
7. "Fishhouse" (Cambra, Prince, Steen) – 4:38
8. "Fastest Gun Alive" (Anderson, Cambra, Steen, Waybill) – 5:05
9. "I Never Saw It Comin'" (Cambra, Waybill) – 3:19
10. "Who Names the Hurricanes" (Cambra, Prince) – 4:50
11. "It's Too Late" (Steen, Waybill) – 2:52
12. "Around the World" (Cambra, Waybill) – 4:47

== Hoods from Outer Space Track listing ==
1. "Hoods from Outer Space" (Cambra, Steen, Waybill) – 4:07
2. "I Know You" (Lukather, Waybill) – 3:51
3. "Say What You Want" (Cambra, Waybill) – 4:09
4. "Around the World" (Cambra, Waybill) – 4:23
5. "Genius of America" (Cambra, Prince) – 4:13
6. "Who Names the Hurricanes" (Cambra, Prince) – 4:46
7. "It's Too Late" (Steen, Waybill) – 2:50
8. "How Can You Live With Yourself" (Marx, Waybill) – 5:14
9. "I Never Saw It Comin'" (Cambra, Waybill) – 3:17
10. "Arms of the Enemy" (Cambra, Waybill) – 4:36
11. "Fishhouse" (Cambra, Prince, Steen) – 4:36
12. "Big Brother's Still Watching" (Lukather, Marx, Waybill) – 4:53
13. "Fastest Gun Alive" (Anderson, Cambra, Steen, Waybill) – 5:03
14. "After All You Said" (Steen, Waybill) – 4:26

== Personnel ==
Musicians
The Tubes

- Fee Waybill – lead vocals
- Roger Steen – electric and acoustic guitars, vocals
- Gary Cambra – electric and acoustic guitars, vocals, keyboards
- Rick Anderson – bass
- Prairie Prince – drums, percussion; voices on "Who names the Hurricanes"

Additional personnel

- Richard Marx – acoustic guitar, piano, strings, synthesizer bass, vocals
- Jennifer McPhee – vocals
- David Medd – vocals
- Anita Whitaker – vocals

Production

- Mike Ainsworth – assistant engineer
- Chris Bellman – mastering
- Bob Biles – engineer
- David Bryant – assistant engineer
- Michael Cotton – concept consultant
- Bill Darm – engineer
- Annamaria DiSanto – photography
- Bill Drescher – engineer, mixing
- Rory Earnshaw – photography
- Kim Foscato – engineer
- Dave Huron – assistant engineer
- Michael Johnson – assistant engineer
- Paul Knotter – concept consultant
- Kenji Nakai – assistant engineer
- Prairie Prince – art direction, design, photography
- Ralph Provino – concept consultant
- Witold Riedel – art direction
