= Missing Man Formation (album) =

Studio album by Missing Man Formation
- Released: April 28, 1998
- Genre: Rock
- Length: 61:08
- Label: Grateful Dead Records
- Producers: John Cutler, Vince Welnick

Missing Man Formation is an album by the rock band Missing Man Formation. Their only album, it was released by Grateful Dead Records on April 28, 1998.

The band Missing Man Formation was led by keyboardist, vocalist, and songwriter Vince Welnick, who had been a member of the Grateful Dead, and before that, the Tubes, and Todd Rundgren's band. At the time that they recorded their eponymous CD, Missing Man Formation also included Steve Kimock on guitar, Bobby Vega on bass, and Prairie Prince on drums.

The album was recorded at Studio E in Sebastopol, California, with the exception of the last track. This song, "Smog Farm", was recorded at the band's first live performance, on July 4, 1996. The words to a few of the songs were written by Grateful Dead lyricists Robert Hunter or John Perry Barlow, including one tune, "Samba in the Rain", that had been part of the Dead's repertoire in the early '90s.

== Critical reception ==
Professional ratings
Review scores
Source	Rating
Allmusic	2.5/5 stars
The Music Box	3/5 stars

On Allmusic, Tom Schulte wrote, "Missing Man Formation is high-caliber musicianship fueling '70s-style rock ballads and jazz-like instrumentals.... Vince Welnick entered the Grateful Dead fold as keyboardist in 1990. The extended musical circles he moves in (minus any elder Dead notables) turned up several talented combinations during the group's short, two-year life.... Post-production and care in selection make this CD an excellent overview of the group's material. Excepting the mellow "Fabiana" by Bobby Vega, no track clocks in at under six minutes."

Writing in The Music Box in 1999, when the band was still together, John Metzger said, "The debut disc from Vince Welnick's Missing Man Formation is a posthumous look back at the original group, which included drummer Prairie Prince as well as Zero's Steve Kimock and Bobby Vega. Prior to this release, the band had performed far too few dates, mostly along the West Coast, and the subsequent personnel changes most likely were made to give Welnick more leeway in taking the band out on the road. In a sense, this disc is also a passing of the torch. Robin Sylvester and Trey Sabatelli both provide backing vocals on this release, and they were later tapped to play bass and drums, respectively, on Missing Man Formation's last tour. Also joining the new incarnation of the group is saxophonist Bobby Strickland..."

In the Hartford Courant, John M. Moran wrote, "In [Missing Man Formation], Welnick and a collection of San Francisco-area musicians (such as Zero's Steve Kimock, ubiquitous drummer Prairie Prince, Zero bassist Bobby Vega) range widely over the musical terrain — moving from flat-out rockers to bluesy ballads, to lengthy space jams and improvisations. Through it all, Welnick's piano work is predictably solid, if unspectacular. More surprising are his vocals, which are strong and interesting in a gritty sort of way."

== Track listing ==
1. "Golden Days" (Vince Welnick) – 8:24
2. "The Devil I Know" (Welnick, Bob Bralove, John Perry Barlow) – 6:15
3. "Fabiana" (Bobby Vega) – 2:22
4. "Golden Stairs" (Welnick, Robert Hunter) – 6:23
5. "Samba in the Rain" (Welnick, Hunter) – 6:43
6. "It's Alive" (Welnick) – 7:39
7. "True Blue" (Welnick) – 10:03
8. "Smog Farm" (Welnick) – 13:12

== Personnel ==
=== Missing Man Formation ===
- Vince Welnick – keyboards, lead vocals
- Steve Kimock – guitar
- Prairie Prince – drums
- Bobby Vega – bass

=== Additional musicians ===
- Robin Sylvester – twelve-string guitar, vocals
- Bobby Strickland – saxophone, bass clarinet, vocals
- Scott Mathews – congas, talking drum, tambourine
- Trey Sabatelli – vocals
- Barbara Mauritz – vocals
- Juan Cutler – percussion

=== Production ===
- Producers: John Cutler, Vince Welnick
- Recording: Kene Eberhard, Michael Bendinelli, Richard Fisher
- Overdubbing and mixing: John Cutler, Jeffrey Norman
- Project coordinator: Patricia Harris
- Illustrations: Michael Cotten, Prairie Prince
- Tray card art: Kene Eberhard
- Inside photo: Susana Millman
- Package design: Amy Finkle
