= Missing Man Formation (band) =

American rock band (1996–2000)

Missing Man Formation was a band put together by former Grateful Dead keyboardist Vince Welnick, featuring Welnick and an ever-changing group of musicians, including Scott Mathews and Steve Kimock on guitar (eventually replaced by John Wedemeyer, Terry Haggerty and Mark Holzinger), Prairie Prince on drums (eventually replaced by Trey Sabatelli), Bobby Vega on bass (eventually replaced by Robin Sylvester) and others, most notably, Bobby Strickland (reeds and flute).

== History ==
The band performed primarily between 1996 and 2000, mostly in the San Francisco Bay Area, often at the Fillmore Auditorium, and generally for two sets lasting two hours or more; or at music festivals, where they played shorter sets. Guest performers included artists such as Scott Mathews, Todd Rundgren, Michelle Rundgren, Scott Black, Annie Simpson and Diana Mangano. The band was managed by Stephanie Kesey.

== Studio work ==
Their first and only album, Missing Man Formation, was released in 1998. It includes a version of "Samba in the Rain", written for the Dead by Welnick and Robert Hunter, another Welnick/Hunter song "Golden Stairs", and "Devil I Know", by Welnick with John Perry Barlow and Bob Bralove.

== Live performances ==
During performances, the band generally played, in addition to the material on that album, songs written by (or for, or popularized by) the Grateful Dead (e.g., "The Wheel", "Stella Blue", "Scarlet Begonias", "Standing On The Moon", "Not Fade Away", "Long Way To Go Home") The Beatles (e.g., "Helter Skelter", "All You Need Is Love"), Bob Dylan (e.g., "It's All Over Now, Baby Blue", and songs written by other well-known rock and roll bands (e.g., "Kashmir", by Led Zeppelin, "Change Is Gonna Come" by Sam Cooke, "You Can't Always Get What You Want", by the Rolling Stones and "Godzilla", by Blue Öyster Cult).

== Discography ==
- Missing Man Formation (1998)
