= Ladies and Gentlemen, The Fabulous Stains =

1982 film by Lou Adler

- Original film poster
- Directed by: Lou Adler
- Written by: Nancy Dowd (Note: Credited under the pseudonym Rob Morton)
- Produced by: Joe Roth
- Starring: Diane Lane; Laura Dern; Marin Kanter; Ray Winstone; Peter Donat; David Clennon; John Lehne; Cynthia Sikes; Fee Waybill; Paul Simonon; Vince Welnick; Christine Lahti
- Cinematography: Bruce Surtees
- Edited by: Tom Benko
- Production companies: Red Stripe Films, Ink
- Distributed by: Paramount Pictures
- Release date: October 1982
- Running time: 87 minutes
- Country: United States
- Language: English

Ladies and Gentlemen, The Fabulous Stains is a 1982 American teen musical comedy-drama film directed by Lou Adler and starring Diane Lane, Laura Dern, and Marin Kanter as three teenage girls who start a punk rock band called the Stains. The film also features acting roles by real-life punk musicians including Steve Jones and Paul Cook of the Sex Pistols, Paul Simonon from the Clash, and Vince Welnick and Fee Waybill from the Tubes.

The Stains are depicted suffering the derision of male audiences and peers, but their dedication—and the fiery public persona of lead singer Corinne Burns—gains them a strong female fanbase that ultimately eclipses their antagonists.

Adler and screenwriter Nancy Dowd (aided by Caroline Coon) disagreed starkly on the film's ending, and it was put on hold for two years until it was capped by Adler with the music video. Although it failed to make any commercial headway with its initial release in late 1982, the film became a cult favorite on 1980s cable television, particularly the late-night series Night Flight. Its reputation grew, and it is considered an influence on the riot grrl movement.

== Plot ==
In Charlestown, Pennsylvania, 17-year-old orphan Corinne Burns is fired from her job at a fast-food restaurant after lashing out at her boss while appearing on live television. The segment resonates with the station's teenage viewers, who view Corinne as a kindred spirit. The station conducts a follow-up interview, in which Corinne makes sarcastic remarks to the journalist before mentioning she is the lead singer of the garage band the Stains, which she has formed with her sister Tracy and their cousin Jessica McNeil.

Corinne attends a concert organized by small-time tour manager Lawnboy, featuring the washed-up metal band the Metal Corpses and their opening act, an up-and-coming British punk band called the Looters. Eager to end hostilities between the jaded Metal Corpses and the hedonistic Looters, Lawnboy signs the Stains without having heard them perform. Corinne and the Stains join the tour, witnessing firsthand the bands' animosity between the aging Lou Corpse, the frontman of the Metal Corpses, and Billy, the Looters' volatile lead singer.

At their first show, the Stains prove to be completely inept as a band: neither Jessica nor Tracy can play instruments, and Corinne sings in an off-key monotone. The band is jeered by the crowd, prompting Corinne to lash out at the audience. After the show, the Metal Corpses' guitar player Jerry Jervey is found dead of a drug overdose in the bathroom, and the band leaves the tour. Taking advantage of the media attention, Corinne claims on TV that Jerry was in love with her and died of a broken heart. Lawnboy makes the Looters the new headliners with the Stains as their opening act. A dissatisfied Billy asks Lawnboy to replace the Stains.

At their next show, Corinne debuts a new, bolder punk look, with hair dyed to resemble a skunk and a see-through blouse worn over a pair of bikini briefs. Proclaiming that she "never puts out", she goes on another tirade, grabbing more media attention. While male journalists focus on Corinne's antisocial attitude and the band's lack of talent, women hail the Stains as a new voice of female empowerment. The Stains soon become a national sensation, with girls all over the country emulating Corinne's hair, makeup, outfits, and rebellious attitude.

During a tour stop at a motel, Billy reveals his illiteracy to Corinne and recites the lyrics to the song "Join the Professionals", which sums up his personal feelings about the state of the world. Corinne and Billy then make out in the shower. At the next stop, Billy meets with Lawnboy's agent, Dave Robell, who introduces the intended replacement act for the Stains, Black Randy and the Metrosquad. Although Billy tells Corinne that he only wanted her replaced early on in the tour, Corinne lashes out at him, and at the Stains' next show, they play a cover version of "Join the Professionals", which skyrockets the band to even further stardom. With Robell's encouragement, Corinne signs a new contract, cutting Lawnboy out of any royalties and making the Stains the new headliners of the tour.

At the next show, Billy delivers a speech to the crowd about how the Stains have betrayed their "never put out" mantra by becoming corporate sellouts. When the Stains come onstage, the fans riot and Corinne is attacked with a tube of hair dye. The tour becomes a financial disaster and Robell cancels the Stains' contract. Corinne responds by threatening him with a bottle opener and taking the money he has been withholding from her; Corinne then gives the money to Lawnboy as an apology.

The next morning, Corinne appears on television, where an antagonistic male journalist chastises her for being a poor role model to her fans. Billy apologizes for ruining Corinne's career and asks her to come back as the Looters' opening act, but she refuses. As Corinne wanders the streets, she overhears a radio broadcast identifying the Stains' first song as a hit record. Some time later, the Stains make their MTV debut with a slick and polished music video, having become a successful act on Lawnboy's new record label.

== Cast ==
- Diane Lane as Corinne Burns (also known as "Third Degree" Burns), vocalist for the Stains
- Ray Winstone as Billy, vocalist for the Looters
- Peter Donat as Harley Dennis
- David Clennon as Dave Robell, the agent
- John Lehne as Stu McGrath
- Cynthia Sikes as Alicia Meeker
- Laura Dern as Jessica McNeil (also known as "Peg" or "Dizzy Heights"), bassist for the Stains
- Marin Kanter as Tracy Burns (also known as "Dee Pleted"), guitarist for the Stains
- Paul Cook as Danny, drummer for the Looters
- Steve Jones as Steve, guitarist for the Looters
- Barry Ford as Lawnboy
- Paul Simonon as Johnny, bassist for the Looters
- Fee Waybill as Lou Corpse, vocalist for the Metal Corpses
- Christine Lahti as Aunt Linda
- Janet Wright as Brenda, Aunt Linda's friend
- Vince Welnick as Jerry Jervey, guitarist for the Metal Corpses

The film features several punk rock musicians in acting roles: Steve Jones and Paul Cook of the Sex Pistols, Paul Simonon from the Clash, and Vince Welnick and Fee Waybill from the Tubes. Los Angeles punk rocker Black Randy from Black Randy and the Metrosquad makes an appearance as himself and as "Mexican Randy".

Musician Barry Ford, formerly of the reggae band Merger, plays the promoter nicknamed Lawnboy. Ford composed the majority of the soundtrack including the title song "All Washed Up", which features Jones, Cook, and Simonon. The song "Join the Professionals" was written and previously recorded by Jones and Cook's post-Pistols band, the Professionals.

The film also features brief appearances by Elizabeth Daily as a hotel maid, and Brent Spiner.

== Production ==
The original project had the working title All Washed Up. Once underway, the film was directed by music business tycoon Lou Adler for Paramount Pictures. The script was written by Nancy Dowd, who had won the Best Screenplay Academy Award for Coming Home. The movie was produced by Joe Roth, who would later become chairman of Walt Disney Studios.

In the mid-1970s, Caroline Coon was working as a Melody Maker music journalist and had earned a reputation as an early proponent of punk rock. Dowd, who was interested in writing a script about the new movement, contacted her and made an exploratory visit to London. Coon told Dowd that feminism was "the next big thing to come in punk rock", and the two began collaborating on the storyline to a film.

On his KLOS radio show in 2018, Steve Jones talked with Fee Waybill about how filming began in the winter of 1980 in Vancouver, Canada. Waybill recalled a scene that required Ray Winstone to hit him in the eye—which he did, accidentally, at full force. With his eye visibly swelling, Waybill completed the scene and it was kept in the final cut of the film.

Adler and Dowd had competing visions for the film right from the start. It was the ending, however, that caused them to collide. The original storyline was supposed to end with girls across the UK proudly emulating the Stains, but Coon says this inspirational concept was "muted by its male director". Tensions rose as Adler demanded a rewrite, and ultimately Coon and Dowd walked off the set for good. Dowd removed her name from the script, and is credited under the pseudonym "Rob Morton" in the final cut. The film was shelved without an ending for two years, until Adler tacked on an exuberant Stains music video that gave the impression that the band had achieved stardom. The film fared poorly among test audiences and did not get a general release.

Diane Ladd, Laura Dern's mother, refused to give her permission, so Dern sued for legal emancipation, and did the movie.

The film is set in an economically depressed section of Pennsylvania but was shot around Vancouver.

== Release ==
The film was screened in a tiny number of theaters in October 1982 and earned a box office gross just over US$25,000. Eventually the film made its way to cable television. Night Flight, the weekend counter-culture programming block on USA Network (of which Paramount was a partial owner), began regularly airing the film, and it found an audience. Off the positive reception of the airings, sub-distributor Films Inc. licensed the film from Paramount.

The film's next theatrical engagements included showings at Film Forum in New York City on Wednesday, March 6, 1985, in Chicago in April 1985, in Atlanta and Los Angeles in July 1985, and at the Theater of the Living Arts in Philadelphia from Friday, August 23 to Saturday, August 24, 1985.

Rhino Home Video released a DVD on September 16, 2008. The disc featured bonus commentary tracks, one from Adler and a second with both Lane and Dern together. A Blu-Ray edition was released in Australia in 2022 by ViaVision/Imprint.

The film eventually made its way to the repertory and art house circuit, and screenings of the film, once a rarity, have grown more frequent in recent years.

=== 4K Remaster ===
In early spring of 2025, Fun City Editions announced that they would be releasing the worldwide debut of the film on 4K UHD Blu-ray. The release was scheduled for January 20, 2026., and on June 3, 2026 the 4k version was screened at Nitehawk, Prospect Park in Brooklyn, in celebration of NightFlight's 45th anniversary.

== Reception ==
Ladies and Gentlemen, The Fabulous Stains holds a rating of 64% from 14 reviews on Rotten Tomatoes.

== Influence ==
The film predated the riot grrl scene of the 1990s, and among its early fans were members of Bikini Kill and Bratmobile. Other fans of the film include writer/podcaster Jake Fogelnest, and underground filmmaker Sarah Jacobson, as well as musician/actress Kate Nash, who revealed in a web interview that she dyed her hair to match Corinne's. In 2000, Jacobson directed, with Sam Green, a short documentary on the film for the IFC television show Split Screen.
