= Leila and the Snakes =

Rock band

Leila and the Snakes was an American rock group based out of San Francisco in the 1970s and 1980s.

The group was led by Jane Dornacker (alias "Leila"), who had previously toured with The Tubes. Other members of the group were Pamela Wood on bass and Scott Free on drums, who were later replaced by the brothers Hilary and John Hanes (who billed themselves with the surname "Stench"). Also featured was guitarist Miles Corbin, who went on to form the surf instrumental band the Aqua Velvets.

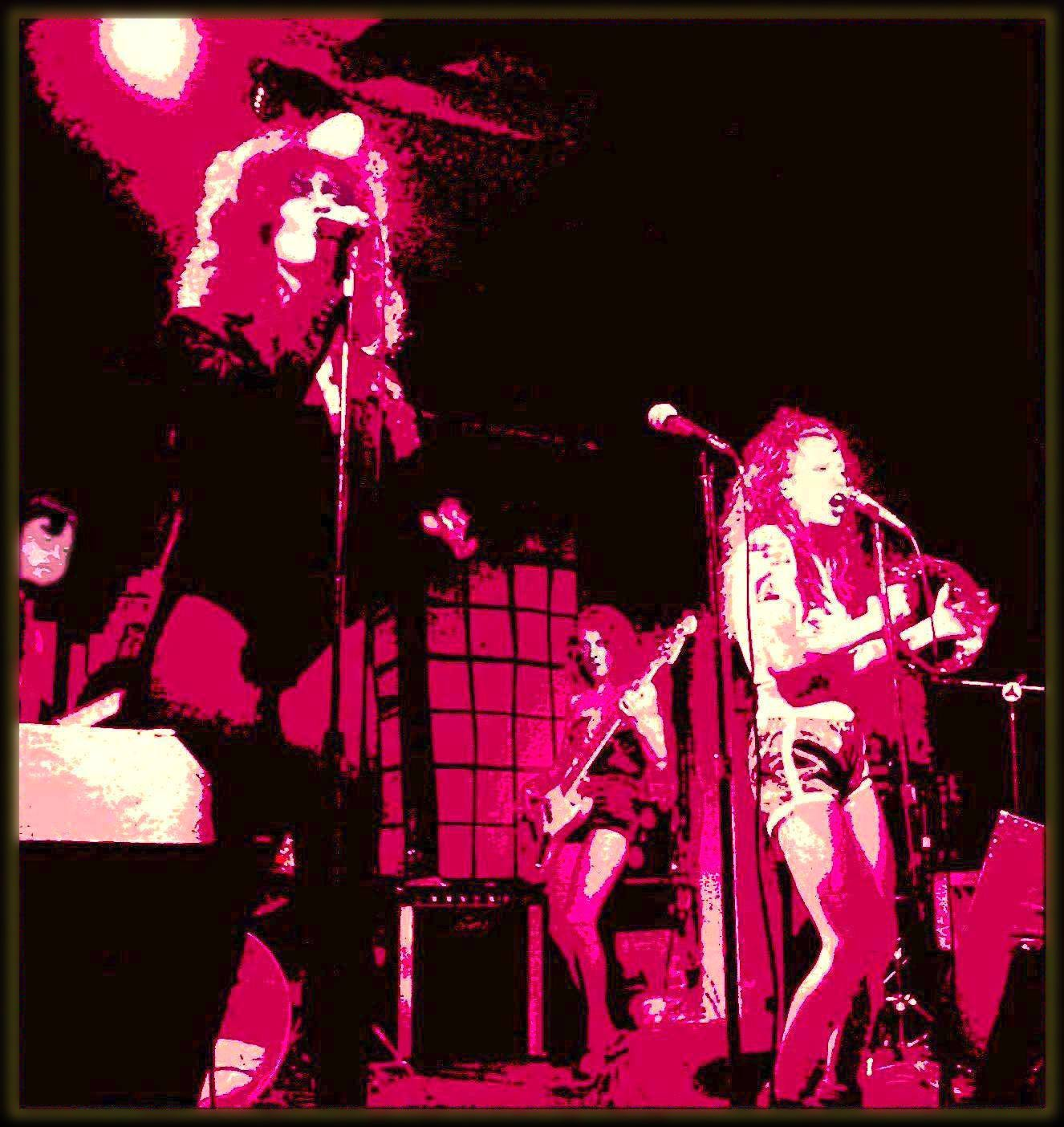
Leila and the Snakes performing in SF, 1980

The band only produced one official release, a single on the ADP label in 1978. Produced by Roger Clark (of Little Roger and the Goosebumps) and arranged by Dick Bright, the record features "Rock and Roll Weirdos" (written by Dornacker), with "Pyramid Power" (written by Dornacker and Clark) on the flip side. Also featured on the record (which cheekily showed the group's bare buttocks on the back of the sleeve) was Pearl E. Gates, who was also part of the Snakes' live act. Eventually, Pearl would quit the group, taking with her the Stench brothers, in order to front her own band, Pearl Harbor and the Explosions. (Pearl would later marry Paul Simonon of The Clash, and sing backup on that group's LP Sandinista!).

The band also recorded an album produced by Hugh Cornwell of The Stranglers. No final mix was done, however, and tracks remained unreleased until 2006, when Corbin self-released them as a 12-track album, "Leila and the Snakes".

== Later years ==
Post-Leila, Dornacker became a prominent radio personality in San Francisco as well as played Nurse Murch in the 1983 motion picture The Right Stuff. In 1985, she moved to New York to become a traffic reporter on WNBC radio; she died the following year when the helicopter she was reporting from crashed into the Hudson River, live on-air. It was the second time her traffic helicopter crashed. After the first crash, she negotiated a very large life insurance policy before returning to her job.
