= Darcel Leonard Wynne =

American dancer, choreographer, author and producer

Darcel Leonard-Wynne (born June 13, 1951, in Pittsburgh, Pennsylvania), sometimes credited as simply Darcel, is an American dancer, choreographer, author and producer, best known for heading the "Solid Gold Dancers" on the syndicated 1980s music series Solid Gold.

== Early life and career ==
Darcel was born into a steelworking family. She started dancing at the age of 3 and then continued her dancing lessons in Los Angeles when her family moved there in the 1960s. There, she performed at first at a local variety show, and later joined Carol Burnett Show and Rowan & Martin's Laugh-In. Darcel danced and toured with The Temptations as well as with Pearl Bailey in Hello, Dolly!.

As her popularity grew, so did her exposure in the entertainment world and she soon appeared in the films Xanadu, Funny Lady, Jesus Christ Superstar, Night Shift, The Girl, the Gold Watch & Dynamite, The Last Married Couple in America, Scrooged, Funny Girl. Darcel was also featured in the Kool & the Gang video for their single "Fresh". Some of Darcel’s television credits include The Sammy Davis Jr. Show, NBC Follies, Redd Foxx Show, Leslie Uggams Show, The Pearl Bailey Show, The Sonny & Cher Comedy Hour.

=== Solid Gold ===
Darcel made her first national appearance on the hit television series Solid Gold. Darcel's first appearance on Solid Gold was during the two-hour Solid Gold '79., Darcel was one of eight dancers who appeared on the special. Due to the high ratings of Solid Gold '79, the show became a weekly series in late summer 1980. Darcel along with three other dancers (Alexander Cole, Deborah Jenssen, and Paula Beyers) who were on Solid Gold '79 joined Solid Gold once the weekly series started. Another dancer, Gayle Crofoot who was also in Solid Gold '79, appeared on Solid Gold in late 1982.

Darcel appeared on the series first four seasons from 1980 to 1984, after which she left the show for a traveling Christian ministry with her husband, Glenn Leonard of the R&B soul group The Temptations. During the second season of Solid Gold Darcel received more exposure than the other seven dancers as she was featured dancing solo once or twice during the Top 10 countdown. She returned to Solid Gold during the latter part of Season 5 in the summer of 1985. In Season 6 her role on the series enlarged from principal dancer to part-time master of ceremonies, in which she had many speaking parts, including regularly announcing the Top 10 countdown. (Darcel was the first celebrity to do David Letterman’s very popular Top 10 countdown on the Late Show with David Letterman.)

== Personal life ==
She is married to Glenn Leonard, formerly of The Temptations. She has three grown children.

Darcel lives in Los Angeles, where she teaches dance and choreography to mature women; she's coined as her "Seasoned Beauties." She is also active on social media though Facebook and Instagram.

Darcel has written an autobiography: Darcel: Solid Gold. The book reveals a gamut of topics in the dancer's life: her rise to fame, trials and tribulations of fame, marriage and abuse, behind the scenes of Solid Gold; her struggle to establish dance as a ministry in the black church and her return to Hollywood.
