= Solid Gold (Dionne Warwick song) =

Single by Dionne Warwick
- Recorded: 1980
- Genre: Pop
- Length: 1:20
- Songwriters: Michael Miller (music); Dean Pitchford (lyrics)

Music video
- Listen to "Solid Gold" (1981 TV performance) on YouTube

"Solid Gold" is a song performed by Dionne Warwick, composed by Michael K. Miller, lyrics by Dean Pitchford. It is the official theme song of the 1980s TV music show Solid Gold.

Warwick also performed "Solid Gold" on The Tonight Show on June 25, 1981.

The lyrics of the opening verse encapsulate the spirit of both the song and the show:

The music has magic,
You know you can catch it;
If you let the songs take control...

The sound starts to glisten,
The more that you listen,
And slowly it turns into gold...

And here is the catchy chorus:

Solid Gold, filling up my life with music
Solid Gold, putting rhythm in my soul
There’s a song that’s unreeling to fit the way that I’m feeling
My head keeps spinning to music, spinning to gold…
Solid Gold
