= Solid Gold (TV series) =

American music countdown and dance TV series (1980-1988)

- Created by: Al Masini
- Developed by: Bob Banner
- Presented by: Dionne Warwick (1980–81, midway through 84–85 season and all of 85–86 season); Marilyn McCoo (1981–84, 1986–88); Andy Gibb (1981–82); Rex Smith (1982–83); Rick Dees (1984–85); Nina Blackwood (1986–88); Arsenio Hall (1986–88)
- Narrated by: Robert W. Morgan (1980–86); Chuck Riley (1986); Charlie O'Donnell (1986–87); Dick Tufeld (1987–88)
- Opening theme: "Solid Gold Theme" music by Michael Miller lyrics by Dean Pitchford
- Ending theme: "Solid Gold Theme" music by Michael Miller lyrics by Dean Pitchford sung by Dionne Warwick (1980–81, 1985–86); Marilyn McCoo & Andy Gibb (1981–82); Marilyn McCoo & Rex Smith (1982–83); Marilyn McCoo (1983–84); Deborah Davis (1984–85)
- Country of origin: United States
- Original language: English
- No. of seasons: 8
- No. of episodes: 332

Production
- Running time: 60 minutes
- Production companies: Brad Lachman Productions; Bob Banner Associates (1980–1984) (seasons 1–4); Operation Prime Time (1980–1986) (seasons 1–6); Paramount Television Service (1980–1981) (season 1); Paramount Domestic Television (1981–1988) (seasons 2–8)

Original release
- Network: Syndicated
- Release: September 13, 1980 – July 23, 1988

Solid Gold is an American syndicated music television program that debuted on September 13, 1980, (Note: GRAMMY.com gives the date of the debut episode as September 15, 1980.) and ran until July 23, 1988. The program was a production of Brad Lachman Productions in association with Operation Prime Time and Paramount Domestic Television.

== Synopsis ==
Solid Gold featured a weekly rundown of the top ten hits on the pop charts for the week, similar to America's Top 10 which also premiered in 1980. It also featured music artists performing their hits in studio, in the vein of American Bandstand; although there were some cases where a song was actually performed live, like on American Bandstand, artists featured on Solid Gold would almost always perform lip synching over a recording of their song. In fact, on most of the first five seasons of episodes, the only song that was sung live was the show's theme song, which was written by Academy Award winning songwriter Dean Pitchford along with Michael Miller.

The show had an in-house dance troupe that performed choreographed routines to the songs featured on the weekly countdown. The Solid Gold Dancers, as they came to be known, were led for most of the show's run by Darcel Wynne, who had previously performed theatrically in several musicals and in films such as Xanadu. Kevin Carlisle, who recruited the Solid Gold Dancers, worked as the show's choreographer, as did Anita Mann, who was nominated for two Emmy Awards for her work on the series.

== Personnel ==
Singer Dionne Warwick was the original host of the program, hosting for the first season. Warwick's involvement with the program actually began seven months before it premiered. In early 1980, a one-off special was commissioned to honor the performers behind the top songs on the 1979 pop chart. Titled Solid Gold '79, and taped at NBC Studios, Warwick and Glen Campbell hosted the program; the reception from viewers led to Solid Gold being picked up for the fall of 1980 as a weekly series, produced by Operation Prime Time for Paramount Television Service (later Paramount Domestic Television).

In 1981, when contract renegotiations with Dionne Warwick reached an impasse, Paramount replaced her with Marilyn McCoo, formerly of The Fifth Dimension, as host, with Andy Gibb joining as her co-host; the pairing only lasted one year as Gibb's continued issues with substance abuse forced Paramount to fire him. Actor Rex Smith took over for Gibb for 1982, but Rex Smith left the show after one season in 1982-1983 to focus on his music and acting career while McCoo hosted the 1983-84 season by herself.

Rick Dees, the host of the Weekly Top 40 radio countdown show, hosted the fifth season of Solid Gold in 1984–85. In May 1985 Broadcasting reported that he would leave the show that August, keeping his Los Angeles radio show, his syndicated weekly radio series and his film work. Dionne Warwick returned as host for the 1985–86 season, and in May 1986 she announced that she would not come back for the seventh season. Marilyn McCoo returned in 1986 and was joined by former MTV host Nina Blackwood. Arsenio Hall, who had been a part of the show since 1984, was promoted to serve as a second co-host; all three would remain in these roles until Solid Gold came to an end in July 1988.

Los Angeles disc jockey Robert W. Morgan was the original announcer for Solid Gold, running for seven seasons before leaving in 1986 Charlie O'Donnell, the announcer for American Bandstand, replaced Morgan but only stayed on until the end of the 1986-87 season with Chuck Riley standing in for one episode. The final season was announced by Dick Tufeld.

Approximately halfway through each program, the show broke format briefly for a stand-up comedy performance. Comedian Marty Cohen was an early regular featured performer on Solid Gold, as was Wayland Flowers. Arsenio Hall was a regular performer before taking over as co-host in 1986, while other comedians featured included Jeff Altman and Byron Allen.

For the 1987-88 season, the format was overhauled entirely with the focus instead being on performances rather than the weekly countdown. The show changed its name to Solid Gold In Concert for the year to indicate the new emphasis; while the Solid Gold Dancers still were a part of the proceedings, they did not perform as often over the course of a program due to more time being given to the week's featured performers.

== Reception ==
Reviews of the show were not always positive, with The New York Times referring to it as "the pop music show that is its own parody...[enacting] mini-dramas...of covetousness, lust and aerobic toning—routines that typically have a minimal connection with the songs that back them up."
