= White Punks on Dope =

Single by the Tubes

from the album The Tubes
- B-side: "White Punks on Dope Part II"
- Released: 1975
- Recorded: 1975
- Genre: Glam rock
- Length: 3:18
- Label: A&M
- Songwriters: Bill Spooner; Roger Steen; Michael Evans
- Producer: Al Kooper

The Tubes singles chronology
"Don't Touch Me There" (1976)	"White Punks on Dope" (1975)	"Prime Time" (1977)

"White Punks on Dope", abbreviated as "WPOD", is a 1975 song by San Francisco-based rock group the Tubes from their debut album, produced by Al Kooper. The song was written by the band's dual lead guitarists, Bill Spooner and Roger Steen, with Michael Evans. It has been called an "absurd anthem of wretched excess", ridiculing the rich and famous offspring of Hollywood elite. The song became the group's rock anthem and spectacular closing number to their elaborate stage shows. The band developed a cult-like fan base that has followed them for decades.

Known for frequent costume changes, the group's lead singer Fee Waybill plays the character of Quay Lewd (a take-off on Quaalude), a drugged-out British rock star wearing two-foot-tall platform shoes, a feather boa and a long blonde wig. In his early career as a choreographer for the band, Kenny Ortega would add elements to try to make every show more spectacular. There were explosions, smoke, chainsaws and a daredevil aerial artist. Among the barely-dressed dancers and characters were Jane Dornacker and Pearl E. Gates. Up-and-coming local actor-comedian Robin Williams auditioned for the show.

Two years later, the single reached No. 28 on the British charts.
