= Vince Welnick =

American musician (1951–2006)

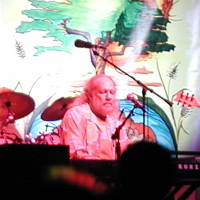
- Vince Welnick performing live in 2005

Background information
- Born: February 21, 1951; Phoenix, Arizona, U.S.
- Died: June 2, 2006 (aged 55) Sonoma County, California, U.S.
- Occupation: Musician
- Instruments: Keyboards, vocals
- Years active: 1973–2006
- Formerly of: Grateful Dead; The Tubes; Todd Rundgren; Missing Man Formation; RatDog; Mickey Hart Band; Second Sight; The Affordables
- Website: www.vincewelnick.com

Vincent Leo Welnick (February 21, 1951 – June 2, 2006) was an American keyboardist and singer-songwriter, best known for playing with the band The Tubes during the 1970s and 1980s and with the Grateful Dead in the 1990s. He was inducted into the Rock and Roll Hall of Fame in 1994 as a member of the Grateful Dead.

== Music career ==
Welnick was born in Phoenix, Arizona, the great-grandson of Prussian immigrants. He started playing keyboards as a teenager. He joined a band, the Beans, which eventually morphed into the Tubes, a San Francisco-based theater rock band popular in the late 1970s and early 1980s and noted for early live performances that combined lewd quasi-pornography with wild satires of media, consumerism and politics.

The Tubes in the 1980s were a major commercial rock act with substantial MTV success. Videos for "Talk to Ya Later" and "She's a Beauty" played in heavy rotation on MTV in the mid-1980s. While playing in the Tubes, Welnick met Todd Rundgren during the recording of "Remote Control" and later joined Rundgren's touring band.

When Grateful Dead keyboardist Brent Mydland died of a drug overdose on July 26, 1990, the band began auditioning players to replace him, including Ian McLagan, Pete Sears and T Lavitz. Welnick was selected, not least for his high vocal range for backup harmonies. Welnick's first show with the Grateful Dead was on September 7, 1990, at the Richfield Coliseum in Richfield, Ohio. His Associated Press obituary mentioned he was so nervous at his first gig with the band that he could barely play, until the fans put him at ease. They held up banners reading, "Yo Vinnie," which Welnick later decided to use as the name of his BMI-affiliated publishing company, Yo Vinnie Music, after he got his writer and publisher rights back from Ice Nine Publishing, which had copyrighted his works without an agreement in place to do so shortly after Welnick joined the Grateful Dead. Bruce Hornsby also supplemented Welnick on grand piano for over 100 shows during Welnick's first years in the Dead. Welnick remained as a member of the Grateful Dead and the band's keyboard player until Jerry Garcia's death in August 1995, when the group disbanded.

In 1994, he was inducted into the Rock and Roll Hall of Fame as a member of the Grateful Dead.

Welnick became depressed following a diagnosis of cancer and emphysema shortly before the final Grateful Dead tour. He decided to do the summer 1995 Grateful Dead tour and wait to have surgery until after the tour ended. Shortly after the tour was over, Jerry Garcia died. Welnick joined Bob Weir's new group, Ratdog, as the keyboard player, touring with them around the US. About six months after Garcia's death, Welnick attempted suicide on the tour bus to Monterey, California. He received therapy, successful cancer treatment, and management of the early stages of lung disease. He worked with the band Second Sight, with Bob Bralove, and with Missing Man Formation, which released an album that included the song "Golden Days", a tribute to Garcia. He participated in the second Phil Lesh and Friends show in March 1998, and he toured the US with the Mickey Hart Band later that year.

In 1998, Bob Weir, Phil Lesh, and Mickey Hart regrouped under the name the Other Ones. According to musician and publisher Mike Lawson, Welnick was troubled when they reunited without him under the term the "surviving members of Grateful Dead". He voiced frustration to Rolling Stone, saying, "I am and always will be a member of the Grateful Dead. It's a lifetime thing that Jerry bestows upon a person." Welnick toured with jam bands, recorded music in his home studio, and worked with friends on their albums. With the band Mood Food he finished a reggae version of "To Love Somebody" by the Bee Gees. He left behind hundreds of hours of unreleased material, both personal and professional recordings.

== Film ==
Welnick played a small part in the 1981 film Ladies and Gentlemen, The Fabulous Stains. Fee Waybill of the Tubes played Lou Corpse, the washed-up front man of a band called The Metal Corpses. Welnick played Jerry Jervey, the guitar player (though the reporter calls him the bass player) with the Corpses, who dies of an overdose in a backstage bathroom.

Welnick also appeared in Xanadu, along with the rest of the Tubes.

== Death ==
After struggling with depression for ten years, Welnick died by suicide on June 2, 2006. He was 55 years old.

== Discography ==
With The Tubes

- The Tubes (1975)
- Young and Rich (1976)
- Now (1977)
- What Do You Want from Live (1978)
- Remote Control (1979)
- The Completion Backward Principle (1981)
- Outside Inside (1983)
- Love Bomb (1985)
- Infomercial: How to Become Tubular (2000)
- Mondo Birthmark (2009)

With Todd Rundgren

- Nearly Human (1989)
- 2nd Wind (1991)

With Grateful Dead

- Infrared Roses (1991)
- Fallout from the Phil Zone (1997)
- Dick's Picks Volume 9 (1997)
- So Many Roads (1965-1995) (1999)
- Dick's Picks Volume 17 (2000)
- View from the Vault, Volume Two (2001)
- Dick's Picks Volume 27 (2003)
- Grateful Dead Download Series Volume 11 (2006)
- Road Trips Volume 2 Number 1 (2008)
- Road Trips Volume 2 Number 4 (2009)
- 30 Trips Around the Sun (2015)
- 30 Trips Around the Sun: The Definitive Live Story 1965–1995 (2015)
- Giants Stadium 1987, 1989, 1991 (2019)
- Saint of Circumstance (2019)
- Ready or Not (2019)
- Enjoying the Ride (2025)
- The Music Never Stopped (2025)
- Dave's Picks Volume 55 (2025)
- Dave's Picks Volume 59 (2026)

With others

- Chance in a Million (1994) – Zero
- Calling Up Spirits (1996) – Dick Dale
- Second Sight (1996) – Second Sight
- Fiesta Amazonica (1998) – Merl Saunders
- Missing Man Formation (1998) – Missing Man Formation
- Might as Well... (2000) – The Persuasions
- Smallstone (2000) – Smallstone
- Uh-Oh! (2001) – Tipsy
- Texistentialism (2007) – Jerry Lightfoot's Band of Wonder
