= The Tubes =

American rock band

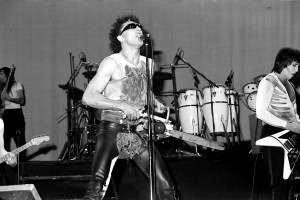
- The Tubes in 1977

Background information
- Origin: San Francisco, California, U.S.
- Genres: Art rock; glam rock; proto-punk
- Years active: 1972–present
- Labels: A&M; Capitol
- Members: Fee Waybill; Prairie Prince; Roger Steen; David Medd
- Past members: Rick Anderson; Vince Welnick; Bill Spooner; Michael Cotten; Bob McIntosh; Re Styles; Mingo Lewis; Jane Dornacker; David Killingsworth; Gary Cambra
- Website: thetubes.com

The Tubes are a San Francisco-based rock band. Their self-titled 1975 debut album included the single "White Punks on Dope", while their 1983 single "She's a Beauty" was a top-10 U.S. hit and its music video was frequently played in the early days of MTV. The band also performed in the 1980 film Xanadu, singing the rock portion of the cross-genre song "Dancin'" opposite a big band.

== History ==
The Tubes formed on March 22, 1972, in San Francisco featuring members from two Phoenix bands who had moved to San Francisco in 1969. One, The Beans (alternately billing themselves as the Radar Men from Uranus), included Bill Spooner, Rick Anderson, Vince Welnick, and Bob McIntosh. The other, the Red White and Blues Band, featured Prairie Prince, Roger Steen, and David Killingsworth. After performing at Expo '70 in Japan, Killingsworth left the Red, White and Blues Band, leaving Steen and Prince to audition new bass players, albeit unsuccessfully. Before moving to San Francisco the Beans had been a local favorite in Phoenix, selling out shows with a tongue-in-cheek concept rock show called "The Mother of Ascension" featuring costumes and props. After moving, Bill Spooner worked at the Fillmore West concert hall sweeping floors in between Beans shows at the Longshoremen's Hall and other minor venues. The band's loud, heavy jamming style did not attract much attention, and the band needed to go back home to Phoenix. There they would sell out shows, which provided enough money to pay their rent. The Beans' manager and former Alice Cooper Group drummer, John Speer, suggested they add Prince and Steen along with their roadie John Waybill to one of these shows. Waybill's nickname among the band was "Fee," short for "Fiji," thanks to his copious head of hippie hair.

"The Radar Men from Uranus" played the Celebrity Theatre in Phoenix, as well as a show in Mexico where they were run out of town by the police (it was where Rick Anderson almost drowned after he was washed out to sea while swimming). The group would stick together and play shows at biker bars such as The Inn of The Beginning in Cotati, California. The vocals at the time were shared by Spooner, Steen, and Waybill as different characters. Prairie Prince and Phoenix high school friend Michael Cotten were attending art school at the San Francisco Art Institute at this time; they attracted local press attention by painting a mural of crashing waves on the side of the Cliff House Restaurant. Cotten was asked by Spooner to buy an ARP synthesizer instead of a film camera and began to perform with the band as well as create props and costumes.

One of the first Tubes shows was at the Art Institute cafeteria as part of an art show for classmate and future Hollywood director Kathryn Bigelow. While experimenting with their stage show and art, Prince and Cotten met model Re Styles while painting the Cliff House mural. Styles was born Shirley Marie Macleod on March 30, 1950, in Middelburg, Netherlands. She had appeared in both Alejandro Jodorowsky's The Holy Mountain and Sun Ra's Space Is the Place, and posed for Playboy and Penthouse magazines. By 1975 she was credited with clothing design and dance co-ordination for the band. Onstage she played Patty Hearst and dressed in wild leather outfits during the "Mondo Bondage" dance with Waybill. By 1979, she and Prince were married.

After several years of playing biker bars, the band needed help. They had a temporary agreement with producer David Rubinson and played on bills with The Pointer Sisters and Sylvester, but were still trying to find an audience. Prince had been hired by newly formed jazz-rock band Journey to record demos, and approached their manager Herbie Herbert, a former Santana roadie and Bill Graham employee. Herbert made a deal with Graham that if the Tubes could sell out three local shows, Graham would give him an opening slot on the show of his choice.

Herbert booked shows at a local club called the Village, which sold out thanks to themes inspired by the San Francisco post-hippie underground culture such as "The Streaker's Ball" and "Mondo Bondage." Much to Graham's dismay, Herbert chose an opening slot for the upcoming Led Zeppelin show at Kezar Stadium. The band pulled out the stops, including Waybill dressed as an early version of "Quay Lewd" throwing "Cocaine" (flour) and "Pills" (candy) at the crowd, who threw it back. Graham threatened Herbert saying that the band would never play in San Francisco again but calmed down and eventually fell in love with the band, booking them at Winterland and other California venues for New Year's shows and Halloween. After the 1973 Led Zeppelin show, Herbert wanted to manage the band, but Spooner and the group went with local management team Mort Moriarty and Gary Peterson, also known as "Bag O' Bucks." Moriarty was interested in the use of video in rock music and saw the Tubes' stage show as the future of music videos. Bob McIntosh died of cancer at this time, leaving Prince as the only drummer.

In 1974, Bag O' Bucks filmed a Tubes show at the California Hall and shopped the "video demo" around Los Angeles. George Daly, Columbia Records head of A&R in San Francisco, made some Tubes demos, but CBS' corporate headquarters in New York City would not agree to signing the Tubes to Columbia due to the radical nature of their art. After 18 months, with no success at his own label, Daly, at the suggestion of Rick Wakeman, finally pitched the group to competitor A&M Records, where his former Columbia East Coast A&R colleague and friend, Kip Cohen, had recently headed the A&R division. Daly personally flew managers Moriarity and Petersen to Los Angeles and Cohen signed the Tubes to A&M, a rare example of cross-company support by major label executives. Working with lawyer Greg Fischbach, the band signed with A&M Records.

=== Debut album ===
The Tubes' first album, The Tubes (1975), was produced by Al Kooper. The track "White Punks on Dope" was an "absurd anthem of wretched excess" and ridiculed the Hollywood kids of the rich and famous. Since then the song has been covered by Mötley Crüe, P.O.L. (Parade of Losers), and the German rock musician Nina Hagen, who set the tune to new lyrics (not a translation of the original lyrics), titling her work "TV-Glotzer" ("Couch Potato") and using it as the opening track of her own debut album Nina Hagen Band (1978). The album track "What Do You Want from Life?," which became another of the Tubes' signature songs, satirizes consumerism and celebrity culture and climaxes in a monolog by Waybill who, in a rapid game show announcer's patter, name-checks celebrities such as Bob Dylan, Paul Williams and Randolph Mantooth, as well as well-known products of the period, including the Dynagym exercise machine and a host of American vehicles such as "a herd of Winnebagos" and a "Mercury Montclair..." as part of a list of things that, "if you're an American citizen, you are entitled to" culminating in "a baby's arm holding an apple."

By late 1975, the band created a stage show unlike any other after hiring Kenny Ortega to direct and choreograph, comedian Jane Dornacker and her band "Leila and the Snakes," and event support/video pioneer T.J. McHose to run a live video feed with films for each song. The show was critically acclaimed and broke them into show business in Los Angeles during sold-out runs at the Roxy Theater, David Allen's Boarding House and Bimbo's in San Francisco, as well as The Bottom Line in New York City. Compared at the time to The Rocky Horror Picture Show, the Tubes' stage show was closer to Saturday Night Live with its mix of topical satire and subversive postmodern Andy Kaufman-like routines such as Waybill beating up a couple in the front row (who were planted) during the "Crime Medley," then taking off his disguise as the band launched into "Mondo Bondage" and a huge stack of "Kill Amplifiers" (cardboard) falling on Quay Lewd during the finale of "White Punks on Dope."

The band was part of the mid-'70s underground comedy scene which included The Credibility Gap, Firesign Theatre, Ace Trucking Company, Kentucky Fried Theater, Groundlings, Ken Shapiro's Channel One Video Theatre and National Lampoon. The L.A. Connection Comedy Theatre performed during the Tubes show intermission many times. In 1975, the Tubes were offered a spot on Saturday Night Live with Howard Cosell and NBC's Saturday Night, but manager Mort Moriarty wanted the band to be able to play several songs in a row to show off how tight their transitions were; both shows declined, and without major network TV appearances, the Tubes missed out on huge TV exposure, cementing their "cult" status until the early 1980s. The band's touring crew was up to 24 people at this point, making it hard to tour for the standard weeks on end to which most bands of the era were committing to build a fan base.

=== Young and Rich ===
The Tubes' second album, Young and Rich (1976) on A&M Records, was produced by Ken Scott. It featured "Don't Touch Me There," a suggestive duet between Waybill and Styles, which was arranged in classic "Wall of Sound" style by Jack Nitzsche. The song was co-written by Ron Nagle and Tubes dancer/vocalist Jane Dornacker.

The band toured America with a new stage show including new numbers "Slipped My Disco," "Madam, I'm Adam" and "Pimp." They also played several sold out nights at The Shrine in Los Angeles and Bimbo's in San Francisco. Mingo Lewis joined the band after performing several shows with them at Bimbo's.

=== Now, What Do You Want From Live, Remote Control ===
The Tubes' third album Now (1977) was an attempt to write less satirical songs with the band sharing song writing duties with Bill Spooner. It was recorded while the band was playing a special engagement on weekends at The Whisky in Los Angeles. They played a small American tour of the west coast and a month-long run at San Francisco's Palace of Fine Arts featuring the band's most elaborate stage show to date. The band had met manager Rikki Farr at a show opening for Alice Cooper. Farr fell in love with the band's stage show and agreed to manage them after they sued Bag O' Bucks to get out of their contract. Farr used his fame in England to promote them as "America's Answer to Punk."

The band created a new "best of" stage show and finally played a tour of Europe. They were banned in several towns and attracted front page press attention for their dark satirical stage show that spoofed America's consumer culture with dancers, video and sketches. They appeared on The Old Grey Whistle Test and played "God-Bird-Change" and "White Punks on Dope."

After their live record What Do You Want from Live (1978), recorded during their record-breaking run at the Hammersmith Odeon, London, England, the band toured America and played a sold-out run at The Pantages Theater in Hollywood, which attracted celebrities such as the cast of Laverne and Shirley, Cher, Kate Jackson, and Gene Simmons. The stage show had reached new levels of lewdness with Quay Lewd's large dildo hanging out of his costume and a fake bomb threat number called "The Terrorists of Rock," which caused Cher to flee the theater, believing the threat was real. She later asked the band to appear in her next TV special Cher...Special. The band went back to Europe to follow up their big splash but it was canceled after Waybill fell off stage and broke his leg at a Leicester, England show. The band returned and played the dates in the fall before headlining the Knebworth Rock Festival with Frank Zappa, Peter Gabriel and Boomtown Rats.

The fourth album for A&M, Remote Control (1979) was a concept album produced by Todd Rundgren, about a television-addicted idiot-savant, inspired by the Jerzy Kosinski novel Being There (which was later made into a movie starring Peter Sellers). The cover of Remote Control (1979) shows a baby (Rikki Farr's son) in a specially made "Vidi-Trainer" (a car seat/TV with a baby bottle nipple) created by Michael Cotten and Dave Mellot. Much of the new music was rewritten by Rundgren and the band in studio, including "Turn Me On" (formerly "Get Over It"); "The Terrorists of Rock" number was cannibalized to become "Telecide."

Waybill and Styles shared vocals on "Prime Time," although Rundgren had tried to record a version with just Styles. When Waybill found out, he demanded to sing as well. The band performed the song on Top of the Pops and on tour in Europe before cutting it from the set, due to tensions between Waybill and Styles.

Synth player and visual stylist Michael Cotten designed an innovative multimedia stage show for the "Remote Control" tour, which employed multiple TV monitors and a 35 mm film projector, which according to Cotten, cost US$12,000 (equivalent to around $50,000 in 2022). They tested it (with no dress rehearsal) at UCLA's Royce Hall, but there were multiple technical problems, including the poor visibility of the small TV screens, and synchronization problems with the film projections. The show was scrapped after Steen, Waybill and the group's management reportedly complained about the cost, and the show overtaking the music. This led to a stripped-down tour in the U.S., Japan, and Europe with Squeeze as the support act. The band also played two shows at the Greek Theatre in Los Angeles, with Yellow Magic Orchestra as support; that show was released on home video in 1982. The band held an auction of Tubes stage props and costumes in 1980 at the Boarding House before the band attempted to play as a straight rock act for several sold-out shows at The Roxy in Los Angeles.

=== Music videos ===
John Tobler said that with their media savvy and theatrical skills, the Tubes were born to create rock video but arrived several years too early. However, the band did produce at least one collection of music videos, which were issued on the 1982 RCA Capacitance Electronic Disc and Pioneer Laserdisc The Tubes Video, containing versions of twelve of the band's hits, including "White Punks on Dope," "Mondo Bondage," "Talk to Ya Later," and most of The Completion Backward Principle album, in slickly produced music videos based on the group's stage shows. It was directed by Russell Mulcahy and filmed at Shepperton Studios in Shepperton, England.

=== Stage show production pioneers ===
The Tubes put their creativity and art skills mainly into their live performances, in which songs could be full-fledged production numbers with props and costumes built at the Tubes Warehouse by the band, crew and friends. Everything was satirized, from a beach movie parody for "Sushi Girl," to leather clad S&M hijinks in "Mondo Bondage," to the game show antics of "What Do You Want from Life?" At their peak, their live act featured dozens of other performers, including tap dancers and acrobats. The Tubes' stage productions were choreographed by Kenny Ortega and featured cast members Jane Dornacker, LeRoy Jones, Michael Holman, Michael Springer, Cindi Osborn, Heline Gouax, and Mary Niland from 1975 to 1977.

From 1978 to 1979, the cast included Sharon Collins, Caty Bevan, and Loryanna Catalano. The Completion Backward tour featured Shelley Pang, Cheryl Hangland, Joey Richards, and Cynthia Rhodes. From 1983 to 1985, Michele Gray (who later married Todd Rundgren) and Cheryl Hangland were principal dancers. Several crew members—including Tour Manager Steve "Chopper" Borges, Lee Collins, and Gail Lowe — made frequent appearances on stage in various roles as well.

The Tubes' live shows in the late 1970s and early 1980s were rife with allusions to mainstream film: Dr. Strangelove (1964), Rollerball (1975), Saturday Night Fever (1977), Grease (1978)] then-forgotten B-movies [Wild Women of Wongo (1958), Attack of the 50 Foot Woman (1958)], music (Tom Jones, punk rock, a medley of Nelson Riddle television themes), contemporary pop culture (Patty Hearst, the Viking program), television (Let's Make a Deal, Fernwood 2Nite, the anime Raideen), and literature (Nelson Algren's A Walk on the Wild Side).

The shows were expensive to produce, however, and although they earned the band a reputation for being one of the most entertaining live acts of the time, by the early 1980s, they'd left the band in debt to A&M Records, even after they'd sold their song rights for tour support.

=== Dropped by A&M Records and signing with Capitol Records ===
The band's fifth studio album, the self-produced Suffer for Sound, was meant to complete the group's contract with A&M. The recession had affected the music industry, and many other bands were cut from A&M at the end of the 1970s. The band owed A&M a large amount of money and after playing the new record for Jerry Moss, Rikki Farr insulted Moss' taste in music to ensure that the band was let go and able to sign with a new label. Tubes friend Matt Leach compiled the outtakes, B-sides, and oddities collection T.R.A.S.H. (Tubes Rarities and Smash Hits) (1981). The band was signed to Capitol Records by Bruce Garfield and Bobby Colomby, toning down the X-rated sketches for the live shows and redesigning itself as a leaner ensemble with a view to release more accessible hits. The band worked with Bobby Colomby to find a new musical direction and then met with possible producers including Jeff "Skunk" Baxter before deciding on David Foster. The Tubes and David Foster recorded "Gonna Get It Next Time" for the soundtrack of Chevy Chase's "Modern Problems" directed by Ken Shapiro.

=== New label, mainstream success ===
The Completion Backward Principle (1981) was engineered by Humberto Gatica and produced by David Foster (Earth, Wind and Fire). It featured the classic rock radio staple "Talk to Ya Later," written by Waybill, Foster and Toto guitarist Steve Lukather. The songwriting credits were shared again but included input from all members, including "Attack of the 50 Foot Woman" by Prince, "Think About Me" by Cotten, "Don't Want to Wait Anymore" by Vince Welnick and "Matter of Pride" by Steen. The album was a satire of Reagan's "Morning in America" corporate movement and included pictures of the band members cleaned up and wearing suits. The band also had their first Top 40 hit in the United States in 1981, "Don't Want to Wait Anymore," with vocals by Spooner. The band returned to the road in America and Europe with a new stage show designed by Cotten, Prince, and Ortega, featuring new dancers including Cynthia Rhodes, who would leave soon after to star in Flashdance and Staying Alive. Styles was said to have left the band: Waybill said at the time that she was "going on to a Hollywood movie career or something". Styles, Cotten and Prince played as the Boring Squares in San Francisco in 1980. The trio were also said to have played a show on Bora Bora in 1984.

The single "Sports Fans" was recorded live during halftime of the legendary San Francisco 49ers "The Catch" game; Tubes crew members can be seen on the side lines in the slow motion replay.

As the band gained more mainstream popularity, Waybill auditioned for roles in Night Shift and Streets of Fire and appeared on Late Night with David Letterman twice.

Outside Inside (1983) was produced by David Foster and included the number 10 US hit "She's a Beauty." The album was recorded with several studio musicians, including members of Chicago and Toto. The slicker sound added to the tension between the "art" oriented members of the group (Cotten, Spooner and Prince) and the pop-music fans (Steen and Waybill). The band performed "The Monkey Time" on Solid Gold, and toured the United States, mostly playing theme parks like Six Flags Magic Mountain and colleges for a new generation of fans. The band filmed an hour-long concert special at the Kabuki Theatre in San Francisco which played on MTV and was directed by Jim Yukich. "She's a Beauty" won song of the year and The Tubes performed live at the BAM music awards.

=== Love Bomb and departure from Capitol Records ===
In 1984, the band teamed up with Todd Rundgren again for their eighth album, Love Bomb (1985). Tired of spending money at other recording studios, the band built their own studio with Rundgren called "Cavum Soni" and XTC recorded several tracks there with Todd for Skylarking on which also Prince played drums. Glen Tilbrook of Squeeze sings back up on "Night People." The entire recording process was video taped by a camera crew on Betamax. Bruce Garfield and Bobby Colomby were dropped by Capitol in the company-wide layoffs that took place pre-reorganization, and like many of their label mates, the Tubes were released; however that occurred just as they were going on tour in support of the album. The band found it necessary to self-finance the tour as a matter of respect to honor their commitment to their fans. Between this tour's self-financing and the band's continued self-financing of their San Francisco recording studio built in 1980, the tour left the band a half million dollars in debt, obliging them to play less expensive and smaller venues for a year to pay off their financial commitments.

During this period, the Tubes also contributed songs to several movie soundtracks, including Hardbodies, My Science Project, and Heavenly Bodies. However, the financial strain following Love Bomb proved unsustainable. By the end of 1985 the Tubes disbanded. Drummer Prairie Prince went on to join Todd Rundgren's touring band and established himself as a session musician, recording with artists such as XTC, Brian Eno, and Tom Waits.

Guitarist Bill Spooner pursued solo work, releasing the album First Chud on The Residents' record label Ralph Records. Spooner's next solo project was Mall to Mars, recorded with coproducer Jim Blake and featuring fellow Tubes member Prairie Prince on drums. The album was released on Visible Records, a label owned by longtime Tubes music publishing associate/copyright administrator Richard Kaye, and included several cover versions, among them "Theme from Star Trek" and "Dimming of the Day".

=== Waybill departs ===
Waybill released a solo album produced by David Foster (Read My Lips, Capitol Records) in 1984 and was on-camera talent for the 1985 MTV Video Awards. He also enjoyed a fruitful writing partnership with Capitol Records label mate Richard Marx, their most popular and well known collaboration being "Edge of a Broken Heart," recorded by the female band Vixen. Waybill left the Tubes in 1986.

=== Personnel changes ===
Later in the year, the remaining members of the band hired David Killingsworth, a longtime friend from Phoenix, as lead vocalist. Killingsworth had been the singer in the Red and White Blues Band with Prince and Steen. The band appeared on The Late Show Starring Joan Rivers on Fox in 1987 and played "Talk to Ya Later," a new song called "No Baby's Gonna Break My Heart," and were also interviewed.

Michael Cotten moved to New York City to pursue a career based on his artwork, stage design and production, and is considered one of the country's top production designers. In the fall of 1988, Bill Spooner traveled his final tour with the band and left in early 1989. Vince Welnick departed as well to take to the road with Todd Rundgren in 1989 and then joined the Grateful Dead in 1990. Gary Cambra joined on keyboards and guitar in 1989. He and Roger Steen took over most of the lead vocal duties after Killingsworth left in early 1990.

In 1993, Fee Waybill rejoined the band. The lineup toured Europe and released two albums, a compilation and the 1996 album Genius of America. David Medd joined in 1996 to play keyboards alongside Cambra. In 2001, the band released a live CD, The Tubes World Tour 2001, and continued to tour.

=== 2000–present ===
The band has toured the United States each year with a lineup of Waybill, Steen, Anderson, Medd, Gary Cambra and Prince. Cambra left in 2006. After a 2004 tour of the UK, the London show was released as a live album and DVD called Wild in London. On June 2, 2006, former keyboardist Vince Welnick died. In September 2007, the remaining members reunited in Phoenix for induction into the Arizona Music and Entertainment Hall Of Fame.

On April 17, 2022, Styles died at the age of 72. On December 16, 2022, Rick Anderson died at the age of 75. On January 31, 2026, it was announced that Mingo Lewis had died aged 72.

== The Tubes Project and other milestones ==
Michael Cotten began the Tubes Project in 2005, to save and digitize the band's reel to reel and video tape archive. The collection had been kept in the closet of Tubes fan club president Marilyn Wood's son after being discarded in the late 1980s. Included in the vault are full color shows taped for TV at Bimbo's in San Francisco, 1975 and Dutch VARA TV from the 1977 European tour. Over 70 interviews were conducted with band members, crew, managers, cast and colleagues such as Styles, Todd Rundgren, Al Kooper, Devo, and David Foster. Hundreds of photos were scanned and compiled from band members and fan collections for use in the hour and half documentary.

After leaving the band, Jane Dornacker performed as stand-up comedian and later worked as a traffic reporter with the team which replaced Howard Stern at WNBC. She was killed in a helicopter crash in 1986, while giving a live report. A benefit show was held for her daughter at the Warfield in San Francisco with the Tubes and Todd Rundgren.

On November 10, 2009, Mondo Birthmark, a CD of previously unreleased rarities, was released through the label Fuel 2000. The package was designed by Michael Cotten and Prairie Prince with rare photos and interviews of the group. The early demos featured the band's first drummer, Bob Macintosh.

On July 24, 2019, Kenny Ortega was awarded a star on the Hollywood Walk of Fame. Fee, Michael Cotton and Michael Holman attended the ceremony.

== Band members ==
Current members

- Prairie Prince – drums, percussion (1972–present)
- Roger Steen – guitar, vocals (1972–present)
- Fee Waybill – lead vocals, occasional guitar (1972–1986, 1993–present)
- David Medd – keyboards, vocals (1996–present)
- Atom Ellis – bass, backing vocals (substitute 2010, 2022–present)

Former members

- Rick Anderson – bass, occasional backing vocals (1972–2022; his death)
- Bill Spooner – guitar, vocals (1972–1989)
- Vince Welnick – keyboards, vocals (1972–1989; died 2006)
- Michael Cotten – synthesizer (1972–1986)
- Bob McIntosh – drums (1972–1973; his death)
- Re Styles – vocals (1975–1979; died 2022)
- Mingo Lewis – percussion, drums (1976–1979; died 2026)
- David Killingsworth – lead vocals (1986–1990)
- Gary Cambra – guitar, keyboards, vocals (1989–2006)

== Discography ==
=== Studio albums ===
Year	Album details	Peak chart positions							Certifications (sales thresholds)
Year	Album details	US	UK	GER	DUT	AUS	NZ	CAN	Certifications (sales thresholds)
1975	The Tubes: Released: June 1975; Label: A&M	113	—	—	—	—	—	—	
1976	Young and Rich: Released: April 1976; Label: A&M	46	—	—	—	55	—	75	
1977	Now: Released: May 3, 1977; Label: A&M	122	—	—	—	—	—	—	
1979	Remote Control: Released: March 1979; Label: A&M	46	40	—	46	70	—	53	
1981	The Completion Backward Principle: Released: April 6, 1981; Label: Capitol	36	—	28	—	74	4	26	CAN: Gold NZ: Gold
1983	Outside Inside: Released: April 4, 1983; Label: Capitol	18	77	44	—	—	22	27	CAN: Gold
1985	Love Bomb: Released: February 1985; Label: Capitol	87	—	59	—	—	—	98	
1996	Genius of America: Released: October 15, 1996; Label: Critique	—	—	—	—	—	—	—	
"—" denotes releases that did not chart.

=== Compilation albums ===
Year	Album details	Peak chart positions
Year	Album details	US
1981	T.R.A.S.H. (Tubes Rarities and Smash Hits): Released: November 1981; Label: A&M	148
1992	The Best of the Tubes: Released: November 17, 1992; Label: Capitol	—
2000	Millennium Collection: the Tubes: Released: October 17, 2000; Label: A&M	—
2002	Hoods from Outer Space: Released: May 22, 2002; Label: Brilliant	—
2003	White Punks on Dope: Released: November 24, 2003; Label: Acadia Records; Budget re-release of The Tubes and Young and Rich	—
2008	Goin' Down the Tubes: Released: June 10, 2008; Label: Cherry Red	—
2009	Mondo Birthmark: Released: November 10, 2009; Label: Fuel; Rarities and demos	—

=== Live albums ===
Year	Album details	Peak chart positions			
Year	Album details	US	UK	AUS	CAN
1978	What Do You Want from Live: Released: February 1978; Label: A&M	82	38	87	75
2001	The Tubes World Tour 2001 (live): Released: October 10, 2000; Label: CMC	—	—	—	—
2005	Wild in London: Released: October 2, 2006; Label: Snapper	—	—	—	—
2006	Alive in America: Released: '76 live broadcast from LA Shrine; Label: (unsanctioned) Renaissance	—	—	—	—
2017	Live at German Television: The Musikladen Concert 1981: Released: '81 live broadcast from Musikladen; Label: Sireena Records (SIR4041 2LP)	—	—	—	—
2020	Live in San Francisco: Released: '83 live broadcast from Kabuki Theater; Label: Notlob (unsanctioned)	—	—	—	—
2020	The Fantastic Live Delusion: (Double disc set with two shows from FM broadcasts including 1983 Kabuki Theater show); Label: FM In Concert	—	—	—	—

=== Singles ===
Year	Song	Peak chart positions						Album
Year	Song	US	US Main. Rock	UK	AUS	NZ	CAN	Album
1975	"White Punks on Dope"	—	—	28	—	—	—	The Tubes
1976	"Don't Touch Me There"	61	—	—	26	—	86	Young and Rich
1979	"Prime Time"	—	—	34	49	—	—	Remote Control
1981	"Don't Want to Wait Anymore"	35	22	60	36	—	—	The Completion Backward Principle
1981	"Talk to Ya Later"	101	7	—	—	—	—	The Completion Backward Principle
1982	"Sports Fans"	—	—	—	—	—	—	Non-album single
1983	"She's a Beauty"	10	1	79	—	37	18	Outside Inside
1983	"Tip of My Tongue"	52	—	—	—	—	—	Outside Inside
1983	"The Monkey Time"	68	16	—	—	—	—	Outside Inside
1985	"Piece by Piece"	87	25	—	—	—	—	Love Bomb
"—" denotes releases that did not chart.

=== Video albums ===
Year	Video details
1981	The Tubes Video: Released: November 15, 1981; Label: Thorn EMI Video (Betamax and VHS), Pioneer Artists (LaserDisc), RCA Corporation (CED); Format: Betamax, VHS, LaserDisc, CED; Nominated for a Grammy
1982	The Tubes: Live at the Greek: Released: November 1982; Label: Monterey Home Video; Format: Betamax, VHS
2016	The Tubes: German TV 1981: Released: October 2016; Label: MVD; Format: DVD
