= Kip Cohen =

American entertainment and record company executive

- Born: Cleveland, Ohio, U.S.
- Education: Carnegie Mellon University College of Fine Arts
- Occupations: Music industry executive, theatre production manager
- Years active: 1960s–present
- Known for: Manager of Fillmore East; Executive roles at Columbia Records, A&M Records, and the Herb Alpert Foundation

Kip Cohen is an American entertainment and record company executive who once held positions at the Fillmore East, Columbia Records and the Herb Alpert Foundation.

== Career ==
In 1964 Cohen was the theater production manager for The Committee and The Passion of Josef D. He later formed a company called, Sensefex, Inc. and managed the Fillmore East music venue in New York City from 1968 to 1971. Cohen then took a position as head of A&R for Columbia Records before moving to A&M Records as Vice President of A&R (1973-1979). In 1985 Cohen became the manager at the Wiltern Theater which was operated as part of the company, Bill Graham Presents. Cohen was also the president of the Herb Alpert Foundation for 17 years.
