= Re Styles =

American singer, designer and actress (1950–2022)

Re Styles (born Shirley Marie Macleod; March 3, 1950 – April 17, 2022) was an American singer, designer and actor best known as a member of The Tubes.

Styles has been said to have been born in either The Netherlands or in Fort Campbell, Kentucky, U.S.A. Her parents were Duncan A. Macleod and Shirley L. Macleod; her father died fighting in Korea in 1951.

Styles grew up in Seattle, attending Nathan Hale High School and moved to San Francisco in 1968. She worked as a model, appearing in fashion spreads for the Macy's department store and the magazine Vogue. In the early 1970s she worked as an actor, including the role of "Klen's Lover" in Alejandro Jodorowsky’s 1973 film The Holy Mountain, for which she used the name 'Re Debris'. She is also rumoured to be in the cast of Sun Ra's 1974 film Space is the Place. She may also have appeared in magazines such as Playboy and Oui; sources differ on whether this occurred before or during her time in The Tubes.

She met The Tubes in 1975; the group had just completed its debut album. She became their costume designer, and then danced onstage at their live shows, and also became the band's co-lead vocalist alongside Fee Waybill. She also entered into a relationship with the band's drummer Prairie Prince.

Jane Dornacker, who also toured with The Tubes at this time, co-wrote the group's first hit single, "Don't Touch Me There", which was recorded as a duet between Styles and Waybill. "Prime Time", from the fourth Tubes album Remote Control was also similarly a duet.

Styles was a prominent member of The Tubes when the group appeared in the 1980 film Xanadu however she left shortly afterwards. Waybill later told Classic Rock magazine that by this time Styles was 'in bad shape... she didn't really want to tour anymore. So she kind of left the band at that point... She was really a talented girl.'

Following her time in The Tubes, Styles worked as a landscape gardener in Seattle, as well as a home remodeller, party planner, and flower arranger. She died in her sleep following a stroke.
