= Fee Waybill =

American musician (born 1950)

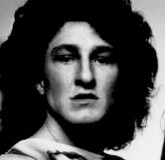
- Waybill in 1977

Background information
- Born: John Waldo Waybill; September 17, 1950 (age 75); Omaha, Nebraska, U.S.
- Genres: Rock, glam rock
- Occupations: Musician, producer
- Instruments: Vocals, guitar
- Formerly of: The Tubes, Toto
- Website: www.thetubes.com

John Waldo "Fee" Waybill (born September 17, 1950) is an American singer, guitarist, songwriter and record producer. He is the lead singer and songwriter of San Francisco rock band The Tubes. Waybill has also worked with other acts, including Toto, Richard Marx, and Billy Sherwood.

== Early life and education ==
Waybill moved to Scottsdale, Arizona, in the 1950s and grew up in the Southwest Village area. He then attended Arizona State University, where he had planned to study oceanography. Ultimately, he discovered acting and decided to pursue that as a field of study. Waybill eventually dropped out of college and, while hanging out in the Verde Valley of Arizona, got to know his future bandmates, Roger Steen and Prairie Prince.

== Career ==
Waybill, along with the Tubes, appeared in Robert Greenwald's Xanadu (1980), and Lou Adler's Ladies and Gentlemen, The Fabulous Stains (1982). In the latter film, he played the character Lou Corpse, the washed-up frontman of a band called the Metal Corpses. In 1984, a year after the Tubes released one of their most successful albums, Waybill released his first solo album called Read My Lips. In 1996, Waybill released another album called Don't Be Scared By These Hands.

With the Tubes, Waybill performed as crippled Nazi Dr. Strangekiss, country singer Hugh Heifer, glam rocker Quay Lewd, and punk parody Johnny Bugger.

During the early 1980s, Waybill appeared as himself on a short-lived television program called Rock 'N' America, usually performing as a street reporter who annoyed pedestrians with nonsensical interviews. He also made a cameo in Bill & Ted's Excellent Adventure as one of "The Three Most Important People in the World", and appeared, both acting and performing with The Tubes, in one of the "Fishin' Musician" skits on Second City TV.

In addition to his work with the Tubes, Waybill now works as a record producer. He was the producer for a number of pop music artists including singer-songwriter Richard Marx.

== Personal life ==
Waybill and his wife, Elizabeth, live in Los Angeles' Hollywood Hills area.

== Discography ==
=== Studio albums ===
- Read My Lips (1984)
- Don't Be Scared by These Hands (1996)
- Fee Waybill Rides Again (2020)

=== with The Tubes ===
- The Tubes (1975)
- Young and Rich (1976)
- Now (1977)
- What Do You Want From Live (1978)
- Remote Control (1979)
- The Completion Backward Principle (1981)
- Outside Inside (1983)
- Love Bomb (1985)
- Genius of America (1996)
- Tubes World Tour 2001 (2001)
- Wild in London (2005)
- Mondo Birthmark (2009)

=== Singles ===
- "You're Still Laughing" (1984)
- "I Don't Even Know Your Name (Passion Play)" (1984)
- "Meeting Half the Way" (1990)
- "Faker" (2020)

=== Soundtrack appearances ===
- "You're Still Laughing" & "Saved My Life" (from St. Elmo's Fire) (1985)
- "Running Scared" (from Running Scared) (1986)
- "You'd Better Wait" (from Dream a Little Dream) (1989)
