= Jane Dornacker =

American musician, entertainer, and reporter (1947–1986)

Jane Carroll Dornacker
- Born: October 1, 1947; Albuquerque, New Mexico, U.S.
- Died: October 22, 1986 (aged 39); Manhattan, New York City, U.S.
- Cause of death: Helicopter crash
- Occupations: Musician, comedian, traffic reporter
- Spouse: Bob Knickerbocker (divorced)
- Children: 1 daughter
- Father: John L. Dornacker

Jane Carroll Dornacker (October 1, 1947 – October 22, 1986) was an American rock musician, comedian and traffic reporter. She gained fame as an associate songwriter for the San Francisco rock band The Tubes; she also led her own band, Leila and the Snakes.

== Career ==
Dornacker was born in Albuquerque, New Mexico, the daughter of John L. Dornacker. Her family lived at 1701 Las Lomas Road, NE Albuquerque, in a house built in 1928 by her grandfather, Dr Edward C. Matthews, a physician. She had two sisters, Ann and Mary. She was a performer from a young age, and wrote a six-act play while she was in Monte Vista Elementary School; at 8, she sang all the parts in an opera of her own composition "in a language no one could understand".

In her late high school years, Dornacker was a featured performer in a number of local Albuquerque dramatic productions. In March 1964 she played Sophie in Jerome Kern's Roberta; in August she appeared in Maxwell Anderson's The Bad Seed and in October, she played Christina in Sidney Howard's play The Silver Cord.

In 1965 Dornacker moved to San Francisco and in the same year vied to become San Francisco State University's Homecoming Queen. Her campaign saw her riding a bicycle enclosed in a cage; she described herself as an 'Earth Mother' and declared that she was magic. Although she won election to the position, she withdrew stating that she 'didn't want the responsibility'. She did not pursue her college degree beyond this first year.

She married Bob Knickerbocker, whom she had met at university, and their daughter Naomi was born in 1969. They divorced after eight years of marriage; Knickerbocker died of a heart attack in July 1986.

=== Music ===
Dornacker was the lead singer ('Leila'), keyboardist, and songwriter of the 1970s/1980s San Francisco "tack" rock group Leila and the Snakes. Pearl E. Gates and Pamela Wood provided supporting vocals. Their repertoire included "Rock and Roll Weirdos," "Pyramid Power" and a spoof version of Peggy Lee's "Is That All There Is?". Dornacker described the group as closer to musical theatre than rock music: "I worked with a couple of girls I knew from dance classes, and we did nutty dance routines and songs, and I did these long, rambling monologues.' Gates and the band became Pearl Harbor and the Explosions without Dornacker. Guitarist Miles Corbin formed the surf instrumental band the Aqua Velvets.

Dornacker came to the attention of Bill Spooner of The Tubes when he came to see Leila and the Snakes, and he asked her to be a part of the group's live show. "For a better part of two years," she later recalled, "I was out on the road with them." She toured with The Tubes as backing singer and dancer. She co-wrote the song "Don't Touch Me There" for the group with the ceramicist and musician Ron Nagle. The song was sung by Re Styles and appeared on The Tubes' second studio album, Young and Rich (1976), and was released as a 7" single. "Cathy's Clone", written entirely by Dornacker, appears on the third Tubes album, Now.

Dornacker also provided lead vocals on "Christopher Columbus" (1978), a song by R. Crumb & His Cheap Suit Serenaders.

Other groups Dornacker formed included Jane Door and the Door Knockers and The Final Solution.

=== Acting ===
Dornacker built on her early experience as an actress throughout her career, notably in works by Sam Shepard including the 1977 jazz opera Inacoma at San Francisco's Magic Theatre. She was featured in, and created, other works for the Overtone Theater including Jane Door and the Five or Four Children, which was staged in October 1980 alongside work by two men who were important to her career: Shepard, creator of a "percussion event", and Wes "Scoop" Nisker's The Last News Show. She also appeared in The Stand-Up, Anita Sperm and as Nurse Murch in the film The Right Stuff, which also had Shepard in the cast.

=== Stand-up comedy and radio ===
Dornacker's music and acting had long had a comedic element. She developed a career as a stand-up comic in San Francisco. In 1979, she told journalist Leslie Goldberg: "To me, the funniest things are visual things. Like Jonathan Winters. I mean it doesn't matter, even if it's a bad script or if it's a Cheetos commercial, he's always funny. He just is."

She gained some success in stand-up and was a notable comedian in San Francisco in the early 1980s. In 1982, along with Kit Hollerbach, Nora Dunn, Susan Healy, Paula Poundstone and the improv group Femprov, she participated in a benefit for Big Sisters Friday at Great American Music Hall in San Francisco. She also cohosted a television show with Wes "Scoop" Nisker, Video West, on channel 26 (KTSF) on Wednesday and Saturday nights in 1979. Dornacker and Nisker were the MCs for the Bay Area Theater Critics' Circle Awards in May, 1983.

Dornacker's work as a traffic reporter in the early 1980s emerged from her media work with Nisker. She was initially employed in this role by KFRC, a popular Top 40 radio station. She worked with Don Rose, who was that station's morning disc jockey at the time. She was noted for her exceptionally fast speech, so fast it required concentration to understand her. As she did traffic, she would tell her daughter Naomi to get up and get to school.

She moved to New York City to become a much-loved, raspy-voiced "trafficologist”.

== Death and aftermath ==
Dornacker was aboard during two unrelated crashes of the helicopters leased to WNBC Radio, approximately six months apart. She survived the first crash, on April 18, 1986, but died in the second.

On October 22, 1986, Dornacker was giving one of the station's N-Copter traffic reports during the Joey Reynolds Show on WNBC in New York City. At 4:44 p.m., the Enstrom F-28 helicopter she was aboard plunged into the Hudson River from an altitude of roughly 75 feet (23 m). Her last words were, "Hit the water, hit the water, hit the water!" The F-28 helicopter nose-dived, struck the top of a chain link fence at a river pier, crashed into the Hudson River very near to the Manhattan shore and sank in 15 to 20 feet (5 to 6 m) of water. Both occupants were trapped for nearly 10–15 minutes before help arrived. Dornacker died on her way to Saint Vincent's Catholic Medical Center. Pilot Bill Pate, the only other occupant, was severely injured but survived.

In the subsequent investigation, the NTSB found that the sprag clutch that was installed in the helicopter, which was on lease to WNBC Radio by Spectrum Helicopters of Ridgefield Park, New Jersey, was a military surplus part that was not designed for use in a civilian aircraft, and that the part had not been adequately lubricated. It directly led to a mid-air seizure of the main rotor blades.

Dornacker's 16-year-old daughter, Naomi, was orphaned, having lost her father, Bob Knickerbocker, three months earlier. Naomi received $325,000 in a settlement with owner Spectrum Helicopters of Ridgefield Park, New Jersey, and the maker of the helicopter.

Shortly after the incident, several on-air interviews with WNBC Radio staff described the incident and their feelings in detail, including how other news organizations "pumped news" into the WNBC Radio newsroom as they were all in shock. Joey Reynolds broke down on-air when talking about Dornacker's daughter. WNBC played other interviews with friends and recordings of Dornacker talking about the first helicopter crash earlier that same year. Her music was also played during these tribute shows, including "Don't Touch Me There", which she had co-written for The Tubes.

A memorial concert in celebration of Dornacker took place at The Warfield Theatre in San Francisco on Saturday, November 22, 1986, with performers including Jerry Garcia, The Tubes, Bobcat Goldthwait, Jeremy Kramer, Sluts a Go Go, Carol Doda and Dennis Quaid.

A memorial to Dornacker is located in Wayne, New Jersey, where she was living at the time of her death.
