= Bill Spooner =

American musician

- Born: William Spooner; August 16, 1949 (age 76); Phoenix, Arizona, U.S.
- Genres: Rock
- Occupations: Musician, songwriter
- Instrument: Guitar
- Formerly of: The Tubes

William "Sputnik" Spooner (born August 16, 1949) is an American musician, guitarist, singer and songwriter, and the founder of The Tubes, a theatrical rock band. His songwriting is known for its use of humor and satire. He has released three solo albums: First Chud (1985), Mall to Mars (1997), and Demo-licious. He previously played in the San Francisco Bay area with the band The Folk Ups, and now plays as a solo artiste or in sessions with his son Boone. He is still recording.

== Biography and music career ==
Spooner was born and raised in Arizona with a few years spent in Lubbock, Texas. His family later moved back to Arizona, to Phoenix, where he began to play guitar. His first band was the XLs, a Beatles cover band. A band he started subsequently, the Beans, moved to San Francisco in 1970. Shortly after arriving the Beans merged with another group, the Red, White and Blues Band, to become the Tubes. He was guitarist, vocalist and principal songwriter for this group, known for their theatrical stage performances. The Tubes became a successful local and eventually nationally known band, and had a series of bestselling albums and hit singles in the late 1970s and early 80s.

"I was writing songs to illustrate outrageous characters concocted by Michael Cotten, Prairie Prince and myself. I was (am) really surprised some people consider these songs ("White Punks on Dope," "Mondo Bondage," "What Do You Want From Life?") classics. I'm not complaining...just mystified..." states Spooner.

Spooner left the Tubes for their temporary disbanding in 1985 and subsequently released his debut solo album, First Chud. After rejoining when the Tubes regrouped shortly thereafter, he would again leave the group in 1989.

Spooner then experimented with several bands, including the Sponge Mummies a satirical anti-environmental group, and SNAFU, a "paramilitary" rock band. Neither was very successful, although he began writing again during this period. Some of the songs appeared on the 1996 release Mall to Mars originally released on Visible Records, then on RDK Records. The record had outer space as a theme.

In 1998 Spooner teamed up with Alex Guinness to form the acoustic rock-folk group The Folk-Ups. They later added upright bassist Mark Skowronek. They performed at Bay Area clubs such as Slim's, Noe Valley Ministry, Cafe Amsterdam, and the Sweetwater. The Folk-Ups have opened for Dave Davies of The Kinks and Freedy Johnston.

== Personal life ==
Spooner is married to Anna. Spooner's son, Boone Spooner, is a music producer, engineer, songwriter and drummer. His daughter, Nicole Spooner, is a registered nurse and professional dog walker.
