= Prairie Prince =

American drummer (born 1950)

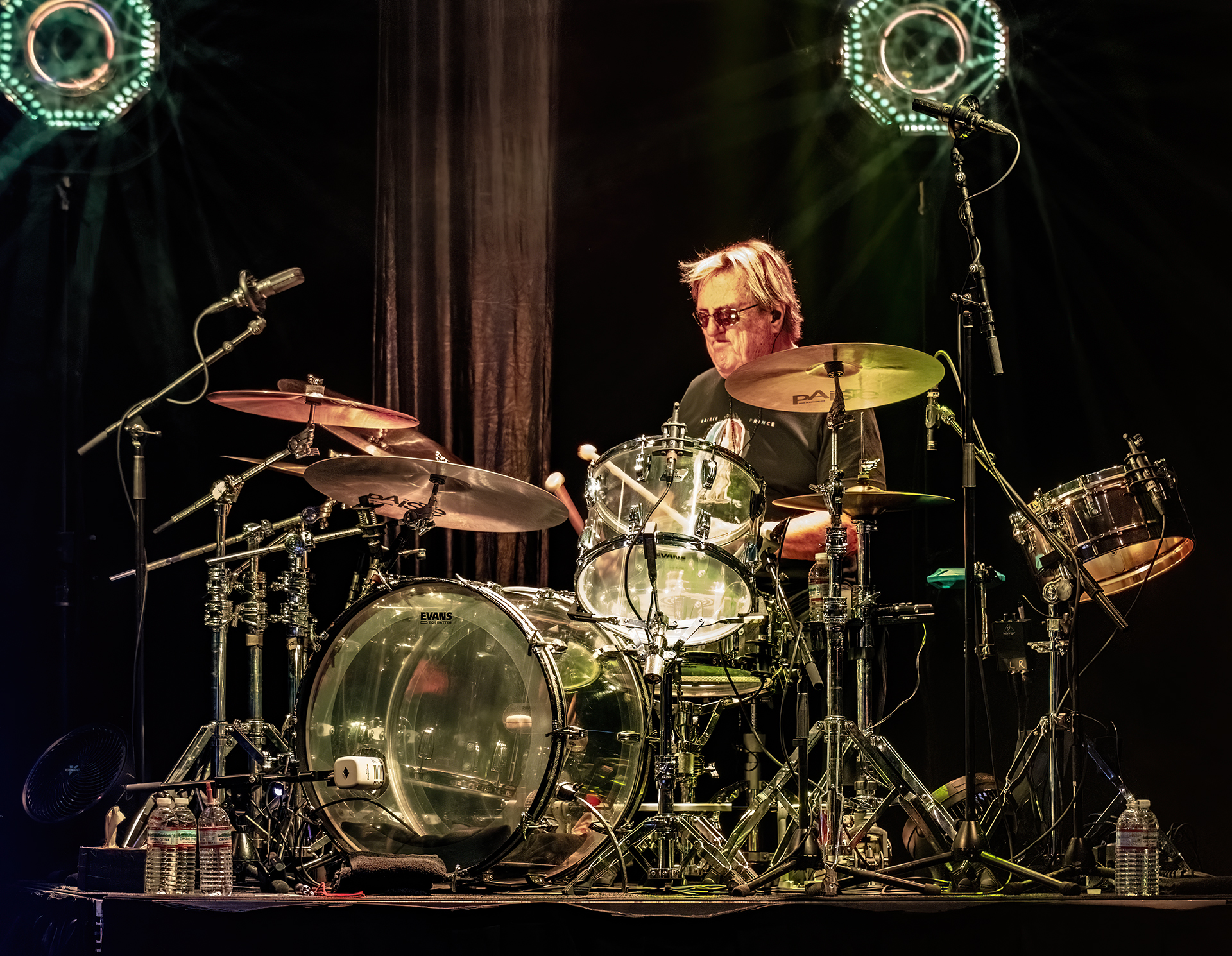
- Prince in 2016

Background information
- Born: Charles Lempriere Prince; May 7, 1950 (age 76); Charlotte, North Carolina, U.S.
- Genre: Rock
- Occupation: Drummer
- Years active: 1970s–present
- Member of: The Tubes
- Formerly of: Journey; Todd Rundgren; Jefferson Starship; The New Cars; Neil Hamburger; Richard Marx
- Website: prairieprince.com

Charles Lempriere "Prairie" Prince Jr. (born May 7, 1950) is an American drummer and visual artist. He came to prominence in the 1970s as a member of the San Francisco-based rock group the Tubes, was a member of Jefferson Starship from 1992 to 2008 and has worked with a wide range of other performers as a session musician.

== Early life ==
Charles Lempriere Prince was born in Charlotte, North Carolina and grew up in Arizona. His mother, Louise, was an artist. His father, Charles, played snare drum in high school. He has two older sisters, who gave him "a constant source of musical influences, including swing, jazz, blues, and early rock and roll".

When Prince was three years old, he banged his hands on the side of the washing machine, and by the time he was five or six was given a pair of bongos. In the third or fourth grade he got his first snare drum, joined his school band.

His drumming influences include Gene Krupa, Buddy Rich, Stevie Wonder, Clyde Stubblefield, Sandy Nelson, Dick Dale, Ringo Starr, Charlie Watts, Mitch Mitchell, Keith Moon, Ginger Baker, John Bonham, John French, Billy Cobham, Lenny White, and Jack DeJohnette.

== Career ==
=== Performing ===
In 1972, he travelled to England to record drums for Nicky Hopkins' solo album The Tin Man Was a Dreamer.

Prince is a member of the Tubes and was a founding member of Journey along with Neal Schon and Gregg Rolie. However, he quit Journey after a few months before they made any recordings.

In 1974, he was introduced to the newly made Yamaha Drums by Takashi "Hagi" Hagiwara, and has since endorsed the manufacturer.

He has subsequently worked with Chris Isaak (on his first four albums), Todd Rundgren, Brian Eno, David Byrne, XTC, Tom Waits, Paul Kantner, George Harrison, Dick Dale, Glenn Frey, Richard Marx, Bill Spooner, Neil Hamburger, John Fogerty, Nicky Hopkins, Tommy Bolin, Phil Lesh, Chris von Sneidern, John Ferenzik, Singer at Large Johnny J. Blair, The Gilmour Project, Negativland and former Tubes and Grateful Dead keyboardist Vince Welnick.

Prince collaborated with Ross Valory, bassist and founding member of Journey, on a line of patented eco-friendly, US-made hoodie shirts called MouthMan, where graphic designs of jaws and teeth on the sleeves form a mouth when the wearer "hugs himself".

He was an original member of the reformed Jefferson Starship, known as "Jefferson Starship – The Next Generation" in 1992 and appears on both that band's studio albums (the 1999 release Windows of Heaven and the 2008 release, Jefferson's Tree of Liberty), along with numerous live albums. Prince announced in early 2008 that he was leaving the band on amicable terms and remains available for international performances.

In 2006, he toured with The New Cars including Todd Rundgren, bassist Kasim Sulton (Rundgren's Utopia bandmate), and original The Cars guitarist Elliot Easton and keyboardist Greg Hawkes.

Prince is a session musician and played drums and percussion on all tracks of Chuck Prophet's 2012 release Temple Beautiful and seven of 12 tracks on Prophet's 2014's Night Surfer.

He continues to play with The Tubes and Todd Rundgren. On March 20, 2026, Prince released his first solo album, Colours and Passions.

=== Artwork ===
As an artist he designed the album cover artwork for many artists including The Tubes, Todd Rundgren (1981 album Healing), Journey, Lyle Workman and Vince Welnick's 1998 album Missing Man Formation, among many others. Along with his creative partner and fellow former Tube Michael Cotten, he has created numerous set designs for major artists including Michael Jackson, Billy Joel, Bette Midler, N'Sync, Shania Twain, Styx, The Tubes and Todd Rundgren.

Prince and Cotten have teamed up with choreographer Kenny Ortega on several special events including the 1996 Summer Olympics in Atlanta, the Super Bowl XXX halftime show (which featured Diana Ross singing "Take Me Higher" as she was lifted from the field in a helicopter), Michael Jackson's "This is It" concert, and Shania Twain's residency, Shania: Still the One, at Caesars Palace in Las Vegas, Nevada. Cotten/Prince released a book with most of their works between 1969 to 2019.

== Personal life ==
Prince lived with fellow Tubes member Re Styles from 1973 until the early 1990s. In a 2006 interview with Modern Drummer magazine's Billy Amendola, he referred to singer Diana Mangano as his wife, adding they were not formally married but had been together for a decade.

The nickname "Prairie" is based on a mispronunciation of his middle name Lempriere, originating from his father's childhood nanny (the drummer and his father share the same name).

== Band history ==
- The Tubes (1972 – present)
- Journey (1973 – January 1974)
- Jefferson Starship (January 1992 – early 2008)
- Phil Lesh and Friends (June 4–5 1999)
- The New Cars (2005 – September 2007)
- Blue Cheer (October 29, 2005)
- Quicksilver Messenger Service (2006 – 2008)
- Todd Rundgren backing drummer (2007 – present)
- Utopia (2009)

== See also ==
- The Nuclear Beauty Parlor§Activities

Preceded by none	Journey drummer 1973	Succeeded by Aynsley Dunbar
