= Don't Want to Wait Anymore =

Single by The Tubes

from the album The Completion Backward Principle
- B-side: "Think About Me"
- Released: June 1981 (U.S.)
- Recorded: August 1980
- Length: 3:50 (single version); 4:18 (album version)
- Label: Capitol
- Songwriter(s): Tubes, David Foster
- Producer(s): David Foster

The Tubes singles chronology
"Prime Time" (1981)	"Don't Want to Wait Anymore" (1981)	"Talk to Ya Later" (1981)

"Don't Want to Wait Anymore" is a song recorded by American rock band The Tubes in 1980. It was the lead single from their fifth studio LP, The Completion Backward Principle. Unlike most of their songs which typically feature Fee Waybill, lead vocals are provided by Bill Spooner, the lead guitarist.

"Don't Want to Wait Anymore" reached the Top 40 in the United States and Australia in the summer of 1981. It was also a minor hit in the United Kingdom.

== Chart history ==
Chart (1981)	Peak position
Australia (Kent Music Report)	36
UK Singles (OCC)	60
US Billboard Hot 100	35
US Billboard Mainstream Rock	22
US Cash Box Top 100	35
