= She's a Beauty =

Single by the Tubes

from the album Outside Inside
- B-side: "When You're Ready to Come"
- Released: April 1, 1983
- Recorded: 1982
- Genre: Power pop; hard rock; new wave; synth-rock
- Length: 3:25 (Single Version); 3:58 (Album Version)
- Label: Capitol
- Songwriters: Fee Waybill; David Foster; Steve Lukather
- Producer: David Foster

The Tubes singles chronology
"The Monkey Time" (1983)	"She's a Beauty" (1983)	"Tip of My Tongue" (1983)

Music video
- "She's a Beauty" on YouTube

"She's a Beauty" is a song by American rock band the Tubes, released in 1983 on their album Outside Inside. Co-written by vocalist Fee Waybill, producer David Foster and guest guitarist Steve Lukather, the song was inspired by Waybill's experience in a red light district in San Francisco. The music was largely written by Foster, who also created the song's title.

When released as a single, "She's a Beauty" became the band's biggest chart hit. It went to number 10 on the US Billboard Hot 100 and number one on the Mainstream Rock Tracks chart. The release was boosted by a popular music video, featuring a boy riding a carnival ride with Waybill portraying a carnival barker.

== Background ==
"She's a Beauty" was co-written by Fee Waybill, producer David Foster and Steve Lukather. Drummer Prairie Prince attributed the song's lyrics to Waybill and the music to Foster. Waybill says the song was originally inspired when he passed a booth on a San Francisco street outside a peep show, the booth being marked with a sign reading "Pay A Dollar, Talk to a Naked Girl," and the frustrating conversation that ensued between him and the woman inside the booth. Waybill explained:

"She's A Beauty" did actually come from a real experience. I lived in San Francisco, and there was a red-light district downtown. It was called the Tenderloin, and it was where there were seedy clubs, bars, prostitutes... it was the underbelly of San Francisco. I can't remember why I was there - I wasn't going to a massage parlor or anything. Maybe I was going downtown to Macy's or something like that. But in front of massage parlors and houses of prostitution, they used to have these little kiosks. Out in front of this one massage parlor there was a kiosk that was like a phone booth. It was enclosed, and the sign said, "PAY A DOLLAR, TALK TO A NAKED GIRL."

It was supposed to arouse you so you would go into the "happy ending" type of massage parlor. It had been there for years, and I'd never done anything like that before, but for some reason, I went up to it and put a dollar in the thing because I was curious. You put a dollar in, the wall slides down, and there is a girl in there who is scantily clad. She starts disrobing, at the same time talking about, "Hey baby, come on in. We'll take care of you." I was such a rube and so naïve. It was this gorgeous girl, and I'm going, "What are you doing this for? You're so gorgeous, why are you doing this? You could be a model." She completely ignored whatever I said and kept giving her speech, her spiel. "Yeah, come on honey, come in." Before she would actually take anything off, the thing would come down again, and it was, "Pay another dollar." So, I put in another dollar!

We were looking for new Tubes dancers because we had lost our dancers between the last album and this one, so I kept saying, "You can be a dancer in The Tubes. Can you dance? Can you sing?" And she just completely ignored me.

Originally, the chorus was intended to include the line "You can talk to a naked girl," but producer David Foster convinced Waybill to change the lyric to the less salacious "You can talk to a pretty girl." Foster was also the source for the song's title, which Waybill said was a Canadian phrase Foster often said during the recording session to indicate approval or pay a compliment.

== Release ==
"She's a Beauty" was released as the debut single from the band's 1983 album, Outside Inside, with the non-album track "When You're Ready to Come" on the B-side. Continuing the more pop friendly direction of the band's previous album, the song became the band's biggest chart hit. The single reached number 10 in the US and topped the Billboard rock charts. Drummer Prairie Prince said of this pop success, "Well I guess you could say [it was] more commercial. I mean it's not something that we never wanted to do in the past–it's just something that never really happened for us before. David Foster we owe a lot to, because he's got that ear for a hit."

== Music video ==
The popularity of "She's a Beauty" was largely driven by a narrative music video that became a staple of then-fledgling MTV. This video was directed by Kenny Ortega, also the choreographer of The Tubes' stage shows. Ortega achieved greater success choreographing movies such as Dirty Dancing and Ferris Bueller's Day Off, and as a director with High School Musical and its sequels.

Initially, the music video was intended to feature a version of a freak show based on the film Freaks; this was ultimately rejected by the record company as "too weird," so the band instead came up with the idea of the carnival ride. Other ideas were also blocked by the record company; Waybill recalled, "They constantly censored us...We had a topless mermaid, and of course, that was right out - we had to change that, and a bunch of stuff. It was just a little too weird for MTV. We had a great big paper breast - a big screen with an air-brushed breast on it. And the guy in the ride for 'She's a Beauty' would go crashing through it. Well, that was too weird, and they had to kind of soft-focus that whole thing, so it looked like a big fuzzy ball."

Waybill plays a carnival barker, a role he would reprise in live renditions of the song. He takes money from a young boy who then rides a carnival car through hallucinogenic scenes of a mermaid, female trapeze artist, prehistoric women dressed in furs, and others. The recurring theme is that he is attracted but is unable to reach them. At the end of the video we see the boy exiting the ride aged to an old man, the message apparently being the financial and emotional cost of falling in love with but being unable to obtain his heart's desire.

The role of the young boy was the first acting job for 13-year-old Alexis Arquette (then known as Robert Arquette).

== Charts ==
=== Weekly charts ===
Chart (1983)	Peak position
Canada (The Record)	16
Canada (RPM)	18
New Zealand (RIANZ)	37
UK Singles Chart (Official Charts Company)	79
US Billboard Hot 100	10
US Top Rock Tracks (Billboard)	1

=== Year-end charts ===
Chart (1983)	Position
US Billboard Hot 100	58

== See also ==
- List of Billboard Mainstream Rock number-one songs of the 1980s
