= The Completion Backward Principle =

Studio album by the Tubes
- Released: April 6, 1981
- Studio: Davlen Studios (North Hollywood); Monterey Studios (Glendale); Goodnight LA (Van Nuys)
- Genre: Rock
- Length: 39:30
- Label: Capitol
- Producer: David Foster

The Tubes chronology
T.R.A.S.H. (Tubes Rarities and Smash Hits) (1979)	The Completion Backward Principle (1981)	Outside Inside (1983)

Singles from The Completion Backward Principle
- 1. "Don't Want to Wait Anymore" Released: June 1981; 2. "Talk to Ya Later" Released: 1981

The Completion Backward Principle is the fifth studio album by the American rock band the Tubes. It is the group's first for Capitol Records. It was accompanied by a long-form music video release of the same name, although it did not contain all of the songs from the album. It is a concept album presented as a motivational business document. The album contains two hit singles, "Don't Want to Wait Anymore" and "Talk to Ya Later."

== Background ==
After the release of their fourth studio album, Remote Control, and after their time filming and recording for Xanadu and its soundtrack, the Tubes found themselves dropped by record label A&M. The group spent much of 1980 searching for a new label, eventually finding Capitol Records through Bobby Colomby of Blood, Sweat, & Tears. Reportedly, their three-album contract with Capitol allowed the label to drop the Tubes if any of the three records were not commercially successful. Colomby claimed the band needed a new producer in order to achieve the commercial success they had been looking for, and eventually introduced the group to David Foster. Foster, who had just come off of Earth, Wind & Fire's I Am, agreed to produce the group. Some time after this, lead vocalist Fee Waybill alleges that he discovered a spoken-word motivational record from the 1950s in a record store, and used the sales pitch as the central concept to the band's next album. “The sales technique was that ‘imagination creates reality,’ which it turns out, was a metaphor for someone like me, who grew up singing Beatles songs around the house dying to be in a band,” Waybill said in later interviews. The 2011 remaster liner notes claim keyboardist Michael Cotten instead found the record.

== Recording ==
In the liner notes of the 2011 remaster, Brett Milano asserts that the band's approach to recording was "to make an album of memorable stand-alone songs; not a soundtrack for the live show." Foster would often have input on the sound of the band's tracks, resulting in co-writing credits for "Amnesia", "Don't Want To Wait Anymore", and "Let's Make Some Noise". Foster also had control over what songs were and weren't on the album, opting to cut the track "Sports Fans" among others (which would later become a live staple before being included on the 2011 remaster). As well, Foster oversaw the recording process meticulously. Whereas Rundgren allowed the band to use as many takes as they needed, Foster reportedly demanded near-perfection from the group's performances. Notorious for sending band musicians home and replacing them with session musicians if they couldn't perform to his level, Foster initially included additional backup singers, such as Colomby and Bill Champlin.

Notable in the album's track list is "Mr. Hate", a track inspired heavily by then-alleged murderer Mark McDermand. The track was written during a time when McDermand seemed to be an innocent man, and as such the lyrics paint the character as an anti-hero as opposed to an outright villain. By 1984, McDermand had been convicted of two counts of murder. The song's name comes from a note found at the scene of the crime for which McDermand was convicted, signed "Mr. Hate."

Upon what would have been the conclusion of the recording sessions at Record One studios, Foster felt as if the album lacked a true single. The band initially suggested "Let's Make Some Noise" and "What's Wrong With Me", but Foster instead relegated the tracks to an album cut and a B-side, respectively. Foster instead brought in Steve Lukather, guitarist for Toto. Lukather, Foster, Waybill, and the Tubes' drummer Prairie Prince reportedly recorded "Talk to Ya Later" in a single-day session, The title and hook was taken from engineer Humberto Gatica, who deflected the band's questions with the phrase. To bolster the album's single lineup, Foster also made changes to "Don't Want To Wait Anymore". An unnamed band member in the 2011 liner notes said "the big choral ending that kicks your ass, that was his idea; and the modulation at the end".

== Packaging and design ==
The album was given a sleek, minimalist aesthetic, with the band only billed as "Tubes" on the front cover, which displayed only a T-shaped piece of PVC pipe casting a shadow on a blue background. The album's design and packaging also parodied the growing corporatism of America, with photos of the band members wearing business suits and album notes billing them as "The Tubes Group", with a slogan of "credibility, growth, direction", and the performance credits including joke credits such as "Analysis", "Motivation", and "Policy".

Printed on the back cover among the album's song lyrics is the text for the non-album track "Tubes Talk". The track is a spoken introduction (read by Fee Waybill) that preceded the non-album song "What's Wrong With Me" on the B-side of several regions' "Talk to Ya Later" single releases.

== Reception and fallout ==
Professional ratings
Review scores
Source	Rating
AllMusic	4/5 stars

The album was received well by critics, and was at the time the band's best selling and charting album. The album's first release and first top 40 hit, "Don't Want to Wait Anymore", peaked at number 35 for two weeks on the US Billboard Hot 100 and for one week on the Cashbox Top 100. It also reached number 22 on the Billboard Hot Mainstream Rock Tracks chart. "Talk to Ya Later" hit number 7 on the Billboard Hot Mainstream Rock Tracks chart. It also spent five weeks on the Billboard Bubbling Under chart, peaking at number 101 and also had a music video produced for the song.

However, internally, things were tense. After "Talk to Ya Later" proved massively successful despite no input from the majority of the band, Foster intended to take the group in a similar direction, with the band's following album Outside Inside featuring even more session musicians and guest writers than before, including a return appearance by Lukather. These tensions would result in the group fragmenting and temporarily disbanding in 1985 after Waybill's debut solo album and the failure of the Rundgren-produced Love Bomb.

== Track listing ==
All tracks composed by the Tubes except where indicated. Song timings taken from original LP.

Original LP side one
No.	Title	Writer(s)	Length
1.	"Talk to Ya Later"	Tubes, David Foster, Steve Lukather	4:41
2.	"Sushi Girl"		3:28
3.	"Amnesia"	Tubes, Foster	4:25
4.	"Mr. Hate"		3:35
5.	"Attack of the Fifty Foot Woman"	Tubes, Michael Snyder	4:30

Original LP side two
No.	Title	Writer(s)	Length
1.	"Think About Me"		3:16
2.	"A Matter of Pride"		3:13
3.	"Don't Want to Wait Anymore"	Tubes, Foster	4:16
4.	"Power Tools"		4:04 (Note: Original versions of the album included a roughly 13-second snippet from "Amnesia" at the end of this track. On later editions, this was moved to the end of "Mr. Hate", where it fades directly into the beginning of "Attack of the Fifty-Foot Woman.")
5.	"Let's Make Some Noise"	Tubes, Foster	3:24
Total length:			39:30

2011 remastered CD bonus tracks
No.	Title	Writer(s)	Length
11.	"Tube Talk" (album outtake, from "Talk to Ya Later" single)		1:19
12.	"What's Wrong With Me" (album outtake, from "Talk to Ya Later" single)		3:59
13.	"Gonna Get It Next Time" (from Modern Problems soundtrack)	Dominic Frontiere; Adrienne Anderson	4:00
14.	"Sports Fans" (non-album single)		4:25
Total length:			53:13

CD Mastered by Vic Anesini at Battery Studios, NY.

== Video ==
1. Think About Me (Instrumental Intro)
2. A Matter of Pride
3. Sports Fans
4. Amnesia
5. Mr. Hate
6. Mondo Bondage
7. Don't Want to Wait Anymore
8. Business
9. Talk to Ya Later
10. Sushi Girl
11. Let's Make Some Noise
12. Weebee Dance
13. White Punks on Dope

This video was choreographed by Kenny Ortega and directed by Russell Mulcahy.

"White Punks on Dope" is included after the closing credits, and contains many scenes from the Tubes early cable access TV appearances as well as footage from early shows where Waybill would play the part of Quay Lewd.

== Personnel ==
=== The Tubes ===
- Bill Spooner – analysis, guitar, vocals
- Michael Cotten – trend, synthesizers
- Fee Waybill – motivation, vocals
- Roger Steen – development, guitar, vocals
- Prairie Prince – systems, drums
- Vince Welnick – accounts, keyboards, vocals
- Rick Anderson – policy, bass

=== Additional personnel ===
- Steve Lukather – guitars and bass on "Talk to Ya Later"
- Stanley Paterson – sampled vocals on "Talk to Ya Later"
- Bobby Colomby – backing vocals (uncredited)
- Bill Champlin – backing vocals (uncredited)

== Charts ==
=== Weekly charts ===
Chart (1981)	Peak position
Australian Albums (Kent Music Report)	74
Canada (RPM)	26
German Albums (Offizielle Top 100)	4
New Zealand Albums (RMNZ)	4
Norwegian Albums (VG-lista)	32
Swedish Albums (Sverigetopplistan)	28
US Billboard 200	36

=== Year-end charts ===
Chart (1981)	Position
New Zealand Albums (RIANZ)	46
