= Airplay (album) =

Studio album by Airplay
- Released: February 1980
- Recorded: 1978–1979
- Studios: Sunset Sound Recorders (Hollywood); Davlen Sound Studios (North Hollywood); Garden Rake Studio (Sherman Oaks); Conway Studios (Hollywood)
- Genres: AOR; pop rock
- Length: 43:17
- Label: RCA
- Producers: Jay Graydon; David Foster

Airplay is the debut and only studio album by American band Airplay. The project was created by Jay Graydon and David Foster in 1978 after working on many sessions together starting in the mid-1970s. They started writing songs that would eventually end up on the album as early as 1978, such as "After the Love Has Gone", which was recorded by Earth, Wind & Fire that same year (the original title of the song was "After the Love Is Gone," but Maurice White altered it for his version.)

== Background ==
In 1978, Graydon and Foster were at a session for Maureen McGovern. During a break, Foster was tinkering around on the Fender Rhodes, and upon hearing what he was playing, Graydon had part of a melody in mind and began working on the song with Foster. When the session was over, they went to Graydon's home studio to continue working on the song. Within an hour or so, they had worked out the chord changes and melody. Foster's wife at the time, B.J. Cook, wrote the lyrics shortly thereafter. The title became "Should We Carry On."

Airplay got their record deal through Tommy Mottola, who was Hall & Oates' manager. At the time, Foster was producing their album, Along the Red Ledge, and played the demo for Mottola, who loved the song and played it for Bob Summers, the head of RCA Records. After hearing the song, Summers offered them a record deal.

In a 2005 interview, Foster recalled that "I think [it was] actually Jay's idea to do an album. Back in the '70s, we were both studio musicians, and Jay figured out before I did that we can be more than just studio musicians. And that was even before we had a singer." He added, "I can only speak for myself, but I never felt myself as an artist. Even with Airplay, it felt like just 2 musicians making a record. And we had no idea that we would have any impact really. I never really believed that we would be successful as artists. Even when we were shooting the album cover and all that, It felt weird that we were actually trying to be the real artists." Graydon noted that their decision to form the group was highly influenced by Toto, who, as studio musicians, formed their group only a few years earlier. Members of Toto also contributed to the album. Of this, Graydon added, "Yeah, it made us jealous. We wanted the same thing they had. They were studio guys, why can't we have that? [But] they had more accessible tunes. We got too musical."

== Production ==
Already having written "Should We Carry On," "After the Love Is Gone," and "She Waits for Me," Graydon and Foster now needed seven more songs for a full-length album. At the time, Foster was producing Alice Cooper's album From the Inside and Cooper offered them a stay at his beach house for a week to write songs. During that week, they wrote "Stranded," "Cryin' All Night," "Nothin' You Can Do About It," and "Bix." They then brought in Steve Kipner to write lyrics for the songs that became "Cryin' All Night" and "Nothin' You Can Do About It."

=== "Stranded" ===
In the 2018 reissue liner notes, Graydon recalled, "When David and I were writing the music, David kept singing "you are" as the first two words, and that stuck when we asked Tom Kelly to write the lyric. Kelly recalled, "Jay played me the track when I was at his studio singing background vocals for one of his projects. He explained that he and David had written this power track and asked if I could finish the song by coming up with a melody & lyrics. I remember Jay had one line he wanted in the song: '...and I don't know how I'll ever survive.' Ok, here's a challenge. I was a budding songwriter at the time, but I had never written a melody and lyrics to a track. I always wrote melodies and chords together. It was such a strong, driving track that I immediately got inspired and wrote the whole thing very quickly. The boys were pleased, and Tommy Funderburk and I sang the vocals soon after. Those were fun, productive times."

=== "Nothin' You Can Do About It" ===
Regarding Jeff Porcaro's drum part on the track, Graydon recalled, "Nobody could play that groove. Jeff thought he couldn't play a shuffle. I mean, it's a funk shuffle, but still a shuffle." Foster added, "We started at midnight and went until 6 am. That was the only time with Jeff. 3 trumpets and 3 trombones. ARP 2600. I didn't use the click. I'm sure we didn't."

American vocal group The Manhattan Transfer recorded a version of the song on their 1979 album Extensions, produced by Graydon. In reference to their version, Graydon said, "You know it's funny, I think I sounded way better than Alan, and he's a singer. I did the arrangement with Greg [Mathieson] and they used synth horns."

=== "Bix" ===
Graydon recalled, "I set Steve up with the idea for the lyric that had to do with a drug propaganda film from 1958 entitled, High School Confidential! One of the characters in the film was a car driver for Mr. Big, and the driver's name in the movie is Bix. He had a line in the film that was very funny. He said, 'Bix likes it when you play it cool.' I asked Steve to use that as the title and sat him down as to watch the movie. He noted some of the funny lines and twisted them around as to work in the song. The lyric is meant to be funny and it works well."

=== Other songs ===
As for "It Will Be Alright" and "Leave Me Alone," Graydon recalled, "David had co-written many of the songs for the Earth, Wind & Fire album I Am. Allee Willis had written the lyrics for some of those songs, so David asked me if it would be ok if Allee wrote the lyrics for those songs. I agreed, and she got to work."

== Cover art ==
Regarding the cover photoshoot, Graydon recalled, "First of all, here we are making a record. And the picture was a perfect example. It was 110°F out in middle of the summer. My hair melted. I didn't have a comb or mirror, and I let it slide. l let the picture go on there as weird as it was, because I thought, 'Who would give a shit. Whatever.' You know? And yeah, I wouldn't fly back then, so how were we going to promote the thing being scared to death about flying. It was a joke." They shot the photos at the Hollywood Burbank Airport and used Earth, Wind & Fire's touring Bicam airplane.

== Track listing ==
=== Original release ===
Side one
No.	Title	Lyrics	Music	Length
1.	"Stranded"	Tom Kelly	Jay Graydon; David Foster	4:28
2.	"Cryin' All Night"	Harry Garfield	Graydon	4:47
3.	"It Will Be Alright"	Allee Willis	Graydon; Foster	4:01
4.	"Nothin’ You Can Do About It"	Steve Kipner	Graydon; Foster	4:47
5.	"Should We Carry On"	B.J. Cook	Graydon; Foster	3:46

Side two
No.	Title	Lyrics	Music	Length
6.	"Leave Me Alone"	Willis	Graydon; Foster	4:35
7.	"Sweet Body"	Ira Ingber	Graydon; Foster	4:40
8.	"Bix"	Kipner	Graydon; Foster	4:15
9.	"She Waits for Me"	Garfield	Graydon	3:41
10.	"After the Love Is Gone"	Champlin	Graydon; Foster	4:29
Total length:				43:39

=== 2018 remastered version ===
Bonus tracks
No.	Title	Lyrics	Music	Length
11.	"Should We Carry On" (Demo)	Cook	Graydon; Foster	3:57
12.	"She Waits for Me" (Demo)	Garfield	Graydon	3:33
13.	"You Can Count on Me" (Demo)	Garfield	Graydon; Foster	4:00
Total length:				55:06

== Personnel ==
=== Airplay ===
- David Foster – piano, keyboards, synthesizers, backing vocals (9), horn arrangements (10)
- Jay Graydon – guitars, guitar solo (1), synthesizer overdubs, lead vocals (2, 4, 5, 9), backing vocals
- Tommy Funderburk – lead vocals (1, 3, 6–8, 10), backing vocals (2, 4)

==== Additional musicians ====
- David Hungate – bass
- Steve Lukather – additional rhythm guitars (6, 7)
- Ray Parker Jr. – additional rhythm guitars (4), backing vocals (4)
- Steve Porcaro – synthesizer programming
- Pete Robinson – synthesizer programming
- Jeff Porcaro – drums (1, 2, 4, 5, 8–10)
- Mike Baird – drums (3, 6, 7)
- Jerry Hey – trumpet, French horn, horn arrangements (4, 8, 10)
- Gary Grant – trumpet (4, 8, 10)
- Steve Madaio – trumpet (4, 8, 10)
- Bill Reichenbach Jr. – trombone (4, 8, 10)
- Charlie Loper – trombone (4, 8, 10)
- Lew McCreary – trombone (4, 8, 10)
- Bill Champlin – lead vocals (8, 10), backing vocals (9)
- Tom Kelly – backing vocals (1, 8)
- Max Gronenthal – backing vocals

=== Technical ===
- Produced by Jay Graydon and David Foster
- Basic tracks engineered by Humberto Gatica at Sunset Sound Recorders
- Additional engineering by Keith Olsen at Davlen Sound Studios
- Overdubs engineered by Jay Graydon at Garden Rake and Conway Studios
- Mixed by Jay Graydon at Garden Rake Studio
- Second engineers – Mark Linett (at Sunset Sound), David DeVore (at Davlen), and David Foster (at Garden Rake)
- Mastered by Bernie Grundman at A&M Studios (Hollywood, CA)
- Studio manager – Bobette Graydon (at Garden Rake)
- Art direction and design – Tim Bryant/Gribbitt!
- Photography – Bob Seidemann
- A&R coordination – Marge Meoli
