= Talk to Ya Later =

Single by The Tubes

from the album The Completion Backward Principle
- B-side: "Tube Talk" (UK) "What's Wrong With Me" "Power Tools" (all releases)
- Released: 1981
- Recorded: 1980
- Genre: Punk rock, power pop, new wave
- Length: 3:44 (single version); 4:41 (album version)
- Label: Capitol
- Songwriters: David Foster, Steve Lukather, Fee Waybill (Note: Album and single releases credit the song to the whole Tubes band, in addition to Foster and Lukather.)
- Producer: David Foster

The Tubes singles chronology
"Don't Want to Wait Anymore" (1981)	"Talk to Ya Later" (1981)	"Sports Fans" (1982)

"Talk to Ya Later" is the second single released from the 1981 album The Completion Backward Principle by American rock band The Tubes. It has remained one of the band's most popular songs despite its rather modest chart performance.

== Background ==
"Talk to Ya Later" was the last song recorded for the album and was composed without input from most of the band's members, though they did participate in the recording process. The main guitar riff was created by Toto guitarist Steve Lukather, while the title and chorus were thought up by lead singer Fee Waybill.

The title is derived from an expression uttered by recording engineer Humberto Gatica. When members of the band would occasionally press him about work in the studio, his response oftentimes was to casually dismiss them with the phrase.

The way the song was created, with its title originating before the music and lyrics, coincidentally matches the concept of the album. It is based on a tactic popularized by a motivational speaker named Stanley Paterson, which involved visualizing the final product before even beginning the process of creating it. The technique was called "The Completion Backward Principle."

== Spoken intro ==
The first twelve seconds of the song feature a short monologue by Stanley Paterson, taken from record eleven of his collection A Treasury Of Automobile Selling, released in 1962. The monologue goes:

"As I mentioned near the close of the last record, this record you are now playing is another example of the Completion Backward Principle. If you can possibly manage the time, please play both sides at one meeting."

This is cut from the single version.

In actuality, the intro was spliced together from two separate quotes by Paterson, both of which are found at the start of each side of his record.

"As I mentioned near the close of the last record, this record you are now playing is the most important in the whole album. If you can possibly manage the time, please play both sides at one meeting."

"Here's another example of the Completion Backward Principle..."

== Music video impact ==
The song was an early example of MTV's efficiency in selling records. The network launched shortly after the release of "Talk To Ya Later" on August 1, 1981, when very few American radio stations were playing songs by the Tubes. In the months following the channel's debut, the band aired a music video on it, causing a surge in sales in the midwest, where MTV was first popular.

This is further supported by the fact that the song was not popular in major markets like New York or Los Angeles, where MTV had not yet been available. The network used this information to convince record companies to make music videos to promote their artists, which many subsequently did.

== Chart history ==
Chart (1981)	Peak position
US Bubbling Under Hot 100 (Billboard)	101
US Top Rock Tracks (Billboard)	7
