= David Foster =

Canadian and American record producer and songwriter (born 1949)

David Foster OC OBC
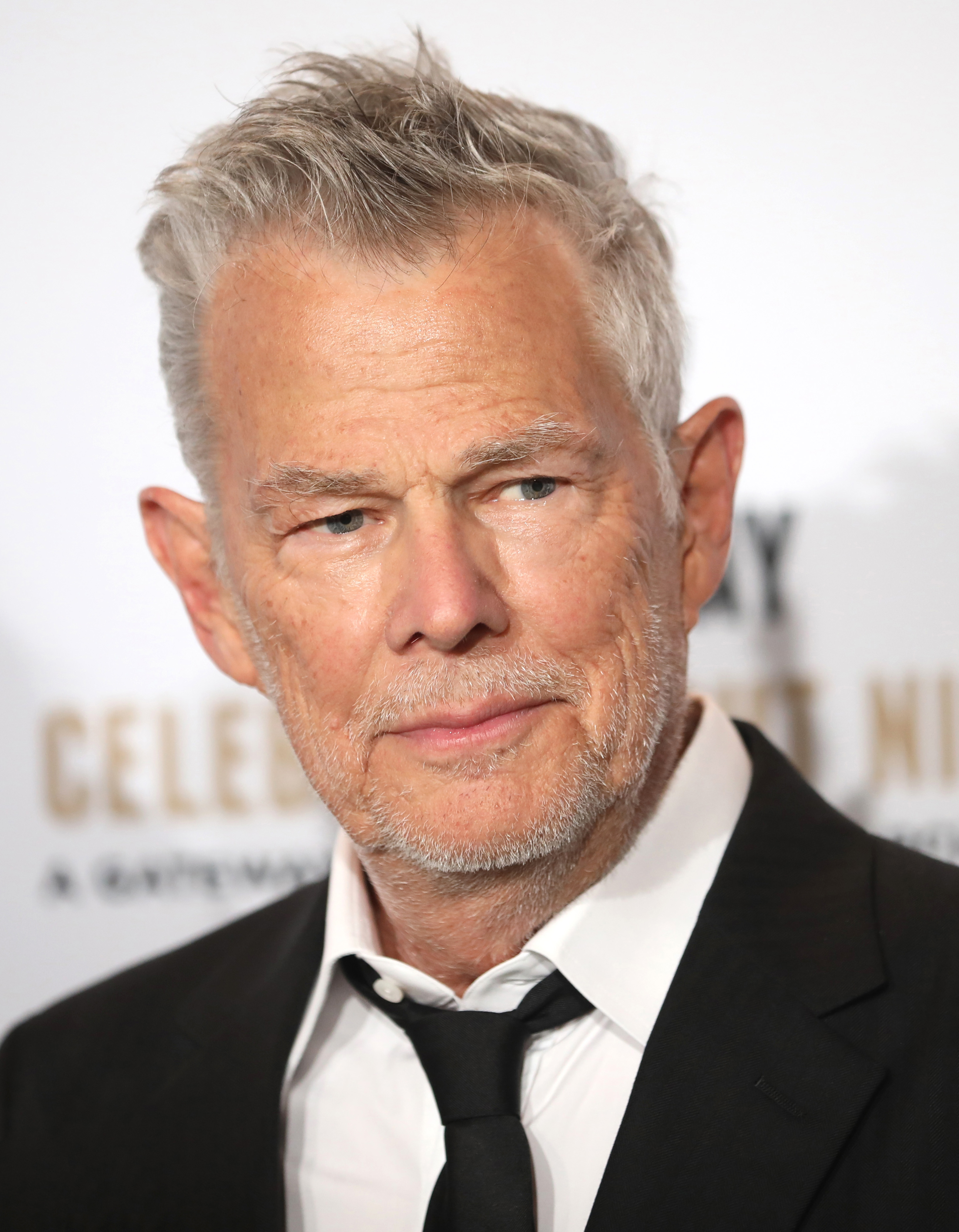
- Foster in 2024
- Born: David Walter Foster; November 1, 1949 (age 77); Victoria, British Columbia, Canada
- Citizenship: Canada; United States
- Occupations: Record producer; composer; songwriter; arranger; musician
- Years active: 1966–present
- Spouses: B.J. Cook (m. 1972; div. 1981); Rebecca Dyer (m. 1982; div. 1986); Linda Thompson (m. 1991; div. 2005); Yolanda Hadid (m. 2011; div. 2017); Katharine McPhee (m. 2019)
- Children: 6
- Musical career
- Genres: Pop; rock; gospel; R&B
- Instruments: Synthesizers; keyboards; vocals
- Labels: Verve; Reprise; 143; Atlantic
- Formerly of: The Strangers; Skylark; Attitudes; Airplay
- Website: davidfoster.com

David Walter Foster (born November 1, 1949) is a Canadian and American record producer, composer, arranger, and musician. He has won 16 Grammy Awards from 45 nominations across four decades (the 1970s, 1980s, 1990s, and 2000s). Since the 1970s, Foster has composed and produced some of the most successful songs of each decade, with multiple songs reaching the top spot on the Billboard Hot 100 and other individual genre charts. He has also been nominated three times in the Best Original song category at the Academy Awards.

Foster has contributed to material for music industry artists across various genres. Some of the songs he has been involved with include: "I Will Always Love You", "I Have Nothing", "The Prayer", "After the Love Has Gone", "Hard to Say I'm Sorry", "Hard Habit to Break", "St. Elmo's Fire (Man in Motion)", "Glory of Love", "Winter Games", "Grown-Up Christmas List", "Best of Me", "Look What You've Done to Me", "She's a Beauty", "Somewhere", and "Wildflower".

Foster served as senior vice president of Warner Music Group from 1997, then he chaired Verve Records from 2012 to 2016.

In the 2020s, Foster composed Boop! The Musical, which premiered in Chicago in 2023 and debuted on Broadway in 2025. He was nominated for a Drama Desk Award for Outstanding Music.

== Early life ==
Foster was born in Victoria, British Columbia, the son of Maurice "Maury" Foster (1913–1968), an office worker, and Eleanor May Foster (née Vantreight) (1918–2006), a homemaker. He has six sisters. His parents discovered his perfect pitch at around age three. During his childhood, he studied both classical and jazz music. When he was 13 years old, he heard The Beatles on the radio and was so impressed that he said, "That's what I want to do". In 1963, he enrolled in the University of Washington's music program. He attended Mount Douglas Secondary School from 1964 to 1966. Although he did not graduate, he was awarded his Dogwood Certificate in 1985 and was named Honorary Alumni President in 2010. While attending school, he performed with the local band The Teen Beats, through which he developed a lasting friendship with fellow member Chris Earthy.

== Career ==
=== 1960s ===
In 1966, he joined a band called The Strangers, and soon afterward they moved to London. They performed with Chuck Berry and Bo Diddley.

In 1969, he auditioned for a band at a nightclub in Edmonton owned by jazz musician Tommy Banks. Around the same time, Foster also performed with Ronnie Hawkins.

=== 1970s ===
In 1971, while playing in Hawkins' band, he met B.J. Cook, and the two quickly hit it off. They soon recruited other musicians to form Skylark. Foster was a keyboardist and de facto leader of Skylark. In 1972, the members of Skylark moved to Los Angeles at the urging of Barry De Vorzon, who became interested in the band after hearing a demo of their song "Wildflower". Cook was persistent and leveraged his connections, and Skylark secured a deal with Capitol Records. The song "Wildflower" produced by Eirik Wangberg, was a top ten hit in 1973. The band disbanded after releasing their second album, while Foster remained in Los Angeles as a studio musician.

In 1974, while working a few minor jobs as a rehearsal pianist, Foster was invited to a weekly jam session hosted by Jim Keltner. This event brought his talent to the attention of the music industry and launching his career in Los Angeles.

In 1975, Foster played on George Harrison's album Extra Texture. He then formed a band called Attitudes with Jim Keltner, Danny Kortchmar, and Paul Stallworth, musicians he had come to know in recent years, and together they released two albums. The band did not have any major hits and later disbanded. Around this time, Foster contributed Fender Rhodes and clavinet to George Harrison's album Thirty Three & 1/3, as well as keyboards on Gary Wright’s The Dream Weaver.

By this time, Foster had collaborated with numerous musicians and had gained a degree of recognition within the music industry. He was credited as a keyboardist on a number of albums from that era. Foster had gradually transitioned from working solely as a studio musician to also taking on the role of producer. When Foster launched his career in music production, he entered into a full-scale management agreement with attorney Ned Shankman and Ron DeBlasio. Foster had been under contract with Shankman since 1974, but this marked his first major management deal.

In 1978, after contributing to the production of various albums, Foster was given the opportunity to produce an entire album for a major record label. The project was Along the Red Ledge for Hall & Oates. This album was the first collaboration with Humberto Gatica, who would go on to become a long-time colleague. Its success led Foster to produce their next album, X-Static.

In the same year, Foster produced From the Inside, a concept album by Alice Cooper.

In 1979, Foster was a major contributor to Earth, Wind & Fire's album I Am, as a keyboardist, arranger and composer. He was a co-writer on six of the album's tracks, such as "After the Love Has Gone", for which he and his co-writers, Jay Graydon and Bill Champlin, won the Grammy Award for Best R&B Song at the 22nd Annual Grammy Awards. In the same year, he formed the band Airplay with Jay Graydon; the group released its only album the following year.

That same year, Foster produced the majority of Deniece Williams' album When Love Comes Calling, marking his first collaboration with Jeremy Lubbock as orchestral arranger and conductor. The two continued to work together on most of Foster's subsequent projects over the decades until Lubbock's death.

=== 1980s ===
In 1980, Foster produced Boz Scaggs's album Middle Man. He co-wrote and played keyboards on some of Scaggs's most successful songs, including "Breakdown Dead Ahead", "Jojo", and "Simone", as well as "Look What You've Done to Me" from the film Urban Cowboy.

Foster went on to produce two albums for The Tubes: The Completion Backward Principle (1981) and Outside Inside (1983). He co-wrote several songs with the group, including "Talk to Ya Later" (with Tubes singer Fee Waybill and Toto guitarist Steve Lukather), the Top 40 hit "Don't Want to Wait Anymore", and the US Top 10 hit "She's a Beauty".

In 1982, Foster produced the original cast album for the Broadway musical Dreamgirls. The album earned him the Grammy Award for Best Cast Show Album at the 25th Annual Grammy Awards.

In 1983, Foster released his first solo album Kimi ni Subete wo (The Best of Me), exclusively in Japan. The album was well received, underwent multiple reprints, and remains available as of 2025. It was essentially a collection of demos, many of its songs have since been covered by other artists.

Foster was a major contributor to the career of jazz rock band Chicago in the early and mid-1980s, serving as the band's producer on Chicago 16 (1982), Chicago 17 (1984), and Chicago 18 (1986). Foster co-wrote several of the band's biggest hits with the band's bassist, Peter Cetera and outside songwriters, including "Hard to Say I'm Sorry" (US No. 1), "Hard Habit to Break" (US No. 3), "You're the Inspiration" (US No. 3), and "Will You Still Love Me?" (US No. 3). Foster worked primarily with Cetera, with whom he shared similar views, and kept his distance from the other members, which led to ongoing discord within the band. Years later, Foster reflected, "I'm sorry for what happened back then." In retrospect, 21st-century reviews have noted that the songwriting, arrangements, and production of Chicago 17 are more representative of Foster's style than of the band's. For his work on the album, Foster was awarded Producer of the Year at the 27th Annual Grammy Awards.

Foster co-wrote Kenny Loggins's song "Heart to Heart" (US No. 15), from the 1982 album High Adventure. Around this time, Foster and Loggins became friends and began collaborating frequently on album production.

Foster also worked with country singer Kenny Rogers on the hit albums What About Me? (1984) and The Heart of the Matter (1985). The latter included a version of "The Best of Me", co-written with Richard Marx and Jeremy Lubbock, which was one of several notable recordings of the song.

In the late 1980s, Foster worked extensively on film soundtracks, sometimes producing entire albums. Three notable examples are St. Elmo's Fire, The Secret of My Success, and Stealing Home. St. Elmo's Fire (1985) was a Brat Pack film. "The Love Theme from St. Elmo's Fire" became an instrumental hit, reaching number 15 on the Billboard Hot 100. John Parr's recording of "St. Elmo's Fire (Man in Motion)" topped the chart at number one. The Secret of My Success (1987), starring Michael J. Fox, is a comedy film that featured the song "The Secret of My Success" by Night Ranger. The song was nominated for the 45th Golden Globe Awards for Best Original Song. Foster also composed the score for Stealing Home (1988), starring Jodie Foster and Mark Harmon. The album features "And When She Danced (Love Theme from Stealing Home)", performed by Marilyn Martin and David Foster.

In 1985, Foster launched a charity project in Canada to support famine relief efforts in Africa. Inspired by USA for Africa. Foster contributed the song "Tears Are Not Enough" and brought together Canadian artists to produce and release it. This song was included on the album We Are the World. By 1990, the project had raised $3.2 million for famine relief in Africa. Ten percent of the funds raised were set aside to support Canadian food banks. Around this time, Foster began to engage more actively in charitable work.

That same year, Foster produced the song "Somewhere" for Barbra Streisand's The Broadway Album. Foster won the Grammy Award for Best Instrumental Arrangement Accompanying Vocal.

In 1986, Foster released his first international album David Foster. The album was nominated for Best Pop Instrumental Performance and Best Engineered Recording at the 29th Grammy Awards. It consists of instrumental tracks and two vocal tracks. The well-known song "Best of Me" is also included on the Japan-exclusive album (1983) with Foster's solo vocals, but this time it has been re-recorded with richer production and features a duet with Olivia Newton-John. The record company finally greenlit the album after the instrumental track "The Love Theme from St. Elmo's Fire" became a major hit the previous year. Earlier, when the album Kimi ni Subete wo (The Best of Me) was released exclusively in Japan, their bid to issue it in the US had failed.

In 1986, Foster also co-wrote, with Peter Cetera and Cetera's wife Diane Nini, the US No. 1 solo hit "Glory of Love".

Foster composed "Winter Games", the instrumental theme song for the 1988 Winter Olympics and performed both the instrumental and its vocal version "Can't You Feel It?" in Calgary, Alberta. The song was nominated for Best Instrumental Composition at the 31st Grammy Awards. The song has since been widely used as background music in television and live event productions.

In 1988, Foster released his second international album, The Symphony Sessions, a collaboration with the Vancouver Symphony Orchestra. A video version of the album was produced and released simultaneously. It appeared on VHS in the United States, Japan, and Canada, and was also issued on Laserdisc in Japan. The video release was nominated for Best Performance Music Video at the 31st Grammy Awards.

In 1989, Foster appeared in his first self-titled television special, A David Foster Christmas Card.

In the late 1980s, Foster signed a personal management deal with Danny Goldberg and Brian Avnet. Together, they also co-founded and managed Foster's personal label, 143 Records. Around the same time, Foster brought on Chris Earthy, a longtime friend from their teenage years in the local band The Teen Beats, as his production and tour manager, a position he held until 2011.

=== 1990s ===
In 1990, Foster released his third album River of Love. It was a collaboration with various singers. Its format is similar to Quincy Jones's albums from the 1980s, though in this case Foster also wrote all of the songs himself. Unlike his previous album, this one contains a variety of material, ranging from up-tempo to ballads. It also includes a new recording of the famous "Grown-Up Christmas List".

In the same year, he helped Celine Dion break into the U.S. market by producing several tracks on her first English-language album, Unison. Dion has credited both her manager René Angélil and Foster for helping her reach the international music scene. Foster would go on to collaborate with Dion on many albums over the following decades.

In 1991, Foster launched a charity project to support soldiers in the Gulf War. Modeled after his African famine relief project six years earlier, he wrote and produced a charity song and brought together well-known North American artists to perform it. The result was "Voices That Care", with proceeds benefiting the United Service Organizations and the American Red Cross Gulf Crisis Fund.

That same year, Foster released his fourth album, Rechordings. Similar to his second album, The Symphony Sessions, it is an instrumental record. The arrangements from this album have since served as the basis for live performances, interviews, and television appearances.

In the same year, Foster produced Natalie Cole's album Unforgettable... with Love. The album was a huge success, winning Album of the Year and Best Engineered Recording at the 34th Annual Grammy Awards. The track "Unforgettable" (a duet with her father, Nat King Cole) earned three additional Grammys: Record of the Year, Traditional Pop Vocal Performance, and Best Instrumental Arrangement Accompanying Vocal. Foster was also awarded Producer of the Year. The album went on to win the Soul Train Music Award for Best R&B/Soul Album, and in 1998 it was certified 7× Platinum by the RIAA. When the recording sessions began, Cole expressed her desire to record "Unforgettable" as a duet with her father. Creating such a duet was extremely challenging with the technology available at the time. The album marked Cole's comeback, completely reversing her previous decline.

The Bodyguard, Whitney Houston's soundtrack album, was released in 1992 and was partially produced by Foster. Before recording "I Will Always Love You", Foster contacted the song's writer, Dolly Parton, about using it. When he mentioned that he planned to follow Linda Ronstadt's version, Parton suggested restoring a third verse from her original lyrics, which she felt was important. Foster agreed. According to him, the recording was completed in a single take without splicing. The version ultimately used was actually a rough cut that Clive Davis requested, rather than the final polished version. The album became a historic success, topping the charts in 21 countries. It stayed at number one on the Billboard 200 for 20 consecutive weeks, making it the first album by a female artist to achieve that milestone. It sold over one million copies per week for several consecutive weeks, and later became one of three Houston albums certified Diamond by the RIAA. As of 2017, the album had sold 50 million copies worldwide—making it the best-selling soundtrack album of all time, the best-selling album by a woman, and the third best-selling album overall, behind only AC/DC's Back in Black and Michael Jackson's Thriller. The first single, "I Will Always Love You", spent 14 consecutive weeks at number one on the Billboard Hot 100. This tied Houston's record for the most number-one singles by a female artist at the time, and the song went on to top the charts in 34 countries. It sold more than 24 million copies worldwide, becoming the best-selling single by a female artist of all time. At the 65th Academy Awards, "Run to You" and Foster's composition "I Have Nothing" were nominated for Best Original Song. At the 36th Grammy Awards, "I Will Always Love You" won the awards for Best Female Pop Vocal Performance and Record of the Year. The Bodyguard won the award for Album of the Year. "I Have Nothing" and "Run to You" were also nominated for Best Song Written for Visual Media. Foster himself won the award for Best Instrumental Arrangement, Accompanying Vocal for "When I Fall in Love", sung by Celine Dion and Clive Griffin, and was additionally awarded Producer of the Year. Incidentally, Foster makes a brief appearance in the film as a conductor, and his name appears in the end credits.

In 1993, Foster starred in his second self-titled television special, David Foster's Christmas Album.

In 1994, Foster held a concert in Japan called JT Super Producers '94. The concert was part of a series of events showcasing leading producers of the time. Before and after the concert, he conducted producer workshops in which he spoke about his role as a producer. The album Love Lights the World, featuring tracks created for the concert, was released in advance and later distributed not only in Japan but also across Asia. Performers included Celine Dion, Peabo Bryson, Color Me Badd, Jay Graydon, Wendy Morton, Warren Wiebe, ANRI, the New Japan Philharmonic (conducted by Jeremy Lubbock), Michael Thompson, Chester Thompson, Claude Gaudette, Leland Sklar, and the Seawind Horns.

The American R&B group All-4-One released "I Swear", produced by Foster, in 1994. The song topped the Billboard Hot 100 for 11 consecutive weeks.

By this point, Foster's focus had shifted beyond the role of producer. In 1995, he signed a deal with Warner Bros. to launch his boutique label, 143 Records, as a joint venture with the company. He entrusted day-to-day operations of the label to his then-manager, Brian Avnet. One of the label's first signings was the Irish folk-rock band The Corrs, whose debut album he produced. By 1997, Foster concluded that, at least in the American market, "logo labels" like 143 were in a difficult position. He sold the label back to Warner and became a senior vice president at the corporation. In 2001, Warner Music Group announced it was shutting down the label and its artists were transferred to other Warner imprints (mainly Reprise). However, the 143 name was retained within Warner and continues to exist into the 2020s, though its role has been diminished.

Madonna produced new songs for the compilation album Something to Remember, including two collaborations with Foster. "You'll See", released in 1995, became a hit.

"The Power of the Dream" is a song written and produced by Foster, Linda Thompson, and Babyface for the opening ceremony of the 1996 Summer Olympics. Celine Dion performed the song with Foster on piano before a stadium audience of 100,000 and a global television audience of more than 3.5 billion viewers. The track was later released worldwide on Dion's compilation The Collector's Series, Volume One.

Foster participated annually in Andre Agassi's Grand Slam for Children charity concert every year since 1995.

In 1996, Foster produced Diane Warren songs such as "Un-Break My Heart" (Toni Braxton) and "Because You Loved Me" (Celine Dion), and also produced "When I Fall in Love" (Natalie Cole). At the 39th Grammy Awards, the album Falling Into You, which features "Because You Loved Me", won Album of the Year, while "When I Fall In Love" earned Best Instrumental Arrangement With Accompanying Vocal(s).

In 1997, Foster's major productions included the Barbra Streisand and Celine Dion duet "Tell Him", Monica's "For You I Will", and Az Yet's "Hard to Say I'm Sorry". All three songs were hits, and the latter two received Grammy nominations.

In 1998, Foster produced and co-wrote "The Prayer", performed by Celine Dion and Andrea Bocelli, both as a duet and as solo artists. The song, has become one of his most covered works, won a Golden Globe Award for Best Original Song and was nominated for an Academy Award in the same category in 1998, and received a Grammy nomination for Best Pop Collaboration in 2000. Foster and Bocelli also developed a close working relationship, frequently collaborating on albums and concerts thereafter.

=== 2000s ===
Foster produced major-label debut albums of Josh Groban (2001), Michael Bublé (2003), Renee Olstead (2004), and Charice (2010). They were mentored by Foster and were previously signed to 143 Records. In the 2000s, Foster's work also had a significant A&R component.

In 2001, Foster collaborated with Lara Fabian and the Vancouver Symphony Orchestra to record English, French, and bilingual versions of the Canadian national anthem, "O Canada". Following the September 11 attacks, the Canadian government organized several cultural events to strengthen ties with the United States. As part of these initiatives, Lara Fabian was selected to perform a special rendition of "O Canada".

In the same year, the film The Score, starring Robert De Niro and Marlon Brando, featured a Diana Krall recording, "I'll Make It Up as I Go". The song was composed by Foster together with his daughter Amy Foster-Gillies.

Foster also became involved in his first talent show, Popstars USA, where he served as a mentor. The program aired on The WB from 2001 to 2002. From then through the 2010s, he frequently appeared on talent shows.

In collaboration with Linda Thompson, Foster composed "Light the Fire Within", sung by LeAnn Rimes for the 2002 Winter Olympics. The song was later included on the 2002 reissue of Rimes' album I Need You.

In 2003, Foster won an Emmy Award for Outstanding Music and Lyrics for The Concert for World Children's Day. For more details, see the separate chapter.

In 2005, Foster, his daughter Amy Foster-Gillies, and Beyoncé wrote "Stand Up For Love" as the anthem for the World Children's Day. In 2004, Destiny's Child had received the "Caring Hands, Caring Hearts" award from McDonald's Corporation in recognition of their role as global ambassadors for World Children's Day.

In 2006, Foster appeared as a mentor on Season 5 of American Idol.

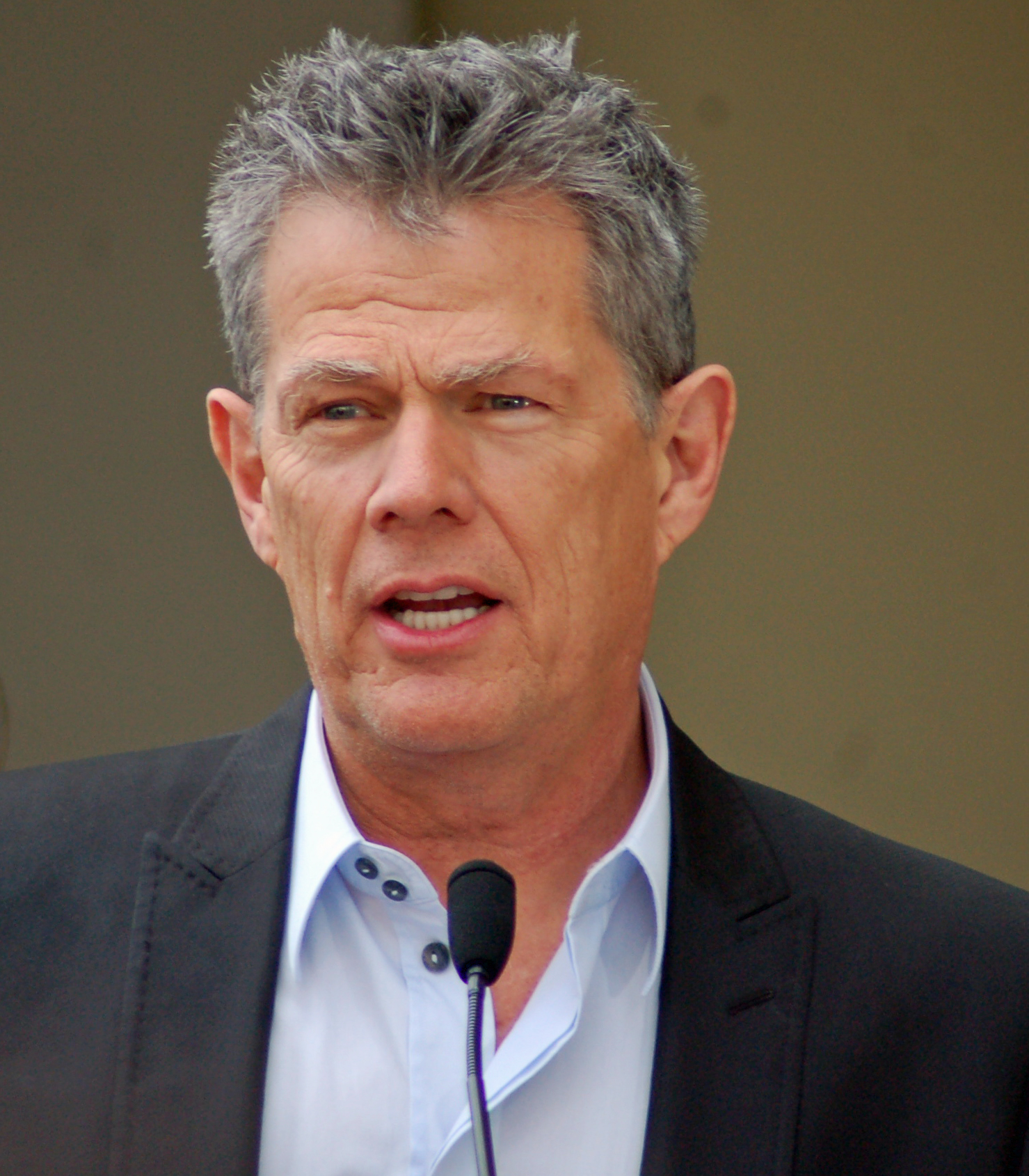
Foster speaking in a ceremony for Andrea Bocelli at the Hollywood Walk of Fame, 2010

In 2008, Foster staged a one-night concert called Hitman: David Foster & Friends at the Mandalay Bay resort in Las Vegas featuring Andrea Bocelli, Michael Bublé, Josh Groban, Peter Cetera, Katharine McPhee, Celine Dion, Blake Shelton, Brian McKnight, and Charice. The event marked the beginning of the Foster & Friends series, which continued into the 2020s. From that point on, Foster increasingly shifted his focus from studio work to live performances. The concert was originally produced for broadcast on PBS, aired the following month as part of PBS's Great Performances series, and was later released on DVD.

That same year, Foster's composition and production "I Will Be There With You" was used in Japan Airlines promotions through 2011. Initially, an instrumental version and a Japanese version performed by ANRI were produced. In 2019, an English version featuring vocals by Katharine McPhee was released.

Seal collaborated with Foster on Soul (2008), which became a moderate hit. He continued working with Foster on Commitment (2010) and Soul 2 (2011).

Foster has produced Michael Bublé since his debut and won the Grammy Award for Best Traditional Pop Vocal Album for Bublé's fifth album, Call Me Irresponsible (2008), his first Grammy in 11 years. The following year, Foster won the same award again for Bublé's album Crazy Love (2009). As of 2025, this remains his 16th and most recent Grammy Award.

The sixth and final collaboration between Foster and Whitney Houston, "I Didn't Know My Own Strength", was released in 2009.

Between 2009 and 2012, Foster organized an intensive tour of North America and Asia with his concert series David Foster & Friends.

In 2009, Foster published his first book, an autobiography titled Hitman: Forty Years Making Music, Topping the Charts, and Winning Grammys.

=== 2010s ===
In 2011, it was confirmed that Foster would become Chairman of Verve Music Group. He left Verve in 2016 as part of a label reorganization.

During the 2010s, Foster returned to producing music albums. In 2011, Foster teamed up with young singer Jackie Evancho for her Dream With Me Concert on PBS at the Ringling Brothers Museum in Sarasota, Florida. An album featuring the same songs was released simultaneously with the broadcast, and the entire album was produced by Foster. That same year, Foster produced Michael Bublé's album Christmas, which became Bublé's best-selling album to date, ranking among the top 50 best-selling albums of the 21st century as of 2025. In 2013, Foster produced all of Mary J. Blige's first Christmas album A Mary Christmas, which features artists Marc Anthony, Jessie J, The Clark Sisters, Barbra Streisand, and Chris Botti. That same year, he also produced all of Andrea Bocelli's album Passione, a collection of Mediterranean love songs featuring duets with Jennifer Lopez, Nelly Furtado, and a virtual duet with Edith Piaf. In 2014, he produced an album with Bryan Adams titled Tracks of My Years.

In 2014, Foster's first musical, Primal Scream: The Musical, premiered at Pepperdine University's Smothers Theatre in a one-night charity performance. It was produced by Malibu hairstylist Marie Ferro, with a book by Juliana Jurenas and direction by Jim Fall. The work explored themes of group therapy, love, and human psychology, and was loosely inspired by France Janov, the wife of psychologist Arthur Janov. In the late 1980s, Foster acquired the stage rights to The Primal Scream, Janov's seminal book. More than 30 songs were written for the show and performed on stage, but as of 2025, only two remain publicly available: Celine Dion's "The Colour of My Love", from her 1993 album, and "The Joy of Christmas Past", from Foster's 1989 Christmas program. The only other known titles are "Love Me", "Pray for Him", "Tears for Fears", and "Why Can't People Get Along".

Foster also served as a judge on Asia's Got Talent during the 2015, 2017, and 2019 seasons.

In 2018, Foster was collaborating with Jewel to create a musical based on Amy Bloom's novel Lucky Us. Plans were also underway to adapt many of Foster's past compositions into musicals, but as of 2025, none of these productions have premiered.

Michael Bublé returned to the music scene after his son's recovery from illness and released a new album Love in 2018. Although Foster had retired from producing, he made an exception to contribute to its production.

In 2018, Foster replaced his long-running Foster & Friends series with An Intimate Evening with David Foster. He continues to tour extensively each year with his wife, Katharine McPhee. As of 2025, Foster & Friends still exists, though at a reduced frequency.

=== 2020s ===
In the 2020s, Foster signed a personal management deal with Marc Johnston.

Foster released his first studio album in 27 years, Eleven Words, in 2020. The album is entirely instrumental and strongly classical in style. The album reached number one on Billboard's Classical Crossover Albums chart and number four on the Classical Albums chart.

In 2023, Foster produced Chris Botti's album Vol. 1 in its entirety, his first production for another artist in five years.

That same year, Foster released the album Christmas Songs with his wife Katharine McPhee. The album is a collection of standards featuring Foster on keyboards and McPhee on vocals.

Foster also composed a musical based on Betty Boop, with lyrics by Susan Birkenhead and a book by Bob Martin. Boop! The Musical premiered at the CIBC Theatre in Chicago in 2023. It transferred to Broadway in 2025, and he was nominated for a Drama Desk Award for his music.

== Television appearances ==
Regarding television appearances, one-off guest spots are excluded due to their large number spanning from the 1970s through the 2020s. Recurring roles, such as season-long appearances or serving as a coach or mentor, are included.

In 1985, a behind-the-scenes documentary about the making of the Ethiopia Fund relief charity song "Tears Are Not Enough" aired three days before Christmas on Canada's CBC. Foster appears in the documentary as the song's producer. It was released on VHS in the United States, Japan, and Canada, and was also issued on Laserdisc in Japan.

In 1987, Foster appeared as the host of The Real Stuff – Canadian Forces Snowbirds, a documentary about the Royal Canadian Air Force's military aerobatics flight demonstration team, commonly known as the Snowbirds, which aired on Canada's CBC. The documentary featured several songs from his album David Foster, released the previous year, including "Flight of the Snowbirds".

In 1989, Foster's first Christmas television special, A David Foster Christmas Card featuring his family and many of his friends, including Wayne Gretzky, Katarina Witt, Dan Gallagher, Kenny Loggins, and Natalie Cole, aired on CBC in December. It was filmed at the Springs Hotel in Banff. The hour-long program featured nine songs, five of which were new, including Natalie Cole's performance of "Grown-Up Christmas List". The show was released on VHS and laserdisc in Japan in 1991.

In 1992, Foster traveled to Indonesia to record the television special David Foster's Twilight Orchestra on the national broadcaster RCTI.

In 1993, Foster's second Christmas television special, David Foster's Christmas Album featuring many singers, including Celine Dion, Tom Jones, and Michael Crawford, aired on NBC in the United States on December 10. The format was similar to his first Christmas television special, but Foster was the only returning performer. This program has never been officially released for sale or distribution and remains unavailable, although a CD based on this show is still available.

The 1994 concert in Japan, JT Super Producers '94, was broadcast almost in full by the Japanese network NTV a few months later.

Foster appeared in Popstars USA, a WB reality series designed to create the next girl group. The program aired on The WB from 2001 to 2002, resulting in the formation of Eden's Crush (featuring Nicole Scherzinger). Foster and Linda Thompson wrote and produced several songs for their album.

In 2003, Foster won an Emmy Award for Outstanding Music and Lyrics for The Concert for World Children's Day. This charity music special aired on ABC in the United States on November 14, 2002. It featured performances by Enrique Iglesias, Peter Cetera, Josh Groban, Nick Carter, Yolanda Adams, and others. Foster served as both music director and host. All net proceeds from the event and DVD sales were donated to Ronald McDonald House Charities.

In 2005, Foster and his family's home life was featured in a staged reality television show, The Princes of Malibu, which aired on Fox. The premise centered on Foster's attempts to teach his spoiled stepsons, Brandon and Brody Jenner—the children of Thompson and Olympian Caitlyn Jenner—to straighten out their lives and earn their own way.

In 2006, Foster was heavily involved in talent shows. Below is a list of the programs he appeared on.

- Foster appeared as a mentor on Season 5 of American Idol, coaching Katharine McPhee, who would later become his wife.
- He served as a judge on Season 4 of Nashville Star, a country music talent competition.
- He was a judge on Celebrity Duets.
- He served as both musical director and judge on StarTomorrow.

In 2006, Foster was the musical director for JCPenney Jam: The Concert For American Kids.

That same year, Foster was featured in Under the Desert Sky, Andrea Bocceli's live album and DVD of a pop concert held in Las Vegas.

In 2007, Foster was appeared in Bocelli's Vivere: Live in Tuscany, a live album and DVD of a pop concert performed at Bocelli's Teatro del Silenzio in Lajatico, Tuscany in July.

In 2008, Foster was featured in a PBS special titled Hit Man: David Foster & Friends, a concert showcasing live performances by Foster and numerous guest artists.

In 2009, Foster performed in a Christmas concert with Andrea Bocelli, which aired on PBS as part of the Great Performances series.

In 2011, Foster's ongoing Friends concert series returned to PBS under the title Hitman Returns, following the 2008 edition.

In the same year, Foster was featured in Andrea Bocelli's live album Concerto: One Night in Central Park (also known as Live in Central Park).

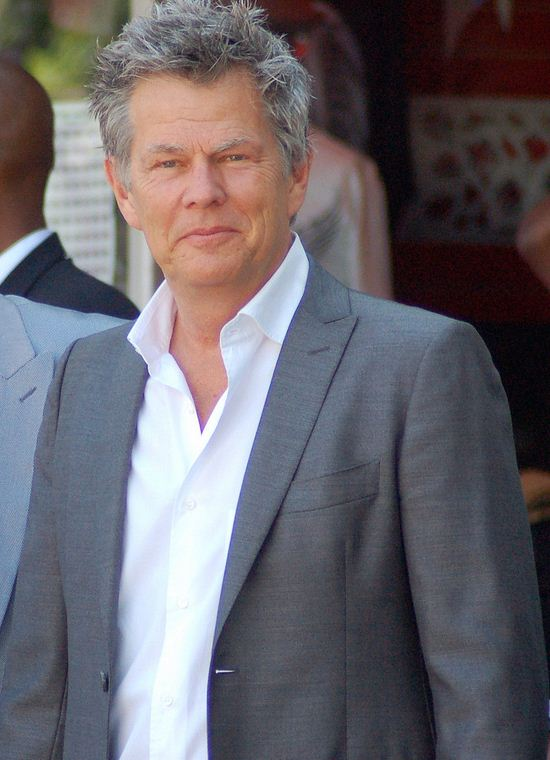
Foster in September 2012

In 2012, Foster appeared in an episode of The Real Housewives of Beverly Hills. His wife, Yolanda Foster, had joined the cast of season three.

In 2015, Foster joined the panel of judges for Asia's Got Talent in Malaysia and Singapore. He returned as a judge in 2017 alongside Anggun, Mel C, and Vanness Wu for the second season, and again in 2019 with Anggun and Jay Park for the third season.

In 2016, Foster collaborated with Russian artist Emin on a concert in St. Petersburg, Russia, performing before an audience of 50,000. The concert was broadcast nationwide on PBS. Emin had first met Foster through PBS and later invited him to collaborate.

In 2018, Foster and Katharine McPhee appeared in Series 3 of The Great Songwriters, a music documentary program produced primarily for in-flight entertainment and satellite broadcast.

In 2019, PBS aired An Intimate Evening with David Foster, featuring his wife Katharine McPhee, tenor Fernando Varela, Pia Toscano, Loren Allred, and Shelea.

That same year, Foster served as a judge on World's Got Talent on China's Hunan Television, an unofficial adaptation of Simon Cowell's franchise.

The biographical documentary David Foster: Off the Record was produced and directed by Barry Avrich. It debuted at the Toronto International Film Festival in September 2019. It features previously unpublished archival footage and exclusive interviews, and appearances by artists including Barbra Streisand, Michael Bublé, Josh Groban, and Celine Dion.

In 2021, Foster and McPhee competed on season six of The Masked Singer as "Banana Split". They were eliminated in the Group B Finale, where they competed against Jewel, who performed as "Queen of Hearts".

== Christmas album productions ==
In 1993, Foster hosted a Christmas special titled David Foster's Christmas Album on NBC featuring many well-known artists performing holiday songs. A CD of the program's recordings was released in November, one month before the broadcast. Like Foster's other albums, it has been reissued multiple times and remains available today.

Foster's work on Christmas albums began in 1984 with Once Upon a Christmas by Kenny Rogers and Dolly Parton, the first of several best-selling holiday records he would go on to produce. He later produced Celine Dion's These Are Special Times (1998), Josh Groban's Noël (2007), Andrea Bocelli's My Christmas (2009), Michael Bublé's Christmas (2011), Rod Stewart's Merry Christmas, Baby (2012), Mary J. Blige's A Mary Christmas (2013), and Jordan Smith's 'Tis the Season (2016). Four of these albums rank among the top fifteen best-selling Christmas albums of all time.

Foster also wrote the holiday standard Grown-Up Christmas List in 1989. The song has become a favorite among artists and has been featured on numerous albums.

In 2022, Foster and Katharine McPhee recorded a seven-song Christmas EP titled Christmas Songs. The project was reissued as a full-length album with seven additional tracks, expanding the original EP into a complete holiday release in 2023.

== Philanthropy ==
Regarding charitable activities, the following list is limited to events in which Foster took a leading role. Mere attendance at charity events is excluded due to their sheer number. Exceptions are made if he made a significant contribution as a guest or has contributed over many years, in which case the reason for his contribution is noted.

In 1986, Foster established the David Foster Foundation. The impetus for its creation came from his encounter with a young girl awaiting a liver transplant. After fulfilling her modest wish, he became profoundly aware of the importance of a child's life, which inspired him to create the foundation. To raise funds for the foundation, Foster has organized more than 100 benefit events over several decades, often persuading friends and colleagues to participate. Since its first grant, Foster and other donors have supported more than 1,500 families through the foundation, helping cover both medical and non-medical expenses. In 2022, the foundation provided assistance to 20% of Canadian families whose children received liver, kidney, heart, or lung transplants. In recognition of his efforts, Foster received the Humanitarian Award by the Canadian Academy of Recording Arts and Sciences in 2019.

Foster was involved behind the scenes for more than a decade at Phoenix's Celebrity Fight Night, an annual fundraiser for the Muhammad Ali Parkinson Center at Barrow Neurological Institute.

Since 1996, Foster has served as musical director of the Carousel of Hope, helping raise awareness and funds for type 1 diabetes and enabling the Children's Diabetes Foundation and Barbara Davis Center to provide vital support to individuals with diabetes and their families.

Throughout the 1980s and 1990s, Foster took part in and performed at numerous telethons for Variety Club, the Children's Charity, broadcast on CHAN-DT in Vancouver. He was often joined by fellow artists he knew, and he continues to be involved with the organization today.

From 1995 to 2008, Foster participated annually in Andre Agassi's Grand Slam for Children charity concerts. In more recent years, he has occasionally served as music director, supporting efforts to expand educational opportunities for underserved children and their communities.

== Personal life ==
As of 2019, Foster had been married five times and had five daughters, one son and nine grandchildren.

Foster's first child, Allison Jones Foster, was born in 1970 when he was 21. He and her mother gave her up for adoption; he reunited with her as an adult. She serves as secretary of the David Foster Foundation. As of 2019, Allison was married and had two children.

His first marriage was to singer and writer B.J. Cook in 1972; they divorced in 1981. They had one daughter, Amy (b. 1973).

He married his second wife, Rebecca Dyer, in 1982; they divorced in 1986. They had three daughters: Sara (b. 1981), Erin (b. 1982), and Jordan (b. 1986). Sara and Erin created the TV show Nobody Wants This based on their lives. Their mother, Rebecca Dyer, dated Kate Hudson's fiancé Danny Fujikawa's father, Ron Fujikawa, for 10 years. Hudson met him through Sara and Erin Foster, with whom she is close friends.

He married his third wife, songwriter Linda Thompson, in 1991; they divorced in 2005. The two became a songwriting team, collaborating on many songs, including "I Have Nothing", performed by Whitney Houston in The Bodyguard (1992), and "Grown-Up Christmas List". Foster was stepfather to Brandon and Brody Jenner (Linda's sons with Caitlyn Jenner), who both grew up living in his Malibu home. Both Jenner boys starred in a short-lived reality television series, The Princes of Malibu, in 2005, which also featured Foster and Thompson and was filmed in their home.

In 1992, Foster was driving on the Pacific Coast Highway when he accidentally struck actor and dancer Ben Vereen with his car. Vereen had just suffered a stroke while driving near his Malibu home and was stumbling on the highway. He was critically injured but recovered after undergoing physical rehabilitation. Vereen later stated that he would have died if Foster had not collided with him and then called for emergency services.

Foster married his fourth wife, Dutch model Yolanda Hadid, in 2011; they divorced in 2017. He became stepfather to Yolanda's three children from her previous marriage to Mohamed Hadid: Gigi (b. 1995), Bella (b. 1996), and Anwar (b. 1999).

In 2018, Foster became engaged to Katharine McPhee. They were married at the St Yeghiche Armenian Church in South Kensington, London, on June 28, 2019. McPhee gave birth to a son, Rennie, in 2021.

Foster's sister, producer Jaymes Foster, has a son with Clay Aiken.

Foster is also a cousin of racecar driver Billy Foster.

In addition to his Canadian citizenship, David Foster has had US citizenship since 2000.

== Discography ==
- The Best of Me (1983) - exclusively in Japan
- David Foster (1986)
- The Symphony Sessions (1988)
- River of Love (1990)
- Rechordings (1991)
- The Christmas Album (1993)
- Love Lights the World (1994) - exclusively in Asia
- Eleven Words (2020)
- Christmas Songs (2023)

=== Collaborations ===
- Backup band for Chuck Berry, Ronnie Hawkins and Bo Diddley (1966–1970)
- Skylark – Skylark (1972)
- Goodnight Vienna – Ringo Starr (1974)
- Teaser – Tommy Bolin (1975)
- The Hungry Years – Neil Sedaka (1975)
- Kim Carnes – Kim Carnes (1975)
- Extra Texture (Read All About It) – George Harrison (1975)
- Nigel Olsson – Nigel Olsson (1975)
- Nuthin' Fancy – Lynyrd Skynyrd (1975)
- The Main Refrain – Wendy Waldman (1976)
- Slow Down World – Donovan (1976)
- Thirty Three & 1/3 – George Harrison (1976)
- A Night on the Town – Rod Stewart (1976)
- Lisa Dal Bello – Dalbello (1977)
- Figli delle stelle – Alan Sorrenti (1977)
- The Music Man – Paul Anka (1977)
- Here You Come Again – Dolly Parton (1977)
- Southern Nights – Glen Campbell (1977)
- Foot Loose & Fancy Free – Rod Stewart (1977)
- Ringo the 4th – Ringo Starr (1977)
- Along the Red Ledge – Daryl Hall & John Oates (1978)
- Bish – Stephen Bishop (1978)
- Nigel Olsson – Nigel Olsson (1978)
- Heartbreaker – Dolly Parton (1978)
- Totally Hot – Olivia Newton-John (1978)
- From the Inside – Alice Cooper (1978)
- Off the Wall – Michael Jackson (1979)
- In Love – Cheryl Lynn (1979)
- Headlines – Paul Anka (1979)
- When Love Comes Calling – Deniece Williams (1979)
- Great Balls of Fire – Dolly Parton (1979)
- I Am – Earth, Wind & Fire (1979)
- Middle Man – Boz Scaggs (1980)
- Shine – Average White Band (1980)
- Aretha – Aretha Franklin (1980)
- Airplay – Airplay (1980)
- He Who Rides the Tiger – Bernie Taupin (1980)
- This Time – Al Jarreau (1980)
- Bi-Coastal – Peter Allen (1980)
- Faces – Earth, Wind & Fire (1980)
- MISS M – Mariya Takeuchi (1980)
- What Cha' Gonna Do for Me – Chaka Khan (1981)
- Love All the Hurt Away – Aretha Franklin (1981)
- It's the World Gone Crazy – Glen Campbell (1981)
- The Dude – Quincy Jones (1981)
- Sometimes Late at Night – Carole Bayer Sager (1981)
- Every Home Should Have One – Patti Austin (1981)
- Breakin' Away – Al Jarreau (1981)
- The Completion Backward Principle – The Tubes (1981)
- Raise! – Earth, Wind & Fire (1981)
- Lite Me Up – Herbie Hancock (1982)
- Friends in Love – Dionne Warwick (1982)
- High Adventure – Kenny Loggins (1982)
- Heartlight – Neil Diamond (1982)
- Donna Summer – Donna Summer (1982)
- Thriller – Michael Jackson (1982)
- Chicago 16 – Chicago (1982)
- Angel Heart – Jimmy Webb (1982)
- Feel My Soul – Jennifer Holliday (1983)
- It's Your Night – James Ingram (1983)
- We've Got Tonight – Kenny Rogers (1983)
- Outside Inside – The Tubes (1983)
- Dirty Looks – Juice Newton (1983)
- The Wild Heart – Stevie Nicks (1983)
- Walk a Fine Line – Paul Anka (1983)
- Electric Universe – Earth, Wind & Fire (1983)
- Two Eyes – Brenda Russell (1983)
- Not the Boy Next Door – Peter Allen (1983)
- Can't Slow Down – Lionel Richie (1983)
- Jarreau – Al Jarreau (1983)
- Daydream Coast – Naoko Kawai (1984)
- Chicago 17 – Chicago (1984)
- Read My Lips – Fee Waybill (1984)
- Primitive – Neil Diamond (1984)
- High Crime – Al Jarreau (1984)
- What About Me? – Kenny Rogers (1984)
- I Feel for You – Chaka Khan (1984)
- Once Upon a Christmas – Kenny Rogers, Dolly Parton (1984)
- I Can Wait Forever/Ghostbusters: Original Soundtrack Album - Air Supply (1984)
- Friends – Dionne Warwick (1985)
- The Broadway Album – Barbra Streisand (1985)
- Vox Humana – Kenny Loggins (1985)
- Watching You Watching Me – Bill Withers (1985)
- 9 1/2 NINE HALF – Naoko Kawai (1985)
- The Heart of the Matter – Kenny Rogers (1985)
- Rhythm of the Night – DeBarge (1985)
- Here's the World for Ya – Payolas (1985)
- "The Best of Me" – Olivia Newton-John (1986)
- Chicago 18 – Chicago (1986)
- Winner in You – Patti LaBelle (1986)
- "Now and Forever (You and Me)" – Anne Murray (1986)
- Headed for the Future – Neil Diamond (1986)
- East of Midnight – Gordon Lightfoot (1986)
- Precious Moments – Jermaine Jackson (1986)
- Reservations for Two – Dionne Warwick (1987)
- The Best Years of Our Lives – Neil Diamond (1988)
- Lefty – Art Garfunkel (1988)
- Citron – Seiko Matsuda (1988)
- Somebody Loves You – Paul Anka (1989)
- Through the Storm – Aretha Franklin (1989)
- Flowers in the Dirt – Paul McCartney (1989)
- Unison – Céline Dion (1990)
- What You See Is What You Sweat – Aretha Franklin (1991)
- HIStory: Past, Present and Future, Book I – Michael Jackson (1991)
- Unforgettable... with Love – Natalie Cole (1991)
- Leap of Faith – Kenny Loggins (1991)
- The Bodyguard: Original Soundtrack Album – Whitney Houston/various artists (1992)
- World Falling Down – Peter Cetera (1992)
- Timeless: The Classics – Michael Bolton (1992)
- Soul Dancing – Taylor Dayne (1993)
- Airplay For The Planet – Jay Graydon (1993)
- The One Thing – Michael Bolton (1993)
- The Colour of My Love – Céline Dion (1993)
- Goodbye - Air Supply (1993)
- Through the Fire – Peabo Bryson (1994)
- My Cherie – Sheena Easton (1995)
- "Childhood" – Michael Jackson (1995)
- Something to Remember – Madonna (1995)
- Falling into You – Céline Dion (1996)
- Stardust – Natalie Cole (1996)
- Open Road – Gary Barlow (1997)
- Let's Talk About Love – Céline Dion (1997)
- Higher Ground – Barbra Streisand (1997)
- Bathhouse Betty – Bette Midler (1998)
- A Body of Work – Paul Anka (1998)
- Back with a Heart – Olivia Newton-John (1998)
- A Love Like Ours – Barbra Streisand (1999)
- Rainbow – Mariah Carey (1999)
- The Heat – Toni Braxton (2000)
- Josh Groban – Josh Groban (2001)
- Christmas Memories – Barbra Streisand (2001)
- Enchantment – Charlotte Church (2001)
- A New Day Has Come – Céline Dion (2002)
- Closer – Josh Groban (2003)
- Michael Bublé – Michael Bublé (2003)
- Blue Skies – Diana DeGarmo (2004)
- Miracle – Céline Dion (2004)
- It's Time – Michael Bublé (2005)
- Awake – Josh Groban (2006)
- East of Angel Town – Peter Cincotti (2007)
- Call Me Irresponsible – Michael Bublé (2007)
- Soul – Seal (2008)
- Skylark – Renee Olstead (2009)
- Crazy Love – Michael Bublé (2009)
- Soul 2 – Seal (2011)
- Christmas – Michael Bublé (2011)
- Merry Christmas, Baby – Rod Stewart (2012)
- Tracks of My Years – Bryan Adams (2014)
- Wallflower – Diana Krall (2015)
- Love – Michael Bublé (2018)
- Sorrows – Bryson Tiller (2020)
- Vol. 1 – Chris Botti (2023)

== Awards and nominations ==
- Member of the Order of Canada (1988)
- Member of the Order of British Columbia (1995)
- Honorary doctorate University of Victoria (1995)
- Canadian Music Hall of Fame Inductee (1998)
- Canadian Walk of Fame Inductee (2002)
- Honorary doctorate of Music Berklee College of Music (2002)
- Officer of the Order of Canada (2006)
- Horatio Alger Award Inductee (2009)
- Songwriters Hall of Fame Inductee (2010)
- Hollywood Walk of Fame Star (2013) (located near the Capitol Records Building)
- the Humanitarian Award by the Canadian Academy of Recording Arts and Sciences (2019)
- Governor General Performing Arts Awards (2022)
- Canadian Songwriters Hall of Fame Inductee (2022)
- Kennedy Center Honoree (2026)

Foster has won 16 Grammy Awards, including three Producer of the Year and has been nominated a total of 47 times.

He has been nominated three times for an Academy Award for Best Original Song and won the 1999 Golden Globe Award for Best Original Song for the song "The Prayer" (performed by Andrea Bocelli and Celine Dion) from the film Quest for Camelot.

He has been named a "BMI Icon". He was also nominated for a Drama Desk Award for composing the music for Boop! the Musical.

Business positions
Preceded by Tommy LiPuma	Chairman of Verve Music Group; December 15, 2011 – present	Succeeded by incumbent
