= Airplay (band) =

American band

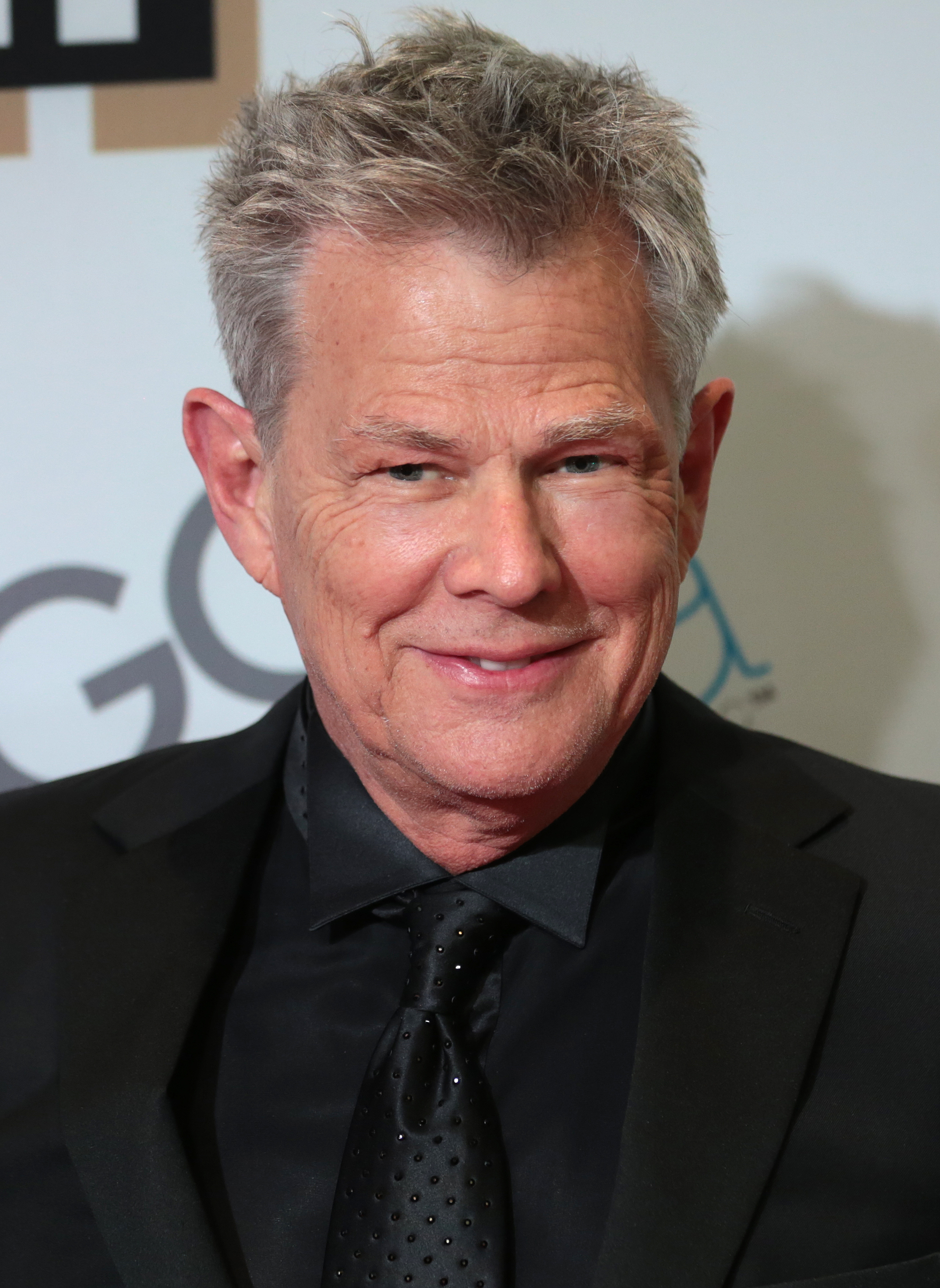
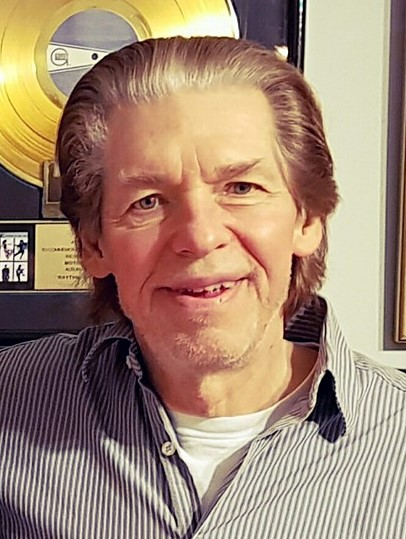
- David Foster (left, 2017) and Jay Graydon (right, 2019)

Background information
- Origin: U.S.
- Genres: Rock
- Years active: 1980
- Label: RCA
- Past members: Jay Graydon; David Foster; Tommy Funderburk

Airplay was an American band, formed by David Foster and Jay Graydon. The band released a self-titled album in 1980, containing "Nothin' You Can Do About It" (originally recorded by the Manhattan Transfer, written by Foster and Graydon with Steve Kipner) and the original recording of the Earth, Wind & Fire hit "After the Love Has Gone", written by Foster and Graydon with Bill Champlin.

Graydon was asked about Airplay in a 2014 interview:

Did you guys ever envision Airplay becoming a full-time, touring type of band? David wanted to tour and I didn't. A dumb move on my part.

== Personnel ==
=== Principal members ===
- Jay Graydon – vocals, guitar
- David Foster – keyboards, background vocals
- Tommy Funderburk – vocals
- Bill Champlin – vocals

=== Backing musicians ===
Toto members

- Jeff Porcaro – drums
- David Hungate – bass
- Steve Lukather – additional rhythm guitars
- Steve Porcaro – synthesizer programming

Others

- Mike Baird – drums
- Ray Parker Jr. – additional rhythm guitars
- Pete Robinson – synthesizer programming
- Jerry Hey – trumpet & flugelhorn
- Gary Grant – trumpet
- Steve Madaio – trumpet
- Bill Reichenbach Jr. – trombone
- Charlie Loper – trombone
- Lew McCreary – trombone

Background vocals

- Tom Kelly
- Max Gronenthal

== Discography ==
=== Studio albums ===
- Airplay (1980)

=== Singles ===
- "Stranded" (1980)
- "Nothin' You Can Do About It" (1980)
- "Should We Carry On" (1981)
- "Stressed Out (Close to the Edge)" on St. Elmo's Fire soundtrack (1985)
