= Larry Weir production discography =

Larry Anthony Weir (born 1952), is a managing editor and author at New Music Weekly. A guitarist, composer, producer and promoter, Weir is most notable for his work with his brother Michael Damian and his compositions for the movie Teen Witch (1989). A songwriter under both ASCAP and BMI, Weir has 395 BMI published works and an unknown number of ASCAP titles.

== Charted singles ==
Larry Weir on Billboard Charts
Year	Single	Credit	_{Hot 100}	_{AC}	_{Hot Dance}
1981	"She Did It"	Produced by: Larry Weir, Michael Damian	69		
1989	"Cover Of Love"	Written by: Janine Jae Best, Troy Kent Johnston, Larry Weir, Michael Damian	31		
1989	"Rock On" (From Dream A Little Dream)	Produced by: Larry Weir, Michael Damian	1		
1989	"Was It Nothing At All"	Written by: Michael Damian; Produced by: Larry Weir, Michael Damian	25	7	
1990	"Straight From My Heart"	Written by: Larry Weir, Tom Weir and Michael (Damian) Weir		47	
1991	"What A Price To Pay"	Written by: Larry Weir	60		
1992	"(There'll Never Be) Another You"	Written by: Larry Weir		26	
2002	"Shadows In The Night"	Written by: Larry Weir, Michael Damian			5
2009	"Rock On" (2009)	(Weir Brothers') Caption Records		28	

Co-produced by Larry Weir, Michael Damian's cover of, David Essex' song, Rock On reached the #1 position on the Billboard magazine Hot 100 chart in 1989.

== Discography ==
Larry Weir: Composer / Producer on disc
Year	Title	Type	Label	Capacity
1968	"Boy It’s All In Your Head"	Vinyl Single		Primary artist, Composer, Guitar
1975	"Gypsies From Bonsall"	Vinyl LP	KGB-FM; KGB Homegrown III	Composer, guitar, Vocals (Background)
1975	The Weirz	Vinyl LP	Bonsall Records	Composer, producer, Guitar, Vocals (Background)
1979	The Weirz	Vinyl LP	Bonsall Records	Composer, producer, Guitar, Vocals (Background)
1981	She Did It; Billboard Hot 100 #69	Vinyl Single	Laufer's LEG	Producer, Musician
1982	The Weirz Tonight	Vinyl LP	Parallel Records And Tapes	Composer, guitar, Vocals (Background)
1983	The Weirz Imagination	Vinyl Single	Curb Records	Composer, guitar, Vocals (Background)
1984	The Weirz Runaway	Vinyl Single	Curb Records	Composer, guitar, Vocals (Background)
1984	Love is a Mystery * “She’s In A Different World”	Vinyl	Columbia Records	Composer
1989	Where Do We Go From Here "Cover of Love" US #31, "Was It Nothing At All" US #24 US AC #27, "Straight From My Heart" US AC #47 (credited as Larry Damian in 1990)	Vinyl LP, CASS	A&M	Composer, producer
1990	Lori Ruso Show Off	CASS, CD (39:17)	Gold Castle, Capitol	Producer, keyboards
1990	Original Soundtrack Dream a Little Dream; Billboard 200 #94	CASS, CD (34:46)	Pop-us., Cypress Records, A&M	Producer
1992	With Love From The Soaps	CASS, CD (47:11)	Quality Music	Composer, producer
1993	Michael Damian Reach out to Me	CASS, CD (38:23)	Scotti Brothers (1993); Zomba(1998)	Producer, engineer, Keyboards, Vocals (Background)
1993	Lucie Arnaz Just in Time	CD	Concord Jazz	Composer
1994	Michael Damian Time of the Season "Never Walk Away" US #24, US AC #7 (BMI Work #1940354)	CASS, CD (41:52)	Wildcat Records (UNI); Wild Cat (Indie)	Composer, producer, Vocals (Background)
1994	Santo Cachon Los Embajadores Vallenatos	CASS, CD (43:19)	Vedisco	Producer, Vocals (Background)
1995	Original TV Soundtrack Saved by the Bell	CASS, CD (25:55)	Kid Rhino / Rhino	Composer
1995	Original Soundtrack Raffle	CD (50:28)	Quality Music	Composer
2003	Michael Damian Shadows in the Night	CD (19:51)	Modern Voices (2003); Bcd (2005)	Composer, producer
2007	Buck McCoy Top Dog	CD (46:03)	Caption Records	Composer, producer, Management, Keyboards, Vocals (Background)
2007	Teen Witch the Musical; Singles: Finest Hour, Popular Girl	CD (47:26)	Caption Records	Producer, composer, Keyboards, Lyricist, Programming, Vocals
2007	Official Soundtrack Moondance Alexander	CD (46:41)	Caption Records	Producer, composer, Percussion, Vocals (Background)

== Filmography ==
Dream a Little Dream Original Soundtrack spent 10 weeks on the Billboard 200 and peaked at # 94.

Something Special Patty Duke Willy/Milly (Performed by: Michael Damian)

- Released: 1986
- Format: VHS
- Writer: Larry Weir
- Producer: Larry Weir, Tom Weir
- Tracks: "One Change in My Life"

Return to Horror High (Performed by: Pleasant Company)

- Released: 1987
- Format: VHS/DVD
- Label: Published by St. Cecilia Music, Fourteen Ninety-Two Music, Warner-Tamerlande Publishing Corp., BMI
- Writer: Larry Weir
- Producer: Larry Weir, Tom Weir
- Tracks: "Greet the Teacher", "Scary Movies"

Dream a Little Dream Original Soundtrack (Performed by: Blue Future, Michael Damian)

- Released: 1989
- Format: CD
- Label: A&M
- Writer: Larry Weir ("Rock On" Written by, David Essex)
- Producer: Larry Weir, Tom Weir, Michael Damian
- Chart position: Billboard 200 #94 (May 6, 1989)
- Tracks: "Where Is She?", "Rock On"

"Teen Witch" (Performed by: The Weirz and various artists) from the album Original soundtrack was not released

- Released: 1989
- Format: VHS, DVD
- Writer: Larry Weir (co-writers include Tom Weir, Cindy Valentine, Cathy Car)
- Producer: Larry Weir, Tom Weir
- Tracks: "All Washed Up", "Dream Lover", "Finest Hour", "High School Blues", "I Keep On Falling", "I Like Boys", "Get Up and Move", "Much Too Much", "Never Gonna Be the Same Again", "Popular Girl", "Shame", "Top That"

The Raffle (Performed by: Michael Damian)

- Released: 1994
- Format: VHS, DVD, CD
- Label: Quality Music
- Writer: Larry Weir, Masika Swain Weir
- Tracks: "Think About Me"

Teen Witch the Musical (Performed by: Various artists)

- Released: 1989
- Format: CD
- Writer: Larry Weir (co-writers include Tom Weir, Cindy Valentine, Cathy Car)
- Producer: Larry Weir, Tom Weir
- Tracks: "All Washed Up", "Dream Lover", "Finest Hour", "High School Blues", "I Keep On Falling", "I Like Boys", "Get Up and Move", "Much Too Much", "Never Gonna Be the Same Again", "Popular Girl", "Shame", "Top That"
- Bonus tracks: "She's Put A Spell On You", "Fool For Love", "What Are You Doing About Love?"
- Singles: "Finest Hour" (Sara Niemietz, Black Ewing), "Popular Girl" (Sara Niemietz, V-Style)

Moondance Alexander (Performed by: Various Artists)

- Released: 2007
- Format: DVD, CD
- Label: Caption Records
- Writer: Larry Weir
- Producer: Larry Weir, Tom Weir
- Tracks: "Call It a Day", "It Only Gets Better", "You Don't Know", "It Only Takes One", "What Might Have Been", "Better Kind of Life"

"Michael Damian Rock On [Video]" from the album Rock On

- Released: 2009
- Format: DVD
- Label: Caption Records
- Writer: Larry Weir and various
- Producer: Larry Weir, Tom Weir, Michael Damian
- Tracks: "Never Forget You" (Larry Weir), "Was It Nothing at All" (Michael Damian), "Still Mad About You" (Larry Weir), "Getting So Much Better" (Michael Damian / Larry Weir), "Getting So Much Better" (Michael Damian / Larry Weir), "Shadows in the Night" (Larry Weir), "Christmas Time Without You" (Michael Damian / Larry Weir)
