= Larry Weir =

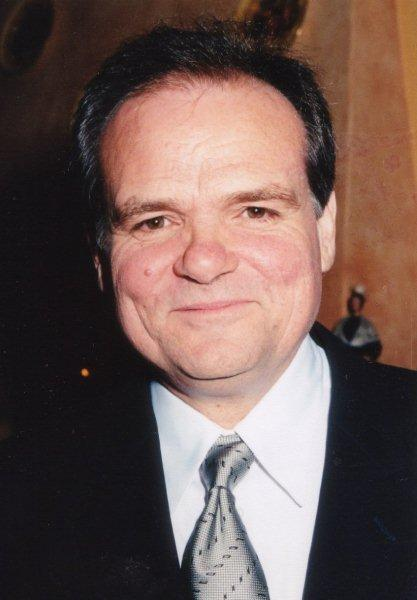

Background information
- Born: Larry Anthony Weir; April 11, 1952 (age 74)
- Origin: San Diego, California, U.S.
- Genres: Adult Contemporary, Soundtrack
- Occupations: Composer, producer, editor at NMW Magazine
- Instruments: Guitar, piano, vocals
- Years active: 1967–present
- Labels: Caption Records; Studio City Sound
- Website: larryweir.com

Larry Anthony Weir (born April 11, 1952) is an American songwriter, composer, producer, promoter and managing editor of New Music Weekly magazine. Weir is best known for songs in the musical Teen Witch (1989), which has become an annual Halloween tradition on several television networks.

== Early life ==
Namesake to his father, Larry Weir is the eldest of nine children born to Larry and Maria Weir. Weir's father was an architect/builder and Maria is a teacher and classical pianist.

In 1967, Weir was influenced by composers, Burt Bacharach, Jimmy Webb and the Beatles. A guitar player and singer, Weir recruited his brother Tom and sister Maria to form The Royal Enterprise and had a San Diego area radio hit with one of his earliest compositions, "Boy It's All In Your Head" in 1968.

In 1970, the Weir family moved to Oxnard, California with Weir attending his senior year at Oxnard High School and attended two years at Ventura College. At this time, Tom, Maria and Larry founded Ventura County Youth Experimental Theatre featuring three of Weir's original musicals, "Island" (1971), "Hobos Jungle" (1972) and "House On Crossroad Alley" (1973).

The entire family participated in the Ventura theatre productions, with Larry Sr. involved in set design and construction, other family responsibilities included: choreography, casting, costumes, direction and music composition for these fully orchestrated theatre productions.

== The Weirz ==
By 1975, the Weir family was again living in San Diego County area (Bonsall, California), the band included all nine of the Weir siblings and was now called The Weirz. The San Diego radio station, KGB-FM included the Weirz song, "Gypsies From Bonsall" on the KGB HomeGrown III LP album on side one, track number four.

All nine of the musicians are brothers and sisters. Guitarist and composer Larry, the gray-beard at 23 moans, "No one can believe that we're one family." But it's true, and here they are (take a deep breath first): Maria, 22; Estelle, 21; Tom, 20; Pixie, 18; Cathy, 17; Theresa, 15; Mike, 13; and Joan 11. "Gypsies From Bonsall" is kinda autobiographical," admits Larry. "We travel to gigs in a van and a wagon--mobile gypsies. But we have our own studio at the farm where we live. You might call us a new breed of family band."

— David Plaut, KGB Homegrown III album cover.
- The KGB Homegrown III album sold in excess of 50,000 copies
- KGB-FM was Billboard's "Station of the Year" in 1974
- KGB-FM was the originator of the sports mascot, The San Diego Chicken
- It is unclear if the band was called The Weirz in 1975, the KGB Homegrown III album credits the band as The Weirs
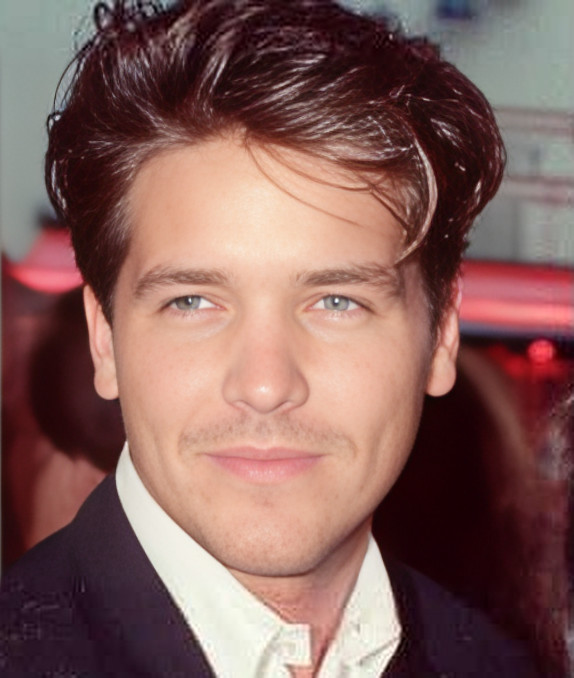
Michael Damian Weir emerged as the star of The Weirz.

"Gypsies From Bonsall", a song about a band wearing out their welcome and moving on, received generous airplay on KGB-FM in 1975. After releasing a self-titled album, the family moved to Woodland Hills, California to be closer to the recording industry. Headlining at the Starwood, the Troubadour, the Whisky a Go Go and other Los Angeles venues, Larry and Michael also concentrated on a promotional campaign for the band, Michael (Michael Damian Weir) began signing promotional letters as Michael Damian, which later became his stage name. At a performance at The Troubador, Michael was recognized from a 1981 appearance on American Bandstand, Michael was approached and agreed to play the part of a struggling singer (Danny Romalotti) on the daytime television series, The Young and the Restless. Weir also found an outlet for his songwriting, writing and arranging many of the songs that Michael Damian would perform on the television show.

The move to Woodland Hills also had a profound effect on the neighbors, on in particular was Eric Avery the son of Brian Avery who played the role of Carl Smith in the movie The Graduate. Eric Avery went on to become the bass player for Jane's Addiction, while his sister, Rebecca Avery, followed a career in acting.

Eric Avery: The Weirz inspired me to play music because they had all these instruments lying around, I was twelve years old. It was like having a musical playground literally next door. There were three different horn players, a drummer, a bass player, guitar vibes, any instrument you could think of all in this big house. I think I started on drums. One sister, Maria, was the bass player. I remember distinctly the way her amp looked. It was like the classic kind of Ampeg stack and I remember her plucking like an open E and it just rumbled to my core.

— Brendan Mullen, "Whores: An Oral Biography of Perry Farrell And Jane's Addiction"

In 1981, Michael Damian (Weir), hit the Billboard Hot 100 at #69 with Eric Carmen's "She Did It", and signed a record deal with CBS records Canada in 1983. The CBS deal produced two albums:

- Love is a Mystery (1984, Columbia, PCC-90710, produced by Larry, Tom and Michael Damian Weir)
- Michael Damian (1986, CBS Direct, DMB1-080, produced by Larry and Tom Weir)

"She's in a Different World" and "What Are You Looking For", were hit singles from each album respectively, producing tours with the Weirz as the opening act. Michael Damian's cover of, David Essex' song, Rock On reached the #1 position on the Billboard magazine Hot 100 chart in 1989.

The Weirz signed with Curb Records in 1983, first releasing singles in Europe, followed by a single, "Imagination", which led to American Bandstand and Dance Fever appearances in the United States. The Weirz played their last tour in 1987, as the opening act for the Canadian release of the Michael Damian album.

- Larry Weir (Guitar, Keyboards)
- Maria Weir (Bass, Cello)
- Estelle Weir (Keyboards)
- Tom Weir (Drums, Keyboards)
- Pixie Weir (Trombone, Flute)
- Cathy Weir (Trumpet)
- Theresa Weir (Saxophone, Guitar)
- Michael (Damian) Weir (Keyboards)
- Joan Weir (Percussion)

== The Weir Brothers ==
With Michael Damian Weir as a regular on The Young and the Restless, Weir was writing songs for Damian to perform as an artist and also as the Danny Romalotti character on the television show. In a Los Angeles Times interview, Damian explains the dynamics, "My character was a starving singer who was working as a waiter--which was what I was doing at the time," he recalled. "As my recording career developed, so did my role on 'The Young and the Restless.' When Michael Damian had a No. 1 single, so did Danny Romalotti."

Larry Weir on Billboard Charts
Year	Single	Credit	_{Hot 100}	_{AC}	_{Hot Dance}
1981	"She Did It"	Written by Eric Carmen; Produced by: Larry Weir, Michael Damian, Tom Weir	69		
1989	"Cover Of Love"	Written by: Janine Jae Best, Troy Kent Johnston, Larry Weir, Michael Damian	31		
1989	"Rock On" (From Dream A Little Dream)	Written by: David Essex; Produced by: Larry Weir, Michael Damian, Tom Weir	1		
1989	"Was It Nothing At All"	Written by: Michael Damian; Produced by: Larry Weir, Michael Damian, Tom Weir	25	7	
1990	"Straight From My Heart"	Written by: Larry Weir, Tom Weir and Michael (Damian) Weir		47	
1991	"What A Price To Pay"	Written by: Larry Weir	60		
1992	"(There'll Never Be) Another You"	Written by: Larry Weir		26	
2002	"Shadows In The Night"	Written by: Larry Weir, Michael Damian			5
2009	"Rock On" (2009)	Written by: David Essex (Weir Brothers') Caption Records		28	

=== Television ===
A collaboration between Alf Clausen, Larry Weir, Michael Damian, Rich Eames, Robin Gibb, Scott Gale and Tom Weir produced the theme song for the television series Saved By the Bell (1989 to 1993).

Larry Weir and Tom Weir teamed up with Michael Parnell to score 34 episodes of the 1991-93 television show, Dangerous Curves, starring Lisa Cutter and Michael Michele.

=== Weir Brothers Recording Studios ===
The Weir Brothers Recording Studios is added to the musical credits in the late 1980s and early 1990s. Some of the titles written or co-written by Larry and with Weir family members producing, and performing at Weir Brothers Recording Studios are:

- Teen Witch (1989 movie)
- Dreams of Summer (Single: "Was It Nothing At All" (1989) AC #7)
- Where Do We Go From Here (Single: "Where Do We Go From Here" (1989) Billboard 200 #61)
- Reach Out To Me (1993)
- Time Of The Season (1994)

Trivia

- The single, "Reach Out To Me"", from the album Reach Out To Me, attained Top 20 on The Gavin Report in 1993.
- The 1996 single, "Never Walk Away", from Time Of The Season, became a Top 10 hit in The Gavin Report's Adult Contemporary Chart.
- Masika Swaim is credited with as a backup vocalist on Reach Out To Me, Masika Swaim and Larry Weir were married in 1993.
- Grammy Award winner, Tom Weir now specializes in recording, engineering and mixing as the owner and operator of Studio City Sound.

=== Weir Brothers Entertainment ===
Weir Brothers Entertainment
Title	Primary Artist	Date	Tracks!
Marley & Me The Puppy Years (music from and inspired by the motion picture)	Various Artists	9.Aug.2011	12 tracks
Little Marley & Me	Michael Damian	8.Aug.2011	1 track
Flicka 2 Original Motion Picture Soundtrack	Various Artists	4.May.2010	13 tracks
Girl To Change Your World - The Remixes	Heather Youmans	17.Mar.2010	2 tracks
Girl To Change Your World	Heather Youmans	4.Jan.2010	1 track
Rock On	Michael Damian	31.Mar.2009	11 tracks
Getting So Much Better	Michael Damian	4.Mar.2008	3 tracks
I Choose You (from the Moondance Alexander soundtrack)	Laura Wight	3.Sep.2007	3 tracks
Popular Girl (from Teen Witch the Musical)	Sara Niemietz	3.Jul.2007	3 tracks
Top Dog	Buck McCoy	6.Jun.2007	12 tracks
Teen Witch The Musical	Various Artists	13.Feb.2007	14 tracks
Finest Hour (from Teen Witch the Musical)	Sara Niemietz w/ Blake Ewing	30.Jan.2007	3 tracks

== National Record Promotion ==
=== Radio Promotion ===
National Record Promotions (NRP), is service company that provides acceptance testing for new music in secondary radio markets. Modeled after the Gavin report, record labels and independent artists employ the service to gather regional analytic data for their songs, side by side with the top ranking hits of the day. In 2011, Real II Reel Productions named National Record Promotions, "... the #1 independent record promoter in the country ..."

National Record Promotion clients:

- Akon
- Herb Alpert
- America
- Alina Artts
- Matt Backer
- Peabo Bryson
- Chubby Checker
- Cy Curnin / The Fixx
- Michael Damian
- Frank D'Angelo
- Jackie DeShannon
- Lee Dewyze
- Lamont Dozier
- Flo Rida
- Jerry Garcia Band
- Lani Hall
- Heartland
- James Ingram
- Inner Circle
- Mick Jagger
- Marsha Jewell
- Shawn King
- Florence LaRue
- Julian Lennon
- Taj Mahal
- Janice Marie
- Buck McCoy
- Bill Medley
- Willie Nelson
- Ray Obiedo
- Player
- Jessica Riddle
- Tommy Roe
- Melvin Seals
- Romeo Santos
- Bruce Sudano
- Marshall Tucker
- Billy Vera
- Crystal Waters
- Danny Wood / New Kids on the Block

In 1998, New Music Weekly magazine was created in partnership with promoter Paul Loggins, the owner of Spins Tracking System. New Music Weekly is a trade magazine that digests music industry news and evaluates Spins Tracking System data from some 400 National subscriber radio stations.

In the mid-1990s, Weir found that music production and radio promotion tasks overlap and that he had become adept in both functions. Weir had found that some promoters were less than truthful about accomplishing their contract obligations. In 1995, Weir created National Record Promotion (NRP), a streamlined promotional service for musicians and labels who may not have dedicated promotional staff. Weir and co-owner Masika Swaim, have a personal relationship with NRP subscriber radio stations, contacting each radio station by telephone on a weekly basis. Ultimately, the critique of the promoted music is determined by the radio professionals and listener feedback, which drives the "spin" count of a promoted song. Requests from listeners, acceptance by programming managers and disc-jockeys will likely improve the number of spins per week. Feedback, in terms of number of spins and comparative chart positions, is reported back to the artist or label by the Spins Tracking System. Songs with outstanding audience appeal, as determined by the number of spins or rapid elevations in chart rankings, are noted in New Music Weekly magazine regardless to the artist's choice of promoters.

One perceived limitation of modern radio promotion, is that some radio stations are located in small radio markets. In most cases, large-market radio stations (Top 40) are run from pre-programmed lists and music rotation decisions occur at a distant corporate offices. In effect, radio stations with rigid programming formats provide little insight into listener preference and determining marketability of new music.

=== Artists Management ===
Weir's, Artists Management Firm, represents Buck McCoy and Heather Youmans in close affiliation with Studio City Sound.
