= Marley & Me: The Puppy Years =

- Promotional poster
- Directed by: Michael Damian
- Written by: Michael Damian; Janeen Damian
- Based on: Characters by John Grogan
- Produced by: Connie Dolphin
- Starring: Travis Turner; Donnelly Rhodes
- Cinematography: Ron Stannett
- Edited by: Seth Flaum
- Music by: Mark Thomas
- Production company: Regency Enterprises
- Distributed by: 20th Century Fox Home Entertainment
- Release date: June 1, 2011
- Running time: 86 minutes
- Country: United States
- Language: English

Marley & Me: The Puppy Years (originally titled Marley & Me: The Terrible 2's) is a 2011 American direct-to-video comedy film that serves as an intermediate follow-up to Marley & Me (2008). The film was directed by Michael Damian and written by Damian and his wife Janeen Damian. The film was released on DVD by 20th Century Fox Home Entertainment on June 1, 2011.

As the title suggests, the film is about Marley in his puppy years. Marley and his owner's nephew Bodi Grogan (Travis Turner) cause trouble at the local dog contest. Unlike the original film however, Marley is given a speaking voice (voiced by Grayson Russell).

== Plot ==
Marley is a puppy, and according to some people he is "the world's worst dog". While taking care of Marley, Bodi Grogan has to stay with his grandfather, Fred Grogan because his mother, Carol, is on a business trip. So Bodi stays with Marley in his grandfather's house. His grandfather is strict about chores and pushes him around a lot.

One day, while on a walk with Marley (Bodi on his skateboard), Bodi meets a girl named Kaycee. They chat for a while, then she tells him about a puppy championship. Kaycee, whose parents own a pug rescue center, enters three of her pugs in the contest so she can get money for the center.

Kaycee suggests Bodi enter Marley in the contest. However, as the rules stipulate a team must have three dogs, she tells Bodi about Mrs. Crouch, who has two other lab puppies, named Fuschia and Moose. Together, all three of them train for a course.

Meanwhile, elsewhere, Hans Von Weiselberger is being cruel to his three puppies, Turbo, Liesl and Axel by using voltage collars on them. If they are not behaving the way he wants, they get shocked. His three puppies were last year's puppy champions, and so Hans wanted to make them even better.

The day before the competition, Bodi sends his pups for a day at the spa. However, after the pups finish, a man wearing a spa worker's uniform takes them, along with an Australian Shepherd dog named Dundee, who was also part of the competition. The evil man is Henkle, Hans's assistant. He locks the four of them away with two big German Shepherds, Trouble and Chipper, who were pretending to eat the pups.

The pups get scared, but the shepherds say that they were only messing with them. They help them escape by using a seesaw which they made: one pup would be on one side while one of the shepherds would jump onto the other so that the pup would fly. All four escape and return to Bodi's home very dirty. He cleans all four of them and Grandpa calls Dundee's owner, so he goes home.

The next day the championship starts. Everyone does well, but in the middle Marley gets distracted. When the prizes are announced, Bodi is upset because he did not win. Initially, Hans was in the first place, but Marley saves the day. A cat named Cat snips all of Hans's dogs' collars, then Marley takes one collar and puts it in Hans' pocket.

When the pups don't obey, Hans turns the collars on, getting an electric shock himself. His remote, which controlled the collars, falls out of his pocket and the judge sees it. He is hence disqualified. The new results are first place for the Australian dogs and second place for Kaycee's pugs.

As Marley saved the day, Bodi gets a prize for good sportsmanship. Bodi, in the middle of the competition, sees his mother and is surprised. His mother, who thought he was irresponsible, sees that he is happy with Marley. He couldn't keep Marley because it was his relative's dog.

However, the three dogs who belonged to Hans are not his anymore: one family adopts Liesl and Axel, but Turbo, the last one, was going to be taken to the dog shelter. Bodi's mother lets him keep him, as she believes Bodi is ready to own a dog.

== Cast ==
- Travis Turner as Bodi Grogan: A boy who kept asking his mother, Carol, to get him a puppy, until in the end he did.
- Donnelly Rhodes as Fred Grogan: Bodi's kind but firm grandfather.
- Alex Zahara as Hans Von Weiselberger: An evil German man who was cruel to his dogs.
- Geoff Gustafson as Henkle: One of Hans' helpers.
- Sydney Imbeau as Kaycee: A kind girl who loves pugs and whose parents have a pug rescue center.
- Chelah Horsdal as Carol Grogan: Bodi's mom. At first she thought that Bodi wasn't ready for a dog but thinks he is at the end.
- Merrilyn Gann as Mrs. Crouch: The owner of Fuchsia and Moose, who team up with Marley.
- Garry Chalk as Announcer
- Grayson Russell as the voice of Marley
- Kathryn Kirkpatrick as Judge Luckett
- Marie West as Helga, another one of Hans' helpers who is attracted to Henkle.
- Keith Dallas as Mike
- Alexander Matthew Marr as Turbo
- Lauren Lavoie as Fuchsia
- Ryan Grantham as Moose
- Kyle Kirkwood as Axel
- Jianna Ballard as Liesl
- Ashlyn Drummond as Godiva
- Christopher Goodman as Cat
- Gordon Grice as Dundee
- Brian Drummond as Trouble
- Lee Tockar as Chipper
- Olivia Krevoy as Jazzy

== Soundtrack ==
Marley & Me: The Puppy Years – Music from and Inspired by the Motion Picture

- Released: August 9, 2011
- Format: LP/Digital
- Label: Weir Brothers Entertainment
- Producer: Larry Weir, Tom Weir & Michael Damian

No.	Title	Writer(s)	Performed by:	Length
1.	"Little Marley & Me"	Larry Weir	Michael Damian	4:18
2.	"The Way We Roll"	Michael Damian, Travis Turner & Michael Parnell	Travis Turner	3:16
3.	"Just About to Change Your World"	Heather Youmans, Larry Weir	Heather Youmans	3:46
4.	"Get Ready Set Go"	Larry Weir	Michael Damian Feat. V-Style	3:13
5.	"Good to Be Me"	Larry Weir	Heather Youmans	3:56
6.	"With You"	Larry Weir	Holly Kay	3:01
7.	"Close to Me"	Larry Weir	Heather Youmans	4:08
8.	"Romeo"	Heather Youmans, Larry Weir	Heather Youmans	3:01
9.	"You Make Me Happy"	Tonisha Weaver, Steve	Tonisha Weaver	3:56
10.	"Summertime"	QT5	QT5	2:46
11.	"Fallin' Deeper"	Jon MacLennan	Jon MacLennan	3:09
12.	"Top Dog"	Buck McCoy	Buck McCoy	4:19
