= Studio City Sound =

American recording studio

Coordinates: 34.153633°N 118.40513°W

Studio City Sound is a recording studio located in Studio City, California. Grammy Award winning mixer, Tom Weir, purchased Fidelity Studios from Artie Ripp in 2002 and has updated and operated the facility as Studio City Sound since that time. Weir's additional credits include, engineer, producer, mastering/remastering, composer, keyboards and programming, drums and vocals. Studio City Sound has three recording studios, configured with a blend of digital and analog recording equipment. Clients can monitor recording and mixing sessions via the Internet courtesy of Studio City Sound's, Telos Zephyr, ISDN capabilities.

== Artists who have used Studio City Sound ==
- Famous Dex
- Trippie Redd
- Juicy J
- T.I.
- A-Trak
- D.R.A.M.
- Louis the Child
- Nelly
- The Strokes
- The Struts
- Soulja Boy
- MØ
- Martin Solveig
- Niia
- Quadron
- Hayley Kiyoko
- The Monkees
- Rod Stewart
- Kelly Clarkson
- Eric Benét
- Meghan Trainor
- Nightmare and the Cat
- Ray Luzier
- Chris Cornell
- Andreas Carlsson
- Warren G
- Robby Krieger
- Crooked X
- Tom Morello
- No Doubt
- Pete Yorn
- Keith Richards
- Eric Clapton
- Graham Nash
- Willie Nelson
- Ryan Adams
- Trey Anastasio
- Shaggy
- Orianthi
- The Roots
- Bunny Wailer
- Rahzel
- Rachael Yamagata
- Jessica Harper
- JeA
- Burning Brides
- Ronn Moss
- Jason Freese
- Billy Burke
- Bonnie Raitt
- Chicago
- Mary-Kate Olsen
- Doris Roberts
- David A. Stewart
- Josh Freese
- Ultravox
- Rashid Lanie
- EMI
- Steve Martin
- Heather Youmans
- Jon MacLennan
- Khaled
- King Sunny Adé
- Kailash Kher
- Interscope
- Capitol Records
- Geffen Records
- Wilmer Valderrama
- Michaela Shiloh
- Cindy Alexander
- Exene Cervenka
- Toots and The Maytals
- Phantom Planet
- John Oszajca
- Brian Setzer
- Scarlett Pomers
- Tito Jackson
- Michael Damian
- Maya Rudolph
- Carina Round
- Mighty Mo Rodgers
- Jim Keltner
- Gary Sinise
- The Go-Go's
- Weezer
- Dave Darling
- Tom Whitlock
- Danielle Brisebois
- Autograph
- Jason Schwartzman
- Faith Evans
- Lee Ann Womack
- Katrina Carlson
- Juke Kartel
- Delaney Bramlett
- Buzzcocks
- Meredith Brooks
- Lisa Loeb
- Carmelite Sisters of the Most Sacred Heart of Los Angeles
- Liel Kolet
- Andranik Madadian
- Nelson
- System of a Down
- Verne Troyer
- GM Voices
- LMFAO
- Wailing Souls
- Neil Peart
- Limp Bizkit
- Natasha Bedingfield
- Alanis Morissette
- Boxing Gandhis
- MC Hammer
- Gary Myrick
- Kevin Coleman
- Q'Viva! The Chosen Live
- Johnny Mathis
- Edward Asner
- Blondie
- Tracy Byrd
- Pam Tillis
- Matt Laug
- Mel Torme
- Up All Night
- Tajči
- Surfdog Records
- A&M Records
- Universal Studios
- Rounder Records
- Moondance Alexander
- Rooney
- Daren Kagasoff
- Tim Pierce
- Runner Runner
- Loomis Fall
- Buddy Miles
- Toots Hibbert
- Biffy Clyro
- Gary Wright
- Kyosuke Himuro
- Player
- Wicked
- George Watsky
- Flicka 2
- A Princess for Christmas
- The Young and the Restless
- The Bold and the Beautiful

Studio City Sound roster of session musicians:

- Josh Freese – drums
- Matt Laug – drums
- Luis Conte – percussionist
- Tim Pierce – guitar
- Paul Bushnell – bass guitar
- Lance Morrison - bass guitar
- Nick Lane – trombone and brass arrangements
- Steve Madaio – trumpet and brass arrangements
- Blues Saraceno – guitar
- Jon MacLennan- guitar, banjo, mandolin, ukulele, vocals and backing-vocals
