= The Sweeter Side of Life =

- Poster art for The Sweeter Side of Life
- Genre: Romantic comedy
- Written by: Janeen Damian; Michael Damian
- Directed by: Michael Damian
- Starring: Kathryn Morris; James Best
- Theme music composer: Mark Thomas
- Country of origin: United States
- Original language: English

Production
- Executive producers: Francisco J. González; Brad Krevoy; Reuben Liber; Jimmy Townsend
- Producers: Janeen Damian; Michael Damian
- Cinematography: Viorel Sergovici
- Editors: Seth Flaum; Ovidiu Vacaru
- Running time: 90 minutes
- Production companies: Motion Picture Corporation of America; Riviera Films

Original release
- Network: Hallmark Channel
- Release: January 19, 2013

The Sweeter Side of Life is a 2013 American made-for-television romantic comedy film starring Kathryn Morris and James Best. The film was co-written and co-produced by Michael Damian and his wife Janeen Damian. The Sweeter Side of Life is the seventh film by the husband and wife team; continuing in the family film genre, and with family involvement, James Best, Janeen Damian's father, plays the father of the protagonist. Michael Damian's newest single, "Rock My Heart", is also featured in the film.

== Plot ==
A pampered Manhattanite, Desiree Harper (Morris), is shunned from her circle of well-heeled friends when her husband, Wade Harper (Stephen Hogan), a successful plastic surgeon, announces he wants a divorce. The terms of her prenuptial agreement leaves her penniless, so she returns to her family home in Flemington, New Jersey, to live with her father, Paddy Kerrigan (Best), where she helps with the family business, a bakery. Alienated from her roots and emotionally unavailable to love-interest, Benny Christophe (Alastair Mackenzie), a life as a baker is unacceptable to Desiree.

Desiree discovers that the bakery is also having financial difficulties; she develops a gourmet cupcake that becomes wildly popular, bringing success to the bakery and franchising offers from Corporate America. Desiree is faced with the ultimatum of selling out her father in order to return to her former lifestyle. Desiree finds that her re-emergence into the real-world has affected her sensibilities, she is now capable of consideration for others and receptive to a new relationship with Benny.

== Cast ==
- Kathryn Morris as Desiree Harper
- James Best as Paddy Kerrigan
- Alastair Mackenzie as Benny Christophe
- Steve Varnom as Eddie Rubinski
- Sam Douglas as Dino Ravettino
- Stephen Hogan as Wade Harper
- Jerome Holder as Calvin

== Production ==
Janeen Damian is known for her 2007 feature film Moondance Alexander. Michael Damian is primarily known for his role as Danny Romalotti on the daytime television series The Young and the Restless, playing the character of Joseph in the Broadway revival of Joseph and the Amazing Technicolor Dreamcoat and a successful singing career featuring musical backing by his eight siblings.

The Sweeter Side of Life was originally entitled Confections of a Discarded Woman; participation of Kathryn Morris and Motion Picture Corporation of America was announced by Variety on March 30, 2012.

The Sweeter Side of Life is set in New York City, New York and Flemington, New Jersey. Filming occurred in New York City and at Castel Film Studios in Bucharest, Romania.

== Release ==
The Sweeter Side of Life premiered on the Hallmark Channel on January 19, 2013.
