= Heather Youmans =

American singer-songwriter

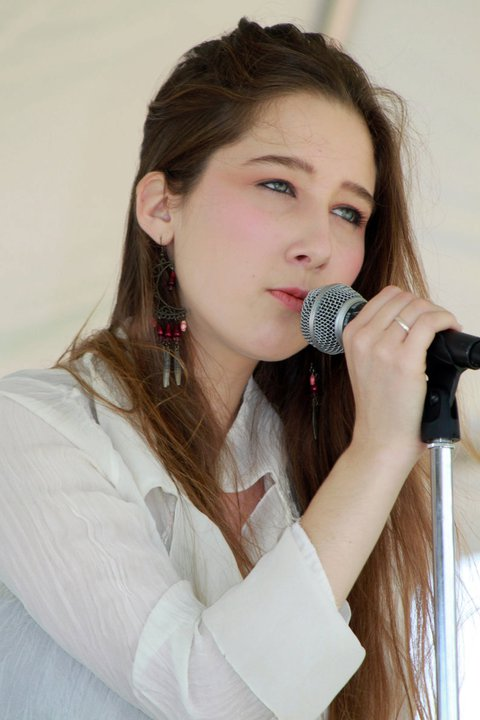

Background information
- Born: Heather Anne Youmans; May 16, 1992 (age 34); Vista, California, U.S.
- Genres: Rock, pop, country, soul
- Occupations: Singer-songwriter, entertainer, journalist, publicist
- Years active: 2002–present
- Labels: Caption Records; Weir Brothers Entertainment; Suspicious Love Productions
- Website: www.heatheryoumans.com

Heather Youmans (born May 16, 1992) is an American dancer and singer-songwriter known for her soundtrack work on the feature films, Moondance Alexander (2007), Flicka 2 (2010) and Marley & Me: The Puppy Years (2011). Youmans recently appeared on I Can See Your Voice episode 4 (FOX), other live performances include a UNICEF benefit opening solo ahead of headliners Sting and Natalie Cole in 2005, a National Anthem performance for the Los Angeles Kings on New Year's Eve 2019, and Parade magazine's, She Rocks Spotlight Series, in 2020. Her work has been featured in American Songwriter magazine, Forbes Women and Parade magazine profiled her career and music in 2020. Youmans holds an MBA and is publicist with Fender Guitars, she has written for the Los Angeles Times, and the Orange County Register.

== Early life ==
Youmans began landing theatre roles at age ten, such as Amarylis in The Music Man, Marta in The Sound of Music in 2003, as well as Nellie in Annie Get Your Gun in 2004 at the Welk Resort Theatre. In 2004, she won first place in the Del Mar TV Idol Contest, Junior Division, at age twelve. On November 30, 2005, Youmans performed an opening solo at the UNICEF Snowflake Ball at the Regent Beverly Wilshire. Headlining acts for the evening included, Sting, Chris Botti and Natalie Cole.

Youmans attended Rancho Buena Vista High School and was active in the Associated Student Body, dance and drama programs. In 2009, she won the MACY Award for Highest Achievement and Best Supporting Vocal-Female for her role as Rusty in Footloose, and Best Vocal Female in 2010 for her role as Jo in Little Women.

== Education ==
Youmans holds a B.A. in Journalism and Mass Communication with a music minor (classical and jazz vocal at Bob Cole Conservatory of Music). She graduated magna cum laude from California State University, Long Beach (CSULB) in 2013, and graduated with an MBA at CSULB with an emphasis in marketing. During her undergraduate studies, Youmans created and hosted Heartbreakers: The Women of Rock, a radio format program on KBeach.org (2011-2013).

== Career ==
In 2005, Youmans earned a voice-over part, playing Becky Thatcher in Disney's Tom Sawyer's Island and the following year, won the part of Shana the Rock Star in a pre-production musical Teen Witch the Musical (2007). These accomplishments led to featured artist performances on the soundtrack for Moondance Alexander (2007). Youmans' single, "Girl to Change Your World", was a (2011) hit on Radio Disney, and it is one of the two Youmans songs included in the film Love by Design (2014), starring Giulia Nahmany, David Oaks and Jane Seymour.

The Teen Witch the Musical project was successful in its primary goal of reproducing the missing soundtrack for the Halloween classic film Teen Witch (1989). The musical stage-play never made it out of workshop and has yet to achieve the secondary goal of becoming a viable Broadway offering. This association with Weir Brothers Productions led to additional soundtrack features in the films Moondance Alexander (2007), Flicka 2 (2010) and Marley & Me: The Puppy Years (2011).

While concurrently studying journalism and music, Youmans auditioned and stacked up credits in Southern California regional theater and wrote for national and regional newspapers on entertainment topics. She has produced and hosted an entertainment format radio show, interviewed entertainment industry legends, and ran a marketing campaign for Jon MacLennan's iBook, Melodic Expressions: The Art of the Line (2012). She works as a communications professional in Los Angeles.

=== Theatre and live performances ===
Professional performances and theatre roles
Year	Title	Role	Venue	Director/Producer
2003	The Music Man	Amarylis	Welk Resort Theatre	Lewis Wilkenfeld
2003	Sound of Music	Marta	Welk Resort Theatre	Joshua Carr
2004	Annie Get Your Gun	Nellie	Welk Resort Theatre	Jon Engstrom
2004	Annie	Orphan Sadie	La Mirada Theatre for the Performing Arts	McCoy Rigby Ent. Glenn Casale
2004	Annie Get Your Gun	Jessie	Saddleback Civic Light Opera	Sheryl Donchey
2004	To Kill a Mockingbird	Scout	West Coast Ensemble	C. Jaffe/R. Israel
2005	UNICEF Snowflake Ball	Opening Soloist	Regent Beverly Wilshire	-
2005	Tight Quarters	Lauren	Whitefire Theatre	Jules Aaron
2005	Kodak Christmas	Featured Soloist	Kodak Theatre	-
2006	Teen Witch the Musical	Shana the Rock Star	workshop	Alana Lambros
2008	New Music Weekly Awards	Featured Soloist	Avalon Theatre	-
2009	42nd Street	Ensemble	Moonlight Amphitheatre	Jon Engstrom
2010	Once Upon A Wedding	Daisy	Bahia Resort-Dinner Theatre	Laughing Tree Prod.
2010-12	Journey To The Lost Temple	Pippin	Legoland-California	Shawn Griener
2012	American Idol Season 11	Contestant	USS Midway Museum	Fox Network
2012	American Idol Season 11	Hollywood Week	Pasadena Civic Auditorium	Fox Network
2019	Jason Robert Brown In Concert	Lead singer	Cabaret at the Merc	Gerald Sternbach
2019	Evita In Concert	Ensemble	PVPA	Richard Israel
2020	HAIR	Suzannah 1000-Year-Old Monk	LGBT Center LA	Kate Sullivan Jared Stein
2020	New Year's Eve, National Anthem Singer	Soloist	Staples Center	LA Kings

=== American Idol ===
In 2012, Youmans performed "Some Kind of Wonderful" at the American Idol San Diego competition and won a golden ticket after a unanimous decision from the judges (Steven Tyler, Jennifer Lopez and Randy Jackson), which advanced her to the Hollywood Week competition. Youmans was eliminated during Hollywood Week in Season 11. She attributes the elimination to nerves and an ambitious music selection, Heart’s "Crazy on You".

=== Recorded and broadcast ===
In addition to performing in nationally televised commercials, Youmans has been involved in several cutting-edge media projects. In 2005, Youmans played the part of Becky Thatcher in Disney's Tom Sawyer's Island, a voice-over project. The performance was delivered via hand-held computers issued to visitors on Disneyland's Tom Sawyer's Island. A pilot project, titled "Available Light", was one of the first to test Sony Blu-ray camera technology.

==== Soundtracks ====
- Teen Witch the Musical (2007) original cast recording, Weir Brothers Entertainment.
- Moondance Alexander (2007) starring Kay Panabaker, Don Johnson and Lori Loughlin, 20th Century Fox Home Entertainment
- Flicka 2 (2010) starring Patrick Warburton, Tammin Sursok and Clint Black, 20th Century Fox Home Entertainment
- Marley & Me: The Puppy Years (2011) starring Travis Turner and Donnelly Rhodes, 20th Century Fox Home Entertainment
- Love by Design (2014) starring Giulia Nahmany, David Oaks and Jane Seymour, Gold Line Prod. Int.
- High Strung (2016) starring Keenan Kampa, Nicholas Galitzine, Jane Seymour, Riviera Films.

==== Singles ====
- "Girl To Change Your World" (2011)
- "Girl To Change Your World - The Remixes" (2011)
- "In My Arms" (2012)
- "My Kind of Trouble LIVE at the Recordium" (2019)
- "Is It Just Me LIVE at the Recordium" (2019)
- "Shine" (2019)
- "You Made Me Hate Love Songs LIVE at YouTube Space" (2020)
- "A Little Closer To Happy" (2021)
- "Worth It" (2021)

=== Journalism ===
Youmans writes about entertainment topics, specifically dance, music, theatre and film. Her Southern California beat includes covering venues, such as the Orange County Fair, the Newport Beach Jazz Festival, the Playboy Jazz Festival, Sunset Jazz at Newport, the Hollywood Bowl and Segerstrom Center for the Arts. Her freelance position with Freedom Communications has afforded interviews with: George Lopez, Drew Carey and Brooke Shields, Grammy Award-winning musicians David Sanborn, Jeff Hamilton for the Orange County Register, and her interview with Grammy nominee Brian McKnight was additionally published in the Los Angeles Register. Earlier interviews include, Chita Rivera for the Los Angeles Times and interviews with Ann Wilson and Martina McBride for the Los Angeles Times Media Group's Daily Pilot.
