= Jon MacLennan =

Guitarist, instructor

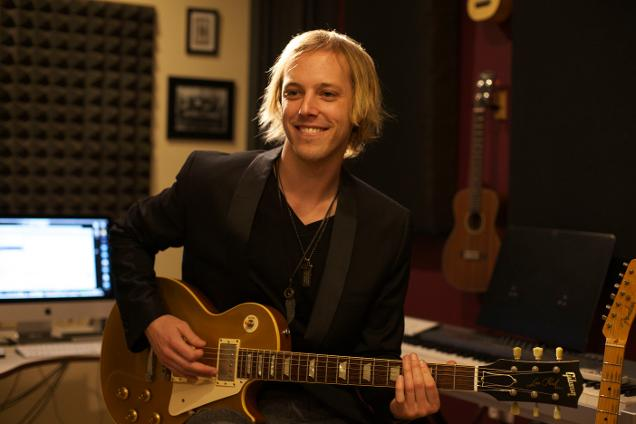

Background information
- Born: Jon Andrew MacLennan; March 23, 1987 (age 39); Tarzana, California
- Genres: Classic rock, jazz, blues, pop
- Occupations: Studio musician, composer, producer, instructor
- Years active: 2003–present
- Label: Suspicious Love Productions
- Website: www.jonmaclennan.com

Jon MacLennan is a Los Angeles-based musician, composer, producer and music educator. MacLennan's session work includes playing guitar on Julian Lennon and Steven Tyler's song, "Someday", from Lennon's album, Everything Changes (2013), and backing vocals on Jamie Cullum's album, The Pursuit (2009). He's also played guitar on songs for Holly Knight, Mark Spiro and Tim Miner. MacLennan's original song, "Fallin' Deeper", is featured in the Twentieth Century Fox film Marley & Me: The Puppy Years (2011) soundtrack. MacLennan's published works include: three self-produced albums, two instructional music iBooks, Melodic Expressions: The Art of the Line (2012), Play Ukulele (2012) and hundreds of instructional workshop videos on his YouTube channel with over 1.48 million views.

== Background ==
MacLennan began his professional music career at 16 completing session work for Grammy Award-winning mixer Tom Weir. His first album, Suspicious Love (2006) was recorded at Weir's Studio City Sound in Studio City, CA. MacLennan also secured television work with 20th Century Fox Television and the Disney Channel during his teen years. MacLennan earned a bachelor's degree in Ethnomusicology from University of California, Los Angeles (UCLA) with emphasis in jazz guitar in 2010. His mentors include: Carl Verheyen, Tim Pierce, Kenny Burrell, Jimmy Wyble, Tamir Hendelman, Ron Anthony and Wolf Marshall, the author of Hal Leonard's Wolf Marshall Guitar Method and Power Studies.

== Music education ==
- Guitar instructor for the Los Angeles Pierce College Department of Music.
- YouTube channel with over 250 videos and tutorials with over 1.4 million views.
- MacLennan is a regular contributor to GuitarControl's Play From the Heart section and also contributes to BluesGuitar.com
- When B. B. King died on May 14, 2015, The Los Angeles Times contacted MacLennan for expert insight into what is known as the "B.B. Box" in guitar instruction circles and commentary on King's style and legacy.
- Guitar World featured MacLennan's research and video-lesson into the Rolling Stones, "You Can't Always Get What You Want"; MacLennan proposes the song's intro is produced with a specifically tuned twelve-string acoustic guitar.

=== iBooks ===
Melodic Expressions is an interactive instructional iBook for advanced guitar players. The iBook contains more than 90 pages of content pertaining to different musical genres and focuses on the "...language of the music," according to MacLennan. The iBook is divided into three sections, "Major", "Minor" and "Dominant" musical phrasing with genre specific core-elements, rather than formal scales and drilled exercises. Each page includes a slow and fast tempo playback with the lead guitar in the right speaker and the pad guitar in the left speaker. After-market iPad accessories are available to enable the guitarist to plugin to the iPad directly and play along with the left, right or both tracks.

- Melodic Expressions: The Art of the Line (2012)
- Play Ukulele (2012)

=== Instructional DVDs ===
Jon has been creating instructional DVD guitar courses since 2012. Listed below are some of his top selling DVD courses.

- The Fasttrack Guitar System (2013)
- Play From the Heart (2013)
- Ukulele Secrets (2013)
- Blues Power (2014)
- Banjo Made Simple (2014)

== Filmography ==
=== Soundtracks ===
- Marley & Me: The Puppy Years – composer/performer

Soundtrack features MacLennan's single, "Fallin’ Deeper" – 20th Century Fox (2011)

- Perch (Surfing DVD) – composer/performer

Alex Knost, C.J. Nelson, Joel Tudor, Josh Farberow and Oliver Parker – Kylemacfilms (2009)

=== Television ===
- Raising Hope – ukulele and guitar

20th Century Fox Television

- The Suite Life of Zack and Cody – guitarist

"What the Hey" season 2 episode 21 – Disney Channel (2006)

== Discography ==
- Suspicious Love (2006)

Suspicious Love (album)

- Released: 2006
- Format: LP/CD/Digital
- Label: Jon MacLennan Productions
- Producer: Jon MacLennan

Tracklist: Suspicious Love _{(UPC 634479426988)}
No.	Title	Length
1.	"Suspicious Love (I think I like it)"	2:44
2.	"Good To Know"	3:39
3.	"The Fighter"	4:11
4.	"Crazy Love"	2:50
5.	"Don't Go"	3:07
6.	"Big Time"	5:02
7.	"You Don't Know"	2:57
8.	"Kind To No One Blues"	2:55
9.	"S.P.F."	2:56
10.	"On My Mind"	4:12

- Dreams (2011)

Dreams (album)

- Released: 2011
- Format: LP/Digital
- Label: Suspicious Love Productions
- Writer: Jon MacLennan
- Producer: Jon MacLennan
- Singles: "Fallin' Deeper" featured in the soundtrack Marley & Me: The Puppy Years (2011)

Tracklist: Dreams _{(UPC 885767642072)}
No.	Title	Length
1.	"Start All Over Again"	3:38
2.	"Someday"	4:30
3.	"Dreams"	3:16
4.	"Lesson Learned"	4:17
5.	"Fallin' Deeper"	3:09
6.	"Christmas Day"	3:17
7.	"Footsteps in the Sand"	3:08
8.	"Peace"	3:51
9.	"Cheating Woman Blues"	2:53
10.	"Until the End"	3:47

- Songs from Box Canyon (2013)

Songs from Box Canyon (album)

- Released: 2013
- Format: LP/Digital
- Label: Suspicious Love Productions
- Writers: Jon MacLennan, Heather Youmans
- Producer: Jon MacLennan

Tracklist: Songs from Box Canyon _{(UPC 887516928130)}
No.	Title	Writer(s)	Length
1.	"Nobody Cares When You Live in L.A"	MacLennan	3:19
2.	"New Life"	MacLennan	3:02
3.	"In My Arms" (feat. Heather Youmans)	MacLennan/Youmans	4:12
4.	"Fallin' in Love"	MacLennan	4:00
5.	"A Time and a Place"	MacLennan	2:38
6.	"Bottle of Dreams"	MacLennan	3:19
7.	"I Want You Back"	MacLennan	3:34
8.	"We Are the Future"	MacLennan	4:20
9.	"Without You"	MacLennan	4:18
