= Go Figure (film) =

- Promotional poster
- Genre: Action; Sports; Comedy drama Romance; Teen drama
- Written by: Patrick J. Clifton; Beth Rigazio
- Directed by: Francine McDougall
- Starring: Jordan Hinson; Whitney Sloan; Cristine Rose; Ryan Malgarini; Tania Gunadi; Amy Halloran; Brittany Curran; Sabrina Speer; Jake Abel; Paul Kiernan; Kristi Yamaguchi
- Theme music composer: Kenneth Burgomaster
- Country of origin: United States
- Original language: English

Production
- Producers: Sheri Singer; Don Schain
- Cinematography: Gordon Lonsdale
- Editor: Terry Blythe
- Running time: 92 minutes
- Production company: Just Singer Entertainment
- Budget: $500,000

Original release
- Network: Disney Channel
- Release: June 10, 2005

Go Figure is a 2005 American sports comedy-drama film released as a Disney Channel Original Movie and starring Jordan Hinson. Walt Disney Records released the Go Figure soundtrack on June 7, featuring the title track by Everlife alongside a music video.

== Plot ==
Katelin Kingsford, a talented young teenage figure skater, dreams of being a champion. During one of her competitions, she is discovered by a famous Russian skating coach, Natasha Goberman. However, Natasha coaches at an expensive boarding school and Katelin's parents cannot afford to send her there. To help Katelin with the expenses, Natasha convinces the girls hockey team coach to give the last hockey scholarship to Katelin so she can train at the boarding school. Katelin is overjoyed and excited to be taught by Natasha but quickly finds balancing hockey practice, skate club practice, and her homework to be difficult. Spencer, a student assistant coach, constantly ridicules her, and her fellow skaters ostracize her. However, Katelin finds some consolation in her roommate, Amy 'Hollywood' Henderson, a fellow hockey player.

Katelin faces several obstacles and bullying in her new life, due to which Katelin loses a private training session with one of her idols, Kristi Yamaguchi, causing Natasha to feel great disappointment towards Katelin. After the hockey team's hostility and her failing grades, she returns home to find her stuff packed. Feeling unwanted, Katelin grabs a box of her ice skating things and runs out of the house. After talking with her mother, Katelin decides not to quit and returns to school.

Katelin's grades gradually improve, while she continues to train for hockey and figure skating alone, much to Spencer's admiration. Later in the season, Katelin helps her team win and progress to the finals. When Katelin realizes that the hockey finals fall on the same day as the Senior Nationals, an event that scouts for potential Olympic figure skaters, she decides to attend the hockey game, much to Spencer's disbelief. They lose the finals by one goal, though the team are pleased they made it to the final regardless.

Spencer gathers all of Katelin's figure skating equipment and takes her to the Senior Nationals, but her suitcase falls open in front of the hockey team, exposing her as a 'twirl girl'. While getting ready, Katelin realizes that one of her skates is missing, and Natasha gives her her hockey skates instead. At the beginning of her skating routine, Katelin falls before her hockey team arrives with her missing skate. After completing her routine, the judges announce that Katelin has made it into the US Olympic team.

== Cast ==
- Jordan Hinson as Katelin "Kat" Kingsford
- Whitney Sloan as Amy "Hollywood" Henderson
- Cristine Rose as Natasha Goberman
- Ryan Malgarini as Bradley Kingsford
- Tania Gunadi as Mary "Mojo" Johnson
- Amy Halloran as Ronnie
- Brittany Curran as Pamela
- Sabrina Speer as Shelby Singer
- Jake Abel as Spencer
- Paul Kiernan as Coach Reynolds
- Kristi Yamaguchi as Herself
- Jodi Russell as Linda Kingsford
- Curt Dousett as Ed Kingsford
- Morgan Lund as Bob
- Anne Sward as Ginger
- Kadee Leishman as Heather
- Austin Jepson as Hooner

== Soundtrack ==
Go Figure

Soundtrack album by Various artists
- Released: June 7, 2005
- Recorded: 2004–2005
- Genres: Pop, pop rock
- Length: 30:08
- Label: Walt Disney
- Producers: Matthew Gerrard, Adam Watts, Andy Dodd

Professional ratings
Review scores
Source	Rating
Allmusic	2/5 stars

The soundtrack was released on June 7, 2005 in the United States. It peaked at number 23 on the Billboard Top Kid Audio.

Track listing

1. Everlife - "Go Figure" – 4:08
2. Bowling for Soup - "Greatest Day" – 3:13
3. Caleigh Peters - "I Can Do Anything" – 3:42
4. Brie Larson - "She Said" – 3:44
5. Hope 7 - "I Want Everything" – 2:54
6. Superchic(k) - "Anthem" – 2:51
7. Raven-Symoné - "Life Is Beautiful" – 3:16
8. Cadence Grace - "Crash Goes My World" – 3:03
9. Junk - "Life Is Good" – 3:10

== Awards ==
Go Figure was nominated in the Young Artist Awards for Best Television Movie or Special.

== See also ==
- List of films about ice hockey
