= Sam Douglas =

American actor

- Born: Douglas Samuel Waters; 17 June 1957 (age 69); Banbury, England
- Occupation: Actor
- Years active: 1984–present

Sam Douglas (born Douglas Samuel Waters; 17 June 1957) is a British actor best known for his role as private detective Scott Shelby in the PlayStation 3 video game Heavy Rain, as King Herod in The Bible miniseries for the History Channel, and as Rosebud in the movie Snatch. He has had several other roles in films, television, commercials, and on stage.

== Education ==
He received a Bachelor of Fine Arts in acting from Simpson College, Iowa, and in directing from the Oklahoma City University School of Drama. At both places of study he was under the tutorship of Alan Langdon.

== Theatre ==
He has played in several theatres in US and UK such as the Royal National Theatre, Greenwich Theatre, Royal Court Theatre and Savoy Theatre. Some of the plays include: Edmond at the Royal Court Theatre, London; A Raisin in the Sun and Porgy and Bess at the Savoy Theatre; The Darker Face of the Earth and A Streetcar Named Desire at the Royal National Theatre in London; and On The Waterfront with Steven Berkoff. Sam Douglas is also a Theatre Director from the Actors Space in New York and runs professional method acting workshops in London and Oxford, based on the Stanislavski's system under Alan Langdon at the Circle in the Square Theatre in New York City.

== Filmography ==
=== Film ===
| Year | Title | Role | Notes |
|---|---|---|---|
| 1984 | The Razor's Edge | Man at Kissing Booth | |
| 1985 | Claudia | Ginsberg | |
| 1985 | Dreamchild | 4th Reporter | |
| 1985 | Death Wish 3 | Policeman | |
| 1986 | The American Way | Vietnam Vet | |
| 1987 | The Fourth Protocol | Russian Soldier | |
| 1988 | The Dressmaker | Cpl. Zawadski | |
| 1989 | Batman | Ricorso's Lawyer | |
| 1995 | Hackers | English Teacher | |
| 1996 | Mission: Impossible | Kiev Room Agent #3 | |
| 1997 | The Fifth Element | Chief NY Cop | |
| 1997 | Fight and Revenge | Captain Holcroft | |
| 1998 | The Snatching of Bookie Bob | Little Isador | |
| 1999 | Eyes Wide Shut | Cab Driver | |
| 2000 | Snatch | Rosebud | |
| 2003 | Al's Lads (Capone's Boys in US) | Fats | |
| 2003 | Octane | Detective | |
| 2004 | Method | Mr. Hinkley | |
| 2004 | Agent Cody Banks 2: Destination London | US President | |
| 2004 | Beyond the Sea | Jackie Gleason | |
| 2005 | Dot.Kill | Detective Ryker | |
| 2005 | Derailed | Homicide Detective | |
| 2006 | Final Contract: Death on Delivery | Strasser | |
| 2006 | Perfume: The Story of a Murderer | Grimal | |
| 2007 | The Tonto Woman | Bonnet | |
| 2007 | The Christmas Miracle of Jonathan Toomey | Wallis Woodman | |
| 2007 | How to Lose Friends & Alienate People | Barman | |
| 2008 | Franklyn | Soul | |
| 2011 | Colombiana | William Woodward | |
| 2011 | Cleanskin | Harry | |
| 2013 | The Sweeter Side of Life | Dino Ravettino | |
| 2015 | The Rezort | Big Guy | |
| 2016 | Sunset Park | The Sledge | |
| 2016 | Factory Farm | John | |
| 2017 | Valerian and the City of a Thousand Planets | American Tourist | |
| 2021 | Bansu | American Soldier | Russian film |
| 2022 | Texas Chainsaw Massacre | Herb | |

=== Television ===
| Year | Title | Role | Notes |
|---|---|---|---|
| 1992–1993 | Jeeves and Wooster | Captain Corrigan | 3 episodes |
| 1993 | Doctor Finlay | Sgt Steve Fullerton | 3 episodes |
| 1998 | Highlander | Baxter | 1 episode |
| 2000 | King of the Hill | Delivery Guy | 1 episode |
| 2002 | Lexx | General Klebstock | 1 episode |
| 2006 | If... | Fraser | 1 episode |
| 2010 | Money | Taxi Driver | 1 episode |
| 2013 | The Bible | King Herod | 1 episode |
| 2013 | Bad Education | Mitchell's Dad | 2 episodes |
| 2015 | Magnum Opus | US Ambassador Bullitt | 3 episodes |
| 2017 | Timewasters | Vadim | |
| 2020 | Killing Eve | American Golfer | 1 episode |

=== Video games ===
| Year | Game | Role |
|---|---|---|
| 2010 | Heavy Rain | Scott Shelby |
| 2022 | As Dusk Falls | Bear Holt |
