= A Princess for Christmas =

2011 television film directed by Michael Damian

- Written by: Janeen Damian; Michael Damian
- Directed by: Michael Damian
- Starring: Roger Moore; Katie McGrath; Sam Heughan; Charlotte Salt; Leilah de Meza; Travis Turner
- Theme music composer: Mark Thomas
- Country of origin: United States
- Original language: English

Production
- Producers: Janeen Damian; Michael Damian
- Cinematography: Viorel Sergovici
- Editor: Seth Flaum
- Running time: 1:30
- Production company: MediaPro Studios

Original release
- Network: Hallmark Channel
- Release: December 3, 2011

A Princess for Christmas, billed in the United Kingdom as A Christmas Princess: Sometimes Dreams Come True, previously known as the Canadian title Christmas at Castlebury Hall and A Princess for Castlebury, is a 2011 American television comedy drama film directed by Michael Damian and starring Roger Moore, Katie McGrath, Sam Heughan, Charlotte Salt, Leilah de Meza, and Travis Turner. The film premiered December 3, 2011 on Hallmark Channel.

== Plot ==
Jules Daly is an antique store worker in Buffalo, New York, who becomes the legal guardian of her niece, Maddie and her nephew, Milo after the loss of her sister and brother-in-law. Maddie is a fun-loving girl, and Milo is a rebel and troublemaking teenager. After Jules gets laid off by Arthur, due to financial problems and the children's babysitter Mrs. Kelly quits following Maddie's pranks, Jules reprimands Maddie for driving the nanny away and grounds Milo for sneaking out, shoplifting a game and decapitating Maddie's doll to keep her quiet. Milo also does not want to go get a Christmas tree with Jules, due to the fact that, Christmas reminds him of his parents' death.

Paisley Winterbottom, who is the butler of the children's wealthy grandfather, Duke Edward appears with an invitation for Milo and Maddie to spend the Christmas holidays, with his employer in the country of Castlebury. Jules initially refuses, but decides to go for the children's sake when Paisley claims that the Duke is ill.

Arriving at the palace where the Duke is in good health, Jules meets prince Ashton, the brother of her late sister's late husband Charles, and instantly falls in love with him. Looking around, she finds no Christmas trees and asks the Duke why there are none. He replies that he does not like them. But Jules takes Maddie out to get a tree and then they all decorate it. Edward finds out and becomes furious, until Maddie hands him an ornament, which turns out to be the same one that his brother had given him when they were children. Finally appreciating the spirit of the season, he tells Paisley to send invitations out for a Christmas Eve ball.

While teaching Milo archery, Ashton talks about his brother, Charles, and how the Duke disowned him for marrying Jules' sister, which had led to Jules' resentment towards the Duke. Maddie manages to warm her grandfather's heart enough to get him to change his opinion towards Christmas.

Overhearing Ashton and Edward speaking disapprovingly of someone "untitled" and "crass" they would prefer not to invite to the ball, but Jules mistakenly believes that it is about her, although they are actually talking about someone else.

When the staff accidentally burns Jules' dress, she takes this as an excuse not to attend. Jules, feeling unwelcome, decides to go back to the USA early, only telling the children. Despite their efforts to make her stay, she leaves, asking them not to tell anyone until she is gone. The housekeeper, Mrs. Birch, finds that Jules is missing. She and Paisley lead some members of the staff to retrieve her. They pick her up the train station while also having a dress brought in from Vienna.

Meanwhile at the ball, Ashton verifies his girlfriend, Lady Arabella, only wants him for his title. Jules arrives at the ball. When Ashton finds her, she says she is trying to not be an embarrassment. Confused, he asks for an explanation. After Jules explains her eavesdropping, Ashton clears things up, noting that the woman they called an "awful grizzly woman" was Bunny McCracken, who hates children. They then dance. Arabella and her parents unsuccessfully attempt to turn Edward and Ashton against Jules, then storm out. Ashton asks Jules to extend their stay and she agrees.

The family then "catches" Santa putting gifts under the Christmas tree. Sometime later, Jules and Ashton are married, and their friends and family watch as they ride off in a coach together.

== Cast ==
- Roger Moore as Edward, the Duke of Castlebury, Charles and Ashton's father, Milo and Maddie's paternal grandfather.
- Katie McGrath as Jules Daly, Milo and Maddie's maternal aunt and Ashton's wife.
- Sam Heughan as Ashton Huntington, the prince of Castlebury, Edward's son, Charles' brother, Milo and Maddie's paternal uncle and Jules' eventual husband.
- Charlotte Salt as Arabella Marchand du Belmont, Ashton's ex-girlfriend.
- Leilah de Meza as Maddie Huntington, Charles' daughter, Milo's sister, Ashton and Jules' niece.
- Travis Turner as Milo Huntington, Charles' son, Maddie's brother, Ashton and Jules' nephew.
- Miles Richardson as Paisley Winterbottom, Edward's butler.
- Maria Junghietu as Mrs. Kelly, Milo and Maddy's former babysitter.
- Oxana Moravic as Mrs. Birch, Edward's housekeeper.
- Madalina Anea as Abigail, a housemaid, who works for Edward.
- Florin Busuioc as Lord du Belmont, Arabella's father.
- Anca Varlan as Bunny McCracken, a grizzly woman who hates children.
- Michael Damian as Arthur, the owner of the antique store, who reluctantly fires Jules due to financial troubles.

== Production ==
In August 2008, writer and director Michael Damian told OK Magazine that he was "working on a screenplay called Christmas At Castlebury Hall". The film was shot at Peleş Castle, Stirbei Castle, the Bragadiru Palace and at MediaPro Studios in Bucharest, Romania February and March 2011. The film's cinematographer is Viorel Sergovici.
On July 16, Michael Damian announced the film's new name: A Princess for Christmas.

== Accolades ==
Movieguide Awards – A Princess for Christmas
Year	Nominee / work	Award	Result
2011	Most Inspirational Television Acting	Grace Award: Sam Heughan	Nominated
2011	Most Inspirational Television Acting	Grace Award: Katie McGrath	Nominated

== See also ==
- List of Christmas films
