= Powderly, Kentucky =

- City
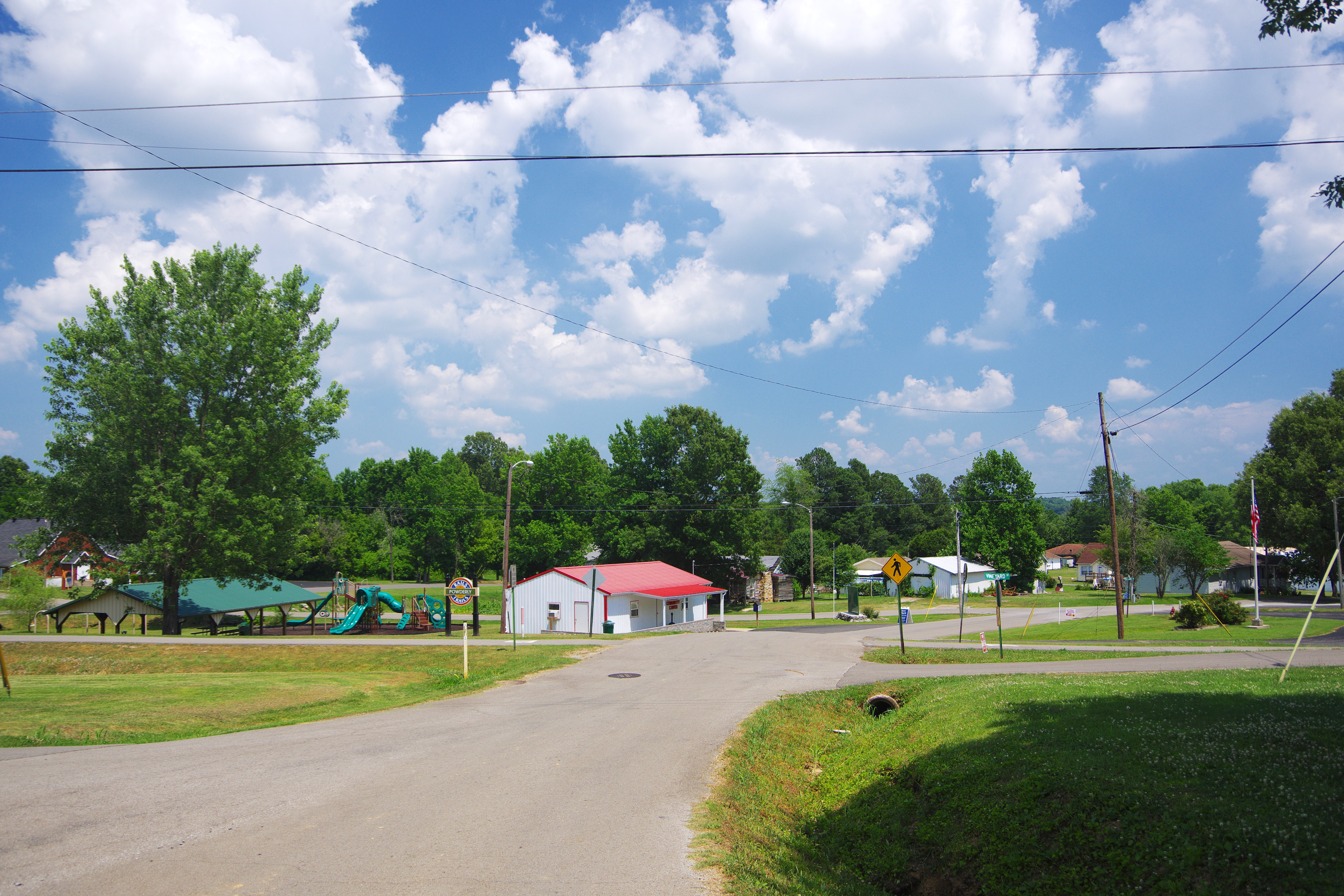
- Powderly

- Location in Muhlenberg County, Kentucky
- Coordinates: 37°14′25″N 87°9′25″W
- Country: United States
- State: Kentucky
- County: Muhlenberg
- Incorporated: 1963
- Named for: a labor organizer

Area
  - Total: 1.60 sq mi (4.15 km^{2})
  - Land: 1.56 sq mi (4.05 km^{2})
  - Water: 0.039 sq mi (0.10 km^{2})
- Elevation: 449 ft (137 m)

Population (2020)
  - Total: 788
  - Density: 504.2/sq mi (194.69/km^{2})
- Time zone: UTC-6 (Central (CST))
  - Summer (DST): UTC-5 (CDT)
- ZIP code: 42367
- Area code: 270
- FIPS code: 21-62652
- GNIS feature ID: 0501233

Powderly is a home rule-class city in Muhlenberg County, Kentucky, in the United States. The population was 788 as of the 2020 census.

== History ==
The city developed around a coal mine opened by the Cooperative Coal Company in 1887. The community was named for Terence Powderly, an early labor leader, when the post office was established the next year. William H. Smith served as the first postmaster. The town was incorporated in 1963.

== Geography ==
Powderly is located in central Muhlenberg County at 37°14′25″N 87°9′25″W (37.240274, -87.157042). The city is situated along U.S. Route 62 between Central City to the northeast and Greenville to the southwest. Kentucky Route 189 serves as a bypass route around Powderly.

According to the United States Census Bureau, the city has a total area of 1.60 square miles (4.1 km^{2}), of which 0.04 square miles (0.10 km^{2}), or 2.50%, are water. The city drains south to Caney Creek and north to Little Cypress Creek, both part of the Green River watershed.

== Demographics ==
Historical population
Census	Pop.	Note	%±
1970	631		—
1980	848		34.4%
1990	748		−11.8%
2000	846		13.1%
2010	745		−11.9%
2020	788		5.8%
U.S. Decennial Census

As of the census of 2000, there were 846 people, 342 households, and 235 families residing in the city. The population density was 586.7 inhabitants per square mile (226.5/km^{2}). There were 396 housing units at an average density of 274.6 per square mile (106.0/km^{2}). The racial makeup of the city was 96.10% White, 2.96% African American, 0.24% Native American, and 0.71% from two or more races. Hispanic or Latino of any race were 0.24% of the population.

There were 342 households, out of which 29.8% had children under the age of 18 living with them, 55.0% were married couples living together, 10.2% had a female householder with no husband present, and 31.0% were non-families. 26.0% of all households were made up of individuals, and 13.2% had someone living alone who was 65 years of age or older. The average household size was 2.47 and the average family size was 2.98.

In the city, the population was spread out, with 24.2% under the age of 18, 10.5% from 18 to 24, 27.5% from 25 to 44, 22.9% from 45 to 64, and 14.8% who were 65 years of age or older. The median age was 36 years. For every 100 females, there were 92.7 males. For every 100 females age 18 and over, there were 81.6 males.

The median income for a household in the city was $23,750, and the median income for a family was $28,063. Males had a median income of $29,250 versus $16,591 for females. The per capita income for the city was $11,705. About 10.3% of families and 15.6% of the population were below the poverty line, including 21.5% of those under age 18 and 18.6% of those age 65 or over.

== Sites of interest ==
=== Muhlenberg County Agriculture and Convention Center ===
The Convention Center is frequently the site of horse shows, rodeoes, tractor pulls, cattle auctions, and go-kart races. It is also the site for Muhlenberg County's annual Relay for Life event.

=== Paradise Park ===
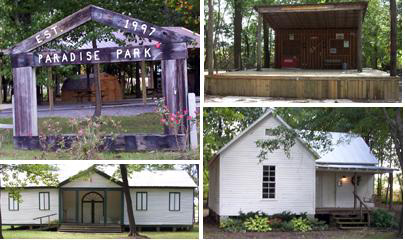
Paradise Park montage

Located near the Muhlenberg County Agriculture and Convention Center on the Highway 189 bypass, Paradise Park is the site of weekly "Pickin' in the Park" events during the months of June through September. Several historic buildings have been moved or constructed in Paradise Park, including:

- Coal Mines Shotgun House
- Merle Travis Birthplace - moved to Paradise Park and renovated
- Paradise Park Museum - a replica of a 1920s coal mining town
- Springridge School - a two-room schoolhouse built in 1935 and moved to the park

== Notable native ==
- James Best, American character actor best known as Sheriff Rosco P. Coltrane in The Dukes of Hazzard
