= Hot Tamale =

- Theatrical release poster
- Directed by: Michael Damian
- Written by: Janeen Damian; Michael Damian
- Produced by: Janeen Damian; Michael Damian
- Starring: Randy Spelling; Diora Baird; Jason Priestley; Carmen Electra; Mike Starr
- Cinematography: Frederick Iannone
- Edited by: Adam Heller
- Music by: Mark Thomas
- Production company: Riviera Films
- Distributed by: Motion Picture Corporation of America
- Release date: April 23, 2006
- Running time: 102 minutes
- Country: United States
- Language: English
- Budget: $500,000

Hot Tamale is a 2006 American comedy-drama film directed by Michael Damian, co-written by Janeen Damian. It stars Randy Spelling, Diora Baird and Carmen Electra. The film opened on April 23, 2006, and the DVD was released on August 29, 2006. The film is Michael Damian's feature film directorial debut.

== Plot ==
Harlan Woodruff (Randy Spelling) is a Salsa musician from Wyoming, on a road trip to Los Angeles to realise his dream of making it big as a percussionist. It is revealed that Harlan had a troubled childhood, having found his dead father frozen in a fishing hole. En route to Los Angeles, he runs into Jude (Jason Priestley), a career criminal on the run from two hit men, Al and Dwayne (Mike Starr and Sean Blakemore), who want to retrieve stolen merchandise from him. Desperate, Jude dumps the merchandise into Harlan's bag and escapes.

Harlan, meanwhile, stays over at his Puerto Rican friend Carlo's apartment. He meets Tuesday (Diora Baird), a friend of Carlos there. Carlos leaves town on an assignment and Tuesday and Harlan have the apartment to themselves. Harlan discovers that Carlo is a marijuana cultivator, growing the plants at his house. When trying to smoke the substance, he has a panic attack and lands in the hospital. After making a recovery, Tuesday brings him back to the apartment, where they sleep in. Meanwhile, Al and Dwayne catch up with Jude, who spills his guts that the bag the hit men are looking for is with Harlan. Jude's partner Riley (Carmen Electra) is also hot on Harlans trail.

The hitmen and Riley have their own demands and want the stolen merchandise, which turns out to be diamonds. A shoot out ensues and finally the hitmen are nabbed and Harlan walks away from the fire fight unharmed with Tuesday.

== Cast ==
- Randy Spelling as Harlan Woodriff, the naive salsa musician from Wyoming.
- Diora Baird as Tuesday Blackwell, the damsel in distress.
- Carmen Electra as Riley, a con woman and thief.
- Jason Priestley as Jude, Riley's partner in crime.
- Mike Starr as Al
- James Best as Hank Larson
- Richard Riehle as Sheriff Pinkham
- Sean Blakemore as Dewayne Longfellow
- Beth Grant as Dori Woodriff
- Christian Boewe as Young Harlan
- Matt Cedeño as Caesar Lopez
- Kristen Caldwell as Bitsy
- Sandy Martin as Ed the Diner Cook

== Reception ==
=== Critical response ===
The movie was mostly panned by critics, with a few exceptions. Positive takeaways were performances of Randy Spelling and the debut direction effort of Michael Damian.

== Awards ==
The film won the Boston International Film Festival Best Narrative feature Award for Michael Damian and Janeen Damian. It also won the Festival Prize at the Dixie Film Festival.
