= Whitney Sloan =

British actress (born 1988)

- Born: 21 August 1988 (age 37); London, England, UK
- Occupation: Actress
- Years active: 2003–present

Whitney Sloan (born 21 August 1988 in London) is a British actress known for the role of "Hollywood Henderson" in the Disney Channel Original Movie Go Figure.

She has appeared in stage productions of West Side Story, Fiddler on the Roof, and Romeo and Juliet. Television roles include Judging Amy, General Hospital, and the independent film State's Evidence. She appeared in the films Blue Demon and Glass Trap. Other projects include Joint Custody.

== Filmography ==
Film and television
Year	Title	Role	Notes
2003	Judging Amy	Kelly Mitchell	"Motion Sickness"
2003–04	General Hospital	Kate Salor	TV series
2004	Blue Demon	Mercedes	Video
2005	Joint Custody	Sara	TV film
2005	Glass Trap	Carly	
2005	Go Figure	Amy "Hollywood" Henderson	TV film
2006	State's Evidence	Kelly	
2007	Moondance Alexander	Megan Montgomery	
