= New Music Awards =

American music award

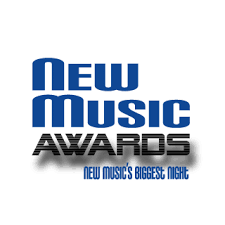
- Awarded for: honouring excellence in Music
- Country: United States
- Presented by: New Music Weekly
- First award: 2003
- Website: newmusicawards.com

The New Music Awards are honors given annually in music to both recording artists and radio stations by New Music Weekly magazine, a publication encompassing music charts within the music industry. The New Music Award show has been held annually since 2003.

== Categories ==
The New Music Awards honors artists/bands, radio programmers, radio stations and the "behind the scene" music industry folks which include radio promotion, publicity/PR, and record labels. The winners of New Music Awards are selected from the nominated lists of finalists by radio personnel, music industry executives, and industry panelists.

The New Music Awards are divided into five categories: Top 40/CHR, AC, Country, Crossover Artist/Band and PR Firm.
