= Moondance Alexander =

2007 film by Michael Damian

- Theatrical poster
- Directed by: Michael Damian
- Written by: Janeen Damian; Juan Saenz; Martha Lopez
- Produced by: Brad Krevoy
- Starring: Kay Panabaker; Don Johnson; Lori Loughlin
- Cinematography: Julien Eudes
- Edited by: Avril Beukes; Bridget Durnford
- Music by: Mark Thomas
- Production company: Motion Picture Corporation of America
- Distributed by: Fox Faith
- Release date: October 19, 2007
- Running time: 93 minutes
- Country: United States
- Language: English
- Box office: $37,895

Moondance Alexander is a 2007 American comedy-drama film directed by Michael Damian and written by Janeen Damian, Juan Saenz and Martha Lopez. Shot on location in Okotoks, High River and Calgary, Alberta, Canada the film is based on actual events from the life of Janeen Damian. It stars Kay Panabaker and Lori Loughlin, with Don Johnson and Sasha Cohen.

== Plot ==
Moondance (Kay Panabaker) is faced with the difficulties of her father's passing and her overprotective mother (Lori Loughlin). When she finds a lost pinto horse and discovers his jumping abilities, she convinces his owner Dante Longpre (Don Johnson) to train them to compete in a jumping show. There Moondance faces her enemy Fiona Hughes (Sasha Cohen) and her fancy horse Monte Carlo. When they do a surprisingly good job at the show, Dante isn't questioned anymore about his ability to train riders and horses. Everybody is shocked when Moondance ties Fiona, the reigning Bow River Classic champion.

== Cast ==
- Kay Panabaker as Moondance Alexander
- Don Johnson as Dante Longpre
- Lori Loughlin as Gelsey Alexander
- James Best as Mr. McClancy
- Sasha Cohen as Fiona Hughes
- Whitney Sloan as Megan Montgomery
- Joe Norman Shaw as Ben Wilson
- Aedan Tomney as Josh Wilson
- Mimi Gianopulos as Bella
- Landon Liboiron as Freddie

== Behind the scenes ==
Moondance Alexander was not well received by HorseChannel.com for storyline believability reasons. However, the story is closely based upon Janeen Damian's childhood experience of befriending a horse that she had found, receiving help from a trainer, and entering the horse in the Memphis Classic.

Moondance Alexander is a true family film, written by Janeen Damian and husband Michael Damian (born Michael Damian Weir), Damian, a Daytime Emmy Award winner, was also the producer of the film. Much of the music was written by Damian's brother, music producer and New Music Weekly editor, Larry Weir. Emmy Award winning Tom Weir was the mixing engineer at Studio City Sound.

Checkers the horse was played by three horses, a horse for tricks, a horse for jumping and a horse for Kay Panabaker to ride. Michael Damian recalled two of the horses names as Picasso and Trigger. The third horse's name is Spook.

Moondance Alexander received a U.S. General Audiences rating and was filmed in Alberta, Canada.

Year	Nominee / work	Award	Result
2007	Best Picture	Dixie Film Festival	Won
2007	Best Actress (Kay Panabaker)	Dixie Film Festival	Won

== Soundtrack ==
The Moondance Alexander Original Soundtrack was the second soundtrack released under the Caption Records label.

=== Featured vocalists ===
- Mimi Gianopulos
- Lea Herman
- Tessa Ludwick
- Buck McCoy
- Monét Monico
- Sara Niemietz
- Ian Walsh
- Laura Wight
- Heather Youmans

Moondance Alexander Original Soundtrack (by various artists)

- Released: 09 October 2007
- Format: LP/CD
- Label: Caption Records / Studio City Sound / INgrooves
- Writer: Larry Weir, Bernie Barlow, Dave Darling, Lea Herman, Ian Walsh
- Producer: Michael Damian, Larry Weir, Tom Weir, Bernie Barlow
- Singles: "I Choose You"

Track listing: Moondance Alexander (2007)
No.	Title	Writer(s)	Performer(s)	Length
1.	"I Choose You"	Bernie Barlow	Laura Wight	3:36
2.	"Call It A Day"	Larry Weir	Monét Monico	4:08
3.	"If I Could"	Michael Damian	Heather Youmans	4:26
4.	"It Only Gets Better"	Larry Weir	Mimi Gianopulos	3:47
5.	"Goodbye"	Ian Walsh	Ian Walsh	3:55
6.	"Coldest Day Of Summer"	Dave Darling	Laura Wight	3:35
7.	"Think For Each Other"	Milo Decruz, Lea Herman	Lea Herman	3:50
8.	"You Don't Know"	Larry Weir	Heather Youmans	4:12
9.	"It Only Takes One"	Larry Weir	Sara Niemietz	3:13
10.	"What Might Have Been"	Larry Weir	Buck McCoy	3:58
11.	"Better Kind Of Life"	Larry Weir	Tessa Ludwick / Laura Wight / Heather Youmans	3:34
12.	"If I Could"	Larry Weir	(Instrumental)	4:27

=== Musicians ===
- Bernie Barlow, Vocals
- Paul Bushnel, Bass
- Michael Chaves, Guitar
- Jorge Costa, Vocals (Background)
- Michael Damian, Percussion, Vocals (Background)
- Milo Decruz Bass, Guitar, Keyboards, Percussion, Producer
- Burleigh Drummond, Percussion
- Blake Ewing, Vocals (Background)
- Josh Freese, Drums
- Joshua Grange, Guitar
- Lea Herman, Keyboards, Vocals (Background)
- Matt Laug, Drums
- Lance Morrison, Bass
- Ginger Murphy, Cello
- Leah Nelson, Viola
- Michael Parnell, Keyboards
- Tim Pierce, Guitar
- Cam Tyler, Drums
- Ian Walsh, Bass, Guitar, Piano, Vocals (Background)
- Kevin Walsh, Guitar
- Larry Weir, Percussion, Vocals (Background)

=== Personnel ===
- Jorge Costa, Audio Engineer, Engineer
- James Gaynor, Audio Engineer
- Josh Mosser, Audio Engineer
- Luke Tozour, Audio Engineer, Engineer
- Tom Weir, Audio Engineer, Engineer

== See also ==
- List of films about horses
