= Glass Trap =

- Promotional poster
- Directed by: Fred Olen Ray (as Ed Raymond)
- Written by: Lisa Morton; Brett Thompson
- Produced by: Jeff Beach; Daniel Grodnik; Robert Snukal; Andrew Stevens
- Starring: C. Thomas Howell; Stella Stevens; Siri Baruc; Brent Huff; Chick Vennera; Andrew Prine; Martin Kove
- Cinematography: Andrea V. Rossotto
- Edited by: Randy Carter
- Music by: Christopher Farrell
- Distributed by: First Look International
- Release date: August 2, 2005
- Running time: 90 minutes
- Country: United States
- Language: English

Glass Trap is a 2005 American science fiction horror film starring C. Thomas Howell, Stella Stevens & Chick Vennera (in his final film) and directed by Fred Olen Ray, credited as Ed Raymond.

== Plot ==
An army of giant, radioactive ants are accidentally trapped in a skyscraper, and a group of employees must band together to escape the building.

== Cast ==
- C. Thomas Howell as Curtis
- Siri Baruc as Sharon
- Stella Stevens as Joan Highsmith
- Brent Huff as Dennis
- Andrew Prine as Sheriff Ed
- Chick Vennera as Paolo
- Martin Kove as Corrigan
- Tracy Brooks Swope as Elizabeth
- Peter Spellos as Howard Brunel
- Whitney Sloan as Carly
- John Clement as Jack Warner
- Ron Harper as Henry "Hank" Conlon

== Release ==
Glass Trap was released on DVD by First Look Pictures on August 2, 2005.

== Reception ==
David Cornelius from eFilmCritic gave the film 2/5 stars, writing, "Like many direct-to-video features, Glass Trap will do the trick for those who rent these kind of things. It's harmless in its dumbness, painless in its 'gee, get a load of these fake ants we whipped up' presentation. But it's not very entertaining, either." Chris Hartley from Video Graveyard gave the film 1.5 out of 4 stars, criticizing the film's dialogue, weak special effects, and poor attempts at humor. For TV Guide, the film is a "scary throwback to horror films of the '50s".

== See also ==
- List of killer insect films
