= Tessa Ludwick =

American actress (born 1988)

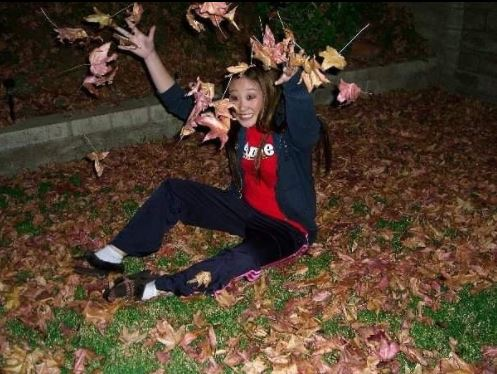
- Ludwick in a pile of fall leaves, 2009
- Born: October 5, 1988 (age 37); Seoul, South Korea
- Other names: Tess, Tessy
- Occupation: Actress
- Years active: 1994–2008
- Website: www.myspace.com/158277673

Tessa Ludwick (born October 5, 1988) is a South Korean-born American former actress from Apollo Beach, Florida. She began acting at the age of 5, when she appeared in Allegra's Window, a Nick Jr. children's television program show taped at Universal Studios in Orlando, Florida. When filming on Allegra's Window ended in May 1996, 7-year-old Ludwick went from Allegra's Window to a lead role in Big Bag, a live action/puppetry preschool television program on Cartoon Network. At the age of 8, she landed the role of Kate, an orphan girl in the touring Broadway musical Annie, the 20th Anniversary. For the next eight months, she toured the United States and Canada with the musical, during which time Ludwick gave eight performances per week.

In 2003, Ludwick appeared as the character Yumi in Thirteen, an autobiographical drama film based on American film actress/writer Nikki Reed's experiences as a 12 and 13-year-old girl. In 2004, Ludwick appeared on Movie Surfers, a Disney Channel short show where four teenagers go behind the scenes to report on Disney-related films. Three years later in June 2007, Ludwick began work on Teen Witch the Musical, a stage musical based on the 1989 fantasy-comedy film Teen Witch.

== Early career ==
Tessa Ludwick was born October 5, 1988, in Seoul, South Korea. She was adopted by American parents as an infant. Ludwick's career began at age two and a half when Ludwick saw a television commercial about modeling and begged her mother to call the number. Her modeling led to acting roles.

In the summer of 1994 at the age of 5, Ludwick spent time reading books but took time off to go to Six Flags Over Georgia, a 230-acre (0.93 km^{2}) theme park located west of Atlanta, in Austell. In September of that year, Ludwick attended 1st grade at Apollo Beach Elementary. While attending Apollo Beach Elementary, Ludwick held a minor role in Allegra's Window, a children's television program shown taped at Universal Studios in Orlando, Florida and shown on Nickelodeon's preschool block Nick Jr.

When filming on Allegra's Window ended in May 1996, 7-year-old Ludwick began a minor role in Big Bag, a live-action television puppet program for preschoolers that was produced by Children's Television Workshop and aired from 1996 to 1998 on Cartoon Network.

== Television, Broadway, and film ==
Ludwick was sent away in 1997 from Big Bag to play in the role of Kate in Annie, the 20th Anniversary, the Broadway musical on tour revival of the 1977 Broadway theatre production of Annie. The Annie, the 20th Anniversary tour ran across the United States and Canada from October 1997 through June 1998, during which time Ludwick gave eight performances per week. The Buffalo News noted that her November 1997 performance as the orphan girl Kate at Buffalo, New York's Shea's Performing Arts Center crafted a personality for the character whose "naturalness [far exceeded] that of the original Broadway cast." Characterized at that time as "bright, bubbly and [bringing] a sparkle wherever she goes," Ludwick additionally made the honor roll in Hillsborough County's program for gifted students in 1998. A year later, Ludwick became a spokesperson for Kids with a Cause, a youth organization based in California dedicated to improving the quality of life of children who suffer from poverty, lack of education, or health-related issues.

When she was 13, Ludwick played the character Yumi in Thirteen, a 2003 autobiographical drama film based on American film actress/writer Nikki Reed's experiences as a 12 and 13-year-old girl. About a year later, Ludwick appeared on Movie Surfers, a Disney Channel short show where four teenagers go behind the scenes to report on Disney-related films. After this successful career, she starred in Ned's Declassified School Survival Guide as Jennifer. Tessa has also appeared on a special "7th Graders" edition of the game show Weakest Link, where she made it to the final round and won $77,000 against Jill.
