= Gavin Report =

Radio-industry trade publication

- Editor: Various
- Categories: Radio industry/trade publication
- Frequency: Monthly
- Founder: Bill Gavin
- Founded: 1958
- Final issue: 2002
- Country: United States
- Based in: San Francisco
- Language: English
- OCLC: 34039542

The Gavin Report was a San Francisco-based radio industry trade publication. The publication was founded by radio performer Bill Gavin in 1958. Its Top 40 listings were used for many years by programmers to decide content of programs. The publication was also responsible for running the Gavin Seminar, a convention for radio industry members. In February 2002, United Business Media, who had owned the Gavin Report since 1992, decided to close the publication. Gavin executives cited a lack of cooperation on the part of media conglomerates (specifically naming Clear Channel Communications and Infinity Broadcasting), as well as poor convention attendance as reasons for the closure.
