= Radio industry =

Companies and providers broadcasting radio waves

The "radio industry" is a generic term for any companies or public service providers who are involved with the broadcast of radio stations or ancillary services.

Radio broadcasters can be broken into at least two different groups:

Public service broadcasters are funded in whole or in part through public money. This may be through money received directly from the government, or, as in the UK, through a license fee. The license fee is typically protected by law and set by the government, and is required for any household which contains equipment which can be used to receive a TV signal.

Commercial broadcasters (also called Independent Local Radio in the UK) are largely funded through the sales of advertising spots on their radio station. Commercial stations are often quite local, and may have some public service commitments within their permit.

== See also ==
- United States Federal Communications Commission
- Ofcom
- Television industry
- Radio advertisement
