= Travis Turner =

Canadian actor (born 1987 or 1988)

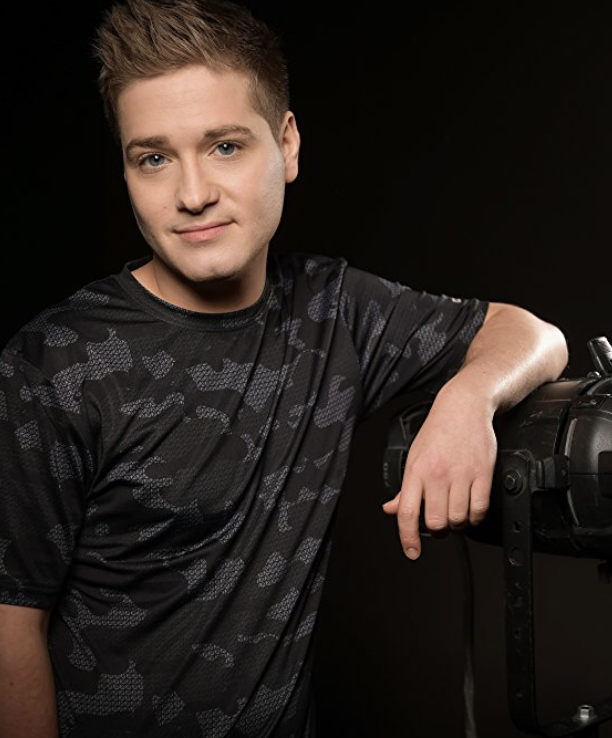
- Born: 1987 or 1988 (age 38–39); Oliver, British Columbia, Canada
- Occupations: Actor; rapper
- Years active: 1993–present

Travis Turner (born 1987 or 1988), also known as "Little T" or "T", is a Canadian actor and rapper.

== Early life ==
Born in Oliver, British Columbia and raised in Penticton, Turner finished high school in Alberta. He began his career at the age of six. He is currently a business owner and entrepreneur, alongside an entertainer, based in Vancouver, British Columbia.

== Career ==
Turner's first role was a recurring role in the science-fiction drama Caprica. Later he got a role in the film Confined, alongside Battlestar Galactica star Michael Hogan. In 2005, Turner was awarded the "Outstanding Male Performance in a Supporting Role" award at the Alberta One Act Festival.

Since moving to Vancouver, however, Turner has also appeared in short films, including Scars, Henchin and Snow Tramp, which were shown at multiple festivals, including the Tao New Mexico Mountain, New Zealand Mountain, Vancouver International MidForms, New Media Festival 2009, Made in Vancouver and the Hollywood North Showcase.

His first feature was in Easter Bunny Blood Bath, and he filmed a Mattel games commercial soon after. Turner also had a role in Teletoon's Tower Prep. He also had roles in the series Fairly Legal and Supernatural. His biggest role to date was when he starred in Marley & Me: The Puppy Years, the followup to the 2008 feature film Marley & Me.

He had a role in the TV movie A Princess for Christmas. He also landed a starring role in A Fairly Odd Christmas Nickelodeon's sequel to A Fairly Odd Movie: Grow Up, Timmy Turner!, alongside Drake Bell and Daniella Monet. Turner played the character Aster Vanderberg in the Netflix and YTV series Some Assembly Required. He also voices Lui Shirosagi in the anime Beyblade Burst.

In 2016, he voiced Tender Taps in the My Little Pony: Friendship Is Magic season six episode "On Your Marks".

He is the voice of Trip Hamston in the Littlest Pet Shop series, Littlest Pet Shop: A World of Our Own, which premiered in April 2018. He also provides the voices of Merak in the video game Azure Striker Gunvolt 3 and the Robot Master Ice Man in Mega Man: Fully Charged.

In recent years, he played Rocky on Disney's Pup Academy. In the English dubs of Tobot and Kaeloo, he is the voice of Swag and Game Rule respectively. He also guest-starred on Polly Pocket as Agustus Von Uberich.

In his latest live-action work Aliens Stole My Body, Turner plays the infamous Lackey. This is the sequel to Aliens Ate My Homework, which is based on the children's book series.

His most recent cameo was in Some of Our Stallions, which was produced by Mike Judge and directed by Carson Mell.

In 2025, he appeared in Final Destination Bloodlines as an elevator operator.
