= Teen Witch =

1989 film by Dorian Walker

- Home video cover, also used for a theatrical release poster
- Directed by: Dorian Walker
- Written by: Robin Menken; Vernon Zimmerman
- Produced by: Alana Lambros; Rafael Eisenman
- Starring: Robyn Lively; Zelda Rubinstein; Dan Gauthier; Joshua Miller; Dick Sargent
- Cinematography: Marc Reshvosky
- Edited by: Natan Zahavi
- Music by: Larry Weir; Richard Elliot
- Production company: Trans World Entertainment
- Distributed by: Trans World Entertainment
- Release date: April 23, 1989
- Running time: 94 minutes
- Country: United States
- Language: English
- Budget: $2.5 million
- Box office: $27,843

Teen Witch is a 1989 American teen fantasy comedy film directed by Dorian Walker, written by Robin Menken and Vernon Zimmerman, and starring Robyn Lively and Zelda Rubinstein. The plot follows Louise, a teenage girl who discovers she is a witch and gains powers on her 16th birthday.

Originally pitched as a female version of Teen Wolf (1985), it was later reworked into a standalone spin-off film of its own. The film features numerous impromptu musical numbers, including rap sequences, and has since become a cult classic, aided by midnight theater showings and regular cable television airings (including through annual showings as part of ABC Family/Freeform's 13 Nights of Halloween). The film is also popular for its music and 1980s fashion nostalgia.

== Plot ==
Fifteen-year-old Louise Miller longs to be popular and catch the eye of high school quarterback Brad Powell. However, Brad dates cheerleader Randa, and Louise is seen as an uncool underclassman with a similarly unpopular best friend, Polly. During English class, Louise is mocked by her mean-spirited teacher, Mr. Weaver, who makes fun of a page from her diary that got accidentally stuck to her assignment. That night, after an unsuccessful audition for a part in a school play, Louise is bicycling home. Brad is driving, but gets distracted by his passenger, Randa, causing him to inadvertently run Louise off the road with his convertible.

In search of a phone to use, Louise enters the home of Madame Serena, a seer. Serena convinces Louise to do a palm reading, and tells her she is a witch who will develop powers on her sixteenth birthday. On Louise's birthday the following week, no one shows up to her party. Polly informs Louise that most of their peers went to another party thrown by Randa. That night, Louise tosses and turns in her bed as she recalls Serena's prophecy that she will soon gain powers. At school the next day, Louise's theater teacher, Ms. Malloy, gives her a necklace with an amulet that she finds among the costumes, and tells Louise she believes the amulet will bring her luck.

Immediately, Louise feels different and begins to wear the amulet regularly. Soon afterward, Randa invites Louise to attend a school dance with her cousin, David. Louise feels stuck with David, an insufferable, handsy nerd, but she manifests Brad coming coming over to talk to her and makes David disappear at her command. When she comes home, she accidentally turns her younger brother, Richie, into a dog when he mocks her, but she manages to change him back to his human self by throwing him into a bath. Louise later learns from Serena that she is the reincarnation of Modesty Miller, a witch born in 1636, and that the amulet she wears belonged to Modesty.

Serena gives Louise a book of magic spells to study and she learns to harness her powers by calling the wind and rain. She casts a love spell to make Brad fall for her. Louise then exacts revenge on Mr. Weaver by undressing a voodoo doll made in Weaver's image, embarrassing him in front of the whole class. She also uses her powers to help Ms. Malloy find true love and wealth, and to help Polly gain the courage to challenge fellow student Rhet in an informal rap battle. Louise asks for Serena's help to make her the most popular girl in school, and shows her a picture of her favorite pop star, Shana, for inspiration. Serena makes a potion, but, to complete the spell, explains she needs an item belonging to the singer. Louise uses her powers to go backstage during Shana's concert, where Shana, under a spell, gives Louise her jacket.

Thereafter, everyone at school worships and emulates Louise, and Brad takes immediate notice. After school, Brad takes Louise to an abandoned house, where he gives her the kiss she has long hoped for. However, Louise starts to wonder if Brad truly likes her or if he is only attracted to the popularity her powers summon. At school, Louise continues to ascend the social ladder, alienating Polly. She also accidentally wishes herself into the lead role of the school play by telling the original lead to break a leg, which she does. Later, Brad asks Louise to the dance, but Louise, feeling guilt-ridden from injuring a classmate and using magic to gain popularity, declines his invitation. Louise attempts to look for a way to reverse all the spells, but Serena explains that the real key to magic is believing in oneself. Serena accompanies Louise to the dance, where Louise gives the amulet to Serena and commits to being her true self. Upon seeing Louise, Brad crosses the dance floor to be with her. He and Louise dance together and kiss, with Brad showing he really likes Louise for who she is and not because of her magic.

== Cast ==
- Robyn Lively as Louise Miller
- Zelda Rubinstein as Madame Serena Alcott
- Dan Gauthier as Brad Powell
- Joshua Miller as Richie Miller
- Dick Sargent as Frank Miller
- Marcia Wallace as Ms. Edith Malloy
- Caren Kaye as Margaret Miller
- Shelley Berman as Mr. Weaver
- Mandy Ingber as Polly "Hats" Goldenberg-Cohen
- Noah Blake as Rhet Capiletti
- Lisa Fuller as Randa
- Tina Marie Caspary as Shawn
- Megan A. Gallivan as Kiki
- Jared Chandler as David
- Cindy Valentine as Shana

== Production ==
The idea for the film was initially conceived as a gender-flipped version of Teen Wolf, but during development was reworked into a standalone film. The script for the film was written by Robin Menken and Vernon Zimmerman. The first draft was raunchier and more in the style of a teen sex comedy like Porky's, but producer Alana H. Lambros and director Dorian Walker excised the racy elements to make the PG-13 film they desired. Walker and Lambros also wanted musical sequences to be added into the script. Lambros had connections in the music industry and met with Larry Weir, the songwriter for The Weir Brothers. Weir composed the song "Popular Girl" shortly after their meeting and agreed to pen the remainder of the songs. Walker brought on Robert Banas, a dancer in West Side Story, to choreograph the dance scenes.

Debbie Gibson was the original choice for the role of Louise, but negotiations with the singer fell through before she could be cast.

Principal photography began on November 25, 1988. The film was shot in the Los Angeles area. High school scenes were filmed at Herbert Hoover High School in Glendale over the school's winter break, with real students being used as extras.

During post-production, an early cut of the film was screened at the American Film Market to gauge the interest of foreign buyers. Reception was enthusiastic, and Moshe Diamante, the co-owner of the film's distributor Trans World Entertainment, mandated that more scenes be added to increase the film's production value. According to Lambros, Diamante said, "'We need to make this picture bigger! We have to put in more music and more scenes!'" Producer Rafael Eisenman was brought in to oversee the added filming. The added scenes included the "Top That!" rap battle sequence and the love scene at the abandoned house.

== Reception ==
=== Box office ===
Teen Witch was released in the United States on April 23, 1989, and grossed $3,875 in its opening weekend at the box office, and only $27,843 in its entire run against its production budget of $2.5 million. April 1989 box office competition included Field of Dreams starring Kevin Costner and Pet Sematary written by Stephen King. Both films were released on April 21, 1989, two days before Teen Witch was released.

=== Critical response ===
Upon release, the film was panned by critics, including Chris Willman of the Los Angeles Times, who called it "complete with teen wish-fulfillment fantasies, condescending moralizing, asinine musical montages, horrifying pop songs, French kissing, blatant product plugs and Dick Sargent (formerly of Bewitched)." TV Guide pointed out the predictability of the film and concluded, "Notwithstanding its supernatural elements, the film is basically a standard teenage love story (a squeaky clean one, at that) with several unmemorable musical numbers thrown in." Variety wrote "the comedy potential...is limited in this well-intentioned, young teen vehicle burdened by a nice message and a predictable outcome", but said where the film stands out is "its bouncy score, provided by Larry and Tom Weir".

On the review aggregator website Rotten Tomatoes, 43% of 21 critics' reviews are positive, with an average rating of 4.9/10. The website's consensus reads: "While drenched in upbeat messages and heart, the wonders of high school, love, and magic often don't meld well enough for this inoffensive Teen Witch."

=== Cult status ===
The film performed much better on home video and overseas. It gradually became a cult classic, having gained newer, younger audiences after regular airings on premium and basic cable networks such as HBO, Cinemax, and Disney Channel in the 1990s. Jarett Wieselman of the New York Post stated, "There are good movies, there are bad movies, there are movies that are so bad they're good and then there is Teen Witch – a cult classic that defies classification thanks to a curious combination of songs, spells and skin." Joshua John Miller, commenting on his involvement with the film as the character Richie, said, "If you look at Teen Witch, it was a very campy performance. But it's a really fun film and something I have grown to honor." The film has been celebrated in midnight movie screenings. The hosts of the film podcast How Did This Get Made? are avowed fans of the film, praising the strange musical numbers and Miller's performance as Richie in particular.

There are parodies or homages of the film, especially of its rap song "Top That" (including an homage starring Alia Shawkat). Drew Grant of Nerve.com stated, "If you've never seen the original rap scene from the 80s classic Teen Witch, you must immediately stop what you're doing and watch it right now. It's everything wonderful and terrible about that decade rolled into one misguided appropriation of... hip-hop." Stephanie Marcus of The Huffington Post called "Top That" "the worst song of all time."

In a 1998 retrospective review, Ada Calhoun of The Austin Chronicle praised the film, calling it "so Eighties it hurts". She added, "Between the dearth of character actors, the valuable lessons learned, and the textbook backfiring of good intentions, some may scoff. They would, however, be in the wrong, for this is a masterpiece of both the teen and witch genres. Louise the nerd, bubbling over with sexual energy and social ambition, becomes cool. Louise the witch, erratically powerful, learns how to rightly use her strength. Teen Witch is an all-around delicious flick, both despite and because of the afterschool special quality of its message." In an article for The A.V. Club, Marah Eakin discussed how the film is "a fun escape".

In 2007, ABC Family (now Freeform) acquired the basic cable television rights to the film, and has since made it a regular offering of its annual 13 Nights of Halloween holiday block.

== Soundtrack ==
A soundtrack album for Teen Witch was never released because financial backers of the film had neglected to provide funding for one. Because of the limited funding, many of the tracks were sung by members of the Weir family. By the early 2000s, the master audio tapes had become unavailable. In 2006, The Weir Brothers collaborated with Teen Witch producer Alana H. Lambros for Teen Witch the Musical, which used new cast members to sing the songs. An audio CD of the re-recorded songs was released in 2007.

The songs heard in the film are as follows:

1. "All Washed Up" – Larry Weir
2. "Dream Lover" – Cathy Car
3. "Finest Hour" – Cindy Valentine featuring Larry Weir
4. "High School Blues" – The Puppy Boys
5. "I Keep on Falling" – Blue Future
6. "I Like Boys" – Elizabeth and The Weirz
7. "Get Up and Move" – Cathy Car
8. "Much too Much" – Cathy Car
9. "Never Gonna Be the Same Again" (opening sequence) – Lori Ruso
10. "Never Gonna Be the Same Again" (concert version) – Cindy Valentine
11. "Popular Girl" – Theresa and The Weirz
12. "Rap" – Philip McKean and Larry Weir
13. "Shame" – The Weirz
14. "Top That" – The Michael Terry Rappers
15. "In Your Arms" – Richard Elliot

== Accolades ==
Award	Category	Name	Result	Ref.
Young Artist Awards	Best Young Actor Starring in a Motion Picture	Joshua John Miller	Nominated	
Young Artist Awards	Best Young Actress Starring in a Motion Picture	Robyn Lively	Nominated	

== Home media ==
On July 12, 2005, MGM released the film to DVD in its original widescreen theatrical version with no special features. On March 21, 2017, Kino Lorber released a Blu-ray edition. The edition included an audio commentary track and new interviews with Robyn Lively, Mandy Ingber, Dan Gauthier, and Joshua John Miller.

== Adaptations ==
Producer Alana H. Lambros envisioned a Broadway musical adaptation, and three different versions of the production were considered: a Teen Witch the Musical concert with just the music, a theme park version for Universal Studios, and a two-act musical with Broadway aspirations. Teen Witch the Musical was presented in workshop in 2006. In 2007, the audio CD for Teen Witch the Musical was released.

The cast of Teen Witch the Musical:

- Alycia Adler as Randa (Cheerleader)
- Bryce Blue as Rhet
- Blake McIver Ewing as Brad Powell
- Ashley Crowe as Madame Serena
- Monet Lerner as Darcy (Cheerleader)
- Tessa Ludwick as Phoebe (Cheerleader)
- Lauren Patten as Polly
- Sara Niemietz as Louise Miller
- Heather Youmans as Shana the Rock Star
- V-Style as rapper

In April 2008, Variety reported that Ashley Tisdale signed with FremantleMedia North America and was in talks with United Artists to star in a remake of Teen Witch, but no further developments transpired.

In 2013 and 2017, live versions of Teen Witch: The Musical were staged by Los Angeles improv group The Groundlings.

== See also ==
- List of films about witchcraft
