= Bill Gavin =

Bill Gavin (November 6, 1907 – January 27, 1985) was an American radio personality and publisher of the influential Gavin Report.

== Life and education ==
Gavin was born in Chetek, Wisconsin in 1907. He attended the University of Wisconsin-Eau Claire and the University of California-Berkeley. Before his radio career, he was a teacher, pianist and singer. He briefly traveled with an all-male vocal group called The Blenders. He died of cancer in 1985 at the age of 77.

== Career ==
He created the Lucky Lager Dance Time radio show in 1955 with the McCann-Erickson advertising agency. Gavin founded the Gavin Report in 1958 with information from the show. It was a publication that "monitored air play for Top 40 records, and later expanded to other categories; it [was] used as a programming aid by radio stations and record companies." The publication gathered information from various radio stations and was used to measure song popularity. Gavin was called the "most powerful man in the business." It was also said that "every record company subscribed to and quoted the Gavin Report...Everybody copied him, but he originated the thing." In 1983, after being diagnosed with cancer, he sold the Gavin Report to the staff and became publisher emeritus.

Gavin is also noted for his progressive stance in regards to race relations. He worked to help African-Americans break into the radio business by playing black artists and hiring black Disc-Jockeys at a time when it was unpopular to do so.
