= Flicka 2 =

- Official DVD cover
- Directed by: Michael Damian
- Written by: Jennifer Robinson
- Based on: Characters by Mary O'Hara
- Produced by: Connie Dolphin
- Starring: Patrick Warburton; Tammin Sursok; Clint Black; Emily Tennant; Reilly Dolman; Ted Whittall
- Cinematography: Ron Stannett
- Edited by: Michael Trent
- Music by: Mark Thomas
- Distributed by: 20th Century Fox Home Entertainment
- Release date: May 4, 2010
- Running time: 96 minutes
- Country: United States
- Language: English

Flicka 2 is a 2010 American drama film and a sequel to Flicka (2006). The film is about a city girl who is sent to the country and befriends a horse. Neither girl or horse are wanted and they find a common bond. The film stars Patrick Warburton, Tammin Sursok and Clint Black.

== Plot ==
After the death of her mother, Carrie McLaughlin (Tammin Sursok), a city girl, has been living with her grandmother in Pittsburgh, Pennsylvania. When her grandmother needs to go to a nursing home, Carrie has to move in with her estranged father, Hank (Patrick Warburton), a rancher in Wyoming.

Initially reluctant to adapt to country living, Carrie meets Flicka, a black Mustang that previously belonged to Carrie's cousin Katy (Alison Lohman), who asked Hank to look after Flicka when her father sold their ranch. Flicka is wild and dangerous and, according to the ranchers, longs for Katy. When Carrie is attacked by a prairie rattlesnake, Flicka saves her and the two bond.

Carrie meets Jake (Reilly Dolman), an attractive ranch hand hoping to become a country singer, and Amy Walker (Emily Tennant), the proud and arrogant daughter of a neighbor. Although Jake and Carrie take a liking to each other, there is instant animosity between Carrie and Amy, mainly because Amy also likes Jake.

When Carrie accidentally disobeys her father's rules regarding visits to the nearest town, Hank punishes Carrie by temporarily relocating Flicka to the farm of one of his ranch hands: Toby (Clint Black). After a midnight visit by Carrie, Flicka tries to run away to Toby's ranch, but ends up on the ranch belonging to Amy's father HD Walker (Ted Whittall). Upon entering the Walker ranch, Flicka destroys a fence and releases some prize cows. At Amy's request, HD asks for Flicka as payment for the damage, threatening to turn it into a lawsuit if Hank refuses. Amy starts training with Flicka for a championship, but performs poorly during the competition because of Flicka's fear of the crowd and camera flashes from the audience. HD and Amy decide to have Flicka killed the next day, but Carrie frees the horse during the night and sets her free to join a nearby herd of mustangs.

One year later, Carrie, Hank, and Toby are riding in the mountains when they encounter the same herd of mustangs, including Flicka and her newborn foal.

== Cast ==
- Patrick Warburton as Hank McLaughlin
- Tammin Sursok as Carrie McLaughlin
- Clint Black as Toby
- Emily Tennant as Amy Walker
- Reilly Dolman as Jake
- Ted Whittall as HD Walker
- Craig Stanghetta as Pete
- Dwayne Wiley as Tucker

== Soundtrack ==
Flicka 2 Original Motion Picture Soundtrack
No.	Title	Performer	Length
1.	"A Beautiful Day"	Clint Black	3:42
2.	"Not Your Girl Next Door"	Heather Youmans	3:17
3.	"Never Forget You"	Michael Damian	3:49
4.	"Save Yourself"	Jory	3:35
5.	"No Slowin' Me Down"	Trevor Alan Gilliland	3:34
6.	"Just A Little Something For You"	The Molnars	3:53
7.	"I'm So Over You"	Heather Youmans	3:08
8.	"Worth It To Me"	Trevor Alan Gilliland	4:12
9.	"Making Sound"	Cindy Santini	5:20
10.	"Still Mad About You"	Michael Damian	4:03
11.	"18 Years"	Buck McCoy	3:49
12.	"It's You Baby"	Heather Youmans	3:53
13.	"Man Of The Law"	Buck McCoy	3:05

- Musical score by: Thomas, Mark. "Flicka 2 [Original Motion Picture Score]".

== See also ==
- List of films about horses
