= New Music Weekly =

Trade magazine for the US radio and music industries

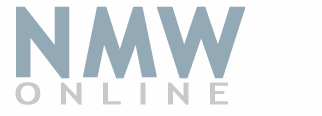
- Editors/Publishers: Larry Weir, Paul Loggins
- Editor: Chuck Daupin
- Categories: Music/Radio Industry
- Frequency: Weekly
- Publisher: Backstage Entertainment
- Founder: Paul Loggins, Larry Weir
- Founded: 1997
- Country: United States
- Based in: Los Angeles
- Language: English
- Website: newmusicweekly.com

New Music Weekly is a nationally distributed trade magazine for the US radio and music industries. Following the tradition of Bill Gavin and the Gavin Report, New Music Weekly interprets data from the Spins Tracking System. Weekly editorial features include highlights of the top singles impacting radio and "spotlights" of new music from the Top40/Pop, Country, AC/Hot, and College music genres.

The New Music Weekly editorial staff is composed of composer and producer Larry Weir, Billboard magazine, NMW publisher and veteran radio promoter Paul Loggins who also holds the position as Executive Producer of NMW's New Music Awards, and contributing writer Chuck Dauphin.

== New Music Awards ==
The New Music Awards are hosted annually by New Music Weekly, acknowledging the accomplishments of new artists and musicians, radio stations and programmers, music directors, and industry executives in the main music genres.
