= Michael Damian =

American actor and singer (born 1962)

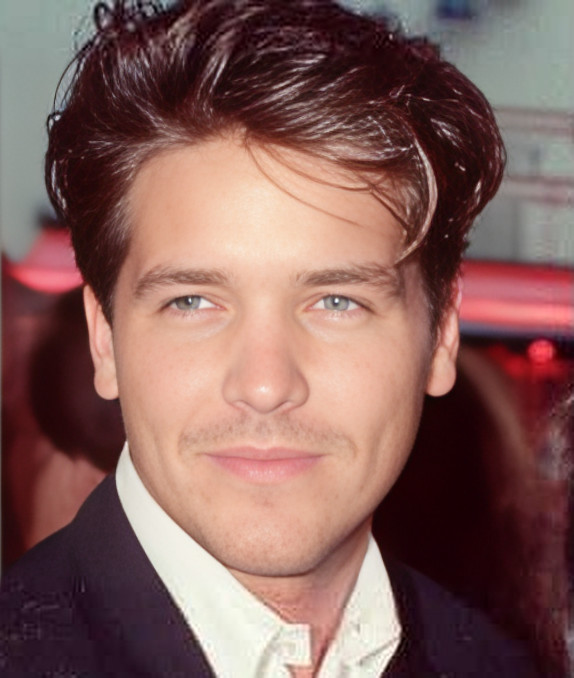
- At the 1990 premiere of Air America
- Born: Michael Damian Weir; April 26, 1962 (age 64); Bonsall, California, U.S.
- Occupations: Actor, recording artist and producer
- Years active: 1980–present
- Spouse: Janeen Damian (m. 1998)

Michael Damian Weir (born April 26, 1962), known professionally as Michael Damien, is an American actor, singer, director, writer, and producer. He best known for his role as Danny Romalotti on the soap opera The Young and the Restless, which he played in five stints between 1981 and 2026. Damien also had a hit music single in 1989 with a version of "Rock On".

== Career ==
His brother is musician Larry Weir. Damian began his music career as a member of his family band, The Weirz, who released two self-titled albums, one in 1975 and one in 1979. After a 1981 appearance on American Bandstand in support of his debut single, a cover of the Eric Carmen tune "She Did It”, Damian was offered the part of struggling singer, Danny Romalotti, on the daytime television series The Young and the Restless.

Damian appeared in three episodes of the popular television series The Facts of Life (in 1985 - Season 6 episodes 19–20 as well as 1986 in the nineteenth episode of Season 7) playing Flyman, the love interest of Jo Polniaczek (Nancy McKeon).

Damian performed the theme song to Saved by the Bell.

After twelve years with The Young and the Restless, Damian landed the starring role in the Broadway production of Andrew Lloyd Webber and Tim Rice's musical, Joseph and the Amazing Technicolor Dreamcoat. With Damian cast as Joseph, the production set a single day box-office record as well as a historical record for the highest weekly gross for a Broadway revival at the Minskoff Theatre. Joseph and the Amazing Technicolor Dreamcoat had 231 performances at the Minskoff Theatre from November 10, 1993, to May 29, 1994. The cast album earned a Grammy Award nomination in the Best Musical Show Album category.

Damian has released five albums with three top 40 hits, including his number-one cover of the David Essex song "Rock On" (from the Dream a Little Dream soundtrack), which was certified gold in 1989. He also won a BMI Song-writing Award for his hit single "Was It Nothing at All.” He made his feature film directorial debut with an indie comedy, Hot Tamale, which he co-wrote with his wife Janeen, who is the daughter of actor James Best. Following in the family film genre, he directed the films Moondance Alexander, Flicka 2, Marley & Me: The Puppy Years, Flicka: Country Pride, and A Princess for Christmas. In 2012, he directed and co-wrote, again with his wife, the 90-minute romantic comedy The Sweeter Side of Life, co-starring his father-in-law veteran actor James Best in his last film role. The film premiered on the Hallmark Channel on January 19, 2013.

== Discography ==
=== Studio albums ===
List of studio albums
Year	Title	Label	Hot 200
1984	Love Is a Mystery	Columbia	—
1986	Michael Damian	CBS	—
1989	Where Do We Go from Here	Cypress	61
1989	Dream a Little Dream (Soundtrack)	Cypress	94
1991	Dreams of Summer	A&M	—
1993	Reach Out to Me	Scotti Bros.	—
1994	Time of the Season	Wildcat Records (UNI); Wild Cat (Indie)	—
2003	Shadows in the Night	Bcd	—
2005	The Christmas Album	Studio City Sound	—
2007	Getting So Much Better	Caption Records	—
2009	Rock On	Caption Records; Weir Brothers Entertainment	—

=== Singles ===
List of singles, with selected peak chart positions
Year	Title	Peak chart positions							Album
Year	Title	US Hot 100	US Cash Box	US AC	US Dance Sales	AUS	GER	NZ	Album
1981	"She Did It"	69	95	—	—	—	—	—	single only
1984	"She's in a Different World"	—	—	—	—	—	—	—	Love Is a Mystery
1986	"What Are You Looking For"	—	—	—	—	—	—	—	Michael Damian
1987	"Christmas Time Without You"	—	—	—	—	—	—	—	single only
1989	"Rock On"	1	1	—	—	55	45	18	Where Do We Go from Here
1989	"Cover of Love"	31	30	—	—	—	—	—	Where Do We Go from Here
1989	"Was It Nothing at All"	24	23	7	—	—	—	—	Where Do We Go from Here
1990	"Straight from My Heart"	—	—	47	—	—	—	—	Where Do We Go from Here
1991	"What a Price to Pay"	60	57	—	—	—	—	—	Dreams of Summer
1991	"Let's Get Into This (Primal Solution)"	—	—	—	—	—	—	—	Dreams of Summer
1992	"(There'll Never Be) Another You"	—	—	26	—	—	—	—	Dreams of Summer
1993	"Reach Out to Me"	—	—	—	—	—	—	—	Reach Out to Me
1994	"Time of the Season"	—	—	—	—	—	—	—	Time of the Season
1994	"Never Walk Away"	—	—	—	—	—	—	—	Time of the Season
2002	"Shadows in the Night"	—	—	—	5	—	—	—	Shadows in the Night
2009	"Rock On (2009)"	—	—	28	—	—	—	—	Rock On
2023	"Bring Back the Christmas Card" (featuring Sharon Hendrix)	—	—	27	—	—	—	—	Christmas Album (deluxe)

== Theatre ==
- 1971–1973: Ventura County Youth Experimental Theatre
- 1993–1994: Joseph and the Amazing Technicolor Dreamcoat as Joseph
