= James Best =

American actor, musician, artist (1926–2015)

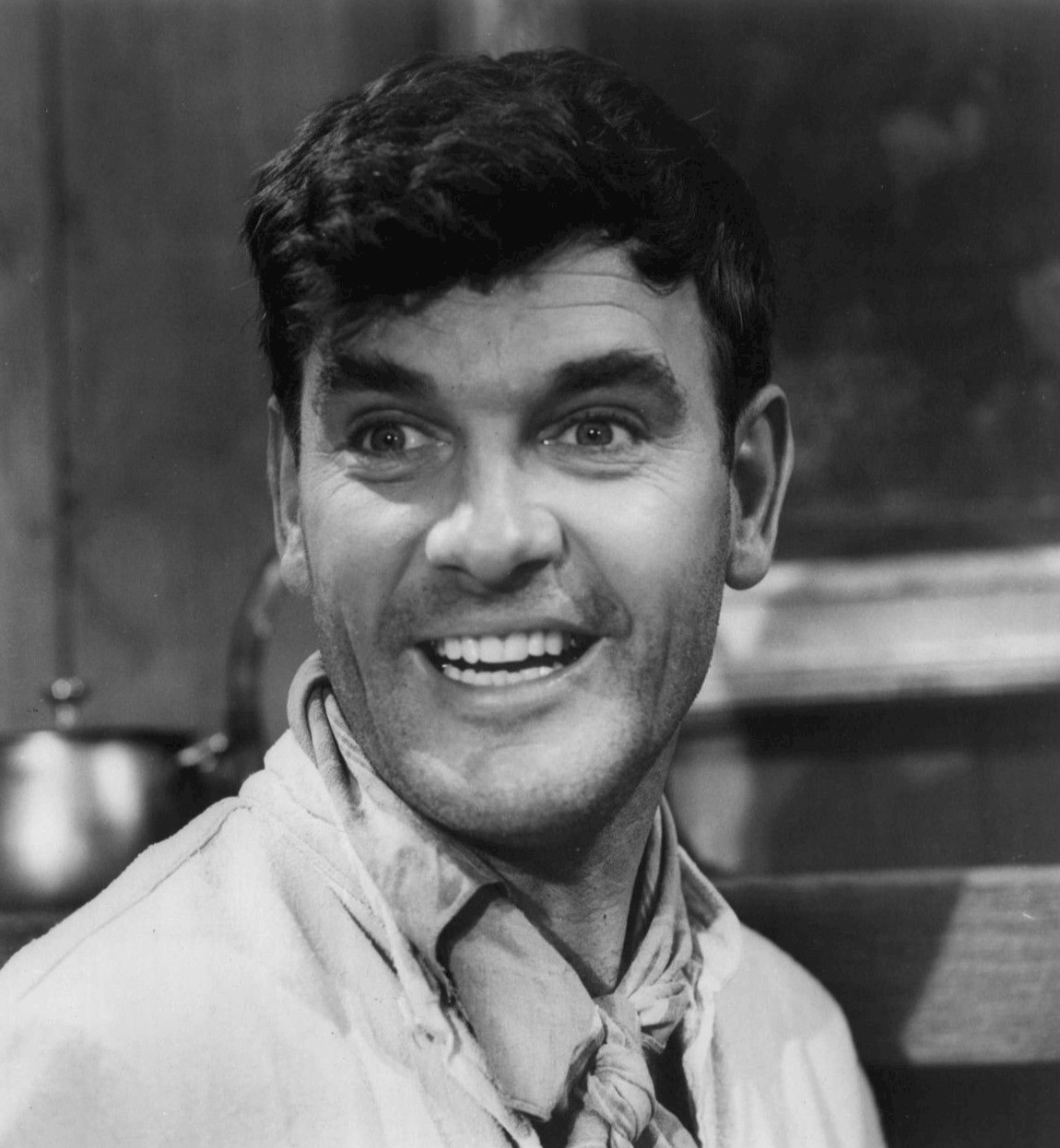
- Best in 1964
- Born: Jewel Franklin Guy; July 26, 1926; Greenville, Kentucky, US
- Died: April 6, 2015 (aged 88); Hickory, North Carolina, US
- Occupations: Actor; artist; acting coach; college professor; singer-songwriter
- Years active: 1949-2013
- Television: The Dukes of Hazzard
- Spouses: Matilda Engleberg (m. 1949; div. 19??); JoBee Croskery (m. 1959; div. 1977); Dorothy Collier (m. 1986)
- Children: 3
- Relatives: Don Everly (cousin); Phil Everly (cousin); Michael Damian (son-in-law)

Jewel Franklin Guy (July 26, 1926 – April 6, 2015), known professionally as James Best, was an American television, film, stage, and voice actor, as well as a writer, director, acting coach, artist, college professor, and musician. During a career that spanned more than 60 years, Best, who was known for his high-pitched, exasperated voice, performed not only in feature films, but also in scores of television series.

His appearances were almost all on Western programs, as well as various country music programs and talk shows. He gained recognition for his starring role as the bumbling Sheriff Rosco P. Coltrane in the action comedy series The Dukes of Hazzard, which originally aired on CBS from 1979 to 1985. He reprised the role in 1997 and 2000 for the made-for-television movies The Dukes of Hazzard: Reunion! and The Dukes of Hazzard: Hazzard in Hollywood (2000).

== Early years ==
James Best was born Jewel Franklin Guy on July 26, 1926, in Powderly, Kentucky, to Lark and Lena (née Everly) Guy. Lena Guy's brother was Ike Everly, the father of the pop duo the Everly Brothers. Best was raised by adoptive parents in Corydon, Indiana.

Best served in the United States Army Air Forces in World War II, training in 1944 in Biloxi, Mississippi, as a gunner on a B-17 bomber; but by the time he completed his training the war had almost ended, so he was assigned to the army's law enforcement section. In the military police, Best served in war-torn Germany immediately after the Nazi government's surrender in May 1945. While stationed in Germany, he transferred from the military police to an army unit of actors, who traveled around Europe performing plays for troops. Those experiences formed the beginning of his acting career.

== Film career ==
Best began his contract career in 1949 at Universal Studios, where he met fellow actors Julie Adams, Piper Laurie, Tony Curtis, Mamie Van Doren and Rock Hudson. Initially, he performed in several unbilled roles for Universal, such as in the 1950 film One Way Street, but billed performances soon followed that same year in the Westerns Comanche Territory, Winchester '73, and Kansas Raiders. Work in that genre continued to be an important part of his ongoing film career, including roles in The Cimarron Kid (1952); Seven Angry Men (1955), in which he portrays one of the sons of abolitionist John Brown; Last of the Badmen (1957); Cole Younger Gunfighter (1958); Ride Lonesome (1959); The Quick Gun (1964); and Firecreek (1968).

Best's film roles were not limited to Westerns. He also starred in the 1959 science fiction cult movie The Killer Shrews, and in its 2012 sequel Return of the Killer Shrews; as army medic Rhidges in the 1958 film adaptation of Norman Mailer's The Naked and the Dead; as escaped POW Carter in the James Stewart movie Shenandoah; as Dr. Ben Mizer in the 1966 comedy Three on a Couch; and as the cross-dressing Dewey Barksdale in the 1976 drama Ode to Billy Joe. He had the lead role in Samuel Fuller's Verboten! (1955), and played Burt Reynolds's partner Cully in the 1978 movie Hooper.

== Television ==
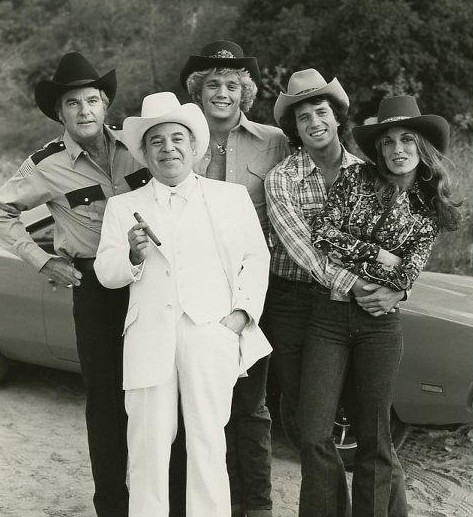
Best (top left) in his regular role as Sheriff Roscoe P. Coltrane in The Dukes of Hazzard

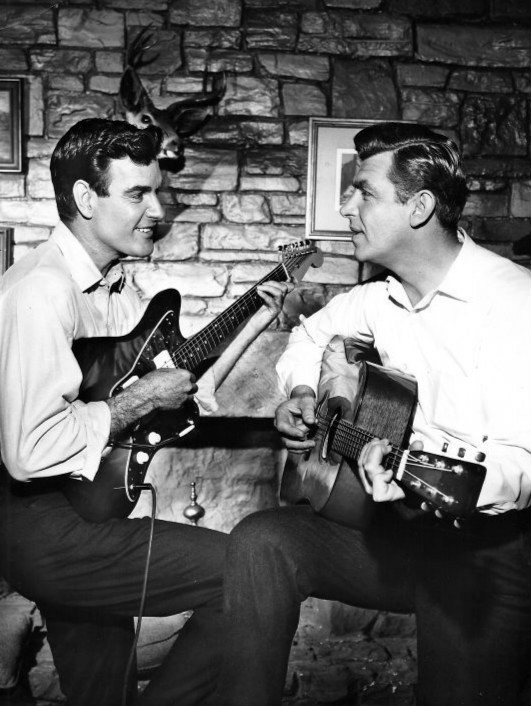
Best with Andy Griffith on CBS's The Andy Griffith Show (1961)

Best guest-starred more than 280 times in various television series. In 1954, he played outlaw Dave Ridley in an episode of Stories of the Century. In 1954, Best appeared twice on the syndicated Annie Oakley series. In 1955, he played Jim Blake on The Lone Ranger, Season 4, Episode 47. He was cast in the religion anthology series Crossroads, in its 1956 episode "The White Carnation." He was also cast on an episode of the NBC sitcom The People's Choice and in the crime drama Richard Diamond, Private Detective.

Best made four appearances on the syndicated anthology series Death Valley Days. His first role was as miner "Tiny" Stoker in the 1955 episode "Million Dollar Wedding".

In 1960, Best appeared in the episode "Love on Credit" of CBS's anthology series The DuPont Show with June Allyson. The same year, he guest-starred on The Andy Griffith Show as "The Guitar Player" (Season 1, Episode 3 and 31). He starred in three episodes of The Twilight Zone including "The Grave" (Season 3, Episode 7), "The Last Rites of Jeff Myrtlebank" (Season 3, Episode 23), and "Jess-Belle" (Season 4, Episode 7).

In 1958 he was the main character in Alfred Hitchcock Presents "Death Sentence" and again in 1961, he guest-starred in the Alfred Hitchcock Presents episode "Make My Death Bed". In 1963, he was cast as the courageous Wisconsin game warden Ernie Swift in the episode "Open Season" of another CBS anthology series, GE True, hosted by Jack Webb. In the story line, Swift's character faces the reprisal of organized crime after he tickets a gangster for illegal fishing.

In 1962, he played the part of Art Fuller in the episode "Incident of El Toro" on CBS's Rawhide; and in 1963, he returned to play Willie Cain in the episode "Incident at Spider Rock." Best made two guest appearances on Perry Mason. In 1963, he played title character Martin Potter in "The Case of the Surplus Suitor," and in 1966 he played defendant and oilman Allan Winford in "The Case of the Unwelcome Well." He appeared on a long list of other television series in the 1950s and 1960s, including Wagon Train (three times), Laramie (three times), The Adventures of Kit Carson, The Rebel, Bonanza, Sheriff of Cochise, Pony Express, Rescue 8, The Texan, Gunsmoke, Have Gun – Will Travel, The Barbara Stanwyck Show, Tombstone Territory, Whispering Smith, Trackdown, The Rifleman, Cheyenne, Stagecoach West, Wanted: Dead or Alive, Overland Trail, Bat Masterson, Alfred Hitchcock Presents, Combat!, The Green Hornet ("Deadline for Death"), The Mod Squad, I Spy, The Fugitive, and Flipper. He made a guest appearance on former costar Anne Francis's series Honey West in the 1965 episode "A Matter of Wife and Death".

=== The Dukes of Hazzard ===
Best's highest-profile role was as Sheriff Rosco P. Coltrane on CBS's The Dukes of Hazzard. He appeared during the entire run of the program, from 1979 until the end of the series in 1985. He later revealed that the caricature-like persona of Sheriff Coltrane was developed from a voice he used when playing with his young children. On set, Best was particularly close to Sorrell Booke, who played the character of Boss Hogg, who was both the boss and the brother-in-law of Rosco. The two actors became close friends; and according to interviews by the series' creators, the two often improvised their scenes together, making up their own dialogue as they went along. In the second season of the show, he temporarily left the show, due to a dispute over changing-room conditions. Best appeared in almost every episode of the series, with the exception of 5, throughout the run. Until his death, he remained close to actress Catherine Bach, who played the character of Daisy Duke; and long after the show's cancellation, she was a regular visitor to the website dedicated to Best's painting.

=== Later television career ===
In 1991, Best appeared in an episode of the NBC crime drama In the Heat of the Night. He portrayed retired sheriff and repentant killer Nathan Bedford in the episode "Sweet, Sweet Blues".

In August 2008, Best was presented the Florida Motion Picture and Television Association's Lifetime Achievement Award.

== Artist, teacher, writer, and other activities ==
Best later moved to Florida and taught at the University of Central Florida (Orlando). After semi-retiring, he administered a production company and accepted occasional acting roles. He also developed a reputation as an artist for his paintings of landscapes, scenes from The Dukes of Hazzard in collaboration with Scott Romine, and other subjects. Later, after residing for a while on Lake Murray near Columbia, South Carolina, he moved once again, this time to Hickory, North Carolina.

An acting coach too, Best taught drama and acting techniques for more than 25 years in Los Angeles. He also served as artist-in-residence and taught drama at the University of Mississippi (Oxford) for two years prior to his stint on The Dukes of Hazzard.

On November 9, 2014, Best and fellow actor Robert Fuller (along with their wives) attended the 100th birthday celebration of lifelong friend and fellow actor Norman Lloyd. Best said, "I had the honor to have been directed by Norman in a Hitchcock episode called 'The Jar.' Having worked with hundreds of directors in my career, I found very few that had Norman's qualities. He was most kind, gracious and patient with his actors. He is in all respects a complete gentleman in his personal life and I found it a genuine pleasure just to be in the presence of such a talented man. I am also doubly honored to consider him my friend. We are so blessed to have such a man among us for so long."

== Personal life ==
Best had a son, Gary, with his first wife. In 1959, he married his second wife, Jobee Ayers. The couple had two daughters, Janeen and JoJami, before divorcing in 1977. Best then married his third wife, Dorothy Collier, in 1986. He had three grandchildren.

He enjoyed a wide range of hobbies and interests and was an accomplished painter, held a black belt in karate, enjoyed writing, and ran his own acting school. His students included Lindsay Wagner, Roger Miller, Glen Campbell, Quentin Tarantino, and Regis Philbin. He was also an animal rights advocate.

James Best was a born-again Christian; when he converted is unknown, but it was sometime during or after The Dukes of Hazzard.

== Death ==
Best died on April 6, 2015, at the age of 88, in Hickory, North Carolina, from complications of pneumonia.

Prior to his death, Best's former Dukes of Hazzard co-star and longtime friend John Schneider said: "I laughed and learned more from Jimmie in one hour than from anyone else in a whole year." He also added that, when asked to cry for the camera, "(Best) would say, 'sure thing, which eye?' I'm forever thankful to have cut my teeth in the company of such a fine man." Nearly one year after Best's death, Schneider said about his working relationship with Best:

He was amazing in everything he did; he was not just a funny guy. In fact, I think the comedic timing came to him later on in life because before that he was a very serious actor. I was very fortunate to have grown up working with people like Jimmie Best and Denver Pyle and Sorrell Booke. Incredibly talented men, incredibly talented actors.

== Filmography ==
- One Way Street (1950) as Driver (uncredited)
- Comanche Territory (1950) as Sam
- I Was a Shoplifter (1950) as Police Broadcaster in Surveillance Plane (uncredited)
- Winchester '73 (1950) as Crater
- Peggy (1950) as Frank Addison
- Kansas Raiders (1950) as Cole Younger
- Target Unknown (1951) as Sergeant Ralph Phelps
- Air Cadet (1951) as Jerry Connell
- Apache Drums (1951) as Bert Keon
- Abbott and Costello Meet the Invisible Man (1951) as Tommy Nelson (Arthur Franz's stand-in)
- The Cimarron Kid (1952) as Bitter Creek Dalton
- About Face (1952) as Joe, Hal's Roommate
- Steel Town (1952) as Joe Rakich
- The Battle at Apache Pass (1952) as Corporal Hassett
- Ma and Pa Kettle at the Fair (1952) as Marvin Johnson
- Francis Goes to West Point (1952) as Corporal Ransom
- Flat Top (1952) as Radio Operator (uncredited)
- Seminole (1953) as Corporal Gerard
- Column South (1953) as Primrose
- The President's Lady (1953) as Samuel Donelson (uncredited)
- The Beast from 20,000 Fathoms (1953) as Charlie, Radar Man (uncredited)
- City of Bad Men (1953) as Deputy Gig (uncredited)
- Riders to the Stars (1954) as Sidney K. Fuller
- The Yellow Tomahawk (1954) as Private Bliss
- The Caine Mutiny (1954) as Lieutenant Jorgensen (uncredited)
- Return from the Sea (1954) as Barr
- The Raid (1954) as Lieutenant Robinson
- They Rode West (1954) as Lieutenant Finlay (uncredited)
- Seven Angry Men (1955) as Jason Brown
- A Man Called Peter (1955) as Man with Jane at Youth Rally (uncredited)
- The Eternal Sea (1955) as Student
- Top of the World (1955) as Colonel French's Orderly (uncredited)
- The Adventures of Champion (1955–1956, TV Series) (2 episodes)
  - (Season 1 Episode 13: "The Stone Heart") as Paul Kenyon
  - (Season 1 Episode 21: "Andrew and the Daily Double") as Mace Kincaid
- Death Valley Days (1955–1964, TV Series) (4 episodes)
  - (Season 3 Episode 12: "Million Dollar Wedding") as Tiny Stoker
  - (Season 11 Episode 2: "The $275,000 Sack of Flour") as Ruel Gridley
  - (Season 12 Episode 14: "Sixty-Seven Miles of Gold") as Jimmy Burns
  - (Season 13 Episode 6: "The Hero of Fort Halleck") as Jim Campbell
- Come Next Spring (1956) as Bill Jackson
- When Gangland Strikes (1956) as Jerry Ames (uncredited)
- Forbidden Planet (1956) as Crewman (uncredited)
- Gaby (1956) as Jim
- Calling Homicide (1956) as Arnie Arnholf
- The Rack (1956) as Millard Chilson Cassidy
- Last of the Badmen (1957) as Ted Hamilton
- Hot Summer Night (1957) as Kermit
- I Was a Teenage Werewolf (1957) as Kid at party who gets slapped (uncredited)
- Man on the Prowl (1957) as Doug Gerhardt
- Trackdown (1957–1958, TV Series) (3 episodes)
  - (Season 1 Episode 1: "The Marple Brothers") (1957) as Rand Marple
  - (Season 1 Episode 27: "The Mistake") (1958) as Bud Ehlers
  - (Season 2 Episode 12: "Sunday's Child") (1958) as Joe Sunday
- Have Gun – Will Travel (1957–1961, TV Series) (3 episodes)
  - (Season 1 Episode 10: "The Long Night") (1957) as Andy Fisher, one of three parties in danger of being hanged, along with Richard Boone and guest star Richard Schallert
  - (Season 4 Episode 17: "A Quiet Night in Town: Part 1") (1961) as Roy Smith
  - (Season 4 Episode 18: "A Quiet Night in Town: Part 2") (1961) as Roy Smith
- Cole Younger, Gunfighter (1958) as Kit Caswell
- The Restless Gun (1958) (Season 2 Episode 1: "Jebediah Bonner") as Jim Kenyon
- The Left Handed Gun (1958) as Tom Folliard
- Bat Masterson (1958) as Joe Best, murderer
- The Naked and the Dead (1958) as Private Rhidges
- Alfred Hitchcock Presents (1958–1961) (3 episodes)
  - (Season 3 Episode 30: "Death Sentence") as Norman Frayne
  - (Season 5 Episode 34: "Cell 227") (1960) as Hennessy
  - (Season 6 Episode 37: "Make My Death Bed") (1961) as Bish Darby
- Ride Lonesome (1959) as Billy John
- Verboten! (1959) as Sergeant David Brent
- The Killer Shrews (1959) as Thorne Sherman
- Cast a Long Shadow (1959) as Sam Mullen
- Wagon Train (1959–1960, TV Series) (3 episodes)
  - (Season 2 Episode 35: "The Andrew Hale Story") (1959) as Garth English
  - (Season 3 Episode 15: "The Colonel Harris Story") (1960) as Bowman Lewis
  - (Season 3 Episode 18: "The Clayton Tucker Story") (1960) as Art Bernard
- The Mountain Road (1960) as Niergaard
- The Andy Griffith Show (1960–1961, TV Series) (2 episodes) as Jim Lindsey
  - (Season 1 Episode 3: "The Guitar Player") (1960)
  - (Season 1 Episode 31: "The Guitar Player Returns") (1961)
- The Twilight Zone (1961–1963, TV Series) (3 episodes)
  - (Season 3 Episode 7: "The Grave") (1961) as Johnny Rob
  - (Season 3 Episode 23: "The Last Rites of Jeff Myrtlebank") (1962) as Jeff Myrtlebank
  - (Season 4 Episode 7: "Jess-Belle") as Billy Ben Turner
- Bonanza (1961–1968, TV Series) (3 episodes)
  - (Season 2 Episode 20: "The Fugitive") (1961) as Carl Reagan
  - (Season 5 Episode 11: "The Legacy") (1963) as Page
  - (Season 9 Episode 19: "The Price of Salt") (1968) as Sheriff Vern Schaler
- The Rifleman (1962, TV Series) (Season 4 Episode 29: "The Day a Town Slept") as Bob Barrett
- Bronco (1962, TV Series) (Season 4 Episode 18: "Then the Mountains") as Frankie Banton
- Cheyenne (1962, TV Series) (Season 7 Episode 2: "Satonka") as Ernie Riggins
- Black Gold (1962) as Jericho Larkin
- Shock Corridor (1963) as Stuart Couter
- The Fugitive (1963, TV Series) (Season 1 Episode 13: "Terror at High Point") as Dan Murray
- Perry Mason (1963–1966, TV Series) (2 episodes)
  - (Season 6 Episode 19: "The Case of the Surplus Suitor") (1963) as Martin Potter
  - (Season 9 Episode 25: "The Case of the Unwelcome Well") as Allan Winford
- Gunsmoke (1963–1969, TV Series) (3 episodes)
  - (Season 8 Episode 29: "With a Smile") (1963) as Dal Creed
  - (Season 9 Episode 14: "The Glory and the Mud") (1964) as Beal
  - (Season 15 Episode 7: "Charlie Noon") (1969) as Charlie Noon
- The Alfred Hitchcock Hour (1964) (Season 2 Episode 17: "The Jar") as Bis Darby
- Combat! (1964, TV Series) (Season 2 Episode 21: "Mail Call") as Trenton
- The Quick Gun (1964) as Sheriff Scotty Grant
- Flipper (1965, TV Series) (Season 1 Episode 29: "The Call of the Dolphin") as Dr. Peter Kellwin
- Black Spurs (1965) as Sheriff Ralph Elkins
- Shenandoah (1965) as Carter
- The Virginian (1965, TV series) (Season 4 Episode 14: "Letter of the Law") as Curt Westley
- Daniel Boone (1965) (Season 1 Episode 21: "The Devil's Four") as Wyatt
- Honey West (1965, TV series) (Season 1 Episode 4: "A Matter of Wife and Death") as Vince Zale
- Three on a Couch (1966) as Dr. Ben Mizer
- First to Fight (1967) as Gunnery Sergeant Ed Carnavan
- The Guns of Will Sonnett (1967–1969, TV Series) (2 episodes)
  - (Season 1 Episode 8: "Meeting at Devil's Fork") (1967) as Rake Hanley
  - (Season 2 Episode 15: "Robber's Roost") as Harley Bass
- Firecreek (1968) as Drew
- Sounder (1972) as Sheriff Charlie Young
- Hawkins (1973, TV Series) (Season 1 Episode 4: "Blood Feud") as Sheriff John Early
- Savages (1974, TV Movie) as Sheriff Bert Hamilton
- Ode to Billy Joe (1976) as Dewey Barksdale
- Gator (1976)
- Nickelodeon (1976) as Jim
- Rolling Thunder (1977) as Texan
- The Brain Machine (1977) as Reverend Emory Neill
- The End (1978) as Pacemaker Patient
- Hooper (1978) as Cully
- Centennial (1979, TV Mini-Series) (Season 1 Episode 12: "The Scream of Eagles") as Hank Garvey
- The Dukes of Hazzard (1979–1985, TV Series) (141 episodes) as Sheriff Rosco P. Coltrane
- Enos (1981, TV series) (Season 1 Episode 9: "Horse Cops") as Sheriff Rosco P. Coltrane
- The Dukes (1983, TV Series) (20 episodes) as Sheriff Rosco P. Coltrane
- In the Heat of the Night (1991, TV Series) (Season 5 Episode 8: "Sweet, Sweet Blues") as retired Sheriff Nathan Bedford – Crystal Reel Award, Best Actor
- The Dukes of Hazzard: Reunion! (1997, TV Movie) as Sheriff Rosco P. Coltrane
- Raney (1997) as Uncle Nate
- Death Mask (1998) as Wilbur Johnson
- The Dukes of Hazzard: Hazzard in Hollywood (2000, TV Movie) as Rosco P. Coltrane
- Hot Tamale (2006) as Hank Larson
- Moondance Alexander (2007) as Buck McClancy, a friend and storekeeper of the Alexanders (based on the life of real-life daughter Janeen)
- Return of the Killer Shrews (2012) as Thorne Sherman
- The Sweeter Side of Life (2013, TV Movie) as Paddy Kerrigan, the father of the protagonist (final film role)
