= Sara Niemietz discography =

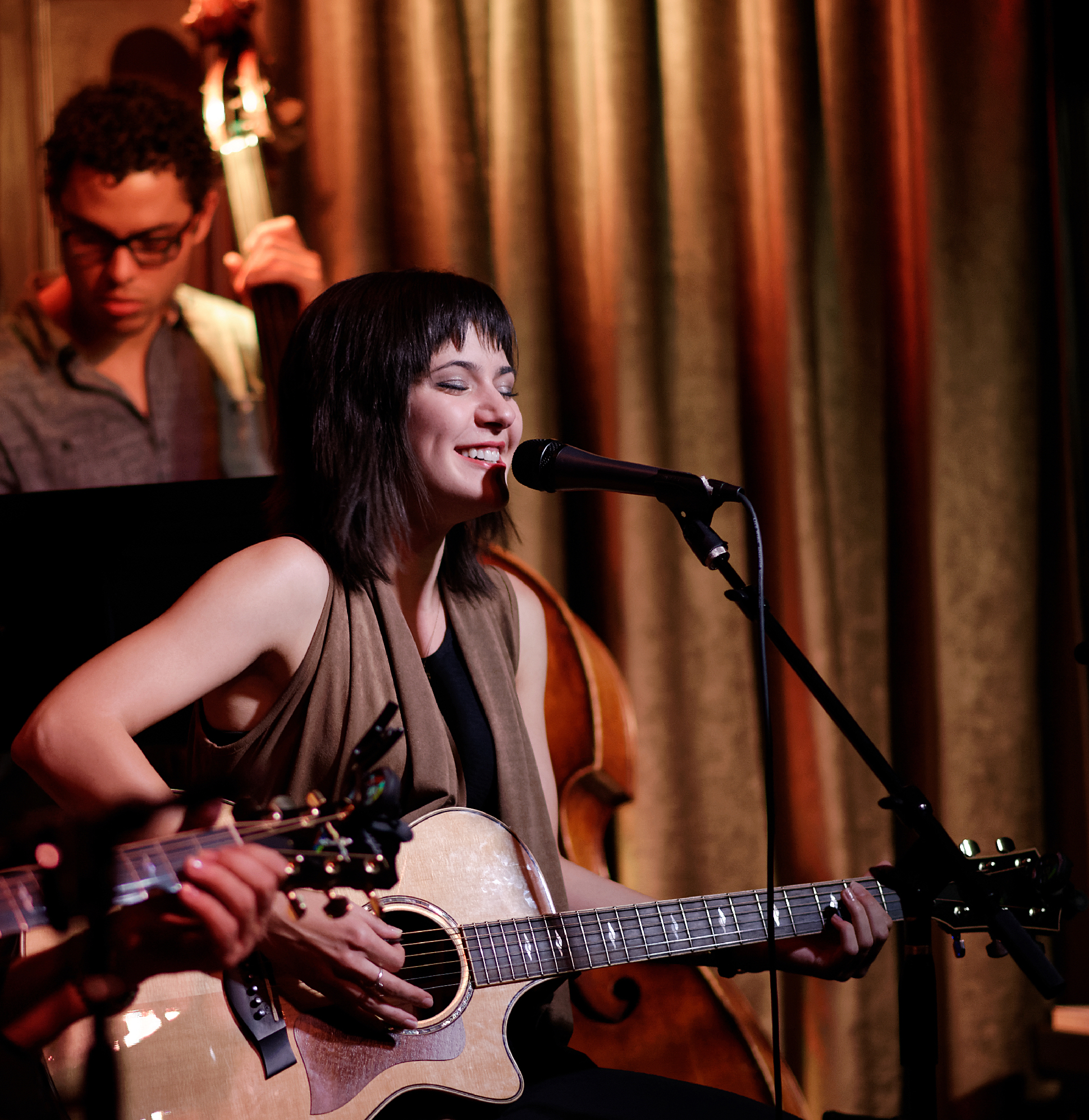
- Sara Niemietz performing in 2016
- Studio albums: 2
- Extended plays: 5
- Soundtrack albums: 8
- Live albums: 2
- Compilation albums: 21

Sara Niemietz is a vocalist, actress, musician, and composer with Broadway theatrical, soundtrack and live performance experience. She has co-produced music videos and albums with W. G. Snuffy Walden in his Taylor Made Studios since 2010. Niemietz became a featured cast member with Postmodern Jukebox in 2015. Musical influences include gospel, children's and family, stage musical, pop, rock, blues and jazz.

== Albums ==
=== As headliner ===
LPs

- Live at the Cat Club (Skooter, 2003)
- Travel Light (2017)
- Get Right (2019)
- twentytwenty (2020)
- Superman (2022)

EPs

- Without a Net (2006)
- Push Play (2012)
- Christmas Favorites (2012)
- By Request (2014)
- Fountain & Vine (2015)

=== As featured artist ===
Year	Album	Peak chart positions							Notes
Year	Album	Next Big Sound	Jazz Albums	Top Heatseekers	Top Independent Albums	Top Country Albums	Billboard 200	Top Current Album Sales	Notes
2012	N/A	14	—	—	—	—	—	—	An emerging artist chart
2012	Christmas Spirit	—	—	—	10	—	181	—	10. "Santa Claus Is Coming To Town"; duet with Richard Marx
2013	The Living Room Sessions	—	—	—	—	34	—	—	10. "Hooked on a Feeling"; duet with B. J. Thomas
2015	You Gotta Love the Life	—	17	—	—	—	—	—	2. "Feelin' for You"; co-written with Melissa Manchester
2015	Swipe Right For Vintage	—	5	19	—	—	—	—	12. "This Must Be the Place (Naive Melody)"; Scott Bradlee's Postmodern Jukebox
2015	Top Hat On Fleek	—	6	20	—	—	—	—	3. "Hey Ya!"; Scott Bradlee's Postmodern Jukebox
2016	PMJ And Chill	—	10	—	—	—	—	—	8. "Love Yourself"; Scott Bradlee's Postmodern Jukebox
2016	Swing the Vote!	—	11	—	—	—	—	—	11. Bad Romance (Sara Niemietz & The Sole Sisters)"; Scott Bradlee's Postmodern Jukebox
2016	The Essentials	—	2	5	—	—	—	—	17. "Hey Ya!"; Scott Bradlee's Postmodern Jukebox
2017	33 Resolutions Per Minute	—	8	—	—	—	—	—	3. "I Will Survive"; 8. "Bye Bye Bye" (Aubrey Logan, Sara Niemietz, Ariana Savalas & Sarah Reich); Scott Bradlee's Postmodern Jukebox
2017	Fake Blues	—	5	—	—	—	—	—	8. "Love Yourself"; Scott Bradlee's Postmodern Jukebox
2017	New Gramophone, Who Dis?	—	16	—	—	—	—	—	5. "Just What I Needed"; Scott Bradlee's Postmodern Jukebox
2017	The New Classics	—	5	8	—	—	—	—	5. "Time After Time"; 10. "Bye, Bye, Bye" (ft. Aubrey Logan, Ariana Savalas & Sara Niemietz); 12. "I Will Survive"; Scott Bradlee's Postmodern Jukebox
2018	Jazz Me Outside, Pt. 1	—	21	—	—	—	—	—	2. "Who Can It Be Now"; 6. "Straight Up" (Sara Niemietz, Olivia Kuper Harris & Vonzell Solomon); Scott Bradlee's Postmodern Jukebox
2018	The Essentials II	—	10	—	—	—	—	—	10. "Love Yourself"; Scott Bradlee's Postmodern Jukebox
2019	Sepia is the New Orange	—	15	—	—	—	—	—	3. "I Don’t Want To Miss A Thing"; Scott Bradlee's Postmodern Jukebox
2020	twentytwenty	—	—	—	—	—	—	91	Sara Niemietz live album
The Essentials — Billboard Year End Charts: Jazz Albums #11 (2017); The New Classics — First live album, televised on PBS

==== Soundtrack appearances ====
Year	Title	Label	Song
2004	Barbie as the Princess and the Pauper	Family Home	"I'm on My Way"
2005	The Exorcism of Emily Rose	Lakeshore	
2006	PollyWorld	Universal, Mattel, Curious	"Perfect Kinda Day"
2007	Moondance Alexander	Caption, Studio City, INgrooves	"It Only Takes One"
2009	The Uninvited	Lakeshore	
2011	In the Key of Eli	Scarpaci/Kell	"Set You Free"
2012	Mickey Matson and the Copperhead Conspiracy	10 West, EMC	"Never on My Own"
2012	Stetson, Street Dog of Park City	Campbell and Co.	"Never Too Far from Home"

== Singles ==
"Perfect Kinda Day" (2006)
Polly Pocket: PollyWorld

"EP/single" ("Perfect Kinda Day") from the album Polly Pocket: PollyWorld Soundtrack

- Released: 2006
- Format: CD
- Label: Mattel, Burger King
- Writer: "Perfect Kinda Day" — Amy Powers, Lukasz Gottwald (as Lukasz Gotwald), Marjorie Maye and Steve Wolf
- Sales: Worldwide product promo, unknown number of units
- Tracks: 1. "Perfect Kinda Day" — Sara Niemietz
- Bonus tracks: 2. "Work the Angles" — The Splinters – written by: Bob Mair, Nick Vincent

"Finest Hour" (2007)

"EP/single" ("Finest Hour") from the album ''Teen Witch the Musical''

- Released: January 20, 2007
- Format: CD
- Label: Caption/Studio City Sound
- Writer: Larry Weir, Cindy Valentine Leone
- Producer: Larry Weir, Tom Weir
- Tracks: 1. "Finest Hour" (Mainstream Mix), 2. "Finest Hour" (Hot/AC Mix), 3. "Finest Hour" (Remix)

"Popular Girl" (2007)
Teen Witch the Musical

"EP/single" ("Popular Girl") from the album ''Teen Witch the Musical''

- Released: January 29, 2007
- Format: CD
- Label: Caption/Studio City Sound
- Writer: Larry Weir
- Producer: Larry Weir, Tom Weir
- Tracks: 1. "Popular Girl" (Remix), 2. "Popular Girl" (Album Mix), 3. Popular Girl (Karaoke Version)

"Santa Claus Is Coming to Town" (2012)
with Richard Marx

"Santa Claus Is Coming to Town" (Duet with Richard Marx) from the album Christmas Spirit

- Released: 22 October 2012
- Format: LP/CD/Digital
- Label: Zanzibar, TourDeForce
- Writers: John Frederick Coots, Haven Gillespie
- Producer: Richard Marx

"Hooked on a Feeling" (2013)
with B. J. Thomas

"Hooked on a Feeling" (Duet with B. J. Thomas) from the album The Living Room Sessions

- Released: 3 June 2013
- Format: LP/CD
- Label: Wrinkled
- Writer: Mark James
- Producer: Kyle Lehning

"This Must Be the Place (Naive Melody)" (2015)
with Postmodern Jukebox

"This Must Be the Place (Naive Melody)" (Postmodern Jukebox) from the album Swipe Right For Vintage

- Released: 30 July 2015
- Format: LP/Digital
- Label: mudhutdigital.com
- Writers: David Byrne, Chris Frantz, Jerry Harrison, Tina Weymouth

"Hey Ya!" (2015)
with Postmodern Jukebox

"Hey Ya!" (Postmodern Jukebox) from the album ''Top Hat on Fleek''

- Released: 24 September 2015
- Format: LP/Digital
- Label: mudhutdigital.com
- Writers: André 3000

"Pokémon Theme Song" (2015)
with Postmodern Jukebox

Pokémon Theme Song (Postmodern Jukebox)

- Released: 10 November 2015
- Format: LP/iTunes
- Label: mudhutdigital.com
- Writers: Jason Paige

"Love Yourself" (2016)
with Postmodern Jukebox

""Love Yourself"" (Postmodern Jukebox) from the album ''PMJ Is for Lovers: The Love Song Collection''

- Released: 21 January 2016
- Format: LP/Digital
- Label: mudhutdigital.com
- Writers:
  - Justin Bieber
  - Ed Sheeran
  - Benjamin Levin

== YouTube videos ==
Date	Song	Covered Artist	Total Views	YouTube Music Chart Peak Positions			
Date	Song	Covered Artist	Total Views	Most Viewed	Most Discussed	Top Rated	Top Favorited
Jul 30 2011	"Rolling in the Deep"	Adele	8,701,933	—	—	—	—
Mar 24 2011	"Set Fire to the Rain"	Adele	1,559,306	150th (3-26-11)	10th (3-25-11)	33rd (3-26-11)	45th (3-26-11)
Mar 10 2011	"Price Tag" (with Jake Coco)	Jessie J	688,493	171st (3-12-11)	20th (3-12-11)	35th (3-11-11)	65th (3-12-11)
Oct 11 2011	"Stereo Hearts"	Gym Class Heroes; Adam Levine	501,529	—	48th (10-12-11)	41st (10-12-11)	65th (10-12-11)
Feb 9 2011	"Talking to the Moon"	Bruno Mars	501,529	—	22nd (2-11-10)	87th (2-11-10)	—
Nov 20 2011	"Stand by Me" (Live)	Ben E. King	999,049	—	—	—	—
Dec 4 2010	"Need You Now"	Lady Antebellum	503,545	—	32nd (12-6-10)	—	—
May 4, 2011	"Tighten Up"; The Ellen DeGeneres Show	The Black Keys	184,284	—	—	—	—
Sep 12 2010	"I Can't Stand the Rain"	Ann Peebles	250,009	—	46th (9-14-10)	—	—
Feb 23 2011	"Jar of Hearts"	Christina Perri	252,984	—	20th (2-24-11)	70th (2-24-11)	—
Dec 27 2010	"I Will" (with W. G. Snuffy Walden)	The Beatles	320,642	—	26th (11-28-10)	105th (11-28-10)	—
Apr 27 2011	"I Smile" (Live) (with W. G. Snuffy Walden)	Kirk Franklin	183,160	—	14th (4-28-11)	74th (4-29-11)	—
May 20, 2011	"Keep Coming Back" (Live); Duet with Richard Marx	Richard Marx	184,783	—	18th (5-22-11)	98th (5-20-11)	73rd (5-22-11)
May 14, 2011	"Feeling Good"	Nina Simone	191,981	—	20th (5-17-11)	48th (5-16-11)	62nd (5-16-11)
Feb 23 2012	"World of My Own"	Sara Niemietz	168,921	—	—	—	—
Dec 15 2010	"All I Want For Christmas Is You" (with Randy Kerber)	Vince Vance & The Valiants	124,745	—	37th (12-16-10)	—	—
Jan 13 2012	"Evening"	Sara Niemietz; W. G. Snuffy Walden	121,282	—	—	—	—
Sep 15 2012	"At Last"	Etta James	363,879	—	—	—	—
Selected releases with counts January 7, 2016; Current counts: Licensing Sony Music Corp. -
