= The Living Room Sessions (B. J. Thomas album) =

Studio album by B.J. Thomas
- Released: April 2, 2013
- Recorded: 2012
- Genre: Country, pop, soft rock
- Length: 42:32
- Label: Wrinkled Records
- Producer: Kyle Lehning

Singles from The Living Room Sessions
- 1. "I Just Can't Help Believing" Released: June 3, 2013

The Living Room Sessions (2013) is B.J. Thomas' first "unplugged" album, celebrating fifty years in the recording industry and forty-seven years since his first gold record (a cover of the Hank Williams song, "I'm So Lonesome I Could Cry"). The Living Room Sessions offers many of Thomas' most recognizable hits, the album was produced to instill the atmosphere of an intimate setting and includes duet performances from some of Thomas' favorite artists.

== Background ==
=== B.J. Thomas ===
Billboard has ranked B.J. Thomas in the fifty most played artists in the last fifty years. Thomas became the 60th member of The Grand Ole Opry on August 7, 1981, his 39th birthday. Thomas was inducted into the Country Music Hall of Fame and Museum, Walkway of Stars in 1983.

"(Hey Won't You Play) Another Somebody Done Somebody Wrong Song" (1975), written by Larry Butler and Chips Moman, had the distinction of achieving No. 1 on the Billboard Hot 100 and the Hot Country Songs charts. The song was also nominated Single of the Year, by the Academy of Country Music in 1975.

"Raindrops Keep Fallin' on My Head" was featured in the 1969 film, Butch Cassidy and the Sundance Kid and won an Academy Award for Best Original Song. Written by Hal David and Burt Bacharach, the song was a No. 1 hit for Thomas and earned him an appearance on The Ed Sullivan Show. Movie goers became re-acquainted with "Raindrops Keep Fallin' on My Head" when it was included in the film Spider-Man 2 (2004). The 1969 recording was inducted into the 2014 Grammy Hall of Fame.

=== Production ===
Two time Academy of Country Music Award nominee Kyle Lehning produced The Living Room Sessions at Sound Stage Studio, Nashville, Tennessee, in 2012. Lehning and Thomas kept the pre-production details simple, realizing that the songs would naturally lend themselves to the acoustic format and trusted the musicians (Lehning and the Nashville "cats") to deliver the acoustic interpretations with minimal melodic adjustments to the songs.

Lehning and the Nashville "cats"

- Bryan Sutton – acoustic and gut string guitar, mandolin, banjo and dobro (has worked with Ricky Skaggs and the Dixie Chicks)
- John Willis – electric, acoustic, gut string guitar and dobro (has worked with Alan Jackson, Kenny Chesney, America)
- Viktor Krauss – upright bass (has worked with Peter Rowan, Jerry Douglas and Lyle Lovett) – Viktor Krauss is the brother of Alison Krauss.
- Steve Brewster – drums (has worked with Richard Marx and Dierks Bentley)

==== Release ====
- Pre-release of limited-edition, autographed versions of The Living Room Sessions went on sale on March 1, 2013.

=== Collaborations ===
Etta Britt ("New Looks from an Old Lover")
Etta Britt was the first artist invited to sign with Wrinkled Records and released her debut album, Out of the Shadows in 2012. Behind the scenes of the music industry she has worked with artists such as Engelbert Humperdinck and REO Speedwagon. In 1978, she joined Dave & Sugar, who were nominated by the Country Music Association as Vocal Group of the Year, in 1978 and 1979. Etta Britt joins Thomas on his 1983, No. 1 Hot Country Songs hit, "New Looks from an Old Lover", co-written by Gloria Thomas.

Vince Gill ("I Just Can't Help Believing")

Vince Gill first hit the Billboard Magazine charts as the front man for Pure Prairie League; the album Can't Hold Back (1979) hit No. 124 on the Billboard 200. Since that time, Gill has had a successful solo career with twenty Grammy and eleven Country Music Association awards, five of those for Male Vocalist of the Year and two for Entertainer of the Year (1993-1994). Gill is the only artist to win the Male Vocalist award for five consecutive years (1991-1995).

Lyle Lovett ("Raindrops Keep Falling on My Head")
Lyle Lovett is a multiple Grammy Award winner. His wins include Best Country Vocal Performance, Male (Lyle Lovett And His Large Band, 1989), Best Country Album (The Road to Ensenada, 1996), Best Country Performance by a Duo Or Group With Vocal ("Blues For Dixie", 1994) and Best Pop Vocal Collaboration ("Funny How Time Slips Away", 1994). Lovett is often noted for his ability to fold Big band and Swing genre music into contemporary hits.

Richard Marx ("(Hey Won't You Play) Another Somebody Done Somebody Wrong Song")
Richard Marx has been a regular on the Billboard Magazine charts since 1987, including Billboard Hot 100 number one Singles for: "Hold On to the Nights" (1988), "Right Here Waiting" (1989) and "Satisfied" (1989). In 2004, he won the Grammy Award, Song of the Year, for "Dance with My Father". Marx hit The Billboard 200 chart again in 2012, with his album Christmas Spirit.

Keb' Mo' ("Most of All")
Keb' Mo' is known as a post-modern bluesman, with three Grammy Awards for Best Contemporary Blues Album, Just Like You (1996), Slow Down (1998) and Keep It Simple (2004). In addition to vocals, Keb' Mo' plays guitar, harmonica, banjo, keyboards, steel drums and upright bass. He was the guitarist on several Papa John Creach albums, credited as Kevin Moore.

Sara Niemietz ("Hooked on a Feeling")

Well, that's just incredible, isn't it? What's her name? Sara? Boy, she can really sing. [...] She is so cute, how old is she? Four ... and who taught her the words? ... she knows the words to all my songs? I don't know what to say.

— B.J. Thomas, March 29, 1997

Sara Niemietz first met B.J. Thomas in 1997, when he helped the four-year-old Sara onto the stage during his performance of "Hooked on a Feeling" as she kept singing along in the front row. The following short duet was uploaded to Sara's YouTube channel.
In the following fifteen year, Sara Niemietz made her name as a singer on Broadway, where she played a young Carol Burnett in Hollywood Arms. She landed the role of Patrice in the Los Angeles premiere of the Jason Robert Brown and Dan Elish musical, 13 and the supporting role of Polly in Akeelah and the Bee.
She released four independent records and dozens of professionally mastered music-videos, worked with Emmy Award winner W. G. Snuffy Walden and made singing appearances on The Ellen DeGeneres Show and Richard Marx', A Night Out With Friends on PBS. On June 10, 2012, Thomas and Sara Niemetz were reunited on stage.

Isaac Slade ("I'm So Lonesome I Could Cry")
Isaac Slade, the lead singer of The Fray, is a pianist, composer and the co-writer of "How to Save a Life" (2006), the seventh longest charting single on the Billboard Hot 100.

Steve Tyrell ("Rock and Roll Lullaby")
Steve Tyrell managed Thomas and was the original producer on "Rock and Roll Lullaby" (Scepter Records). As a single, the song was an Adult Contemporary No. 1 hit and reached No. 15 on Billboard Hot 100 in 1975.

== Critical reception ==
Bob Paxman, "The Living Room Sessions by B.J. Thomas", Country Weekly, April 2, 2013
The overall recording is solid, not your standard "Greatest Hits Revisited" package. And surprisingly, you don't miss the orchestrations that marked the earlier versions—the acoustic instruments more than capably fill in.

Stephen Thomas Erlewine, "B.J. Thomas The Living Room Sessions review", AllMusic
Despite the preponderance of guests -- Steve Tyrell, Etta Britt, and Sara Niemietz also appear, leaving just a third of the album to B.J. himself -- this amiable acoustic album is a showcase for Thomas, who hasn't seemed to lose much vocally, and remains an engaging, friendly presence on record.

Edward Morris, "B.J. Thomas Bows Duet Album of Hits, The Living Room Sessions", CMT News, April 3, 2013
The Living Room Sessions is free of gospel. But the album does offer a fair sampling of Thomas' pop and country mastery via hits he had between 1966 and 1983. He enlists Isaac Slade, of the rock band the Fray, to assist him on "I'm So Lonesome I Could Cry." Gill chimes in on "I Just Can't Help Believing." Keb' Mo' shares the mic on "Most of All."
Marx blends voices with Thomas on "(Hey Won't You Play) Another Somebody Done Somebody Wrong Song." Jazz and pop singer Steve Tyrell joins in on "Rock and Roll Lullaby." Thomas tapped touring and studio singer Etta Britt for the sultry "New Looks From an Old Lover" and newcomer Sara Niemietz for "Hooked on a Feeling." Lovett is the vocally canny accomplice on "Raindrops."
Thomas solos on the remaining four songs: "Don't Worry Baby," "Eyes of a New York Woman," "Whatever Happened to Old Fashioned Love" and "Everybody's Out of Town."

Pam Stadel, "Digital Rodeo Music Reviews B.J. Thomas, Mark Cooke, The Mavericks", Digital Rodeo
The Living Room Sessions is recorded in a simple way and very close to the original songs. The instrumentation is phenomenal and the production is outstanding. Vocals? All I can say is B.J. Thomas has aged like a bottle of fine wine—the older he gets, the better he gets—period. For those that remember him from the beginning to the new crowds today, get this album; It's available this week. You won't be sorry.

== Track listing ==
B.J. Thomas The Living Room Sessions (2013)
No.	Title	Writer(s)	Length
1.	"Don't Worry Baby"	Roger Val Christian, Brian Wilson	3:50
2.	"I Just Can't Help Believing" (B.J. Thomas featuring Vince Gill)	Barry Mann, Cynthia Weil	3:47
3.	"Most of All" (B.J. Thomas featuring Keb' Mo')	Buddy Buie, James B. Cobb Jr.	3:46
4.	"Eyes of a New York Woman"	Mark James	3:13
5.	"(Hey Won't You Play) Another Somebody Done Somebody Wrong Song" (B.J. Thomas featuring Richard Marx)	Larry Butler, Chips Moman	3:19
6.	"I'm So Lonesome I Could Cry" (B.J. Thomas featuring Isaac Slade)	Hank Williams	3:22
7.	"Rock and Roll Lullaby" (B.J. Thomas featuring Steve Tyrell)	Barry Mann, Cynthia Weil	4:27
8.	"New Looks from an Old Lover" (B.J. Thomas featuring Etta Britt)	Hollis R. "Red Lane" DeLaughter, Lathan Hudson, Gloria Thomas	3:27
9.	"Whatever Happened Old Fashioned Love"	Lewis Anderson	3:47
10.	"Hooked on a Feeling" (B.J. Thomas featuring Sara Niemietz)	Mark James	3:00
11.	"Raindrops Keep Falling on My Head" (B.J. Thomas featuring Lyle Lovett)	Burt Bacharach, Hal David	3:00
12.	"Everybody's Out of Town"	Burt Bacharach, Hal David	3:34

== Personnel ==
=== Primary artists ===
- Etta Britt
- Vince Gill
- Lyle Lovett
- Richard Marx
- Keb' Mo'
- Sara Niemietz
- Isaac Slade
- B.J. Thomas
- Steve Tyrell

=== Musicians ===
- Bryan Sutton – banjo, dobro, guitar (acoustic), gut string guitar, mandolin
- Viktor Krauss– bass (upright)
- Steve Brewster – drums, percussion
- John Willis – dobro, guitar (acoustic), guitar (electric), gut string guitar
- Nate Mann – rhythm
- Tania Hanscheroff – vocals (background)

=== Production ===
- Jon Allen – vocal engineer
- Ryan Carr – overdub engineer
- Maggie Berry – design
- Justin Francis – assistant engineer
- Katie Gillon – art direction
- Josiah Hendler – vocal engineer
- Luellyn Latocki Hensley – art direction
- Jason Lehning – overdub engineer
- Jordan Lehning – overdub engineer
- Kyle Lehning – mixing, producer
- Lisa Proctor – groomer
- Doug Sax – mastering
- Kevin Sokolnicki – overdub engineer
- Angela Talley – photography
- Casey Wood – engineer

=== Composers ===
- Lewis Anderson
- Burt Bacharach
- Buddy Buie
- Larry Butler
- Roger Val Christian
- James B. Cobb Jr.
- Hal David
- Hollis R. "Red Lane" DeLaughter
- Lathan Hudson
- Mark James
- Barry Mann
- Chips Moman
- Gloria Thomas
- Cynthia Weil
- Hank Williams
- Brian Wilson

=== Popularity of re-released songs ===
B. J. Thomas—Chart positions of songs re-released on The Living Room Sessions
Track	Title	Year	Hot 100	AC	Country singles
1	"Don't Worry Baby"	1977	No. 17	No. 2	—
2	"I Just Can't Help Believing"	1970	No. 9	No. 1	—
3	"Most of All"	1971	No. 38	No. 2	—
4	"Eyes of a New York Woman"	1968	No. 28	—	—
5	"(Hey Won't You Play) Another Somebody Done Somebody Wrong Song"	1975	No. 1	No. 1	No. 1
6	"I'm So Lonesome I Could Cry"	1966	No. 8	—	—
7	"Rock and Roll Lullaby"	1972	No. 15	No. 1	—
8	"New Looks from an Old Lover"	1983	—	—	No. 1
9	"Whatever Happened Old Fashioned Love"	1983	No. 93	No. 13	No. 1
10	"Hooked on a Feeling"	1969	No. 5	—	—
11	"Raindrops Keep Falling on My Head"	1969-70	No. 1	No. 1	—
12	"Everybody's Out of Town"	1970	No. 26	No. 3	—

== Chart performance ==
Chart (2013)	Peak position
U.S. Billboard Top Country Albums	39
