= Christmas Favorites (Sara Niemietz EP) =

EP by Sara Niemietz
- Released: November 26, 2012
- Recorded: 2012
- Genre: Christmas music
- Length: 21:07
- Label: Indie
- Producers: W. G. Snuffy Walden, Sara Niemietz

Sara Niemietz chronology
Push Play	Christmas Favorites

Christmas Favorites (2012) is an EP album introduced for digital distribution by Sara Niemietz.

2012 was Sara Niemietz' third year for publishing traditional Christmas song covers, teaming with Randy Kerber on "All I Want for Christmas Is You" (Vince Vance & The Valiants) in 2010. In 2011, a various-artists, compilation album was released on YouTube and iTunes (A YouTube Christmas) with Niemietz and Kerber performing Bing Crosby's, 1943 top ten hit, "I'll Be Home for Christmas".

== Background ==
Christmas Favorites was recorded at Taylor Made Studios and co-produced by Emmy Award winner W. G. Snuffy Walden. Walden accompanies Niemietz on guitar with Oscar and Grammy nominated, Randy Kerber accompanying on piano. Andrew Shulman, former principal cellist of the Philharmonia Orchestra, plays cello with eight time BMI TV Music Award winner, Bennett Salvay, arranging for cello. Veteran studio musician, George Doering, accompanies on guitar, electric guitar, bass and drums.

In addition to Christmas Favorites, Niemietz is featured on Richard Marx' 2012, Christmas album entitled, Christmas Spirit. With featured artists Sara Niemietz, Kenny Loggins and Sara Watkins, Marx' Christmas Spirit made the end of year Billboard Magazine charts for The Billboard 200 at #181, Top Holiday Albums at #21 and Top Independent Albums at #10.

== Artists ==
"This Christmas"

Sara Niemietz - vocals
W.G. Snuffy Walden - guitar and bowed guitar
George Doering - various percussion

"The Christmas Song"

Sara Niemietz - vocals
Randy Kerber - piano

"Winter Wonderland"

Sara Niemietz - vocals, sleigh bells
George Doering - guitar, bass, drums

O Holy Night

Sara Niemietz - vocals
George Doering - guitar

"Mary, Did You Know"

Sara Niemietz - vocals:
Andrew Shulman - cello
Bennett Salvay - cello arrangement
W.G. Snuffy Walden - nylon guitar
George Doering - electric guitar

"Silent Night"

Sara Niemietz - vocals
vocal arrangement -

Sara Niemietz
W.G. Snuffy Walden
Randy Kerber

== Track listing ==
Christmas Favorites

- Released: 26 November 2012
- Format: Digital download
- Label: Indie
- Producer: W.G. Snuffy Walden, Sara Niemietz

Track listing for Christmas Favorites (2012) _{(all vocals by Sara Niemietz)}
No.	Title	Writer(s)	Length
1.	"This Christmas"	Nadine McKinnor, Donny Pitts	2:58
2.	"The Christmas Song"	Gilbert O'Sullivan	4:17
3.	"Winter Wonderland"	Felix Bernard, Richard B. Smith	2:56
4.	"O Holy Night"	Adolphe Adam, John Sullivan Dwight	4:14
5.	"Mary, Did You Know?"	Mark Lowry, Buddy Greene	4:00
6.	"Silent Night"	Franz Xaver Gruber, Joseph Mohr	3:12
