= Lauren Ellis =

Lauren Ellis may refer to:

- Lauren Ellis (cyclist) (born 1989), New Zealand track cyclist
- Lauren Ellis (musician), American blues musician
