= Twentytwenty (Sara Niemietz album) =

twentytwenty

Live album by Sara Niemietz
- Released: October 16, 2020
- Recorded: February 28, 2020
- Studio: Apogee Studios, Santa Monica, CA
- Genre: rock
- Label: Saranade Music, Taylor Made Music
- Producer: W.G. Snuffy Walden and Sara Niemietz

Sara Niemietz chronology
Get Right (2019)	twentytwenty (2020)

Singles from Twentytwenty
- 1. "Made to Last (Live)" Released: June 26, 2020; 2. "Monroe (Live)" Released: July 31, 2020; 3. "On Ten (Live)" Released: September 25, 2020; 4. "All Your Love (Live)" Released: November 13, 2020

twentytwenty is a live album by Sara Niemietz. Recorded just days before the COVID-19 pandemic lock-down (February 27 and 28, 2020), at Apogee Studios in Santa Monica, California, the digital and CD-ROM versions contain over sixty-nine minutes of music. New arrangements of songs from previously released albums, Get Right (2019) and Travel Light (2017), had matured, and the group (Niemietz, W.G. Snuffy Walden and Jonathan Richards) wanted to record the updated versions, and four new songs, before a live audience. Martin Diller (drums), Andrew Kesler (keys), Alex Nester (vocals) and Mollie Weaver (vocals) also perform on twentytwenty. In addition to the four music videos released as singles, Niemietz created twelve podcasts documenting the progression of each rendition of the songs.

== Track listing ==
=== CD and digital ===
twentytwenty CD and Digital release
No.	Title	Writer(s)	Length
1.	"Smile (Live)"	Charlie Chaplin	1:28
2.	"I Smile (Live)"	Kirk Franklin	3:34
3.	"Don't Walk Me Home (Live)"	Sara Niemietz, W.G. Snuffy Walden, Jeff Cohen	03:57
4.	"Made to Last (Live)"	Sara Niemietz, W.G. Snuffy Walden	03:18
5.	"Monroe (Live)"	Sara Niemietz, W.G. Snuffy Walden	03:49
6.	"Let Me Be (Live)"	Sara Niemietz	05:07
7.	"The Nearness of You (Live)"	Hoagy Carmichael and Ned Washington	07:19
8.	"Go with the Flow (Live)"	Sara Niemietz	04:06
9.	"All Your Love (Live)"	Sara Niemietz	03:07
10.	"Feet Don't Touch the Floor (Live)"	Sara Niemietz	03:52
11.	"Calling You (Live)"	Bob Telson	05:24
12.	"Hear Me Now (Live)"	Jeff Cohen, Sara Niemietz, W.G. Snuffy Walden, Tim Niemietz	04:01
13.	"Out of Order (Live)"	Sara Niemietz	03:35
14.	"Shine (Live)"	Sara Niemietz, W.G. Snuffy Walden	03:32
15.	"Waiting on the Day (Live)"	Sara Niemietz, W.G. Snuffy Walden, Jeff Cohen	03:32
16.	"On Ten (Live)"	Sara Niemietz, W.G. Snuffy Walden	03:44
17.	"Stand by Me (Live)"	Ben E. King, Jerry Leiber and Mike Stoller	06:20
Total length:			69:48

=== LP vinyl ===
twentytwenty Vinyl release
No.	Title	Writer(s)	Length
1.	"Made to Last (Live)"	Sara Niemietz, W.G. Snuffy Walden	03:18
2.	"Monroe (Live)"	Sara Niemietz, W.G. Snuffy Walden	03:49
3.	"Let Me Be (Live)"	Sara Niemietz	05:07
4.	"Go with the Flow (Live)"	Sara Niemietz	04:06
5.	"All Your Love (Live)"	Sara Niemietz	03:07
6.	"Feet Don't Touch the Floor (Live)"	Sara Niemietz	03:52
7.	"Hear Me Now (Live)"	Jeff Cohen, Sara Niemietz, W.G. Snuffy Walden, Tim Niemietz	04:01
8.	"Out of Order (Live)"	Sara Niemietz	03:35
9.	"Shine (Live)"	Sara Niemietz, W.G. Snuffy Walden	03:32
10.	"Waiting on the Day (Live)"	Sara Niemietz, W.G. Snuffy Walden, Jeff Cohen	03:32
11.	"On Ten (Live)"	Sara Niemietz, W.G. Snuffy Walden	03:44
Total length:			39:51

=== DVD ===
twentytwenty DVD release
No.	Title	Writer(s)	Length
1.	"Intro" (Marc Whitmore)
2.	"Don't Walk Me Home (Live)"	Sara Niemietz, W.G. Snuffy Walden, Jeff Cohen
3.	"Made to Last (Live)"	Sara Niemietz, W.G. Snuffy Walden
4.	"Monroe (Live)"	Sara Niemietz, W.G. Snuffy Walden
5.	"Let Me Be (Live)"	Sara Niemietz
6.	"Go with the Flow (Live)"	Sara Niemietz
7.	"All Your Love (Live)"	Sara Niemietz
8.	"Feet Don't Touch the Floor (Live)"	Sara Niemietz
9.	"Calling You (Live)"	Bob Telson
10.	"Hear Me Now (Live)"	Jeff Cohen, Sara Niemietz, W.G. Snuffy Walden, Tim Niemietz
11.	"Out of Order (Live)"	Sara Niemietz
12.	"Shine (Live)"	Sara Niemietz, W.G. Snuffy Walden
13.	"Waiting on the Day (Live)"	Sara Niemietz, W.G. Snuffy Walden, Jeff Cohen
14.	"On Ten (Live)"	Sara Niemietz, W.G. Snuffy Walden
Total length:			51:04

== Charts ==
Chart (2020)	Peak position
Billboard Top Current Album Sales	91
