= Christmas Favorites =

Christmas Favorites may refer to:

- Christmas Favorites (Il Volo EP), 2011
- Christmas Favorites (Sara Niemietz EP), 2012
- Christmas Favorites, a 1991 album by Elvis Presley and Jim Reeves
