= Fountain & Vine =

EP by Sara Niemietz

EP by Sara Niemietz
- Released: September 22, 2015
- Recorded: Taylor Made Studios; Los Angeles, California
- Genres: Rock, jazz, blues
- Length: 20:41
- Language: English
- Labels: Levi Snuff Music; Saranade Music
- Producers: W. G. Snuffy Walden, Sara Niemietz, Keb' Mo'

Sara Niemietz chronology
By Request	Fountain & Vine

Fountain & Vine is the sixth independent CD release for singer, songwriter and actress Sara Niemietz. Produced by W. G. Snuffy Walden, Sara Niemietz and Keb' Mo'; Fountain & Vine is an EP consisting of six original songs.

== Description ==
Niemietz describes her musical style as, "Popular music with a shadow of blues and the lilt of jazz!" All of the songs on Fountain & Vine are written and performed by Niemietz, co-written with W. G. Snuffy Walden and blues musician Keb' Mo' on several songs. The album was released with a music-video for track four, "Taxi Outside", filmed in and around the Hollywood, California, area with stage performance scenes filmed at the Club 5 Lounge in Los Angeles.

Coinciding with the publication of Fountain & Vine, a collaborative music-video was released on August 20, with Niemietz fronting Postmodern Jukebox's rendition of Talking Heads' "This Must Be the Place" (1983), a song which appears on Postmodern Jukebox's Swipe Right for Vintage album. Niemietz performed at the Governor's Ball Emmy Awards after-party on September 20. A second collaboration video with Postmodern Jukebox, a cover of "Hey Ya!" (2003) by Outkast, earned a mention in the online version of Time magazine, and for Billboard, Malorie McCall wrote, "Niemetz effortless control and wide vocal range help bring a fullness accompanied by an old fashioned band."

== Musicians ==
- Gordon Campbell, drums
- George Doering, guitar
- Peter Erskine, drums
- Keb' Mo', guitar
- Sara Niemietz, vocals
- Darek Oles, bass
- Tim Pierce, guitar, bass
- Matt Rollings, piano
- W.G. Snuffy Walden, guitar, piano, synths and programming
- Freddie Washington, bass

== Production ==
- Produced by: W.G. Snuffy Walden, Sara Niemietz with Keb Mo' ("Out of Order" and "Go With The Flow")
- Recorded at: Taylor Made Studios
- Engineering and mixing: George Landress
- Mastering: Dave Donnely (DNA Mastering)
- CD design: Kiya Wilson
- Music video:("Taxi Outside")

Director/producer: Sacha Smith
Executive producer: Edgar Struble
Director of photography: Nick Rupp
Wardrobe: Bethany Struble
Makeup: Cherish Brook Hill
Filmed in Hollywood and the Club 5 Lounge in Los Angeles

== Track listing ==
Track listing for Fountain & Vine (2015)
No.	Title	Writer(s)	Length
1.	"Out of Order"	Sara Niemietz	4:01
2.	"I Thought I Could Fly"	Sara Niemietz, W.G. Snuffy Walden	3:31
3.	"You Get What You See"	Sara Niemietz, W.G. Snuffy Walden	3:07
4.	"Taxi Outside"	Sara Niemietz, Kevin Moore, W.G. Snuffy Walden	3:09
5.	"Go With The Flow"	Sara Niemietz	2:45
6.	"Find A Dream"	Sara Niemietz, W.G. Snuffy Walden	4:08

== See also ==
- Sara Niemietz discography
