= Michele Pawk =

American actress, singer

- Education: University of Cincinnati (BFA)
- Occupations: Actress, singer
- Spouse: John Dossett (m. 2004)
- Children: 1
- Awards: Tony Award for Best Performance by a Featured Actress in a Play; 2003 Hollywood Arms; Lucille Lortel Award for Outstanding Featured Actress in a Play; 2020 Heroes of the Fourth Turning

Michele Pawk is an American actress and singer. She is also an associate theater professor. She is a Tony Award and Lucille Lortel Award winner, and a Grammy Award nominee.

== Biography ==
Pawk attended the College Conservatory of Music in Cincinnati, where she received her BFA in musical theater. After graduation, she spent a year working in a musical revue at Disney World. In 1988, she made her Broadway debut in a short-lived musical entitled Mail, but it wasn't until 1992 that she made her mark with her performance in the Ira and George Gershwin-inspired production Crazy for You, for which she was nominated for a Drama Desk Award as Outstanding Featured Actress in a Musical. From there she went on to three successful revivals – Merrily We Roll Along (1994), Chicago (1996), and Cabaret (1998) – and an original musical, Seussical (2000), based on the works of Dr. Seuss.

In 2002, Pawk earned critical raves for her performance in Hollywood Arms, the Carrie Hamilton–Carol Burnett play adapted from Burnett's memoir, One More Time. Her portrayal of an alcoholic who dreams of success as a movie magazine writer, a character based on Burnett's mother, won her the Tony Award as Best Featured Actress in a Play. She was featured in Hairspray as Velma Von Tussle, after appearing in Mamma Mia! as "Donna" (October 19, 2005 – February 20, 2006).

Pawk's television credits include L.A. Law, The Golden Girls, and all three editions of the Law & Order franchise. She appeared in small roles in the films Jeffrey (1995) and Cradle Will Rock (1999). She also guest starred on an episode of Quantum Leap (1990) and Law & Order: Special Victims Unit (2020).

Pawk was featured alongside Victoria Clark and Jonathan Groff in the New York premiere of "Prayer for My Enemy" by Craig Lucas at the Playwrights Horizons Theater. The play touches on several topics including the Iraq War (Groff plays a young veteran), homosexuality, alcoholism, and the definition of family. The play ran from November 14, 2008, through December 21, 2008. In December 2022, Pawk took over the role of Madame Morrible in the Broadway production of Wicked. She played her final performance on March 3, 2024. Beginning in April 2025, Pawk was featured alongside Jonathan Groff again when she opened in Just in Time as Bobby Darin's "mother", Polly. She received a Grammy nomination for Best Musical Theater Album for the show's cast album.

=== Teaching ===
Pawk has been a full-time faculty member at Wagner College, Staten Island, New York, since 2010, teaching advanced acting, directing and film studies.

== Personal life ==
She is married to actor John Dossett. They have a son, Jack, born in February 2000.

Two of Michele's uncles, Johnny Pawk and Steve Pawk, were early professional basketball players in the 1930s.

== Stage credits ==
Year	Title	Role	Venue	Ref.
1988	Mail	Candi Suwinski	Broadway, Music Box Theatre	
1992	Crazy for You	Irene Roth	Broadway, Shubert Theatre	
1994	Merrily We Roll Along	Gussie	Off-Broadway, York Theatre Company	
1996	Chicago	Matron "Mama" Morton	Broadway, Richard Rodgers Theatre	
1997	Triumph of Love	Hesione (Replacement)	Broadway, Royale Theatre	
1998	Cabaret	Fraulein Kost	Broadway, Kit Kat Club	
2000	Seussical	Mayzie LaBird	Broadway, Richard Rodgers Theatre	
2001	Mamma Mia!	Donna Sheridan (Replacement)	Broadway, Winter Garden Theatre	
2002	Hollywood Arms	Louise	Broadway, Cort Theatre	
2004	Democracy	Woman's Voice	Broadway, Brooks Atkinson Theatre	
2005	Children and Art	Performer	Broadway, New Amsterdam Theatre	
2006	Losing Louie	Sheila Ellis	Broadway, Biltmore Theatre	
2007	Hairspray	Velma Von Tussle (Replacement)	Broadway, Neil Simon Theatre	
2019	Beautiful: The Carole King Musical	Genie Klein	Broadway, Stephen Sondheim Theatre	
2022	Wicked	Madame Morrible	Broadway, Gershwin Theatre	
2025	Just in Time	Polly Walden	Broadway, Circle in the Square Theatre	

== Awards and nominations ==
Year	Award	Category	Work	Result	Ref.
1992	Drama Desk Award	Outstanding Featured Actress in a Musical	Crazy for You	Nominated	
1998	Drama Desk Award	Outstanding Featured Actress in a Musical	Cabaret	Nominated	
1998	Outer Critics Circle Award	Outstanding Featured Actress in a Musical	Cabaret	Nominated	
2003	Tony Award	Best Featured Actress in a Play	Hollywood Arms	Won	
2006	Drama Desk Award	Outstanding Featured Actress in a Play	The Paris Letter	Nominated	
2011	Drama Desk Award	Outstanding Actress in a Play	A Small Fire	Nominated	
2020	Lucille Lortel Award	Outstanding Featured Actress in a Play	Heroes of the Fourth Turning	Won	
2025	Outer Critics Circle Award	Outstanding Featured Actress in a Musical	Just in Time	Nominated	
2026	Grammy Award	Best Musical Theater Album	Just in Time	Nominated	
