= Neville Chesters =

Music manager (1945–2023)

Neville Chesters (25 June 1945 – 27 April 2023) was a rock music manager and road manager who had worked with The Jimi Hendrix Experience, The Who, Cream, Emerson, Lake & Palmer, Bee Gees, The Merseybeats, Stray Dog and numerous other bands.

== Early years ==
Neville Chesters was born in Keighley, Yorkshire, England on 25 June 1945.

He initially studied animal husbandry at Askham Bryan College, ultimately completing Stage 1 and Stage 2 degrees in that field.

== 1960s ==
Moving to Liverpool in 1963, he became road manager for The Merseybeats from 1963 through 1964.

After relocating to London in 1964, he then became road manager for The Who between 1965 and 1966.

In 1967, he was assistant to Robert Stigwood which involved working for the bands Cream and The Bee Gees.

Later on, he also worked for Brian Epstein at NEMS Enterprises, which involved various projects with The Beatles and other NEMS artists (Sunday Night At The Saville Theatre).

From 1967 to 1968, he worked as the road manager for The Jimi Hendrix Experience, touring extensively and internationally with the band.

During this time, Neville shared a flat with Jimi Hendrix's bass player Noel Redding and with Lemmy Kilmister of Hawkwind and Motörhead fame. Additionally, Neville secured a position for Lemmy as a roadie with the Hendrix band.

From 1968 to 1969, he worked as assistant A&R to Peter Asher at Apple Records.

Taking a break from the entertainment field, Neville bought a farm in Cornwall, living and farming there peacefully for the next two years.

== 1970s ==
Chesters moved back to London in 1972 and re-entered the rock business, resuming road manager duties; this time working for Greg Lake of Emerson, Lake and Palmer.

In Denver, he met a band (then called Aphrodite) and took them back to England, successfully procuring a record deal for them with E.L.P. Manticore Records as the band Stray Dog which featured band members W.G. Snuffy Walden, Alan Roberts and Les Sampson. He toured with them until 1974.

He went on to work for Electro-Sound, a full-service staging/sound equipment/ P.A./ lighting and touring production company

In 1975, he moved to Woburn, Bedfordshire and started a successful antiques renovation company known as Yesterdays Pine, specialising in antique and reproduction pine furniture and "collectabillia".

== 1990s ==
Neville moved to New York City in 1990, and started a film and video company located at his own residence, otherwise known as "The Loft".

== 2000s ==
Battling health issues, Neville returned to the UK in 2013, retiring comfortably in Stony Stratford, Buckinghamshire and continued to roadie occasionally for local bands and artists.

In 2018, Neville was featured in an extensive autobiographical and delightfully anecdotal taped interview with Ashley West of The Rialto Report, documenting his fascinating journey into the world of the adult film industry as a producer and director under the pseudonym "Neville Chambers".

Chesters continued to be the subject of interviews and documentaries concerning his years working for The Jimi Hendrix Experience and other legendary bands.

== Death ==
On 27 April 2023, Chesters died in hospital due to heart failure at the age of 77.
