= Stray Dog (band) =

American blues rock group

- Also known as: Aphrodite
- Origin: Texas, United States
- Genres: Blues rock
- Years active: 1973–1975
- Labels: Apple; Manticore
- Past members: W. G. Snuffy Walden; Leslie Sampson; Alan Roberts; Tim Dulaine; Luis Cabaza; Randy Reader

Stray Dog were an American blues-based hard rock band formed in Texas, United States, in 1973. They recorded two albums before disbanding in 1975.

== Career ==
The band originally formed in Texas under the name "Aphrodite". They moved to Denver, Colorado, where they became popular. They were introduced to Neville Chesters, a former road manager for Emerson, Lake & Palmer, who convinced the band to go to London where, along with a friend and a former tour manager Lorenzio Mazzio, he introduced Snuffy Walden to Greg Lake, who signed them to ELP's label, Manticore Records. Randy Reeder was replaced by Leslie Sampson. Lake produced three tracks on the 1973 debut self-titled album, Stray Dog, with the band producing the remainder.

In March 1973, the British music magazine, NME, reported that Stray Dog were to support ELP on their world tour, which was due to commence in Germany at the end of that month.

Stray Dog's follow-up album, While You're Down There (1974), was co-produced by Austin Godsey and the band, which featured new members Tim Dulaine on second guitar and vocals, and keyboardist Luis Cabaza. The additions of Dulaine and Cabaza radically changed the band's sound from blues-based power trio to a more subdued and commercial AOR rock sound. Much of the material on While You're Down There was written and sung by Dulaine, with founder Walden's contributions being reduced. Only two tracks, "I Would" and the instrumental "Worldwinds", retained a sound and stylistic approach reminiscent of their debut.

Sampson had played previously in another power trio, Road, with Noel Redding, and American guitarist Rod Richards. They produced one self-titled 1972 album on the Rare Earth label. After the demise of Stray Dog, Walden went on to write and produce the theme songs for several popular American television programs, most notably thirtysomething and The West Wing.

== Personnel ==
- W. G. Snuffy Walden - guitar, lead vocals
- Alan Roberts - bass, keyboards, vocals
- Leslie Sampson - drums, percussion
- Tim Dulaine - guitars, lead vocals
- Luis Cabaza - keyboards, vocals
- Randy Reeder - drums, vocals

Guest appearances

- John "Rabbit" Bundrick - organ, piano
- Mel Collins - flute

== Discography ==
- Stray Dog (1973)
- While You're Down There (1974)
- Fasten Your Seat Belts (1993)
- Live from the Whiskey a Go-Go (March 15, 1975) (2010)
