= Steve Pawk =

American basketball player

Personal information
- Born: August 14, 1914 Butler, Pennsylvania, U.S.
- Died: March 4, 2009 (aged 94) Farrell, Pennsylvania, U.S.
- Listed height: 6 ft 4 in (1.93 m)
- Listed weight: 175 lb (79 kg)
- Position: Power forward / center

Career history
- 1933–1936: Butler Penn Drakes
- 1937–1938: Warren Penns

Steven L. Pawk (August 14, 1914 – March 4, 2009) was an American professional basketball player. He played for the Warren Penns in the National Basketball League and averaged 3.5 points per game. His older brother was Johnny Pawk, who also played professional basketball.

He was the uncle of Tony Award-winning singer and actress Michele Pawk.
