= Johnny Pawk =

American basketball player

Personal information
- Born: December 23, 1910 Butler, Pennsylvania, U.S.
- Died: December 28, 2004 (aged 94) West Chester, Pennsylvania, U.S.
- Listed height: 6 ft 2 in (1.88 m)
- Listed weight: 210 lb (95 kg)

Career information
- College: Westminster (PA)
- Playing career: 1932–1939
- Position: Forward

Career history
- 1932–1936: Butler Penn Drakes
- 1937–1938: Warren HyVis Oil
- 1936–1937: Hilgemeier Packers
- 1937–1938: Warren Penns
- 1938–1939: Warren Penns / Cleveland White Horses

John A. Pawk (December 23, 1910 – December 28, 2004) was an American professional basketball player. He played for the Warren Penns and Cleveland White Horses in the National Basketball League and averaged 4.1 points per game. His younger brother was Steve Pawk, who also played professional basketball.

In his post-basketball career, Pawk worked at the Lyndora Hotel for 40 years. He was also the uncle of Tony Award-winning singer and actress Michele Pawk.
