= Sara Niemietz =

American singer-songwriter and actress

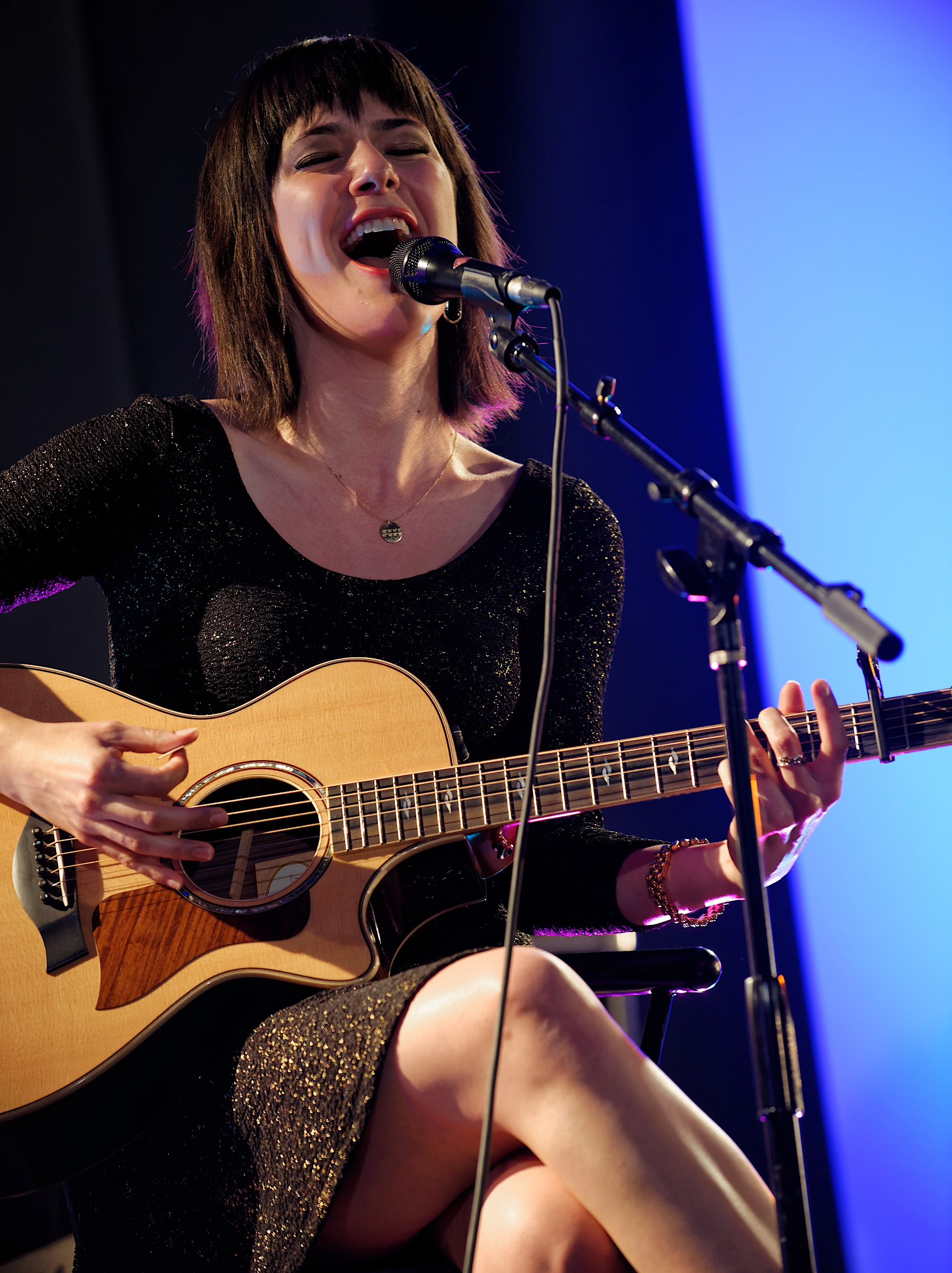
- Sara Niemietz performing in June 2016

Background information
- Born: Sara Anne Niemietz; June 7, 1992 (age 34); Chicago, Illinois, U.S.
- Origin: Los Angeles, California, U.S.
- Genres: Pop; rock; jazz pop
- Occupations: Singer, songwriter, actress
- Instruments: Vocals; guitar
- Years active: 2000–present
- Website: SaraNiemietz.com

Sara Anne Niemietz (/ˈsærə ˈnɪmɪts/; born June 7, 1992) is an American singer-songwriter and actress based in Los Angeles, California. She has performed on Broadway, at Radio City Music Hall, and on the Grand Ole Opry. A substantial portion of her YouTube offerings are live performance music-videos and her channel has surpassed 25 million views. Her regular co-writer and long-time accompanist is W. G. Snuffy Walden, and she has also co-written with Melissa Manchester. Niemietz is a regular cast-member with Postmodern Jukebox, appearing on a dozen albums, a PBS television special, and an MTV music video. She is a featured artist on Richard Marx's A Night Out with Friends (2012) (PBS), Christmas Spirit (2012), and B. J. Thomas's The Living Room Sessions (2013).

== Early life and education ==
Niemietz first appeared on stage at age 4, when BJ Thomas helped her onto the stage. In the recording, Thomas appears delighted that the youngster is completely at ease with singing "Hooked on a Feeling" in front of an audience. Following her brief time on stage, Thomas can be heard to say, "I can't believe she knows the words!" and repeats an inaudible comment from the audience, "...she knows all my songs?" Reunited in 2012, Niemietz and Thomas recorded "Hooked on a Feeling" for Thomas' The Living Room Sessions (2013) album.

Delivering Chicago and Broadway theater performances, beginning at age 9, Niemietz continued her career in California with television roles, film roles, soundtrack productions, music videos and CDs. Niemietz played young Helen in Hollywood Arms (2002), the Broadway presentation of Carol Burnett's memoirs. She played Polly in the feature film Akeelah and the Bee (2006), and Niemietz played a starring role of Patrice in the world premier of Jason Robert Brown's musical, 13 at the Mark Taper Forum in 2007. Niemietz is the vocalist on the soundtrack for The Exorcism of Emily Rose (2005) and she is also the guitarist on the 2010 season of the television series, Glee.

Niemietz graduated from Saugus High School in 2010, maintained an "A" level GPA, was active in the school's theatre department and played Luisa in Saugus High School's production of The Fantasticks during her senior year. She is also a graduate of the Barbizon School of Acting and Modeling (Chicago).

== Career ==
With high school behind her, Niemietz teamed with Emmy Award winner, W. G. Snuffy Walden, and Taylor Made Studios for her latest EP offerings, Push Play and Christmas Favorites. The team have produced dozens of music videos, covering contemporary hits and original compilations. Niemietz's cover of Adele's "Rolling in the Deep" brought 7 million views after her YouTube presentations caught the attention of Ellen DeGeneres. Niemietz appeared as a featured artist on the Ellen DeGeneres Show in May 2011, and, in January 2012, she charted #14 on Billboard magazine's Next Big Sound.

On June 10, 2012, Niemietz was again invited to share the stage with five-time Grammy Award-winning B. J. Thomas, some fifteen years after their initial impromptu performance. Niemietz is featured on Thomas' 2013 album, The Living Room Sessions, with Niemietz and Thomas performing a duet of his 1968 Top 10 hit, "Hooked on a Feeling".

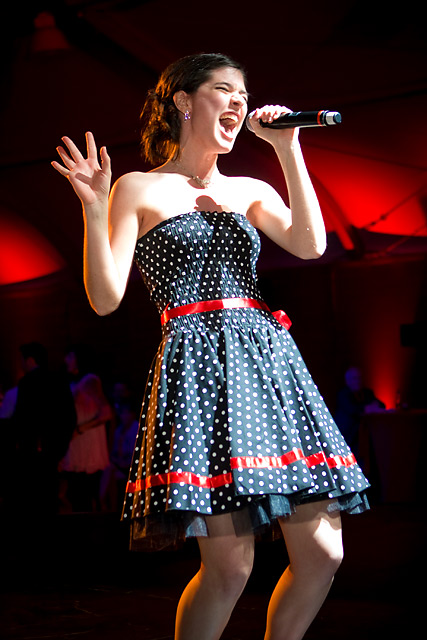
Life Through Arts Foundation, "Red Party" (2010)

Niemietz is also featured in duet with Richard Marx on his 2012 album and PBS live television special, A Night Out With Friends, singing Marx's number one adult contemporary hit, "Keep Coming Back". Marx again called on Niemietz to perform "Santa Claus is Coming to Town", a duet, for his first Christmas album, Christmas Spirit.

Niemietz and Walden co-wrote the song "Set You Free" for Phil Scarpaci's 2011 film, In The Key of Eli. Niemietz and Walden also wrote the song "Never Too Far From Home" which Niemietz performs in Stetson, Street Dog of Park City, a 2012 short film promoting the adoption of abandoned pets.

On June 28, 2013, shortly after her twenty-first birthday, Niemietz took the stage with B. J. Thomas to perform "Hooked on a Feeling" at the Grand Ole Opry. On May 31, 2014, Niemietz performed with Mary Ann Mobley at the tenth annual What A Pair! benefit for cancer research, at the Saban Theater, in Beverly Hills.

Melissa Manchester and Niemietz (BMI) co-wrote the song "Feeling For You" for Manchester's album, You Gotta Love the Life (2015), with Keb' Mo' producing the song and playing guitar on the track. "Feelin' for You" was pre-released as a single on January 9, 2015, and premiered at #2 on the smooth jazz charts. You Gotta Love the Life was released on February 10, 2015, and hit #17 on the Billboard Magazine Jazz Albums chart for the week of February 28, 2015.

Niemietz appears on the closing track of Scott Bradlee's Postmodern Jukebox, Swipe Right For Vintage, released on July 30, 2015. Rearranged by Bradlee, Talking Heads', "This Must Be the Place (Naive Melody)" (1983) is transformed into a swing piece featuring the horns of Lemar Guillary and Danny Janklow. An accompanying music video was released on August 20, 2015. September continued to be a busy time for Niemietz in 2015. She performed at the Governor's Ball after-party for the Emmy Awards on September 20, rushing back to Los Angeles after performing at the ninetieth birthday-bash for Gerald Hines at the University of Houston on the previous evening.

PostModern Jukebox/Scott Bradlee 2015 cover version of Outkast, "Hey Ya!" (2003).
Feat. Sara Niemietz

Postmodern Jukebox released a second collaborative video featuring Niemietz, singing Scott Bradlee's rendition of "Hey Ya!" (2003) by Outkast, with Matt Bloyd and Kenton Chen backing Niemietz on vocals. Niemietz released her new EP, Fountain & Vine, on September 22, with her song "Taxi Outside" as the first video single. Niemietz spoke with Next Big Thing Radio about these activities on September 21.

In November 2015, Niemietz joined the U.S. Northeastern leg of the Postmodern Jukebox tour, culminating the season at the Microsoft Theater in Los Angeles on December 11, 2015. Time magazine reported on Niemietz' third music video with Postmodern Jukebox, a Dixieland arrangement of Justin Bieber's "Love Yourself" (2015),

On March 26, 2016, Niemietz performed as a featured vocalist with PostModern Jukebox at the Dubai Jazz Festival. Niemietz performed throughout the 75 show European Union tour, culminating in Istanbul, Turkey on June 3. In August 2016, she released another video with Postmodern Jukebox, "I Will Survive".

=== Theater ===
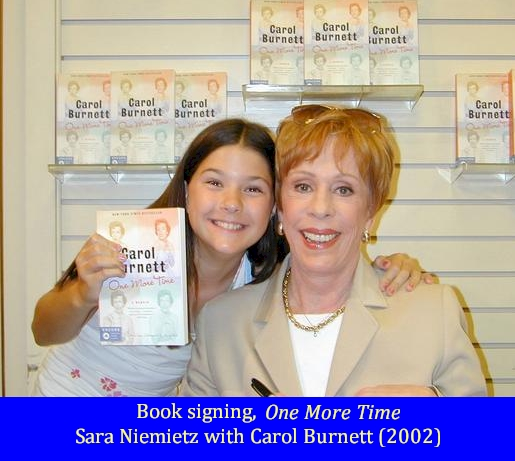
Niemietz (left) played the part of Carol Burnett (right) in Burnett's memoir, Hollywood Arms.

Sara Niemietz's professional stage career began on April 19, 2002, at the Goodman Theater in Chicago, when she played the character of young Carol Burnett (Young Helen) in the pre-Broadway production of Hollywood Arms. Niemietz played the younger (1941 era) Helen in the first act, with Donna Lynne Champlin playing (1951 era) Helen in the second act. Following the Chicago run, she played 76 performances on Broadway at age 10.

While in New York, Niemietz also played the lead character in Pamela's First Musical at the Lincoln Center for the Performing Arts; adapted from the children's book, written by Wendy Wasserstein, music was written by Cy Coleman and lyrics provided by David Zippel.

In Los Angeles, in 2007, Niemietz played the role of Patrice in the Los Angeles premiere of the Jason Robert Brown and Dan Elish musical, 13. Director Todd Graff described Niemietz as the "rock" of the cast and one of four incumbent actors from the workshop production to earn roles in the premiere. The Los Angeles production of 13, with an all teenage cast and band, received a nomination for the 2007 LA Stage Alliance Ovation Awards, World Premiere Musical

Niemietz was chosen to play the role of Wanda in Enter Laughing, The Musical, a one night only performance (January 28, 2013), honoring Carl Reiner's seventy-fifth year in the entertainment industry.

In 2015, Niemietz was again cast as Wanda in Carl Reiner's musical, Enter Laughing, this time at the Wallis Annenberg Theater in Beverly Hills, CA.

=== Soundtrack ===
Niemietz performs "Never Too Far From Home" in Stetson, Street Dog of Park City.

Sara Niemietz is the credited vocalist for The Exorcism of Emily Rose (2005). Niemietz worked with film composer Christopher Young on The Exorcism of Emily Rose and provided vocals again on Young's compositions for The Uninvited (2008).

Her soundtrack appearances include:

- Polly Pocket: Lunar Eclipse
- Polly Pocket: 2 Cool at the Pocket Plaza
- Barbie as the Princess and the Pauper
- The Exorcism of Emily Rose
- PollyWorld
- Teen Witch the Musical
- Moondance Alexander
- The Uninvited
- Mickey Matson and the Copperhead Conspiracy
- In the Key of Eli
- Stetson, Street Dog of Park City

=== Discography ===
Niemietz has performed on six soundtracks and is a featured guest on Richard Marx, B. J. Thomas, Postmodern Jukebox albums and videos. Niemietz is primarily accompanied by W.G. Snuffy Walden, with various studio musicians appearing on her albums such as: George Doering, Randy Kerber, Bennett Salvay, Andrew Shulman and Herman Matthews.

=== Filmography ===
Niemietz's film appearances include the supporting role of Polly in Akeelah and the Bee.

In 2003, Niemietz played the part of Mona in the short film, Home, which was written and directed by Nancy Deren.

Television roles
Year	Series	Character	Episodes
2002	Providence	Shania Seacrest	Season 4, Episode 16
2002	First Monday	Young Ellie	Unknown
2005	Gilmore Girls	Fiddler Chorus	Season 5, Episode 15
2010	Glee	Musician (on screen guitarist)	Season 2, 8 episodes

=== Other television appearances ===
On September 15, 2002, Niemietz and Donna Lynne Champlin performed the song "I'm Always Chasing Rainbows" before an estimated audience of fifty thousand in Times Square at the eleventh annual Broadway on Broadway event. Niemietz and Champlin also performed "I'm Always Chasing Rainbows" on ABC's The View in 2002.

On May 4, 2011, Niemietz made a featured artist appearance on The Ellen DeGeneres Show. In July 2011, Niemietz was interviewed on SVCtv's House Blend, where she premiered her song "Dangerous Outside".

On May 31, 2012, on episode 109 of Front Row Center featuring Richard Marx' A Night Out With Friends. Marx and Niemietz performed the song "Keep Coming Back".

On September 15, 2014, Niemietz' rendition of The Byrds', "Turn! Turn! Turn!", was used for the closing scene of Under the Dome (CBS) season two, episode twelve. For 2015, Niemietz' cover of Etta James' "At Last" was chosen for the eight-week prime-time television promotion for Scandal's (ABC) fifth season.

On March 11, 2016, Niemietz covered a big band version of Elle King's "Ex's & Oh's" with tap dancer Sarah Reich on MTV UK.
