= Herman Matthews =

American drummer and composer

Herman L. Matthews
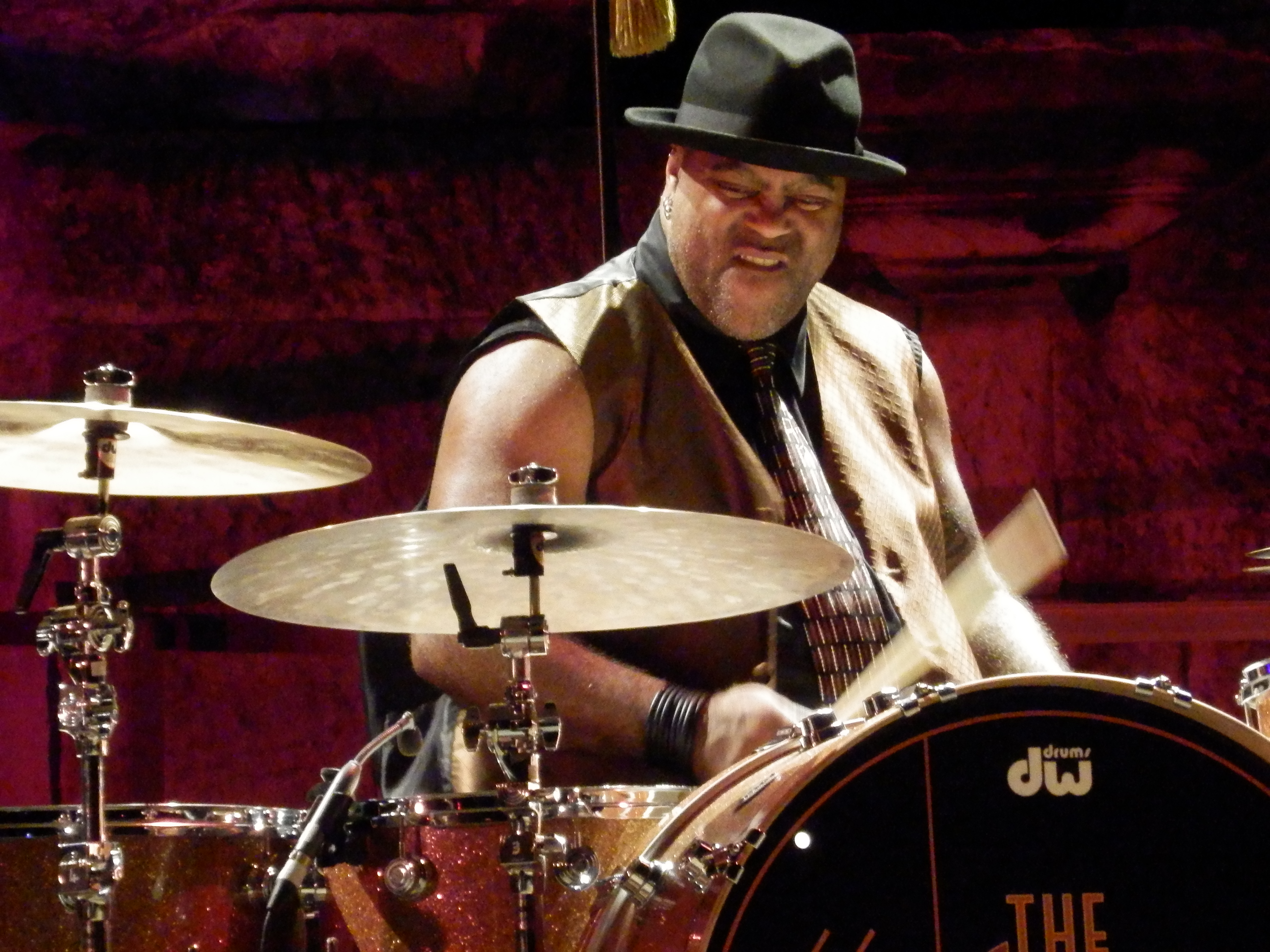
- Mathews with Hugh Laurie and the Copper Bottom Band (2013)

Background information
- Born: December 28, 1960 (age 65); Houston, Texas
- Genres: Rock, blues, jazz, R&B, funk
- Occupations: Musician, Drummer, Percussionist
- Instruments: Drums, Percussion
- Website: hermanmatthews.com

Herman Matthews (born December 28, 1960) is an American drummer and composer. Matthews works as a session and touring musician, most notably for Tower of Power, Kenny Loggins and toured with Tom Jones for more than 7 years. He began playing drums at the age of seven and has been the backbone of world-class pop, rock, jazz, soul, R&B and funk bands for nearly thirty years.

== Career ==
Matthews has worked with such artists as Stevie Wonder, Celine Dion, Elton John, Sheryl Crow, Herbie Hancock, Carole King, John Mayall, Spencer Davis, Edgar Winter, Luther Vandross, Rebekah, Bob James, Bobby Kimball, KINA, George Duke, Kirk Whalum, Eric Burdon & The Animals, David Foster, Michael McDonald, Michael Bolton, Patti Austin, Teresa James & the Rhythm Tramps, Robin Thicke, Angela Winbush, The Isley Brothers, Bonnie Raitt, Taj Mahal and Richard Marx. Matthews's work appears on movie and television soundtracks, he was a house-band member for the hit television show, In Living Color.

Matthews released his first solo CD Home At Last in 2007. The title track was featured in an episode of the Fox Broadcasting Company crime/drama K-VILLE starring Anthony Anderson and Cole Hauser.

Matthews replaced drummer, Jay Bellerose, for the Hugh Laurie 2013–2014 World Tour. Matthews's first gig with the Copper Bottom Band was for the PBS, "Live On The Queen Mary", broadcast on August 3, 2013. Laurie's 2013 album, Didn't It Rain, peaked Billboard Magazine's, Billboard 200 at #21 and was #1 on Billboard's Top Blues Albums.

== Solo albums ==
=== Home At Last (2007) ===
Sample track: "Hold on You"
Herman Matthews: Home at Last (2007)

Sample track: "Cup of Sugar"
Herman Matthews: Home at Last (2007)

Home At Last

- Released: 2007
- Format: "LP/CD"
- Label: Doc Huck-a-Buck Records
- Producer: Ned Albright & Herman Matthews

| No. | Title | Writer(s) | Length |
|---|---|---|---|
| 1. | "I Don't Want to Go Home" | H. Matthews/N. Albright | 5:45 |
| 2. | "Hold on You" | H. Matthews | 4:43 |
| 3. | "Cup of Sugar" | H. Matthews/N. Albright | 3:05 |
| 4. | "We Are Heaven" | H. Matthews/N. Albright | 3:48 |
| 5. | "I am a Drummer From Texas" | H. Matthews | 3:42 |
| 6. | "Not Another Lover" | H. Matthews/N. Albright | 3:24 |
| 7. | "Junk in the Trunk" | H. Matthews | 4:03 |
| 8. | "I've Got a Home" | H. Matthews/P. Settle | 3:56 |
| 9. | "Chop That BBQ" | H. Matthews | 1:00 |
| 10. | "Home at Last" | H. Matthews | 3:23 |
| 11. | "Function at the Junction" | Eddie Holland & Shorty Long | 4:32 |

- Recorded at: Ned's Studio in Los Angeles
- Mastering by: Simon Rhodes at Abbey Road Studios
- Dedicated to: Clifton "Red" Matthews and
  Herman Leslie Matthews Jr.

Primary vocalists

- Herman Matthews -Vocals primary
- Teresa James - Vocal Ad-Libs, Vocal Harmony
- Kim Yarbrough - Vocal Ad-Libs

The Hermanators

- Ned Albright - Vocals (Background)
- Gia Ciambotti - Vocals (Background)
- Ben Jaffe - Vocals (Background)
- Kim Yarbrough - Vocals (Background)

Composers

- Ned Albright
- Eddie Holland
- Shorty Long
- Herman Matthews
- Phil Settle

Production

- Ned Albright - Producer
- Bob-A-Lew Songs - Administration (ASCAP)
- Gardner Knight - Engineer and mixing
- Orit Harpaz - Photography
- Herman Matthews - Producer
- Todd Miller - Engineer ("Cup Of Sugar")
- Christy Myhre - Design
- Simon Rhodes - Mastering

Musicians

- Troy "Trombone Shorty" Andrews - trombone
- Ned Albright - foot and hand percussion, organ, piano, wurlitzer
- André Berry - bass, guitar
- Karen Briggs - violin
- Dr. John Ciambotti - bass
- Charley Drayton - bass
- Everette Harp - saxophone
- Jeffrey Hills - tuba
- Larry Kimpel - bass
- Gardner Knight - foot stomping, handclapping
- James Martin - saxophone
- Herman Matthews - drums, hand, foot and mouth percussion, spoken word
- Brian Monroney - banjo
- Ivan Neville - organ
- Dean Parks - clarinet, guitar, guitar (acoustic), pedal-steel
- Doug Pettibone - dobro, guitar, soloist
- Kevin Ricard - percussion, tambourine
- Lee Sklar - bass
- Lee Thornburg - trumpet
- David Woodford - saxophone

== Discography ==
=== Recording ===
Herman Matthews recordings
| Year | Title | Primary Artist | Instrument(s) |
|---|---|---|---|
| 1989 | The Flipside: Jazz Horn Solos | Tom Bacon | Drums |
| 1989 | The Promise | Kirk Whalum | Drums |
| 1991 | Leap of Faith | Kenny Loggins | Drums, percussion, Talking Drum |
| 1992 | Second Wind | Dwight Sills | Drums |
| 1993 | Outside: From the Redwoods | Kenny Loggins | Choir/Chorus, Drums |
| 1993 | Passion | Alexander Zonjic | Drums |
| 1993 | Put on Your Green Shoes | Various artists (Kenny Loggins) | Drums ("If you Believe") |
| 1993 | Live! | The Isley Brothers | Drums |
| 1994 | Angela Winbush | Angela Winbush | Drum Overdubs, Drums, Drums (Snare), Overdubs, Toms, Tom-Tom |
| 1995 | Souled Out | Tower of Power | Drums, Group Member, Percussion |
| 1995 | Tapestry Revisited: A Tribute to Carole King | Various artists (Richard Marx) | Drums ("Beautiful") |
| 1995 | Illusions | George Duke | Drums ("Money") |
| 1996 | Premiere Consultation | Doc Gyneco | Hi Hat |
| 1996 | Sax for Lovers [Sony] | Various artists | Drums |
| 1997 | Flesh & Bone | Richard Marx | Drums |
| 1997 | Rhythm & Business | Tower of Power | Composer, drums, percussion |
| 1998 | Phil Settle & Friends - Santa Monica Pier | Phil Settle | Drums |
| 1999 | Everybody on the Bus | Francis "Rocco" Prestia | Composer, drums |
| 1999 | Push the River | Lauren Ellis | Drums |
| 1999 | Soul Vaccination: Live | Tower of Power | Composer |
| 1999 | Urban Dreams | Urban Jazz Network | Drums |
| 1999 | What Is Hip?: The Tower of Power Anthology | Tower of Power | Composer, drums |
| 2000 | Days in Avalon [Signal 21] | Richard Marx | Drums |
| 2000 | The Color of Silence | Tiffany | Drums |
| 2002 | Christi Baeuerle | Christi Baeuerle | Drums, Loops |
| 2002 | Miles to Go | Alex Bach | Beat Box, Drums |
| 2002 | Soul with a Capital "S": The Best of Tower of Power | Tower of Power | Composer, drums, percussion |
| 2002 | The Best of Kirk Whalum | Kirk Whalum | Drums |
| 2002 | The Essential Kenny Loggins | Kenny Loggins | Drums, Main Personnel, Vocals, Voices |
| 2003 | 12 Arrows | Judith Owen | Drums |
| 2003 | A Beautiful World | Robin Thicke | Drums |
| 2003 | It's About Time | Kenny Loggins | Drums, Vocal Percussion |
| 2003 | Presents 21 Days | Wayman Tisdale | Drums |
| 2003 | The Oakland Zone | Tower of Power | Composer |
| 2003 | The Whole Enchilada | Teresa James | Drums |
| 2005 | John Farnham & Tom Jones – Together in Concert | Tom Jones | Drums |
| 2007 | Home At Last | Herman Matthews | Primary Artist, Composer, Producer, Percussion, Spoken Word, Vocals, Vocals (Background) |
| 2007 | Just Me | Tiffany | Drums |
| 2007 | Outta Nowhere | Tim Myers | Drums |
| 2007 | Right as Rain | Gia Ciambotti | Drums, Main Personnel |
| 2007 | Sleep City | Vicki Randle | Drums |
| 2007 | The Bottom Line | Teresa James & the Rhythm Tramps | Drums, Member of Attributed Artist |
| 2007 | Ultimate Kirk Whalum | Kirk Whalum | Drums |
| 2009 | Even Things Up | Pete Anderson | Drums |
| 2010 | 40th Anniversary | Tower of Power | Drums |
| 2010 | Joey Sykes | Joey Sykes | Drums |
| 2011 | Mercy Bound | Edwin McCain | Drums |
| 2011 | Stories To Tell | Richard Marx | Drums |
| 2012 | Bang Bang Boom Boom | Beth Hart | Drums |
| 2012 | Elvis Found Alive | Jon Burrows | Drums |
| 2012 | Live from Dixie's Bar & Bus Stop | Jerry Jeff Walker | Camera Operator, Producer |
| 2012 | Come on Home | Teresa James & the Rhythm Tramps | Composer, drums |
| 2012 | Push Play | Sara Niemietz | Drums |
| 2012 | East Bay Soul, Vol. 2 | Greg Adams | Composer |

=== Tour ===
Herman Matthews tours
| Year | Artist | Tour |
|---|---|---|
| 1988-89 | Kirk Whalum | "And You Know That” & "The Promise" Tours |
| 1989-91 | Bob James | "Ivory Coast" & "Grand piano Canyon" World Tours |
| 1990 | Stevie Wonder | "Nelson Mandela" Tour |
| 1990-92 | Isley Bros. & Angela Winbush | "World Tour" |
| 1991-92 | Kenny Loggins | "Leap Of Faith" Tour |
| 1992-93 | Expose | "Would Tour" |
| 1993 | Kirk Whalum | "Cache" (Opening for Whitney Houston) |
| 1993 | The Winans (Angie & Debbie) | "Whitney Houston Tour" |
| 1993 | Kenny Loggins | "Spot Dates" |
| 1994 | Richard Marx | "Paid Vacation" World Tour |
| 1995 | Tower Of Power | 1996 "Souled Out" World Tour |
| 1996 | Adriana Evans | "Promo Tour" |
| 1997 | Tower Of Power | "Rhythm & Business" World Tour |
| 1998 | Rebekah | "Lilith Fair" (Drummer & Musical Director) |
| 1998 | Rebekah | "Remember To Breathe" World Tour |
| 1998 | Rebekah | Opener for Third Eye Blind & Match Box 20 |
| 1999 | Kenny Loggins | "Tour & Spot Dates” |
| 1999 | Meredith Brooks | "Promo Tour” |
| 1999 | Judith Owen | "Promo Tour” |
| 1999 | Fisher | "Promo Tour” |
| 1999 | Richard Marx | "China” |
| 2000 | Kina | opening act for "Savage Garden” |
| 2000 | Kina | (DreamWorks) |
| 2000 | Kenny Loggins | "Spot Dates” |
| 2001 | Kenny Loggins | "Tour & Spot Dates" |
| 2002 | Tom Jones | "Atlantic City" |
| 2003 | Tom Jones | "European World Tour" |
| 2004 | Tom Jones | "John Farnham / Tom Jones Tour" |
| 2005 | Tom Jones | "Tom Jones / Tower Of Power Summer Tour" |
| 2006 | Tom Jones | "Tom Jones European World Tour" |
| 2006 | Tom Jones | "Tom Jones / Tower Of power Summer Tour" |
| 2007 | Tom Jones | "Tom Jones" |
| 2008 | Tom Jones | "Tom Jones" |
| 2009 | Tom Jones | "Tom JonesGlastonbury 2009" |
| 2009 | Timothy B. Schmit | "Expnado Tour" |
| 2010 | American Idol | "American Stars Motown tour 2010" |
| 2010-11 | Greg Adams | "East Bay Soul" |
| 2011 | David Jenkins | "Kuwait - Iraq" |
| 2011 | Bobby Kimball | "Kuwait - Iraq" |
| 2011 | Bill Champlin | "Japan" |
| 2013-14 | Hugh Laurie | "Hugh Laurie & The Copper Bottom Band" |
