= Most of All (song) =

Single by B. J. Thomas

from the album Most of All
- B-side: "The Mask"
- Released: November 1970
- Length: 2:52
- Label: Scepter Records SCE-12299
- Songwriter(s): Buddy Buie, J.R. Cobb
- Producer(s): Buddy Buie, Steve Tyrell

BJ Thomas Singles singles chronology
"I Just Can't Help Believing" (1970)	"Most of All" (1970)	"No Love at All" (1971)

"Most of All" is a B. J. Thomas single from the 1970 album, Most of All, on Scepter Records. The song, composed by Buddy Buie and J.R. Cobb (Classics IV, Atlanta Rhythm Section), reached #2 on the Billboard Adult Contemporary singles chart, and #38 on the Billboard Hot 100, in the same year. The song was also a hit in Canada, reaching the Top 20 on both corresponding charts.

== History ==
The song has been republished on many of Thomas' albums and greatest hits compilations, including a calypso arranged duo with Keb' Mo' on The Living Room Sessions (2013).

- B. J. Thomas has also recorded a different song with the same title, "Most of All" (1955), written by Alan Freed, Harvey Fuqua and Hank Thompson.

Year	Title	Single: "Most of All" (B. J. Thomas) Peak chart positions							Album
Year	Title	US AC	US	US Country	US Christian (CHR)	CAN AC	CAN	CAN Country	Album
1970	"Most of All"	2	38	—	—	13	20	—	Most of All

== Other versions ==
- The Osmonds released a version of the song on their 1970 album, Osmonds.

Anne Murray recorded it for her 1971 album "Talk It Over In The Morning".
