= Stetson, Street Dog of Park City =

- Film poster
- Directed by: Nancy Ogden
- Based on: Stetson, Street Dog of Park City by Jeanine Heil Illustrated by Kristina Skarstedt
- Produced by: Nancy Ogden
- Starring: Stetson; Silas Buehrig; Dr. John Artz; Mayor Dana Williams; Niki Dakota
- Narrated by: Lesley Ann Fogle
- Cinematography: Greg Bernstein
- Edited by: Nancy Odgen; Zack Gietek
- Music by: W. G. Snuffy Walden; Sara Niemietz
- Distributed by: Campbell and Co LLC
- Release date: 2012
- Running time: 22 minutes
- Country: United States
- Language: English

Stetson, Street Dog of Park City is a short film released in 2012 and adapted from the children's book written by Jeanine Heil. The storyline deals with the plight of homeless animals and the film is shown locally to encourage the adoption of abandoned animals. A portion of the film's proceeds are donated to Second Chance for Homeless Pets in Salt Lake City, Utah, which served as a halfway house for Stetson's permanent adoption.

A small terrier with aggressiveness issues, who had been rescued from the streets of Park City, was chosen to play the part of Stetson. The rescued dog (now named Stetson) had the good fortune of resembling Kristina Skarstedt's illustrations of Stetson included within the children's book.

== Plot ==
Because he is small, Stetson, a tan and brown terrier, has been abandoned in favor of a larger hunting dog. Stetson finds himself alone on the streets of the winter ski town, Park City, Utah, in search of food, shelter and a new home. Because he is small, Stetson can hide under the steps of Alex's Bistro, from between the steps, Stetson watches the sun set behind the Wasatch Mountains, the activities about the town and the dinner crowd leaving the bistro into the evening snowfall.

The next morning, Stetson is awoken by the sounds of skiers preparing to enjoy a fresh blanket of snow. Because he is small, Stetson has to avoid people and ski boots, walking the freshly shoveled paths through the snow. As Stetson trots down Main Street and past Dolly's Bookstore, the smell of freshly cooked bacon leads him to the Morning Ray Cafe. Stetson patiently waits outside, hoping that somebody will share their breakfast with him. Finally, a man in fire-red ski boots shares his croissant and pats Stetson on the head.

Behind the cafe, Stetson finds his friend Sam, a Golden Retriever, and then wanders over to his favorite snow cave; because he is small, the snow cave is just the right size. Stetson continues on to Love Your Pet Bakery, which is owned by three giant Newfoundland dogs, Ferguson, Apollo and Atlas. The lady at the counter gives Stetson a treat and he wanders upstairs, to an area where they sell custom dog collars. He sidles up to a customer, hoping that she needs a tan and brown terrier. Stetson tries on an orange collar, but none of the nice people give him collar or a home.

Stetson then rides the Park City Trolley, seated near his friend the Mayor (Mayor Dana Williams). Stetson and the Mayor like to ride the trolley because the people are nice, Stetson also likes to ride high in his seat to see the colorful and historic mining era buildings of Park City and so that he doesn't have to look at feet.

Stetson takes the Park City Trolley to Dolly's Bookstore, which looks warm and inviting, Stetson picks his moment to sneak inside. Two cats, Mr. Dolly and Che own Dolly's Bookstore and they don't appreciate his visit on this evening. Stetson tries to disguise himself, hiding in a pile of stuffed animals, but Mr. Dolly really does not want Stetson in his store today. Stetson finds another place to hide in a cowboy hat shaped cat bed. Because he is small, Stetson can just fit into the bed and he falls asleep. At children's story time, the bookstore gets busy and very noisy, Stetson heads into the evening looking for food and warmth. As the night grows colder, icicles form on the buildings and on Stetson's beard. Wandering up Main Street looking for food, Stetson meets a nice lady (Kristina Skarstedt) and a little girl, Stetson also meets a not so nice person (Vicky Bushnell), who chases him away.

Stetson is soon drawn to music coming from the open doors of St. Mary's Church. Stetson scoots into the church, and because he is small, he can crawl forward under the pews, settling beneath a man with a red scarf and a Stetson cowboy hat. At the end of the Service, Stetson follows the man with the hat into the blustery evening. A gust of wind whips the hat from the man's hand and it comes to rest beneath a parked snowplow. A snow-covered Stetson retrieves the hat and returns it to the man. The man picks up the hat and then he picks up Stetson, because he is small, the man is able to warm Stetson with the red scarf and carries him to his new home.

The man's name is John (Dr. John Artz), he is Ski Patrol in Park City. And now, Stetson will learn to be a ski Patrol dog. Because he is small, Stetson can ride in John's backpack as they travel the mountains helping to keep skiers and snowboarders safe.

== Cast ==
Video clip of Stetson in his new home. Stetson, Street Dog of Park City, is a short film adapted from the children's book written by Jeanine Heil.

- Stetson as Stetson
- Silas Beuhrig as the voice of Stetson
- Dr. John Artz DVM as John, ski patrol
- Mayor Dana Williams as the mayor
- Niki Dakota as the voice of the mom
- Lesley Ann Fogle as the narrator

== Themes ==
The protagonist (Stetson) is small in stature and this fact is promoted throughout the narrative with the sentence preposition, "Because he was small..." Anticipating that most children will empathize with the central character's small stature as a liability. Following the story's turning point, the narrative emphasizes that being small in stature can also be an asset.

Stetson, Street Dog of Park City brings the book to life with the use of illustrations and a narrative from the book. The film takes the viewer on a tour of the historic mining town of Park City, Utah with Lesley Ann Fogle narrating and with a young Silas Beuhrig as the voice of Stetson, the tan and brown terrier.

== Production ==
=== Development ===
As an adaption from the children's book, Stetson, Street Dog of Park City, the script's theme develops empathy for the abandoned dog by using the narrative, "because he was small". Children may self-identify with being small in stature as a liability, the story's happy ending notes that being small in stature can also be an asset.

Funding for Stetson, Street Dog of Park City was provided by the film's Producer, Nancy Ogden, in partnership with the Park City Foundation. Proceeds from the sale of Stetson, Street Dog of Park City also benefit The Park City Foundation and Second Chance for Homeless Pets.

=== Pre-production ===
Tonya Landon, of Diamonds in the Ruff Dog Services, was tasked with finding a dog that resembles the illustrations of Stetson in the book. After looking at hundreds of dogs, Landon found the terrier at the Second Chance for Homeless Pets and was informed that the dog was aggressive; the fact that this dog was found roaming the streets of Park City was a coincidence. Landon was optimistic that she could work with the dog and took him because he had the look. Landon describes the dog's aggressive traits as "severe issues," which were overcome and Landon now describes the dog as, " a great little boy." The training for "Stetson" and filming took about two years.

- Stetson has been socialized and is now a member of the Landon family.

=== Production ===
On the first day of shooting, the star of the film wandered off to revisit familiar surroundings, the entire film crew chased Stetson around the town of Park City, hoping that their investment in the film had not just walked away.

Stetson, Street Dog of Park City is a tour of the community's child friendly shops and activities; narrated from the perspective of a small dog.

Stetson, Street Dog of Park City is set and filmed entirely in Park City.

Many scenes were filmed at knee-level to simulate a dog's eye perspective for the film; additionally, the winter setting compounded difficulty for the camera crew as their clothing became wet in the daytime and filming often continued into the evenings. Many of the conveniences of larger budget films were unavailable, for instance, a skateboard was used as a camera-dolly for a scene where Stetson crawls forward under the church pews.

=== Post-production ===
The voice actors for Stetson, Street Dog of Park City, Lesley Ann Fogle (narrator) and Silas Beuhrig (the voice of Stetson) worked together Dayton, Ohio. Nancy Ogden directed Fogle and Beuhrig from her location in South Dartmouth, Massachusetts

== Release ==
Premier: Stetson, Street Dog of Park City, premiered at the Talisker Club on January 19, 2012, at 6:00pm. The film premiered during the Sundance Film Festival although the film was not included the Festival.

Screenings:

- March 24, 2012 - International Family Film Festival - Raleigh Studios - Hollywood, Ca. 10am
- March 29, 2012 - Salt Lake County Library - Sandy, Utah

=== Home media ===
A U.S. and Canadian version of Stetson, Street Dog of Park City is available in English on DVD.

== Reception ==
=== Critical response ===
Stetson, Street Dog of Park City has received The Dove Foundation's highest rating and is Dove Family-Approved.

== Accolades ==
- In 2012, Director and Producer, Nancy Ogden (Campbell & Company LLC), was a finalist in the International Family Film Festival's, "Best Mixed Media" category for, Stetson, Street Dog of Park City
- Stetson, Street Dog of Park City: "Official Selection", Eugene International Film Festival 2012 and awarded "Best Young Audience Short" for 2012.
- Stetson, Street Dog of Park City has been selected for the second annual Kid'z Filmz festival, screening on February 10, 3:30 p.m., at the Aalgonquin Theatre in Manasquan, New Jersey.
- Stetson, Street Dog of Park City has been selected for the Providence Children's Film Festival, screening on Saturday, February 16, 2013, 12:05 PM, and Saturday, February 16, 2013, 12:05 PM, at the Metcalf Auditorium in Providence, Rhode Island.
