= Hollywood Arms (play) =

Play by Carrie Hamilton and Carol Burnett

- Original poster
- Original language: English
- Written by: Carrie Hamilton; Carol Burnett
- Genre: Dramedy
- Setting: A dilapidated apartment building in Hollywood, 1941 and 1951

Premiere
- Date: April 9, 2002
- Place: Goodman Theatre, Chicago

Hollywood Arms is a play by Carrie Hamilton and Carol Burnett. It ran at the Goodman Theatre and on Broadway in 2002. The play is adapted from Carol Burnett's memoir One More Time.

== Background and productions ==
The dramedy is set in Hollywood, California in 1941 and 1951, and centers on the heartbreak and laughter shared by three generations of women living on welfare in a dingy apartment house. The cast of characters, based on Carol Burnett and her real-life relatives, includes no-nonsense grandmother Nanny; Louise, a beautiful, alcoholic mother determined to be a writer for movie magazines; Jody, an absent father who is struggling with his own demons; and Helen, a young girl whose only escape is the rooftop of their rundown building, where she creates her own magical world and dreams of a successful show business career.

The first workshop, still titled One More Time, was supported by the Sundance Theatre Lab at the Sundance Resort in Utah during a two-week span in the summer of 1998. Carrie Hamilton never saw her work reach the stage. On January 20, 2002, she died of brain and lung cancer. Burnett, determined that the play serve as a tribute to her late daughter's memory, brought it to the Goodman Theatre in Chicago, where it opened on April 9, 2002. Directed by Hal Prince, the cast included Linda Lavin as Nanny, Michele Pawk as Louise, Frank Wood as Jody, and Sara Niemietz and Donna Lynne Champlin as the younger and older Helen, with Barbara E. Robertson, Nicolas King, Patrick Clear, and Emily Graham-Handley in supporting roles.

The Broadway production, also directed by Prince, opened on October 31, 2002 at the Cort Theatre, where it ran for 76 performances and 28 previews. Most of the Chicago cast remained with the play, with Leslie Hendrix replacing Barbara E. Robertson. Michele Pawk won the Tony Award for Best Performance by a Featured Actress in a Play. Composer Robert Lindsey-Nassif provided the original score. Judith Dolan designed costumes for the production.

Burnett, Pawk, Tyne Daly, Emily Skeggs, Sydney Lucas, Anthony Edwards, Cotter Smith, Jenny Jules, Caleb McLaughlin, Hubert Point-Du Jour, Will Pullen, Izzy Hanson-Johnston, Erik Liberman and Ben Wexler, directed by Mark Brokaw, participated in a one-time reading of the play on September 21, 2015 at Merkin Concert Hall in New York City.

== Critical reception ==
Reviewing the play at the Goodman Theatre for The New York Times, Bruce Weber wrote,

"Borrowing from the likes of Herb Gardner and Neil Simon, the play has the tone (if not the professionally honed structure) of A Thousand Clowns West or maybe Venice Beach Memoirs.... [T]he narrative conforms more to the contours of biography than invented drama. That is, there's a lot that seems to be here because it was actually so, not because it suits a well-crafted tale.... [T]he play doesn't persuasively argue that it is compelling in itself. Much of its interest has to do with the celebrity of its subject.... It's a story of haplessness and waste and the inexorable narrowing of lives to nothing. But because this is a star's tale, and it has a happy ending, there is something sanitized, if not gilded, about it all. Circumstances never seem oppressive or as entirely unpleasant and depressing as they must, in truth, have been."

Reviewing the Broadway production for The New York Times, Bruce Weber observed,

"In its Broadway incarnation...the show...has made strides from the version that appeared in the spring at the Goodman Theater in Chicago. Strains of seriousness and ambition are more clearly evident.... But like the kind of teenage girl that Ms. Burnett suggests she never was, the play still suffers through a million identity crises. It reaches for the organic independence of inventive fiction but stays with the training wheels of the biographical format.... So a play that can't make up its mind whether to be a potent family saga or an episodic comedy worthy of a laugh track ends up ignoring what it has: a potentially bruising and affecting drama about the tough life of a woman in Hollywood in the 1940s and '50s. Instead, I found myself thinking more than once that Hollywood Arms is what would have resulted if television executives had gotten their hands on a script by O'Neill."

Lawrence Frascella of Entertainment Weekly graded it B and commented,

"[W]hile it's not the most trenchant piece of writing you'll ever experience, under Harold Prince's expert direction some very harsh material takes on a warm, appealingly nostalgic glow . . . This moving production may kick off a new media subgenre: the Broadway-bound star autobiography."

Writing for the website Talkin' Broadway, Matthew Murray wrote it

"has a tendency to play as little more than a series of skits, such as might have been found on Burnett's variety show. Some are comic, some are serious, but nearly all feel incomplete, different pieces of a puzzle that never come together to form a complete picture. More than once, when a scene appears ready to explode into powerful drama, the lights fade out, preventing the show from establishing a real dramatic connection with the audience. Still, a number of the elements are interesting; the show may be disconnected, but it's never boring."

Reviewing the play for New York Magazine, John Simon wrote,

Plays about passion are profuse and easy: heterosexual or homosexual, interracial or senescent, kinky or chaste. What is difficult and rare is a play about affection, which is what Carrie Hamilton and Carol Burnett's Hollywood Arms is. Authentic affection: not syrupy or sentimental, posturing or feel-good-ish, gussied up for theatrical effect. Hollywood Arms is about real people who fight or let one another down, jab and jeer, needle and explode, but also, when need be, help people who are sarcastic or pathetic failures, impoverished and disappointed.

That Linda Lavin is a fabulous Nanny you don't need me to tell you, but this always remarkable actress manages here to surpass even the stiff competition of her own previous triumphs, squeezing every last drop out of her part without the slightest trace of ham or plea for sympathy. Scarcely less admirable is the Louise of Michele Pawk, who lends great heft to a humdrum character, making her intensely human and profoundly moving. Donna Lynne Champlin is unswervingly straightforward as the grown Helen, and Sara Niemietz makes little Helen lovable with never an iota of cuteness. Amazing, too, is the Malcolm of Nicolas King, a child actor with timing to make old pros envious. Frank Wood is an honestly unembellished Jody, and Patrick Clear a restrainedly sympathetic Bill. Leslie Hendrix and Emily Graham-Handley lend savvy support, as do the impeccable décor of Walt Spangler, Judith Dolan's incisive costumes, and Howell Binkley's empathetic lighting. Robert Lindsey Nassif's accompanying music also adds distinctly to our pleasure.

But Hollywood Arms has yet another form of invaluable affection, that of Harold Prince for the characters and their story. You will never see more feelingful insight, more self-effacing love for their quirks, foibles, and kindnesses, from a director for his stage children, big and small. If only this thoroughly endearing play and production could have been seen by Burnett's daughter and co-author, Carrie Hamilton, dead before even the Goodman Theatre premiere. One fervently hopes that the joy of such a true creation accompanied her on her final journey.

== Awards and nominations ==
=== Original Broadway production ===
Year	Award	Category	Nominee	Result
2003	Tony Award	Best Featured Actress in a Play	Michele Pawk	Won
