= Keep Coming Back (song) =

1991 single by Richard Marx

Single by Richard Marx

from the album Rush Street
- B-side: "I Get No Sleep"; "Superstar"
- Released: October 7, 1991
- Genre: R&B
- Length: 6:51 (album version); 4:49 (DJ edit version)
- Label: Capitol
- Songwriter: Richard Marx
- Producer: Richard Marx

Richard Marx singles chronology
"Children of the Night" (1990)	"Keep Coming Back" (1991)	"Hazard" (1992)

"Keep Coming Back" is a song by American singer-songwriter Richard Marx. It appears on his third solo album, Rush Street (1991), and was both written and produced by Marx. The lyrics to the song detail a man's unrequited love for a woman. Working with musicians such as Luther Vandross (who added backing vocals to the track) and keyboardist Greg Phillinganes, Marx sought to explore different musical territory with this single, stating that "I wanted to write an old-fashioned R&B song."

The song became Marx's 10th top-40 hit in the United States, reaching number five on the Cash Box Top 100 and number 12 on the Billboard Hot 100 in late 1991. It also spent four weeks atop the Billboard Adult Contemporary chart, reached number three in Canada, and topped the Canadian Adult Contemporary chart for five weeks (two weeks if not counting the holiday period in which no charts were published).

== Additional releases ==
- Marx also recorded a Spanish-language version of the song as "Volver A Ti" (Keep Coming Back En Español) on the album, Lo Mejor- Especialmente Para Chile (Capitol 1992).
- "Keep Coming Back" also appears on Marx', 2012 album and DVD (televised performance) box-set, A Night Out With Friends, with Marx and Sara Niemietz performing a live duet.

== Track listings ==
- US 7-inch single

A. "Keep Coming Back" (edit) – 4:49
B. "I Get No Sleep" – 3:44

- US cassette single
1. "Keep Coming Back"
2. "Playing with Fire" (sample)
3. "Superstar" (sample)
4. "Calling You" (sample)
- US and Canadian CD single
1. "Keep Coming Back" (LP version) – 6:51
2. "Keep Coming Back" (AOR mix featuring Eric Johnson) – 5:26
3. "Keep Coming Back" (Spanish version) – 6:46
4. "Superstar" (LP version) – 4:42
- UK 7-inch single

A. "Keep Coming Back" (edit)
B. "Superstar"

- UK 12-inch single

A1. "Keep Coming Back"
B1. "Keep Coming Back" (quiet storm mix)
B2. "Superstar"

- UK CD single
1. "Keep Coming Back" (edit) – 4:49
2. "Keep Coming Back" (AOR mix featuring Eric Johnson) – 5:26
3. "Keep Coming Back" (Spanish version) – 6:46
- Australasian cassette single and Japanese mini-CD single
1. "Keep Coming Back"
2. "Superstar"

== Personnel ==
- Richard Marx – lead vocals
- Michael Egizi – keyboards
- Greg Phillinganes – Fender Rhodes
- Bruce Gaitsch – guitars
- Nathan East – bass
- Jonathan Moffett – drums
- Steve Grove – saxophone
- Luther Vandross – backing vocals

== Charts ==
=== Weekly charts ===
Chart (1991–1992)	Peak position
Australia (ARIA)	34
Canada Top Singles (RPM)	3
Canada Adult Contemporary (RPM)	1
Europe (European Hit Radio)	9
Germany (GfK)	52
Luxembourg (Radio Luxembourg)	6
Netherlands (Single Top 100)	40
New Zealand (Recorded Music NZ)	32
Sweden (Sverigetopplistan)	37
Switzerland (Schweizer Hitparade)	22
UK Singles (Official Charts)	55
UK Airplay (Music Week)	36
US Billboard Hot 100	12
US Adult Contemporary (Billboard)	1
US Hot R&B/Hip-Hop Songs (Billboard)	71
US Cash Box Top 100	5

=== Year-end charts ===
Chart (1991)	Position
Canada Top Singles (RPM)	74
Canada Adult Contemporary (RPM)	87

Chart (1992)	Position
Canada Top Singles (RPM)	61
Canada Adult Contemporary (RPM)	30
US Billboard Hot 100	92
US Adult Contemporary (Billboard)	16
US Cash Box Top 100	41

== Release history ==
Region	Date	Format(s)	Label(s)	Ref.
United Kingdom	October 7, 1991	7-inch vinyl; 12-inch vinyl; CD; cassette	Capitol	
United States	October 14, 1991	7-inch vinyl; CD; cassette	Capitol	
Australia	November 11, 1991	CD; cassette	Capitol	
Japan	November 13, 1991	Mini-CD	Capitol	

== See also ==
- List of Hot Adult Contemporary number ones of 1991 and 1992
