= One More Time (book) =

Book by Carol Burnett

One More Time: A Memoir
- One More Time (2003 edition cover)
- Author: Carol Burnett
- Language: English
- Genre: Autobiography
- Publisher: Random House Trade Paperbacks
- Publication date: September 12, 1986; August 12, 2003
- Publication place: United States
- Media type: Audiobook (1986 Warner audiotape), Ebook, Print
- Pages: 359 (1st ed. hardcover); 400 (2nd ed. paperback)
- ISBN: 978-0394552545
- OCLC: 15362932

One More Time is a 1986 memoir by comedian Carol Burnett. It was published by Random House and became a New York Times non-fiction bestseller.

Burnett spent her childhood in a Depression-scarred Hollywood neighborhood, where she lived in a dingy single-room apartment with her grandmother. The child of alcoholic parents - a mother who fantasized about success in Hollywood and a father who eventually was committed to a public sanatorium - she constantly daydreamed about a show business career while at the same time realizing the odds of achieving one were very much against her, until a mysterious benefactor financed her move to New York City. In this book, she presents a coming of age tale that's humorous, heartbreaking, and hopeful.

The book served as the basis for the play Hollywood Arms, which Burnett co-wrote with her daughter Carrie Hamilton.
