= Lauren Ellis (musician) =

- Born: San Francisco Bay Area, California, U.S.
- Genres: Blues
- Occupation: Musician
- Instrument: Slide guitar
- Labels: Slidechic
- Website: www.laurenellis.com

Lauren Ellis is an American slide guitar player with an emphasis on the blues.

== Career ==
Born and raised in the San Francisco Bay Area, Ellis has a rich background as a multi-instrumentalist, singer, and songwriter.

She has worked with artists like Rita Coolidge, Nell Carter, Peter Tork of The Monkees, Don and Dewey, Boo-Boo Fine Jelly and The Scarletts Ellis has opened shows for Bonnie Raitt, Patti Griffin, Etta James, The Fabulous Thunderbirds, James Brown, The Texas Tornados, Jimmy Thackery, John Mayall, Marty Stuart, The Kentucky Headhunters, Mary Chapin Carpenter, Dave Mason, and many more.

=== Push the River ===
Professional ratings
Review scores
Source	Rating
AllMusic	3/5 stars

Ellis moved to Los Angeles where she wrote and recorded her first album, Push The River. She was joined on the album by Roy Bittan of the E Street Band, session guitarist Dean Parks, Neil Stubenhaus on bass guitar, and Herman Matthews on drums. This album helped Ellis win Outstanding Guitarist at the 9th annual Los Angeles Music Awards.

Heather Phares of AllMusic gives Push the River 3 stars out of a possible 5 and writes, "Lauren Ellis' debut album Push the River follows the bluesy, heartfelt path of Bonnie Raitt and Melissa Etheridge's work, but her style is less gritty and more pop-oriented."

=== Feels Like Family ===
Professional ratings
Review scores
Source	Rating
PopMatters	4/10 stars

Relocating to Nashville, Tennessee she worked on her second album, Feels Like Family. This album featured musicians Tony Joe White, Viktor Krauss, Dean Parks, and Kenny Malone.

In 2005, Ellis won Surround Music Awards' Horizon Award for Best Newcomer To Surround for her recording of Feels Like Family.

In 2006, Alpine, the car stereo company, licensed the song "End of our Line" from the Dual-Disc of Feels Like Family to be included on their Surround Music DVD Audio Sampler to demonstrate the new 5.1 Surround music systems in the high-line cars for that year.

Pure Music writes, "Her first CD, Push The River, was a more AC/pop oriented effort, with a host of high profile L.A. session player friends. Feels Like Family is more on the roots rocking side (the notes say that Lucinda encouraged her to rock) and points up the R&B, blues and rock chops she's got in spades."

Roger Holland reviews Feels Like Family for PopMatters and concludes with, "Here's the twist: the third track on Feels Like Family is called "End of the Line", and it's almost marvellous. It's a blues piece with the oh-so sophisticated '80s feel that can only come from a man with bad highlights, designer stubble, an expensive tan and the sleeves of his Armani jacket rolled up to the elbow. It's the Eagles' "Witchy Woman" on qualudes. It's Ellis delivering a near uncanny Sade impression. "A woman thinks her man is gonna change/ And a man thinks his baby won't." This song, my friends, this song is why they invented iTunes."

Michael McCall of Nashville Scene writes, "Although her guitar work always has a blues feel, her writing and arranging draw on folk, adult pop and Hawaiian steel guitar music, among other things. The result is an 11-song collection with a breadth that shows a creative restlessness rare in this age of genre-conscious music-making."

The review at STLBlues says, "Feels Like Family has: Delta, Country, slow songs, Chicago-like electric guitar, acoustic, slide and rock. I liked this CD/DVD combo a lot, the music is pure and touched me. I found the songs to have a great deal of depth – vocally, Ellis is masterful."

=== 2011–present ===
In 2011, Ellis moved to Austin, Texas. When she isn't writing or performing, she repairs and restores stringed instruments. She has toured The States and abroad as guitar technician for The Monkees, The Knack, and the Eagles. She has her own shop at MusicMakers, near downtown Austin.

== Discography ==
Title
Label
Released

All tracks are written by Lauren Ellis, except as noted.

Push The River
No.	Title	Writer(s)	Length
1.	"Count on Me"		5:08
2.	"No Reply"		4:53
3.	"More than This"		4:39
4.	"Eye to Eye"		5:11
5.	"All or Nothing"		5:27
6.	"Mockingbird Blues"		5:29
7.	"Time of Our Lives"		4:59
8.	"Blame It on the Real World"		5:26
9.	"Real Love"	Lauren Ellis; Dean Parks	4:14
10.	"Time Will Tell the Story"		4:11
11.	"As the Crow Flies"	Tony Joe White	4:25
12.	"I Must Be Doing Something Right"		5:00
Total length:			59:02

Slidechick Records
July 6, 1999

All tracks are written by Lauren Ellis, except as noted.

Feels Like Family
No.	Title	Writer(s)	Length
1.	"Dry as a Bone"		5:11
2.	"Shades of Blue"		5:03
3.	"End of Our Line"		5:31
4.	"Afraid of Love"		3:20
5.	"Just to Be with You"	Bernard Roth	4:48
6.	"Feels like Family"		5:29
7.	"When I See You"		4:29
8.	"Livin' in a Dream"		4:15
9.	"Setting Son"		4:56
10.	"Oahu Song"		3:28
11.	"Extra Mile"	Daniel Timms	4:18
Total length:			50:48

2003

- Track information and credits adapted from Discogs and AllMusic. Also verified from the album's liner notes.
