= Push Play (EP) =

EP by Sara Niemietz
- Released: June 14, 2012
- Recorded: Taylor Made Studios; Los Angeles, California
- Genre: Rock, jazz, blues
- Length: 22:48
- Language: English
- Label: Indie
- Producer: W. G. Snuffy Walden, Sara Niemietz

Sara Niemietz chronology
Without A Net	Push Play

Push Play is the third independent CD release for singer, songwriter and actress, Sara Niemietz. Produced by Emmy Award winner, W. G. Snuffy Walden and Sara Niemietz, Push Play is an EP consisting of six original songs.

== Description ==
Push Play showcases the musical style of Sara Niemietz in collaboration with Emmy Award winning composer-instrumentalist W. G. Snuffy Walden and Grammy Award winning composer-producer Glen Ballard.

Stephen K. Peeples, announced the release of Push Play on the June 20, 2012 presentation of SCVNews. SCVTV airs on cable channels 20 and 99 in Santa Clarita, California, Est. population 177,641. AtlasJams interviewed Niemietz about her career, how she met and started working with Walden and announced the EP release in May 2012.

== Musicians ==
- Glen Ballard, synths
- Aaron Beaumont, piano
- George Doering, guitar, bass
- Randy Kerber, piano
- Herman Matthews, drums
- Sara Niemietz, vocals, piano, guitar
- Bennett Salvay, piano, cello arrangement, conducting
- Andrew Schulman, cello
- W.G. Snuffy Walden, guitar, bowed guitar, piano, synths, backup vocals

== Production ==
Produced by: W.G. Snuffy Walden and Sara Niemietz

"Dangerous Outside" produced by: Glen Ballard, W.G. Snuffy Walden and Sara Niemietz

- Glen Ballard, programming
- Scott Cambell, engineering ("Dangerous Outside")
- Dave Donnelly, mastering
- Avi Kipper, engineering ("On Your Way")
- George Landress, engineering
- W.G. Snuffy Walden, programming
- Kiya Wilson, CD design

== Track listing ==
Track listing for Push Play (2012)
No.	Title	Writer(s)	Length
1.	"Dangerous Outside"	Sara Niemietz, Glen Ballard, W.G. Snuffy Walden	4:14
2.	"Evening"	Sara Niemietz, W.G. Snuffy Walden	3:25
3.	"Go to Bed"	Sara Niemietz	3:38
4.	"Rooftops"	Sara Niemietz, W.G. Snuffy Walden	3:39
5.	"Anomala"	Sara Niemietz, W.G. Snuffy Walden	3:20
6.	"On Your Way"	Sara Niemietz, W.G. Snuffy Walden	4:32
