= A Night Out with Friends =

Live album by Richard Marx
- Released: June 19, 2012
- Venues: Arcada Theatre, St. Charles, Illinois
- Genres: Rock; pop; acoustic
- Length: 56:00
- Labels: Zanzibar Records; TourDForce Productions; Fontana
- Producer: Richard Marx

Richard Marx chronology
Inside My Head (2012)	A Night Out with Friends (2012)	Christmas Spirit (2012)

Professional ratings
Review scores
Source	Rating
Allmusic	3/5 stars

A Night Out With Friends is a live album by singer-songwriter and music producer Richard Marx. Recorded live at the Arcadia Theatre in St. Charles, Illinois, the CD and DVD album was released by Fontana Records on June 19, 2012. Accompanying the release of the album, the live performance video was broadcast on PBS', Front Row Center concert series, episode 109 began airing on May 31, 2012. The concert features guest appearances by Sara Niemietz, Matt Scannell, JC Chasez, and Hugh Jackman.

== Track listing ==
All tracks are written by Richard Marx, except where noted.

CD
No.	Title	Length
1.	"Endless Summer Nights"	3:55
2.	"One Thing Left"	3:58
3.	"Hazard"	4:17
4.	"Through My Veins"	4:45
5.	"When You Loved Me"	3:47
6.	"This I Promise You" (with JC Chasez)	4:12
7.	"The Letter" (with Hugh Jackman)	3:08
8.	"Satisfied"	6:04
9.	"Should've Known Better"	4:30
10.	"Right Here Waiting"	8:03
11.	"Over My Head" (Bonus track)	3:54
12.	"Wouldn't Let Me Love You" (Bonus track)	3:57
Total length:		56:00

DVD
No.	Title	Writer(s)	Length
1.	"Endless Summer Nights"
2.	"Keep Coming Back" (with Sara Niemietz)
3.	"One Thing Left"
4.	"Hazard"
5.	"You're a God" (with Matt Scannell)	Scannell
6.	"Hold On to the Nights / Now and Forever"
7.	"Always on Your Mind"
8.	"Save Me"
9.	"Through My Veins"
10.	"Take This Heart"
11.	"When You Loved Me"
12.	"Better Life"
13.	"This I Promise You" (with JC Chasez)
14.	"The Letter" (with Hugh Jackman)
15.	"To Where You Are" (with Hugh Jackman)
16.	"Angelia"
17.	"Satisfied"
18.	"Should've Known Better"
19.	"The Way She Loves Me"
20.	"Don't Mean Nothing"	Marx; Bruce Gaitsch
21.	"Right Here Waiting"
