= Andrew Shulman =

English cellist, conductor and composer (born 1960)

Andrew Shulman (born 1960 in London, England) is an English virtuoso cellist, conductor and composer. He is currently the principal cellist of the Los Angeles Chamber Orchestra.

== Career ==
He was formerly principal cellist of the Philharmonia Orchestra, the Academy of St Martin in the Fields, the Los Angeles Philharmonic Orchestra.

=== Performances ===
He has performed cello concertos with the City of Birmingham Symphony, Utah Symphony.

=== Recordings ===
Recent recordings include Broughton's cello concerto, Stone's cello concerto 'Siddhartha', Broughton's sonata for cello and piano and Zigman's Rhapsody for cello and piano. He has recorded 26 CDs with the Britten Quartet (EMI and Collins) and has made solo recordings for Virgin (Vivaldi) and EMI (Janáček). He made a world premiere recording of Frederick Delius's complete cello works, and was solo cello on Elton John's Candle in the Wind 1997.

=== Composition ===
Shulman also composes, and recently premiered his Smaller Music For Strings in the UK, as well as collaborating with the German rock guitarist Uli Jon Roth in performances in Hollywood. His electric cello rock instrumental H.A.N.D was a winner in the International Songwriting Competition of 2007.

=== Music education ===
After winning the New England Conservatory/Piatigorsky Artist Award in Boston, he returned to the US to teach and give concerts. Now residing in Los Angeles, he has given masterclasses at The Corwin Awards, USC, UCLA and The Aspen Music Festival. He is a regular guest artist at the La Jolla Summerfest, Aspen, Las Vegas and Mainly Mozart summer music festivals, and last season recorded three new cello concertos written for him. These were written by Christopher Stone, Nathaniel Levisay and Maria Newman.

This season CDs of concertos by Stone and Broughton are being released on all formats. He formed the Los Angeles Piano Trio in 2020 and is a member of the New Hollywood String Quartet.
