= Christmas Spirit (Richard Marx album) =

Studio album by Richard Marx
- Released: October 22, 2012
- Studios: Ocean Way Nashville, Sound Stage Studios and Blackbird Studio (Nashville, Tennessee); Renegade Studios (Chicago, Illinois)
- Genre: Christmas
- Length: 47:51 (standard edition); 60:40 (Target edition)
- Labels: Zanzibar Records; TourDeForce Productions
- Producer: Richard Marx

Richard Marx chronology
A Night Out with Friends (2012)	Christmas Spirit (2012)	Seven & Seven (2012)

Singles from Christmas Spirit
- 1. "Christmas Spirit" Released: November 2011; 2. "Santa Claus Is Coming to Town" Released: October 18, 2012; 3. "Little Drummer Boy" Released: October 27, 2012; 4. "Christmas Mornings" Released: November 3, 2012; 5. "O Holy Night" Released: December 2012; 6. "I Heard The Bells On Christmas Day" Released: December 17, 2016; 7. "Happy New Year, Old Friend" Released: November 22, 2019; 8. "Holiday" Released: October 30, 2020

Professional ratings
Review scores
Source	Rating
AllMusic	3/5 stars

Christmas Spirit is a Christmas seasonal release album by Richard Marx, released in October 2012. Five tracks on the album previously appeared on his 2011 release, The Christmas EP. Christmas Spirit reached No. 181 on the Billboard 200 albums chart and No. 21 on the Billboard Top Christmas Albums chart.

Two of its new tracks became top 20 Adult Contemporary hits. "I Heard The Bells On Christmas Day" is based on Casting Crowns arrangement of the song from their Peace On Earth album. Christmas Spirit yielded five singles, including "Christmas Spirit", "Santa Claus Is Coming To Town", "The Little Drummer Boy", "Christmas Mornings" and "O Holy Night".

The album features duets with Kenny Loggins, Sara Watkins and Sara Niemietz.

Marx returned to the Billboard Adult Contemporary chart's Top Ten chart with Little Drummer Boy in December 2012.

On November 3, 2023, Barnes & Noble released the album with two previously released Christmas tracks: "Holiday" and "Happy New Year, Old Friend".

== Track listing ==
=== CD version ===
Standard release
No.	Title	Writer(s)	Length
1.	"The Christmas Song"	Mel Tormé; Bob Wells	4:33
2.	"Christmas Spirit"	Richard Marx; Fee Waybill	4:07
3.	"I Heard the Bells on Christmas Day"	Henry Wadsworth Longfellow; Mark Hall; Dale Oliver; Bernie Herms	4:26
4.	"Let There Be Peace on Earth" (duet with Kenny Loggins)	Jill Miller; Sy Miller	3:14
5.	"O Come All Ye Faithful"	Traditional	3:33
6.	"Little Drummer Boy"	Katherine Kennicott Davis; Harry Simeone; Henry Onorati	4:30
7.	"O Holy Night"	Adolphe Adam; Placide Cappeau	3:55
8.	"What Child Is This"	William Chatterton Dix	3:46
9.	"Silent Night" (duet with Sara Watkins)	Franz Xaver Gruber; Joseph Mohr	3:14
10.	"Christmas Mornings"	R. Marx; Dave Grusin	4:14
11.	"Santa Claus Is Coming to Town" (duet with Sara Niemietz)	John Frederick Coots; Haven Gillespie	2:29
12.	"White Christmas"	Irving Berlin	4:08
13.	"Alleluia"	Larry Gatlin	1:42
Total length:			47:51

Target exclusive bonus tracks
No.	Title	Writer(s)	Length
14.	"Blue Christmas"	Billy Hayes; Jay W. Johnson	2:42
15.	"Silver Bells"	Jay Livingston; Ray Evans	3:22
16.	"Jingle Bell Rock"	Joe Beal; Jim Boothe	2:18
17.	"Have Yourself a Merry Little Christmas"	Ralph Blane; Hugh Martin	4:26
Total length:			60:40

=== Barnes & Noble exclusive candy cane vinyl ===
Side one
No.	Title	Writer(s)	Length
1.	"The Christmas Song"	Tormé; Wells	4:33
2.	"Christmas Spirit"	R. Marx; Waybill	4:07
3.	"I Heard the Bells on Christmas Day"	Longfellow; Hall; Oliver; Herms	4:26
4.	"Let There Be Peace on Earth" (duet with Kenny Loggins)	J. Miller; S. Miller	3:14
5.	"O Come All Ye Faithful"	Traditional	3:33
6.	"Little Drummer Boy"	Davis; Simeone; Onorati	4:30

Side two
No.	Title	Writer(s)	Length
7.	"O Holy Night"	Adam; Cappeau	3:55
8.	"Holiday"	R. Marx; Lucas Marx; Lydia Frutig	3:02
9.	"Happy New Year, Old Friend"	R. Marx; Chely Wright	4:06
10.	"Christmas Mornings"	R. Marx; Grusin	4:14
11.	"Santa Claus Is Coming to Town" (duet with Sara Niemietz)	Coots; Gillespie	2:29
12.	"White Christmas"	Berlin	4:08
13.	"Alleluia"	Gatlin	1:42

== Chart performance ==
Chart (2012)	Peak position
Billboard 200	181

== Album credits ==
Musicians

- Richard Marx – lead vocals, backing vocals (2, 6, 8, 13, 17), arrangements (2, 4, 6, 8, 9, 11, 12, 17), keyboards (2, 6), additional arrangements (3), acoustic piano (3, 4, 10), acoustic guitar (3, 4, 9), electric guitar (3, 7), string arrangements (4, 7, 10)
- Jason Webb – acoustic piano (1, 5, 8, 11, 12, 17), arrangements (1)
- Michael Omartian – acoustic piano (2, 7, 9)
- Jerry McPherson – electric guitar (2–4, 6–8, 11, 12, 14–16), guitars (17)
- Matt Scannell – nylon guitar and solo (8)
- Mark Hill – bass (2–4, 6–9, 11, 12, 14–17)
- Steve Brewster – drums (2, 3, 7–9, 11, 12, 14–17)
- Will Sayles – drums (4, 6)
- Sara Watkins – fiddle (9), lead vocals (9)
- David Davidson – arrangements (5, 8, 17), string arrangements (8, 12)
- Cliff Colnot – string arrangements (9)
- Steve Mauldin – string arrangements (11)
- Opal Staples – backing vocals (2)
- Simbryt Whittington – backing vocals (2)
- Brandon Marx – backing vocals (3, 5, 7, 13)
- Jesse Marx – backing vocals (3, 5, 7, 13)
- Lucas Marx – backing vocals (3, 5, 7, 13)
- Kenny Loggins – lead vocals (4)
- Cynthia Rhodes Marx – backing vocals (5)
- Ruth Marx – backing vocals (5)
- Sara Niemietz – lead vocals (11)

Production

- Producer – Richard Marx
- Engineering and Mixing – Justin Niebank (Tracks 1–13 & 17); Matt Prock (Tracks 14–16).
- Additional Engineering – Drew Bollman, Chip Matthews, Seth Morton, Alan Parker, Matt Prock and Nate Yarborough.
- Mastered by Benny Quinn at Benny Quinn Mastering (Nashville, Tennessee).
- Photography – Nels Isrealson
- Management – Diarmuid Quinn
