= W. G. Snuffy Walden =

American composer and musician

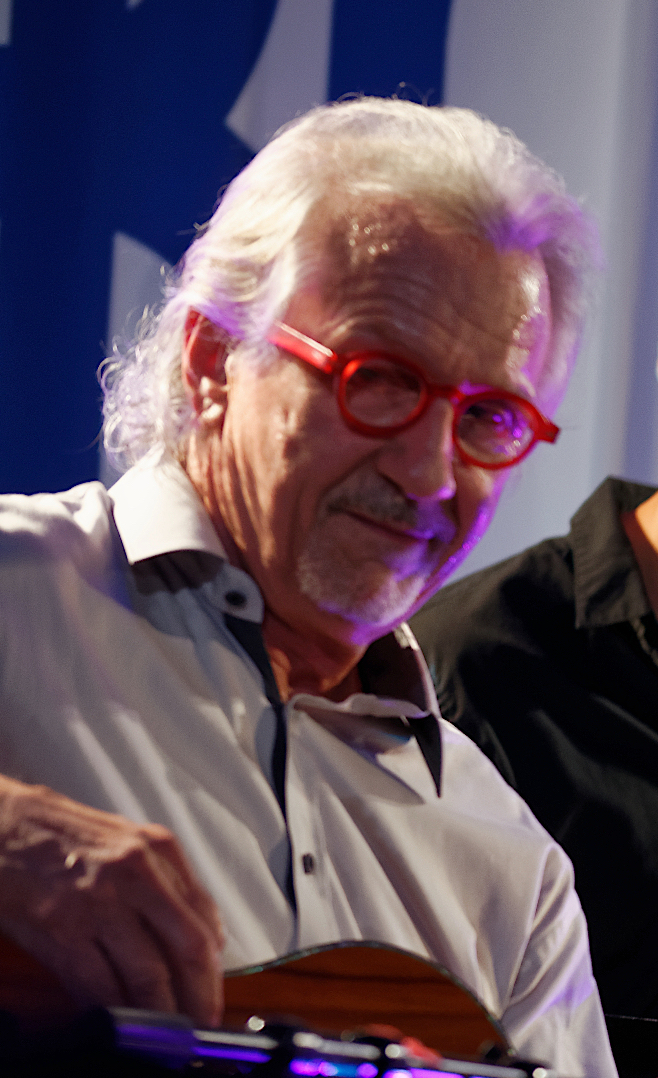
- Walden in 2016

Background information
- Also known as: Snuffy Walden; W. G. Walden
- Born: William Garrett Walden; February 13, 1950 (age 76); Louisiana, U.S.
- Genre: Instrumental
- Occupations: Composer; musician
- Instrument: Guitar
- Years active: 1973–present
- Website: snuffywalden.com

William Garrett Walden, known as W. G. Snuffy Walden (born February 13, 1950), is an American musician and composer of film and television soundtracks. Walden is an Primetime Emmy Award winner for the theme music to the television series The West Wing, has been nominated for numerous other Emmys throughout his career, and has received 26 BMI Awards.

== Early life ==
Walden was born in Louisiana on February 13, 1950 and raised in Houston, Texas. He graduated from Clear Creek High School in League City, Texas in 1967. In college he studied science and math, and he put himself through school working on a late-night radio show at KRBE in Houston and playing guitar in a strip club.

Walden's middle name was his mother's maiden name, and this was the origin of his nickname. Members of his mother's family had sometimes been called Snuffy after the Southern snuff manufacturer Levi Garrett. His family and schoolmates addressed him as Garrett, but Snuffy began to stick when he was away at summer camp and the name was preferred by fellow musicians as his career began.

== Career ==
In the late 1960s, Walden dropped out of school, quit his job, and devoted his energies to the guitar full-time, picking up a bass player (Al Roberts) and drummer (Randy Reeder) to form a three-piece band named Aphrodite. They started touring and wound up in Denver, playing local clubs and opening for acts like Buddy Miles. It was in Denver that Emerson, Lake & Palmer's road manager, Neville Chesters, saw them in a club and offered them a recording contract with ELP's label, Manticore. In 1972, the group moved to England and was reformed, keeping Al Roberts and changing the name to Stray Dog. There, they were signed to Manticore and Greg Lake produced three songs from their first album Stray Dog. The new group toured with ELP as the opening act, but never really took flight, and eventually folded. Following the breakup of the band, Walden supplanted the ailing Paul Kossoff by providing guitar tracks for Free's final album Heartbreaker, which was released in 1973 (Walden plays on 'Common Mortal Man', 'Easy on My Soul' and 'Seven Angels'). He also played electric guitar in 1973, on the debut solo album Still by King Crimson lyricist Peter Sinfield. In 1975, he joined The Eric Burdon Band and performed with them for a year.

In 1975, Walden moved to Los Angeles and spent the rest of the decade performing as a solo artist and supporting artists such as Stevie Wonder, Donna Summer, Chaka Khan, and Eric Burdon. Notably, in 1975-6 he again filled in for Paul Kossoff as a session musician on Back Street Crawler's Second Street album. By the mid-1980s, television agents and producers became aware of Walden through his local performances in Santa Monica. When approached to score a new television show, Walden had mixed feelings but accepted the offer. "I could see the handwriting on the wall for touring," he would later remember, "and it wasn't pretty. I kept envisioning Holiday Inn at age 60." The television show he was hired for was Thirtysomething, which turned out to be a major hit television series and dramatically altered Walden's music career.

Following his success as a touring and session musician and an Emmy nomination for the "Theme from Thirtysomething", Walden scored numerous television series, including The Wonder Years, Roseanne, Ellen, My So-Called Life, Felicity, Early Edition, Sports Night, The West Wing, George Lopez, I'll Fly Away, The Stand, Huff, Once and Again, Friday Night Lights and Studio 60 on the Sunset Strip.

In the summer of 2001, Walden released a solo album of mainly acoustic guitar pieces titled Music by... W. G. Snuffy Walden. The album included expanded or full versions of many of Walden's themes, such as "Once and Again", "Eugene's Ragtop", "Thirtysomething (Revisited)", and "West Wing Suite".

In July 2002, Tom Guerra conducted a comprehensive interview of Walden for Vintage Guitar Magazine. In April 2008, Stephen J. Abramson interviewed Walden for a four-hour, multi-part video series for the Television Academy.

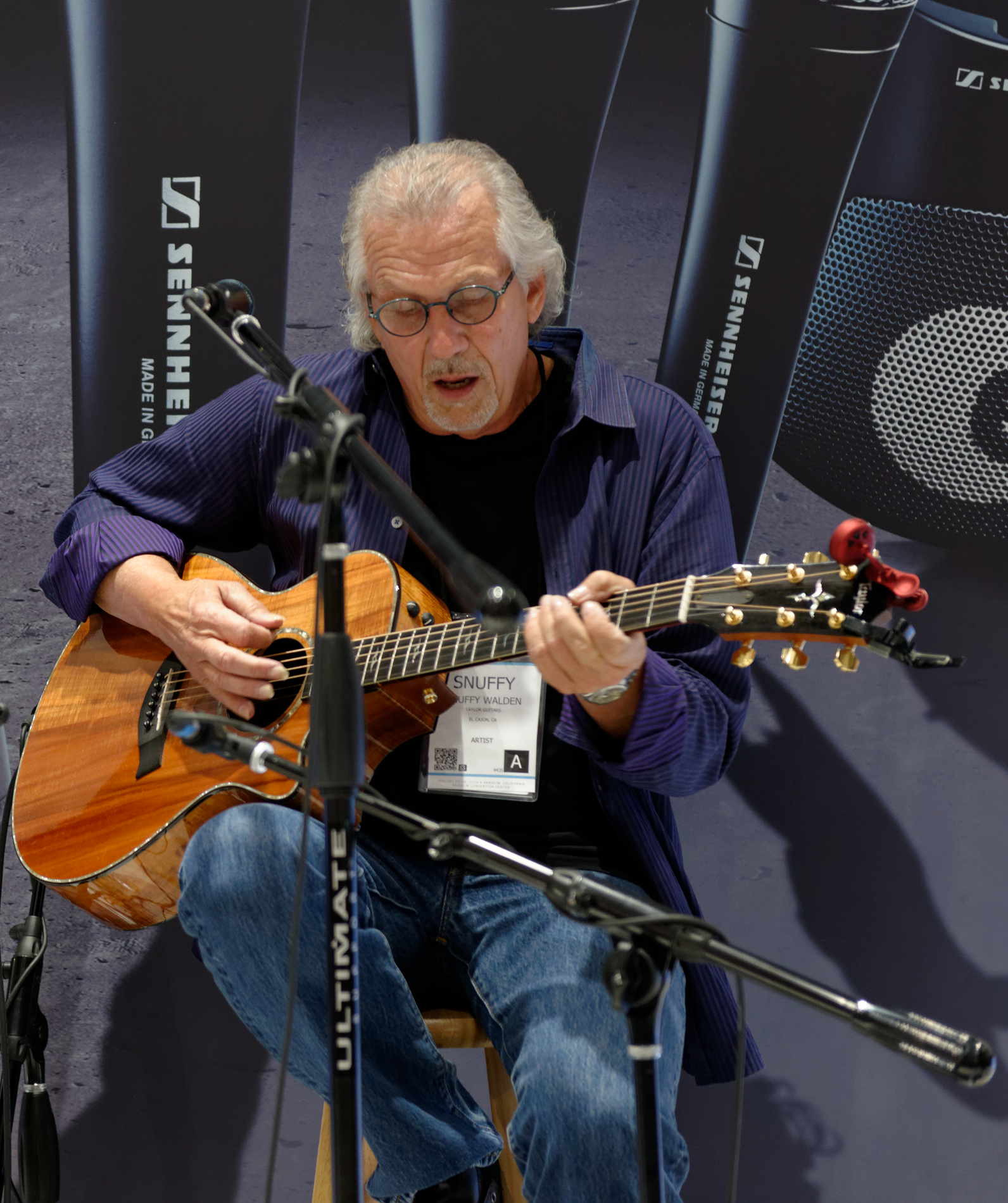
Walden in 2014

In March 2018, Up to Snuff, a documentary film about Walden's career, won the documentary competition in its premier at the Pasadena International Film Festival.

In September 2018, Walden starred in a 1950s style cover of "Africa" by Toto along with the musical collective Postmodern Jukebox on YouTube.

== Awards and nominations ==
=== Emmys ===
==== Awards ====
- 2000 Outstanding Main Title Theme Music – The West Wing

==== Nominations ====
- 1988 Main Title, Theme Music – Thirtysomething
- 1992 Main Title, Theme Music – I'll Fly Away
- 1994 Best Original Score – Stephen King's The Stand
- 1995 Main Title Theme Music – My So-Called Life
- 1997 Music Composition for a Series (Dramatic Underscore) – Early Edition
- 1997 Main Title Theme Music – Early Edition
- 2000 Music Composition for a Series (Dramatic Underscore) – Felicity
- 2000 Outstanding Main Title Theme Music – The West Wing (won)
- 2001 Music Composition for a Series (Dramatic Underscore) – The West Wing
- 2003 Outstanding Main Title Theme Music – Miracles
- 2005 Outstanding Main Title Theme Music – Huff
- 2007 Music Composition for a Series (Dramatic Underscore) – Kidnapped
- 2018 Outstanding Main Title Theme Music - SEAL Team

=== BMI Awards ===
- The Wonder Years (1988, 1989, 1990)
- The Jackie Thomas Show (1993)
- Ellen (1994, 1995)
- Roseanne (1994, 1995, 1996)
- The Drew Carey Show (1997, 1998, 1999, 2000, 2001)
- The Norm Show (1999)
- Richard Kirk Ward BMI Award for Outstanding Career Achievement (2001)
- Providence (1999, 2000, 2002, 2003)
- The West Wing (2000, 2001, 2002, 2003, 2004, 2005)
- Men of a Certain Age (2010)

== Discography ==
=== Solo albums ===
- Music by... W. G. Snuffy Walden (2001, Windham Hill Records)

=== Stray Dog albums ===
- Stray Dog (1973)
- Fasten Your Seat Belts (1973)
- While You're Down There (1974)

=== Guest appearances ===
- Free - Heartbreaker (1973, Island Records)
- Peter Sinfield - Still (1973, Manticore Records)
- Rabbit (John "Rabbit" Bundrick) - Broken Arrows (1973, Island Records)
- Rabbit (John "Rabbit" Bundrick) - Dark Saloon (1974, Island Records)
- Back Street Crawler - Second Street (1976, Atlantic Records)

=== Compilation albums ===
- thirtysomething Soundtrack (1991, Geffen Records)
- Babylon Minstrels (1992, Hollywood Records)
- The Stand (1994, ABC Circle Music)
- My So-Called Life Soundtrack (1995, Atlantic Records)
- A Winter's Solstice VI (1997, Windham Hill Records)
- Celtic Christmas III (1997, Windham Hill Records)
- The Carols Of Christmas II (1997, Windham Hill Records)
- Summer Solstice 2 (1998, Windham Hill Records)
- Sounds Of Wood & Steel (1998, Windham Hill Records)
- Celtic Christmas IV (1998, Windham Hill Records)
- Touch – Windham Hill 25 Years of Guitar (2001, Windham Hill Records)
- A Winter's Solstice, Vol. 1: Silver Anniversary Edition (2001, Windham Hill Records)
- A Windham Hill Christmas (2002, Windham Hill Records)
- Windham Hill Chill: Ambient Acoustic (2003, Windham Hill Records)
- Windham Hill Chill 2 (2003, Windham Hill Records)
- Friday Night Lights Vol. 2 (2010)
- The West Wing (2017, Varèse Sarabande)

== Filmography ==
Year		Type	Role / notes	Source
1979	Laverne & Shirley: The Fourth Annual Shotz Talent Show	Episode	guitarist	
1987	thirtysomething	TV series	Emmy nomination	
1988	Winnie	Film	composer (score)	
1988–1993	The Wonder Years	TV series	music by, theme composer	
1989	Roe vs. Wade	TV movie	composer (score)	
1990	The Outsiders	TV series		
1990	Working Girl	TV series		
1990	Burning Bridges	Film	composer (score)	
1990	Guess Who's Coming for Christmas?	Film		
1991	The Chase	Film	composer (score)	
1991	Shoot First: A Cop's Vengeance	Film	composer (score)	
1992	Leaving Normal	Film	composer (score)	
1991–1992	I'll Fly Away	TV series	Emmy nomination	
1992	Crossroads	TV series		
1992	Wild Card	Film	composer (score)	
1992	The Jackie Thomas Show	TV series		
1992	The Good Fight	Film	composer (score)	
1993	A Place to Be Loved	Film		
1993	I'll Fly Away	TV series		
1993–1997	Roseanne	TV series	music by, theme composer	
1994	Rise and Walk: The Dennis Byrd Story	Film	music by	
1994	Tom	TV series		
1994	The Stand	miniseries	Emmy nomination	
1994	Sweet Justice	TV series		
1994–1998	Ellen	TV series	musical score	
1995	Homage	Film	composer (score)	
1994–1995	My So-Called Life	TV series	Emmy nomination	
1995	The Monroes	TV series		
1995–2004	The Drew Carey Show	TV series	music by	
1996	A Friend's Betrayal	Film		
1996	Homecoming	Film	composer (score)	
1996	Ink	TV series		
1996–1997	Relativity	TV series		
1996–1998	Early Edition	TV series	Emmy nomination	
1997	413 Hope St.	TV series		
1998	Maggie Winters	TV series	composer (score)	
1998–1999	Cupid	TV series	composer (score)	
1998–2000	Sports Night	TV series	composer (score)	
1998–2002	Felicity	TV series	Emmy nomination	
1999	Norm	TV series	composer (score)	
1999–2000	Roswell	TV series	composer (score)	
1999–2001	It's Like, You Know...	TV series	composer (score)	
1999–2001	Providence	TV series	composer (score)	
1999–2002	Once and Again	TV series	composer (score)	
2000	The $treet	TV series	composer (score)	
2001	Rock & Roll Back to School Special	Film		
2001	Three Sisters	TV series	composer (score)	
2002	George Lopez	TV series	music composer	
2002	Hidden Hills	TV series		
2003	Mister Sterling	TV series		
2003	The Brotherhood of Poland	TV series		
2003	The Lyon's Den	TV series		
2003	Boomtown	TV series		
2003	Miracles	TV series	Emmy nomination	
2005, 2008	Quarterlife	Film	music composer	
2005–2007	The War at Home	TV series	composer (score)	
2005	Surface	TV series	composer (score)	
2006	The Book of Daniel	TV series	composer (score)	
1999–2006	The West Wing	TV series	Emmy award	
2006	Huff	TV series	Emmy nomination	
2006–2007	Kidnapped	TV series	composer (score)	
2007	Heartland	TV series	composer (score)	
2006–2007	Studio 60 on the Sunset Strip	TV series	composer (score)	
2008–2009	Lipstick Jungle	TV series	composer (score)	
2008	In Plain Sight	TV series	composer (score)	
2009	A Marriage	Film	composer (score)	
2009	The Beast	TV series	composer (score)	
2009	Hawthorne	TV series	composer (score)	
2009–2010	Men of a Certain Age	TV series	composer (score)	
2010	Huge	TV series	composer (score)	
2011	In the Key of Eli	Film	composer (score)	
2011	Serving Live	Film	composer (score)	
2011	Friday Night Lights	TV series	composer (score)	
2011	A Gifted Man	TV series	composer (score)	
2012	Stetson, Street Dog of Park City	Film	composer (score)	
2013–2015	Under the Dome	TV series	music by	
2012–2013	Nashville	TV series	music by	
2014	Guilt by Association	Film	composer (score)	
2017	Seal Team	TV series	music by	
2018	Up to Snuff	Film	music by	
