= B. J. Thomas discography =

The discography for American musician B. J. Thomas includes releases from five decades, between the 1960s and the 2010s. Thomas is best remembered for his hit songs during the 1960s and 1970s, which appeared on the pop, country and Christian music charts. His popular recordings include the Burt Bacharach and Hal David song "Raindrops Keep Fallin' on My Head", the Larry Butler and Chips Moman song "(Hey Won't You Play) Another Somebody Done Somebody Wrong Song", and the original version of the Mark James song "Hooked on a Feeling".

== Albums ==
Year	Title	Peak chart positions			Label
Year	Title	US	US Country	CAN	Label
1966	I'm So Lonesome I Could Cry				Scepter Records
1966	Tomorrow Never Comes				Scepter Records
1967	Sings For Lovers And Losers				Scepter Records
1968	On My Way	133			Scepter Records
1969	Young And In Love				Scepter Records
1969	Raindrops Keep Fallin' On My Head	12		10	Scepter Records
1970	Greatest Hits Volume 1	90			Scepter Records
1970	Everybody's Out Of Town	72		71	Scepter Records
1970	Most Of All	67		44	Scepter Records
1971	Greatest Hits Volume 2	92			Scepter Records
1972	Country	209			Scepter Records
1972	Billy Joe Thomas	145			Scepter Records
1973	Songs	221			Paramount Records
1974	Longhorns & Londonbridges				Paramount Records
1975	Reunion	59	2	40	ABC Records
1975	Help Me Make It (To My Rockin' Chair)		26		ABC Records
1976	Home Where I Belong				Myrrh
1977	B. J. Thomas	114	39		MCA
1978	Happy Man				Myrrh
1978	Everybody Loves A Rain Song				MCA
1979	You Gave Me Love (When Nobody Gave Me A Prayer)				Myrrh
1980	The Best Of B. J. Thomas				Myrrh
1980	For The Best				MCA/Songbird
1980	In Concert				MCA/Songbird
1981	Amazing Grace				Myrrh
1981	Some Love Songs Never Die				MCA
1982	Miracle				Myrrh
1982	Peace In The Valley				Myrrh
1982	As We Know Him				MCA
1983	The Best Of B. J. Thomas Volume 2				Myrrh
1983	Love Shines				Priority
1983	New Looks	193	13		Columbia
1983	The Great American Dream		27		Columbia
1984	Shining		40		Columbia
1985	Throwin' Rocks At The Moon				Columbia
1985	All Is Calm, All Is Bright				Columbia
1986	Night Life				Columbia
1989	Midnight Minute				Reprise Records
1992	Back Against The Wall				Reprise Records
1993	Wind Beneath My Wings				Sony Music Special Products
1993	Still Standing Here				Silver City Records
1994	Back/Forward				DISA Records
1994	Now And Then				J & B Records
1995	I Believe				Warner Special Products
1995	Scenes Of Christmas				Cross Three Records
1995	Precious Memories				Warner Bros.
1997	I Believe				Warner Bros.
1997	Christmas Is Coming Home				Warner Resound
2000	You Call That a Mountain				Kardina Records
2001	Fireside Christmas				Sugo Music Group
2002	Greatest & Latest				Purple Pyramid Records
2003	Live				Honeyman Music
2005	The Best Of B. J. Thomas Live				Curb Records
2005	The Best Of B. J. Thomas Gospel Live				Curb Records
2005	That Christmas Feeling				Madacy
2006	We Praise: Glorify Thy Name				Braun Media
2006	We Praise: Just As I Am				Braun Media
2006	We Praise: Worship In Song				Braun Media
2007	Home For Christmas				Lifestyles
2007	Love To Burn				B. J. Thomas Music
2010	Once I Loved				Universal Music
2012	The Complete Scepter Singles				Real Gone Music
2013	The Living Room Sessions		39		Wrinkled Records
2014	O Holy Night				Wrinkled Records
2017	New Looks From An Old Lover: The Complete Columbia Singles				Real Gone Music
2021	In Remembrance. Love Songs & Lost Treasures				Real Gone Music

- ^{A}Shining also peaked at No. 17 on the RPM Country Albums chart in Canada.

== Singles ==
Note: Singles without indicated B-sides may have been only released as promotional copies with stereo and mono versions of the same song.

Year	Titles (A-side, B-side) Both sides from same album except where indicated	Peak chart positions									Album
Year	Titles (A-side, B-side) Both sides from same album except where indicated	US AC	US	US Country	US Christian (CHR)	CAN AC	CAN	CAN Country	AUS	UK	Album
1966	"I'm So Lonesome I Could Cry" b/w "Candy Baby" (from Tomorrow Never Comes)	—	8	—	—	—	2	—	—	—	I'm So Lonesome I Could Cry
1966	"Mama" b/w "Wendy"	—	22	—	—	—	12	—	—	—	I'm So Lonesome I Could Cry
1966	"Billy and Sue" b/w "Never Tell"	—	34	—	—	—	23	—	—	—	The Very Best of B. J. Thomas
1966	"Bring Back the Time" b/w "I Don't Have a Mind of My Own" (from Tomorrow Never Comes)	—	75	—	—	—	53	—	—	—	I'm So Lonesome I Could Cry
1966	"You'll Never Walk Alone" b/w "Chains of Love"	—	—	—	—	—	—	—	—	—	The Very Best of B. J. Thomas
1966	"Tomorrow Never Comes" b/w "Your Tears Leave Me Cold" (non-album track)	—	80	—	—	—	89	—	—	—	Tomorrow Never Comes
1966	"Plain Jane" b/w "My Home Town"	—	129	—	—	—	—	—	—	—	Tomorrow Never Comes
1967	"I Can't Help It (If I'm Still in Love with You)" b/w "Baby Cried" (from Tomorrow Never Comes)	—	94	—	—	—	—	—	—	—	B. J. Thomas Sings for Lovers and Losers
1967	"Treasure of Love" b/w "Just the Wisdom of a Fool"	—	—	—	—	—	—	—	—	—	B. J. Thomas Sings for Lovers and Losers
1967	"Human" b/w "Just the Wisdom of a Fool" (from B. J. Thomas Sings for Lovers and Losers)	—	—	—	—	—	—	—	—	—	non-album tracks
1967	"The Girl Can't Help It" b/w "Walkin' Back" (from Tomorrow Never Comes)	—	—	—	—	—	—	—	—	—	non-album tracks
1968	"The Eyes of a New York Woman" b/w "I May Never Get To Heaven" (non-album track)	—	28	—	—	—	29	—	—	—	On My Way
1968	"Hooked on a Feeling" b/w "I've Been Down This Road Before"	—	5	—	—	—	3	—	—	—	On My Way
1969	"It's Only Love" b/w "You Don't Love Me Anymore" (non-album track)	37	45	—	—	—	24	—	—	—	Young and in Love
1969	"Pass the Apple Eve" b/w "Fairy Tale of Time" (non-album track)	—	97	—	—	—	78	—	—	—	Young and in Love
1969	"Skip a Rope" b/w "You Don't Love Me Anymore" (non-album track)	—	—	—	—	—	—	—	—	—	Young and in Love
1969	"Raindrops Keep Fallin' on My Head" b/w "Never Had It So Good" (from Young and in Love)	1	1	—	—	1	1	—	29	38	Raindrops Keep Fallin' on My Head
1970	"Everybody's Out of Town" b/w "Living Again" (from Young and in Love)	3	26	—	—	—	18	—	21	—	Everybody's Out of Town
1970	"I Just Can't Help Believing" b/w "Send My Picture To Scranton, PA"	1	9	—	—	—	18	—	31	—	Everybody's Out of Town
1970	"Most of All" b/w "The Mask" (from Everybody's Out of Town)	2	38	—	—	13	20	—	98	—	Most of All
1971	"No Love at All" (cover) b/w "Have a Heart" (non-album track)	4	16	—	—	12	16	—	96	—	Most of All
1971	"Mighty Clouds of Joy" b/w "Life"	8	34	—	—	25	26	—	—	—	Greatest Hits Volume Two
1971	"Long Ago Tomorrow" b/w "Burnin' a Hole in My Mind" (non-album track)	13	61	—	—	—	57	—	—	—	Greatest Hits Volume Two
1972	"Rock and Roll Lullaby" b/w "Are We Losing Touch"	1	15	—	—	8	7	—	41	—	Billy Joe Thomas
1972	"That's What Friends Are for" b/w "I Get Enthused"	38	74	—	—	—	—	—	—	—	Billy Joe Thomas
1972	"Happier Than the Morning Sun" b/w "We Have Got to Get Our Ship Together"	31	100	—	—	—	—	—	—	—	Billy Joe Thomas
1973	"Sweet Cherry Wine" b/w "Roads"	—	—	—	—	—	—	—	—	—	Billy Joe Thomas
1973	"Songs" b/w "Goodbye's a Long, Long, Time"	41	—	—	—	—	—	—	—	—	Songs
1973	"Early Morning Hush" b/w "Sunday Sunrise"	—	—	—	—	—	—	—	—	—	Songs
1974	"Play Something Sweet" b/w "Talkin' Confidentially" (from Songs)	—	—	—	—	—	—	—	—	—	Longhorns & Londonbridges
1975	"(Hey Won't You Play) Another Somebody Done Somebody Wrong Song" b/w "City Boys"	1	1	1	—	1	3	2	10	—	Reunion
1975	"Help Me Make It (To My Rockin' Chair)" b/w "We Are Happy Together"	5	64	37	—	9	67	—	—	—	Help Me Make It (To My Rockin' Chair)
1977	"Home Where I Belong" b/w "Hallelujah"	—	—	98	21	—	—	—	—	—	Home Where I Belong
1977	"Without a Doubt"; B-side unknown	—	—	—	—	—	—	—	—	—	Home Where I Belong
1977	"Don't Worry Baby" b/w "My Love"	2	17	—	—	1	12	—	—	—	B. J. Thomas
1977	"Still The Lovin' Is Fun" b/w "Play Me a Little Traveling Music"	8	77	—	—	13	86	—	—	—	B. J. Thomas
1978	"I Want To Be More Like Jesus"; B-side unknown	—	—	—	—	—	—	—	—	—	Happy Man
1978	"Everybody Loves a Rain Song" b/w "Dusty Roads"	2	43	25	—	11	43	34	—	—	Everybody Loves A Rain Song
1978	"Sweet Young America" b/w "Aloha"	—	—	—	—	—	—	—	—	—	Everybody Loves A Rain Song
1979	"We Could Have Been the Closest of Friends" b/w "In My Heart"	—	—	86	—	—	—	—	—	—	non-album tracks
1979	"God Bless the Children" b/w "On This Christmas Night"	38	—	—	—	—	—	—	—	—	On This Christmas Night (Various artists)
1979	"Happy Man"	—	—	—	5	—	—	—	—	—	Happy Man
1979	"What a Difference You've Made"	—	—	—	6	—	—	—	—	—	Happy Man
1979	"He's Got It All in Control"	—	—	—	18	—	—	—	—	—	Happy Man
1979	"From the Start"; B-side of the above four tracks unknown	—	—	—	20	—	—	—	—	—	Happy Man
1980	"Jesus on My Mind" b/w "Using Things and Loving People"	—	—	—	1	—	—	—	—	—	You Gave Me Love (When Nobody Gave Me a Prayer)
1980	"The Faith of a Little Child"; B-side unknown	—	—	—	7	—	—	—	—	—	You Gave Me Love (When Nobody Gave Me a Prayer)
1980	"Walkin' on a Cloud"	30	—	—	—	—	—	—	—	—	For the Best
1980	"Nothin' Could Be Better"	—	—	—	19	—	—	—	—	—	For the Best
1980	"Everything Always Works Out for the Best" b/w "No Limit"	—	—	—	10	—	—	—	—	—	For the Best
1981	"Uncloudy Day" b/w "Amazing Grace"	—	—	—	—	—	—	—	—	—	Amazing Grace
1981	"Some Love Songs Never Die" b/w "There Ain't No Love"	34	—	27	—	—	—	—	—	—	Some Love Songs Never Die
1981	"I Recall a Gypsy Woman" b/w "The Lovin' Kind"	—	—	22	—	—	—	47	—	—	Some Love Songs Never Die
1982	"Satan, You're a Liar"; B-side unknown	—	—	—	6	—	—	—	—	—	Miracle
1982	"But Love Me" b/w "I Really Got the Feeling"	27	—	—	—	—	—	—	—	—	As We Know Him
1982	"I'm in Tune (Finding How Good Life Can Be)"	—	—	—	—	—	—	—	—	—	Miracle
1983	"Whatever Happened to Old-Fashioned Love" b/w "I Just Sing"	13	93	1	—	—	—	1	39	—	New Looks
1983	"New Looks from an Old Lover" b/w "You Keep the Man in Me Happy"	—	—	1	—	—	—	6	—	—	New Looks
1983	"Pray for Me"; B-side unknown	—	—	—	4	—	—	—	—	—	Love Shines
1983	"Two Car Garage" b/w "Beautiful World"	44	—	3	—	—	—	1	91	—	The Great American Dream
1984	"Odessa Beggarman"	—	—	—	35	—	—	—	—	—	The Best of B. J. Thomas Volume II
1984	"The Whole World's in Love When You're Lonely" b/w "We're Here to Love"	—	—	10	—	—	—	15	—	—	Shining
1984	"The Girl Most Likely To" b/w "From This Moment On"	—	—	17	—	—	—	5	—	—	Shining
1985	"The Part of Me That Needs You Most" b/w "Northern Lights"	—	—	61	—	—	—	57	—	—	Throwin' Rocks at the Moon
1986	"America Is" b/w "Broken Toys"	—	—	62	—	—	—	—	—	—	Throwin' Rocks at the Moon
1986	"Night Life" b/w "Make the World Go Away"	—	—	59	—	—	—	—	—	—	Night Life
1988	"As Long As We Got Each Other" (with Dusty Springfield)	7	—	—	—	—	—	—	—	—	Midnight Minute
1989	"Don't Leave Love (Out There All Alone)" b/w "One Woman"	39	—	—	—	—	—	—	—	—	Midnight Minute
2000	"You Call That a Mountain"	—	—	66	—	—	—	—	—	—	You Call That a Mountain
2013	"I Just Can't Help Believing" (with Vince Gill)	—	—	—	—	—	—	—	—	—	The Living Room Sessions
2017	"We Are Houston" (with The Music Row Choir)	—	—	—	—	—	—	—	—	—	—

=== Guest singles ===
Year	Single	Artist	Chart positions		Album
Year	Single	Artist	US Country	CAN Country	Album
1984	"Rock and Roll Shoes"	Ray Charles	14	15	Friendship

== Music videos ==
Year	Video
1983	"Two Car Garage"
1992	"A Southern Girl on a Summer Night"
2000	"What's Forever For?"

== Other album appearances ==
- "Hallowed Be Thy Name" from The Lord's Prayer (1980)
- "Suspicious Minds" from Remembering Elvis: Louisiana Hayrides & Tribute (1999)
- "Let There Be Peace on Earth" from Inspirations – George Foreman (2003)
- "Tomorrow Never Comes" from Ernest Tubb's Special Guests (2004)
- "Raindrops Keep Falling on My Head" from Good Times Again – Glen Campbell (2007)
- "Raindrops Keep Falling on My Head" from Even More One Hit Wonders – Lynn Anderson (2008)
- "100% Chance of Pain" from Partners, Vol. 2 – T.G. Sheppard (2012)
- "Sunny" from Duets with My American Idols – Oleg Frish (2014)
