= List of awards and nominations received by Burt Bacharach =

Burt Bacharach awards and nominations
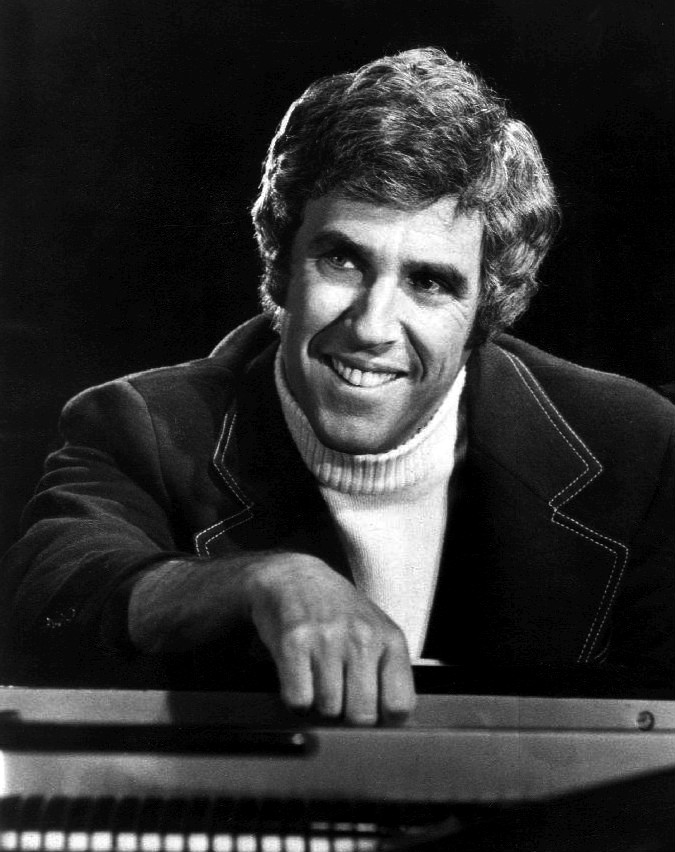
Bacharach in 1972
Awards and nominations
Award	Wins	Nominations
Totals
Academy Awards	3	6
British Academy Film Awards	1	2
Drama Desk Awards	1	1
Golden Globe Awards	2	7
Grammy Awards	6	22
Hollywood Music in Media Awards	0	1
Primetime Emmy Awards	1	3
Satellite Awards	0	2
Tony Awards	0	1
Wins	14
Nominations	45

Burt Bacharach was an American composer, songwriter, record producer, and pianist who is widely regarded as one of the most important and influential figures of 20th-century popular music.

He had received three Academy Awards, two Golden Globe Awards, six Grammy Awards, a Primetime Emmy Award, a BAFTA Award, and a Drama Desk Award. He was also nominated for a Tony Award.

== Major awards ==
=== Academy Awards ===
Year	Category	Nominated work	Result	Ref.
1965	Best Song	"What's New Pussycat?" (from What's New Pussycat?) (shared with Hal David)	Nominated	
1966	Best Song	"Alfie" (from Alfie) (shared with Hal David)	Nominated	
1967	Best Song	"The Look of Love" (from Casino Royale) (shared with Hal David)	Nominated	
1969	Best Original Score for a Motion Picture (Not a Musical)	Butch Cassidy and the Sundance Kid	Won	
1969	Best Song – Original for the Picture	"Raindrops Keep Fallin' On My Head" (from Butch Cassidy and the Sundance Kid) (shared with Hal David)	Won	
1981	Best Original Song	"Arthur's Theme (Best That You Can Do)" (from Arthur) (shared with Carole Bayer Sager, Christopher Cross, and Peter Allen)	Won	

=== British Academy Film Awards ===
Year	Category	Nominated work	Result	Ref.
1970	Anthony Asquith Memorial Award	Butch Cassidy and the Sundance Kid	Won	
1981	Best Original Film Music	Arthur	Nominated	

=== Golden Globe Awards ===
Year	Category	Nominated work	Result	Ref.
1966	Best Original Song	"Alfie" (from Alfie) (shared with Hal David)	Nominated	
1969	Best Original Score	Butch Cassidy and the Sundance Kid	Won	
1969	Best Original Song	"Raindrops Keep Fallin' On My Head" (from Butch Cassidy and the Sundance Kid) (shared with Hal David)	Nominated	
1971	Best Original Song	"Long Ago Tomorrow" (from The Raging Moon) (shared with Hal David)	Nominated	
1981	Best Original Song	"Arthur's Theme (Best That You Can Do)" (from Arthur) (shared with Carole Bayer Sager, Christopher Cross, and Peter Allen)	Won	
1982	Best Original Song	"Making Love" (from Making Love) (shared with Bruce Roberts and Carole Bayer Sager)	Nominated	
1986	Best Original Song	"They Don't Make Them Like They Used To" (from Tough Guys) (shared with Carole Bayer Sager)	Nominated	

=== Grammy Awards ===
Year	Category	Nominated work	Result	Ref.
1963	Song of the Year	"Wives and Lovers" (shared with Hal David)	Nominated	
1965	Best Arrangement Accompanying a Vocalist or Instrumentalist	"What the World Needs Now Is Love" (shared with Jackie DeShannon)	Nominated	
1967	Best Instrumental Theme	"Casino Royale" (shared with Hal David)	Nominated	
1967	Best Instrumental Arrangement	"Alfie"	Won	
1967	Best Instrumental Arrangement	"Casino Royale"	Nominated	
1967	Best Original Score Written for a Motion Picture or a Television Show	Casino Royale	Nominated	
1969	Song of the Year	"I'll Never Fall in Love Again" (shared with Hal David)	Nominated	
1969	Song of the Year	"Raindrops Keep Fallin' On My Head" (shared with Hal David)	Nominated	
1969	Best Contemporary Song	"Raindrops Keep Fallin' On My Head" (shared with Hal David)	Nominated	
1969	Best Original Score Written for a Motion Picture or a Television Special	Butch Cassidy and the Sundance Kid	Won	
1969	Best Score from an Original Cast Show Album	Promises, Promises (shared with Hal David, Henry Jerome, and Phil Ramone)	Won	
1971	Best Arrangement Accompanying Vocalist(s)	"Long Ago Tomorrow" (shared with Patrick Williams)	Nominated	
1971	Best Pop Instrumental Performance	Burt Bacharach	Nominated	
1981	Song of the Year	"Arthur's Theme (Best That You Can Do)" (shared with Carole Bayer Sager, Christopher Cross, and Peter Allen)	Nominated	
1986	Song of the Year	"That's What Friends Are For" (shared with Carole Bayer Sager)	Won	
1986	Record of the Year	"That's What Friends Are For" (shared with Carole Bayer Sager)	Nominated	
1996	Best Pop Collaboration with Vocals	"God Give Me Strength" (shared with Elvis Costello)	Nominated	
1998	Best Pop Collaboration with Vocals	"I Still Have That Other Girl" (shared with Elvis Costello)	Won	
2005	Best Pop Instrumental Performance	"In Our Time" (shared with Chris Botti)	Nominated	
2005	Best Contemporary Instrumental Album	At This Time (shared with Allen Sides)	Won	
2020	Best Traditional Pop Vocal Album	Blue Umbrella (shared with Daniel Tashian)	Nominated	
2021	Best Musical Theater Album	Burt Bacharach and Steven Sater's Some Lovers (shared with Michael Croiter, Ben Hartman, Cody Lassen, and Steven Sater)	Nominated	

=== Primetime Emmy Awards ===
Year	Category	Nominated work	Result	Ref.
1970	Outstanding Variety or Musical Program – Variety and Popular Music	Kraft Music Hall (Episode: "The Sound of Burt Bacharach")	Nominated	
1971	Outstanding Single Program – Variety or Musical – Variety and Popular Music	Another Evening with Burt Bacharach	Nominated	
1971	Outstanding Single Program – Variety or Musical – Variety and Popular Music	Singer Presents Burt Bacharach	Won	

=== Tony Awards ===
Year	Category	Nominated work	Result	Ref.
1969	Best Musical	Promises, Promises (shared with Neil Simon, Hal David, and David Merrick)	Nominated	

== Miscellaneous awards ==
=== Drama Desk Awards ===
Year	Category	Nominated work	Result	Ref.
1969	Outstanding Music	Promises, Promises	Won (Note: Tied with Al Carmines for Peace.)	

=== Hollywood Music in Media Awards ===
Year	Category	Nominated work	Result	Ref.
2016	Best Original Song – Feature Film	"Dancing with Your Shadow" (from A Boy Called Po)	Nominated	

=== Satellite Awards ===
Year	Category	Nominated work	Result	Ref.
1996	Best Original Song	"God Give Me Strength" (from Grace of My Heart) (shared with Elvis Costello)	Nominated	
2016	Best Original Song	"Dancing with Your Shadow" (from A Boy Called Po) (shared with Billy Mann)	Nominated	

== Special honors ==
The success of [Burt Bacharach and Hal David]'s creative genius continues today as they each add new songs to what is without question one of the richest and most recognizable multi-generational playlists known to the world. Their creative talents have inspired songwriters for more than five decades, and their legacy is much in the tradition of George and Ira Gershwin, for whom this award is named.

— Librarian of Congress, James H. Billington, 2011
- 1972, Songwriters Hall of Fame.
- 1997, Grammy Trustees Award, with Hal David.
- 1997, subject of a PBS "Great Performances" biography, "Burt Bacharach: This is Now".
- 2000, People magazine named him one of the "Sexiest Men Alive", and one of the "50 Most Beautiful People" in 1999.
- 2001, Polar Music Prize, presented in Stockholm by His Majesty King Carl XVI Gustaf of Sweden.
- 2002, National Academy Of Recording Arts and Sciences (NARAS) New York Heroes Award.
- 2005, GQ Magazine Inspiration Award.
- 2006, George and Ira Gershwin Award for Musical Achievement from UCLA.
- 2006, Thornton Legacy Award, University of Southern California; also created the Burt Bacharach Music Scholarship at the Thornton School to support outstanding young musicians.
- 2008, Grammy Lifetime Achievement Award.
- 2009, Bacharach received an honorary Doctorate of Music from Berklee College of Music. The award was presented to him during the Great American Songbook concert, which paid tribute to his music.
- 2012, Gershwin Prize for Popular Song, with Hal David, awarded by the Library of Congress.
