= List of songs written by Burt Bacharach =

This is a list of songs written by Burt Bacharach.

== Chart hits and other notable songs written by Burt Bacharach ==
Year	Song	Original artist	Co-writer(s) with Bacharach	^{U.S. Pop}	^{UK Singles Chart}	Other charting versions, and notes
1952	"Once in a Blue Moon"	Nat King Cole	-	-	-	His first professionally written song; adapted from a melody by Anton Rubinstein
1957	"The Story of My Life"	Marty Robbins	Hal David	15	-	1958: Michael Holliday, #1 UK; 1958: Gary Miller, #14 UK; 1958: Dave King, #20 UK; 1958: Alma Cogan, #25 UK
1958	"Magic Moments"	Perry Como	Hal David	4	1	1958: Ronnie Hilton, #22 UK
1958	"Wendy Wendy"	The Four Coins		72	-	
1958	"The Blob"	The Five Blobs	Mack David	33	-	
1959	"Crazy Times"	Gene Vincent	Paul Hampton	-	-	
1959	"Heavenly"	Johnny Mathis	Sydney Shaw	-	-	Title track of #1 album
1959	"With Open Arms"	Jane Morgan	Hal David	39	-	
1960	"I Looked for You"	Charlie Gracie	Hal David	-	-	
1960	"We're Only Young Once"	The Avons	Robert Colby	-	45	
1961	"Gotta Get a Girl"	Frankie Avalon	Hal David	-	-	
1961	"Mexican Divorce"	The Drifters	Bob Hilliard	-	-	
1961	"Please Stay"	The Drifters	Bob Hilliard	14	-	1966: The Cryin' Shames, #26 UK; 2001: Mekon ft. Marc Almond, #91 UK
1961	"I Wake Up Crying"	Chuck Jackson	Hal David	59	-	
1961	"Tower of Strength"	Gene McDaniels	Bob Hilliard	5	-	1961: Frankie Vaughan, #1 UK
1961	"You're Following Me"	Perry Como	Bob Hilliard	92	-	
1961	"Three Wheels on My Wagon"	Dick Van Dyke	Bob Hilliard	-	-	
1961	"Baby It's You"	The Shirelles	Mack David, Luther Dixon	8	-	1964: Dave Berry, #23 UK; 1969: Smith, #5 pop 1995: The Beatles (live), #67 pop, #7 UK
1961	"You Don't Have to Be a Tower of Strength"	Gloria Lynne	Hal David	100	-	
1962	"Another Tear Falls"	Gene McDaniels	Hal David	-	-	1966: The Walker Brothers, #12 UK
1962	"Any Day Now (My Wild Beautiful Bird)"	Chuck Jackson	Bob Hilliard	23	-	1969: Percy Sledge, #86 pop 1982: Ronnie Milsap, #1 country and #14 pop
1962	"(The Man Who Shot) Liberty Valance"	Gene Pitney	Hal David	4	-	
1962	"I Just Don't Know What to Do with Myself"	Tommy Hunt	Hal David	-	-	1964: Dusty Springfield, #3 UK; 1966: Dionne Warwick, #26 pop 1970: Gary Puckett, #61 pop 2003: The White Stripes, #13 UK
1962	"(It's) Wonderful to Be Young"	Cliff Richard	Hal David	-	-	
1962	"Make It Easy on Yourself"	Jerry Butler	Hal David	20	-	1965: The Walker Brothers, #16 pop, #1 UK; 1970: Dionne Warwick, #37 US
1962	"Don't You Believe It"	Andy Williams	Bob Hilliard	39	-	
1962	"Only Love Can Break a Heart"	Gene Pitney	Hal David	2	-	1967: Margaret Whiting, #96 pop 1977: Bobby Vinton, #99 pop
1962	"Keep Away from Other Girls"	Helen Shapiro	Bob Hilliard	-	40	
1962	"(There Goes) The Forgotten Man"	Jimmy Radcliffe	Hal David	-	-	
1962	"The Love of a Boy"	Timi Yuro	Hal David	44	-	
1962	"Don't Make Me Over"	Dionne Warwick	Hal David	21	-	1966: The Swinging Blue Jeans, #31 UK; 1970: Brenda & the Tabulations, #77 pop 1979: Jennifer Warnes, #67 pop 1989: Sybil, #20 pop, #19 UK
1963	"This Empty Place"	Dionne Warwick	Hal David	84	-	
1963	"Wishin' and Hopin'"	Dionne Warwick	Hal David	-	-	1964: Dusty Springfield, #6 pop 1964: The Merseybeats, #13 UK
1963	"Blue on Blue"	Bobby Vinton	Hal David	3	-	
1963	"Be True to Yourself"	Bobby Vee	Hal David	34	-	
1963	"True Love Never Runs Smooth"	Gene Pitney	Hal David	21	-	
1963	"In the Land of Make Believe"	The Drifters	Hal David	-	-	
1963	"Saturday Sunshine"	Burt Bacharach	Hal David	93	-	
1963	"Make the Music Play"	Dionne Warwick	Hal David	81	-	
1963	"Blue Guitar"	Richard Chamberlain	Hal David	42	-	
1963	"(They Long to Be) Close to You"	Richard Chamberlain	Hal David	-	-	1970: The Carpenters, #1 pop, #6 UK; 1972: Jerry Butler featuring Brenda Lee Eager, #91 pop 1976: B. T. Express, #82 pop 1986: Gwen Guthrie, #25 UK; 1990: The Carpenters, #25 UK (reissue)
1963	"Reach Out for Me"	Lou Johnson	Hal David	74	-	1964: Dionne Warwick, #20 pop, #23 UK
1963	"Twenty Four Hours from Tulsa"	Gene Pitney	Hal David	17	5	
1963	"Wives and Lovers"	Jack Jones	Hal David	14	-	
1963	"Anyone Who Had a Heart"	Dionne Warwick	Hal David	8	42	1964: Cilla Black, #1 UK; 2008: Atomic Kitten, #77 UK; 2015: Cilla Black, #41 UK
1964	"Send Me No Flowers"	Doris Day	Hal David	-	-	
1964	"Any Old Time of the Day"	Dionne Warwick	Hal David	-	-	
1964	"Who's Been Sleeping in My Bed"	Linda Scott	Hal David	100	-	
1964	"Walk On By"	Dionne Warwick	Hal David	6	9	1969: Isaac Hayes, #30 pop 1975: Gloria Gaynor, #98 US; 1978: The Stranglers, #21 UK; 1979: AWB, #92 pop, #46 UK; 1982: D Train, #44 UK; 1989: Dina Carroll, #95 UK; 1990: Sybil, #74 pop, #6 UK; 1997: Gabrielle, #7 UK; 1989: Melissa Manchester, #9 Adult Contemporary
1964	"A House Is Not a Home"	Dionne Warwick	Hal David	71	-	1964: Brook Benton, #75 pop 2010: The Glee Cast, #53 pop, #77 UK
1964	"You'll Never Get to Heaven (If You Break My Heart)"	Dionne Warwick	Hal David	34	20	1973: The Stylistics, #23 pop
1964	"Me Japanese Boy I Love You"	Bobby Goldsboro	Hal David	74	-	
1964	"(There's) Always Something There to Remind Me"	Lou Johnson	Hal David	49	-	1964: Sandie Shaw, #1 UK; 1968: Dionne Warwick, #65 pop 1968: Jose Feliciano; 1970: R. B. Greaves, #27 pop 1983: Naked Eyes, #8 pop, #59 UK; 1994: Sandie Shaw, #66 UK (reissue); 1995: Tin Tin Out, #14 UK
1964	"A Message to Martha (Kentucky Bluebird)"	Lou Johnson	Hal David	-	36	1962: Jerry Butler; 1964: Adam Faith, #12 UK; 1966: Dionne Warwick, "Message to Michael", #8 pop
1964	"Rome Will Never Leave You"	Richard Chamberlain	Hal David	99	-	
1965	"Don't Go Breaking My Heart"	Dionne Warwick	Hal David	-	-	
1965	"Long After Tonight Is All Over"	Jimmy Radcliffe	Hal David	-	40	
1965	"Trains and Boats and Planes"	Burt Bacharach	Hal David	-	4	1965: Billy J. Kramer and the Dakotas, #47 pop, #12 UK; 1966: Dionne Warwick, #22 pop
1965	"What the World Needs Now Is Love"	Jackie DeShannon	Hal David	7	-	1971: Tom Clay, #8 pop 1998: Dionne Warwick & the Hip-Hop Nation United, #87 pop
1965	"What's New Pussycat?"	Tom Jones	Hal David	3	11	
1965	"My Little Red Book"	Manfred Mann	Hal David	-	-	1966: Love, #52 pop
1965	"Here I Am"	Dionne Warwick	Hal David	65	-	
1965	"A Lifetime of Loneliness"	Jackie DeShannon	Hal David	66	-	
1965	"Looking with My Eyes"	Dionne Warwick	Hal David	64	-	
1965	"Are You There (With Another Girl)"	Dionne Warwick	Hal David	39	-	
1966	"Alfie"	Cilla Black	Hal David	95	9	1966: Cher, #32 pop 1967: Dionne Warwick, #15 pop 1968: Eivets Rednow, #66 pop 2004: Alison Moyet, #99 UK
1966	"Come and Get Me"	Jackie DeShannon	Hal David	83	-	
1966	"Another Night"	Dionne Warwick	Hal David	49	-	
1966	"Go with Love"	Dionne Warwick	Hal David	-	-	
1966	"Nikki"	Burt Bacharach	Hal David	-	-	
1966	"Promise Her Anything"	Tom Jones	Hal David	74	-	
1966	"So Long Johnny"	Jackie DeShannon	Hal David	-	-	
1967	"The Beginning of Loneliness"	Dionne Warwick	Hal David	79	-	
1967	"Casino Royale"	Herb Alpert & The Tijuana Brass		27	27	
1967	"The Look of Love"	Dusty Springfield	Hal David	22	-	1968: Sérgio Mendes, #4 pop 1971: Isaac Hayes, #79 pop 1973: Gladys Knight & the Pips, #21 UK; 1996: T-Empo, #71 UK; 2001: Diana Krall, #22 Adult Contemporary
1967	"The Windows of the World"	Dionne Warwick	Hal David	32	-	
1967	"I Say a Little Prayer"	Dionne Warwick	Hal David	4	-	1968: Aretha Franklin, #10 pop, #4 UK; 1971: Glen Campbell and Anne Murray, #81 pop 1988: Bomb the Bass, #10 UK; 1997: Diana King, #38 pop, #17 UK
1967	"One Less Bell to Answer"	Keely Smith	Hal David	-	-	1970: The 5th Dimension, #2 pop
1968	"Knowing When to Leave"	Sue Raney	Hal David	-	-	
1968	"Do You Know the Way to San Jose"	Dionne Warwick	Hal David	10	8	
1968	"This Guy's in Love with You"	Herb Alpert	Hal David	1	3	1969: Dionne Warwick, "This Girl's in Love with You", #7 pop
1968	"Let Me Be Lonely"	Dionne Warwick	Hal David	71	-	
1968	"Who Is Gonna Love Me?"	Dionne Warwick	Hal David	33	56	
1968	"To Wait for Love"	Herb Alpert	Hal David	51	-	1964: Tony Orlando
1968	"Promises, Promises"	Dionne Warwick	Hal David	19	-	
1969	"The April Fools"	Dionne Warwick	Hal David	37	-	
1969	"I'll Never Fall in Love Again"	Burt Bacharach	Hal David	93	-	1969: Bobbie Gentry, #1 UK; 1969: Dionne Warwick, #6 pop 1990: Deacon Blue (on Four Bacharach & David Songs), #2 UK
1969	"Odds and Ends"	Dionne Warwick	Hal David	43	-	
1969	"I'm a Better Man (For Having Loved You)"	Engelbert Humperdinck	Hal David	38	15	
1969	"Raindrops Keep Fallin' on My Head"	B. J. Thomas	Hal David	1	38	1970: Johnny (John) Farnham, #1 Australia (7 weeks); 1970: Sacha Distel, #10 UK; 1970: Bobbie Gentry, #40 UK
1970	"Everybody's Out of Town"	B. J. Thomas	Hal David	26	-	
1970	"Let Me Go to Him"	Dionne Warwick	Hal David	32	-	
1970	"Paper Mache"	Dionne Warwick	Hal David	43	-	
1970	"The Wine Is Young"	Dionne Warwick	Hal David	-	-	1970 - B side to Paper Mache
1970	"The Green Grass Starts to Grow"	Dionne Warwick	Hal David	43	-	
1971	"All Kinds of People"	Dionne Warwick	Hal David	-	-	
1971	"Who Gets the Guy"	Dionne Warwick	Hal David	57	-	
1971	"Long Ago Tomorrow"	B. J. Thomas	Hal David	61	-	
1973	"Living Together, Growing Together"	The 5th Dimension	Hal David	32	-	
1973	"Lost Horizon"	Shawn Phillips	Hal David	63	-	
1980	"I Don't Need You Anymore"	Jackie DeShannon	Paul Anka	86	-	
1981	"Stronger Than Before"	Carole Bayer Sager	Bruce Roberts, Carole Bayer Sager	30	-	
1981	"Arthur's Theme (Best That You Can Do)"	Christopher Cross	Christopher Cross, Carole Bayer Sager, Peter Allen	1	7	
1981	"Making Love"	Roberta Flack	Bruce Roberts, Carole Bayer Sager	13	-	
1982	"Night Shift"	Quarterflash	Carole Bayer Sager, Marvin Ross	60	-	
1982	"Heartlight"	Neil Diamond	Carole Bayer Sager, Neil Diamond	5	47	
1982	"That's What Friends Are For"	Rod Stewart	Carole Bayer Sager	-	-	1985: Dionne Warwick and Friends (Stevie Wonder, Elton John and Gladys Knight), #1 US pop, #1 R&B, #16 UK
1983	"Front Page Story"	Neil Diamond	Carole Bayer Sager, Neil Diamond	65	-	
1984	"A Chance for Heaven"	Christopher Cross	Carole Bayer Sager, Christopher Cross	76	-	
1984	"Turn Around"	Neil Diamond	Carole Bayer Sager, Neil Diamond	62	-	
1986	"On My Own"	Patti LaBelle and Michael McDonald	Carole Bayer Sager	1	2	
1986	"Love Always"	El DeBarge	Bruce Roberts, Carole Bayer Sager	43	-	
1987	"Love Power"	Dionne Warwick and Jeffrey Osborne	Carole Bayer Sager	12	63	
1987	"Over You"	Ray Parker Jr.	Carole Bayer Sager, Ray Parker Jr.	-	65	
1994	"Don't Say Goodbye Girl"	Tevin Campbell	Sally Jo Dakota, Narada Michael Walden	71	-	
1998	"Toledo"	Elvis Costello	Elvis Costello	-	72	
2000	"Nothing in This World"	Engelbert Humperdinck	N Lowis	-	-	
2003	"Beginnings"	Cilla Black	Hal David	-	-	
