= List of number-one hits of 1970 (Mexico) =

This is a list of the songs that reached number one in Mexico in 1970, according to Billboard magazine with data provided by Radio Mil. Also included are the number-one songs according to the Record World magazine.

== Chart history (Billboard) ==
Issue date	Song	Artist(s)	Label	Ref.
January 17	"Sugar, Sugar"	The Archies	RCA	
January 24	"Sugar, Sugar"	The Archies	RCA	
January 31	"Sugar, Sugar"	The Archies	RCA	
February 7	"Sugar, Sugar"	The Archies	RCA	
February 14	"Sugar, Sugar"	The Archies	RCA	
February 21	"La nave del olvido"	José José	RCA	
February 28	"La nave del olvido"	José José	RCA	
March 7	"La nave del olvido"	José José	RCA	
March 14	"La nave del olvido"	José José	RCA	
March 21	"La nave del olvido"	José José	RCA	
March 28	"La nave del olvido"	José José	RCA	
April 4	"La nave del olvido"	José José	RCA	
April 11	"La nave del olvido"	José José	RCA	
April 18	"La nave del olvido"	José José	RCA	
April 25	"El triste"	José José	RCA	
May 2	"El triste"	José José	RCA	
May 9	"El triste"	José José	RCA	
May 16	"El triste"	José José	RCA	
May 23	"El triste"	José José	RCA	
May 30	"El triste"	José José	RCA	
June 13	"Cotton Fields"	Creedence Clearwater Revival	Liberty	
June 20	"Cotton Fields"	Creedence Clearwater Revival	Liberty	
June 27	"Cotton Fields"	Creedence Clearwater Revival	Liberty	
July 4	"Cotton Fields"	Creedence Clearwater Revival	Liberty	
July 11	"Raindrops Keep Fallin' on My Head"	B.J. Thomas	Orfeón	
July 18	"Raindrops Keep Fallin' on My Head"	B.J. Thomas	Orfeón	
July 25	"Raindrops Keep Fallin' on My Head"	B.J. Thomas	Orfeón	
August 1	"Raindrops Keep Fallin' on My Head"	B.J. Thomas	Orfeón	
August 8	"Raindrops Keep Fallin' on My Head"	B.J. Thomas	Orfeón	
August 15	"Raindrops Keep Fallin' on My Head"	B.J. Thomas	Orfeón	
August 22	"Raindrops Keep Fallin' on My Head"	B.J. Thomas	Orfeón	
August 29	"Run to Her"	The Beeds	Buddah	
September 5	"Raindrops Keep Fallin' on My Head"	B.J. Thomas	Orfeón	
September 12	"Raindrops Keep Fallin' on My Head"	B.J. Thomas	Orfeón	
September 19	"In the Summertime"	Mungo Jerry	Gamma	
September 26	"In the Summertime"	Mungo Jerry	Gamma	
October 3	"In the Summertime"	Mungo Jerry	Gamma	
October 10	"In the Summertime"	Mungo Jerry	Gamma	
October 17	"In the Summertime"	Mungo Jerry	Gamma	
October 31	"In the Summertime"	Mungo Jerry	Gamma	
November 7	"In the Summertime"	Mungo Jerry	Gamma	
November 14	"In the Summertime"	Mungo Jerry	Gamma	
November 21	"Y volveré"	Los Ángeles Negros	Capitol	
November 28	"Y volveré"	Los Ángeles Negros	Capitol	
December 5	"Y volveré"	Los Ángeles Negros	Capitol	
December 19	"Y volveré"	Los Ángeles Negros	Capitol	

=== By country of origin ===
Number-one artists:

Country of origin	Number of artists	Artists
United States	4	The Archies
United States	4	The Beeds
United States	4	B.J. Thomas
United States	4	Creedence Clearwater Revival
Chile	1	Los Ángeles Negros
Mexico	1	José José
United Kingdom	1	Mungo Jerry

Number-one compositions (it denotes the country of origin of the song's composer[s]; in case the song is a cover of another one, the name of the original composition is provided in parentheses):

Country of origin	Number of compositions	Compositions
United States	4	"Cotton Fields"
United States	4	"Raindrops Keep Fallin' on My Head"
United States	4	"Run to Her"
United States	4	"Sugar, Sugar"
Argentina	1	"La nave del olvido"
France	1	"Y volveré" ("Emporte-moi")
Mexico	1	"El triste"
United Kingdom	1	"In the Summertime"

== Chart history (Record World) ==
Issue date	Song	Artist(s)	Ref.
March 21	"Je t'aime... moi non plus"	Ray Conniff	
March 28	"La nave del olvido"	José José/Trío Los Pinguinos	
April 4	"Je t'aime... moi non plus"	Ray Conniff	
April 18	"El triste"	José José	
May 26	"El triste"	José José	
December 12	"Sufrir"	Los Solitarios	

== See also ==
- 1970 in music

== Sources ==
- Print editions of the Billboard magazine from January 17, 1970, to December 19, 1970.
