= Love Shines =

Love Shines may refer to:

- Love Shines (film), a 2010 documentary film about Canadian songwriter Ron Sexsmith
- Love Shines (album), a 1983 album by American singer B. J. Thomas
- "Love Shines" (song), a 1992 song by Fleetwood Mac
- "Love Shines (A Song for My Daughters about God)", a 2006 song by Live from Songs from Black Mountain
