= You Gave Me Love (When Nobody Gave Me a Prayer) =

Studio album by B. J. Thomas
- Released: 1979
- Studio: Glaser Sound (Nashville, Tennessee)
- Genre: Gospel, Contemporary Christian
- Producer: Archie P. Jordan

B. J. Thomas chronology
Happy Man (1979)	You Gave Me Love (When Nobody Gave Me a Prayer) (1979)	The Best of B.J. Thomas (1980)

You Gave Me Love (When Nobody Gave Me a Prayer) is the twenty-first studio album and third gospel album by American singer B. J. Thomas, released in 1979.

== Track listing ==
1. "Using Things and Loving People" (Hal David, Archie P. Jordan) - 3:27
2. "Jesus on My Mind" (Jerry Gillespie) - 3:18
3. "You Gave Me Love" (Archie P. Jordan, Claire Cloninger) - 3:26
4. "The Faith of a Little Child" (Donna McLaughlin) - 4:20
5. "I'm Gonna See Jesus" (Archie P. Jordan) - 2:45
6. "Lord, I'm Just a Baby" (Archie P. Jordan, Teddy Wilburn) - 2:52
7. "What Your Love Did for Me" (Claire Cloninger, Archie P. Jordan) - 3:06
8. "I Need to Be Still (And Let God Love Me)" (Archie P. Jordan, Naomi Martin) - 2:45
9. "Love Has Arrived" (Kent Robbins) - 3:09
10. "He's Walking in My Shoes" (Hank Martin, Archie P. Jordan) - 3:07

== Personnel ==
- B.J. Thomas – vocals
- Carl Greeson, Archie Jordan and Bobby Wood – keyboards
- Reggie Young – guitars
- Mike Leech – bass
- Jerry Kroon and Larrie Londin – drums
- Farrell Morris – bells, vibraphone
- Billy Puett – baritone saxophone, flute
- Buddy Skipper – tenor saxophone
- Bobby Taylor – oboe
- Roger Bissell and Dennis Good – trombone
- Don Sheffield and George Tidwell – trumpet
- Tom McAninch – French horn
- Roy Christensen – cello
- Marvin Chantry and Gary Vanosdale – viola
- George Binkley, Carl Gorodetzky, Shelly Kurland, Wilfred Lehmann, Steven Smith, Pamela Vanosdale and Stephanie Woolf – violin
- Mary Boone, Tom Brannon, Janie Fricke, Hank Martin, Donna McElroy, Donna McLaughlin, Donna Sheridan and Diane Tidwell – backing vocals
- Students of David Lipscomb Elementary School – children's choir
- Ann Elizabeth Lokey – choir director

== Production ==
- Archie P. Jordan – producer, arrangements
- Joe Wilson – engineer
- Glaser Sound Studios (Nashville, Tennessee) – recording and mixing location
- Jim Loyd – mastering at Masterfonics (Nashville, Tennessee)
- Doug Abdelnour – photography
- Dennis Hill – design

== Chart performance ==
You Gave Me Love peaked at No. 2 on Billboard's Best Selling Inspirational LPs in July 1980.

== Awards ==
The album won the Grammy Award for Best Inspirational Performance in 1980.
