= El Triste =

Song by José José

from the album El Triste
- Language: Spanish
- A-side: "Dos"
- Released: 1970
- Genre: Latin pop
- Label: RCA
- Songwriter: Roberto Cantoral

"El Triste" ("The Sad One") is a song written by Mexican composer Roberto Cantoral. It was performed for the first time on March 15, 1970, at the "Latin Song Festival II" (predecessor of the OTI Festival) by the Mexican singer José José. (El Triste on YouTube) El Triste was included on his third studio album.

== General information ==
The song talks about a person who is empowered to live by a longing for a loved one, which could refer either to the loss of a lover or spouse, a relative or friend—the song does not specify which exactly. The composition turned out to be very attractive both in lyrics and in its music, it catches the attention of the listener from start to finish, due to the rhetoric of the lyrics and its unique melody. "El Triste" is sung by José José in a considerably high register, highlighting the power of his voice and his extensive management of respiration. He has said it is one of the most significant interpretations that he has performed due to its technical difficulty and the impact that the song caused.

== Cultural impact ==
The song and its interpretation was such a hit, that the audience at the festival demanded that José José had won it, but in the end, even with the impact that his performance caused, he got third place. Video on YouTube Although "El Triste" did not win the festival it meant the consolidation of José José as a talented singer of international fame, since then it was the song that closed most of his presentations.

The song became his second number-one single in the Mexican charts in 1970 (replacing his other song "La nave del olvido"). "El Triste" became a cultural icon in Mexico, as part of the repertoire of favorite songs of Mexican popular music.

After its release at the festival it was immediately recorded in studio along with other new tracks on an LP released in 1970. José José recorded the song again in 1982 under new accompaniment and musical arrangement, and in 1998 in a duet with pianist Raúl di Blasio. Some of the performers who have made their version of the song include: Plácido Domingo, Manuel Mijares, Ximena Sariñana, Eddie Santiago, Vikki Carr, Yuri, Lucho Gatica, Charlie Masso, Julieta Venegas, Kalimba, David Bisbal, Cristian Castro, Il Volo, Jorge Valente and Marc Anthony among others.

Eddie Santiago's cover of the song peaked at No. 28 on the Billboard Hot Latin Songs chart. Notable live cover performances include David Bisbal during the Latin Grammy tribute to José José in 2008, Cristian Castro at the Latin Grammy Awards of 2011, and Il Volo at the 2013 Latin Billboard Music Awards after José José received the Billboard's Lifetime Achievement Award for his fifty-year career.

== Certifications ==
Region	Certification	Certified units/sales
Mexico (AMPROFON)	3× Diamond+Platinum+Gold	990,000^{‡}
^{‡} Sales+streaming figures based on certification alone.

== See also ==
- List of number-one hits of 1970 (Mexico)
