= Peter Marshall (novelist) =

British novelist (1939–1972)

- Born: 1939
- Died: 1972 (aged 32–33); Surrey, England
- Occupation: Novelist
- Writing career
- Years active: 1962–1966
- Notable awards: John Llewellyn Rhys Prize

Peter Marshall (1939–1972) was a British novelist.

== Life ==
Peter Marshall was born in 1939. At 18 years old he became infected with polio, which left him almost completely paralyzed. He wrote an autobiography (Two Lives) about his life before and after the illness, for which he received the John Llewellyn Rhys Prize in 1963. He wrote two novels, The Raging Moon (1964) and Excluded from the Cemetery (1966). The movie The Raging Moon was based on his novel by the same title. He lived and worked in a home in Surrey. He died at age 33 in 1972.

== Bibliography ==
- Marshall, Peter (1962). Two Lives. Hutchinson. OCLC 1301629.
- Marshall, Peter (1964). The Raging Moon. London: Hutchinson. OCLC 1447851.
- Marshall, Peter (1966). Excluded from the Cemetery. London: Hutchinson. OCLC 847030.
