= Grammy Award for Best Inspirational Performance =

American music award (1962–1986)

The Grammy Award for Best Inspirational Performance was awarded from 1962 to 1986. During this time the award had several name changes:

- Best Gospel or Other Religious Recording (1962, 1963)
- Best Gospel or Other Religious Recording (Musical) (1964–66)
- Best Sacred Performance (Musical) (1967)
- Best Sacred Performance (1968, 1969)
- Best Sacred Performance (Non-Classical) (1970)
- Best Sacred Performance (Musical) (1971)
- Best Sacred Performance (1972)
- Best Inspirational Performance (1973, 1974)
- Best Inspirational Performance (Non-Classical) (1975)
- Best Inspirational Performance (1976–86)

Years reflect the year in which the Grammy Awards were presented, for works released in the previous year.

== Recipients ==
Year	Winner(s)	Title	Nominees	Ref.
1962	Mahalia Jackson	Everytime I Feel the Spirit	Alex Bradford for Jesus Keep Me Near the Cross; Staple Singers for Swing Low; Tennessee Ernie Ford for Hymns at Home'; Tex Ritter for Lincoln Hymns	
1963	Mahalia Jackson	Great Songs of Love and Faith	Alex Bradford for Black Nativity; Clefs of Calvary for Same Me; Franz Rupp for Marian Anderson'; Ralph Carmichael for Hymns at Sunset; Tennessee Ernie Ford for I Love to Tell the Story	
1964	Soeur Sourire	Dominique	Bessie Griffin and the Gospel Pearls for Recorded Live!; Charles Magnuson for Piano in Concert; George Beverly Shea for The Earth Is the Lord's (and the Fullness Thereof); Kings of Harmony for Steppin' Right In; Limelighters for Makin' a Joyful Noise	
1965	Tennessee Ernie Ford	Great Gospel Songs	Dominican Nuns of Fichermont for Gregorian Chant; Fred Waring for This I Believe; George Beverly Shea for George Beverly Shea Sings Hymns of Sunrise and Sunset; Jo Stafford for Sweet Hour of Prayer; Roger Williams for Family Album of Hymns	
1966	George Beverly Shea & Anita Kerr Quartet	Southland Favorites	Blackwood Brothers for Something Old, Something New; Happy Goodman Family for What a Happy Time; Kate Smith for How Great Thou Art; Marian Anderson for Just Keep on Singing; Ralph Carmichael Singers & Orchestra for Bob Ashton's Songs of Living Faith	
1967	Porter Wagoner & Blackwood Brothers	Grand Old Gospel	Blackwood Brothers for How Big Is God; Connie Smith for Connie Smith Sings Great Sacred Songs; George Beverly Shea for Southland Songs That Lift the Heart; Happy Goodman Family for Bigger 'n' Better; Oak Ridge Boys for The Oak Ridge Boys at Their Best	
1968	Elvis Presley	How Great Thou Art	Dottie West for Dottie West Sings the Sacred Ballads; Red Foley for Songs for the Soul; George Beverly Shea, Blackwood Brothers for Surely Goodness and Mercy; The Browns for The Old Country Church	
1969	Jake Hess	Beautiful Isle of Somewhere	Ralph Carmichael for 102 Strings, Vol. 2; Anita Bryant for How Great Thou Art; Jim Bohi for I'll Fly Away; George Beverly Shea for Whispering Hope; Elvis Presley for You'll Never Walk Alone	
1970	Jake Hess	Ain't That Beautiful Singing	Bill Gaither Trio for He Touched Me; Tennessee Ernie Ford for Holy, Holy, Holy; George Beverly Shea for I Believe'; Connie Smith, Nat Stuckey for Whispering Hope	
1971	Jake Hess	Everything Is Beautiful	Mormon Tabernacle Choir, Richard Condie (conductor) for God of Our Fathers; Pat Boone for Rapture; Ralph Carmichael Orchestra and Chorus for The Centurion'; George Beverly Shea for There Is More to Life	
1972	Charley Pride	Did You Think to Pray	Anita Bryant for Abide With Me; George Beverly Shea for Amazing Grace; Dolly Parton for Golden Streets of Glory'; Pat Boone Family for Pat Boone Family	
1973	Elvis Presley	He Touched Me	Pipes & Drums & Military Band of the Royal Scots Dragoon Guards for Amazing Grace; Little Jimmy Dempsey for Award Winning Guitar; Merle Haggard for Land of Many Churches'; Ray Stevens for Love Lifted Me; Danny Lee & the Children of Truth for Spread a Little Love Around; Eugene Ormandy (conductor), Philadelphia Orchestra & Chorus for The Greatest Hits of Christmas	
1974	Bill Gaither Trio	Let's Just Praise the Lord	Connie Smith for All the Praises'; Anita Bryant for Anita Bryant... Naturally; Roy Rogers & Dale Evans for In the Sweet By and By; George Beverly Shea for There's Something About That Name	
1975	Elvis Presley	"How Great Thou Art" from the album Elvis Recorded Live on Stage in Memphis	Bill Pursell for Listen'; Tennessee Ernie Ford for Make a Joyful Noise; Bill Gaither Trio for Thanks for Sunshine; Sister Janet Mead for The Lord's Prayer	
1976	Bill Gaither Trio	Jesus, We Just Want to Thank You	Larry Hart for Amazing Grace'; Anita Kerr for Gentle as Morning; The Speers for Something Good Is About to Happen; Ray Price for This Time Lord	
1977	Gary S. Paxton	The Astonishing, Outrageous, Amazing, Incredible, Unbelievable, Different World of Gary S. Paxton	Willie Nelson for Amazing Grace'; Stevie Wonder for Have a Talk With God; Sonny James for Just a Closer Walk With Thee; Ray Price for Precious Memories; Charlie Rich for Silver Linings; Pat Boone for Something Super Natural; Charley Pride for Sunday Morning with Charley Pride	
1978	B.J. Thomas	Home Where I Belong	Ray Price for How Great Thou Art'; Quincy Jones, James Cleveland, Wattsline Choir for O Lord, Come By Here; Carol Lawrence for Tell All the World About Love; Various Artists for Your Arm's Too Short to Box With God	
1979	B.J. Thomas	Happy Man	Billy Preston for Behold'; The Boones for First Class; Larry Hart for Goin' Up In Smoke; Tennessee Ernie Ford for He Touched Me; Anita Kerr for Precious Memories	
1980	B.J. Thomas	You Gave Me Love (When Nobody Gave Me a Prayer)	Mike Douglas for I'll Sing This Song for You; Pat Boone for Just the Way I Am; Noel Paul Stookey for Band and Bodyworks; Willie Nelson, Leon Russell for I Saw the Light	
1981	Debby Boone	With My Song	B.J. Thomas for Everything Always Works Out for the Best; Willie Nelson for Family Bible; Commodores for Jesus Is Love; Bob Dylan for Saved	
1982	B.J. Thomas	Amazing Grace	Donna Summer for I Believe In Jesus; Crusaders with Joe Cocker for I'm So Glad I'm Standing Here Today; Barbara Mandrell for In My Heart; Don Williams for Miracles; Bob Dylan for Shot of Love	
1983	Barbara Mandrell	He Set My Life to Music	Kansas for Crossfire; Leontyne Price for God Bless America; B.J. Thomas for Miracle; Oak Ridge Boys for Would They Love Him Down in Shreveport	
1984	Donna Summer	"He's a Rebel" from the album She Works Hard for the Money	Cristy Lane for I've Come Back (To Say I Love You One More Time); Leontyne Price for Noel! Noel!; B.J. Thomas for Peace In the Valley; Linda Hopkins for Precious Lord	
1985	Donna Summer	"Forgive Me" from the album Cats Without Claws	Lisa Whelchel for All Because of You; Philip Bailey for The Wonders of His Love; Pat Boone for What I Believe; Deniece Williams for Whiter Than Snow	
1986	Jennifer Holliday	"Come Sunday" from the album Say You Love Me	Pat Boone for 16,000 Faces; Barbara Mandrell for Christmas at Our House; Glen Campbell for No More Light; Kool & the Gang for You Are the One	
