= Love to Burn =

Studio album by B. J. Thomas
- Released: October 18, 2007
- Genre: Pop rock, Country
- Length: 49:29
- Label: Raindrops Records

B. J. Thomas chronology
Home for Christmas	Love to Burn	The Living Room Sessions

Professional ratings
Review scores
Source	Rating
About.com	4/5 stars
American Songwriter	3/5 stars
CD Baby	4.75/5 stars
iTunes	5/5 stars

Love to Burn is a fully orchestrated album by B. J. Thomas, released in 2007, and the first studio release from him in a decade. With his daughters grown, the five time Grammy award winner was encouraged to return to the studio by the fan reception for his Raindrops and Boondocks Tour attendance. It was also a reintroduction of his hit single, "Raindrops Keep Fallin' on My Head" in the film Spider-Man 2 (2004).

== Track list ==
Love to Burn (2007)
No.	Title	Writer(s)	Length
1.	"Love to Burn"		3:41
2.	"A Song for You"		4:45
3.	"Heaven's Gotta Help"		4:42
4.	"Back Against the Wall"		4:44
5.	"Angel"	Sarah McLachlan	4:34
6.	"A Miracle in You"		4:45
7.	"Streets of Fire"		4:11
8.	"Stranger in the Mirror"	Dobie Gray	3:54
9.	"Be Honest"		3:15
10.	"Play Something Sweet"	Allen Toussaint	4:36
11.	"I Never Could Have Made It Without You"		3:27
12.	"T-R-O-U-B-L-E"	Jerry Chesnut	2:55
