= Whatever Happened to Old-Fashioned Love =

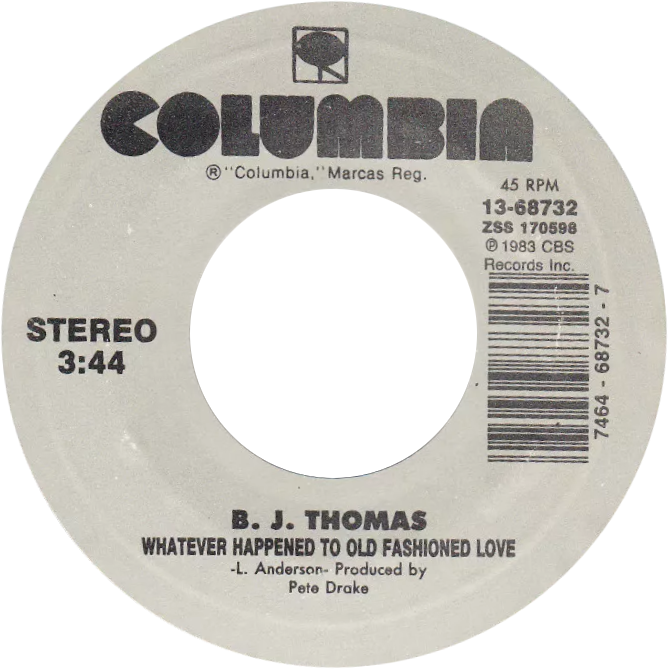
- A US vinyl reissue

Single by B. J. Thomas

from the album New Looks
- B-side: "I Just Sing"
- Released: May 1983
- Genre: Country
- Label: Columbia
- Songwriter(s): Lewis Anderson
- Producer(s): Pete Drake

B. J. Thomas singles chronology
"But Love Me" (1982)	"Whatever Happened to Old-Fashioned Love" (1983)	"New Looks from an Old Lover" (1983)

"Whatever Happened to Old-Fashioned Love" is a song recorded by American country music artist B. J. Thomas. It was released in May 1983 as the first single from the album New Looks. The song was written by Lewis Anderson.

The song was his biggest hit in over five years. "Whatever Happened to Old-Fashioned Love" was the second of three number ones on the country chart. It was his first number one since "(Hey Won't You Play) Another Somebody Done Somebody Wrong Song" eight years before. The single stayed at number one for one week and spent a total of fourteen weeks on the country chart. The song was Thomas' final entry on the pop chart, reaching number 93.

The song was a Top 20 pop hit in the UK for Daniel O'Donnell in the 1990s.

== Charts ==
=== Weekly charts ===
Chart (1983)	Peak position
Canadian RPM Country Tracks	1
US Hot Country Songs (Billboard)	1
US Billboard Hot 100	93
US Adult Contemporary (Billboard)	13

=== Year-end charts ===
Chart (1983)	Position
US Hot Country Songs (Billboard)	3
