= Two Car Garage =

Single by B. J. Thomas

from the album The Great American Dream
- B-side: "Beautiful World
- Released: November 25, 1983
- Genre: Country
- Label: Columbia
- Songwriter(s): J. D. Martin, Gary Harrison
- Producer(s): Pete Drake

B. J. Thomas singles chronology
"New Looks from an Old Lover" (1983)	"Two Car Garage" (1983)	"The Whole World's in Love When You're Lonely" (1984)

"Two Car Garage" is a song recorded by American country music artist B. J. Thomas. It was released in November 1983 as the first single from his album The Great American Dream. The song reached No. 3 on the Billboard Hot Country Songs chart in February 1984 and No. 1 on the RPM Country Tracks chart in Canada. The song was written J. D. Martin and Gary Harrison.

== Music video ==
A music video for the song was produced and aired on CMT, Great American Country and The Nashville Network.

== Chart performance ==
Chart (1983–1984)	Peak position
US Hot Country Songs (Billboard)	3
US Adult Contemporary (Billboard)	44
Canadian RPM Country Tracks	1
