= Rock and Roll Lullaby =

Single by B. J. Thomas

from the album Billy Joe Thomas
- B-side: "Are We Losing Touch"
- Released: January 1972
- Genre: Pop
- Length: 4:08
- Label: Scepter
- Songwriter: Barry Mann/Cynthia Weil
- Producers: Steve Tyrell, Al Gorgoni

B. J. Thomas singles chronology
"Long Ago Tomorrow" (1971)	"Rock and Roll Lullaby" (1972)	"That's What Friends Are For" (1972)

"Rock and Roll Lullaby" is a 1972 hit single performed by B. J. Thomas. It was written by Barry Mann and Cynthia Weil and appeared on his album Billy Joe Thomas.

== Song lyrics ==
The song is sung in a first-person narrative of an adolescent or adult raised by a single teenage mother during the early years of rock-and-roll. Despite the bleakness of their situation, whenever the child cries, the mother sings him to sleep with a 'sha-na-na-na-na-na-na, it'll be all right...sha-na-na-na-na-na-na-na-na, just hold on tight'. In the second verse, the narrator notes that despite hardships, they'd 'dream of better mornings when Mama sang her song', and that while it didn't make sense to try to recall the words, the loving meaning beneath them was all that mattered.

== Production ==
The song was produced by Steve Tyrell. After the recording of a basic rhythm track, Steve Tyrell and B. J. Thomas had the inspiration of blending several unique and recognizable signature sounds associated with early American rock recordings. The single's backup vocals are first performed by the Blossoms. Duane Eddy plays the lead guitar in his "twangy" signature style with Al Gorgoni's electric guitar distorted and clean. At around three minutes, Thomas sings his final vocals, and a Beach Boys sound (provided by Dave Somerville and three members of the Ron Hicklin Singers: Tom Bahler, Gene Morford & Hicklin) begins then carries the track to over 4 minutes.

== Personnel ==
- Lead vocals: B. J. Thomas
- Backing vocals: The Blossoms (Darlene Love, Fanita James & Jean King) with Dave Somerville, Ron Hicklin, Tom Bahler & Gene Morford
- Acoustic guitar: Al Gorgoni & Teddy Irwin
- Electric guitar: Al Gorgoni (fuzztone) & Duane Eddy (signature twang)
- Electric piano: Barry Mann
- Drums: Alan Schwartzenberg
- Percussion: Dave Cary & George Devens
- Strings arranged by Glen Spreen
- Produced by Steve Tyrell & Al Gorgoni

== Chart performance ==
"Rock and Roll Lullaby" reached number 15 on the Billboard Hot 100, and was the third number one for Thomas on the Easy Listening chart, where it spent one week in March 1972.

== Popular culture ==
- The song was a hit in Brazil because of its appearance as a love theme in the soap opera Selva de Pedra.

== See also ==
- List of Billboard Easy Listening number ones of 1972
