= On My Way (B.J. Thomas album) =

Studio album by B. J. Thomas
- Released: 1968
- Recorded: 1968
- Studio: American (Memphis, Tennessee)
- Genre: Pop, rock
- Length: 30:33
- Label: Scepter
- Producer: Chips Moman

B. J. Thomas chronology
Tomorrow Never Comes (1966)	On My Way (1968)	Young And In Love (1969)

On My Way is a studio album by B. J. Thomas via Scepter Records. Released in 1968, the album contained two singles: "The Eyes of a New York Woman" (which reached No. 28 in the U.S. and No. 29 in Canada) and "Hooked on a Feeling" (which peaked at No. 5 in the U.S. and No. 3 in Canada). Also included on the album are covers of "Four Walls" (originally by Jim Reeves), "Light My Fire" (originally by the Doors) and "Mr. Businessman" (originally by Ray Stevens).

== Track listing ==
1. "The Eyes of a New York Woman" (Mark James) - 3:03
2. "Mr. Businessman" (Fred Foster, Ray Stevens) - 3:21
3. "Light My Fire" (Robby Krieger) - 3:01
4. "Gone" (Smokey Rogers) - 3:50
5. "Hooked on a Feeling" (Mark James) - 2:48
6. "Smoke Gets in Your Eyes" (Otto Harbach, Jerome Kern) - 3:03
7. "Four Walls" (Marvin Moore, George Campbell) - 2:52
8. "Sandman" (Wayne Carson) - 3:16
9. "I've Been Down This Road Before" (Mark James, Spooner Oldham) - 2:51
10. "I Saw Pity in the Face of a Friend" (Nickolas Ashford, Valerie Simpson) - 2:25

== Chart performance ==
Chart (1968)	Peak position
U.S. Billboard 200	133
