= New Looks from an Old Lover =

Single by B. J. Thomas

from the album New Looks
- B-side: "You Keep the Man in Me Happy (And the Child in Me Alive)"
- Released: July 9, 1983
- Genre: Country
- Label: Columbia
- Songwriters: Red Lane, Gloria Thomas, Lathan Hudson
- Producer: Pete Drake

B. J. Thomas singles chronology
"Whatever Happened to Old-Fashioned Love" (1983)	"New Looks from an Old Lover" (1983)	"Two Car Garage" (1983)

"New Looks from an Old Lover" is a song recorded by American country music artist B. J. Thomas. It was released in July 1983 as the second single from the album New Looks. "New Looks from an Old Lover" was Thomas' third number one on the country chart. The single went to number one for one week and spent a total of thirteen weeks on the country chart. It was Thomas' final number one hit on the U.S. charts. The song was written by Thomas' wife Gloria, along with Red Lane and Lathan Hudson.

The single was distributed on a vinyl 7-inch, 45 rpm phonograph record and is from the 1983 album New Looks, which hit number 13 on the Billboard Top Country Albums chart, released on vinyl LP and cassette tape. The song was also released on several other albums from Thomas including Wind Beneath My Wings in 1995 (CD and cassette), The Best of B.J. Thomas: New Looks and Old Fashioned Love in 2000 (CD) and as an acoustic arrangement in a duet with Etta Britt on The Living Room Sessions in 2013 (CD and digital download).

== Charts ==
=== Weekly charts ===
Chart (1983)	Peak position
US Hot Country Songs (Billboard)	1
Canadian RPM Country Tracks	6

=== Year-end charts ===
Chart (1983)	Position
US Hot Country Songs (Billboard)	18
