= Longhorns & Londonbridges =

Studio album by B. J. Thomas
- Released: 1974
- Recorded: 1974
- Studio: Record Plant (New York City)
- Genre: Pop rock, country rock, rhythm and blues
- Label: Paramount
- Producer: Al Gorgoni, Steve Tyrell

B. J. Thomas chronology
| Songs (1973) | Longhorns & Londonbridges (1974) | Reunion (1975) |

Longhorns & Londonbridges is a 1974 album by B. J. Thomas, released on Paramount Records. It is commonly misidentified as Longhorn & London Bridges.

== Album history ==
Longhorns and Londonbridges was the second and final album that Thomas recorded for Paramount Records, following the end of his six-year relationship with Scepter Records in 1972. The record was released in the same year that Paramount Pictures sold its rights in the Paramount Records label to ABC Records, which in turn was sold to MCA Records in 1979. At this point, ABC Records was dissolved as an independent record label, with only the best-selling ABC recordings being reissued on MCA Records.

The distribution and sales of many records released during this period of significant label transitions (1974-1979) were negatively affected. Thomas' album releases during this period were all on the Paramount, ABC and MCA labels, and so were similarly affected. While Thomas was to continue with degrees of success in the release of singles, no singles were released from Longhorns & Londonbridges and its chart success was marginal. It was not reissued by MCA Records and has not been reissued on CD.

Longhorns & Londonbridges contains some of the last recordings of Professor Alex Bradford, a well-known gospel performer. It is also notable for the extensive songwriting and performance contributions of Randall Bramblett, as well as for containing one of the five versions of Allen Toussaint's "Play Something Sweet (Brickyard Blues)" released by various artists in 1974. The album also contains one of the earliest cover versions of a Dennis Locorriere song, as well as one of the earliest of the comparatively rare songwriting collaborations between Gerry Goffin and Mark James. It features the participation of many well-known musicians, such as Randy Brecker, Michael Brecker, Don Grolnick, Lou Marini, Hugh McCracken and Elliott Randall.

== Track listing ==
1. "Play Something Sweet (Brickyard Blues)" (Allen Toussaint)
2. "I'm Callin'" (Randall Bramblett)
3. "Too Many Irons" (Bramblett)
4. "Sacred Harmony" (Bramblett)
5. "40 Days and 40 Nights" (Bramblett, Davis Causey, Bob Jones)
6. "Talkin' Confidentially" (Gerry Goffin, Mark James)
7. "City Sunday Morning Day" (Richard Supa)
8. "Conversation" (Buddy Buie, J.R. Cobb)
9. "I Won't Be Following You" (Dennis Locorriere)
10. "Superman" (Bramblett)

== Personnel ==
- David Bargaron - trombone
- Prof. Alex Bradford - vocals
- Randall Bramblett - piano, keyboards, vocals
- Michael Brecker - saxophone
- Randy Brecker - trumpet
- Peter Gordon - horn, French horn
- Al Gorgoni - guitar, vocals, producer
- Paul Griffin - keyboards
- Don Grolnick - keyboards
- Rodney Justo - vocals
- Jimmy Maelen - percussion, tambourine
- Bob Mann - guitar
- Lou Marini - flute, piccolo, saxophone
- Rick Marotta - drums
- Hugh McCracken - guitar
- Andy Muson - bass
- Elliott Randall - guitar
- Allan Schwartzberg - drums
- Lew Soloff - trumpet
- Jon Stroll - keyboards
- Richard Supa - guitar
- Bell Tree - guitar
- Steve Tyrell - percussion, vocals, producer
- Georg Wadenius - guitar
- Paul Buckmaster - orchestral arrangements
- Shelly Yakus - original balance and mixing engineer
