= (Hey Won't You Play) Another Somebody Done Somebody Wrong Song =

Single by B. J. Thomas

from the album Reunion
- B-side: "City Boys"
- Released: January 1975
- Recorded: September 1974
- Studio: American (Nashville, Tennessee)
- Genre: Countrypolitan
- Length: 3:23
- Label: ABC 12054
- Songwriters: Larry Butler, Chips Moman
- Producer: Chips Moman

B. J. Thomas singles chronology
"Rock and Roll Lullaby" (1972)	"(Hey Won't You Play) Another Somebody Done Somebody Wrong Song" (1975)	"Help Me Make it (To My Rocking Chair)" (1975)

"(Hey Won't You Play) Another Somebody Done Somebody Wrong Song" is an American country song made famous by B. J. Thomas. It won the 1976 Grammy for Best Country Song, awarded to its songwriters Larry Butler and Chips Moman.

The song debuted at No. 99 on the Billboard Hot 100 on February 1, 1975. The hit song became Thomas' second No. 1 single two months later, on April 26. At ten words, including the parenthetical part "Hey Won't You Play", it became the longest title of any single to top the Hot 100 up to that time. It would hold the record for six years until "Stars on 45" by Stars on 45, whose proper charting title is 41 words long due to a copyright agreement, climbed to the top in the summer of 1981. It also topped Billboard's Easy Listening chart, and was the last of his four Number Ones on that chart. It also peaked at No. 1 on the Billboard Hot Country Songs chart. Billboard ranked it as the number 17 song for 1975.

Although Thomas would not have any major country hits for another eight years, this hit song spearheaded his future success as a mainstream artist in that genre.

In 1976, the song was performed by the Muppets on The Muppet Show. In 1979, Larry Butler produced a cover version by Kenny Rogers and Dottie West, for their album Classics. Alvin and the Chipmunks and Butler covered the song for the 1981 album Urban Chipmunk. Butler produced the song again in 1981 on the Sammy Davis Jr. album Closest of Friends.

"(Hey Won't You Play) Another Somebody Done Somebody Wrong Song" was certified gold for sales of one million units by the Recording Industry Association of America.

== Charts ==
=== Weekly charts ===
Chart (1975)	Peak position
Australia (Kent Music Report)	10
Canada Top Singles (RPM)	3
Canada Adult Contemporary Tracks (RPM)	1
Canada Country Tracks (RPM)	2
New Zealand Singles Chart	3
US Billboard Hot 100	1
US Hot Country Songs (Billboard)	1
US Adult Contemporary (Billboard)	1

=== Year-end charts ===
Chart (1975)	Peak position
Australia (Kent Music Report)	74

== Certifications ==
Region	Certification	Certified units/sales
United States (RIAA)	Gold	1,000,000^{^}
^{^} Shipments figures based on certification alone.
