= Reunion (B.J. Thomas album) =

Studio album by B. J. Thomas
- Released: 1975
- Studio: American (Nashville)
- Genre: Country
- Length: 29:37
- Label: ABC
- Producer: Chips Moman

B. J. Thomas chronology
Longhorns & Londonbridges (1974)	Reunion (1975)	Help Me Make It (To My Rockin' Chair) (1975)

Reunion is an album by B. J. Thomas, released via ABC Records in 1975. His first country album, it reached No. 59 on the U.S. Billboard Top LPs chart and peaked at No. 2 on the Top Country Albums chart. In Canada, it reached No. 40 on its overall albums chart.

Reunion contains a signature hit single by Thomas, "(Hey Won't You Play) Another Somebody Done Somebody Wrong Song". It reached No. 1 on the Billboard Hot 100, Easy Listening, and Hot Country Singles charts in the United States. In Canada, it peaked at No. 2 on Canada's adult contemporary chart, No. 2 on its country chart and No. 3 on its pop chart. It also hit No. 3 in New Zealand.

The album won Best Country Song for "(Hey Won't You Play) Another Somebody Done Somebody Wrong Song" in 1976. It was ranked the No. 17 top song of 1975.

== Track listing ==
1. "(Hey Won't You Play) Another Somebody Done Somebody Wrong Song" (Chips Moman, Larry Butler) - 3:23
2. "Real Life Blues" (Larry Keith, Steve Pippin) - 2:47
3. "Crying" (Joe Melson, Roy Orbison) - 2:36
4. "I Finally Got It Right This Time" (Larry Keith, Steve Pippin) - 2:16
5. "Doctor God" (Dan Penn, Jerry McGill, Johnny Christopher) - 3:07
6. "Beautiful Things for You" (Barry Mason, Toni Wine) - 2:54
7. "Sea of Love" (George Khoury, John Phillip Baptiste) - 2:49
8. "Maybe It's Time to Go" (Stu Nunnery) - 3:59
9. "City Boys" (Bill Dean) - 2:23
10. "Who Broke Your Heart and Made You Write That Song?" (Michael Chain) - 3:23

== Personnel ==
- String arrangement – Mike Leech
- Art direction and design – Peter Corriston
- Engineer – Bob Goodman, Harold Lee
- Photography by Benno Friedman
- Producer, engineer – Chips Moman
- Musicians: Bobby Emmons, Bobby Wood, Chips Moman, Gene Chrisman, Johnny Christopher, Mike Leech, Reggie Young, Shane Keister, Steve Gibson

== Chart performance ==
Chart (1975)	Peak position
U.S. Billboard 200	59
U.S. Billboard Top Country Albums	2
