= Hal David =

American lyricist (1921–2012)

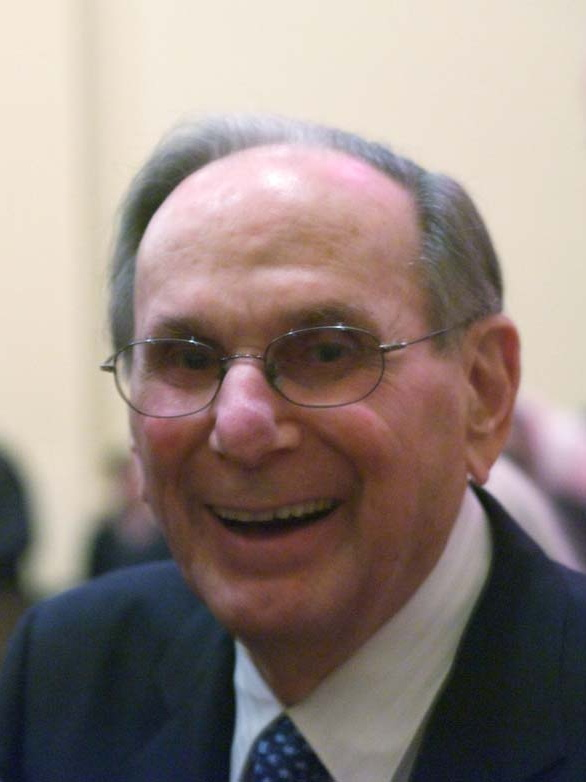
- David at the 2011 ASCAP concert

Background information
- Born: Harold Lane David; May 25, 1921; New York City, U.S.
- Died: September 1, 2012 (aged 91) Los Angeles, California, U.S.
- Genre: Pop
- Occupation: Lyricist
- Years active: 1940s–2012
- Spouses: Anne Rauchman (died 1987): Eunice Forester

Harold Lane David (May 25, 1921 – September 1, 2012) was an American lyricist. He was best known for his collaborations with composer Burt Bacharach and his association with Dionne Warwick.

== Early life ==
David was born and raised in New York City, a son of Austrian Jewish immigrants Lina (née Goldberg) and Gedalie David (né Gedalie Dawid), who owned a delicatessen in New York. He is the younger brother of American lyricist and songwriter Mack David. David attended Thomas Jefferson High School in Brooklyn and studied Journalism at New York University.

== Career ==
David is credited with popular music lyrics, beginning in the 1940s with material written for bandleader Sammy Kaye and for Guy Lombardo. He worked with Morty Nevins of The Three Suns on four songs for the feature film Two Gals and a Guy (1951), starring Janis Paige and Robert Alda. They also wrote the classic Christmas song, “I Believe in Santa Claus”, which was recorded by The Stargazers in 1950.

In 1956, David began working with composer Burt Bacharach at Famous Music in the Brill Building in New York. That year, the two published several songs, including "I Cry More" (featured in the motion picture Don't Knock the Rock), "The Morning Mail", and "Peggy's In The Pantry". The next year, their song "The Story of My Life" became a country hit for singer Marty Robbins.

In the UK, a version of "The Story of My Life" recorded by Michael Holliday reached No. 1 in 1958 before being replaced by Perry Como's "Magic Moments", the first time any songwriter had consecutive #1 hits in the UK Singles Chart.

Subsequently, in the 1960s and early 1970s Bacharach and David wrote some of the most enduring songs in American popular music, many for Dionne Warwick and also for Carpenters, Dusty Springfield, B. J. Thomas, Gene Pitney, Tom Jones, Jackie DeShannon and others.

Bacharach and David hits included "Alfie", "Raindrops Keep Fallin' on My Head", "This Guy's in Love with You", "I'll Never Fall in Love Again", "Do You Know the Way to San Jose", "Walk On By", "What the World Needs Now Is Love", "I Say a Little Prayer", "(There's) Always Something There to Remind Me", "One Less Bell to Answer" and "Anyone Who Had a Heart".

The duo's film work includes the Oscar-nominated title songs for "What's New Pussycat?" and "Alfie", "The Look of Love", from Casino Royale; and the Oscar-winning "Raindrops Keep Fallin' on My Head" from Butch Cassidy and the Sundance Kid. In addition, the songs "Don't Make Me Over", "(They Long to Be) Close to You" and "Walk On By" have been inducted into the Grammy Hall of Fame.

Bacharach and David also collaborated on three musicals. Their first work in this genre was the 1966 television musical On the Flip Side, which was created as a starring vehicle for Ricky Nelson and Joanie Sommers. Their second musical, the Broadway musical Promises, Promises, was nominated for the 1969 Tony Award for Best Musical at the 23rd Tony Awards. The original cast recording won the 1969 Grammy Award for Best Musical Theater Album at the 12th Annual Grammy Awards.

The Bacharach-David partnership, which had been long and both critically and financially successful, was effectively terminated by their experiences working on the score of their third musical. The 1973 musical film Lost Horizon was a critical and commercial disappointment. Increasing tensions between the two with regard to the work led to an exchange of lawsuits, destroying their professional relationship. Despite the professional split, Bacharach continued to acknowledge David's contributions, frequently highlighting the lyrics of Alfie, which he described as "one of the best lyrics Hal, or anyone else, has written," and calling the song "as close to the best [they] ever wrote."

David worked successfully as a lyricist with other composers before, during and after his time with Bacharach. Perhaps his best known non-Bacharach song was "To All the Girls I've Loved Before", with music by Albert Hammond, which was a hit for Willie Nelson and Julio Iglesias. He also wrote Sarah Vaughan's "Broken Hearted Melody", with Sherman Edwards; the 1962 Joanie Sommers hit "Johnny Get Angry" also with Edwards; and "99 Miles From L.A." with Albert Hammond, recorded by Hammond and later Art Garfunkel. With Paul Hampton, David co-wrote the country standard "Sea of Heartbreak", a hit for Don Gibson and others, and, with Archie Jordan, the top 20 Ronnie Milsap hit, "It Was Almost Like a Song".

David contributed lyrics to three James Bond film themes—in addition to "The Look of Love" from Casino Royale (1967) with Bacharach, he wrote "We Have All the Time in the World", with John Barry and sung by Louis Armstrong for the 1969 film On Her Majesty's Secret Service, and in 1979, "Moonraker", also with Barry, sung by Bond regular Shirley Bassey for the film of the same name.

David and Bacharach were awarded the 2011 Gershwin Prize for Popular Song, bestowed by the Library of Congress, the first time a songwriting team was given the honor. David was recuperating from an illness and was unable to attend the Washington D.C. presentation ceremony in May 2012.

The television tribute, What the World Needs Now: Words by Hal David was aired on public television stations and released on home video in 2019. The program was hosted by Bette Midler and contained archival interviews with Hal David, and commentary, tributes, and archival performances with Burt Bacharach, Dionne Warwick, Valerie Simpson, Barbra Streisand, Cher, Dusty Springfield, B.J. Thomas, and Glen Campbell.

== Personal life and death ==
David had two sons with his first wife Anne. After his first wife died, he married his second wife Eunice Forester. At the time of his death he had three grandchildren. David lived for many years in East Hills, New York, in the historic Mackay Estate Dairyman's Cottage of the Harbor Hill estate.

On September 1, 2012, David died from a stroke at Cedars-Sinai Medical Center in Los Angeles, at the age of 91.

He is interred in the Forest Lawn Memorial Park beside his first wife, Anne, who died in 1987.

== Awards and nominations ==
=== Academy Awards ===
Year	Category	Nominated work	Result	Ref.
1965	Best Original Song	"What's New Pussycat?" (from What's New Pussycat?) (shared with Burt Bacharach)	Nominated	
1966	Best Original Song	"Alfie" (from Alfie) (shared with Burt Bacharach)	Nominated	
1967	Best Original Song	"The Look of Love" (from Casino Royale) (shared with Burt Bacharach)	Nominated	
1969	Best Original Song	"Raindrops Keep Fallin' On My Head" (from Butch Cassidy and the Sundance Kid) (shared with Burt Bacharach)	Won	

=== Academy of Country Music Awards ===
Year	Category	Nominated work	Result	Ref.
1984	Single Record of the Year	"To All the Girls I've Loved Before" (shared with Albert Hammond)	Won	
1984	Song of the Year	"To All the Girls I've Loved Before" (shared with Albert Hammond)	Nominated	

=== Country Music Association Awards ===
Year	Category	Nominated work	Result	Ref.
1977	Song of the Year	"It Was Almost Like a Song" (shared with Archie Jordan)	Nominated	
1978	Song of the Year	"It Was Almost Like a Song" (shared with Archie Jordan)	Nominated	
1984	Song of the Year	"To All the Girls I've Loved Before" (shared with Albert Hammond)	Nominated	

=== Golden Globe Awards ===
Year	Category	Nominated work	Result	Ref.
1966	Best Original Song	"Alfie" (from Alfie) (shared with Burt Bacharach)	Nominated	
1969	Best Original Song	"Raindrops Keep Fallin' On My Head" (from Butch Cassidy and the Sundance Kid) (shared with Burt Bacharach)	Nominated	
1971	Best Original Song	"Long Ago Tomorrow" (from The Raging Moon) (shared with Burt Bacharach)	Nominated	
1973	Best Original Song	"Send a Little Love My Way" (from Oklahoma Crude) (shared with Henry Mancini)	Nominated	

=== Grammy Awards ===
Year	Category	Nominated work	Result	Ref.
1964	Song of the Year	"Wives and Lovers" (shared with Burt Bacharach)	Nominated	
1968	Best Instrumental Theme	"Casino Royale" (shared with Burt Bacharach)	Nominated	
1970	Song of the Year	"I'll Never Fall in Love Again" (shared with Burt Bacharach)	Nominated	
1970	Song of the Year	"Raindrops Keep Fallin' On My Head" (shared with Burt Bacharach)	Nominated	
1970	Best Contemporary Song	"Raindrops Keep Fallin' On My Head" (shared with Burt Bacharach)	Nominated	
1970	Best Score from an Original Cast Show Album	Promises, Promises (shared with Burt Bacharach, Henry Jerome, and Phil Ramone)	Won	
1978	Best Country Song	"It Was Almost Like a Song" (shared with Archie Jordan)	Nominated	

=== Tony Awards ===
Year	Category	Nominated work	Result	Ref.
1969	Best Musical	Promises, Promises (shared with Neil Simon, Burt Bacharach, and David Merrick)	Nominated	

=== Honors ===
- 1972: inducted into the Songwriters Hall of Fame
- 1984: elected to the Nashville Songwriters Hall of Fame
- 1991: received a Doctor of Music degree from Lincoln College, Illinois, for his major contribution to American music
- 1997: Grammy Trustees Award (with Burt Bacharach)
- 2000: received an honorary doctorate of humane letters degree from Claremont Graduate University
- 2009: Golden Plate Award of the American Academy of Achievement
- 2011: The Songwriters Hall of Fame presented him their newest award, the Visionary Leadership Award, for his decades of service
- 2011: received a star on the Hollywood Walk of Fame
- 2012: Gershwin prize recipient

=== Achievements ===
- Founder of the Los Angeles Music Center
- Member of the board of governors of Cedars-Sinai Medical Center
- Member of the board of directors of ASCAP, having served as its president, and later worked on reform of intellectual property rights
- Served on the advisory board of the Society of Singers
- Member of the board of visitors of Claremont Graduate University in California
- Chairman of the board of the National Academy of Popular Music and its Songwriters Hall of Fame

== Work on Broadway ==
- Promises, Promises (1968) – musical – lyricist
- André DeShields' Haarlem Nocturne (1984) – revue – featured songwriter
- The Look of Love (2003) – revue – lyricist

== See also ==
- List of songwriter tandems
- List of songs written by Burt Bacharach
