= The Raging Moon =

1971 British film by Bryan Forbes

- British 1-sheet poster by Arnaldo Putzu
- Directed by: Bryan Forbes
- Written by: Bryan Forbes; Shelagh Delaney (uncredited)
- Based on: The Raging Moon by Peter Marshall
- Produced by: Bruce Curtis
- Starring: Malcolm McDowell; Nanette Newman; Georgia Brown; Barry Jackson
- Cinematography: Tony Imi
- Edited by: Timothy Gee
- Music by: Stanley Myers
- Production company: EMI Elstree
- Distributed by: MGM-EMI
- Release dates: 21 January 1971 (London); 22 January 1971 (UK)
- Running time: 110 minutes
- Country: United Kingdom
- Language: English
- Budget: £260,000

The Raging Moon (released in the US as Long Ago, Tomorrow) is a 1971 British romantic drama film starring Malcolm McDowell and Nanette Newman and based on the book by British novelist Peter Marshall. Adapted and directed by Bryan Forbes (Newman's husband), this "romance in wheelchairs" was considered unusual in its time owing in part to the sexual nature of the relationship between McDowell and Newman, who play disabled people. The film received two Golden Globe nominations, for Best Foreign Film (English Language), and Best Song for "Long Ago Tomorrow".

== Plot ==
Bruce Pritchard is a 24-year-old working-class man and amateur football player with a passion for life. All this changes when he finds himself struck down by an incurable degenerative disease which means he'll need to use a wheelchair for the rest of his life. He goes into a church-run home for the disabled, believing that his immediate family don't feel able to care for him. His bitterness at his fate and his dislike of the rules and regulations of the place only serve to make him more withdrawn and angry at his enforced imprisonment.

Pritchard gets to know a fellow patient, Jill Matthews, a 31-year-old woman from a wealthy family, who is also a wheelchair user, due to polio. Bruce begins to harbour romantic feelings for Matthews; however, before he can make his feelings known, she leaves the institution to return home and marry longstanding fiancé, Geoffrey. However, Jill soon realises that Geoffrey is half-hearted about marrying her and so breaks off the engagement and returns to the institution.

Gradually, she is able to break through Pritchard's shell of cynicism and lack of respect for authority, bringing life back to his existence. In the process, the two fall in love and admit their feelings for each other, going on to get engaged. Bruce and Jill's difficult circumstances have resulted in them finding the love of their lives. Soon, though, Jill dies from a virus. Bruce almost returns to his depression but, because of the courage he has found within himself through knowing Jill, is able to go on living.

== Cast ==
- Malcolm McDowell as Bruce Pritchard
- Nanette Newman as Jill Matthews
- Georgia Brown as Sarah Charles
- Barry Jackson as Bill Charles
- Gerald Sim as Reverend Carbett
- Michael Flanders as Clarence Marlow
- Margery Mason as Matron
- Geoffrey Whitehead as Harold Pritchard
- Chris Chittell as Terry
- Jack Woolgar as Bruce's Father
- Patsy Smart as Bruce's Mother
- Norman Bird as Dr. Matthews
- Constance Chapman as Mrs. Matthews
- Michael Lees as Geoffrey
- Bernard Lee as Uncle Bob
- Geoffrey Bayldon as Mr. Latbury
- Theresa Watson as Gladys
- Petra Markham as Mary
- Paul Darrow as Doctor

== Background ==
=== Original novel ===
It was based on a novel by Peter Marshall, who contracted polio when he was eighteen and lived the rest of his life in a wheelchair. (He died of pneumonia in 1972.) The novel was originally published in 1964. Kirkus Reviews called it "a short novel, written with a sharpness of intelligence and feeling, and it is altogether genuine, a word easily exploited and seldom justified." The New York Times called it a "fine, moving novel." In 1965 director Robert Butler bought the screen rights to it and another Marshall novel, Two Lives.

=== 1967 TV adaptation ===
The novel was adapted for television by the BBC in 1967 as part of the Boy Meets Girl anthology series. The main parts were played by Ray Brooks and Anna Calder-Marshall.

Dennis Potter, reviewing it for the New Statesman, said the production "kept erupting into something raw and genuine."

== Production ==
=== Development ===
Film rights eventually went to producer Bruce Curtis, nephew of Harry Cohn, who had just made Otley (1969). He initially tried to finance the film through Columbia, but was turned down. Shelagh Delaney wrote a script.

Curtis took the project to Bryan Forbes who had recently been appointed head of EMI Films. Forbes agreed to write and direct the film as well. Forbes was in the unusual position of being able to green-light his own film.

He was highly criticized in some quarters for directing a film while running the studio. He said at the time he did it to keep the studio active in "the traditionally dull time in January–February" and says he directed it because there was no one cheaper than himself (he took no directing fee). Forbes later wrote in his memoirs "the main reason for my decision was to keep the studio open and avoid wholesale redundancies amongst the permanent workforce."

Filmink magazine argued for Forbes to make Raging Moon "truly was a mad decision on his part" as "running a studio" was "a full-time job and for Forbes to go off and write and direct a feature film (another all-encompassing job) was foolish."

=== Casting ===
Forbes cast Malcolm McDowell and his wife, Nanette Newman in the lead roles. Forbes later wrote "I believed passionately in the subject and felt that in casting Malcolm MacDowell I had a potential star." (McDowell had appeared in if... and been cast in A Clockwork Orange. Forbes claimed he cast his wife because she was "right for the part". (He later wrote in his memoirs he was partly motivated to cast her to make up for the fact that another film Newman appeared in, A Fine and Private Place, was cancelled mid production. However that film was actually shot after Raging Moon.)

The casting of these actors meant Forbes had to age up the characters in the script.

Malcolm McDowell and Nanette Newman researched their roles at Stoke Mandeville Hospital. Newman later called her role "the best part I've ever had".

=== Filming ===
Filming started at Elstree Studios in February 1970. Forbes recalled, "My task was to avoid any patronising of the disabled, shun sentimentalising the core love story and bring out the humour which, during my research, I quickly found was characteristic of genuine paraplegics."

Forbes hired cinematographer Tony Imi on the basis of the latter's work in Cathy Comes Home. "I did not want glossy photography, I wanted utter realism," wrote Forbes.

In March it was reported Delaney left the film after a dispute with Forbes saying the latter "has made considerable changes to the script. In the absence of any real opportunity to revise these changes, I withdrew from the project." Forbes said, "I regret this very much and so does the producer." Delaney had her name removed from the credits. "It was never our intention to ask her, or try to maneuvre her, into a position where she would not have credit," said Forbes. "She felt the version was too far removed from her conception. There were no hard words. I have yet to find a film that was not changed during production. I am very sorry."

Nanette Newman later recalled:

Everybody took a cut in salary, it was done on a very small budget and we were just a little group of people in a house. It had a wonderful feeling: shots would be grabbed, you worked in what you arrived in (there were no costumes), and you had a feeling of everybody pulling together, wanting the film to be good. I have a very special feeling for that film.

=== Post-Production ===
Forbes had asked Paul McCartney to write a "sad song to play under the credits" for the film. McCartney began working on a song titled "So Sad", which later became "Another Day". However, after a test screening on July 22, 1970, McCartney was not enthusiastic about the film and wrote a note to Forbes saying that the song was not suitable for its soundtrack, so the song was not included.

Once the film was made, it was screened for executives at EMI in October 1970. They disliked it and did not want the film released. Forbes persuaded them to attend another screening, with an invited audience; this went well and secured company support. In the words of Alexander Walker, "The reaction was overwhelmingly good. Dutiful words of praise now came forth from the E.M.I. offices, though some felt they were like the words of a man who congratulates a Channel swimmer on his efforts while holding his head under water."

== Release ==
=== UK release ===
The film was released in January 1971. The Observer called it "a pleasant surprise". The Guardian said "it digs only half deep enough." However it was not a success at the box office in the UK, in part because of limited distribution.

When the film was released it was reported Forbes was preparing another film to direct, an adaptation of H.E. Bates' The Triple Echo to star Vanessa Redgrave, Jenny Agutter and Peter McEnery, to start filming in March. However, in March 1971 Forbes quit as head of EMI films although his contract did not expire until April 1972. He and Newman left for a holiday in the Bahamas, then travelled to the US to try and sell the film there.

=== US Release ===
In May the film was bought for distribution in the US by Don Rugoff who paid an advance of £41,500. "Now I feel vindicated," said Forbes. "EMI showed little faith in my picture but Rugoff has high hopes."

Rugloff spent a large amount on advertising and also paid for a new Burt Bacharach theme song, which necessitated a change in title. The American release also had two minutes cut from the wedding sequence.

=== Reception ===
Reviews were very strong in the US. The San Francisco Examiner called it "very beautiful and moving." The Los Angeles Times said it was "an exceedingly professional piece of storytelling."

Filmink argued that while the film was well made, the leads "both excellent actors, were too old: the story needed to be about young things, as in the original novel (based on the author’s own experiences)… but McDowell was an old-looking 27 and Nanette Newman in her mid 30s. I also felt it needed a little more story. Forbes blamed spotty distribution but if he’d added a third main character (a rival, say, or someone’s parent) and cast some younger, attractive, soulful actors (such as Jenny Agutter from The Railway Children), I think Moon could have had a shot."

== Legacy ==
Academy Award winner Gary Oldman chose to become an actor after watching the film, particularly because of McDowell's performance.

== Bibliography ==
- Forbes, Bryan (1993). A Divided Life: Memoirs. London: Mandarin. ISBN 978-0749308841.
