= Love Shines (album) =

Studio album by B. J. Thomas
- Released: 1983
- Genre: Gospel, Contemporary Christian
- Label: Priority
- Producer: Pete Drake

B. J. Thomas chronology
Peace in the Valley (1982)	Love Shines (1983)	New Looks (1983)

Love Shines is the twenty-ninth studio album and seventh gospel album by American singer B. J. Thomas, released in 1983.

== Track listing ==
1. "Love Shines" (Kent Robbins) - 3:04
2. "He's Got Religion" (Jerry Gillespie) - 3:27
3. "Best Friend" (Dan Hoffman, Larry Keith) - 3:26
4. "Born to Fly" (Aaron Wilburn) - 3:37
5. "They See God There" (Dan Keen, Jim Weber) - 2:57
6. "He's Coming Back in a Blaze of Glory" (Johnny Slate, Danny Morrison, Larry Keith) - 2:53
7. "Teach Me to See" (Gloria Thomas, Aaron Wilburn) - 3:32
8. "Pray for Me" (B.J. Thomas, Gloria Thomas, Aaron Wilburn) - 3:18
9. "That's What's Wrong with the World Today" (Larry Kingston, "Lathan", Gloria Thomas) - 3:11
10. "Let's All Go Down to the River" (Sue Richards, Earl Montgomery) - 2:39

== Personnel ==
Production

- Pete Drake – producer
- Randy Best – engineer
- Al Pachucki – engineer
- Bill Brunt – art direction, design
- Bill Myers – illustration
- Jim McGuire – photography

Musicians

- B.J. Thomas – vocals
- David Briggs – acoustic piano
- Bill Hullett – acoustic guitars
- Jack Solomon – acoustic guitars
- Dale Sellers – electric guitars
- Pete Drake – steel guitar
- Mike Leech – bass
- Gene Chrisman – drums
- Farrell Morris – percussion
- Charlie McCoy – harmonica
- Bergen White – horn and string arrangements
- Roger Bissell, William Puett, James "Buddy" Skipper, Denis Solee and George Tidwell – horns
- George Binkley, John David Boyle, Marvin Chantry, Roy Christensen, Carl Gorodetzky, Phyllis Hiltz, Dennis Molchan, Walter Schwede, Gary Vanosdale, Pamela Vanosdale and Stephanie Woolf – strings
- The Jordanaires – backing vocals
