= What's New Pussycat? (song) =

Single by Tom Jones

from the album What's New Pussycat?
- B-side: "The Rose"
- Released: 1965
- Genre: Traditional pop
- Length: 2:18
- Label: Decca
- Songwriters: Burt Bacharach, Hal David
- Producer: Peter Sullivan

Tom Jones UK singles chronology
"With These Hands" (1965)	"What's New Pussycat?" (1965)	"Thunderball" (1966)

Official audio
- "What's New Pussycat?" on YouTube

"What's New Pussycat?" is the theme song for the eponymous movie, written by Burt Bacharach and Hal David, and sung by Welsh singer Tom Jones. The original single included a 13-second instrumental introduction, ending in the sound of shattering glass, but later issues omitted this introduction.

Jones was skeptical about the song when first approached about it. He said when it was offered to him, he felt it was "sort of a backhanded compliment: 'I've got to have you, but this is the song.'" Jones said it took convincing from Bacharach to perform it:

"When I first heard it I thought, 'Christ! What the bloody hell do they want me to sing this for?' But Burt Bacharach explained, 'I want the big voice to sing this bloody crazy song.' And you put it on, it’s a classic."

== Chart performance ==
It was Jones' third UK top 30 record, and peaked at number 11. In the US, "What's New Pussycat?" peaked at number 3, and was Jones' second entry on the top 40. In Canada the song reached number 1. It Reached #1 on the New Zealand Lever Hit Parade.

== Accolades ==
It was nominated for the Academy Award for Best Original Song in 1966, and lost to "The Shadow of Your Smile".

== In popular culture ==
- Abe Simpson performs the song at a talent show in the 2001 The Simpsons episode "Tennis the Menace".
- In "The Salt and Pepper Diner", a track from his 2009 album The Top Part, John Mulaney recounts an anecdote from his childhood in which he and a friend pranked the titular diner's patrons by playing the song ad-nauseam using the diner's jukebox.
