= Long Ago Tomorrow =

Sheet music cover

"Long Ago Tomorrow" is a song written by Hal David and Burt Bacharach for the 1971 film Long Ago, Tomorrow. Long Ago, Tomorrow was the U.S release of a film earlier released in the U.K. as The Raging Moon. (The Raging Moon did not include the Bacharach song.) The song was recorded for the film soundtrack by B. J. Thomas in 1971, and the recording was also released as Scepter Records single SCE 12335 the same year.

== Chart performance ==
In the US, "Long Ago Tomorrow" reached No. 61 on the Billboard Hot 100 and No. 13 on the Easy Listening chart.
