= Raindrops Keep Fallin' on My Head =

1969 song written by Burt Bacharach and Hal David

- From the motion picture, Butch Cassidy and the Sundance Kid

Single by B. J. Thomas

from the album Raindrops Keep Fallin' on My Head
- B-side: "Never Had It So Good"
- Released: October 1969
- Recorded: 1969
- Studio: A & R (New York City)
- Genre: Pop; soft rock
- Length: 3:02
- Label: Scepter
- Songwriters: Burt Bacharach; Hal David
- Producers: Burt Bacharach; Hal David

B. J. Thomas singles chronology
"Pass the Apple Eve" (1969)	"Raindrops Keep Fallin' on My Head" (1969)	"Everybody's Out of Town" (1970)

Audio
- The Original "Raindrops Keep Fallin' on My Head" on YouTube

"Raindrops Keep Fallin' on My Head" is a song written by Burt Bacharach and Hal David for the 1969 film Butch Cassidy and the Sundance Kid. The uplifting lyrics describe somebody who overcomes his troubles and worries by realizing that "it won't be long till happiness steps up to greet me."

The single by B. J. Thomas reached No. 1 on charts in the United States, Canada and Norway, and reached No. 38 on the UK Singles Chart. It topped the Billboard Hot 100 for four weeks in January 1970 and was also the first American No. 1 hit of the 1970s. The song also spent seven weeks atop the Billboard Adult Contemporary chart. Billboard ranked it as the No. 4 song of 1970. According to Billboard magazine, it had sold over 2 million copies by March 14, 1970, with eight-track and cassette versions also climbing the charts. It won an Academy Award for Best Original Song. Bacharach also won Best Original Score.

== Composition and recording ==
Bacharach and David composed the song for Butch Cassidy and the Sundance Kid. Director George Roy Hill wanted something for a particular scene involving a romantic bike ride. Ray Stevens was first offered the opportunity to record it for the film, but turned it down. Bob Dylan is supposed to have been approached for the song, but he reportedly declined too. Carol Kaye played electric bass on the song.

B. J. Thomas accepted the offer to record the song, and he recorded the version heard in the film in seven takes, after Bacharach expressed dissatisfaction with the first six. Thomas had been recovering from laryngitis, which made his voice sound huskier. The film version featured a separate vaudeville-style instrumental break in double time while Paul Newman performed bicycle stunts. Two weeks later Thomas re-recorded the song at A & R Studio in New York City for its single release.

== Reception ==
Some felt the song was the wrong tone for a western film like Butch Cassidy and the Sundance Kid, but Hill insisted on its inclusion. Robert Redford, one of the stars of the film, was among those who disapproved of using the song, though he later acknowledged he was wrong:

When the film was released, I was highly critical: How did the song fit with the film? There was no rain. At the time, it seemed like a dumb idea. How wrong I was, as it turned out to be a giant hit.

== Legacy ==
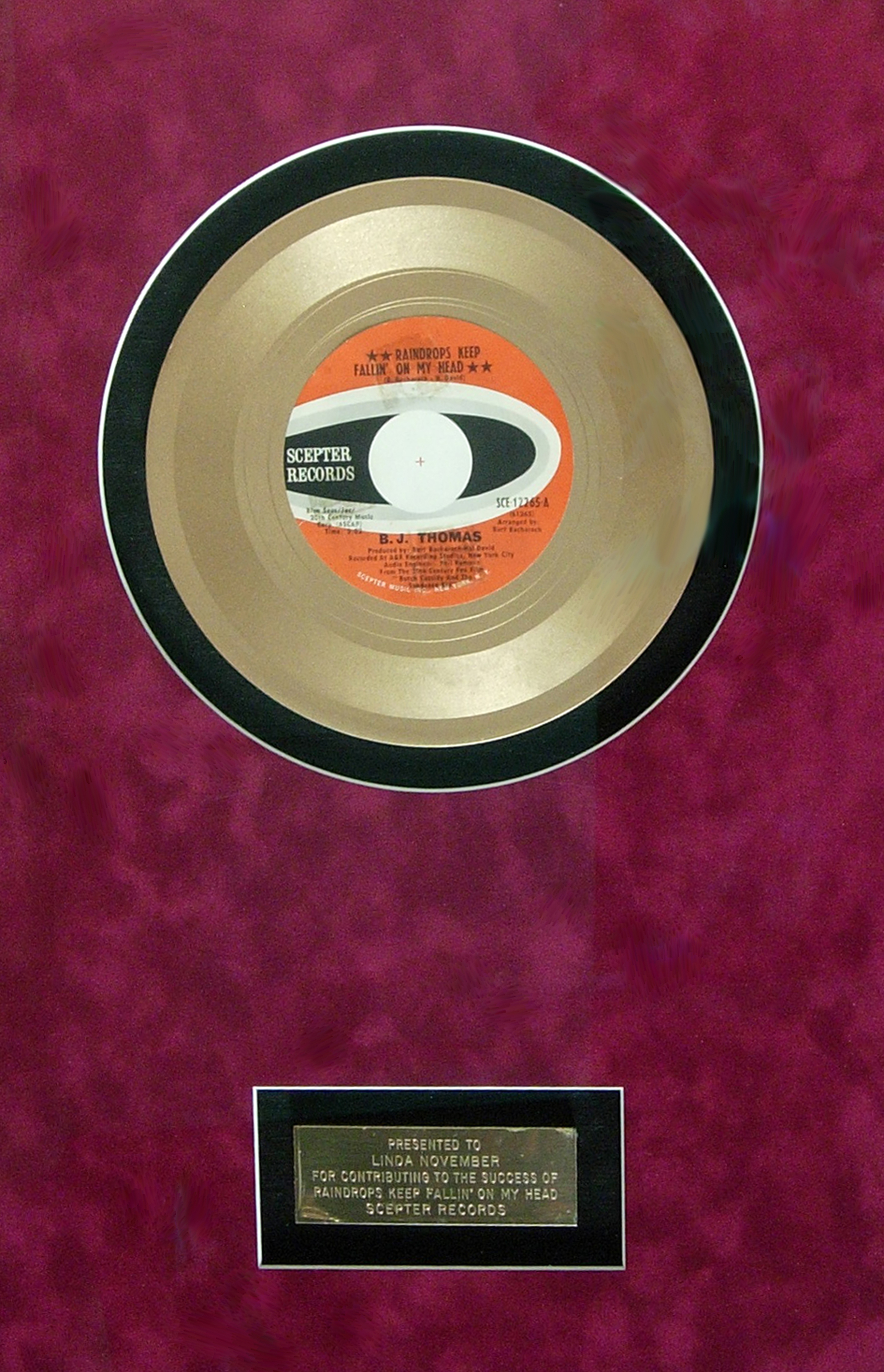
Gold record presented to backup singer Linda November for her work on "Raindrops Keep Fallin' on My Head"

In 2004, it finished at number 23 on AFI's 100 Years...100 Songs survey of top tunes in American cinema. In 2008, the single was ranked 85th on Billboard's Hot 100 All-Time Top Songs and placed 95th in the 55th Anniversary edition of the All-Time Hot 100 list in 2013. Billboard Magazine also ranked the song 15th on its Top 50 Movie Songs of All Time list in 2014.

The song, initially when it came out, I believe it was October of 69, the movie didn't come out until December, it did get some bad reviews. It was a very unique and different sounding song, Bacharach and David never had any qualms about trying to do anything different, or push the envelope so to speak. So nowadays, it sounds pretty tame, but back then, radio resisted it to some degree. But, when the movie came out it hit hugely and sold about 200,000 to 300,000 records a day [and continued selling] for about three years.

— B.J. Thomas, Interview, Pods o' Pop (August 22, 2011)

On December 3, 2013, the National Academy of Recording Arts and Sciences announced that the single would be inducted into the 2014 Grammy Hall of Fame.

== Charts ==
=== Weekly singles charts ===
B. J. Thomas version
Chart (1969–1970)	Peak position
Argentinian Singles Chart	1
Australian Singles Chart	20
Austria (Ö3 Austria Top 40)	11
Belgium (Ultratop 50 Wallonia)	28
Canada Top Singles (RPM)	1
Canada Adult Contemporary (RPM)	1
French Singles Chart	56
Germany (GfK)	40
Ireland (IRMA)	9
Italian Singles Chart	31
Mexican Singles Chart	1
Netherlands (Single Top 100)	21
New Zealand Singles Chart	3
Norway (VG-lista)	1
Singapore Singles Chart	1
South African Singles Chart	2
UK Singles (Official Charts)	38
US Billboard Hot 100	1
US Adult Contemporary (Billboard)	1
US Cash Box Top 100	1

Johnny Farnham version
Chart (1970)	Peak position
Australian Singles Chart	1

=== Year-end charts ===
Chart (1970)	Rank
Canada RPM Top Singles	6
South Africa	17
US Billboard Hot 100	4
US Cash Box Top 100	13

=== All-time charts ===
Chart (1958-2018)	Position
US Billboard Hot 100	107

== Certifications and sales ==
Region	Certification	Certified units/sales
Canada (Music Canada)	Gold	100,000
United States (RIAA)	Gold	2,000,000
Summaries
Worldwide	—	3,000,000

== In popular culture ==
- It was mentioned in a candidate's name in the Monty Python's Flying Circus Election Night Special sketch in the "It's a Living" episode in 1970.
- The song was used in the background of a montage in Spider-Man 2, where Peter Parker decides to opt out of being a superhero after he loses his powers.
- The song was used in the background of a montage in the Family Guy episode "Encyclopedia Griffin" (2015).
- The song was used in the outro sequence of The Simpsons in episode 16 of season 4, "Duffless", as a reference to Butch Cassidy and the Sundance Kid (1969).
- The song is used extensively throughout Hideo Kojima's 2025 video game Death Stranding 2: On the Beach, both as non-diegetic background music in scenes and being sung by characters in-universe.
- The song (the Bobbie Gentry version specifically) plays during Final Destination Bloodlines during the premonition scene.

== Cover versions ==
- In 1970, the song was covered by Roy Ayers, with his group the Roy Ayers Ubiquity, on their album Ubiquity, as the second track.
- Peggy Lee on her album Bridge Over Troubled Water, released by Capitol Records.
- Barbara Mason, whose cover reached U.S. Bubbling Under number 12 and R&B number 38.
- John Farnham, whose version was the number-one hit (for seven weeks) in Australia on the Go-Set National Top 40 from January 24 to March 13.
- Bobbie Gentry, from her album Fancy, which reached number 40 in the UK chart.
- Robert Goulet on his album Robert Goulet Sings Today's Greatest Hits.
- Perry Como on his album It's Impossible.
- Brazilian singer Wilson Simonal on his album Mexico '70.
- Sacha Distel, in French as "Toute la pluie tombe sur moi" (All the rain falls on me), while his English-language version was a number 10 hit in the UK Singles Chart, and number 13 in Ireland; the French version reaching number 10 in his home country. Distel also recorded a version in Italian, "Gocce di pioggia su di me" (Raindrops on me).
- The same Italian translation was performed by Patty Pravo on the 1970 album of the same name (RCA Italiana- LP8S 21102).
- Portuguese-born television and radio presenter Pedro Biker released a Danish version re-entitled "Regndråber Drypper I Mit Hår".
- Swedish singer Siw Malmkvist in Swedish as "Regnet, det bara öser ner" (The rain just pours down). It peaked at #5 in the Swedish best selling chart "Kvällstoppen".
- Dionne Warwick, for the album I'll Never Fall in Love Again.
- In 1973, the Barry Sisters covered the song in a Yiddish version ("Trop'ns Fin Regen Oif Mein Kop") on their album Our Way.
- The 1995 cover version by Welsh rock band Manic Street Preachers is credited with adding greater nuance to the song, the Financial Times citing their recording as transforming the song from carefree optimism to "an exhortation to keep going in the face of tragedy", and noting that singer James Dean Bradfield's voice "added grit to the facile lyric". The group often spent their downtime on the tour bus watching the film Butch Cassidy and the Sundance Kid, and incorporated the song into live sets. After the disappearance of lyricist Richey Edwards, the band decided to continue rather than split up. Having booked studio time in France to record their fourth album, Everything Must Go (1996), they were invited to record for the War Child charity album The Help Album (1995). The project required all songs to be recorded in one day. While band biographer Simon Price has described the recording and release of the record as a "coded message" that the band still existed, Bradfield recalls the events differently: "...us putting it out wasn't planned as us saying 'We're OK, guys!', but the deadline was the next day after we'd arrived in this place, for some kind of new beginning." The band's recorded version of the song contains the first recorded instance of drummer Sean Moore performing on trumpet, and also appears on their 2003 B-sides and rarities compilation album Lipstick Traces (A Secret History of Manic Street Preachers). The Manics further reference the film Butch Cassidy and the Sundance Kid with the B-side "Sepia".
- in 1998, Ben Folds Five took part in Bacharach's 'One Amazing Night' tribute concert and covered the song.
- Lisa Miskovsky covered the song in the extended version of her self-titled (2004) album.
- Mel Tormé covered the song as the title track of his 1969 studio album Raindrops Keep Fallin' on My Head.
- Johnny Mathis covered the song on his album Raindrops Keep Fallin' on My Head (1970).
- Dean Martin released a cover version of the song on his album For the Good Times (1971).

== See also ==
- List of number-one singles in Australia during the 1970s
- List of RPM number-one singles of 1970
- List of number-one hits of 1970 (Mexico)
- List of number-one hits in Norway
- List of number-one adult contemporary singles of 1969 (U.S.)
- List of number-one adult contemporary singles of 1970 (U.S.)
- List of Hot 100 number-one singles of 1970 (U.S.)
