= B. J. Thomas =

American singer (1942–2021)

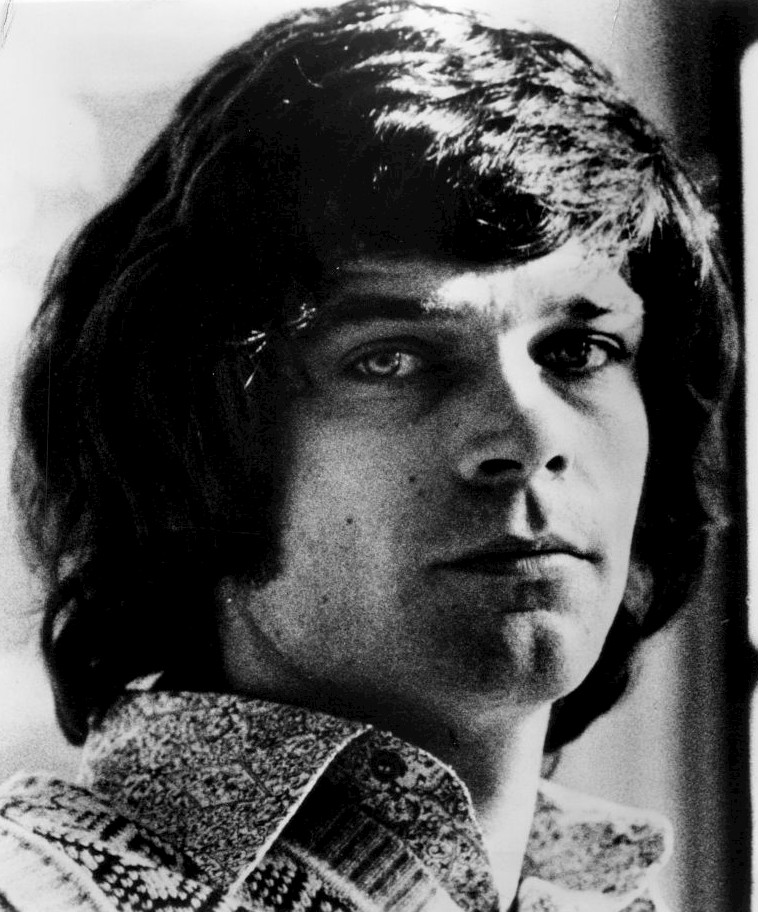
- Thomas in March 1972

Background information
- Born: Billy Joe Thomas; August 7, 1942; Hugo, Oklahoma, U.S.
- Origin: Houston, Texas
- Died: May 29, 2021 (aged 78) Arlington, Texas, U.S.
- Genres: Country, contemporary Christian, pop, rock
- Occupations: Singer
- Instruments: Vocals
- Years active: 1966–2021
- Labels: Scepter, Myrrh, Columbia, Paramount Records, MCA
- Spouse: Gloria Richardson (m. 1968)
- Website: bjthomas.com

Billy Joe Thomas (August 7, 1942 – May 29, 2021) was an American singer widely known for his country, contemporary Christian, and pop hits of the 1960s, 1970s, and 1980s.

Popular songs by Thomas include "Hooked on a Feeling" (1968), "Raindrops Keep Fallin' on My Head" (1969), "(Hey Won't You Play) Another Somebody Done Somebody Wrong Song" (1975), "Don't Worry Baby" (1977), and "Whatever Happened to Old-Fashioned Love" (1983).

In 2014, "Raindrops Keep Fallin' on My Head" was inducted into the Grammy Hall of Fame.

== Early life and education ==
Billy Joe Thomas was born in Hugo, Oklahoma, on August 7, 1942. He was the son of Geneva and Vernon Thomas. Thomas grew up both in and near Houston; he graduated from Lamar Consolidated High School in Rosenberg, Texas.

He sang in a church choir in his teens and later joined the musical group The Triumphs with Tim Griffith (lead guitar), Tom Griffith (bass), Denver "Zeke" Zatyka (keyboards), Don Drachenberg (vocal and sax), and Ted Mensik (drums). During his senior year, Thomas made friends with Roy Head of Roy Head and The Traits. The Traits and the Triumphs held several Battle of the Bands events in the early 1960s.

== Music career ==
=== 1960s–1970s ===
In 1966, Thomas and the Triumphs released the album I'm So Lonesome I Could Cry (Pacemaker Records), featuring a hit cover version of the Hank Williams song "I'm So Lonesome I Could Cry". The single sold over one million copies and was awarded a gold disc. The follow-up single, "Mama", peaked at No. 22. In the same year, Thomas released a solo album of the same title on the Scepter Records label. Thomas achieved mainstream success again in 1968, with the song "The Eyes of a New York Woman". Five months later, the more successful single "Hooked on a Feeling" featured the sound of Reggie Young's electric sitar; it was first released on the album On My Way via Scepter Records. "Hooked on a Feeling" became Thomas' second million-selling record.

A year later, Butch Cassidy and the Sundance Kid featured Thomas performing the Bacharach/David song "Raindrops Keep Fallin' on My Head", which won the Academy Award for best original song that year. The song reached No. 1 on the Billboard Hot 100 in January 1970. Its sales exceeded one million copies, with Thomas being awarded his third gold record. The song was also released on an album of the same title. His other hits of the 1970s included: "Everybody's Out of Town", "I Just Can't Help Believing" (it reached No. 9 in 1970 and was covered by Elvis Presley), "No Love at All", "Mighty Clouds of Joy", and "Rock and Roll Lullaby".

"Thomas never turned rock and roller because he was, and is, a country singer. And like most, he does better with the real stuff—'No Love at All' comes close for a pop song and he broke with a Hank Williams cover—than with Bacharach/David."

— Christgau's Record Guide: Rock Albums of the Seventies (1981)

After experiencing hits with Scepter Records, his label for six years, Thomas left the label in 1972. He was with Paramount Records from 1973 to 1974; during that time he released Songs (1973) and Longhorns & Londonbridges (1974). In 1975, Thomas released the album Reunion on ABC Records, which had absorbed the Paramount label. It contained "(Hey Won't You Play) Another Somebody Done Somebody Wrong Song", which was the longest-titled No. 1 hit ever on the Hot 100. It was his first big hit since 1972 and secured him his fourth gold record. According to the Arlington Historical Society, Thomas' music career from 1966 to 1977 was his heyday as a pop star. In 1976, Thomas released Home Where I Belong, produced by Chris Christian on Myrrh Records, the first of several gospel albums. It was the first Christian album to go platinum, and Thomas became one of the biggest contemporary Christian musical artists of the period. After his performance at Elvis Presley's 1977 memorial service, Thomas would continue to record and tour extensively, but primarily on the gospel circuit, with forays into the country music scene. Thomas embraced his newfound faith, but sometimes clashed with fundamentalist Christian fans because he still performed his previous popular hits.

On MCA Records, Thomas and Chris Christian recorded his last Top 40 hit single, "Don't Worry Baby". It appeared on his last pop album, which also included the adult contemporary hit "Still the Lovin' Is Fun".

=== 1980s–2010s ===
During the 1980s, Thomas had little success on the pop charts, but some of his singles topped the country singles chart. Two of those songs included "Whatever Happened to Old-Fashioned Love" and "New Looks from an Old Lover" in 1983. Additionally, "Two Car Garage" reached No. 3 on the country charts. In 1981, on his 39th birthday, Thomas became the 60th member of the Grand Ole Opry. His Opry membership later lapsed, with the Opry classifying him as a non-regular "guest artist". He scored another hit, recording "As Long as We Got Each Other", the theme song for the television series Growing Pains. The first-season theme was a solo for Thomas; it was re-recorded as a duet with Jennifer Warnes for the second and third seasons. For the show's fourth season, it was re-recorded with British singer Dusty Springfield, however the Thomas/Warnes version was used for season five and part of season seven. Thomas first released the track on his 1985 album Throwing Rocks at the Moon via Columbia Records.

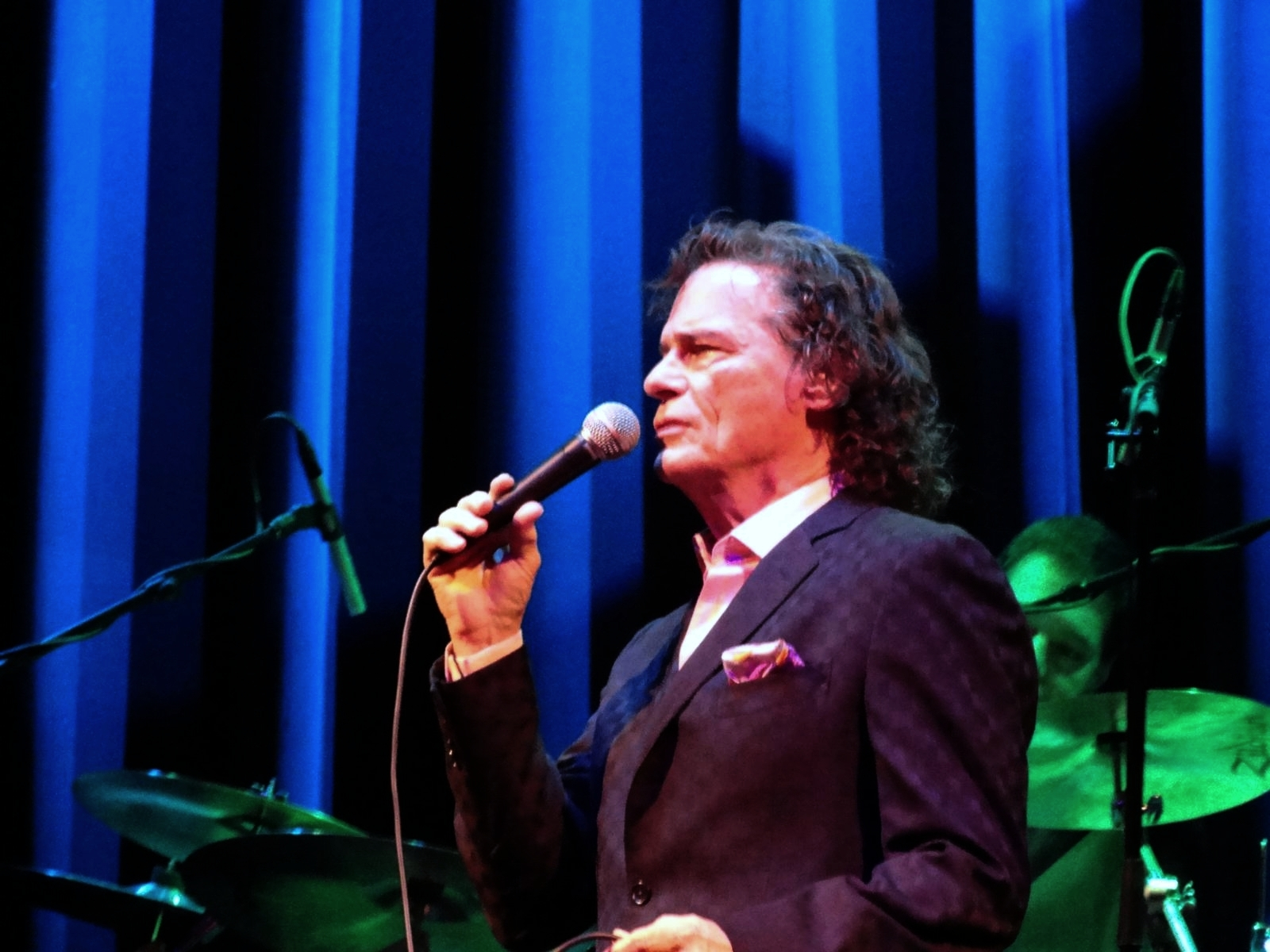
Thomas in December 2012

Thomas also wrote two books, including the autobiography Home Where I Belong and starred in the movies Jory and Jake's Corner. Several commercial jingles including ones for Coca-Cola, Pepsi and Bell Telephone, have featured him singing and his music. On December 31, 2011, Thomas was the featured halftime performer at the 2011 Hyundai Sun Bowl in El Paso, Texas. On April 2, 2013, he released The Living Room Sessions, an album with acoustic arrangements of well-known hits. It featured guest appearances with established and emerging vocalists, accompanying Thomas on seven of the album's twelve tracks.

On December 3, 2013, the National Academy of Recording Arts and Sciences announced that the 1969 single "Raindrops Keep Fallin' on My Head" by Thomas would be inducted into the 2014 Grammy Hall of Fame.

== Personal life and death ==
Thomas married singer-songwriter Gloria Richardson in December 1968. They had three daughters: Paige (born in 1970), Nora (adopted from Seoul, South Korea in 1978), and Erin (born in 1979).

Shortly after his career began, Thomas became dependent on drugs and alcohol, which led to bankruptcy and his marriage nearly ending. On January 28, 1976, he became a Christian less than a month after Gloria did. Most press sources indicated that Thomas had been sober since he and Gloria reconciled in 1976.

On March 23, 2021, Thomas announced via his official Facebook page that he was diagnosed with stage IV lung cancer and was being treated in Texas. He died two months later, on May 29, at his home in Arlington, Texas, at the age of 78.

== Selected discography ==
- On My Way (1968)
- Longhorns & Londonbridges (1974)
- Reunion (1975)
- You Gave Me Love (When Nobody Gave Me a Prayer) (1979)
- Love Shines (1983)
- Love to Burn (2007)
- The Living Room Sessions (2013)

== Awards and nominations ==
| Year | Association | Category | Work | Result | Ref. |
|---|---|---|---|---|---|
| 1970 | Grammy Awards | Best Male Pop Vocal Performance | "Raindrops Keep Fallin' on My Head" | Nominated | |
| 1975 | Country Music Association | Single of the Year | "(Hey Won't You Play) Another Somebody Done Somebody Wrong Song" | Nominated | |
| 1976 | GMA Dove Awards | Album by a Secular Artist | Home Where I Belong | Won | |
| 1977 | Grammy Awards | Best Inspirational Performance | Home Where I Belong | Won | |
| 1978 | Grammy Awards | Best Inspirational Performance | Happy Man | Won | |
| 1979 | Grammy Awards | Best Inspirational Performance | You Gave Me Love (When Nobody Gave Me a Prayer) | Won | |
| 1980 | Grammy Awards | Best Gospel Performance, Contemporary; With Reba Rambo, Dony McGuire, The Archers, Cynthia Clawson, Andrae Crouch, Tramaine Hawkins & Walter Hawkins | The Lord's Prayer | Won | |
| 1981 | Grammy Awards | Best Inspirational Performance | Amazing Grace | Won | |
| 1981 | GMA Dove Awards | Album by a Secular Artist | Amazing Grace | Won | |
| 2014 | NARAS | Grammy Hall of Fame Award | "Raindrops Keep Fallin' on My Head" | Won | |
