= Cindy Valentine =

Italian-Canadian musician, actress, and composer

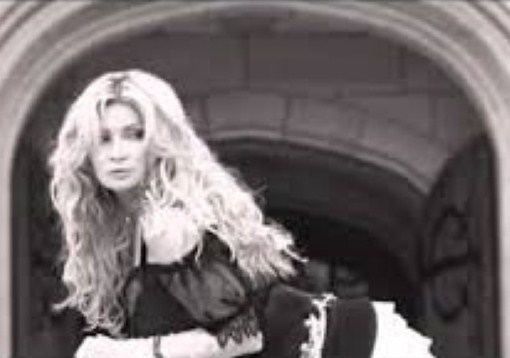
- "Le Derrière" (2013)

Background information
- Also known as: Cindy Valentine; Valentine Leone
- Born: Valentine Cinzia Leone; Italy
- Origin: Toronto, Ontario, Canada
- Genres: Dance-pop; rock
- Occupations: Singer; actress; composer; producer
- Instruments: Vocals; keyboards; percussion
- Years active: 1984–present
- Labels: Sony; Polygram; BMG; RCA; Arista; Atlantic; A&M; Polydor; CBS Columbia Records
- Website: Official website

Cindy Valentine (Valentine Cinzia Leone) is an Italian-born composer, producer, actress and performing artist, raised in Toronto, Ontario, Canada who is now a U.S. citizen, residing primarily in New York, New York. Valentine hit the Billboard Dance/Club charts in 1989 with "Secret Rendez-Vous" and "Pick Up the Pieces (To My Heart)", both songs co-written by Tony Green and Cindy Valentine. Valentine also co-wrote the songs, "Finest Hour" and "Never Gonna Be the Same Again" for the 1989 Halloween classic, Teen Witch and played the part of Shana the Rock Star in the film. As a composer and performer, additional soundtrack credits include: Repossessed (1990), Mannequin Two: On the Move (1991), and Another 9 1/2 Weeks (1997).

== Early life ==
Valentine studied music at The Royal Conservatory of Music in Toronto at the age of 7, Valentine entered a singing contest, winning first place and a month of opera training at the Il conservatorio Di Milano, Italy under Claudio Villa.Juno Award-winning composer and producer, Tony Green was present at one of the Milan recording sessions and took note of Valentine's talent. Green had already been to the top of the charts for his Billboard Hot Dance Club Play number-one single, "Come to Me", performed by France Joli. Valentine signed with Green as her producer under the CBS Columbia Records label in 1984. Valentine Leone took the stage name Cindy Valentine, curiously missing the Leone surname she shares with the family patriarch, famed Spaghetti Western director Sergio Leone.

== Career ==
During her six years as a lead vocalist with CBS, PolyGram and Arista Records, Valentine remained engaged with the creative process. A formally trained pianist, Valentine also contributed percussion, keyboards, and backup vocals, in addition to song writing on her records. After, "Secret Rendez-vous" and "Pickup The Pieces (To My Heart)" made the Billboard charts, Alisha (RCA), Lori Ruso (Capitol) and European singer C. C. Catch (Polygram) recorded songs composed by Valentine. A guest appearance on Jellybean Benitez's Spillin' The Beans (Atlantic Records, 1990) was Valentine's last appearance on a major record label before moving her career toward soundtrack and film.

In addition to various acting roles, Valentine's early soundtrack credits include Teen Witch (1989), co-composing two signature songs in the film with Larry Weir, Teen Witch has become a cable television and midnight-theater Halloween favorite. Valentine co-wrote the title song for Repossessed (1990) with Charles Fox, and her hit single "Pickup The Pieces (To My Heart)" appears in the film Mannequin Two: On the Move (1991). For much of the 1990s into 2003, Valentine worked behind the scenes in film and television, as a composer and musician. Composer Dominic Messinger and Valentine teamed in 1997, with credited works for the sequel to Mickey Rourke's Another 9 1/2 Weeks, and the television series As the World Turns and Sirens.

- Broadcast Music, Inc.s author's database credits Valentine with 107 (ASCAP) published works as of October 30, 2012.
- Valentine is a voting member of the National Academy of Recording Arts and Sciences Grammy Awards as of 2009.
- In 2013, Valentine made several worst dressed lists at the red carpet appearance of the 55th annual Grammys in a rock-star styled ringleader's outfit.
- In many recent instances, Valentine is credited as Valentine Leone.

Since 2000, Valentine has involved herself with horror, documentary and art genre films, such as the critically acclaimed 4Chosen: The Documentary (2008) and is credited as Producer on Ruth (2000) and co-executive producer on Souvenir Views (2003). She is an occasional television host on Time Warner's, New York City, local interest show, On the Beat, and hosted the documentary film Lisa Loeb Songwriting: Just Like You (2008), about a song-writing workshop, featuring Lisa Loeb and a girl's fourth-grade class, composing a new song. Valentine appears as Luisa in the comedy The Great Chameleon (2012), starring Stacy Keach and Robert Davi.

=== Discography ===
==== Rock and Roll Heart Attack ====
Valentine's first album, Rock & Roll Heart Attack (1984), had three singles released from the album, "Victim", "Make It Through the Night" and "Big Kiss". The majority of the songs on the album were written by Valentine's manager, Tony Green. Valentine co-wrote the song "Lust" with Aubrey Singer and Lorne Ould and was the sole composer of the song "Using Me".

Michael Damian played the part of the love-interest in the music video for the song "Victim", with Valentine singing and playing the lead role.

==== Secret Rendez-Vous ====
"Secret Rendez-vous" (October 10, 1987)	Peak position
Billboard Hot Dance Club Songs	43

Valentine's 1987 album was a departure from rock and roll into the dance and club music genre, Secret Rendez-Vous was released in Canada by Polygram. Valentine co-wrote on many of the songs, provided keyboards and percussion in addition to lead and backup vocals. "Secret Rendez-vous", spent two weeks on Billboard's Dance/Club chart, peaking at #43 on October 10, 1987. An additional single, "In Your Midnight Hour", was also released from the Secret Rendez-vous album in 1987.

==== "Pickup the Pieces (To My Heart)" ====
"Pickup the Pieces (To My Heart)" (November 4, 1989)	Peak position
Billboard Hot Dance Club Songs	11

"Pick Up the Pieces (To My Heart)", was released as a single under Arista Records in 1989. "Pickup The Pieces (To My Heart)" climbed the Dance / Club charts, ending its 16-week run at #11.

- "Pickup the Pieces (To My Heart)" was featured in the 1991 film Mannequin Two: On the Move and HBO's Just Can't Get Enough (2002).

An Arista debut album was planned but never materialized. These sessions are known as the lost album. Which were later released by Valentine as Mp3 albums.

==== Spillin' The Beans ====
Valentine is a featured artist on Jellybean Benitez's album Spillin' The Beans (Atlantic Records, 1990). Valentine's lead vocals from the CD included "What's Up", "Not This Time" and "Don't Let Love Come Between Us".

==== Valentine's World Of Music ====
Blame Yourself (2008) is a digital download, 13 track LP, the freshman release for Valentine's World Of Music.

Speak Your Mind (2009) is a digital download, 13 track LP of previously unreleased titles.

"Le Derrière" (2013) is a single, featuring Cindy Valentine and rapper REW***. The song was produced by Valentine and co-written with W. Nome and E. Talavara.

"Wicked Ways" (2013), is a single, solely composed by Valentine and released Oct 1, 2013.

- "Wicked Ways" debuted at #3 for Most Added Dance/Crossover Tracks hit on DJ Times Magazine.
- #22 on DJ Times National Club Charts — December 13, 2013.
- #15 on DJ Times National Dance/Crossover Chart January 16, 2014.
- A video for "Wicked Ways" will be shot in late November 2013 and released in 2014.

==== Compositions released by other artists ====
Valentine compositions released by other artists
Year	Artist	Song	Album	Label	Writers	Notes
1987	Alisha	"Into the Night"	Nightwalkin	RCA	T. Green, C. Valentine
1988	Kristin Baio	"Don't Turn Your Back On Love"	Don't Turn Your Back On Love	A&M Records	T. Green, C. Valentine
1989	C. C. Catch	"Midnight Hour"	Hear What I Say	PolyGram Metronome Records	T. Green, C. Valentine
1989	C. C. Catch	"Midnight Hour"	Midnight Hour (single)	PolyGram Metronome Records	T. Green, C. Valentine
1989	Jessica Zayno	"Hot Latin Lover"	Hot Latin Lover (single)	Autograph Records	T. Green, C. Valentine
1990	Lori Ruso	"Never Gonna Be the Same Again"	Show Off	Capitol Records	L.Weir, C.Valentine
2007	Sara Niemietz	"Finest Hour"	Finest Hour (single)	Caption Records	L.Weir, C.Valentine
2007	Heather Youmans	"Never Gonna Be the Same Again"	Teen Witch the Musical	Caption Records	L.Weir, C.Valentine
2017	Emily Perry	"Boom"	(single)	Dauman Music	Emily Perry, Cindy Valentine, Carlos Battey, William Nieves Jr, Jules and Miles O’Keefe	Billboard #9
2018	Emily Perry	"Walk In Silence"	(single)	Dauman Music	Emily Perry, Cindy Valentine, Joe Cruz	Billboard #13
2018	Emily Perry	"Summer On Lock"	(single)	Dauman Music	Damon Elliott, Emily Perry, Cindy Valentine	Billboard #9

=== Filmography ===
==== Acting ====
A music video for the 1984 single "Victim" starred Valentine with a young Michael Damian as the heart-breaker in the story. Damien would go on to play the character of Danny Romalotti on the daytime television series The Young and the Restless. Valentine would also appear in episode 39 of the CBS television series Night Heat in 1986.

The Pink Chiquitas (1987): Valentine appeared in the Sci-fi comedy film, The Pink Chiquitas, featuring Frank Stallone and Eartha Kitt. Valentine played Stella Dumbrowski, a competent teenage intern working in the weather department.

Drop Out Mother (1988): Valentine was cast as a superstar named Virgin, in the made-for-TV movie Drop-out Mother with Valerie Harper and Wayne Rogers in the starring roles.

Teen Witch (1989): Valentine appeared as Shana the Rock Star and co-wrote two signature songs for the movie, Teen Witch, with composer Larry Weir. The song "Finest Hour" would be played during plot climax and "Never Gonna Be the Same Again" would open the film and play during the plot resolution. There are two popular versions of the song, "Never Gonna Be The Same Again", Valentine's live performance on-camera version and Lori Ruso's off-camera version which opens the film.

Sunset Heat (alternate title: Midnight Heat 1992): Valentine played the part of Holly in John Nicolella's 1992 feature film, Sunset Heat, starring Michael Paré, Adam Ant and Dennis Hopper.

Skins (alternate title: Gang Boys 1994): Starring, Wings Hauser, Linda Blair and Cole Hauser, credited as Valentine Leone for her part in Dream Sex Sequence.

The Lesson (2000): a short drama, filmed in black and white, with Valentine playing the part of Angela, starring Cindy Valentine, Tracy Metro and Corbin Timbrook.

Bruco (2005): A feature-length film, written and directed by Antonio D'Alfonso, starring Frank A. Caruso, Jennifer Dale and Cindy Valentine.

The Gentleman (2007): Directed by Joe Valenti, starring Jon Doscher, Rachael Robbins and Monica Leigh, Valentine was cast as Stacy.

Lisa Loeb Songwriting: Just Like You (2008): Valentine is the segment hosts for this documentary which features Lisa Loeb spending a day with a girl's fourth grade class composing a song. Starring Cindy Valentine, Lisa Loeb and Athena Reich. Directed by Joe Valenti.

On the Beat (2009): Guest host for Time Warner's New York City local interest program On the Beat.

The Great Chameleon (2012): Directed by Goran Kalezic, Valentine plays the part of Luisa, starring Victor Altomare, Stacy Keach and Robert Davi.

==== Soundtrack ====
===== Film =====
Cindy Valentine Soundtrack
Year	Film title	Capacity	Composition	Credit	Notes
1989	Teen Witch	Song Writer Performer	"Finest Hour" "Never Gonna be the Same Again"	C. Valentine	MGM; Trans World Entertainment
1990	Repossessed	Song Writer Performer	"Repossessed"	Charles Fox, C. Valentine	Carolco Pictures
1991	Mannequin Two: On the Move	Song Writer Performer	"Pick Up the Pieces (To My Heart)"	T. Green, C. Valentine	HBO
1997	Another 9 1/2 Weeks	Song Writer Performer	"Please"	D. Meissinger, C. Valentine	Trimark Pictures
2000	Ruth	Composer, Sound; Executive producer	Music and Score	C. Valentine	Coyote Productions
2002	Just Can't Get Enough	Song Writer Performer	"Pick Up the Pieces (To My Heart)"	T. Green, C. Valentine	HBO
2002	BackFlash	Original Music	Composer	C. Wurtz, C. Valentine	Paragon Film Group
2003	Hellborn (Asylum of the Damned)	Composer	Original Score	S. Bauman and C. Valentine	Paragon Film Group
2003	Souvenir Views	Composer	Original Music	L. Gallo, C. Valentine, S. Plant	Izar Productions Inc.
2005	Remedy	Song Writer Performer	"I Swear" "Change" "We All Fall Down"	C. Bradford, C. Valentine; S. Bauman, C. Valentine; C. Valentine	Arthur J. Nascarella; Christian Maelen; Jon Doscher
2005	Bruco	Composer	"Doomed" "A Long Road"	C. Valentine	Antonio D'Alfonso
2005	The Bartender	Song Writer Performer	"Say a Prayer" "The Peaceful Chant"	C. Valentine	Goran Kalezic
2007	The Gentleman	Music Supervisor	—	Music: Jonathan Brodi	Starline Films
2008	4Chosen: The Documentary	Song Writer Performer	"No Justice, No Piece" featuring Apocolips	C.Valentine	Garden State Film Festival; Best Documentary Short
2012	Antigone	Composer	Original Music	C. Valentine	Antonio D'Alfonso

===== Television =====
Daytime television

- The Bold and the Beautiful CBS

"Someone To Count On" performed by Cindy Valentine, co-written with Dominic Messinger
"One Beat Away" performed by Jennifer Finnegan, written by C.Valentine and M. Mattioli

- The Young and the Restless CBS

"Pick Up The Pieces" performed by Cindy Valentine, co-written with Tony Green

- Another World NBC

"Streets Are My Destiny"
Someone to Count On"

performed by Cindy Valentine, co-written with Dominic Messinger

- Sunset Beach NBC

"I'm Not The Jury"
"Walk Away"

performed by Cindy Valentine, co-written with Dominic Messinger

Prime-time television

- Sirens

"Calibria de Core"
"Turn it Out"
"Speak Your Mind"
"Secret Rendez-vous"
"Party"

_{Composed and performed by Cindy Valentine}

- Due South (CTV Canada, CBS USA) Episode "Juliet is Bleeding"

"Ghost of a Feeling"

Performed by Cindy Valentine co-written with Jud Friedman

==== Producer ====
Ruth (2000) short film

Written and directed by, Richard Bairos
Produced and production by, C. Valentine Leone
Music and mixing by, C. Valentine Leone
5th Annual Los Angeles Film Festival
Universal Pictures

Souvenir Views (2003), a 22-minute documentary, starring Marc Larre Miranda

Written and directed by, Begonya Plaza
Co-executive producer, C. Valentine Leone
Original music by Larry Gallo, Cindy Valentine Leone, Sarah Plant.
Tribeca Film Festival and Festival 2003
Festival Internacional del Nuevo Cine Latinoamericano de La Habana in Havana, Cuba, 2004 in Gerona, Spain.
Izar Productions Inc.

== Advocacy ==
- Diabetes Foundation
- North Shore Animal Hospital
