= Rock & Roll Heart Attack =

Studio album by Cindy Valentine
- Released: 1984 and 2007
- Recorded: 1984
- Genre: Pop rock
- Length: 42:11
- Label: CBS Columbia Records (Vinyl); Magada Records (CD re-release)
- Producer: Tony Green

Cindy Valentine chronology
Rock & Roll Heart Attack	Secret Rendez-Vous

Singles from Rock & Roll Heart Attack
- 1. "Victim"; 2. "Make It Through the Night"; 3. "Big Kiss"

Rock & Roll Heart Attack is Cindy Valentine's debut album. The Canadian prodigy released Rock & Roll Heart Attack on vinyl with CBS Columbia Records in 1984. Valentine's subsequent work is featured in the title track of the film Repossessed (1990). Mannequin Two: On the Move (1991) features Valentine's single "Pick Up The Pieces (To My Heart)"; her song "Please" appears in the soundtrack of Love in Paris/Another 9½ Weeks (1997). Valentine starred as Shana the Rock Star in Teen Witch (1989), where she co-wrote and performed the songs "Never Gonna Be The Same Again" and "Finest Hour".

Valentine is Italian born and was raised in Canada. She is a classically trained, solo singer, composer, pianist and percussionist who is now a U.S. citizen and works as a composer in the film and television industry.

== Background ==
Rock And Roll Heart Attack produced three singles: "Victim", "Make It Through the Night" and "Big Kiss". A music video titled Victim, starring Cindy Valentine and Michael Damian was produced to support the album. Rock And Roll Heart Attack was re-released on CD in 2007 on Magada Records.

== Musicians ==
- Cindy Valentine – lead vocals
- Chris Wade – keyboards
- Rod Mcmanus – keyboards
- Davide Amadei – guitars
- Aubrey Dana – guitars
- Rick Rice – guitars
- Bryan Hughes – guitars
- Greg Steele – drums, percussion
- Asher Fisher – drums, percussion
- Lorne Ould – bass
- Nick Pregino – bass

== Track list ==
Rock & Roll Heart Attack (1984) CBS Records
No.	Title	Writer(s)	Length
1.	"Victim" (Released as a single with "Using Me" on B-side)	Tony Green	4:03
2.	"Fool in the Night"	B. Stanley, S. Trotter	4:18
3.	"Big Kiss" (Released as a single with "Don't Waste Your Love" on B-side)	D. Ray	3:44
4.	"Love Child" (Diana Ross cover)	Taylor, Wilson, Sawyer, Richards	3:55
5.	"Power of Love"	Tony Green	5:00
6.	"Living in the Fast Lane"	Tony Green	4:31
7.	"Make It Through the Night" (Released as a single with "Love Child" on B-side)	C. Valentine, T. Green	3:31
8.	"Using Me"	Cindy Valentine	4:57
9.	"Lust"	C. Valentine, A. Dana, L. Ould, G. Steele, D. Amadei, C. Wade	4:09
10.	"Don't Waste Your Love"	Tony Green	4:03
