= Secret Rendezvous =

Secret Rendezvous may refer to:

- Secret Rendezvous (band), a Dutch band
- Secret Rendezvous (novel), a 1977 book by Kōbō Abe
- "Secret Rendezvous" (song), a 1989 single by Karyn White
- Secret Rendez-Vous, a 1987 album by Cindy Valentine
