= Like a Hurricane =

Like a Hurricane may refer to:

- "Like a Hurricane" (Neil Young song), 1975
- Like a Hurricane (album), a 1987 album by C. C. Catch
