= Big Fun =

Big Fun may refer to:

- "Big Fun" (Kool & the Gang song), 1982
- "Big Fun", a song by the New Power Generation from their 1995 album Exodus
- Big Fun, the U.S. version of the Inner City album Paradise
  - "Big Fun" (Inner City song), the title song
- Big Fun (Miles Davis album), 1974
- Big Fun (Shalamar album), 1979
- Big Fun (Elvin Bishop album), 1988
- Big Fun (C.C. Catch album), 1988
- Big Fun (band), a 1988–1994 UK group
- Big Fun, a fictional band in the 1988 film Heathers
  - "Big Fun", a song from the 2010 musical Heathers
- "Big Fun", a song by S Club 8, B-side of 2003 single "Don't Tell Me You're Sorry"
- Big Fun (Towa Tei album), 2009
