= Mary Roos =

German singer

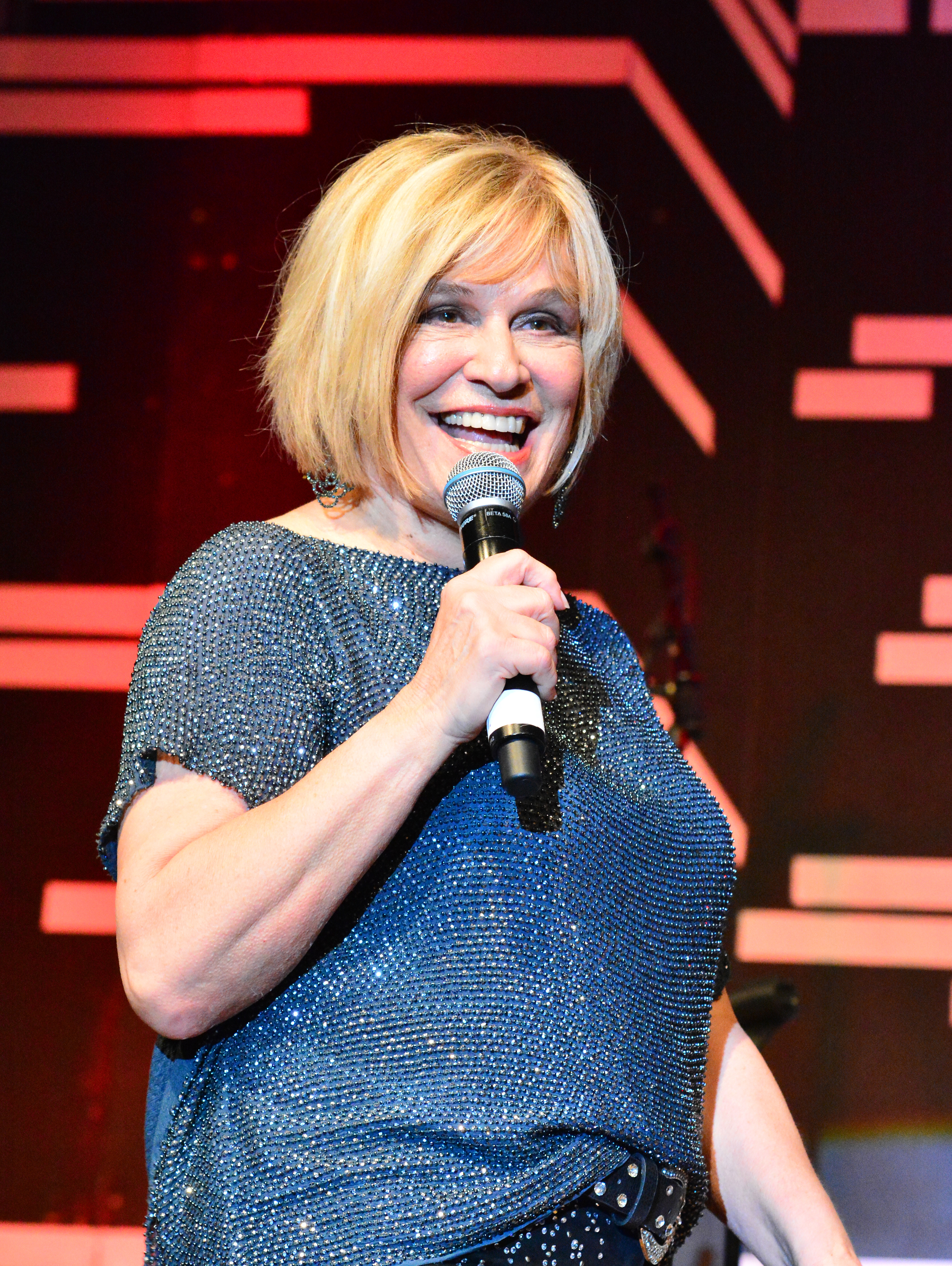
- Mary Roos in 2015

Background information
- Also known as: Mary Roos; Rosemarie; Die kleine Rosemarie
- Born: Rosemarie Schwab; 9 January 1949 (age 77); Bingen, Germany
- Origin: Hamburg, Germany
- Genres: Euro disco, Schlager
- Instrument: Singing
- Years active: 1958–present
- Labels: CBS, da music, Ariola
- Website: mary-roos.de

Mary Roos (born Rosemarie Schwab on 9 January 1949) is a German singer and actress.

== Biography ==
=== 1949–1970 ===
Schwab was born in Bingen. At the age of nine, she recorded her first song "Ja die Dicken sind ja so gemütlich" as Die kleine Rosemarie. It was no major commercial success. In 1958, she also appeared in the film Die Straße. Over the following years she would release many records and she also appeared in many singing competitions. Her first chart success came in 1965, when the single "Geh nicht den Weg" peaked at #36. In 1969, she took part in the Grand Prix RTL International with the song "Die Legende der Liebe". The same year, she reached the single charts again – "Das hat die Welt noch nicht erlebt" peaked at #19. Her first major hit was achieved in 1970 with the song "Arizona Man". It peaked at #9 in the single charts and remains her only top ten hit to date. The same year, she took part in the German national final for the Eurovision Song Contest for the first time. She was chosen to take part in the last minute – Edina Pop had to withdraw from the competition as she fell ill and Mary Roos was chosen to sing "Bei jedem Kuss" instead. She finished joint second among the six participants; nevertheless, the song was never recorded.

=== 1971–1983 ===
In the early 1970s, Roos got her own TV show on German television. At the same time, she tried to start a career in France, where she played the lead role in the musical Un enfant dans la ville next to Michel Fugain but only had a couple of popular hits with "L'Autoroute", "Amour toujours", "Je c'est I, Tu c'est you", "L'amour en blue jean" and "Les petits soldats". In 1972, she entered the German national final for the Eurovision Song Contest the second time. With her song "Nur die Liebe läßt uns leben" she finished second after the first round of voting only one point behind Cindy & Bert but got the overall victory after the second round of voting. After the reprise of the winning song, she was booed off stage and her victory caused a stir in Germany as she was not the winner of the first round of voting and because of her mediocre vocal performance. In a later interview, she stated that she did not expect to win at all and that she was already removing her make-up when she was called back on stage. However, at the Eurovision Song Contest 1972 in Edinburgh, she finished third. The song was a hit in Germany peaking at #17 in the single charts. Throughout the 1970s she kept releasing singles and albums and was a frequent guest in music shows, although she did not have any more major hits. In 1975, she took part in the German national final again and finished third with "Eine Liebe ist wie ein Lied". Her fourth participation in the national final took place in 1982, where she competed among others against her then husband Werner Böhm. She performed the duet "Lady" with David Hanselmann and finished sixth out of the twelve participants, however, the song was commercially the second most successful one of the year.

In 1982, she covered F. R. David's song "Words".

=== 1984–today ===
In 1984, Roos took part in the German national final for the Eurovision Song Contest for the fifth and last time so far and she sang herself to victory again: "Aufrecht geh'n" narrowly won the ticket to the Eurovision Song Contest 1984. At the contest, the song only received 34 points and finished 13th among the 19 contestants. Mary Roos was blamed for a bad vocal performance which she says was caused by an emotional crisis after her separation from her husband Werner Böhm. "Aufrecht geh'n" would also be her last appearance in the single charts until 1999, when she released a German cover version of Cher's song "Believe" ("Leider lieb ich dich immer noch"). Today, she still has many live concerts and is said to be one of the most-booked singers of the schlager genre. In 1985 Roos covered some C. C. Catch and Modern Talking's songs in German, including "You're My Heart, You're My Soul" (as "Ich bin stark, nur mit Dir"], and "I Can Lose My Heart Tonight".

== Personal life ==
From 1981 to 1989, Roos was married to party singer Werner Böhm (known as Gottlieb Wendehals). She is the sister of Tina York, another popular schlager singer in Germany.

== Discography ==
=== Charted singles ===
Year	Single	Charts DEU
1965	Geh nicht den Weg	36
1969	Das hat die Welt noch nicht erlebt	19
1970	Das beste an Dir	33
1970	Arizona Man	9
1971	Am Anfang war die Liebe	36
1972	Nur die Liebe läßt uns leben	17
1972	Er bleibt hier (für immer)	39
1973	Fremdes Mädchen	45
1973	Geh nicht den Weg	36
1973	Lieber John	40
1975	Eine Liebe ist wie ein Lied	50
1975	Stop, mach das nochmal	40
1979	Ich werde geh'n heute Nacht	25
1982	Lady	31
1984	Aufrecht geh'n	56
1999	Leider lieb ich Dich noch immer	87

=== Albums ===
- Lieber John (1973)
- Mary Roos (1976)
- Ich bin Mary (1977)
- Maryland (1978)
- Was ich fühle (1981)
- Leben spür'n (1982)
- Alles was ich will (1987)
- Mehr als ein Gefühl (1992)
- Rücksicht (1995)
- Heiß und kalt (1997)
- Mittendrin (1997)
- Schlager-Party mit Mary Roos (1999)
- Meine Besten (2000)
- Roosige Zeiten (2000)
- Leben für Musik (2001)
- Achterbahn (2003)
- Augenblicke (2003)
- Herzen zu verschenken (2003)
- Mein Porträt (2003)
- Leben (2005)
- Meine größten Hits (2006)
- Immer wieder (2006)
- Was ich fühle (2007)
- Hautnah (2007)
- Gezeiten (2009)
- Bis hierhin ... und weiter (2011)
- Denk was du willst (2013)
- Bilder meines Lebens (2015)
- Ab jetzt nur noch Zugaben! (2017)
- Abenteuer Unvernunft (2018)

== Sources ==
- Biography on mary-roos.de
- Jan Feddersen: "Ein Lied kann eine Brücke sein", 2002

Preceded by Katja Ebstein with Diese Welt	Germany in the Eurovision Song Contest; 1972	Succeeded by Gitte with Junger Tag
Preceded by Hoffmann & Hoffmann with Rücksicht	Germany in the Eurovision Song Contest; 1984	Succeeded by Wind with Für alle
