= Catch the Catch =

Studio album by C. C. Catch
- Released: April 28, 1986
- Recorded: 1985–1986
- Genres: Eurodisco; Europop; synth-pop
- Length: 40:36
- Label: Hansa Records
- Producers: Dieter Bohlen; Luis Rodríguez

C. C. Catch chronology
Catch the Catch (1986)	Welcome to the Heartbreak Hotel (1986)

Singles from Catch the Catch
- 1. "I Can Lose My Heart Tonight" Released: July 31, 1985; 2. "'Cause You Are Young" Released: January 20, 1986; 3. "Strangers by Night" Released: April 14, 1986

Catch the Catch is the debut studio album by Dutch-German singer C. C. Catch, released on April 28, 1986 by Hansa Records. Produced by Dieter Bohlen and Luis Rodríguez, the album is a collection of Eurodisco and synth-pop songs. It features the hit singles "I Can Lose My Heart Tonight", "'Cause You Are Young" and "Strangers by Night", all of which reached the top 10 in several European territories.

== Track listing ==
All tracks are written by Dieter Bohlen.

No.	Title	Length
1.	"'Cause You Are Young" (Maxi-version)	4:53
2.	"I Can Lose My Heart Tonight" (Maxi-version)	5:54
3.	"You Shot a Hole in My Soul" (Maxi-version)	5:16
4.	"One Night's Not Enough"	3:23
5.	"Strangers by Night" (Maxi-version)	5:43
6.	"Stay" (Maxi-version)	5:47
7.	"Jump in My Car" (Maxi-version)	4:33
8.	"You Can Be My Lucky Star Tonight" (Maxi-version)	5:20
Total length:		40:46

== Personnel ==
Adapted from the album's liner notes.

- Dieter Bohlen – production, arrangement, music, lyrics
- M. Vormstein – art direction, concept, front cover artwork
- Herbert W. Hesselmann – back cover artwork
- Ariola-Studios – design

== Charts ==
=== Weekly charts ===
Weekly chart performance for Catch the Catch
Chart (1986)	Peak position
Austrian Albums (Ö3 Austria)	24
Finnish Albums (Suomen virallinen lista)	17
German Albums (Offizielle Top 100)	6
Norwegian Albums (VG-lista)	6
Spanish Albums (AFYVE)	21
Swedish Albums (Sverigetopplistan)	25
Swiss Albums (Schweizer Hitparade)	8

=== Year-end charts ===
Yearly chart performance for Catch the Catch
Chart (1986)	Position
German Albums (Offizielle Top 100)	57
