= Tracy Scoggins =

American actress (born c. 1953)

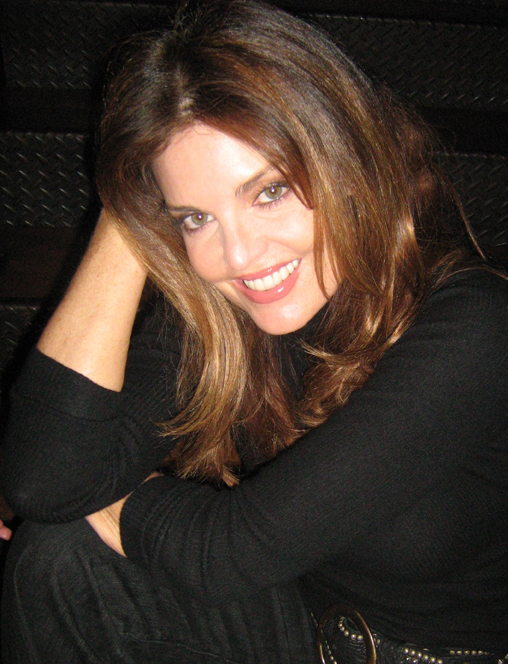
- Scoggins in 2008
- Born: Tracy Dawn Scoggins; November 13, 1953 (age 72); Galveston County, Texas, U.S.
- Education: Dickinson High School
- Alma mater: Southwest Texas State University
- Occupations: Actress; model
- Years active: 1979–present

Tracy Dawn Scoggins (born November 13, 1953) is an American actress and model. She began her career in Elite Model Management in New York City and the European modeling circuit. She returned to the United States and studied acting at the Herbert Berghof Studio in the late 1970s. In the early 1980s, Scoggins began appearing on television and film, notably playing main roles in the short-lived television series The Renegades (1983) and Hawaiian Heat (1984).

Scoggins starred as Monica Colby in the 1980s primetime soap opera Dynasty (1985, 1989) and its spin-off series The Colbys (1985–1987). She starred as Cat Grant in the first season of the ABC comedy-drama series, Lois & Clark: The New Adventures of Superman (1993–94), and as Captain Elizabeth Lochley during the final season of Babylon 5 in 1998 and its sequels.

== Early life ==
Scoggins was born in Galveston County, Texas. An only child, Scoggins is the daughter of John Scott Scoggins and Lou Cille (née Crump) Scoggins. Her father was a trial lawyer, and her mother graduated from law school and was a tennis champion. She attributes her own success to their influence.

At the age of nine, Scoggins won a diving championship; by 13, she was accumulating swimming medals. At Dickinson High School, where she graduated in 1970, Scoggins was an athlete, excelling in cheerleading, gymnastics, and diving. She enrolled at Southwest Texas State University in 1970. As a student-athlete there, she was on the varsity gymnastics team and graduated with a bachelor's degree in physical education. While at Southwest Texas State, Scoggins nearly qualified for a spot on the 1980 Olympic diving team.

== Career ==
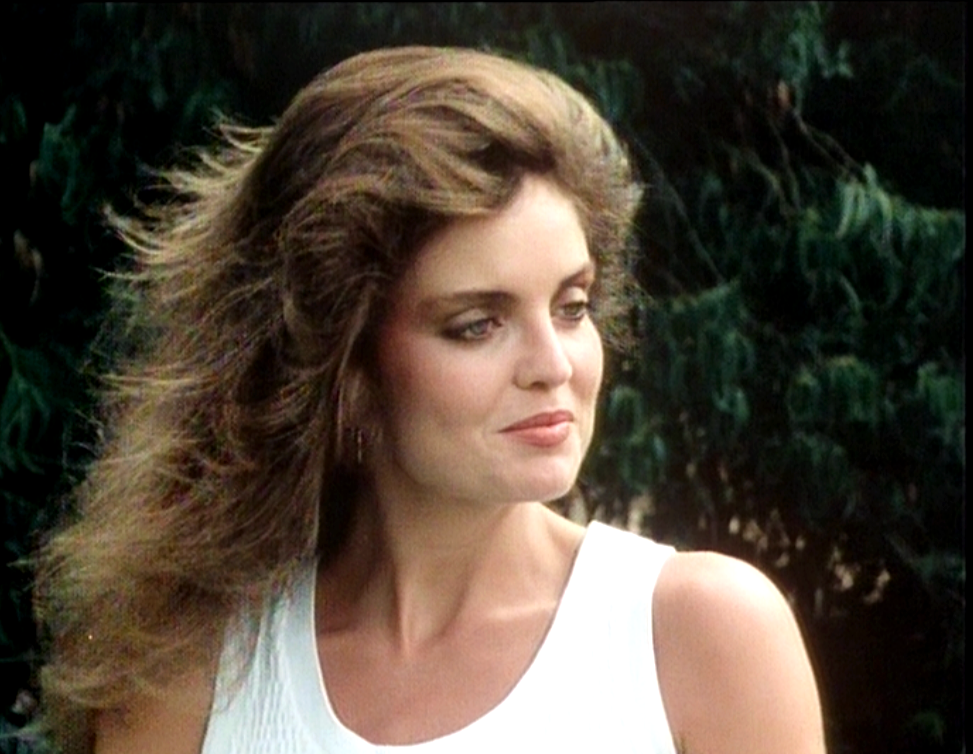
Scoggins in The Optimist (1983)

After graduation, Scoggins briefly taught physical education before being recruited by John Casablancas of the Elite Model Management agency. Elite sent Scoggins to New York, where she worked for a year before embarking on a European fashion modeling circuit that included Italy, Germany, and France. Scoggins returned to the United States and studied with the Herbert Berghof Studio and the Wynn Hanmann Studio in hopes of launching an acting career. Scoggins' first role was as a fake deputy sheriff in the fourth season Dukes of Hazzard episode "New Deputy in Town" in 1981; she then appeared in the TV movie Twirl. She was cast as a regular in the short-lived 1983 ABC series The Renegades. The following year, she was cast as a regular on the 1984 ABC television series Hawaiian Heat, which lasted 11 episodes.

After guest roles in TV series such as Remington Steele, T. J. Hooker, Blue Thunder and The A-Team, Scoggins had a series regular role on the Dynasty spin-off series The Colbys, playing Monica Colby, the daughter of Charlton Heston's character, with Scoggins appearing as Monica from 1985–1987 in two episodes of Dynasty followed by all 49 episodes of The Colbys. Nearly two years after the cancellation of The Colbys after two seasons in 1987, Scoggins reprised the role of Monica Colby in the last eight episodes of the final season of Dynasty in 1989.

Scoggins made her professional big screen debut in the 1984 action film Toy Soldiers, but played first leading role in the 1988 crime thriller film In Dangerous Company. She played another leading role in the 1990 action comedy The Gumshoe Kid alongside Jay Underwood and also that year starred in Michael Schultz-directed made-for-television comedy-satire Jury Duty: The Comedy. She starred in the horror films Watchers II (1990) and Demonic Toys (1992), as well detective film Dan Turner, Hollywood Detective (1990) and legal thriller Ultimate Desires (also known as Silhouette, 1991), both opposite Marc Singer. She co-starred opposite Michael Biehn in the science-fiction film Timebomb (1991), and Alien Intruder (1993). In 1994, she produced her own workout video, Tough Stuff. She was in the 1995 3DO game Snow Job.

In 1993, Scoggins returned to series television with the role of Cat Grant in the ABC comedy-drama Lois & Clark: The New Adventures of Superman. She left the series after the first season. In 1994, Alan Spencer cast Scoggins in a pilot for CBS called Galaxy Beat. The pilot did not sell. Spencer said that she is "one of the funniest people on Earth". She made guest appearances in Doogie Howser, M.D., Burke's Law, Star Trek: Deep Space Nine, Cybill, Wings and Silk Stalkings. From 1995 to 1996, Scoggins starred as Amanda Carpenter in the Western series, Lonesome Dove: The Outlaw Years, and in 1997 had a recurring role in three episodes of Highlander: The Series. Scoggins starred as Anita Smithfield in two Dallas TV movies (Dallas: J.R. Returns (1996) and Dallas: War of the Ewings (1998)). This was not her first role in Dallas, as she had played a small part as another character, Diane Kelly, in a 1983 episode.

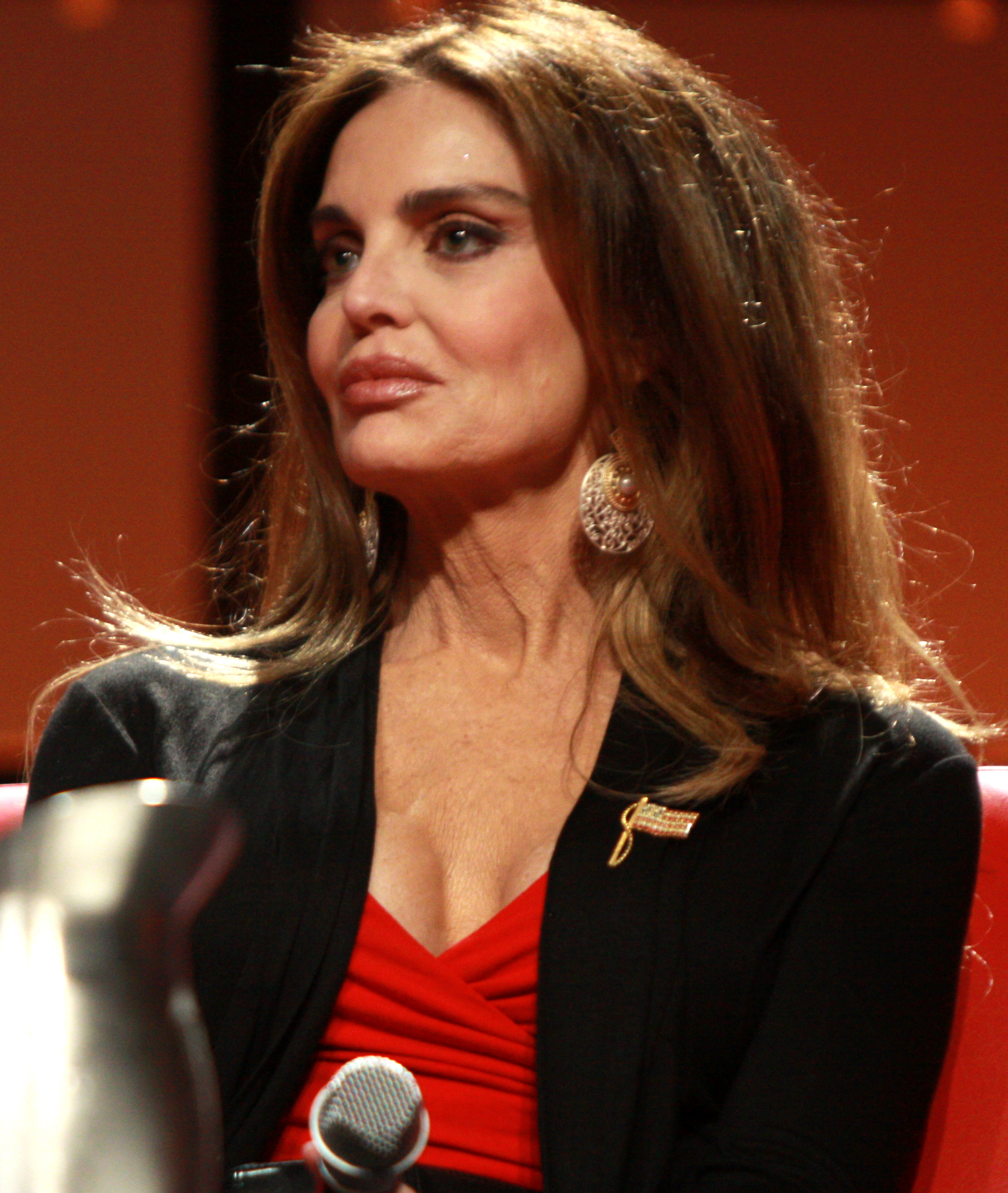
Scoggins at the 2013 Phoenix Comicon in Phoenix, Arizona

In 1998, Scoggins was cast as Elizabeth Lochley in the final season of space opera Babylon 5. She later starred in the spin-off Crusade (1999) as well as in the made-for-television movies Babylon 5: The River of Souls (1998), Babylon 5: A Call to Arms (1999) and Babylon 5: The Lost Tales (2007). In 2023, Scoggins returned to the role in the animated film Babylon 5: The Road Home.

In 2001, Scoggins made her return to cinema appearing in the horror film A Crack in the Floor. She later starred in the horror films Asylum of the Damned (2003), The Strange Case of Dr. Jekyll and Mr. Hyde (2006) and Otis (2008). She played Aaron Carter's character mother in the 2005 teen comedy film Popstar and later that year starred opposite Chuck Norris in the action film The Cutter.

In 2005, Scoggins landed a role as a main character, Grace Neville, on the gay supernatural series Dante's Cove. In 2006, she had a guest role in the fourth-season premiere of the TV show Nip/Tuck and in 2008 guest-starred on NCIS.

== Filmography ==
=== Film ===
| Year | Title | Role | Notes |
|---|---|---|---|
| 1982 | Some Kind of Hero | Flirty Elevator Girl | |
| 1984 | Toy Soldiers | Monique | |
| 1988 | In Dangerous Company | Evelyn | |
| 1990 | The Gumshoe Kid | Rita Benson | |
| 1990 | Dan Turner, Hollywood Detective | Vala Duvalle | |
| 1990 | Watchers II | Barbara White | |
| 1990 | Play Murder for Me | Tricia Merritt | |
| 1990 | Face the Edge | Cindy | |
| 1991 | Timebomb | Blue | |
| 1991 | Ultimate Desires | Samantha Stewart | |
| 1992 | Demonic Toys | Judith Gray | |
| 1993 | Alien Intruder | Ariel | |
| 1993 | Dollman vs. Demonic Toys | Judith Gray | |
| 1994 | Dead On | Marla Beaumont | |
| 2001 | A Crack in the Floor | Jeremiah's Mother | |
| 2003 | Asylum of the Damned | Helen | |
| 2004 | Popstar | Judy McQueen | |
| 2005 | The Cutter | Alena | |
| 2006 | Mr. Hell | Dominique Horney | |
| 2006 | The Strange Case of Dr. Jekyll and Mr. Hyde | Detective Karen Utterson | |
| 2007 | Babylon 5: The Lost Tales | Colonel Elizabeth Lochley | |
| 2008 | Otis | Rita Vitale | |
| 2013 | Cat Power | Julie Richman | Short film |
| 2014 | Borrowed Moments | Betsy | |
| 2021 | City Limits | Candice Hunter | |
| 2023 | Babylon 5: The Road Home | Capt. Elizabeth Lochley | Voice |
| 2024 | Alien Vacation | | Post-production |

=== Television ===
- Twirl (1981) as Cindy Ryan
- The Dukes of Hazzard as Linda Mae Barnes (1 episode, 1981)
- The Devlin Connection as Sylvia March (1 episode, 1982)
- The Fall Guy as June (1 episode, 1982)
- Remington Steele as Chrissie Carstairs (1 episode, 1983)
- The Optimist as The Lady Golfer (1 episode, 1983)
- Dallas as Diane Kelly (1 episode, 1983)
- Manimal as Kathy Bonann (1 episode, 1983)
- Hardcastle and McCormick as Crystal Dawn (1 episode, 1983)
- The A-Team as Elly Payne, Shana Mayer (1 episode each, 1983)
- The Renegades as Tracy (TV movie, 1983)
- Hawaiian Heat as Irene Gorley (TV movie, 1984)
- T. J. Hooker as Jill Newmark (1 episode, 1984)
- Mike Hammer as Claire (1 episode, 1984)
- Blue Thunder as Gretchen Terrell (1 episode, 1984)
- Hawaiian Heat as Irene Gorley (Main cast, 1984)
- Crazy Like a Fox (TV series) as Joy (1 episode, 1985)
- The Colbys as Monica Colby (Main cast, 1985–87)
- Dynasty as Monica Colby (Recurring role, 1985, 1989)
- Hotel as Dana March (1 episode, 1987)
- Jury Duty: The Comedy (1990) as Hope Hathaway
- Raven as Alexis Page (1 episode, 1992)
- Renegade as Jeanette (1 episode, 1992)
- The Heights as Belinda (1 episode, 1992)
- Doogie Howser, M.D. as Kelly Phillips (1 episode, 1993)
- Danger Theatre as Clarise Payne (1 episode, 1993)
- Lois & Clark: The New Adventures of Superman as Catherine 'Cat' Grant (Main cast, season 1, 1993–94)
- Burke's Law as Roxanne North (1 episode, 1994)
- Garfield and Friends as Heather St. Claire (1 episode, 1994)
- The Commish as Christine Rivers (1 episode, 1995)
- Star Trek: Deep Space Nine as Gilora (1 episode, 1995)
- Lonesome Dove: The Outlaw Years as Amanda Carpenter (Main cast, season 2, 1995–96)
- Cybill as Invincigirl (1 episode, 1996)
- Unhappily Ever After as Morgana (1 episode, 1996)
- Wings as Elise (1 episode, 1996)
- Dallas: J.R. Returns as Anita Smithfield (TV movie, 1996)
- Highlander as Cassandra (3 episodes, 1996–97)
- High Tide as Christy Keaton (1 episode, 1997)
- Silk Stalkings as Jessica Scott (2 episodes, 1993, 1997)
- Mike Hammer, Private Eye as Beth Reynolds (1 episode, 1997)
- Babylon 5: The River of Souls as Capt. Elizabeth Lochley (TV movie, 1998)
- Babylon 5 as Capt. Elizabeth Lochley (Main cast, season 5, 1998)
- Dallas: War of the Ewings as Anita Smithfield (TV movie, 1999)
- Babylon 5: A Call to Arms as Capt. Elizabeth Lochley (TV movie, 1999)
- Crusade as Capt. Elizabeth Lochley (Main cast, 1999)
- Felicity as Kelly (1 episode, 2001)
- Homeland Security (2004) as Catherine Adel
- Saurian (2006) as Simtra
- Dante's Cove as Grace Neville (Main cast, 2005–07)
- Nip/Tuck as Jill White (1 episode, 2006)
- NCIS as Tabitha Summers (1 episode, 2008)
- Castle as Lana (1 episode, 2012)
