= Big Time (C. C. Catch song) =

Single by C. C. Catch

from the album Hear What I Say
- B-side: "Feels Like Heaven"
- Released: September 25, 1989
- Recorded: 1989
- Genre: Dance-pop; funk; synth-pop
- Length: 3:45
- Label: Metronome Musik GmbH
- Songwriters: C. C. Catch; Georg Koppehele; Martin Koppehele
- Producers: Andy Taylor; David Clayton

C. C. Catch singles chronology
"Good Guys Only Win in Movies" (1989)	"Big Time" (1989)	"Midnight Hour" (1989)

"Big Time" is the first single by pop singer C. C. Catch from her fifth studio album "Hear What I Say" and was released in 1989 by Metronome. The single entered Top-30 on the German charts, peaking at No. 26.

== Track listing and formats ==
7-inch single – Metronome 889 892-7
3-inch CD single – Metronome 889 892-3

1. "Big Time" (Radio version) – 3:45
2. "Feels Like Heaven" – 5:12

12-inch single – Metronome 889 893-1
5-inch CD single – Metronome 889 893-2

1. "Big Time" (Remix) – 6:45
2. "Feels Like Heaven" – 5:12
3. "Big Time" (Radio version) – 3:45

== Charts ==
Chart (1989)	Peak position
Finland (IFPI Finland)	22
Germany (GfK Entertainment charts)	26
