= 'Cause You Are Young =

1986 song by C.C. Catch

Single by C. C. Catch

from the album Catch the Catch
- B-side: "One Night's Not Enough"
- Released: January 20, 1986
- Recorded: 1985
- Genre: Eurodisco; synth-pop
- Length: 3:30 (7" version); 4:55 (12" Maxi-Version)
- Label: Hansa; Ariola
- Songwriter: Dieter Bohlen
- Producer: Dieter Bohlen

C. C. Catch singles chronology
| "I Can Lose My Heart Tonight" (1985) | "'Cause You Are Young" (1986) | "Strangers by Night" (1986) |

"'Cause You Are Young" is the second single by C. C. Catch, released on January 20, 1986, by Hansa. The song was produced by German producer Dieter Bohlen of the duo Modern Talking. It was the second single from C. C. Catch's debut album Catch the Catch, released in 1986.

In Germany, "'Cause You Are Young" reached #9, becoming C. C. Catch's first song to reach the Top 10 in the country. The song became one of her most commercially successful tracks, finding additional success in Austria, where it reached #28, as well as peaking at #8 in both Spain and Switzerland.

== Track listing ==
7" Single

| No. | Title | Length |
|---|---|---|
| 1. | "'Cause You Are Young" | 3:30 |
| 2. | "One Night's Not Enough" | 3:22 |

12" Single (Hansa 602 144, 1986)

| No. | Title | Length |
|---|---|---|
| 1. | "'Cause You Are Young (Maxi-Version)" | 4:55 |
| 2. | "One Night's Not Enough (Maxi-Version)" | 5:17 |

== Credits ==
- Lyrics and music — Dieter Bohlen
- Arrangements — Dieter Bohlen
- Production — Dieter Bohlen
- Design — Vormstein/Kortemeier
- Art direction — Manfred Vormstein
- Photography — Günter W. Kienitz
- Distribution — Ariola Group

== Charts ==
| Chart (1986) | Peak position |
|---|---|
| Austria (Ö3 Austria Top 40) | 28 |
| Spain (PROMUSICAE) | 8 |
| Switzerland (Schweizer Hitparade) | 8 |
| West Germany (Gfk) | 9 |
