= Train of Life =

- Film poster
- French: Train de vie
- Directed by: Radu Mihăileanu
- Written by: Radu Mihăileanu
- Starring: Lionel Abelanski; Rufus; Agathe de la Fontaine
- Cinematography: Giorgos Arvanitis
- Edited by: Monique Rysselinck
- Music by: Goran Bregović
- Distributed by: AB International Distribution (France); Cinélibre (Belgium); AD Matalon & Co. LTD (Israel); Independenta Film (Romania)
- Release dates: 5 September 1998 (Venice); 16 September 1998 (France)
- Running time: 103 minutes
- Countries: France; Belgium; Netherlands; Israel; Romania
- Languages: French; German
- Budget: €5.2 million
- Box office: $3.3 million

Train of Life (French: Train de vie) is a 1998 tragicomedy film by France, Belgium, Netherlands, Israel and Romania made in the French language. It tells the story of an eastern European Jewish village's plan to escape the Holocaust.

== Plot ==
The film starts off with a man, named Schlomo (Lionel Abelanski), running crazily through a forest, with his voice playing in the background, saying that he has seen the horror of the Nazis in a nearby town, and he must tell the others. Once he gets into town, he informs the rabbi, and together they run through the town and once they have got enough people together, they hold a town meeting. At first, many of the men do not believe the horrors they are being told, and many criticize Schlomo, for he is the town lunatic, and who could possibly believe him? But the rabbi believes him, and then they try to tackle the problem of the coming terrors. Amidst the pondering and the arguing, Schlomo suggests that they build a train, so they can escape by deporting themselves. Some of their members pretend to be Nazis in order to ostensibly transport them to a concentration camp, when in reality, they are going to Palestine via Russia. Thus the Train of Life is born.

On their escape route through rural Eastern Europe, the train sees tensions between its inhabitants, close encounters with real Nazis as well as Communist partisans, and fraternization with the Roma, until the community arrives just at the frontlines between German and Soviet fire.

Its ends with the voice-over of Schlomo himself, who tells the stories of his companions after the arrival of the train in the Soviet Union: Some went on to Palestine, some stayed in the Soviet Union, and some even made it to America. As he is telling this, a cut to a close-up of his face happens as he says, "That is the true story of my shtetl...", but then the camera makes a quick zoom-out, revealing him grinning and wearing prisoner's clothes behind the barbed wire of a concentration camp, and he ends with, "Ye nu, almost the true story!"

== Cast ==
- Lionel Abelanski as Schlomo
- Rufus as Mordechai
- Clément Harari as the Rabbi
- Michel Muller as Yossi
- Agathe de la Fontaine as Esther
- Johan Leysen as Schmecht
- Bruno Abraham-Kremer as Yankele
- Marie-José Nat as Sura
- Gad Elmaleh as Manzatou

== Background ==
In 1996, Roberto Benigni, writer-director of Train of Life's perceived competitor Life Is Beautiful, had been sent the script to Train of Life and offered the role of village idiot Shlomo by writer-director Mihăileanu, but Benigni turned it down and afterwards went to write and direct Life Is Beautiful. Mihăileanu refuses to publicly discuss whether Benigni has plagiarized his film, instead preferring to say that he and Benigni have made "two very different films".

Writer-director Mihăileanu said that reporters came to ask him about Shlomo's ultimate fate which the film leaves open, whether he will perish during the war or if he will survive. Mihăileanu said, "At first, I didn't know how to answer this one. But then I found the right answer: It's up to you in the audience! If you'll forget Shlomo, he'll die. But if you'll remember him, he'll live forever."

== Critical reception ==
On Rotten Tomatoes the film has a 64% rating based on reviews from 22 critics. Metacritic gives it a score of 62 out of 100 based on 15 reviews, indicating "Generally favorable reviews".

Many reviewers at the time drew comparisons between Train of Life and its contemporary competitor films Life Is Beautiful and Jakob the Liar, because all three were released to North American theaters in 1999, but Train of Life had been the first in production. While Jakob the Liar was near-universally panned, critics were divided upon which out of the other two worked better as a "Holocaust comedy".

While Desson Howe of the Washington Post called Train of Life a "less-than-scintillating spin on Life Is Beautiful", James Berardinelli of ReelViews found the film's comedy "too 'French' in nature — which is to say that it tends towards silliness and slapstick." Rob Blackwelder of SlicedWire (while not opposed to the idea of Holocaust tragicomedies in general) found each of the three films suffering from their distinct own flaws. Jim Sullivan of the Boston Globe (without mentioning Jakob the Liar) found that it "works much better" than Life Is Beautiful. Jean Oppenheimer of the Dallas Observer praised Train of Life as being "far superior to either" of the other two, and Henry Cabot Beck of Film.com went as far as comparing it to Spielberg's Academy Award-winning 1993 Holocaust drama, calling Train of Life "every bit as reverent as Schindler's List and no less successful" and contending about its two 1999 competitors that "neither film was as well directed or acted" as Train of Life. Stefan Steinberg of the World Socialist Web Site claimed that Train of Life is "a far better film" than Life Is Beautiful, being impressed by "the immense affection and care with which Mihaileanu has recreated the life and self deprecating humour of the Jewish villagers."

Several American reviewers saw a distinct similarity between Mihăileanu's filmic yarn and the mood and humor found in the writings of Isaac Bashevis Singer or Sholem Aleichem. Many reviewers made favorable comparisons to both Ernst Lubitsch's 1942 version or Mel Brooks's 1983 version of To Be Or Not To Be (citing the same clever wit), positive and negative comparisons to Brooks's 1968 The Producers (calling it either better, worse, or "just as bad" as Brooks's farce), or negatively compared the oftentimes more buffoonish than scary Nazis in the film to the TV series Hogan's Heroes.

=== Review quotes ===
Far superior to either Life Is Beautiful or Jakob the Liar, the French-language production has a silliness and a buffoonish humor reminiscent of Amarcord and Fellini's Roma, yet somehow it feels neither excessive nor offensive. It's no surprise to learn that the picture won the Donatello—the Italian Oscar—for Best Foreign Language film. [...] The underlying sense of vanity that marred Life Is Beautiful is thankfully absent here, as is the saccharine hokiness of Jakob the Liar. Instead, Mihaileanu presents a world in which optimism and fantasy coexist with grim reality. It isn't an easy balance to achieve.

— Jean Oppenheimer: Ha-Ha-Holocaust (Dallas Observer)

This is an offbeat and earnest piece of work, which focuses itself on telling its ripping yarn in a comic and poignant manner rather than drenching it in sentimentality. Mihaileanu tells the fable with a fantastical, vaguely surreal feel, that makes clever use of some standard Jewish tunes and draws neat performances from Abelanski's tragi-comic Shlomo, and De La Fontaine as the village crumpet who creates the movie's most endearing running gag by endlessly falling for the wrong man. Yet for all its plus points, the film isn't quite strong enough to distinguish itself from the recent rash of similarly-themed fare, and as such its appeal is unlikely to reach far beyond the arthouse. It's a likeable oddity, certainly, but in treading such well-heeled turf it also becomes an unremarkable one.

— Empire Online: Train Of Life

Mihaileanu goes to great pains to emphasize the tragedy of the circumstances, although he does so in a somewhat belated and unconventional manner. [...] An important question for viewers of Train of Life is whether a tremendous ending can redeem an otherwise mediocre motion picture. [...] For that reason, Train of Life is one of the few films that works better on subsequent viewings than on the initial one. [...] Ultimately, however, the ending is what will determine how each individual reacts to Train of Life. Someone who walks out midway through the film will have a different perspective than those who stay to the start of the closing credits, since much of what is provocative and interesting about the movie is introduced during the brief epilogue. While this is not the ideal way to structure a motion picture [...], there's no doubt that Train of Life's resolution leaves a forceful impression.

— James Berardinelli: Train of Life (Train de Vie) (ReelViews)

The Train of Life definitely isn't a bullet train or even an Amtrak on a bad day, for that matter. Yet, it's not a complete derailment either, which is surprising, given its unlikely premise and schizophrenic nature. The film contains just enough poignant moments, not the least of which is the final haunting shot, to convey at least a slight air of gravitas, thus saving a film that at times almost comes off as an unwitting sequel to Springtime for Hitler from Mel Brooks' The Producers. Fortunately, it's not that tasteless...but it's not that funny, either. Instead, Train of Life is a thought-provoking and subversively entertaining chronicle that sheds a quirky light on a death-black era in history.

— Merle Bertrand: TRAIN DE VIE (TRAIN OF LIFE) (Film Threat)

If Mihaileanu's movie portrays the Jews in the tradition of storytellers Sholom Aleichem and Isaac Bashevis Singer as dolts, dunces and misguided prophets, this is his wholly positive intention. [...] Shlomo's tale is mythical, a fable, a fairy story of a part with that large group of folklore designed to help make life bearable for a people subjected to persecution for thousands of years. [...] One of the oddest road movies to hit the screen in ages [...]. Each adventure could well have been the basis of tragedy, but proceeding throughout in a comic tone, Mihaileanu turns each exploit into a farcical event. [...] But if the Yiddish proverb is valid, "A gelechter hertmen veiter vi a gevain," or, "Laughter is heard further than weeping," Train of Life is all the more likely to help keep the memory of the Holocaust alive.

— Harvey S. Karten: Train de vie (1998) (IMDB; originally posted to the rec.arts.movies.reviews newsgroup)<

Each of the three films in this genre has walked the tightrope of taste with amazing dexterity, but Life Is Beautiful was simplistic and wildly over-rated, Jakob the Liar was pretentious and dull, and Train of Life is far too dependent on antiquated stock characters (a village idiot?!?) and elementary, low-brow farce.
The movie's heart is in the right place. It celebrates Jewish tradition and has whimsical fun with its stereotypes and a silly subplot about a communist uprising in the boxcars. But its make-you-laugh, make-you-cry, sappy, spoon-fed sentiment has little substance. It feels like a non-confrontational version of its already meek predecessors.

— Rob Blackwelder: Another derailed Holocaust comedy (SPLICEDwire)

Following in the peculiar tradition of such Holocaust dramedys as Life Is Beautiful and, to a lesser degree, Mel Brooks' version of To Be or Not to Be, this boisterous, comic film begins with a panicked flight through an Eastern European forest and ends on a note of such unexpected gravity that it's difficult to put out of your mind even weeks later. [...] When Train of Life is moving at top speed, Mihaileanu strikes an interesting compromise between portraying the flustered, anxious members of the community as they race to escape an almost certain, deadly fate, and injecting strains of flat-out vaudevillian comedy. It's a tough mix to hold together, and the two styles occasionally clash, but the film has such a bizarre, surrealistic tone to begin with that the topsy-turviness of it all manages to echo the madness of wartime to a tee. Lunacy is the name of the game, and it pays to bear in mind that this is a tale being told by a lunatic. Much of the film is frankly ludicrous, but that does little to dispel its overall power and passion. It's a comedy, it's a horror show, it's a romance, and it's a call to Communist arms—it's such an oddball assemblage that it simply can't click all the time, but when it fires on all cylinders, it's one of the most shocking, affecting Holocaust films yet seen.

— Marc Savlov: Train of Life (Austin Chronicle)

[...] Train of Life, another phantasmagorical tale of life among the Nazis, is upon us. This one works much better. Writer/director Radu Mihaileanu shuffles humor and harsh reality, and comes up with an illuminating film with layers of conflict. Tension lingers constantly, and yet there is joy to be found. [...] Mihaileanu [...] asks you to accept a number of preposterous suppositions - from the main theme to the Fiddler on the Roof kind of joie de vivre to the idea that Shlomo can stand on top of a train car as it whizzes through the countryside - but stick with him. There are some wonderful moments - some tense, some fanciful - along the way and a gut-wrenching payoff that makes sense of it all. (Think The Sixth Sense.) [...] The fake Germans try to perfect their calls of "Sieg Heil!" to comic effect. Down the road a piece [...] the fake Nazis ride in comfort, the Jews do not - suggesting horrible things about power.

— Jim Sullivan: On Train, life's even more beautiful (Boston Globe)

=== Awards ===
Among other American and international awards, Train of Life won both the FIPRESCI Prize for Best First Feature and the Anicaflash Prize at the 55th Venice International Film Festival, the World Cinema Audience Award: Dramatic at the 1999 Sundance Film Festival, and the Best Foreign Language Film Award at the Las Vegas Film Critics Society Awards 1999.
