= Good Guys Only Win in Movies =

Single by C. C. Catch

from the album Like a Hurricane
- Released: 1988
- Recorded: 1987
- Genre: Synth-pop
- Length: 5:42
- Label: Hansa
- Songwriter: Dieter Bohlen
- Producers: Dieter Bohlen; Luis Rodríguez

C. C. Catch singles chronology
"Baby, I Need Your Love" (1989)	"Good Guys Only Win in Movies" (1988)	"Big Time" (1989)

"Good Guys Only Win in Movies" is the last single by pop singer C. C. Catch from her third studio album Like a Hurricane. It was released in 1988 as a single by Hansa.

The song features dialogue lines sampled from various episodes of Star Trek: The Original Series:

- "...Computerized half-breed", "My mother was a teacher", "I was happy": This Side of Paradise
- "Including the captain" : Turnabout Intruder
- "Ahead warp factor one, Mister Sulu" : Shore Leave
- "I read no evidence of malfunction" : The Way to Eden

== Track listing ==
7-inch single (Spain) – Hansa 109 857 / Ariola 1A 109857

1. "Good Guys Only Win in Movies" – 3:48
2. "Smokey Joe's Cafe" – 3:41

12-inch single (Spain) – Hansa 609 857 / Ariola 3A 609857

1. "Good Guys Only Win in Movies" (Long version) – 5:42
2. "Smokey Joe's Cafe" – 3:41
3. "Don't Be a Hero" – 3:32

== Charts ==
Chart (1988)	Peak position
Spain (PROMUISCAE)	6
