= Play Murder for Me =

1990 Argentine-American crime drama film

- Directed by: Héctor Olivera
- Release date: 1990
- Running time: 80 minute
- Countries: Argentina; United States

Play Murder for Me, also known as Negra medianoche ("Midnight Black" in English), is a 1990 Argentine-American crime drama film directed by Héctor Olivera

and starring Jack Wagner, Tracy Scoggins, William Paul Burns, Rodolfo Ranni and Gerardo Romano. It was the last film in a series of 10 features that Roger Corman coproduced in Argentina in the mid-to-late 1980s. The screenplay was written by José Pablo Feinmann, with additional dialogue credited to Daryl Haney.

== Synopsis ==
Tricia Merritt is the seductress wife of the dangerous American gangster Fred Merritt. When the couple travel to Buenos Aires, she runs into an old flame, jazz musician Paul Slater, who left USA years ago and is now working at a nightclub. Tricia and Paul rekindle their romance in hiding, and she proposes a plan to murder her husband and run away together.

== Cast ==
- Jack Wagner ... Paul Slater
- Tracy Scoggins ... Tricia Merritt
- William Paul Burns ... Fred Merritt (como William Burns)
- Ivory Ocean ... Lou Venable
- Rodolfo Ranni ... Stanislav Gregorius
- Gerardo Romano ... Alejandro Molina
- Jorge Rivera López ... Victor Silberman
- Francisco Cocuzza ... A.J. Krieger
- Maurice Jouvet ... Patrick
- Manuel Vicente ... Phil Mendoza
- Marcos Woinsky ... Sound & Fury's Manager
- Selva Mayo ... Gregorius' Mistress
- Norma Ibarra ... Concierge
- Alejandra Sylvain ... Dancer
- Ricardo Ibarlin ... Barman
- Araceli González ... Molina's Girlfriend
- Horacio Guisado ... Surgeon
- Diego Borgonovo ... Nurse
