= I Can Lose My Heart Tonight =

Single by C. C. Catch

from the album Catch the Catch
- Released: July 31, 1985
- Recorded: 1985
- Genre: Synth-pop; Eurodisco
- Length: 3:50
- Label: BMG; Hansa
- Songwriter: Dieter Bohlen
- Producer: Dieter Bohlen

C. C. Catch singles chronology
"I Can Lose My Heart Tonight" (1985)	"'Cause You Are Young" (1986)

"I Can Lose My Heart Tonight" is the first single by pop singer C. C. Catch from her debut studio album Catch the Catch, released on July 31, 1985 by Hansa. The song was written by Dieter Bohlen of the duo Modern Talking. It peaked at No. 13 in Germany.

"I Can Lose My Heart Tonight" was remixed and released in 1999 as a single, which peaked at No. 72 in Germany.

== Mary Roos version ==
In July 1985, the cover version of Mary Roos called "Keine Träne Tut Mir Leid (Für Eine Hand Voll Zärtlichkeit)" was released together with the original, also produced by Dieter Bohlen.

== Track listing and formats ==
=== Original version ===
7-inch single – Hansa 107 507

1. "I Can Lose My Heart Tonight" (Single version) – 3:50
2. "I Can Lose My Heart Tonight" (Instrumental) – 3:53

12-inch single – Hansa 601 829

1. "I Can Lose My Heart Tonight" (Extended Club Remix) – 5:53
2. "I Can Lose My Heart Tonight" (Instrumental) – 3:53

12-inch single (40th Anniversary 2025 Remaster) – Warner Music Central Europe 5021732763716

1. "I Can Lose My Heart Tonight" (Extended Club Remix) – 5:53
2. "I Can Lose My Heart Tonight" (Instrumental) – 3:53
3. "I Can Lose My Heart Tonight" (Single version) – 3:46
4. "I Can Lose My Heart Tonight" (Playback version) – 3:46

=== 1999 Remix ===
CD single – Hansa 74321 63326-2

1. "I Can Lose My Heart Tonight '99" (Rap version) (featuring Krayzee) – 3:11
2. "I Can Lose My Heart Tonight '99" (New Vocal version) – 3:30
3. "Soul Survivor '99" (New Vocal version) – 3:38

== Charts ==
Chart performance for "I Can Lose My Heart Tonight" (original release)
Chart (1985)	Peak position
Austria (Ö3 Austria Top 40)	24
Spain (PROMUISCAE)	7
Switzerland (Schweizer Hitparade)	19
West Germany (Gfk)	13

Chart performance for "I Can Lose My Heart Tonight '99"
Chart (1999)	Peak position
Spain (PROMUISCAE)	12
West Germany (Gfk)	72
