= Asylum of the Damned =

- DVD cover
- Directed by: Philip J Jones
- Written by: Matt McCombs
- Produced by: Scott Bedno
- Starring: Matt Stasi; Bruce Payne
- Cinematography: Mark Melville
- Edited by: John Dorsett
- Music by: Steve Bauman; (Cindy) Valentine Leone
- Release date: 2003
- Running time: 90 minutes
- Country: United States
- Language: English

Asylum of the Damned, Columbia Tristar (2004), also known as Hellborn, CDA Entertainment, is a 2003 horror film written by Matt McCombs, directed by Philip J Jones and starring Matt Stasi and Bruce Payne.

== Plot ==
A newly graduated doctor named James Bishop (Matt Stasi), is recruited by St. Andrews Mental Hospital to join their psychiatry residency program. He is given the opportunity to care for mentally ill patients under the tutelage of Dr McCort (Bruce Payne). James' enthusiasm for his new job soon develops into concern when some of the patients die mysteriously. When James seeks to learn more about the deaths, he notes a change in the behaviour of his colleagues. James comes to realise that a Devil has taken over the minds of the patients and that his colleagues are allowing it to harvest them.

== Cast ==
- Bruce Payne as Dr McCort
- Matt Stasi as James Bishop
- Tracy Scoggins as Helen
- Julia Lee as Lauren
- Tom Lister, Jr. as Smithy (Listed as Tom 'Tiny' Lister)
- Gregory Wagrowski as Hadley
- Bill McKinney as Gas Station Attendant
- Randall England as Harry Smith
- Kyle T. Heffner as Dr. Peter Francis

== Reception ==
A reviewer in Fangoria stated that 'at the three-quarters mark it becomes clear that this is the old Karloff-Lugosi The Black Cat dished up anew with Payne and the nuthouse staff substituting for Boris and his cultists and a Demon added'. The reviewer stated that the filmmakers did a good job of setting the eerie stage' and that the 'movie succeeded nicely in grabbing and holding the interest'. The reviewer also stated that Bruce Payne's Dr McCort seemed 'based on some old Vincent Price performance'. Scott C. stated that he enjoyed 'Payne’s take on Dr McCort, as a charming man who enjoys being evil, but the rest of the cast is on autopilot or thorazine'. Francis Barbier described the film as a 'cinematic waste, without any trace of intelligence or originality' and 'transcendently moronic'. Ian Jane lamented that 'the film very quickly falls prey to some seriously predictable and overly cliché characters and plot points that ultimately result in a film that isn't so much scary as it is just plain boring'.
