= Agathe de La Fontaine =

French actress (born 1972)

- Born: 27 March 1972 (age 54); Paris, France

Agathe de La Fontaine (French: [aɡat də la fɔ̃tɛn]; born 27 March 1972) is a French actress. Her film roles include Train de vie (1998), which shared the 1999 Sundance World Cinema Audience Award with Run Lola Run, and Love in Paris, the sequel to 9½ Weeks. La Fontaine was married to former football player Emmanuel Petit from 2000 to 2002.

== Selected filmography ==
- 2007 – Le Scaphandre et le papillon, Inès
- 2000 – Io amo Andrea, Francesca
- 1998 – Train de vie, Esther
- 1997 – Love in Paris, Claire
- 1995 – La Nouvelle Tribu, Victoria
- 1994 – Louis 19, le roi des ondes
- 1994 – Killer Kid, Isabelle
- 1994 – Jeanne
- 1994 – La Caverne de la Rose d'or (Fantagaro), Princesse Angélique
