= Tina York =

German pop singer

Tina York (born Monika Schwab, 29 April 1954) is a German pop singer. She had her greatest success in 1974 with Wir lassen uns das Singen nicht verbieten.

== Career ==
She initially worked as a paralegal after school. In 1969, at the age of 14, she recorded her first, unsuccessful single under the stage name Monia. In 1970, she was discovered by Rudi Wolpert at her sister Mary Roos's wedding. Her first single, Oh Mama Good Bye, a German version of the Tremeloes hit Me and My Life, was released in the same year under the stage name Tina York. The singer was under contract with the record company CBS from 1970 to 1976 and worked with producers such as Peter Orloff and Jack White.

York was a guest on numerous music programs on television, including a total of 17 times on the ZDF-Hitparade from 1970 to 1981, where she took first place in 1974 with the song Wir lassen uns das Singen nicht verbieten, written by White and Fred Jay. York placed in the top three with Wo die Sonne scheint, Liechtensteiner Polka (both 1974) and Ein Adler kann nicht fliegen (1977). In 1976, York took part in the German preliminary decision for the Eurovision Song Contest with the song Das alte Haus and finished in last place. The song, which was based on the disco style popular at the time, was probably not initially released as a single or on an album because of this result. It was not until 2001 that Das alte Haus was released on the comprehensive compilation Stationen: Von heute bis morgen released in 2001.

Further successes came to York in the German Airplay charts from 1976 with Gib dem Glück eine Chance (1976), Ein Mann wie du (1977) and Ein Lied für Maria (1978) as well as the two top 10 hits Ein Adler kann nicht fliegen (1977) and Ich bin da (1981). York recorded three studio albums in the 1970s, Wir lassen uns das Singen nicht verbieten (1975), Ich bring' dir heut' ein Ständchen (1977) and Mein Weg zu dir (1978).

After a 29-year break and numerous compilations of her successes and singles, a new album entitled Ich träume mit dir was not released until 2007. In 2018, she took part in the twelfth season of the RTL show I bin ein Star - Holt mich hier raus!, in which she came third behind Daniele Negroni and the season winner Jenny Frankhauser.

York is divorced and lives in Berlin.

== Television appearances ==
- 2018: Ich bin ein Star - Holt mich hier raus!, Staffel 12 (RTL)
- 2022: Ich bin ein Star - Die Stunde danach (RTL)

== Discography ==
=== Albums ===
- 1974 Wir lassen uns das Singen nicht verbieten
- 1977 Ich bring dir ein Ständchen
- 1979 Mein Weg zu dir
- 2001 Stationen von heute bis gestern
- 2005 Große Erfolge
- 2007 Ich träume mit dir

=== Singles ===
- 1970 Oh Mama goodbye
- 1971 Papa ist dafür
- 1973 Wo die Sonne scheint
- 1974 Liechtensteiner Polka
- 1974 Wir lassen uns das Singen nicht verbieten
- 1975 Umarmst du mich, umarm' ich dich
- 1976 Das alte Haus
- 1976 Zwei junge Menschen
- 1976 Gib dem Glück eine Chance
- 1977 Ein Mann wie du
- 1977 Ein Adler kann nicht fliegen
- 1978 Wie ein Grashalm im Herbstwind
- 1978 Ein Lied für Maria
- 1979 Dieter
- 1979 Es gibt nicht nur einen Mann im Leben
- 1981 Ich bin da
- 1984 Little River
- 2000 "Viel zu nah am Feuer"
- 2001 Tief in meinem Herz...
- 2002 Irgendwas ist immer
- 2003 Ich steh´ neben mir, steh´ ich neben Dir
- 2004 Wie kann ich von Dir träumen
- 2004 Woher soll ich heute wissen was ich morgen will
- 2004 Du bist Champagner für die Augen
- 2006 Manchmal darf man ja noch träumen
- 2006 Wenn ich schlaf bin ich ein Engel
- 2007 Warum gerade du
- 2007 Schöne Männer küsst man nicht
- 2007 Wieviel Liebe ist zuviel
- 2008 Irgendwie hab ich dich aus den Augen verlor´n
