= Welcome to the Heartbreak Hotel =

Studio album by C. C. Catch
- Released: December 8, 1986
- Recorded: 1986
- Genres: Eurodisco; synth-pop
- Length: 36:19
- Label: Hansa Records
- Producer: Dieter Bohlen

C. C. Catch chronology
Catch the Catch (1986)	Welcome to the Heartbreak Hotel (1986)	Like a Hurricane (1987)

Singles from Welcome to the Heartbreak Hotel
- 1. "Heartbreak Hotel" Released: July 1986; 2. "Heaven and Hell" Released: October 1986

Welcome to the Heartbreak Hotel is the second studio album by Dutch-German singer C. C. Catch, released on December 8, 1986 by Hansa Records. The album was produced by Dieter Bohlen, who also wrote all the tracks. Like its predecessor, Catch the Catch, the album was a commercial success, supported by the singles "Heartbreak Hotel" and "Heaven and Hell". The album's artwork and the music video for "Heaven and Hell" incorporate imagery reminiscent of the 1981 Lucio Fulci horror film The Beyond.

== Track listing ==
All tracks are written by Dieter Bohlen

No.	Title	Length
1.	"Heartbreak Hotel"	3:33
2.	"Picture Blue Eyes"	3:30
3.	"Tears Won't Wash Away My Heartache"	4:19
4.	"V.I.P. (They're Callin' Me Tonight)"	3:27
5.	"You Can't Run Away From it"	3:12
6.	"Heaven and Hell"	3:39
7.	"Hollywood Nights"	3:10
8.	"Born On the Wind"	3:50
9.	"Wild Fire"	3:40
10.	"Stop – Draggin' My Heart Around"	3:07
Total length:		35:27

== Personnel ==
- Dieter Bohlen – production, arrangement, music, lyrics
- Luis Rodríguez – co-production
- M. Vormstein – art direction
- Ariola-Studios – design
- H. W. Hesselmann – artist photography
- Mauritius/NAS Tom McHugh-OKAPA – cover photography

== Charts ==
Chart performance for Welcome to the Heartbreak Hotel
Chart (1986–87)	Peak position
Finnish Albums (Suomen virallinen lista)	40
German Albums (Offizielle Top 100)	28
Spanish Albums (AFYVE)	22
Swedish Albums (Sverigetopplistan)	44
