= Strangers by Night =

- Cover Art, 1986

Single by C. C. Catch

from the album Catch the Catch
- Released: April 14, 1986
- Recorded: 1986
- Genre: Electronic; Eurodisco
- Length: 3:37; 5:41 (Maxi version)
- Label: Hansa; Ariola
- Songwriter: Dieter Bohlen
- Producer: Dieter Bohlen

C. C. Catch singles chronology
"'Cause You Are Young" (1986)	"Strangers by Night" (1986)	"Heartbreak Hotel" (1986)

Music video
- "Strangers By Night" on YouTube

"Strangers by Night" is the third single by German pop singer C. C. Catch from her debut studio album Catch the Catch, released on April 14, 1986, by Hansa. The song was produced and written by German songwriter and producer Dieter Bohlen.

== Track listing ==
7" single (Hansa 108 147)

1. "Strangers by Night" (3:43)
2. "Strangers by Night" (Instrumental Version) (3:43)

12" maxi-version (Hansa 608 147-213)

1. "Strangers by Night" (5:41)
2. "Strangers by Night" (Instrumental Version) (3:43)

== Music video ==
The official music video of "Strangers by Night" was released on YouTube on June 27, 2009. The video was recorded after the release of the single in 1986.

== Charts ==
Weekly chart performance for "Strangers by Night"
Chart (1986)	Peak position
Austria (Ö3 Austria)	15
Belgium (Ultratop)	33
Finland (Suomen virallinen lista)	11
Spain (PROMUSICAE)	11
Switzerland (Schweizer Hitparade)	11
West Germany (Offizielle Top 100)	9
