= Secret Rendez-Vous =

Studio album by Cindy Valentine
- Released: 1987
- Recorded: Mixed: Soundtrack Studios NY, NY; Mastered: Sterling Sound NY, NY
- Genres: Electronic, pop, dance
- Length: 39:28
- Label: Polydor
- Producer: Tony Green

Cindy Valentine chronology
Rock & Roll Heart Attack (1984)	Secret Rendez-Vous (1987)	Blame Yourself (2008)

Singles from Secret Rendez-Vous
- 1. "Secret Rendez-Vous"; 2. "In Your Midnight Hour"

Secret Rendez-Vous is the second album by Cindy Valentine and a single by the same name, both records were distributed on vinyl and cassette tape. Secret Rendez-Vous was Valentine's second album, working with composer and producer Tony Green, the pair composed all of the music. "Secret Rendez-Vous" peaked at #43 on Billboard Magazine's, Hot Dance Club Songs chart.

== Personnel ==
=== Vocalists ===
- Cindy Valentine (featured artist)

Backing Vocals

- Vivian Cherry
- Dennis Collins
- Diva Gray
- Milt Grayson
- Hilda Harris
- Howard Hewett
- David Lasley
- Cheryl Lynn
- Deborah McDuffie
- Angela Clemmons Patrick
- Myrna Smith Schicung
- Fonzie Thornton
- Joey Ward
- Luther Vandross

=== Musicians ===
- Michael Brecker – saxophone
- Tony Bridges – electric bass, synth
- David Edmead – keyboards, synth, drum programming
- Tony Green – keyboards
- Bashiri Johnson – percussion
- Martin Klein – drum programming
- Paul Pesco – guitar
- Doc Powell – guitar
- Tony Prendatt – keyboards, synth, drum programming
- Craig Snyder – guitar
- Roger Squitero – percussion
- Ed Terry – keyboards, synth, drum programming
- Jeff Vilinsky – keyboards, drum programming

=== Production ===
- Mark Berry – producer (tracks: A1)
- Carol Cafiero – asst. engineer
- Brian Davis – photography
- Jerome Gasper – executive production, mastering
- Tony Green – production, musical arrangement, written by (tracks: All), mixing
- Roger Guerin – engineering
- Don Hahn – engineering
- Sylvain Jacob – engineering
- Matthew "Krash" Kasha – mixing, engineering
- Bill Levy – art direction
- Lenny Manchess – engineering
- Deborah McDuffie – background vocal arrangement
- Jay Pollock – asst. engineer
- Tony Prendatt – producer (arrangement), mixing
- Jose Rodriguez – mastering
- Ed Terry – engineering
- Cindy Valentine – written by (tracks: All)
- Tom Vercillo – asst. engineer
- Jeff Vilinsky – musical arrangement (tracks: A5, B2),

== Track listing ==
=== LP album ===
Secret Rendez-Vous (1987)
No.	Title	Writer(s)	Length
1.	"In Your Midnight Hour" (single)	C. Valentine, T. Green	4:25
2.	"Heartless"	C. Valentine, T. Green	4:15
3.	"Don't Give Up"	A.Mazzone (T. Green), C. Valentine	4:14
4.	"Try Your Luck"	C. Valentine, T. Green	3:52
5.	"A Fine Mess"	C. Valentine, T. Green	4:27
6.	"Secret Rendez-Vous" (single)	C. Valentine, T. Green	4:52
7.	"Savage"	C. Valentine, T. Green	5:00
8.	"Fight the Feeling"	C. Valentine, T. Green	4:25
9.	"Hungry Love"	C. Valentine, T. Green	3:58

=== Singles ===
"Secret Rendez-vous"

Single by Cindy Valentine

from the album Secret Rendez-vous
- A-side: "Secret Rendez-vous"
- B-side: "In Your Midnight Hour"
- Released: 1987
- Genre: Electronic, Pop
- Label: Polydor
- Songwriters: T. Green, C. Valentine
- Producer: Tony Green

Cindy Valentine singles chronology
"Big Kiss" (1984)	"Secret Rendez-vous" (1987)	"In Your Midnight Hour" (1987)

Secret Rendez-vous (October 10, 1987)	Peak position
Billboard Hot Dance Club Songs	#43

==== Secret Rendez-vous ====
Secret Rendez-Vous (1987)
No.	Title	Length
1.	"Secret Rendez-Vous" (club mix)	6:30
2.	"Secret Rendez-Vous" (drumapella)	4:41
3.	"Secret Rendez-Vous" (instrumental)	4:40
4.	"Secret Rendez-Vous" (emu-beat)	3:35
5.	"Secret Rendez-Vous" (bonus beats)	4:30
6.	"In Your Midnight Hour" (7" remix edit)	4:25

==== In Your Midnight Hour ====
"In Your Midnight Hour"

Single by Cindy Valentine

from the album Secret Rendez-vous
- A-side: "In Your Midnight Hour"
- B-side: "Work It Out"
- Released: 1987
- Genre: Electronic, Pop
- Label: Polydor
- Songwriters: T. Green, C. Valentine
- Producer: Tony Green

Cindy Valentine singles chronology
"Secret Rendez-vous" (1987)	"In Your Midnight Hour" (1987)	"Pick Up The Pieces (To My Heart)" (1989)

In Your Midnight Hour (1987)
No.	Title	Length
1.	"In Your Midnight Hour" (12" club mix)	6:12
2.	"In Your Midnight Hour" (7" version)	3:59
3.	"In Your Midnight Hour" (dub mix)	4:52
4.	"Work It Out"	3:40
