= Alien Intruder =

1993 film by Ricardo Jacques Gale

- Directed by: Ricardo Jacques Gale
- Written by: Nick Stone; Marcus Mcnaughton
- Produced by: Joseph Merhi; Richard Pepin
- Starring: Billy Dee Williams; Jeff Conaway; Maxwell Caulfield; Tracy Scoggins
- Cinematography: Michael Pinkey
- Edited by: Ron Cabreros; Lorne Morris; Paul G. Volk; Peter Volk
- Music by: Miriam Cutler
- Distributed by: PM Entertainment Group
- Release date: 1993
- Running time: 94 minutes
- Country: United States
- Language: English

Alien Intruder is a 1993 action/science-fiction film directed by Ricardo Jacques Gale and written by Nick Stone. It stars Maxwell Caulfield, Tracy Scoggins, Billy Dee Williams, Gary Roberts, Richard Cody, and Stephen Davies.

== Plot ==
Set in 2022, several convicts sentenced to life in prison are led on a mission into uncharted deep space by Commander Skyler (Williams) to salvage a lost ship. Should they survive their mission, their sentence will be commuted. Astronaut Borman had killed the crew of the lost ship.

While on the way to the ship, the convicts are allowed into a virtual reality world where they could live out their sexual fantasies with any woman they choose.

However, Ariel (Scoggins), a woman who is not part of the virtual reality program appears in it, kills each virtual woman, and seduces each convict. When Ariel begins to appear outside the program, she manipulates the men, who quickly turn on each other.

== Cast ==
- Borman (Jeff Conaway)
- Ariel (Tracy Scoggins)
- Commander Skyler (Billy Dee Williams)
- Nick (Maxwell Caulfield)
- D.J. (Richard Cody)
- Peter (Stephen Davies)
- Lloyd (Gary Roberts)

== Production ==
The virtual reality sequences are parodies of Casablanca, Westerns and Motorcycle films. "Broadway Joe" Murphy provided many of the stunts in the film. The film was produced and distributed by PM Entertainment.

== Reception ==
Creature Feature gave the movie 2 out of 5 stars, finding the effects to undermine the films good intentions. TV Guide found that the film wasn't as good as the idea, giving the film one of five stars. Entertainment Weekly gave the film a D+ finding the film crude.

== Home release ==
Alien Intruder was released on both VHS and DVD.
