= Hear What I Say =

Studio album by C. C. Catch
- Released: November 2, 1989
- Recorded: 1988–1989
- Genres: Dance-pop; new jack swing; pop
- Length: 42:26
- Label: Metronome
- Producers: Andy Taylor; Dave Clayton; Jo Dworniak; Avenue

C. C. Catch chronology
Big Fun (1988)	Hear What I Say (1989)

Singles from Hear What I Say
- 1. "Big Time" Released: September 25, 1989; 2. "Midnight Hour" Released: 1989

Hear What I Say is the fifth and final studio album by Dutch-German singer C. C. Catch, released on November 2, 1989 by Metronome. It was her first album not produced by Dieter Bohlen; instead, it was primarily produced by Andy Taylor, known for his work with Duran Duran and The Power Station. The album features a shift in musical direction, incorporating influences from house music, funk and new jack swing. It includes the singles "Big Time", which reached number 26 in Germany and "Midnight Hour".

== Track listing ==
Hear What I Say track listing
No.	Title	Writer(s)	Producer(s)	Length
1.	"Midnight Hour"	Cindy Valentine; Tony Green	Andy Taylor	4:35
2.	"Big Time"	Georg Koppenhelle; Martin Kppenhelle; C. C. Catch	Avenue (Georg and Martin Kppenhelle)	3:51
3.	"Love Away"	Dave Clayton; Jo Dworniak; C. C. Catch	Jo Dworniak; Dave Clayton	4:12
4.	"Give Me What I Want"	Dave Clayton; Jo Dworniak; C. C. Catch	Jo Dworniak; Dave Clayton	3:47
5.	"I'm Gonna Miss You"	Peter Szimmaneck; Mennana Szimmaneck	Andy Taylor	5:40
6.	"Backgirl"	Andreas Van Kane; Nicholas Marriot	Andy Taylor	3:31
7.	"Can't Catch Me"	Dave Clayton; Jo Dworniak; C. C. Catch	Jo Dworniak; Dave Clayton	3:51
8.	"Hear What I Say"	Dave Clayton; Jo Dworniak; C. C. Catch	Jo Dworniak; Dave Clayton	3:49
9.	"Nothing's Gonna Change Our Love"	Dave Clayton; Jo Dworniak; C. C. Catch	Jo Dworniak; Dave Clayton	3:50
10.	"Feels Like Heaven"	Dave Clayton; Jo Dworniak; C. C. Catch	Jo Dworniak; Dave Clayton	5:20

== Personnel ==
Adapted from the album's liner notes.

- Andy Taylor – production (tracks 1, 5, 6)
- Dave Clayton – production, songwriting (tracks 3, 4, 7–10)
- Jo Dworniak – production, songwriting (tracks 3, 4, 7–10)
- C. C. Catch – songwriting (tracks 3, 4, 7–10)
- Michael Behr – cover design
- Brian Aris – cover photography
- Ian Cooper – mastering
- Simon Napier-Bell – management
- Peta Hunt – stylist
- Keith Harris – hair stylist
- Sara Raeburn – make-up artist

== Charts ==
Weekly chart performance for Hear What I Say
Chart (1989)	Peak position
Finnish Albums (Suomen virallinen lista)	35
German Albums (Offizielle Top 100)	75
Spanish Albums (AFYVE)	46
