= Secret Rendezvous (band) =

Dutch musical duo

Secret Rendezvous is a band consisting of members Sietske Morsch and Remi Lauw. The duo met when they both studied pop music at the Codarts Conservatory in Rotterdam and formed the band Secret Rendezvous after graduating. They produce all their music themselves and are influenced by a variety of artists like Frank Ocean, Janet Jackson, Prince and Lizzo.

== History ==
Paint the Town Red

Secret Rendezvous released their debut album Paint the Town Red in 2011. The album was well received by blogs and media worldwide. The song "Secret Rendezvous" was chosen by Coldplay for the Hypnofeed "song of the day". In 2012, their album was released by Sweet Soul Records in Japan and in 2013 Secret Rendezvous played at the Liverpool Sound City festival. The single "Homie. Lover. Friend." is played by national radio 3FM, 22tracks Paris, 3voor12 radio and SlamFM. The self-directed video of "Homie. Lover. Friend." was premiered on Vevo.

Touring and singles

In the fall of 2015 Secret Rendezvous did a Dutch try-out tour during the Popronde festival. In October 2015 Secret Rendezvous was elected "3FM Serious Talent." This led to airplay on 3FM and an appearance in the "Glazen Huis" during Serious Request 2015 in Heerlen where Secret Rendezvous played a well received cover of Adele’s hit single "Hello".

In April 2016, Secret Rendezvous released the single "Better Than She Can." The song gained attention from French blog Pause Musicale, Vevo NL and MTV France and this led to performances on 3FM, QMusic Belgium and Nuba in Paris. Furthermore, the song was added to the playlist of the Beats1 radio show from Pharrell Williams and Scott Vener.

In November 2016, the band performed at the MTV Music Week in Rotown Rotterdam where they launched their single "What About Us". The animated music video by Nepanto received critical acclaim by blogs worldwide.

On June 1, 2017, Secret Rendezvous released their single "Don't Look at Me That Way", which reached the viral 50 on Spotify NL and various playlists. On September 22, the second album For Real. was released and got featured by OOR, Viva, BBC Radio 1Xtra, Spindle Magazine and Earmilk, and resulted in support shows for Zak Abel and Zara Larsson. By November 2017 the album had reached over 1 million streams.

In 2018 their songs "What About Us" and "Better Than She Can" were featured on Love Island Australia. In the spring and summer of 2018 they toured in Europe and played on festivals like The Great Escape Festival, Mundial and Delft Jazz. In 2019 they signed a record deal with Boogie Angst and on January 31, 2020, they released their EP Back in the Day. The singles "Your Love" and "Back in the Day" received international airplay on various soul, R&B, alternative and pop stations in the US, UK and Australia a.o. In March 2020 Back in the Day (The Remixes) was released.

In 2021, "Back in the Day (High Hoops Flip)" was featured in American shows Good Trouble and The Last O.G.

In July 2022, they released "Feels So Good (Don't It)", which was featured on Love Island NL and added to the Dutch playlists of Sublime and Radio 2 Soul & Jazz. In November 2022, they released their 2nd single, "Crush".

In February 2023, the single "Feels So Good (Don't It)" was nominated as Best Song at the Sublime Awards.

In July 2024 they released their single “Say The Word”.

July 2025 they released their single “Mutual” and on September 26 they launched their new album “In Between Dreams".
