= Big Fun (C.C. Catch album) =

1988 studio album by C.C. Catch

Studio album by C. C. Catch
- Released: December 12, 1988
- Recorded: 1988
- Genres: Eurodisco; Pop
- Label: Hansa Records
- Producer: Dieter Bohlen

C. C. Catch chronology
Like a Hurricane (1987)	Big Fun (1988)	Hear What I Say (1989)

Singles from Big Fun
- 1. "Backseat of Your Cadillac" Released: October 10, 1988; 2. "Nothing But a Heartache" Released: February 13, 1989; 3. "Summer Kisses" Released: May 15, 1989; 4. "Baby I Need Your Love" Released: August 28, 1989

Big Fun is the fourth studio album by Dutch-German singer C. C. Catch, released on December 12, 1988 by Hansa Records. It is the artist's final album produced by Dieter Bohlen.

== Track listing ==
All tracks are written by Dieter Bohlen

No.	Title	Length
1.	"Backseat of Your Cadillac"	3:24
2.	"Summer Kisses"	3:51
3.	"Are You Serious"	3:07
4.	"Night in Africa"	4:09
5.	"Heartbeat City"	3:38
6.	"Baby I Need Your Love"	3:03
7.	"Little by Little"	3:06
8.	"Nothing but a Heartache"	3:02
9.	"If I Feel Love"	3:42
10.	"Fire of Love"	3:00
Total length:		34:02

== Personnel ==
Adapted from the album's liner notes.

- Dieter Bohlen – production, arrangement
- Luis Rodríguez – co-production

== Charts ==
Weekly chart performance for Big Fun
Chart (1989)	Peak position
Finnish Albums (Suomen virallinen lista)	31
German Albums (Offizielle Top 100)	53
Spanish Albums (AFYVE)	22
