= Mannequin Two: On the Move =

- Theatrical release poster
- Directed by: Stewart Raffill
- Written by: Edward Rugoff; Michael Gottlieb; David Isaacs; Ken Levine; Betsy Israel
- Produced by: Edward Rugoff
- Starring: Kristy Swanson; William Ragsdale; Terry Kiser; Stuart Pankin; Meshach Taylor
- Cinematography: Larry Pizer
- Edited by: John Rosenberg; Joan E. Chapman
- Music by: David McHugh
- Production company: Gladden Entertainment
- Distributed by: 20th Century Fox
- Release date: May 17, 1991
- Running time: 95 minutes
- Country: United States
- Language: English
- Budget: $13 million
- Box office: $3.8 million

Mannequin Two: On the Move is a 1991 romantic comedy film and a sequel to the 1987 film Mannequin. The film stars Kristy Swanson as a "peasant girl" named Jessie who is enchanted by evil sorcerer Spretzel's magic necklace, freezing her in the form of a wooden mannequin. She is to remain frozen for one thousand years, or until the necklace is removed by the person who will be her true love. In modern-day Philadelphia, she is freed by Jason Williamson (William Ragsdale), a new employee of the Prince & Company department store and the descendant of Jessie's original love Prince William. The two fall in love while avoiding Count Gunther Spretzle (Terry Kiser), the descendant of the evil sorcerer.

The original film's theme song "Nothing's Gonna Stop Us Now" by Starship, written by Diane Warren and Albert Hammond, was featured in this film. The original music score was composed by David McHugh. Though the sequel takes place in the same Philadelphia department store Prince & Company as the original film, only actors Meshach Taylor and Andrew Hill Newman returned from the original film. Taylor reprises the role of Hollywood Montrose and briefly references having witnessed a similar romance during the first film.

== Plot ==
In AD 991, Prince William of the Germanic kingdom of Hauptmann-Koenig falls in love with a peasant girl named Jessie. Not approving of the romance, William's mother, the queen, plots with her court sorcerer Spretzel, who enchants a necklace intended for Jessie. Putting on the necklace, she is transformed into a wooden statue and the magic prevents William from freeing her. He is told Jessie will be frozen for a thousand years and can only wake earlier if a true love from another land removes the necklace. Angry, William declares the kingdom will then also be cursed for a thousand years. Perpetual rainfall begins.

1000 years later in 1991, Hauptmann-Koenig is a poor country enduring endless rain and financial hardship. Jessie is a museum piece in the castle, where a tour guide recites the fairy tale of the "Enchanted Peasant Girl". To boost tourism, Count Gunther Spretzle sends the statue to be displayed at a dramatic stage presentation at the Prince & Company department store in Philadelphia, celebrating Hauptmann-Koenig's history and culture. Spretzle is secretly the descendant of the sorcerer, and plots to use the fairy tale to make a soon-to-be awakened Jessie his bride and then escape to Bermuda with his henchmen Arnold, Rolf & Egon, using stolen crown jewels to fund his retirement.

In the Germantown section of Northwest Philadelphia, Jason Williamson, the reincarnation of William, lives with his mother who runs a matchmaking service. He works at Prince & Company where store manager Mr. James makes him assistant to visual merchandising head Hollywood Montrose, who is directing the Enchanted Peasant Girl presentation. When the delivery truck with the Hauptmann-Koenig artifacts crashes over the Schuylkill River, Hollywood and Jason arrive on the scene. Seeing a female figure fall into the river, Jason saves her, only then realizing it is the statue from Europe, and obliviously restores Jessie to life briefly by touching her necklace. Romantically drawn to Jessie, he takes her to the store, where he removes her necklace and is shocked when she comes to life. Learning she is in the future, Jessie concludes Jason is William reincarnated. Jason shows Jessie the modern world and they have a whirlwind romance, sharing their feelings, dreams, and cultures with each other. The next morning, unaware of its magic, Jessie puts on her necklace and is frozen again. Heartbroken and unsure what to do, Jason returns the statue to the store.

Admiring Jessie's necklace, Hollywood tries it on, becoming a statue and restoring her to life. Jessie leaves to explore the mall. Spretzle's henchmen find Hollywood, remove the necklace, then rush to find Jessie. The Queen of Hauptmann-Koenig then calls Spretzle, warning him she knows the crown jewels are missing. Recognizing Jason as William reincarnated, Spretzle tries to kill him. Seeing Spretzle's henchmen, Jessie takes a go-kart and escapes to Jason's home, only for Spretzle and the authorities to follow Jason there. The count confronts Jessie alone and puts the necklace on her. Seeing her frozen again, Jason realizes the necklace is cursed and demands it be removed. The cops, believing he is unhealthily fixated on a mannequin, arrest him for theft. Spretzle wants to leave with Jessie but James reminds him of the presentation for the next day.

The next day, Hollywood dresses in his former US Marine Corps uniform and bluffs a policeman into releasing Jason into his custody. At the Enchanted Peasant Girl presentation, Jason removes Jessie's necklace on stage, restoring her to life in front of spectators who assume it is part of the show. Enraged, Spretzle takes Jessie hostage and forces her into his hot air balloon. Jason follows and they struggle. Jessie puts the necklace on Spretzle, repeating the ancient curse. The now-frozen Spretzle is knocked out of the balloon and smashes into pieces on the street.

Later in Hauptmann-Koenig, the glued together Spretzle statue is the castle centerpiece and inspires his own fairy tale. Meanwhile, newly married Jason and Jessie pick up a new necklace at Prince & Company before leaving on their honeymoon.

== Cast ==
- Kristy Swanson as Jessie
- William Ragsdale as Jason Williamson/Prince William
- Meshach Taylor as Hollywood Montrose/Club Doorman
- Terry Kiser as Count Gunther Spretzle/Sorcerer
- Stuart Pankin as Mr. James
- Cynthia Harris as Mom/Queen
- Andrew Hill Newman as Andy Ackerman
- Julie Foreman as Gail
- John Edmondson as Rolf, Spretzle's henchman
- Phil Latella as Egon, Spretzle's henchman
- Mark Gray as Arnold, Spretzle's henchman
- Robert Pilarski as Bob

== Production ==
The film Mannequin had been financially successful and the production company Gladden Entertainment wanted a sequel. A script was written and David Begelman hired Stewart Raffill, who had made The Ice Pirates (1984) for Begelman earlier, to direct. Raffill said his philosophy was "just to play the humor" and look for interesting reactions to the situations. Filming took place in Philadelphia at Wanamaker's department store (currently Macy's Center City). Raffill said that Kristy Swanson "was a charm to work with".

== Soundtrack ==
Track list: Mannequin Two: On the Move
Title:	Performed by:	Produced by:	Courtesy of:	Composed by:
"Do It For Love"	Gene Miller	Phil Galdston; John Van Tongeren		John Van Tongeren; Phil Galdston
"Wake Up"	Gene Miller	Phil Galdston; John Van Tongeren		John Van Tongeren; Phil Galdston
"Can't Believe My Eyes"	Gene Miller	Jon Lind		John Bettis; Jon Lind
"Pick Up the Pieces (To My Heart)"	Cindy Valentine	Tony Green for TGO Records, Ltd.	Arista Records, Inc.	Cindy Valentine; Tony Green
"Casa De Coati"	Meshach Taylor; Coati Mundi	Coati Mundi		Coati Mundi
"The Sea Hawk"				Erich Wolfgang Korngold
"Feel the Way I Do"	Shoes	Shoes	Black Vinyl Records	John Murphy
"That Love Thang"	E*I*E*I*O	Phil Bonanno & E*I*E*I*O	Frontier Records	Richard Szeluga; David Kendrick
"Nothing's Gonna Stop Us Now"	Starship	Narada Michael Walden	RCA Records	Albert Hammond; Diane Warren

== Reception ==
Unlike its predecessor, it was a box office bomb, grossing just less than $4 million against its $13 million budget.

On Rotten Tomatoes, it has an approval rating of 12% based on reviews from 25 critics, with the critic consensus being “Chock full of clichéd gags and glaring product placement, Mannequin: On the Move is even more lifeless than its woeful predecessor.” Audiences surveyed by CinemaScore gave the film a grade of "B" on scale of A+ to F. This sequel was dubbed as "one of the worst follow-ups ever made."

Variety gave it a negative review: "It took four writers to struggle with another idea of why a mannequin would come to life in a department store and what would happen if she did." Kevin Thomas of the Los Angeles Times called it "even more feeble than the original" and "insipid in the extreme".

David Cornelius of DVD Talk called it "as woefully incompetent as its predecessor".

== Home media ==
Mannequin Two: On the Move was first released on VHS and LaserDisc in 1992 by Live Home Video. MGM Home Entertainment released the film to DVD for the first time on January 16, 2008, as part of a double feature two-disc set with the first Mannequin as the first disc. Mannequin Two: On the Move was released on Blu-ray for the first time by Olive Films (under license from MGM) on September 22, 2015.
