= Like a Hurricane (album) =

Studio album by C. C. Catch
- Released: October 26, 1987
- Recorded: 1987
- Genres: Eurodisco; pop
- Length: 36:45
- Label: Hansa Records
- Producer: Dieter Bohlen

C. C. Catch chronology
Welcome to the Heartbreak Hotel (1986)	Like a Hurricane (1987)	Big Fun (1988)

Singles from Like a Hurricane
- 1. "Are You Man Enough" Released: May 11, 1987; 2. "Soul Survivor" Released: September 21, 1987; 3. "Good Guys Only Win in Movies" Released: 1988

Like a Hurricane is the third studio album by Dutch-German singer C. C. Catch, released on October 26, 1987 by Hansa Records. The album was produced by Dieter Bohlen, who also wrote all the tracks. It was a commercial success across Europe, aided by the hit singles "Are You Man Enough" and "Soul Survivor".

== Track listing ==
All tracks are written by Dieter Bohlen

No.	Title	Length
1.	"Good Guys Only Win in Movies" (Long version)	5:42
2.	"Like a Hurricane"	3:13
3.	"Smokey Joe's Café"	3:41
4.	"Are You Man Enough"	3:36
5.	"Don't Be a Hero"	3:32
6.	"Soul Survivor" (Long version)	5:13
7.	"Midnight Gambler" (Long version)	4:29
8.	"Don't Wait Too Long"	3:22
9.	"Dancing in Shadows"	3:34
Total length:		36:19

== Personnel ==
- Dieter Bohlen – production
- Luis Rodríguez – co-production
- Herbert W. Hesselmann – photography

== Charts ==
Weekly chart performance for Like a Hurricane
Chart (1987)	Peak position
Finnish Albums (Suomen virallinen lista)	2
German Albums (Offizielle Top 100)	30
Spanish Albums (AFYVE)	25
Greece	30
Yugoslavia	2
