= C. C. Catch =

Dutch and German singer (born 1964)

C.C. Catch
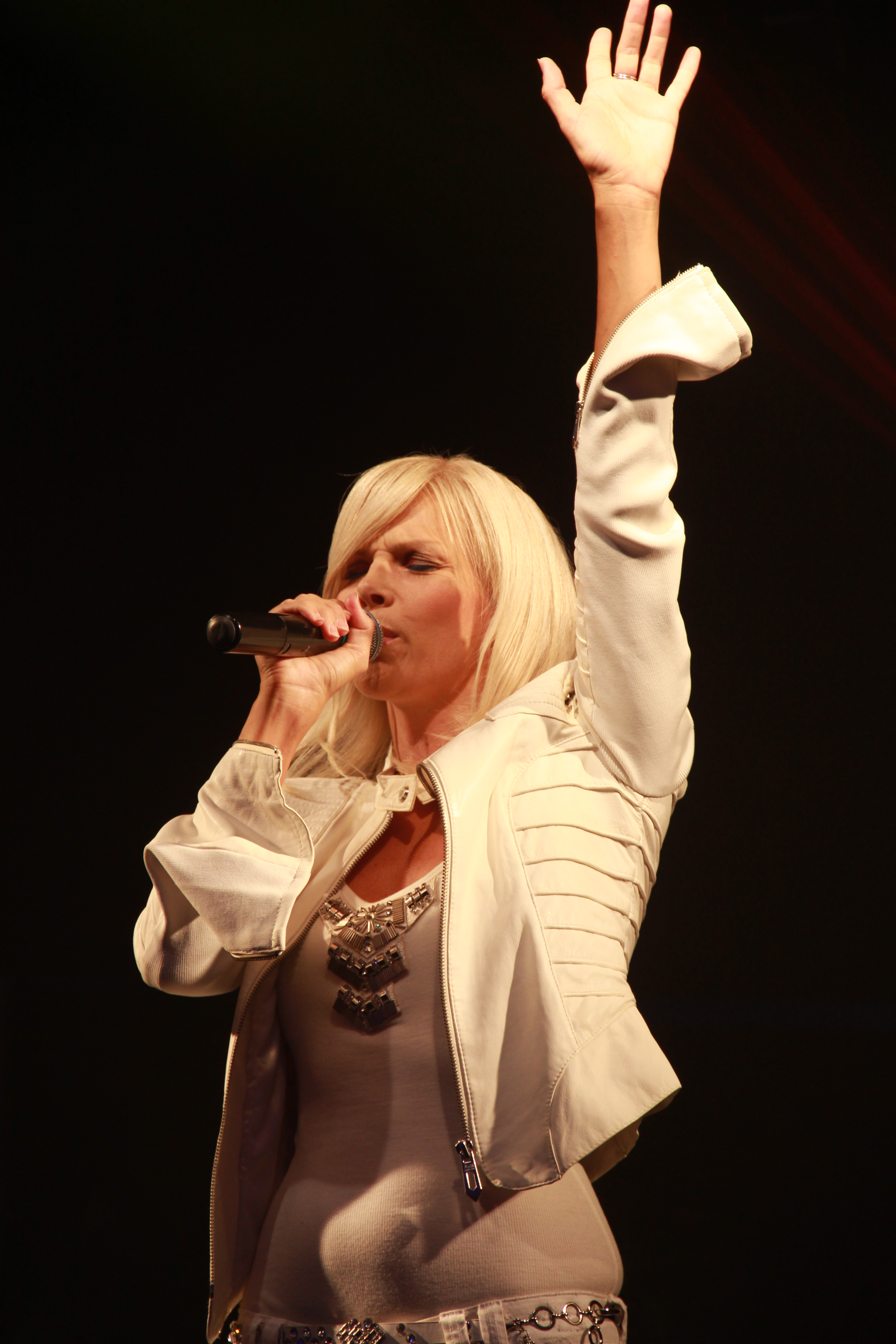
- Catch in 2011

Background information
- Born: Caroline Catherine Müller; July 31, 1964 (age 62); Oss, North Brabant, Netherlands
- Origin: West Germany
- Genres: Pop; synth-pop; Eurodisco
- Occupation: Singer
- Instruments: Vocals; guitar
- Years active: 1983–present
- Label: Hansa Records
- Website: www.cccatch.de

Caroline Catherine Müller (born July 31, 1964), known professionally as C.C. Catch, is a Dutch and German singer. She is known for her collaboration with Dieter Bohlen (one half of Modern Talking) in the 1980s.

== Early life ==
C.C. Catch was born Caroline Catherine Müller in the Netherlands to a Dutch mother and a German father and moved to West Germany with her family in the late 1970s. From an early age, she was supported by her parents, who recognised her talent and encouraged her dream of being a famous singer. Her father, Peter Müller, a musician himself, was especially supportive and played an important role in her career as her manager and tour-manager.

Still in her teens, she took part in talent contests and later joined the West German girl quartet Optimal, who released their first single, "Er War Magnetisch", in 1983.

== Musical career ==
While performing in Hamburg as part of Optimal, Müller was discovered by Dieter Bohlen. He signed her to BMG, effectively launching her solo career. Bohlen also gave her the stage name C.C. Catch, with the two "C"s standing for the initials of her first and middle names, and "Catch", which she thought was a good idea and looked good alongside the initials.

In the summer of 1985, C.C. Catch released her debut single, "I Can Lose My Heart Tonight". The single entered the top 20 in several European countries, including West Germany and Switzerland.

Bohlen and Catch worked together until 1989, during which time they released twelve singles and four albums. Eight of those singles entered the top 20, while one of the albums entered the top 10. Catch wanted to have more creative input into her songs, but Bohlen refused. As a result, in 1989, she parted ways with him and BMG. However, she had to pursue legal action to secure the rights to her stage name.

On a New Year's Eve television show in Spain, Catch met Simon Napier-Bell (former manager of Wham!'s George Michael). Shortly afterwards, Napier-Bell became her manager and signed her to PolyGram subsidiary Metronome. Her first (and only) album on the label, Hear What I Say, was released at the end of 1989 and remains Catch's last album to date. It was produced by Andy Taylor (ex-Duran Duran), Dave Clayton (who has worked with George Michael and U2), and Jo Dworniak. This time, Catch had more creative control, co-writing seven of the album's tracks. The album sold more than her previous two releases, Big Fun and Diamonds, demonstrating her abilities as an artist working on her own terms.

From this album, "Big Time" was released as a single in 1989, and peaked at No. 26 in West Germany. During this time, BMG also released the single "Baby I Need Your Love", along with the compilation Classics. Second single from "Hear What I Say" album was "Midnight Hour" in early 1990.

== Hiatus ==
Afterwards, C.C. Catch parted with Metronome on good terms to take time out from the music industry. During this time, she focused on her spiritual growth, practicing yoga and a form of meditation; she also started writing her own songs.

At the beginning of the 1990s, C.C. Catch worked on a project by Peter Gabriel from which the song "Harmonix" emerged. It appeared on Jam Nation's 1993 album "Way Down Below Buffalo Hell". In 1998, she returned to Germany, released the single "Megamix '98" and appeared on the BBC music television program Top of the Pops with rapper Krayzee.

In 2003, her single "Shake Your Head" reached the top 12 sales charts in Spain in 2003 and developed into a summer hit in southern Europe. In 2004, C.C. Catch took part in the ProSieben show Comeback - Die Big Chance. From this show emerged the single "Survivor" and the album Comeback United, on which the participating artists such as: C.C. Catch, Limahl, Chris Norman, Benjamin Boyce, Coolio, Jazzy von Tic Tac Toe, Haddaway, Emilia and the Weather Girls contributed various songs. In the same year, she appeared on the US tour of pop duo Modern Talking.

In September 2010, the single "Unborn Love" was released, a collaboration with Spanish music producer Juan Martinez.

In 2015, C.C. Catch toured the United States, including Los Angeles, Dallas and Chicago, followed by the first major concert in Toronto, Canada in 2016, followed by a concert tour of South America in 2017 (Argentina and Bolivia).

On July 31, 2024, she released a new single, "Heal Me" (produced by Luis Rodriguez), as a tribute to her father, Peter Müller, who died in April.

C.C. Catch... in:
1989	2002	2002	2006

== Discography ==
=== Studio albums ===
Title	Album details	Peak chart positions							Certifications
Title	Album details	GER	AUT	FIN	NOR	SPA	SWE	SWI	Certifications
Catch the Catch	Released: 1986; Label: Hansa; Formats: CD, LP, Cassette	6	24	17	6	21	25	8	
Welcome to the Heartbreak Hotel	Released: 1986; Label: Hansa; Formats: CD, LP, Cassette	28	—	40	—	22	44	—	SPA: Gold
Like a Hurricane	Released: 1987; Label: Hansa; Formats: CD, LP, Cassette	30	—	2	—	25	—	—	
Big Fun	Released: 1988; Label: Hansa; Formats: CD, LP, Cassette	53	—	31	—	22	—	—	SPA: Platinum
Hear What I Say	Released: 1989; Label: Metronome Musik; Formats: CD, LP, Cassette	75	—	35	—	46	—	—	
The Album (Remastered)	Released: 10 August 2017; Label: Italo Box Music; Formats: CD	—	—	—	—	—	—	—	
"—" denotes items which were not released in that country or failed to chart.

=== Compilation albums ===
Title	Album details	Peak chart positions			Certifications
Title	Album details	GER	FIN	SPA	Certifications
Diamonds: Her Greatest Hits	Released: 16 May 1988; Label: Hansa; Formats: CD, LP, Cassette	43	23	25	SPA: Gold
Super 20	Released: 2 January 1990; Label: Ariola Express; Formats: CD, LP, Cassette	—	—	—	
Backseat of Your Cadillac	Released: 1991; Label: Ariola Express; Formats: CD, LP, Cassette	—	—	—	
Super Disco Hits	Released: 2 May 1994; Label: Ariola Express; Formats: CD, LP, Cassette	—	—	—	
Best of '98	Released: 1998; Label: Hansa; Formats: CD, LP, Cassette	76	—	—	
Heartbreak Hotel	Released: 3 July 2000; Label: Ariola Express; Formats: CD, Cassette	—	—	—	
Best of C. C. Catch	Released: 18 September 2000; Label: Ariola Express; Formats: CD, Cassette	—	—	—	
In the Mix	Released: 12 May 2003; Label: Hansa; Formats: CD, Cassette	—	—	—	
Catch the Hits	Released: 16 September 2005; Label: Edel; Formats: CD, Cassette	—	—	—	
The 80's Album	Released: 28 October 2005; Label: Edel; Formats: CD	—	—	—	
Maxi Hit Sensation-Nonstop DJ	Released: 12 May 2006; Label: Edel; Formats: CD	—	—	—	
Ultimate C. C. Catch	Released: 23 November 2007; Label: Edel; Formats: CD	—	—	—	
25th Anniversary Box (5 CD)	Released: 11 November 2011; Label: 4ever Music; Formats: CD	—	—	—	
Hits & More	Released: 4 December 2017; Label: Frontline Productions & Records; Formats: CD	—	—	—	
Greatest Hits	Released: 5 October 2018; Label: Ear Music, Ear Music Classics; Formats: CD, FLAC	—	—	—	
The Best	Released: 5 August 2022; Label: Ear Music, Еdel; Formats: CD, LP	63	—	—	
"—" denotes items which were not released in that country or failed to chart.

=== Singles ===
Title	Year	Peak chart positions							Album
Title	Year	GER	AUT	BEL (FLA)	FIN	SPA	SWI	UK	Album
"I Can Lose My Heart Tonight"	1985	13	24	—	—	7	19	—	Catch the Catch
"'Cause You Are Young"	1986	9	28	—	—	6	8	—	Catch the Catch
"Strangers by Night"	1986	9	15	33	11	10	11	—	Catch the Catch
"Heartbreak Hotel"	1986	8	22	23	—	3	13	—	Welcome to the Heartbreak Hotel
"Heaven and Hell"	1986	13	—	—	—	2	19	—	Welcome to the Heartbreak Hotel
"Are You Man Enough"	1987	20	—	—	21	5	28	—	Like a Hurricane
"Soul Survivor"	1987	17	—	—	12	1	—	96	Like a Hurricane
"Good Guys Only Win in Movies"	1988	—	—	—	—	6	—	—	Like a Hurricane
"House of Mystic Lights"	1988	22	—	—	—	7	—	—	Diamonds: Her Greatest Hits
"Backseat of Your Cadillac"	1988	10	—	—	23	6	—	—	Big Fun
"Summer Kisses"	1988	—	—	—	—	—	—	—	Big Fun
"Nothing but a Heartache"	1989	39	—	—	10	14	—	—	Big Fun
"Baby I Need Your Love"	1989	—	—	—	—	—	—	—	Big Fun
"Big Time"	1989	26	—	—	22	—	—	—	Hear What I Say
"Midnight Hour"	1989	—	—	—	—	—	—	—	Hear What I Say
"C. C. Catch Megamix '98"	1998	33	—	—	—	—	—	—	Best of '98
"Soul Survivor '98"	1998	—	—	—	—	8	—	—	Best of '98
"I Can Lose My Heart Tonight '99"	1999	72	—	—	—	12	—	—	Best of '98
"Shake Your Head"	2003	—	—	—	—	12	—	—	Non-album singles
"Silence" (featuring Leela)	2004	—	—	—	—	—	—	—	Non-album singles
"Unborn Love"	2010	—	—	—	—	—	—	—	Non-album singles
"Another Night in Nashville" (with Chris Norman)	2014	—	—	—	—	—	—	—	Non-album singles
"Heal Me"	2024	—	—	—	—	—	—	—	
"—" denotes items which were not released in that country or failed to chart.
