= Pick Up the Pieces (To My Heart) =

Single by Cindy Valentine
- A-side: "Pick Up the Pieces (To My Heart)"
- B-side: "Choose Your Weapon"
- Released: 1989
- Genre: Electronic
- Label: Arista Records
- Songwriters: T. Green, C. Valentine
- Producer: Tony Greene

Cindy Valentine singles chronology
"In Your Midnight Hour" (1987)	"Pick Up the Pieces (To My Heart)" (1989)

"Pick Up the Pieces (To My Heart)" is a Cindy Valentine single co-written with Tony Green and released under Arista Records in 1989. "Pickup the Pieces (To My Heart)" climbed the Dance/Club chart, peaking at No. 11 in a 16-week chart run. "Pickup the Pieces (To My Heart)" was featured in the film, Mannequin Two: On the Move (1991), HBO's feature film, Just Can't Get Enough (2002) and is included on numerous compilation albums.

== Personnel ==
- Cindy Valentine - Vocals [Lead], backing vocals, keyboards, percussion
- Tony Green - Vocals, guitar, keyboards
- Roberto Deus - Keyboards, Drums, Bass [Synth.], Percussion
- Allan Pernot - Guitar [Solo]
- Martin Klein - Keyboards
- Martin Klein - Arrangements, engineering (asst.), mixing, programming
- Roberto Deus - Arrangements
- Marlene Cohen - Art Direction Of Photography
- Carolyn Quan - Artwork [Cover Design]
- Tod - Engineer [Additional]
- Alberto Tolot - Photography
- Tony Green - Producer, written-by, arrangements musical and vocals, mixing
- Cindy Valentine - Written-by, vocal arrangements

Notes

- Produced for TGO Rocords, Ltd.
- Pick Up the Pieces (To My Heart) (Extended Version) additional production for Pantera Productions
- Engineered at Unison Studios, Montreal
- Additional engineering at Wellesley Sound Studios, Toronto
- Additional production recorded at Countdown Studios, Miami, FL
- Remixed at International Sound, Miami

== Charts ==
Chart (1989)	Peak position
Billboard Hot Dance/Club Play	11

== Vinyl 7" ==
Pick Up the Pieces (To My Heart) (1989)
No.	Title	Length
1.	"Pick Up the Pieces (To My Heart) (Radio Version)" (Remix – Lewis A. Martineé)	9:44
2.	"Choose Your Weapon"	4:01

== Vinyl 12" ==
Pick Up The Pieces (To My Heart) (1989)
No.	Title	Length
1.	"Pick Up the Pieces (To My Heart) (Atomic Version)" (track (A1) Remix – Lewis A. Martineé, Rick "Billy Bob" Alonso)	9:44
2.	"Pick Up the Pieces (To My Heart) (Extended Version)" (track (A2) Remix – Lewis A. Martineé)	7:07
3.	"Pick Up the Pieces (To My Heart) (Cindy's Best Parts)" (track (B1))	6:10
4.	"Pick Up the Pieces (To My Heart) (Cindy's House)" (track (B2))	6:09
5.	"Pick Up the Pieces (To My Heart) (Radio Version)" (track (B3) Remix – Lewis A. Martineé)	4:09
