= Love in Paris =

- Official DVD cover from Trimark Home Video.
- Directed by: Anne Goursaud
- Screenplay by: Michael Davis
- Based on: Characters by Elizabeth McNeill
- Produced by: Yannick Bernard; Staffan Ahrenberg
- Starring: Mickey Rourke; Agathe de La Fontaine; Angie Everhart; Steven Berkoff; Werner Schreyer
- Cinematography: Robert Alazraki
- Edited by: Anne Goursaud; Terilyn A. Shropshire
- Music by: Francis Haines; Stephen W. Parsons
- Distributed by: Trimark Home Video (United States); M6 Films (France)
- Release dates: May 9, 1997 (Brazil); June 12, 1997
- Running time: 105 minutes
- Countries: United States; France; United Kingdom
- Language: English

Love in Paris (released as Another 9½ Weeks in the United States and the Philippines) is a 1997 American erotic romantic drama film. It is a sequel to the 1986 film 9½ Weeks.

Mickey Rourke reprises his role as John Gray from the original and Angie Everhart co-stars. The film, directed by Anne Goursaud was released directly to video in the United States, receiving poor reviews. The film is set ten years after the events first film, where Elizabeth McGraw (Kim Basinger) left John and ended their relationship.

== Plot ==
Ten years after Elizabeth McGraw left John Gray, John has descended into a world of depression and loneliness, and is suicidal. When he receives an invitation to attend an art exhibit in Paris that will feature some of Elizabeth's paintings, he immediately boards a plane for France, hoping to get to talk to her.

John arrives at the auction house and promptly wins all of her artwork, but Elizabeth is not there. But he does see a beautiful woman wearing exactly the same shawl that he gave Elizabeth many years earlier. The woman's name is Lea Calot. She says that she is Elizabeth's close friend and that Elizabeth is now living in another country, happily married.

John suspects there is something Lea is not telling him. It becomes apparent that Elizabeth told her intimate details of their relationship. Lea is a fashion designer, who is obviously romantically attracted towards John and he begins to warm up to her as well. They begin a romantic relationship, but Lea continues to be evasive when it comes to answering questions about Elizabeth.

John also becomes close to Lea's beautiful assistant, Claire, who is in an abusive relationship with her boyfriend, Charlie. As John comes closer to discovering the truth of Elizabeth's fate, he is forced to examine the ways in which his past actions have changed him as a person, and if he can be the kind of lover for Lea that she wants him to be.

== Cast ==
- Mickey Rourke as John Gray
- Agathe de La Fontaine as Claire
- Angie Everhart as Lea Calot
- Steven Berkoff as Vitorio DaSilva
- Dougray Scott as Charlie
- Werner Schreyer as Gilles
- Lana Clarkson as Fashion Show Woman
- Lucienne Legrand as Old Woman
- Samy Naceri as Drug Dealer
