= 1980s in music =

This article includes an overview of popular music in the 1980s.

The 1980s saw the emergence of electronic dance music and indie pop. As disco and new wave fell out of fashion in the decade's early years, genres such as post-disco, Italo disco, Euro disco, and dance-pop became more popular. Rock music continued to enjoy a wide audience. Soft rock, glam metal, thrash metal, shred guitar characterized by heavy distortion, pinch harmonics, and whammy bar abuse became very popular. Adult contemporary, quiet storm, and smooth jazz gained popularity. In the late 1980s, glam metal became the largest, most commercially successful brand of music worldwide.

The 1980s featured an increase in the use of digital recording, associated with the usage of synthesizers, with synth-pop music and other electronic genres featuring non-traditional instruments increasing in popularity. Also during this decade, several major electronic genres were developed, including electro, techno, house, freestyle, and Eurodance, rising in prominence during the 1990s and beyond. Throughout the decade, R&B, hip hop, and urban genres were becoming commonplace, particularly in the inner-city areas of large, metropolitan cities; rap was especially successful in the latter part of the decade, with the advent of the golden age of hip-hop. These urban genres—particularly rap and hip hop—would continue their rise in popularity through the 1990s and 2000s.

A 2010 survey conducted by the digital broadcaster Music Choice, which polled over 11,000 European participants, revealed that the 1980s was the most favoured tune decade of the last 40 years.

Artists from the 1980s include Michael Jackson, Duran Duran, Prince, Madonna, Whitney Houston, U2, Bruce Springsteen, George Michael, Phil Collins, and the Police.

== Economics ==
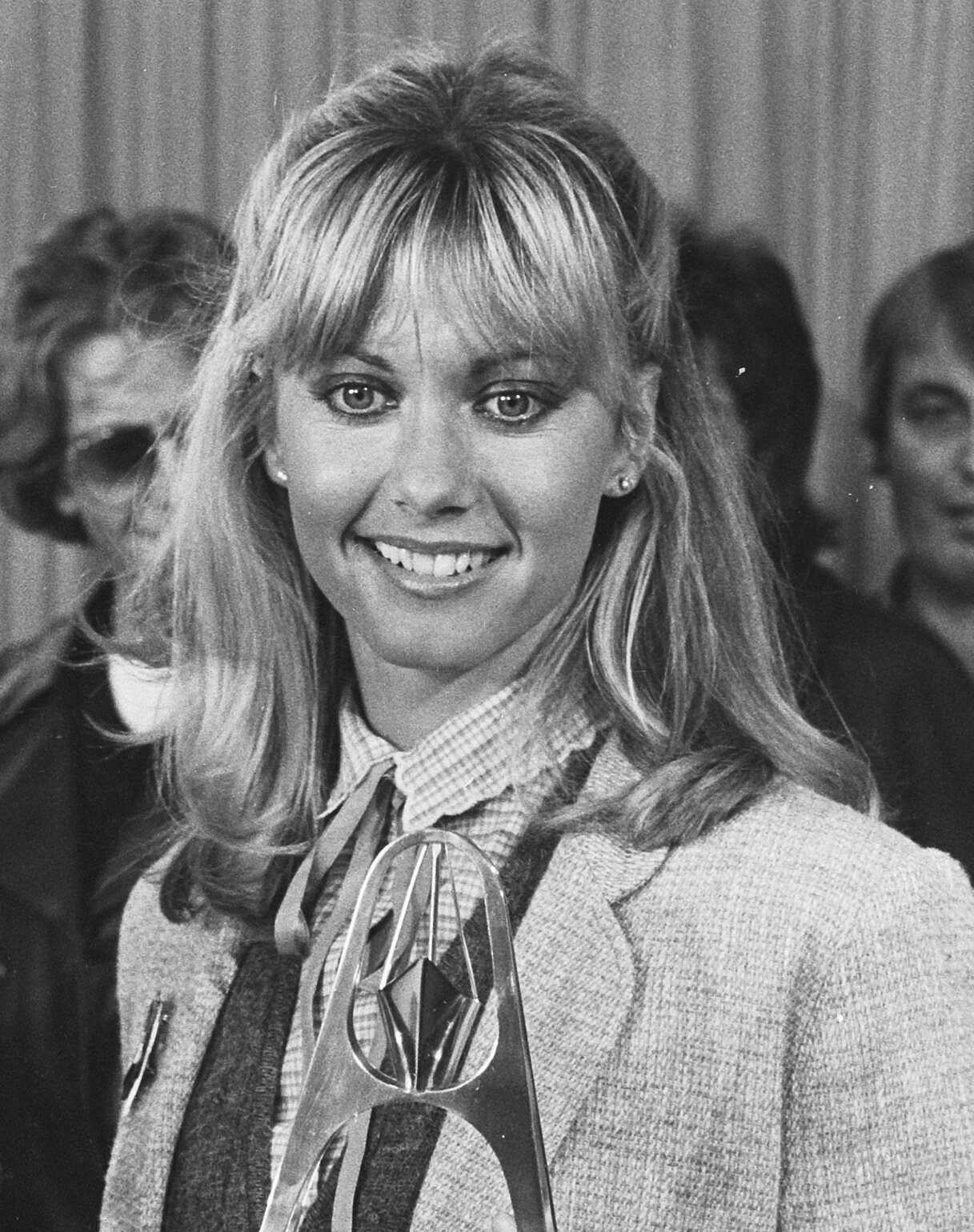
Olivia Newton-John's song "Physical" was the Billboard Hot 100's longest running number one of the decade.

Reflecting on changes in the music industry during the 1980s, Robert Christgau later wrote in Christgau's Record Guide: The '80s (1990):

The '80s were above all a time of international corporatization, as one major after another gave it up to media moguls in Europe and Japan. By 1990, only two of the six dominant American record companies were headquartered in the U.S. Bizzers acted locally while thinking globally in re audiences/markets (will it sell in Germany? Australia? Venezuela? Indonesia now that we've sunk the pirates? the U.S.S.R.?) and artists/suppliers (world music was a concept whose geoeconomic time had come). After a feisty start, independent labels accepted farm-team status that could lead to killings with the bigs. Cross-promotional hookah became the rule—the soundtrack album, the sponsored tour, the golden-oldie commercial, the T-shirt franchise, the video as song ad and pay-for-play programming and commodity fetish. Record executives became fewer impresarios than arbitragers, speculating in abstract bundles of rights whose physical characteristics meant little or nothing to them. Rock was mere music no longer. It was reconceived as intellectual property, as a form of capital itself.

According to Christgau, commercial stardom, as measured by music recording sales certifications, replaced artistry as an indication of a musician's significance. "When art is intellectual property, image and aura subsume aesthetic substance, whatever exactly that is", he explained. "When art is the capital, sales interface with aesthetic quality—Thriller's numbers are part of its experience."

== North America ==
=== Pop ===
The 1980s saw the reinvention of Michael Jackson, and the worldwide superstardom of Prince, Madonna, and Whitney Houston, who were all among the most successful musicians during this time.

Michael Jackson, along with Prince, was the first African-American artist to have his music videos in heavy rotation on MTV, with "Beat It", and "Billie Jean". (Donna Summer placed the first two videos by an African-American female artist, with "She Works Hard for the Money" and "Unconditional Love", both in 1983.) Jackson's Thriller (1982) is the best-selling album of all time, selling 25 million copies during the decade. The album had sold over 65 million copies. His other album, 1987's Bad, has the honour of being the first album in history to have five number-one singles on the Billboard Hot 100. Its accompanying world tour also made history by being the highest-grossing tour by a solo artist in the 1980s, as well as the highest-grossing at the time. In addition to being the biggest-selling artist of the decade, Jackson had nine number-one singles – more than any other artists during the decade – and spent the longest time at number one (27 weeks) in the 1980s. He won numerous awards, including "Artist of the Decade" and "Artist of the Century", and was arguably the biggest star of the 1980s.

Madonna was the best-selling female pop music artist of the decade. Her third studio release, True Blue, became the best-selling female album of the 1980s. Other Madonna albums from the decade include Like a Virgin, one of the best selling albums of all-time, and Like a Prayer ("As close to art as pop music gets," said Rolling Stone). Madonna made music videos a marketing tool and was among the first to make them an art form. Her songs topped several charts, such as: "Like a Virgin", "Papa Don't Preach", "La Isla Bonita" and "Like a Prayer". Madonna was named artist of the decade by several magazines and awards.

Whitney Houston was the best-selling female R&B artist of the decade. Her eponymous debut studio album was the best-selling debut album by a solo artist at the time, and her sophomore album Whitney is the first female album to debut at No. 1 in the Billboard 200. She also became the first and only artist to earn seven consecutive number-one songs on the Billboard Hot 100, from "Saving All My Love for You" in 1985 to "Where Do Broken Hearts Go" in 1988. Her crossover appeal on the popular music charts as well as her prominence on MTV influenced generations of African-American artists.

Paula Abdul hit it big in 1988. With her debut album Forever Your Girl, she was the first female to have four number-one singles from a debut album (only The Jackson 5 had done the same with their debut). She had five top ten hits from the album.

By 1980, the disco genre, largely dependent on orchestras, was replaced by a lighter synthpop production, which subsequently fuelled dance music.

In the latter half of the 1980s, teen pop experienced its first wave, with bands and artists including Exposé, Debbie Gibson, Tiffany, Belinda Carlisle, New Edition, Taylor Dayne, Stacey Q, The Bangles, New Kids on the Block, Laura Branigan, Michael Bolton, Brenda K. Starr, Boy George, Glenn Medeiros and others becoming teen idols.

Prominent American urban pop acts of the 1980s include Tina Turner, Lionel Richie, Michael Jackson, Donna Summer, Whitney Houston, Chaka Khan, and Diana Ross. African-American artists like Lionel Richie and Prince became some of the decade's biggest stars. Their hit albums included 1999, Purple Rain, and Sign o' the Times by Prince and Lionel Richie, Can't Slow Down, and Dancing on the Ceiling by Richie.

Prince was one of the decade's most prolific artists. He was responsible for artists such as Vanity 6, for whom he wrote the dance chart-topping "Nasty Girl"; Morris Day and The Time, for whom he wrote the top 20 "Jungle Love"; Sheila E., for whom he wrote the top ten songs "The Glamorous Life" and number 11 "A Love Bizarre"; and Wendy & Lisa and Apollonia 6. He wrote "I Feel for You" for Chaka Khan, which won him a Grammy for best R&B song; "Sugar Walls" for Sheena Easton; and as well as doing a duet with "U Got the Look", he wrote "Manic Monday", a number two pop hit for The Bangles. Artists that covered his music included Tom Jones, who brought his version of the song "Kiss" into the top 40 for the second time in the decade. Melissa Morgan brought her cover of "Do Me, Baby" to the top of the R&B charts in 1986. Other notable artists that covered Prince during the 1980s were The Pointer Sisters and Cyndi Lauper. He also won an Academy Award for the song "Purple Rain". In 1989, Irish singer Sinéad O'Connor recorded a cover of his song "Nothing Compares 2 U", which would become the biggest song of the year worldwide in the new decade to follow. Prince had four number-one singles and 14 top-ten hits on the Hot 100 Chart.

Lionel Richie teamed with Diana Ross to record one of the decade's biggest hits "Endless Love", which topped the Billboard charts for nine weeks. Other songs by Richie, such as "All Night Long" and "Hello" also topped the charts, and he would have a total of five number one hits and thirteen top ten singles. Diana Ross brought "Upside Down" to the top spot in 1980; she would have two number-one singles and eight top ten hits in the decade. Tina Turner topped the charts with "What's Love Got to Do with It" and scored a total of six top ten singles. Donna Summer's "She Works Hard for the Money" was a continuation of the feminist movement starting in the 70s and a rallying cry for those who worked hard and wanted to be treated fairly. She would have five top-ten singles in the decade.

Bruce Springsteen's Born in the U.S.A., AC/DC's Back in Black, Def Leppard's Hysteria, and Bon Jovi's Slippery When Wet were some of the decade's biggest-selling albums on the Billboard Top 200 chart.

During the mid-1980s American pop singer Cyndi Lauper was considered the "Voice of the MTV Generation of the '80s" and so different visual style that made the world for teens. Her first two albums She's So Unusual (1984) and True Colors (1986) were critically and commercially successful, spawning the hits, "Girls Just Want to Have Fun", "Time After Time", "She Bop", "All Through the Night", "The Goonies 'R' Good Enough", "True Colors" and "Change of Heart".

Richard Marx rose to fame in the late 80s and he is the only male artist in history to have his first seven singles reach the top 5 of the Billboard charts. He has scored a total of 14 number one singles, both as a performer and as a songwriter/producer. As a singer, his No. 1 hits include "Hazard", "Right Here Waiting", "Hold On to the Nights", "Endless Summer Nights", and "Satisfied". According to Billboard, Marx "holds the distinction of having written songs that have hit No. 1 on various Billboard charts in each of the last four decades."

Several British artists made the successful transition to pop during the 1980s and saw great commercial success, such as David Bowie, Phil Collins, John Lennon, Billy Ocean, Sheena Easton and Paul McCartney. Many British pop bands also dominated the American charts in the early 1980s. Many of them became popular due to their constant exposure on MTV, these bands included The Human League, Culture Club, Duran Duran, and Wham!. Between the four, they have had 9 U.S. number ones with hits like "Don't You Want Me", "Karma Chameleon", "The Reflex" and "Wake Me Up Before You Go-Go". In the later part of the decade, Rick Astley, George Michael as a solo artist, Terence Trent D'Arby, and Fine Young Cannibals all found chart success.

At the beginning of the 1980s, Australian artists like Olivia Newton-John, Men at Work, Air Supply, and AC/DC all had chart success, later in the decade INXS and Crowded House scored hits. Olivia Newton-John's hit "Physical" would top the Hot 100 for 10 weeks and be the decade's biggest hit in the US; she would have six top ten singles during the 80s.

Canadian artists such as Men Without Hats, Bryan Adams, and Corey Hart achieved huge success during the decade.

American artists such as Blondie, Christopher Cross, Steve Perry, Toni Basil, Michael Sembello, Matthew Wilder, Kim Carnes, Devo, Karla Bonoff, The Weather Girls, Ray Parker Jr., Billy Crystal, Eddie Money, Don Johnson, Bruce Willis, Bobby McFerrin, The B-52's, Charlene, Martika, Stevie B and Eddie Murphy also had at least one big hit.

American artists such as Michael Jackson, Whitney Houston, Madonna, Bruce Springsteen, Kenny Loggins, Kool & the Gang, The Pointer Sisters, Huey Lewis and the News, Billy Joel, Hall & Oates, Prince, The Go-Go's, Kenny Rogers and John Mellencamp, then known as John Cougar, ruled the charts throughout the decade in the US. Jackson, Houston, Prince, Madonna, Joel and Springsteen along with U2, Dire Straits, Phil Collins, The Police, Queen, The Rolling Stones and Eurythmics achieved tremendous success worldwide.

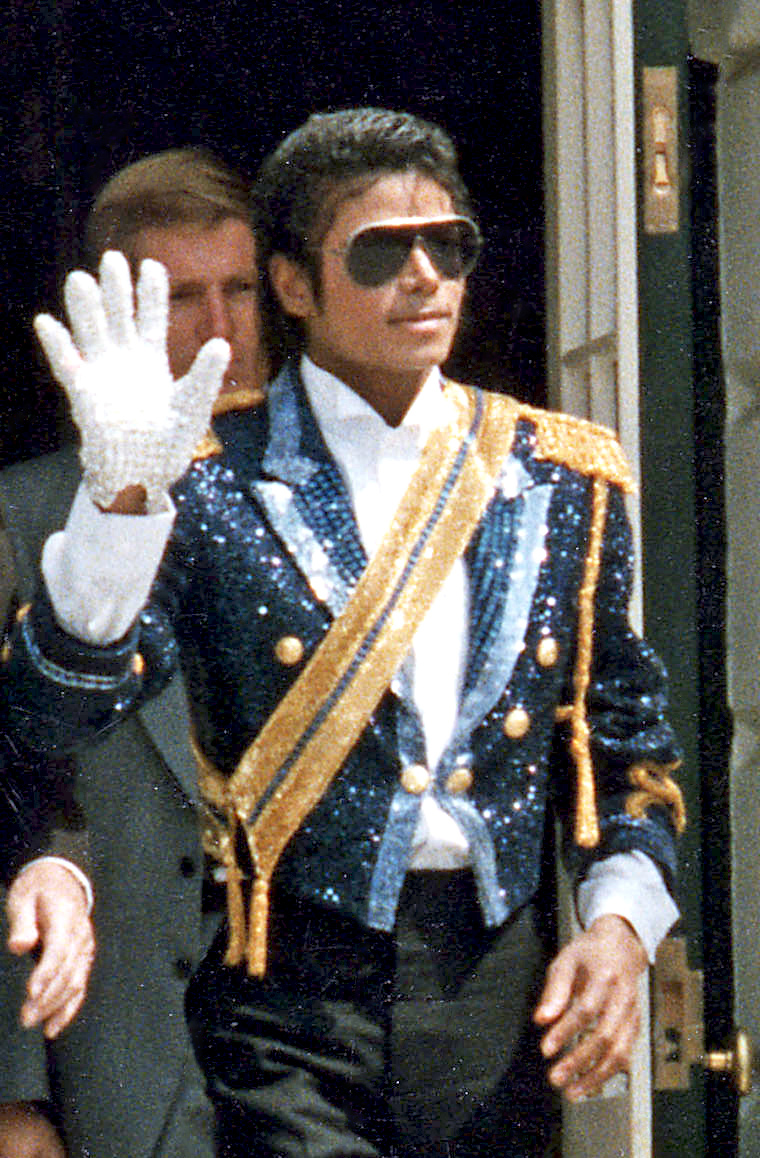
Michael Jackson is one of the most successful pop music artists in history and has been nicknamed the "King of Pop"

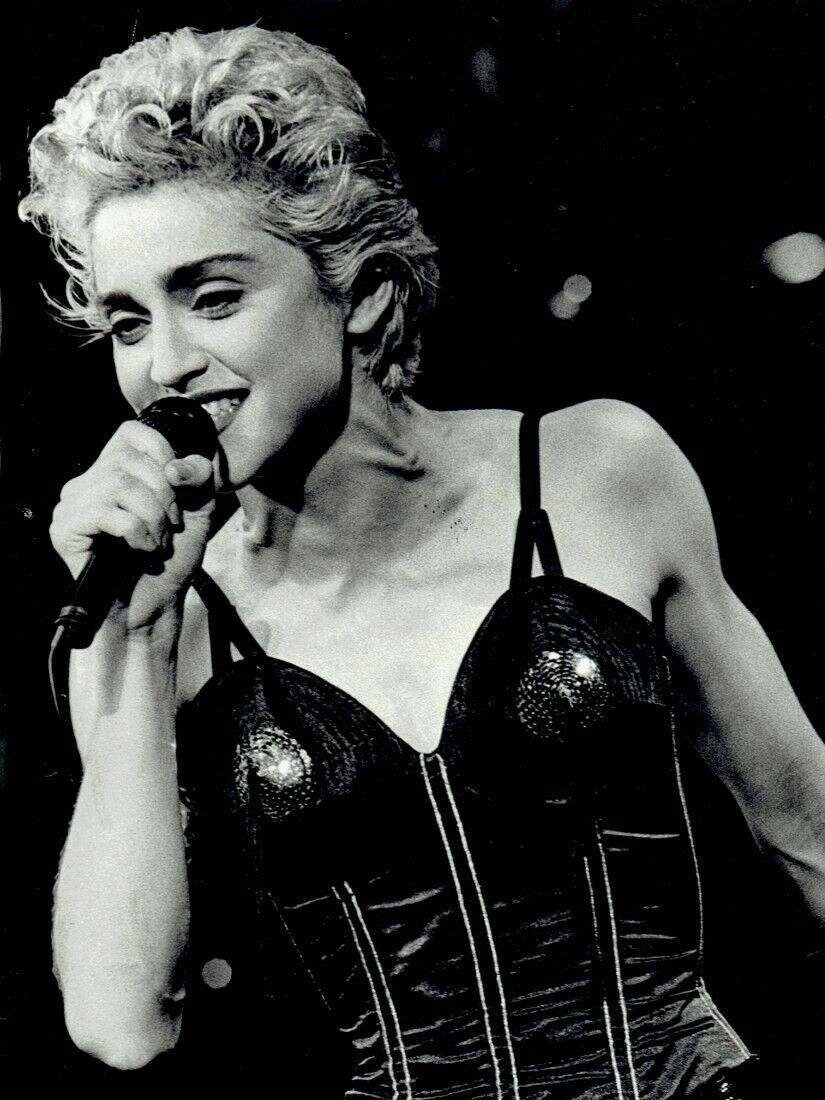
Madonna, nicknamed the "Queen of Pop", was the best-selling female pop music artist of the decade

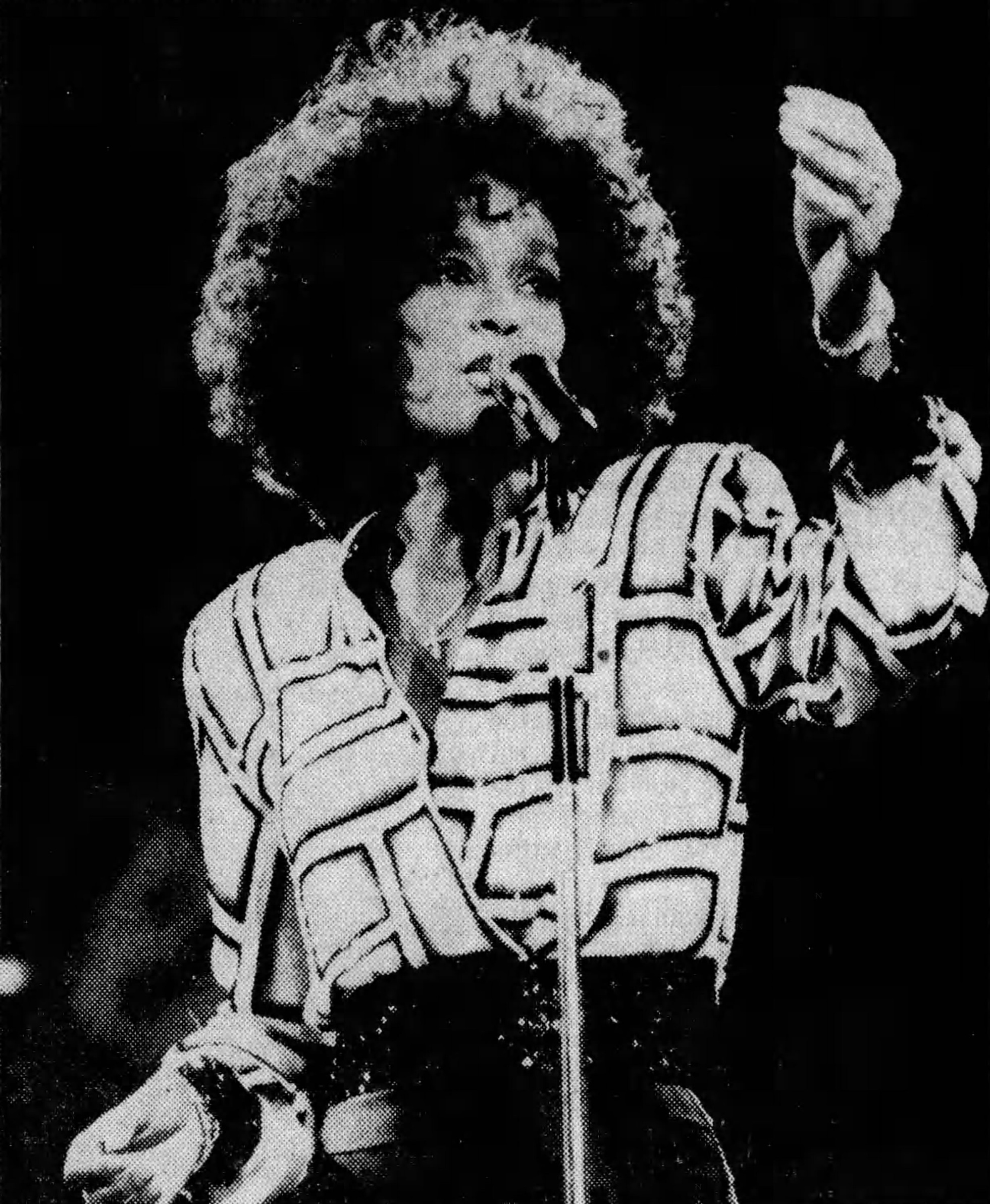
Whitney Houston, nicknamed "the Voice", is one of the biggest selling music artists of all time, with over 220 million records sold worldwide.

=== Rock ===
In the 1980s, rock music was more precisely defined and split up into multiple subgenres.

==== Hard rock and heavy/glam metal ====
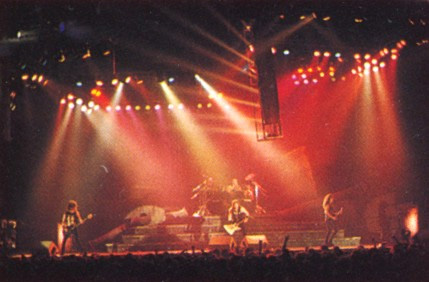
Metallica in concert, 1988

Beginning in 1983 and peaking in success in 1986-1992, the decade saw the resurgence of hard rock music and the emergence of its glam metal subgenre. Bands such as AC/DC, Queen, Chicago, Def Leppard, Kiss, Mötley Crüe, Bon Jovi, Quiet Riot, Scorpions, Europe, Ratt, Twisted Sister, Poison, Dokken, Whitesnake, and Cinderella were among the most popular acts of the decade. The 1980s saw the emergence of wildly popular hard rock band Guns N' Roses and the successful comebacks of Aerosmith and Alice Cooper in the late 1980s. The success of hard rock act Van Halen spanned throughout the entire decade, first with singer David Lee Roth and later with Sammy Hagar. Queen, which had expanded its music to experimental and crossover genres in the early 1980s, returned to guitar-driven hard rock with The Miracle in 1989. Additionally, a few women managed to achieve stardom in the 1980s hard rock scene, including: Pat Benatar, Ann and Nancy Wilson of Heart, and former Runaways members Joan Jett and Lita Ford.

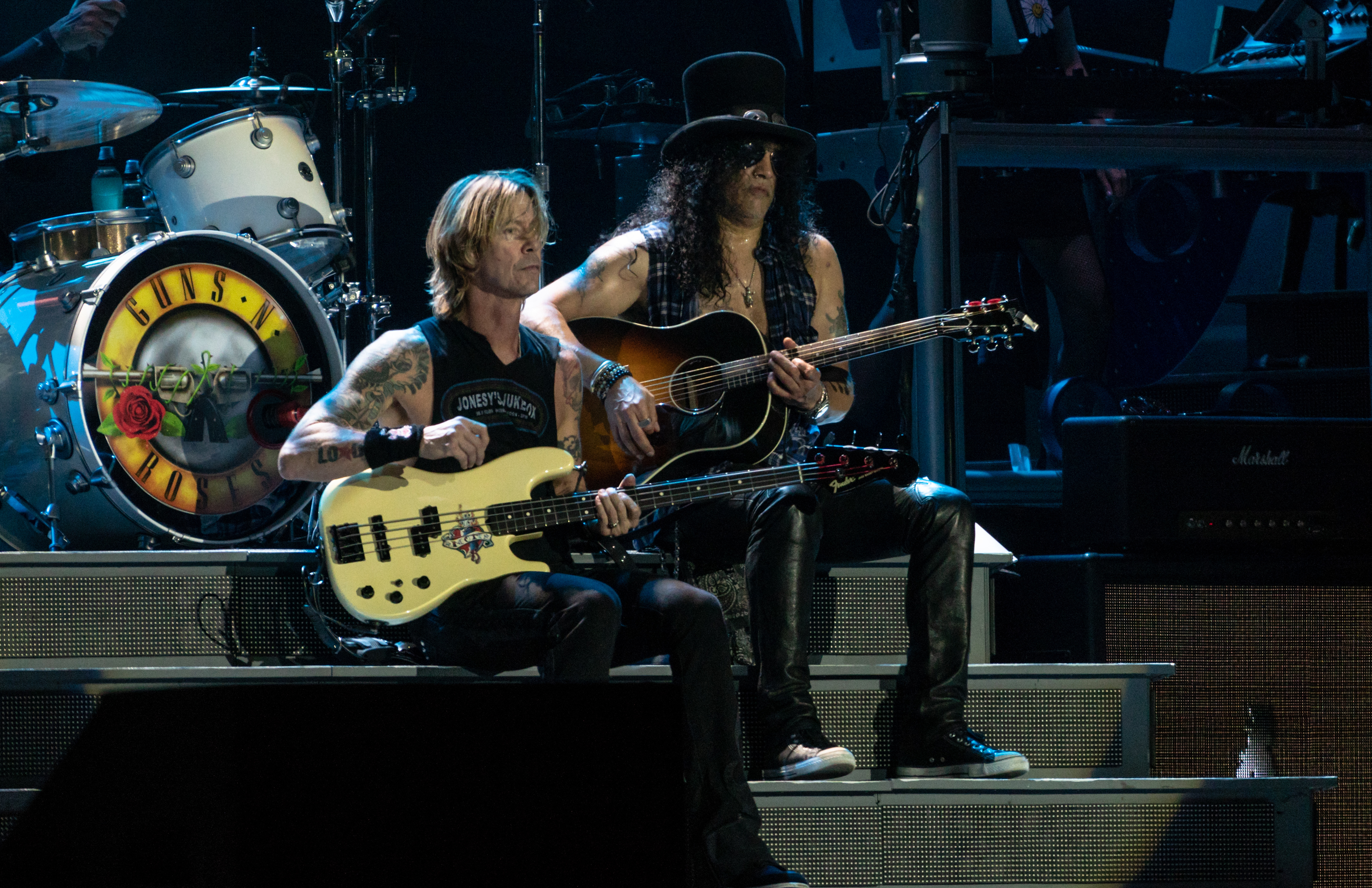
Duff McKagan and Slash of Guns N' Roses

The arena rock trend of the 1970s continued in the 1980s with bands like Styx, Rush, Journey, Foreigner, Starship, REO Speedwagon, Heart, ZZ Top, and Aerosmith.

Traditionally associated (and often confused) with hard rock, heavy metal was also extremely popular throughout the decade, with Ozzy Osbourne achieving success during his solo career; bands like Iron Maiden, Judas Priest and Dio were also widely popular British acts. Speed metal pioneer Motörhead maintained its popularity through the release of several albums. Underground scenes produced an array of more extreme, aggressive metal subgenres: thrash metal broke into the mainstream with numerous bands, including the genre's U.S. "Big Four" (Metallica, Slayer, Anthrax and Megadeth), as well as Exodus, Testament, Overkill, Brazil's Sepultura and Germany's "Big Teutonic Four": Kreator, Destruction, Sodom and Tankard. By the late 1980s, Metallica would achieve mainstream success and would become one of the best-selling music artists of all time. Other styles like power metal, death metal and black metal would remain a subcultural phenomena.

The decade also saw the emergence of a string of guitar virtuosi: Eddie Van Halen, George Lynch, Joe Satriani, Steve Vai, Randy Rhoads, Michael Schenker, Jason Becker and Yngwie Malmsteen achieved international recognition for their skills. While considerably less numerous, bass guitar virtuosi also gained momentum in the 1980s: Geddy Lee (of Rush), Billy Sheehan (of David Lee Roth and Mr. Big fame), Cliff Burton (of Metallica) and alternative/funk metal bassist Les Claypool (of Primus fame) became famous during that period. Iron Maiden founder and bassist Steve Harris has also been praised numerous times for his galloping style of bass playing.

Both hard rock and heavy metal were extremely popular live genres and bands toured extensively around the globe.

==== Alternative rock ====
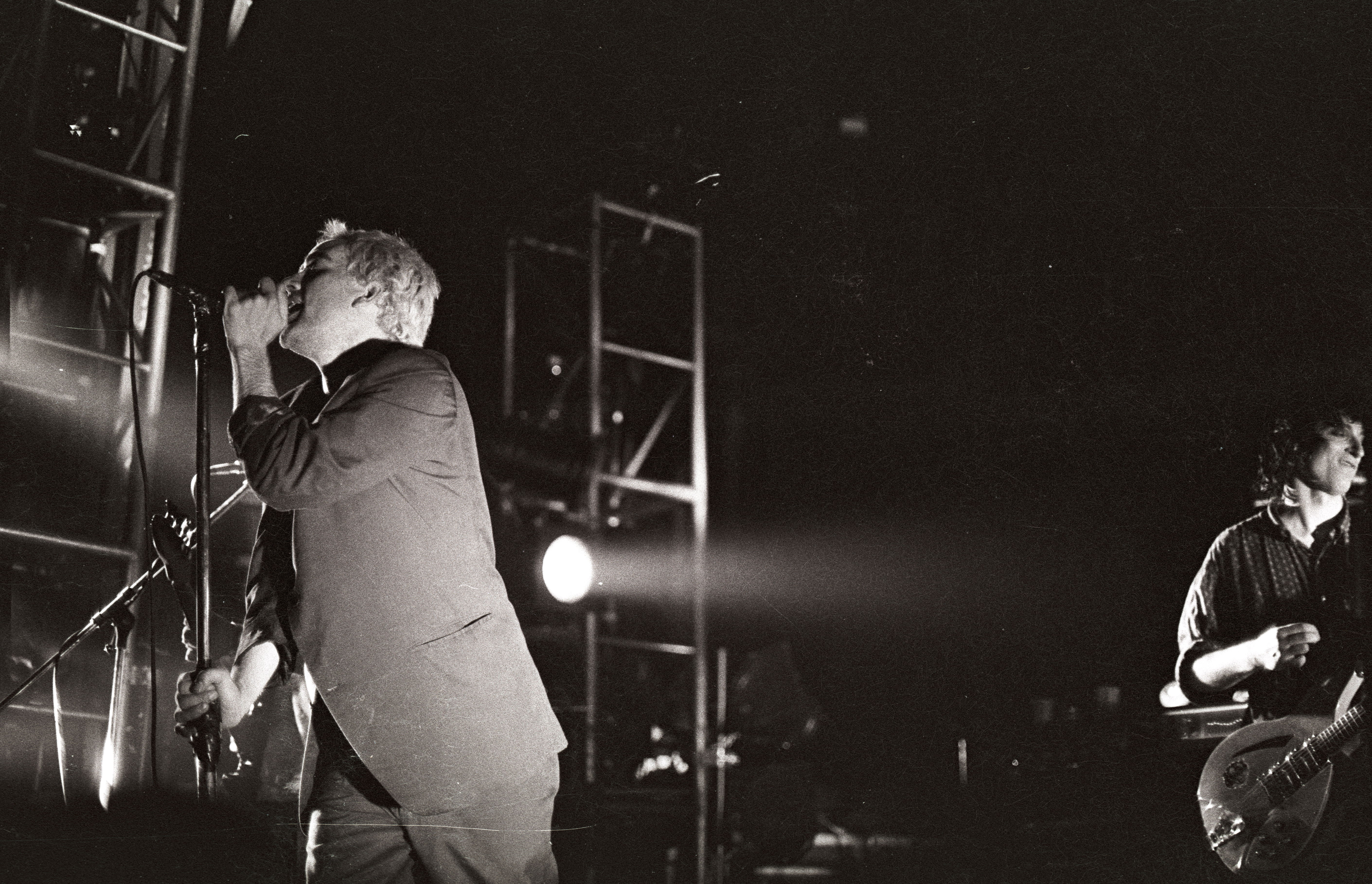
One of the first alternative rock bands, R.E.M. relied on college radio airplay, constant touring, and a grassroots fanbase to break into the musical mainstream.

By 1984, a majority of groups signed to independent record labels were mining from a variety of rock and particularly 1960s rock influences. This represented a sharp break from the futuristic, hyper-rational post-punk years.

Throughout the 1980s, alternative rock was mainly an underground phenomenon. While on occasion a song would become a commercial hit or albums would receive critical praise in mainstream publications like Rolling Stone, alternative rock in the 1980s was primarily relegated to independent record labels, fanzines and college radio stations. Alternative bands built underground followings by touring constantly and regularly releasing low-budget albums. In the case of the United States, new bands would form in the wake of previous bands, which created an extensive underground circuit in America, filled with different scenes in various parts of the country. Although American alternative artists of the 1980s never generated spectacular album sales, they exerted a considerable influence on later alternative musicians and laid the groundwork for their success.

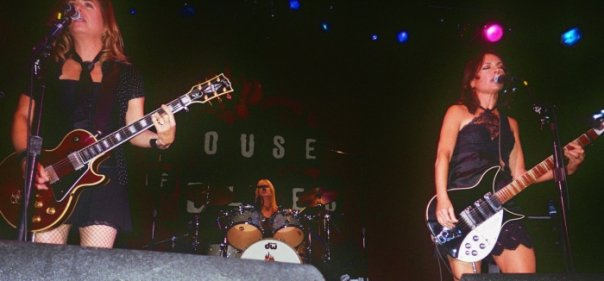
The Bangles performing at The House of Blues in Cleveland

Early American alternative bands such as R.E.M., The Hits, The Feelies, and Violent Femmes combined punk influences with folk music and mainstream music influences. R.E.M. was the most immediately successful; its debut album, Murmur (1983), entered the Top 40 and spawned a number of jangle pop followers. Alternative and indie pop movements sprang up in other parts of the world, from the Paisley Underground of Los Angeles (The Bangles, Rain Parade) to Scotland (Aztec Camera, Orange Juice), Australia (The Church, The Triffids), and New Zealand's Dunedin sound (The Clean, The Chills).

American indie record labels SST Records, Twin/Tone Records, Touch and Go Records, and Dischord Records presided over the shift from the hardcore punk that then dominated the American underground scene to the more diverse styles of alternative rock that were emerging. Minnesota bands Hüsker Dü and The Replacements were indicative of this shift. Both started as punk rock bands but soon diversified their sounds and became more melodic.

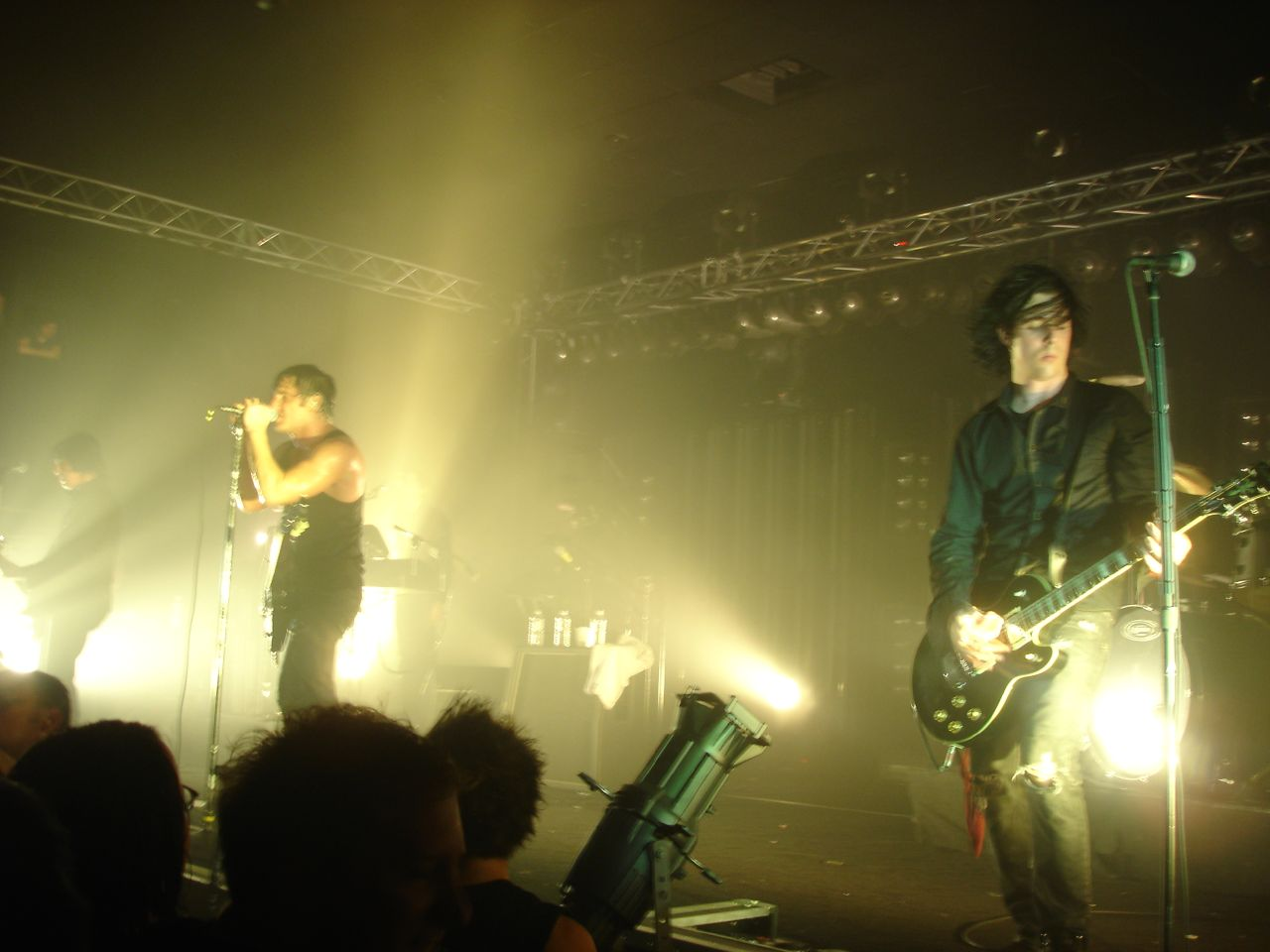
Nine Inch Nails

By the late 1980s, the American alternative scene was dominated by styles ranging from quirky alternative pop (They Might Be Giants and Camper Van Beethoven), to noise rock (Big Black, Swans) to industrial rock (Ministry, Nine Inch Nails) and to early grunge (Mudhoney, Nirvana). These sounds were in turn followed by the advent of Boston's the Pixies and Los Angeles' Jane's Addiction.

American alternative rock bands of the 1980s included Hüsker Dü, The Replacements, Minutemen, R.E.M., Dinosaur Jr., L7, Pixies, and Sonic Youth which were popular long before the grunge movement of the early 1990s.

New singers and songwriters included Michael Jackson, Bruce Springsteen, Tom Petty, Mark Heard, Lucinda Williams, Patti Smith, Rickie Lee Jones, Terence Trent D'Arby, Stevie Nicks, Suzanne Vega, Cheryl Wheeler and Warren Zevon. Rock and even punk rock artists such as Belinda Carlisle, Michael McDonald, Peter Case, Phil Collins and Paul Westerberg transitioned to careers as solo singers.

In the late 1980s, the term was applied to a group of predominantly female U.S. artists, beginning with Suzanne Vega whose first album sold unexpectedly well, followed by the likes of Tracy Chapman, Nanci Griffith, k.d. lang and Tori Amos, who found success first in the United Kingdom, then in her home market.

==== Other trends ====
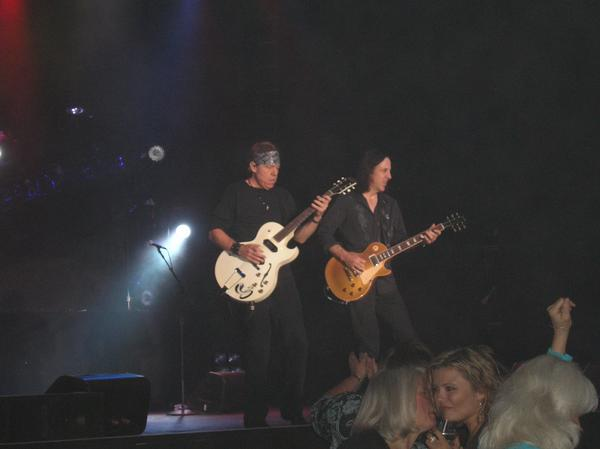
George Thorogood and Jim Suhler performing

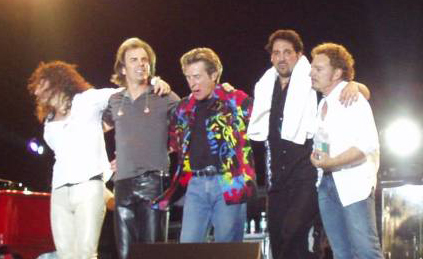
Journey

Various older rock bands made a comeback. Bands originating from the early to mid-1960s such as the Beach Boys and the Kinks had hits with "Kokomo" and "Come Dancing". Bands with popularity in the mid-1970s such as the Steve Miller Band and Steely Dan also had hits with "Abracadabra" and "Hey Nineteen". Singer and songwriter Bruce Springsteen released his blockbuster album Born in the U.S.A., which produced a record-tying 7 hit singles. Stevie Ray Vaughan and George Thorogood sparked a revival of blues rock. Massively successful hard rock band Led Zeppelin disbanded after drummer John Bonham's 1980 death, while contemporaries AC/DC continued to have success after the death of former frontman Bon Scott. Country rock saw a decline after Lynyrd Skynyrd's 1977 plane crash and the 1980 disbanding of the genre's most successful band, the Eagles. The Grateful Dead had their biggest hit in band history with "Touch of Grey". The Who produced the hit songs "You Better You Bet" and "Eminence Front" before burning out after the death of their drummer Keith Moon. Neil Diamond make a comeback with his 1981 hit song "America".

Hardcore punk flourished throughout the early to mid-1980s, with bands leading the genre such as Black Flag, Bad Brains, Minor Threat, Suicidal Tendencies, D.O.A., and Dead Kennedys amongst others. It began to wane in the latter half of the decade, with the New York hardcore scene dominating the genre. However, it experienced a jumpstart in the late 1980s with emerging bands such as Operation Ivy and Green Day that would define not just the so-called "East Bay" sound but impact the next decade's punk and alternative sound. Some of which are still around today.

The 1980s proved a difficult time for many 1960s-70s veterans, many of them unable or unwilling to adapt to current trends. Music icons such as Bob Dylan, Neil Young, and The Rolling Stones released albums that were often poor quality and critically panned as they attempted to grapple with the changing times. MTV in particular was a problem for many artists, as it put a premium on youthfulness, good looks, and showmanship. Artists who became strongly associated with disco music also fell from grace and were often banned from radio play.

=== Contemporary R&B ===
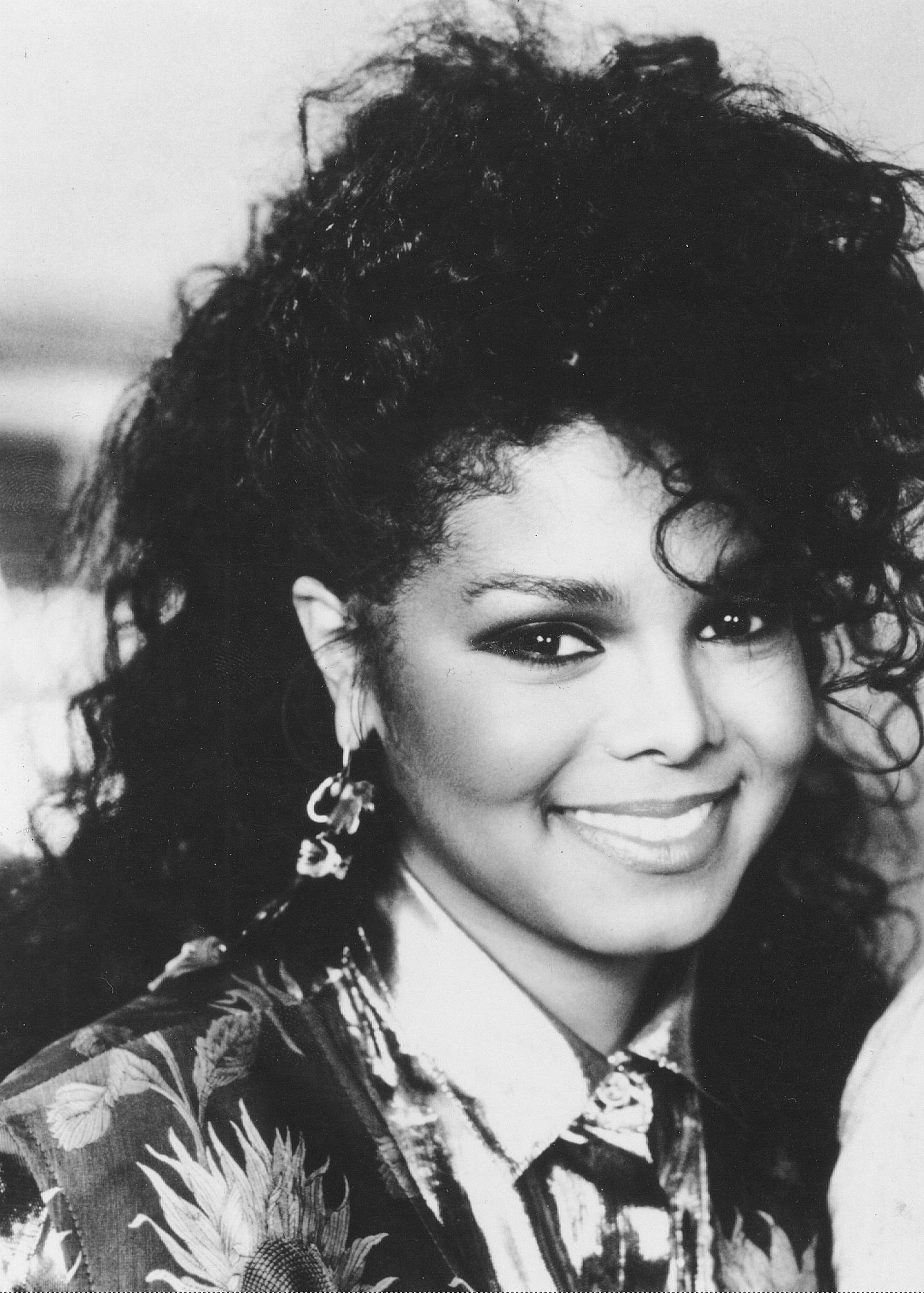
Janet Jackson

Contemporary R&B originated in the 1980s, when musicians started adding disco-like beats, high-tech production, and elements of hip hop, soul and funk to rhythm and blues, making it more danceable and modern. The top mainstream R&B artists of 1980s included Michael Jackson, Whitney Houston, Prince, Jermaine Jackson, James Ingram, The S.O.S. Band, Stevie Wonder, Kool & the Gang, Jeffrey Osborne, Al Jarreau, Carl Carlton, Imagination, Bill Withers, Smokey Robinson, Rick James, Diana Ross, Lionel Richie, James Brown, Earth, Wind & Fire, New Edition, Evelyn King, Patrice Rushen, Lipps Inc., Chaka Khan, Musical Youth, KC and the Sunshine Band, The Gap Band, The Brothers Johnson, Marvin Gaye, The Jets, George Benson, DeBarge, Midnight Star, Deniece Williams, Cheryl Lynn, Club Nouveau, Val Young, Frankie Smith, Linda Clifford, Grover Washington Jr., Stephanie Mills, Jody Watley, Rockwell, Babyface, Rene and Angela, The Whispers, and Freddie Jackson.

In the mid-1980s, many of the recordings by artists Luther Vandross, Freddie Jackson, Sade, Anita Baker, Teddy Pendergrass, Peabo Bryson and others became widely heard on the new quiet storm radio format. The term had originated with Smokey Robinson's 1975 album A Quiet Storm. Quiet storm has been described as "R&B's answer to soft rock and adult contemporary—while it was primarily intended for black audiences, quiet storm had the same understated dynamics, relaxed tempos and rhythms, and romantic sentiment."

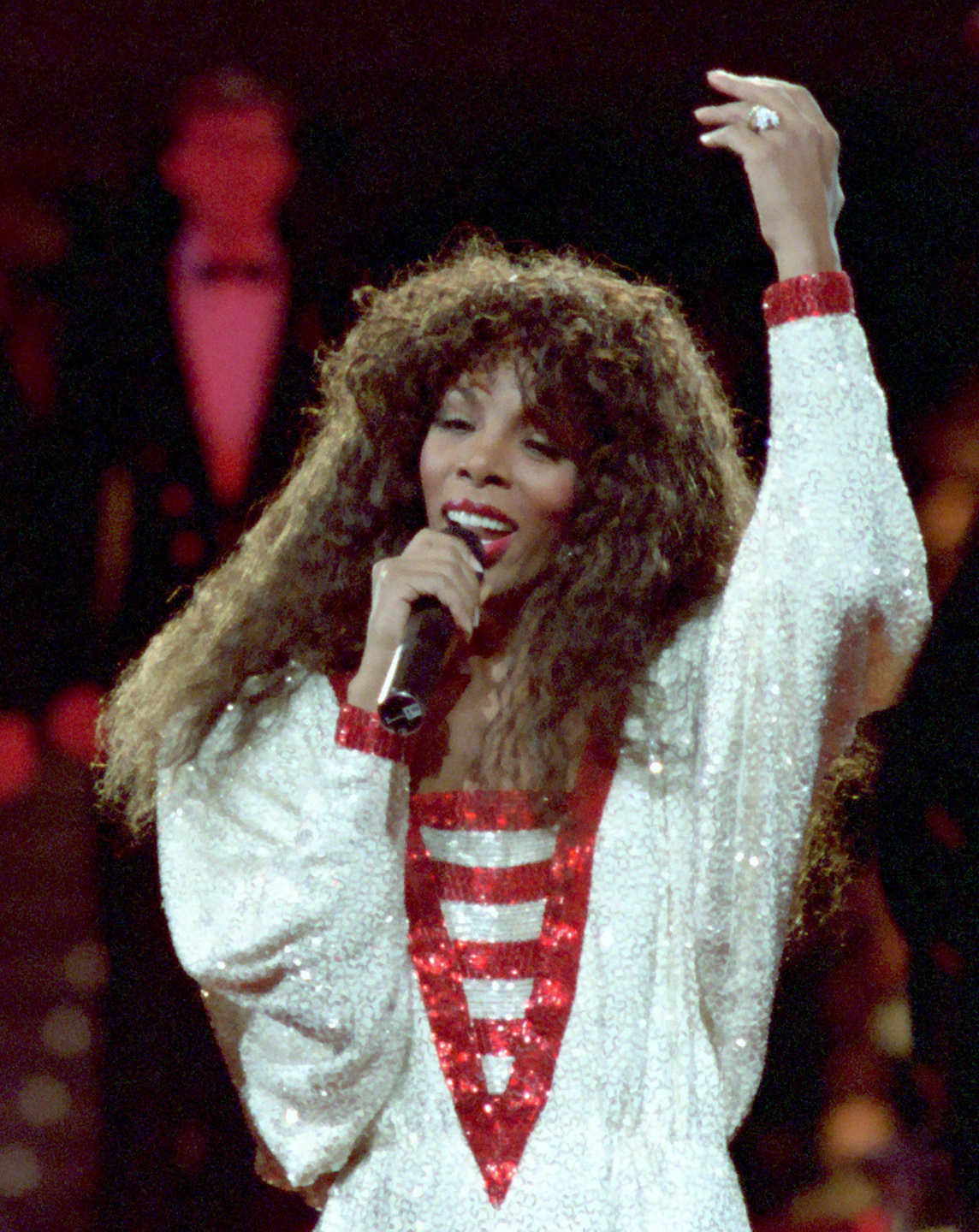
Donna Summer

Tina Turner made a huge comeback during the mid-1980s, while Donna Summer, Diana Ross, The Pointer Sisters and Irene Cara had success on the pop charts first half of the decade. Whitney Houston, Janet Jackson, and Jody Watley had it in the second half of the decade. Irene Cara's "Flashdance... What a Feeling" was the number one song worldwide in 1983, and for the decade of the 80s. Richard J. Ripani wrote that Janet Jackson's third studio album Control (1986) was "important to the development of R&B for several reasons", as she and her producers, Jimmy Jam and Terry Lewis, "crafted a new sound that fuses the rhythmic elements of funk and disco, along with heavy doses of synthesizers, percussion, sound effects, and a rap music sensibility". Ripani wrote that "the success of Control led to the incorporation of stylistic traits of rap over the next few years, and Janet Jackson was to continue to be one of the leaders in that development." That same year, Teddy Riley began producing R&B recordings that included hip hop influences. This combination of R&B style and hip hop rhythms was termed new jack swing, and was applied to artists such as Bobby Brown, Keith Sweat, Guy, Today, Wreckx-n-Effect, Big Daddy Kane, Kool Moe Dee, Heavy D & the Boyz, Tammy Lucas, Nayobe, Abstrac, Deja, Starpoint, and Bell Biv DeVoe.

Michael Jackson remained a prominent figure in the genre in the late 1980s, following the release of his album Bad (1987) which sold 6 million copies in the US in the 80s, and went on to sell more than 30 million copies worldwide. Janet Jackson's 1989 album Janet Jackson's Rhythm Nation 1814 continued the development of contemporary R&B into the 1990s, as the album's title track "Rhythm Nation" made "use of elements from across the R&B spectrum, including use of a sample loop, triplet swing, rapped vocal parts and blues notes." The release of Janet Jackson's Rhythm Nation 1814 became the only album in history to produce number one hits on the Billboard Charts Hot 100 in three separate calendar years—"Miss You Much" in 1989, "Escapade" and "Black Cat" in 1990, and "Love Will Never Do (Without You)" in 1991—and the only album in the history of the Hot 100 to have seven top 5 hit singles.

=== Hip hop ===
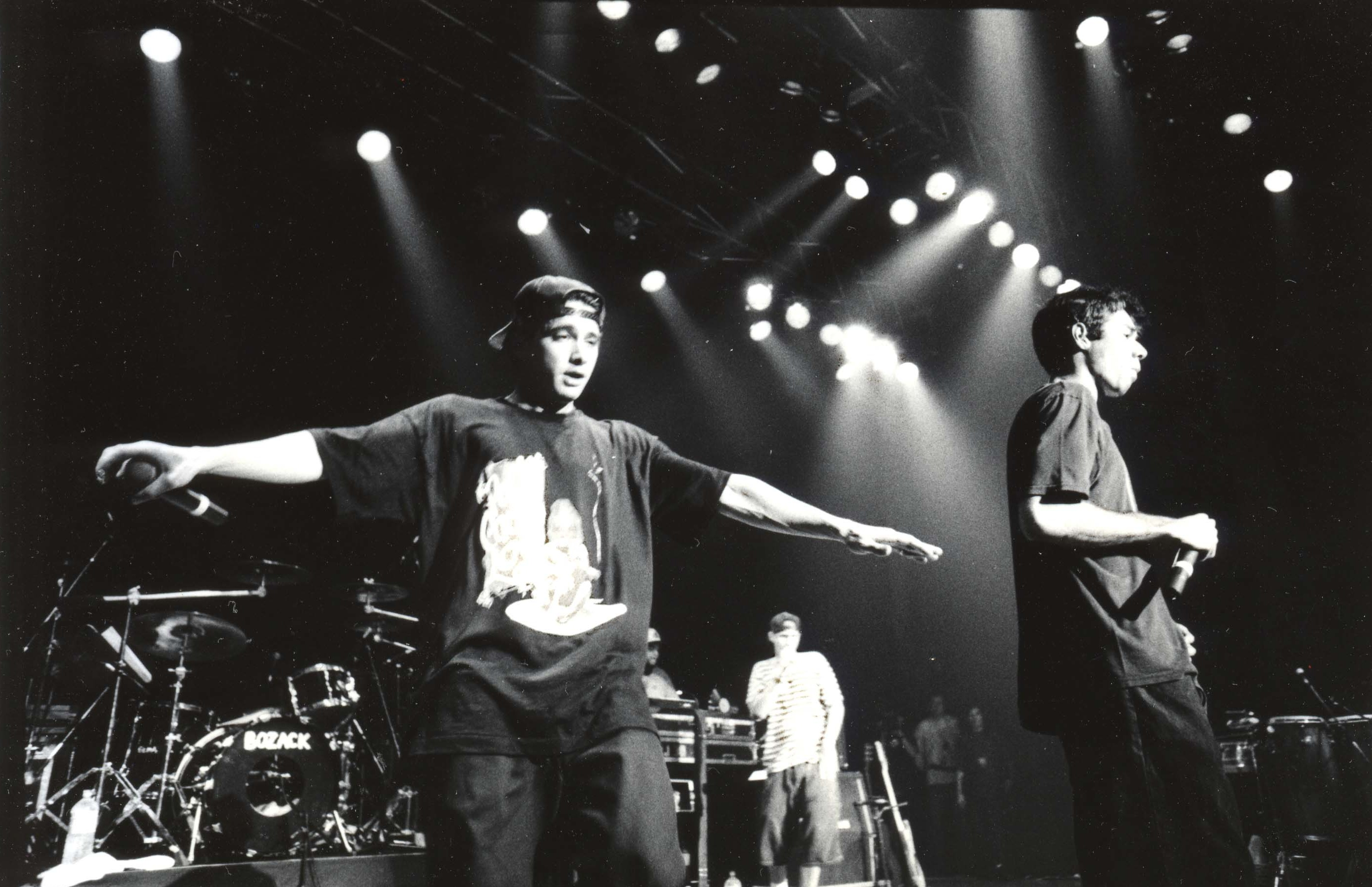
Beastie Boys in concert, 1992

Encompassing graffiti art, break dancing, rap music, and fashion, hip-hop became the dominant cultural movement of the African-American communities in the 1980s. The Hip hop musical genre had a strong influence on pop music in the late 1980s which continues to the present day.

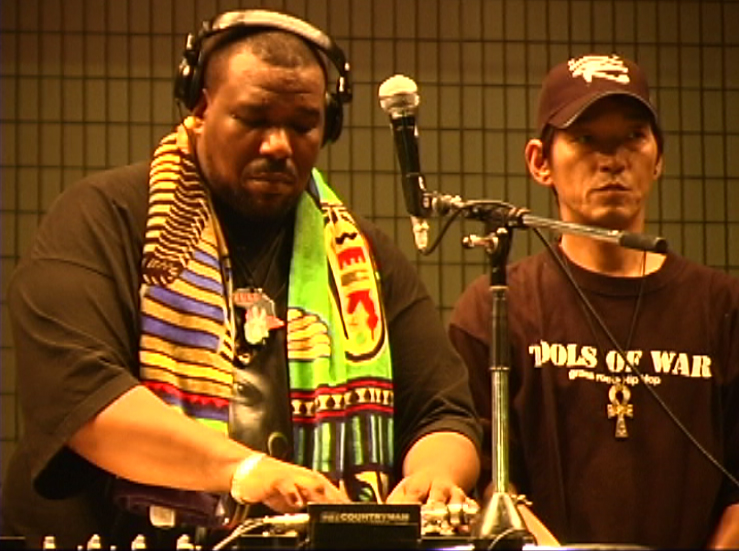
Afrika Bambaataa

During the 1980s, the hip-hop genre started embracing the creation of rhythm by using the human body, via the vocal percussion technique of beatboxing. Pioneers such as Africa Bambaataa, DJ Kool Herc, Melle Mel, Grandmaster Flash and the Furious Five, Whodini, Sugarhill Gang, Doug E. Fresh, Biz Markie and Buffy from the Fat Boys made beats, rhythm, and musical sounds using their mouth, lips, tongue, voice, and other body parts. "Human Beatbox" artists would also sing or imitate turntablism scratching or other instrument sounds.

The 1980s also saw many artists make social statements through hip-hop. In 1982, Melle Mel and Duke Bootee recorded "The Message" (officially credited to Grandmaster Flash and The Furious Five), a song that foreshadowed the socially conscious statements of Run-DMC's "It's Like That" and Public Enemy's "Black Steel in the Hour of Chaos".

Popular hip hop artists of the 1980s include Kurtis Blow, Run D.M.C., Beastie Boys, NWA, LL Cool J, Public Enemy, Eric B. & Rakim, Big Daddy Kane, Boogie Down Productions, Kid N Play, MC Lyte, EPMD, Salt N Pepa, and Ice-T, Schooly D, Slick Rick, Kool Moe Dee, Whodini, MC Hammer, among others.

=== Electronic ===
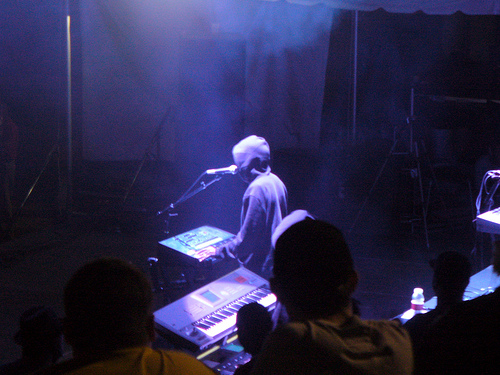
Model 500

In the 1980s, dance music records made using only electronic instruments became increasingly popular, largely influenced by the electronic music of Kraftwerk and 1970s disco music. Such music was originally born of and popularized via regional nightclub scenes in the 1980s and became the predominant type of music played in discothèques as well as the rave scene.

House music is a style of electronic dance music which originated in Chicago, Illinois, in the early 1980s. House music was strongly influenced by elements of soul- and funk-infused varieties of disco. Club play from pioneering DJs like Ron Hardy and Lil Louis, local dance music record shops, and the popular Hot Mix 5 shows on radio station WBMX-FM helped popularize house music in Chicago and among visiting DJs & producers from Detroit. Trax Records and DJ International Records, local labels with wider distribution, helped popularize house music outside of Chicago. It eventually reached Europe before becoming infused in mainstream pop and dance music worldwide during the 1990s.

It has been widely cited that the initial blueprint for techno was developed during the mid-1980s in Detroit, Michigan, by Juan Atkins, Kevin Saunderson, Derrick May (the so-called "Belleville Three"), and Eddie Fowlkes, all of whom attended school together at Belleville High, near Detroit. Though initially conceived as party music that was played on daily mixed radio programs and played at parties given by cliquish, Detroit high school clubs, it has grown to be a global phenomenon.

=== Country ===
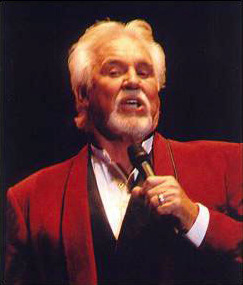
Kenny Rogers, 2004

As the 1980s dawned, pop-influenced country music was the dominant style, through such acts as Kenny Rogers, Ronnie Milsap, T.G. Sheppard, Eddie Rabbitt, Crystal Gayle, Anne Murray and Dolly Parton. The 1980 film Urban Cowboy, a romantic comedy starring John Travolta and Debra Winger, spawned a successful soundtrack album featuring pop-styled country songs, including "Lookin' for Love" by Johnny Lee, "The Devil Went Down to Georgia" by the Charlie Daniels Band, "Could I Have This Dance" by Murray and "Love the World Away" by Rogers. The songs, and the movie itself, resulted in an early 1980s boom in pop-style country music, and the era is sometimes known as the "Urban Cowboy Movement".

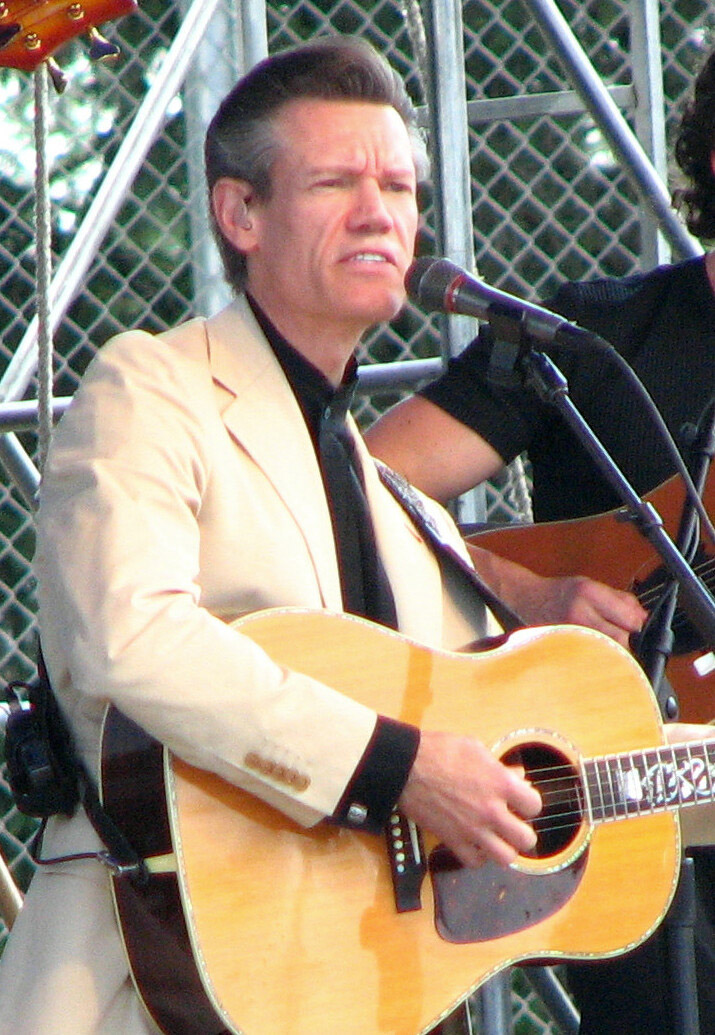
Randy Travis

By the mid-1980s, country music audiences were beginning to tire of country-pop. Although some pop-country artists continued to record and release successful songs and albums, the genre, in general, was beginning to suffer. By 1985, a New York Times article declared country music "dead". However, by this time, several newcomers were working behind the scenes to reverse this perception.

The year 1986 brought forth several new artists who performed in traditional country styles, such as honky-tonk. This sparked the "new traditionalist" movement, or a return to traditional country music. The most successful of these artists included Randy Travis, Dwight Yoakam, Ricky Van Shelton and Holly Dunn. Also, artists such as Kathy Mattea and Keith Whitley, both of whom had been performing for a few years prior, had their first major hits in 1986; Mattea was more folk-styled, while Whitley was pure honky-tonk. But the new traditionalist movement had already taken hold as early as 1981 when newcomers such as Ricky Skaggs and George Strait had their first big hits. Reba McEntire had her first big hit in 1980 followed by 15 other number-one hit singles during the decade. Also, songwriter–guitarist and Chet Atkins protégée Steve Wariner emerged as a popular act starting in the early 1980s.

Another boom period for newcomers with new traditionalist styles was in 1989, when artists such as Clint Black, Garth Brooks, Mary Chapin Carpenter, Lorrie Morgan, and Travis Tritt had their first big hits. It was Keith Whitley who was seen as being one of the torchbearers of the new traditionalist movement, due to his pure honky-tonk style in the vein of Lefty Frizzell and others. Whitley was a known heavy drinker, and alcohol poisoning ended his life in May 1989, just weeks after a song about triumph over personal demons – "I'm No Stranger to the Rain"—became a huge country hit. In keeping with the neotraditionalist movement, Dolly Parton, Linda Ronstadt and Emmylou Harris teamed up to release 1987's Platinum-selling Trio album. Composed mostly of traditional songs set to acoustic arrangements, the album won a Grammy in 1988 for best country collaboration.

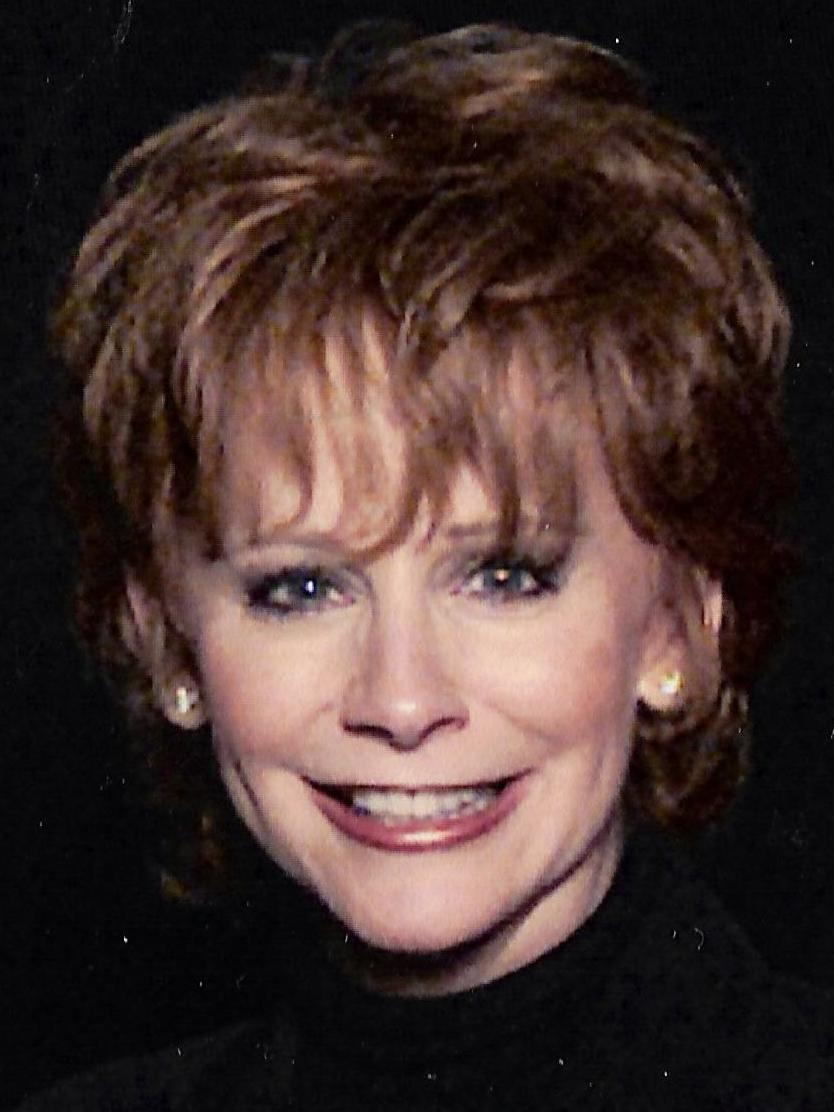
Reba McEntire

Vocal duos were also popular because of their harmonies, most notably The Bellamy Brothers and The Judds. Several of the Bellamy Brothers' songs included double-entendre' laden hooks, on songs such as "Do You Love as Good As You Look". The Judds, a mother-and-daughter duo, combined elements of contemporary pop and traditional country music on songs such as "Why Not Me" and "Grandpa (Tell Me 'Bout the Good Ol' Days)".

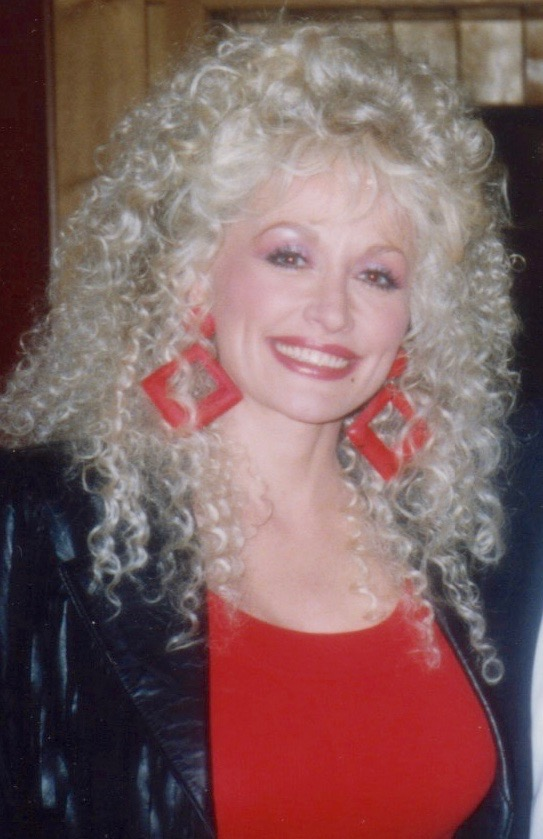
Dolly Parton

Country music groups and bands continued to rise in popularity during the 1980s. The most successful band was Alabama, a Fort Payne-based band that blended traditional and pop-country sounds with southern rock. Their concerts regularly sold out, while their single releases regularly reached No. 1 on the Billboard Hot Country Songs chart. Their mellow love ballad side would be most prominent in songs such as "Feels So Right," "When We Make Love," "There's No Way" and "If I Had You," while their southern rock influences and Southern pride were most evident on songs like "Tennessee River," "Dixieland Delight" and "Song Of the South." In 1989, Alabama was named the Artist of the Decade by the Academy of Country Music. By the end of the 1980s, the group had sold more than 24 million albums in the United States.

Ranking just behind Alabama in popularity, as far as groups were concerned, were The Oak Ridge Boys and The Statler Brothers, both four-part harmony groups with gospel and country-pop stylings. The Oak Ridge Boys found their biggest successes with songs like "Elvira," "Bobbie Sue" and "American Made." The Statlers began the decade with tenor singer Lew DeWitt, but health issues forced his retirement, and he'd be succeeded by Jimmy Fortune; with Fortune, the Statlers had three No. 1 hits, the biggest of which was "Elizabeth." The popularity of those three groups sparked a boom in new groups and bands, and by the end of the 1980s, fans were listening to such acts as Restless Heart and Exile, the latter which previously enjoyed success with the pop hit "Kiss You All Over".

Despite the prevailing pop-country sound, enduring acts from the 1970s and earlier continued to enjoy great success with fans. George Jones, one of the longest-running acts of the time, recorded several successful singles, including "He Stopped Loving Her Today". Conway Twitty continued to have a series of No. 1 hits, with 1986's "Desperado Love" becoming his 40th chart-topper on the Billboard Hot Country Singles chart, a record that stood for nearly 20 years. The film Coal Miner's Daughter profiled the life of Loretta Lynn (with Sissy Spacek in the lead role), while Willie Nelson also had a series of acting credits. Dolly Parton had much success in the 1980s, with several leading film roles, two No. 1 albums and 13 number-one hits, and many successful tours; she also teamed up with Emmylou Harris and Linda Ronstadt in 1987 for the multi-platinum Trio album. Others who had been around for a while and continued to have success were Eddy Arnold, Johnny Cash, Merle Haggard, Waylon Jennings, Ray Price, Hank Williams Jr. and Tammy Wynette.

In 1981, Jim Reeves and Patsy Cline, two artists who died in the 1960s (both in plane crashes), re-emerged in the spotlight when producer Bob Ferguson electronically created the "duet" "Have You Ever Been Lonely (Have You Ever Been Blue)." Neither Reeves nor Cline recorded together during their lifetimes but both recorded some of the same songs, and it was the style of "Have You Ever Been Lonely" that was the most conducive to a duet. The song was a top-5 success on the country chart in early 1982.

In addition to newcomer Whitley, top classic country and influential performers who died during the decade included Red Sovine, Whitey Ford, Marty Robbins, Merle Travis, Ernest Tubb, Wynn Stewart and Tex Williams. Although not directly associated with country music, Roy Orbison, a popular performer with many country music fans and whose styles wound up being influential with many newcomers, died in 1988.

== Europe ==
=== Rock ===
==== Post-punk ====
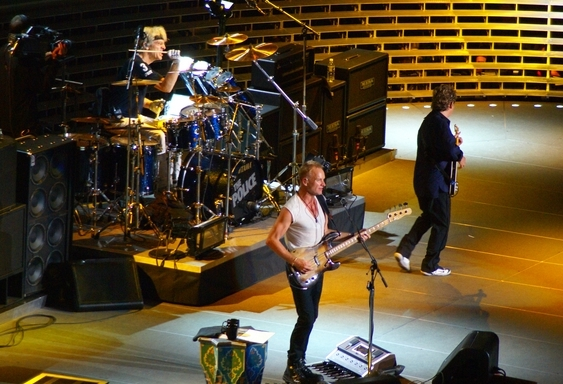
The Police, regarded by Rolling Stone as "possibly the biggest band in the world", November 1983.

Some of the most successful post-punk bands at the beginning of the decade, such as Siouxsie and the Banshees and the Psychedelic Furs, also continued their success during the 1980s. Members of Bauhaus and Joy Division explored new stylistic territory as Love and Rockets and New Order respectively.

The second generation of British post-punk bands that broke through in the early 1980s, including the Smiths, the Jesus and Mary Chain, the Cure, the Fall, the Pop Group, the Mekons, Echo and the Bunnymen and Teardrop Explodes, tended to move away from dark sonic landscapes.

Even though the Police's first hit song "Roxanne" was written by Sting in 1978 (reaching number 12 in the UK Charts that year), the song continued to grow in popularity in the 1980s along with the band. Even though The Police had their roots in post-punk, their eventual success (four consecutive UK number-one studio albums) and mega-stardom came from being able to pack the biggest stadium rock venues such as Wembley, the Oakland Coliseum and the Maracanã in Rio de Janeiro. Aside from U2, they are the only other band with post-punk origins to go on and achieve the kind of global success they did. Ireland's U2 incorporated elements of religious imagery together with political commentary into their often anthemic music, and by the late 1980s had become one of the biggest bands in the world.

Although many post-punk bands continued to record and perform, it declined as a movement in the mid-1980s as acts disbanded or moved off to explore other musical areas, but it has continued to influence the development of rock music and has been seen as a major element in the creation of the alternative rock movement.

==== New wave ====
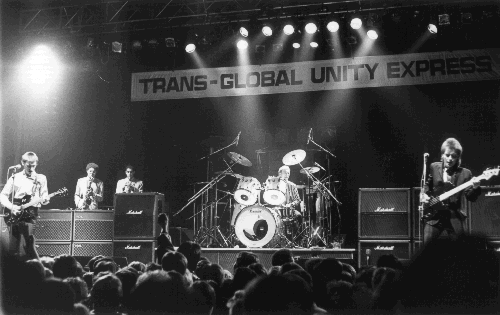
British new wave band The Jam in 1982

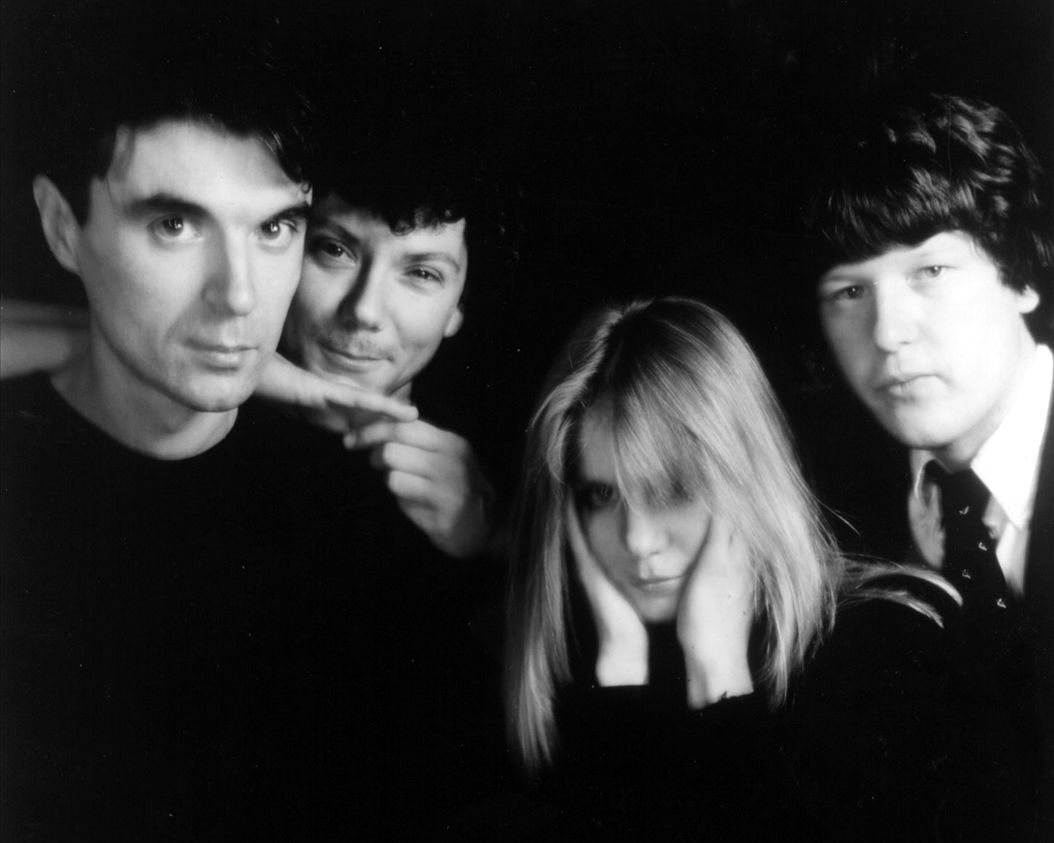
American new wave band Talking Heads in 1980

==== New Romantics ====
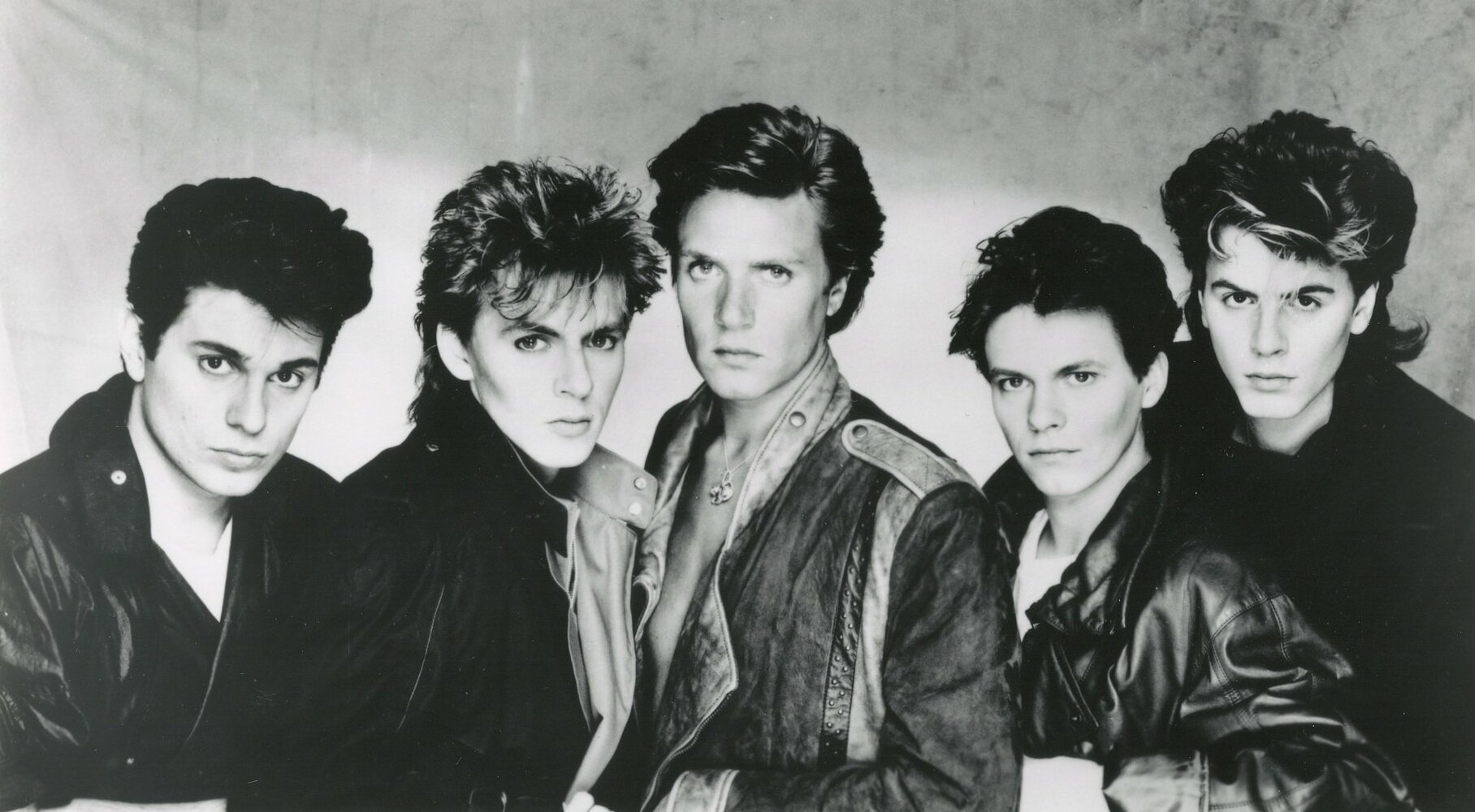
Duran Duran, circa 1983

The New Romantics emerged from London nightclubs including Billy's and The Blitz Club towards the end of the 1970s, gaining popularity in the early 1980s at the expense of new wave music. Influenced by David Bowie and Roxy Music, it developed glam rock fashions, gaining its name from the frilly fop shirts of early Romanticism. New Romantic music often made extensive use of synthesisers. Pioneers included Visage and Ultravox and among the commercially most successful acts associated with the movement were Culture Club, Spandau Ballet and Duran Duran. By about 1983, the original movement had dissolved, with surviving acts dropping most of the fashion elements to pursue mainstream careers. Other New Romantic artists included Classix Nouveaux, A Flock of Seagulls, Gary Numan, Japan, Landscape, Thompson Twins, Soft Cell, ABC, the Teardrop Explodes, Yazoo and Talk Talk.

==== Gothic rock ====
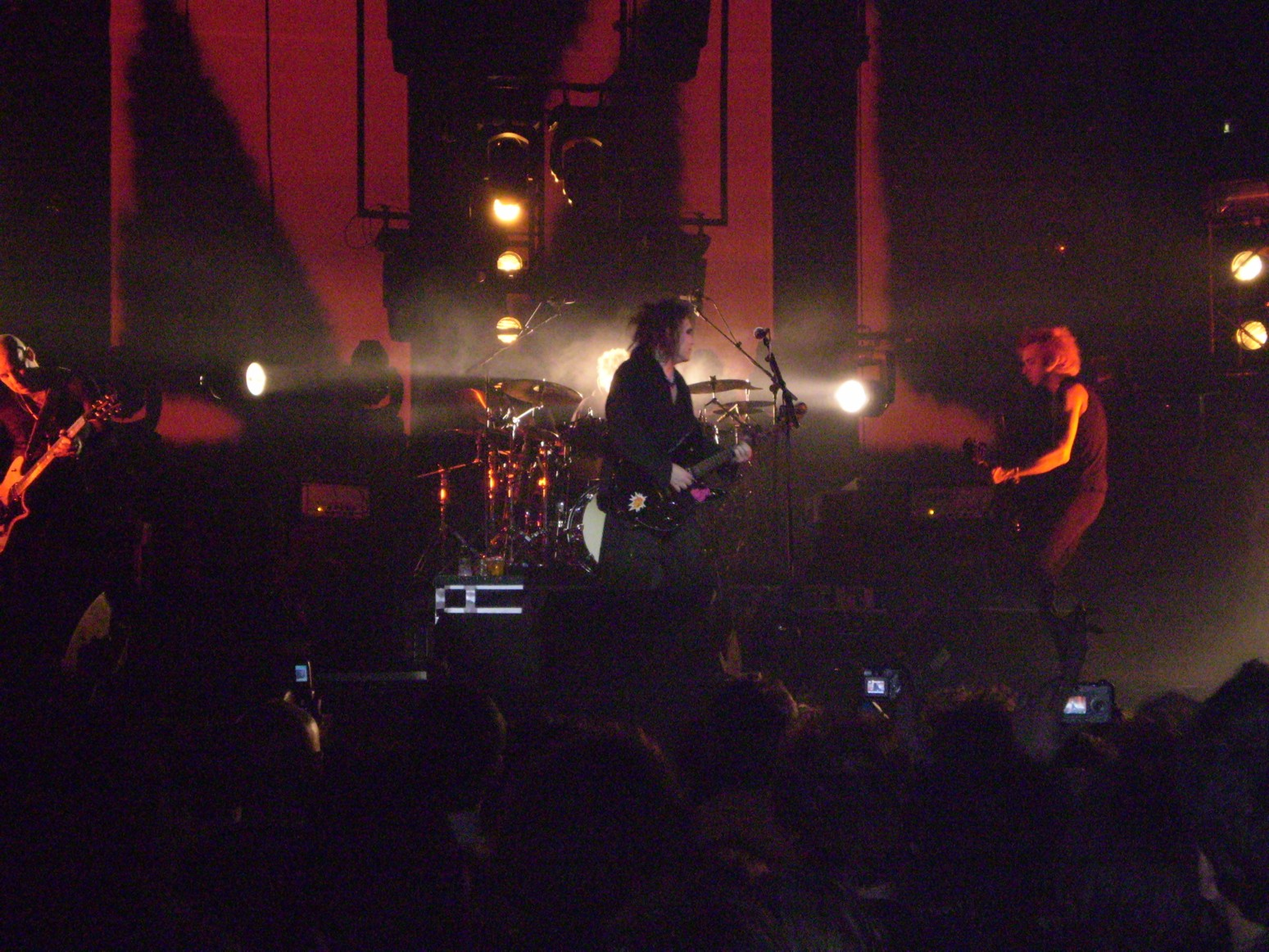
The Cure on stage, 2008

Gothic rock music developed out of the post-punk scene in the later 1970s. Notable early gothic rock bands include Bauhaus (whose "Bela Lugosi's Dead" is often cited as the first goth record), Siouxsie and the Banshees, The Cure, The Sisters of Mercy, and Fields of the Nephilim. Gothic rock gave rise to a broader goth subculture that included clubs, various fashion trends and numerous publications that grew in popularity in the 1980s, gaining notoriety by being associated by several moral panics over suicide and Satanism.

==== Heavy metal ====
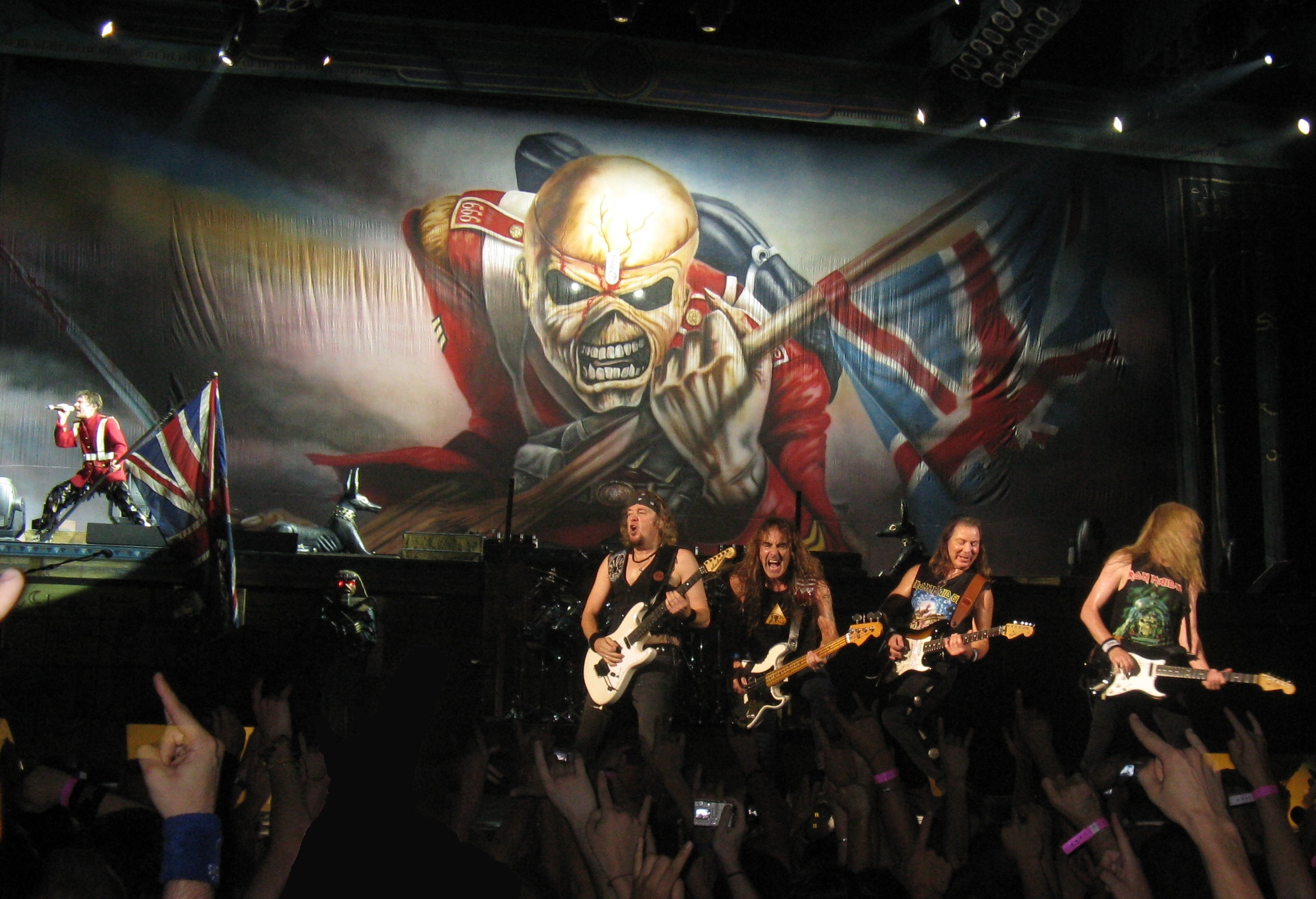
Iron Maiden, pioneers of the new wave of British heavy metal

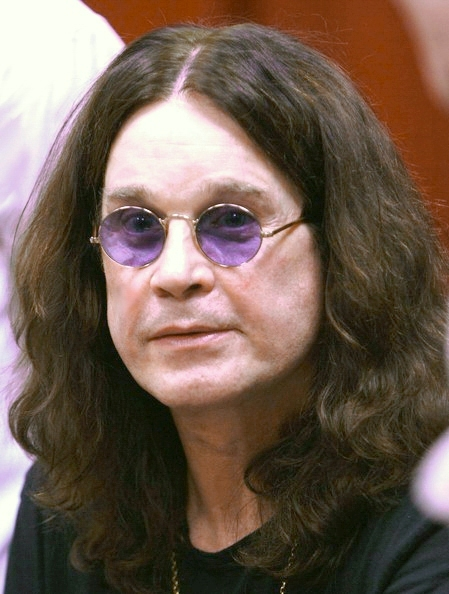
Ozzy Osbourne

In the early 1980s, the new wave of British heavy metal broke into the mainstream, as albums by Judas Priest, Iron Maiden, Saxon and Motörhead, reached the British top 10. In 1981, Motörhead became the first of this new breed of metal bands to top the UK charts with No Sleep 'til Hammersmith. After a string of UK top 10 albums, Whitesnake's 1987 self-titled album was their most commercially successful, with hits, "Here I Go Again" and "Is This Love", earning them a nomination for the Brit Award for Best British Group. Many metal artists, including Def Leppard, benefited from the exposure they received on ATV and became the inspiration for American glam metal. However, as the subgenre fragmented, much of the creative impetus shifted towards America and continental Europe (particularly Germany and Scandinavia), which produced most of the major new subgenres of metal, which were then taken up by British acts. These included thrash metal and death metal, both developed in the UK; black metal and power metal, both developed in continental Europe, but influenced by the British band Venom; and doom, which was developed in the US, but which soon were adopted by many bands from England, including Pagan Altar and Witchfinder General.

=== Pop ===
Phil Collins had three UK number-one singles in the 80s, seven US number-one singles, another with Genesis, and when his work with Genesis, his work with other artists, as well as his solo career is totalled, Collins had more top 40 hits on the Billboard Hot 100 chart during the 1980s than any other artist. His former Genesis colleague, Peter Gabriel, also had a very successful solo career, which included a US number-one single and three top ten UK hits (including a duet with Kate Bush). Genesis guitarist Mike Rutherford also enjoyed several UK and US hits with his project Mike + The Mechanics, which included a US number-one single. David Bowie saw much greater commercial success in the 1980s than he had in the previous decade, scoring four UK number-one singles, including "Let's Dance" which proved to be his biggest ever hit. He had a total of ten UK top ten hits during the decade, two in collaboration with other artists.

Boy George and his band Culture Club had great success in both the UK and US charts with major hits like "Do You Really Want to Hurt Me", "Time (Clock of the Heart)" and "Karma Chameleon". As well as Boy George having his own UK number one with his cover of Bread's "Everything I Own", he is considered a major icon of this era. Liverpool band Frankie Goes to Hollywood's initially controversial dance-pop gave them three consecutive UK number ones in 1984, until they faded away in the mid-1980s. Dead or Alive, also from Liverpool, was another popular dance-pop band in the mid-1980s. It was fronted by lead singer Pete Burns. Probably the most successful British pop band of the era was the duo Wham! with an unusual mix of disco, soul, ballads, and even rap, who had eleven top ten hits in the UK, six of them number ones, between 1982 and 1986. George Michael released his debut solo album, Faith in 1987, and would go on to have seven UK number-one singles. The 1985 concert Live Aid held at Wembley Stadium would see some of the biggest British artists of the era perform, with Queen widely regarded as stealing the show.

Bonnie Tyler had major hits with "Total Eclipse of the Heart" and "Holding Out for a Hero", while Robert Palmer's had two iconic music videos for "Addicted to Love" and "Simply Irresistible". The Bee Gees 1987 single "You Win Again" reached number one, making them the first group to score a UK #1 hit in each of three decades: the 1960s, '70s, and '80s. Other British artists who achieved success in the pop charts in the 80s included Paul McCartney, Elton John, Culture Club, John Waite, Kim Wilde, The Fixx, Joe Cocker, Rod Stewart, Kate Bush, Billy Idol, Rupert Holmes, Aneka, Mel and Kim, Eddy Grant, Paul Young, Steve Winwood, Elvis Costello, Simple Minds, Billy Ocean, Tears for Fears, UB40, Rick Astley, John Parr, Madness and Sade.

In 1988, Irish singer Enya achieved a breakthrough in her career with the album Watermark which sold over eleven million copies worldwide and helped launch Enya's successful career as a leading new-age, Celtic, World singer. Dutch band Tambourine received some notoriety in The Netherlands and Belgium toward the end of the decade.

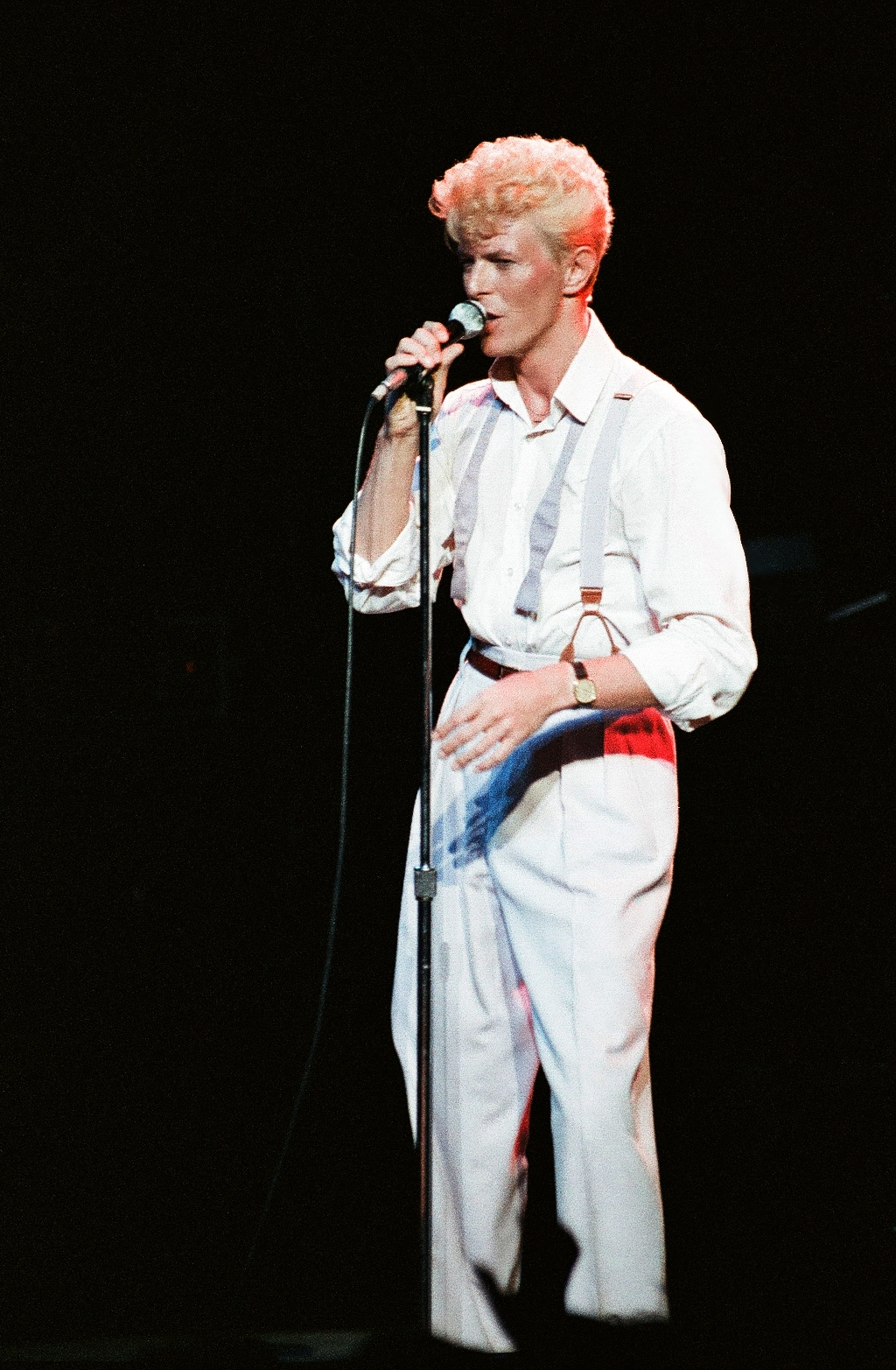
David Bowie saw commercial success during the early 1980s.

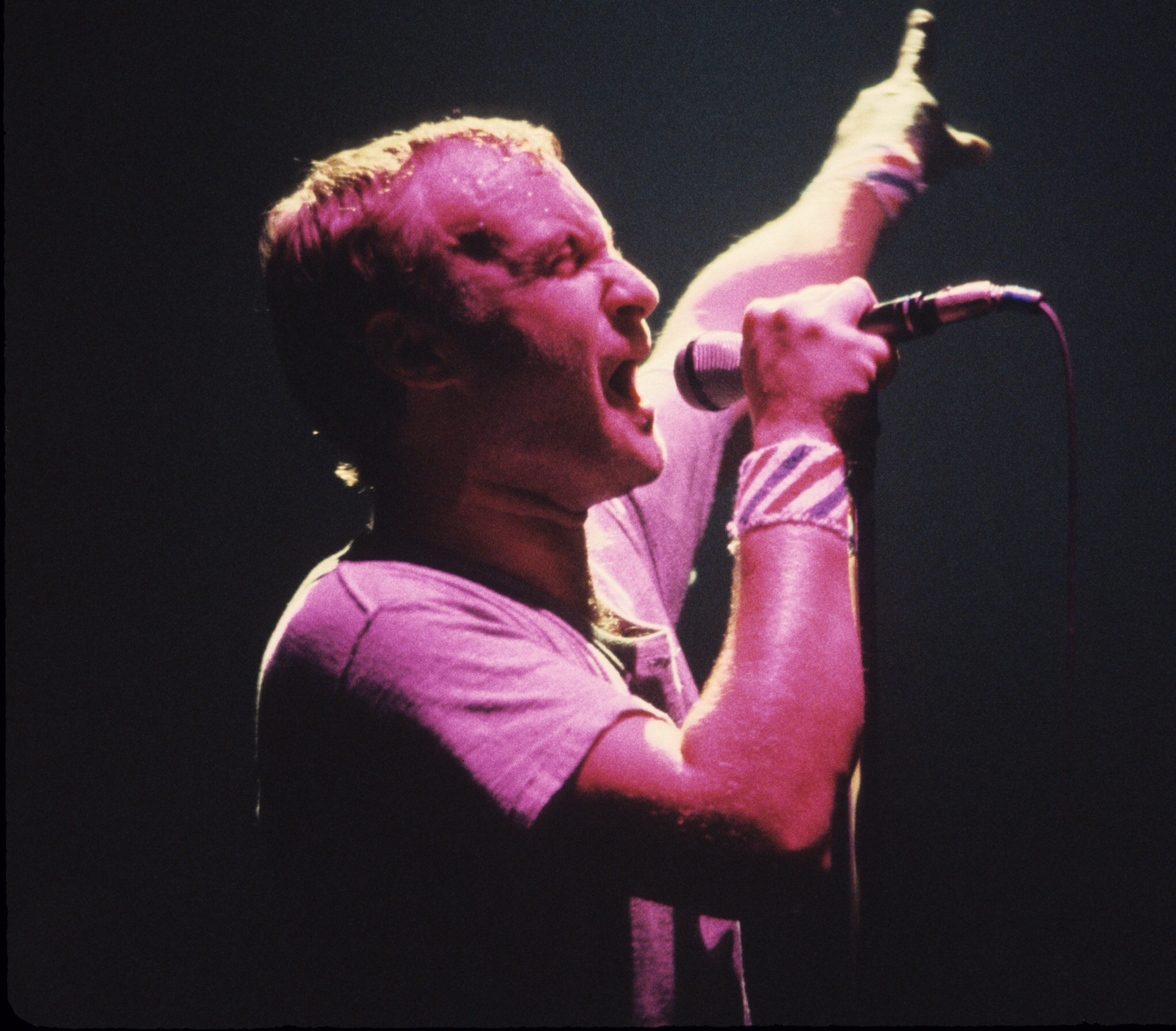
Phil Collins had more top 40 hits on the Billboard Hot 100 chart during the 1980s

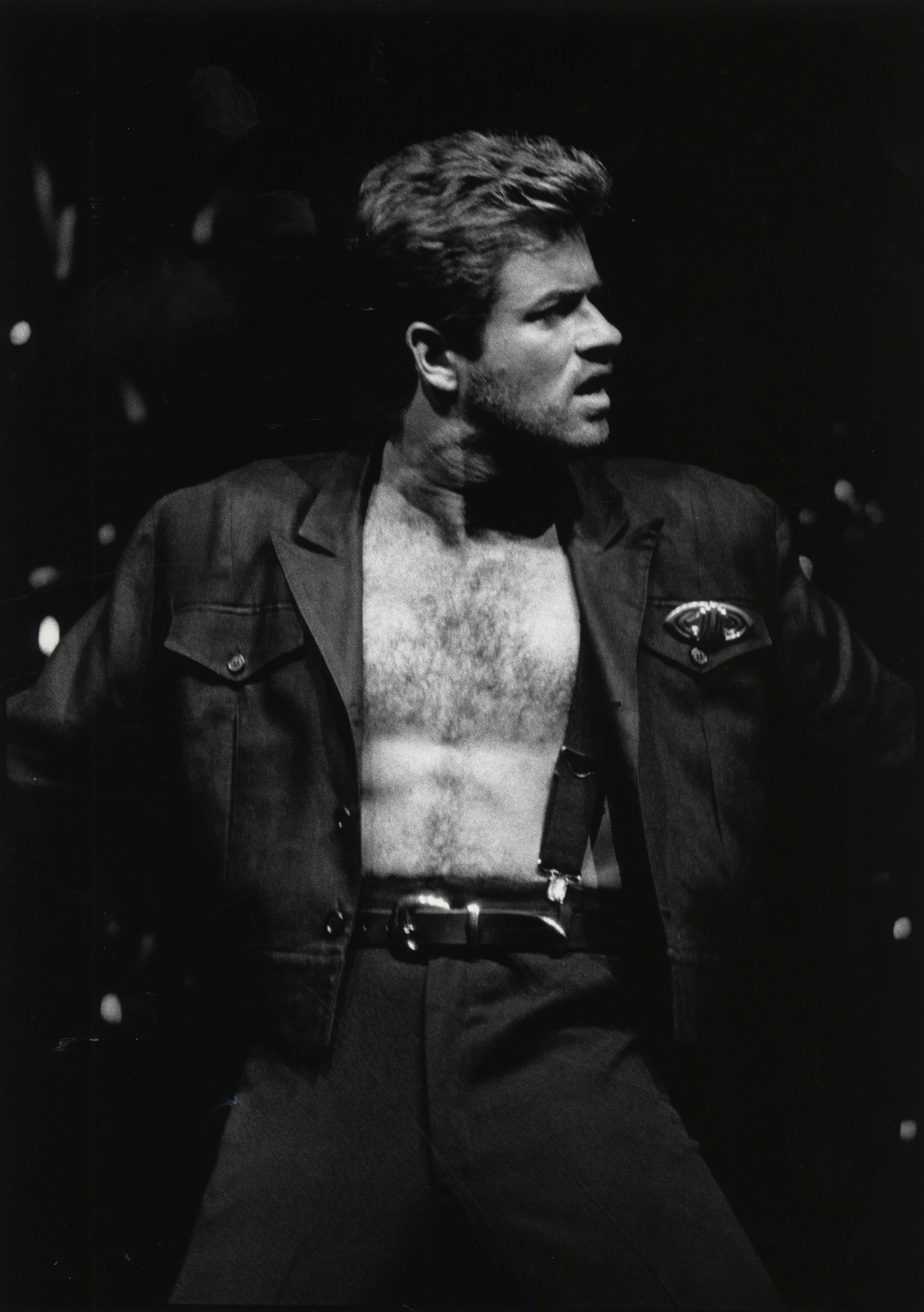
George Michael was the most successful British pop artist of the 1980s. His debut solo album Faith (1987) is one of the best-selling albums of all time, with sales of over 25 million copies.

==== Synthpop ====
Synthpop emerged from new wave, producing a form of pop music that followed electronic rock pioneers in the 1970s like Kraftwerk, Jean Michel Jarre, and Tangerine Dream, in which the synthesizer is the dominant musical instrument. The sounds of synthesizers came to dominate the pop music of the early 1980s as well as replacing disco in dance clubs in Europe.

Other successful synthpop artists of this era included Pet Shop Boys, Alphaville, Soft Cell, Depeche Mode, New Order, Gary Numan, The Human League, Thomas Dolby, Howard Jones, Yazoo, Art of Noise, Bow Wow Wow, Heaven 17, A Flock of Seagulls, OMD, Japan, Thompson Twins, Visage, Baltimora, Ultravox, Kano, Tears for Fears, Eurythmics, Frankie Goes to Hollywood, Kajagoogoo, a-ha, Telex, Real Life, Erasure, Camouflage, London Boys, Modern Talking, Bananarama, Yellow Magic Orchestra.

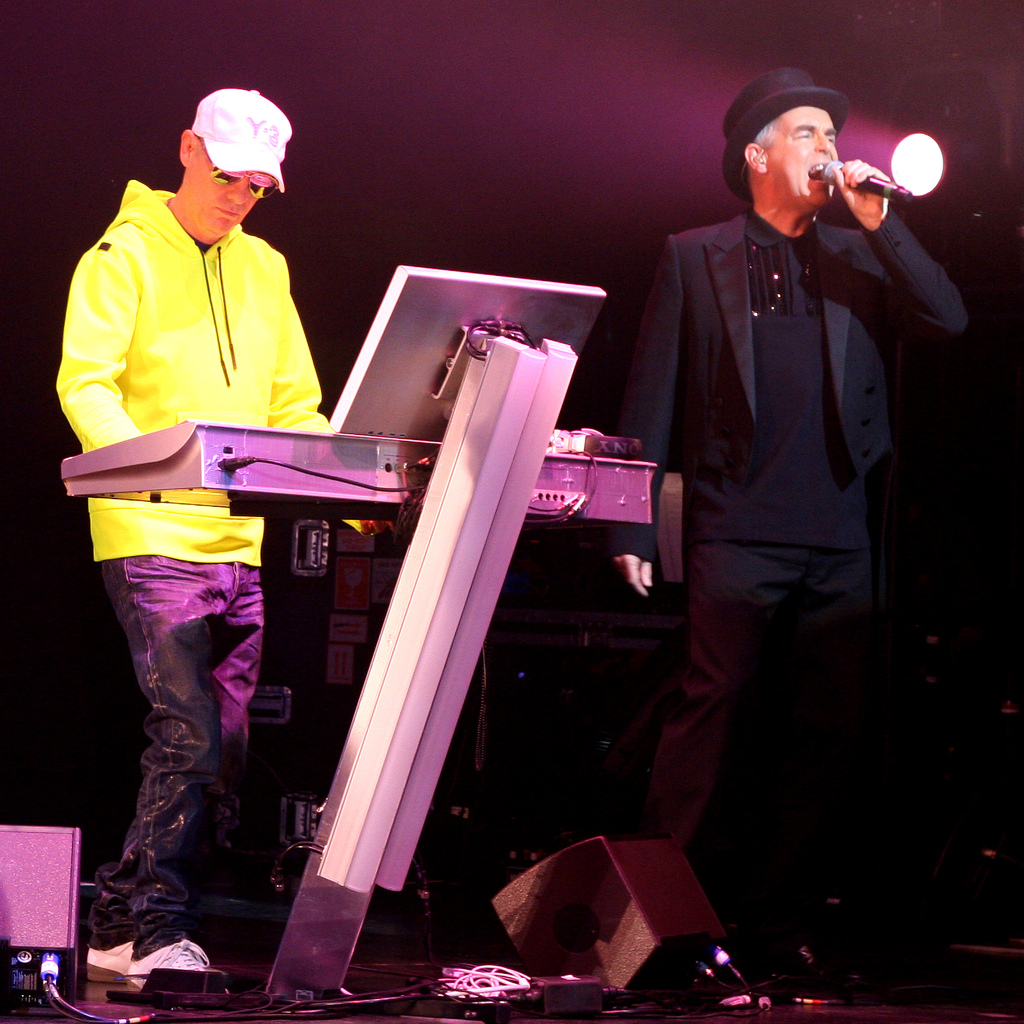
Pet Shop Boys

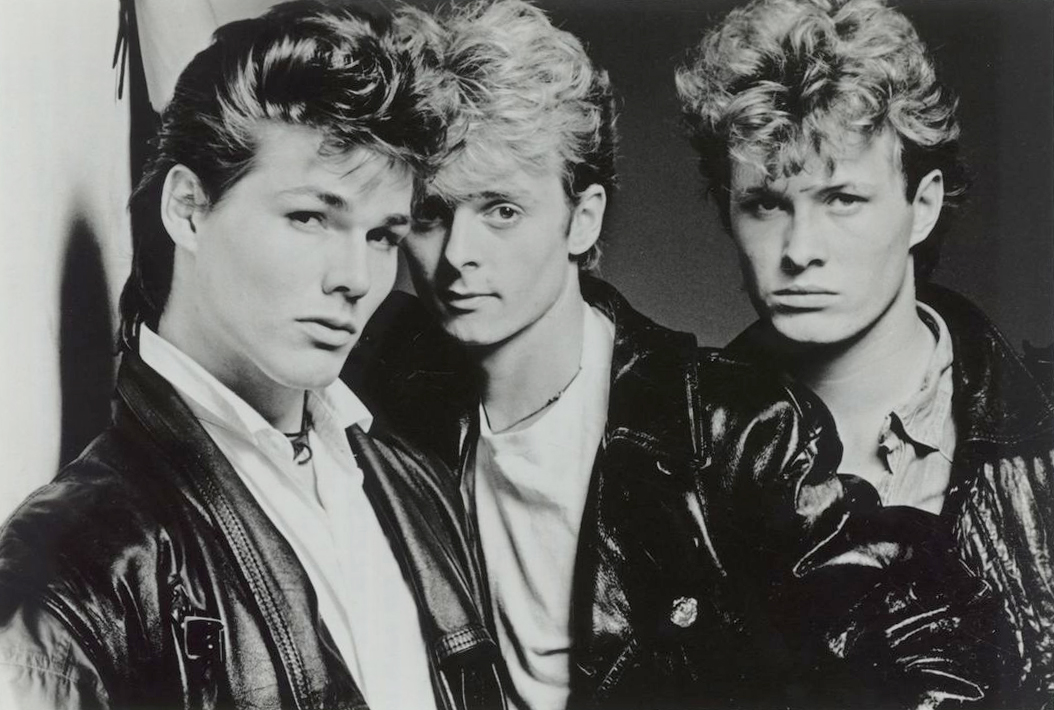
Press photo of A-ha in 1985

==== Italy ====
Artists singing in Italian included Al Bano and Romina Power and Matia Bazar. Rondò Veneziano were a baroque pop outfit.

==== Netherlands ====
Maywood was a very popular act.

==== Germany ====
Arabesque, Modern Talking and Sandra were popular.

==== Austria ====
Falco rose to worldwide fame with his single "Rock Me Amadeus" which reached No. 1 on the Billboard charts in 1986, making Falco the only artist in history to score a number-one hit with a German language song in the United States. He is the best-selling Austrian singer of all time.

== Latin America ==
=== Pop ===
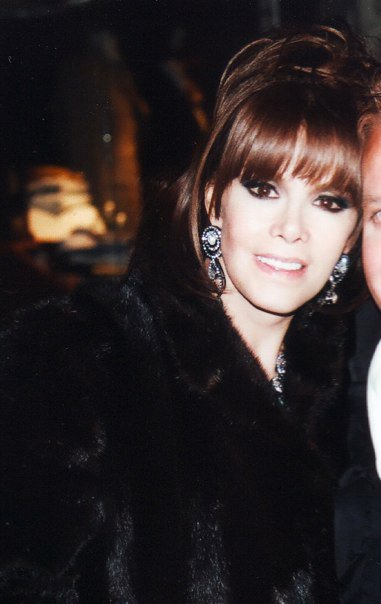
Lucia Mendez in 1980, she opened herself to a wider audience of the pop music genre. By way of introduction from Gabriel, Méndez would collaborate with Camilo Sesto, who was also a contributor to the theme song of the production Colorina.

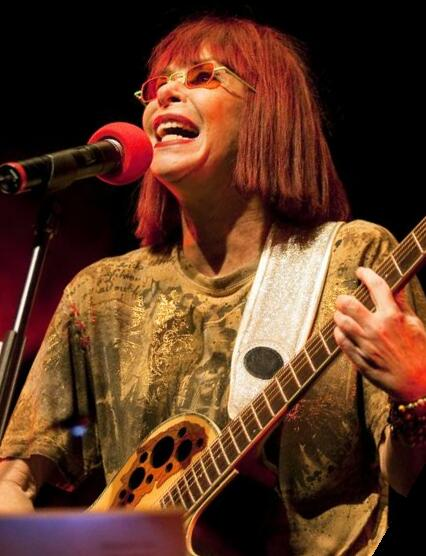
Rita Lee, after her successful stint in rock in the 70s, became the first pop superstar in Brazil.

The 1980s gave rise to the teenage groups Exposé, Menudo, Timbiriche, and Los Chicos, as well as emerging teenage stars such as Luis Miguel, Sasha Sökol and Lucero. By 1988, however, the aforementioned Luis Miguel would transform into an adult superstar at age 18 with the hit La Incondicional (1989). Not too far behind was former Los Chicos' member Chayanne as he became a leading pop star by the end of the decade, with his 1987 hit Fiesta en America. As young stars begin to rise in Latin music, veterans such as Julio Iglesias, Rita Lee, José José, Juan Gabriel, and José Luis Rodríguez El Puma continue their dominance in Latin music. Following the 1981 worldwide success of Lee's "Lança Perfume", which topped the French charts, Gloria Estefan and Miami Sound Machine achieved their own global breakthrough in 1985 with "Conga". Argentine-Venezuelan singer Ricardo Montaner joins those veterans with his 1988 hit Tan Enamorado. After the slow decline of Fania All-Stars, the new romantic genre of salsa Romantica would rise beginning in 1984. Younger salseros such as Frankie Ruiz, Luis Enrique, and Eddie Santiago would take advantage of this new genre rising salsa to new heights. Tejano Music starts to give little rise after Mazz crosses over to Mexico after their albums Una Noche Juntos and No Te Olvidare win Grammys.

In 1989, Juan Luis Guerra scores a major Merengue hit with Ojala que llueva cafe. In the 1980s, the regional music scene in both Mexico and the Mexican-American community in the United States was dominated by grupera. This style of Mexican music combines cumbia, norteño, and rock music. The lyrics are rooted with romantic themes including heartbroken songs. Several notable grupera ensembles include Los Caminantes, Los Yonic's, Los Bukis, and Los Temerarios.

In 1985 Sheena Easton and Luis Miguel win the Grammy Award for Best Mexican/Mexican-American Performance for "Me Gustas Tal Como Eres". Eugenia León, representing Mexico, wins the 14th Annual OTI Festival with her song "El Fandango Aquí". In 1986 Vikki Carr wins the Grammy Award for Best Mexican/Mexican-American Performance for Simplemente Mujer, while Roberto Carlos was awarded the Grammy Award for Best Latin Pop Album for his self-titled record in 1989.

=== Rock ===
The Rock en Español movement began around the 1980s. Until the mid-80s the rock scene of most Spanish American countries was not connected, and it was rare for a rock band to gain acclaim and popularity outside its home country.

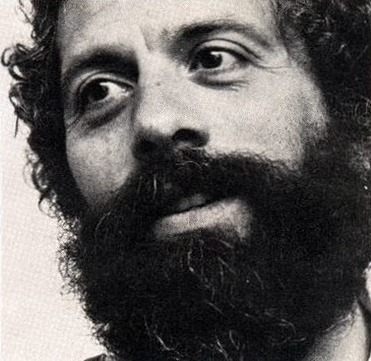
Facundo Cabral

Argentina, which had the largest national rock scene and music industry, became the birthplace of several influential rock acts. Soda Stereo from Buenos Aires is often acclaimed as the most influential rock band of the 80s alongside the solo careers of Charly García, Luis Alberto Spinetta and the new star Fito Páez from Rosario. Soda Stereo was among the first bands to successfully tour across most of Latin America. Argentina developed also during the 80s a ska rock and punk rock scene. The punk movement, which was pioneered by Los Violadores, led to the rise of the Buenos Aires Hardcore around 1990.

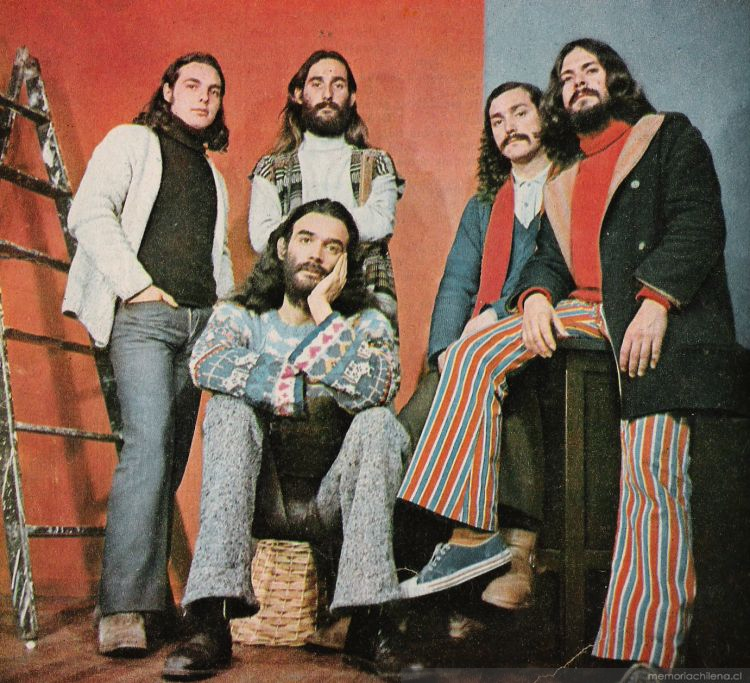
Los Jaivas

In Chile, which was ruled by a military dictatorship all over the 80s, Nueva canción protest songs from the 60s and 70s maintained their popularity despite severe censorship. The progressive/folk-rock band Los Jaivas made a Latin American trademark album with Alturas de Macchu Picchu [sic] based on Pablo Neruda's homonymous poem. The rock band Los Prisioneros were successful in combining the protest song atmosphere of the 80s with newer trends in rock including punk, ska, new wave and techno. In the late 1980s, new bands such as Los Tres and La Ley would start to set the trends for the next decade.

In Brazil, even though the 1960s witnessed the phenomenon of Jovem Guarda and the 1970s saw the appearance of many prolific artists, like Raul Seixas, and bands like Os Mutantes, Brazilian rock's explosion began in 1981 with the first expressions of the Brazilian new wave, later renamed the New Jovem Guarda by the media.

The alterations of the English new wave movement, with its variety of styles, arrived in Brazil through groups and personalities such as Blitz, Camisa de Vênus, Barão Vermelho, Kid Abelha, Paralamas do Sucesso, Ritchie, Lulu Santos, Rádio Táxi, Marina Lima, Engenheiros do Hawaii, RPM, Graffiti, Ultraje a Rigor, Legião Urbana, Ira!, Titãs, Capital Inicial, Nenhum de Nós, Biquini Cavadão, Lobão & Os Ronaldos, Léo Jaime, and innumerous others. In January 1985, the Rock in Rio festival took place in Rio de Janeiro, which brought together over one million people to the Cidade do Rock during the 10 days of the event and is to this day the country's biggest festival. It represents a milestone in freedom of expression, as in that same year the country saw the end of the dictatorship, and it is also responsible for establishing Brazil as a venue for international artists - as, so far, foreign attractions had been rarities.

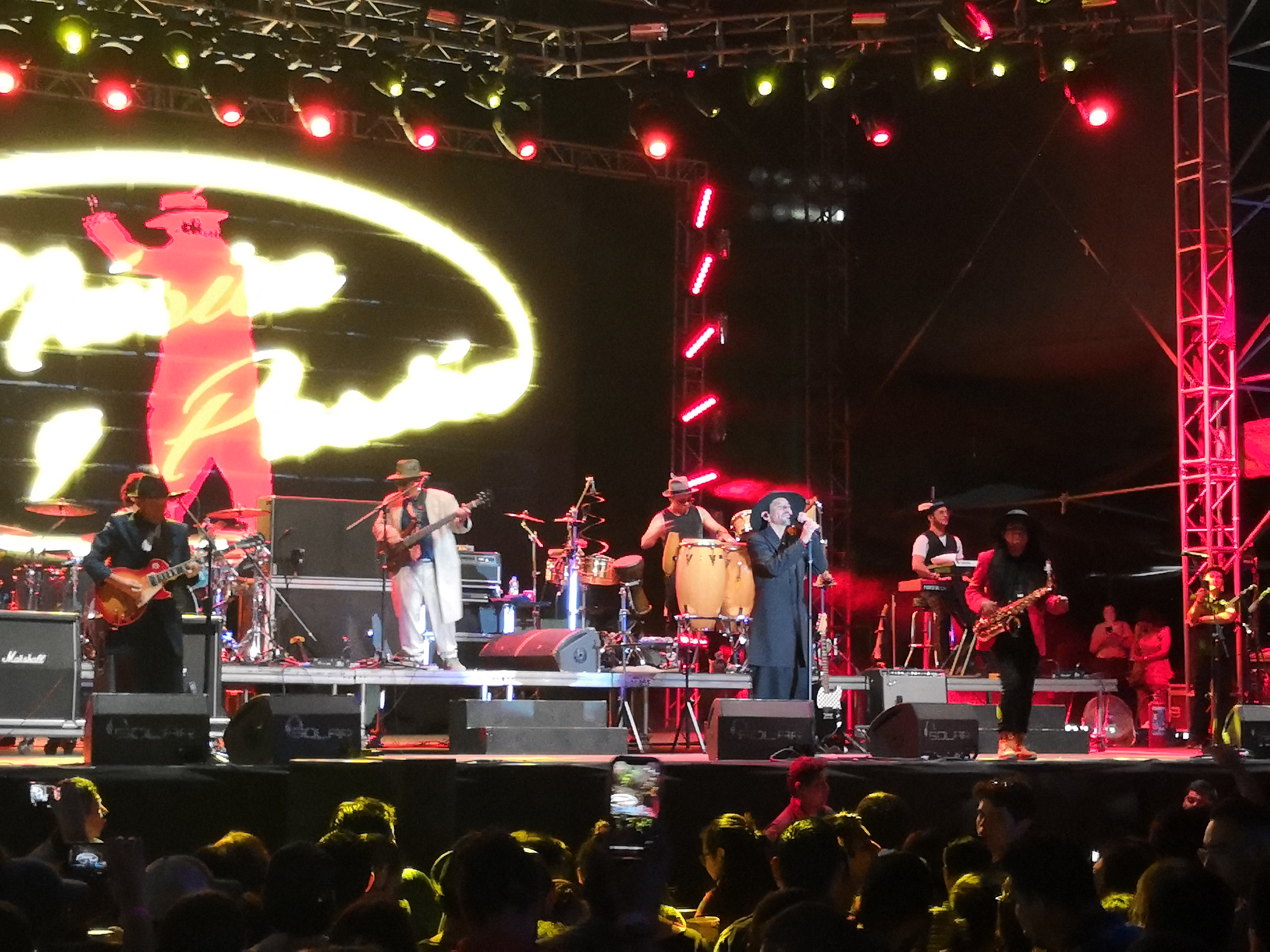
Maldita Vecindad in concert

In Mexico, the Rock music scene at the time first saw a heavy lack of opportunity as musical acts could not make a solid living from playing alone. Other key factors were that of economic and political instability. Many consider this decade as the lost decade. The government would not allow racy-themed content on television and airwaves, music festivals were not allowed. The music that dominated Mexico and much of Latin America during this era was mostly teen-flavored acts like Menudo, Timbiriche, Flans and others.

Rock acts could not land any recording deals because record label executives were much more interested in selling listeners a colourful, hip, and trendy image to the general public ranging from youngsters to middle-aged adults.

With the strong impact of Argentine and Spanish rock bands by the mid-1980s, the local Mexican scene would begin to develop acts that would generate an identity of its own. Among these were bands like Size, El Tri, Maldita Vecindad, Los Amantes de Lola, Kerigma, Neón, Rostros Ocultos, Kenny y los Eléctricos, Maná and Caifanes. This last one is considered by many to be Mexico's most iconic band of all time.

=== Salsa ===
The salsa music had developed in the 1960s and '70s by Puerto Rican and Cuban immigrants to the New York City area but did not enter into mainstream popularity in Latin America until the late 1980s. The salsa music became together with cumbia the two most popular dance music but did not penetrate other countries outside the Caribbean as cumbia did.

The 1980s were a time of diversification, as popular salsa evolved into sweet and smooth salsa romantica, with lyrics dwelling on love and romance, and its more explicit cousin, salsa erotica. Salsa Romantica can be traced back to Noches Calientes, a 1984 album by singer José Alberto "El Canario" with producer Louie Ramirez. A wave of romantic singers found a wide audience among Latinos in both New York and Puerto Rico. The 1980s also saw salsa expand to Mexico, Argentina, Peru, Europe and Japan, and diversify into many new styles.

In the 1980s, some performers experimented with combining elements of salsa with hip hop music, while the producer and pianist Sergio George helped to revive salsa's commercial success. He created a sound based on prominent trombones and a rootsy, mambo-inspired style. He worked with the Japanese salsa band Orquesta de la Luz, and developed a studio orchestra that included Tito Nieves, Celia Cruz, José Alberto, La India, Tito Puente and Luis Enrique. The Colombian singer Joe Arroyo first rose to fame in the 1970s but became a renowned exponent of Colombian salsa in the 1980s. Arroyo worked for many years with the Colombian arranger Fruko and his band Los Tesos.

=== Merengue ===
Merengue music would hit its golden years during the 1980s starting in the late 70s with acts such as Wilfrido Vargas, Johnny Ventura, and Fernando Villalona. Their orchestras would also churn future solo acts such as Eddy Herrera and Rubby Perez. By the end of the decade, La Coco Band would reinvent merengue with a more comedic style.

== Oceania ==
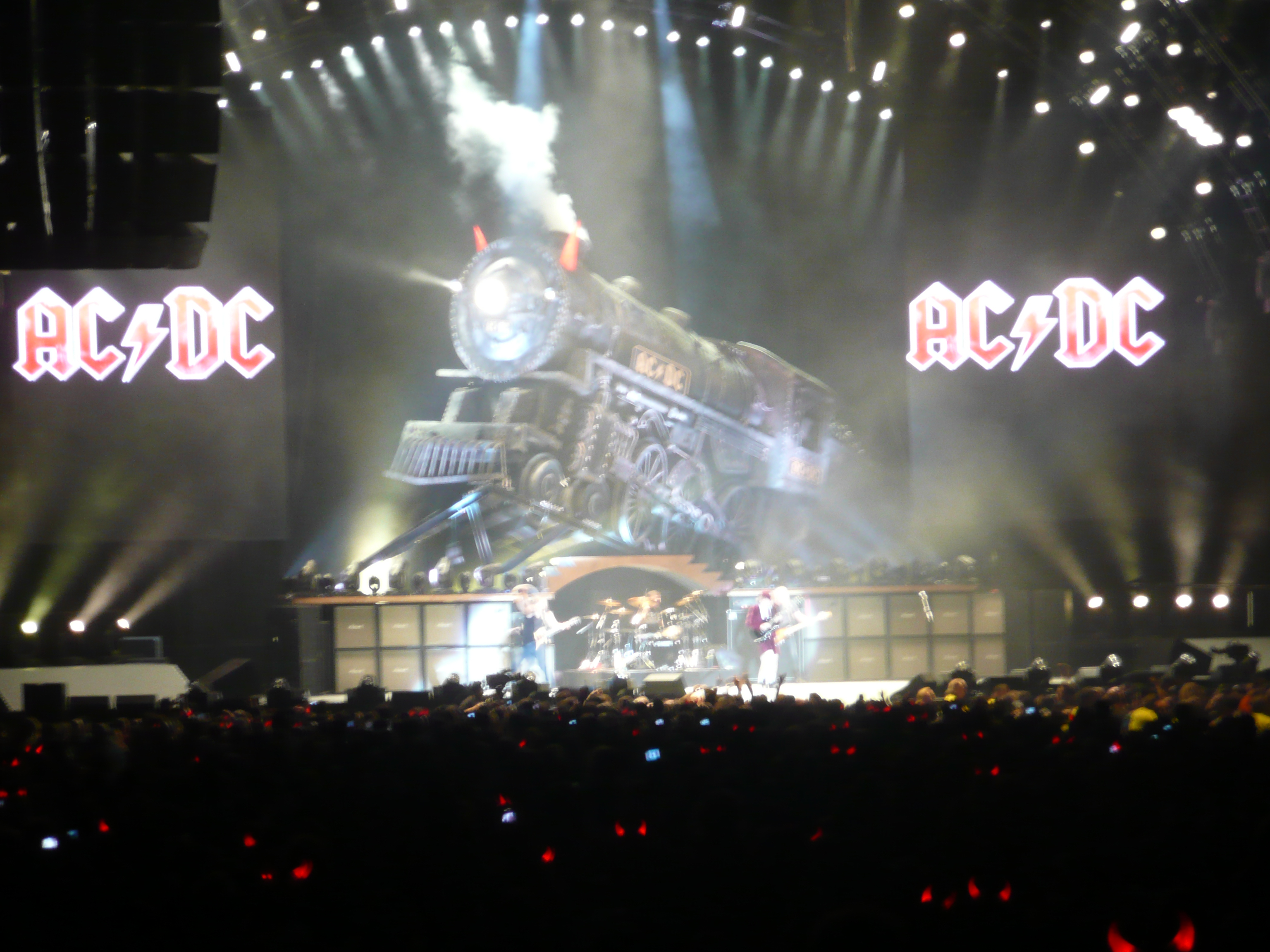
AC/DC performing

=== Australia ===
Australian rock band INXS achieved international success during the decade with a series of hit recordings, including the albums Listen Like Thieves (1985), Kick (1987), and the singles "Original Sin" (1984), "Need You Tonight" (1987), "Devil Inside" (1988) and "New Sensation" (1987).

Kylie Minogue's first single, "Locomotion", became a huge hit in Minogue's native Australia, spending seven weeks at number one on the Australian singles chart. The single eventually became the highest-selling Australian single of the decade. Throughout Europe and Asia, the song also performed well on the music charts, reaching number one in Belgium, Finland, Ireland, Israel, Japan, and South Africa.

The Australian rock band Men at Work achieved break-out success in 1981 and went on to have several hits on the international charts.

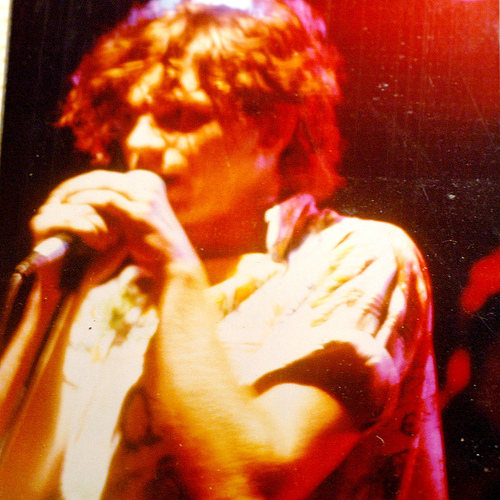
Michael Hutchence singing during an INXS concert, early 1980s

The Church, Real Life and Midnight Oil also had some notable hits on the international charts.

Rick Springfield was well known in the early 1980s, and had several hits.

=== New Zealand ===
In 1980, New Zealand rock band Split Enz released their album True Colours, which became an international success. After the band broke up in 1984, Neil Finn, the younger brother of Tim Finn who had become Split Enz's de facto frontman after Tim's departure in 1983, went on to form Crowded House in New Zealand in 1985. In 1986 Crowded House released their successful self-titled debut album, which went to number one in Australia and number three in New Zealand, as well as reaching the top ten in Canada and top 20 in the United States. It spawned the song "Don't Dream It's Over", which hit number one in New Zealand and Canada, number two in the United States, and number eight in Australia, and has since become a pop/rock anthem in Australasia. Crowded House's follow-up album Temple of Low Men, released in 1988, did not achieve the same success as their debut but was still popular in the band's homelands of New Zealand and Australia...

The New Zealand band Mi-Sex had success with its hit single, "Computer Games"

Other regional bands of note were The Swingers, Coconut Rough, The Crocodiles and Peking Man.

=== Tonga ===
The Jets, a Tongan-American band, had several hits on the international charts in the late 1980s.

== Asia ==
=== Japan ===
During the 1980s, Japan had the second largest music market in the world.

In Japan, bands such as Shonen Knife, Boredoms, The Star Club, X Japan, Dead End and The Stalin began in the Japanese rock bands and visual kei emerged in the 1980s with bands such as X Japan, Buck-Tick and D'erlanger. Japanese noise rock emerged in the 1980s with bands such as Melt-Banana, Zeni Geva and Guitar Wolf in the Japanese indies scene.

Idols included Seiko Matsuda, Akina Nakamori, Hiroko Yakushimaru, Tomoyo Harada, Yōko Oginome, Yoko Minamino, Chisato Moritaka and Wink. Artists in the new music genre included Saki Kubota. Rock bands included Rebecca, Kome Kome Club and the Southern All Stars. Artists in the electronic music genre included Yellow Magic Orchestra.

The song "Hana" (1980) by Shoukichi Kina was a hit overseas, and sold 30 million copies. Eiichi Ohtaki released A Long Vacation.

City pop, an adult-oriented genre with western influences of disco, funk, soft rock, and R&B also became popular with the Japanese tech boom. Popular artists in the genre were Anri and Tatsuro Yamashita. Most songs were about love or living in the city. The genre was barely known outside of Japan. However, city pop has been getting increasingly popular in the West with Internet-borne microgenre vaporwave. On May 3, 2019, Light in the Attic, an independent record label, released Pacific Breeze: Japanese City Pop, AOR and Boogie 1976–1986. It was a compilation album that showcased what city pop is and its style.

Japanese hardcore emerged with bands such as The Star Club and GISM and Japanese idol group Onyanko Club began as an Idol group among the teen fans and youth fans.

=== Hong Kong ===
Besides, Hong Kong saw rapid growth in pop music, both in terms of variety and popularity. Big stars such as Leslie Cheung, Anita Mui, Danny Chan, Alan Tam and Beyond were icons of the decade. The 1980s is still regarded as the most successful period in Hong Kong music history.

=== Indonesia ===
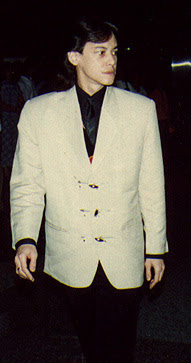
Fariz RM, who contributed to the emergence of pop kreatif

Influenced by Japanese City pop, pop kreatif emerged in the late 1970s and 1980s as an urban, studio-driven strand of popular music shaped by rapid technological change, expanding middle-class audiences, and close exposure to transnational pop trends. Like city pop, pop kreatif drew heavily on Western soft rock, funk, jazz fusion, disco, and adult contemporary aesthetics, with a strong focus on polished arrangements, synthesizers, electric pianos, and sophisticated studio production rather than raw live performance. Indonesian musicians and producers adapted these influences to local tastes and language, blending them with domestic pop sensibilities and lyrical concerns, resulting in a distinct genre that functioned as both a reflection of Indonesia’s modernization in the late New Order period and a regional parallel to wider East Asian urban pop currents of the same era. Popular artists in the genre were Fariz RM, Vina Panduwinata, and Malaysia's Sheila Majid.

Indonesian artist Taco hit it big in the early 1980s with the single "Puttin' On the Ritz", an updated version of the classic 1930s song.

== See also ==
- 1960s in music
- 1970s in music
- 1990s in music

== Sources ==
- Cateforis, Theo (2011b). Are We Not New Wave?: Modern Pop at the Turn of the 1980s. University of Michigan Press. ISBN 978-0-472-03470-3.
- Rose, Tricia (1994). Black Noise: Rap Music and Black Culture in Contemporary America. Middletown, Connecticut: Wesleyan University Press. ISBN 978-0-8195-6275-3.
