= Tambourine (band) =

Dutch pop band

Tambourine was a short-lived, 1960s revival, Dutch pop band formed in 1987. The main bandmembers were: Jac Bico (guitar), Bart van Poppel (bass) and Saskia van Oerle (vocals).

Although Tambourine only released two albums, it gained moderate success in Europe. Its greatest hit was "High Under The Moon" that got to #21 in the Dutch charts, remaining there for 11 weeks as well as making the Swedish and Belgium Top 40. The "Summer Of Love" was released as the first single and it reached the 13th position in the Dutch tipparade on September 24, 1988.

Van Oerle was also a background vocalist with the singer Rob de Nijs. She released a solo album as Van Orly in 2003 called Somebody Hold Me of which the single "Calling Out" drew some attention.

Tambourine disbanded in 1992.
