= The Star Club =

Japanese punk rock band

- Also known as: S★C
- Origin: Nagoya, Japan
- Genres: Punk rock, hardcore punk
- Years active: 1977–present
- Labels: Tokuma Japan, Victor, Speedstar Music
- Members: Hikage; Hiroshi; ToruXXX
- Website: Official website

The Star Club (ザ・スター・クラブ) is an influential Japanese punk rock band that was formed in Nagoya in 1977 and has been based in Tokyo since 1987. The band has had a long career with numerous lineup changes, all centered on vocalist Hikage.

== Biography ==
The Star Club was the first punk band in Nagoya, when they formed in April 1977. Their first release was a live 7-inch vinyl record in 1978 which was "heavily English influenced punk with a rock and roll edge". Into the early 1980s, the band went through several lineup changes while releasing a string of singles, gradually increasing in popularity, with singer Hikage becoming an icon of Japanese punk. The group released their first full-length album in 1983, the live Hot & Cool.

By 1984, the group was topping the independent charts, and signed to the independent Tokuma label, with whom they released the LPs Hello New Punks in 1984 and "Punk! Punk! Punk!" in 1985. The records sold well, and the band was signed to the major label Victor.

The band has been productive over the years, releasing an album of new material every year or so, sometimes dabbling in hardcore punk, sometimes returning to their punk rock roots. The Star Club is still active today, with Hikage as the sole remaining original member.

== Members ==
- Hikage – vocals (1977–present)
- Hiroshi – bass (2003–present)
- ToruXXX – guitar (1990–1993, 2012–present)

=== Former members ===
Guitarists

- Kaoru (1977–1978)
- Ryohjio (1978–1980)
- Kyouji (1980–1982)
- Lou (1982–1989)
- Miki (1989–1990, support)
- Toru (1990–1993)
- Ken (1994–1999)
- Gazz (1999–2000)
- Uki (2000–2001)
- Mitome (2001–2011)
- Takashi "Bancho" Miura (2011–2012)

Bassists

- Eddie (1977–1982)
- Kyouji (1982–1986)
- A Killer (1987–1996)
- Nakaz (1997–2001)
- Hana (2001–2003)

Drummers

- Kouji (1977–1978)
- Bukka (1979)
- Ohguchi (Mickey) (1979–1980)
- No Fun Pig (1980–1985)
- Tatsuya Nakamura (1985–1986)
- Hiro (1987–1993)
- Kishi (1994–1998)
- Keigo Nakata (1999–2001)
- Ryo – drums (2001–2019)
- Masa – drums (2019–2025)

== Discography ==
=== Albums ===
- Hot and Cool (1983.03)
- Hello New Punks (1984.10.25）
- Punk! Punk! Punk! (1985.06.25）
- Final Count (1986.06.21）
- Ground Zero (1986.12.16）
- God Save the Punk Rock (1987.11.21) – cover album
- Rock 'n' Roll Rider (1988.05.21) Oricon Albums Chart Peak Position: No. 61
- Solid Fist (1989.03.21) No. 69
- Frozen Missing Person (凍てついた疾走者, 1990.03.21) No. 47
- Illegal Dial (1991.03.21) No. 76
- Message from Prison (監獄からの伝言, 1992.02.21) No. 38
- Thinking of Murder (思考殺人, 1992.11.21) No. 51
- Foreigner (異邦人, 1994.04.24) No. 69
- Crisis (1995.05.24) No. 69
- Violent Patient Ward (凶暴患者病棟, 1996.04.24) No. 76
- Without a Soul Album (魂のないアルバム, 1997.05.21)
- Brutal Battle Beaten for 41 Minutes and 18 Seconds (41分18秒の苛烈なバトル・ビート, 1998.07.23)
- Pyromaniac (1999.04.21)
- Trigger (Trigger〜起爆剤〜, 2000.04.21)
- 2001 (2001.03.23)
- Where has Punk Gone? (消えたパンク・ロック？, 2002.04.24)
- Style (2003.05.21) No. 254
- Who or Kill the World (誰が世界を殺すのか, 2004.05.20)
- Breach of the Peace (2005.07.07)
- Vintage Breaker (2006.05.03) – self-cover album
- Gimmick (2006.07.31)
- Redemption of Ecstasy (2007.05.30)
- Booster Shot (2008.06.13)
- Culture Killer (2009.04.28)
- Area Free (2010.04.28)
- Energize (2011.05.18)
- Social Junk (2013.04.24)
- Warning Bell (2014.03.26)
- Anti-Love (2015.04.08)

=== Singles and EPs ===
- Toll Gate Ahead (1980.11)
- Club Take One (1981.07.30)
- The Young Assassin (若き暗殺者, 1982.03.15）
- Shut Up (1982.09.14）
- Front Line (1983.09)
- Hello New Punks (1984.10.25） – EP
- Power to the Punks (1985.06.25）
- 10 Teenage Challenge (10代の挑戦, 1986.06)
- Aggressive Teens (1986.11) – Australian only EP
- Red Zone (1987.03) – Australian only EP
- Love You Something (1997.05.21)
- Where has Punk Gone? (消えたパンク・ロック？, 2002.04.24) – EP

=== Live albums ===
- Hot and Cool (1983.03)

=== Compilation albums ===
- The Very Best of The Star Club (1987.09)
- Radical Real Rock (1989.02.25)
- Noiz Zone (1991.09.21) No. 71
- Silent Violence (1994.10.21)
- Cosa Nostra: The Very Best of The Star Club (1995.11)
- Rave with Fury (1996.11)
- Best Selection (1996.12.21)
- Kitty Missiles (1999.07.23)
- The Star Club Best (2003.01.22)
- All Time Best! Only S★C (2003.09.17) No. 165
- Typhoon No.21 We are the Best (2008.11.07)
