= Inside My Head =

Compilation album by Richard Marx
- Released: June 1, 2012
- Recorded: 2008–2011
- Genre: Rock
- Length: 1:44:22
- Label: Frontiers
- Producer: Richard Marx

Richard Marx chronology
The Christmas EP (2011)	Inside My Head (2012)	A Night Out with Friends (2012)

Singles from Inside My Head
- 1. "Wouldn't Let Me Love You" Released: May 21, 2012

Inside My Head is a compilation album by singer-songwriter and producer Richard Marx, his tenth overall. It consists of songs from his previous albums Stories to Tell, Emotional Remains and Sundown, new recordings of some of his biggest hits, and four new songs: "Wouldn't Let Me Love You," "Like Heaven," "All Over Me," and "Scars." "Wouldn't Let You Love Me" was released May 21, 2012 as the lead single. The album itself was released June 1, 2012, exclusively in Europe.

Classic Rock rated the album four stars.

== Track listing ==
All tracks are written by Richard Marx, except where noted.

Disc 1
No.	Title	Writer(s)	Original release	Length
1.	"Had Enough"		Stories to Tell, 2010	3:48
2.	"Wouldn't Let Me Love You"		New recording	3:58
3.	"Like Heaven"		New recording	3:18
4.	"On the Inside"		Stories to Tell	3:15
5.	"Through My Veins"		Emotional Remains, 2008	4:43
6.	"Always on Your Mind"	Marx; Matt Scannell	Sundown, 2008	4:58
7.	"Loved"	Marx; Fee Waybill	Sundown	3:38
8.	"Come Running"		Emotional Remains	4:18
9.	"All Over Me"		New recording	3:23
10.	"Scars"		New recording	3:07
11.	"Done to Me"		Emotional Remains	3:47
12.	"Over My Head"		Emotional Remains	3:56
13.	"Part of Me"	Marx; Scannell	Emotional Remains	4:14
Total length:				51:43

Disc 2
No.	Title	Writer(s)	Original release	Length
1.	"Don't Mean Nothing"	Marx; Bruce Gaitsch	Richard Marx, 1987	4:43
2.	"Should've Known Better"		Richard Marx	4:28
3.	"Endless Summer Nights"		Richard Marx	4:28
4.	"Keep Coming Back"		Rush Street, 1991	5:25
5.	"Take This Heart"		Rush Street	4:04
6.	"Hold On to the Nights"		Richard Marx	5:14
7.	"Angelia"		Repeat Offender, 1989	4:54
8.	"Hazard"		Rush Street	4:59
9.	"Too Late to Say Goodbye"	Marx; Waybill	Repeat Offender	4:47
10.	"Satisfied"		Repeat Offender	3:21
11.	"Right Here Waiting"		Repeat Offender	4:27
12.	"When You Loved Me"		Stories to Tell, 2010	3:22
Total length:				54:12
