= Stories to Tell: Greatest Hits and More =

2021 compilation album by Richard Marx

Compilation album by Richard Marx
- Released: July 2, 2021
- Recorded: 1986–2020
- Genres: Rock; R&B; adult contemporary
- Length: 2:01:17
- Label: BMG
- Producer: Richard Marx

Richard Marx chronology
| Limitless (2020) | Stories to Tell: Greatest Hits and More (2021) | Songwriter (2002) |

Stories to Tell: Greatest Hits and More is a compilation album by American singer-songwriter and producer Richard Marx, released by BMG Rights Management on July 2, 2021. The two-disc album serves as the soundtrack to Marx's autobiography Stories to Tell: A Memoir, featuring a collection of his singles, plus unreleased demo and live recordings.

== Track listing ==
All tracks are written by Richard Marx, except where noted.

Disc 1
| No. | Title | Writer(s) | Original release | Length |
|---|---|---|---|---|
| 1. | "Don't Mean Nothing" | Marx; Bruce Gaitsch | Richard Marx, 1987 | 4:44 |
| 2. | "Should've Known Better" | | Richard Marx | 4:30 |
| 3. | "Endless Summer Nights" | | Richard Marx | 4:29 |
| 4. | "Hold On to the Nights" | | Richard Marx | 5:19 |
| 5. | "Satisfied" | | Repeat Offender, 1989 | 4:14 |
| 6. | "Right Here Waiting" | | Repeat Offender | 4:26 |
| 7. | "Angelia" | | Repeat Offender | 4:57 |
| 8. | "Keep Coming Back" | | Rush Street, 1991 | 5:28 |
| 9. | "Hazard" | | Rush Street | 5:01 |
| 10. | "The Way She Loves Me" | | Paid Vacation, 1994 | 4:15 |
| 11. | "Through My Veins" | | Emotional Remains, 2008 | 4:44 |
| 12. | "Whatever We Started" | | Beautiful Goodbye, 2014 | 3:56 |
| 13. | "Eyes on Me" | | Beautiful Goodbye | 3:05 |
| 14. | "When You Loved Me" | | Stories to Tell, 2010 | 3:22 |
| 15. | "Another One Down" | R. Marx; Lucas Marx | Limitless, 2020 | 3:14 |

Disc 2
| No. | Title | Writer(s) | Length |
|---|---|---|---|
| 1. | "Should've Known Better" (demo) | | 4:24 |
| 2. | "Endless Summer Nights" (demo) | | 4:27 |
| 3. | "Edge of a Broken Heart" (live) | Marx; Fee Waybill | 7:00 |
| 4. | "Arrow Through My Heart" (demo) | Marx; Gaitsch; Waybill | 5:02 |
| 5. | "Right Here Waiting" (demo) | | 4:13 |
| 6. | "Hazard" (demo) | | 4:28 |
| 7. | "Better Life" (live) | Marx; Keith Urban | 6:26 |
| 8. | "Crazy" | Marx; Kenny Rogers | 3:34 |
| 9. | "This I Promise You" | | 4:33 |
| 10. | "To Where You Are" (live) | Marx; Linda Thompson | 3:39 |
| 11. | "Dance with My Father" | Marx; Luther Vandross | 4:20 |
| 12. | "Take Me Down" | Marx; Jillian Jacqueline; Vince Gill | 4:29 |
