= Greatest Hits (1993 Richard Marx album) =

Greatest hits album by Richard Marx
- Released: October 20, 1993
- Genre: Pop rock
- Length: 68:32
- Label: CEMA
- Producers: Richard Marx; David Cole; Humberto Gatica

Richard Marx chronology
Live Music Hall Koln 1992 (1992)	Greatest Hits (1993)	Paid Vacation (1994)

Greatest Hits is the first greatest hits album by singer-songwriter Richard Marx, sold through Avon in 1993. It contains every single released from Marx's first three albums, including an extra track, "Calling You", which was purported to be the fifth single from the album Rush Street before it was decided against it.

== Track listing ==
All tracks are written by Richard Marx, except where noted.

No.	Title	Writer(s)	Original release	Length
1.	"Take This Heart"		Rush Street, 1991	4:10
2.	"Hazard"		Rush Street	5:17
3.	"Chains Around My Heart"	Marx; Fee Waybill	Rush Street	5:42
4.	"Calling You"	Marx; Bruce Gaitsch	Rush Street	4:42
5.	"Children of the Night"		Repeat Offender, 1989	4:44
6.	"Hold On to the Nights"		Richard Marx, 1987	5:07
7.	"Don't Mean Nothing"	Marx; Gaitsch	Richard Marx	4:38
8.	"Endless Summer Nights"		Richard Marx	4:27
9.	"Keep Coming Back"		Rush Street	6:51
10.	"Satisfied"		Repeat Offender	4:14
11.	"Angelia"		Repeat Offender	5:17
12.	"Right Here Waiting"		Repeat Offender	4:24
13.	"Too Late to Say Goodbye"	Marx; Waybill	Repeat Offender	4:52
14.	"Should've Known Better"		Richard Marx	4:07
Total length:				68:32

== Certifications ==
Region	Certification	Certified units/sales
Norway (IFPI Norway)	Gold	25,000^{*}
United States (RIAA)	Gold	500,000^{‡}
^{*} Sales figures based on certification alone.^{‡} Sales+streaming figures based on certification alone.
