= Stories to Tell =

Stories To Tell

Studio album by Richard Marx
- Released: November 9, 2010 (CD)
- Recorded: 2010
- Studios: Renegade Studio; The Tin Ear Studios; Sound Stage; Iron Works
- Genre: Acoustic rock
- Length: 50:06 (Digital); 76:59 (CD)
- Labels: Zanzibar Productions; Wrasse Records; TourDForce Productions LLC
- Producer: Richard Marx

Richard Marx chronology
The Music of Richard Marx: 1987–2009 (2009)	Stories To Tell (2010)	Hits & Ballads (2010)

Alternative cover
- European cover

Alternative cover
- Walmart release cover

Stories To Tell is an acoustic album by singer-songwriter and producer Richard Marx, released by Zanzibar Records on November 9, 2010. The album features acoustic renditions of Marx's hit singles. It is his second album of acoustic reworkings of his previous hits, with the Richard Marx/Matt Scannell album Duo being the first. The 11 track collection was first released in March 2010 and available for purchase exclusively at his solo acoustic concerts. The album was later repackaged and released November 11, 2010 in Europe with an additional 7 bonus tracks featuring songs Marx had written or co-written for other artists such as Keith Urban, NSYNC, and Daughtry, all performed here by Marx. May 3, 2011, the album was again repackaged into a three disc set for an exclusive Wal-Mart stores release. The first disc featured the original 11 songs from the first release of Stories To Tell – along with an acoustic version of Marx's new song "When You Loved Me". The second disc features re-imagined recordings of 11 of Marx's hits plus the studio version of "When You Loved Me." The third disc is a DVD of Marx's concert at Shepherd's Bush in London, England.

== Track listing ==
All tracks are written by Richard Marx, except where noted.

Digital release/Walmart release disc 1/European release disc 1
No.	Title	Original release	Length
1.	"Endless Summer Nights"	Richard Marx, 1987	4:35
2.	"One Thing Left"	My Own Best Enemy, 2004	3:57
3.	"Hazard"	Rush Street, 1991	4:17
4.	"Over My Head"	Emotional Remains, 2008	3:39
5.	"Angelia"	Repeat Offender, 1989	4:39
6.	"Now and Forever"	Paid Vacation, 1994	3:59
7.	"Keep Coming Back"	Rush Street	5:47
8.	"This I Promise You"	Days in Avalon (Japanese release), 2000	4:07
9.	"Loved"	Sundown, 2008	4:21
10.	"Should've Known Better"	Richard Marx	3:18
11.	"Right Here Waiting"	Repeat Offender	4:49
12.	"When You Loved Me"	New recording	3:29
Total length:			50:06

US CD release
No.	Title	Writer(s)	Original release	Length
12.	"This I Promise You"		Days in Avalon (Japanese release)	4:38
13.	"To Where You Are"	Marx; Linda Thompson	New recording	3:34
14.	"Had Enough"	Marx; Chris Daughtry; Jason Wade	New recording	3:48
15.	"On the Inside"	Marx; Daughtry; Chad Kroeger	New recording	3:16
16.	"Never Take Me Dancing"		Flesh and Bone, 1997	5:13
17.	"Everybody"	Marx; Keith Urban	New recording	5:15
18.	"The Best of Me"	Marx; David Foster; Jeremy Lubbock	New recording	4:30
Total length:				76:59

Walmart release disc 2
No.	Title	Writer(s)	Original release	Length
1.	"Don't Mean Nothing"	Marx; Bruce Gaitsch	Richard Marx	4:43
2.	"Should've Known Better"		Richard Marx	4:28
3.	"Endless Summer Nights"		Richard Marx	4:28
4.	"Keep Coming Back"		Rush Street	5:25
5.	"Take This Heart"		Rush Street	4:04
6.	"Hold On to the Nights"		Richard Marx	5:14
7.	"Angelia"		Repeat Offender	4:54
8.	"Hazard"		Rush Street	4:59
9.	"Too Late to Say Goodbye"	Marx; Fee Waybill	Repeat Offender	4:47
10.	"Satisfied"		Repeat Offender	3:21
11.	"Right Here Waiting"		Repeat Offender	4:27
12.	"When You Loved Me"		New recording	3:24

European release disc 2 bonus tracks
No.	Title	Original release	Length
13.	"Now and Forever"	Paid Vacation	3:59
14.	"This I Promise You" (live)	New recording	4:12
15.	"Always on Your Mind"	New recording	3:57

Walmart exclusive DVD: Live at Shepherd's Bush
No.	Title	Writer(s)	Length
1.	"Endless Summer Nights"
2.	"Take This Heart"
3.	"One Thing Left"
4.	"When You're Gone"
5.	"Hazard"
6.	"Through My Veins"
7.	"Always on Your Mind"
8.	"Angelia"
9.	"Everybody"	Marx; Urban
10.	"Should've Known Better"
11.	"Don't Mean Nothing"	Marx; Gaitsch
12.	"Right Here Waiting"

== Chart performance ==
Year	Chart	Position
2011	Billboard Top Independent Albums	34

== Credits ==
=== Personnel ===
- Jo Allen – strings
- Steve Brewster – drums
- Paul Bushnell – bass guitar
- Joanne Davies – background vocals
- Jim Gailloreto – saxophone
- Bruce Gaitsch – writer, guitars, nylon guitar
- Mark Hill – bass guitar
- Steve Hornbeak – piano, harmony vocals
- John Howard – bass guitar
- Michael Landau – guitars
- Herman Matthews – drums
- Jerry McPherson – guitars
- Kevin Marks – guitars
- Jesse Marx – harmony vocals
- Lucas Marx – harmony vocals
- Richard Marx – producer, writer, arrangements, lead & background vocals, acoustic guitar, guitars, keyboards
- Emma Owens – strings
- Rhian Porter – strings
- Matt Scannell – writer, guitars
- Chuck Tilley – drums
- Keith Urban – writer
- Fee Waybill – writer
- Jason Webb – piano, keyboards

=== Engineers ===
- Chip Matthews
- Joel Numa
- Bill Philput
- Matthew Prock
- Jamie Sickora

=== Guest credits ===
- Matt Scannell

== Miscellaneous ==
- This is Marx's first solo acoustic album.
- The track "Loved" features new lyrics not present on the Sundown album version of the same track.
- This is Marx's first album to have three separate releases, each at different times, each with a different album cover.
- The new song, "When You Loved Me", became Marx's first Top 20 hit on Billboard's Adult Contemporary chart in over 13 years.
