= Nothin' You Can Do About It =

Single by Richard Marx

from the album Repeat Offender
- Released: 1989
- Genre: Hard rock
- Length: 4:42
- Label: Capitol
- Songwriter: Richard Marx
- Producers: Richard Marx; David Cole

Richard Marx singles chronology
"Right Here Waiting" (1989)	"Nothin' You Can Do About It" (1989)	"Angelia" (1990)

"Nothin' You Can Do About It" is a rock song recorded by Richard Marx for his second album, Repeat Offender. It is the third single released from the album. "Nothin' You Can Do About It" hit number 12 on Billboard's Mainstream Rock Airplay chart, and in addition has the participation of Steve Lukather on guitar.

== Personnel ==
- Richard Marx – lead and backing vocals
- Michael Omartian – acoustic piano
- Bill Champlin – Hammond B3 organ, backing vocals
- Steve Lukather – rhythm guitar, guitar solo
- John Pierce – bass
- Mike Baird – drums
- Bobby Kimball – backing vocals
