= My Own Best Enemy =

Studio album by Richard Marx
- Released: August 10, 2004
- Studios: Renegade; Capitol Studio B; Noise in the Attic; The Blue Room; Ocean Way; Blackbird; Seventeen Grand; Westlake
- Genre: Rock
- Length: 51:35
- Label: Manhattan
- Producers: Richard Marx and David Cole

Richard Marx chronology
Timeline (2000)	My Own Best Enemy (2004)	Duo (2008)

Singles from My Own Best Enemy
- 1. "When You're Gone" Released: July 2004; 2. "Ready to Fly" Released: May 2005

My Own Best Enemy is the seventh studio album by soft rock singer-songwriter Richard Marx. The album hit No. 126 on the Billboard album chart in 2004. The album produced two singles, "When You're Gone" and "Ready to Fly." Both of them reached the 'Hot Adult Top 40' chart. "Ready To Fly" also hit No. 22 on the adult contemporary chart.

The album marked a return to the microphone for Marx, who had spent the early-2000s as a successful songwriter and producer, after the comparatively weak commercial reception of his last album in 2000.. It also marks a return to Manhattan Records - the record label that released his debut album back in 1987.

As of January 2018, the album had sold a total of 56,958 copies in America per Nielsen SoundScan.

== Track listing ==
All tracks are written by Richard Marx, except where noted.

Standard release
No.	Title	Writer(s)	Length
1.	"Nothing Left to Say"		3:57
2.	"When You're Gone"		4:24
3.	"One Thing Left"		3:55
4.	"Love Goes On"		3:35
5.	"Ready to Fly"		4:39
6.	"Again"		6:17
7.	"Colder"		3:09
8.	"Everything Good"		3:18
9.	"The Other Side"		4:56
10.	"Someone Special"		4:15
11.	"Suspicion"	Marx; Fee Waybill	3:56
12.	"Falling"		5:13
Total length:			51:35

Japanese release bonus track
No.	Title	Length
13.	"Endless Summer Nights" (live)	4:30
Total length:		56:05

Target exclusive edition disc 2
No.	Title	Writer(s)	Length
1.	"Should've Known Better" (acoustic)		3:46
2.	"Don't Mean Nothing" (acoustic)	Marx; Bruce Gaitsch	3:57
3.	"When You're Gone" (acoustic)		3:44
4.	"Hazard" (acoustic)		4:10
5.	"Endless Summer Nights" (live)		4:25

== Personnel ==
- Richard Marx – arrangements, lead vocals, backing vocals (1, 4–6, 8, 10, 11), acoustic guitar (1–3, 5–7, 9, 11, 12), additional electric guitar (5), acoustic piano (5), string arrangements (5, 9, 12), electric guitar (8, 10, 11), keyboards (8, 9), synth bass (9)
- David Cole – virtual synthesizer (2, 6), synthesizers (7, 11), string arrangements (9), keyboard pad (12)
- Gary Smith – Hammond B3 organ (2, 4), keyboards (10)
- J. T. Corenflos – electric guitar (1, 3, 10, 12), guitars (2)
- Keith Urban – guitars (2), guitar solo (2), backing vocals (2), additional guitar (3)
- Michael Landau – guitars (4, 7), additional electric guitar (5), electric guitar (8), guitar solo (8)
- Michael Thompson – acoustic guitar (5), electric guitar (5, 9), guitars (6)
- Shane Fontayne – guitars (6), electric guitar (8, 11)
- Bruce Gaitsch – acoustic guitar (10)
- Paul Franklin – steel guitar (10)
- Glenn Worf – bass (1–3, 10, 12)
- Lance Morrison – bass (4, 7)
- Mark Browne – bass (6, 8, 11)
- Steve Brewster – drums (1–3, 5, 10, 12)
- Matt Laug – drums (4, 7)
- John Blasucci – drum programming (5)
- Greg Bissonette – drums (6, 8, 11)
- Matt Walker – drums (9)
- Eric Darken – percussion (4, 9)
- Stephen Balderston – cello (3, 8)
- Cliff Colnot – cello orchestration (3)
- Arif Mardin – string arrangements (5)
- Jessica Andrews – backing vocals (4)

The Amazing Nashville String Players

- Cello
  - Anthony LaMarchina
  - Carol Rabinowitz
  - Sari Reist
- Violin
  - David Angell
  - David Davidson
  - Connie Ellisor
  - Gerald Greer
  - Connie Heard
  - Pam Sixfin
  - Chris Teal
  - Kathy Umstead
  - Mary Kathryn Vanosdale
- Viola
  - Jim Grosjean
  - Gary Vanosdale
  - Kris Wilkinson (also string contractor)

== Production ==
- Producers – David Cole and Richard Marx
- Recorded and Mixed by David Cole
- Additional Engineering – Matt Prock
- Art Direction and Design – Beth Middleworth
- Creative Director – Gordon H. Lee
- Cover Photo – Paul Elledge
- Other Photos – Clay Patrick McBride
- Management – Wayne Issak and Karen Scott for Issak Entertainment.

== Charts ==
Singles

Year	Song	US A.C.	US Adult Top 40	Germany
2004	"When You're Gone"	-	20	-
2005	"Ready To Fly"	22	29	48
