= Peter Doell =

- Born: Rochester, New York
- Occupations: Recording Engineer, Mixing Engineer, Mastering Engineer

Peter Doell is an American recording and mastering engineer known for his work with Miles Davis, Toto, Céline Dion and The Beach Boys. Doell has been a staff engineer at Capitol Studios, Sunset Sound Recorders and Universal Mastering Studios West. His film and TV work includes Road To Perdition, Black Hawk Down and Monsters, Inc., American Idol, The Voice and Empire.

Doell is a member of the executive committee of the Audio Engineering Society Los Angeles Section, the National Academy of Recording Arts and Sciences Producers and Engineers Wing and past member of the AES Mastering Panel.

== Early life and education ==
Doell grew up in Rochester, New York. His interest in music was sparked by the summer concert series "The Arrangers Holiday" at the Eastman School of Music, where Phil Ramone was the recording engineer. During high school, Doell played the electric bass on bands he put together.

Doell started college enrolled in a biology program to later pursue a career in medicine. He changed from biology to music after seeing the multi-track tape recorders at his college's music department. Doell graduated from University at Albany with a B.A. in Electronic Music Composition.

== Career ==
=== Recording engineer ===
Doell began his career as a recording engineer at Dimension Sound in Boston in 1974. In 1980, he relocated to Los Angeles as a recording engineer at Wally Heider Studios. He was assistant engineer on Eddie Money's album “No Control” produced by Tom Dowd

After a year at Wally Heider, Doell moved to Sunset Sound Factory, where he was a technician for 18 months. In 1983 Doell moved to Capitol Studios, where he worked for 15 years. Peter Doell was the recording engineer for the albums “While the City Sleeps...” by George Benson and “Tutu” by Miles Davis, produced by Tommy LiPuma. He was recommended to LiPuma by James Newton Howard. Davis won the Grammy Award for "Best Jazz Instrumental Performance, Soloist" for his performance on "Tutu".

Throughout the late 80s and 90s, Doell was recording engineer on albums including “Festival” by Lee Ritenour (1988), “Standard Time, Vol. 3: The Resolution of Romance” by Wynton Marsalis (1990), “The Sun Don't Lie” by Marcus Miller (1993), “Duets” and “Duets II” by Frank Sinatra (1993 and 1994), “Falling into You” by Céline Dion (1996) and the original motion picture soundtrack for “Tarzan” by Phil Collins and Mark Mancina (1999).

=== Mastering engineer ===
In the early 2000s, Doell took on a role as mastering engineer. He worked as senior mastering engineer at Universal Mastering Studios West's Studio A. This room was known for its unusually large dimensions for a mastering studio (32’x21’x11’). Doell mastered records from labels affiliated to Capitol Music Group, owned by Universal Music Group (UMG), as well as from independent clients. At Universal, Doell mastered the album "Toto XIV", which won a TEC Award in 2016 in the "Record Production/Album" category.

In February 2016, Doell joined AfterMaster Audio Labs as senior mastering engineer as the company expanded its mastering services.

In September 2022, Doell founded the mastering studio 21st Century Audio. Albums mastered by Doell at 21st Century Audio include "Fifty" by The Manhattan Transfer , "Live in Italy" by the Peter Erskine Trio and "Vulnerable" by Nikkole.

== Audio Lunch ==
Doell organizes a weekly lunchtime gathering in Burbank, California. Producers and engineers meet on the outdoor patio of a Mexican restaurant. Attendance has reached 150.

== Accolades ==
=== Grammy Awards ===
Doell is credited as mastering engineer on the following Grammy-nominated albums at the 65th Annual Grammy Awards:

- Fifty – The Manhattan Transfer (Best Jazz Vocal Album)
- Live in Italy – Peter Erskine Trio (Best Jazz Instrumental Album)

=== RIAA ===
Doell is credited as engineer in the following RIAA certified records:

- A New Day Has Come, Céline Dion (3× Platinum)
- Christmas Memories, Barbra Streisand (Platinum)
- This Time, Dwight Yoakam (3× Platinum)
- If There Was A Way, Dwight Yoakam (Platinum)
- Reckoning, R.E.M. (Gold)

=== Goldmine Magazine ===
Doell is credited as mastering engineer on Nikkole's 2021 album "Vulnerable", chosen #1 on Goldmine Magazine's 2022 Top 10 Soul and R&B albums of the year.

== Selected discography ==
Year	Album	Artist	Role
1970	Asante	McCoy Tyner	Remixing
1972	The Last Session	Lee Morgan	Remixing
1975	Teaser	Tommy Bolin	Mastering
1977	Street Survivors	Lynyrd Skynyrd	Remixing
1986	While the City Sleeps...	George Benson	Engineer
1986	Tutu	Miles Davis	Engineer
1986	Rock Therapy	Stray Cats	Engineer
1986	Abstract Emotions	Randy Crawford	Mixing
1988	Recently	Joan Baez	Engineer
1988	Born 2 B Blue	Steve Miller	Engineer
1989	Repeat Offender	Richard Marx	Engineer
1990	Standard Time, Vol. 3: The Resolution of Romance	Wynton Marsalis	Engineer
1990	If There Was a Way	Dwight Yoakam	Engineer
1991	Back from Rio	Roger McGuinn	Engineer
1992	La Croix d’Amour	Dwight Yoakam	Engineer
1993	This Time	Dwight Yoakam	Engineer
1993	The Sun Don't Lie	Marcus Miller	Engineer
1994	Healing Hands of Time	Willie Nelson	Engineer
1995	Absolutely!	Clayton-Hamilton Jazz Orchestra	Engineer
1996	What the Hell Happened to Me?	Adam Sandler	Engineer
1996	Static Prevails	Jimmy Eat World	Engineer
1996	Stars and Stripes, Vol. 1	The Beach Boys	Engineer
1999	Tarzan (Original Motion Picture Soundtrack)	Phil Collins, Mark Mancina	Engineer
1999	At First Sight (Score/Original Motion Picture Soundtrack)	Mark Isham	Mixing
2000	The Road to El Dorado (Original Motion Picture Soundtrack)	Elton John	Engineer
2000	Complete Blue Note Elvin Jones Sessions	Elvin Jones	Remixing
2002	An American Journey: Winter Olympics 2002	John Williams	Scoring Crew
2002	A New Day Has Come	Céline Dion	Engineer
2002	200 km/h in the Wrong Lane	t.A.T.u.	Mastering
2004	Trios	Wynton Marsalis	Engineer
2006	To Go: Stick It in Your Ear	The Jackson 5	Mastering
2006	To Go: Stick It in Your Ear	Commodores	Mastering
2006	To Go: Stick It in Your Ear	James Brown	Mastering
2007	Hits and Rarities	Sheryl Crow	Mastering
2009	You Never Can Tell: The Complete Chess Recordings 1960-1966	Chuck Berry	Remixing
2009	The High End of Low	Marilyn Manson	Mastering
2009	Let's Talk About Love/A New Day Has Come	Céline Dion	Engineer
2010	Rarities Edition: Street Survivors	Lynyrd Skynyrd	Remixing
2010	Have Mercy: His Complete Chess Recordings (1969-1974)	Chuck Berry	Mixing
2011	Re: (Disc)overed	Puddle of Mudd	Mastering
2011	Beg for Mercy	Adam Lambert	Mastering
2013	Transition	Steve Lukather	Mastering
2013	Made in California	The Beach Boys	Engineer
2013	Icon	Tom Jones	Mastering
2013	Icon	The Beach Boys	Mastering
2014	Genius Loves Company (10th Anniversary Deluxe Edition)	Ray Charles	Mastering
2015	Toto XIV	Toto	Mastering
2016	Dr. Um	Peter Erskine	Mastering
2017	Second Opinion	Peter Esrkine	Mastering
2021	Dimmi di più	Elemento 38	Mastering
2021	Vulnerable	Nikkole	Mastering
2022	Live in Italy	Peter Erskine Trio	Mastering
2022	Fifty	The Manhattan Transfer ft. WDR Funkhausorchester	Mastering
