= Too Late to Say Goodbye (disambiguation) =

Too Late to Say Goodbye is a 2009 American-Canadian television film.

Too Late to Say Goodbye may also refer to:

- "Too Late to Say Goodbye" (song), a song by Richard Marx
- "Too Late to Say Goodbye", a 2015 song performed by Cage the Elephant
- "Too Late to Say Goodbye", a 1989 song performed by Jason Donovan
