= Repeat Offender =

Repeat Offender may refer to:

- Repeat Offender (Richard Marx album), 1989
- Repeat Offender (Peter Elkas album), 2011
- "Repeat Offender" (Time Squad), a 2002 episode of Time Squad
- repeat offender, the concept in criminology and penology, see recidivism

== See also ==
- Repeat Offender Revisited, a 2019 compilation album by Richard Marx
