= List of Hot Adult Contemporary number ones of 1989 =

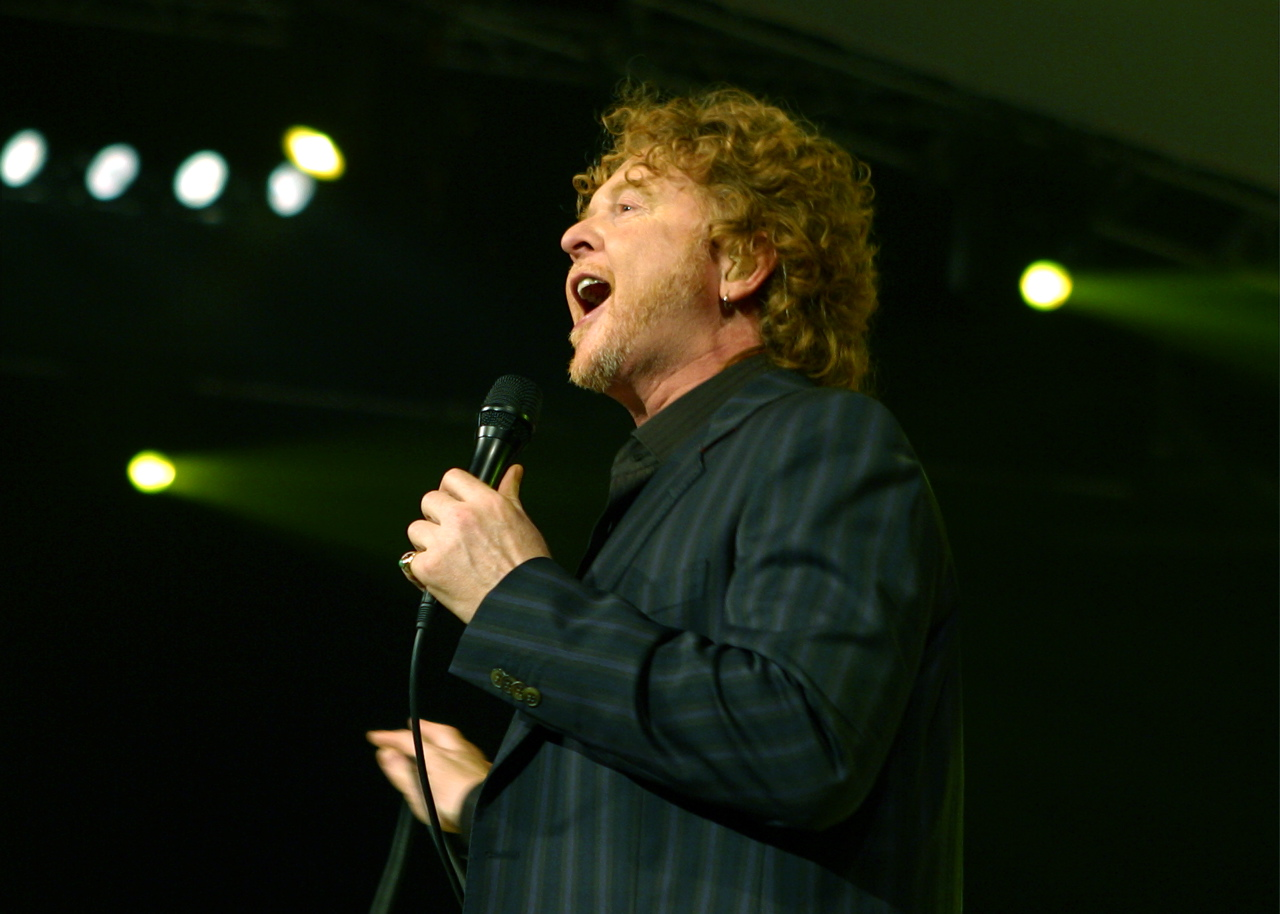
The British band Simply Red (lead singer Mick Hucknall pictured) spent six weeks at number one with their version of "If You Don't Know Me By Now".

In 1989, Billboard magazine published a chart ranking the top-performing songs in the United States in the adult contemporary music (AC) market. The chart, which in 1989 was published under the title Hot Adult Contemporary, has undergone various name changes during its history but has been published as Adult Contemporary since 1996. In 1989, 19 songs topped the chart based on playlists submitted by radio stations.

In the year's first issue of Billboard, the number one song was "Two Hearts" by Phil Collins, which was in its third week at number one, and would go on to spend three weeks at number one in 1989. Collins also spent four weeks in the top spot with "Another Day in Paradise"; the seven weeks which he spent at number one during the year was the most by any act.^{[a]} The only other artist to achieve more than one chart-topper in 1989 was Cher, who spent a single week at number one with "If I Could Turn Back Time" and a further four with "After All", a duet with Peter Cetera. Two songs tied for the longest unbroken run at number one during the year, each spending six weeks atop the chart. The British group Simply Red topped the chart for six weeks in June and July with "If You Don't Know Me by Now" and the American vocalist Richard Marx had a similar run in August and September with "Right Here Waiting".

In February, the Canadian band Sheriff's song "When I'm with You" spent a single week at number one. The song had originally been a minor success in the United States six years earlier, but was re-released in 1989, several years after the band had broken up, as part of a fad of radio programmers reviving songs from earlier in the decade which had not achieved success. The re-issued song went on to top not only the AC listing but also Billboard's pop singles chart, the Hot 100. AC number ones by Phil Collins, Mike and the Mechanics, Simply Red, the Bangles and Richard Marx also topped the Hot 100. Roy Orbison, who had died the previous December, achieved a posthumous Hot Adult Contemporary number one in February when "You Got It" topped the chart. Acts to top the Hot Adult Contemporary listing for the first time in 1989 included the Southern rock group 38 Special. The uncharacteristic ballad "Second Chance", which spent two weeks in the top spot, was the only AC chart entry that the band achieved in its career.

== Chart history ==
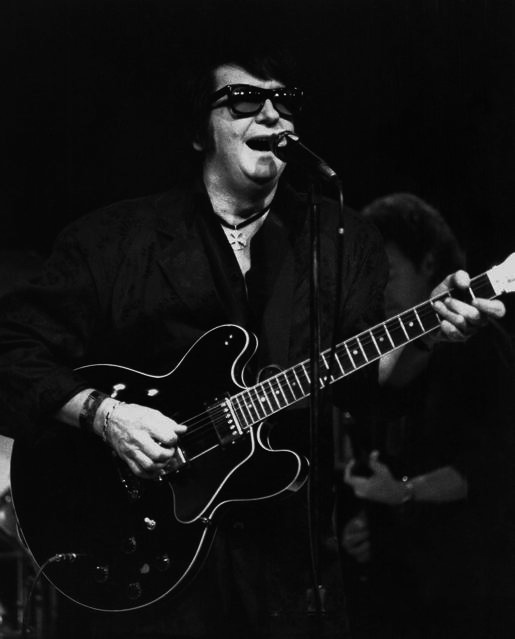
Roy Orbison had a posthumous number one with "You Got It".

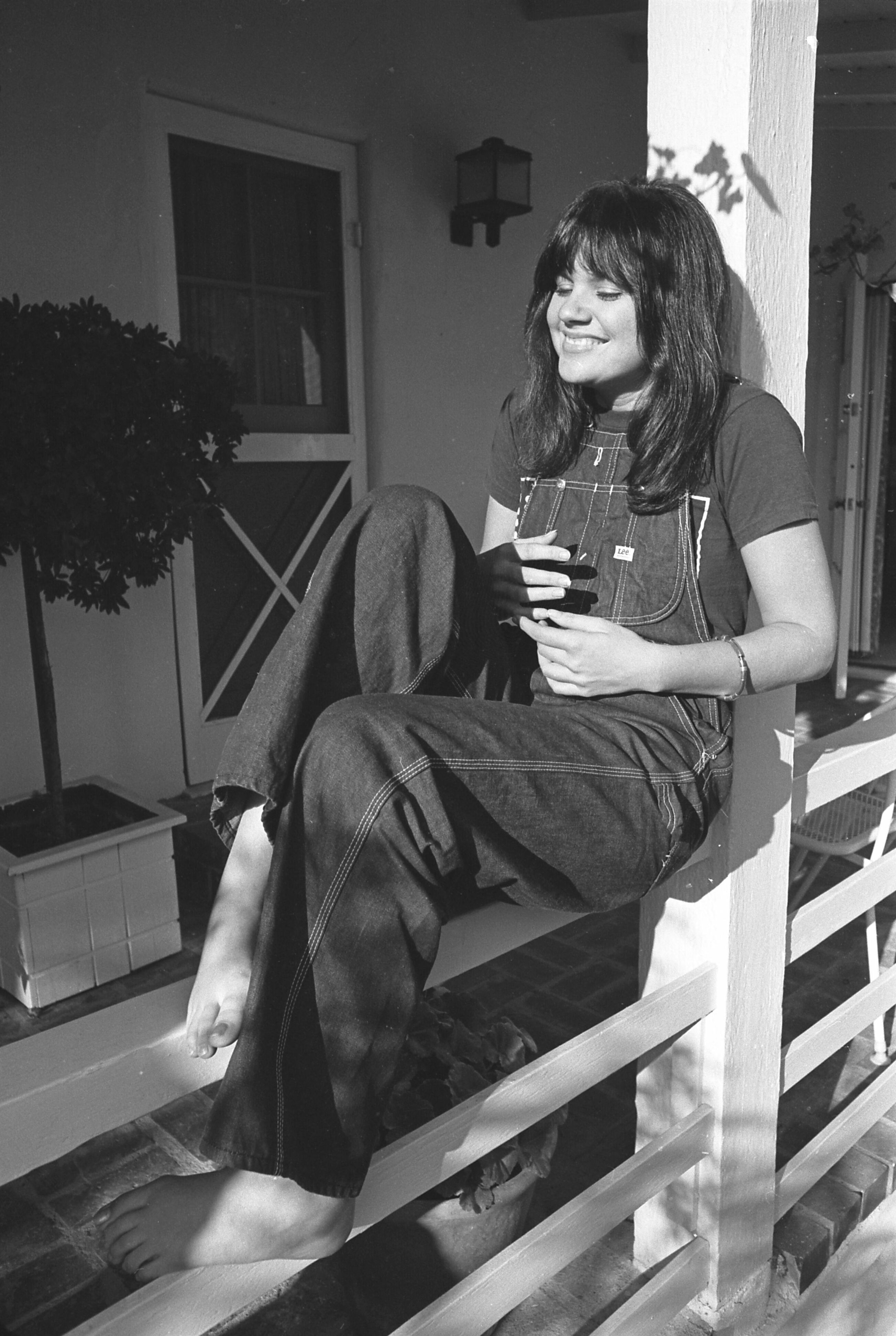
Linda Ronstadt collaborated with Aaron Neville on the chart-topper "Don't Know Much".

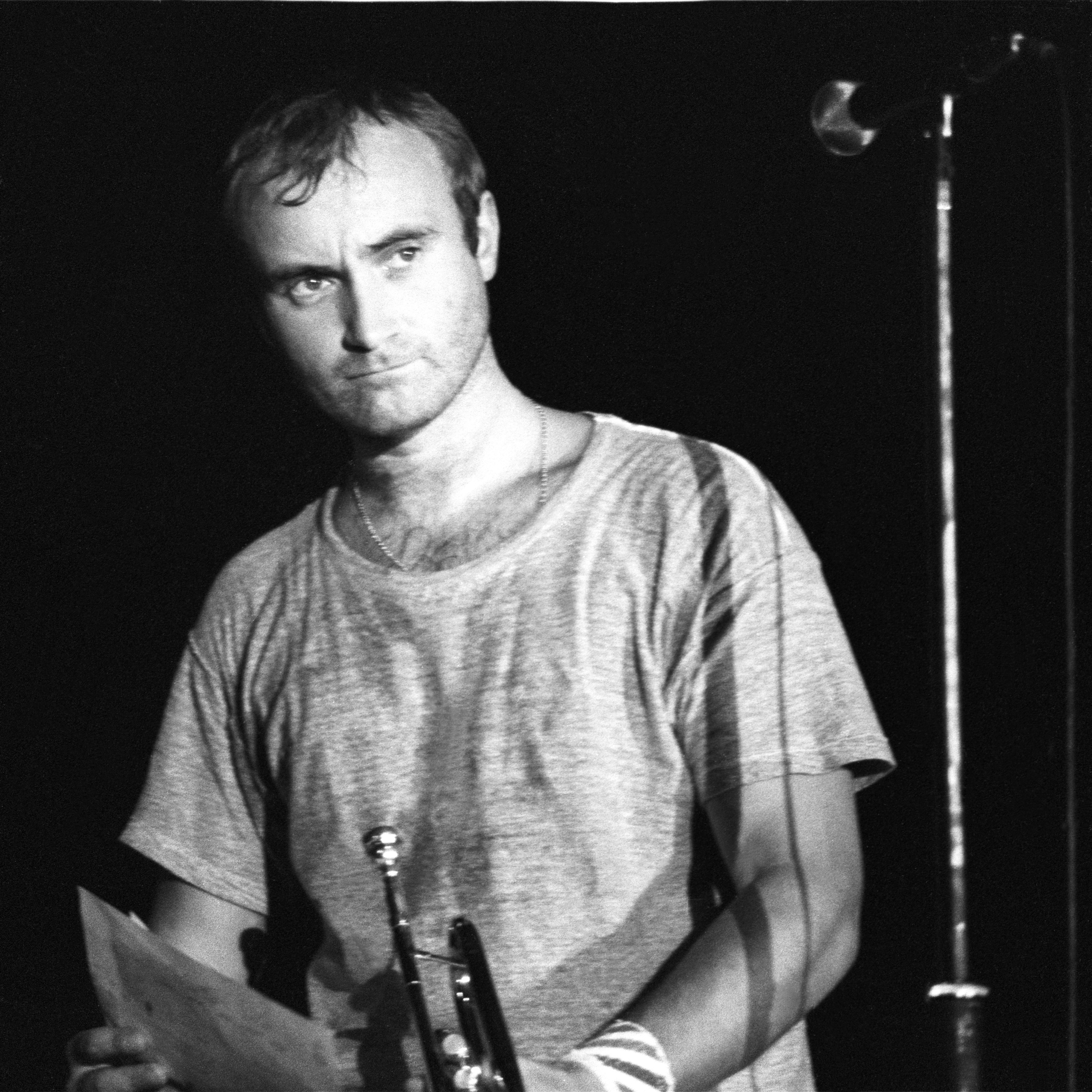
Phil Collins both began and ended the year at number one.

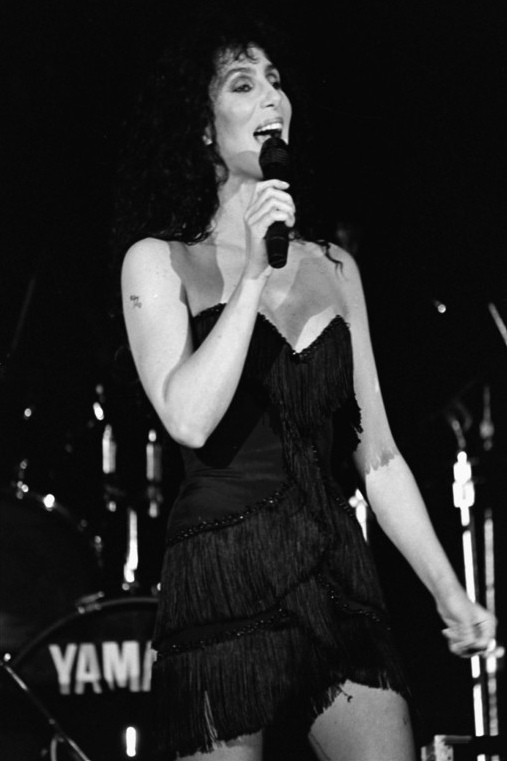
Cher had two number ones in 1989.

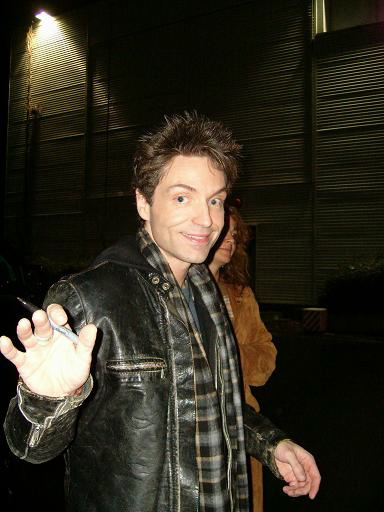
Richard Marx spent six weeks at number one with the song "Right Here Waiting".

Issue date	Title	Artist(s)	Ref.
January 7	"Two Hearts"	Phil Collins	
January 14	"Two Hearts"	Phil Collins	
January 21	"Two Hearts"	Phil Collins	
January 28	"As Long as You Follow"	Fleetwood Mac	
February 4	"Holding On"	Steve Winwood	
February 11	"Holding On"	Steve Winwood	
February 18	"When I'm with You"	Sheriff	
February 25	"The Living Years"	Mike and the Mechanics	
March 4	"The Living Years"	Mike and the Mechanics	
March 11	"The Living Years"	Mike and the Mechanics	
March 18	"The Living Years"	Mike and the Mechanics	
March 25	"You Got It"	Roy Orbison	
April 1	"You Got It"	Roy Orbison	
April 8	"Eternal Flame"	The Bangles	
April 15	"Eternal Flame"	The Bangles	
April 22	"After All"	Cher and Peter Cetera	
April 29	"After All"	Cher and Peter Cetera	
May 6	"After All"	Cher and Peter Cetera	
May 13	"After All"	Cher and Peter Cetera	
May 20	"Second Chance"	38 Special	
May 27	"Second Chance"	38 Special	
June 3	"Miss You Like Crazy"	Natalie Cole	
June 10	"Everlasting Love"	Howard Jones	
June 17	"Everlasting Love"	Howard Jones	
June 24	"If You Don't Know Me by Now"	Simply Red	
July 1	"If You Don't Know Me by Now"	Simply Red	
July 8	"If You Don't Know Me by Now"	Simply Red	
July 15	"If You Don't Know Me by Now"	Simply Red	
July 22	"If You Don't Know Me by Now"	Simply Red	
July 29	"If You Don't Know Me by Now"	Simply Red	
August 5	"Right Here Waiting"	Richard Marx	
August 12	"Right Here Waiting"	Richard Marx	
August 19	"Right Here Waiting"	Richard Marx	
August 26	"Right Here Waiting"	Richard Marx	
September 2	"Right Here Waiting"	Richard Marx	
September 9	"Right Here Waiting"	Richard Marx	
September 16	"One"	Bee Gees	
September 23	"One"	Bee Gees	
September 30	"If I Could Turn Back Time"	Cher	
October 7	"Cherish"	Madonna	
October 14	"Cherish"	Madonna	
October 21	"Healing Hands"	Elton John	
October 28	"Don't Know Much"	Linda Ronstadt and Aaron Neville	
November 4	"Don't Know Much"	Linda Ronstadt and Aaron Neville	
November 11	"Don't Know Much"	Linda Ronstadt and Aaron Neville	
November 18	"Don't Know Much"	Linda Ronstadt and Aaron Neville	
November 25	"Don't Know Much"	Linda Ronstadt and Aaron Neville	
December 2	"Another Day in Paradise"	Phil Collins	
December 9	"Another Day in Paradise"	Phil Collins	
December 16	"Another Day in Paradise"	Phil Collins	
December 23	"Another Day in Paradise"	Phil Collins	
December 30	"How Am I Supposed to Live Without You"^{[a]}	Michael Bolton	

=== Notes ===
a. Due to the holiday period, Billboard did not publish an issue dated December 30, 1989. The issue dated January 6, 1990 showed the previous week's position of every song in the Hot Adult Contemporary chart as identical to the chart dated December 23, which would have given "Another Day in Paradise" a fifth consecutive week at number one and Phil Collins a total of eight weeks at number one during 1989. Billboard has since published a revised chart dated December 30 on its website showing "How Am I Supposed to Live Without You" at number one.
