= Limitless (Richard Marx album) =

Studio album by Richard Marx
- Released: February 7, 2020
- Genres: Pop rock; country
- Length: 41:59
- Label: BMG
- Producers: Richard Marx; Lucas Marx; Michael Jade; Morgan Page; David Pramik; Matt Scannell; Ross Copperman

Richard Marx chronology
Repeat Offender Revisited (2019)	Limitless (2020)	Stories to Tell: Greatest Hits and More (2021)

Singles from Limitless
- 1. "Last Thing I Wanted" Released: May 13, 2016; 2. "Another One Down" Released: June 30, 2019; 3. "Let Go" Released: October 14, 2019; 4. "Front Row Seat" Released: January 10, 2020; 5. "Limitless" Released: March 16, 2020

Limitless is the twelfth studio album (36th overall) by American singer-songwriter and record producer/arranger Richard Marx, released on February 7, 2020. It is his first studio album since 2014. It was the first time Marx had recorded an album without the conscious thought of making an album.

== Development ==
Marx usually produces his albums by himself but this time, he worked with several different producers, all of whom also co-wrote a majority of the songs on the album as well. His son Lucas was one of the producers who also co-wrote two of the tracks, including the single "Another One Down".

"I wasn't really sure what making a new album meant for an artist like me," Marx said of the creative process behind Limitless. "All I knew was that I still write songs all the time and I realised I had a collection of songs I really liked. In my past, my only criteria were to write and record songs that pleased me, and hopefully other people would like them, too. So I returned to that ideology and dismissed any concerns of stylistic consistency and the next thing I knew, I had recorded a diverse album I really liked."

The album was dedicated to his wife Daisy Fuentes.

== Chart performance ==
Limitless became Marx's first studio album to chart overseas since 2004's My Own Best Enemy.

"Another One Down" was released several months prior to the album and peaked at No. 14 on the Adult Contemporary chart.

== Track listing ==
Limitless track listing
No.	Title	Writer(s)	Length
1.	"Another One Down"	Richard Marx; Lucas Marx	3:13
2.	"Limitless"	R. Marx; Michael Jade	3:03
3.	"Love Affair That Lasts Forever"	R. Marx	3:28
4.	"Let Go"	R. Marx; Morgan Page; Daisy Fuentes	3:44
5.	"All Along"	R. Marx; L. Marx	3:17
6.	"Up All Night"	R. Marx	3:48
7.	"Front Row Seat"	R. Marx; Matt Scannell; Darrell Brown	3:28
8.	"Strong Enough" (featuring Jana Kramer)	R. Marx; Jason Wade	3:36
9.	"Not In Love"	R. Marx; Sara Bareilles	3:59
10.	"Break My Heart Tonight"	R. Marx; Scannell	3:11
11.	"Last Thing I Wanted"	R. Marx; Ashley Gorley; Ross Copperman	2:54
12.	"This One"	R. Marx; Scannell	4:24
Total length:			41:59

== Personnel ==
- Richard Marx – lead vocals, backing vocals, acoustic piano, keyboards, synth bass, acoustic guitar
- Ross Copperman – instrumentation, programming
- Michael Jade – instrumentation, keyboards, programming, guitars, backing vocals
- Lucas Marx – instrumentation, programming, arrangements
- Morgan Page – synthesizers, programming
- Jason Webb – keyboards
- Jerry McPherson – guitars
- Matt Scannell – acoustic guitar, guitars, bass, drum programming
- Mark Hill – bass
- Steve Brewster – drums
- Jana Kramer – lead vocals (8)

== Production ==
- Production – Ross Copperman, Michael Jade, Lucas Marx, Richard Marx, Morgan Page, David Pramik, and Matt Scannell
- Mixing – Michael Jade, Lucas Marx, Chip Matthews, and Mat Prock
- Mastering – Mat Prock
- Art Direction – Paula Scher
- Design – Dale Voelker
- Photography – Mike Helfrich

== Charts ==
Sales chart performance for Limitless
Chart (2020)	Peak position
Australian Albums (ARIA)	77
German Albums (Offizielle Top 100)	91
Swiss Albums (Schweizer Hitparade)	64

== See also ==
- List of 2020 albums
