= Living in the Real World =

Living in the Real World may refer to:

- "Living in the Real World", a 1979 song by Blondie from Eat to the Beat
- "Living in the Real World", a 1989 song by Richard Marx from Repeat Offender
