= Crescent City Christmas Card =

Studio album by Wynton Marsalis
- Released: October 3, 1989
- Recorded: January 24–25 and April 3–4, 1989
- Studio: RCA, New York City
- Genre: Christmas, jazz
- Length: 55:33
- Label: Columbia
- Producer: Steven Epstein, George Butler

Wynton Marsalis chronology
The Majesty of the Blues (1989)	Crescent City Christmas Card (1989)	Standard Time, Vol. 3: The Resolution of Romance (1990)

Professional ratings
Review scores
Source	Rating
The Penguin Guide to Jazz Recordings	3.5/4 stars

Crescent City Christmas Card is an album by jazz trumpeter Wynton Marsalis that was released in 1989. The album reached a peak position of number fourteen on Billboard's Top Jazz Albums chart.

== Track listing ==
No.	Title	Writer(s)	Length
1.	"Carol of the Bells"	Mykola Leontovych/Traditional	4:56
2.	"Silent Night"	Franz Grüber, Joseph Mohr	4:47
3.	"Hark! The Herald Angels Sing"	Felix Mendelssohn, Charles Wesley	3:09
4.	"The Little Drummer Boy"	Katherine Davis, Henry Onorati, Harry Simeone	5:29
5.	"We Three Kings"	John Henry Hopkins Jr.	5:22
6.	"O Tannenbaum"	Traditional	1:39
7.	"Sleigh Ride"	Leroy Anderson, Mitchell Parish	4:29
8.	"Let It Snow! Let It Snow! Let It Snow!"	Sammy Cahn, Jule Styne	4:20
9.	"God Rest Ye Merry Gentlemen"	Traditional	5:43
10.	"Winter Wonderland"	Felix Bernard, Richard B. Smith	2:55
11.	"Jingle Bells"	James Lord Pierpont	3:23
12.	"O Come All Ye Faithful"	Frederick Oakeley, John Reading, John Francis Wade	1:37
13.	"'Twas the Night Before Christmas"	Clement Clarke Moore/Traditional	8:07

== Personnel ==
- Wynton Marsalis – trumpet, narrator, arranger
- Kathleen Battle – vocals
- Jon Hendricks – vocals
- Wessell Anderson – alto saxophone
- Todd Williams – clarinet, soprano saxophone, tenor saxophone
- Alvin Batiste – clarinet
- Joe Temperley – bass clarinet, baritone saxophone
- Wycliffe Gordon – trombone
- Marcus Roberts – piano
- Reginald Veal – bass
- Ben Riley – drums
- Herlin Riley – drums

Technical

- Steven Epstein – producer
- George Butler – executive producer, producer
- Dennis Ferrante – engineer
- Tim Geelan – engineer
- Stanley Crouch – liner notes
