= The Christmas EP (Richard Marx EP) =

EP by Richard Marx
- Released: November 1, 2011
- Recorded: Renegade Studio, Blackbird Studios
- Genre: Pop
- Length: 17:17
- Label: Zanzibar Records, TourDeForce Productions
- Producer: Richard Marx

Richard Marx chronology
Duo Live (2010)	The Christmas EP (2011)	Inside My Head (2012)

The Christmas EP is a Christmas album by musician Richard Marx. It was released on November 1, 2011, with the intention of recording an additional seven songs to add to the five songs to make a full-length album for release in 2012, which would become Christmas Spirit.

It was his 23rd overall album, with the lead-off single "Christmas Spirit" being his 32nd single. The track reached #15 on Billboard's Adult Contemporary chart in December, giving Marx back-to-back Top 20 AC hits in 2011 (his first time since 1997).

== Track listing ==
1. "Christmas Spirit" (Marx, Waybill)
2. "O Holy Night" (Adolphe Adam, Placide Cappeau)
3. "Silent Night" (duet with Sara Watkins) (Franz Xaver Gruber, Joseph Mohr)
4. "I Heard The Bells On Christmas Day" (Henry Wadsworth Longfellow, Johnny Marks)
5. "Alleluia" (Larry Gatlin)

== Album credits ==
=== Personnel ===
- Steve Brewster – drums
- Cliff Colnot – string arrangements
- Mark Hill – bass guitar
- Brandon Marx – guitars, drums, background vocals
- Jesse Marx – keyboards, background vocals
- Lucas Marx – guitars, background vocals
- Richard Marx – producer, writer, arrangements, lead vocals, acoustic guitar
- Jerry McPherson – electric guitar
- Jason Webb – keyboards, piano
- Michael Omartian – piano
- Sara Watkins – lead vocals
- Fee Waybill – writer

=== Background Vocals ===
- Opal Staples
- Simbryt Whittington

=== Engineers ===
- Chip Matthews
- Justin Niebank
- Matthew Prock
- Benny Quinn
