= After Hours (Richard Marx album) =

Studio album by Richard Marx
- Released: January 16, 2026
- Recorded: February 2025
- Studio: Evergreen Studios
- Genres: Jazz; easy listening
- Length: 43:24
- Labels: Richard Marx, Inc.
- Producer: Richard Marx

Richard Marx chronology
Songwriter (2022)	After Hours (2026)

Singles from After Hours
- 1. "Magic Hour" Released: August 4, 2025; 2. "All I Ever Needed" Released: September 26, 2025; 3. "Big Band Boogie" Released: October 24, 2025; 4. "The Way You Look Tonight" Released: November 21 24, 2025; 5. "Young at Heart" Released: January 16, 2026

After Hours is the 14th studio album by American singer-songwriter and record producer/arranger Richard Marx, released on January 16, 2026. It includes seven jazz standards and six original songs in related styles.

The album debuted at No. 14 on the Billboard Traditional Jazz Albums chart and No. 18 on the Jazz Albums chart. This was Marx's first time on the Billboard jazz charts after having previously charted on the pop, adult, country, R&B and rock charts.

Marx recorded the album with pianist Randy Waldman, drummer Vinnie Colaiuta, guitarist Dean Parks, bassist Carlitos Del Puerto, and a 24-piece orchestra over three days at Evergreen Studios in Burbank, California.

== Background ==
This excursion into a different-than-usual genre for Marx was when he happened to hear Frank Sinatra's recording of "Fly Me to the Moon" and conceived a slower, ballad version. Audiences responded enthusiastically to his performances of his new arrangement, inspiring him to record an album paying tribute to the Great American Songbook.

Marx previewed the album during an October 2025 residency in New York City called "After Hours: Confessions at Café Carlyle" in which he sang jazz standards and his own hits and new songs with a 24-piece orchestra.

== Track listing ==
After Hours track listing
No.	Title	Writer(s)	Original artist	Length
1.	"Love Is Here to Stay" (featuring Randy Waldman)	George Gershwin; Ira Gershwin	Gene Kelly	3:16
2.	"All I Ever Needed" (featuring Chris Botti)	Richard Marx	Richard Marx	3:39
3.	"Young at Heart" (featuring Rod Stewart)	Johnny Richards; Carolyn Leigh	Frank Sinatra	3:05
4.	"The Way You Look Tonight"	Jerome Kern; Dorothy Fields	Fred Astaire	3:32
5.	"Magic Hour"	Marx; Daisy Fuentes	New recording	2:30
6.	"Moonlight Serenade"	Glenn Miller; Mitchell Parish	Glenn Miller and His Orchestra	2:55
7.	"Not Like This"	Jeremy Lubbock	Jeremy Lubbock	2:41
8.	"Days of You" (featuring Drea Tomé)	Marx; Fee Waybill	Richard Marx	3:39
9.	"Forgot to Remember"	Marx; Matthew Scannell; Chris Mann	Richard Marx	3:48
10.	"Summer Wind" (featuring Tom Scott)	Heinz Meier; Johnny Mercer	Wayne Newton	3:19
11.	"Big Band Boogie" (featuring Kenny G)	Marx	New recording	3:06
12.	"Raise a Glass"	Marx	New recording	3:30
13.	"Fly Me to the Moon"	Bart Howard	Frank Sinatra	4:25
Total length:				43:14

== Personnel ==
- Richard Marx – lead vocals (all tracks)
- Randy Waldman – piano (all tracks)
- Vinnie Colaiuta – drums (all tracks except 7)
- Carlitos Del Puerto – bass (all tracks except 7)
- Dean Parks – guitar (all tracks except 7)
- Chris Botti – trumpet solo (2)
- Rod Stewart – lead vocals (3, 11)
- Greg Jamrok – conductor (3, 11)
- Rob Eckland – conductor (1–2, 4–10, 12–13), arranger (1–6, 8–12), adapter (7)
- John Stamos – percussion (5, 8, 10)
- Drea Tomé – vocals (9)
- Kenny G – sax (11)
- Jeremy Lubbock – arranger (7)
- Charlie Bisharat (concertmaster), Mark Cargill (concertmaster), Richard Adkins, Mui-yee Chu, Joel Derouin, Nicole Garcia, Christian Hebel, Marisa Kuney, Kathleen Robertson – violin
- Rodney Wirtz, Tianna Heppner, Rocio Marron, John Pollock – viola
- Peggy Baldwin – cello
- Reggie Hamilton – bass
- Sal Lozano, Jacob Scesney, Adam Schroeder, Tim McKay – sax/woodwinds
- Ryan Deweese, Laura Brenes – trumpet
- Andy Martin, Alan Kaplan – trombone

=== Production ===
- Richard Marx – producer (all tracks), arranger (13)
- David Cole – engineering (1-2, 4-6, 8-10, 12-13), mixing (1-2, 4-6, 8-10, 12-13)
- Dave Spreng – engineering (3, 11), mixing (3, 11)
- Kevin Savigar – Rod Stewart vocal production (3)
- Lucas Marx – additional engineering (5, 8, 10)
- Matthew Prock – mastering
- Hannah Kacmarsky – assistant engineering
- Shade Tramp – studio assistant
- Brandon Marx – album cover
- Jamieson Mundy – photography

== Charts ==
Chart performance for After Hours
Chart (2026)	Peak position
Australian Albums (ARIA)	88
Australian Jazz & Blues Albums (ARIA)	1
US Top Jazz Albums (Billboard)	18
US Traditional Jazz Albums (Billboard)	14
