= Songwriter (Richard Marx album) =

Studio album by Richard Marx
- Released: September 30, 2022
- Genres: Pop; rock; country
- Length: 69:54
- Label: BMG
- Producers: Richard Marx; Lucas Marx; Jesse Marx; Bruce Wiegner; Matt Scannell; Burt Bacharach; CJ Vanston; Adam Messinger; Michael Jade

Richard Marx chronology
Stories to Tell: Greatest Hits and More (2021)	Songwriter (2022)	After Hours (2026)

Singles from Songwriter
- 1. "Just Go" Released: February 14, 2013; 2. "Same Heartbreak, Different Day" Released: July 15, 2022; 3. "One Day Longer" Released: August 12, 2022; 4. "Shame On You" Released: September 1, 2022; 5. "Believe In Me" Released: 2023

Songwriter is the thirteenth studio album by American singer/songwriter and record producer/arranger Richard Marx, released on September 30, 2022. The debut single "Same Heartbreak, Different Day" peaked at number 15 on the US Billboard Adult Contemporary chart.

== Background ==
Songwriter features songs in the genres pop, rock and country, as well as ballads. For this album, Marx worked with many other songwriters, including his sons Lucas and Jesse, Keith Urban, Darius Rucker, Burt Bacharach, Richard Page, and Chris Daughtry among others.

== Track listing ==
Songwriter track listing
No.	Title	Writer(s)	Length
1.	"Same Heartbreak, Different Day"	Richard Marx; Lucas Marx; Michael Jade	3:08
2.	"Only a Memory"	R. Marx; Adam Messinger	3:00
3.	"Anything"	R. Marx; Bruce Wiegner	2:37
4.	"Moscow Calling"	R. Marx	4:52
5.	"Believe in Me"	R. Marx; L. Marx	3:13
6.	"Shame on You"	R. Marx; Jesse Marx	2:31
7.	"My Love, My Enemy"	R. Marx; Matt Scannell	2:35
8.	"Just Go"	R. Marx	4:17
9.	"One More Yesterday"	R. Marx; Chris Daughtry; Jason Wade	3:22
10.	"We Are Not Alone"	R. Marx; J. Marx	3:44
11.	"Everything I've Got"	R. Marx	3:12
12.	"Misery Loves Company"	R. Marx; L. Marx; Wiegner	2:56
13.	"One Day Longer"	R. Marx; Keith Urban	4:07
14.	"Breaking My Heart"	R. Marx; Darius Rucker; David Hodges	3:46
15.	"We Had It All"	R. Marx; Randy Houser; Brice Long	3:23
16.	"Always"	R. Marx; Burt Bacharach	3:41
17.	"Still in My Heart"	R. Marx; Richard Page	4:11
18.	"Maybe"	R. Marx	4:15
19.	"As If We'll Never Love Again"	R. Marx; Gary Burr	3:23
20.	"Never After"	R. Marx; Topher Brown	3:41
Total length:			69:54

== Personnel ==
- Richard Marx – lead vocals, backing vocals (1–5, 7–9, 11–15), acoustic guitar (2, 3, 11, 13, 15, 18, 20), keyboards (4, 8, 14, 18), all guitars (4), bass (4), acoustic piano (7, 19), ganjo (13)
- Lucas Marx – all instruments (1, 5), answer vocals (3)
- Adam Messinger – all instruments (2)
- Bruce Wiegner – all instruments (3), all other instruments (12)
- Jesse Marx – all other instruments (6), backing vocals (6, 10), all instruments (10)
- Jason Webb – keyboards (15)
- Greg Phillinganes – acoustic piano (16)
- CJ Vanston – all instruments (17)
- Matt Scannell – guitars (7), bass (7, 14), "verse" guitar (14), guitar solo (14)
- Jerry McPherson – guitars (8, 11–13, 15), additional guitars (14)
- Michael Landau – guitars (9), electric guitar (20), electric guitar solo (20)
- Jason Blynn – electric guitar (18)
- Mark Hill – bass (8, 11, 13, 15)
- Paul Bushnell – bass (9, 20)
- Whynot Jansveld – bass (18)
- Matt Walker – drums (4)
- Taylor Hawkins – drums (6)
- Brian Griffin – drums (7)
- Shawn Fichter – drums (8)
- Josh Freese – drums (9)
- Steve Brewster – drums (11, 13–15)
- Miles McPherson – drums (12)
- Herman Matthews – drums (20)
- Nina DiGregorio – violin solo (4)
- Michael Omartian – string arrangements (16)
- Cliff Colnot – string arrangements (19)
- Jillian Jacqueline – harmony vocals (20)

=== Production ===
- Lucas Marx – producer (1, 5), mixing (1, 5)
- Michael Jade – additional production (1)
- Adam Messinger – producer (2), mixing (2)
- Bruce Wiegner – producer (3, 12), mixing (3)
- Richard Marx – producer (4, 6–11, 13–16, 18–20), liner notes
- Matt Scannell – producer (6, 7)
- Jesse Marx – producer (10)
- Burt Bacharach – producer (16)
- CJ Vanston – producer (17), mixing (17)
- Matthew Prock – engineer (4), mixing (4, 6, 10, 12, 18, 19), mastering (6–15)
- Chip Matthews – mixing (7, 8, 11, 13–16, 20)
- Jorge Vivo – recording (19)
- Whynot Jansveld – mastering (1–5, 16–20)
- Dale Voleker – design
- Nick Spanos – photography
- Daisy Fuentes – photo of Richard Marx (pg. 14)

== Charts ==
Chart performance for Songwriter
Chart (2022)	Peak position
Australian Digital Albums (ARIA)	5
Australian Physical Albums (ARIA)	87
German Albums (Offizielle Top 100)	95
Scottish Albums (Official Charts)	28
Swiss Albums (Schweizer Hitparade)	68
UK Album Downloads (Official Charts)	29
UK Independent Albums (Official Charts)	11
