= Children of the Night (Richard Marx song) =

Single by Richard Marx

from the album Repeat Offender
- B-side: "Real World"
- Released: 1990
- Recorded: 1989
- Genre: Soft rock
- Length: 4:43 (album version); 4:10 (single version)
- Songwriter: Richard Marx
- Producers: Richard Marx; David Cole

Richard Marx singles chronology
"Too Late to Say Goodbye" (1990)	"Children of the Night" (1990)	"Keep Coming Back" (1991)

"Children of the Night" is a song written and recorded by Richard Marx, issued as the sixth and final single from his second album Repeat Offender. The song peaked at #13 on the Billboard Hot 100 in 1990, and was written in support of the suburban Los Angeles (Van Nuys)-based organization for runaways. It also features Marx's father Dick Marx on horn arrangements.

== Composition ==
In a 2018 interview with Songfacts, Marx said:

I was in a hotel room on tour, and I was watching 60 Minutes. There was a piece on this woman, Dr Lois Lee, who created the Children of the Night foundation, and I was just riveted by the story. The next day, I had my manager reach out to Dr Lee. We got on the phone, and I said, "I want to help. I also think that there is a song here. But I can't remotely write this without really researching it." So, when I got off the road, she connected me with three or four of the kids that had been sheltered by the foundation, and had been on the streets – had been prostitutes, drug addicts, in rehab – and had their lives together. I spent a couple of days just hanging out with these kids, and they were very generous with telling me what their lives had been like. So, I wrote the lyric based upon the conversations I had with these kids. And immediately, I knew the only right thing to do was to make all of the proceeds from the song go to the foundation. Luckily, the song was a pretty big hit, and the money generated from it built a whole new shelter in Los Angeles, and I continue to support them to this day.

== Track listing ==
All songs written Richard Marx and produced by Marx and David Cole.

1. "Children of the Night" – 4:10
2. "Real World" [Live at The Palace Theatre] – 4:12

== Personnel ==
- Richard Marx – lead and backing vocals
- Michael Omartian – keyboards, acoustic piano
- C.J. Vanston – keyboards
- Michael Landau – guitars, guitar solo
- Randy Jackson – bass
- Prairie Prince – drums
- Paulinho da Costa – percussion
- Tom Scott – sax solo
- Larry Williams – saxophones
- Gary Grant – trumpet
- Jerry Hey – trumpet
- Dick Marx – horn arrangements
- Shelley Cole – backing vocals
- Kevin Cronin – backing vocals
- Larry Gatlin – backing vocals
- Rudy Gatlin – backing vocals
- Steve Gatlin – backing vocals
- Ruth Marx – backing vocals
- Gene Miller – backing vocals
- Cynthia Rhodes – backing vocals
- Don Shelton – backing vocals
- Terry Williams – backing vocals
- The Children of the Night – choir

== Charts ==
=== Weekly charts ===
Chart (1990)	Peak position
Europe (Eurochart Hot 100)	91
US Billboard Hot 100	13
US Billboard Adult Contemporary	6

=== Year-end charts ===
Chart (1990)	Position
Canada Top Singles (RPM)	44
