= Another One Down =

2019 song by Richard Marx

Single by Richard Marx

from the album Limitless
- Released: July 1, 2019
- Length: 3:12
- Label: BMG Rights Management
- Songwriters: Richard Marx; Lucas Marx
- Producer: Lucas Marx

Richard Marx singles chronology
"Dance with My Father" (2018)	"Another One Down" (2019)	"Let Go" (2019)

Music video
- "Another One Down" on YouTube

"Another One Down" is a song recorded and written by American singer-songwriter Richard Marx. It was released on July 1, 2019 by BMG Rights Management, from his twelfth studio album Limitless. The song was produced by his son Lucas Marx.

== Music video ==
The music video was released on October 12, 2019. Pop Dose commented that the video "finds Marx found doing what Cher wished she could have done for ages, turn back time".

== Chart performance ==
The song reached No. 14 on the Billboard Adult Contemporary chart, becoming his highest-peaking non-holiday hit on the chart since 1997.

== Charts ==
=== Weekly charts ===
Chart (2019)	Peak position
US Adult Contemporary (Billboard)	14

=== Year-end charts ===
Chart (2019)	Position
US Adult Contemporary (Billboard)	35
Chart (2020)	Position
US Adult Contemporary (Billboard)	46
