= Standard Time, Vol. 3: The Resolution of Romance =

Studio album by Wynton Marsalis
- Released: May 15, 1990
- Genre: Jazz
- Length: 73:54
- Label: Columbia
- Producer: George Butler, Delfeayo Marsalis

Wynton Marsalis chronology
Crescent City Christmas Card (1989)	Standard Time, Vol. 3: The Resolution of Romance (1990)	Tune in Tomorrow (1990)

Standard Time, Vol. 3: The Resolution of Romance is an album by Wynton Marsalis, released in 1990. The album reached peak positions of number 101 on the Billboard 200 and number 1 on the Billboard Top Jazz Albums chart.

== Reception ==
Professional ratings
Review scores
Source	Rating
AllMusic	3/5 stars
The Encyclopedia of Popular Music	3/5 stars
The Penguin Guide to Jazz Recordings	3.5/4 stars
The Rolling Stone Album Guide	4/5 stars

In a review for AllMusic, Scott Yanow wrote: "Wynton, perhaps because of his father's presence, is very respectful of the melodies, sometimes overly so. The result is that this set is not as adventurous as one would like although Marsalis's beautiful tone makes the music worth hearing."

The authors of The Penguin Guide to Jazz Recordings noted that the album "consistently surprises," and stated: "Marsalis... is in reflective mood throughout, relying on soft, almost sotto voce harmony effects and a wonderfully lachrymose wah-wah on 'The Seductress'."

Jack Fuller of the Chicago Tribune called the album "a fine example of the trumpeter`s growth," and remarked: "His style is spare and lyrical... The solos, too, emphasize melodic quality and expressiveness over flash."

Writing for Burning Ambulance, Phil Freeman commented: "The album's cover depicts Wynton Marsalis gazing admiringly at his father as the older man plays piano, and that's the dominant mood here... Ellis Marsalis has a somewhat regal piano style, placing his notes with great care and never cutting loose. This in turn keeps his son somewhat restrained, and the rhythm section follows their lead."

== Track listing ==
No.	Title	Writer(s)	Length
1.	"In the Court of King Oliver"	Wynton Marsalis	4:31
2.	"Never Let Me Go"	Ray Evans, Jay Livingston	1:46
3.	"Street of Dreams"	Sam M. Lewis, Victor Young	4:07
4.	"Where or When"	Richard Rodgers, Lorenz Hart	2:50
5.	"Bona and Paul"	Wynton Marsalis	1:46
6.	"The Seductress"	Wynton Marsalis	2:55
7.	"A Sleepin' Bee"	Harold Arlen, Truman Capote	3:15
8.	"Big Butter and Egg Man"	Louis Armstrong, Percy Venable	4:45
9.	"The Very Thought of You"	Ray Noble	5:36
10.	"I Cover the Waterfront"	Johnny Green, Edward Heyman	4:52
11.	"How Are Things in Glocca Morra?"	Yip Harburg, Burton Lane	2:57
12.	"My Romance"	Richard Rodgers, Lorenz Hart	1:50
13.	"Everything Happens to Me"	Tom Adair, Matt Dennis	5:04
14.	"Flamingo"	Edmund Anderson, Ted Grouya	3:21
15.	"You're My Everything"	Mort Dixon, Harry Warren, Joe Young	3:25
16.	"Skylark"	Hoagy Carmichael, Johnny Mercer	2:56
17.	"It's Easy to Remember"	Richard Rodgers, Lorenz Hart	4:06
18.	"Taking a Chance on Love"	Vernon Duke, Ted Fetter, John La Touche	3:50
19.	"I Gotta Right to Sing the Blues"	Harold Arlen, Ted Koehler	5:00
20.	"In the Wee Small Hours of the Morning"	Bob Hilliard, David Mann	1:56
21.	"It's Too Late Now"	Burton Lane, Alan Jay Lerner	2:55

== Personnel ==
- Wynton Marsalis – trumpet, vocals
- Ellis Marsalis Jr. – piano
- Reginald Veal – bass
- Herlin Riley – drums

Technical

- George Butler – executive producer
- Delfeayo Marsalis – producer
- Stanley Crouch – liner notes
