= Emotional Remains =

Studio album by Richard Marx
- Released: October 31, 2008
- Recorded: Renegade Studio; Area 44
- Genres: Rock; hard rock
- Length: 46:35; 56:15 (Amazon)
- Label: Zanzibar Records
- Producers: Richard Marx; Matt Scannell

Richard Marx chronology
Duo (2008)	Emotional Remains (2008)	Sundown (2008)

Alternative cover
- Amazon release cover

Emotional Remains is the eighth studio album by Richard Marx, released digitally on October 31, 2008, on Marx's website. Emotional Remains was released simultaneously with Sundown and was re-released exclusively through Amazon on September 22, 2009, with two new tracks.

Unlike his previous work that largely featured adult contemporary music, Emotional Remains had a "clear hard-rock edge" which Marx attributed to his frequent listening to bands like the Foo Fighters, Lifehouse, and Nickelback.

== Track listing ==
All tracks are written by and produced by Richard Marx, except where noted.

Standard release
No.	Title	Writer(s)	Producer(s)	Length
1.	"From the Inside"			4:35
2.	"Better or Worse"			4:48
3.	"Part of Me"	Marx; Matt Scannell		4:14
4.	"Through My Veins"			4:42
5.	"Save Me"			3:49
6.	"Come Running"	Marx; Fee Waybill		4:18
7.	"Flame in Your Fire"	Marx; Randall Wallace		4:09
8.	"When November Falls"	Marx; Scannell	Marx; Scannell	4:32
9.	"Take You Back"	Marx; Graham Colton		3:42
10.	"Over My Head"			3:55
11.	"Done to Me"			3:47
Total length:				46:35

Amazon exclusive bonus tracks
No.	Title	Length
12.	"Never Take Me Dancing"	5:14
13.	"Should've Known Better 2009"	4:26
Total length:		56:15

== Personnel ==
- Greg Bissonette – drums
- Steve Brewster – drums
- Tom Bukovac – guitars
- Cliff Colnot – string arrangements
- J.T. Corenflos – guitars
- Bruce Gaitsch – guitars
- Jennifer Hanson – backing vocals
- Mark Hill – bass guitar
- Sean Hurley – bass guitar
- Michael Landau – guitars
- Teddy Landau – bass guitar
- Kenny Loggins – producer, guitars, backing vocals
- Kevin Marks – guitars
- Brandon Marx – backing vocals
- Richard Marx – producer, arrangements, lead and backing vocals, acoustic and electric guitars, keyboards, synth bass, clavinet
- Chip Matthews – guitars
- Jerry McPherson – guitars
- Nate Morton – drums
- Matt Pierson – bass guitar
- Matt Scannell – producer, guitars, backing vocals
- Gary Smith – keyboards
- Michael Thompson – guitars
- Matt Walker – drums
- Jason Webb – keyboards
- Glenn Worf – bass guitar

Production

- David Cole – engineer
- Chip Matthews – engineer
- Mat Prock – engineer
- Jamie Sickora – engineer
- Mark Valentine – engineer

== Miscellaneous ==
- This is Marx's first studio album to not feature him on the album cover, Marx took the photo himself
- This is Marx's first studio album to not have released a single
- Son Brandon Marx makes an appearance on the track "Save Me"
- There is no personal dedication listed on this album
- The track "Take You Back" was previously released on Graham Colton's 2007 album Here Right Now
- "Never Take Me Dancing" is a remake of "You Never Take Me Dancing" from Marx's 1997 Flesh And Bone album
- "Should've Known Better 2009" is a remake of "Should've Known Better" from Marx's 1987 Richard Marx album
