= Too Late to Say Goodbye (song) =

Single by Richard Marx

from the album Repeat Offender
- B-side: "Real World"
- Released: January 7, 1990
- Recorded: 1988
- Genre: Hard rock; heavy metal
- Length: 4:57
- Label: EMI
- Composer: Richard Marx
- Lyricists: Richard Marx; Fee Waybill
- Producers: Richard Marx; David N. Cole

Richard Marx singles chronology
"Angelia" (1989)	"Too Late to Say Goodbye" (1990)	"Children of the Night" (1990)

"Too Late to Say Goodbye" is a song composed by American musician Richard Marx. The lyrics were written by Marx and Fee Waybill, who performs background vocals. It was released in 1990 as the fifth single from his second studio album Repeat Offender. "Too Late to Say Goodbye" peaked at No. 12 on both the Billboard Hot 100 and the Album Rock Tracks chart, and reached No. 47 on the Adult Contemporary chart.

Compared to his other hits, which are mostly pop and soft rock, this song takes a more aggressive, hard-rocking direction, showcasing a heavier sound and increased intensity.

== Music video ==
The music video is directed by Jim Yukich, who previously directed the music video for "Right Here Waiting".

== Personnel ==
- Richard Marx – lead vocals, backing vocals
- C. J. Vanston – keyboards
- Michael Landau – electric guitar, guitar solo
- Bruce Gaitsch – acoustic guitar, guitar outro
- Jim Cliff – bass
- Prairie Prince – drums
- Fee Waybill – backing vocals

== Charts ==
=== Weekly charts ===
Chart (1990)	Peak position
Australia (ARIA)	99
Canada Top Singles (RPM)	8
Netherlands (Single Top 100)	76
UK Singles (Official Charts)	38
US Billboard Hot 100	12
US Mainstream Rock (Billboard)	12
US Adult Contemporary (Billboard)	47
West Germany (GfK)	53

=== Year-end charts ===
Chart (1990)	Position
Canada Top Singles (RPM)	83
