= Sundown (Richard Marx album) =

Studio album by Richard Marx
- Released: October 31, 2008
- Studios: Renegade Studio; Area 44; Blackbird Studios
- Genre: Soft rock
- Length: 57:21
- Label: Zanzibar Records
- Producers: Richard Marx; Dann Huff

Richard Marx chronology
Emotional Remains (2008)	Sundown (2008)	The Music of Richard Marx: 1987–2009 (2009)

Sundown is the ninth studio album by singer-songwriter and producer Richard Marx, released digitally on October 31, 2008, simultaneously with Emotional Remains. Featuring songs about romance, Sundown includes tracks such as "Suddenly", a duet with Toni Braxton which Marx wrote, and "And I Love Her" which he recorded with Vince Gill.

This CD was never released as a commercial product; it was only available on Marx's personal website for a limited time.

== Track listing ==
All tracks are written by Richard Marx, except where noted.

No.	Title	Writer(s)	Length
1.	"Have a Little Faith"		4:45
2.	"First Time Ever I Saw Your Face"	Ewan MacColl	4:30
3.	"Suddenly" (duet with Toni Braxton)		4:44
4.	"To My Senses"		4:56
5.	"Wild Horses"	Jagger–Richards	6:06
6.	"Loved"		3:39
7.	"Can't Stop Crying"		4:16
8.	"And I Love Her" (duet with Vince Gill)	Lennon–McCartney	3:34
9.	"Always on Your Mind"	Marx; Matt Scannell	4:57
10.	"In This All Alone"		3:26
11.	"Everything I Want"		5:23
12.	"Ordinary Love"	Sade Adu; Stuart Matthewman	7:08
Total length:			57:21

== Album credits ==
=== Personnel ===
- Greg Bissonette – drums
- Steve Brewster – drums
- Tom Bukovac – guitars
- Cliff Colnot – string arrangements
- J.T. Corenflos – guitars
- Bruce Gaitsch – guitars
- Mark Hill – bass guitar
- Steve Hornbreak – keyboards
- Dann Huff – guitars, producer
- Sean Hurley – bass guitar
- Michael Landau – guitars
- Kevin Marks – electric guitar
- Richard Marx – producer, arrangements, lead and background vocals, acoustic guitar, funk guitar, gut-string guitar, electric guitar, piano, keyboards, drum programming, synth bass, strings
- Hector Pereira – gut-string guitar
- Randy Pierce – guitars
- Matt Scannell – guitars
- Jimmie Lee Sloas – bass guitar
- Michael Thompson – guitars
- C.J. Vanston – drum programming, synth programming
- Jonathan Yudkin – cello, strings

=== Background vocals ===
- Jessica Andrews
- Richard Marx

=== Engineers ===
- David Cole
- Chip Matthews
- Justin Neibank
- Mat Prock

=== Guest credits ===
- Jessica Andrews
- Toni Braxton
- Cliff Colnot
- Vince Gill
- Matt Scannell

== Miscellaneous ==
- Album marks the first time songs that Marx did not write or co-write appeared on an American release
- This is Marx's first studio album in which Fee Waybill does not contribute as a co-writer
- This is Marx's second studio album to not have released a single
- There is no personal dedication listed on this album
- "Have A Little Faith", "Suddenly" (as a solo track) and "To My Senses" would appear on Beautiful Goodbye, Marx's 2014 release.
