= Satisfied (Richard Marx song) =

1989 single by Richard Marx

Single by Richard Marx

from the album Repeat Offender
- B-side: "Should've Known Better" (live)
- Released: April 1989
- Genre: Rock; pop rock
- Length: 4:12 (album version); 3:58 (single version)
- Label: EMI USA
- Songwriter: Richard Marx
- Producers: Richard Marx; David Cole

Richard Marx singles chronology
"Hold On to the Nights" (1988)	"Satisfied" (1989)	"Right Here Waiting" (1989)

Music video
- "Satisfied" on YouTube

"Satisfied" is a song by American singer-songwriter Richard Marx, released as the lead single from his second album, Repeat Offender (1989). It was Marx's second of three consecutive number-one singles on the US Billboard Hot 100 singles chart and became a top-20 hit in Australia and Canada.

== Critical reception ==
In an ironic review on June 10, 1989, Betty Page, observer of British music newspaper Record Mirror, wondered along with readers why Richard Marx, with all the traits and skills of Bryan Adams, did not become as popular.

== Chart performance ==
"Satisfied" served as the lead single from Richard Marx's second album, Repeat Offender. Heavy radio, video and retail attention led to the single's number-39 debut on the Billboard Hot 100 singles chart during the week of May 6, 1989. The single steadily climbed to the top, reaching number one on the week of June 24, 1989.

== Track listing ==
All songs were written by Richard Marx.

US 7-inch and cassette single

1. "Satisfied" (LP version) – 3:58
2. "Should've Known Better" (live) – 4:57

== Personnel ==
- Richard Marx – lead and backing vocals
- C.J. Vanston – keyboards
- Bill Payne – Hammond B3 organ
- Bruce Gaitsch – guitar
- Michael Landau – guitar, guitar solo
- Randy Jackson – bass
- Mike Baird – drums
- Paulinho da Costa – percussion
- Cynthia Rhodes – backing vocals

== Charts ==
=== Weekly charts ===
Chart (1989)	Peak position
Australia (ARIA)	20
Canada Top Singles (RPM)	2
Europe (Eurochart Hot 100)	73
Italy Airplay (Music & Media)	10
Netherlands (Dutch Top 40)	15
Netherlands (Single Top 100)	25
UK Singles (Official Charts)	52
US Billboard Hot 100	1
US Mainstream Rock (Billboard)	5
Venezuela (UPI)	6
West Germany (GfK)	42

=== Year-end charts ===
Chart (1989)	Position
Australia (ARIA)	64
Canada Top Singles (RPM)	32
US Billboard Hot 100	54

== Release history ==
Region	Date	Format(s)	Label(s)	Ref.
United States	April 1989	7-inch vinyl; cassette	EMI USA	
Japan	April 26, 1989	Mini-CD	EMI USA	
United Kingdom	June 5, 1989	7-inch vinyl; 12-inch vinyl; CD	EMI USA	
