= Angelia (song) =

Single by Richard Marx

from the album Repeat Offender
- B-side: "Endless Summer Nights (Live At The Palace Theatre, Los Angeles, CA)"
- Released: September 1989 (US)
- Recorded: 1988–1989
- Genre: Soft rock
- Length: 5:15 (album version); 4:07 (single version)
- Label: Capitol
- Songwriter: Richard Marx
- Producers: Richard Marx; David Cole

Richard Marx singles chronology
"Nothin' You Can Do About It" (1989)	"Angelia" (1989)	"Too Late to Say Goodbye" (1990)

Music video
- "Angelia" on YouTube

"Angelia" (/ˌeɪndʒəˈliːə/ ayn-jə-LEE-ə) is a ballad recorded by Richard Marx and the fourth released single on his second album, Repeat Offender.

"Angelia" hit number 2 on the US Cash Box singles chart, and number 4 on the US Billboard Hot 100 on December 2, 1989. It was also a top-40 hit in Australia and made the top 50 in the UK. On the Billboard Adult Contemporary chart, "Angelia" peaked at number 2 for several weeks behind the Linda Ronstadt/Aaron Neville duet "Don't Know Much".

== Background ==
When Marx first wrote the song, he had trouble finding the perfect female name for the title. Then during a flight, a flight attendant approached his seat and he noticed her name badge that read "Angelia", and he chose that name for the song's title.

Marx based the sound of "Angelia" on Def Leppard's 1983 album Pyromania and the 1987 album Hysteria. During recordings of "Angelia", engineer and co-producer David Cole, along with Marx, tried to copy the sounds of the guitars and drums that Def Leppard and producer Robert "Mutt" Lange had used on the band's two albums.

During a night out with Def Leppard guitarist Phil Collen, Marx was told that the band attempted to emulate "Angelia" for a song that was to appear on their next album, Adrenalize. The song Def Leppard recorded with "Angelia" in mind was likely the hit "Stand Up (Kick Love Into Motion)".

The production and sound of the song "Angelia" is Marx's favorite from his second album, Repeat Offender. Michael Landau played the guitar solo on the song.

== Music video ==
The music video was directed by Michael Bay and featured actress and model Tawny Fere as Angelia.

== Personnel ==
- Richard Marx – lead and backing vocals
- C. J. Vanston – keyboards, arrangements
- Bruce Gaitsch – guitar
- Michael Landau – guitar, guitar solo
- Jim Cliff – bass
- Prairie Prince – drums
- Marc Russo – saxophone

== Track listing ==
All songs written Richard Marx and produced by Marx and David Cole.

1. "Angelia" – 4:08
2. "Endless Summer Nights" [Live at the Palace Theatre] – 5:44

== Charts ==
=== Weekly charts ===
Weekly chart performance for "Angelia" by Richard Marx
Chart (1989–1990)	Peak position
Australia (ARIA)	32
Belgium (Ultratop 50 Flanders)	18
Canada Top Singles (RPM)	1
Canada Adult Contemporary (RPM)	2
Ireland (IRMA)	13
Italy Airplay (Music & Media)	12
New Zealand (Recorded Music NZ)	16
Switzerland (Schweizer Hitparade)	9
UK Singles (Official Charts)	45
US Billboard Hot 100	4
US Adult Contemporary (Billboard)	2

=== Year-end charts ===
Year-end chart performance for "Angelia" by Richard Marx
Chart (1989)	Position
Canada Top Singles (RPM)	49
Chart (1990)	Position
US Adult Contemporary (Billboard)	31
