= Richard Marx (album) =

Studio album by Richard Marx
- Released: June 15, 1987
- Recorded: October 1986 – February 1987
- Studios: Capitol (Hollywood); Lion Share; Lighthouse Recorders; The Mix Room; Sunset Sound
- Genre: Pop rock
- Length: 45:18
- Labels: Manhattan; EMI
- Producers: Richard Marx; David Cole; Humberto Gatica

Richard Marx chronology
Richard Marx (1987)	Repeat Offender (1989)

Singles from Richard Marx
- 1. "Don't Mean Nothing" Released: May 26, 1987; 2. "Should've Known Better" Released: September 8, 1987; 3. "Endless Summer Nights" Released: January 16, 1988; 4. "Hold On to the Nights" Released: May 3, 1988

Richard Marx is the self-titled debut album by American singer-songwriter Richard Marx, released on June 15, 1987.

Four singles reached the top three of the Billboard Hot 100, including Marx's first number one pop single "Hold On to the Nights" in mid-1988. The album's lead single, "Don't Mean Nothing", hit number 1 on Billboard's Hot Mainstream Rock Tracks chart on July 4, 1987.

== Development ==
In the early 1980s, Richard Marx had started his music career in Los Angeles as a background singer and songwriter for other artists. Marx was determined to become a solo artist, stating that "I didn't want to give my best songs away. "Should've Known Better", for instance, was written three years ago, and whenever I'd play it for an artist I'd get a real good response. It was the song I could've placed the easiest, but I knew that I should be the one to do it. When the deal with Manhattan Records came through early in '86, I put everything else on hold - I saw this album as a challenge to show what I could really do."

Marx's relationship with the label was positive, with Marx stating that "Manhattan Records was behind my writing and my voice... that's all they needed. I wasn't told to go into the studio and write hits; I was told to make an album I believed in. Through trial and error, I came up with a record that feels right and that's me."

The album was co-produced by David Cole, whom Marx enjoyed working with. Cole had previously produced singer-songwriter Bob Seger's album Like a Rock which Marx stated that it "...sounded great. David and I worked closely together on the production to insure that the record had that kind of sound."

Another advantage for Marx was the roster of musicians who played on the album. Marx's manager convinced Eagles' guitarist Joe Walsh to play on the track "Don't Mean Nothing". Two other members of the Eagles, Randy Meisner and Timothy B. Schmit also sang background vocals on that track. Marx was subsequently nominated for a Grammy Award for "Best Rock Vocal Performance - Solo" for "Don't Mean Nothing" in 1988.

Marx wrote the lyrics for all of the songs on his debut, with the exception of "Lonely Heart" and "Remember Manhattan" which were written by Fee Waybill from The Tubes. Marx co-wrote the music for three of the tracks with Bruce Gaitsch, Jim Lang, and Michael Omartian. In the liner notes, Marx dedicated the album to his parents, Ruth and Dick Marx.

== Reception ==
Professional ratings
Review scores
Source	Rating
AllMusic	4/5 stars

Four singles were released from the album, each of them doing well on the charts. Marx's future wife, Cynthia Rhodes, G. W. Bailey, and Fee Waybill appeared in the video for the lead single "Don't Mean Nothing". The album went to number eight on the Billboard charts and spent 86 weeks on that chart. The album was certified triple platinum. In the United Kingdom, the album entered the charts on April 9, 1988, where it stayed for two weeks peaking at number 68.

The album received praise from music critic Stephen Thomas Erlewine of AllMusic, who stated that "Richard Marx's self-titled debut album was a finely crafted record of mainstream pop/rock... Filled with carefully constructed radio-ready tracks, it was no surprise that the album became a huge hit."

== Track listing ==
All tracks are written by Richard Marx, except where noted; all tracks are produced by Richard Marx and David Cole, except where noted.

Side one
No.	Title	Writer(s)	Producer(s)	Length
1.	"Should've Known Better"		Humberto Gatica	4:10
2.	"Don't Mean Nothing"	Marx; Bruce Gaitsch		4:41
3.	"Endless Summer Nights"		Gatica	4:30
4.	"Lonely Heart"	Marx; Fee Waybill		3:53
5.	"Hold On to the Nights"			5:12

Side two
No.	Title	Writer(s)	Producer(s)	Length
6.	"Have Mercy"			4:33
7.	"Remember Manhattan"	Marx; Waybill		4:18
8.	"The Flame of Love"	Marx; Jim Lang		3:37
9.	"Rhythm of Life"	Marx; Michael Omartian		4:44
10.	"Heaven Only Knows"		Gatica	5:40
Total length:				45:18

== Personnel ==
- Richard Marx – lead vocals, backing vocals (1–3, 7, 9), keyboards (4–7), drums (4, 7), acoustic piano (5)
- Tom Keane – keyboards (1, 3, 10)
- Michael Omartian – acoustic piano (2), keyboards (9)
- Rhett Lawrence – keyboards (4, 7), programming (4, 7), drums (4, 7)
- Jim Lang – keyboards (8), drum programming (8)
- Michael Landau – guitar (1, 3, 5, 6, 9, 10), end guitar solo (4), guitar solo (5, 6)
- Bruce Gaitsch – rhythm guitar (2), guitar (3, 6, 7), 1st and 2nd guitar solos (4)
- Joe Walsh – rhythm guitar (2), guitar solo (2)
- John Pierce – bass (1, 10)
- Nathan East – bass (2, 3)
- Patrick O'Hearn – bass (5)
- Joe Chemay – bass (6, 9)
- Prairie Prince – drums (1)
- John Keane – drums (2, 3, 6, 9, 10)
- Tris Imboden – drums (5)
- Paulinho da Costa – percussion (1, 3–5, 10)
- Alex Acuña – percussion (8)
- Dave Koz – saxophone (3, 7, 10)
- Fee Waybill – backing vocals (1, 7)
- Timothy B. Schmit – backing vocals (2)
- Randy Meisner – backing vocals (2)
- Karyn White – backing vocals (6)
- Ruth Marx – backing vocals (9)
- Cynthia Rhodes – backing vocals (9)
- Horns on "Rhythm of Life" – Jerry Hey, Bill Reichenbach, Jr., Gary Grant and Larry Williams; Arranged by Michael Omartian, Richard Marx and Jerry Hey
- "Get Lost" Chorus on "Rhythm of Life – Ruth Marx, Cynthia Rhodes, Richard Marx, Terry Williams, Dean Pitchford, Bobby Colomby, Peter Doell, DeWayne Brady, Dick Marx, Loretta Munoz, Ross and Anne Schwartz, Susanne Christian, Susanne Edgren, Brittney Cole and Julie Landau

== Production ==
- All songs arranged by Richard Marx, except track 1 (Marx and Tom Keane), tracks 4 and 7 (Marx, Rhett Lawrence), track 8 (Jim Lang) and track 10 (Marx and the band).
- Tracks 1, 3 and 10 produced by Humberto Gatica for Hum Productions, Inc. Recorded and mixed by Humberto Gatica, with additional recording by David Cole. "Should've Known Better" remixed by David Cole.
- All other tracks produced by Richard Marx and David Cole. Recorded and mixed by David Cole.
- Second Engineers – Peter Doell, Karen Siegel, Judy Clapp, Sam Ramos, Stephen Shelton, Jimmy Preziosi.
- Mastered by Wally Traugott
- Production Coordination – Susanne Marie Edgren
- Creative Director – Ken Baumstein
- Art Direction – Paula Scher
- Design – Anthony Sellari
- Photography – Nels Isrealson
- Clothes – American Rags
  - "Should've Known Better", "Endless Summer Nights", "Hold on to the Nights", Heaven Only Knows" and "Have Mercy" published by Chi-Boy Music.
  - "Don't Mean Nothing" and "The Flame of Love" published by Chi-Boy Music and Edge of Fluke Music.
  - "Rhythm of Life" published by Chi-Boy Music and See This House Music.
  - "Remember Manhattan" and "Lonely Heart" published by Chi-Boy Music and Fee Songs.

== Charts ==
=== Weekly charts ===
Chart (1988)	Peak position
Australian Albums (ARIA)	7
Canada Top Albums/CDs (RPM)	23
New Zealand Albums (RMNZ)	45
Swedish Albums (Sverigetopplistan)	34
UK Albums (Official Charts)	68
US Billboard 200	8

=== Year-end charts ===
Chart (1988)	Position
Australia (ARIA Charts)	34
Canada Top Albums/CDs (RPM)	82
US Billboard 200	8

== Certifications ==
Region	Certification	Certified units/sales
Australia (ARIA)	Gold	35,000^{^}
Canada (Music Canada)	Platinum	100,000^{^}
United States (RIAA)	3× Platinum	3,000,000^{^}
^{^} Shipments figures based on certification alone.
