= Hold On to the Nights =

Single by Richard Marx

from the album Richard Marx
- B-side: "Lonely Heart"
- Released: May 3, 1988
- Genre: Pop rock; soft rock
- Length: 5:12 (album version); 4:34 (LP edit); 4:23 (AC edit)
- Label: EMI
- Songwriter: Richard Marx
- Producers: Richard Marx; David Cole

Richard Marx singles chronology
"Endless Summer Nights" (1988)	"Hold On to the Nights" (1988)	"Satisfied" (1989)

Music video
- "Hold On to the Nights" on YouTube

Audio sample
- file; help

"Hold On to the Nights" is a power ballad written and performed by American rock singer/songwriter/musician Richard Marx. This was the fourth and final single released from his self-titled debut album, and his first to reach number one on the US Billboard Hot 100 chart. The song has been re-released on numerous albums and is included on Marx's live performance DVD A Night Out with Friends (2012).

== Release ==
"Hold On to the Nights" reached the Billboard Hot 100 number 1 position on July 23, 1988, preventing Def Leppard's "Pour Some Sugar on Me" from reaching the top spot that same week. The song was on the chart for twenty-one weeks, and left the chart at number 91. The song also reached at number three on the Billboard Adult Contemporary chart.

== Chart performance ==
=== Charts ===
Chart (1988)	Peak position
Australia (ARIA)	70
Canada Adult Contemporary (RPM)	3
Canada Top Singles (RPM)	6
UK Singles (Official Charts)	60
US Billboard Hot 100	1
US Cashbox Top 100	3
US Billboard Hot Adult Contemporary Tracks	3
Billboard Year-End Hot 100 singles	24

== Personnel ==
- Richard Marx – vocals, keyboards, acoustic piano
- Michael Landau – guitars, guitar solo
- Patrick O'Hearn – bass
- Tris Imboden – drums
- Paulinho da Costa – percussion

== Other performances ==
Marx appeared as lounge singer/piano player Buddy Daquiri in the "Poison Fire Teats Universe" episode of the TV series Life in Pieces in 2017, in which he played the song on the piano while whistling.
