= Right Here Waiting =

1989 single by Richard Marx

Single by Richard Marx

from the album Repeat Offender
- B-side: "Wait for the Sunrise"
- Released: June 21, 1989
- Studio: Magic Record (Salt Lake City, Utah)
- Genre: Soft rock
- Length: 4:06 (UK 45 Version); 4:28 (Album/Single Version)
- Label: EMI
- Songwriter: Richard Marx
- Producers: Richard Marx; David Cole

Richard Marx singles chronology
"Satisfied" (1989)	"Right Here Waiting" (1989)	"Nothin' You Can Do About It" (1989)

Music video
- "Right Here Waiting" on YouTube

"Right Here Waiting" is a song by the American singer and songwriter Richard Marx. It was released on June 21, 1989, as the second single from his second album, Repeat Offender (1989). The song was a global hit, topping charts in many countries around the world, including Australia, Canada, Ireland, New Zealand, and the United States where it reached number one on the Billboard Hot 100. The same year, it was certified platinum by the Recording Industry Association of America (RIAA). It was the UK's most streamed love song on Spotify ahead of Valentine's Day in 2013 and has since been covered by many artists, including R&B singer Monica.

== Background and writing ==
Marx wrote "Right Here Waiting" on the road as a love letter to his then-wife, actress Cynthia Rhodes, who was in South Africa shooting a film. It was originally created to be sung by Barbra Streisand, but she refused it.

In a 2021 interview, Marx commented: "I had just recently written 'Right Here Waiting' and it was such a personal song to me at the time that I had no intention of recording it. I was like, 'I'll give Barbra Streisand "Right Here Waiting"; I'm not gonna do anything with it'. I had to messenger the cassette tape of it to her. The next day she called me – I still have this voicemail – and it says, ‘Richard, I heard the song; it’s a beautiful song, but I’m gonna need you to rewrite the lyrics because I’m not gonna be right here waiting for anyone.' She actually did me a solid, because had she not rejected it I probably would never have recorded it and every once in a while I put my arm around her and I say, ‘Thank you so much for rejecting my song!'”

== Critical reception ==
David Nichols of Smash Hits stated that "really, 'Right Here Waiting' is a beautiful ballad with an amazingly catchy tune and—like many other Richard Marx songs—it's destined to become a classic".

== Chart performance ==
"Right Here Waiting" was the second single from Marx's Repeat Offender, after "Satisfied". It entered the US Billboard Hot 100 singles chart at number 44 in the week of July 8, 1989, and became Marx's third consecutive number-one single on August 12, 1989. The record spent three consecutive weeks at number one. The song was Marx's first of several to go to number one on the Adult Contemporary chart. Certified platinum on October 16, 1989, "Right Here Waiting" became Marx's best-selling single. The song also reached number one on the Radio & Records CHR/Pop Airplay chart on August 4, 1989, remaining on the top of the chart for three weeks. In the United Kingdom, the song was released in August 1989 and peaked at number two.

== Music video ==
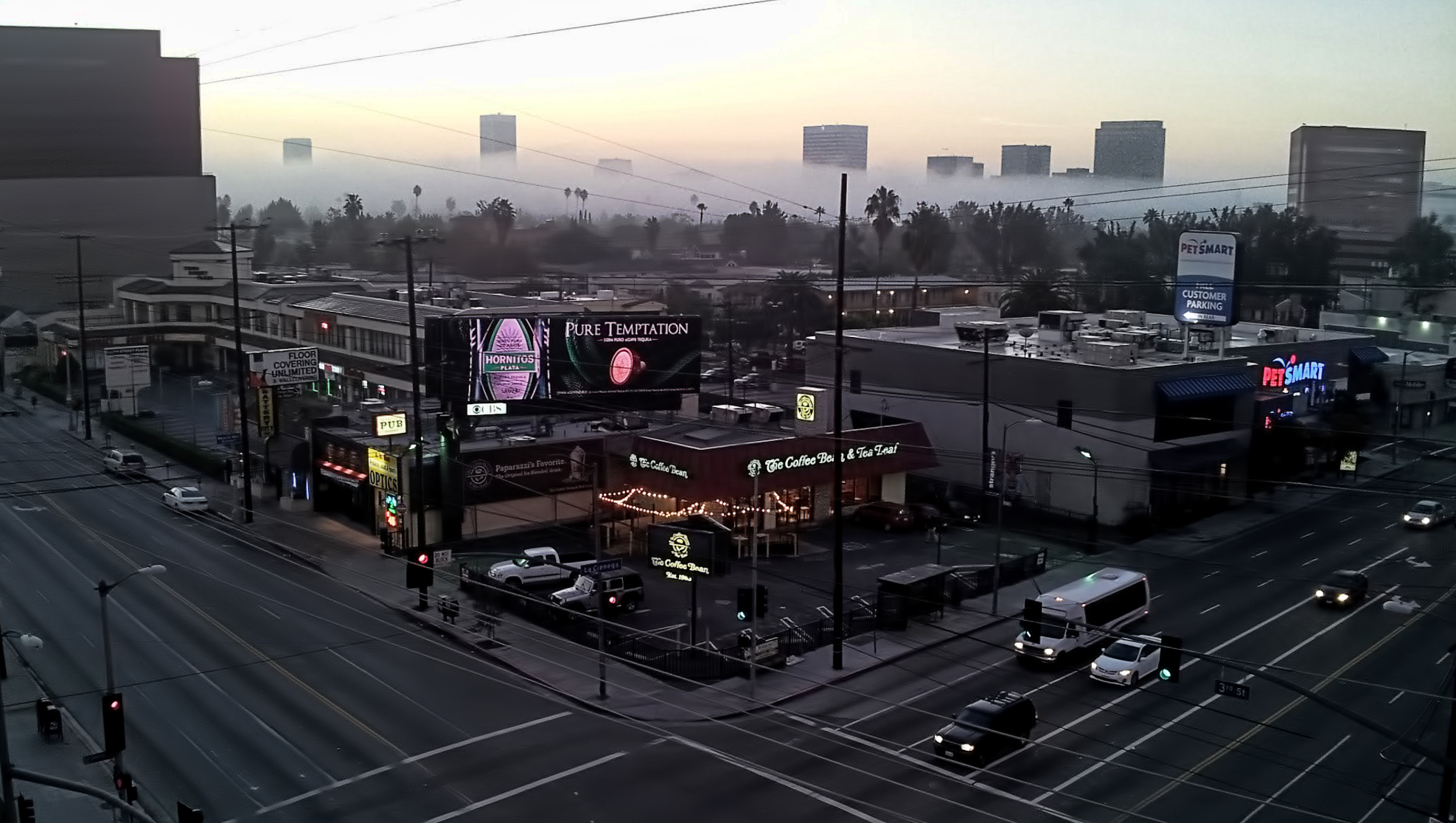
The music video for "Right Here Waiting" was filmed in various locations throughout Los Angeles.

The video for this song was directed by Jim Yukich, and produced by Paul Flattery. It appears to be filmed on the road during Marx's 1989 Repeat Offender Tour, but was all shot in Los Angeles. It features various black-and-white tour footage interspersed with color scenes of Marx playing the song to an empty auditorium with a grand piano at a (staged) soundcheck. Due to Marx's hectic touring schedule, very little time was available to produce a video for this single, so other tour footage was compiled to make an official video for the track.

== Track listings ==
CD single

1. "Right Here Waiting"
2. "Hold on to the Nights" (live)
3. "That Was Lulu" (live)
4. "Wild Life"

Cassette

1. "Right Here Waiting" — 4:28
2. "Wait for the Sunrise" — 4:13
3. "Right Here Waiting" — 4:28
4. "Wait for the Sunrise" — 4:13

7-inch single

1. "Right Here Waiting" — 4:28
2. "Wait for the Sunrise" — 4:13

Mini-CD single

1. "Right Here Waiting" — 4:28
2. "Wait for the Sunrise" — 4:13
3. "Hold on to the Nights" (live at the Palace Theatre, Los Angeles, California) — 4:48

== Credits and personnel ==
- Bruce Gaitsch – electric guitar, classical guitar solo
- Richard Marx – producer, vocals, writer
- C. J. Vanston – keyboards

== Charts ==
=== Weekly charts ===
Weekly chart performance for "Right Here Waiting"
Chart (1989–2022)	Peak position
Australia (ARIA)	1
Austria (Ö3 Austria Top 40)	19
Belgium (Ultratop 50 Flanders)	3
Canada Retail Singles (The Record)	1
Canada Top Singles (RPM)	1
Canada Adult Contemporary (RPM)	1
France (SNEP)	19
Ireland (IRMA)	1
Italy Airplay (Music & Media)	1
Luxembourg (Radio Luxembourg)	1
Netherlands (Dutch Top 40)	3
Netherlands (Single Top 100)	4
New Zealand (Recorded Music NZ)	1
Norway (VG-lista)	4
Poland Airplay (ZPAV)	89
Portugal (AFYVE)	2
Spain (AFYVE)	17
Sweden (Sverigetopplistan)	7
Switzerland (Schweizer Hitparade)	6
UK Singles (Official Charts)	2
UK Airplay (Music & Media)	3
US Billboard Hot 100	1
US Adult Contemporary (Billboard)	1
US CHR/Pop Airplay (Radio & Records)	1
West Germany (GfK)	12

=== Year-end charts ===
Year-end chart performance for "Right Here Waiting"
Chart (1989)	Position
Australia (ARIA)	14
Belgium (Ultratop)	13
Canada Top Singles (RPM)	2
European Hot 100 Singles	40
Netherlands (Dutch Top 40)	15
Netherlands (Single Top 100)	23
New Zealand (RIANZ)	35
UK Singles (OCC)	30
US Billboard Hot 100	11
US Adult Contemporary (Billboard)	6

== Certifications ==
Certifications for "Right Here Waiting"
Region	Certification	Certified units/sales
Australia (ARIA)	Platinum	70,000^{^}
Canada (Music Canada)	Gold	50,000^{^}
Denmark (IFPI Danmark)	Gold	45,000^{‡}
New Zealand (RMNZ)	Platinum	30,000^{‡}
Spain (Promusicae)	Gold	30,000^{‡}
United Kingdom (BPI)	Gold	400,000^{‡}
United States (RIAA)	Platinum	1,000,000^{^}
^{^} Shipments figures based on certification alone.^{‡} Sales+streaming figures based on certification alone.

== Monica version ==
"Right Here Waiting"

Single by Monica featuring 112

from the album The Boy Is Mine
- Released: November 30, 1999
- Genre: R&B
- Length: 4:29
- Label: Arista
- Songwriter: Richard Marx
- Producer: David Foster

Monica singles chronology
"Street Symphony" (1999)	"Right Here Waiting" (1999)	"I've Got to Have It" (2000)

112 singles chronology
"Love You Like I Did" (1999)	"Right Here Waiting" (1999)	"Your Letter" (2000)

Audio
- "Right Here Waiting" on YouTube

"Right Here Waiting" was covered by American singer Monica along with R&B group 112. It was released only in the United States in November 1999 as the fifth and final single from her second studio album, The Boy Is Mine (1998). Produced by Canadian musician David Foster, "Right Here Waiting" peaked at number 32 on the Billboard's US Adult R&B Songs chart.

=== Background ===
Monica and 112's version of "Right Here Waiting" was produced by David Foster. A personal favorite of Monica, the singer asked Foster to recreate it for her second studio album, The Boy Is Mine (1998). According to Monica, Foster was surprised to hear that a young girl of her age was listening to Richard Marx music. Her vocal performance on "Right Here Waiting" was inspired by a conversation that she had with Foster's wife Linda Thompson during the recording of the song.

=== Credits and personnel ===
Credits adapted from the liner notes of The Boy Is Mine.

- 112 – lead vocals
- Felipe Elgueta – recording engineer
- David Foster – keyboards, producer, strings arranger
- Humberto Gatica – recording engineer
- Richard Marx – writer
- Tony Maserati – additional producer
- Monica – lead vocals, vocal arranger
- William Ross – strings arranger
- Michael Thompson – guitar
- Glen Woodward – synthesizer progammer

=== Charts ===
Weekly chart performance for "Right Here Waiting"
Chart (2000)	Peak position
US Adult R&B Songs (Billboard)	32

=== Release history ===
Release dates and formats for "Right Here Waiting"
Region	Date	Format	Label(s)	Ref.
United States	November 30, 1999	Urban adult contemporary radio	Arista	
United States	December 14, 1999	Urban contemporary radio	Arista	

== See also ==
- List of Billboard Hot 100 number ones of 1989
- List of Hot Adult Contemporary number ones of 1989
