= Endless Summer Nights =

Single by Richard Marx

from the album Richard Marx
- B-side: "Have Mercy"
- Released: January 16, 1988
- Recorded: 1986
- Genre: Soft rock
- Length: 4:30 (album version); 4:11 (7-inch single edit)
- Label: Manhattan
- Songwriter: Richard Marx
- Producers: Richard Marx; Humberto Gatica

Richard Marx singles chronology
"Should've Known Better" (1987)	"Endless Summer Nights" (1988)	"Hold On to the Nights" (1988)

Music video
- "Endless Summer Nights" on YouTube

"Endless Summer Nights" is a song performed by the American rock singer Richard Marx, released in January 1988 as the third single from his debut album Richard Marx. The song peaked at No. 2 on the U.S. pop and Adult Contemporary charts.

== Background and composition ==
"Endless Summer Nights" was a track from Marx's original demo tapes. It begins with a similar intro beat style as "It Must Have Been Love" by Roxette. The lyrics were inspired by a trip to Hawaii that Marx had taken with his then-girlfriend (and future wife), Cynthia Rhodes. According to Marx, he wrote the song as a theme to summer love that does not last when lovers go their separate ways in the fall. In the liner notes of his 1997 Greatest Hits album, Marx commented on the song: "Aside from replacing synthesized bass with the great Nathan East, this recording is the demo that every record company in the business rejected in 1985 and 1986." Marx eventually signed with EMI-Manhattan Records in 1986.

== Release and reception ==
Released in January 1988 as the third single from his debut solo album, "Endless Summer Nights" entered the U.S. Billboard Hot 100 at No. 53, the highest debut of the week. In March and April, the song reached No. 2, where it stayed for two weeks, behind "Man In The Mirror" by Michael Jackson. The single also peaked at No. 2 on the U.S. Adult Contemporary chart, behind "Never Gonna Give You Up" by Rick Astley. Elsewhere, the single reached No. 13 in Sweden, No. 19 in Australia, No. 42 in New Zealand, No. 50 in the United Kingdom, and No. 62 in the Netherlands. The woman in the music video is French model and actress Myrtille Blervaque (born September 1962), also known by the stage names Blair Valk and Borovnisa Blervaque; she also appeared in Eddie Money's music video for his 1988 top-10 hit "Walk On Water".

== Track listing ==
1. "Endless Summer Nights" [edit] (Marx) – 4:11
2. "Have Mercy" [live at the Palace in L.A.] (Marx) – 5:30

== Credits ==
- Richard Marx – lead and backing vocals
- Tom Keane – keyboards
- Michael Landau – guitar
- Bruce Gaitsch – guitar
- Nathan East – bass
- John Keane – drums
- Paulinho da Costa – percussion
- David Boruff – saxophone

== Chart performance ==
Chart (1988)	Peak position
Australia (Australian Music Report)	16
Canada Top Singles (RPM)	4
Netherlands (Single Top 100)	62
New Zealand (Recorded Music NZ)	42
Sweden (Sverigetopplistan)	13
UK Singles (Official Charts)	50
US Billboard Hot 100	2
US Adult Contemporary	2
US Mainstream Rock	41

=== Year-end charts ===
Chart (1988)	Position
Canada Top Singles (RPM)	44
United States (Billboard)	31
