= Don't Mean Nothing =

Single by Richard Marx

from the album Richard Marx
- B-side: "The Flame of Love"
- Released: May 26, 1987
- Recorded: 1986
- Genre: Blues rock
- Length: 4:41 (album version); 3:59 (7" radio edit); 6:15 (extended rock mix)
- Label: Manhattan
- Songwriters: Richard Marx; Bruce Gaitsch
- Producers: Richard Marx; David Cole

Richard Marx singles chronology
"Don't Mean Nothing" (1987)	"Should've Known Better" (1987)

Music video
- "Don't Mean Nothing" on YouTube

"Don't Mean Nothing" is the debut single by singer/songwriter/producer Richard Marx from his triple-platinum 1987 self-titled debut album. It hit No. 1 on Billboard's Album Rock Tracks chart and No. 3 on the Hot 100. With the chart success of "Don't Mean Nothing" and subsequent singles from his debut album, Marx became the first male artist to reach the top three of the Billboard Hot 100 pop chart with four singles from a debut album. In 1988, Marx was nominated for a Grammy Award for "Best Rock Vocal Performance - Solo" for "Don't Mean Nothing". He competed against Bruce Springsteen, Tina Turner, Bob Seger, and Joe Cocker.

The MTV music video featured Cynthia Rhodes, who would later become Marx's first wife, and actor G.W. Bailey from the Police Academy movies.

== Background and writing ==
According to Marx's personal commentary about the song's origin, his manager at the time asked Joe Walsh to play slide guitar on the song and he agreed. As a fan of the Eagles, Marx felt that musically the song could have belonged on the album The Long Run. Two other Eagles members, Randy Meisner and Timothy B. Schmit, sang background vocals on the song. Marx reportedly wrote the lyrics himself and co-wrote the music with Bruce Gaitsch at his first apartment on Lowry Road in the Los Feliz district of Los Angeles, where Marx resided during the early 1980s.

== Versions ==
There are at least four recorded versions of this song:

- Album version - 4:41
- 7" radio edit version - 3:59
- "Extended Rock Mix" version from 12" single - 6:15
- Live version recorded at the Palace Theatre in Los Angeles, CA, from the "Angelia" 12" single - 8:11

== Personnel ==
- Richard Marx – lead and backing vocals
- Michael Omartian – acoustic piano
- Bruce Gaitsch – rhythm guitar
- Joe Walsh – slide guitar, guitar solo
- Nathan East – bass
- John Keane – drums
- Randy Meisner – backing vocals
- Timothy B. Schmit – backing vocals

== Chart performance ==
As the lead single from Richard Marx, the song saw success on both the Billboard Hot 100 singles and Album Rock Tracks charts. The single entered the Hot 100 chart upon release at number 78 and, 12 weeks later, reached its peak of number 3. The song also became a number-one hit on the Album Rock Tracks chart. In the UK, the song peaked at number 78.

=== Charts ===
Chart (1987–1988)	Peak position
Canada Top Singles (RPM)	8
UK Singles (Official Charts)	78
US Billboard Hot 100	3
US Billboard Album Rock Tracks	1

Year-end chart (1987)	Position
US Top Pop Singles (Billboard)	54
