= Repeat Offender (Richard Marx album) =

1989 studio album by Richard Marx

Studio album by Richard Marx
- Released: April 26, 1989
- Recorded: 1988–89
- Studios: A&M, Hollywood; Capitol, Hollywood; Lion Share, Los Angeles; Cherokee, Hollywood; Sunset Sound, Hollywood
- Genres: Pop rock; adult contemporary
- Length: 49:24
- Label: EMI
- Producers: Richard Marx; David Cole

Richard Marx chronology
Richard Marx (1987)	Repeat Offender (1989)	Rush Street (1991)

Singles from Repeat Offender
- 1. "Satisfied" Released: April 25, 1989; 2. "Right Here Waiting" Released: June 21, 1989; 3. "Nothin' You Can Do About It" Released: July 8, 1989; 4. "Angelia" Released: September 26, 1989; 5. "Too Late to Say Goodbye" Released: January 7, 1990; 6. "Children of the Night" Released: April 17, 1990

Repeat Offender is the second studio album by singer/songwriter Richard Marx. Released on April 26, 1989, it reached number one on the Billboard Pop Albums chart. The album was certified four times platinum in the United States due to five major singles on the Billboard charts, including two number-one hits: "Satisfied" and the platinum-certified "Right Here Waiting".

== History ==
Professional ratings
Review scores
Source	Rating
AllMusic	4/5 stars
Rolling Stone	2/5 stars

After touring for 14 months to promote his debut album, Marx returned to the studio with a number of songs that had been written while on the road. The album was recorded with well-known L.A.-area studio musicians and would go on to become even more successful than his debut record, pushing Prince's Batman out of the No. 1 spot on Billboard 200 album chart. Repeat Offender was the result of the energy generated from over a year and a half on the road and was written or co-written entirely by Marx. "Some people might think that it would be easier this time around, that I could just kick back." Marx said at the time, "but the truth is, it’s harder, I’ve got more to prove."

The first two singles, "Satisfied" and "Right Here Waiting," both reached number one, completing a string of three consecutive number-one singles. When the fourth single, "Angelia", reaching number four, Marx became the first solo artist to reach the top five with his first seven singles. Since then, "Right Here Waiting" has been covered numerous times, most notably by Monica and 112 in a 1998 duet.

"Children of the Night", was written in support of the (Van Nuys)-based organization for runaways. It became the sixth single from the album, and all royalties were donated to the charity.

Marx's second world tour began in the spring of 1989 and took him to Australia, Singapore, Malaysia, Japan, Europe, Canada, and the United States, lasting through August 1990. Highlights of that tour included a performance in the prestigious Royal Albert Hall in London and an invitation from Tina Turner to tour Germany.

Marx also had the once-in-a-lifetime opportunity to perform the Beatles' "Help!" at the Berlin Wall in late 1989. Marx received his second Grammy nomination in 1990 for "Best Pop Vocal Performance — Male" for "Right Here Waiting".

== Track listing ==
All tracks are written by Richard Marx, except where noted.

No.	Title	Lyrics	Music	Length
1.	"Nothin' You Can Do About It"			4:42
2.	"Satisfied"			4:12
3.	"Angelia"			5:16
4.	"Too Late to Say Goodbye"	Fee Waybill		4:57
5.	"Right Here Waiting"			4:23
6.	"Heart on the Line"	Marx; Bruce Gaitsch	Marx; Gaitsch	4:43
7.	"Real World"			4:13
8.	"If You Don't Want My Love"	Waybill		4:07
9.	"That Was Lulu (Note: Only on CD and Minidisc issues)"	Dean Pitchford		3:44
10.	"Wait for the Sunrise"			4:13
11.	"Children of the Night"			4:43
Total length:				49:24

Japanese release
No.	Title	Lyrics	Music	Length
10.	"Wild Life"	Marx; Rick Springfield	Marx; Springfield	4:08
11.	"Wait for the Sunrise"			4:13
12.	"Children of the Night"			4:43
Total length:				53:18

== Personnel ==
- Richard Marx – lead vocals, backing vocals (1–4, 6–12)
- Peter Doell - bass vocals (10)
- Michael Omartian – acoustic piano (1, 7, 12), keyboards (12)
- C. J. Vanston – keyboards (2–5, 8, 10, 11, 12)
- Bill Champlin – Hammond B3 organ and backing vocals (1, 7–9)
- Bill Payne – Hammond B3 organ (2)
- Bill Cuomo – keyboards (11)
- Steve Lukather – guitar and guitar solo (1)
- Bruce Gaitsch – guitar (2, 3, 5, 6, 8), guitar solo (6, 8), acoustic guitar (4)
- Michael Landau – guitar (2–4, 6, 7, 10, 11, 12), guitar solo (2–4, 11, 12)
- Jon Walmsley – guitar (7, 9), 1st guitar solo (7)
- Paul Warren – 2nd guitar solo (7), guitar (9, 11)
- John Pierce – bass guitar (1)
- Randy Jackson – bass guitar (2, 6, 8, 12)
- Jim Cliff – bass guitar (3, 4, 7, 9, 11)
- Nathan East - bass guitar (10)
- Mike Baird – drums (1, 2)
- Prairie Prince – drums (3, 4, 6, 10, 12)
- John Keane – drums (7, 11)
- John Robinson – drums (8)
- Michael DeRosier – drums (9)
- Paulinho da Costa – percussion (2, 8, 12)
- Lenny Castro - percussion (10)
- Marc Russo – saxophone (3, 12), sax solo (6)
- Dave Koz – saxophone (7, 9)
- Tom Scott – sax solo (12)
- Larry Williams – saxophones (12)
- Gary Grant – trumpet (12)
- Jerry Hey – trumpet (12)
- Dick Marx – horn arrangements (12)
- Bobby Kimball – backing vocals (1, 7–9)
- Cynthia Rhodes – backing vocals (2, 6, 12)
- Fee Waybill – backing vocals (4)
- David Cole – backing vocals (6)
- Bob Coy – backing vocals (6)
- Tommy Funderburk – backing vocals (6)
- Ruth Marx – backing vocals (6)
- John Moore – backing vocals (6)
- Shelley Cole – backing vocals (12)
- Kevin Cronin – backing vocals (12)
- Larry Gatlin – backing vocals (12)
- Rudy Gatlin – backing vocals (12)
- Steve Gatlin – backing vocals (12)
- Gene Miller – backing vocals (12)
- Don Shelton – backing vocals (12)
- Terry Williams – backing vocals (12)
- The Children of the Night – choir on "Children of the Night"

== Production ==
- All tracks arranged by Richard Marx, with assistance by Steve Lukather (track 1), Jeffrey Vanston (track 3) and Bruce Gaitsch (track 6).
- Produced by Richard Marx and David Cole
- Recorded by David Cole; assisted by Peter Doell.
- Mixed by David Cole
  - Assistant Engineers (recording and mix): Laura Livingston, Mark McKenna, Brian Scheuble, Bob Vogt, Charlie Paakkari, Leslie Ann Jones, Mike Bosley, Jay Lean, David Night, Tom Fouce.
- Mastered by Wally Traugott
- Production Coordination – Susanne Marie Edgren
- Art Direction – Henry Marquez
- Design – DZN – The Design Group
- Photography – E. J. Camp
- Management – Allen Kovac

== Charts ==
=== Weekly charts ===
Chart (1989–1990)	Peak position
Australian Albums (ARIA)	1
Austrian Albums (Ö3 Austria)	27
Canada Top Albums/CDs (RPM)	1
Dutch Albums (Album Top 100)	18
German Albums (Offizielle Top 100)	9
New Zealand Albums (RMNZ)	3
Norwegian Albums (VG-lista)	10
Swedish Albums (Sverigetopplistan)	7
Swiss Albums (Schweizer Hitparade)	7
UK Albums (Official Charts)	8
US Billboard 200	1

=== Year-end charts ===
Chart (1989)	Position
Australian Albums (ARIA)	13
Canada Top Albums/CDs (RPM)	9
European Albums (Music & Media)	95
German Albums (Offizielle Top 100)	71
New Zealand Albums (RMNZ)	30
US Billboard 200	26

Chart (1990)	Position
German Albums (Offizielle Top 100)	32
US Billboard 200	37

== Certifications ==
Region	Certification	Certified units/sales
Australia (ARIA)	2× Platinum	200,000
Canada (Music Canada)	6× Platinum	600,000^{^}
Germany (BVMI)	Gold	250,000^{^}
Hong Kong (IFPI Hong Kong)	Gold	10,000^{*}
New Zealand (RMNZ)	Gold	7,500^{^}
Sweden (GLF)	Gold	50,000^{^}
Switzerland (IFPI Switzerland)	Gold	25,000^{^}
United Kingdom (BPI)	Gold	100,000^{^}
United States (RIAA)	4× Platinum	4,000,000^{^}
^{*} Sales figures based on certification alone.^{^} Shipments figures based on certification alone.

== Miscellaneous ==
- The album was dedicated to Gabrielle de Martino.

== Repeat Offender Revisited ==
Repeat Offender Revisited

Studio album by Richard Marx
- Released: April 26, 2019
- Genres: Pop rock; adult contemporary
- Length: 55:01
- Label: BMG
- Producer: Richard Marx

Richard Marx chronology
The Ultimate Collection (2016)	Repeat Offender Revisited (2019)	Limitless (2020)

To celebrate the 30th anniversary of Repeat Offender, Marx released a collection of re-recorded studio and live versions of five of the album's singles as part of a catalog deal with BMG Rights Management.

=== Track listing ===
All tracks are written by Richard Marx, except where noted.

No.	Title	Lyrics	Length
1.	"Satisfied"		3:21
2.	"Angelia"		4:54
3.	"Too Late to Say Goodbye"	Fee Waybill	4:46
4.	"Right Here Waiting"		4:26
5.	"Angelia" (acoustic)		4:54
6.	"Too Late to Say Goodbye" (acoustic)	Waybill	4:01
7.	"Right Here Waiting" (acoustic)		4:49
8.	"Children of the Night" (acoustic)		4:13
9.	"Satisfied" (live)		6:03
10.	"Angelia" (live)		5:51
11.	"Right Here Waiting" (live)		8:03
Total length:			55:01
