= Richard Marx =

American singer-songwriter (born 1963)

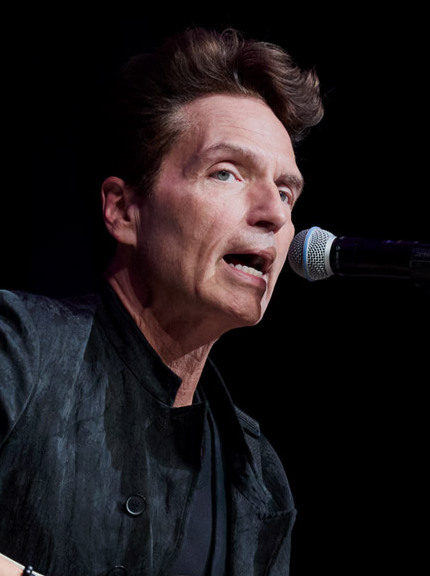
- Marx in 2025

Background information
- Born: Richard Noel Marx; September 16, 1963 (age 63); Chicago, Illinois, U.S.
- Origin: Highland Park, Illinois, U.S.
- Genres: Pop; soft rock; adult contemporary; pop rock
- Occupations: Singer; songwriter
- Instruments: Vocals; piano; guitar
- Years active: 1968–present
- Labels: Capitol; EMI; Manhattan; Signal 21; Zanzibar; Frontiers; Kobalt Label Services
- Spouse(s): Cynthia Rhodes (m. 1989; div. 2014) Daisy Fuentes (m. 2015)
- Website: richardmarx.com

Richard Noel Marx (born September 16, 1963) is an American singer-songwriter. He has sold over 30 million albums worldwide.

Marx's first number one success as a songwriter came in 1984 with "What About Me?", which was recorded by Kenny Rogers, Kim Carnes, and James Ingram, and topped the US and Canadian Adult Contemporary charts. His second chart-topper was 1985's "Crazy", a song he co-wrote with Rogers which reached number one in the Hot Country Songs chart. Marx's self-titled debut album went triple-platinum in 1987, and his first single, "Don't Mean Nothing", reached number three on the Billboard Hot 100 chart. Between 1987 and 1994, he had 14 top 20 hits, including three number one singles.

Marx is the only male artist in history to have his first seven singles reach the top 5 of the Billboard charts. He has scored a total of 14 number one singles, both as a performer and as a songwriter/producer. As a singer, his No. 1 hits include "Hazard", "Right Here Waiting", "Hold On to the Nights", "Endless Summer Nights", and "Satisfied". According to Billboard, Marx "holds the distinction of having written songs that have hit No. 1 on various Billboard charts in each of the last four decades."

Marx has written or collaborated on songs with other artists, including "This I Promise You" by NSYNC and "Dance with My Father" by Luther Vandross. Marx has been nominated for five Grammy Awards, winning Song of the Year for "Dance with My Father".

== Early life ==
Marx was born in Chicago, Illinois, the only child of former singer Ruth (née Guildoo) and Dick Marx, a jazz musician and founder of a jingle company in the early 1960s. His father was of German-Jewish descent. Marx attended North Shore Country Day School. He has three half-siblings from his father's previous marriage.

== Music career ==
Marx began his career in music at age five, singing commercial jingles written by his father's company; his list of advertising hits includes Arm & Hammer, Ken-L Ration and Nestlé Crunch. Marx was 17 and living in Highland Park, Illinois, when a tape of his songs ended up in the hands of Lionel Richie. Richie thought Marx had talent and told the teen, "I can't promise you anything, but you should come to L.A."

Marx said one of the first musicians he met in Los Angeles was Fee Waybill of the Tubes with whom he has collaborated at least 30 times. They met in a recording studio. In that same 2014 video segment for Ameoba Records, Marx called Waybill "my life-long best friend" and said Waybill is also godfather to his children. Waybill went into great detail about their working relationship in a 2020 interview with American Songwriter.

Marx and Vesta Williams provided harmony vocals for the Gordon Lightfoot and David Foster penned Anything for Love, for the former's 1986 album East of Midnight.

=== Debut album and stardom ===
Marx's self-titled debut album, released in June 1987, yielded four hit singles and went triple platinum. The debut single, "Don't Mean Nothing", is a song about the potential pitfalls of the music business. "Don't Mean Nothing" reached No. 3 on the U.S. Billboard Hot 100 and No. 1 on Billboard's Album Rock chart. Marx became the first new artist played on 117 radio stations nationwide during his initial week on the charts. The next two singles, "Should've Known Better" and "Endless Summer Nights", reached No. 3 and No. 2, respectively. The fourth single released from the album, "Hold On to the Nights", earned Marx his first No. 1 hit. The last three of the album's singles were also hits on Billboard's Adult Contemporary chart, beginning a long string of hits on that chart. Marx embarked on a 14 month world tour, initially opening for REO Speedwagon, but began headlining his own shows.

In 1988, Marx was nominated for a Grammy Award for Best Rock Vocal Performance – Solo for "Don't Mean Nothing". The same year, the song "Surrender to Me", which he co-wrote with Ross Vanelli, appeared in the film Tequila Sunrise.

Repeat Offender, Marx's second album, was released in May 1989. It rose to No. 1 on Billboard's album chart. It went triple platinum within a few months and eventually sold over 5 million copies in the United States alone. The first two singles, "Satisfied" and the platinum-selling "Right Here Waiting", both reached No. 1. "Right Here Waiting" was Marx's first No. 1 hit on the U.S. Adult Contemporary chart as well as his first big hit outside of North America, reaching No. 1 in several European countries and giving Marx his first top ten hit in the UK. It has been covered numerous times, most notably by Monica and 112 in a 1998 duet. Another single from the album, "Children of the Night", was written and composed in support of a Van Nuys-based organization for runaways. It became the sixth single from Repeat Offender.

Marx performed the Beatles' "Help" at the Berlin Wall in late 1989. Marx also received his second Grammy nomination in 1990 for Best Pop Vocal Performance – Male for "Right Here Waiting".

=== 1990s ===
In 1991, Marx released his third consecutive platinum album Rush Street. The album saw artists such as Luther Vandross and Billy Joel appear as backing vocalists and guest pianists. The disc's first single, "Keep Coming Back", went to No. 12 on the Hot 100 and its second single, "Hazard", made it to No. 9. Both songs hit No. 1 on Billboard's Adult Contemporary chart for four weeks and one week respectively. "Hazard" became Marx's second UK top ten, reaching No. 3.

In early 1994, as he and his family permanently left Los Angeles behind and returned to Chicago, Marx released Paid Vacation, and scored his fourth consecutive platinum album. The acoustic ballad "Now and Forever" peaked at No. 7 on the Hot 100, his final top ten hit on that chart.

The year 1997 saw the release of Flesh and Bone, Marx's final studio album on the Capitol imprint. The disc's first single, "Until I Find You Again", hit No. 3 on the U.S. Adult Contemporary chart and No. 42 on the Billboard Hot 100.

Marx's Greatest Hits compilation was released in November 1997. The 16-track album includes a variety of hit singles from his first five albums plus "Angel's Lullaby", a song written about his children originally appearing on For Our Children, Too, a compilation CD released in 1996 to benefit the Pediatric AIDS Foundation. Greatest Hits was released in Asia in November 1998 and included two new songs, "Slipping Away" and "Thanks to You", a tribute to his mother. The album was certified Gold in the U.S.

=== 2000s ===
In 2000, Marx debuted his sixth studio album, titled Days in Avalon. This disc was released on the Signal 21 Records label founded by Marx and former Blood, Sweat & Tears drummer and record producer Bobby Colomby. After signing a new deal with his former label, Manhattan Records, Marx released the 2004 album My Own Best Enemy.

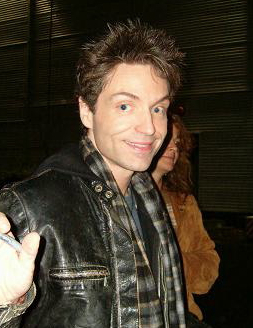
Marx in 2005

In 2008, Marx released Duo, on which he collaborated with Vertical Horizon's lead singer Matt Scannell.

On June 12, 2008, Marx was part of a PBS television series called Songwriters in the Round Presents: Legends & Lyrics. In Episode 102 of the first season, Marx appeared along with Kenny Loggins, Nathan Lee, and rock band Three Doors Down. This episode also features an interview with singer-songwriter Diane Warren.

On October 31, 2008, "Emotional Remains" and "Sundown" were released, as digital downloads, on Marx's official site.

On December 6, 2008, Marx headlined a fundraiser for cystic fibrosis research, "Newsapalooza", sponsored by WLS-AM's Roe Conn program, in which Marx both performed several of his hits with his band and accompanied Chicago broadcast news reporters and anchors covering rock hits.

In an interview published in Rolling Stone on June 26, 2009, Marx said he was "ashamed" of having been linked to a $1.92 million fine against single mother Jammie Thomas-Rasset by the Recording Industry Association of America (RIAA). Rasset had shared 24 songs on the file-sharing website Kazaa in 2005, and Marx's "Now and Forever" was one of them.

Marx played piano on the song "Here" and produced Matt Scannell's vocals on two tracks for Vertical Horizon's 2009 album, entitled Burning the Days.

=== 2010s ===
In March 2010, Marx released Stories to Tell, his first fully acoustic album.

On May 3, 2011, Marx was invited onto the stage at the Curran Theater in San Francisco by Hugh Jackman. It was opening night of Hugh Jackman in Performance. Jackman and Marx sang "Right Here Waiting" together, with Marx changing the lyrics of the last chorus to "right here waiting for Hugh".

Also on May 3, 2011, the reissue of Stories to Tell was released in the United States as a three-disc set exclusively through Walmart. The set included a "best of" disc, an acoustic disc of tracks, and a DVD of a live concert performance at the Shepherd's Bush venue in England. The album was also made available for purchase on iTunes and Amazon, but without the bonus DVD and album booklet. "Everybody" was released as a single in Europe and "When You Loved Me" was released in the U.S., peaking in the Top 20 on the Adult Contemporary chart.

In the summer 2011, Marx collaborated with the internet comedy duo Rhett and Link, producing a celebrity endorsement for a colon-cleansing spa in Sacramento, California. The ad spot and its "making of" was featured on an episode of Rhett and Link's Commercial Kings television series on IFC.

On November 1, 2011, Marx released The Christmas EP, a five-song collection of Christmas songs. In October 2012, Marx followed up The Christmas EP with a full album of holiday tracks that he called Christmas Spirit.

On July 8, 2014, Marx released his eleventh studio album, Beautiful Goodbye.

=== 2020s ===
Marx's next album, Limitless, was released on February 7, 2020. Its lead-off single, "Another One Down", hit No. 14 on Billboard's Adult Contemporary chart, giving Marx a span of 32 years at the format.

In 2021, he appeared in the Family Guy episode "Young Parent Trap".

His autobiography Stories to Tell, was released in July 2021.

Marx appeared as himself and performed "Right Here Waiting" in the 200th episode of The Goldbergs, "The Wedding" which aired in March 2022.

Marx's album Songwriter was released on September 30, 2022, with its lead single "Same Heartbreak, Different Day" released on July 15, 2022. A previous non-album single, "Just Go" that was subsequently released as a bonus track on the album Beautiful Goodbye is also on this album, along with the studio version of "Moscow Calling" that was also a bonus track on Beautiful Goodbye as a remix.

In 2025, Marx became a coach on The Voice Australia, alongside Melanie C, Ronan Keating, and Kate Miller-Heidke.

== Collaborations ==
- 1984 – Marx contributed backing vocals on Chicago (band)'s Chicago 17 album with the track "We Can Stop the Hurtin'".
- 1985 – Marx, along with Robert Lamm and David Foster, co-wrote the Chicago track "Good for Nothing" for the We Are the World album, and provided backing vocals. This was also the final recording with Peter Cetera with Chicago.
- 1986 – Marx contributed backing vocals on Madonna's True Blue album and can particularly be heard on the track "White Heat".
- 1988 – Marx co-wrote (with Fee Waybill) and played keyboards on "Edge of a Broken Heart", Vixen's first single from their debut album.
- 1991 – Marx contributed backing vocals on Cher's Love Hurts album and can particularly be heard on the track "A World Without Heroes".
- 1993 – Marx played piano on John Farnham's 1993 song "The Reason Why".
- 1997 – Marx recorded "At the Beginning" with Donna Lewis for the 1997 film Anastasia.
- 1997 – Marx recorded "Surrender to Me" with Lara Fabian for the 1997 album Flesh and Bones International Ed.
- 1999 – Marx built "Renegade Studios", a state of the art recording facility located in his hometown of Chicago, Illinois. Artists such as Philip Sayce, Keith Urban, and Emerson Drive have recorded material at this location.
- 2000 – Marx wrote and produced "This I Promise You", a single by NSYNC.
- 2002 – Marx collaborated with Mexican singer Paulina Rubio on her sixth studio album and first English debut album, writing the song titled "Border Girl" which led to the album's name titled Border Girl.
- 2004 – At the 46th Grammy Awards on February 8, 2004, Marx won a Grammy for Song of the Year for "Dance with My Father", which he wrote and composed in collaboration with Luther Vandross. On that same night, he played the piano accompanying Celine Dion in performing "Dance with My Father", since Vandross was not present at the ceremony for health reasons. (Vandross died the following year.)
- 2006 – During summer 2006, Marx toured with Ringo Starr & His All Starr Band. Other members of that year's All Starr Band included Edgar Winter, Sheila E, and Billy Squier.
- 2006 – Marx appeared on the Fox network's TV show Celebrity Duets in September 2006. Other singers to take part in the series included Smokey Robinson, Dionne Warwick, Cyndi Lauper, Kenny Loggins, Patti LaBelle, Randy Travis, Jesse McCartney, and Gladys Knight.
- 2007 – In 2007 Marx released a new ballad titled "Your Goodbye" and a new version of his classic love song "Hold On to the Nights" on a Phil Ramone compilation production called New Music from an Old Friend. This compilation was released on the Target label Spotlight.

== Personal life ==
On January 8, 1989, Marx married Cynthia Rhodes, a dancer who appeared in Staying Alive, Flashdance, and Dirty Dancing. Rhodes was also featured as the female lead in Marx's first video, "Don't Mean Nothing". They had three sons together. In April 2014, the couple announced they were divorcing.

On December 23, 2015, Marx married Cuban-American actress Daisy Fuentes in Aspen, Colorado.

On December 21, 2016, it was reported Marx helped Korean Air flight attendants restrain an unruly, possibly intoxicated passenger who was bothering staff and passengers while Marx and his wife were aboard a flight bound from Hanoi to Seoul. Marx provided photographic evidence of the incident via social media. He also criticized the airline's handling of the situation. In response, Korean Air stated did not respond to Marx's specific claims but did say they the airline would react more assertively to similar situations in the future.

He is a vegan.

== Discography ==
=== Studio albums ===
- Richard Marx (1987)
- Repeat Offender (1989)
- Rush Street (1991)
- Paid Vacation (1994)
- Flesh and Bone (1997)
- Days in Avalon (2000)
- My Own Best Enemy (2004)
- Emotional Remains (2008)
- Sundown (2008)
- Christmas Spirit (2012)
- Beautiful Goodbye (2014)
- Limitless (2020)
- Songwriter (2022)
- After Hours (2026)

== Filmography ==
Year	Film/Show	Role	Notes
1979	The Duke	Hermie	
1980	Coach of the Year	Himself	Credited as Richard Marks
2008	Ringo Starr & His All Starr Band Live 2006	Himself	
2008	Legends and Lyrics Vol 2	Himself	
2010	Tim and Eric Awesome Show, Great Job!	Himself	Episode: "Greene Machine"
2011	Stories to Tell	Himself	London, England
2012	A Night Out with Friends	Himself	Taped at Arcada Theatre in St. Charles, Illinois
2014	Back in the Day	Neighbor	
2017	Life in Pieces	Buddy Daquiri	Episode: "Poison Fire Teats Universe"
2017	Drop the Mic	Himself	Episode: "Wayne Brady vs. Jake Owen/Kenny G vs. Richard Marx"
2018	The Bachelorette	Himself	Episode: 3
2021	Family Guy	Himself	Episode: "Young Parent Trap"
2021	Full Frontal with Samantha Bee	Himself	Episode: "Full Frontal Wants to Take Your Guns"
2022	The Goldbergs	Himself	Episode: "The Wedding"
2025–	The Voice Australia	Himself/coach	Season 14

== Awards and nominations ==
ASCAP Pop Music Awards

Year	Nominee / work	Award	Result	Ref.
1986	"What About Me?"	Most Performed Songs	Won	
1986	"Crazy"	Most Performed Songs	Won	
1989	"Endless Summer Nights"	Most Performed Songs	Won	
1989	"Hold On to the Nights"	Most Performed Songs	Won	
1989	"Should've Known Better"	Most Performed Songs	Won	
1990	"Satisfied"	Most Performed Songs	Won	
1990	"Right Here Waiting"	Most Performed Songs	Won	
1991	"Right Here Waiting"	Most Performed Songs	Won	
1991	"Angelia"	Most Performed Songs	Won	
1994	"Take This Heart"	Most Performed Songs	Won	
1994	"Now and Forever"	Most Performed Songs	Won	
1996	"The Way She Loves Me"	Most Performed Songs	Won	
2002	"This I Promise You"	Most Performed Songs	Won	
2005	"Dance with My Father"	Most Performed Songs	Won	

Grammy Awards

Year	Nominee / work	Award	Result
1986	St. Elmo's Fire	Best Score Soundtrack for Visual Media	Nominated
1988	"Don't Mean Nothing"	Best Rock Vocal Performance, Male	Nominated
1990	"Right Here Waiting"	Best Pop Vocal Performance, Male	Nominated
2004	"Dance with My Father"	Song of the Year	Won
2004	"Dance with My Father"	Best R&B Song	Nominated

Billboard Music Awards

Year	Nominee / work	Award	Result
1987	Himself	Top New Artist	Nominated
1987	Himself	Top Billboard 200 Artist	Nominated
1987	Himself	Top Hot 100 Artist	Nominated
1987	Himself	Top Hot 100 Artist – Male	Nominated
1987	Richard Marx	Top Billboard 200 Album	Nominated
1987	"Don't Mean Nothing"	Top Hot 100 Song	Nominated
1988	Himself	Top Artist	Nominated
1988	Himself	Top Male Artist	Nominated
1988	Himself	Top Billboard 200 Artist	Nominated
1988	Himself	Top Billboard 200 Artist – Male	Nominated
1988	Himself	Top Hot 100 Artist	Nominated
1988	Himself	Top Hot 100 Artist – Male	Nominated
1988	Himself	Top Adult Contemporary Artist	Nominated
1988	Himself	Top Adult Contemporary Artist – Male	Nominated
1988	Richard Marx	Top Billboard 200 Album	Nominated
1994	Himself	Top Adult Contemporary Artist	Nominated
1994	"Now and Forever"	Top Adult Contemporary Track	Nominated

Other awards

Year	Awards	Work	Category	Result
1988	Pollstar Concert Industry Awards	Tour	Club Tour of the Year	Nominated
1990	Kids Choice Awards	Himself	Favorite Male Musician	Nominated
1990	American Music Awards	Himself	Favorite Pop/Rock Male Artist	Nominated
1990	ASCAP Film & TV Awards	"Surrender to Me"	Most Performed Song from Motion Picture	Won
2013	O Music Awards	Himself	Must Follow Artist on Twitter	Nominated
