= Should've Known Better (Richard Marx song) =

1987 single by Richard Marx

Single by Richard Marx

from the album Richard Marx
- B-side: "Rhythm of Life"
- Released: September 8, 1987
- Genre: Soft rock
- Length: 4:10 (album version); 3:38 (single mix)
- Label: Manhattan
- Songwriter: Richard Marx
- Producer: Richard Marx

Richard Marx singles chronology
"Don't Mean Nothing" (1987)	"Should've Known Better" (1987)	"Endless Summer Nights" (1988)

Music video
- "Should've Known Better" on YouTube

"Should've Known Better" is a song written, produced, and performed by American rock singer Richard Marx. It was released in September 1987 as the second single from his self-titled debut album. The song peaked at number three on the US Billboard Hot 100 chart as well as number seven on the Billboard Album Rock Tracks chart in 1987.

== Chart performance ==
"Should've Known Better" entered the US Billboard Hot 100 on September 26, 1987, at number 64, the highest debut of the week. It went on to peak at number three. The single also peaked at number 20 on the Billboard Adult Contemporary chart and number seven on the Album Rock Tracks chart, as well as number four on the Radio & Records CHR/Pop Airplay chart on November 20, 1987, for two weeks and remained on the chart for 13 weeks. Elsewhere, the single reached number 21 in Canada and number nine in Australia.

== Personnel ==
- Richard Marx – lead and backing vocals
- Tom Keane – keyboards
- Michael Landau – guitars
- John Pierce – bass
- Prairie Prince – drums
- Paulinho da Costa – percussion
- Fee Waybill – backing vocals

== Charts ==
=== Weekly charts ===
Chart (1987–1988)	Peak position
Australia (Australian Music Report)	9
Canada Top Singles (RPM)	21
UK Singles (Official Charts)	50
US Billboard Hot 100	3
US Adult Contemporary (Billboard)	20
US Mainstream Rock (Billboard)	7
US CHR/Pop Airplay (Radio & Records)	4

=== Year-end charts ===
Chart (1988)	Position
US Billboard Hot 100	47
