= Vertical Horizon discography =

Band discography

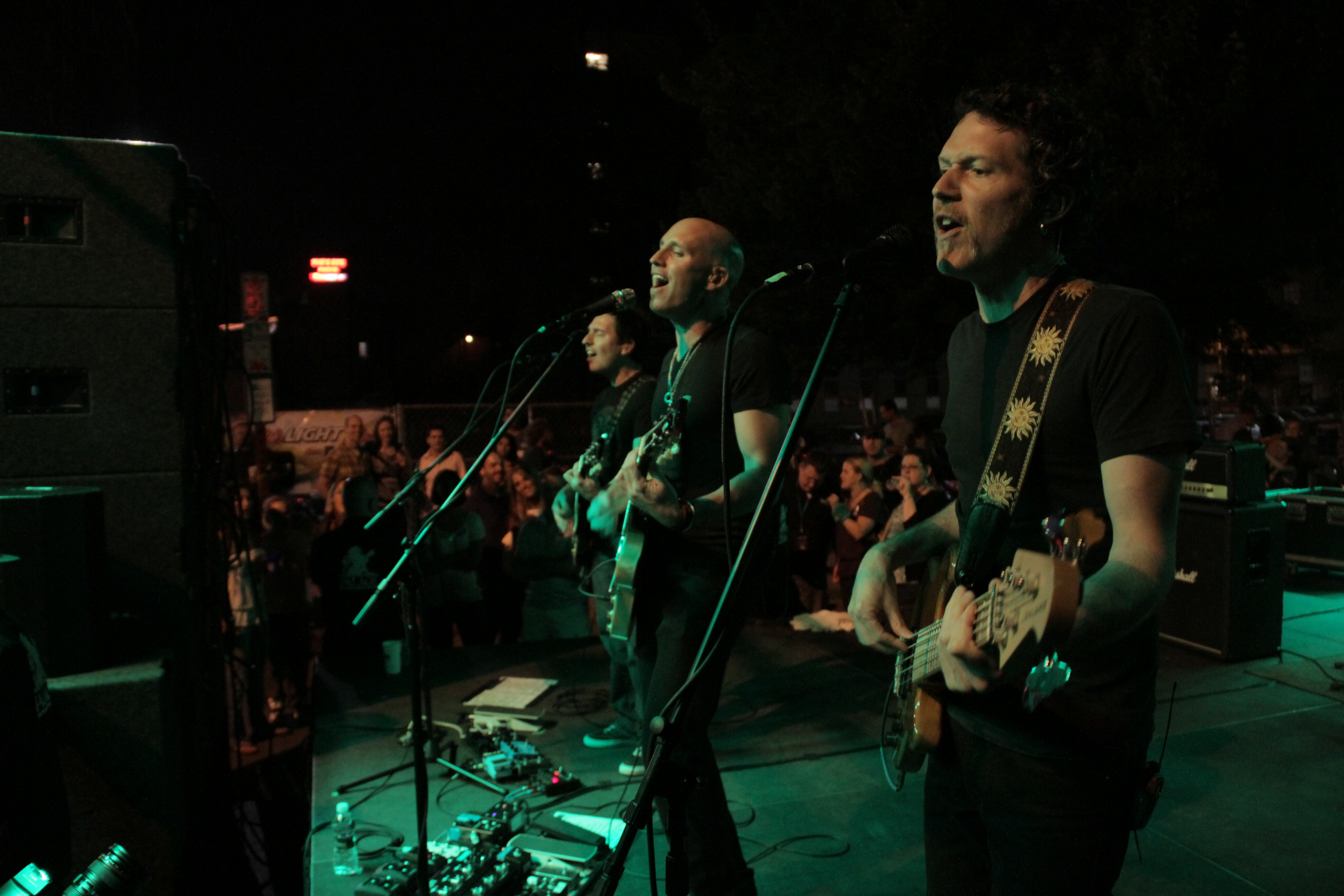
- Studio albums: 7
- Live albums: 1
- Singles: 13

This is a comprehensive discography of official recordings by Vertical Horizon, an American alternative band originally from Washington, D.C.

== Albums ==
=== Studio albums ===
List of studio albums, with selected details, chart positions and certifications
Title	Album details	Peak chart positions				Certifications (sales threshold)
Title	Album details	US	US Heat	AUS	UK	Certifications (sales threshold)
There and Back Again	Release date: 1992; Label: Rhythmic	—	—	—	—	
Running on Ice	Release date: 1995; Label: Rhythmic	—	—	—	—	
Everything You Want	Release date: June 15, 1999; Label: RCA	40	3	66	199	RIAA: 2× Platinum; MC: Gold
Go	Release date: September 23, 2003; Label: RCA/Hybrid	61	—	—	—	
Burning the Days	Release date: September 22, 2009; Label: Outfall Records	158	—	—	—	
Echoes from the Underground	Release date: October 8, 2013; Label: Outfall	164	—	—	—	
The Lost Mile	Release date: February 23, 2018; Label: Outfall	—	—	—	—	
"—" denotes releases that did not chart

=== Live albums ===
Live album, with selected details
Title	Album details
Live Stages	Release date: January 11, 1997; Label: Rhythmic

== Singles ==
List of singles, with selected chart positions and certifications
Title	Year	Peak chart positions								Album
Title	Year	US	US Pop	US Adult	US Alt	US AC	AUS	CAN	UK	Album
"We Are"	1999	—	—	—	21	—	—	—	—	Everything You Want
"Everything You Want"	1999	1	2	1	5	—	24	6	42	Everything You Want
"You're a God"	2000	23	10	4	15	—	59	19	—	Everything You Want
"Best I Ever Had (Grey Sky Morning)"	2001	58	25	7	—	—	—	—	—	Everything You Want
"I'm Still Here"	2003	—	—	17	—	—	—	—	—	Go
"Forever"	2005	—	—	18	—	17	—	—	—	Go
"When You Cry"	2006	—	—	35	—	—	—	—	—	Go
"Save Me from Myself"	2009	—	—	—	—	—	—	—	—	Burning the Days
"The Lucky One"	2010	—	—	—	—	—	—	—	—	Burning the Days
"Broken Over You"	2013	—	—	—	—	—	—	—	—	Echoes from the Underground
"I'm Gonna Save You"	2018	—	—	—	—	—	—	—	—	The Lost Mile
"More"	2018	—	—	—	—	—	—	—	—	The Lost Mile
"Written in the Stars"	2018	—	—	—	—	—	—	—	—	The Lost Mile
"Last Night of Our Lives"	2026	—	—	—	—	—	—	—	—	TBA
"—" denotes releases that did not chart
