= Sean Hurley =

American bass guitarist (born 1973)

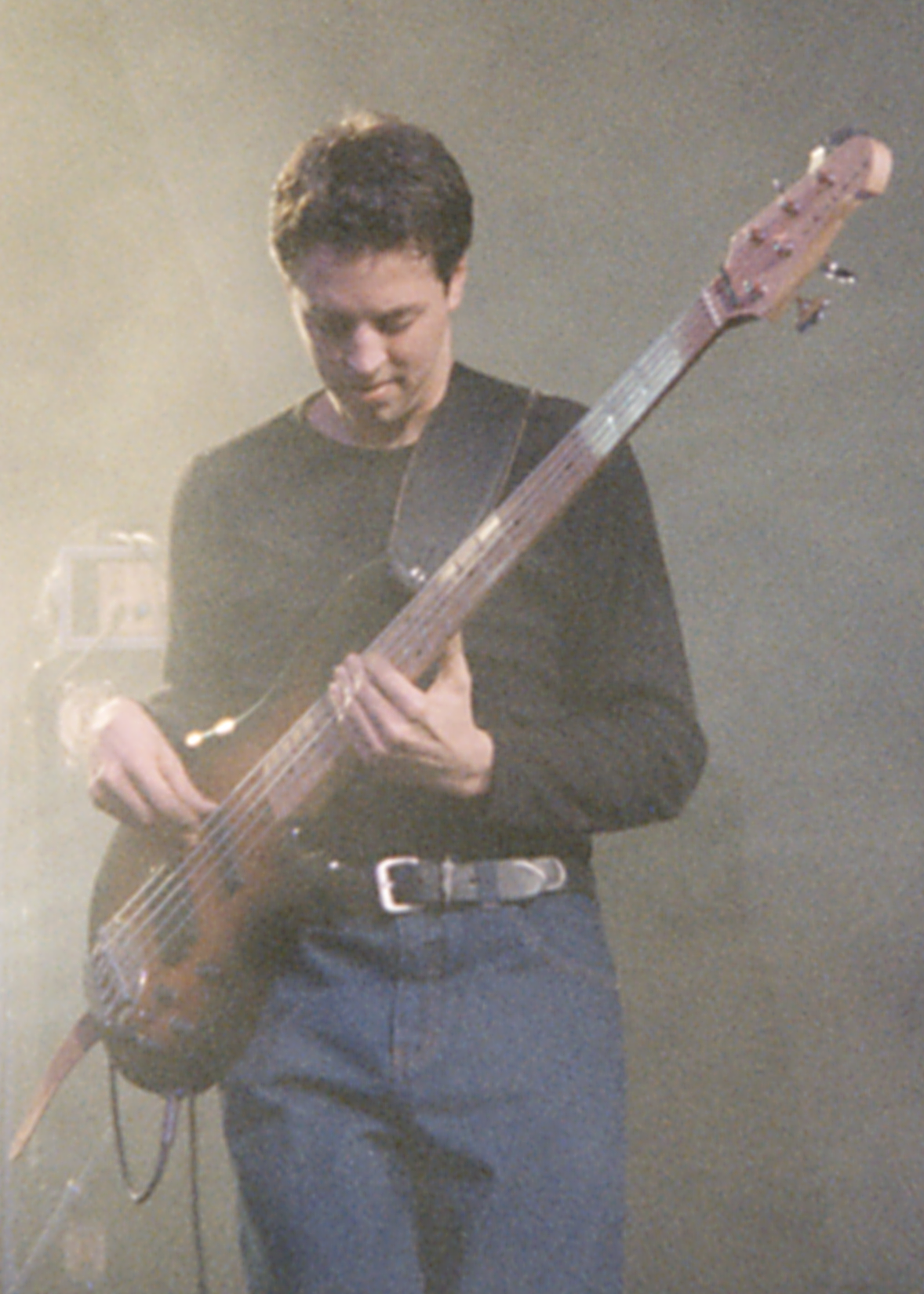
- Hurley with Vertical Horizon in 1998

Background information
- Born: September 21, 1973 (age 52); Pittsfield, Massachusetts, US
- Genres: Rock; pop; R&B
- Occupations: Musician; songwriter; record producer
- Instrument: Bass guitar
- Years active: 1990–present

Sean Hurley (born September 21, 1973) is an American bass guitarist, songwriter, and record producer. He is a successful touring and session musician based in Los Angeles.

Hurley began his career as Arlo Guthrie's bassist for two years. He then gained prominence as a member of the Washington DC-based rock band Vertical Horizon, playing on their number-one hit "Everything You Want" (1999). Hurley moved to Los Angeles in 2000 to work with Robin Thicke and began working as a general session bassist in the area in 2002. He received a co-songwriting credit on Thicke's 2006 hit "Lost Without U". That same year, he began working with John Mayer, playing on his tours and albums; as of 2024, their collaboration is still going. Other musicians Hurley has worked with include Miley Cyrus, Colbie Caillat, Michael Bublé, Gwen Stefani, Ringo Starr, Alanis Morissette, Lady A, Lana Del Rey, and Lizzy McAlpine.

Hurley has been recognized for his simple, yet versatile style of bass playing. He has been described as "a staple of the LA session scene" and a "session great". In 2013, the Fender Custom Shop introduced the Sean Hurley Signature Precision Bass.

== Biography ==
Sean Hurley was born in Pittsfield, Massachusetts. He first played the saxophone in fourth grade before taking up bass guitar at age 11. As a teenager, Hurley played in local bands as well as his school's jazz band and worked at a music store, giving bass lessons.

At age 16, Hurley was invited on tour with folk singer Arlo Guthrie, after meeting Guthrie's son while gigging around. Guthrie wanted Hurley to keep working for him after the summer tour ended, but Hurley decided to stay in high school. After graduating, Hurley spent one semester at Berklee College of Music in Boston, where he replaced Matt Garrison in a Yellowjackets cover ensemble, before returning to touring with Guthrie. Hurley explained how his work with Guthrie impacted his musicianship: "Arlo's body of work is big, and he'd start playing songs on stage that none of us had played before. I was serious about ear training, so I'd lay out for one chorus and listen, think I'm gonna get this, then dive in."

After two years with Guthrie, Hurley returned to Boston and spent a year playing blues, rock, and jazz club gigs. He eventually got the opportunity to audition for the rock band Vertical Horizon and was successful in joining. Shortly afterward, the band began work on their major-label debut album, Everything You Want. The double-platinum album included the number-one hit "Everything You Want" and other hits "You're a God" and "Best I Ever Had (Grey Sky Morning)". Lead singer Matt Scannell said of Hurley in 2014: "Sean is so stunningly talented ... His opportunities are better served for him to not be going out and playing tours with us. But we joke that his goal is to never have anyone else play bass on a Vertical Horizon record."

At the same time as his Vertical Horizon success, Hurley and colleague Bobby Keyes began traveling together to Los Angeles to work with Robin Thicke, then an up-and-coming R&B producer. He played on sessions for singer Mya that Thicke produced. As the sessions increased, Hurley moved there in 2000, and in 2002, as Vertical Horizon's success waned, he began working as a general session bassist in the city. He also continued working with Thicke and in 2006 received a co-songwriting credit for Thicke's hit "Lost Without U", on which he also played acoustic guitar.

Also in 2006, Hurley began his professional relationship with John Mayer. Hurley had met and been friendly with Mayer, as well as played with his guitarist David Ryan Harris, but they first worked together that December when Mayer, after learning Hurley played R&B, invited him to play on "Lesson Learned" by Alicia Keys, on which Mayer was a featured artist. Mayer then invited Hurley to play on his 2008 Summer Tour and, after "one or two tours", his album Born and Raised (2011). As of 2024, Hurley and Mayer's collaboration is still going and is "[o]ne of Hurley's most prominent gigs".

Since 2012, Hurley has been recognized as a "much-in demand L.A. session bassist", "a staple of the LA session scene", a "renowned session bassist", and a "session great". His other achievements include co-writing and co-producing the 2011 hit "International Love" by Pitbull, featuring Chris Brown, and, around 2012, opening his own studio in North Hollywood with session drummer Victor Indrizzo.

== Playing style and influences ==
Hurley's earliest musical influences were classic rock acts such as AC/DC and Rush. When he started playing bass, he studied the likes of Jaco Pastorius, Paul McCartney, James Jamerson, and Billy Sheehan. Stylistically, Hurley said in a 2010 interview that he most often plays on sessions for "rock, singer-songwriter, young artists pop," and occasionally film soundtracks, further saying, "I haven't worked much on the hip hop, modern R&B side, other than with Robin Thicke. The bass guitar hasn't really reemerged to supplant synth bass in those circles yet."

Writing for Bass Player magazine, Chris Jisi describes Hurley as "[a] focused, detailed, root-raving bassist"; Hurley himself has said, "I like playing the roots". Bassist and writer Ryan Madora says: "If three words could describe Hurley's playing, ... feel, intent, and class are what come to mind. As a session player, he has a deep understanding of groove and how to adapt to the feel of a song. ... There are never too many notes, never something out of place, and always respect for the direction and production of a song." Hurley has stressed in interviews the importance of close listening to and relationships with drummers.

Hurley has been noted for his ability to play simple, effective basslines as well as busier parts in the same song, adapting to the feel of different sections. Bassist and writer Ryan Madora says: "He can be reserved and supportive by playing simple parts that gracefully elevate a section of a song. He can just as easily play with a busier and more aggressive attitude to drive a verse or open up a chorus." She cites Hurley's work on "Wildfire" by John Mayer and "Smithereens" by Annie Lennox as examples of this. Another example is John Mayer's "A Face to Call Home", on which Hurley calls his work "almost like a through-composed bass line". In 2000, Alan Goldsher wrote in Bass Player on Hurley's playing with Vertical Horizon: "Hurley tends to shy away from look-at-me melodic runs, letting his on-point lines hover in the lowest range. That makes his periodic midrange flights—like his winsome countermelody on "Best I Ever Had (Grey Sky Morning)"—that much more effective."

Hurley's work on Born and Raised, his first album with John Mayer, has been the subject of attention. The album was largely inspired by 1970s singer-songwriter rock, namely "early Neil Young albums like After the Gold Rush and Harvest"; Hurley also referenced Bob Dylan records from the time. Writing for Bass Player, Chris Jisi describes Hurley's playing on the album as a "modern take on a classic, minimalist form"; similarly, John D'Auria writes that Hurley "step[s] out from the traditional roots role with some bass flair." According to Hurley, throughout the album's development Mayer "would occasionally encourage me to step out more and 'take a moment.'" As a result, many of Hurley's lines are busier, more melodic, or more riff-based than usual. This is perhaps most clear on the song "Queen of California", where he draws heavily from Paul McCartney. He explained: "I'm always looking for a McCartney-esque melodic line. Even though the song has a bit of an Allman Brothers vibe, I'm still channeling Paul. ... I just played my adapted version of [the Beatles'] "Tomorrow Never Knows". For his riff-based playing, Hurley has also cited as influences Marvin Gaye's "Inner City Blues (Make Me Wanna Holler)" and the Beatles' "Taxman" and "Come Together" ("Is there a way to play a root, a flat seven, a fifth, and kind of twist around those notes?"). "Shadow Days" and "If I Ever Get Around to Living" off the album also show Hurley's busier style of playing.

== Equipment and signature bass ==
Hurley's first bass was "an SG-shaped Hagstrom" before buying a Fender Precision Bass in his teens. He said he did not find his "true voice" on the bass until Vertical Horizon, when he had vintage gear. In 1998, he bought a Lakland 5-string active-pickup bass that sounded very bright; he used it on "Everything You Want" and Mya's Fear of Flying (2000) before returning to a rounder, deeper P-bass sound in light of hearing Pino Palladino on D'Angelo's Voodoo (2000), although he kept the Lakland and later used it on Miley Cyrus's "Fly on the Wall" (2008). Hurley said in 2010, "while I mostly played my [1969 Fender] Jazz Bass when I broke in, now it's predominately a P-Bass world." He used an Epiphone Jack Casady Signature Bass on the Robin Thicke song "Oh Shooter" (2002), which was an "attempt at a song that revolved around the bass". Hurley also owns an upright bass, an instrument he taught himself in high school. He plays both roundwound and flatwound strings and has expressed fondness for well-worn flats, even using Vaseline to deaden them more. Hurley often uses an Ampeg B-15 amplifier, including on Born and Raised and on tour with Mayer in 2014; in a 2010 interview he praised the amp and said he was using it "on almost every recording these days".

In 2012, while working on Born and Raised, Hurley found himself putting pieces of foam under the strings by the bridge of every bass he used on the record. This was to mute the strings and replicate the short decay of the basses he had heard on the reference records for the album. That December, Hurley was invited by Mike Eldred of the Fender Custom Shop to have his main 1961 Fender P-Bass recreated. Built by Paul Waller, the Sean Hurley Signature Precision Bass was unveiled to the public the following year. To address Hurley's muting technique, the bass includes a built-in muting device similar to that of a Fender Jaguar guitar; it is the first Fender bass with such a feature. Hurley presented his bass at La Bella String's "Lords of the Low End" event on September 28, before playing with Mayer at the Global Citizen Festival in Central Park.

== Selected discography ==
Alanis Morissette

- Havoc and Bright Lights (2012)

Annie Lennox

- Songs of Mass Destruction (2007)

Arlo Guthrie

- Alice's Restaurant: The Massacree Revisited (1996)

Colbie Caillat

- Breakthrough (2009)
- All of You (2011)
- Christmas in the Sand (2012)

Gwen Stefani

- You Make It Feel Like Christmas (2017)

Jason Mraz

- "More than Friends" (featuring Meghan Trainor)

John Mayer

- Born and Raised (2012)
- Paradise Valley (2013)
- Sob Rock (2021)

Lady A

- Heart Break (2017)

Lana Del Rey

- "Beautiful People Beautiful Problems" (featuring Stevie Nicks)

Leonard Cohen

- "Treaty" (2016)

Lizzy McAlpine

- "All Falls Down" (2024)

Lukas Graham

- "Share That Love" (featuring G-Eazy)

Melissa Etheridge

- Fearless Love (2010)

Michael Bublé

- Nobody but Me (2016)
- Higher (2022)

Miley Cyrus

- Hannah Montana 2: Meet Miley Cyrus (2007)
- Breakout (2008)
- Can't Be Tamed (2010)

Mya

- Fear of Flying (2000)

Ringo Starr

- Liverpool 8 (2008)

Rob Thomas

- Cradlesong (2009)

Robin Thicke

- A Beautiful World (2002)
- The Evolution of Robin Thicke (2006)
- Something Else (2008)

Vertical Horizon

- Everything You Want (1999)
