= Duo Live =

2010 live album by Richard Marx and Matt Scannell

Compilation album by Richard Marx and Matt Scannell
- Released: October 2010
- Recorded: October 16, 2009
- Venues: Arcada Theatre, St. Charles
- Genres: Rock; adult contemporary
- Length: 66:39
- Label: Zanzibar Records
- Producers: Richard Marx; Matt Scannell

Richard Marx and Matt Scannell chronology
| Duo (2008) | Duo Live (2010) |

Richard Marx chronology
| Hits & Ballads (2010) | Duo Live (2010) | The Christmas EP (2011) |

Matt Scannell with Vertical Horizon chronology
| Burning the Days (2009) | Duo Live (2010) | Echoes from the Underground (2013) |

Duo Live is a live album by singer-songwriter Richard Marx and Vertical Horizon frontman Matt Scannell. Recorded live at the Arcada Theatre in St. Charles, Illinois on October 16, 2009, the album was released by Marx's label Zanzibar Records in October 2010.

== Track listing ==
| No. | Title | Writer(s) | Length |
|---|---|---|---|
| 1. | "Endless Summer Nights" | Richard Marx | 5:10 |
| 2. | "Good Evening" (dialogue) | | 0:16 |
| 3. | "You're a God" | Matt Scannell | 4:16 |
| 4. | "We're Recording..." (dialogue) | | 3:11 |
| 5. | "Now and Forever" | Marx | 4:24 |
| 6. | "Freebird Intervention" (dialogue) | | 2:18 |
| 7. | "Give You Back" | Scannell | 4:52 |
| 8. | "Hazard" | Marx | 4:26 |
| 9. | "I'm Still Here" | Scannell | 4:00 |
| 10. | "Don't Mean Nothing" | Marx; Bruce Gaitsch | 4:52 |
| 11. | "We'll Talk About It Later" (dialogue) | | 2:19 |
| 12. | "We Are" | Scannell | 4:16 |
| 13. | "Should've Known Better" | Marx | 4:26 |
| 14. | "Everything You Want" | Scannell | 4:48 |
| 15. | "I'm Not Running" | Marx; Scannell | 4:37 |
| 16. | "Best I Ever Had" | Scannell | 4:50 |
| 17. | "Right Here Waiting" | Marx | 5:40 |
| Total length: | | | 66:39 |

== Album credits ==
=== Personnel ===
- Richard Marx – lead and backing vocals, acoustic guitar, piano, arrangements
- Matt Scannell – lead and backing vocals, acoustic guitar, arrangements

=== Production ===
- Richard Marx – producer
- Matt Scannell – producer
- Matt Prock – recording, engineer, mixing
- Steve Hardy – mastering
