= Duo (Richard Marx and Matt Scannell album) =

Studio album by Richard Marx and Matt Scannell
- Released: May 12, 2008
- Studios: Renegade Studio; Two Tone Studio
- Genre: Adult contemporary
- Length: 43:19
- Label: Zanzibar Records
- Producers: Richard Marx; Matt Scannell

Richard Marx and Matt Scannell chronology
Duo (2008)	Duo Live (2010)

Richard Marx chronology
My Own Best Enemy (2004)	Duo (2008)	Emotional Remains (2008)

Matt Scannell with Vertical Horizon chronology
Go (2003)	Duo (2008)	Burning the Days (2009)

Duo is an acoustic album by singer-songwriter Richard Marx and Vertical Horizon vocalist Matt Scannell, released by Zanzibar Records on May 12, 2008. The album was initially sold exclusively through Marx's website, but was later made available for sale at their concerts together as well. Marx re-recorded "Always on Your Mind," for his 2008 album Sundown.

== Track listing ==
No.	Title	Writer(s)	Original release	Length
1.	"Always on Your Mind"	Richard Marx; Matt Scannell	New recording	3:57
2.	"Sunshine"	Scannell	Go, 2003	3:40
3.	"Endless Summer Nights"	Marx	Richard Marx, 1987	4:29
4.	"We Are"	Scannell	Everything You Want, 1999	4:25
5.	"Hazard"	Marx	Rush Street, 1991	4:35
6.	"Give You Back"	Scannell	Everything You Want	4:25
7.	"Love Goes On"	Marx	My Own Best Enemy, 2004	3:46
8.	"Echo"	Scannell	Go	4:26
9.	"Your World"	Marx	Rush Street	5:07
10.	"Everything You Want"	Scannell	Everything You Want	4:31
Total length:				43:19

== Personnel ==
- Richard Marx – lead and background vocals, acoustic guitar, piano, producer, arranger
- Matt Scannell – lead and background vocals, acoustic guitar, producer, arranger
- Joel Numa – engineer
- Mat Prock – engineer
