= Richard Marx session discography =

This is a list of Richard Marx's session work playing various instruments and singing backing vocals for various artists.

== 1980s ==
=== 1982 ===
Lionel Richie - Lionel Richie

- "You Are" (backing vocals)

=== 1983 ===
Lionel Richie - Can't Slow Down

- "All Night Long" (backing vocals)
- "Running with the Night" (backing vocals)

=== 1984 ===
George Benson - 20/20

- "Nothing's Gonna Change My Love for You" (backing vocals)

Chicago - Chicago 17

- "We Can Stop the Hurting" (backing vocals)

Julio Iglesias - 1100 Bel Air Place

- "Moonlight Lady" (backing vocals)

Fee Waybill - Read My Lips

- "Who Loves You Baby" (backing vocals)

Peabo Bryson - Straight from the Heart

- If Ever You're in My Arms Again (backing vocals)
- Learning the Ways of Love (backing vocals)

=== 1985 ===
Whitney Houston - Whitney Houston

- "Saving All My Love for You" (backing vocals, guitars)
- "All at Once" (backing vocals, guitars)
- "The Greatest Love of All" (backing vocals, guitars)
- "Hold Me" (backing vocals, guitars)

=== 1986 ===
Madonna - True Blue

- "White Heat" (backing vocals)

=== 1987 ===
Barbra Streisand - One Voice

- "Somewhere" (backing vocals)
- "Evergreen" (backing vocals)
- "Something's Coming" (backing vocals)
- "People" (backing vocals)
- "Send In the Clowns" (backing vocals)
- "Over the Rainbow" (backing vocals)
- "Guilty" (backing vocals)
- "What Kind of Fool" (backing vocals)
- "Papa, Can You Hear Me?" (backing vocals)
- "The Way We Were" (backing vocals)
- "It's a New World" (backing vocals)
- "Happy Days Are Here Again" (backing vocals)
- "America the Beautiful" (backing vocals)

=== 1988 ===
Vixen - Vixen

- "Edge of a Broken Heart" (keyboards)

=== 1989 ===
Michael Bolton - Soul Provider

- "Soul Provider" (backing vocals)

Billy Joel - Storm Front

- "That's Not Her Style" (backing vocals)
- "Storm Front" (backing vocals)

== 1990s ==
=== 1990 ===
Tim Feehan - Full Contact

- "Heart in Pieces" (backing vocals)

=== 1993 ===
John Farnham - Then Again

- "The Reason Why" (piano)

=== 1995 ===
Michael Bolton - Greatest Hits (1985–1995)

- "Soul Provider" (backing vocals)

Amy Sky - Cool Rain

- "Til Tomorrow" (backing vocals)

=== 1997 ===
Fee Waybill - Don't Be Scared By These Hands

- "I Know You" (backing vocals)
- "Tall Dark and Harmless" (backing vocals)
- "Shut Up and Love Me" (backing vocals)
- "The Swing of Things" (backing vocals)
- "Fools Cry" (backing vocals)
- "Surprise Yourself" (backing vocals)
- "I've Seen This Movie Before" (backing vocals)
- "What's Wrong with That" (backing vocals)
- "Somewhere Deep Inside" (keyboards)

=== 1998 ===
Sarah Brightman - Eden

- The Last Words You Said (backing vocals)

=== 1999 ===
Barbra Streisand - A Love Like Ours

- "If You Ever Leave Me" (Duet with Vince Gill) (keyboards)

== 2000s ==
=== 2000 ===
Natalie Cole - Greatest Hits-Volume 1

- "Angel on My Shoulder" (backing vocals)

Barry Mann - Soul and Inspiration

- "Rock and Roll Lullaby" (backing vocals)

Kenny Rogers - There You Go Again

- "Crazy Me" (backing vocals)
- "I Do It for Your Love" (backing vocals, keyboards)

=== 2001 ===
Natalie Cole - Love Songs

- "Angel on My Shoulder" (backing vocals)

Josh Groban - Josh Groban

- "To Where You Are" (keyboards, piano)

=== 2002 ===
Michael Bolton - Only a Woman Like You

- "Slowly" (backing vocals)
- "I Surrender" (backing vocals, keyboards)
- "Eternally" (backing vocals, keyboards)

Chris Botti - December

- "Have Yourself a Merry Little Christmas" (backing vocals)

Marie Sisters - Marie Sisters

- "I Will Hold On" (strings)
- "If I Fall in Love Tonight" (backing vocals)

Olivia Newton-John - 2

- "Never Far Away" (Duet with Richard Marx) (keyboards)

Barbra Streisand - Duets

- "If You Ever Leave Me" (Duet with Vince Gill) (keyboards)

=== 2003 ===
Chicago - The Box

- "We Can Stop the Hurting" (backing vocals)

Billy Ray Cyrus - The Other Side

- "Tip of My Heart" (backing vocals)

Kenny Loggins - It's About Time

- "With This Ring" (backing vocals, keyboards)
- "I Miss Us" (backing vocals, keyboards)
- "The One That Got Away" (acoustic piano)

Kristy Starling - Kristy Starling

- To Where You Are (keyboards)

Luther Vandross - Dance with My Father

- "Dance with My Father" (keyboard and drum programming)

=== 2004 ===
Sissel - My Heart

- Someone Like You (all instruments)
- Beyond Imagination (backing vocals, keyboards, drum programming)

=== 2005 ===
Disney's Happiest Celebration on Earth: 50 Years

- LeAnn Rimes - "Remember When" (piano, keyboards, backing vocals)

=== 2006 ===
Sister Hazel - Absolutely

- "Meet Me in the Memory" (keyboards))

Luther Vandross - The Ultimate Luther Vandross

- "Dance with My Father" (keyboards and drum programming)

=== 2007 ===
Kenny Loggins - How About Now

- "I'll Remember Your Name" (backing vocals, acoustic guitar)

New Music from an Old Friend

- Kenny Loggins - "I'll Remember Your Name" (backing vocals, acoustic guitar)

=== 2008 ===
George Canyon - What I Do

- "Just Like You" (backing vocals)
- "Pretty Drunk Out Tonight" (backing vocals)
- "All or Nothing" (backing vocals)
- "Let It Out" (backing vocals)
- "In Your Arms Again" (arranger, piano, strings)
- "Back to Life" (backing vocals)
- "Betty's Buns" (backing vocals)
- "If I Was Jesus" (backing vocals)
- "What I Do" (arranger, strings)
- "Last Man" (backing vocals)
- "I Believe in Angels" (backing vocals)

=== 2009 ===
Katherine Jenkins - Believe

- "Fear of Falling" (backing vocals)

Red - Innocence & Instinct

- "Out from Under" (backing vocals)

Vertical Horizon - Burning the Days

- "Here" (piano)

== 2010s ==
=== 2010 ===
Ringo Starr - Y Not

- "Mystery of the Night" (backing vocals)

Rhonda Vincent - Taken

- "Taken" (backing vocals)

=== 2013 ===
Heart

- All Through the Night (backing vocals)

Vertical Horizon - Echoes from the Underground

- "You Never Let Me Down" (piano, backing vocals)
- "Evermore" (backing vocals)
- "Song for Someone" (backing vocals)
- "Consolation" (backing vocals)

=== 2014 ===
Heart - Home for the Holidays

- All Through the Night - (vocals)

=== 2015 ===
Ringo Starr - Postcards from Paradise

- "Right Side of the Road" (backing vocals)
- "Not Looking Back" (guitars, backing vocals)

=== 2018 ===
Vertical Horizon - The Lost Mile

- "I'm Not Running" (backing vocals)

=== 2019 ===
Matt Nathanson - Postcards (from Chicago)

- "Surrender" (Duet with Richard Marx)

== 2020s ==
=== 2020 ===
Fee Waybill - Rides Again

- "Faker" (background vocals)
- "How Dare You" (guitar, bass, keyboards, background vocals)
- "Don't Want to Pull the Trigger" (background vocals)
- "Say Goodbye" (acoustic guitar, keyboards, background vocals)
- "Promise Land" (guitar, bass, keyboards, background vocals)
- "Man Of the World" (guitar, keyboards, background vocals)
- "Still You on the Inside" (guitar, keyboards, background vocals)
- "Woulda Coulda Shoulda" (bass, keyboards, background vocals)
- "Meant To Be Alone" (background vocals)
