= Seth Horan =

- Born: Seth Alexander Horan
- Origin: Buffalo, New York, U.S.
- Genres: Funk, rock, pop
- Occupation: Musician
- Instruments: Vocals, bass
- Years active: 1994–present
- Labels: Independent
- Website: sethhoran.bandcamp.com

Seth Horan is an American bassist/singer-songwriter from Buffalo, New York who started a successful solo career after stints with Darwin's Waiting Room and Vertical Horizon. His songwriting showcases both his voice and his unique playing style, which combines fingerpicking, slapping, tapping, strumming, and use of harmonics as solo accompaniment for his singing. He currently resides in Syracuse, New York.

== Music career ==
=== 1994–1998 ===
Horan began his professional career in 1994, providing bass and vocals for the Miami rock band Jennifer Culture, with whom he played until 1995.

Later in 1995, he joined the rap/rock band Darwin's Waiting Room, in which he performed as bassist and vocalist during 1995-96. Darwin's Waiting Room is currently signed to MCA Records.

In 1997, Horan joined Vertical Horizon as bassist and backing vocalist. The band was signed by RCA, and Horan played on the demos that led to Vertical Horizon's hit single, "Everything You Want" (the #1 Billboard song of July, 2000), but left the band before the song's final recording and release. Billboard Hot 100

=== 1998–2001 ===
Horan realized that in order to present his own music to the world, and do so in the most meaningful way, he was going to have to do it alone, at least for a while. So in 1999 he began performing live shows as a solo singer/songwriter, accompanying his voice only with his bass. Key to this goal was building a following on the college circuit, and he made the rounds at numerous New York and Massachusetts, such as the University at Buffalo, Medaille College, Rochester Institute of Technology, Keuka College, and Tufts University. He released his first solo album, ...this is the session., in 2000.

After releasing ...this is the session., Horan relocated to Los Angeles, California in 2001. He was active on the open-mic circuit and continued his practice of playing at local colleges and universities, adding Chapman University, Scripps College, the University of Southern California, and California Polytechnic University to his roster. He picked up session work as a bassist in between playing shows and self-producing a five-song EP, ;torn up;. Subtitled "Sketches in progress", the EP featured Horan doing triple duty on vocals, bass and drums, and served as a prelude to his next full-length album.

He also became an active member in the Los Angeles chapter of the Just Plain Folks Music Organization in 2001, and in 2003, he received their 2002 Founders Award for Male Artist of the Year.

=== 2001–2003 ===
Recording for the new album, to be called Notwithstanding, began in late 2001 at the Malgamar Studio House, owned and operated by fellow East-Coast transplant David Peters. Horan and Peters produced the album along with Vertical Horizon drummer Ed Toth, with whom Horan had originally played in Jennifer Culture. Notwithstanding was released in 2002.

2002 brought a huge change to Horan's life: he decided to go on tour literally full-time. He ended up without a permanent address, living mainly in motels, his own van, and the vehicles of other touring musicians, from March 2002 until May 2005. During this period, Horan played approximately 420 shows and crisscrossed the country from coast to coast at least 29 times, finally settling in Reno, Nevada. During this period, he widened the scope of his college circuit endeavors still further, including performances at the University of New Mexico in Albuquerque, Lewis & Clark College, Wayne State University, the University of Dallas, and Antioch College.

Lack of a permanent address did not, however, mean the end of Horan's musical creativity. In 2003, he began to experiment with the musical and technical possibilities of effects pedals, integrating a digital delay/loop pedal into both his songwriting and live performances. He continues to use a BOSS Corporation loop station for recording and live shows, to impressive effect.

=== 2003–2006 ===
Slightly more than a year into his three-year tour, Horan was signed by Benchmark Records, an independent label based in Indianapolis, Indiana. Through Benchmark, Horan was able to remix and remaster Notwithstanding for reissue in late 2003, and in July 2003, he recorded the tracks for his third full-length album, Conduit. Through the end of 2003, several live performances across the country were also recorded, for inclusion in a compilation download available with preorders of the album.

Conduit was released in 2004, and the pace of Horan's touring increased to support and promote the new album. Along with a full slate of performances on the cross-country college circuit, he played a number of shows at Borders Books and Music locations in New York, Kansas and California.

Unfortunately, Benchmark closed its doors in December 2004, leaving Horan without a label throughout 2005 and going into the Winter NAMM Show in January 2006. For several years, however, numerous musicians played shows in the lobby of the Anaheim Marriott Hotel after the trade show ended each day, and that year, Horan's set was seen by Hans-Peter Wilfer, head of Warwick bass guitars. In a conversation following the show, Wilfer invited Horan (already a Warwick endorsee to the extent of receiving discounts on gear and special assistance on repairs) to play at the Warwick booth during the Musikmesse trade show in Frankfurt am Main, Germany in March 2006...and offered to build him a custom bass.

On the strength of his performances at the Musikmesse, Horan was contracted to be Warwick's first-ever bass clinician and product demonstrator. After two weeks of intensive training in June 2006 at the Warwick factory in Markneukirchen, Germany learning the details of what makes Warwick's instruments special, he began performing and leading bass clinics an average of once a month, both within the US and internationally. Traveling from his base in Reno, Horan has represented Warwick in Canada, the United Kingdom, Germany, Spain, Portugal, Italy, Hungary, Denmark, Sweden, Norway, Brazil, mainland China, and Australia. Most recently, Horan represented Warwick at the January 2008 NAMM show and March 2008 Musikmesse - all this while maintaining a significant tour schedule in the US.

=== 2006–2009 ===
Also in 2006, Horan was awarded a 2006-2007 Fellowship by the Nevada Arts Council. This grant helped him record and release his fifth album, the Happenstance EP, in early 2007.

Horan released his first DVD, Between Two Oceans, in 2008. The DVD, a collaboration with Los Angeles film editor and independent filmmaker Keith A. Cox, features interviews, conversations, and live performance footage recorded between 2001–2007, and explores the progression of his music through the stages of his life and career. In fact, Cox spent significant time in 2001 and 2002 recording Horan at shows in Los Angeles and on tour, and later provided him a camera to continue the recording process.

A project close to Horan's heart is the Three Men on Bass series. Begun in September 2002, the nearly annual series includes performances by Horan and fellow solo singer/songwriter/bassists Gonzalo Silva and Tom Bianchi. The trio is currently scheduled to play four shows in June and July 2008.

Early 2009, Seth started playing a custom built fanned fret 5 string bass by luthier Jared Carpenter (http://www.jcbasses.com) of Auburn, CA. The bass was used in the recording of his latest album "Clang & Chime" due out in October 2009.

=== 2010–2014 ===
Horan spent much of this period stepping back from performance and recording to focus on educational music workshops and private music instruction, though he did begin work on eight songs that would eventually be released through his Patreon page and later releases.

=== 2015–present ===
In 2015, Horan began releasing songs to fans who subscribe to his page on Patreon.com — He released 9 songs that year, followed by 7 songs in 2016 and 10 songs in 2017. Some of the songs also appeared on a limited edition CD release titled “The Mean”, which came out in December 2016.

Horan performs periodic web concerts which are broadcast to patrons and fans, and in May 2017, he began releasing a monthly podcast, which features his own music, as well as interviews with and music from other independent musicians.

== Discography ==
...this is the session. - 2000

Torn Up; EP - 2001

Notwithstanding - 2002

Conduit - 2004

Happenstance EP - 2007

Clang & Chime - 2009

Animal Mouth - 2013

The Mean - 2016

== DVDs ==
Between Two Oceans - 2008
