= We Are =

We Are may refer to:

== Music ==
=== Albums ===
- We Are (Jon Batiste album), 2021
- We Are (The City Harmonic album), 2015
- We Are (Lucy Spraggan album), 2015
- We Are (EP), by I-dle, 2025

=== Songs ===
- "We Are" (Ana Johnsson song), 2004
- "We Are." (Do As Infinity song), 2000
- "We Are" (Hollywood Undead song)
- We Are (Vertical Horizon song), 1999
- "We Are (Family)", a song from the 2012 film Ice Age: Continental Drift
- We Are, a 2008 EP by Cassette Kids
- We Are, a 2020 EP by Weeekly
- We Are, a 2011 album by Elan Atias
- "We Are", a 2013 song by Big Time Rush from 24/Seven
- "We Are", a 2015 song by Justin Bieber featuring Nas from Purpose
- "We Are", a 2022 song by Mirror
- "We Are", a 2017 song by One Ok Rock
- "We Are", a 2007 song by Ty Herndon from Right About Now
- "We Are!", a song performed by Hiroshi Kitadani and used for the first opening of One Piece
- "0.00 (We Are)", a song from Childish Gambino's 2020 album 3.15.20

== Other uses ==
- We Are (TV series), a 2024 Thai television series
- We Are (Argentina), democratic socialist and feminist party
- We Are (Mexico), centre-left political party
