= David A. Smith (designer) =

British designer (born 1968)

David Smith MBE
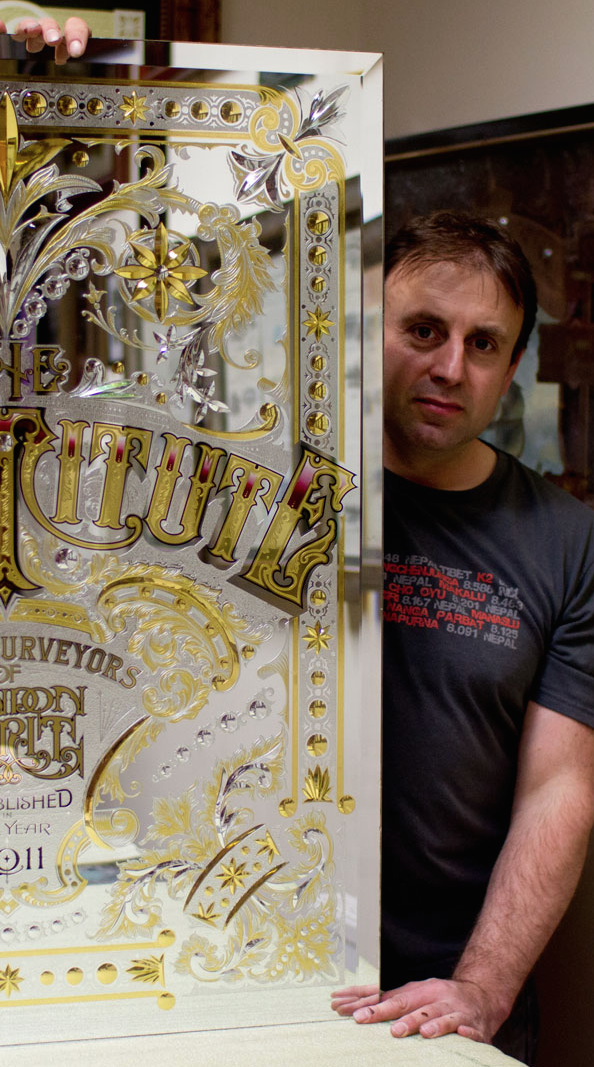
- Born: David Adrian Smith; 1968 (age 57–58); Stroud, Gloucestershire
- Occupations: Designer, glass embosser, gilder and signwriter
- Spouse: Melissa Smith
- Children: Hannah Smith; Lauren Smith; Amelia Smith
- Website: davidadriansmith.com

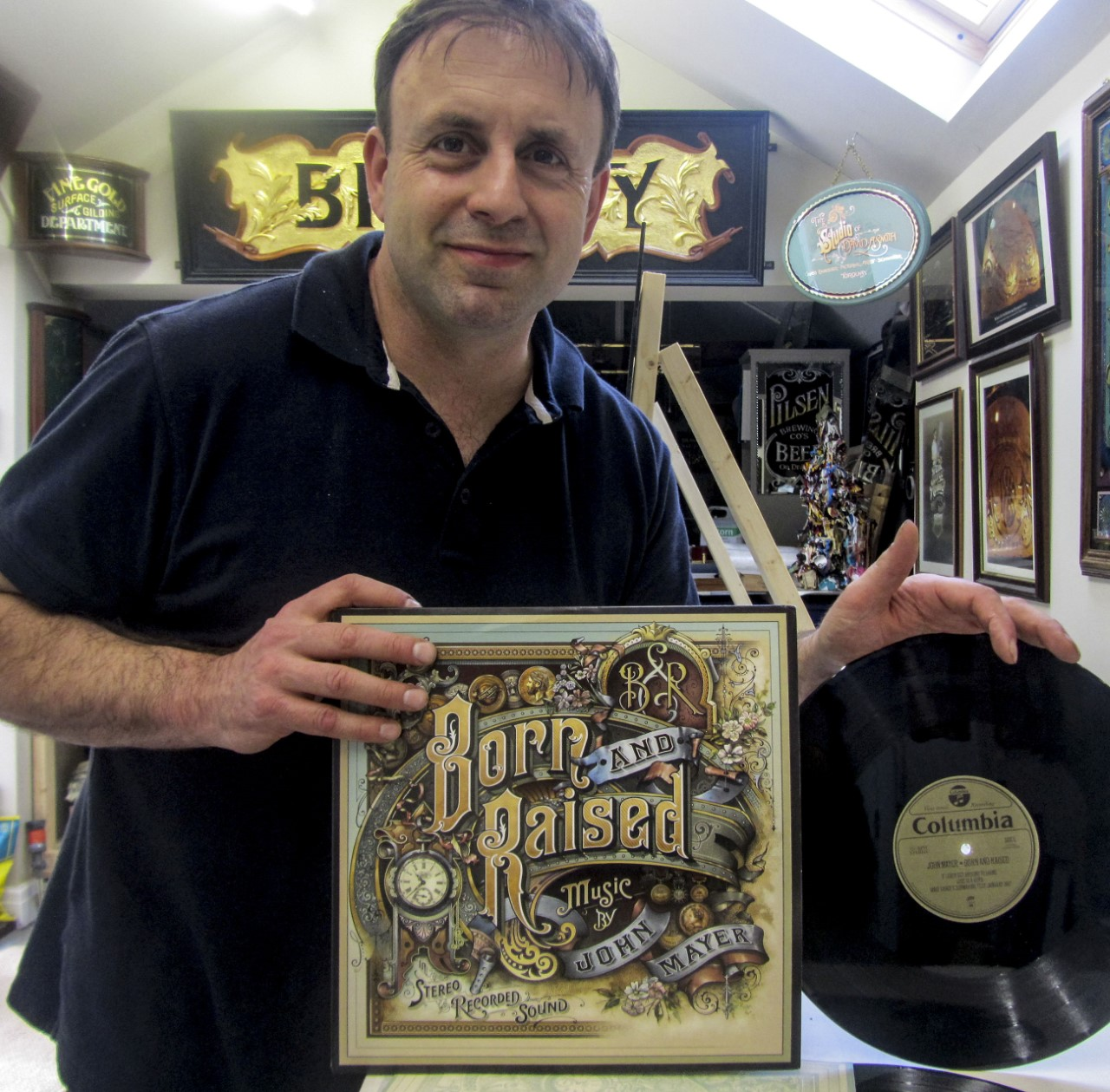
Born and Raised album cover

David Adrian Smith MBE (born 1968) is a British designer, glass embosser, gilder and signwriting artist based in Torquay, Devon, England.

He started his own sign writing company in 1990 and after 13 years sold the business in 2003 to concentrate more on hand crafted lettering and glass gilding. His main techniques include water and oil gilding, verre églomisé, acid etching, brilliant cutting, French embossing, glue chipping, sand blasting, screen printing and sign writing. In recent years David Smith has also focused on traditional, ornamental hand drawn design. He teaches the craft of sign writing and reverse glass gilding all over the world. He was awarded an MBE for services to reverse glass ornamental artistry in the 2020 New Year Honours.

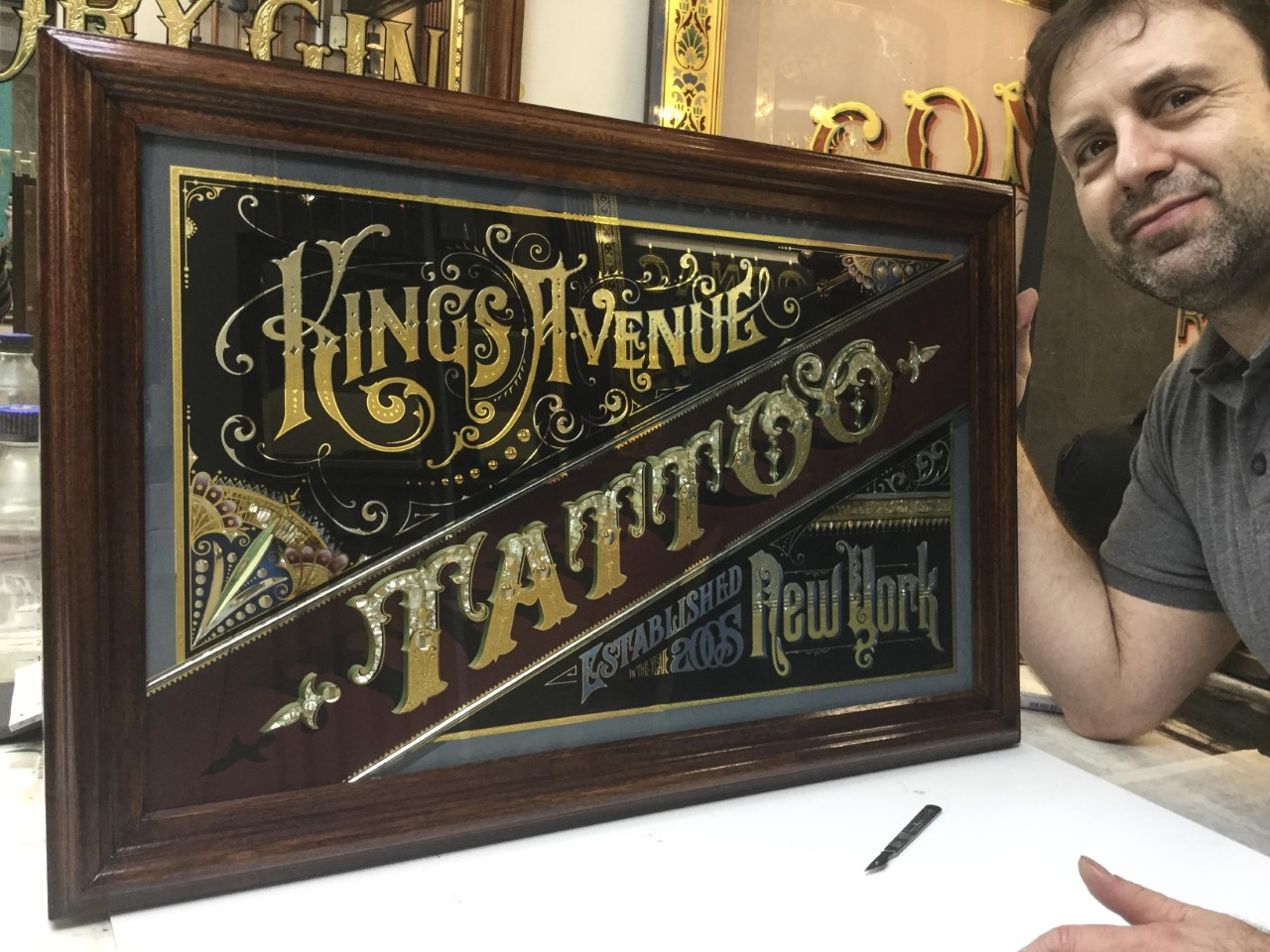
Reverse Glass Sign in 2015 for the Internationally renowned artist and founder of Kings Avenue Tattoo in New York, Mike Rubendall.

== Early life ==
David Smith was born in 1968 in Stroud, Gloucestershire. He moved to Torquay in 1978. In 1984, with help from his father, he began a traditional 5 year apprenticeship at Harmony Signs in Paignton, learning glass embossing and sign writing.

== Career ==
In 2012, Smith was hired by American singer songwriter John Mayer from Sony Music/Columbia Records to design an album cover for John Mayer's studio album Born and Raised. The cover was styled like a circa-1900 trade card. After completion, Mayer used the album-cover on the Ellen DeGeneres Show and the David Letterman Show. Besides the album cover, David Smith designed artwork for the single "Queen of California". He has also worked on posters and other merchandise associated with the album and single.

Also in 2012, David Smith was commissioned by Jameson Whiskey to design a St. Patrick's Jameson Whiskey bottle for the brand. The design, apart from being used on the limited edition bottle, was produced as a hand crafted mirror that can be seen at Jameson Experience, Midleton.

In 2013 Smith made gold leaf glass signs for the Burberry store in Regent Street in London. The Ginstitute on Portobello Road, London, has received ornate gilded advertising mirrors produced by Dave Smith. Later in 2013, the artist worked on an album cover for the band The Kings of Leon. The artwork was used for the single "Beautiful War" of their album Mechanical Bull. Other notable commissions in the music industry include artwork for the band The Grateful Dead (typography and poster) and Bernie Marsden's biography book cover (Whitesnake) Wheres My Guitar.

In 2015, Smith was invited to Disney World, Florida to talk and present to over 100 Disney Imagineers about his philosophy on design across Europe, as well as his Victorian style lettering he has become famous for. In 2015 Smith designed the bottle artwork for Booth's Gin.

In 2016, Smith made a commission for John Mayer and PRS Guitars to design a hand-signed sticker in the f-hole of a special Limited Edition run of Private Stock named the “Super Eagle” guitar.

In 2019, Smith hand designed the monograms for the Limited Edition guitars made for The Dropkick Murphys made by Duesenberg Guitars. In 2019 Smith created and designed the album cover for the Kris Barras Band's Light It Up.

Smith was appointed Member of the Order of the British Empire (MBE) in the 2020 New Year Honours for services to reversed glass ornamental artistry.
