= Live Stages =

Live album by Vertical Horizon
- Released: January 14, 1997
- Recorded: September 5–6, 1996
- Genre: Rock
- Length: 69:14
- Label: Rhythmic

Vertical Horizon chronology
| Running on Ice (1995) | Live Stages (1997) | Everything You Want (1999) |

Professional ratings
Review scores
| Source | Rating |
|---|---|
| Allmusic | 4/5 stars |

Live Stages is a live album by Vertical Horizon, released by Rhythmic Records in early 1997, and later re-released by RCA Records. This album was recorded live at Ziggy's in Winston-Salem, North Carolina. It featured mostly songs from the band's second album, Running on Ice, (and "On the Sea" from There and Back Again), as well as new material. This was the first Vertical Horizon album to feature Matt Scannell more prominently on electric guitar, and also the first to include drummer Ed Toth. Ryan Fisher played bass.

== Track listing ==
1. "The Man Who Would Be Santa" (Scannell) - 5:44
2. "The Ride" (Keith Kane) - 3:31
3. "Falling Down" (Kelly Moylan/Scannell) - 5:15
4. "On the Sea" (Scannell) - 6:24
5. "Japan" (Kane) - 4:52
6. "It's Only Me" (Scannell) - 5:00
7. "Candyman" (Kane) - 4:20
8. "Fragments" (Scannell) - 4:44
9. "The Unchosen One" (Kane) - 5:19
10. "Heart in Hand" (Scannell) - 7:12
11. "Wash Away" (Kane) - 12:23
12. "Great Divide" (Scannell) - 4:25
