= Burning the Days =

Studio album by Vertical Horizon
- Released: September 22, 2009
- Recorded: Los Angeles, California
- Genre: Alternative rock
- Length: 51:24
- Label: Outfall Records
- Producer: Matt Scannell

Vertical Horizon chronology
Go (2003)	Burning the Days (2009)	Echoes From the Underground (2013)

Singles from Vertical Horizon
- 1. "Save Me from Myself" Released: 2009; 2. "The Lucky One" Released: 2010

Burning the Days is the fifth studio album from the band Vertical Horizon, released on September 22, 2009.

== Background ==
Following the multi-platinum success of their 1999 album, Everything You Want, the members of Vertical Horizon were disappointed with what they felt was a lack of support from RCA in promoting their 2003 follow-up, Go. Go failed to gain any real support from RCA, but despite the label's lack of interest in Go, Vertical Horizon had difficulty getting released from its contract. Despite setbacks, the group and label severed their relationship when RCA merged with Sony Music in 2004, after which Vertical Horizon signed with Hybrid Recordings, where Go was re-released as Go 2.0 in 2005.

Shortly after the release of Go 2.0, longtime drummer Ed Toth announced he was leaving Vertical Horizon to join The Doobie Brothers.

== Recording ==
After an extended hiatus, work began on Burning the Days in 2007. Scannell took a different approach to the record by working at his home studio, and created his label, Outfall Records, to release Burning the Days. Though free of any external pressures, Scannell felt the need to be cautious with the recording: "You have the freedom to be a little creative when you're not working against the clock, but at the same time you can be a little too lenient, and spending an awful lot of time."

Scannell also worked with outside musicians while writing and recording Burning the Days, which included drummer Neil Peart from Rush, and singer/songwriter Richard Marx. Peart played drums on three songs: "Even Now", "Save Me from Myself" and "Welcome to the Bottom", and wrote the lyrics to "Even Now". Scannell asked Peart if he would be interested in playing drums on the song, and Peart responded, "No one else can play drums on it — I won’t let anyone else play drums on it. I have to play the drums on it." Marx played piano on "Here" and produced Scannell's vocals on two of the album's songs.

As with Go, longtime singer/guitarist Keith Kane is largely absent from Burning the Days, only being credited with performing harmony vocals on the album. Scannell has insisted that Kane's minimal involvement in the recording of the album was not due to any tension between the two, explaining that Kane's limited involvement has been a part of the changing dynamics within the group that's naturally progressed through the years starting with their first album: "[W]ith There and Back Again, the album was purposefully half Keith's songs and half my songs. And what started happening, quickly as we started progressing as a band, is that my output of songs just started greatly increasing. Keith’s input started slowing down, and I think that is evident with Running on Ice." Kane always stated contentment with his role in the band, and Scannell's as frontman; he stopped touring with the band in 2010 to work on solo projects.

According to an interview with Matt Scannell for Songfacts, he wrote "All Is Said and Done" about control freaks.

== Release ==
"All Is Said and Done" was first revealed on the band's MySpace page in November 2008. The album was released on September 22, 2009, on the band's label, Outfall Records. The lead single, "Save Me from Myself", was made available to download for free as an mp3 upon the album's release on their SellMerch page.

== Reception ==
Professional ratings
Review scores
Source	Rating
Allmusic	3/5 stars
Alternative Addiction	4.5/5 stars
Los Angeles Times	1.5/4 stars

The album's reception was mixed. AllMusic praised the album for its "immaculate production" and its progressive rock elements introduced on the tracks that featured contributions by Neil Peart. Alternative Addiction praised the album for its lyrics and guitar work, calling it "a perfect showcase for Vertical Horizon’s return to the spotlight, and could easily be one of the best albums of 2009." The Los Angeles Times was less enthusiastic, feeling that the album felt "flat and lifeless", and paled in comparison to Third Eye Blind's 2009 comeback album Ursa Major.

== Track listing ==
All songs written by Matt Scannell, except where noted.

1. "All Is Said and Done" - 4:23
2. "The Lucky One" - 3:54
3. "The Middle Ground" - 4:24
4. "I Believe In You" - 3:23
5. "Save Me From Myself" - 4:17
6. "Carrying On" - 3:36
7. "Back to You" - 3:33
8. "Can You Help Me" - 3:59
9. "Afterglow" - 3:58
10. "Here" - 3:41
11. "Welcome to the Bottom" - 5:47
12. "Even Now" (Scannell, Neil Peart) - 6:43

== Personnel ==
Vertical Horizon

- Matt Scannell - lead vocals, guitars, keyboards and programming
- Keith Kane - harmony vocals
- Sean Hurley - bass guitar
- Jason Sutter - drums

Additional personnel

- Neil Peart - drums on "Save Me from Myself", "Even Now" and "Welcome to the Bottom"
- Richard Marx - piano on "Here"
- Blair Sinta - drums on "Here"

Production

- Steve Hardy: Engineering, Mixing
- Joel Numa: Engineering
- Mark Valentine: Engineering
- Ted Jensen: Mastering
- Anik McGrory: Artwork
