= Go (Vertical Horizon album) =

Studio album by Vertical Horizon
- Released: September 23, 2003
- Genre: Alternative rock; pop rock
- Length: 45:07
- Label: RCA; Hybrid
- Producer: John Shanks

Vertical Horizon chronology
Everything You Want (1999)	Go (2003)	Burning the Days (2009)

Singles from Go
- 1. "I'm Still Here" Released: 2003; 2. "Forever" Released: 2005; 3. "When You Cry" Released: 2006

Alternative cover
- Re-release cover of Go 2.0

Go is the fourth studio album by alternative rock band Vertical Horizon. The album, a follow-up to the band's double platinum Everything You Want, continues to expand upon the band's alternative and pop rock sound while moving into more hard rock directions as well. Recorded in early 2002, the album was ready as early as that August, but was instead delayed extensively due to restructuring at the band's label, RCA Records. The album was released over a year later on September 23, 2003. The singles off the album were "I'm Still Here", "Forever", and "When You Cry".

The album was well received by critics, who praised the album for being enjoyable despite not being especially inventive, but did not perform well commercially, with it not charting within the top 60 in its first week, and failing to achieve any RIAA certification. The album was later re-released as Go 2.0 in 2005 on Hybrid Recordings, with a new track "Better When You're Not There" and rearranged track listing.

== Background ==
After the band's release of their double platinum album Everything You Want in 1999, the band had initially intended to record a follow-up right away. However, the band ended up touring in support of Everything You Want for about two and a half years at request of their label. The band took a break from touring in early 2002 to move to Los Angeles and start recording sessions for Go.

== Writing and recording ==
The Go sessions began after commencing the two and a half years of touring in support of Everything You Want in early 2002. Despite the band's origins as a duo where Matthew Scannell and Keith Kane split singing and songwriting duties, the band dynamic shifted to Scannell providing the majority of both for Everything You Want, and all of both for Go. The process started with Scannell writing material in solitude, and then presenting his ideas to the rest of the band. How developed song ideas were varied by the track; some, such as "Underwater", was only a loose outline of a song, where as the track "Forever", was almost fully realized. Once ample ideas were in place, the band would enter the rehearsal space, where the band worked on arranging the album, and either expanding or trimming segments of tracks.

Upon a couple of weeks of rehearsing, the band began recording alongside music producer John Shanks. The band first began by recording bass, drums, and guitars first, and then adding Scannel's vocals. However, the exception to the process was the track "Forever", which was added at the last minute in the initial recording sessions; where they started with Scannel's vocals and guitar, and then filled in the drums and bass afterwards. The band recorded a total of 16 songs for the album, but always envisioned paring it down to 11 or 12 for the final release.

An album's worth of material had been finished by August 2002. However, complications and delays arose due to issues with their record label, RCA Records, which was going through a major restructuring at the time. The band ended up under the jurisdiction the company's new CEO, Clive Davis. Davis did not approve of the band, with Scannell later recounting that "...it’s safe to say we were not Clive’s favorite band...It was a torturous time." The combination of RCA's troubles and Davis's low opinion would delay the album over a year, until September 2003. In that time, Davis also requested the band come up with a stronger first single, so the band continued to work on further material, which resulted in the album's first single "I'm Still Here". The album's production was wrapped up with mixing by Ben Grosse and Chris Lord-Alge along with mastering by Ted Jensen.

== Lyrical themes ==
The album's title reflects the band's "just go for it" mentality during the recording sessions. Part of the inspiration for this approach were the difficult Everything You Want sessions, where band members stressed out over every little detail of the album." The band resolved to go with their instinct rather that worrying excessively, something they felt they had honed through two and a half years of touring since the last time they had recorded in the studio." Scannell stated that, while none of the tracks overtly reference the September 11 attacks, the event did influence this mentality as well, having an important effect on his inspiration and emotions during the creation of the album."

"A lot of the themes in these songs are about taking control of your life and living it the way you want to live it, and acting and doing and not just talking and thinking about it. It's really important in the big sense in a post 9/11 world to make sure we all live our life in a way where we feel good about it. There are certainly messages within some of the songs at certain points on the album that deal with feelings of loss and those types of emotions, and also some feelings of, 'Hey, I want to get up and dust myself off and get on with my life. Both of those could be seen as viable and relevant reactions to 9/11."

== Musical style and composition ==
The album's sound is considered to be a continuation of Everything You Want's sound. Go has specifically been described as alternative rock and pop rock. Emphasis is placed on high production values with a highly polished and processed sound. A few tracks, notably "Sunshine" and "One of You", veer into a heavier, hard rock sound.

Most of the tracks are arranged in a conventional verse-chorus structure, although the track's final chorus typically contain an expanded variation both lyrically and instrumentally. Verses commonly contain acoustic guitar, clean electric guitar tones, and a bass and drum lead beat, while choruses commonly erupt into heavier distorted guitar and heavy bass notes played, commonly creating a loud-soft dynamic. Tracks commonly contain an outro instrumental interlude as well. A few tracks, most notably "Inside", prominently feature orchestration in the form of a string section as well.

== Release and promotion ==
Go was released on September 23, 2003. The band was featured on television on multiple instances during the album's initial week of release, including appearances on CBS Weekend, CNN, Fox News and WGN. The band also performed at the Experience Music Project, which was later aired in October on VH1. The band also promoted the release through a North American tour through mid-November, a South-Eastern tour after that, and then many radio-sponsored performances in December.

Despite the band's efforts, the album had a weak commercial impact, debuting at number 61 on the Billboard 200. The first single, "I'm Still Here", only peaked at number 17 on the Adult Top 40 as well. The band cited lack of support from their record label, with Scannell stating:

"Clive Davis had just taken over RCA Records and we knew he was not a fan of our band and certainly didn’t like me or our music much...We knew this album was going to virtually end up stillborn. I remember walking around to seven different record stores that day and finding only one copy of the new album."

On June 28, 2005, Hybrid Recordings, the label owned by Sony BMG, which bought out RCA in 2004 re-released Go as Go 2.0. The album featured a slightly altered track listing that included a previously unreleased track, "Better When You're Not There", and new cover art. After the re-release, "Forever" was released as a single; it reached no. 18 in the Billboard Adult Top 40 charts. The third and final single, "When You Cry", charted at No. 35. "Forever" also made the top 20 of the Billboard Hot AC chart, peaking at #17.

The album was also released in South Africa through Musketeer Records, where it charted in the top 10 album downloads from iTunes.

== Reception ==
Professional ratings
Review scores
Source	Rating
Allmusic	2.5/5 stars
Alternative Addiction	4/5 stars
The Daily Star	4.7 stars on a 5 point scale
Collegiate Times	(favorable)
Billboard	(favorable)

Reception for the album garnered mixed reactions by critics. AllMusic panned the album for sounding generic, stating it sounded like "insipid radio filler" and "soundtracks for Pottery Barn" and that it "reaffirms their status as third-tier imitators". Conversely, Alternative Addiction strongly praised the album for being "great from beginning to end, proving that Vertical Horizon is one of the few bands that still not only makes great songs, but great albums...This album might not be "Everything You Want" but its still pretty damn good." The album's "layered guitar-work" was cited as a standout element. The Daily Star similarly praised the album for being "a brilliant album with varied songs put together, with each of them fitting different occasions and moods." The Collegiate Times also praised the album for being "rock that's not going to scare away the children, but at the same time has enough backbone to satisfy a U2 or Collective Soul fan" and cited the track "One of You" as a standout track for fans of hard rock.

== Track listing ==
All tracks are written by Matt Scannell.

Go
No.	Title	Length
1.	"When You Cry"	3:31
2.	"I'm Still Here"	3:54
3.	"Forever"	4:28
4.	"Sunshine"	3:19
5.	"Goodbye Again"	4:44
6.	"Echo"	4:06
7.	"It's Over"	3:47
8.	"One of You"	3:34
9.	"Won't Go Away"	3:52
10.	"Inside"	5:20
11.	"Underwater"	4:32
Total length:		45:07

Japanese edition
No.	Title	Length
12.	"One Time Around"	4:00

Go 2.0 (reissue)
No.	Title	Length
1.	"When You Cry"	3:31
2.	"I'm Still Here"	3:54
3.	"Forever"	4:28
4.	"Better When You're Not There"	4:18
5.	"Goodbye Again"	4:44
6.	"Echo"	4:06
7.	"Sunshine"	3:19
8.	"It's Over"	3:47
9.	"One of You"	3:34
10.	"Won't Go Away"	3:52
11.	"Inside"	5:20
12.	"Underwater"	4:32
Total length:		49:25

== Personnel ==
Track numbers correspond to the tracklisting of Go 2.0.

Vertical Horizon

- Matt Scannell – vocals, lead and rhythm guitars, keyboards, programming
- Sean Hurley – bass guitar
- Ed Toth – drums, percussion
- Keith Kane – vocals, guitar

Additional musicians

- Patrick Warren – keyboards, chamberlin, string arrangements (tracks 3, 5, 11)
- John Shanks – keyboards, programming
- Shari Sutcliffe – orchestra contractor, project coordinator
- Joel Derouin – concertmaster (tracks 3, 5, 11)
- Mark Van Gool – guitar technician

Art and photography

- Justin Wolfe – art direction, cover photograph
- Matt Scannell – cover concept, all other photography
- Frank Ockenfels 3 – band photography
- Joe Augustine – project manager

Technical personnel

- John Shanks – producer
- Matt Scannell – additional production (track 4), engineer (track 4)
- Marc DeSisto – engineer (tracks 1, 3, 5–12)
- Jeff Rothschild – engineer (tracks 1–3, 5–12), assistant engineer (tracks 1, 3, 5–12), Pro Tools recording and editing
- Mark Valentine – assistant engineer (tracks 1, 3, 5–12), drum engineer (track 2), Pro Tools recording and editing
- Joel Numa – engineer (track 4)
- Kevin Mills – assistant engineer (track 2)
- Dan Chase – Pro Tools recording and editing
- Baraka – Pro Tools recording and editing
- Ben Grosse – mixing (tracks 1, 4, 6, 8–10, 12)
- Chris Lord-Alge – mixing (tracks 2, 3, 5, 7, 11)
- Chuck Bailey – mixing assistant (tracks 1, 4, 6, 8–10, 12)
- Keith Armstrong – mixing assistant (tracks 2, 3, 5, 7, 11)
- Ted Jensen – mastering

== Charts ==
Chart (2003)	Peak position
US Billboard 200	61
