= Born and Raised (John Mayer album) =

Studio album by John Mayer
- Released: May 22, 2012
- Recorded: April–September 2011; February 2012
- Studio: Electric Lady Studios, New York City; The Village, Los Angeles, California; Berkeley Street, Santa Monica, California; Ocean Way Recording, Hollywood, California
- Genre: Folk rock; country rock; Southern rock; Americana
- Length: 46:25
- Label: Columbia
- Producer: John Mayer; Don Was

John Mayer chronology
Battle Studies (2009)	Born and Raised (2012)	Paradise Valley (2013)

Singles from Born and Raised
- 1. "Shadow Days" Released: March 6, 2012; 2. "Queen of California" Released: August 13, 2012; 3. "Something Like Olivia" Released: November 5, 2012

Professional ratings
Aggregate scores
Source	Rating
Metacritic	73/100
Review scores
Source	Rating
AbsolutePunk	91%
AllMusic	3.5/5 stars
American Songwriter	3/5 stars
Billboard	(favorable)
The Boston Globe	(favorable)
Entertainment Weekly	B
The Independent	2/5 stars
Robert Christgau	(3-star Honorable Mention)
Rolling Stone	4/5 stars
Uncut	(7/10)

Born and Raised is the fifth studio album by American singer-songwriter John Mayer, released on May 22, 2012, by Columbia Records. It marked yet another change in Mayer's musical style, incorporating elements of folk and Americana, as well as influences from Bob Dylan, Neil Young, David Crosby, Stephen Stills, and Graham Nash. Its cover, as well as that of the single "Queen of California", was designed by David Adrian Smith.

Born and Raised received generally positive reviews from critics, who praised Mayer's technical skills as well as Don Was' production work. The first single "Shadow Days" was released on Mayer's blog on February 27, 2012, and was made available for purchase as a digital download on March 6, 2012. The second single "Queen of California" impacted Hot AC radio on August 13, 2012, and the third single "Something Like Olivia" impacted Triple A radio on November 5, 2012.

== Background ==
Mayer has stated that he began to gravitate towards new "musical ideals" during the Winter leg of the Battle Studies World Tour, and he credits listening to records by Bob Dylan and Crosby, Stills, Nash & Young (namely, the Neil Young album After the Gold Rush), as well as other Americana, as influential for this. He has expressed minor frustration at not being able to begin new musical pursuits as soon as he would have liked, due to commitments to complete the touring for Battle Studies.

Upon finishing the tour, and receiving backlash for controversial comments made in a Playboy interview, Mayer decided to step away from the media and out of the public eye for a while.

Early reports indicated that the follow-up to Battle Studies would be called Born and Raised and would be released in October 2011.

On September 16, 2011, Mayer posted on his blog that his new record, Born and Raised, was being delayed due to granulomas discovered in his throat. The granulomas were found next to the vocal chords and were treatable. Mayer described this as a "temporary setback" and that recording and mixing of Born and Raised was entirely finished except for a few remaining vocal tracks. He expected the album to be out in early 2012. He told, "I did a lot of therapy, like anti-acid reflux, and it didn’t work, then I went on vocal rest. No alcohol. No spicy food. No talking. Most of September I wasn’t talking at all. I’d have a Bluetooth keyboard, and someone would have an iPad to read what I type. I had to point to menus at restaurants. People look at me like I’m crazy."

On October 20, 2011, Mayer updated his fans about the treatment of his throat granuloma, announcing that he "had surgery this afternoon to remove it and am now on complete vocal rest for a month or more", during which he plans to "travel the country, look, and listen." Recovering from surgery, and after taking a road trip with friends through Middle America, Mayer moved to Bozeman, Montana.

On February 27, 2012, the first single from Born and Raised, "Shadow Days", was released. On February 28, 2012, Mayer released the track listing for the album and announced that Born and Raised would be released on May 22, 2012.

=== Artwork ===
The album cover and artwork for single "Queen of California" were designed in a turn-of-the-century, trade-card style by British traditional signwriter and designer David Adrian Smith. Known for his expertise in high-quality ornamental hand-crafted reverse glass signs and decorative silvered and gilded mirrors, Smith was commissioned by Columbia Records to collaborate with Mayer on the artwork, which took approximately one month to complete.

On August 8, 2022, during a Rise For The River Benefit concert aimed at supporting those affected by damaging floods in Montana, Mayer revealed the hidden meaning behind the clock featured on the album cover. Mayer shared that the clock, set to 10:38, holds personal significance to him due to his "obsession with time" and contemplation of his place in life. Mayer explained that if the average male life expectancy was a 24-hour day, then at the time he released the album, it was 10:38 AM in the entire day of his life. He further expressed that as he stood there on stage, it was metaphorically "about lunch time" in his life and encouraged others to reflect on the time of day in their own lives as a source of inspiration.

== Promotion ==
Promotion for Born and Raised was hampered by the return of his throat granuloma, and thus he was limited to only interviews. Mainstream promotion included interviews on Late Night with Jimmy Fallon and The Ellen DeGeneres Show, in which he described Born and Raised as his most "honest" and "cohesive" album. He also appeared as a musical guest on the Late Show with David Letterman, playing guitar with the house band. On May 10, 2012, the Clive Davis Theater hosted An Evening with John Mayer in which Mayer discussed Born and Raised and his career.

== Touring ==
In September 2011, Mayer was forced to cancel a small run of live dates upon the discovery of a throat granuloma. In spring 2012, he was scheduled to tour North America, but was forced to cancel the tour after being informed by doctors that his throat granuloma had returned. He has said that he is to undergo surgery again, but that he has "no choice but to take an indefinite break from live performing."

On January 16, 2013, Mayer performed on stage for the first time since April 1, 2011. He was joined by David Ryan Harris, Sean Hurley, Aaron Sterling, Ben Bullington, and Lil Jane & The Pistol Whips at the Emerson Theater in Bozeman, Montana. The concert was part of a benefit organized to help firefighters who battled the previous summer's Pine Creek Fire.

The Born and Raised World Tour began on July 6, 2013, in Milwaukee, Wisconsin. In November 2013, Mayer enjoyed the number one Boxscore on the Billboard chart, grossing a $2.3 million box-office from his first concert appearance in Brazil on September 19. The sold-out performance at São Paulo's Arena Anhembi had more than 30,000 in attendance.

== Reception ==
=== Commercial performance ===
Born and Raised was John Mayer's third number one album on the Billboard 200 in the United States, selling 219,000 units in its first week. The following week, it was again placed at the top spot, being Mayer's first album to spend more than a week in the top spot on the chart. In Canada, the album debuted at number one, selling 17,800 copies, making it Mayer's first number one album in Canada. The album also entered the UK album charts at number four. On September 12, 2012, Born and Raised was certified Gold by the RIAA, selling 500,000 copies. As of December 6, 2012, the album had sold 514,000 copies.

=== Critical reception ===
The album garnered generally positive reviews. The album was listed at #17 on Rolling Stone's list of the top 50 albums of 2012, saying "It's a shot at redemption that's as on target as anything he's done." People magazine stated, "This is a shimmering album, perfect for taking on the road in the glow of spring and summer." Billboard called the album "his most consistently satisfying release yet." Entertainment Weekly gave the album a "B," saying that the Laurel Canyon-inspired, "ramble-tamble style suits him."

== Track listing ==
All tracks are written by John Mayer.

No.	Title	Length
1.	"Queen of California"	4:10
2.	"The Age of Worry"	2:38
3.	"Shadow Days"	3:53
4.	"Speak for Me"	3:45
5.	"Something Like Olivia"	3:01
6.	"Born and Raised"	4:48
7.	"If I Ever Get Around to Living"	5:22
8.	"Love Is a Verb"	2:24
9.	"Walt Grace's Submarine Test, January 1967"	5:08
10.	"Whiskey, Whiskey, Whiskey"	4:39
11.	"A Face to Call Home"	4:45
12.	"Born and Raised (Reprise)"	2:01
13.	"Fool to Love You" (bonus track)	2:16

== Personnel ==
Musical personnel

- John Mayer – vocals, guitars, harmonica, keyboards, percussion, production
- Sean Hurley – bass guitar
- Aaron Sterling – drums, percussion
- Chuck Leavell – keyboards

Primary production personnel

- Don Was – production
- Chad Franscoviak – engineering
- Michael Brauer – mixing
- Manny Marroquin – mixing
- Martin Pradler – digital editing
- Bob Ludwig – mastering

Featured artists

- Chris Botti – trumpet on "Walt Grace's Submarine Test, January 1967"
- David Crosby – vocals on "Born and Raised"
- Jim Keltner – drums on "Something Like Olivia"
- Greg Leisz – pedal steel guitar on "Queen of California", "Shadow Days", "Whiskey, Whiskey, Whiskey", "Born and Raised (Reprise)"; lap steel guitar on "Born and Raised"
- Graham Nash – vocals on "Born and Raised"
- Sara Watkins – vocals and violin on "A Face to Call Home"

Additional production personnel

- Travis McGehee – engineering/mixing assistance
- Phil Joly – engineering assistance
- Pete Bischoff – engineering assistance
- Ian Shea – engineering assistance
- Jared Nugent – engineering assistance
- Scott Smith – engineering assistance
- Chris Owens – engineering assistance
- Chris Claypool – engineering assistance
- Patrick Spain – engineering assistance
- Ryan Gilligan – mixing assistance
- Chris Calland – mixing assistance

Additional personnel

- David A. Smith – artwork
- Danny Clinch – photography
- Roger Love – vocal consultant

== Charts ==
=== Weekly charts ===
Chart (2012)	Peak position
Australian Albums (ARIA)	1
Austrian Albums (Ö3 Austria)	19
Belgian Albums (Ultratop Flanders)	30
Belgian Albums (Ultratop Wallonia)	59
Canadian Albums (Billboard)	1
Danish Albums (Hitlisten)	1
Dutch Albums (Album Top 100)	1
Finnish Albums (Suomen virallinen lista)	49
French Albums (SNEP)	56
German Albums (Offizielle Top 100)	17
New Zealand Albums (RMNZ)	1
Norwegian Albums (VG-lista)	2
Scottish Albums (OCC)	7
Spanish Albums (Promusicae)	21
Swedish Albums (Sverigetopplistan)	13
Swiss Albums (Schweizer Hitparade)	9
UK Albums (OCC)	4
US Billboard 200	1
US Top Rock Albums (Billboard)	1

=== Year-end charts ===
Chart (2012)	Position
Australian Albums (ARIA)	97
Dutch Albums (Album Top 100)	26
US Billboard 200	43
US Top Rock Albums (Billboard)	10

== Certifications ==
Region	Certification	Certified units/sales
Australia (ARIA)	Gold	35,000^{^}
Canada (Music Canada)	Platinum	80,000^{‡}
Denmark (IFPI Danmark)	Platinum	20,000^{‡}
Netherlands (NVPI)	Gold	25,000^{^}
New Zealand (RMNZ)	Gold	7,500^{‡}
United Kingdom (BPI)	Silver	60,000^{‡}
United States (RIAA)	Gold	500,000^{^}
^{^} Shipments figures based on certification alone.^{‡} Sales+streaming figures based on certification alone.

== Release history ==
Region	Date	Format(s)	Label
Austria	May 18, 2012	CD, digital download, LP	Columbia, Sony Music
Germany	May 18, 2012	CD, digital download, LP	Columbia, Sony Music
Ireland	May 18, 2012	CD, digital download, LP	Columbia, Sony Music
Switzerland	May 18, 2012	CD, digital download, LP	Columbia, Sony Music
United Kingdom	May 21, 2012	CD, digital download, LP	Columbia, Sony Music
United States	May 22, 2012	CD, digital download, LP	Columbia, Sony Music
