= Echoes from the Underground =

Studio album by Vertical Horizon
- Released: October 8, 2013
- Genre: Alternative rock
- Length: 57:16
- Label: Outfall Records
- Producer: Matt Scannell

Vertical Horizon chronology
Burning the Days (2009)	Echoes from the Underground (2013)	The Lost Mile (2018)

Singles from Vertical Horizon
- 1. "Broken Over You" Released: 2013

Echoes from the Underground is the sixth studio album from the band Vertical Horizon, released on October 8, 2013. "Broken Over You" was released as the lead single. Rush drummer Neil Peart played drums on two of the album's tracks.

== Background ==
In 2010, shortly after the band's 2009 album Burning the Days, co-founder Keith Kane left Vertical Horizon to pursue solo projects. The band's other co-founder and frontman Matt Scannell turned to crowdfunding to financially support the creation of the new record. Supporters who put down money ahead of time were allowed first access to over two years worth of "making of", behind-the-scenes footage of the album's creation, and a copy of the album upon release.

== Writing and recording ==
Scannell wrote more than 50 songs over the four-year period of developing the album. While Scannell did not replace Kane after his departure, he did collaborate with artists he had worked with in the past. Drummer Neil Peart of the band Rush was once again recruited to record drums for two tracks on the album, one of which was "Instamatic", which Scannell ironically described as "Lyrically, it's just your average spy thriller/espionage/blackmail/love song". Peart also performed drums on the slow-paced, somber album closer "South for the Winter", despite initial reservations that it was not the type of song he would play on. Scannell persuaded him to play for that very reason, that he wanted to see a seasoned drummer play outside of his comfort zone. Scannell also reunited with Richard Marx, with whom he had worked on his Duo project, who co-wrote the opening track "You Never Let Me Down", and helped produce vocals for the track "Half Light".

== Concept and themes ==
The record is a loose concept album.

"South for the Winter" was initially going to be a song dedicated to troops overseas, but as the it developed, Scannell shifted it to more personal themes, and instead wrote "A Song for Someone" for US troops posted overseas.

== Reception ==
Professional ratings
Review scores
Source	Rating
AllMusic	3.5/5 stars
Melodic	4/5 stars

== Track listing ==
All songs written by Matt Scannell, except where noted.

1. "You Never Let Me Down" (Scannell, Richard Marx) - 4:02
2. "Broken Over You" - 4:51
3. "Evermore" - 5:14
4. "Song for Someone" - 5:15
5. "Half-Light" - 4:16
6. "Instamatic" - 4:46
7. "Consolation" - 5:19
8. "Lovestruck" - 5:52
9. "Frost" - 6:13
10. "I Free You" - 4:18
11. "South for the Winter" - 7:10
