= We Are (Vertical Horizon song) =

1999 single by Vertical Horizon

Single by Vertical Horizon

from the album Everything You Want
- B-side: "All of You"
- Released: April 26, 1999
- Length: 4:02 (album version); 3:44 (radio mix)
- Label: RCA
- Songwriter: Matthew Scannell
- Producers: Mark Endert; Ben Grosse

Vertical Horizon singles chronology
"We Are" (1999)	"Everything You Want" (1999)

Music video
- "We Are" on YouTube

"We Are" is a song by American alternative rock band Vertical Horizon. It is the first single from their third studio album, Everything You Want, and was released as the band's debut single. It had moderate success on modern rock radio.

== Track listing ==
European CD single
No.	Title	Length
1.	"We Are" (album mix short intro)	3:44
2.	"We Are" (alternative mix long intro)	4:02
3.	"All of You" (Madagascar mix)	3:24

== Charts ==
Chart (1999)	Peak position
Netherlands (Single Top 100)	93
US Alternative Airplay (Billboard)	21
