= Running on Ice =

Studio album by Vertical Horizon
- Released: April 7, 1995
- Recorded: 1994
- Genre: Acoustic music
- Length: 62:34
- Labels: RCA; Rhythmic Records
- Producers: John Alagía; Doug Derryberry; Matt Scannell

Vertical Horizon chronology
There and Back Again (1992)	Running on Ice (1995)	Live Stages (1997)

Professional ratings
Review scores
Source	Rating
Allmusic	3/5 stars

Running on Ice is the second studio album by the American rock band Vertical Horizon, released independently in 1995 and later re-issued by RCA. It was produced by John Alagía (John Mayer, Dave Matthews Band), Doug Derryberry, and Matt Scannell. Though still technically a duo and acoustic-based, Running on Ice featured many guest musicians (most notably Carter Beauford of the Dave Matthews Band on drums), giving the album a full-band sound. Derryberry also contributed keyboards and vocals. Two of the album's songs ("Wash Away" and "The Man Who Would Be Santa") appeared on the second Aware: The Compilation album.

== Track listing ==
1. "Heart in Hand" (Scannell) – 4:36
2. "Wash Away" (Keith Kane) – 4:30
3. "Fragments" (Scannell) – 3:47
4. "Famous" (Kane/Scannell) – 3:03
5. "The Man Who Would Be Santa" (Scannell) – 4:43
6. "Angel Without Wings" (Kane) – 4:19
7. "Answer Me" (Scannell) – 5:31
8. "Life in the City" (Scannell) – 4:13
9. "Japan" (Kane) – 5:24
10. "Call it Even" (Scannell) – 3:40
11. "Sunrays and Saturdays" (Scannell) – 3:33
12. "Candyman" (Kane) – 4:16
13. "Falling Down" (Kelly Moylan/Scannell) – 4:12
14. "Goodnight My Friend" (Scannell) – 6:33
