= Everything You Want (Vertical Horizon album) =

Studio album by Vertical Horizon
- Released: June 15, 1999
- Recorded: 1998
- Genre: Alternative rock; post-grunge; pop rock
- Length: 45:45
- Label: RCA
- Producer: Mark Endert; Ben Grosse; David Bendeth; Matt Scannell

Vertical Horizon chronology
Live Stages (1997)	Everything You Want (1999)	Go (2003)

Singles from Everything You Want
- 1. "We Are" Released: April 26, 1999; 2. "Everything You Want" Released: October 19, 1999; 3. "You're a God" Released: June 13, 2000; 4. "Best I Ever Had (Grey Sky Morning)" Released: January 8, 2001

Professional ratings
Review scores
Source	Rating
Allmusic	3/5 stars
Q	4/5 stars

Everything You Want is the third studio album by Vertical Horizon and its first major label effort. Released in 1999, it was a breakthrough album for the band. Four singles were released from the album. The second single, "Everything You Want", became one of the most played singles of 2000, reaching number one on the Billboard Hot 100. In 2001, the album was certified double platinum by the RIAA, having sold two million copies in the United States, making it the band's best selling album.

== Background ==
In the late 1990s, Vertical Horizon's indie albums began to attract record executives from several record labels. The band signed with RCA Records in 1998.

== Release and commercial success ==
The album was released on June 15, 1999. The album's first single was "We Are", which managed to reach the Modern Rock Tracks chart and peaked at no. 21. The album's second single was "Everything You Want". The song became a massive hit, reaching number one at the Billboard Hot 100 chart and the Adult Top 40 chart and becoming Billboard's Most Played Single of 2000. "Everything You Want" remains Vertical Horizon's most successful single. Two other singles from the album, "You're a God" and "Best I Ever Had (Grey Sky Morning)", were also hits; they peaked at 23 and 58, respectively, at the Billboard Hot 100 chart.

The album peaked at number 40 at the Billboard 200 albums chart and number three at the Billboard Top Heatseekers chart.

== Track listing ==
All songs written by Matt Scannell, except "Shackled" by Keith Kane.

1. "We Are" – 4:00
2. "You're a God" – 3:38
3. "Everything You Want" – 4:17
4. "Best I Ever Had (Grey Sky Morning)" – 4:30
5. "You Say" – 3:58
6. "Finding Me" – 4:32
7. "Miracle" – 4:22
8. "Send It Up" – 3:42
9. "Give You Back" – 4:22
10. "All of You" – 3:04
11. "Shackled" – 5:19

== Personnel ==
Vertical Horizon

- Matt Scannell – lead vocals (tracks 1–10), backing vocals, electric and acoustic guitars, keyboards, producer (tracks 2, 6)
- Keith Kane – lead vocals (track 11), backing vocals, acoustic guitars
- Sean Hurley – bass guitar
- Ed Toth – drums, percussion

Additional personnel

- Mark Endert – producer (tracks 1–3, 5–7), additional production (tracks 4, 8, 9), mixing (tracks 2–9), additional engineering, programming, editing, keyboards
- Ben Grosse – producer (tracks 1, 3–11), mixing (tracks 10, 11), engineering, programming, editing
- David Bendeth – producer (track 2)
- Tom Lord-Alge – mixing (track 1)
- Scott Gormley, Alan Mason, Jenny Knotts, Dan Jurow, John Siket, Mike Tocci, Glen Tavachow – recording assistants
- Michael Tuller – programming, editing
- Mark Dufour – programming, editing, drum technician
- Luis Resto – keyboards
- Jamie Muhoberac – keyboards
- Chris Sobchack – drum technician
- Ted Jensen – mastering
- Paul Angelli – mastering assistant
- John Heiden – art direction, art design
- Bunny Yeager – cover photograph
- Danny Clinch – band photographs

== Charts ==
=== Weekly charts ===
Weekly chart performance for Everything You Want
Chart (1999–2000)	Peak position
Australian Albums (ARIA)	66
US Billboard 200	40
US Heatseekers Albums (Billboard)	3

=== Year-end charts ===
Year-end chart performance for Everything You Want
Chart (2000)	Position
Canadian Albums (Nielsen SoundScan)	190
US Billboard 200	82

== Certifications ==
Certifications for Everything You Want
Region	Certification	Certified units/sales
Canada (Music Canada)	Gold	50,000^{^}
United States (RIAA)	2× Platinum	2,000,000^{^}
^{^} Shipments figures based on certification alone.
