= Queen of California =

Single by John Mayer

from the album Born and Raised
- Released: August 13, 2012
- Genre: Country rock; southern rock
- Length: 4:10
- Label: Columbia
- Songwriter: John Mayer

John Mayer singles chronology
"Shadow Days" (2012)	"Queen of California" (2012)	"Something Like Olivia" (2012)

Music video
- "Queen of California" on YouTube

"Queen of California" is the second single from American singer John Mayer's fifth studio album Born and Raised.

== Music video ==
The music video for "Queen of California" premiered on YouTube on July 30, 2012.

== Personnel ==
- John Mayer – vocals, acoustic and electric guitars
- Aaron Sterling – drums, tambourine, bongos
- Sean Hurley – bass guitar
- Chuck Leavell – piano, Wurlitzer
- Greg Leisz – pedal steel

== Charts ==
Chart (2012)	Peak position
Japan Hot 100 (Billboard)	74
US Bubbling Under Hot 100 (Billboard)	7
US Adult Alternative Airplay (Billboard)	2
US Adult Pop Airplay (Billboard)	40
US Hot Rock & Alternative Songs (Billboard)	38
US Rock & Alternative Airplay (Billboard)	38
