= Shadow Days =

Single by John Mayer

from the album Born and Raised
- Released: March 6, 2012
- Genre: Country rock; southern rock
- Length: 3:53
- Label: Columbia
- Songwriter: John Mayer
- Producers: John Mayer; Don Was

John Mayer singles chronology
"Perfectly Lonely" (2010)	"Shadow Days" (2012)	"Queen of California" (2012)

Music video
- "Shadow Days" on YouTube

"Shadow Days" is the lead single from American singer John Mayer's fifth studio album Born and Raised. It had moderate success, peaking at #42 in the United States and #49 in Canada.

== Music video ==
The music video for "Shadow Days" premiered on Vevo and YouTube on April 27, 2012. The video shows John Mayer in three places. One of them shows him walking around the countryside. Another one shows him walking in the cold forests of Idaho. The last one shows him driving in a car taking stops along Idaho highways and repairing his guitar in a local music store then proceeding to an unknown destination. He sings and plays the guitar in all three places at some point.

== Personnel ==
- John Mayer - vocals, acoustic, electric & resophonic guitars
- Aaron Sterling - drums, tambourine
- Sean Hurley - bass guitar
- Chuck Leavell - piano, Hammond B-3
- Greg Leisz - pedal steel

== Charts ==
=== Weekly charts ===
Chart (2012)	Peak position
Canada Hot 100 (Billboard)	49
Denmark (Tracklisten)	39
Japan Hot 100 (Billboard)	23
Netherlands (Dutch Top 40)	17
Netherlands (Single Top 100)	23
US Billboard Hot 100	42
US Adult Alternative Airplay (Billboard)	2
US Adult Contemporary (Billboard)	21
US Adult Pop Airplay (Billboard)	12
US Hot Rock & Alternative Songs (Billboard)	38
US Rock & Alternative Airplay (Billboard)	38

=== Year-end charts ===
Chart (2012)	Position
Netherlands (Dutch Top 40)	88
US Adult Alternative Songs (Billboard)	23
US Adult Top 40 (Billboard)	46

== Release history ==
Region	Date	Format
United States	March 6, 2012	Digital Download
United States	March 26, 2012	Hot/Mod/AC radio
