= The Lost Mile =

Studio album by Vertical Horizon
- Released: February 23, 2018
- Genre: Alternative rock; power pop; electronica; synth-pop
- Length: 57:49
- Label: Outfall Records
- Producer: Matt Scannell

Vertical Horizon chronology
Echoes from the Underground (2013)	The Lost Mile (2018)

Singles from The Lost Mile
- 1. "I'm Gonna Save You" Released: 14 February 2018; 2. "More" Released: 26 June 2018; 3. "Written in the Stars" Released: 22 December 2018

The Lost Mile is the seventh studio album by Vertical Horizon. The album was released exclusively on digital platforms on February 23, 2018. It was released by Outfall Records, the independent label headed by frontman Matt Scannell.

== Background and recording ==
In an interview with Billboard, Scannell describes The Lost Mile as "the most indulgent album I've ever made." The album marks somewhat of a departure from the band's established sound, both in terms of its focus on keyboards and in relation to the length of the songs - of which only one runs for less than four minutes. Scannell cited bands such as Depeche Mode, The Cure and New Order as influences, as well as the Cormac McCarthy novel No Country for Old Men. The album features a re-recording of "I'm Not Running," a song that was originally co-written and performed with American singer-songwriter Richard Marx. Marx provides backing vocals on the studio version of the song. The first single, "I'm Gonna Save You," was released on February 14.

== Track listing ==
All songs were written by Matt Scannell, except where noted.

No.	Title	Writer(s)	Length
1.	"I'm Gonna Save You"		5:46
2.	"Written in the Stars"		4:29
3.	"Lighthouse"		6:25
4.	"More"		4:52
5.	"Out of the Blue"		7:34
6.	"I'm Not Running"	Scannell, Richard Marx	3:57
7.	"Now"		5:51
8.	"True Illusion"		7:53
9.	"One Day"		4:54
10.	"Save Love"		6:08

== Personnel ==
Vertical Horizon

- Matt Scannell – vocals, guitars, keyboards, production, engineering, photography
- Sean Hurley – bass
- Ron LaVella – drums

Additional personnel

- Richard Marx – backing vocals (track 6)
- Joel Numa, Tom Weir – engineering
- Ben Grosse, Paul Pavao – mixing
- Ted Jensen – mastering
- Craig M. Renwick – photography
- Justin Wolfe – cover art
