= Epiphone Jack Casady Signature Bass =

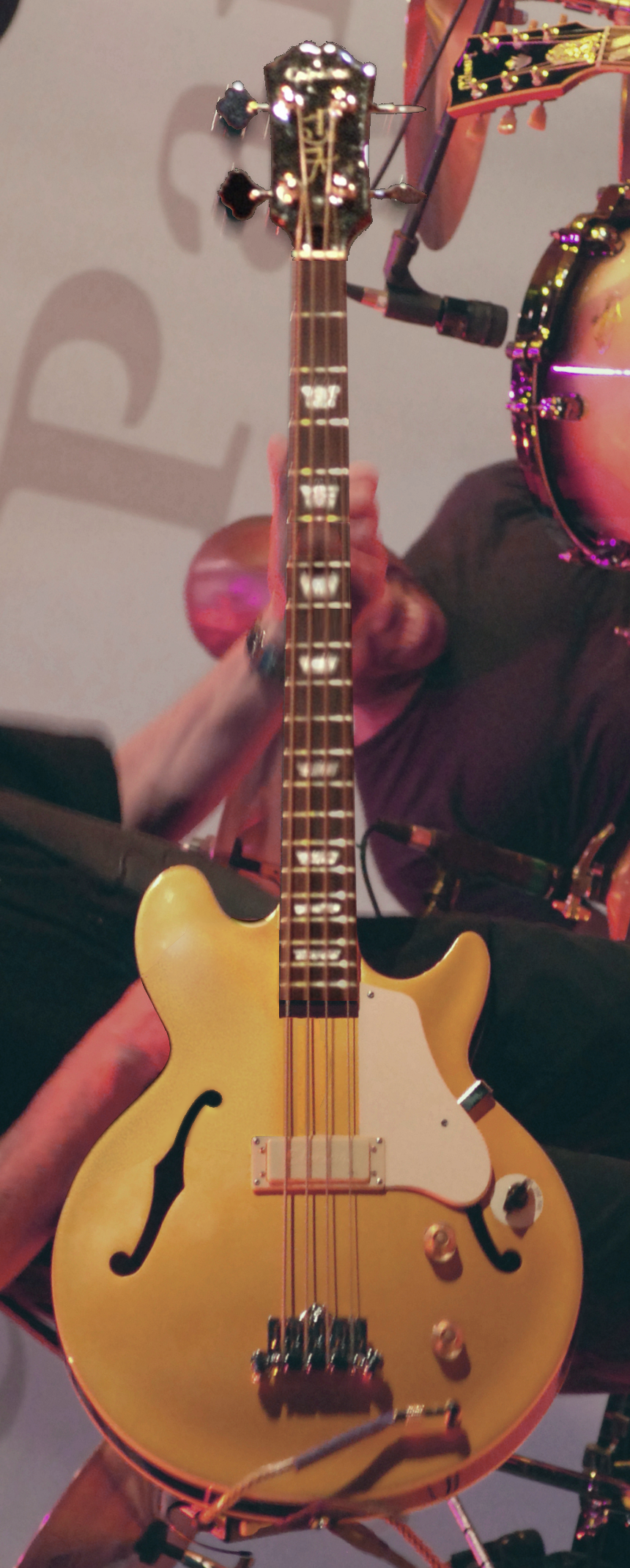
- Manufacturer: Epiphone
- Period: 1998-present

Construction
- Body type: Hollowbody
- Neck joint: Set
- Scale: 34"

Woods
- Body: Laminated maple top, back and sides, maple or mahogany centre block
- Neck: Maple or mahogany
- Fretboard: Rosewood

Hardware
- Bridge: Fixed
- Pickup: JCB-1 Low-Impedance humbucker

Colors available
- Sunburst, Cherry, Ebony, Natural,(2011: Pelham Blue - Limited Edition)

The Epiphone Jack Casady Signature Bass is a 4-string hollowbody bass guitar manufactured by Epiphone. Jack Casady approached Gibson (parent company of Epiphone) with the basic design, inspired by Casady's experience with the 1970s-era Gibson Les Paul Signature bass.

It is a maple body, mahogany neck, semi hollow bass guitar with a single low-impedance humbucking pickup. The pickup was designed to correct what Casady perceived as a weakness of the original Les Paul Signature bass, which was a lack of tonal definition in ensemble playing situations. The pickup is connected to a transformer with a three-position switch to select output impedance of 50, 250 or 500 ohms. The lower impedance values give clearer, more balanced tone while the higher impedances produce higher output with a more bass-heavy tonal profile.
