= You're a God =

2000 single by Vertical Horizon

Single by Vertical Horizon

from the album Everything You Want
- Released: June 13, 2000
- Length: 3:38
- Label: RCA
- Songwriter: Matt Scannell
- Producer: David Bendeth

Vertical Horizon singles chronology
"Everything You Want" (1999)	"You're a God" (2000)	"Best I Ever Had (Grey Sky Morning)" (2001)

Music video
- "You're a God" on YouTube

"You're a God" is a song by American rock band Vertical Horizon from their third studio album, Everything You Want. The single reached No. 23 on the US Billboard Hot 100. Two versions of the song exist: one featured on the album, the other featured in the music video and radio version, dubbed the "Pop Mix", mixed by Tom Lord-Alge.

== Background ==
Singer Matt Scannell said, "'You're A God' was written about when we give people in our lives power over us. It can be anything, whether it's a romantic thing or not - this one wasn't." He added that the song was partially inspired by a person in his life who had power over him and was making him miserable, and he realized all he had to do was stop looking up to them and start looking down on them, and he could take their power away. "And that's why that song starts off, 'I gotta be honest, we're covered in lies and that's okay.' ... Really, the title is ironic: you're a god and I am not – well, that's actually not true anymore, because now you're not a god." "You're a God" was included on the Bruce Almighty soundtrack released on June 3, 2003, by Varèse Sarabande.

== Music video ==
The music video (directed by The Malloys) was based around a beauty pageant contestant, played by actress Tiffani Thiessen.

== Charts ==
=== Weekly charts ===
Weekly chart performance for "You're a God"
Chart (2000)	Peak position
Australia (ARIA)	59
Canada Top Singles (RPM)	19
Canada Adult Contemporary (RPM)	41
Canada Rock/Alternative (RPM)	14
Netherlands (Single Top 100)	90
New Zealand (Recorded Music NZ)	50
UK Rock & Metal (Official Charts)	10
US Billboard Hot 100	23
US Adult Alternative Airplay (Billboard)	12
US Adult Pop Airplay (Billboard)	4
US Alternative Airplay (Billboard)	15
US Pop Airplay (Billboard)	11

=== Year-end charts ===
2000 year-end chart performance for "You're a God"
Chart (2000)	Position
US Adult Top 40 (Billboard)	27
US Mainstream Top 40 (Billboard)	51
US Modern Rock Tracks (Billboard)	74
US Triple-A (Billboard)	34

2001 year-end chart performance for "You're a God"
Chart (2001)	Position
US Adult Top 40 (Billboard)	31

== Release history ==
Release dates and formats for "You're a God"
Region	Date	Format(s)	Label(s)	Ref(s).
United States	June 13, 2000	Alternative radio	RCA	
United States	June 26, 2000	Hot adult contemporary; modern adult contemporary radio	RCA	
United States	July 18, 2000	Contemporary hit radio	RCA	
Australia	October 16, 2000	CD	RCA	
United Kingdom	November 13, 2000	CD	RCA	
