= There and Back Again (Vertical Horizon album) =

Studio album by Vertical Horizon
- Released: October 1992 (re-released 1999)
- Recorded: 1992
- Genre: Acoustic rock Folk
- Length: 40:13
- Label: RCA Records
- Producer: Matthew Scannell, Keith Kane

Vertical Horizon chronology
There and Back Again (1992)	Running on Ice (1995)

Professional ratings
Review scores
Source	Rating
AllMusic	2.5/5 stars

There and Back Again is the first album by Vertical Horizon, released independently in 1992, and later re-released in 1999 by RCA Records. At the time, the band consisted solely of Matthew Scannell and Keith Kane, who together did all the writing, singing, and producing for the album, as well as playing all instruments used (mostly acoustic guitar, with little percussion and bass). The name was taken from the subtitle of The Hobbit by J.R.R. Tolkien.

== Track listing ==
1. "Trying to Find Purpose" (Scannell) - 3:16
2. "Children's Lullaby" (Kane) - 5:20
3. "Footprints in the Snow" (Scannell) - 3:29
4. "Love's Light" (Kane) - 3:37
5. "The Mountain Song" (Scannell) - 2:51
6. "Prayer for an Innocent Man" (Kane) - 3:34
7. "Lines Upon Your Face" (Scannell) - 5:28
8. "Willingly" (Kane) - 4:46
9. "On the Sea" (Scannell) - 4:47
10. "Liberty" (Kane) - 3:05

== Personnel ==
Vertical Horizon

- Keith Kane – vocals, acoustic guitars, percussion, production, engineering
- Matthew Scannell – vocals, acoustic and electric guitars, bass guitars, keyboards, drum programming, production, engineering, photography

Additional personnel

- James Hemingway – digital editing and mastering
- Katie Symons – art direction
- Liz Green – art direction
- Amy Morse – cover photography
