= Vertical Horizon =

American rock band

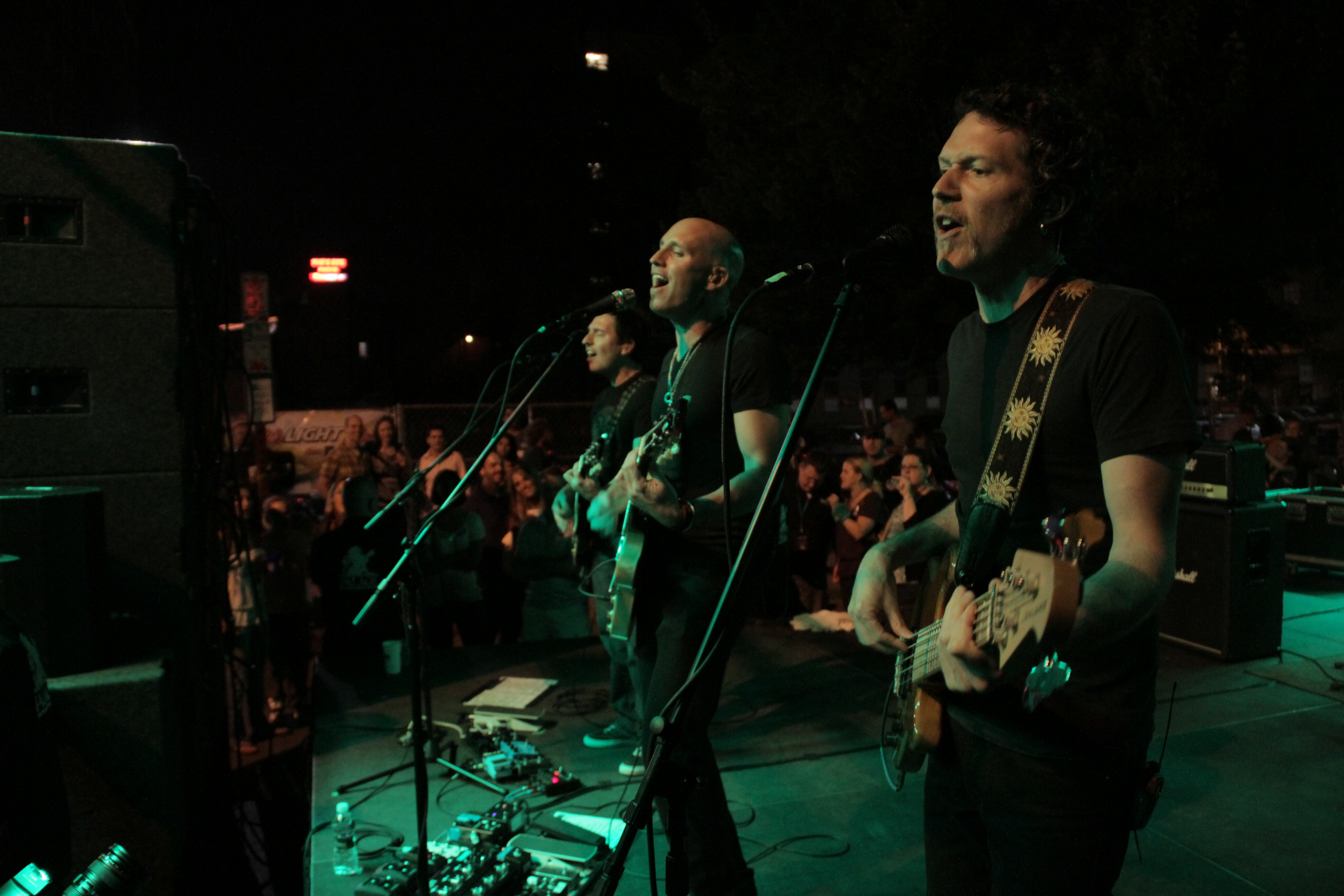
- Vertical Horizon performing in 2010

Background information
- Origin: Washington, D.C., U.S.
- Genres: Alternative rock; post-grunge; pop rock; acoustic rock
- Years active: 1991–present
- Labels: RCA; Outfall
- Members: Matt Scannell; Ron Lavella; John Wesley; Logan Tabor
- Past members: Keith Kane; Sean Hurley; Ed Toth; Steve Fekete; Jenn Oberle; Seth Horan; Ryan "Chopper" Fisher; Jeffrey Jarvis; Corey McCormick; Jason Sutter; Eric Holden; Craig McIntyre; Richie Noble; Donovan White; Andrew O’Brien; Jordan Brady; Mark Pacificar
- Website: verticalhorizon.com

Vertical Horizon are an American alternative rock band formed in Washington, D.C. in 1991. Vocalists and guitarists Matt Scannell and Keith Kane started the band when they were students at Georgetown University, later expanding the duo into a full four-piece band. Since the mid-2000s the group has undergone multiple line-up changes, with Scannell serving as the only constant member throughout. The band has released seven studio albums since 1992 – the most successful of which was their third, Everything You Want, which was certified double Platinum by the RIAA. Its title track is the band's signature song, having reached number one on the Billboard Hot 100 in 2000 – the only single of the band's to do so. The album also spawned two further Hot 100 entries, "You're a God" and "Best I Ever Had (Grey Sky Morning)".

== History ==
=== Early years (1991–1998) ===
Vertical Horizon was formed in 1991 by Georgetown University undergraduate students Matt Scannell and Keith Kane. In 1992 after graduating, the duo relocated to Boston to record and self-release their debut album There and Back Again. Scannell and Kane toured as a duo for the next few years, mostly appearing with similar bands such as Jackopierce, and settled back in the Washington, DC area to record their next album, 1995's Running on Ice, produced by John Alagia (Dave Matthews Band, John Mayer), Doug Derryberry, and Scannell. Drummer Ed Toth joined the band in 1996.

The band released a live album, Live Stages, in January 1997. In 1998, bassist Sean Hurley was invited to join Vertical Horizon. The band's indie albums began to attract record executives from several record labels during the late 1990s. The band signed with RCA Records in 1998. RCA re-released Vertical Horizon's independent albums, with new packaging and graphics. Before the RCA re-release, the band's first three albums had sold 70,000 combined units.

=== Everything You Want (1999–2000) ===
The band's first album with a major label was 1999's Everything You Want. It was a breakthrough album for the band. Four singles were released from the album. The album's first single was "We Are", which reached the Modern Rock Tracks chart and peaked at no. 21. The album's second single was "Everything You Want". The song became a massive hit, reaching number one at the Billboard Hot 100 chart and the Adult Top 40 chart and becoming Billboard's Most Played Single of 2000. As of 2022, "Everything You Want" is Vertical Horizon's most successful single. Two other singles from the album, "You're a God" and "Best I Ever Had (Grey Sky Morning)", were also hits; they peaked at 23 and 58, respectively, at the Billboard Hot 100 chart.

The Everything You Want album was certified double platinum by the RIAA.

=== Go and Go 2.0 (2001–2005) ===
Vertical Horizon's next album, Go, was released in September 2003. Go was released while RCA was going through a major restructuring and as a result, the album received little support from the label. The album's first single, "I'm Still Here", peaked at number 17 on the Adult Top 40. RCA did little to promote the album, leading Scannell to comment, "Without the label behind us, it just floundered and sort of withered on the vine, which is just a heartbreaker."

=== Burning the Days (2006–2010) ===
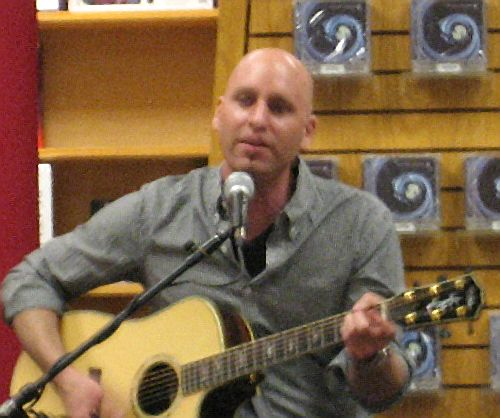
Matt Scannell performing at Borders in support of 2009's Burning the Days

Burning the Days was released on September 22, 2009, and was the group's first release after a five-year hiatus. Singer/songwriter Matt Scannell has said that Burning the Days marks a shift in his songwriting, both musically and lyrically. According to Scannell, "There is a lot more variety and quite a few different artistic moods on this record - almost different sonic landscapes... a lot of these songs feel like a faster tempo than anything we’ve ever done before."

Neil Peart of the Canadian rock band Rush played drums on three songs on the album: "Save Me From Myself", "Welcome to the Bottom", and "Even Now", which was co-written by Scannell and Peart, with Peart writing the lyrics and Scannell writing the music.

On June 3, 2010, Keith Kane confirmed his departure from the band.

=== Echoes from the Underground and The Lost Mile (2011–present) ===
Vertical Horizon announced in June 2011 that they had begun recording material for a new album. Echoes from the Underground was released on October 8, 2013.

In June 2017, Scannell announced at a concert in Fairfax, Virginia, that another album, the band's seventh, was forthcoming. The Lost Mile, came out on February 23, 2018.

Vertical Horizon issued the single "Last Night of Our Lives" on February 27, 2026. During a performance at the Minnesota State Fair on August 27, 2026, Scannell announced that Vertical Horizon would be releasing two new albums in 2027. This will be the band's eighth and ninth albums of their career.

== Members ==
Current

- Matt Scannell – lead vocals, lead guitar (1990–present)
- Ron Lavella – drums, percussion, backing vocals (2009–present)
- John Wesley – rhythm guitar, backing vocals (2021–present)
- Logan Tabor – bass, backing vocals (2024–present)

Former

- Keith Kane – backing and lead vocals, rhythm guitar (1990–2010)
- Ryan "Chopper" Fisher – bass (1994–1997)
- Ed Toth – drums, percussion (1996–2005)
- Seth Horan – bass, backing vocals (1997–1998)
- Sean Hurley – bass, backing vocals (1998–2009, session in 2013 and 2018)
- Steve Fekete – rhythm guitar, backing and lead vocals (2009–2012)
- Jenn Oberle – bass, backing vocals (2011–2012)
- Jeffrey Jarvis – bass, backing vocals (2013–2016)
- Donovan White – rhythm guitar, backing vocals (2012–2021)
- Mark Pacificar – bass, backing vocals (2016–2024)

Former touring musicians

- Jason Sutter – drums (also studio) (2009–2010)
- Corey McCormick – bass guitar (2009–2010)
- Eric Holden – bass, backing vocals (2009–2011)
- Jason Orme – rhythm guitar, backing vocals (2011–2012)
- Cedric LeMoyne – bass, backing vocals (2011–2012)
- Matthew Robbins – rhythm guitar (2015–2018)

Timeline

== Discography ==
Studio albums

- There and Back Again (1992)
- Running on Ice (1995)
- Everything You Want (1999)
- Go (2003)
- Burning the Days (2009)
- Echoes from the Underground (2013)
- The Lost Mile (2018)
