= Everything You Want (Vertical Horizon song) =

1999 single by Vertical Horizon

Single by Vertical Horizon

from the album Everything You Want
- B-side: "The Man Who Would Be Santa"; "You're a God"
- Released: October 19, 1999
- Genre: Pop rock; soft rock; alternative rock
- Length: 4:17 (album version); 4:06 (radio mix)
- Label: RCA; BMG
- Songwriter: Matthew Scannell
- Producers: Mark Endert; Ben Grosse

Vertical Horizon singles chronology
"We Are" (1999)	"Everything You Want" (1999)	"You're a God" (2000)

Music video
- "Everything You Want" on YouTube

"Everything You Want" is a song by American alternative rock band Vertical Horizon, the title track and second single from their third studio album. First released to alternative radio in October 1999, the single reached the top of the US Billboard Hot 100 on July 15, 2000, following a commercial release on June 27, 2000. It also peaked atop the Billboard Adult Top 40 and was Billboard's "Most Played Single" of 2000. It remains the band's most successful single.

== Composition ==
In 2009, lead vocalist Matt Scannell said he "still experience[d] joy" singing "Everything You Want" because he knew "it came from a true place". The song deals with unrequited love, and Scannell explained its background in a 2010 interview:

I was in love with this girl, and she was just a broken person. She kept turning to everyone except me for love and acceptance, and I wanted so much to help her. I wanted to be the one to give her everything she wanted, but I couldn't. She just couldn't accept it from me, and it was that pain, that led me to creating the song.

Scannell later elaborated on its meaning in a 2024 interview, stating that it was also about being stuck in a friend zone:

"Everything You Want" is really about a woman. We were young and trying to figure out what love meant. And she was continually looking at what I thought and continued to think were the wrong people. She would come and sort of cry on my shoulder when they inevitably treated her poorly. And the whole time, I was pining for her. I just loved her. I wanted to be there for her, to be with her, to be more than a friend for her, and it just wasn't in the cards. I could see it in her eyes every time we would talk. I was very much in the friend zone with her. So the only way that I could talk about it was by writing a song about it. I actually believe that she doesn't know that that song was written about her. I'm perfectly happy with that.

== Music video ==
A music video for the single was directed by Clark Eddy in Los Angeles. Throughout the video, a split screen effect depicts two versions of Scannell acting differently in mirror environments. Lyrics flash across the screen as the band performs the song in a bright, illuminated room with black, vertical pinstripes. Couples are shown arguing, with various messages appearing across the screen such as "every six seconds you think about sex" and "there are two sides to every story." Finally, the view blurs with a message reading "everything you want is not everything you need" as the video comes to a close.

In January 2000, the video was chosen as "Inside Track" of the month by VH1.

== Track listings ==
US CD single

1. "Everything You Want" (radio mix) – 4:06
2. "The Man Who Would Be Santa" (live) – 5:33

US 7-inch single

A. "Everything You Want" (radio mix) – 4:06
B. "You're a God" (radio mix) – 3:48

European and Australian CD single

1. "Everything You Want" (modern rock mix) – 4:06
2. "The Man Who Would Be Santa" (live edit version) – 5:33
3. "Heart in Hand" (live edit version) – 5:46

== Charts ==
=== Weekly charts ===
Chart (2000–2001)	Peak position
Australia (ARIA)	24
Canada Top Singles (RPM)	6
Canada Adult Contemporary (RPM)	45
Canada Rock/Alternative (RPM)	1
Iceland (Íslenski Listinn Topp 40)	33
Netherlands (Dutch Top 40 Tipparade)	14
Netherlands (Single Top 100)	96
New Zealand (Recorded Music NZ)	23
Scottish Singles Sales (Official Charts)	45
UK Singles (Official Charts)	42
UK Rock & Metal (Official Charts)	8
US Billboard Hot 100	1
US Adult Alternative Airplay (Billboard)	2
US Adult Pop Airplay (Billboard)	1
US Alternative Airplay (Billboard)	5
US Pop Airplay (Billboard)	2

=== Year-end charts ===
Chart (2000)	Position
US Billboard Hot 100	5
US Adult Top 40 (Billboard)	2
US Mainstream Top 40 (Billboard)	1
US Modern Rock Tracks (Billboard)	17
US Triple-A (Billboard)	3

Chart (2001)	Position
US Adult Top 40 (Billboard)	46

=== Decade-end charts ===
Chart (2000–2009)	Position
US Billboard Hot 100	55

== Release history ==
Region	Date	Formats(s)	Label(s)	Ref(s).
United States	October 19, 1999	Alternative radio	RCA	
United States	November 1, 1999	Hot adult contemporary; modern adult contemporary radio	RCA	
United States	November 16, 1999	Contemporary hit radio	RCA	
United States	June 27, 2000	7-inch vinyl; CD	RCA	
Europe	July 2000	CD	RCA; BMG	
United Kingdom	August 14, 2000	CD; cassette	RCA; BMG	

== See also ==
- List of Billboard Hot 100 number ones of 2000
