= Ed Toth =

American musician

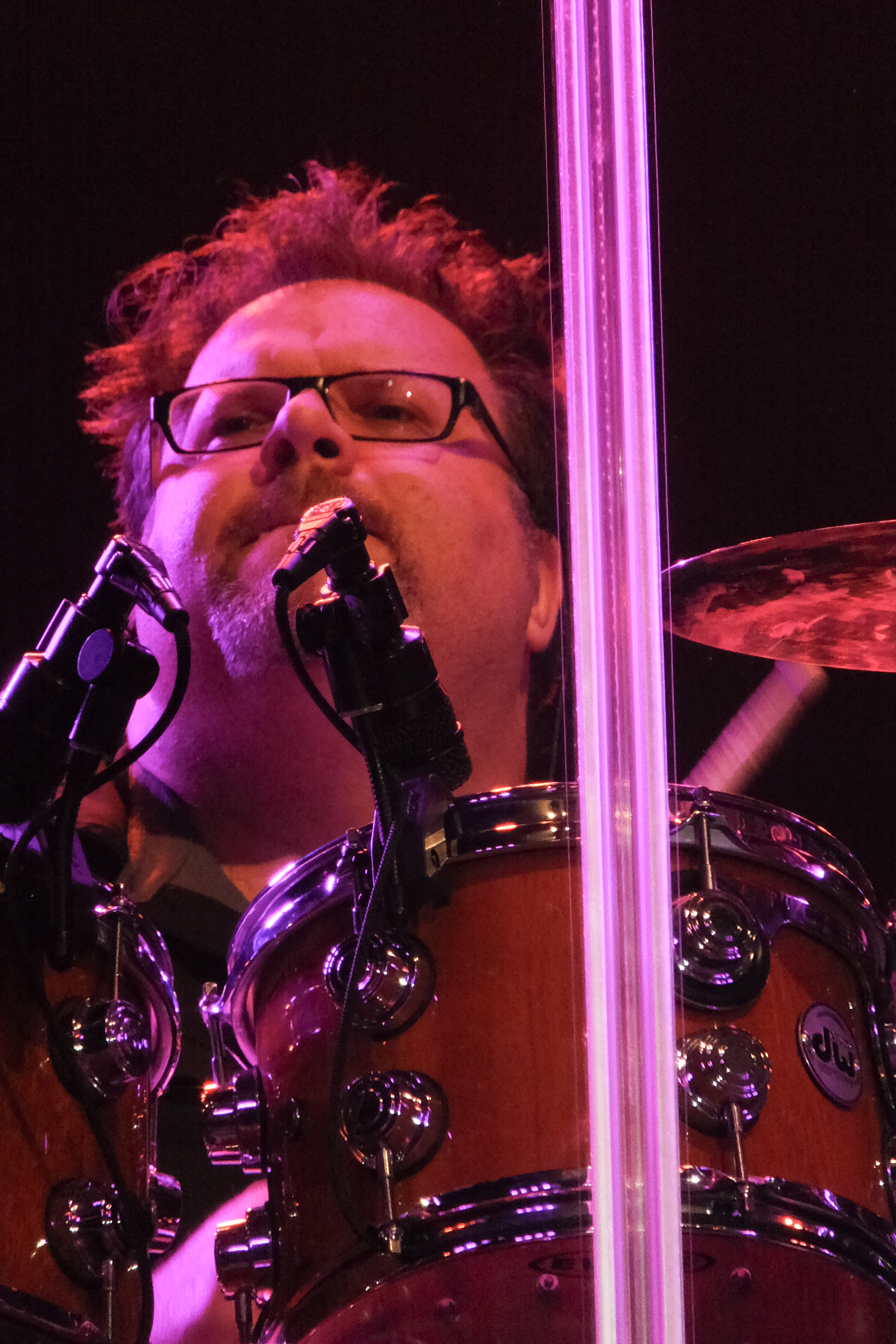
- Toth with The Doobie Brothers in 2013

Background information
- Born: Edward Arthur Toth
- Genres: Rock
- Occupation: Rock musician
- Instrument: Drums
- Years active: 1996–present

Edward Arthur Toth is an American musician and drummer for The Doobie Brothers, an American rock band. Toth joined the Doobie Brothers in 2005 following his departure from Vertical Horizon.

== Early life ==
Toth says that he has been drumming most of his life. He made good use of his father's record collection and was active in all music programs in East Lyme, Connecticut, playing in his high school band at East Lyme High School.

== Education ==
He went on to attend the University of Miami's Frost School of Music, where he received a Bachelor of Music degree in 1994. While still at the University of Miami, Toth became a member of the funk and rock band Jennifer Culture.

Toth says he has been influenced by Stewart Copeland, Neil Peart, Bill Bruford, and a host of other drummers. He has also produced some critically acclaimed albums and started a band called Cooper along with friend Tim Bradshaw.

=== Vertical Horizon ===
Toth has played in numerous other rock and funk bands over the last decade. Most notably, he was a member of Vertical Horizon from 1996 to 2005, which yielded a multi platinum album Everything You Want, the title track of which also charted #1. Toth's association with the group began when he was working at a Boston Borders Books; The mother of Vertical Horizon's lead singer and guitarist Matt Scannell was shopping in the bookstore and met Ed, who asked for a Vertical Horizon CD. He listened to the CD and quite enjoyed it. His enthusiasm for the recording impressed Scannell's mother so much that, in gratitude for the assistance she received at the store, she offered to put the bookstore manager and a friend on the guest list for a Vertical Horizon show at Mama Kin, an Aerosmith-owned nightclub in Boston. Toth went to the show as the manager's friend, and when the band had an opening for a drummer Toth auditioned for the spot.

=== Doobie Brothers ===
Toth is the fifth and current drummer for the Doobie Brothers, joining in 2005. The band had two drummers for much of their existence, but Toth became the sole drummer in 2016.
