= Matt Scannell =

American singer (born 1970)

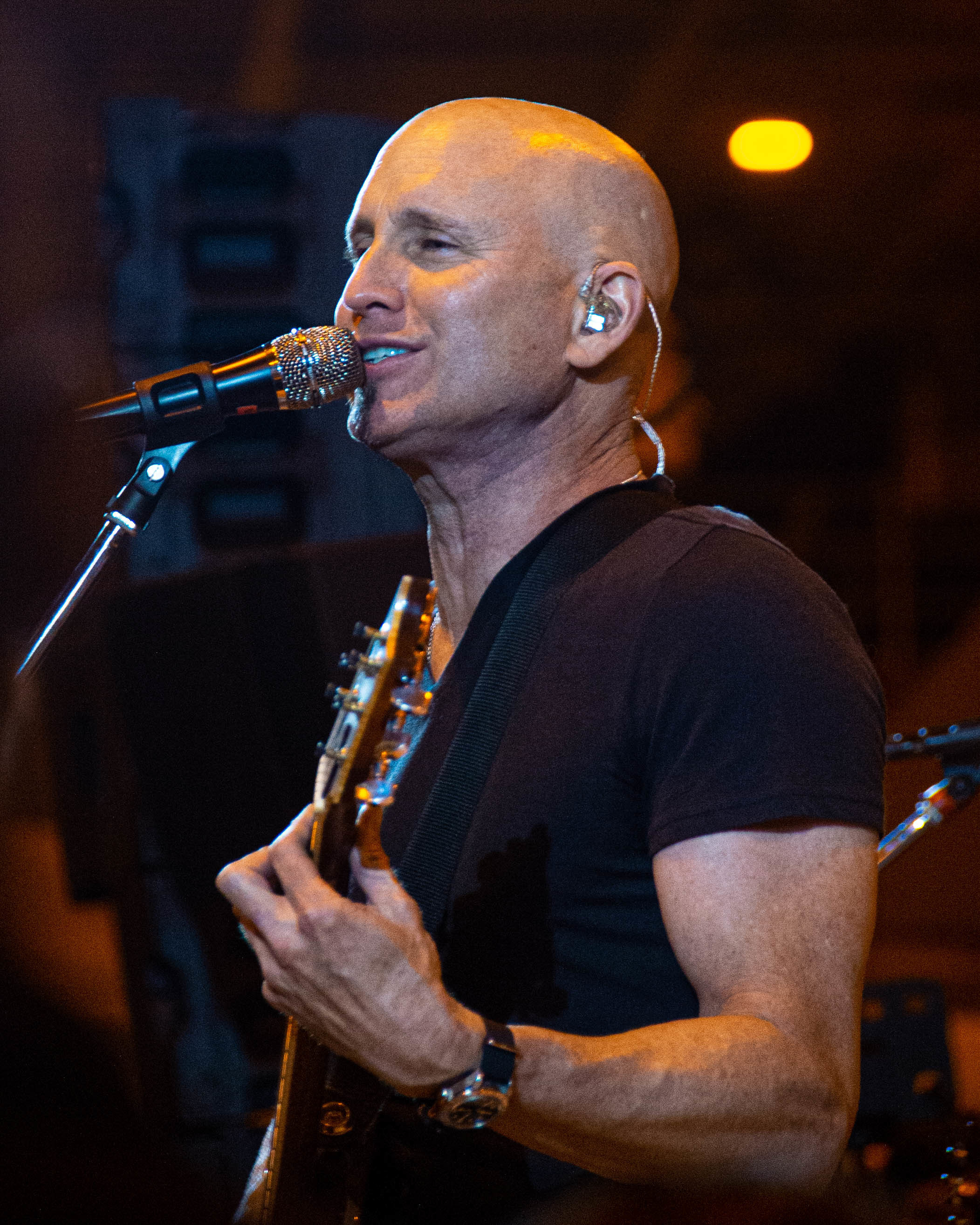
- Scannell in 2022

Background information
- Born: Matthew Bennett Scannell; 1970 (age 55–56); Worcester, Massachusetts, U.S.
- Origin: Washington, D.C., U.S.
- Occupations: Singer; songwriter; guitarist; multi-instrumentalist
- Instruments: Vocals; guitar; keyboards; piano; synthesizer; drums
- Years active: 1990–present
- Member of: Vertical Horizon

Matthew Bennett Scannell (born 1970) is an American musician. Scannell is the lead vocalist, lead guitarist, primary songwriter, and founding member of the alternative rock band Vertical Horizon.

== Early life and education ==
Scannell is a native of Worcester, Massachusetts. He was given his first guitar when he was seven years old. Scannell attended high school at Deerfield Academy in Deerfield, Massachusetts.

Scannell enrolled at Georgetown University in Washington D.C. after graduation from high school. In 1992, Scannell received a bachelor's degree in psychology from Georgetown University.

== Career ==
In 1990, Scannell and another Georgetown student, Keith Kane, formed the band Vertical Horizon. The two began performing in Washington clubs in October 1991.

The duo released their first album, There and Back Again, in 1992 after graduation from Georgetown. Scannell has since appeared as the lead vocalist of all of Vertical Horizon's albums.

Singer Richard Marx and Scannell collaborated to release the albums Duo in 2008 and Duo Live in 2010. On June 8, 2011, Scannell appeared at the Arcada Theatre in St. Charles, Illinois, with actor Hugh Jackman. Scannell and Jackman were invited to perform as guests of Marx.
