= Richard Marx discography =

Discography of American musician Richard Marx

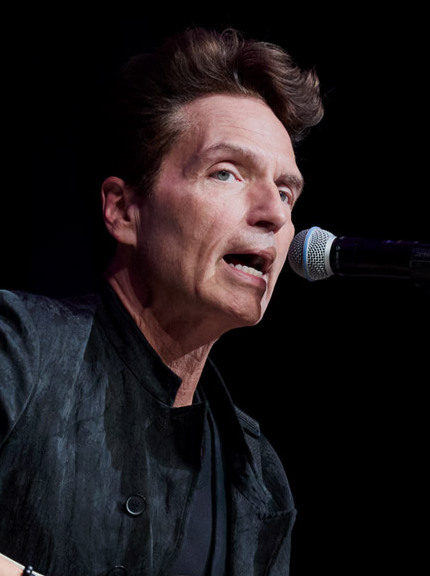
- Studio albums: 14
- Extended plays: 5
- Live albums: 3
- Compilation albums: 13
- Singles: 77
- Video albums: 1
- Music videos: 49
- Lyric videos: 9
- Promotional albums: 4
- Unofficial albums: 2

The following is a discography for American singer-songwriter and record producer and arranger, Richard Marx. It includes the list of 14 studio albums (including a Holiday album Christmas Spirit), 13 compilation albums, 3 live albums and 75 single releases, and along with chart rankings for each album and single and RIAA (and International) certifications for the albums.

== Albums ==
=== Studio albums ===
List of albums, with selected chart positions
Title	Album details	Peak chart positions										Certifications
Title	Album details	US	AUS	GER	JPN	NL	NZ	NOR	SWE	SWI	UK	Certifications
Richard Marx	Released: June 15, 1987; Label: Manhattan, EMI; Format: CD, LP, CS	8	7	—	—	—	45	—	34	—	68	US: 3× Platinum; AUS: Gold
Repeat Offender	Released: May 2, 1989; Label: EMI; Format: CD, LP, CS	1	1	9	32	18	3	10	7	7	8	US: 4× Platinum; AUS: 2× Platinum
Rush Street	Released: November 5, 1991; Label: Capitol; Format: CD, LP, CS	35	11	33	29	69	31	12	27	17	7	US: Platinum; AUS: Platinum
Paid Vacation	Released: February 8, 1994; Label: Capitol; Format: CD, CS	37	2	18	15	70	—	9	6	7	11	US: Platinum; JPN: Gold
Flesh and Bone	Released: April 8, 1997; Label: Capitol; Format: CD, CS	70	—	52	16	—	—	—	58	24	—	
Days in Avalon	Released: October 24, 2000; Label: Signal 21 Records; Format: CD, digital download	—^{[A]}	—	—	—	—	—	—	—	—	—	
My Own Best Enemy	Released: August 10, 2004; Label: Manhattan; Format: CD, digital download	126	—	—	—	—	—	—	—	—	—	
Emotional Remains	Released: October 31, 2008; Label: Zanzibar Records; Format: CD, digital download	—	—	—	—	—	—	—	—	—	—	
Sundown	Released: October 31, 2008; Label: Zanzibar Records; Format: CD, digital download	—	—	—	—	—	—	—	—	—	—	
Christmas Spirit	Released: October 22, 2012; Label: Zanzibar Records, TourDForce; Format: CD, digital download	181^{[B]}	—	—	—	—	—	—	—	—	—	
Beautiful Goodbye	Released: July 8, 2014; Label: Zanzibar Records; Format: CD, digital download	39^{[C]}	—	—	—	—	—	—	—	—	—	
Limitless	Released: February 7, 2020; Label: BMG; Format: CD, digital download	—	77	91	—	—	—	—	—	64	—	
Songwriter	Released: September 30, 2022; Label: BMG; Format: CD, digital download	—	—	95	—	—	—	—	—	68	—	
After Hours	Released: January 16, 2026; Label: Richard Marx Inc.; Format: CD, digital download	—^{[D]}	88^{[E]}	—	—	—	—	—	—	—	—	
"—" denotes album that did not chart or was not released

Notes

- A Days in Avalon reached number 41 on the Billboard Top Independent Albums chart.
- B Christmas Spirit also reached number 10 on the Billboard Top Independent Albums chart and number 21 on the Billboard Top Holiday Albums chart.
- C Beautiful Goodbye also reached number 6 on the Billboard Top Independent Albums chart.
- D After Hours reached number 14 on Billboard's Traditional Jazz Albums chart and number 18 on Billboard's Jazz Albums chart.
- E After Hours also reached number 1 on the ARIA Jazz & Blues Albums chart.

=== Compilation albums ===
List of albums, with selected chart positions
Title	Album details	Peak chart positions						Certifications
Title	Album details	US	AUS	NZ	NOR	SWE	UK	Certifications
Ballads	Released: August 10, 1994; Label: Toshiba EMI; Format: CD	—	—	—	—	—	—	
Greatest Hits	Released: November 4, 1997; Label: Capitol; Format: CD	140	—	18	2	13	34	US: Gold
The Best of Richard Marx	Released: October 2000; Label: EMI; Format: CD	—	—	—	—	—	—	
The Essential Richard Marx	Released: October 2000; Label: EMI Gold; Format: CD	—	—	—	—	—	—	
Timeline	Released: 2000; Label: Signal 21 Records; Format: CD	—	—	—	—	—	—	
Duo	with Matt Scannell; Released: May 12, 2008; Label: Zanzibar Records; Format: CD, digital download	—	—	—	—	—	—	
Stories to Tell	Released: March 2010/November 2010/May 2011; Label: Zanzibar Records/ Wrasse Records/ TourDForce; Format: CD, digital download	—^{[F]}	—	—	—	—	—	
Hits & Ballads	Released: April 2, 2010; Label: EMI; Format: 2×CD	—	—	—	—	—	—	
Inside My Head	Released: June 1, 2012; Label: Frontiers Records; Format: CD, digital download	—	—	—	—	—	—	
Seven & Seven	Released: December 6, 2012; Label: Zanzibar Records/TourDForce; Format: CD	—	—	—	—	—	—	
Now and Forever: The Ballads	Released: February 19, 2014; Label: Universal; Format: CD	—	—	—	—	—	—	
The Ultimate Collection	Released: April 29, 2016; Label: Universal Music Australia; Format: CD	—	17	—	—	—	—	
Stories to Tell: Greatest Hits and More	Released: July 2, 2021; Label: TourdForce, BMG; Format: CD, DD, streaming	—	—	—	—	—	—	
"—" denotes album that did not chart or was not released

Notes

- F Stories to Tell reached number 34 on Billboard Top Independent Albums Chart.

=== Promotional albums ===
Title	Album details
Marx	Released: 1991; Label: Capitol; Format: CD
Greatest Hits	Released: October 20, 1993; Label: CEMA Special Markets; Format: CD
His Songs, Your Life	Released: 1997; Label: Capitol; Format: CD
The Music of Richard Marx: 1987–2009	Released: 2009; Label: Chrysalis Music Group; Format: 2×CD

=== Live albums ===
Title	Album details
Ringo Starr & His All Starr Band Live 2006	Released: July 7, 2008; Label: Koch; Format: CD
Duo Live	Released: October 2010; Label: Zanzibar; Format: CD
A Night Out with Friends	Released: June 19, 2012; Label: Zanzibar; Format: CD

== Extended plays ==
Title	EP details
Channel V at the Hard Rock Live	Released: 1995; Label: Capitol; Formats: CD, digital download
Live Acoustic	Released: November 30, 2004; Label: Manhattan; Format: Digital download
The Christmas EP	Released: November 1, 2011; Label: Zanzibar Records/TourDForce; Formats: CD, digital download
The Vault Vol. 1	Released: November 22, 2021; Label: Richard Marx Inc; Formats: Vinyl
The Vault Vol. 2	Released: 2024; Label: TourDForce; Formats: Vinyl
After Hours: Live From The Grammy Museum	Released: October 16, 2026; Label: Richard Marx Inc; Format: digital

== Singles ==
Year	Title	Peak chart positions										Album
Year	Title	US	US AC/Rock^{[!]}	AUS	CAN	GER	IRE	NL	NZ	SWE	UK	Album
1987	"Don't Mean Nothing" ^{[G]}	3	1	—	8	—	—	—	—	—	78	Richard Marx
1987	"Should've Known Better" ^{[H]}	3	7	9	21	—	—	—	—	—	50	Richard Marx
1987	"Lonely Heart"	—	—	—	—	—	—	—	—	—	—	Richard Marx
1988	"Endless Summer Nights" ^{[H]}	2	2	16	4	—	—	62	42	13	50	Richard Marx
1988	"Hold On to the Nights"	1	3	70	6	—	—	—	—	—	60	Richard Marx
1988	"Have Mercy" ^{[G]}	—	17	—	—	—	—	—	—	—	—	Richard Marx
1989	"Satisfied" ^{[G]}	1	5	20	2	42	—	25	—	—	52	Repeat Offender
1989	"Right Here Waiting"	1	1	1	1	12	1	4	1	7	2	Repeat Offender
1989	"Angelia"	4	2	32	1	23	13	18	16	—	45	Repeat Offender
1989	"Nothin' You Can Do About It" ^{[G]}	—	12	—	—	—	—	—	—	—	—	Repeat Offender
1990	"Too Late to Say Goodbye" ^{[G]}	12	17	99	8	53	18	76	—	—	38	Repeat Offender
1990	"Children of the Night"	13	6	120	6	58	—	—	—	—	54	Repeat Offender
1991	"Hard to Believe" (with Kevin Cronin, Bill Champlin, and David Crosby)	—	—	—	—	—	—	—	—	—	—	Non-album single
1991	"Keep Coming Back"	12	1	34	3	52	—	40	32	37	55	Rush Street
1992	"Hazard"	9	1	1	3	42	2	60	7	6	3	Rush Street
1992	"Take This Heart"	20	4	11	4	—	21	—	48	—	13	Rush Street
1992	"Chains Around My Heart"	44	9	59	17	—	—	—	—	—	29	Rush Street
1992	"Can't Help Falling in Love"	—	—	—	—	—	—	—	—	—	—	Rush Street
1992	"Playing with Fire"	—	—	—	—	—	—	—	—	—	—	Rush Street
1994	"Now and Forever"	7	1	16	6	54	18	—	21	11	13	Paid Vacation
1994	"Silent Scream"	—	—	—	17	79	—	—	—	—	32	Paid Vacation
1994	"The Way She Loves Me"	20	3	—	7	—	—	—	—	—	38	Paid Vacation
1995	"Nothing Left Behind Us"	74	11	—	10	—	—	—	—	—	—	Paid Vacation
1995	"Haunt Me Tonight" (with Bruce Gaitsch)	—	—	—	—	—	—	—	—	—	—	A Lyre in a Windstorm
1996	"Chaque Jour De Ta Vie" (with Roch Voisine)	—	—	—	—	—	—	—	—	—	—	Kissing Rain/Flesh and Bone
1996	"Heart of My Own"	—	—	—	—	—	—	—	—	—	—	One Voice: The Songs of Chage & Aska
1997	"Until I Find You Again"	42	3	—	32	—	—	—	—	15	97	Flesh and Bone
1997	"Touch of Heaven"	—	—	—	—	—	—	—	—	—	—	Flesh and Bone
1997	"Every Day of Your Life" (duet with Ryo Aska)	—	—	—	—	—	—	—	—	—	—	Flesh and Bone
1997	"Surrender to Me" (duet with Lara Fabian)	—	—	—	—	—	—	—	—	—	—	Flesh and Bone
1997	"At the Beginning" (with Donna Lewis)^{[I]}	45	2	64	—	77	—	70	—	—	—	Anastasia (soundtrack)
1998	"Slipping Away"	—	—	—	—	—	—	—	—	—	—	Greatest Hits
1998	"Thanks to You"	—	—	—	—	—	—	—	—	—	—	Greatest Hits
1998	"Angel's Lullaby"	—	—	—	—	—	—	—	—	—	—	Greatest Hits
2000	"Days in Avalon"	—	25	—	—	—	—	—	—	—	—	Days in Avalon
2001	"Straight from My Heart"	—	—	—	—	—	—	—	—	—	—	Days in Avalon
2004	"When You're Gone" ^{[J]}	—	20	—	—	—	—	—	—	—	—	My Own Best Enemy
2005	"Nothing Left to Say"	—	—	—	—	—	—	—	—	—	—	My Own Best Enemy
2005	"Ready to Fly" ^{[K]}	—	22	—	—	—	—	—	—	—	—	My Own Best Enemy
2007	"From the Inside"	—	—	—	—	—	—	—	—	—	—	Emotional Remains
2010	"Everybody"	—	—	—	—	—	—	—	—	—	—	Stories to Tell
2011	"When You Loved Me"	—	16	—	—	—	—	—	—	—	—	Stories to Tell
2011	"When Love Is All You've Got" (with George Canyon)	—	—	—	—	—	—	—	—	—	—	Better Be Home Soon
2011	"Christmas Spirit"	—	15	—	—	—	—	—	—	—	—	The Christmas EP/Christmas Spirit
2012	"Wouldn't Let Me Love You"	—	—	—	—	—	—	—	—	—	—	Inside My Head
2012	"Santa Claus Is Coming to Town" (with Sara Niemietz)	—	—	—	—	—	—	—	—	—	—	Christmas Spirit
2012	"Little Drummer Boy"	—	7	—	—	—	—	—	—	—	—	Christmas Spirit
2012	"Christmas Mornings"	—	—	—	—	—	—	—	—	—	—	Christmas Spirit
2012	"O Holy Night"	—	19	—	—	—	—	—	—	—	—	Christmas Spirit
2013	"Just Go"	—	—	—	—	—	—	—	—	—	—	Beautiful Goodbye/Songwriter
2013	"All Through the Night" (with Heart)	—	16	—	45	—	—	—	—	—	—	Non-album single
2014	"Turn Off the Night"	—	—	—	—	—	—	—	—	—	—	Beautiful Goodbye
2014	"Whatever We Started"	—	29	—	—	—	—	—	—	—	—	Beautiful Goodbye
2014	"Beautiful Goodbye"	—	—	—	—	—	—	—	—	—	—	Beautiful Goodbye
2014	"All You Need Is Love" (with Dave Koz, Eric Benet, Johnny Mathis, Heather Headley, Jonathan Butler, Maysa, BeBe Winans, Gloria Estefan, and Stevie Wonder)^{[L]}	—	—	—	—	—	—	—	—	—	—	The 25th of December
2016	"Last Thing I Wanted"	—	—	—	—	—	—	—	—	—	—	The Ultimate Collection/Limitless
2016	"I Heard the Bells on Christmas Day"	—	—	—	—	—	—	—	—	—	—	Christmas Spirit
2018	"Dance with My Father"	—	—	—	—	—	—	—	—	—	—	Non-album single
2019	"Another One Down"	—	14	—	—	—	—	—	—	—	—	Limitless
2019	"Let Go"	—	—	—	—	—	—	—	—	—	—	Limitless
2019	"Happy New Year, Old Friend"	—	—	—	—	—	—	—	—	—	—	Christmas Spirit re-release
2020	"Front Row Seat"	—	—	—	—	—	—	—	—	—	—	Limitless
2020	"Limitless"	—	—	—	—	—	—	—	—	—	—	Limitless
2020	"Holiday"	—	—	—	—	—	—	—	—	—	—	Christmas Spirit re-release
2022	"Same Heartbreak, Different Day"	—	15	—	—	—	—	—	—	—	—	Songwriter
2022	"One Day Longer"	—	—	—	—	—	—	—	—	—	—	Songwriter
2022	"Shame on You"	—	—	—	—	—	—	—	—	—	—	Songwriter
2023	"Believe in Me"	—	—	—	—	—	—	—	—	—	—	Songwriter
2023	"Days to Remember"	—	—	—	—	—	—	—	—	—	—	Non-album singles
2025	"Oh What a Dream We Had" (with Il Divo, Lara Fabian, Noah Cyrus, Michal David, Billy Idol, Billy Ray Cyrus, Braison Cyrus, Kimbra, Lauri Ylönen, Marcelito, and Czech Philharmonic Orchestra)	—	—	—	—	—	—	—	—	—	—	Non-album singles
2025	"Forget About the World"	—	—	—	—	—	—	—	—	—	—	Non-album singles
2025	"Magic Hour"	—	—	—	—	—	—	—	—	—	—	After Hours
2025	"All I Ever Needed"	—	—	—	—	—	—	—	—	—	—	After Hours
2025	"Big Band Boogie" (with Kenny G)	—	—	—	—	—	—	—	—	—	—	After Hours
2025	"The Way You Look Tonight"	—	—	—	—	—	—	—	—	—	—	After Hours
2026	"Young at Heart" (with Rod Stewart)	—	—	—	—	—	—	—	—	—	—	After Hours
2026	"Driving and Listening to Music" (with Charles Kelley)	—	—	—	—	—	—	—	—	—	—	non-album single
2026	"Take Care of California" (with John Stamos)	—	—	—	—	—	—	—	—	—	—	New Cool People

Notes

- ! The chart positions in the second US column are from Billboard's Adult Contemporary Tracks Chart unless otherwise mentioned. The songs that did not chart on the A.C. Chart but did on Billboard's Mainstream Rock Tracks Chart or Adult Top 40 Tracks have the peak positions from those charts listed here.
- G The chart positions in the second US column for "Don't Mean Nothing", "Have Mercy", "Satisfied", "Nothing You Can Do About It" and "Too Late to Say Goodbye" are for Billboard's Mainstream Rock Tracks Chart as none of those songs charted on Billboard's Adult Contemporary Tracks Chart.
- H "Should've Known Better" and "Endless Summer Nights" charted on both Billboard's Mainstream Rock Tracks Chart and Adult Contemporary Tracks Chart. On Mainstream Rock Tracks, "Should've Known Better" peaked at No. 7 and "Endless Summer Nights" peaked at No. 41; on Adult Contemporary Tracks, "Should've Known Better" peaked at No. 20 and "Endless Summer Nights" peaked at No. 2.
- I "At the Beginning" charted on Billboard's Adult Contemporary Tracks chart at No. 2 and also charted on Radio & Records' Adult Contemporary Chart at No. 1.
- J The chart position in the second US column for "When You're Gone" is for Billboard's Adult Top 40 Tracks Chart as it did not chart on Billboard's Adult Contemporary Tracks Chart.
- K "Ready to Fly" charted on both Billboard's Adult Contemporary Tracks chart and Billboard's Adult Top 40 Tracks Chart. On Adult Contemporary Tracks it peaked at No. 22 and on Adult Top 40 Tracks it peaked at No. 29.
- L "All You Need Is Love" charted on Billboard's Smooth Jazz Songs chart at No. 4.

== Music videos ==
Year	Song	Director
1987	"Don't Mean Nothing"	Dominic Sena
1987	"Should've Known Better"	Dominic Sena
1988	"Endless Summer Nights"	Greg Gold
1988	"Hold On to the Nights"	Dominic Sena
1989	"Satisfied"	Dominic Sena
1989	"Right Here Waiting"	Jim Yukich
1989	"Angelia"	Michael Bay
1990	"Too Late to Say Goodbye"	Jim Yukich
1990	"Children of the Night"	Greg Gold
1991	"Keep Coming Back"	Peter Care
1992	"Hazard"	Michael Haussman
1992	"Take This Heart"	Jim Yukich
1992	"Chains Around My Heart"	Peter Nydrle
1994	"Now and Forever"	Mark Lindquist
1994	"Silent Scream"	Kiefer Sutherland
1994	"The Way She Loves Me"	Jim Yukich
1995	"Beautiful"	
1997	"Until I Find You Again"	Karen Bellone
1997	"Every Day of Your Life"	
1998	"Slipping Away"	Bill Ward
1998	"Thanks to You"	Bill Ward
1998	"Angel's Lullaby"	Bill Ward
1998	"At the Beginning"	
2004	"When You're Gone"	Brent Hedgecock
2005	"Ready to Fly"	Brent Hedgecock
2011	"When Love Is All You've Got"	
2012	"Wouldn't Let Me Love You"	
2012	"Santa Claus Is Coming to Town"	
2012	"Little Drummer Boy"	
2012	"Christmas Mornings"	
2012	"Christmas Spirit"	Richard Marx
2014	"Whatever We Started"	Deborah Anderson
2014	"Beautiful Goodbye"	Scott Brasher
2019	"Another One Down"	Nick Spanos
2020	"Front Row Seat"	Nick Spanos
2022	"Shame on You"	Aiyana Lapeyrolerie
2024	"Days to Remember"	
2025	"Oh What A Dream We Had"	Klara Davidova
2025	"Magic Hour"	Jamieson Mundy
2026	"Driving and Listening To Music"	
2026	Take Care of California	John Stamos

=== Official YouTube lyric videos ===
Year	Song
2011	"When You Loved Me"
2011	"Christmas Spirit"
2012	"Wouldn't Let Me Love You"
2013	"Just Go"
2022	"Same Heartbreak, Different Day"
2022	"One Day Longer"
2022	"Shame on You"
2024	"Days to Remember"
2025	"Magic Hour"

== Singles composed for other artists ==
Year	Single	Peak chart positions										artist
Year	Single	Billboard Hot 100	US[!]	CND	AUS	IRE	FRA	NZ	ITA	UK	JPN	artist
1984	"What About Me"	15	1	1	49	—	—	—	—	—	—	Kenny Rogers, Kim Carnes, & James Ingram
1985	"Crazy"	79	1	1	56	—	—	—	—	—	—	Kenny Rogers
1985	"If I Turn You Away"	—	—	—	—	—	—	—	—	—	—	Vicki Moss
1986	"Somebody Took My Love"	—	—	—	—	—	—	—	—	—	—	Durell Coleman
1986	"The Best of Me"	80	6	3	—	—	—	—	—	—	—	David Foster & Olivia Newton-John
1989	"Edge of a Broken Heart"	26	24	—	—	—	—	—	—	—	—	Vixen
1989	"Nothin' to Hide"	39	—	8	—	—	—	—	—	—	—	Poco
1989	"Surrender to Me"	6	—	—	—	—	—	—	—	—	—	Ann Wilson & Robin Zander
1989	"Swear Your Love"	—	—	—	—	—	—	—	—	—	—	Steve Lukather
1989	"The Best of Me"	—	—	—	63	2	—	25	—	2	—	Cliff Richard
1993	"The Reason Why"	—	—	—	—	—	—	—	—	—	—	John Farnham
1995	"Every Year, Every Christmas"	—	32	—	—	—	—	—	—	43	—	Luther Vandross
1997	"Without You"	—	—	—	—	—	—	—	—	—	—	Samantha Cole
1999	"If You Ever Leave Me"	—	62	29	—	—	—	—	—	26	—	Barbra Streisand & Vince Gill
1999	"One More Time"	—	—	—	—	—	—	—	42	—	—	Laura Pausini
1999	"Right Here Waiting"	—	—	—	—	—	—	—	—	—	—	Monica
1999	"The Last Words You Said"	—	—	—	—	—	—	—	—	—	—	Sarah Brightman
2000	"Angel on My Shoulder"	—	14	—	—	—	—	—	—	—	—	Natalie Cole
2000	"This I Promise You"	5	1	8	42	—	—	32	—	21	—	N Sync
2001	"Still Holding Out for You"	—	—	—	—	—	—	—	—	—	—	SheDaisy
2001	"To Where You Are"	—	1	—	—	—	—	—	—	—	—	Josh Groban
2003	"Dance with My Father"	38	1	—	—	—	—	—	—	21	—	Luther Vandross
2003	"Life Got in the Way"	—	36	—	—	—	—	—	—	—	—	Sister Hazel
2003	"Someday"	—	31	—	—	—	—	—	—	—	—	Vince Gill
2003	"With This Ring"	—	22	—	—	—	—	—	—	—	—	Kenny Loggins
2004	"I Miss Us"	—	18	—	—	—	—	—	—	—	—	Kenny Loggins
2004	"Last One Standing"	89	21	25	—	—	—	—	—	—	—	Emerson Drive
2004	"Without You"	—	—	—	—	—	—	—	—	—	1	Kimberley Locke
2004	"World Inside My Head"	—	—	—	—	—	—	—	—	—	—	Sister Hazel
2005	"Better Life"	44	1	—	—	—	—	—	—	—	—	Keith Urban
2005	"If You Were My Girl"	—	—	7	—	—	—	—	—	—	—	Emerson Drive
2006	"Suddenly"	—	—	—	—	—	8	—	—	—	—	Toni Braxton
2007	"Everybody"	64	5	71	—	—	—	—	—	—	—	Keith Urban
2007	"You Never Take Me Dancing"	—	27	—	—	—	—	—	—	—	—	Travis Tritt
2008	"Just Like You"	—	—	4	—	—	—	—	—	—	—	George Canyon
2008	"One Little Miracle"	—	24	—	—	—	—	—	—	—	—	Hawk Nelson
2009	"All Over Me"	—	—	2	—	—	—	—	—	—	—	Default
2009	"All or Nothing"	—	—	99	—	—	—	—	—	—	—	George Canyon
2009	"In Your Arms Again"	—	—	16	—	—	—	—	—	—	—	George Canyon & Crystal Shawanda
2009	"Nobody Says No"	—	—	27	—	—	—	—	—	—	—	Jessie Farrell
2010	"Fear of Falling"	—	—	—	—	—	—	—	—	—	—	Katherine Jenkins
2010	"Long Hot Summer"	45	1	35	82	—	—	—	—	—	—	Keith Urban
2011	"Surrender"	—	—	5	—	—	—	—	—	—	—	George Canyon
2011	"Dance with My Father"	—	—	—	—	—	—	—	—	—	—	Joe McElderry
2016	"Take Me Down"	—	60	—	—	—	—	—	—	—	—	Vince Gill
2020	"Faker"	—	—	—	—	—	—	—	—	—	—	Fee Waybill
2026	"Anywhere You Want To Go"	—	—	—	—	—	—	—	—	—	—	Justin Fabus

Notes

- ! This column covers all other American charts such as Adult Contemporary, Country, Rock Mainstream, R&B, Christian, Adult Pop, all Airplays
