= The Ultimate Collection (Richard Marx album) =

Compilation album by Richard Marx
- Released: April 29, 2016
- Recorded: 1986–2015
- Genres: Pop rock; adult contemporary
- Length: 74:15
- Label: Universal Music Australia
- Producer: Richard Marx

Richard Marx chronology
Beautiful Goodbye (2014)	The Ultimate Collection (2016)	Repeat Offender Revisited (2019)

Singles from Richard Marx
- 1. "Last Thing I Wanted" Released: May 13, 2016

The Ultimate Collection is a compilation album by singer-songwriter and producer Richard Marx, released exclusively in Australia by Universal Music Australia on April 29, 2016. The album covers Marx's hit singles and the new track "Last Thing I Wanted". The Ultimate Collection peaked at Number 17 on the ARIA Charts.

== Track listing ==
All tracks are written by Richard Marx, except where noted.

No.	Title	Writer(s)	Original release	Length
1.	"Right Here Waiting"		Repeat Offender, 1989	4:26
2.	"Hazard"		Rush Street, 1991	5:17
3.	"Should've Known Better"		Richard Marx, 1987	4:10
4.	"Endless Summer Nights"		Richard Marx	4:31
5.	"Now and Forever"		Paid Vacation, 1994	3:34
6.	"Take This Heart"		Rush Street	4:10
7.	"Satisfied"		Repeat Offender	4:13
8.	"Hold On to the Nights"		Richard Marx	5:11
9.	"Angelia"		Repeat Offender	5:18
10.	"Until I Find You Again"		Flesh and Bone, 1997	4:24
11.	"Keep Coming Back"		Rush Street	6:49
12.	"The Way She Loves Me"		Paid Vacation	4:16
13.	"Don't Mean Nothing"	Marx; Bruce Gaitsch	Richard Marx	4:41
14.	"Children of the Night"		Repeat Offender	4:43
15.	"Heaven Only Knows"		Richard Marx	5:40
16.	"Last Thing I Wanted"	Marx; Ashley Gorley; Ross Copperman	New recording	2:51
Total length:				74:15

== Charts ==
Chart (2016)	Peak position
Australian Albums (ARIA)	17
