= The Best of Richard Marx =

Greatest hits album by Richard Marx
- Released: October 2, 2000
- Recorded: 1986–1994
- Genres: Pop rock; adult contemporary
- Length: 47:44
- Label: EMI
- Producers: Richard Marx; David Cole; Humberto Gatica

Richard Marx chronology
Greatest Hits (1997)	The Best of Richard Marx (2000)	The Essential Richard Marx (2000)

Professional ratings
Review scores
Source	Rating
Allmusic	2.5/5 stars

The Best of Richard Marx is the fourth compilation album by singer-songwriter and producer Richard Marx, released by EMI in 2000. It contains a selection of Marx's singles from 1987 to 1994.

== Track listing ==
All tracks are written by Richard Marx.

No.	Title	Original release	Length
1.	"Angelia"	Repeat Offender, 1989	5:18
2.	"Hazard"	Rush Street, 1991	5:17
3.	"Right Here Waiting"	Repeat Offender	4:23
4.	"Hold On to the Nights"	Richard Marx, 1987	5:14
5.	"Satisfied"	Repeat Offender	4:14
6.	"Keep Coming Back"	Rush Street	6:49
7.	"Endless Summer Nights"	Richard Marx	4:32
8.	"Now and Forever"	Paid Vacation, 1994	3:34
9.	"Should've Known Better"	Richard Marx	4:12
10.	"Take This Heart"	Rush Street	4:11
Total length:			47:44
