= Greatest Hits (1997 Richard Marx album) =

1997 compilation album by Richard Marx

Greatest hits album by Richard Marx
- Released: November 1997; April 1998 (VCD version)
- Recorded: 1986–1997
- Genres: Rock; R&B; adult contemporary
- Length: 74:41
- Label: Capitol
- Producers: Richard Marx; David Cole; Humberto Gatica; Randy Jackson

Richard Marx chronology
Flesh and Bone (1997)	Greatest Hits (1997)	The Best of Richard Marx (2000)

Professional ratings
Review scores
Source	Rating
AllMusic	4.5/5 stars

Greatest Hits is a greatest hits album by American singer-songwriter and producer Richard Marx. Released in 1997, this hits package was Marx's final release under his ten-year-long Capitol Records recording contract. It contains fourteen of his single releases, plus "Touch of Heaven", a promotional single from the 1997 album Flesh & Bone, and "Angel's Lullaby", a track that had appeared on the 1996 compilation album For Our Children, Too, released to benefit the Pediatric AIDS Foundation.

Greatest Hits was certified Gold in the United Kingdom in 2024 for sales of 100,000 copies. In 2016, the album was certified Gold by the RIAA — which represents U.S. sales of over 500,000 copies — becoming Marx's fifth American Gold album.

The album was dedicated to Dick Marx, Richard Marx's father.

== Track listing ==
All tracks are written by Richard Marx, except "Don't Mean Nothing", written by Richard Marx and Bruce Gaitsch.

Standard edition
No.	Title	Original release	Length
1.	"Don't Mean Nothing"	Richard Marx, 1987	4:42
2.	"Endless Summer Nights"	Richard Marx	4:32
3.	"Now and Forever"	Paid Vacation, 1994	3:34
4.	"Should've Known Better"	Richard Marx	4:12
5.	"Angelia"	Repeat Offender, 1989	5:18
6.	"Hold On to the Nights"	Richard Marx	5:14
7.	"Angel's Lullaby"	For Our Children, Too, 1996	3:58
8.	"Take This Heart"	Rush Street, 1991	4:11
9.	"Satisfied"	Repeat Offender	4:14
10.	"Until I Find You Again"	Flesh and Bone, 1997	4:25
11.	"Hazard"	Rush Street	5:17
12.	"The Way She Loves Me"	Paid Vacation	4:15
13.	"Keep Coming Back"	Rush Street	6:49
14.	"Children of the Night"	Repeat Offender	4:42
15.	"Touch of Heaven"	Flesh and Bone	4:52
16.	"Right Here Waiting"	Repeat Offender	4:23
Total length:			74:41

1999 Japanese/South Korean edition
No.	Title	Original release	Length
1.	"Slipping Away"	New recording	4:13
2.	"Thanks to You"	New recording	4:28
3.	"Now and Forever"	Paid Vacation	3:32
4.	"Endless Summer Nights"	Richard Marx	4:31
5.	"Don't Mean Nothing"	Richard Marx	4:41
6.	"Angel's Lullaby"	For Our Children, Too	3:57
7.	"Children of the Night"	Repeat Offender	4:43
8.	"Should've Known Better"	Richard Marx	4:10
9.	"Until I Find You Again"	Flesh and Bone	4:24
10.	"Hazard"	Rush Street	5:15
11.	"The Way She Loves Me"	Paid Vacation	4:15
12.	"Keep Coming Back"	Rush Street	6:49
13.	"Angelia"	Repeat Offender	5:17
14.	"Hold On to the Nights"	Richard Marx	5:13
15.	"Take This Heart"	Rush Street	4:09
16.	"Right Here Waiting"	Repeat Offender	4:23
Total length:			74:00

== Charts ==
Chart (1997–98)	Peak position
New Zealand Albums Chart	18
Norwegian Albums Chart	2
Scottish Albums (Official Charts)	48
Swedish Albums Chart	13
UK Albums Chart	34
US Billboard 200	140

== Certifications ==
Region	Certification	Certified units/sales
United Kingdom (BPI)	Gold	100,000^{‡}
United States (RIAA)	Gold	500,000^{‡}
^{‡} Sales+streaming figures based on certification alone.
