= Ballads (Richard Marx album) =

Compilation album by Richard Marx
- Released: March 3, 1994
- Recorded: 1987–1994
- Genre: Pop
- Length: 59:03 (Japan); 61:36 (Asia-Pacific/South Africa)
- Label: Capitol
- Producers: Richard Marx; David Cole

Richard Marx chronology
Paid Vacation (1994)	Ballads (1994)	Channel V At The Hard Rock Live (1997)

Professional ratings
Review scores
Source	Rating
AllMusic	2.5/5 stars

Ballads (also known as Ballads (Then, Now and Forever)) is the second compilation album by Richard Marx, initially released in Japan by Capitol Records on March 3, 1994. This disc features ten of Marx's ballads including one live and one previously released non-single track. The Asia-Pacific and South African release of the album features the bonus tracks "(It Looks Like) I'll Never Fall in Love" and "Can't Help Falling in Love".

== Track listing ==
All tracks are written by Richard Marx, except where noted.

Japanese release
No.	Title	Writer(s)	Original release	Length
1.	"Now and Forever"		Paid Vacation, 1994	3:32
2.	"Keep Coming Back"		Rush Street, 1991	5:26
3.	"Hold On to the Nights"		Richard Marx, 1987	5:07
4.	"Silent Scream"		Paid Vacation	3:52
5.	"Angelia"		Repeat Offender, 1989	5:17
6.	"Right Here Waiting"		Repeat Offender	4:24
7.	"Hazard"		Rush Street	5:17
8.	"Children of the Night"		Repeat Offender	4:44
9.	"Endless Summer Nights"		Richard Marx	4:27
10.	"Now and Forever" (live)		Previously unreleased	3:45
11.	"Chains Around My Heart"	Marx; Fee Waybill	Rush Street	5:42
12.	"Heaven Only Knows"		Richard Marx	5:35
Total length:				53:51

Asia-Pacific/South African bonus tracks
No.	Title	Writer(s)	Original release	Length
13.	"(It Looks Like) I'll Never Fall in Love Again"	Traditional; Jimmie Currie; Lonnie Donegan	Previously unreleased	3:53
14.	"Can't Help Falling in Love"	Hugo Peretti; Luigi Creatore; George David Weiss	Previously unreleased	3:40
Total length:				61:36

== Certifications ==
Region	Certification	Certified units/sales
Hong Kong (IFPI Hong Kong)	Gold	10,000^{*}
India	Gold	10,000
Japan (RIAJ)	Gold	100,000^{^}
Indonesia	Gold	25,000
Malaysia	2× Platinum	50,000
Philippines (PARI)	Gold	20,000^{*}
Singapore (RIAS)	Platinum	15,000^{*}
South Korea (KMCA)	Platinum	30,000
Taiwan (RIT)	4× Platinum	200,000
Thailand	2× Platinum	80,000
^{*} Sales figures based on certification alone.^{^} Shipments figures based on certification alone.
