= The Essential Richard Marx =

Compilation album by Richard Marx
- Released: October 2000
- Recorded: 1986–1991
- Genres: Pop rock; adult contemporary
- Label: EMI Gold
- Producer: Richard Marx

Richard Marx chronology
| The Best of Richard Marx (2000) | The Essential Richard Marx (2000) | Days in Avalon (2000) |

The Essential Richard Marx is a compilation album by singer-songwriter and producer Richard Marx, released in 2000. It includes songs from his first three albums, most of which were hit singles.

== Track listing ==
All tracks are written by Richard Marx, except where noted.

| No. | Title | Writer(s) | Original release | Length |
|---|---|---|---|---|
| 1. | "Should've Known Better" | | Richard Marx, 1987 | 4:12 |
| 2. | "Don't Mean Nothing" | Marx; Bruce Gaitsch | Richard Marx | 4:42 |
| 3. | "Too Late to Say Goodbye" | Marx; Fee Waybill | Repeat Offender, 1989 | 4:57 |
| 4. | "Hazard" | | Rush Street, 1991 | 5:17 |
| 5. | "Lonely Heart" | Marx; Waybill | Richard Marx | 3:53 |
| 6. | "Remember Manhattan" | Marx; Waybill | Richard Marx | 4:18 |
| 7. | "Heaven Only Knows" | | Richard Marx | 5:40 |
| 8. | "Right Here Waiting" | | Repeat Offender | 4:23 |
| 9. | "Children of the Night" | | Repeat Offender | 4:42 |
| 10. | "That Was Lulu" | Marx; Dean Pitchford | Repeat Offender | 3:44 |
| 11. | "Nothin' You Can Do About It" | | Repeat Offender | 4:42 |
| 12. | "Endless Summer Nights" | | Richard Marx | 4:32 |
