= Michael Thompson (guitarist) =

American guitarist and songwriter (born 1954)

- Born: Michael Wood Thompson; February 11, 1954 (age 72); Port Washington, New York, U.S.
- Genres: Rock, alternative rock, pop, blues
- Occupations: Musician, songwriter
- Instrument: Guitar
- Years active: 1975–present
- Labels: Geffen, Frontiers

Michael Wood Thompson (born February 11, 1954 in Port Washington, New York) is an American guitarist and songwriter.

Thompson is known for his work as a session guitarist during the last 4 decades. He founded the rock group TRW in 2007.

== Early years ==
Michael Thompson grew up in Port Washington, New York and attended Berklee College of Music for two years, studying with Pat Metheny before leaving to tour and record with a local R&B/funk group called The Ellis Hall Group. After four years with the group, Thompson moved to Los Angeles in the hopes of starting a career as a studio musician, almost immediately getting a touring gig with Joe Cocker. Money was tight and to support himself and his wife Gloria, Thompson supplemented gigs playing on songwriters' publishing demos and sporadic session work with a job as a cab driver until landing a year-long world tour with Cher.

Following the tour, Thompson played guitar for the TV series Fame, a gig he would hold for four years, and started his own band, Slang. In 1983, he was invited by Andy Fraser, formerly of Free, to be the guitarist on his album Fine Fine Line, for Island Records (1984).

== The Michael Thompson Band ==
In 1988, Thompson finally landed a record deal for an album of his own, with Geffen Records. The eponymous Michael Thompson Band (also known by its initial logo, MTB), featuring lead vocals by Moon Calhoun, released the album How Long in 1989 and had a Billboard chart hit that year with the single "Can't Miss". The single hit #33 on the Hot Mainstream Rock Tracks chart. Other musicians on the album included Toto singer Bobby Kimball and ex-Kansas singer John Elefante on background vocals and John Keane, Terry Bozzio (Frank Zappa and Missing Persons) and Pat Torpey (Mr. Big) on drums.

== Later work ==
Thompson played on the eponymous debut album by the commercial fusion act Animal Logic, the brainchild of Police drummer Stewart Copeland and bassist Stanley Clarke. Thompson shared guitar duties with Peter Haycock (Climax Blues Band) and Steve Howe (Yes, Asia, GTR). Clarke and Copeland both went on to successful careers composing film scores for which they continued to tap Thompson for guitar work, and he has also worked on film scores by Hans Zimmer, James Newton Howard and Randy Edelman.

Just as Thompson's session career was hitting its stride, 1980s studio guitar staple Dann Huff left L.A. for Nashville and put out the word that producers and contractors who wanted him should instead call Michael Thompson. Thanks to the studio engineer Humberto Gatica's suggestion, Thompson began what would become a decade-long hit-laden association with producer/songwriter David Foster, including a number of Celine Dion records, beginning with "The Power of Love". It was during another Dion session for Foster in 1995 that R&B singer/songwriter/producer Babyface heard him through the wall of the studio and invited him to play on the project he was there for, the #1 Waiting to Exhale: Original Soundtrack Album for Whitney Houston. Babyface, too, would frequently use Thompson throughout the 1990s, including on the huge hit "Change the World" with Eric Clapton and Babyface's own hit single, "Every Time I Close My Eyes". Thompson was in Babyface's live band for the MTV special, album and DVD Babyface: MTV Unplugged NYC 1997.

Quincy Jones invited Thompson to be a guest on his 1995 album Q's Jook Joint. The following year Thompson released his first solo album, The World According to M.T. The album featured compositions by Thompson; a collaboration with Jeff Paris, who had guested on How Long; and a song written by another How Long collaborator, Mark Spiro. A cover of a Sam Cooke song, "A Change is Gonna Come", featuring Bobby Womack on vocals, peaked at #2 on the Billboard Bubbling Under R&B/Hip-Hop Singles.

Thompson's abilities and sensibilities are so trusted that BT magazine noted in its 2001 "Platinum Touch" cover story on Thompson that "These days, many artists and producers just drop their tapes off at Thompson's home studio and let him add whatever he wants. It is a convenient, low-pressure way to work, but Thompson says he still loves to interact with other musicians at the big studios."

In 2001 Thompson was awarded the "Distinguished Alumni" award from his alma mater Berklee College of Music to commemorate his contributions to the music industry. Berklee's program for the event noted that "he is widely regarded as being among the elite studio session players, and his list of credits includes such prominent names as Michael Jackson, Whitney Houston, Celine Dion, 'N Sync, Toni Braxton, Phil Collins, Rod Stewart, Joe Sample, the Scorpions, Vince Neil, Christina Aguilera, Michael Bolton, Thalía, Mariah Carey, Bette Midler, Madonna, BabyFace, En Vogue, Gloria Estefan, Stanley Clarke, and Ricky Martin."

Robert John "Mutt" Lange worked with Thompson on Shania Twain's album Up! (2003). Here Mutt and Twain flew down to Milano to collaborate, as Thompson was working on recording with an Italian artist at the time. According to Thompson he first played on 7 tracks in Italy, and later Mutt asked him to come to Hawaii to play on most of the remaining tracks as well.

In 2007, Thompson revisited his late-1980s melodic rock heyday with two projects. He recorded three new songs for a remastered re-release of Michael Thompson Band's How Long, released in the summer of that year. He also formed a new band, TRW, with Mark Williamson on vocals and bass and John Robinson on drums. The group released the album Rivers of Paradise (2007).

== Discography ==
Solo

- The World According to M.T. (1998)
- M.T. Speaks (2005)

Michael Thompson Band

- How Long (1989)
- How Long (2007, Remastered with 3 Bonus Tracks)
- Future Past (2012)
- Love & Beyond (2019)
- High Times - Live In Italy (2020, Live CD/DVD)
- The Love Goes On (2023)

TRW (Thompson, Robinson, Williamson)

- Rivers of Paradise (2007)

=== As sideman ===
- Cher (1987) Cher
- Till I Loved You (1988) Barbra Streisand
- Not Me (1988) Glenn Medeiros
- Heart of Stone (1989) Cher
- Good to Be Back (1989) Natalie Cole
- Bowling in Paris (1989) Stephen Bishop
- Somebody Loves You (1989) Paul Anka
- The Simpsons Sing the Blues (1990) The Simpsons
- Kiss Me with the Wind (1990) Brenda Russell
- For My Broken Heart (1991) Reba McEntire
- Love Hurts (1991) Cher
- Lovescape (1991) Neil Diamond
- Time, Love & Tenderness (1991) Michael Bolton
- Celine Dion (1992) Céline Dion
- Jennifer Rush (1992) Jennifer Rush
- Timeless: The Classics (1992) Michael Bolton
- Breathless (1992) Kenny G
- Start the Car (1992) Jude Cole
- The Colour of My Love (1993) Céline Dion
- Back to Broadway (1993) Barbra Streisand
- The One Thing (1993) Michael Bolton
- Soul Talkin' (1993) Brenda Russell
- Have a Little Faith (1994) Joe Cocker
- Window (1994) Christopher Cross
- Rhythm of Love (1994) Anita Baker
- The Christmas Album, Volume II (1994) Neil Diamond
- Groove On (1994) Gerald LeVert
- Through the Fire (1994) Peabo Bryson
- Invisible (1994) La Ley
- Something To Remember (1995) Madonna
- Waiting to Exhale (1995) Various
- A Very Fine Love (1995) Dusty Springfield
- HIStory: Past, Present and Future, Book I (1995) Michael Jackson
- Out of My Hands (1995) Jennifer Rush
- It's a Mystery (1995) Bob Seger
- Falling Into You (1996) Céline Dion
- Sweet 19 Blues (1996) Namie Amuro
- For You I Will (1996) Monica
- Secrets (1996) Toni Braxton
- Every Time I Close My Eyes (1996) Babyface
- Blood on the Dance Floor: HIStory in the Mix (1997) Michael Jackson
- Flame (1997) Patti LaBelle
- Cowgirl Dreamin (1997) Yumi Matsutoya
- Concentration 20 (1997) Namie Amuro
- Butterfly (1997) Mariah Carey
- Open Road (1997) Gary Barlow
- Let's Talk About Love (1997) Céline Dion
- Deborah (1997) Debbie Gibson
- Flesh and Bone (1997) Richard Marx
- Freedom (1997) Sheena Easton
- Eden (1998) Sarah Brightman
- Greg Bissonette (1998) Greg Bissonette
- ...Hits (1998) Phil Collins
- Bathhouse Betty (1998) Bette Midler
- A Body of Work (1998) Paul Anka
- Back with a Heart (1998) Olivia Newton-John
- Jennifer Paige (1998) Jennifer Paige
- Keep the Faith (1998) Faith Evans
- These Are Special Times (1998) Céline Dion
- Io non so parlar d'amore (1999) Adriano Celentano
- Affirmation (1999) Savage Garden
- Christina Aguilera (1999) Christina Aguilera
- Timeless: The Classics Vol. 2 (1999) Michael Bolton
- Piece of Paradise (1999) Sky
- Short Stories (2000) Miyuki Nakajima
- Days in Avalon (2000) Richard Marx
- Friends for Schuur (2000) Diane Schuur
- You, Too Cool (2001) Eikichi Yazawa
- Christmas Memories (2001) Barbra Streisand
- Invincible (2001) Michael Jackson
- Enchantment (2001) Charlotte Church
- Snowflakes (2001) Toni Braxton
- Josh Groban (2001) Josh Groban
- Up! (2002) Shania Twain
- Only a Woman Like You (2002) Michael Bolton
- Twisted Angel (2002) LeAnn Rimes
- Cry (2002) Faith Hill
- A New Day Has Come (2002) Céline Dion
- Couldn't Have Said It Better (2003) Meat Loaf
- Michael Bublé (2003) Michael Bublé
- Closer (2003) Josh Groban
- Genius Loves Company (2004) Ray Charles
- What a Wonderful World (2004) LeAnn Rimes
- Motown Two (2004) Michael McDonald
- My Own Best Enemy (2004) Richard Marx
- It's Time (2005) Michael Bublé
- Classic Moments (2005) Patti LaBelle
- A Little Soul in Your Heart (2005) Lulu
- Lullaby Singer (2006) Miyuki Nakajima
- Givin' It Up (2006) George Benson, Al Jarreau
- Awake (2006) Josh Groban
- Taking Chances (2007) Céline Dion
- East of Angel Town (2007) Peter Cincotti
- Family (2007) LeAnn Rimes
- Seal (2008) Seal
- Emotional Remains (2008) Richard Marx
- Soul Speak (2008) Michael McDonald
- Christmas (2008) Al Jarreau
- Sundown (2008) Richard Marx
- Crazy Love (2009) Michael Bublé
- One World One Love (2009) Michael Bolton
- Primera Fila (2009) Thalía
- After Hours (2012) Glenn Frey
- Loved Me Back to Life (2013) Céline Dion
- A Volte Esagero (2014) Gianluca Grignani
- Man on the Rocks (2014) Mike Oldfield
- Tracks of My Years (2014) Bryan Adams
- Beautiful Goodbye (2014) Richard Marx
- Wallflower (2015) Diana Krall
- Electropop (2016) Miguel Mateos
- Encore un soir (2016) Céline Dion
- Love (2018) Michael Bublé

=== Film and TV scores ===
- Fame (1982–1987)
- Miami Vice (1989–1990)
- Tiny Toon Adventures (1990-1991)
- Days of Thunder (1990) Hans Zimmer (Additional only)
- Melrose Place (1992-1999)
- California Dreams (1992-1994)
- Animaniacs (1993-1998)
- Cool Runnings (1993) Hans Zimmer
- What's Love Got to Do with It (1993) Stanley Clarke
- I'll Do Anything (1994) Hans Zimmer
- Renaissance Man (1994) Hans Zimmer
- Heat (1995) Elliot Goldenthal
- The Rock (1996) Hans Zimmer
- The Preacher's Wife (1996) Hans Zimmer
- Space Jam (1996) James Newton Howard
- Primal Fear (1996) James Newton Howard
- Daylight (1996) Randy Edelman
- Home Alone 3 (1997) Nick Glennie-Smith
- G.I. Jane (1997) Trevor Jones
- Chill Factor (1999) Hans Zimmer
- Romeo Must Die (2000) Stanley Clarke
- Gideon's Crossing (2000) James Newton Howard
- Big Trouble (2002) James Newton Howard
- Hairspray (2007) Marc Shaiman
