= Sky (Canadian band) =

Canadian pop-rock duo

- Origin: Montreal, Canada
- Genres: Pop rock; blue-eyed soul; R&B
- Years active: 1997–2005
- Labels: Phat Royale; EMI Music Canada; Sextant
- Past members: James Renald; Antoine Sicotte; Anastasia Friedman; Karl Wolf

Sky was a Canadian R&B-influenced pop rock duo from Montreal, Quebec. It originally consisted of James Renald (1971–2018) and Antoine Sicotte, son of actor Gilbert Sicotte. Both were songwriters, producers, and multi-instrumentalists who met in 1992 at a music engineering school in Montreal. Anastasia Friedman replaced Renald as lead singer after he left, and Karl Wolf was the group's last vocalist.

== History ==
=== First iteration ===
Formed in 1997, Sky created their own record label, Phat Royale, to release their first EP, America, which was completely self-produced and included five songs. In Quebec, 43 radio stations began playing their music, leading to a record deal with EMI Music Canada in 1998.

Sky published their first studio album, Piece of Paradise, in 1999. It was produced by Peter Mokran at Metalworks Studios and Euro-Syndicate Productions at Gallery Studios in New York. The album was preceded by the singles "America" and "Some Kinda Wonderful" and included contributions from such musicians as Wah-Wah Watson, Michael Thompson, and Neil Stubenhaus. Three more singles were issued from the album: "Love Song", "Push", and "All I Want".

In February, Sky signed a new record deal with Arista for the US, UK, and Japan. The album was re-released later that year, with two tracks being replaced. Sky also opened for Britney Spears on the Canadian leg of her ...Baby One More Time Tour, in July. In 2000, Renald announced his departure from the band, and he did not attend that year's Juno Awards, where Sky won the Best New Group award.

=== Second iteration ===
Renald was replaced by Anastasia Friedman, and together with Sicotte as the new version of Sky, they released their first single, "Superhero", in August 2000. It was followed in November by the studio album Travelling Infinity. The second single from the record was "You".

=== Third iteration ===
In 2003, the third and last incarnation of Sky came about, with Friedman being replaced by Karl Wolf. Under Sextant Records, the group released a third album, Picture Perfect, which spawned the singles "Dedication" and "Crazy". The band split up in 2005.

== After Sky ==
After leaving Sky, James Renald continued his songwriting and production career in Los Angeles, where he resided until 2017. He notably wrote and produced the 2001 Mandy Moore single "Cry". On 11 August 2018, at the age of 47, Renald died by suicide in Eastman, Quebec.

Antoine Sicotte became a celebrity chef, author of cookbooks, as well as host of the television cooking show Le Cuisinier rebelle, based on his 2009 cookbook of the same name.

Karl Wolf went on to launch a solo career, and as of 2026, he has released ten studio albums.

== Discography ==
=== Studio albums ===
Year	Album	Chart positions	Certifications
Year	Album	CAN	Certifications
1999	Piece of Paradise	6	MC: Platinum
2000	Travelling Infinity	—	
2003	Picture Perfect	—	

=== Singles ===
Year	Single	Chart positions			Album
Year	Single	CAN	CAN AC	US Pop	Album
1997	"America"	—	—	—	Piece of Paradise
1998	"Some Kinda Wonderful"	4	16	—	Piece of Paradise
1999	"Love Song"	1	1	38	Piece of Paradise
1999	"Push"	11	11	—	Piece of Paradise
1999	"All I Want"	31	4	—	Piece of Paradise
2000	"Superhero"	—	*	—	Travelling Infinity
2001	"You"	1	*	—	Travelling Infinity
2003	"Dedication"	—	*	—	Picture Perfect
2003	"Crazy"	—	*	—	Picture Perfect
"—" denotes releases that did not chart * denotes unknown peak positions

== Awards and recognition ==
- 2000: winner, Juno Award for New Group of the Year
