= Hazard, Nebraska =

Village in Sherman County, Nebraska, United States

- Village
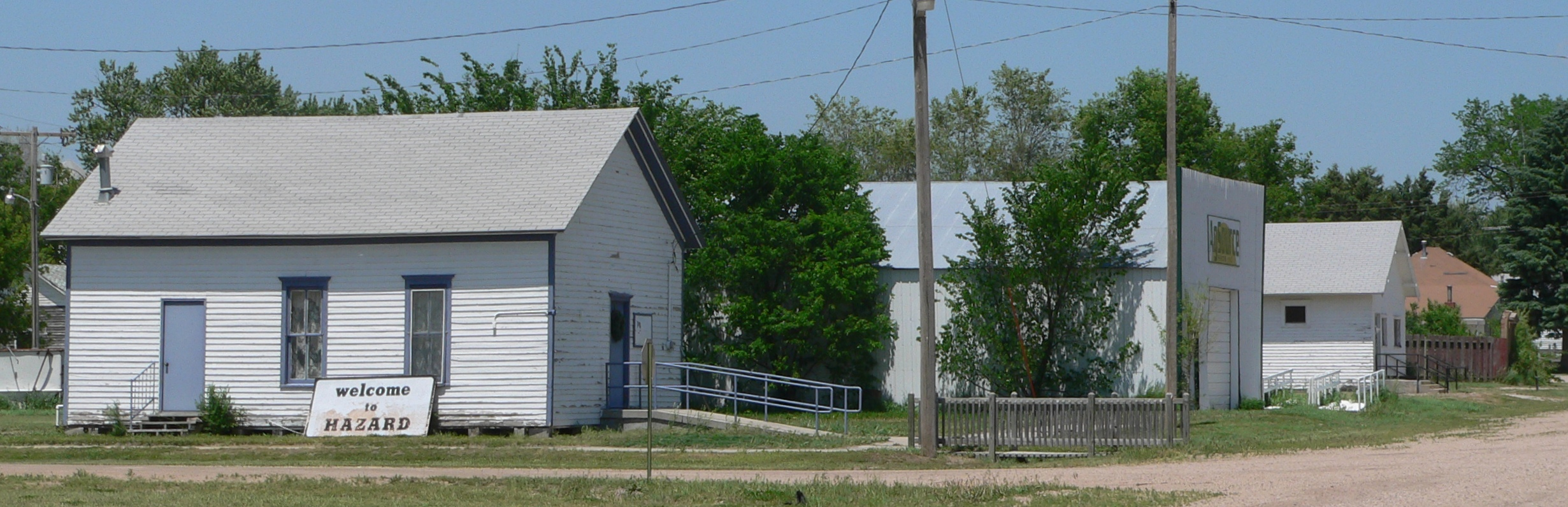
- "Downtown" Hazard: Market Street, May 2010

- Location of Hazard, Nebraska
- Coordinates: 41°05′30″N 99°04′38″W
- Country: United States
- State: Nebraska
- County: Sherman

Area
  - Total: 0.25 sq mi (0.66 km^{2})
  - Land: 0.25 sq mi (0.66 km^{2})
  - Water: 0 sq mi (0.00 km^{2})
- Elevation: 2,123 ft (647 m)

Population (2020)
  - Total: 57
  - Density: 224.1/sq mi (86.53/km^{2})
- Time zone: UTC-6 (Central (CST))
  - Summer (DST): UTC-5 (CDT)
- ZIP code: 68844
- Area code: 308
- FIPS code: 31-21765
- GNIS feature ID: 2398478
- Website: www.hazardnebraska.com

Hazard is a village in Sherman County, Nebraska, United States. The population was 57 as of the 2020 United States census

== History ==
Hazard was established in 1886 when the Grand Island & Wyoming Central Railroad was extended to that point.

== Geography ==
According to the United States Census Bureau, the village has a total area of 0.26 square miles (0.67 km^{2}), all land.

== Demographics ==
Historical population
Census	Pop.	Note	%±
1920	167		—
1930	148		−11.4%
1940	142		−4.1%
1950	130		−8.5%
1960	104		−20.0%
1970	72		−30.8%
1980	75		4.2%
1990	78		4.0%
2000	66		−15.4%
2010	70		6.1%
2020	57		−18.6%
U.S. Decennial Census

=== 2010 census ===
As of the census of 2010, there were 70 people, 34 households, and 17 families residing in the village. The population density was 269.2 inhabitants per square mile (103.9/km^{2}). There were 41 housing units at an average density of 157.7 per square mile (60.9/km^{2}). The racial makeup of the village was 98.6% White and 1.4% from two or more races. Hispanic or Latino of any race were 5.7% of the population.

There were 34 households, of which 26.5% had children under the age of 18 living with them, 38.2% were married couples living together, 2.9% had a female householder with no husband present, 8.8% had a male householder with no wife present, and 50.0% were non-families. 50.0% of all households were made up of individuals, and 17.7% had someone living alone who was 65 years of age or older. The average household size was 2.06 and the average family size was 2.94.

The median age in the village was 39.3 years. 25.7% of residents were under the age of 18; 7.2% were between the ages of 18 and 24; 28.6% were from 25 to 44; 17.1% were from 45 to 64; and 21.4% were 65 years of age or older. The gender makeup of the village was 50.0% male and 50.0% female.

=== 2000 census ===
As of the census of 2000, there were 66 people, 34 households, and 19 families residing in the village. The population density was 260.7 inhabitants per square mile (100.7/km^{2}). There were 39 housing units at an average density of 154.0 per square mile (59.5/km^{2}). The racial makeup of the village was 100.00% White.

There were 34 households, out of which 14.7% had children under the age of 18 living with them, 50.0% were married couples living together, 8.8% had a female householder with no husband present, and 41.2% were non-families. 38.2% of all households were made up of individuals, and 23.5% had someone living alone who was 65 years of age or older. The average household size was 1.94 and the average family size was 2.55.

In the village, the population was spread out, with 18.2% under the age of 18, 4.5% from 18 to 24, 24.2% from 25 to 44, 21.2% from 45 to 64, and 31.8% who were 65 years of age or older. The median age was 46 years. For every 100 females, there were 120.0 males. For every 100 females age 18 and over, there were 107.7 males.

As of 2000 the median income for a household in the village was $23,750, and the median income for a family was $30,000. Males had a median income of $18,750 versus $28,750 for females. The per capita income for the village was $11,629. There were no families and 6.9% of the population living below the poverty line, including no under eighteens and 21.1% of those over 64.

== Popular culture ==
Hazard was the setting of the Richard Marx song "Hazard". Marx arrived at the name because he liked the lyric "this old Nebraska town." He wrote to Nebraska Chamber of Commerce, asking for a list of Nebraska towns with two syllables and found Hazard ideal for its double meaning (The lyrics refer to a river, which the real Hazard does not possess; however, there is a muddy creek).

Although the song did not cast the town in a positive light, the residents invited Marx to be Grand Marshal at Sherman County's Fourth of July parade in 1993, an invite that the singer accepted.

== See also ==
- List of municipalities in Nebraska
