= Love Song (Sky song) =

1999 single by Sky

Single by Sky

from the album Piece of Paradise
- Released: January 11, 1999
- Genre: Pop
- Length: 3:35
- Label: Arista
- Songwriters: Antoine Sicotte; James Renald
- Producers: Euro-Syndicate; Jeff Coplan; Peter Mokran

Sky singles chronology
"Some Kinda Wonderful" (1998)	"Love Song" (1999)	"Push" (1999)

"Love Song" is a song written and performed by Canadian band Sky, released as the third single from their first studio album, Piece of Paradise (1999). It was Sky's most successful single, climbing to number one on the Canadian RPM 100 Hit Tracks chart. It also peaked at number 38 on the US Billboard Mainstream Top 40, becoming the band's only single to appear on any Billboard chart. Sky won a SOCAN Award for this song.

== Music video ==
The song's music video was directed by Jef Renfroe. Interspersed with the band playing the song, the video depicts James Renald wandering through a dimly lit, overcrowded house party.

== Charts ==
=== Weekly charts ===
Chart (1999)	Peak position
Canada Top Singles (RPM)	1
Canada Adult Contemporary (RPM)	1
US Pop Airplay (Billboard)	38

=== Year-end charts ===
Chart (1999)	Position
Canada Top Singles (RPM)	6
Canada Adult Contemporary (RPM)	5
