= Beautiful Goodbye (album) =

Studio album by Richard Marx
- Released: July 8, 2014
- Recorded: Renegade Studio (Chicago); Area 44 (Chicago); Ocean Way (Westlake); Ocean Way (St. Barth)
- Length: 46:46
- Labels: Zanzibar Records; Kobalt Label Services
- Producer: Richard Marx

Richard Marx chronology
Now and Forever: The Ballads (2014)	Beautiful Goodbye (2014)	The Ultimate Collection (2016)

Singles from Richard Marx
- 1. "Just Go" Released: February 14, 2013; 2. "Turn Off The Night" Released: May 20, 2014; 3. "Whatever We Started" Released: May 22, 2014; 4. "Beautiful Goodbye" Released: September 13, 2014

Professional ratings
Review scores
Source	Rating
Allmusic	3/5 stars

Beautiful Goodbye is the 11th studio album by singer-songwriter and record producer Richard Marx. It was released on July 8, 2014. It is his first new studio album since his 2008 albums Emotional Remains and Sundown, although a seasonal album Christmas Spirit was issued in 2012. The album was preceded by the singles "Turn Off The Night" in the UK on May 20 and "Whatever We Started" in the US on May 22. The title track was released as a single on September 13, 2014. "Just Go", a bonus track, had been previously released as a single on February 14, 2013.

According to Nielsen SoundScan, this disc had sold a total of 25,165 American copies as of January, 2018.

== Track listing ==
All tracks are written by Richard Marx, except where noted.

Standard release
No.	Title	Writer(s)	Length
1.	"Whatever We Started"		3:55
2.	"Suddenly"		4:45
3.	"Inside"		5:29
4.	"Beautiful Goodbye"	Marx; Daisy Fuentes	4:55
5.	"Forgot To Remember" (#"" (Marx, , ) – 3:49)	Marx; Matt Scannell; Chris Mann	3:49
6.	"Turn Off the Night"	Marx; David Hodges; Steven Miller	3:28
7.	"Have a Little Faith"		4:43
8.	"Like the World Is Ending"		4:15
9.	"To My Senses"		4:56
10.	"Getaway"	Marx; Walter Afanasieff	3:41
11.	"Eyes on Me"		3:04
Total length:			46:46

Target exclusive bonus tracks
No.	Title	Length
12.	"Just Go"	4:15
13.	"Moscow Calling" (Morgan Page remix)	4:53
Total length:		57:11

== Chart performance ==
Chart (2014)	Peak position
Billboard 200	39

== Album credits ==
- Richard Marx – producer, lead and backing vocals, arrangements, guitars, acoustic guitar, piano, keyboards, programming, bass guitar, string arrangements
- Walter Afanasieff – keyboards, programming, string arrangements
- Michael Jade – keyboards, programming, backing vocals
- Morgan Page – programming
- C. J. Vanston – keyboards, programming, string arrangements
- J. Blynn – guitars
- Bruce Gaitsch – guitars
- Michael Landau – guitars
- Heitor Pereira – guitars
- Matt Scannell – guitars
- Michael Thompson – guitars
- Paul Bushnell – bass guitar
- Herman Matthews – drums
- Lucas Marx – drum programming
- Cliff Colnot – string arrangements
- Jeremy Lubbock – string arrangements
- Steven Miller – string arrangements
- Chris Walden – string arrangements
- Molly DeWolf – backing vocals
- David Hodges – backing vocals, string arrangements
- Chip Matthews – mixing
- Matthew Prock – mixing
