= Flesh and Bone (Richard Marx album) =

Flesh And Bone

Studio album by Richard Marx
- Released: April 1997
- Recorded: 1996–1997
- Genres: R&B; pop rock
- Length: 62:43 (US); 74:08 (International)
- Label: Capitol
- Producers: Richard Marx; Randy Jackson; Fee Waybill

Richard Marx chronology
Channel V at the Hard Rock Live (1995)	Flesh And Bone (1997)	Greatest Hits (1997)

Flesh and Bone is the fifth studio album by singer/songwriter Richard Marx released in 1997 on Capitol Records.

== Singles ==
The single "Until I Find You Again" reached #3 on the Billboard Adult Contemporary chart and peaked at #42 on the Billboard Hot 100 in the spring of 1997.

== Critical reception ==
Professional ratings
Review scores
Source	Rating
Toledo Blade	3/4 stars
Sun Sentinel	(favourable)
Allmusic	3/5 stars
Los Angeles Daily News	3/5 stars

Within a 3/4 stars review, Richard Paton of the Toledo Blade said "Marx is a longtime poprock hit-maker, but this time around he feels the fire of R&B and offers a disc that has a pop gloss but resonates with more soul than we have heard from him." Sandra Schulman of the Sun Sentinel declared "Dependable, smooth pop-rock with poetic lyrics sung in a well-meaning way is, has been and always will be Marx's style. Other nice, ready-for-video tracks on Flesh and Bone are the midtempo dance number Fool's Game and the touchy subject matter of You Never Take Me Dancing." Within a 3/5 stars review, Stephen Thomas Erlewine of Allmusic exclaimed "Flesh & Bone is an improvement from Paid Vacation, mainly because Marx "isn't trying as hard to be contemporary". Erwine said that Marx "accepted, more or less, that he isn't fighting for a position in the Top 40 and has resigned himself to the adult contemporary charts". "While that means Flesh & Blood doesn't even rock as hard as, say, "Don't Mean Nothin'," it does mean that is pleasantly and inoffensively melodic, with more memorable moments than its predecessor", he added.

Fred Shuster of the Los Angeles Daily News in a 3/5 stars review wrote, "You know Richard Marx - the forgotten Marx brother, the shallow, musical one called Nauseo. It was a surprise, then, to discover Marx's new R&B-drenched effort, "Flesh and Bone" (Capitol), is his most likable and modern-sounding to date. From the subtle trip-hop touches of the strong opener, "Fool's Game"; to the funky Earth, Wind & Fire tribute, "You Never Take Me Dancing"; and the modern soul of "Breathless"; Marx as producer and artist hits the bull's-eye."

== Track listing ==
All tracks are written by and produced by Richard Marx, except where noted.

US release
No.	Title	Writer(s)	Producer(s)	Length
1.	"Fool's Game"			6:25
2.	"You Never Take Me Dancing"			5:39
3.	"Touch of Heaven"		Marx; Randy Jackson	4:51
4.	"What's the Story"			5:04
5.	"Can't Lie to My Heart"			6:29
6.	"Until I Find You Again"		Marx; Gorgeous Blonde	4:24
7.	"My Confession"			5:08
8.	"Eternity"		Marx; Fee Waybill	5:23
9.	"What's Wrong with That"	Marx; Waybill		4:40
10.	"The Image"	Marx; Waybill		4:21
11.	"Breathless"			5:48
12.	"Miracle"			4:20
Total length:				62:43

International release
No.	Title	Writer(s)	Producer(s)	Length
1.	"Fool's Game"			6:25
2.	"You Never Take Me Dancing"			5:39
3.	"Touch of Heaven"		Marx; Jackson	4:51
4.	"What's the Story"			5:04
5.	"Can't Lie to My Heart"			6:29
6.	"Until I Find You Again"		Marx; Gorgeous Blonde	4:24
7.	"My Confession"			5:08
8.	"Surrender to Me" (feat. Lara Fabian)	Marx; Ross Vannelli		3:41
9.	"Eternity"		Marx; Waybill	5:23
10.	"What's Wrong with That"	Marx; Waybill		4:40
11.	"The Image"	Marx; Waybill		4:21
12.	"Too Shy to Say"	Stevie Wonder		3:19
13.	"Talk to Ya Later"	David Foster; Steve Lukather; The Tubes		4:22
14.	"Breathless"			5:48
15.	"Miracle"			4:20
Total length:				74:08

Canadian release
No.	Title	Writer(s)	Producer(s)	Length
1.	"Fool's Game"			6:25
2.	"You Never Take Me Dancing"			5:39
3.	"Touch of Heaven"		Marx; Jackson	4:51
4.	"What's the Story"			5:04
5.	"Can't Lie to My Heart"			6:29
6.	"Until I Find You Again"		Marx; Gorgeous Blonde	4:24
7.	"Everyday of Your Life" (feat. Roch Voisine)			4:40
8.	"My Confession"			5:08
9.	"Surrender to Me" (feat. Lara Fabian)	Marx; Vannelli		3:41
10.	"Eternity"		Marx; Waybill	5:23
11.	"What's Wrong with That"	Marx; Waybill		4:40
12.	"The Image"	Marx; Waybill		4:21
13.	"Breathless"			5:48
14.	"Miracle"			4:20
15.	"Chaque jour de la vie" (feat. Roch Voisine) (French version)			4:40
Total length:				65:44

Japanese release
No.	Title	Writer(s)	Producer(s)	Length
1.	"Fool's Game"			6:25
2.	"You Never Take Me Dancing"			5:39
3.	"Touch of Heaven"		Marx; Jackson	4:51
4.	"What's the Story"			5:04
5.	"Can't Lie to My Heart"			6:29
6.	"Until I Find You Again"		Marx; Gorgeous Blonde	4:24
7.	"Everyday of Your Life" (feat. Aska)			4:40
8.	"My Confession"			5:08
9.	"Eternity"		Marx; Waybill	5:23
10.	"What's Wrong with That"	Marx; Waybill		4:40
11.	"The Image"	Marx; Waybill		4:21
12.	"Breathless"			5:48
13.	"Miracle"			4:20
14.	"Too Shy to Say"	Wonder		3:19
15.	"Everyday of Your Life" (Richard solo)			4:40

== Charts ==
=== Albums ===
1997	Swiss	24
1997	US	70

=== Singles ===
Year	Song	Chart positions		
Year	Song	U.S. Hot 100	U.S. AC	UK
1997	"Until I Find You Again"	42	3	44

== Personnel ==
- Richard Marx – lead vocals, backing vocals (1–5, 7–12), keyboards (1, 6, 7, 8, 11), digital piano (1), synth kalimba (2), acoustic guitar (5), acoustic piano (12)
- Greg Phillinganes – keyboards (2), Rhodes (5, 11)
- John Lehmkuhl – synthesizer programming (3)
- Tom Keane – Rhodes (4)
- Simon Franglen – Synclavier programming (6), keyboard programming (6–8), keyboards (7, 8), drum programming (7, 8)
- Jamey Jaz – synthesizer programming (9)
- Matt Rollings – Hammond B3 organ (10)
- David Innis – keyboards (12)
- Bruce Gaitsch – guitar (1, 2, 5, 9–12), acoustic guitar (5), nylon string guitar and solo (6)
- Michael Landau – guitar (3, 4)
- Michael Thompson – guitar (6–8)
- Steve Lukather – guitar (13)
- Randy Jackson – electric bass (1, 4, 5, 9–12), synthesizer programming (3)
- John Pierce – electric bass (13)
- Herman Matthews – drums (2, 12)
- Jonathan Moffett – drums (4, 5, 9–11)
- Simon Phillips – drums (13)
- Chris Trujillo – percussion (5)
- Kim Wilson – harmonica (4)
- Marc Russo – saxophone (11, 12)
  - Horns on "What's Wrong With That" – Lee Thornburg and Steve Grove
  - Horns on "The Image" – Jerry Hey, Gary Grant, Charley Loper and Marc Russo; Arranged by Dick and Richard Marx
  - Strings on "Fool's Game" and "Can't Lie to My Heart" – Israel Baker, Charles Veal Jr., Murray Adler, Bernard Kundell, Gail Tricia Cruz-Farkas, Bette Byers, Henry Ferber, James Getzoff, Ezra Kliger, Farhad Behroozi, Carole Mukogawa, Cynthia Morrow, Milton Thomas, David Shamban, Daniel Smith and Waldemar DeAlmida; Arranged and conducted by Dick Marx
  - Backing vocals – Maurice White (2), Cindy Mizell (2, 4, 10), Paulette McWilliams (2, 4, 10), Luther Vandross (4, 5), Nita Whitaker (6), Bob Bowker (7, 8), Jeff Morrow (8), Tony Ransom (8), Steve Grissette (8), Fee Waybill (9)
  - Co-Lead vocals – Gorgeous Blonde (6), Fee Waybill (8, 13)

== Production ==
- Arranged by Richard Marx (all tracks), Randy Jackson (track 3), Michael Landau (track 4) and Jamey Jaz (track 9).
- All songs produced by Richard Marx, except "Touch of Heaven" produced by Richard Marx and Randy Jackson; Lead Vocal on "Until I Find You Again" produced by Gorgeous Blonde; Lead Vocal on "Eternity" produced by Fee Waybill.
- Recording Engineers – Bill Drescher, David Cole, David Whittman, Bruce Gaitsch, Craig Bauer, Greg Droman, Richard Flack, Jess Sutcliffe, Claude Achille and Allen Abrahamson.
- Assistant Engineers – Larry Schalit, Douglas Bamford, Pat Karamian, Mike Douglas, Alex Reed, Bryan Carrigan, Gil Morales, Leslie Ann Jones, Jennifer Wyler, Andrew Page, Mike Tacci and Scott Steiner.
- All songs mixed by Bill Drescher, except "Touch of Heaven" mixed by David Cole.
- Mastered "with care" by Wally Traugott

=== Recording Studios ===
- The Record Plant, A&M Studios, Conway Studios, Frantic Studios, Johnny Yuma, Music Grinder, Enterprise Studios, L.D.S. in Westlake Studios (all in Los Angeles)
- Sony Studios (NYC)
- Battery Studios (London)
- Quad Studios (Nashville)
- Hinge Studios (Chicago)
