= Days in Avalon =

Studio album by Richard Marx
- Released: October 24, 2000
- Studios: Renegade (Chicago); CRC (Chicago); Hinge (Chicago); Music Grinder (Los Angeles); Capitol (Los Angeles); The Treehouse (Los Angeles); Andorra (Los Angeles); CocoButt (Los Angeles); Woodland (Nashville); Ocean Way (Nashville); Soundstage (Nashville); Sound Kitchen (Franklin)
- Genres: Adult contemporary; pop rock; country
- Length: 53:04
- Label: Signal 21
- Producers: Richard Marx; David Cole

Richard Marx chronology
| The Essential Richard Marx (2000) | Days in Avalon (2000) | Timeline (2000) |

Singles from Days in Avalon
- 1. "Days in Avalon" Released: October 2000; 2. "Straight From My Heart" Released: May 2001

Days in Avalon is the sixth studio album by singer/songwriter Richard Marx, released independently in 2000 on the now defunct label Signal 21. This was the only release on the label created by Marx and Blood, Sweat, and Tears drummer Bobby Colomby.

The title track, "Days In Avalon", was the only song within the album to appear on any charts. The song spent twelve weeks on the Billboard Adult Contemporary chart, peaking at #25. "Straight From My Heart" was later released to country radio but failed to appear on any charts.

It failed to make the main chart but did manage to reach #41 on Billboard's new Independent Albums survey. Per Nielsen SoundScan, this album had sold 32,391 copies at the time of its deletion.

== Track listing ==
All tracks are written by Richard Marx, except where noted.

Standard release
| No. | Title | Writer(s) | Length |
|---|---|---|---|
| 1. | "Days in Avalon" | | 4:54 |
| 2. | "Shine" | | 4:35 |
| 3. | "Someone Special" | | 4:13 |
| 4. | "Almost Everything" | Marx; Bruce Gaitsch | 4:47 |
| 5. | "The Edge of Forever" | Marx; Wright | 4:21 |
| 6. | "Power of You and Me" | | 3:42 |
| 7. | "One More Time" | | 4:26 |
| 8. | "Waiting on Your Love" | Marx; Fee Waybill | 4:27 |
| 9. | "More Than a Mystery" | | 4:19 |
| 10. | "Boy Next Door" | | 4:44 |
| 11. | "Too Early to Be Over" | Marx; Waybill | 3:54 |
| 12. | "Straight From My Heart" | | 4:42 |
| Total length: | | | 53:04 |

Japanese release
| No. | Title | Writer(s) | Length |
|---|---|---|---|
| 1. | "Days in Avalon" | | 4:54 |
| 2. | "Almost Everything" | Marx; Gaitsch | 4:47 |
| 3. | "This I Promise You" | | 4:29 |
| 4. | "Until You Come Back to Me" | | 4:02 |
| 5. | "One More Time" | | 4:26 |
| 6. | "High" | | 3:44 |
| 7. | "More Than a Mystery" | | 4:19 |
| 8. | "I Can't Help It" | | 4:35 |
| 9. | "Someone Special" | | 4:13 |
| 10. | "Shine" | | 4:35 |
| 11. | "Power of You and Me" | | 3:42 |
| 12. | "Boy Next Door" | | 4:44 |
| 13. | "Waiting on Your Love" | Marx; Waybill | 4:27 |
| 14. | "Straight From My Heart" | | 4:42 |
| Total length: | | | 61:40 |

== Singles/chart history ==
| Year | Song | US A.C. |
|---|---|---|
| 2000 | "Days In Avalon" | 25 |

== Personnel ==
- Richard Marx – arrangements, lead vocals, backing vocals (1, 2, 6, 8, 9), acoustic guitar (4, 5), keyboards (5, 7, 12), 12-string guitar (5), synth guitar (7), acoustic piano (10), synth strings (10)
- C.J. Vanston – keyboards (1), programming (1), keyboard programming (2, 8), drum programming (2, 8), arrangements (2, 8)
- Gary Smith – keyboards (3, 6)
- Matt Rollings – Hammond B3 organ (4, 11), arrangements (4)
- Tim Akers – keyboards (9), loops (9)
- Greg Phillinganes – Wurlitzer electric piano (10)
- Michael Landau – acoustic guitar (1), electric guitars (1, 11)
- Michael Thompson – guitars (2, 4, 8, 9), arrangements (4), electric guitars (7), acoustic guitar (11)
- J. T. Corenflos – electric guitars (3, 5, 6, 12)
- Bruce Gaitsch – acoustic guitar (3, 4, 11, 12), arrangements (4), classical guitar (7), guitars (10), guitar solo (11)
- Paul Franklin – slide guitar (3), steel guitar (5), pedal steel guitar (12)
- Don Kirkpatrick – slide guitar (4), slide guitar solo (4), arrangements (4)
- Blue Miller – acoustic guitar (6)
- Randy Jackson – bass (1, 4, 9–11), arrangements (4)
- Michael Rhodes – bass (3, 12)
- George Hawkins – bass (5)
- Duncan Mullins – bass (6)
- Herman Matthews – drums (1, 4, 9–11), arrangements (4)
- Eddie Bayers – drums (3, 5, 6, 12)
- Eric Darken – percussion (6)
- Cliff Colnot – string arrangements and conductor (7)
- Fee Waybill – backing vocals (1)
- Chely Wright – lead vocals (5)
- Shannon Brown – backing vocals (6)
- Joan Collaso – backing vocals (11)
- Yvonne Gage – backing vocals (11)
- Robin E. Robinson – backing vocals (11)
- Anne Bent – special guest singer (11)
- Constance Conway – special guest singer (11)
- Peggy Hopkins – special guest singer (11)
- Julie Lyons – special guest singer (11)
- Alison Krauss – backing vocals (12)

== Production ==
- Producer – Richard Marx
- Vocal co-production on Track 3 – David Cole
- Engineers – David Cole, Craig Bauer, Butch Carr, Bill Drescher, Matt Prock and Luke Wooten.
- Assistant Engineers – Chad Brown, Ok Hee Kim, Alan Mason, Cesar Ramirez, Kelly Schoenfield, Christine Sioris and Darrell Thorp.
- Chely Wright's vocal on Track 5 engineered by Butch Carr.
- Mixed by David Cole at Conway Studios (Hollywood, CA) and The Village Recorder (Los Angeles, CA).
- Mastered by Steve Hall at Future Disc (Hollywood, CA).
- Production Coordination – Shari Sutcliffe
- Art Direction – Willy Lovet
- Design – Masae Hamanoya and Willy Lovet
- Photography – Nels Israelson

== Miscellaneous ==
- The Japanese version of the album contained the following bonus tracks, "This I Promise You", "Until You Come Back To Me", "High" and "I Can't Help It".
- Album was dedicated to Dick Marx.
