= Piece of Paradise =

- 1999 re-release cover

Studio album by Sky
- Released: February 2, 1999 (Canada); June 29, 1999 (US)
- Genre: Pop rock
- Length: 39:37
- Label: Arista/EMI Music Canada
- Producers: Euro-Syndicate and Jeff Coplan for Euro-Syndicate Productions LLC and Peter Mokran (tracks 1, 5, 6, 7); Peter Mokran (tracks 2, 8, 9, 10); Peter Mokran, Antoine & James (tracks 3 and 4)

Sky chronology
Piece of Paradise (1999)	Traveling Infinity (2000)

Professional ratings
Review scores
Source	Rating
Allmusic	3/5 stars

Piece of Paradise is a pop rock album released by the Canadian band Sky on February 2, 1999, in Canada.

Its original Canadian release was slated for October 1998 before EMI Music Canada pushed it into the next year to avoid the Christmas rush.

The album was later released in various other versions in North America and elsewhere.

The U.S. version, released on June 29, 1999, by Arista Records with an alternate blue cover, removes tracks "Powder" and "Last Time I Saw You" from the original version. It also adds two new tracks, "Dreamin'" and "Strange."

A second Canadian version was issued in 1999 which included all 12 tracks from both versions, with "Strange" and "Dreamin'" added as the final two songs. This is the version widely available on streaming platforms.

== Track listing (Original Canadian Release) ==
1. "Push" - 4:31
2. "You and I" 3:43
3. "Shave" - 4:39
4. "Some Kinda Wonderful" - 3:46
5. "I Will Survive" - 4:39
6. "America" - 3:08
7. "Powder" - 4:43
8. "Love Song" - 3:35
9. "All I Want" - 3:30
10. "Last Time I Saw You" - 3:32

== Track listing (1999 U.S. Release - Blue Cover) ==
1. "Love Song" - 3:35
2. "Push" - 4:31
3. "Strange" - 4:28
4. "Dreamin'" - 3:38
5. "America" - 3:08
6. "All I Want" - 3:30
7. "Some Kinda Wonderful" - 3:46
8. "You and I" - 3:43
9. "Shave" - 4:39
10. "I Will Survive" (Dino Fekaris, Freddie Perren) - 4:39

== Track listing (Japanese Version) ==
1. "Love Song" - 3:35
2. "Push" - 4:31
3. "Strange" - 4:28
4. "Dreamin'" - 3:38
5. "America" - 3:08
6. "All I Want" - 3:30
7. "Some Kinda Wonderful" - 3:46
8. "You and I" - 3:43
9. "Shave" - 4:39
10. "Powder" - 4:44
11. "Last Time I Saw You" - 3:40
12. "I Will Survive" 4:39

== Chart performance ==
=== Album ===
Chart (1999)	Peak position
Canadian Albums Chart	6
