= Young at Heart =

Young at Heart may refer to:

== Music ==
- Young at Heart (Johnny Richards and Carolyn Leigh song), a 1953 pop standard first recorded by Frank Sinatra
- "Young at Heart" (Amy Meredith song)
- "Young at Heart" (Bananarama song), also covered by The Bluebells
- Young at Heart (Doris Day and Frank Sinatra album), a soundtrack album from the 1954 film
- Young at Heart (Howard McGhee and Teddy Edwards album), a 1979 jazz album
- Young at Heart (Tony Williams album), a 1996 jazz album
- Young at Heart (James Young album), a 1966 comedy album
- Young at Heart, a 1960 album by Ray Conniff
- "Young at Heart", a 2024 song by MacKenzie Porter from Nobody's Born with a Broken Heart
- Young at Heart/Wise in Time, a 1974 album by Muhal Richard Abrams
- Young@Heart, an American chorus group

== Film ==
- Young at Heart (1955 film), a film starring Frank Sinatra and Doris Day
- Young at Heart (1987 film), a film that received an Academy Award for Documentary Short Subject
- Young at Heart (1995 film), a television movie starring Olympia Dukakis
- Young@Heart (film), a 2008 documentary film about the group Young@Heart

== Television ==
- "Young at Heart" (2point4 children), an episode of 2point4 children
- "Young at Heart" (American Dragon: Jake Long), an episode of American Dragon: Jake Long
- "Young at Heart" (The Honeymooners), an episode of The Honeymooners
- "Young at Heart" (The X-Files), an episode of The X-Files
- Young at Heart (1960 TV series), a UK music television series presented by Jimmy Savile
- Young at Heart (1980 TV series), a UK sitcom starring John Mills
