= Chains Around My Heart =

1990 song by John Farnham

"Chains Around the Heart"

Song by John Farnham
- A-side: "Burn for You"
- Released: 12 November 1990
- Length: 6:36
- Label: RCA, Wheatley
- Songwriters: Richard Marx, Fee Waybill
- Producer: Ross Fraser

"Chains Around My Heart"

Single by Richard Marx

from the album Rush Street
- B-side: "Don't Mean Nothing"
- Released: 1992
- Length: 5:45
- Label: Capitol
- Songwriters: Richard Marx, Fee Waybill
- Producer: Richard Marx

Richard Marx singles chronology
"Take This Heart" (1992)	"Chains Around My Heart" (1992)	"Can't Help Falling in Love" (1992)

"Chains Around My Heart" is a song co-written by American musicians Richard Marx and Fee Waybill, originally recorded by Australian singer John Farnham under the title "Chains Around the Heart" as the B-side to his 1990 single "Burn for You". Marx then recorded his own version of the song for his third studio album Rush Street (1991), and released it as the album's fourth and final single in 1992 by Capitol Records. Marx's version reached number 44 on the US Billboard Hot 100 chart, number 17 in Canada, and number 29 in the United Kingdom.

== Personnel ==
- Richard Marx – vocals, acoustic piano, Fender Rhodes, keyboards
- Michael Egizi – keyboards
- Bruce Gaitsch – acoustic guitar
- Michael Landau – acoustic guitar, electric guitar, guitar solo
- Jim Cliff – bass
- Jeff Porcaro – drums
- Chris Trujillo – percussion

== Charts ==
=== Weekly charts ===
Chart (1992–1993)	Peak position
Australia (ARIA)	59
Canada Top Singles (RPM)	17
Canada Adult Contemporary (RPM)	9
UK Singles (Official Charts)	29
UK Airplay (Music Week)	27
US Billboard Hot 100	44
US Adult Contemporary (Billboard)	9
US Pop Airplay (Billboard)	27

=== Year-end charts ===
Chart (1992)	Position
Canada Top Singles (RPM)	100

Chart (1993)	Position
Canada Top Singles (RPM)	64
US Adult Contemporary (Billboard)	48

== Release history ==
Region	Date	Format(s)	Label(s)	Ref.
United States	1992	Cassette	Capitol	
Australia	October 26, 1992	CD; cassette	Capitol	
Japan	October 28, 1992	Mini-CD	Capitol	
Australia	November 16, 1992	CD digipak	Capitol	
United Kingdom	November 16, 1992	7-inch single; CD1; cassette	Capitol	
United Kingdom	November 23, 1992	CD2	Capitol	
