= Take This Heart =

1992 single by Richard Marx

- US cassette single artwork

Single by Richard Marx

from the album Rush Street
- B-side: "I Get No Sleep"
- Released: 1992
- Length: 4:10
- Label: Capitol
- Songwriter: Richard Marx
- Producer: Richard Marx

Richard Marx singles chronology
"Hazard" (1992)	"Take This Heart" (1992)	"Chains Around My Heart" (1992)

Music video
- "Take This Heart" on YouTube

"Take This Heart" is a song by American singer Richard Marx, released as the third single from his third studio album, Rush Street (1991). It peaked at number 20 on the US Billboard Hot 100 while reaching number four on the Billboard Adult Contemporary chart. The song additionally reached the top 20 in Australia and the United Kingdom and peaked at number four in Canada.

== Music video ==
In the video, Richard Marx is seen playing for the Chicago Cubs against the Oakland A's, in the seventh game of the World Series (Marx was born in Chicago and is a noted Cubs fan). In the classic baseball clutch situation, ninth inning with two outs, he is called in to pinch-hit against A's star relief pitcher Dennis Eckersley (a close friend of Marx and former Cubs pitcher). The baseball scenes, with commentary by announcer Bob Uecker, are intercut with footage of Marx and his band playing the song on the field of the A's ballpark, the Oakland Coliseum.

With two strikes against him, Marx hits a home run to win the game for Chicago, to the dismay of Oakland players Rickey Henderson and Jose Canseco. The scene then cuts to a dozing Marx being shaken awake backstage just before a concert, having dreamed the championship game. As he prepares to start the show, Uecker's cry of "The Cubs have won the World Series!" echoes in his head.

Since the game was played in Oakland, the A's (as the home team) would still bat in the bottom of the ninth, so Marx' homer could not have guaranteed a win for the Cubs. In addition, both teams are wearing their home uniforms. Eckersley, Henderson, Canseco, and Uecker appear as themselves, as does Cubs manager Jim Lefebvre and A's manager Tony LaRussa.

== Track listings ==
US and Australian cassette single

1. "Take This Heart" – 4:10
2. "I Get No Sleep" – 3:44

European CD single

1. "Take This Heart" – 4:10
2. "I Get No Sleep" – 3:44
3. "Right Here Waiting" (live) – 4:56

UK 7-inch single

A. "Take This Heart"
B. "Hazard"

UK CD1

1. "Take This Heart"
2. "Take It to the Limit" (live)
3. "That Was Lulu" (live)
4. "Rhythm of Life" (live)

UK CD2

1. "Take This Heart"
2. "Hazard"
3. "Love Unemotional"
4. "Ride with the Idol"

== Personnel ==
- Richard Marx – vocals
- Michael Egizi – keyboards
- Michael Landau – guitars, guitar solo
- Nathan East – bass
- Jonathan Moffett – drums
- Chris Trujillo – percussion

== Charts ==
=== Weekly charts ===
Chart (1992)	Peak position
Australia (ARIA)	11
Canada Top Singles (RPM)	4
Canada Adult Contemporary (RPM)	4
Europe (Eurochart Hot 100)	34
Ireland (IRMA)	21
New Zealand (Recorded Music NZ)	48
UK Singles (Official Charts)	13
UK Airplay (Music Week)	1
US Billboard Hot 100	20
US Adult Contemporary (Billboard)	4
US Pop Airplay (Billboard)	23

=== Year-end charts ===
Chart (1992)	Position
Australia (ARIA)	81
Canada Top Singles (RPM)	36
Canada Adult Contemporary (RPM)	20
UK Airplay (Music Week)	71
US Billboard Hot 100	81
US Adult Contemporary (Billboard)	15

== Release history ==
Region	Date	Format(s)	Label(s)	Ref.
United States	1992	Cassette	Capitol	
Japan	June 17, 1992	Mini-CD	Capitol	
United Kingdom	August 17, 1992	7-inch vinyl; CD; cassette	Capitol	
