= Now and Forever (Richard Marx song) =

1994 single by Richard Marx

Single by Richard Marx

from the album Paid Vacation
- B-side: "Hazard (live)"
- Released: January 12, 1994
- Genre: Soft rock
- Length: 3:31
- Label: Capitol
- Songwriter: Richard Marx
- Producer: Richard Marx

Richard Marx singles chronology
"Chains Around My Heart" (1992)	"Now and Forever" (1994)	"Silent Scream" (1994)

Music video
- "Now and Forever" on YouTube

"Now and Forever" is a song written, produced, and performed by American singer-songwriter Richard Marx. Released in January 1994, by Capitol Records, as the first single from his fourth album, Paid Vacation (1994), the song became a top-10 hit in the United States, Canada, and Norway. It was also used in the 1994 film The Getaway, starring Kim Basinger and Alec Baldwin, and directed by Roger Donaldson. Marx also recorded a Spanish-language version titled "Ahora y Siempre" for the Spanish market.

== Background ==
Richard Marx wrote "Now and Forever" about his wife, actress Cynthia Rhodes. He has been quoted as saying: "I was working on the fourth album and realized I had not written a song addressing our relationship since we had gotten married and had three kids. I think this is one of those songs which was unique in that the verses are so specific to our relationship."

== Critical reception ==
Larry Flick from Billboard magazine wrote, "First single from Marx's new Paid Vacation album is a sugary but incredibly romantic acoustic-pop ballad. Warmed by the unmistakable guitarwork of Lee Ritenour, tune is likely to meet with ardent top 40 approval— especially given the active play it has begun to receive at AC level. Marx is in excellent voice here, bringing a matured depth to the song's lyric. Also, listen for track in the new Alec Baldwin/Kim Basinger film, The Getaway." Alan Jones from Music Week gave the song a score of three out of five, noting that it was the first single from Marx for nearly 18 months. He described it as "a stylish ballad, though its dour and subdued nature, plus the lengthy gap Marx has had between releases, are likely to count against it." Pan-European magazine Music & Media commented, "It's the "Unplugged" era, and the FM rocker returns accordingly with the acoustic single 'Now and Forever'—a ballad with Spanish guitar and strings."

== Chart performance ==
The song was Marx's ninth and final song to enter the top 10 of the US Billboard Hot 100 chart, where it peaked at number seven. The song remained in the top 40 for 23 weeks. It was more successful in Cash Box magazine, spending two weeks inside the top three. It was also Marx's biggest hit on the Billboard Adult Contemporary chart, where it reached number one and remained at the top for 11 weeks. In Canada, "Now and Forever" was the most successful adult contemporary song of 1994, topping the RPM Adult Contemporary Tracks chart for seven weeks. Elsewhere, the single reached the top 10 in Canada and Norway and the top 20 in Sweden, Australia, and the United Kingdom. It missed the latter milestone in New Zealand, peaking at number 21.

== Charts ==
=== Weekly charts ===
Chart (1994)	Peak position
Australia (ARIA)	16
Canada Top Singles (RPM)	6
Canada Adult Contemporary (RPM)	1
Europe (Eurochart Hot 100)	19
Europe (European Hit Radio)	3
Germany (GfK)	54
Iceland (Íslenski Listinn Topp 40)	11
Ireland (IRMA)	18
Israel (Israeli Singles Chart)	25
Netherlands (Dutch Top 40 Tipparade)	10
Netherlands (Single Top 100 Tipparade)	11
New Zealand (Recorded Music NZ)	21
Norway (VG-lista)	8
Panama (UPI)	4
Scottish Singles Sales (Official Charts)	67
Sweden (Sverigetopplistan)	11
UK Singles (Official Charts)	13
UK Airplay (Music Week)	8
US Billboard Hot 100	7
US Adult Contemporary (Billboard)	1
US Pop Airplay (Billboard)	9
US Cash Box Top 100	3

=== Year-end charts ===
Chart (1994)	Position
Brazil (Mais Tocadas)	24
Canada Top Singles (RPM)	44
Canada Adult Contemporary (RPM)	1
Europe (European Hit Radio)	29
Sweden (Topplistan)	54
UK Singles (OCC)	152
US Billboard Hot 100	25
US Adult Contemporary (Billboard)	2
US Cash Box Top 100	36

== Release history ==
Region	Date	Format(s)	Label(s)	Ref.
Japan	January 12, 1994	Mini-CD	Capitol	
Australia	January 17, 1994	CD; cassette	Capitol	
United Kingdom	January 17, 1994	7-inch vinyl; CD; cassette	Capitol	
