= Rush Street (album) =

Studio album by Richard Marx
- Released: October 28, 1991
- Recorded: November 1990−June 1991
- Studios: A&M, Lion's Share, Right Track, Sunset Sound, Frantic Studio, Westlake, Capitol, Bill Champlin Studio, Village Recorder, Elumba Studios, Can-Am Studios, The Enterprise
- Genres: Pop rock; adult contemporary
- Length: 65:35
- Label: Capitol
- Producers: Richard Marx; Fee Waybill

Richard Marx chronology
Repeat Offender (1989)	Rush Street (1991)	Paid Vacation (1994)

Singles from Richard Marx
- 1. "Keep Coming Back" Released: October 1991; 2. "Hazard" Released: January 1992; 3. "Take This Heart" Released: June 1992; 4. "Chains Around My Heart" Released: October 1992

Professional ratings
Review scores
Source	Rating
AllMusic	3/5 stars
Calgary Herald	C
Chicago Tribune	2.5/4 stars
Entertainment Weekly	D

Rush Street is the third studio album by singer and songwriter Richard Marx. Released in October 1991, it sold over two million copies in the United States alone. It was Marx's third consecutive multi-million seller in the U.S.

Its first single, "Keep Coming Back," was #1 on the American Adult Contemporary chart for four consecutive weeks. It reached #5 in Cashbox while peaking at #12 in Billboard. The follow-up single, "Hazard", also hit #1 Adult Contemporary. It reached #6 in Cashbox and #9 on the Billboard Hot 100.

Subsequent single releases included "Take This Heart" and "Chains Around My Heart", which were Top Ten hits on the US Adult Contemporary charts. All four hits boasted popular music videos as well. Toto members Steve Lukather and Jeff Porcaro were among the session musicians employed on the album, although they play on separate tracks.

Marx admitted in 2001 that the track "Superstar" is about Madonna. The album was dedicated to son Brandon Marx and grandmother Lois.

== Track listing ==
All tracks are written by Richard Marx, except where noted.

No.	Title	Writer(s)	Length
1.	"Playing with Fire"	Marx; Steve Lukather	4:29
2.	"Love Unemotional"		5:06
3.	"Keep Coming Back"		6:51
4.	"Take This Heart"		4:10
5.	"Hazard"		5:17
6.	"Hands in Your Pocket"		3:54
7.	"Calling You"	Marx; Bruce Gaitsch	4:42
8.	"Superstar"		4:42
9.	"Streets of Pain"	Marx; Fee Waybill	5:10
10.	"I Get No Sleep"		3:44
11.	"Big Boy Now"	Marx; Waybill	5:38
12.	"Chains Around My Heart"	Marx; Waybill	5:42
13.	"Your World"		5:54
Total length:			65:35

Japanese release
No.	Title	Writer(s)	Length
9.	"Ride with Idol"	Marx; Gaitsch; Waybill	3:46
10.	"Streets of Pain"	Marx; Waybill	5:10
11.	"I Get No Sleep"		3:44
12.	"Big Boy Now"	Marx; Waybill	5:38
13.	"Chains Around My Heart"	Marx; Waybill	5:42
14.	"Your World"		5:54
Total length:			69:17

Australian Tour Edition bonus tracks
No.	Title	Writer(s)	Length
14.	"Don't Mean Nothing" (live)	Marx; Gaitsch	4:14
15.	"Hold On to the Nights" (live)		4:50
16.	"Have Mercy" (live)		4:21
Total length:			78:58

Latin American release bonus track
No.	Title	Length
14.	"Regresa a mi" (Keep Coming Back) (Spanish version)	6:46

== Personnel ==
Musicians

- Richard Marx – arrangements, lead vocals, acoustic piano (11, 12), Fender Rhodes (12), keyboards (12)
- Michael Egizi – keyboards (3–6, 8, 11, 12, 13), programming (5)
- Greg Phillinganes – Fender Rhodes (3)
- Kim Bullard – keyboards (7)
- Bill Champlin – Hammond B3 organ (8)
- Billy Joel – acoustic piano (10)
- Steve Lukather – guitars (1, 9, 10), guitar solos (1, 9), arrangements (1, 9, 10)
- Bruce Gaitsch – guitars (2, 3, 8, 13), acoustic guitar (5, 12), guitar solo (7), arrangements (7, 13)
- Michael Landau – guitars (4, 6, 13), guitar solo (4, 6, 8, 11, 12), acoustic guitar (12), electric guitar (12), arrangements (13)
- Paul Warren – guitars (11)
- Randy Jackson – bass guitar (1, 9, 10)
- Marcus Miller – bass guitar (2)
- Nathan East – bass guitar (3, 4, 6, 13)
- Jim Cliff – bass guitar (7, 11, 12)
- Leland Sklar – bass guitar (8)
- Jon Clarke – drum programming (1)
- Terry Bozzio – drums (1, 10, 13)
- Jonathan Moffett – drums (2, 3, 4)
- Jeff Porcaro – drums (6, 7, 8, 12), arrangements (8)
- Tommy Lee – drums (9)
- Mike Baird – drums (11)
- Chris Trujillo – percussion (4, 5, 12, 13)
- John "Juke" Logan – harmonica (2)
- Jerry Hey – horn arrangements (2)
- Steve Grove – saxophone (2, 3)
- Lee Thornburg – trombone (2), trumpet (2)

Background vocals

- Tamara Champlin (1, 2, 9)
- Jim Cliff (1)
- Dalbello (1, 2, 9)
- Michael Egizi (1)
- Steve George (1)
- Richard Marx (1, 2, 5–9, 13)
- Richard Page (1)
- Brandy Rosenberg (1)
- Matt Westfield (1)
- John "Juke" Logan (2)
- Luther Vandross (2, 3)
- Janet Gardner (6)
- Ruth Marx (9)
- Fee Waybill (9)
- Cheryl Lynn (10)
- Cindy Mizelle (10)

Production

- Brad Aldredge – assistant engineer
- Bryant Arnett – assistant engineer
- Ray Blair – engineer (6)
- Rick Caughron – assistant engineer
- Lavant Coppock – assistant engineer
- Peter Doell – engineer (5, 7, 12)
- Michael Douglas – assistant engineer
- Bill Drescher – engineer (1–4, 6, 8, 10, 11), mixing (1–7, 10, 12), additional engineer (5)
- Susanne Edgren – production coordination
- Ross Garfield – technician
- Lolly Grodner – assistant engineer
- Mick Guzauski – mixing (8)
- Mark Hagen – assistant engineer
- Nels Israelson – photography
- Brian Jackson – design
- Leslie Ann Jones – assistant engineer
- Jesse Kanner – assistant engineer
- Brian Malouf – mixing (11, 13)
- Pat McDougal – assistant engineer
- Tom Nellen – assistant engineer
- Rick Norman – assistant engineer
- Charles Paakkari – assistant engineer
- Kevin Reeves – assistant engineer
- Mark Stebbeds – assistant engineer
- Wally Traugott – mastering
- Larry Vigon – art direction, design
- Fee Waybill – co-producer (lead vocals; 1, 10)
- Randy Wine – assistant engineer
- Dave Wittman – engineer (Billy Joel; 10)

== Charts ==
=== Weekly charts ===
Chart (1991/92)	Peak position
Australian Albums (ARIA)	11
Canada Top Albums/CDs (RPM)	14
Dutch Albums (Album Top 100)	69
German Albums (Offizielle Top 100)	33
New Zealand Albums (RMNZ)	31
Norwegian Albums (VG-lista)	12
Swedish Albums (Sverigetopplistan)	27
Swiss Albums (Schweizer Hitparade)	17
UK Albums (Official Charts)	7
US Billboard 200	35

=== Year-end charts ===
Chart (1992)	Position
Australia (ARIA Charts)	52
Canada Top Albums/CDs (RPM)	79
US Billboard 200	57

== Certifications ==
Region	Certification	Certified units/sales
Australia (ARIA)	Platinum	70,000^{^}
United States (RIAA)	Platinum	1,000,000^{^}
^{^} Shipments figures based on certification alone.
