= Hazard (song) =

1992 single by Richard Marx

Single by Richard Marx

from the album Rush Street
- B-side: "Big Boy Now"; "Thunder and Lightning"; "Ride with the Idol"
- Released: January 28, 1992
- Genre: Soft rock; pop rock
- Length: 5:17 (album version); 4:48 (edit)
- Label: Capitol
- Songwriter: Richard Marx
- Producer: Richard Marx

Richard Marx singles chronology
"Keep Coming Back" (1991)	"Hazard" (1992)	"Take This Heart" (1992)

"Hazard" is a song written, produced, and performed by American singer-songwriter Richard Marx. The song is about a woman named Mary who mysteriously disappears and a social pariah who is accused of orchestrating Mary's disappearance, despite claiming to be innocent. The song's music video follows this plot. "Hazard" was released as the second single from Marx's third studio album, Rush Street (1991), on January 28, 1992, in the United States.

In April 1992, "Hazard" peaked at No. 9 on the US Billboard Hot 100 and shortly thereafter topped the Billboard Adult Contemporary chart, becoming Marx's third No. 1 single on that chart. Internationally, "Hazard" reached No. 1 in Australia; the top three in Canada, Ireland, and the United Kingdom; and the top 10 in New Zealand, Norway, and Sweden.

== Song overview ==
"Hazard" tells the story of a relationship of some kind between the narrator and a woman named Mary. Mary disappears under suspicious circumstances, and the narrator, already shunned by many in the small village where he has lived since the age of seven ("That boy's not right"), is immediately considered the main suspect. However, the narrator maintains his innocence throughout the song, and the matter of culpability is left open to the listener's interpretation.

Liking the lyric "this old Nebraska town", Richard Marx wrote to the Nebraska Chamber of Commerce, asking for a list of Nebraska towns with two syllables, finding Hazard ideal for its double meaning (the lyrics refer to a river; the real Hazard does not possess one, although there is a muddy creek). Locals invited Marx to be grand marshal at Sherman County's Fourth of July parade in 1993, which he accepted.

Marx considered it a "stupid song that no one would pay attention to" and only recorded it to prove his then-wife Cynthia Rhodes wrong; she had told him it was going to be a huge hit song.

== Music video ==
=== Overview ===
The music video for "Hazard", directed by Michael Haussman, reveals additional video cues and other details that led viewers to speculate about the question of the protagonist's innocence while still following the song's lyrics and ultimately leaving the outcome open to interpretation. The narrator also refers to the state of Nebraska, United States, and specifically a village in that state called Hazard. "Mary" is played by actress Renee Parent. The Sheriff is played by actor Robert Conrad.

=== Video synopsis ===
The music video opens with the protagonist cutting his hair by the side of a river. Suddenly the ghost of Mary is seen hovering over the river. The ghost of Mary is then switched for the ghost of the protagonist's mother. Mary is depicted as having features very similar to those of the mother. Several grown men are seen teasing the protagonist as a child. The town's sheriff is shown stalking Mary, and taking photographs of her from a distance.

The protagonist goes to see Mary but catches her making love to an unidentified person as the police car arrives. He remembers a time in his childhood when he saw his mother committing adultery. In present time, the protagonist flees the scene, leaving his white scarf behind.

Mary is at the river, with a look of surprise on her face, then she appears to be lying in water. The next morning several people assist in arresting the male character in connection with her disappearance.

While in the interrogation room, the protagonist is shown a white scarf, which the sheriff identifies as the item used to strangle Mary. He then denies that he and Mary were romantically involved. He remembers himself as a child seeing his father leave his mother for another woman. He remembers running out of a burning house.

Locals are shown vandalizing the male character's home, breaking its windows and setting a fire. He cannot be proved guilty so a sheriff's deputy drops him off at his ruined home. A woman walking by covers her young son's eyes. The protagonist leaves town by hitchhiking. He remembers Mary saying to him: "You know, everyone thinks I should be afraid of you. But I'm not."

== Track listings ==
US, Canadian, and Australasian cassette single

1. "Hazard"
2. "Big Boy Now"

US and European CD single

1. "Hazard" – 5:17
2. "Thunder and Lightning" – 4:48
3. "Ride with the Idol" – 3:42

Australasian CD single

1. "Hazard" (album version) – 5:17
2. "Should've Known Better" (live) – 5:18
3. "Endless Summer Nights" (live) – 5:28
4. "Right Here Waiting" (live) – 4:52

UK 7-inch and cassette single

1. "Hazard" (edit) – 4:45
2. "Right Here Waiting" (LP version) – 4:23

UK CD1

1. "Hazard" (LP version)
2. "Right Here Waiting" (LP version)
3. "Too Late to Say Goodbye"
4. "Edge of a Broken Heart"

UK CD2

1. "Hazard" (edit)
2. "Keep Coming Back" (quiet storm mix)
3. "Thunder and Lightning"
4. "Endless Summer Nights" (LP version)

== Personnel ==
- Richard Marx – lead and backing vocals
- Michael Egizi – keyboards, programming
- Bruce Gaitsch – acoustic guitar
- Chris Trujillo – percussion

== Charts ==
=== Weekly charts ===
Chart (1992)	Peak position
Australia (ARIA)	1
Canada Top Singles (RPM)	3
Canada Adult Contemporary (RPM)	1
Estonia (Eesti Top 20)	11
Europe (Eurochart Hot 100)	11
Germany (GfK)	42
Ireland (IRMA)	2
Netherlands (Single Top 100)	60
New Zealand (Recorded Music NZ)	7
Norway (VG-lista)	7
Sweden (Sverigetopplistan)	6
Switzerland (Schweizer Hitparade)	26
UK Singles (Official Charts)	3
UK Airplay (Music Week)	2
US Billboard Hot 100	9
US Adult Contemporary (Billboard)	1

=== Year-end charts ===
Chart (1992)	Position
Australia (ARIA)	10
Canada Top Singles (RPM)	11
Canada Adult Contemporary (RPM)	16
Europe (Eurochart Hot 100)	72
New Zealand (RIANZ)	25
Sweden (Topplistan)	45
UK Singles (OCC)	14
UK Airplay (Music Week)	4
US Billboard Hot 100	56
US Adult Contemporary (Billboard)	9

== Certifications ==
Region	Certification	Certified units/sales
Australia (ARIA)	Platinum	70,000^{^}
New Zealand (RMNZ)	Gold	15,000^{‡}
United Kingdom (BPI)	Silver	200,000^{^}
^{^} Shipments figures based on certification alone.^{‡} Sales+streaming figures based on certification alone.

== Release history ==
Region	Date	Format(s)	Label(s)	Ref.
United States	January 28, 1992	CD	Capitol	
Australia	February 17, 1992	CD; cassette	Capitol	
Japan	March 11, 1992	Mini-CD	Capitol	
United Kingdom	March 30, 1992	7-inch vinyl; CD1; cassette	Capitol	
United Kingdom	April 13, 1992	CD2	Capitol	
Australia	May 11, 1992	CD digipak	Capitol	
