= Paid Vacation (album) =

Studio album by Richard Marx
- Released: February 8, 1994
- Recorded: July 1992 – December 1993
- Genres: Rock; pop rock
- Length: 49:38 (US); 60:08 (International)
- Label: Capitol
- Producers: Richard Marx; Terry Thomas; Fee Waybill

Richard Marx chronology
Greatest Hits (1993)	Paid Vacation (1994)	Ballads (1994)

Singles from Paid Vacation
- 1. "Now and Forever" Released: January 12, 1994; 2. "Silent Scream" Released: April 18, 1994; 3. "The Way She Loves Me" Released: 1994; 4. "Nothing Left Behind Us" Released: 1995

Professional ratings
Review scores
Source	Rating
AllMusic	3/5 stars
Chicago Tribune	3/4 stars
Entertainment Weekly	(B)
Los Angeles Times	2/4 stars
Music Week	3/5 stars
People	(mixed)

Paid Vacation is the fourth studio album by American singer/songwriter Richard Marx, released in 1994.

The album features "Now and Forever", Marx's ninth and final Top 10 hit on the U.S. Billboard Hot 100 and most successful single on the Adult Contemporary chart. It was issued as a lead single for the album and stayed atop the Billboard A/C chart for 11 consecutive weeks. The follow-up single "The Way She Loves Me" also achieved in Billboard, reaching the Top 20 on the Hot 100 and hitting #3 at Adult Contemporary radio.

However, the album itself was less successful than his previous efforts. During a 23-week-long chart run on the U. S. Billboard 200, Paid Vacation only reached #37 and failed to climb higher than its predecessor Rush Street (#35). Nevertheless, received his fourth successive Platinum certification from the Recording Industry Association of America in late 1994. The album sold well globally, especially in Japan, providing Marx with his first Gold record in that country. It was also a success in Southeast Asia, where it sold over 1.1 million copies by 1995, alongside Ballads.

The album was dedicated to Marx's then-wife Cynthia Rhodes and sons Brandon, Lucas, and Jesse Marx.

== Track listing ==
All tracks are written by and produced by Richard Marx, except where noted.

US release
No.	Title	Writer(s)	Producer(s)	Length
1.	"The Way She Loves Me"			4:15
2.	"One More Try"	Marx; Bruce Gaitsch		4:25
3.	"Silent Scream"			3:52
4.	"Nothing to Hide"	Marx; Terry Thomas	Marx; Thomas	5:33
5.	"Soul Motion"	Marx; Gaitsch		5:22
6.	"Now and Forever"			3:32
7.	"Goodbye Hollywood"			4:56
8.	"Heaven's Waiting"			3:48
9.	"Nothing Left Behind Us"	Marx; Fee Waybill	Marx; Waybill	5:22
10.	"What You Want"			3:49
11.	"One Man"			5:12
12.	"Baby Blues"	Marx; Gaitsch		0:53
Total length:				49:38

International release
No.	Title	Writer(s)	Producer(s)	Length
1.	"The Way She Loves Me"			4:15
2.	"One More Try"	Marx; Gaitsch		4:25
3.	"Silent Scream"			3:52
4.	"Nothing to Hide"	Marx; Thomas	Marx; Thomas	5:33
5.	"Whole World to Save"	Marx; Waybill		5:31
6.	"Soul Motion"	Marx; Gaitsch		5:22
7.	"Now and Forever"			3:32
8.	"Goodbye Hollywood"			4:56
9.	"Heaven's Waiting"			3:48
10.	"Nothing Left Behind Us"	Marx; Waybill	Marx; Waybill	5:22
11.	"What You Want"			3:49
12.	"One Man"			5:12
13.	"Miami 2017"	Billy Joel		4:32
14.	"Baby Blues"	Marx; Gaitsch		0:53
Total length:				60:08

Japanese release bonus track
No.	Title	Length
15.	"Another Heaven"	4:31
Total length:		64:40

== Personnel ==
- Richard Marx – lead vocals, backing vocals (1, 3–6, 8–11), arrangements (1–5, 8, 10–12), horn arrangements (1), keyboards (2, 8), acoustic guitars (4), "Ooh" vocals (5), additional keyboards (6), finger snaps (9), acoustic piano (10, 13)
- Bill Champlin – organ (1, 11, 12), backing vocals (5, 11), BGV arrangement (11)
- Bill Payne – keyboards (3), organ (10), acoustic piano solo (10)
- David Innis – organ (4)
- Greg Phillinganes – Fender Rhodes (5), keyboards (6)
- Michael Egizi – keyboards (13)
- Bruce Gaitsch – arrangements (1, 2), guitars (1–3, 6, 8–12), acoustic guitar (7), mandolin (7)
- Terry Thomas – guitars (4), backing vocals (4), arrangements (4)
- Paul Warren – guitars (5, 13), guitar solo (12)
- Leland Sklar – arrangements (1), bass (1, 8, 12)
- Randy Jackson – bass (2, 3, 5, 6, 9–11, 13), finger snaps (9)
- Nathan East – bass (7)
- Jonathan Moffett – drums (1, 2, 6, 8–11), finger snaps (9)
- Russ Kunkel – drums (3)
- Tony Beard – drums (4)
- Jeff Porcaro – drums (12)
- Myron Grombacher – drums (13)
- Luis Conte – percussion (3)
- Chris Trujillo – percussion (3, 5)
- Ross Garfield – finger snaps (9)
- Steve Grove – saxophone (1, 5)
- Lee Thornburg – trombone (1), trumpet (1)
- John "Juke" Logan – harmonica (11)
- Lionel Richie – backing vocals (1)
- Luther Vandross – backing vocals (1)
- Cheryl Lynn – backing vocals (4)
- Marilyn Martin – backing vocals (4, 8)
- Max Carl – backing vocals (5, 11)
- Ruth Marx – "Ooh" vocals (5)
- Timothy B. Schmit – backing vocals (8)
- Vince Gill – backing vocals (10)

Strings on "Now and Forever"

- Dick Marx – string arrangements
- Israel Baker, Farhad Behroozi, Charlie Bisharat, Henry Corbett, Gailt Curz, Pavel Farkas, James Getzoff, Jerry Goodman and Sid Page – string players

== Production ==
- Producers – Richard Marx (Tracks 1–3, 5–13); Terry Thomas (Track 4).
- Lead vocals on Tracks 3, 5 & 10 co-produced by Fee Waybill.
- Engineers – Bill Drescher (Tracks 1–3, 5–12); Bruce Gaitsch (Tracks 3 & 4); Richard Marx (Track 4); Rob Jacobs (Track 4); Terry Thomas (Track 4); Peter Doell (Track 13).
- Mixing – Bill Drescher (Tracks 1, 3, 5–13); Mike Shipley (Track 2); Rafe McKenna (Track 4).
- Mastered by Wally Traugott
- Production Coordination – Susanne Marie Edgren
- Art Direction – Larry Vigon
- Design – Brian Johnson and Larry Vigon
- Photography – Nels Israelson
- Inner Photos – Al Silfen
- Management – Left Bank Management

== Charts ==
=== Weekly charts ===
Chart (1994)	Peak position
Australian Albums (ARIA)	2
Austrian Albums (Ö3 Austria)	34
Canadian Albums (RPM)	32
Dutch Albums (Album Top 100)	70
German Albums (Offizielle Top 100)	18
Japanese Albums (Oricon)	15
Norwegian Albums (VG-lista)	9
Scottish Albums (Official Charts)	38
Swedish Albums (Sverigetopplistan)	6
Swiss Albums (Schweizer Hitparade)	7
UK Albums (Official Charts)	11
US Billboard 200	37

=== Year-end charts ===
Chart (1994)	Position
German Albums (Offizielle Top 100)	76
Japanese Albums (Oricon)	127
Swiss Albums (Schweizer Hitparade)	46

== Certifications ==
Region	Certification	Certified units/sales
Canada (Music Canada)	Gold	50,000^{^}
Japan (RIAJ)	Gold	130,000
United States (RIAA)	Platinum	1,000,000^{^}
^{^} Shipments figures based on certification alone.
